= List of Emmerdale characters introduced in 2001 =

Emmerdale is a British soap opera first broadcast on 16 October 1972. The following is a list of characters that first appeared in the show in 2001, by order of first appearance. All characters were introduced by series producer Steve Frost.

== Andrew Fraser ==
Andrew Fraser
- Emmerdale character
- Portrayed by: Mark Elstob
- Duration: 2001–2002
- First appearance: 15 February 2001
- Last appearance: 4 January 2002
- Introduced by: Steve Frost
In-universe information
- Occupation: Stud Farm Manager

Andrew Fraser was an employee at the stud farm at Home Farm, who was employed by Zoe Tate (Leah Bracknell). Andrew began a relationship with Kathy Glover (Malandra Burrows), but was heartbroken when she left Emmerdale for Australia in December 2001. Andrew then left himself in January 2002.

== Ed Wills ==
Ed Wills
- Emmerdale character
- Portrayed by: James Midgley
- First appearance: 22 February 2001
- Last appearance: 20 September 2001
- Introduced by: Steve Frost
In-universe information
- Occupation: Gardener

Ed Wills was the boyfriend of Emily Dingle (Kate McGregor), who she met at St. Mary's Church. They briefly lost contact, but Nicola Blackstock (Nicola Wheeler) encouraged her to find him. Ed liked how Emily allowed him to talk endlessly without telling him to stop. Emily also believed that Ed was a messenger for her late husband Butch Dingle (Paul Loughran), which Ed understood, believing it could be possible as well.

== Cynthia Daggert ==
Cynthia Daggert
- Emmerdale character
- Portrayed by: Kay Purcell
- Duration: 2001–2002
- First appearance: 6 June 2001
- Last appearance: 19 December 2002
- Introduced by: Steve Frost
In-universe information
- Husband: Tony McDonald (backstory)
- Sons: Danny Daggert
- Daughters: Latisha Daggert
- Grandsons: Kirk Daggert
- Nieces: Toni Daggert

Cynthia Daggert and her son, Danny (Cleveland Campbell), only arrived in Emmerdale in June, but already their troubles are piling up. Life got seriously out of hand for the family when Cynthia's heavily pregnant daughter, Latisha (Danielle Henry), joined them. Meanwhile, Cynthia came to blows with Carol Wareing in The Woolpack and the misfortune continued when Latisha goes into labour before even finding her family. Luckily, Jason Kirk happened to be passing and found himself delivering the baby.

After Carol Wareing had shown the family the door at the B&B, they were taken in by Bernice (Samantha Giles) and Ashley Thomas (John Middleton). However, the presence of Latisha's new baby jeopardised this arrangement, adding to Cynthia's trials. "Cynthia was unaware that Bernice has suffered a miscarriage," Kay continued "She only found out after asking if Latisha and the baby can stay and she's absolutely mortified. So Cynthia told the kids to look for anything going, and when Danny found an unused holiday cottage, Cynthia reluctantly moved the family in as squatters – although she really didn't want to break the law." However, the police soon arrived at the cottage following a tip-off. When Cynthia discovered it was Carol who gave them the information, the pair's already stormy relationship reached flashpoint and they came to blows in The Woolpack.

Cynthia and her family were the first black family to appear regularly in Emmerdale.

== Barbara Hope ==
Barbara Hope made her first appearance on 13 June 2001, played by an uncredited actress. Julie Dawn Cole took over the role when the character returned in 2006. Barbara is Bob Hope's ex-wife, and the mother of Josh Hope and Carly Hope.

== Josh Hope ==
Josh Hope
- Emmerdale character
- Portrayed by: Uncredited (2001); Marc Silcock (2006)
- Duration: 2001, 2006
- First appearance: 13 June 2001
- Last appearance: 14 February 2006
- Introduced by: Steve Frost (2001); Kathleen Beedles (2006)
In-universe information
- Father: Bob Hope
- Mother: Barbara Hope
- Stepmother: Viv Hope
- Sisters: Carly Hope
- Half-brothers: Jamie Hope; Heath Hope
- Half-sisters: Dawn Woods; Roxy Lockhart; Cathy Hope
- Uncles: Eddie Hope
- Nephews: T.J. Woods; Billy Hope

Josh Hope is the son of Bob Hope (Tony Audenshaw). He appeared in 2001 and 2006.

Josh is Bob's son by his second marriage, to Barbara. He first appears in 2001, as a young teenager, when Bob visits him and his sister Carly. He returns in 2006 as an 18-year-old for his father's remarriage to Viv Hope (Deena Payne). He only arrives, with Carly and mother Barbara, because Bob pretends to be going blind in an attempt to be reunited with his children. However, the truth soon comes out and they nearly leave the village before the wedding. However, they stay and leave after the wedding, but on good terms with Bob.

== Carly Hope ==
Carly Hope
- Emmerdale character
- Portrayed by: Uncredited (2001); Rebecca Ryan (2006); Gemma Atkinson (2015–2017)
- Duration: 2001, 2006, 2015–2017
- First appearance: Episode 2937; 13 June 2001
- Last appearance: Episode 7841; 2 June 2017
- Introduced by: Steve Frost (2001); Kathleen Beedles (2006); Kate Oates (2015)
In-universe information
- Occupation: Shop assistant
- Father: Bob Hope
- Mother: Barbara Hope
- Stepmother: Viv Hope
- Brothers: Josh Hope
- Half-brothers: Jamie Hope; Heath Hope
- Half-sisters: Dawn Woods; Roxy Lockhart; Cathy Hope
- Sons: Billy Hope
- Uncles: Eddie Hope
- Nephews: T.J. Woods

Carly Hope is the daughter of Bob Hope (Tony Audenshaw). She appeared in 2001 and 2006, played by Rebecca Ryan. On 12 December 2014, it was revealed that Carly would be returning to Emmerdale and that former Hollyoaks star, Gemma Atkinson had been tipped to play her. On 7 January 2015, it was confirmed that Atkinson would be playing Carly and appearing from 11 March 2015.

On 12 December 2014, The Sun reported that Carly would be returning in the new year and the role had been recast to be played by former Hollyoaks and Casualty star, Gemma Atkinson. The report stated how Carly would bring busier times for her father, Bob and his partner, Brenda Walker (Lesley Dunlop) after a quieter year. However, when questioned, an Emmerdale spokesperson did not comment on Atkinson's casting, but confirmed Carly would be returning. On 7 January 2015, Emmerdale confirmed that Atkinson had been cast in the role of Carly and began filming in January 2015. Carly will return on-screen in March, after deciding that Bob has to make up for the time he missed out on when she was a child. In her time away from the village, Carly has been hit by several bad relationships and will be looking for love as she arrives to Emmerdale. Atkinson commented on her new role, "I am absolutely thrilled to be joining the cast of Emmerdale and I cannot wait to see what's in store for Carly. I hope you all enjoy watching her story unfold." Meanwhile, the show's executive producer, Kate Oates said, "I'm delighted to welcome Gemma to the cast. Her character Carly is sure to liven things up for Bob and Brenda and anyone who crosses her path."

On 11 October 2015, it was revealed Atkinson had been offered another one-year contract with the show, keeping Carly on-screen for a further year. It was also revealed Carly would be involved in a big storyline in 2016. Speaking of her contract renewal, Atkinson said: "I'm there for the long term. I've signed for another year – and I'd love to stay for at least a few more. It's really flattering they want me to stay on. The feedback I've been getting from fans and the producers has been great. I've told the producers how happy I am and how much I love the job. After years of working in London it's great to be able to go home after work. When I was in Casualty I was living in a hotel for three years. Now I can get back to Manchester so easily." On 30 May 2017, it was confirmed that Atkinson would be leaving Emmerdale in upcoming episodes. She made her last appearance on 2 June 2017. On 11 September 2017, Atkinson announced that she would be returning to the show after her stint on Strictly Come Dancing, however she does not know when. However, on 8 October 2017, Atkinson stated her return is not certain yet.

Carly is Bob's daughter from his second marriage, to Barbara. She first appears in 2001, when Bob visits her and her brother Josh. She returns in 2006 as a teenager for her father's remarriage to Viv Hope (Deena Payne). She only arrives, with her Josh and mother Barbara, because Bob pretends to be going blind in an attempt to be reunited with his children. However, the truth soon comes out and they leave the village before the wedding. However, they return for the ceremony and leave after the wedding, but on good terms with Bob. During her time in Emmerdale Carly has a brief attraction to Daz Eden (Luke Tittensor) and for a short while they keep in touch via text message.

Carly returns to Emmerdale in March 2015. She reveals that she has been trying to call Bob on his mobile and turns up in a limousine wanting her father to give her away at her wedding. Bob goes with Carly to the ceremony but tries to talk Carly into not going through with the wedding as she has only known her fiancé for four months. Carly and Bob have a row and she eventually throws him out of the car and leaves him by the roadside. Later that day, she arrives at Bob's café having jilted her fiancé and asks to stay with Bob and his partner Brenda Walker (Lesley Dunlop) until she is back on her feet. She immediately clashes with Brenda and is angry with Bob for being absent from her life whilst she was growing up. Carly later flirts with Ross Barton (Michael Parr). She later kisses Ross after they are set up by his mother Emma (Gillian Kearney). They later split after he has an affair with Debbie Dingle (Charley Webb).

In March 2016, Carly revealed to Marlon Dingle (Mark Charnock) that she gave birth to a son four years previously who died from sudden infant death syndrome (SIDS), who she called Billy. Throughout 2016, Marlon comforts Carly and they begin a relationship. In March 2017, Carly is offered a job working as a holiday rep however she turns it down to stay with Marlon and his daughter April, however a few days later April chokes and Carly stares at her in horror without doing anything. Marlon manages to save April but Carly feels guilty about not doing anything to help and rings up to take the job. Carly leaves for Spain but decides she cannot go as she loves April too much. In June 2017 Carly leaves Emmerdale after Marlon proposes to her and after her dead baby Billy's father Matt came to see her putting a strain on her and Marlon's relationship.

== Latisha Daggert ==
Latisha Daggert
- Emmerdale character
- Portrayed by: Danielle Henry
- Duration: 2001–2002, 2006
- First appearance: 9 July 2001
- Last appearance: 27 August 2006
- Introduced by: Steve Frost (2001); Kathleen Beedles (2006)
In-universe information
- Father: Tony McDonald
- Mother: Cynthia Daggert
- Brothers: Danny Daggert
- Sons: Kirk Daggert
- First cousins: Toni Daggert

Latisha Daggert, played by Danielle Henry, made her first appearance on 9 July 2001. Henry auditioned for the role five times before she was cast. She told the Daily Record's Francine Cohen: "I couldn't believe I'd got it. I was convinced I hadn't. She's such a great character with loads of potential. It's fantastic." Henry admitted that she was "petrified" while filming her first scenes in which her character gives birth. Latisha becomes involved with Cain Dingle (Jeff Hordley), leading Henry to state that she must be "fatally attracted to bad boys". Henry thought her character liked Cain because he brought excitement to her life. She told Cohen that the romance was likely "to end in tears" as Latisha had a baby to look after and could not just drop everything to be with Cain. Cohen observed that with "an embarrassing crush" on her gay best friend, a violent former boyfriend and debts, Latisha "has had more highs and lows in her first year in Emmerdale than a big dipper". In July 2002, it was announced that members of the Daggert and Reynolds family were being written out. Henry and co-star Kay Purcell, who played Latisha's mother Cynthia Daggert departed, while Danny Daggert (Cleveland Campbell) remained in the serial. After departing in 2002, Henry reprised the role for a brief time in August 2006 to facilitate Campbell's departure. A writer from the Manchester Evening News described Latisha as a "downtrodden single mum".

After leaving her abusive boyfriend Paul Cooke (Lee Hartney), a pregnant Latisha joins her family in Emmerdale. Jason Kirk (James Carlton) finds Latisha in labour by the side of the road and helps deliver her son in the back of his van. She names the baby Kirk (Alexander Fothergill) after him. She and Jason become close friends. Paul gatecrashes Kirk's christening and causes a fight when her brother, Danny Daggert learns what he did to Latisha. Paul tries to reconcile with Latisha and she almost goes back to Bradford with him, until he punches Jason. After Jason leaves the village, Latisha realises Cain Dingle likes her. She ends up in debt to Charity Tate (Emma Atkins) after she and Cain steal one of Charity's credit cards, and Cain leaves Latisha to pay the bill. Latisha is caught stealing a present for Kirk's birthday, leading her mother, Cynthia Daggert to throw her out of their house. Latisha moves in with Cain's family and his stepmother Lisa Dingle (Jane Cox) tries to get her and Cynthia talking. While out shopping with Danny and Cynthia, Latisha puts a pair of sunglasses into Kirk's pushchair. Cynthia gets blamed for taking the sunglasses when Latisha leaves the pushchair with her. Latisha and Cain's relationship ends when he develops feelings for Angie Reynolds (Freya Copeland), and Latisha moves back in with her family. Jason returns and asks Latisha and her family to move to Lisbon with him, where he is working as a DJ. Latisha, Kirk and Cynthia go with Jason, but Danny decides to stay in the village. A few years later, Latisha returns and persuades Danny to move to Portugal. She also gets revenge on Cain by seducing him and then kneeing him in the groin. Latisha says her goodbyes to Danny and their cousin, Toni Daggert (Kerry Stacey) and returns to Portugal. Danny follows her several days later.

== Kirk Daggert ==
Kirk Daggert
- Emmerdale character
- Portrayed by: Alexander Fothergill
- Duration: 2001–2002
- First appearance: 9 July 2001
- Last appearance: 19 December 2002
- Introduced by: Steve Frost
In-universe information
- Father: Paul Cooke
- Mother: Latisha Daggert
- Grandmothers: Cynthia Daggert
- Uncles: Danny Daggert

Kirk Daggert is the son of Latisha Daggert (Danielle Henry). He appeared from 2001 to 2002.

Kirk is born on 9 July 2001 and named after Jason Kirk (James Carlton), who helped deliver him. He leaves the village with his mother and grandmother in December 2002 to live in Portugal.

== Ray Mullan ==
Ray Mullan
- Emmerdale character
- Portrayed by: Seamus Gubbins
- Duration: 2001–2002
- First appearance: 26 September 2001
- Last appearance: 26 December 2002
- Introduced by: Steve Frost
In-universe information
- Brothers: David Mullan

Ray Mullan was best known for his relationship with Louise Appleton (Emily Symons). He first appeared as a gangster who had Cain Dingle beaten up. He was then announced as the mystery new buyer of Mill Cottage. He seemed keen to help Ashley Thomas (John Middleton) in the church and all that he appeared to have was his dog – Bolan. Rodney Blackstock (Patrick Mower) did not like Ray at first, as Ray had beat him to the purchase of Mill Cottage.

Ray started growing closer to Louise during 2002 and they started going out. But it was obvious that Ray had a darker, more menacing side to him. He got involved with Scott Windsor (Ben Freeman) in a car scam, which was run by one of his right hand men, Tony. But Tony soon disappeared after Ray and Scott talked. Another example of Ray's dodgy side was when he got involved with Chris Tate (Peter Amory) and his wife, Charity (Emma Atkins), through Tate Haulage. He wanted certain goods to be transported, but Charity and Terry Woods (Billy Hartman) soon found out that there were more than just goods in the truck. They discovered that Ray had been bringing illegal immigrants into the country. When Charity confronted Ray, his nasty streak appeared when he pinned Charity up against the wall and threatened her. Despite all this, Louise continued to turn a blind eye to his activities unaware that Ray was hiding more than just his dodgy deals from his girlfriend, he had also hidden the fact that he had diabetes. He proposed to her in September 2002, but she turned him down.

The storyline leading up to Ray's departure started rather simply, with Ray comforting Louise after a stalker started terrorising her. As the ordeal progressed Ray continued to comfort Louise, helping her as she got freaky phone calls, expensive gifts and lingerie through the post. Eventually the situation got so bad that just before Christmas, Ray proposed that he and Louise emigrate to Italy and she agreed but not before leaving a message on her stalker's phone before she left. On the way to the airport, Ray's phone started ringing and she discovered that Ray had two phones and that one phone had a new voicemail message. Despite his attempts to stop her listening to the message, Louise did and heard her own voice. She realised that her stalker was right under her nose the whole time – it was Ray. As Ray started driving erratically, he explained his reasons for stalking her and the car crashed into a ditch. Ray was unconscious, but Louise managed to escape and ran to the village. Ray followed her though and they returned to Mill Cottage and trying to stop him following her, she grabbed a vase and hit Ray with it, knocking him back down the stairs and breaking his neck. Louise managed to cover up his murder and persuaded the police that someone must have broken into the house and killed Ray.

== Maureen Blackstock ==
Maureen Blackstock
- Emmerdale character
- Portrayed by: Joanna Monro
- First appearance: 2 October 2001
- Last appearance: 10 October 2001
- Introduced by: Steve Frost
In-universe information
- Husband: Rodney Blackstock (backstory)
- Daughters: Nicola King
- Granddaughters: Angelica King

Maureen Blackstock is the second wife of Rodney Blackstock (Patrick Mower), who arrived in Emmerdale for their daughter, Nicola Blackstock's (Nicola Wheeler) wedding to chef Carlos Diaz (Gary Turner).

Nicola was due to marry Carlos; however, he was having her affair with her older half-sister, Bernice Thomas (Samantha Giles). This affair was revealed on their wedding day, which meant that Nicola and Carlos did not actually get married. As a result, Maureen punched Carlos and argued with Bernice's mother and Rodney's first wife, Diane Sugden (Elizabeth Estensen). After comforting Nicola, Maureen leaves the village a few days later.

== Brian Addyman ==
Brian Addyman
- Emmerdale character
- Portrayed by: Martin Reeve
- Duration: 2001–2004
- First appearance: 6 November 2001
- Last appearance: 18 February 2004
- Introduced by: Steve November
In-universe information
- Wife: Caroline Kershaw (divorced)
- Sons: Sam Addyman
- Daughters: Katie Addyman; Jodie Addyman
- Grandmothers: Josie

Brian Addyman is the father of Katie Sugden (Sammy Winward), then Addyman. He appeared from 2001 to 2003 and in 2004.

Brian, who brought Katie up, is divorced from her mother Caroline (Daryl Fishwick). Brian first appears in 2001 when he bails Katie out of a police cell after her involvement in a car crash that killed headmistress Barbara Strickland (Alex Hall). In February 2002, Brian becomes the gardener at Home Farm Estates. In February 2003, Brian leaves the village for a new job in Newcastle. In February 2004, Brian attends Katie's wedding to Andy Sugden (Kelvin Fletcher). This is Brian's last on-screen appearance.

In February 2006, Brian and Katie are involved in a car crash while driving back to Emmerdale. Brian is killed and Katie later recovers.

== Craig Calder ==
Craig Calder
- Emmerdale character
- Portrayed by: Jason Hain
- Duration: 2001–2002
- First appearance: 7 November 2001
- Last appearance: 8 August 2002
- Introduced by: Steve Frost
In-universe information
- Father: Dominic Calder
- Mother: Maggie Calder
- Sisters: Lucy Calder

Craig Calder is the eldest of Maggie Calder's children. He supported his parents during the breakup of their marriage. Craig is lazy, but still considers others. He loves Maggie and Lucy, and tries to get on with Phil.

Craig appears with the rest of his family in November 2001. He is not happy with the living arrangements, but that is soon made up for when he takes a look around the village and is impressed by Chloe Atkinson (Amy Nuttall).

After Chloe starts working at the holiday village he flirts with her, making Scott a little jealous. But Chloe gives him the brush off.

In 2002, when Jess leaves he is a little upset. Craig had wanted the new family to work out – but it had not.

After Maggie has a fling with Rodney Blackstock (Patrick Mower), and Phil leaves, Lucy and Craig leave for Scotland with their mother.

== Lucy Calder ==
Lucy Calder
- Emmerdale character
- Portrayed by: Elspeth Brodie
- Duration: 2001–2002
- First appearance: 7 November 2001
- Last appearance: 8 August 2002
- Introduced by: Steve Frost
In-universe information
- Father: Dominic Calder
- Mother: Maggie Calder
- Brothers: Craig Calder

Lucy Calder is Maggie Calder's daughter. She was upset by the breakup of her parents' marriage. She decided to move to the village with her mother.

In November, Lucy appears and is annoyed about sharing a room with Jess. They start getting on, although Lucy supports her mother when Jess tries to break up Maggie and Phil. Lucy also supports her mother when Nicola Blackstock (Nicola Wheeler) makes out that she and Phil are having an affair.

As the months go on Lucy and Katie Addyman (Sammy Winward) become good friends. When Jess leaves the village with her mother Lucy is a little upset as they had become good friends.

In May and June 2002 Katie confides in Lucy about her and Andy's plans to get pregnant. Later, Katie reveals that she is pregnant, and Lucy tries to be as supportive as possible.

After Maggie has a fling with Rodney Blackstock (Patrick Mower), and Phil leaves, Lucy and Craig leave for Scotland with their mother.

== Maggie Calder ==
Maggie Calder
- Emmerdale character
- Portrayed by: Dee Whitehead
- Duration: 2001–2002
- First appearance: 7 November 2001
- Last appearance: 8 August 2002
- Introduced by: Steve Frost
In-universe information
- Husband: Dominic Calder
- Sons: Craig Calder
- Daughters: Lucy Calder

Maggie Calder arrived in the village as an old friend of Rodney Blackstock (Patrick Mower). She moved to Emmerdale to run the holiday village with her boyfriend Phil Weston, her children and Phil's daughter Jess. She had recently been having an affair with Phil. Her marriage had broken up as a result.

Jess and Maggie did not get on, and immediately after their arrival started fighting. There was a minor car accident, in which Phil's car crashed into Maggie's.

As time progressed Jess became friends with Rodney's daughter Nicola (Nicola Wheeler), who did not get on with Maggie either. Nicola did not like Maggie as she got passed over for promotion. She made out that she and Phil were having an affair.

In the end Maggie got very annoyed with Nicola, who was trying to show Rodney that she could not run the holiday village. Maggie found out that Nicola had changed bookings around, so that some guests arrived earlier than expected. This was the last straw for Maggie, who pushed Nicola into the swimming pool.

In early April, Jess left the village with her mother Anne-Marie. Maggie and Phil's relationship was eased slightly without Jess. But soon Nicola's games started again.

Maggie embarked on an affair with Rodney and he and Phil had a fight when the truth came out. Phil dumped Maggie and left the village. Shortly afterwards, Maggie left the village with Craig and Lucy and moved to Scotland.

== Phil Weston ==
Phil Weston
- Emmerdale character
- Portrayed by: Mark Jardine
- Duration: 2001–2002
- First appearance: 7 November 2001
- Last appearance: 19 July 2002
- Introduced by: Steve Frost
In-universe information
- Wife: Anne-Marie Weston (until 2001)
- Daughters: Jess Weston

Phil Weston arrived with his girlfriend Maggie Calder, her children and his daughter Jess. He had recently split up with his alcoholic wife, Anne-Marie. Jess and Maggie did not see eye to eye at all. They fought over minor things.

Phil was stuck in the middle, but got on with Craig and Lucy. Jess continued to try to break up the new family and soon teamed up with Nicola Blackstock (Nicola Wheeler). Nicola plotted against Maggie, and was very friendly towards Phil.

But Maggie and Phil's relationship survived. In the end Jess left the village with her mother. Phil was upset about this, but soon got over it. Phil got a job working for Tate Trash.

He left the village in July 2002, a few months after arriving, when he found out Maggie had an affair with Rodney Blackstock (Patrick Mower).

== Jess Weston ==
Jess Weston
- Emmerdale character
- Portrayed by: Ruth Abram
- Duration: 2001–2002
- First appearance: 7 November 2001
- Last appearance: 9 April 2002
- Introduced by: Steve Frost
In-universe information
- Father: Phil Weston
- Mother: Anne-Marie Weston

Jess Weston is the mature, yet scheming daughter of Phil and Anne-Marie Weston. She instantly disliked her father's new partner Maggie Calder, and did not hide this fact, opting to try and break up her father's relationship.

At Christmas, Jess visited her mother, but was late back from her break. Phil got worried and drove down to try to find her. This continued to put strain on her father's relationship.

Jess even teamed up with Nicola Blackstock (Nicola Wheeler) to try to bring down the new family.

Although she did not like Maggie, Jess found friend's with Lucy and Craig. They got on very well together. When Jess left the village in April 2002, a few months after she arrived, after her mother turned up, everyone was sad to see her go.
