= List of Emmerdale characters introduced in 2000 =

The following is a list of characters that first appeared in the British soap opera Emmerdale in 2000, by order of first appearance.

== Carlos Diaz ==
Carlos Diaz
- Emmerdale character
- Portrayed by: Gary Turner
- Duration: 2000–2001, 2004
- First appearance: 9 March 2000
- Last appearance: 17 May 2004
- Introduced by: Kieran Roberts (2000); Steve Frost (2004)
In-universe information
- Occupation: Chef

Carlos Diaz, portrayed by Gary Turner, made his first appearance on 9 March 2000. Turner departed the series in 2001, but reprised the role for a guest stint in 2004.

Carlos arrives in the village as a chef and later begins a relationship with Nicola Blackstock (Nicola Wheeler). Carlos begins an affair with Nicola's half-sister, Bernice Thomas (Samantha Giles). Carlos proposes to Nicola when he thinks she is pregnant and she accepts. Bernice understands that Carlos is only in a relationship with Nicola because she is pregnant, but when she learns that this is not true, she is horrified and insists that Nicola tell Carlos. Angry at Nicola's lies, Carlos tells her about his relationship with Bernice and that she could be expecting his baby at their wedding. Nicola reacts badly and attacks Carlos with her bouquet, before telling the congregation about the affair, stunning her father Rodney Blackstock (Patrick Mower) and Bernice's ex-husband, Ashley Thomas (John Middleton). The wedding is cancelled and Carlos leaves the village after learning that Ashley is the father of Bernice's child. Three years later, Carlos returns to the village, to Nicola's shock. He learns that Bernice has left the village and despite initially deciding to stay, he changes his mind and leaves again.

== Adam Forrester ==
Adam Forrester
- Emmerdale character
- Portrayed by: Tim Vincent
- Duration: 2000–2001
- First appearance: 21 March 2000
- Last appearance: 16 January 2001
- Introduced by: Kieran Roberts
In-universe information
- Occupation: Veterinary surgeon

Adam Forrester, played by Tim Vincent, made his first appearance on 21 March 2000. Vincent said he was "really excited" when he was approached to play the role. Adam marked his first major acting role since he appeared in Dangerfield in 1997. Vincent was initially contracted until November 2000, and he commuted between his home in London and the studios in Leeds.

The character was introduced during the aftermath of a bus crash, where he earned the respect of the villagers by helping the injured. Adam moves to the village to work at the local veterinary practice. Vincent told Rachel Corcoran of All About Soap that his character has "very good intentions" upon his arrival. He is "confident" and has many new ideas about how to run the practice. However, Adam's approach annoys his new boss Paddy Kirk (Dominic Brunt). Vincent said, "Adam is genuinely a nice guy and everyone likes him, But Paddy's constantly telling him how things are run at the surgery while Adam says 'No, this is the way I'll do it' before doing it his way. And it seems to work, much to Paddy's annoyance."

Vincent explained that Adam does not realise he is annoying Paddy, and he is not being deliberately nasty to him, but Paddy worries that their clients will think Adam is the better vet. Paddy is also put out because Adam took all the glory during the crash, while he could not help out because he had a broken wrist. Marlon Dingle (Mark Charnock) is also not happy with Adam when he dates Tricia Stokes (Sheree Murphy), who he has feelings for. Vincent added that Adam is unaware of what he is doing to Paddy and Marlon, and he has no idea that they are waiting for him to fall.

== Gloria Weaver ==
Gloria Weaver
- Emmerdale character
- Portrayed by: Janice McKenzie
- Duration: 2000–2004
- First appearance: 30 May 2000
- Last appearance: 6 February 2004
In-universe information
- Occupation: MP (2002–2003)
- Husband: Eric Pollard (2002–2003)

Gloria Weaver (previously Pollard) is the fourth wife of Eric Pollard (Chris Chittell). She was portrayed by veteran actress Janice McKenzie and appeared on a recurring basis between 2000 and 2004.

== Bishop George Postlethwaite ==
Bishop George Postlethwaite
- Emmerdale character
- Portrayed by: Peter Cartwright
- Duration: 2000, 2002–2010
- First appearance: 7 June 2000
- Last appearance: 29 January 2010
- Introduced by: Kieran Roberts (2000); Steve Frost (2003, 2004); Kathleen Beedles (2007)
In-universe information
- Occupation: Bishop

George Postlethwaite, Bishop of Skipdale is the local bishop and Ashley Thomas' (John Middleton) boss. He has appeared from 2000 to 2010 and was often known as Bishop George.

George first appears when Edna Birch (Shirley Stelfox) writes to complain to him about Ashley's public courtship of Bernice Blackstock (Samantha Giles).

Several years later, when Ashley decides he wants to marry Laurel Potts (Charlotte Bellamy), George is against the marriage as he believes that Ashley is rushing into things. Ashley announced his resignation from the priesthood - so he could marry - to the shock of the Bishop. Ashley later withdraws his resignation, causing George to once again say that Ashley is quick to make decisions. Eventually, the Bishop gives his approval and marries the couple in November 2005. Among the ceremonies he has conducted include the marriage of Tom King (Kenneth Farrington) and Rosemary Sinclair (Linda Thorson) on Christmas Day 2006 when Ashley's been wrongfully punched by Terry Woods and the baptism of the Hope twins in May 2007. He also appears to judge village competitions.

When the death of his housekeeper leaves George lonely, Laurel tries to matchmake him with Emily Kirk (Kate McGregor), despite the age gap between the two. While Emily and George spend more time with each other, he is persuading her to become a priest. In October 2008, Bishop George announces that Emmerdale's village church, St. Mary's, is to close due to low attendance at services. The congregation, organised by Nicola De Souza (Nicola Wheeler), start a village choir and enter a competition, where they win an effort award. However, the church is still to be sold to Eric Pollard (Chris Chittell) and the last service will be on Christmas Day 2008. However, on Christmas Day, Nicola organises a sit-in at the Church and invites all the press including Calendar. This causes Eric to pull out of buying the site, and the Bishop tells Ashley the following day that he may continue services in the church until a new buyer is found. He returns in January to tell the Thomas' that the church has been bought and they must be prepared to leave. However, the following day the church's new owners, Mark (Maxwell Caulfield) and Natasha Wylde (Amanda Donohoe), give the church back to the community and Ashley keeps his job. In February 2009, he visits the village when Ashley and Laurel have to tell him that Jasmine Thomas (Jenna-Louise Coleman) has run away after murdering someone while Laurel is being charged with perverting the course of justice. He appears frequently during Sally Spode's (Siân Reeves) time in the village. Her husband was a vicar who he thought was abusing her so sent him to a health retreat. In 2010, he realises that it is Sally who is ruining the Thomas family's lives and apologises.

== Virginia West ==
Virginia West
- Emmerdale character
- Portrayed by: Bridget Fry
- Duration: 2000-2001
- First appearance: 15 June 2000
- Last appearance: 10 August 2001
- Introduced by: Kieran Roberts

Virginia West was a lady who Adam Forrester (Tim Vincent) cheated on Tricia Stokes (Sheree Murphy) with. She appeared regularly in Emmerdale between 2000 and 2001 until Tara Thornfield (Anna Brecon) agreed to drop assault charges against Virginia if she left the village.

== Caleb Dingle ==
Caleb Dingle
- Emmerdale character
- Portrayed by: Mike Kelly
- Appears on: 26 September 2000
- Introduced by: Kieran Roberts
In-universe information
- Father: Jedediah Dingle
- Mother: Peg Dingle
- Brothers: Zak Dingle; Shadrach Dingle; Albert Dingle; Ezra Dingle; Zebediah Dingle
- Wife: Vera-Lynn Dingle (1976–1978); Unnamed Woman (1979–)
- Daughters: Mandy Dingle
- Grandfathers: Jonah Dingle
- Uncles: Bert Dingle
- Nephews: Nathan Dingle; Butch Dingle; Ben Dingle; Cain Dingle; Sam Dingle; Marlon Dingle; Eli Dingle
- Nieces: Tina Dingle; Belle Dingle; Chas Dingle; Lilith Dingle; Del Dingle; Gennie Walker
- First cousins: Obadiah Dingle; Solomon Dingle; Elvis Dingle; Marilyn Dingle

Caleb Dingle is the father of Mandy Dingle (Lisa Riley) and the brother of Zak Dingle (Steve Halliwell). He appeared in 2000 to reunite with his daughter.

Married firstly to Vera-Lynn, with whom he had Mandy, he remarried secondly and gained four stepsons.

== Joe Fisher ==
Joe Fisher
- Emmerdale character
- Portrayed by: Edward Baker-Duly
- Duration: 2000–2001
- First appearance: 27 September 2000
- Last appearance: 5 November 2001
- Introduced by: Kieran Roberts
In-universe information
- Wife: Tricia Stokes (2000-2002)

Joe Fisher was introduced as the Australian boyfriend of Jason Kirk (James Carlton). The couple's future was however uncertain when Joe found out his Visa would expire by Christmas and he would be forced to leave the country. As a result, he needed to get married in order to stay, so he married Tricia Stokes (Sheree Murphy), despite the opposition from her partner Marlon Dingle (Mark Charnock).

Joe and Tricia, along with Jason made up a false relationship history. Edna Birch (Shirley Stelfox) threatened to report them to the Home Office, but the wedding went ahead and Jason was thrilled when Joe got permanent residency in the UK. Their relationship didn't last long and Joe left Emmerdale in January 2001. He returned in November 2001, asking Tricia for a divorce.

== Bev Mansfield ==
Bev Mansfield
- Emmerdale character
- Portrayed by: Sarah Malin
- Duration: 2000–2001
- First appearance: 3 October 2000
- Last appearance: 18 May 2001
- Introduced by: Kieran Roberts
In-universe information
- Occupation: Chemistry Teacher

Bev Mansfield was a chemistry teacher at Hotten Comprehensive who was introduced as a love interest for Paddy Kirk (Dominic Brunt). The pair began as friends and continued to bond over their disastrous love-lives. Bev later has a one-night-stand with Adam Forrester (Tim Vincent).

Marc Reynolds (Anthony Lewis) attempted to kiss Bev and rumours that they were having a sexual relationship spread around the village. After getting tired and frustrated at the rumours, Bev left the village and took a new job away from Emmerdale.

== Carol Wareing ==
Carol Wareing
- Emmerdale character
- Portrayed by: Helen Pearson
- Duration: 2000–2001
- First appearance: 17 November 2000
- Last appearance: 13 July 2001
- Introduced by: Kieran Roberts
In-universe information
- Husband: Gordon Wareing

Carol Wareing, played by Helen Pearson, made her first appearance on 17 November 2000. Pearson departed the series in 2001. Carol arrives as an old friend of Viv Windsor (Deena Payne). She and Cynthia Daggert (Kay Purcell) came to blows in The Woolpack public house. She leaves the village after her husband Gordon arrives.

== Faith Dingle ==
Faith Dingle
- Emmerdale character
- Portrayed by: Gillian Jephcott (2000–2004); Sally Dexter (2017–2025); Fleur Keith (2017 flashback)
- Duration: 2000, 2004, 2017–2019, 2021–2022, 2025
- First appearance: Episode 2798; 30 November 2000
- Last appearance: Episode 10438; 12 November 2025
- Introduced by: Keith Richardson (2000, 2004); Iain MacLeod (2017, 2025); Jane Hudson (2021)
In-universe information
- Occupation: Barmaid
- Husband: Shadrach Dingle (backstory); Brian Roberts (2014–2016)
- Sons: Cain Dingle; Caleb Miligan
- Daughters: Chas Dingle
- Stepdaughters: Eileen Roberts
- Grandsons: Aaron Dingle; Nate Robinson; Nicky Miligan; Kyle Dingle; Isaac Dingle
- Granddaughters: Debbie Dingle; Grace Dingle; Eve Dingle; Steph Miligan (adoptive)
- Other relatives: Sarah Sugden; Jack Sugden; Frankie Robinson

Faith Dingle made her first appearance on 30 November 2000. The character was originally played by Gillian Jephcott. Faith was introduced as the former wife of Shadrach Dingle (Andy Devine), and mother of Cain Dingle (Jeff Hordley) and Chas Dingle (Lucy Pargeter). Jephcott reprised the role in 2004. In March 2016, it was announced that the character would be returning, and she made her return on 6 February 2017, this time played by Sally Dexter. However, upon this return, she was credited for her first couple of episodes as Woman in Barn, since her identity was kept a secret. Fleur Keith briefly portrayed Faith in a special flashback episode, which was originally broadcast on 17 November 2017. On 7 October 2019, it was announced that Dexter would be leaving the soap. Her final scenes aired in the episode broadcast on 25 October 2019; however, in 2021, it was announced that Dexter would be reprising her role as Faith and she returned in the episode broadcast on 25 February 2021.

Faith is the mother of Cain and Chas Dingle, grandmother of Aaron Dingle (Danny Miller), Kyle Winchester (Huey Quinn) and Debbie Dingle (Charley Webb) and great-grandmother of Sarah Sugden (Katie Hill) and Jack Sugden (Seth Ball). In her backstory, she had an affair with Shadrach's brother, Zak Dingle (Steve Halliwell), who is Cain's father. First appearing in 2000, Faith returns to Emmerdale in October 2004 for celebrations to mark Zak and his family's 10th anniversary in the village. She tries to get to know Debbie, but Cain does not let her.

Years later, Faith is found hiding in the barn at Wishing Well Cottage and meets Sarah, who does not know who she is. She asks Sarah to keep her presence secret and to supply her with things. When Debbie becomes suspicious of Sarah's behaviour, she takes her to meet Faith, only to find she has gone. At the B&B, Faith collapses in the bathroom and is found by Doug Potts (Duncan Preston), who calls an ambulance. When Faith is taken outside, she sees Cain and Chas, who are not pleased to see her. While in hospital, it emerges that she is Sarah's benefactor, having made herself penniless by donating £20,000 for Sarah's cancer treatment. At Aaron's wedding to Robert Sugden (Ryan Hawley), a woman arrives with the police and tells them that Faith murdered her father. After an emotional heart-to-heart with Chas, Faith rejects a hug from her, leaving Chas furious and heartbroken. It is later revealed that Faith has had a double mastectomy after battling breast cancer. It also emerges that Faith pushed Kim Tate (Claire King) over a balcony and into a champagne fountain after Kim had insulted the Dingle family. Faith was one of three suspects, but Charity Dingle (Emma Atkins) confronts her after she accuses her son, Noah Dingle (Jack Downham), of committing the crime.

Laura-Jayne Tyler of Inside Soap praised Faith's reintroduction, describing Faith as "a wonderfully wicked addition" and "fun, frivolours and feisty". She added, "we're under no illusion that she can also be an evil cow when she wants to be! Bring on the episode where we get the nitty-gritty on why her kids hate her so much..." In August 2017, Dexter was longlisted for Best Newcomer and Funniest Female at the Inside Soap Awards. Both nominations made the shortlist. Dexter did not win either of awards. She was also nominated for the Best Newcomer accolade at The British Soap Awards 2017, however, she lost out to Coronation Street's Rob Mallard. Duncan Lindsay from Metro praised Keith's portrayal of Faith in the 2017 flashback episode, giving the actress a "particular nod" as she was "incredibly loyal to Sally Dexter's portrayal of Faith and seriously looked the part too".

On 11 May 2022, Emmerdale announced that they would revisit Faith's breast cancer in a storyline that sees her diagnosed with terminal cancer. The soap worked with British charity Breast Cancer Now who were appointed to provide guidance on Faith's diagnosis and experience of cancer. They also hoped to raise awareness for symptoms of secondary breast cancer to viewers. Dexter felt a strong sense of responsibility to portray the storyline accurately as she acknowledged that the disease is more than a storyline for sufferers of cancer; she also felt privileged to be given the topical storyline. Emmerdale producer Laura Shaw was excited for Faith to be a prominent character on the soap during the storyline, since she had faith in Dexter's acting ability. Shaw noted how despite the "painful and heart wrenching moments" viewers would endure, Faith would also be able to offer "life affirming and positive moments of light in the story" due to the character's upbeat attitude and humour. It was later announced that as part of her cancer battle, a special episode would air heavily featuring Faith, Chas and Cain. She is told that her chemotherapy is not working and she decides to stop the treatment. The episode, which aired in July, explores the impact Faith's terminal diagnosis has on the lives of her children "as they navigate this heartbreaking turn of events". This led to Faith's departure from Emmerdale when she decided to end her life on 13 October 2022. She died in Cain's arms. The character last appeared on screen on 28 October 2022 during her funeral. In an unannounced return, Dexter reprised the role for a flashback, which was originally broadcast on 12 November 2025; Dexter called it was "delightful" to return and said that she had been practising an Australian accent in case producers wanted her to play Faith's cousin, who she jokingly called "Hope".
