= Bernice Blackstock =

Fictional character from Emmerdale

- Emmerdale character
- Portrayed by: Samantha Giles
- Duration: 1998–2002, 2004, 2012–2019, 2021–2023, 2025
- First appearance: 25 November 1998
- Last appearance: 18 September 2025
- Introduced by: Keith Richardson (1998, 2004); Stuart Blackburn (2012); Jane Hudson (2021); Iain MacLeod (2025)
In-universe information
- Other names: Bernice Thomas; Bernice White
- Occupation: Barmaid; Pub Landlady; Businesswoman; Beautician
- Father: Rodney Blackstock
- Mother: Diane Sugden
- Stepfather: Jack Sugden
- Half-brothers: Paul Lambert
- Half-sisters: Nicola King
- Husband: Anthony Binns (backstory); Ashley Thomas (2000–2002); Charlie (2004–2012); Lawrence White (2015–2016)
- Daughters: Gabby Thomas; Dee Dee
- Stepdaughters: Chrissie White (2015-16); Rebecca White (2015-16)
- Grandsons: Thomas Tate
- Aunts: Val Pollard
- Nieces: Angelica King
- First cousins: Paul Lambert; Sharon Lambert

Bernice Blackstock (previously Thomas and White) is a fictional character from the ITV soap opera Emmerdale, played by Samantha Giles. She made her first on screen appearance on 25 November 1998. Since her initial stint that lasted four years, Giles has departed and returned to the role numerous times, with the latest return that aired in 2025.

== Development ==
=== Relationship with Ashley Thomas ===
Bernice begins a relationship with the local vicar, Ashley Thomas (John Middleton). Ashley falls in love with Bernice but does not have the courage to tell her. He finds himself in a "right state" when he shares a tent with Bernice during a camping trip. As Middleton told Claire Brand from Inside Soap, Ashley could not handle scenarios involving females and now "he has to spend time with this woman who he clearly adores". While Ashley worries about the arrangement, Bernice remains "ignorant" to his feelings. The actor thought that Bernice had never contemplated a relationship with Ashley. He added that even "Ashley doesn't think Bernice would give him a second look even if he did tell her how he feels." The storyline had gained momentum off-screen as viewers had written to Middleton demanding a relationship between the two characters. While Inside Soap ran a poll which determined that readers wanted Bernice to leave Gavin Ferris (Robert Beck) in favour of Ashley. When the bishop learns of their romance he offers Ashley a job in Leeds, but Bernice does not like the idea. Giles told a writer from Inside Soap that her character is reluctant to leave the village because "for once in her life, she has got some stability and she doesn't want to change that." Ashley tries to persuade Bernice to move by taking her to visit his potential work place; but Bernice is not impressed. Giles explained that Bernice dislikes it and she feels depressed. While she accepts Ashley's beliefs, his relationship with the God creates problems during decision making. The actress added that Bernice "naively thought that if they got engaged – their problems would be solved."

=== Affair with Carlos Diaz ===
Bernice later has an affair with Carlos Diaz (Gary Turner). Carlos is engaged to Bernice's half-sister Nicola Blackstock (Nicola Wheeler). However, when Bernice's mother Diane Blackstock (Elizabeth Estensen) discovers their affair, she forces them to end it. Turner told a reporter from Inside Soap that Bernice and Carlos have tried to end their affair, but they have "fallen madly, passionately in love". The twosome know that "they need" to be together but cannot be truthful due to the fear of hurting their partners. Diane is initially "instrumental" in stopping the affair, but she soon realises they are seeing one another again. Turner explained that Diane wants Bernice and Carlos to see how much hurt their actions will cause. Carlos wants to make Diane realise that his and Bernice's feelings are "more than just a petty affair". Carlos attempts to tell Nicola the truth, but cannot, so he ends his affair with Bernice. Turner said that Bernice cannot believe it and "begs him to reconsider"; as he will not a "devastated" Bernice fires Carlos from The Woolpack. The actor concluded that Carlos should not be deterred by Bernice's actions – "if they try and deny their feelings now, it'll cause more pain for everyone in the long run."

=== Departure and return ===
In September 2019, Giles announced her exit from Emmerdale. She stated that after seven "fabulous years", she wanted to leave to pursue other creative projects. Giles said that while she will miss the friends she had made on the soap, she was excited to pursue "pastures new". Giles filmed her final scenes on 16 October 2019, and tweeted that she "shall miss the laughs and [has] made some great friends", but "sometimes it's good to leave the party when you're having a good time". Producer Kate Brooks told Inside Soap that they had written Giles' exit into the soap, which saw her "run a gauntlet of emotions". They wanted her exit to be believable, as they felt that Bernice is an iconic character and had to "make sure that we did her character justice". Her final scenes aired on 28 November 2019 when Bernice emigrates to Australia with daughter Dee Dee (Mia Gibson-Reed).

In June 2020, Giles revealed to Inside Soap that her exit storyline underwhelmed her and admitted that she wished that her character had been killed off. She felt that if Bernice had been killed off, she would have had received "a better exit story". Despite this, she felt that it was kind of the producers to "leave the door open" for her to return. Giles also told OK! magazine that producers did not want her to leave, but she wanted to pursue other projects. In April 2021, it was announced that Giles had made the decision to return to Emmerdale. She explained that her break from the soap meant that she could write and publish two books. Emmerdale producers asked her to return, and since she is "a big believer in fate", Giles "took it as a sign that it was meant to be" and accepted. Giles said that her character "arrives back with a bang" and felt that the audience would be entertained with her return storyline. Due to her return coinciding with the COVID-19 pandemic, Giles initially wore a wig since the hairdressers were not allowed to be within two metres. She felt that she would be unable to style her hair herself and therefore wore a wig for ease. She eventually stopped wearing it due to bad comments.

== Storylines ==
=== 1998–2004 ===
Bernice arrives in the village and finds work as a barmaid at the Woolpack. Initially, she does not like Tricia Stokes (Sheree Murphy), but after they discover their partners – Gavin Ferris (Robert Beck) and Jason Kirk (James Carlton) – are having an affair, they become good friends. In April 1999, it is revealed that Bernice, originally from down south, came to Leeds by closing her eyes and pointing at a map. The reason - she left her husband Anthony after finding him in bed with another man. Bernice calls off her engagement to Gavin, who was unfaithful with her friend, Stella Jones (Stephanie Schonfield). She then becomes the landlady of The Woolpack thanks to a bequest from the guilt-ridden Stella. Bernice begins a relationship with the local vicar, Ashley. After getting Bishop George's (Peter Cartwright) blessing, they marry on Christmas Day. Bernice is given away by her mother, Diane, even though her father, Rodney (Patrick Mower), is in attendance.

Bernice falls pregnant but miscarries. In her grief, she lashes out at Ashley and he takes a temporary job away from the village as he feels unable to help her. Bernice, however, feels abandoned and begins an affair with Carlos but this is complicated when Bernice discovers she is pregnant again but doesn't know who the father is. Bernice's half-sister, Nicola, arrives in the village and begins dating Carlos. She is clearly keener on him than he is on her but they later announce that they are getting married and expecting a baby but on her hen night, Nicola admits that she is not pregnant but felt it was the only way to get Carlos to settle down with her. Bernice makes Nicola tell Carlos the truth and in revenge for Nicola's lies, Carlos tells her that he and Bernice are together and he could be the father of her baby. Nicola promptly tells the village about this, devastating Ashley, and he asks her to move out. Bernice, feeling guilty for hurting Ashley, tries to make amends but Ashley is not interested and during another argument, they realise Bernice is in labour, so he takes her to hospital where she has a daughter who she names Gabby (Annelise Manojlovic). Bernice hopes Carlos is Gabby's father but a paternity test reveals she is Ashley's child, leading Ashley and Bernice to reconcile. However, Bernice's doubts about her marriage, in addition to her postnatal depression, cause more problems between the couple. After Gabby's christening, Bernice tells Ashley that she does not love him any more. Finding living in Emmerdale too difficult, Bernice takes a job on a cruiseliner, leaving Gabby with Ashley and the couple get divorced off-screen.

Bernice returns in 2004 to attend Tricia's funeral. Now living in Brighton, she tells her father that she wants Gabby to live with her but when she goes to discuss the idea with Ashley, she sees how close he and Gabby are and realises that it would be unfair to take Gabby away. Bernice returns to Brighton, leaving Ashley and Diane unaware of her intentions. Bernice gets engaged to her partner, Charlie. They get married and she gives birth to another daughter who she names Diane, after her mother.

=== 2012–2025 ===
Bernice returns to the village to see Diane and admits that her marriage to husband Charlie is over. Her ex-husband Ashley asks Bernice what her intentions are towards their daughter Gabby and she states that she wants to spend more time with her. Ashley and his wife Laurel Thomas (Charlotte Bellamy) tell Bernice that they need to set some ground rules, particularly when Bernice asks Laurel to take a back seat, much to Ashley and Laurel's anger as Laurel has played a much bigger part in Gabby's upbringing than Bernice. Diane and Rodney later learn that Bernice has been having an affair. They confront her and Bernice reveals that she is in love with a man named Steve and she is waiting for him to leave his wife. Bernice's half-sister Nicola takes matters into her own hands and informs Steve's wife about her husband's relationship with Bernice and she throws him out, so he joins Bernice in the village. The only thing that Bernice is now unhappy about is that Charlie is awkward about allowing her access to their daughter so she goes to visit him, hoping to persuade him to be more reasonable. Bernice becomes Acting landlady of The Woolpack working alongside Chas Dingle (Lucy Pargeter) while Diane is away in Brighton. Diane returns weeks later to inform everyone that she is moving to Australia and is selling her share of The Woolpack. Bernice has high hopes of buying Diane's share and becoming landlady again as does Chas. Diane eventually reveals that she has decided to stay and takes The Woolpack off the market dashing Bernice's dreams of owning the pub again.

In October 2013, Bernice, along with many other villagers including Diane and Nicola, are held hostage in the Woolpack by Cameron Murray (Dominic Power). He orders for Bernice to give him the pub's keys, and if she threatens him in any way, he will shoot and kill Diane with a gun he has stolen. Bernice, Diane, Nicola and the others are all eventually released by Cameron, but he keeps Chas and Debbie Dingle (Charley Webb) hostage. In 2014, Bernice is stunned to hear that Diane has slept with Eric Pollard (Chris Chittell), the husband of Diane's sister, Val (Charlie Hardwick), but sticks up for her mother. Bernice then enters internet dating and meets a man named Anton Bluth (Andrew Dowbiggin). She tells him that her name is "Beverley", and they arrange to meet up at Nicola and her husband Jimmy's (Nick Miles) house. Bernice believes that she and Anton are going to have sex, but when they get to the bedroom, Anton handcuffs her to the bed and steals most of Jimmy and Nicola's belongings. Bernice is humiliated and ashamed and she vows to get revenge on Anton. She gets Nicola involved, forcing her to pretend to be a woman named "Bernice", who has fallen in love with Anton. When Anton begins pestering her, Nicola panics and hides in the toilets, where she calls Bernice. When Bernice arrives, Anton is nowhere to be seen. She then kicks one of the toilet cubical doors, and knocks Anton unconscious, leaving him with a nose-bleed. Bernice then strips him off and ties him to the toilet, and takes photos of him on his mobile phone. She then blackmails him into getting Jimmy and Nicola's belongings back.

In March 2014, she begins to plan opening a salon in the area. Despite the fact that most people seem relatively uninterested, Bernice holds a brainstorming session with Val, Alicia Gallagher (Natalie Anderson), David Metcalfe (Matthew Wolfenden) amongst others. However, it is ruined when Val reveals to Alicia that her son Jacob (Joe-Warren Plant) has been stealing items from her and David's shop to sell at school. Kerry Wyatt (Laura Norton) begs Bernice to let her work in the salon, as she is a beautician and hairdresser without qualifications. She gives Pearl Ladderbanks (Meg Johnson) and Betty Eagleton (Paula Tilbrook) a makeover to try to prove herself. Declan Macey (Jason Merrells) lets Bernice rent Pear Tree Cottage, even though her brother-in-law Jimmy works there already. Andy Sugden (Kelvin Fletcher) agrees to help her set up the salon and she gives him a free massage to thank him, but he is embarrassed and leaves when his ex-girlfriend Kerry arrives. He then agrees to help her again and she makes a pass at him and the pair end up kissing and having sex. They begin a relationship in secret, although it is soon rumbled when they are caught in the salon by Nicola, Rodney and Kerry. When Andy is involved in a severe farming accident, Bernice tries her best to help him, but later reveals in a conversation with Chas that she finds herself irritating Andy. She is later horrified when she spots Andy and his ex-wife Katie (Sammy Winward) kissing in the street. After drinking a bottle of wine, Bernice storms over to Katie and slaps her publicly, before descending into a catfight. As Chas and Finn Barton (Joe Gill) try and stop the fight, Katie slaps Bernice to try and stop her from attacking her. Bernice then grabs Finn's sausages and hits Katie with them and when Andy arrives, she does the same to him. Bernice then humiliates Katie in front of Leyla Harding (Roxy Shahidi) before leaving the village for Australia.

Bernice returns to the village a few weeks later and is determined to win Andy back. She is unaware, however, that Andy and Katie are now an item. When Bernice learns of this, she throws spaghetti carbonara over Katie before storming off. While confiding in Nicola, one of Bernice's clients from the salon informs her that she would be perfect for a modelling job, which she delightedly accepts. When Bernice arrives at the shoot, however, she is stunned to learn that she has to be naked for the job, as she thought she would be modelling clothes. When she arrives home, she tells Nicola that she turned the job down. Following the death of Katie, Bernice helps Andy through his grief, but she is stunned when Andy attempts to kiss her. After he attempts to force himself on her, she slaps him, promptly making him leave. Later, after Nicola leaves for Dubai, Bernice helps out Jimmy. She later becomes fed up of watching after him and demands he hire a maid, only for him to give the job to Tracy Shankley (Amy Walsh). Bernice is not impressed as she deliberately winds her up. She is later convinced that Tracy is stealing her belongings, leading to Bernice and Tracy having a catfight in front of Diane. Gabby eventually admits that she has been doing the deeds.

Bernice falls in love with Lawrence White (John Bowe) and they quickly become engaged, despite Lawrence being unable to perform sexually. Unsure that Lawrence will be able to satisfy her completely in the absence of a sexual relationship, Bernice has a one-night stand with Andy during her hen night. Prepared to leave Lawrence for Andy, Bernice is disappointed when Andy says it was a mistake and that he cannot commit to a relationship with her as he is still grieving for Katie. The next day — the day of the wedding — Bernice decides to come clean to Lawrence, although his daughter Chrissie White (Louise Marwood) has already told him after witnessing Bernice and Andy together. To her surprise, Lawrence does not seem worried and offers Bernice the chance to have an open marriage if she feels a sexless marriage will not satisfy her. Bernice is surprised by this and they decides to call the wedding off. Whilst Lawrence prepares to tell the already concerned guests about the wedding being called off, Bernice arrives, much to the surprise and delight of Lawrence, as she decides that she still loved him. Unbeknownst to Bernice, Andy had meanwhile had a change of mind and decided to tell Bernice he cared for her and wanted to give their relationship a try. Seeing Bernice walking down the aisle from a distance, Andy feels it is too late and leaves without saying anything. The ceremony carries on as planned and Bernice marries Lawrence.

Bernice's marriage to Lawrence puts her at odds with Chrissie and her son Lachlan White (Thomas Atkinson). Bernice lies and tells Nicola and Andy that she and Lawrence finally slept together when, in reality, he could not perform. When Bernice discovers that Lawrence's old friend Ronnie Hale (John McArdle) is gay and remembering a letter that she had seen months prior that was assumed to be written to Lawrence's late wife Ellen, she realises that it was actually to Lawrence and that he and Ronnie were lovers. Bernice confronts him and he again denies being gay. She tells him to go on a plane to Dubai, for their surprise second honeymoon, alone and states that he never should have asked her to marry him. After going on a holiday to clear her head, she returns and moves in with Diane and her partner and Douglas Potts (Duncan Preston) at their house Brook Cottage. But after she returns Lawrence becomes bitter towards everyone and everything including throwing Andy, Chrissie and Lachlan out of Home Farm and evicting, "Beauty & Bernice", from its premises at Pear Tree Cottage however, after the shooting, he returns the salon to Bernice. Before the shooting, Bernice begins sleeping with Andy again, despite him now being in a serious relationship with Chrissie. She discovers Andy's betrayal and after Lachlan shoots Lawrence, Chrissie frames Andy for the crime. Andy escapes custody during his trial and returns to Emmerdale, where Chrissie frames him for trying to kill her with a knife, however he meets with Bernice and he asks her to run away with him. She tells him that she cannot but they agree to wait for one another and Andy flees the country. After this, Bernice teams up with Andy's adoptive brother Robert Sugden (Ryan Hawley) to get revenge on Chrissie.

== Reception ==
For her portrayal of Bernice, Giles was nominated for Most Popular Newcomer at the 1999 National Television Awards. In 2000, she earned a nomination for Best Actress. At the TV Quick Awards, Giles won Best Soap Actress. She then garnered nominations for Best Actress, Sexiest Female and Best On-Screen Partnership with Middleton at the 2002 British Soap Awards.

During a feature on the "wild women" of Emmerdale, a writer for the Daily Mirror said "Bernice personifies everything prim and proper compared to the soap's wild women. She is so virtuous that she has failed to hear the rustle of bushes and bedsheets as her heartthrob boyfriend Gavin swept into the village and the local lasses off their feet..." In December 2012, Kate White of Inside Soap said she was "thrilled" that Giles had returned to the show, naming Bernice "funny", "ditzy", "well-connected", "selfish", "thoughtless", "hilariously unreliable", "brutal" and "passionate". In 2021, viewers ridiculed Giles and her character due to her wearing a wig onscreen. They felt the wig looked cheap and therefore she "found herself the centre of memes and jokes on the internet and throughout the Emmerdale fandom". The comments led to Giles stopping wearing the wig. That same year, Giles was longlisted for "Funniest Performance" for the Inside Soap Awards for her role as Bernice.
