= 2017 British Soap Awards =

Annual British TV awards ceremony

- Date: 3 June 2017
- Location: The Lowry, Salford
- Country: United Kingdom
- Presented by: Various
- Hosted by: Phillip Schofield
- Most awards: Emmerdale (6)

Television/radio coverage
- Network: ITV; STV
- Runtime: 120 minutes

The 2017 British Soap Awards honoured the best in British soap operas throughout 2016 and 2017. The ceremony was held on 3 June 2017 at the Lowry theatre in Salford Quays, Salford, and was broadcast three days later on ITV and STV. It was originally planned for the event to be broadcast live for the first time, but due to ITV moving the live final of Britain's Got Talent into its scheduled timeslot, the awards were instead pre-recorded. The publicly voted categories were announced on 18 April 2017, with the vote opening that same day. This included a longlist for the Best Actress and Actor awards. The shortlist, including panel nominations, was released on 9 May 2017.

ITV soap Emmerdale won all three of the viewer-voted categories including Best British Soap, as well as taking home the most awards of the night. Fellow ITV soap Coronation Street won four awards, with Channel 4 soap Hollyoaks winning three. Original Hollyoaks cast member Nick Pickard won the British Soap Award for Outstanding Achievement for his role as Tony Hutchinson. BBC soaps Doctors and EastEnders won one award each.

== Winners and nominees ==
=== Publicly voted ===
Award	Winner	Shortlisted (Note: These nominees were voted through to the shortlist round.)	Longlisted (Note: These nominees were unsuccessful in being voted through to the shortlist.)
Best British Soap	Emmerdale	Coronation Street; Doctors; EastEnders; Hollyoaks	—N/a
Best Actor	John Middleton (Ashley Thomas in Emmerdale)	Jack P. Shepherd (David Platt in Coronation Street); Danny Miller (Aaron Dingle in Emmerdale); Gregory Finnegan (James Nightingale in Hollyoaks); Jamie Lomas (Warren Fox in Hollyoaks)	Simon Gregson (Steve McDonald in Coronation Street); William Roache (Ken Barlow in Coronation Street); Owen Brenman (Heston Carter in Doctors); Ashley Rice (Sid Vere in Doctors); Chris Walker (Rob Hollins in Doctors); Danny Dyer (Mick Carter in EastEnders); Davood Ghadami (Kush Kazemi in EastEnders); Scott Maslen (Jack Branning in EastEnders); Matthew Wolfenden (David Metcalfe in Emmerdale); Ben-Ryan Davies (Nick Savage in Hollyoaks)
Best Actress	Charlotte Bellamy (Laurel Thomas in Emmerdale)	Lucy Fallon (Bethany Platt in Coronation Street); Kym Marsh (Michelle Connor in Coronation Street); Lacey Turner (Stacey Fowler in EastEnders); Anna Passey (Sienna Blake in Hollyoaks)	Jane Danson (Leanne Battersby in Coronation Street); Lorna Laidlaw (Mrs Tembe in Doctors); Bharti Patel (Ruhma Hanif in Doctors); Laura Rollins (Ayesha Lee in Doctors); June Brown (Dot Branning in EastEnders); Diane Parish (Denise Fox in EastEnders); Zoë Henry (Rhona Goskirk in Emmerdale); Natalie J. Robb (Moira Dingle in Emmerdale); Rachel Adedeji (Lisa Loveday in Hollyoaks); Jessica Fox (Nancy Osborne in Hollyoaks)

=== Panel voted ===
Award	Winner	Nominees
Best Comedy Performance	Dolly-Rose Campbell (Gemma Winter in Coronation Street)	Elisabeth Dermot Walsh (Zara Carmichael in Doctors); Tameka Empson (Kim Fox-Hubbard in EastEnders); Dominic Brunt (Paddy Kirk in Emmerdale); Nicole Barber-Lane (Myra McQueen in Hollyoaks)
Best Female Dramatic Performance	Kym Marsh (Michelle Connor in Coronation Street)	Dido Miles (Emma Reid in Doctors); Diane Parish (Denise Fox in EastEnders); Charlotte Bellamy (Laurel Thomas in Emmerdale); Nadine Rose Mulkerrin (Cleo McQueen in Hollyoaks)
Best Male Dramatic Performance	John Middleton (Ashley Thomas in Emmerdale)	Simon Gregson (Steve McDonald in Coronation Street); Ian Midlane (Al Haskey in Doctors); Steve McFadden (Phil Mitchell in EastEnders); Kieron Richardson (Ste Hay in Hollyoaks)
Best Newcomer	Rob Mallard (Daniel Osbourne in Coronation Street)	Ritu Arya (Dr. Megan Sharma in Doctors); Zack Morris (Keegan Baker in EastEnders); Sally Dexter (Faith Dingle in Emmerdale); Duncan James (Ryan Knight in Hollyoaks)
Best On-Screen Partnership	Richard Linnell and Kassius Nelson (Alfie Nightingale and Jade Albright in Hollyoaks)	Malcolm Hebden and Patti Clare (Norris Cole and Mary Taylor in Coronation Street); Matthew Chambers and Elisabeth Dermot Walsh (Daniel Granger and Zara Carmichael in Doctors); James Bye and Lacey Turner (Martin and Stacey Fowler in EastEnders); John Middleton and Charlotte Bellamy (Ashley and Laurel Thomas in Emmerdale)
Best Single Episode	"Ashley's Point of View" (Emmerdale)	"Kylie's death" (Coronation Street); "A Christmas Carol" (Doctors); "Lee on the edge" (EastEnders); "What is Consent?" (Hollyoaks)
Best Storyline	Ashley's dementia (Emmerdale)	The grooming of Bethany (Coronation Street); Rhiannon's second chance (Doctors); Lee's mental health (EastEnders); Teenage cancer (Hollyoaks)
Best Young Actor	Elle Mulvaney (Amy Barlow in Coronation Street)	Bleu Landau (Dennis Rickman Jnr in EastEnders); Isobel Steele (Liv Flaherty in Emmerdale); Elà-May Demircan (Leah Barnes in Hollyoaks)
Outstanding Achievement	Nick Pickard (Tony Hutchinson in Hollyoaks)	—N/a
Scene of the Year	Jade says goodbye to Alfie (Hollyoaks)	Michelle's goodbye to Ruairi (Coronation Street); Haunted by his voices (Doctors); Ronnie and Roxy's exit (EastEnders); The Hotten bypass pile-up (Emmerdale)
The Tony Warren Award	Gillian Richmond (EastEnders writer)	—N/a
Villain of the Year	Lucy-Jo Hudson (Rhiannon Davis in Doctors)	Connor McIntyre (Pat Phelan in Coronation Street); Jake Wood (Max Branning in EastEnders); Gillian Kearney (Emma Barton in Emmerdale); Persephone Swales-Dawson (Nico Blake in Hollyoaks)

== Wins by soap ==
Soap opera	Wins
Emmerdale	6
Coronation Street	4
Hollyoaks	3
Doctors	1
EastEnders	1
