= Laurel Thomas =

Fictional character from Emmerdale

- Emmerdale character
- Charlotte Bellamy as Laurel Thomas
- Portrayed by: Charlotte Bellamy; Cal Freestone (2016)
- Duration: 2002–present
- First appearance: Episode 3258; 3 September 2002
- Introduced by: Keith Richardson
In-universe information
- Other names: Laurel Potts; Laurel Dingle; Laurel Thomas; Laurel Sharma
- Occupation: Cleaner; Packer; Factory supervisor; Café waitress
- Father: Douglas Potts
- Mother: Hilary Potts
- Sisters: Caroline Swann
- Husband: Ashley Thomas (2005–2013, 2016–2017); Marlon Dingle (2014–2015); Jai Sharma (2023–2025)
- Sons: Arthur Thomas
- Daughters: Dotty Thomas
- Adoptive sons: Daniel Thomas
- Stepsons: Leo Goskirk; Archie Breckle
- Stepdaughters: Gabby Thomas; April Windsor

Laurel Thomas (also Potts and Dingle) is a fictional character from the British ITV soap opera Emmerdale, played by Charlotte Bellamy. She debuted on screen during the episode airing on 3 September 2002. Laurel has been off-screen at various times while Bellamy has taken maternity leave. Laurel is shown to have a thoughtful and caring attitude towards other characters, however, this changed dramatically in 2015 when she developed an addiction to alcohol which often caused her to become violent and aggressive.

Her storylines have included her first and second marriages to Ashley Thomas (John Middleton), the highly publicised cot death storyline in which Laurel and Ashley's adoptive baby son dies but it transpires that their biological baby is still alive as he was accidentally swapped with another baby at the hospital, mentally unstable Sally Spode (Siân Reeves) trying to murder Laurel on numerous occasions, discovering Ashley's abuse of his elderly widower father Sandy (Freddie Jones), her relationship and marriage to Marlon Dingle (Mark Charnock), being carjacked by Ross Barton (Michael Parr) and becoming obsessed with getting her revenge on him, sliding into alcoholism when she begins to struggle with life, a reunion with Ashley, coping with Ashley's vascular dementia, going into premature labour which resulted in the birth of her and Ashley's daughter, Dotty, coming to terms with Ashley's death, her friendship with fellow widow Emma Barton (Gillian Kearney), which later turns bitter when she becomes obsessed with proving that Emma murdered her husband, James (Bill Ward); an affair with Bob Hope (Tony Audenshaw), her marriage to Jai Sharma and deciding to terminate their pregnancy after discovering that the baby has Down syndrome.

== Casting ==
In 2004, Bellamy announced she was pregnant with her first child. Laurel was briefly written out while she took maternity leave. Bellamy did not have to hide her pregnancy while filming. In 2006, Bellamy announced her second pregnancy and took maternity leave in 2007. Her pregnancy was written into Laurel's storylines. In 2009, Bellamy announced her final pregnancy to date, which saw Laurel written out of the serial again for a number of months. On an episode which aired on 20 December 2016 she was temporarily recast in an episode from the viewpoint of dementia patient Ashley Thomas (John Middleton).

== Development ==
=== Characterisation ===
Lovely Laurel is not your typical vicar's wife but is very supportive of her husband Ashley. She's well known in the village for her quirky fashion sense. She's very determined and even though a lot of bad things have happened to her she still remains a happy, positive woman who enjoys hanging out with her mates, especially Nicola.

— itv.com on Laurel.

Bellamy said Laurel is not your "typical vicar's wife" because she acts "a bit daft and scatty". Bellamy said the best thing about Laurel is her drunken scenes. As Laurel is married to a vicar, she has to always be seen to act "nice, sweet and kind". There are no limits to Laurel when she drinks and "she really lets her hair down." Laurel's best friend is Nicola Blackstock (Nicola Wheeler). Bellamy said she is "a bit horrible to her" but Laurel really loves her.

While interviewed by the Sunday Mail, Bellamy said Laurel's likeability is her "kind-hearted and unassuming" persona. However, Laurel is not afraid to speak her mind but would never "intentionally hurt someone". Laurel is often the serial's source for light comic relief. Bellamy opined that it played an important role in Emmerdale's success. Laurel has many different elements. She is funny and makes people laugh. Having an "emotional soul" means she has the capacity to be very loving. These personality traits have made the role enjoyable for Bellamy to portray. Bellamy later said "Laurel's a simple soul with a good heart and she deserves to be really happy."

=== Relationship with Ashley Thomas ===
"They are the mismatched couple who have raised many of Emmerdale's laughs as viewers have followed their rocky road to romance."

— Laura Davidson of the Sunday Mail on Laurel and Ashley. (2008)

Laurel's first relationship develops when she falls in love with Ashley Thomas (John Middleton). He is initially oblivious to her feelings, though later develops feelings for her too. When Ashley proposes to Laurel, she tells him to wait until she returns from volunteer work in Tanzania. Bellamy said it proved Laurel had progressed into "her own woman" and became more confident. She hoped Laurel would marry Ashley because it has been "all she's ever wanted in life." She added that Laurel deserved a happy ending, but highlighted the fact nothing is ever straightforward in Laurel's life. Middleton said that Laurel and Ashley are well suited to one another, branding her as Ashley's soul mate.

Upon Laurel's return, scriptwriters decided to complicate the storyline by introducing obstacles in their pursuit of marriage. One of these was using curate Ethan Blake (Liam O'Brien) to attempt to ruin their relationship. The next was the funeral of Laurel's surrogate grandfather Seth Armstrong (Stan Richards). Though Laurel decides to "live life to the full" and marry Ashley. Instead of having her own wedding dress, she wears a dress belonging to Betty Eagleton (Paula Tilbrook). Like Seth, Betty has been written and portrayed as a grandparent figure for Laurel. Bellamy said it was probably for the best because Laurel is "not exactly understated in her dress sense." She also said she was glad to see her character get the happy ending due to the many "ups and downs" she has been forced to endure. Bellamy opined that Laurel would want children next and called her a good potential mother figure.

The serial later began scripting marital problems for the pair. Laurel helps Ashley's niece Jasmine Thomas (Jenna-Louise Coleman) with her sexuality issues. Laurel agrees to keep it a secret from Ashley. Coleman said Laurel acts like a mother figure for Jasmine. Jasmine later has an affair with Cain Dingle (Jeff Hordley) and Laurel hides this from Ashley too. Ashley is furious with Laurel when he learns the truth, Middleton predicted it would have a bad effect on their marriage. He said "Ashley really does love Laurel, although he feels really let down by her at the moment."

In late 2006, Laurel discovers that she is pregnant. Bellamy was not required to wear any padding to make the pregnancy appear legitimate, as she was pregnant in real life. Bellamy said it was a surprise that they both fell pregnant at the same time and "you couldn't make it up". Laurel was temporarily written out of the serial while Bellamy took her maternity leave. When Bellamy returned to filming she had lost her baby weight. She said it was strange to then have to wear "a massive fake bump" and be pregnant again. Upon Laurel's return she gives birth. Middleton told the Daily Record that the birth is typical "Laurel and Ashley - it's absolute chaos". After becoming stranded at the church she arrives to a maternity ward that is over capacity. Bellamy added "It wouldn't have been believable if Laurel had just given birth normally. Nothing normal happens to her - she's a bit off the wall." Middleton that the scenes were enjoyable to film and a midwife was on hand to make the scenes realistic. Laurel gives birth to a boy, Daniel, Middleton said they were "thrilled" to have a child of their own together.

== Storylines ==
Laurel arrives at Marlon Dingle (Mark Charnock) and Tricia Stokes's (Sheree Murphy) engagement party, dressed as a bumblebee. but she collapses halfway through her act and is rushed to hospital. Laurel moves in with pensioners Betty Eagleton (Paula Tilbrook) and Seth Armstrong (Stan Richards). Laurel later develops feelings for Ashley Thomas (John Middleton). Though Ashley likes Laurel, he does not feel the same about her. Laurel starts a career in cleaning and manages to secure many village residents on her books. She becomes best friends with Nicola Blackstock (Nicola Wheeler), the aunt of Ashley's daughter Gabby Thomas. Nicola also becomes her business partner. Ashley and Louise Appleton (Emily Symons) are involved in a car accident following a storm. Laurel decides to look after Ashley while he recovers. The pair become close and Ashley develops feelings for her and they start dating. Laurel decides to carry out volunteer work in Tanzania. Ashley fails to stop her with a proposal of marriage. When Laurel returns, she agrees to marry Ashley. They face problems when Bishop George Postlethwaite (Peter Cartwright), refuses them permission to marry. He makes it clear Ashley's love life has put his position in question. Ashley quits his job but realizes he cannot cope without the church. Laurel tells Ashley that she will wait to marry him. Curate Ethan becomes Laurel's confidant but falls in love with her. He makes advances on Laurel but she does not reciprocate and lets him down gently but Ethan tells George that they had kissed. When George discovers Ethan lied, he gives Laurel and Ashley his blessing and carries out their wedding ceremony.

Laurel helps Ashley reconnect with his widower elderly father Sandy Thomas (Freddie Jones). When Nicola leaves the village, she struggles with the workload and her new parish duties. She sells her business to David Metcalfe (Matthew Wolfenden) but clashes with Ashley's niece, Jasmine Thomas (Jenna-Louise Coleman). They eventually bond after a difficult start. However, Laurel is upset when Jasmine's friends, Debbie Dingle (Charley Webb) and Daz Eden (Luke Tittensor), accidentally set fire to the vicarage, seeing her lose everything.

Laurel later discovers that she is pregnant. Laurel's parents, Douglas (Duncan Preston) and Hilary Potts (Paula Wilcox), visit her but are involved in a car accident on the way home. Laurel decides to look after them. Upon her return, she goes into labour whilst locked in the church, with only Shadrach Dingle (Andy Devine) for help. Shadrach rings the church bell to attract attention. When she gives birth to a boy named Daniel in hospital, she meets Melanie Doland (Caroline Strong), who also has a baby boy. Laurel finds Daniel dead in his cot. Laurel is distraught and lashes out at those closest to her. She stays with Betty so she doesn't have to see Ashley and later kisses Greg. Ashamed, she goes home but Hilary begins suspecting that Arthur Doland is Laurel's son and sets out to prove there was a mix up at the hospital. Laurel feels like she is betraying Daniel and refuses to believe it. Ashley goes for custody when Arthur is proved to be their son but Mel runs away with Arthur briefly, but returns him. Ashley tells Laurel that he will raise Arthur alone if she does not attend the custody hearing. When they win, she finds it hard to bond with the child and her marriage suffers as a result. Laurel fears he will die when he suffers a cold and takes him to hospital and realizes that she has to accept that she is his mother.

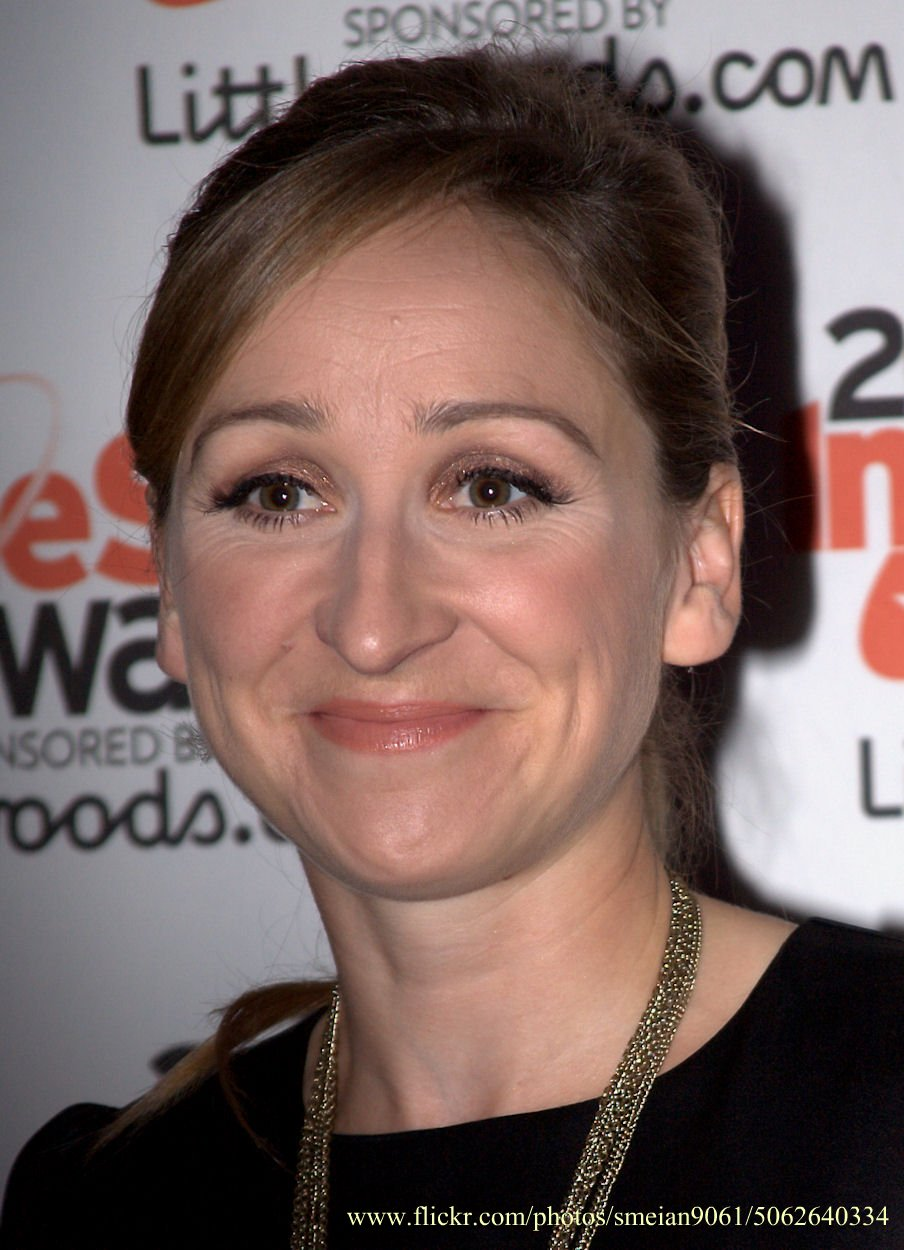
Charlotte Bellamy (pictured) believes that Laurel's likeability is her "kind-hearted and unassuming" persona.

George announces that the church faces closure, due to low attendance. Laurel and Nicola try to save the church by holding charity events but David reveals that Nicola knew about the plan to buy the church, which ends the friendship, though they later make peace. Laurel barricades herself in the church to stop its closure. However, Natasha Wylde (Amanda Donohoe) reveals she has bought it and donates it to the community, allowing Laurel and Ashley to stay in the village. Jasmine admits to murdering Shane Doyle (Paul McEwan), Laurel tries to get her to confess as it was self-defence. However, Jasmine goes on the run, with Debbie left taking the blame. Laurel goes to the police to make a statement about Jasmine, however they charge her with perverting the course of justice. She is later given forty hours of community service. Ashley comes back into contact with old enemy Vincent (Antony Byrne) and Sally Spode (Siân Reeves). Sally starts visiting them more claiming to need support. Laurel makes an effort as she previously dated Ashley. Though Sally leaves Vincent and moves into the vicarage. Laurel tries to get her to go home and Sally causes trouble for Laurel. Vincent becomes angry with Sally for leaving, who pretends to be victimised. Laurel later grows tired of Sally's reluctance to find somewhere else to live. Laurel becomes angry with Sally for attempting to take over her role in her domestic life.

Sally locks Laurel in the church having started a fire. Sally pretends to be concerned and alerts villagers. Laurel survives and realises Sally could be behind the fire and tries to stop Sally from looking after her children. Sally later tries to suffocate Laurel. Laurel informs Ashley that she suspects Sally was behind the fire, though he refuses to believe her and calls her a councillor. Laurel leaves Ashley for not believing her and takes the children to live with Hilary. Sally is delighted to have Ashley to herself, though after a while he realises Laurel was telling the truth. When Laurel returns she agrees to move back in their home. Though, she makes it clear their marriage will take time to repair. Laurel tracks Sally down to a block of flats. She finds a shrine of Ashley inside and Sally claims to be pregnant with his child. Laurel attacks Sally and dangles her over the flat balcony. Laurel sees sense and pulls her back over, which results in Sally being arrested. Laurel refuses to go on strike over Nikhil Sharma (Rik Makarem) while all the other factory girls do. She is later annoyed to find out Charity Tate (Emma Atkins) set Nikhil up. Laurel becomes annoyed with the atmosphere between Ashley and Sandy. She spends more time out the house and with Marlon. They share an emotional moment, though when Marlon becomes close to Rachel Breckle (Gemma Oaten), Laurel becomes jealous and realises she has feelings for Marlon.

Laurel later divorces Ashley and begins a relationship with Marlon, who proposes to her in 2013. When out in town with Rhona Goskirk (Zoe Henry), who is busy looking for painkillers to feed her addiction, Laurel is violently carjacked by Ross Barton (Michael Parr), which leads to Laurel becoming very paranoid and too frightened to leave the house. She becomes obsessed with trying to find her attacker, and when she does, she threatens him with a pair of scissors. Ross attacks her in self-defence, but Marlon arrives before any real damage is done. She is mortified when Ross moves to the village and is revealed to be a relative of Moira Barton's (Natalie J. Robb). She attempts to frame him in order to send him to jail, but Moira calls the police and Laurel is arrested but released without charge. Laurel later feels uncomfortable in early 2014 when Marlon's ex-wife Donna Windsor (Verity Rushworth) returns to the village with his secret four-year-old daughter April (Amelia Flanagan). She is later very sympathetic towards Donna when she discovers that she is dying from terminal mesothelioma, and agrees to act as a mother figure to April after Donna dies. Laurel is concerned by how worried Marlon is by Donna's shocking illness, which leads to many arguments and Laurel moving in with Rhona and Paddy Kirk (Dominic Brunt), but they later reconcile. Donna eventually commits suicide by throwing herself from a multi-storey car park when doing illegal dealings with Ross, and Laurel later discovers that Marlon kissed Donna before she died. Laurel also admits that she drunkenly kissed Ashley when she was drowning her sorrows, and the pair forgive one another. Laurel and Marlon marry in September 2014.

Towards the end of 2014, Laurel slowly descends into alcoholism after she realises she cannot cope with everything that has happened to her, Marlon and Donna over the recent months. She manages to keep her addiction secret for a number of months, however, her father Doug eventually uncovers it, leading to Laurel throwing Doug out of the family home. She also makes a fool out of herself by drunkenly falling down the stairs while attending Kerry Wyatt's (Laura Norton) party. Marlon eventually discovers the extent of his wife's addiction, but Laurel lies and says that she has only begun drinking because she cannot cope with looking after the children all of the time and she will stop drinking once she and Marlon take a short holiday away from the village. When they return, it becomes apparent that Laurel has not stopped drinking, and continues to drink alcoholic drinks when Marlon is at work. At breakfast, she spikes her orange juice with vodka, which April drinks. Laurel takes April to hospital, where they are told that April will be fine, but Laurel manipulates her into not telling Marlon about the incident. A number of weeks later, Laurel drinks alcoholic beverages while looking after April and Arthur, and viciously shouts at April when she asks Laurel to help her with her homework. Laurel then passes out of the sofa and begins to choke on her own vomit, however, April phones for an ambulance and Marlon realises that Laurel has not stopped drinking. While Laurel is in hospital recovering, April reveals to Marlon about the orange juice incident, which infuriates him; things turn from bad to worse when Jai dismisses Laurel from her job at the factory, as he does not want an alcoholic working for him. When Laurel is discharged the following week, Marlon confronts her and he gives her some harsh home truths, leading to Laurel punching Marlon in the face. He appears to be fine, but the next day he collapses and claims that he cannot see. He is taken to hospital and told that Laurel has detached his retina in his eye when she punched him. Marlon's concerned relative Cain Dingle (Jeff Hordley) orders for Laurel to leave Marlon and the children, but she refuses and gets drunk yet again. She leaves the house, unaware that she has left the front door open, leading to Marlon's beloved dog Daisy escaping. When Marlon is discharged from hospital following an operation on his eye, he is furious to discover that Cain has told Laurel to leave and they go and find her. They discover Laurel's car crashed into a tree and her pleading with Marlon not to come any closer. It is then revealed that Laurel has run over and killed Daisy. This leads to Marlon throwing Laurel out of the family home and him filing for legal separation.

Desperate for a drink, Laurel leaves the village after Chas Dingle (Lucy Pargeter) and Diane Sugden (Elizabeth Estensen) refuse to serve her alcohol in The Woolpack. She finds a bar in town and flirts with a man in order to get free alcoholic drinks. She later has sex with the man, and initially regrets it the following day. She then returns to the village, and admits to Doug that she has a serious addiction and decides to have counselling. Laurel moves in with her ex-husband, Ashley, and his girlfriend Harriet Finch (Katherine Dow Blyton), which Harriet finds uncomfortable. Laurel later takes on a role at the salon, as a brands ambassador. She takes a sexually transmitted infection test, which shows that Laurel has contracted chlamydia from the man she slept with. Later that day, Ashley is run over by Victoria Sugden (Isabel Hodgins) while chasing after Laurel when Marlon shouts at her over her chlamydia. He is comatised, and Harriet believes that Laurel caused his accident after what she did to Marlon. When a drunken Laurel states that Ashley was chasing after her when he was hit by the car, Harriet slaps her and orders her to leave the hospital. When she later spies Sandy crying to Edna Birch (Shirley Stelfox), Laurel believes that Ashley has died due to Sandy's extreme upset. She storms over to the pub and attacks Victoria, with a distraught Gabby overhearing Laurel announcing Ashley's "death". When she returns to the hospital, she is very sympathetic towards Harriet before she reveals her actions. Harriet and Marlon are infuriated by Laurel's thoughtless mistake, and she is subsequently hated by the other villagers. Laurel and Marlon eventually decide to split up after many failed attempts to repair their marriage. However, Laurel is informed that her mother, Hilary, has died from heart failure. Laurel later becomes a marketing assistant for Kirin Kotecha (Adam Fielding) and Belle Dingle's (Eden Taylor-Draper) new product, Belle's grandmother's cordial.

She later tells Nicola that she still has feelings for Ashley and after discovering he has dementia, they reunite. When alcohol is found in the house, Ashley suspects it belongs to Laurel, however, it turns out to be Gabby's. Laurel later breaks the news to Ashley that she didn't miscarry and is still pregnant, but they decide to keep it quiet. When Ashley is about to tell the news to her dad, Laurel says they are getting married. Meanwhile, Laurel and Ashley deal with Gabby's behaviour and they feel she is spoilt by Bernice and her stepfather, Lawrence White (John Bowe) and they work things out after disputing about their parenting. At Laurel's hen do, it comes out that she is pregnant and she falls out with her dad when he fails to make an original speech for her wedding, but they soon make up. Laurel and Ashley get married, but when they return home, Ashley forgets that he married Laurel, still believing he is with Harriet. Laurel takes Ashley to hospital and she becomes emotional when Ashley can't remember they got married. Ashley builds a pirate ship playhouse for Arthur, but Arthur cuts himself with a saw and Ashley takes him to hospital. Ashley forgets Arthur and ends up with Laurel at their baby scan and Arthur is brought home by the police. Social services visit and tell them that Ashley cannot be left unsupervised with Arthur. Laurel arranges for family and friends to stay with Ashley and he is hurt when he finds out the truth why people are staying with him. Ashley makes a meal for Laurel and he pours her alcohol, which Laurel drinks when Ashley keeps calling her Harriet and after speaking to Marlon, she decides to end her marriage. They reconcile when Douglas gets them together at the church and they say new vows to each other, recorded by Douglas. Laurel catches Gabby in a compromising position with Jacob Gallagher (Joe Warren-Plant) and finds an unused condom. She physically throws Jacob out and when both Gabby and Jacob's parents get together to discuss the situation, Gabby shows them the bruises on his arms.

Rishi discusses maternity leave with Laurel, who wants to stay at work for as long as she can. Ashley prepares a picnic and music for Laurel. Laurel gets twinges at the factory and Rishi takes her to hospital, but she is told it's a false alarm. Laurel later goes into labour and their baby is delivered by Ashley. They name her Dotty Thomas after Ashley's mother. After Ashley's health deteriorates he is put into a care home and forgets who Laurel is. This causes Gabby to go on a downward spiral as well as Laurel who kisses Marlon. Laurel struggles to cope and after finding out Gabby has had unprotected sex she lashes out and slaps her. They eventually make up. Later on, Ashley is admitted to hospital. He is diagnosed with pneumonia and Laurel is distraught when she finds that Ashley only has days to live. She brings him back home. On 7 April 2017, Ashley wakes up and recognises Laurel, who is overjoyed. However, she is devastated when she finds Ashley dead a minute later.

== Reception ==
Laura Davidson of the Sunday Mail described Laurel as one of Emmerdale's most popular characters, citing "dippy and loveable Laurel" as a firm favourite. She opined Laurel remained true to her "unpredictable" nature when she left Ashley without an answer to his proposal. Though said "teary-eyed viewers" thought she would have said yes "faster than you can say 'white wedding'." Davidson later opined that the "dippy cleaner makes a truly beautiful bride." She added that an army of fans cheered when the "scatterbrain character finally tied the knot with her dream man." Jane Simon of the Daily Mirror said Emmerdale had some "fabulously random pairings" and such as the "unlikely" love-triangle with Laurel, Kelly and Ethan could be titled "The Cleaning Lady, the Scrubber and the Dirty Little Liar."

Dek Hogan writing for Digital Spy said Emmerdale had done a good job tackling the issue of cot death. He noted that while Laurel has often been used for comic relief, Bellamy proved to be outstanding in the "moving storyline". He also branded the episode as a "tear-jerker". In August 2017, Bellamy was longlisted for Best Actress at the Inside Soap Awards, while she and Middleton were longlisted for Best Partnership. Both nominations made the viewer-voted shortlist, although Bellamy did not win any awards.
