= James Carleton =

James Carleton may refer to:

- James Henry Carleton (1814–1873), American military officer
- James P. Carleton (1812–1853), American politician, member and speaker of the Iowa Territorial House of Representatives
- James Carleton (field hockey) (born 2005), English field hockey player

== See also ==
- James Carleton Paget (born 1966), British biblical scholar
- J. Carleton Bell (James Carleton Bell; 1872–1946), American educational psychologist and professor
- James Carlton (disambiguation), multiple people
