= Jason Kirk =

Fictional character from Emmerdale

- Emmerdale character
- Portrayed by: James Carlton
- Duration: 1999–2002
- First appearance: 2 December 1999
- Last appearance: 20 December 2002
- Introduced by: Kieran Roberts
In-universe information
- Occupation: Construction worker
- Father: Bill Kirk
- Mother: Vi Kirk
- Half-brothers: Ross Kirk
- Uncles: Kenneth Kirk
- First cousins: Paddy Kirk (adoptive); Colin Kirk

Jason Kirk is a fictional character from the British television soap opera Emmerdale, played by James Carlton. He made his first screen appearance during the episode broadcast on 2 December 1999.

== Development ==
Jason was the first openly homosexual man to appear in Emmerdale. In one of his first stories, Jason kisses Gavin Ferris (Robert Beck), the boyfriend of Bernice Blackstock (Samantha Giles). The scene looked intimate but off-screen camera trickery was used during filming. Carlton told Patrick Baladi from the Daily Mirror that their lips did not touch and "the camera only made it look as though we had." Carlton did not want Jason to be defined by his sexuality. He told Baladi that "I was determined to play Jason as a man who just happened to be gay. And I never received a single hostile comment. People are more intelligent than that."

In another storyline, Tricia Stokes (Sheree Murphy) develops an attraction to Jason, who fails to disclose his sexuality. When Tricia discovers the truth, she is upset that he deceived her. Murphy told a reporter from Inside Soap that "she's completely gutted, she thinks it was totally out of order for him to lead her on."

In a 2005 interview featured in The Argus, Carlton stated that "I'm still well liked by the gay community, there have been lots of other characters I've enjoyed playing but the response to Jason was amazing." In 2010, Carlton told Laura-Jayne Tyler of Inside Soap "I played the first gay man in Emmerdale – and there weren't many of them in the soaps back then. I didn't realise how important it was at the time, but it really hit home when I started getting letters from people saying thank you." Tyler stated that Jason became popular with viewers during his time in the soap due to his affair with Bernice's boyfriend, Gavin.

Jason was written out of the series in February 2002. His departure storyline featured Jason moving to Leeds to begin a new life. He was supposed to leave with Latisha Daggert (Danielle Henry), but leaves her behind upon discovering she loves Cain Dingle (Jeff Hordley). Carlton reprised the role for one episode which was broadcast on 20 December 2002. The episode featured Jason arriving to convince Latisha to move to Lisbon with him. In 2005, Carlton confirmed that he did not want to reprise the role and no longer wanted to act in soap operas.

== Storylines ==
Jason first appears in 1999 on his cousin Paddy's doorstep after his parents throw him out after he had told them he was gay. Paddy tells Jason to keep his sexuality a secret as he suspects that his then-in-laws, the Dingles, will not take it well. Jason shares an impromptu kiss with Gavin, who is engaged to Bernice. Jason falls for one of his many one night stands, Joe. As there's no marriage option for them at the time (2000) and Joe's visa is about to expire they ask Tricia to marry Joe. Jason helps deliver Latisha's baby, and Latisha names the baby boy Kirk Daggert (Alexander Fothergil) as a thank you to Jason. Jason leaves for Leeds on 31 January 2002, but he comes back briefly that December to offer Latisha and her family jobs in Portugal where he has decided to emigrate to. Latisha, her mother Cynthia and Kirk move to Portugal with Jason.

== Reception ==
Ian Wylie from the Manchester Evening News branded the character "soap odd job man Jason". Sally Brockway from The People called him a "randy barman". A reporter from The Argus branded him a "good guy".
