= Ashley Thomas =

Fictional character from Emmerdale

- Emmerdale character
- Portrayed by: John Middleton
- Duration: 1996–2018
- First appearance: Episode 2139; 5 December 1996
- Last appearance: Episode 8069; 13 February 2018
- Introduced by: Mervyn Watson
In-universe information
- Other names: Ashley Michael Thomas
- Occupation: Vicar (1985–2012); Curate (2014–2016)
- Father: Sandy Thomas
- Mother: Dorothy Thomas
- Brothers: Luke Thomas
- Wife: Bernice Blackstock (2000–2002); Laurel Potts (2005–2013, 2016–2017)
- Sons: Arthur Thomas
- Daughters: Gabby Thomas; Dotty Thomas
- Adoptive sons: Daniel Thomas
- Grandsons: Thomas Tate
- Grandfathers: Sir Michael Thomas
- Nieces: Jasmine Thomas

Ashley Thomas is a fictional character from the British soap opera Emmerdale, played by John Middleton. He made his first screen appearance during the episode broadcast on 5 December 1996. It was announced on 22 October 2015 that Middleton would be departing as Ashley at the end of his contract after the character was diagnosed with vascular dementia in the episode aired on that day. The contract was later extended in order for the storyline to be extended. It was revealed that Ashley would be killed off at the end of the storyline. Middleton filmed his final scenes in March 2017 after his contract ended, and Ashley died on-screen on 7 April 2017, ending his 21 years on Emmerdale. Ashley appeared in further episodes in home movie scenes, making his final appearance on 13 February 2018.

Ashley's storylines have included his short-lived marriage to Bernice Blackstock (Samantha Giles) and the birth of their daughter Gabby, as well as his first and second marriages to Laurel Thomas (Charlotte Bellamy) and the birth of their son Arthur, as part of a highly publicised cot death storyline in which Laurel and Ashley's adoptive baby son dies. It later transpires that their biological child is still alive as the babies were accidentally swapped at birth. Other storylines have included abusing his elderly widower father Sandy (Freddie Jones), held hostage by Declan Macey (Jason Merrells), being accidentally run over by Victoria Sugden (Isabel Hodgins) which results in his epilepsy, and being diagnosed with dementia. Ashley was involved in the October 2016 week of episodes "No Return Week", which led to the death of James Barton (Bill Ward). In November 2016, it was announced that Emmerdale would air a special episode featuring Ashley's point of view to "give people an insight into how ordinary, day-to-day experiences can become disorientating and distressing when refracted through the lens of dementia." The episode aired on 20 December 2016.

== Development ==
=== Relationship with Bernice Blackstock ===
Ashley begins a relationship with Bernice Blackstock (Samantha Giles). Ashley falls in love with Bernice but does not have the courage to tell her. He finds himself in a "right state" when he shares a tent with Bernice during a camping trip. As Middleton told Claire Brand from Inside Soap, Ashley could not handle scenarios involving females and now "he has to spend time with this woman who he clearly adores". While Ashley worries about the arrangement, Bernice remains "ignorant" to his feelings. The actor thought that Bernice had never contemplated a relationship with Ashley. He added that even "Ashley doesn't think Bernice would give him a second look even if he did tell her how he feels." The storyline had gained momentum off-screen as viewers had written to Middleton demanding a relationship between the two characters. While Inside Soap ran a poll which determined that readers wanted Bernice to leave Gavin Ferris (Robert Beck) in favour of Ashley. When the bishop learns of their romance he offers Ashley a job in Leeds, but Bernice does not like the idea. Giles told a writer from Inside Soap that her character is reluctant to leave the village because "for once in her life, she has got some stability and she doesn't want to change that." Ashley tries to persuade Bernice to move by taking her to visit his potential work place; but Bernice is not impressed. Giles explained that Bernice dislikes it and she feels depressed. While she accepts Ashley's beliefs, his relationship with God creates problems during decision making. The actress added that Bernice "naively thought that if they got engaged – their problems would be solved."

=== Relationship with Laurel Potts ===
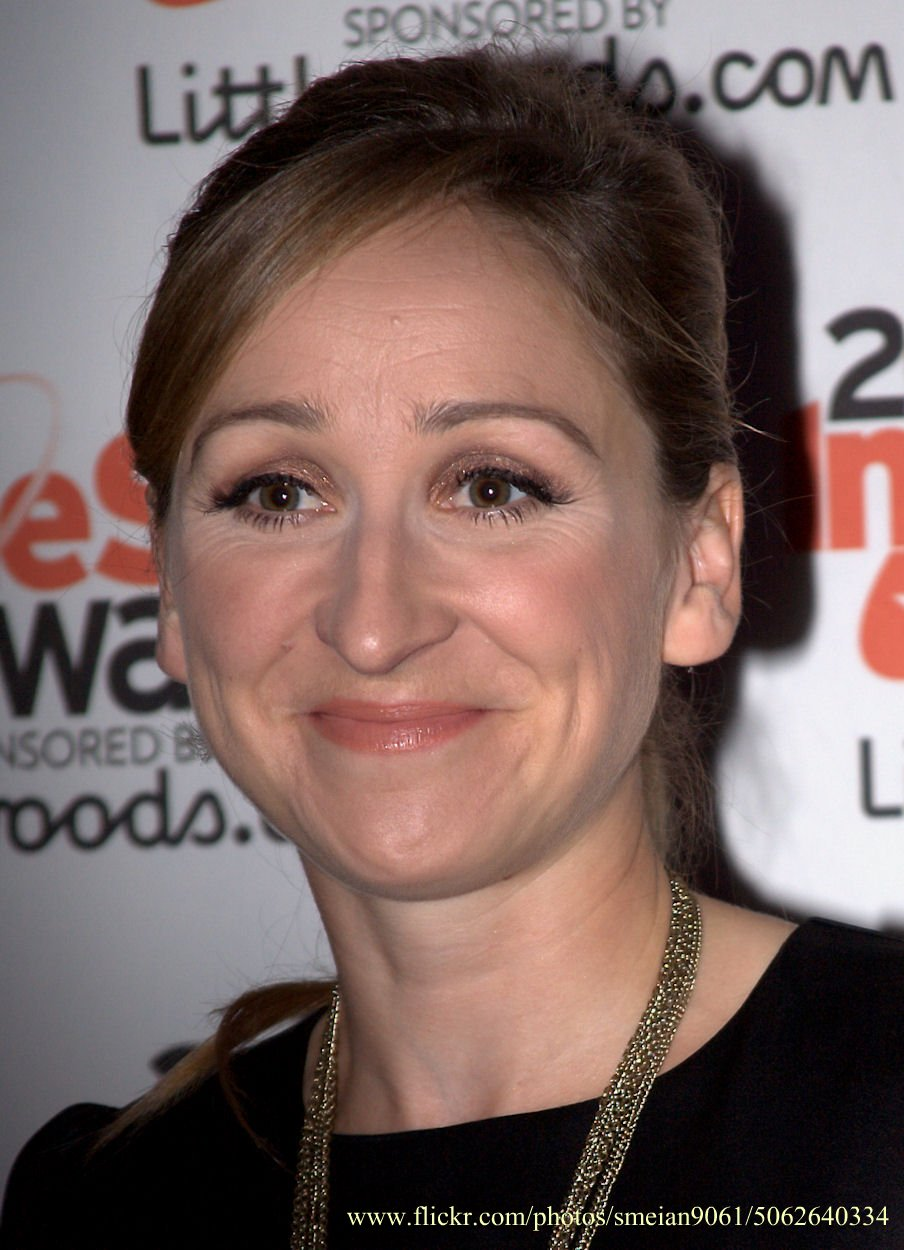
Ashley began a relationship and later went on to marry Laurel Potts, played by Charlotte Bellamy (pictured).

Ashley began a relationship with Laurel Potts (Charlotte Bellamy). When Ashley proposes to Laurel, she tells him to wait until she returns from volunteer work in Tanzania. Bellamy said it proved Laurel had progressed into "her own woman" and became more confident. She hoped Laurel would marry Ashley because it has been "all she's ever wanted in life." She added that Laurel deserved a happy ending, but highlighted the fact nothing is ever straightforward in Laurel's life. Middleton said that Laurel and Ashley are well suited to one another, branding her as Ashley's soul mate.

The serial later began scripting marital problems for the pair. Laurel helps Ashley's niece Jasmine Thomas (Jenna-Louise Coleman) with her sexuality issues. Laurel agrees to keep it a secret from Ashley. Coleman said Laurel acts like a mother figure for Jasmine. Jasmine later has an affair with Cain Dingle (Jeff Hordley) and Laurel hides this from Ashley too. Ashley is furious with Laurel when he learns the truth, Middleton predicted it would have a bad effect on their marriage. He said "Ashley really does love Laurel, although he feels really let down by her at the moment."

Upon Laurel's return she gives birth. Middleton told the Daily Record that the birth is typical "Laurel and Ashley – it's absolute chaos". After becoming stranded at the church she arrives to a maternity ward that is over capacity. Bellamy added "It wouldn't have been believable if Laurel had just given birth normally. Nothing normal happens to her – she's a bit off the wall." Middleton that the scenes were enjoyable to film and a midwife was on hand to make the scenes realistic. Laurel gives birth to a boy, Daniel, Middleton said they were "thrilled" to have a child of their own together.

=== Dementia and departure ===
Emmerdale aired a special flashback episode on 22 October 2015 which revealed Ashley's whereabouts four weeks earlier. It was revealed he was at a doctor's appointment where he was told he is showing early signs of dementia. After the airing of the episode, it was announced Middleton had left his role after twenty years of playing Ashley. Middleton has reportedly chosen to leave on "a high" after being handed the "best storyline of his career", comparing it to a footballer's career in the sense they leave after a good season. Middleton revealed that he had spoken with show boss, Kate Oates, earlier this year about his exit. He also mentioned that his contract does not end until the end of 2016, meaning his exit would air in early 2017. Speaking of his decision to leave, Middleton said it was and wasn't hard to leave the soap, "It's another roll of the dice. I'm very, very excited about that and I couldn't ask for a better storyline to leave the show on, I really couldn't." Middleton continued to mention how he has thought about leaving every year as well as recalling the meeting he had with Oates prior to choosing to leave: "She basically pitched the idea to me. She asked me, 'Are you happy to do this story? You probably want to think about it. I said immediately 'No I don't need time, I recognise this for what it is.'" Oates spoke of Middleton's exit, "I think this is going to be a really challenging story for us to tell. John and I have been talking about it for many, many months. We have heaped more agony on Ashley, but it's because John is an awesome actor and will do the storyline amazing justice." On 14 March 2017, it was confirmed that Middleton had recently filmed Ashley's departure scenes.

== Storylines ==
Ashley becomes the new vicar of St. Mary's Church in Emmerdale arriving as the officiant of weddings, funerals, and other church services after Reverend Burns is transferred to Manchester, and he is thrown straight into a confrontation with the Dingle family over a carol singing scam.

Ashley becomes attracted to barmaid Bernice Blackstock (Samantha Giles), but she is not impressed by his job. Ashley's feelings for Bernice grow and when she breaks up with her ex-fiancé, he eventually tells her how he feels. They begin dating and when they receive Bishop George Postlethwaite's (Peter Cartwright) blessing, they get married. Bernice discovers she is pregnant but miscarries. Ashley and Bernice's marriage suffers when he leaves the village briefly. Bernice has an affair with Carlos Diaz (Gary Turner) and discovers she is pregnant again. However, Bernice tells her sister, Nicola, that Carlos could be the father of her baby after Nicola admits that she is not pregnant on her hen night, despite having told Carlos that she is. Disgusted by Carlos and Bernice's lies, she tells everyone about their affair and dumps Carlos. Ashley also throws Bernice out and they only start to reconcile after the baby is born, a girl who she names Gabrielle (Annelise Manojlovic). A paternity test reveals Ashley is Gabby's father but Bernice sinks into post-natal depression and eventually admits to Ashley that she does not love him anymore and she leaves the village, as Bernice's divorce from Ashley is finalized off-screen in 2002.

Ashley dates Louise Appleton (Emily Symons) for a while and they enjoy each other's company but are not in love and, after crashing in a road accident, they part amicably. Ashley realises Laurel Potts (Charlotte Bellamy) has fallen for him, but initially rebuffs her. When Ashley learns Laurel is leaving the village, he declares his feelings for her. They start a relationship and as Laurel prepares to leave for Tanzania, Ashley proposes. However, Bishop George disapproves and Ashley briefly leaves the church, while he and Laurel try to convince George of their love. Ashley's curate, Ethan Blake (Liam O'Brien), falls for Laurel and when she lets him down, he tells George that her and Ashley's relationship is rocky. He is later exposed and George gives the couple his blessing and marries them. Ashley is horrified to find his widower elderly father, Sandy (Freddie Jones), is in the village and reveals that they fell out because Sandy helped Ashley's & Luke's mother and his wife Dorothy to die. Ashley reconciles with his father and he moves in. Ashley's niece Jasmine (Jenna-Louise Coleman) also comes to stay.

Laurel falls pregnant, delighting her and Ashley. While telling Shadrach Dingle (Andy Devine) off for drinking communion wine, Laurel realizes that she is in labour. Shadrach finds the church door is locked and rings the bells to get help. Laurel gets to hospital and has a baby boy that they name Daniel (Rachel Moonie). In February 2008, Laurel finds Daniel dead in his cot. Ashley and Laurel are devastated and Laurel moves out briefly, due to her grief. Hilary Potts (Paula Wilcox), Laurel's mother, suspects that Arthur Doland (Alfie Clarke) is actually Ashley and Laurel's biological son. Arthur's parents Greg (Shaun Prendergast) and Melanie Doland (Caroline Strong) worry that they might lose their son and try to emigrate but Ashley and Shadrach stop them. A DNA test confirms Ashley and Laurel are Arthur's biological parents and Ashley successfully fights for custody. Laurel initially struggles to accept Arthur is her son but later bonds with him.

Bishop George visits Ashley and reveals the Church Council are considering closing the church. Eric Pollard (Chris Chittell) makes a bid for the church, but after a sit-in protest, Eric withdraws his offer. Bishop George warns Ashley that it is only a matter of time before the church is sold and Ashley gets used to the idea of moving to a different parish. However, Mark (Maxwell Caulfield) and Natasha Wylde (Amanda Donohoe) announce they have purchased the church and return it to the community, with Ashley and Laurel paying rent.

Ashley is asked to captain a local cricket team against his rival, Reverend Vincent Spode (Antony Byrne). Ashley reveals that he hates Vincent for stealing his ideas for a thesis at university and his girlfriend, Sally Spode (Siân Reeves), to whom Vincent is now married. Sally later turns up at the vicarage with her bags, having left Vincent. Ashley allows her to stay but when Vincent learns where Sally is, he hits Ashley, who starts to believe he has also been bullying Sally. Bishop George insists Sally and Vincent go for counselling, but Sally returns with a black eye and Ashley allows her to stay, despite Laurel's unhappiness. A fire is started in the church and Laurel is trapped but is rescued by Ashley and Zak Dingle (Steve Halliwell). Laurel becomes convinced Sally started the fire and when Ashley refuses to believe her, she and the children leave. Eventually Ashley realises that he wants his family back. However, Sally reveals that she and Ashley are having an affair. Ashley denies it but he is suspended from the church and Sally later accuses him of sexual assault. Edna Birch (Shirley Stelfox) and Bishop George believe Sally until she admits she lied before wrecking Ashley's house and leaves. Laurel returns but makes it clear that their marriage will take time to repair. Sally returns and tries to get her revenge by drugging Ashley and raping him. In the aftermath, Ashley tells Laurel and they call the police. After Sally is arrested, Laurel forgives him.

Sadly, Ashley and Laurel's marriage continues to deteriorate and Ashley realises Laurel is getting very close to Marlon Dingle (Mark Charnock). After a few months, she admits that she has feelings for Marlon, but they have not had sex. To test Laurel's commitment to him, Ashley asks Laurel to renew their wedding vows and move to a parish in Leeds. She agrees to renewing their vows but insists they stay in Emmerdale and they try to repair their marriage. They have their vow renewal during Christmas and despite Ashley's concerns and attempted interference from Marlon, everything goes well. After a comment by Sandy questioning whether Laurel truly loves him, Ashley grabs his father aggressively and its clear cracks are starting to set into the vicar's mind.

Paranoid that Laurel is going to leave him, Ashley starts taking his stress out on Sandy and abuses him. Eventually, Ashley's anger gets more and more apparent and Rachel Breckle (Gemma Oaten) becomes suspicious. She calls Adult Services, infuriating Ashley and Laurel, who trusts Ashley. To make sure that Laurel doesn't find out, Ashley forces Sandy to agree to move into a care home. After seeing Sandy acting nervous around Ashley, Laurel starts to begins to suspect Ashley. After Sandy refuses to tell her anything, Laurel secretly goes to speak to Rachel. When he discovers that Laurel has seen Rachel, a panicking Ashley assumes Sandy told her something and hits him again, but is left stunned when Laurel walks in and finally catches him. The truth about the abuse is revealed and Laurel breaks up with him, leaving Ashley horrified.

Laurel tries to convince Sandy to report Ashley and after telling Edna, she calls the police. Despite this, Sandy refuses to make a statement as he doesn't want to betray Ashley. The rest of the village soon finds out and Ashley is left disgraced. He eventually confesses, leading to an arrest and a caution. He resigns from his job and Laurel asks for a separation before throwing him out. Unemployed and homeless, Ashley breaks down, having lost everything.

Guilty that his feelings for Laurel orchestrated the start of Ashley's downfall, Marlon finds him and asks him to move in with him. Ashley gets a job as a barman at The Woolpack and over the next year, Ashley gets his life back on track and his family forgive him.

In December 2013, 17 years after initially becoming the Vicar of St. Mary's Church, Ashley gets his old job back. However, after discovering that his rival, Harriet, was the first choice but resigned because of him, he gave the job up for her. Harriet is later fired after officiating an unauthorized same-sex blessing for Ali and Ruby. Ashley regains his position as vicar for Saint Mary's church. Harriet and Ashley begin a relationship soon after. Ashley is critically injured after being run over by Victoria Sugden (Isabel Hodgins) who was intentionally aiming for Adam. After having numerous seizures, he learns that he has epilepsy. He struggles to cope with his condition and soon realises that he is losing his memory. Ashley takes some memory tests. However, these tests lead to a diagnosis of vascular dementia.

Ashley reunites with Laurel and they become engaged. Ashley and Laurel are later remarried, but on their wedding night, Laurel is devastated when Ashley cannot remember them marrying and thinks that she is married to Marlon and he is with Harriet. During a church service on Easter Sunday, Ashley suffers a crisis of faith and decides to retire from his duties as vicar. Ashley becomes a father again, when Laurel gives birth to a daughter, Dotty Thomas, named after Ashley's & Luke's late mother and Sandy's late wife.

Among the next few months Ashley's dementia worsens and in October 2016 he is one of many residents injured in a large car pile up after he drives away from the village when he forgets Dotty's christening. Laurel later takes the hard decision to put Ashley into a home and is heartbroken when she finds out he has forgotten who she is and found another woman who also had dementia. In March 2017, Ashley is visited by Laurel regularly however he begins developing a cold and after dancing with his friend Bob Hope he begins coughing blood and is taken to hospital. Laurel is distraught to hear that Ashley may only have a few days left to live and takes him back home to live with her. At home, Laurel is overjoyed when Ashley recognises her. When she leaves Ashley for a minute to get him more comfortable with pillows, he dies peacefully. Laurel returns and upon discovering Ashley has died, she hugs his body. Sandy, Arthur, Bernice and Gabby discover Laurel hugging his body and are devastated when they realise that he has died.

== Reception ==
A writer from Holy Soap named Ashley's most memorable moment as being the "dramatic race to the airport" to prevent Laurel from leaving. In August 2017, Middleton was longlisted for Best Actor and Best Exit at the Inside Soap Awards, while he and Bellamy were longlisted for Best Partnership and the episode from Ashley's viewpoint was longlisted for Best Show-Stopper. While the episode from Ashley's viewpoint did not make its shortlist, Middleton's other nominations did. On 6 November 2017, Middleton won the "Best Exit" accolade.
