= James Carlton =

James Carlton may refer to:

- James Carlton (actor) (born 1977), English actor
- James Carlton (athlete) (1909–1951), Australian sprinter
- Jim Carlton (1935–2015), Australian politician

== See also ==
- James Carleton (disambiguation)
