= Veralynn =

Veralynn may refer to:

- 4214 Veralynn, a main-belt asteroid
- Vera Lynn (1917–2020), English singer whose career flourished during World War II
- Vera-Lynn, a minor Emmerdale character
