= J. Carleton Bell =

American educational psychologist

- Born: November 12, 1872; Mount Vernon, Ohio, U.S.
- Died: February 28, 1946 (aged 73); Winter Park, Florida, U.S.
- Education: Denison University; Harvard University
- Scientific career
- Fields: Educational psychologist
- Workplaces: City College of New York

James Carleton Bell (December 11, 1872 – February 28, 1946) was an American educational psychologist and professor of education at the City College of New York.

== Biography ==
Bell was born in Mount Vernon, Ohio, on December 11, 1872. After graduating from Mount Vernon High School in 1891, he received his B.A. from Denison University in 1896. He then attended the University of Berlin and the University of Leipzig in Germany before enrolling at Harvard University. He received his A.M. and Ph.D. from Harvard in 1903 and 1904, respectively. He then taught Latin at the Boston Latin School for one year before taking a position as instructor in experimental psychology at Wellesley College for two years; then, he became director of the experimental psychology lab at the Brooklyn Training School for Teachers. In 1912, he joined the faculty of the University of Texas, where he was Professor of the Art of Teaching from then until September 1916, when he returned to the Brooklyn Training School for Teachers. In 1910, he was one of four founding editors-in-chief of the Journal of Educational Psychology, along with William Bagley, Carl Seashore, and Guy Montrose Whipple. Bell served as the journal's managing editor from 1910 to 1920. In 1924, he joined the faculty of the City College of New York (CCNY) as Professor of Education. From 1926 to 1929, he was director of the CCNY-affiliated high school Townsend Harris Hall. He died of a coronary thrombosis in Winter Park, Florida, on February 28, 1946.
