= Brooklyn Training School for Teachers =

- 760 Prospect Place, Brooklyn, New York; United States

Information
- Type: Teacher education
- Opened: 1885; 141 years ago
- Closed: 1933; 93 years ago
- Principal: Emma L. Johnston

The Brooklyn Training School for Teachers was a school in Brooklyn, New York dedicated to teacher education. It was founded in 1885, originally on the site of what is now Public School (P.S.) 4, and later expanded to include the current location of P.S. 69. When it was founded, it was the first municipal school dedicated to training teachers in the state of New York. In 1904, the educator Emma L. Johnston became its principal. In 1907, it was reopened as a dedicated teacher training school, with an accompanying model school. The new building was designed by C. B. J. Snyder, was constructed from 1902 to 1907 at 760 Prospect Place, and is now Brooklyn's P.S. 138. It was permanently closed down by the New York City government in 1933.
