= James P. Carleton =

American politician (1812–1853)

James P. Carleton (February 24, 1812 – October 3, 1853) was an American politician.

Carleton was a Democrat who served a single term on the Iowa Legislative Assembly from December 4, 1843, to May 4, 1845, representing the seventh district of the Iowa Territorial House of Representatives. During his tenure on the Sixth Iowa Legislative Assembly, Carleton concurrently served as speaker of the territorial house.
