= Peter Cartwright (actor) =

South African actor (1935-2013)

- Born: 30 August 1935; Krugersdorp, Gauteng, South Africa
- Died: 18 November 2013 (aged 78); London, England
- Occupation: Actor
- Years active: 1969–2013
- Spouse: Peggy Naughton (2013-2013; his death)

Peter Cartwright (30 August 1935 – 18 November 2013) was a South African born British actor who made hundreds of appearances in television, film and radio and worked extensively in the theatre, both in the provinces and London's West End.

Cartwright was born in Krugersdorp, Gauteng, South Africa, and educated at St. Andrew's College in Grahamstown. He arrived in Britain in 1959 and studied at RADA.

He was best known in South Africa for a series of television commercials in which he portrayed Charles Glass, the legendary founder of South African Breweries and the brewmaster who brewed Castle Lager. He died of cancer at his home in London on 18 November 2013, aged 78.

== Selected TV credits ==
He appeared in Softly, Softly: Task Force, Z-Cars, Rumpole of the Bailey, Danger UXB, Yes Prime Minister, Casualty, Shackleton, Longitude, The Vicar of Dibley, Doctor Who and Strangers and Brothers.

He also appeared in the British soap Emmerdale playing George Postlethwaite, the fictional bishop of Skipdale.

== Selected film credits ==
In Harry Potter and the Order of the Phoenix, he played the wizard Elphias Doge, a member of the Order of the Phoenix, escorting Harry to Grimmauld Place.

Other films include Wimbledon, Cry Freedom, Gandhi and The Fourth Protocol.

== Filmography ==
Year	Title	Role	Notes
1978	Let's Get Laid	Film Director	
1979	A Nightingale Sang in Berkeley Square	Major Treadwell	
1982	Gandhi	European Passenger	
1987	The Fourth Protocol	Jan Marais	
1987	Cry Freedom	Senior police officer	
1996	The Innocent Sleep	Gerald Phillips	
2004	Wimbledon	Elderly Man in Lift	
2007	Harry Potter and the Order of the Phoenix	Elphias Doge	

== Stage credits ==
Sleuth (Fortune Theatre, West End), Habeas Corpus (Theatre Royal, Windsor), Don Carlos (Royal Exchange, Manchester),
