= Charlotte Bellamy =

English actress

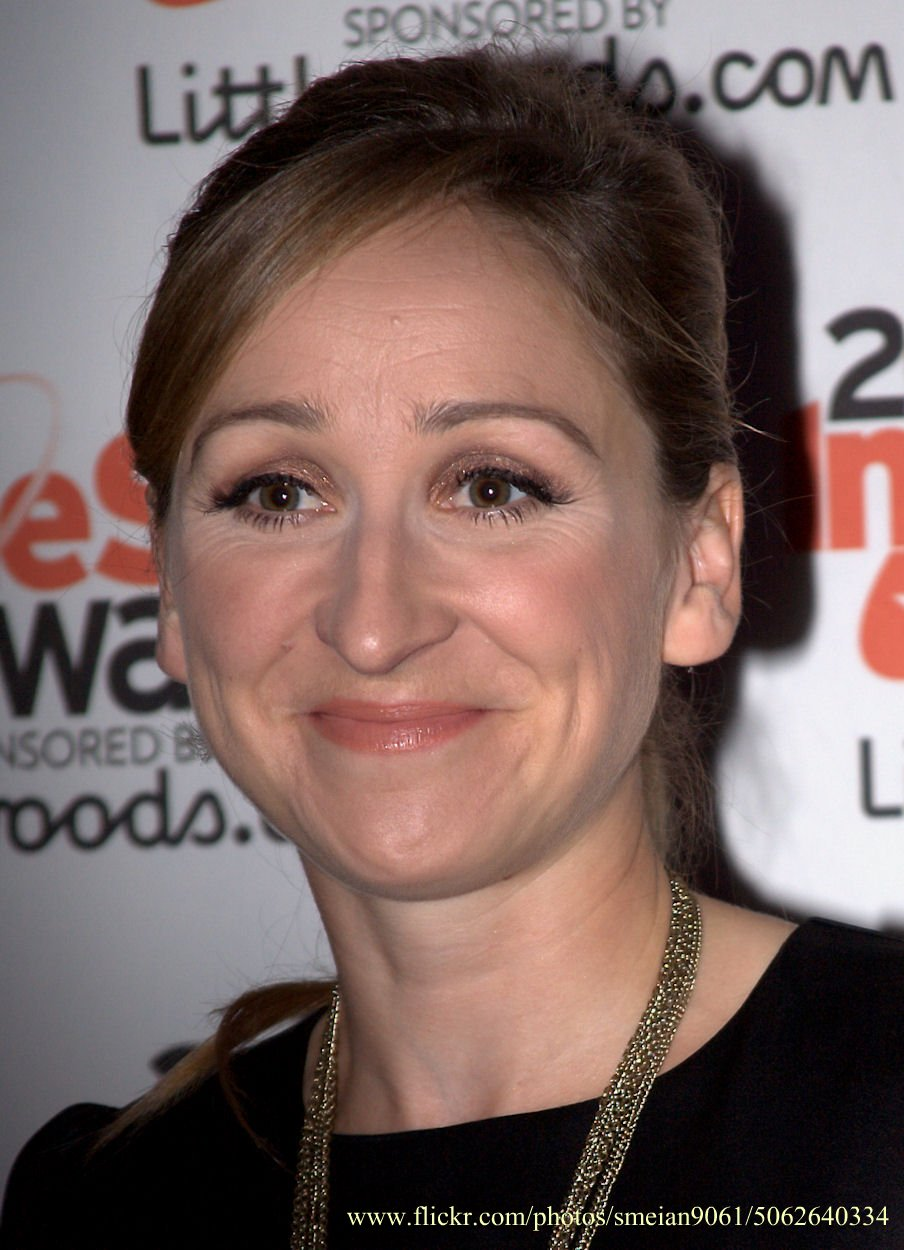
- Bellamy at the 2010 Inside Soap Awards
- Born: 19 March 1973 (age 52); Dover, Kent, England
- Occupation: Actress
- Years active: 1993–present
- Known for: Role of Laurel Thomas in Emmerdale
- Spouse: Mungo Denison (m. 2012)
- Children: 3

Charlotte Bellamy (born 19 March 1973) is an English actress. She is known for her long-running role as Laurel Thomas in Emmerdale on ITV. Other television roles included Sue Taylor in EastEnders (1997), and Harriet Potter in The Broker's Man (1998), before she joined Emmerdale in 2002. She won the British Soap Award for Best Actress in 2017.

== Acting career ==
In 1994, Bellamy played the character Elaine, in the episode "Nowhere To Run" of ITV's The Bill. In 1996, she was Jaimie Merrick in A Touch of Frost episode "Deep Waters". In 1997, she played religious fanatic Sue Taylor in BBC's EastEnders; and, in 1998, she was Cissie in a London Weekend Television production of Tess of the D'Urbervilles. Bellamy is best known for her part in Emmerdale as Laurel Thomas.

== Personal life ==
Bellamy is married to Mungo Denison, with three children. She had her first child in 2004, her second in 2007, and her third in 2009.

== Awards and nominations ==
Bellamy has been nominated as Best Actress at the British Soap Awards three times; she won in 2017. She has also been nominated twice for Best Dramatic Performance. In 2017, she was nominated for Best On-Screen Partnership with John Middleton, who played the part of Laurel's husband Ashley Thomas.
