= Samantha Giles =

British actress

- Born: Samantha Elizabeth Giles; 2 July 1971 (age 55); Maidstone, Kent, England
- Occupations: Actress; author
- Years active: 1993–present
- Known for: Emmerdale; Where the Heart Is; Hollyoaks
- Spouse: Sean Pritchard (m. 2010)
- Children: 2

Samantha Elizabeth Giles (born 2 July 1971) is an English actress and author. She is best known for playing Bernice Blackstock in the ITV soap opera Emmerdale. She had also played Sally Boothe in the ITV drama series Where the Heart Is and Valerie Holden in the Channel 4 soap opera Hollyoaks. She departed from Emmerdale in 2019 to focus on other creative projects, such as writing her debut novel, Rosemary and the Witches of Pendle Hill, released in August 2020. In April 2021, it was confirmed that she would be returning to Emmerdale.

== Career ==
From 1998 to 2002, and again in 2004, Giles played Bernice Blackstock in the ITV soap opera Emmerdale. For her role as Bernice, she won the TV Quick Award for Best Actress. Giles' other television credits include Doctors, Dangerfield and Midnight Man. Her stage credits include A Taste of Honey (as Helen), Dead Funny (Lisa), and Season's Greetings (Belinda). In December 2007, it was announced that Giles was to join the cast of the Channel 4 soap opera Hollyoaks in 2008 as Valerie Holden, a role that she had taken over from actress Jacqueline Leonard. She returned in July 2010, and left again in August 2010. In December 2010, Giles appeared on Celebrity Mastermind where her specialist subject was the works of Alfred Hitchcock. Giles returned to Emmerdale in 2012. However, in 2019, Giles announced her departure from the series to focus on other creative projects. In August 2020, her first book, titled Rosemary and the Witches of Pendle Hill, was published. After Emmerdale producers offered a return to Giles in 2021, she accepted; her return scenes aired on 27 May. She left the role again in 2023, and had returned for a guest stint in 2025.

== Filmography ==
Year	Title	Role	Notes
1994–1995	Coronation Street	Kirsty	Recurring role
1997	New Voices	Michelle Roberts	Episode: "Supplies"
1997	Midnight Man	Mary Farmer	Television film
1998	Dangerfield	Amy	Episode: "The Long Weekend"
1998–2002, 2004, 2012–2019, 2021–2023, 2025	Emmerdale	Bernice Blackstock	Regular role
2003–2006	Where the Heart Is	Sally Boothe	Main role; 28 episodes
2007	Doctors	Pia Marshall	Episode: "Bon Voyage"
2008, 2010	Hollyoaks	Valerie Holden	Regular role; 34 episodes
2011	Doctors	Felicia Bennett	Episode: "An Inspector Calls"
2011	The Case	Monica Sauzer	Episode #1.4
2012	Crime Stories	Kate Spencer	Episode #1.7
2015	Nomads	Penny	Television series
2025	The Football Fantastics	Val	Television series

== Stage ==
- 1993, Rosalind in Double D directed by June Brown
- 2004, Jennifer in Party Piece at the Theatre Royal Windsor directed by Mark Piper
- 2010, Marge in Absent Friends at the Oldham Coliseum/Harrogate/Anvil Arts Production directed by Nikolai Foster
- 2007, Lisa in Dead Fully at the Oldham Coliseum and National Tour directed by Nikolai Foster
- 2006, Helen in A Taste of Honey - National Tour at the Oldham Coliseum directed by Stuart Wood
- 2006, Belinda in Seasons Greetings at the Liverpool Playhouse directed by Nikolai Foster

== Awards and nominations ==
Year	Award	Category	Result	Ref.
1999	5th National Television Awards	Most Popular Newcomer	Nominated	
2000	6th National Television Awards	Most Popular Actress	Nominated	
2002	British Soap Awards	Best Actress	Nominated	
2002	British Soap Awards	Sexiest Female	Nominated	
2002	British Soap Awards	Best On-Screen Partnership (shared with John Middleton)	Nominated	
2014	Inside Soap Awards	Funniest Female	Nominated	
2015	Inside Soap Awards	Funniest Female	Nominated	
2016	Inside Soap Awards	Funniest Female	Nominated	
2018	Inside Soap Awards	Funniest Female	Nominated	
2019	Inside Soap Awards	Funniest Female	Nominated	
2021	Inside Soap Awards	Funniest Performance	Nominated	
2023	2023 British Soap Awards	Best Comedy Performance	Nominated	
2023	Inside Soap Awards	Best Comic Performance	Nominated	
