= James Carlton (actor) =

British actor

- Born: James Slark; 16 November 1977 (age 48); Bolton, England
- Occupation: Actor/Almond Grower
- Years active: 1998–present
- Children: 2

James Slark (born 16 November 1977) known professionally as James Carlton, is an English actor best known for playing Jason Kirk in Emmerdale and PC Steve Crane in Heartbeat.

He played Jason Kirk from 1999 to 2002 and 35 episodes as Steve Crane from 2003 to 2004. He has also appeared in minor roles or as a visitor in Casualty, Merseybeat, Cold Feet, At Home with the Braithwaites, Where the Heart Is, Doctors and Peep Show.
