= Sheree Murphy =

English actress and television presenter

- Born: Sheree Victoria Murphy; 22 August 1975 (age 51); Stoke Newington, London, England
- Education: Italia Conti Academy of Theatre Arts
- Television: Only Fools and Horses (1996); Emmerdale (1998–2004); I'm a Celebrity...Get Me Out of Here! (2005); Hollyoaks (2010–11); Neighbours (2014, 2018); Celebrity MasterChef (2015); Yes Chef! (2016–); Morning Live (2022–)
- Spouse: Harry Kewell (m. 2002)
- Children: 4

Sheree Victoria Murphy (born 22 August 1975) is an English actress and television presenter, best known for her roles as Tricia Dingle in the ITV soap opera Emmerdale, Eva Strong in the Channel 4 soap opera Hollyoaks and Dakota Davies in the Australian soap opera Neighbours.

In 2005, Murphy came second in the fifth series of I'm a Celebrity...Get Me Out of Here! and competed in the 2015 series of Celebrity MasterChef. In September 2016, she became the presenter of a cookery programme on BBC One called Yes Chef!

== Early life ==
Born in Stoke Newington, north London, Murphy was the middle child and only daughter in a family of five children. The family lived in a council house, and she was educated from age nine at the Italia Conti Academy of Theatre Arts. She then attended the Sylvia Young Theatre School.

Murphy's first part was in the musical The Rink at the Cambridge Theatre, aged 12. She did not work professionally again until Emmerdale, working her way through school from aged 14 as a hairdresser's assistant. She also worked front of house in various north London theatres.

== Career ==
Her first TV appearance was a small role as a mugger in Only Fools and Horses 1996 Christmas episode "Heroes and Villains". She soon landed the role as Tricia Dingle on Emmerdale, which she played from 1998 to 2004. It was announced in late 2003 that Murphy would leave Emmerdale in December 2003, so that she could spend more time with her family and two young children, in the show, her character was killed off.

Following a six-year career break to bring up her family, Murphy appeared in The Royal before taking the part of Eva Strong in Hollyoaks.

In November and December 2005, Murphy appeared on the ITV reality show I'm a Celebrity... Get Me Out of Here!, finishing second to Carol Thatcher. Murphy presented the ITV spin-off series for series 6 with Phillip Schofield. In November 2007, she presented This Morning's coverage of the seventh series every weekday morning.

In 2005 and 2006, Murphy presented ITV2's coverage of the British Soap Awards. Murphy hosted Footballers' Cribs for MTV UK and VH1 UK, and was a regular on ITV's Loose Women (2006–2007), returning in 2012 for a single episode to celebrate 40 years of Emmerdale and a further single episode in July 2015.

In January 2007, Murphy co-hosted ITV2's Soapstar Superstar: Bonus Tracks with Mark Durden-Smith and also starred as the 'hidden' celebrity in a 2007 episode of the CBBC show Hider in the House.

Murphy joined the presenting team for Channel 5's Cowboy Builders. During the 2010 World Cup, Murphy fronted a 'World Cup Fever' campaign for Gala Bingo.

On 16 June 2014, it was announced that Murphy had joined the cast of the Australian soap opera Neighbours playing an old acquaintance of Paul Robinson called Dakota Davies.

Murphy is a regular contributor on BBC's Morning Live programme, where she shares cooking tips and recipes with viewers.

== Filmography ==
| Year | Title | Role | Notes |
|---|---|---|---|
| 1988 | Salome's Last Dance | Child | Minor Role |
| 1996 | Only Fools and Horses | Dawn | Supporting Role (1 Episode) |
| 1996 | The Bill | Laura Evans | Supporting Role (1 Episode) |
| 1997 | The Bill | Lizzie | Supporting Role (1 Episode) |
| 1998 | Berkeley Square | Florrie Smith | Main Role (4 Episodes) |
| 1998–2004 | Emmerdale | Tricia Dingle | Regular Role (374 Episodes) |
| 2000–2016 | Loose Women | Herself | Recurring Panelist (44 Episodes) |
| 2005 | I'm a Celebrity... Get Me Out of Here! | Herself | Participant (Runner-up) |
| 2006 | The Royal | Tanya Willson | 1 Episode |
| 2006, 2015 | The Wright Stuff | Herself | Panelist (2 Episodes) |
| 2007 | Soapstar Superstar: Bonus Tracks | Herself | Presenter (9 Episodes) |
| 2010–2011 | Hollyoaks | Eva Strong | Regular Role (30 Episodes) |
| 2014, 2018 | Neighbours | Dakota Davies | Regular Role (13 Episodes) |
| 2016–2017 | Yes Chef | Herself | Presenter (40 Episodes) |
| 2022 | Morning Live | Herself | Presenter (3 Episodes) |

== Personal life ==
Murphy is married to Australian footballer Harry Kewell. They met at the Majestyk nightclub, Leeds, in 2000 and were married on 25 May 2002 in Las Vegas.

They have four children together: son Taylor (born 2001) and daughters Ruby (born 17 June 2003), Matilda (born 19 March 2008) and Dolly (born 14 January 2012).

== Awards and nominations ==
| Year | Award | Category | Work | Result | Ref. |
|---|---|---|---|---|---|
| 2003 | British Soap Awards | Best Actress | Emmerdale | Nominated | |
| 2003 | British Soap Awards | Best On-Screen Partnership (shared with Mark Charnock) | Emmerdale | Nominated | |
| 2004 | British Soap Awards | Best Exit | Emmerdale | Won | |
| 2010 | TV Choice Awards | Best Soap Newcomer | Hollyoaks | Nominated | |
