= Nicola Wheeler =

English actress

- Born: 4 April 1974 (age 51); Burnley, Lancashire, England
- Years active: 1996–present
- Known for: Coronation Street; Emmerdale
- Children: 1

Nicola Wheeler (born 4 April 1974) is an English actress. After appearing in the ITV soap opera Coronation Street in the recurring role of Melanie Tindel in 1999, Wheeler began playing Nicola Blackstock in the ITV soap opera Emmerdale. She has been in the role of Nicola since 2001, with a brief break in 2006 where she competed in Cirque de Celebrité.

== Life and career ==
Wheeler was born on 4 April 1974 in Nelson, Lancashire and attended Walton High School. Wheeler trained at Drama Centre London from the age of 18. She began her career with appearances on television series including Derek Acorah's Ghost Towns and Kay Mellor's Gold. In 1999, she was cast in Coronation Street in the recurring role of Melanie Tindel. She joined Emmerdale as Nicola Blackstock in 2001 and served for five years before announcing her decision to leave. However, a year later, Wheeler announced her return to the soap. She won Best Bitch at the 2006 British Soap Awards for her portrayal. Wheeler appeared on the Sky One reality series Cirque de Celebrité; she was voted out on the fifth week by Blazin' Squad member Kenzie.

== Filmography ==
Year	Title	Role	Notes
1996	Poldark	Violet Kellow	1 episode
1997	Gold	Claudia	1 episode
1997	Band of Gold	Colette	1 episode
1999	Coronation Street	Melanie Tindel	Recurring role
2001–present	Emmerdale	Nicola King	Series regular
2006	Cirque de Celebrité	Herself	Contestant; 9th place
2010	Emmerdale: The Dingles - For Richer for Poorer	Nicola King	Film

== Awards and nominations ==
Year	Organisation	Category	Nominated work	Result	Ref.
2006	The British Soap Awards	Best Bitch	Emmerdale	Won	
2010	The British Soap Awards	Best On-Screen Partnership (with Nick Miles)	Emmerdale	Nominated	
