= John Middleton (actor) =

English actor (born 1953)

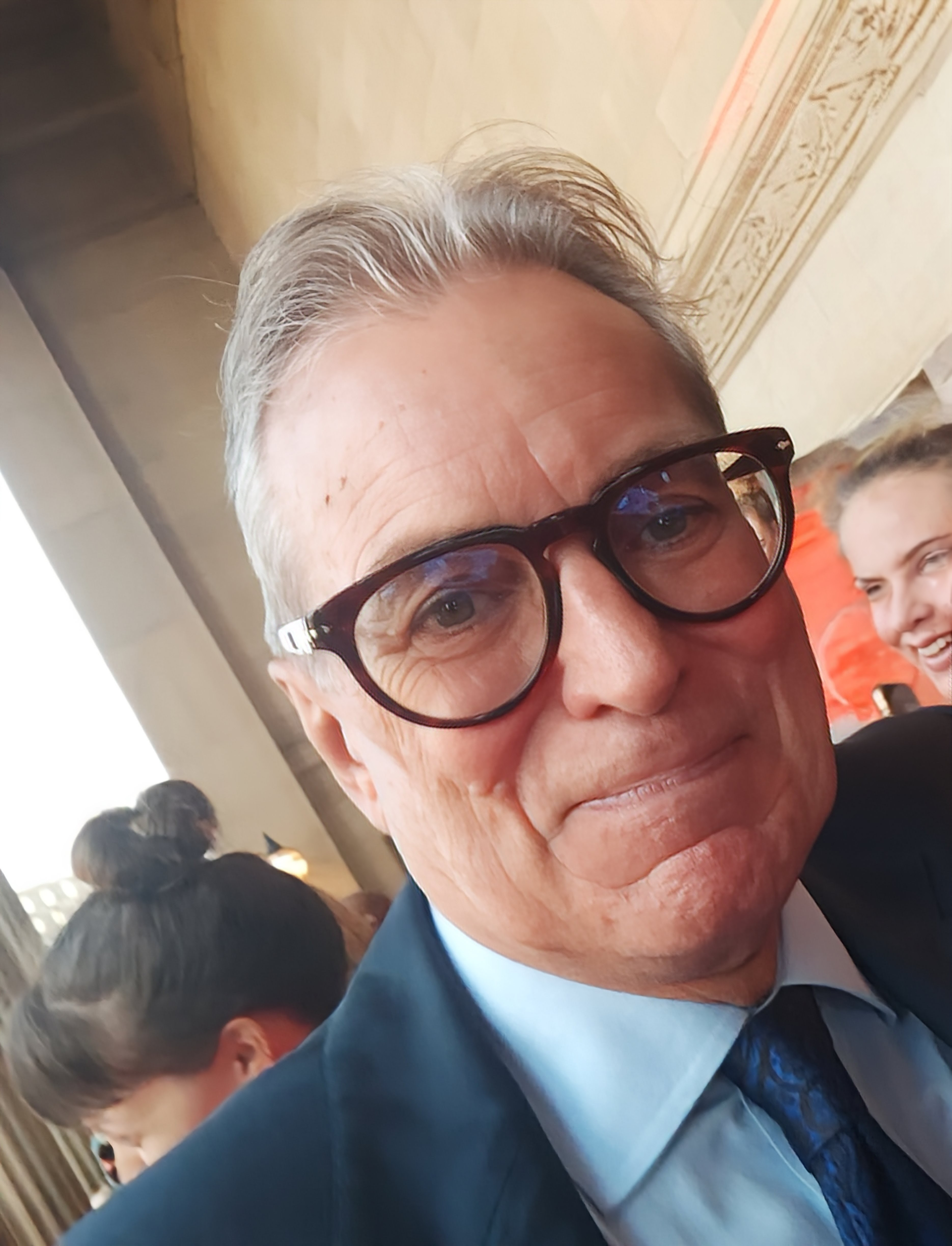
- Middleton in 2025
- Born: 7 September 1953 (age 72); Bradford, West Riding of Yorkshire, England
- Occupation: Actor
- Years active: 1989–present
- Spouse: Christine Middleton (m. 1983)
- Children: 2

John Middleton (born 7 September 1953) is an English actor, known for his role as Ashley Thomas in the ITV soap opera Emmerdale. Middleton played the role from 1996 to 2018. For his portrayal of Ashley, he won the British Soap Awards for Best Actor and Best Dramatic Performance in 2017. In 2025, he joined the Channel 4 soap opera Hollyoaks as Froggy Black.

== Career ==
Middleton began his acting career with various appearances and guest stints on British television series and films. In 1990 and 1995, he made appearances in the Channel 4 soap opera Brookside. Then in 1993 and 1995, he guest starred on the ITV soap opera Coronation Street, in the roles of John Hargreaves and Mr. Mitchell, respectively. In 1994, Middleton made a guest appearance in fellow ITV soap opera Emmerdale as John Jarvis, a police constable. He returned to Emmerdale in 1996, this time in the regular role of Ashley Thomas, a vicar.

Middleton remained on Emmerdale until 2018; his character was written out with a high-profile dementia storyline that saw Ashley die. The storyline saw Middleton nominated for and winning various accolades, including the British Soap Awards for Best Actor and Best Dramatic Performance at the 2017 ceremony. At the same ceremony, Ashley's dementia storyline also claimed the awards for Best Single Episode and Best Storyline, as well as Middleton and Charlotte Bellamy, who portrayed his on-screen wife, being nominated for Best On-Screen Partnership.

In October 2021, Middleton portrayed the role of Feargal Lumsden in an episode of the BBC soap opera Doctors. In 2023, Middleton was cast in a touring stage production of My Fair Lady. In 2025, he was cast in the Channel 4 soap opera Hollyoaks as villain Froggy Black.

== Personal life ==
Middleton is a member of the Labour Party. He stood to be a councillor for North Tyneside Council, but was beaten. He has stated that it was fortunate to have been beaten, since he was offered his regular role in Emmerdale shortly afterwards.

== Filmography ==
Year	Title	Role	Notes
1989	Shadow of the Noose	Elvey Robb	Episode: "Beside the Seaside"
1990, 1995	Brookside	Mr. Evans / Brian Halliwell	Recurring roles
1993	Bad Company	Radio Producer	Television film
1993	Crime Story	Geoff Foster	Episode: "Terrible Coldness: Graham Young"
1993	Prime Suspect	Fire Team Officer	Episode: "Keeper of Souls: Part 1"
1993, 1995	Coronation Street	John Hargreaves / Mr. Mitchell	Recurring roles
1994	In Suspicious Circumstances	Edwin Maybrick	Episode: "Poisoned Whispers"
1994	Medics	Simon	Episode: "All in the Mind"
1994	Heartbeat	Thompsett	Episode: "Mid Day Sun"
1994	Cracker	Simon	Episode: "Men Should Weep: Part 1"
1994	Emmerdale	John Jarvis	Guest role
1994	Finney	Brian	1 episode
1995	Eden Valley	Townie	Film
1995	The Gambling Man	Mr. Buckham	Recurring role
1995	The World of Lee Evans	Man Under Bed	Episode: "The Late Shift/Meet the Parents"
1996	The Ruth Rendell Mysteries	Peter Stanton	Episode: "Simisola: Part Two"
1996	Hetty Wainthropp Investigates	Simon Letby	Episode: "Lost Chords"
1996–2018	Emmerdale	Ashley Thomas	Regular role
1997	EastEnders	Doctor	2 episodes
1997	The Grand	Mr. Rigby	1 episode
1998	The Round Tower	Reg Walker	Television film
1998	The Things You Do for Love	Tony Warren	Television film
2021	Doctors	Feargal Lumsden	Episode: "No Place Like Home"
2025–2026	Hollyoaks	Froggy Black	Regular role

== Awards and nominations ==
Year	Ceremony	Category	Nominated work	Result	Ref.
2010	British Soap Awards	Best Actor	Emmerdale	Longlisted	
2012	British Soap Awards	Best Actor	Emmerdale	Longlisted	
2016	British Soap Awards	Best Actor	Emmerdale	Longlisted	
2017	British Soap Awards	Best Actor	Emmerdale	Won	
2017	British Soap Awards	Best On-Screen Partnership (with Charlotte Bellamy)	Emmerdale	Nominated	
2017	Inside Soap Awards	Best Actor	Emmerdale	Nominated	
2017	Inside Soap Awards	Best Exit	Emmerdale	Won	
