= Jeff Hordley =

British actor (born 1970)

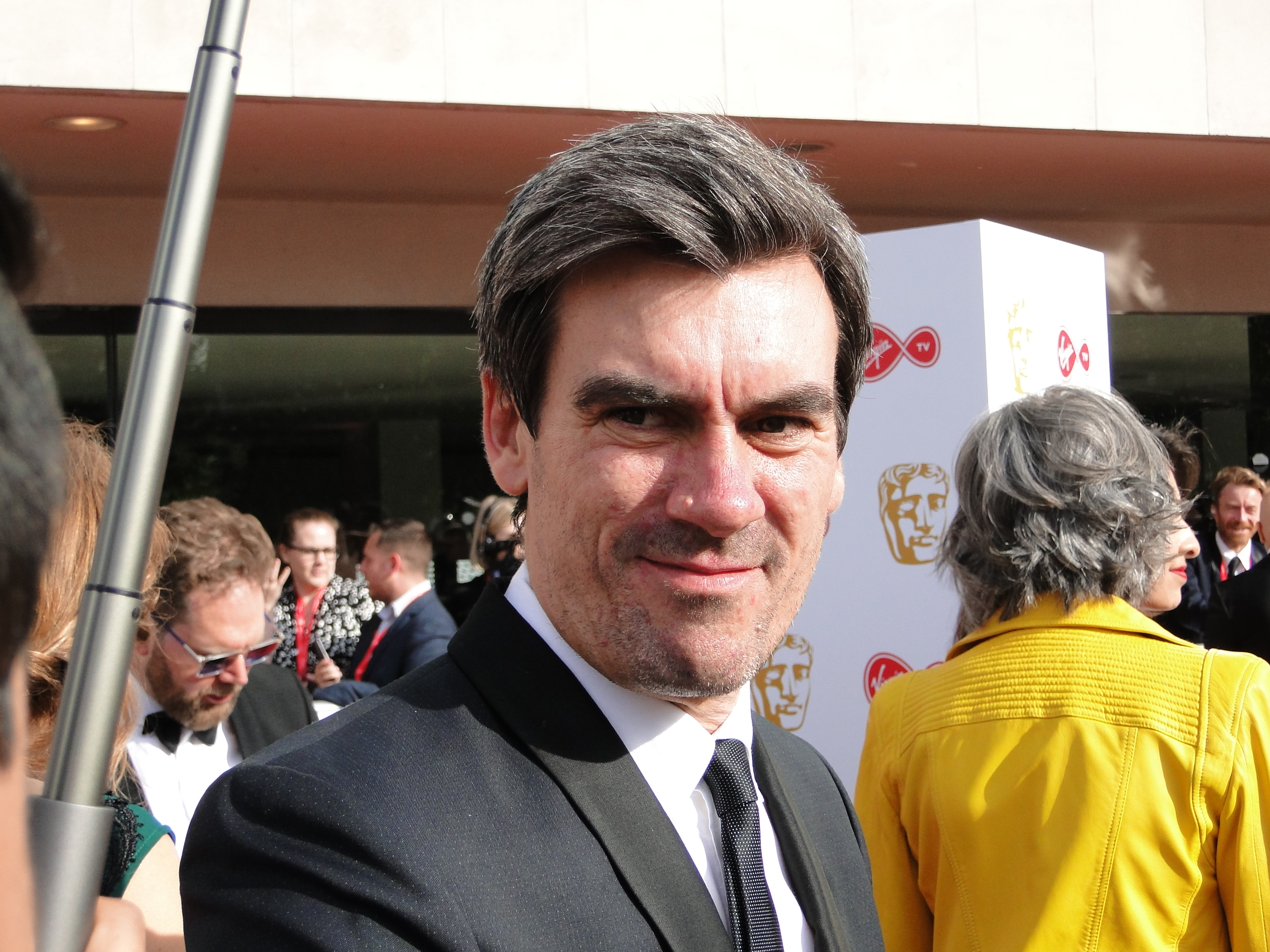
- Hordley in 2018
- Born: Jeffrey Thomas Percy; 7 March 1970 (age 56); Crumpsall, England
- Occupation: Actor
- Years active: 1997—present
- Spouse: Zoë Henry (m. 2003)
- Children: 2

Jeff Hordley (born Jeffrey Thomas Percy; 7 March 1970) is an English actor. For his portrayal of Cain Dingle in the ITV soap opera Emmerdale, he received three British Soap Award nominations for Best Actor.

== Early life ==
Hordley grew up in Oldham, Greater Manchester where he attended North Chadderton Comprehensive, before he went on to gain a BA (Hons) Theatre Arts (Acting) degree from Manchester Metropolitan University School of Theatre in 1997.

== Career ==
After making minor appearances in British soap operas, including Coronation Street, Hordley was cast as Cain Dingle in the ITV soap opera Emmerdale in 2000. In 2006, he announced his decision to leave the soap in order to pursue other projects; the chance of a return was kept open by the producers. Later that year, he starred in a production of Mother Goose at the Churchill Theatre in Bromley.

He later played Napoleon in George Orwell's Animal Farm at Leeds' West Yorkshire Playhouse in 2008, as well as the role of Mick in Harold Pinter's play The Caretaker, when staged at Bolton's Octagon Theatre in 2009.

Since his 2009 return to Emmerdale, Hordley was nominated for the 2012, 2013 and 2014 British Soap Award for Best Actor.

== Personal life ==
In 1996, Hordley was diagnosed with Crohn's disease. He has experienced symptoms since the age of 20 and has been hospitalised three times from his condition.

Hordley married Emmerdale co-star Zoë Henry in 2003; they have two children.

== Awards and nominations ==
Year	Award	Category	Result	Ref.
2010	British Soap Awards	Sexiest Male	Nominated	
2010	British Soap Awards	Villain of the Year	Nominated	
2011	16th National Television Awards	Serial Drama Performance	Nominated	
2011	British Soap Awards	Sexiest Male	Nominated	
2011	British Soap Awards	Villain of the Year	Nominated	
2011	British Soap Awards	Best On-Screen Partnership (shared with Emma Atkins)	Nominated	
2012	17th National Television Awards	Serial Drama Performance	Nominated	
2012	British Soap Awards	Sexiest Male	Nominated	
2012	British Soap Awards	Villain of the Year	Nominated	
2012	British Soap Awards	Best Actor	Nominated	
2012	British Soap Awards	Best On-Screen Partnership (shared with Atkins)	Nominated	
2012	British Soap Awards	Best Dramatic Performance	Nominated	
2012	Inside Soap Awards	Best Bad Boy	Shortlisted	
2013	All About Soap Awards	Forbidden Lovers (shared with Natalie J. Robb)	Nominated	
2013	British Soap Awards	Sexiest Male	Nominated	
2013	British Soap Awards	Best Actor	Shortlisted	
2013	TV Choice Awards	Best Soap Actor	Shortlisted	
2013	Inside Soap Awards	Best Bad Boy	Nominated	
2013	Inside Soap Awards	Best Actor	Shortlisted	
2014	19th National Television Awards	Serial Drama Performance	Nominated	
2014	British Soap Awards	Best Actor	Shortlisted	
2014	Inside Soap Awards	Best Bad Boy	Nominated	
2014	Inside Soap Awards	Sexiest Male	Nominated	
2014	Inside Soap Awards	Best Actor	Shortlisted	
2015	20th National Television Awards	Serial Drama Performance	Nominated	
2015	Inside Soap Awards	Best Actor	Nominated	
2016	Inside Soap Awards	Sexiest Male	Nominated	
2016	Inside Soap Awards	Best Bad Boy	Shortlisted	
2018	23rd National Television Awards	Serial Drama Performance	Nominated	
2018	British Soap Awards	Best Actor	Nominated	
2018	Inside Soap Awards	Best Actor	Nominated	
2019	24th National Television Awards	Serial Drama Performance	Nominated	
2019	British Soap Awards	Best Actor	Shortlisted	
2019	TV Choice Awards	Best Soap Actor	Shortlisted	
2019	Inside Soap Awards	Best Actor	Shortlisted	
2019	Digital Spy Reader Awards	Best Soap Actor (Male)	Nominated	
2020	25th National Television Awards	Serial Drama Performance	Nominated	
2020	RadioTimes.com Soap Awards	Best Actor	Nominated	
2020	Inside Soap Awards	Best Actor	Shortlisted	
2022	27th National Television Awards	Serial Drama Performance	Nominated	
2022	Inside Soap Awards	Best Actor	Nominated	
2022	Inside Soap Awards	Best Double Act (shared with Jonny McPherson)	Nominated	
2023	British Soap Awards	Best Leading Performer	Nominated	
2026	31st National Television Awards	Serial Drama Performance	Won	[44]
