= Viv Hope =

Fictional character from Emmerdale

- Emmerdale character
- Portrayed by: Deena Payne
- Duration: 1993–2011
- First appearance: Episode 1789; 10 August 1993
- Last appearance: Episode 5817; 13 January 2011
- Introduced by: Nicholas Prosser (1993); Gavin Blyth (2009)
In-universe information
- Occupation: Businesswoman
- Sisters: Lucy; Gina Bellwood
- Husband: Reg Dawson (backstory); Vic Windsor (until 1998); Bob Hope (2001–2005, 2006–2011)
- Sons: Scott Windsor; Heath Hope
- Daughters: Donna Windsor; Cathy Hope
- Stepsons: Josh Hope; Jamie Hope
- Stepdaughters: Kelly Windsor; Roxy Lockhart; Carly Hope; Dawn Woods
- Granddaughters: Jean Tate; April Windsor

Viv Hope (also Dawson and Windsor) is a fictional character from the British ITV soap opera Emmerdale. Portrayed by Deena Payne, the character first appeared on 10 August 1993, and remained until 13 January 2011, becoming one of the longest-serving characters, after nearly 18 years in the show; her tenure is currently the seventeenth-longest in the history of the show.

In November 2007, it was confirmed that Payne had asked for a break. To explain her absence Viv was sentenced to three years' imprisonment after she pleaded guilty to conspiracy to defraud. However, conman Freddie Yorke (Keith Woodason) stole the charity money and left her to take the blame. Viv was off-screen for eleven months, but made two brief appearances in October 2008. In June 2009, Payne resumed the role and returned on-screen in July. On 11 October 2010, it was announced Payne would leave after 18 years on the show. The character was killed off in January 2011, when Viv was trapped in an arson fire alongside Terry Woods (Billy Hartman), who was attempting to rescue her, and an explosion engulfed the Post Office, which instantly killed both Viv and Terry. On 13 January 2012, the village held a memorial service in memory of both Viv and Terry as a mark of respect.

== Creation ==
=== Casting ===
Viv was introduced in 1993 as part of the new Windsor family introduced by series producer Nicholas Prosser, who cast Payne in the role. Payne had started out as a dancer. She trained with raunchy Hot Gossip's choreographer, Arlene Phillips, performed in stage musicals and was a member of the band Cats U.K., as well as singing with pop stars such as Alan Price and B. A. Robertson.

In 1992, Payne had her first child, William. He was still a baby when Payne was offered the role of Viv Windsor a year later. "It was a big decision," recalls Deena, "because I had got my life quite well balanced. I didn't really think any further than getting work that would suit me as a mum." This part came along and it meant either travelling on a regular basis up and down from London to Yorkshire or moving up here. Payne took the job and found a small cottage in which to live for the first six months, where she brought William up and hired a nanny. She then realised that that arrangement was not working, so she and her husband Steve both moved to Leeds; Steve suggested they should rent a house in Yorkshire and still keep the house in the south.

During an interview in 2017, Payne said she was disappointed that she did not get an exit like former co-star John Middleton, referring to her own exit as a "damp squib". She expressed that, while not wanting to have exited in a live episode, she would have liked something "topical", although insisted she was content with the way her character exited the drama.

=== Personality ===
Payne had no problems tackling the role of Viv, a wife and mother in a family themselves moving from London to Yorkshire. Viv was the backbone of the Windsor family, but later cheated on husband Vic by having an affair with Woolpack manager Terry Woods in 1996. [...] "I saw exactly who she was," said Payne. "An Essex girl with high heels and colourful clothes – but slightly clashing in the way the colors are actually co-ordinated. She opens her mouth first and thinks afterwards – her reactions are quicker than her head but she has a heart".

According to Payne, "Viv is a very passionate woman, and becomes angry when she has no emotional outlet. She loses any patience she might have and fails to think before she speaks. She sees everything in black and white. If she thinks something's wrong, then it's wrong – end of story. No one can ever persuade her to see their point of view." Payne added, "There is a softer side to her, though, as she can be funny and enjoys a bit of banter with Emily, who now helps out in the post office. I don't actually think Viv's comic side has been sufficiently explored. When Vic was still alive, he and Viv had this great repartee ~ a bit like Jack and Vera Duckworth in Coronation Street. It's a shame that we weren't able to make more of it."

== Development ==
In November 2007 Payne called an urgent meeting with producer Kathleen Beedles, at which Payne revealed that she needed a rest from the hectic filming schedule. Payne told the Daily Star that she, after 16 years of enjoying the part of Viv, felt she was ready to take a break – "...to spend some time with my family and be a supportive mother through my son's GCSE year". In August 2008 Payne's sabbatical storyline reached its climax, when Viv was wrongly imprisoned for a fraud committed by conman Freddie Yorke (Keith Woodason). Viv was sentenced to three years in prison; the character returned in July 2009, after two appearances in October 2008. In June 2009 Payne resumed her role on a regular basis, and her return episode aired on 14 July 2009.

== Storylines ==
Viv arrives in Beckindale to view the post office with her husband, Vic (Alun Lewis), and their children, Scott (Toby Cockerell; Ben Freeman), Donna (Sophie Jeffery; Verity Rushworth) and Kelly (Adele Silva). She finds it hard to adapt to country life and does not realise how much her children are affected by the plane crash in December 1993. She intended to sue the Sugdens after Donna has an accident on their tractor and later supports Vic when he appears in court for assaulting looters. In June 1994, Reg Dawson (Niven Boyd), Viv's ex-husband and Scott's father, arrives in the village after being released from prison. He later takes Viv and Shirley Turner (Rachel Davies) hostage during a siege at the post office. Reg tries to shoot Viv but kills Shirley instead when she throws herself in front of her in an attempt to protect her. Reg later dies after being shot by a police marksman and Viv is rescued, unharmed. Reg leaves her £30,000 in his will, on condition that she gets a divorce from Vic. Viv, however, declines and stays with Vic.

In 1995, Viv is annoyed when Tina Dingle (Jacqueline Pirie) flirts with Vic and she bars Kim Tate (Claire King) from the post office when she and her husband, Frank (Norman Bowler), threaten them with eviction. After being arrested for standing at the barricades when Frank attempts to evict the Dingle family from their home, Viv regrets helping the Dingles and tries to make them leave the village. In 1996, after winning a dance competition with Terry Woods (Billy Hartman), Terry tries to persuade her to have an affair with him. Viv attempts to stay faithful to Vic at first when she is initially tempted. Viv later kisses Terry for comfort but later embarks on an affair with him until Vic cons her into thinking that she has won the lottery. She starts to hate him and eventually moves out to live with Terry in the Woolpack, but soon returns to Vic for her children's sake.

In 1997, Viv unsuccessfully tries to stop Kelly running away with Tom Bainbridge, a teacher whom she has an affair with. Viv blames Terry when Donna collapses after drinking alcopops and moves back into the post office. She also starts a campaign against Andy Hopwood (Kelvin Fletcher) at school and tries to seduce Paddy Kirk (Dominic Brunt), but he rejected Viv's advances.

In 1998, when Kelly announces her pregnancy, Viv disapproves but tries to be supportive when Kelly suffers a miscarriage. Viv eventually moves back home and is falsely accused of hitting Kelly but she is delighted when Scott returns home from the army. When Vic takes her on a birthday treat, the couple are reconciled, but on Christmas Day, Vic is killed in a robbery at the post office by Billy Hopwood (David Crellin) and Viv ends the year desperately trying to hold her family together.

In 1999, Kelly gets engaged to Roy Glover (Nicky Evans), and Viv offers to pay for their wedding. She also agrees to lend Scott Kelly's £5000 inheritance money from Vic to help build his business without Kelly's knowledge. But after Roy and Kelly's offer on a cottage was accepted they needed Kelly's money for the deposit. Horrified, Viv asks her friend Stella to lend it to her but when Kelly finds out, she punches Viv. In 2000, Viv starts the new year by deciding to sell the shop. Viv throws Kelly and Scott out of her house after they sleep together and she goes on holiday to Spain. Viv briefly becomes attracted to Carlos Diaz (Gary Turner), the new diner chef. A hosiery salesman, Bob Hope (Tony Audenshaw), changes Viv's life almost immediately, and after he seduces her with his charm, he moves in with her. Her friend, Carol Wareing, reappears, and announces she will be staying with them. Viv tells Bob she wants more commitment from him.

In 2001, Viv and Bob's relationship experiences problems but in February, they get married. Carol and Viv strike a deal that Viv would sell her the Post Office, planning to buy the B&B, but Carol goes behind Viv's back and buys the B&B for herself. Furious at her friend's betrayal, Viv throws Carol out of the house and she responds by hiding a bag of frozen prawns in a curtain rail. Bob's excuses make Viv suspicious and she entraps him into admitting the existence of another wife, Barbara. Viv forgives him, and decides to try to raise some cash for a honeymoon by entering the Naughty Nylons competition organised by Bob's firm. Viv wins and Bob is fired.

The move infuriates Viv so much that she throws Bob out and the couple begin divorce proceedings. To make matters more difficult for Viv, Scott begins a relationship with Bob's daughter Dawn (Julia Mallam). Alone and unhappy, Viv begins flirting with her employee and best friend Emily Kirk's (Kate McGregor) husband Paddy whom she had previously tried to seduce eight years earlier. A misunderstanding leads Paddy to confess to sleeping with Viv, resulting in Emily smashing up the shop, resigning from her job and announcing their deception to all the villagers in The Woolpack. Viv is at her lowest point and things only get worse when Scott is injured, following a violent showdown at Home Farm with Zoe Tate (Leah Bracknell), mother of his daughter, Jean (Megan Pearson). The accident brings Kelly back to the village and although there is still some tension between them, Viv seems to enjoy having her around again.

Viv's luck later changes for the better when she and Bob finally reconcile after working together in a cooking competition and Viv excitedly begins planning their second wedding. The event intended to be a double wedding with Donna and her fiancé, Marlon Dingle (Mark Charnock). Bob tells Viv that he wants to get back in touch with all his children. Viv sets about contacting them and discovers that he has children with every single one of his wives, except her.

On their wedding day, Viv is horrified when Bob fails to arrive. It transpires that Bob has actually spent the night in a hotel after a vasectomy reversal and is taken prisoner by his ex-wife and Dawn's mother Jean Hope (Julie Higginson) who begs him to leave Viv and get back together with her. When Bob finally arrives they have a row, but walk down the aisle and tie the knot for a second time.

Although they spend months trying for a baby, Viv does not seem able to get pregnant. After a test, Viv is sure she is pregnant but it later transpires to be a false alarm. The Hopes are told Viv may be too old to have another child. Thrown into despair, Viv asks Donna to be a surrogate mother, in exchange for a deposit on a dream house for herself and Marlon.

After Dawn's death in the showhouse explosion, Bob is devastated and the day of Dawn's funeral, Viv discovers she is pregnant and expecting twins. Bob initially tells her that he does not want any more children but he is with her when she gives birth to Cathy (Gabrielle Dowling) and Heath (Sebastian Dowling) on 9 February 2007. Viv starts parenting classes in the café, telling parents how to raise their children and what routines they should follow. This leads to a few angry residents including Lisa Dingle (Jane Cox), saying that Viv is being a busybody.

Viv begins raising money for children's charities, a drive which gains a higher profile when Ashley (John Middleton) and Laurel Thomas (Charlotte Bellamy) lose their son Daniel to cot death. But the man she entrusts with the charity money, Freddie Yorke (Keith Woodason), takes it and vanishes. Viv and Bob go to the police but Viv implicates herself when she admits moving funds around. Viv and Bob try to keep the investigation a secret, but she is arrested at a party thrown for her at The Woolpack in honour of her charity efforts. Viv and Bob are charged with conspiracy to defraud and whenever Viv tries to clear her name, she makes matters worse. With the help of a private investigator, Viv finds Freddie, but he threatens her children's lives and physically attacks her, putting stolen money in her bag as a goodbye present before getting away. On 20 August 2008, after Donna nearly dies in a car accident whilst pursuing Freddie, Viv pleads guilty in court and is later sentenced to three years imprisonment. Her voice is later heard on a recording she makes of a bedtime story for Bob, Heath and Cathy. Viv appears briefly on 10 October, when Bob pretends to be a postman so he can see her. He does this when she is doing prison work, and Bob tells Viv he loves her. She is seen again on 16 October, when Bob pretends to be a drama teacher under the name of Terry Woods, to see Viv. He and Viv perform a piece of drama together where Bob explains to Viv about a man whose wife refuses to see him while she is in prison. This makes Viv cry as she tells Bob that the reason she does not want to see him was so he would remember her how she wanted him to and that her children could see her in her current predicament. Viv starts crying and reveals to everyone who "Terry" really is.

In July 2009, Viv sends Bob a letter asking him to visit. As Viv had refused to see Bob while she was in prison, he assumes she wanted to end their marriage, and chooses not to see her. Instead, he has comfort sex with Gennie Walker (Sian Reese-Williams). The next day, Viv, after being granted early release for good behaviour, returns to the village. She needs money to pay for her taxi and returns to the café/post office, only for Brenda Walker (Lesley Dunlop) to mistake her for a thief and restrain her until Paddy clears up the confusion by identifying Viv.

Viv is upset at the changes during the past year, particularly when the twins do not recognize her. Viv soon reveals that she had not been in touch with Bob and the children because she had been appealing against the length of her sentence. Bob is furious, but when his anger reduces Viv to tears, he apologizes. The next day, Val Pollard (Charlie Hardwick) informs Viv that Brenda now owns half of the business. She goes to Essex for a week to visit Donna to see how she is getting on after leaving her husband, Marlon, and the village for a new job during Viv's absence. Seeing that Donna is happy and has a new boyfriend, Viv returns to the village where she clashes repeatedly with Brenda. They eventually call a truce after Viv hears Brenda talking about her money worries and Viv tells Terry, who was currently Brenda's boyfriend. Brenda and Viv then make an effort to get on so that the shop and the café run smoothly. Viv's life seems to be back on track, but things decline again when it is revealed that Bob had had sex with Brenda's adoptive daughter, Gennie, his son Jamie's girlfriend whilst she was in prison.

Viv splits up with Bob after coming to the realisation that they are both no longer compatible. She then displays envy regarding Bob's friendship with Lizzie Lakely (Kitty McGeever). In August 2010, Viv begins bonding with fellow Londoner Hazel Rhodes (Pauline Quirke), but again becomes jealous when Hazel befriends Bob. Viv finds it very hard to accept the split, and she later hopes that it will not be permanent.

She tries to reconcile with Bob by getting his attention by using their children as an excuse and faking break-ins at the shop, after Bob helps her after a real burglary. She also attempts to make Bob jealous by pretending that she has moved on and makes up stories about men she has met whilst out. After being encouraged by her former lover Terry after he finds out that she had faked the burglaries, Viv resumes her love of salsa dance classes and genuinely seems to be trying to move on and adjust to being single again, having fun and seeking a new boyfriend.

Terry supports Viv through this and accompanies her to the dance competitions as he used to when they had their affair, and encourages her to look to the future and be happy. Viv misinterprets his friendliness, and makes a move on him believing he wants to restart their relationship and kisses him and he hesitates before leaving the café in shock. Terry later visits Viv and lets her down gently and tells her that he was just trying to cheer her up and that he regards her as a special friend and that they cannot get back together as he is with Brenda.

Viv drowns her sorrows by drinking a bottle of wine. She falls asleep on the sofa and is oblivious when the post office and flat catches fire after corrupt police officer Nick Henshall (Michael McKell) starts a fire at Victoria Cottage and it spreads to surrounding buildings. Bob and Terry break into the shop to try to rescue Viv and the twins. Bob rescues Cathy and Heath and makes it out alive and Terry attempts to rescue Viv. The Post Office explodes and Terry and Viv are killed. Viv's funeral, agreed by Bob, Donna, Scott and Kelly, is held in Essex, off-screen.

In 2014, it is revealed that Viv knew that Donna had a daughter named April Windsor (Amelia Flanagan) after her split with Marlon, April's biological father, which stuns Bob. In November 2017, Rodney Blackstock (Patrick Mower) mentions Viv to Laurel on fireworks night saying Heath doesn't like fire after Viv's death.
