= List of Emmerdale characters introduced in 1996 =

The following is a list of characters that first appeared in the British soap opera Emmerdale in 1996, by order of first appearance.

== Sandra Fowler ==
Sandra Fowler
- Emmerdale character
- Portrayed by: Kate Layden
- Duration: 1996–1997
- First appearance: 4 January 1996
- Last appearance: 15 May 1997
- Introduced by: Mervyn Watson
In-universe information
- Sons: Biff Fowler

Sandra Fowler is the mother of Biff Fowler (Stuart Wade). She was played by Kate Layden. She was very disapproving of Biff's life in Emmerdale and tried to get him to come home with her when he was lodging with Seth Armstrong (Stan Richards) and Betty Eagleton (Paula Tilbrook). She also didn't like Biff's partner Linda Glover (Tonicha Jeronimo), and tried to stop them from getting married. When they exchanged vows, she stormed out of the church.

== Sean Rossi ==
Sean Rossi
- Emmerdale character
- Portrayed by: Mark Cameron
- Duration: 1996–1997
- First appearance: 22 February 1996
- Last appearance: 8 January 1997
- Introduced by: Mervyn Watson
In-universe information
- Occupation: Chef
- Daughters: Sarah Rossi

Sean Rossi, played by Mark Cameron, made his first appearance on 22 February 1996. Actor Paul Opacic originally auditioned for the role of Sean, before he was cast as Steve Marchant. Chris Hughes of the Daily Mirror observed "fast-talking chef Sean Rossi, is plainly a scheming rat." A reporter for The Guardian included Sean in a feature on soap characters that did not work. They wrote that he was a "beautiful man", but his biggest achievement was bringing an oyster knife to the village, while his brief relationship with Kathy Tate (Malandra Burrows) "caused even fewer ripples than the unwrapping of the oyster knife."

Sean is employed as a chef at The Old School Tearooms run by Kathy Tate. He and Kathy become friends and begin a relationship. When Kathy's brother Nick Bates (Cy Chadwick) kills poacher Jeremy "Jed" Connell (Ian Blower), Jed's brother Sidney Connell (Rodger Fox) begins terrorising Kathy and targets the tearooms. One night, Sean sees Sidney and pins him to his car and warns him to back off or he will kill him. Kathy ends their relationship when she learns that Sean had been in prison for knocking down and killing his daughter while he was drunk. Sean leaves the village, but returns a few months later after learning Kathy's husband Dave Glover (Ian Kelsey) has died. Sean tries to reconcile with Kathy, but she tells him to leave and he does.

== Susie Wilde ==
Susie Wilde
- Emmerdale character
- Portrayed by: Louise Heaney
- First appearance: 19 March 1996
- Last appearance: 17 October 1996
- Introduced by: Mervyn Watson
In-universe information
- Occupation: Hairdresser

Susie Wilde is the ex-girlfriend of Emma Nightingale (Rachel Ambler) who went on to have a relationship with Zoe Tate (Leah Bracknell). She was played by Louise Heaney. She arrived in Emmerdale after being thrown out by her girlfriend and moved in with Emma and Zoe. Emma was thrilled and welcomed her with open arms, but Zoe didn't warm to her juvenile habits. Susie managed to settle down in Emmerdale and tried to convince Alan Turner (Richard Thorp) for a job at The Woolpack. Zoe soon left Emma for Susie and they began a relationship, which ended when Susie had an affair with another woman and subsequently left the village.

== Steve Marchant ==
Steve Marchant, played by Paul Opacic, made his first appearance on 26 March 1996. Opacic originally auditioned for the role of Sean Rossi, but proved more suitable for the role of "shady dealer" Steve. He was initially contracted for six episodes. Steve was introduced as a former university friend of established regular Rachel Hughes (Glenda McKay). The character was written out in 1998 by series producer Kieran Roberts.

== Faye Clarke ==
Faye Clarke
- Emmerdale character
- Portrayed by: Helena Calvert
- First appearance: 30 July 1996
- Last appearance: 10 October 1996
- Introduced by: Mervyn Watson

Faye Clarke, played by Helena Calvert, made her first appearance on 30 July 1996. Shortly after her introduction, Faye was described as being a "Glamorous blonde" and a "brazen hussy" by Tony Purnell of the Daily Mirror. Another reporter for the paper called Faye "glamorous" and said that she was a "mini-skirted character". They added that Faye had become a favourite with male fans. Describing her first scenes, Purnell said Faye made her entrance in a flash sports car and then "showed off her bare midriff and prompted Terry from the Woolpack to describe her as the perfect woman." On 18 August 1996, it was announced that Calvert had chosen to leave Emmerdale. A Yorkshire TV spokesperson said "Millions of hearts will be broken, but her leaving won't mean things simmer down." Faye leaves her lover Steve Marchant (Paul Opacic) to go to the city.

== Granny Hopwood ==
Granny Hopwood
- Emmerdale character
- Portrayed by: Beatrice Kelly
- Appears on: 1 August 1996
- Introduced by: Mervyn Watson
In-universe information
- Sons: Billy Hopwood
- Grandsons: Andy Sugden; Daz Eden
- Other relatives: Sarah Sugden; Jack Sugden

Granny Hopwood, played by Beatrice Kelly, is the mother of Billy Hopwood (David Crellin) and grandmother of Andy Sugden (Kelvin Fletcher) and Daz Eden (Luke Tittensor). She is Andy's legal guardian for much his life prior to 1996, as his father, her son Billy is in and out of jail. They live in a run-down Tower Block of Flats in Leeds.

When Jack Sugden (Clive Hornby) brings Andy home, he is taken aback by Granny Hopwood's manner and living conditions. While smoking and drinking heavily, She tells him about Billy's imprisonment and wished that Andy would run away and never come back. Three weeks later, Andy tries to wake his grandmother but cannot. Jack initially believes Mrs Hopwood is drunk but when he arrives at the flat, he finds that she has died. Following her death, The Sugden family subsequently foster and adopt Andy.

== Jamie Tate ==
Jamie Tate
- Emmerdale character
- Portrayed by: Jake Meays (1996); Elliott Suckley (1996); Sam Silson (1997); Oliver Carroll (1997); Bradley White (1997–1999); Alexander Lincoln (2019–2021)
- Duration: 1996–1999, 2019–2021
- First appearance: Episode 2118; 24 September 1996
- Last appearance: Episode 9197; 4 November 2021
- Introduced by: Mervyn Watson (1996); Kate Brooks and Laura Shaw (2019)
In-universe information
- Other names: James Francis Tate
- Occupation: Veterinarian
- Father: Frank Tate
- Mother: Kim Tate
- Stepfather: Steve Marchant; Graham Foster; Will Taylor
- Half-brothers: Liam Hammond; Chris Tate; Caleb Miligan
- Half-sisters: Zoe Tate; Thea Ramsden
- Wife: Andrea Tate (until 2021)
- Sons: Thomas Tate
- Daughters: Millie Tate
- Nephews: Joe Tate; Noah Dingle; Nicky Miligan
- Nieces: Jean Tate

James Francis "Jamie" Tate made his first appearance on 24 September 1996. He was played by various child actors until his departure on 19 January 1999. The character was reintroduced in 2019, with Alexander Lincoln cast in the role which he played until 2021.

James is the only child of Frank Tate (Norman Bowler) from his marriage to Kim Tate (Claire King). His paternity is initially in doubt as Kim had been having an affair with Dave Glover (Ian Kelsey). Dave dies saving James from a fire before the paternity tests show Frank is the father. Kim expresses doubts about the tests, thinking that Frank's money means he could have paid for the test results to be altered; however, after Frank dies, Dave's father Ned Glover (Johnny Leeze) agrees to a second DNA test, which proves James is Frank's son. The following year, Kim marries Steve Marchant (Paul Opacic). They are involved in a hit and run accident while stealing a horse, and Kim pins the blame on Steve. She escapes with James in a helicopter to avoid being arrested. When Kim returns to the village without James after she spent six years in prison and sent him to boarding school. Kim asks her lover Graham Foster (Andrew Scarborough) to track down James as she needs him back in her life. Graham later gives her James' phone number, but she is forced to leave a voice message as James does not answer the phone.

Jamie returns to Emmerdale to attend an interview for a role at the Emmerdale Veterinary Centre. Jamie stops his Ford Mondeo to let Eric Pollard (Chris Chittell) cross when Megan Macey (Gaynor Faye) crashes her Volkswagen Golf into the back of him, pushing his Mondeo forward and running over Eric. Megan caused the accident as she was using her phone whilst driving. Eric sustains serious head injuries and is later found to have internal bleeding. Jamie has a major panic attack. Kim later arrives on the scene to find Jamie being treated in the back of an ambulance, telling the paramedics not to let her come. Rhona Goskirk (Zoë Henry) drives Kim to the hospital to see Jamie. Jamie refuses to see Kim and tells Rhona to stay wary of her. Kim steals his car keys so she can see more of him. Jamie later arrives at Home Farm to retrieve his keys from Kim, although she claims she does not have them. They go to The Woolpack to retrieve them from lost property although they are not there. Back at Home Farm, Kim tries to help Jamie piece together what happened. As Jamie confronts his mum about her past, Kim hands back his car keys, just as Graham shows up. He tells her they are finished. Jamie starts a custody battle for his daughter Millie and begins an affair with Belle Dingle (Eden Taylor-Draper). Jamie strikes Moira Dingle (Natalie J. Robb) with his car and leaves the scene. His estranged wife Andrea Tate (Anna Nightingale) learns what happened and blackmails him into breaking up with Belle. Later that year Belle turns against Jamie to work with Andrea to bring him down. Though Kim steps in and Belle and Andrea fail.

Jamie continues to work at the vets when they need a new receptionist after Belle's departure. They hire Dawn Taylor (Olivia Bromley). Jamie soon falls for her but his mother and her father, Will Taylor (Dean Andrews), disapprove of the relationship. They temporarily break up after Dawn's father makes them split up. Gabby Thomas (Rosie Bentham) and Jamie have sex whilst they are on a break and Gabby later reveals that she is pregnant to Jamie. Kim learns that Jamie has been poisoning her in order to get her fortune and she casts him out of her life. Gabby convinces Jamie that in order to get money for themselves and their forthcoming child, they should get married. Whilst on the way to elope with Gabby, Jamie swerves off the road to avoid Chas Dingle (Lucy Pargeter); his Jeep Cherokee goes into a nearby lake and his body is not located. The village believes that Jamie has died; however, he is later revealed to be living with his former mother-in-law Hazel (Kate Anthony). After Andrea's death, the two plot to regain custody of Millie, which they succeed with. Following the reveal that Jamie is alive, an Emmerdale spokesperson confirmed that Lincoln had left the soap and that producers had no plans to reintroduce him.

In 2021, Laura-Jayne Tyler from Inside Soap wrote that she was "rooting" for Jamie's relationship with Dawn, explaining "Their chemistry is proper Romeo & Juliet, true-love-thwarted-at-every-turn stuff...Plus, he's much less of a complete and utter tool when she's around."

== Tom Bainbridge ==
Tom Bainbridge
- Emmerdale character
- Portrayed by: Jeremy Turner-Welch
- Duration: 1996–1997
- First appearance: 8 October 1996
- Last appearance: 3 April 1997
- Introduced by: Mervyn Watson
In-universe information
- Occupation: Teacher

Tom Bainbridge was a teacher at Kelly Windsor's (Adele Silva) school. He was played by Jeremy Turner-Welch. He began an affair with 16-year-old Kelly when he was lodging with Betty Eagleton (Paula Tilbrook), who caught them on her settee. Kelly's father Vic Windsor (Alun Lewis) took a dislike to him as a result and tried to get him sacked, which did eventually happen in January 1997. As a result, Tom had to leave the village to find work elsewhere. Kelly decided against moving away from her family, so remained in Emmerdale.

== Sophie Wright ==
Sophie Wright
- Emmerdale character
- Portrayed by: Jane Cameron
- Duration: 1996–1997
- First appearance: 15 October 1996
- Last appearance: 26 November 1997
- Introduced by: Mervyn Watson
In-universe information
- Occupation: Nanny
- Mother: Jean Wright

Sophie Wright was hired by Frank Tate (Norman Bowler) as a nanny for his baby son James. She was played by Jane Cameron. After being hired, she began a relationship with Frank's daughter Zoe Tate (Leah Bracknell). Her appointment came as a surprise to James' mother Kim Tate (Claire King). At the New Years party, Sophie got drunk and had a one night stand with Butch Dingle (Paul Loughran), who began stalking her after she rejected him. His father Zak Dingle (Steve Halliwell) took a belt to him as a result. After developing a relationship with Zoe, she wanted to have a family with Sophie but Sophie felt a father needed to be involved and left Emmerdale after she felt that Zoe was bullying her into it.
