= List of Emmerdale characters introduced in 1995 =

Emmerdale is a British soap opera first broadcast on 16 October 1972. The following is a list of characters that first appeared during 1995, by order of first appearance. All characters are introduced by the series producer Mervyn Watson. Emma Nightingale and Nellie Dingle were introduced in January. Terry Woods, Britt Woods, and Sam Dingle made their debuts in February. Daniel Weir arrived in May, while June saw the birth of Joe Tate. Mandy Dingle began appearing from July, and Albert Dingle made his debut in December.

== Emma Nightingale ==
Emma Nightingale, portrayed by Rachel Ambler, made her first appearance on 19 January 1995. She is introduced as a love interest for Zoe Tate (Leah Bracknell), whom she later dates. Emma and Zoe share the soap opera's first lesbian kiss and have their relationship blessed more than a year after her arrival. Ambler left the soap in 1996 and reprised the role in 2004; Emma returns to the village where she surprises Zoe with flowers. She departed several weeks later.

== Nellie Dingle ==
Nellie Dingle
- Emmerdale character
- Portrayed by: Sandra Gough (1995); Maggie Tagney (2000)
- Duration: 1995, 2000
- First appearance: 24 January 1995
- Last appearance: 11 May 2000
- Introduced by: Mervyn Watson
In-universe information
- Father: Jimmy Lynch
- Sisters: Noola Lynch
- Husband: Zak Dingle (1970-1997)
- Sons: Nathan Dingle; Butch Dingle; Ben Dingle; Sam Dingle
- Daughters: Tina Dingle
- Grandsons: Samson Dingle; Vinny Dingle
- Granddaughters: Nell Dingle

Nellie Dingle, portrayed by Sandra Gough in 1995 and Maggie Tagney in 2000, makes her first appearance on 24 January 1995. Nellie is the first wife of Zak Dingle (Steve Halliwell) and the mother of their five children, Nathan Dingle, Ben Dingle (Steve Fury), Butch Dingle (Paul Loughran), Sam Dingle (James Hooton), and Tina Dingle (Jacqueline Pirie).

Nellie arrived in the village following the arrival of her family months previously. She left the village to care for her ill father in Ireland, and did not return. Nellie and Zak divorce in 1997 so that he can marry Lisa Clegg (Jane Cox). Nellie returns five years after her departure and attempts to woo back Zak. When Butch dies following a bus crash, Nellie is devastated and after his funeral, she returns to Ireland.

== Terry Woods ==
Terry Woods, played by Billy Hartman, made his first appearance on 2 February 1995.

== Britt Woods ==
Britt Woods
- Emmerdale character
- Portrayed by: Michelle Holmes
- First appearance: 2 February 1995
- Last appearance: 26 December 1995
- Introduced by: Mervyn Watson
In-universe information
- Father: Ronnie Slater
- Husband: Terry Woods (until 1995); Gerald Taylor (1996-present)
- Sons: Michael Taylor
- Stepsons: Tom Carter

Britt Woods, played by Michelle Holmes, made her first appearance on 2 February 1995. Holmes previously appeared in Emmerdale in 1992 as a love interest for Archie Brooks (Tony Pitts), Lindsey Carmichael, so she was already familiar with some of the cast and filming practices. Britt was introduced alongside her husband Terry Woods (Billy Hartman). They are employed as managers of The Woolpack pub. Holmes described her character as "a lively woman and she knows her own mind." She explained that Britt worked in bars in Lanzarote for a number of year, and she and Terry had also been working in Benidorm prior to their arrival in Emmerdale village. An Inside Soap writer compared the characters to Den Watts (Leslie Grantham) and Angie Watts (Anita Dobson) from fellow soap EastEnders, but noted that Terry and Britt "seem blissfully in love!"

== Sam Dingle ==
Sam Dingle, played by James Hooton, made his first appearance on 14 February 1995.

== Daniel Weir ==
Daniel Weir
- Emmerdale character
- Portrayed by: Matthew Marsden
- First appearance: 25 May 1995
- Last appearance: 5 October 1995
- Introduced by: Mervyn Watson
In-universe information
- Father: Thomas Weir
- Mother: Vanessa Weir

Daniel "Danny" Weir, played by Matthew Marsden, made his first appearance on 25 May 1995. Marsden auditioned for the role a week after signing with an agent, and it marked his acting break. He played the role for three months before producers decided to write the character out. Marsden commented, "Looking back, that was probably a good thing. I don't think I could have moved to Coronation Street if my Emmerdale role had been any more high profile than that – and he wasn't that likeable a character for the viewers in the first place." Ian Hyland of the Sunday Mirror dubbed Danny a "toffee-nosed rich kid".

Daniel has a relationship with Linda Glover (Tonicha Jeronimo), which their mothers' disapprove of. Linda breaks up with Daniel after learning that he has had an affair and is engaged to Libbis Foster-Cuthbert (Beatrice Aidin) and soon realises that she is pregnant. In retaliation, Linda's father, Ned (Johnny Leeze) storms the Weir mansion and attacks Danny and attempts to drown him in the swimming pool. Linda's brother, Dave (Ian Kelsey) arrives in time to stop Ned but after Danny's mother Vanessa (Fleur Chandler) insults Linda, Ned and Dave throw her into the pool, too. Linda loses the baby after ingesting some drugs she took from the veterinary surgery.

== Joe Tate ==
Joe Tate
- Emmerdale character
- Portrayed by: Oliver Young (1995–2005); Ned Porteous (2017–present)
- Duration: 1995–2005, 2017–2018, 2024–present
- First appearance: Episode 1980; 13 June 1995
- Introduced by: Mervyn Watson (1995); Iain MacLeod (2017); Laura Shaw and Sophie Roper (2024)
- Crossover appearances: Corriedale (2026)
In-universe information
- Other names: Tom Waterhouse; Joseph Mark Tate
- Occupation: Businessman
- Father: Chris Tate
- Mother: Rachel Hughes
- Adoptive father: Graham Foster
- Stepmother: Charity Dingle
- Half-brothers: Noah Dingle
- Sons: William Tate
- Grandfathers: Frank Tate; David Hughes
- Grandmothers: Jean Tate, Sr. Kate Sugden
- Uncles: Liam Hammond; Mark Hughes; Caleb Miligan; Jamie Tate
- Aunts: Zoe Tate
- First cousins: Jean Tate; Millie Tate; Thomas Tate; Nicky Miligan; Steph Miligan (adoptive)

Joseph "Joe" Tate (alias Tom Waterhouse), originally portrayed by Oliver Young, was born on 8 June 1995 and made his first appearance in the following episode. He is the son of Chris Tate (Peter Amory) and Rachel Hughes (Glenda McKay). He continued to appear on a recurring basis until 22 September 2005, when the character departed. On 13 September 2017, Ned Porteous joined the cast as businessman Tom Waterhouse, who was later revealed to be Joseph on 4 January 2018. Joe was seemingly killed off on 11 October 2018 but on 18 March 2019 he was revealed to be alive and living abroad. Joe made a surprise return on 24 December 2024.

Joseph is born prematurely to parents Chris and Rachel, and named after Rachel's former stepfather Joe Sugden (Frazer Hines) and Rachel's brother Mark Hughes (Craig McKay). Since Chris and his dad Frank Tate (Norman Bowler) are away in a meeting when Rachel goes into labour, Chris's former wife Kathy Tate (Malandra Burrows) helps Rachel and becomes Joseph's godmother. When Chris and Rachel divorce, Rachel obtains custody of Joseph. The following year, Rachel begins a relationship with Graham Clark (Kevin Pallister), who later murders her by pushing her off a cliff. Joseph begins living with Chris, although when Chris marries Charity Dingle (Emma Atkins), Joseph opts to attend boarding school. Two years later, Chris commits suicide, framing Charity for his murder and leaving Joseph an orphan. Zoe Tate (Leah Bracknell), Chris' sister, obtains custody of Joseph and in 2005, they leave the village with Zoe's daughter, Jean Tate (Megan Pearson).

Joseph continues to attend boarding school in England where he becomes friends with groundskeeper Graham Foster (Andrew Scarborough) and saves him from a fire. At the age of 15 Joseph locks his headmaster in a cupboard as a prank and Zoe makes Graham Joseph's guardian to prevent him being expelled. On leaving school Joseph starts his own business with Graham as his associate.

Twelve years after leaving the village, Joseph returns to Emmerdale, using the alias Tom Waterhouse. He meets Debbie Dingle about leasing a Bentley. Tom and Debbie later kiss and sleep together, he then buys her a Bentley and a house, Jacob's Fold. They begin a relationship. Debbie soon discovers that Tom has invested in a golf course that is to be built on the land that the Dingles' cottage, Wishing Well, is built on. Joseph reveals his true identity, takes back the Bentley, evicts Debbie and her children, Sarah and Jack Sugden, out of Jacob's Fold and ends his relationship with Debbie, telling her that she was collateral damage in his pursuit of seeking revenge on her mother, Charity, for driving his father, Chris, to suicide. Joseph buys his childhood home, Home Farm, from the Whites and later moves into it. He makes up with Debbie and starts a relationship with his brother Noah Dingle.

On 13 September 2017, it was announced that Porteous had been cast as Tom Waterhouse, a love interest for Debbie. Tom is billed as a "wealthy businessman", while Porteous described the character as "very cool and fun", the actor admitted he found his casting enjoyable but intimidating. On 4 January 2018, Tom was revealed to be Joseph Tate in a surprise on-screen twist which revealed that Joseph had returned to take revenge on Charity, blaming her for his father, Chris' death.

On 11 October 2018, Joe is seemingly killed after a single punch by Debbie's father, Cain Dingle (Jeff Hordley). However, when Graham puts Joe in the boot of his car, Joe's hand twitches. Graham is then seen emotionally breaking down at the wheel of his car. Graham later confirms to his step-grandmother Kim Tate (Claire King) that Joe has been taken care of, and Joe was assumed to be dead. However, on 18 March 2019 Joe was revealed to be alive and living abroad, in Monte Carlo, living off money from Kim's business.

Joe's supposed death came in fourth place in the "Biggest OMG Soap moment" category and in sixth place in the "Most devastating Soap Death" category at the 2018 Digital Spy Reader Awards.

== Mandy Dingle ==
Mandy Dingle, played by Lisa Riley, made her first appearance on 20 July 1995. Mandy arrives in the village for her cousin Tina Dingle's (Jacqueline Pirie) wedding to Luke McAllister (Noah Huntley). The character was popular with viewers, so producers invited Riley to return as a full-time cast member the following year.

== Albert Dingle ==
Albert Dingle
- Emmerdale character
- Portrayed by: Bobby Knutt
- Duration: 1995–1997, 2004
- First appearance: 21 December 1995
- Last appearance: 21 October 2004
- Introduced by: Mervyn Watson (1995); Steve Frost (2004)
In-universe information
- Occupation: Mechanic
- Father: Jedediah Dingle
- Mother: Peg Dingle
- Brothers: Shadrach Dingle; Zak Dingle; Caleb Dingle; Ezra Dingle
- Wife: Delilah Dingle (until 1994)
- Sons: Marlon Dingle; Eli Dingle
- Grandsons: Leo Goskirk
- Granddaughters: April Windsor

Albert Dingle, played by Bobby Knutt, made his first appearance on 21 December 1995. Knutt left the role in 1997 to continue his career as a stand-up comedian. He made a brief reappearance in 2004.

Upon his first appearance on the show, he had been in prison for armed robbery. Albert is sent to prison for stealing Eric Pollard's (Chris Chittell) car and is released months later. Albert welcomes the arrival of his son, Marlon (Mark Charnock), but also welcomes the arrival of Lisa Clegg (Jane Cox). Albert begins wooing Lisa but discovers that his brother Zak (Steve Halliwell) also has feelings for her. However, when Zak fails to put up a fight for her, Lisa decides to marry Albert, despite her feelings for Zak. On Albert and Lisa's wedding day, her ex-husband, Barry Clegg (Bernard Wrigley), tries to stop the wedding. Although Barry is manhandled and removed from the church, Zak arrives and announces his love for Lisa. While Albert initially fights Zak, he runs away when the police arrive looking for him over an armed robbery. Seeing Albert for who he is, Lisa marries Zak. Albert is arrested a few days later and sent to prison.

Upon his release, Albert returns to work at the local garage but continues his criminal activities. He takes money from the garage till, assists Billy Hopwood (David Crellin) in an armed robbery and cons Zak and Lisa out of £100. After he builds up debts with a crooked businessman, Albert persuades his nephew, Sam (James Hooton), to assist him in an armed robbery. However, the police arrive and Albert escapes with the money but Sam is caught and arrested. Albert stashes the money and manages to hide the fact that he was the true culprit from his family. However Butch Dingle (Paul Loughran) finds the stolen money and confronts Albert with Zak. They threaten him with violence and force him to confess to the crime. Albert is arrested for the crime and disowned by his family and he and Sam are sent down for armed robbery. They are both released two years later but Albert does not make an appearance upon his return.
