= Zak Dingle =

Fictional character from Emmerdale

- Emmerdale character
- Portrayed by: Steve Halliwell
- Duration: 1994–2023
- First appearance: Episode 1914; 20 October 1994
- Last appearance: Episode 9714; 27 June 2023
- Introduced by: Keith Richardson
- Spin-off appearances: Emmerdale: The Dingles Down Under (1997); The Dingles in Venice (1999); The Dingles for Richer for Poorer (2010)
In-universe information
- Occupation: Handyman; Pig farmer
- Father: Jedediah Dingle
- Mother: Peg Dingle
- Brothers: Shadrach Dingle; Albert Dingle; Caleb Dingle; Ezra Dingle; Zebediah Dingle
- Wife: Nellie Dingle (until 1997); Lisa Clegg (1998–2016, 2019); Joanie Wright (2016–2017)
- Sons: Nathan Dingle; Butch Dingle; Ben Dingle; Cain Dingle; Sam Dingle
- Daughters: Tina Dingle; Belle Dingle
- Grandsons: Nate Robinson; Vinny Dingle; Samson Dingle; Kyle Dingle; Isaac Dingle
- Granddaughters: Debbie Dingle
- Grandfathers: Jonah Dingle
- Grandmothers: Dot Dingle
- Uncles: Bert Dingle
- Aunts: Maud Dingle
- Nephews: Marlon Dingle; Eli Dingle
- Nieces: Mandy Dingle; Chas Dingle; Lilith Dingle; Del Dingle; Gennie Walker
- First cousins: Obadiah Dingle; Solomon Dingle; Elvis Dingle
- Other relatives: Charity Dingle; Noah Dingle; Marilyn Dingle; Sarah Sugden; Jack Sugden; Aaron Dingle; Moses Dingle; Leo Goskirk; April Windsor; Molly Sharma; Matthew Dingle; Mark Dingle; Luke Dingle; Jon Dingle; Eve Dingle

Zachariah Bartholomew "Zak" Dingle is a fictional character from the British soap opera Emmerdale, played by Steve Halliwell. He first appeared on 20 October 1994. Halliwell initially joined the show as part of the Dingle family and was only initially supposed to appear for a few episodes, but has become a key part of the soap since his introduction. He has been nominated for several awards for his portrayal of Zak. Some of Zak's storylines have included his wife Nellie (Sandra Gough) divorcing him in 1997, marrying Lisa Clegg (Jane Cox) in 1998, having a daughter, Belle (Emily Mather; Eden Taylor-Draper) in 1998, the death of his son, Butch (Paul Loughran) in 2000, Lisa being raped in 2011, assaulting his son Cain (Jeff Hordley) and leaving him temporarily paralysed in 2011, suffering a mental breakdown in 2012, trying to control his rebellious daughter and dealing with the death of Lisa. Halliwell died on 15 December 2023, with Zak having made his final appearance on 27 June 2023. On 2 July 2024, it was announced that Zak would be killed off in the programme with a funeral as a tribute to Halliwell. His death was revealed on 15 October 2024.

== Casting ==
Steve Halliwell joined Emmerdale as Zak in September 1994. He explained that Zak was brought in to fight Ned Glover (Johnny Leeze), whom he lashed out at following the death of his son Ben. Halliwell revealed that he was only supposed to be in the show for two episodes, but he tried to "make a mark" and hoped that he would be asked back. Zak was introduced along with the rest of the Dingle family to "run riot through the rural tranquillity and put the muck back into the mix". The family were initially planned to be "nothing more than a bit of spot of bother over a couple of episodes." The Dingles celebrated their ten year anniversary in 2005.

In 2003, it was announced Halliwell was to take a break. This led him to comment that he had "no axe to grind" and it was not "about salary or storylines" and added "I love Zak, I love Emmerdale, but I've asked for a spell out to spend some quality time with my family and friends". In 2010, Halliwell said that his casting in Emmerdale was "the greatest break in my professional life". In September 2018 Halliwell had to take five months off from Emmerdale for health reasons, which he later revealed was due to having heart surgery. Halliwell returned to play Zak on 13 May 2019. Halliwell then left again in October 2019 with a storyline where he leaves to help Debbie in Scotland. Due to return sometime in 2020, Halliwell’s return to filming was delayed by the COVID-19 pandemic. Zak made his first reappearance alongside relative Debbie Dingle (Charley Webb) in the episode first broadcast in the United Kingdom on 18 January 2021. Zak made his final appearance on 27 June 2023, and Halliwell, who never officially exited the show, died six months later.

On 2 July 2024, it was announced that Zak was to be killed off within the series. Emmerdale producer, Sophie Roper confirmed that Zak was to receive a funeral service. Roper told Radio Times, "The Dingles have been at the heart of our show for 30 years now and will continue to be so. And as many of you will know, of course, we lost Steve recently... So we're going to be marking Zak's passing, [the] iconic Zak Dingle character, in the coming months with a Dingle funeral. [It will be] so very difficult for a lot of people who work on the show and, obviously, for a lot of our viewers who have grown and loved Zak for many, many years. But it will be a hugely fitting tribute to such an iconic character coming up."

== Characterisation ==
ITV described him as the "patriarch" of the Dingle family, adding he is "ostensibly a scrap dealer and pig farmer" although he spends "most of his time either doing nothing at all, or dreaming up scams and schemes". They also labelled him as occasionally being "a violent man" who is "prone to jealousy, however, he will do anything for a quiet life and a pint in the Woolpack!" Halliwell said that Zak was "brought in as a violent nutter, then after they introduced the rest of the family, this workshy, loveable rogue started to emerge, and they started writing more comic elements for the Dingles". Halliwell described the family saying they are "petty thieves" and "a bit part of the under class of life" who "still hold those old values that people are more important than money". He added that "[The Dingles] do strike a chord with a lot of people. Most of us will never be rich, so they can identify with the Dingles much easier than rich characters". What's on TV described him as a "General dodgy dealer" who is an "all round wrong 'un" and the "keeper of the 'Dingle code' – which basically means that he makes sure all Dingles live on the wrong side of the law". Holy Soap described him as "head of the Dingle clan, Zak is the scallywag you can't help but have a soft spot for" before adding that he "has had several odd jobs over the years, but he tends to fill his coffers by masterminding several dodgy deals with his brother, Shadrach (Andy Devine)."

== Storylines ==
Zak arrives in the village in October 1994 and immediately challenges old bare-knuckle boxing adversary Ned Glover (Johnny Leeze) to a bare-knuckle fight, which he goes on to lose. Zak's family start a feud with the McAllister family over the death of his son, Ben (Steve Fury), following a fight with Luke McAllister (Noah Huntley) two months earlier. Despite discovering that Ben died as a result of a heart defect, the Dingles still blame Luke and force the family, except Luke, to leave the village. He is enraged to discover his daughter, Tina (Jacqueline Pirie) is in a relationship with Luke and attacks him until Tina tells him she is expecting Luke's baby. The truth is revealed when Tina humiliates Luke at the altar and tells him that there is no baby, in revenge for Ben's death. After Luke is killed in a car crash in August 1995, just seconds after Tina had jumped from the car, the Dingles and McAllisters put the feud aside. Zak's wife, Nellie (Sandra Gough) attends to her sick father, Jimmy in Ireland but does not return.

Lisa Clegg (Jane Cox) enters Zak's life and they begin a relationship, and despite a few hiccups, they eventually marry. Lisa gives birth to a daughter, Belle (Emily Mather) at Christmas 1998, which is a shock as she did not know she was pregnant. Zak's and Lisa's happiness is tested when Nellie (now Maggie Tagney) returns and tries to win Zak back but is unsuccessful. When a bus crashes in the village, Butch is injured and his condition rapidly deteriorates and he dies, leaving Zak devastated at the second death of one of his sons. Fresh trauma comes when Zak learns Lisa worked on the bus's engine before it was roadworthy, leading to Zak blaming her for his son's death for a while but he eventually relents. Zak reveals to Cain (Jeff Hordley) that he is his real father as the result of an affair with Cain's mother, Faith (Gillian Jephcott; Sally Dexter). After some violent words, the two men accept the situation and a bond develops between them.

In 2001, Zak discovers he has testicular cancer, confiding in long-time friend Seth Armstrong (Stan Richards), although Seth originally gets the wrong idea. Zak decides to not get treatment but Seth, his son Sam (James Hooton) and nephew Marlon (Mark Charnock) kidnap him and force him to come to his senses, he goes to hospital. As soon as he recovers, domestic harmony is shattered when his elderly mother, Peg (Jeanne Hepple), comes to stay. Zak blames Peg for the death of his father, Jed (Richard Mayes), believing she murdered him but when she reveals that Jed deserted them, they declare a truce. Zak later tracks down a dying Jed, who tells him of a fortune in Chile. Zak leaves to find the fortune, much to the shock of his family and in his absence, Lisa becomes close to Eddie Hope but realizes she still loves Zak and they reconcile on his return. Zak attacks Andy Sugden (Kelvin Fletcher) when he learns he is having an affair with his granddaughter Debbie (Charley Webb). When Debbie gives birth to a daughter, Sarah, Zak and Lisa help Debbie but she gives Sarah to Emily Kirk (Kate McGregor) as she is not ready to be a mother. Zak's youngest son, Sam (James Hooton), returns with his fiance, Alice Wilson (Ursula Holden-Gill) and they are expecting a child. Sam and Alice marry but Alice develops cancer and dies shortly after their son, Samson (Bradley Milnes) is born. Zak and the family rally round to help Sam.

Zak strikes up a friendship with Rosemary King (Linda Thorson). He takes her at face value, despite her being devious and manipulative. They get on and she asks him to keep a discreet eye on her son, Grayson Sinclair (Christopher Villiers), and let her know what he is doing. She hires him as gamekeeper at Home Farm and confided family secrets, knowing she could trust him. Rosemary bonds with Belle and pays for her to attend private school but Zak cuts this associate short when he learns Rosemary has been poisoning her daughter-in-law Perdita Hyde-Sinclair (Georgia Slowe).

When Cain is viciously attacked in December 2011, Zak is very uncomfortable to the extent he refuses to visit him in hospital. He later reveals himself to Cain as his attacker when he discovers Cain is trying to get Jai Sharma (Chris Bisson) falsely imprisoned for the crime. Zak also confesses to Lisa and prepares hand himself in, but Cain keeps his father's involvement in the attack secret, and retracts his statement against Jai. Zak's guilt weighs heavily on him and disappears for long periods of time and begins drinking heavily. He takes Samson (now Sam Hall) poaching one day and accidentally leaves his phone in the van. Lisa and Sam are frantic with worry. Zak and Samson are later found by Megan Macey (Gaynor Faye), who calls Sam and he arrives to collect Samson and warns Zak to stay away from him. A few weeks later, a scan reveals some abnormalities in Zak's body, he is referred to a consultant to have some more scans. At the appointment with the radiologist, the doctor warns Zak that in the abnormalities could be pancreatic cancer, but also could be a simple curable form of the flu. However, an appointment later reveals that Zak does not have pancreatic cancer.

Zak begins to act erratically and becomes paranoid, he is told by a vet that his chickens are healthy but, in his paranoia, and belief that there is something wrong, he kills them. He later starts believing he has cancer again and talks to a doctor about it, the doctor tells him he does not have cancer but Zak refuses to believe it and tells his family that he has cancer. It later becomes apparent that Zak has suffered a nervous breakdown and is later sectioned.

On Christmas Day 2015, Belle reveals to Lisa that she'd seen Zak having an affair with their lodger Joanie Wright (Denise Black). Lisa is heartbroken by the news, and her and Zak separate. This separation effectively severs Zak's ties to the rest of the family, who convene at Wishing Well Cottage and decide to "excommunicate" Zak from the Dingles. Zak and Joanie then move in with the biological grandmother of Joanie's adoptive grandson Kyle, Kerry.

Early in 2016, Zak tries to regain the attention of his estranged family, especially after they all begin to act rather out of character. Zak becomes determined to know what's going on, and he pesters Sam and Belle in the village shop to tell him the secret they're supposedly hiding. The two initially try to keep it together, but, pushed to her limit, Belle blurts out that Zak's great-nephew Aaron Livesy (Danny Miller) was raped as a child by his father Gordon. Much like the rest of the family, Zak is devastated by the news, and Joanie begins to question his loyalties.

After Joanie accepts Zak's proposal of marriage, they quickly plan their wedding and during the stag do put together at The Woolpack, Zak drinks too much and mistakenly calls Joanie 'Lisa' which causes her to panic and get cold feet. On the day of the wedding Zak is upset after thinking that Joanie has jilted him, however she arrives at the church late and they are eventually married.

Despite his commitment to Joanie, Zak still remains close to Lisa causing Joanie and him to argue constantly. On Christmas Day, Joanie splits up with Zak due to his unresolved feelings for Lisa and he tries to reconcile with Lisa, who rejects him. When Joanie dies suddenly after being released from prison, Lisa comforts Zak in his grief and she accepts him.

Lisa and Zak then get back together and in early 2018 Lisa, Zak and the Dingles protest to save their house from being torn down by Joe Tate. In May 2018 Lisa and Zak's relationship take a turn and Lisa tells Zak she has got a job offer in Scotland and has been called up to work there for a few months. In September it's revealed that Lisa is now travelling overseas and Zak offers to go with her so he leaves.

In early 2019, it is revealed that Lisa has a deathly heart condition and has not got long left to live. Lisa then tells Charity that Zak can barely cope with the news and that she does not want Charity to tell anybody yet. Zak asked Lisa to marry him and after only two days of planning they married on 23 May 2019 in the church. Before the wedding, the Dingle's pigs escaped from their pen and were rounded up by Cain, Belle and Lisa in their wedding outfits causing Lisa's dress to become covered in mud. After the wedding, celebrations were held in the pub and Lisa went home to get changed as she did not want her wedding photos to be of her covered in mud. Zak went to find her and found her asleep on the sofa but when he tried to wake her up he realised that she had died.

== Reception ==
At the British Soap Awards in 2002, Halliwell was nominated for Best Actor for his portrayal of the part, and Zak was nominated for Hero for his testicular cancer storyline. In 2007 he was again nominated for Best Actor. In a poll to find the "top soap bloke" of all time which was run by Loaded, Zak came fourth. The character was selected as one of the "top 100 British soap characters" by industry experts for a poll to be run by What's on TV, with readers able to vote for their favourite character to discover "Who is Soap's greatest Legend?" Fellow Emmerdale cast member James Hooton commented that said Steve Halliwell often gets recognised for his alter ego saying "Steve can't tie his shoelaces in the street without people noticing. It's the beard". A writer from Holy Soap named Zak's most memorable moment as being his introduction into the series; challenging Bernard McAllister to a bare knuckle fight.
