= List of Emmerdale characters introduced in 1994 =

The following is a list of characters that first appeared in the British soap opera Emmerdale in 1994, by order of first appearance.

== Dolores Sharp ==
Dolores Sharp
- Emmerdale character
- Portrayed by: Samantha Hurst
- Duration: 1994–1995
- First appearance: 3 March 1994
- Last appearance: 21 November 1995
- Introduced by: Mervyn Watson

Dolores Sharp was introduced as a school friend of Luke McAllister whom she first met when he defended her from some bullies. She then introduced Luke to her boyfriend, Biff Fowler, and Luke's sister, Jessica. While in the village, Dolores's storylines involved being in a motorcycle accident in October 1994, not causing herself much harm, but leaving Luke unconscious, and being a bridesmaid at Luke's wedding to Tina Dingle in July 1995. However, Tina jilted Luke at the altar and revealed that she was getting revenge for his involvement in the death of her older brother Ben. Luke later died in a van explosion the next month. Dolores was last seen in November 1995.

== Eileen Pollock ==
Eileen Pollock
- Emmerdale character
- Portrayed by: Arbel Jones
- First appearance: 24 March 1994
- Last appearance: 30 June 1994
- Introduced by: Mervyn Watson
In-universe information
- Husband: Eric Pollard (until 1994)
- Sons: Edward Pollock

Eileen Pollock is the first wife of Eric Pollard (Chris Chittell). She arrives in Emmerdale after reading about the Emmerdale plane crash and the death of Eric's second wife Elizabeth Feldmann (Kate Dove). She threatens to expose Eric as a bigamist until he pays her off for a divorce. She then leaves the village and they divorce after 30 years of marriage, although they have only been together for a short amount of time during the marriage itself.

In November 2018, Eric reveals to Chas Dingle (Lucy Pargeter) that he and Eileen parted ways after their son, Edward, was born stillborn in 1978. The grief of their loss led to them leading separate lives, and ultimately Eric abandoning Eileen, changing his name and not seeing her again until 1994. He advises Chas to not let her and her partner Paddy Kirk (Dominic Brunt) drift apart like he and Eileen did after their newborn baby dies.

== Reg Dawson ==
Reg Dawson
- Emmerdale character
- Portrayed by: Niven Boyd
- First appearance: 5 May 1994
- Last appearance: 7 June 1994
- Introduced by: Mervyn Watson
In-universe information
- Wife: Viv Dawson (1978–1983)
- Sons: Scott Windsor
- Granddaughters: Jean Tate

Reg Dawson is the first husband of Viv Windsor (Deena Payne) and father of Scott Windsor (Toby Cockerell). He first appeared on 5 May 1994.

Reg, who abandoned Scott and Viv early in Scott's life, arrives in Emmerdale to see Scott after serving time in prison. His stay causes friction with Vic (Alun Lewis), Viv's current husband after Reg declares that he is going to get Viv and Scott back. Reg eventually leaves. Several days later, Reg and his gang commit an armed robbery on the post office and take Viv and Shirley Turner (Rachel Davies) hostage at Home Farm. The situation worsens when Reg shoots and kills one of his henchmen Simmy (Stuart St. Paul), mistaking him for a police officer. Later into the siege, Viv argues with Reg and he is about to shoot her when Shirley jumps in the way of the gun and takes the bullet and dies instantly. Viv then tries to get Reg to give himself up and tells him she will say Shirley's death is an accident. Reg, realising there is no way out, plans for him and Viv to die together in a suicide pact. Before this can happen, a police marksman shoots Reg dead. In his will, he leaves Viv several thousand pounds, but a stipulation said she had to leave her current husband, to receive the money. She declines and stays with Vic.

== Ned Glover ==
Ned Glover
- Emmerdale character
- Portrayed by: Johnny Leeze
- Duration: 1994–2000
- First appearance: 2 August 1994
- Last appearance: 2 August 2000
- Introduced by: Mervyn Watson (1994); Kieran Roberts (2000)
In-universe information
- Other names: Edward Glover
- Occupation: Farmhand; Businessman
- Wife: Jan Glover (until 1999)
- Sons: Dave Glover; Roy Glover
- Daughters: Linda Fowler

Ned Glover, played by Johnny Leeze, made his first appearance on 2 August 1994. The character and Leeze's casting was confirmed the previous month. Ned is introduced to the show along with his wife Jan Glover (Roberta Kerr) and their three children: Dave (Ian Kelsey), Linda (Tonicha Jeronimo), and Roy (Nicky Evans). New producer Mervyn Watson hoped the family would boost ratings, as the show experienced "an exodus" of cast members at the same time. Ned and Jan are tenant farmers, who are evicted from their home. Ned wins a caravan while bare knuckle fighting and receives permission from the Sugden family to live on their land. Ken Irwin of the Daily Mirror said Leeze was "thrilled" to join the cast and was "enthusiastic" about his character. Leeze stated "Ned Glover is a hard-working farmer who has lost his farm and is living with his family in a caravan. He'll be glad of a job on Jack Sugden's farm." He departed in 1999, before returning for a brief stint in 2000.

Ned had known the Sugden family for years and helps them out on their farm, indicating that he had lived in the village before. Ned is challenged by his old adversary Zak Dingle (Steve Halliwell) to a bare-knuckle fist fight and wins. Dave dies in a fire at Home Farm and Linda in a car crash the following year. This causes his marriage to break down and Jan leaves the village after she and Ned break up. Ned follows a year later to run a bar in Ibiza with an old girlfriend, Dawn Wilkins (Rosy Clayton). Ned comes back to the village to offer Roy and his wife Kelly Windsor (Adele Silva) the chance to live with him. Roy agrees to think about it and Ned returns to Ibiza. Roy joins him a few weeks later after ending his marriage to Kelly at the airport.

== Jan Glover ==
Jan Glover
- Emmerdale character
- Portrayed by: Roberta Kerr
- Duration: 1994–1998
- First appearance: 4 August 1994
- Last appearance: 12 May 1998
- Introduced by: Mervyn Watson
In-universe information
- Sisters: June Worrel
- Husband: Ned Glover (until 1999)
- Sons: Dave Glover; Roy Glover
- Daughters: Linda Fowler

Jan Glover (also Worrel) first appeared in August 1994 with her husband Ned and their children. Jan had married Ned in 1971 and the couple had three children: Dave, in 1973, Linda, in 1978 and Roy, in 1980. Jan worked as a barmaid at the Woolpack pub. She was devastated by the deaths of two of her children: Dave in a fire at Home Farm during Christmas 1996 and Linda in a car crash in October 1997. Jan suffered a nervous breakdown after this and abducted James Tate, blaming James' mother Kim for her children's deaths. Jan is sectioned but later discharged and returns home. However her actions put strain on her marriage and when Jan realises that Ned no longer trusts her, the couple separate. Jan leaves the village to live with her sister, June Worrel, for a fresh start.

== Ben Dingle ==
Ben Dingle
- Emmerdale character
- Portrayed by: Steve Fury
- Appears on: 9 August 1994
- Introduced by: Mervyn Watson
In-universe information
- Father: Zak Dingle
- Mother: Nellie Dingle
- Brothers: Nathan Dingle; Butch Dingle; Sam Dingle
- Sisters: Tina Dingle
- Half-brothers: Cain Dingle
- Half-sisters: Belle Dingle
- Grandfathers: Jedediah Dingle; Jimmy Lynch
- Grandmothers: Peg Dingle

Benedict Alan "Ben" Dingle, played by Steve Fury, appeared on 9 August 1994. Ben was the first member of the Dingle family to be introduced. He is the son of Zak Dingle (Steve Halliwell) and Nellie Dingle (Sandra Gough). Ben comes to the village to attend a rave. He almost hits Dave Glover (Ian Kelsey) with his car and then gets into a fight with Luke McAllister (Noah Huntley) and Biff Fowler (Stuart Wade). The fight becomes physical and Luke punches Ben, who then collapses and later dies. His cause of death is inhalation of blood, but it is later determined that he died of a heart defect. His family refuses to accept this and they continuously blame Luke.

== Butch Dingle ==
Butch Dingle
- Emmerdale character
- Portrayed by: Paul Loughran
- Duration: 1994–2000
- First appearance: 30 August 1994
- Last appearance: 24 March 2000
- Introduced by: Mervyn Watson
- Spin-off appearances: Emmerdale: The Dingles; Down Under (1997); Emmerdale: Don't Look Now! The Dingles in Venice (1999)
In-universe information
- Other names: Francis Albert Dingle
- Family: Dingle
- Father: Zak Dingle
- Mother: Nellie Dingle
- Stepmother: Lisa Dingle
- Brothers: Nathan Dingle; Ben Dingle; Sam Dingle
- Sisters: Tina Dingle
- Half-brothers: Cain Dingle
- Half-sisters: Belle Dingle
- Wife: Mandy Dingle (1998–1999); Emily Wylie (2000)
- Grandfathers: Jedediah Dingle; Jimmy Lynch
- Grandmothers: Peg Dingle
- Uncles: Albert Dingle; Ezra Dingle
- First cousins: Marlon Dingle; Mandy Dingle; Chas Dingle
- Other relatives: Charity Dingle

Francis "Butch" Dingle, played by Paul Loughran, arrived in the village in August 1994 to confront Luke McAllister (Noah Huntley), who Butch believed was responsible for the death of his brother Ben (Steve Fury). Butch caused trouble for Luke for the remainder of the year in revenge.

Butch got his nickname because at six years old he had come home from school with some flowers which he wanted to dry and press in a book. His father Zak (Steve Halliwell) was concerned that his son was too sensitive so he started calling him "Butch" in an attempt to get him to behave more like a man. As a result of this, Butch felt he was unable to develop as a person properly and unable to express his true feelings and he became a bully and troublemaker during his early years on the show.

However, he mellowed as the years went by around in late 1995 or early 1996 and lost his virginity to nanny Sophie Wright (Jane Cameron) when they were drunk at New Year 1996/1997. Butch later began stalking Sophie as he couldn't handle her rejection. Butch also had an obsession with his cousin Mandy Dingle (Lisa Riley). In November 1998, he married Mandy but she only went through with it for financial gain and not because she loved him. Butch felt himself in love with her and was sad that his feelings were not reciprocated. Butch later divorced Mandy and fell in love with Emily Wylie (Kate McGregor). Emily and Butch had a lot in common and both considered themselves to be misfits. Emily decided to stay in Emmerdale with Butch rather than leave the village with her father.

Butch died in hospital of injuries sustained in the bus crash on 24 March 2000. Butch had been a passenger in the community bus when it was hit by an out-of-control lorry driven by Pete Collins (Kirk Smith). Before dying, Butch married Emily on his death bed. Butch was buried next to his brother, Ben, who died nearly six years earlier. The epitaph on their tombstone is 'Dead but still Dingles'.

NB: In a continuity error, whilst reminiscing after Zak's funeral in 2024, Sam Dingle stated that Butch's real name was Seth.

== Harry Barker ==
Harry Barker
- Emmerdale character
- Portrayed by: Harry Beety
- Appears on: 22 December 1994
- Introduced by: Mervyn Watson
In-universe information
- Nieces: Kim Tate
- Other relatives: Jamie Tate

Harry Barker is the uncle of Kim Tate who arrives in the village on her wedding day to Frank Tate to give her away.

He strikes up a friendship with Seth Armstrong and Zoe Tate. He gets drunk in the build-up to the ceremony, and the wedding party soon realize that he is withholding something. After nearly collapsing, he tells Kim that he is nervous about giving her away and admits that he is too drunk to do it. Seth then decides to give her away instead, and Harry watches on at the church as Frank and Kim remarry, although Frank is confused as to why Harry was not walking Kim down the aisle.

He leaves Emmerdale shortly afterwards, and does not attend Kim's 'funeral' in 1997.

== Tina Dingle ==
Tina Dingle, played by Jacqueline Pirie, made her first appearance on 29 December 1994. She is the youngest child of Zak (Steve Halliwell) and Nellie Dingle (Sandra Gough/Maggie Tagney). She arrived in the village a few months after her family. Her most famous storyline was in July 1995 when she was going to marry Luke McAllister (Noah Huntley), claiming to be pregnant with his child. However, this proved to be fake, to get revenge for the death of her brother, Ben (Steve Fury), the year before. 1996 saw Tina caught in a love triangle with Frank Tate (Norman Bowler) and Steve Marchant (Paul Opacic). Pirie quit her role that same year as she was expecting her first child, and her final scenes aired on 24 December 1996. On 17 October 2024, Tina made an unannounced return to Emmerdale for her father's funeral with the role was recast to Brassic star Samantha Power. This was part of the Dingles' 30th year in the soap. Tina's return is only a guest appearance, but Power added that "Tina is just fantastic to play so I would love the opportunity to come back and cause more mischief".

== Others ==
Character	Date(s)	Actor	Circumstances
Danny	11 January – 3 May	Lauren Beales	Jessica McAllister's (Camilla Power) boyfriend. Danny is not very popular with Jessicca's parents, even after he asks her to marry him. Jessica eventually gets bored with Danny, especially when Biff Fowler came on the scene.
Lucy	21–26 April (2 episodes)	Tracie Hart	Lucy is Viv Windsor's (Deena Payne) sister who arrives for a visit. She informs Viv of her ex-husband Reg Dawson's (Niven Boyd) release from prison and intentions to see their son, Scott (Toby Cockerell). Lucy admits that she let Reg know of Viv and Scott's whereabouts after he was worried about them following the plane crash several months earlier. Lucy then returns to Essex.
Colin Long	24 May – 22 September (6 episodes)	Al Hunter-Ashton	Colin is a member of Reg Dawson's (Niven Boyd) gang who helps him rob his ex-wife Viv Windsor's (Deena Payne) post office and take her and Shirley Turner (Rachel Davies) hostage up at home farm, resulting in a stand-off with the police. After Reg shoots Shirley, Colin tells Viv to flee but she refuses, so he gives himself up instead and advises the police to be careful while tackling Reg. Colin reappears when he stands trial for the Robbery.
John Francis	24–26 May (2 episodes)	Terry Cade	John is a member of Reg Dawson's (Niven Boyd) gang, who served time with him in prison. He assists in Reg's raid on the post office and gets away but crashes his car and is found bloodied on a roadside in Robblesfield.
Simmy	24–31 May (3 episodes)	Stuart St. Paul	Simmy is a member of Reg Dawson's (Niven Boyd) gang who assists in the post Office robbery and is involved in a shootout with Joe Sugden (Frazer Hines) while trying to escape across the moors. When Reg and Colin Long (Al Hunter-Ashton) take Viv Windsor (Deena Payne) and Shirley Turner (Rachel Davies) hostage at home farm, Simmy bursts in through a window and Reg mistakes him for a police officer and shoots Simmy twice, killing him.
Sven Olsen	23 June – 4 August (9 episodes)	Daniel O'Grady	An Australian man, who is known amongst the farmers in the village. He works at Emmerdale Farm for a few weeks following Michael Feldmann's departure. When he leaves the village, Sven asks Lynn Whiteley (Fionnuala Ellwood) and her son Peter Whiteley to go back to Australia to live with him.
Arthur Prendegast	27 October	George Malpas	Arthur is Betty Eagleton's (Paula Tilbrook) father. Betty introduces him to her fiancé Seth Armstrong (Stan Richards). He is unimpressed with Seth at first but sees he makes Betty happy and shakes his hand.
