= Lisa Dingle =

Fictional character from Emmerdale

- Emmerdale character
- Portrayed by: Jane Cox
- Duration: 1996–2020, 2024
- First appearance: Episode 2106; 13 August 1996
- Last appearance: Episode 9917/18; 15 February 2024
- Introduced by: Mervyn Watson
- Spin-off appearances: Emmerdale: The Dingles Down Under (1997); Emmerdale: The Dingles For Richer for Poorer (2010)
In-universe information
- Other names: Lisa Greasor; Lisa Clegg
- Occupation: Mechanic; Builder; Pig farmer; Painter and decorator; Packer
- Husband: Barry Clegg (until 1997); Zak Dingle (1998–2016, 2019)
- Daughters: Belle Dingle
- Stepsons: Butch Dingle; Cain Dingle; Sam Dingle; Ben Dingle
- Stepdaughters: Tina Dingle
- First cousins: Lizzie Lakely

Lisa Dingle (also Clegg) is a fictional character from the British soap opera Emmerdale, played by Jane Cox. Lisa's storylines include being raped by her colleague Derek Benrose (Stephen Bent), becoming a parent in later life, assaulting a police officer, suffering an angina attack, dealing with her daughter's psychosis and discovering that her husband Zak (Steve Halliwell) has fallen in love with their lodger Joanie Wright (Denise Black), which led to their divorce after 18 years of marriage. On 7 May 2018, the character left the village and Emmerdale confirmed Cox was taking a sabbatical from the show. Lisa returned on 8 March 2019, and revealed that she had been diagnosed with amyloidosis. Cox then announced that she had quit her role, and that Lisa would be killed-off. Lisa made her final on-screen appearance during the episode broadcast on 24 May 2019. Cox briefly returned for voiceovers on 6 June 2019 and for several more in October and November 2020 and February 2024.

== Casting ==
Lisa Clegg was first introduced by producer Mervyn Watson in 1996 who cast Jane Cox for the role. Lisa first appeared in August 1996, as a potential love interest for Zak Dingle (Steve Halliwell) after his wife Nellie Dingle (Sandra Gough) left to care for her father in Ireland.

Jane Cox really loved the idea to play Lisa Clegg in Emmerdale. In an interview shortly after landing the role of Lisa, Jane stated [...] 'I was told that Lisa was a big lady and most comfortable in wellington boots [...] . Jane Cox had originally auditioned for the role of Nellie Dingle. However Mervyn Watson gave the role to Sandra Gough, Cox was pleased she got the part of Lisa Clegg instead because she really enjoyed the character. [...] She's very practical and down to earth. I like the fact that she spends most of the time in a boiler suit but can be sassy.[...]

=== Departure and brief returns ===
On 8 March 2019, during a special episode to commemorate International Women's Day, the character returned after a temporary break and told Charity Dingle (Emma Atkins) that she had been diagnosed with terminal heart condition amyloidosis. After the episode aired, Cox announced that she had quit Emmerdale after nearly 23 years, and Lisa was killed off on 23 May 2019. Cox made a brief return for a voiceover on 6 June 2019, as each family member read a letter from Lisa. Cox also returned for several voiceovers in 2020, as part of Belle Dingle's mental health storyline. The voiceovers were broadcast over the course of October and November 2020. On 15 February 2024, Lisa was heard whilst Belle was reading her letter which Lisa wrote for Belle for her wedding.

== Storylines ==
Lisa meets Zak Dingle (Steve Halliwell) and they develop feelings for one another. However, Lisa nearly accepts a marriage proposal from Zak's brother Albert Dingle (Bobby Knutt). but Lisa's former husband, Barry Clegg (Bernard Wrigley), stopped the wedding and Zak declares his love for her. Barry causes the Dingle's barn to explode when he builds a rocket. Despite their problems, Zak and Lisa marry. Various family troubles kept them busy during that year, but Zak and Lisa were surprised when Lisa went out to the barn and went into labour, when Lisa didn't know she was pregnant. The arrival of baby Belle (Emily Mather; later Eden Taylor-Draper) served to deepen Zak and Lisa's marriage, even surviving the nightmare that was Zak's ex-wife Nellie's stay in the village. Lisa was deeply saddened when Zak's son Butch (Paul Loughran) was killed in a bus crash in the village. She even moved out when it was clear Zak blamed her as she'd fixed the brakes on the vehicle before it crashed. After a few months, Zak realised he could not live without Lisa and begged her to move back in.

In 2001, tragedy hit again when Zak was diagnosed with testicular cancer. Zak overcame the illness with Lisa's support and repaid his wife by inviting his mother Peg to move in. With Peg around, tensions in the Dingle household reached fever pitch. When she went, everyone was relieved. The family was split again when Zak went off to South America in 2002 in search of the Dingle treasure – without Lisa's blessing. With her husband away, Lisa felt vulnerable – especially with Zak's brother, Shadrach (Andy Devine), coming on to her all the time. In the end, Lisa resorted to violent tactics to make Shadrach back off and was relieved he got the message. Although she enjoyed a few dates with Bob Hope's (Tony Audenshaw) brother Eddie (Nigel Betts), it was clear that Zak was still the man for Lisa – a fact confirmed by his return and their subsequent reunion.

Lisa and Zak were shocked to discover that Zak's granddaughter Debbie (Charley Webb) was pregnant and no one was aware of her pregnancy. Lisa felt she had let Debbie down and was determined to give her all the support she needed to bring up baby Sarah. Unfortunately, Debbie couldn't cope with being a mother. She did everything she could to avoid looking after her daughter which infuriated Lisa, causing many rows and this left Lisa at the end of her tether. So when Debbie gave baby Sarah to Emily Kirk (Kate McGregor), who then disappeared, Lisa hit the roof. Unable to bear the sight of Debbie, Lisa was relieved when she departed the Dingle home.

More tragedy was to hit the family when Zak's son, Sam (James Hooton), announced his girlfriend Alice Wilson (Ursula Holden-Gill) was pregnant – only for that news to be followed by the revelation that Alice had cancer. Lisa proved to be the backbone of the family as everyone tried to prepare Sam for Alice's death and looking after their baby son, Samson, alone. The morning of the competition in Emmerdale's 5000th episode, Lisa accidentally knocked out Val Lambert (Charlie Hardwick) by pushing her down some stairs while carrying a big bag of linens. Lisa and Val had been feuding, and Lisa worried Val might have it out for her. Eli Dingle (Joseph Gilgun) tied and gagged Val whilst Lisa was gone, intending to ransom her. Val was fuming at the Dingles until Lisa accidentally let it slip that Eric Pollard (Chris Chittell) was planning the wedding for that day. Val and Eric did get married, in front of friends and family.

Lisa was relieved when Belle's time at private school came to an end. She went there initially because Rosemary King (Linda Thorson) realised how intelligent Belle was and offered to pay the fees. Anything else, from the uniform to school trips, were to be funded by the Dingles. But when Rosemary left the village, she stopped paying the fees and it was a struggle for Zak and Lisa to pay them. They borrowed a lot of money from Debbie, leading her to get into trouble with Carl King (Tom Lister), who she borrowed the money from.

After Zak quit his job at Home Farm, following a row over breakages Matthew King (Matt Healy) insisted Zak pay for, Belle's friends found out that Zak hadn't paid the fees and teased her about it. So, recognising the problem, Zak and Lisa removed her from the private school and re-enrolled her into state school. In April 2009, Lisa's blind cousin, Lizzie Lakely (Kitty McGeever) arrived, and Lisa got her a job working at Sharma & Sharma alongside her. Lisa also managed to create a bond between Debbie and her daughter, Sarah. Andy agreed to let the Dingles see Sarah regularly, and by getting Debbie to visit at the same time as Sarah and play with her, a mother-daughter bond developed.

Towards Christmas 2009, Lisa started nude modelling as the Dingles needed the extra cash for Christmas in order to buy Belle a laptop and other presents for family. When Lisa told Zak how tight fisted she thought Nikhil Sharma (Rik Makarem) was, Zak grew suspicious as Lisa had said the money for Belle's laptop came from a work bonus. Lisa was forced to tell Zak the truth. He initially wasn't happy she kept it from him, but he came round. When Eli and Shadrach found out, they kept making wisecracks so Lisa decided to stop due to the lack of support from people round her, after admitting to Zak that she felt good about herself. Also towards Christmas, Lizzie was knocked down in the dark by Zak's great-nephew, Aaron Livesy (Danny Miller), as he was angry over his discovery that he was gay. She dropped her purse and Lisa was horrified, determined to know who it was. Soon after, Aaron returned Lizzie's purse to her, but refused a reward, as she didn't know who he really was. Later, Lisa accidentally punched a police officer, was arrested, and was sentenced to three months imprisonment.

Upon her release in late 2010, Derek Benrose began working at the Sharma Sweet Factory alongside Lisa. They formed a close friendship, and Zak got on well with Derek too, but in January 2011, after agreeing to work overtime with Lisa, Derek took advantage of the fact they were alone and raped Lisa, Lisa faced further heartache in March, when she eventually told the police about her rape and they didn't have enough evidence to pursue a case against Derek. Lisa is furious because of this, but resigns herself to get over it. By the end of 2011, Cain Dingle (Jeff Hordley) had turned the whole village against himself as his conniving ways had gotten everyone fed up with him. In December 2011, Cain got justice when he was attacked and later found badly beaten on the verge of death. The main suspects in the attack were John Barton (James Thornton) and Jai Sharma (Chris Bisson), who both had reasons for Cain's comeuppance; John's wife Moira Barton (Natalie J. Robb) had an affair with Cain, while Jai and Cain were sworn enemies due to his history with Charity Dingle (Emma Atkins). Lisa herself believed it may have been Jai, but it all came to a head in January 2012, after Aaron broke Jai's window; Zak confessed to all that he was Cain's attacker. Lisa was utterly shocked, but stood by her husband while Cain decided not to press charges, but his relationship with the rest of the Dingle clan became strained.

In April 2012 Lisa began to notice some changes in Zak; he had been consumed in paranoia over his chickens, and while a vet confirmed they were fine, Zak had them all killed. Alarmed, the family put it down to Zak's cancer returning, but doctors later confirmed Zak was suffering a mental breakdown, and he was sectioned. While Zak was eventually reunited with his family, he still felt guilty over his acts. Chas Dingle's (Lucy Pargeter) boyfriend Cameron Murray (Dominic Power) was sent to prison for the murders of Carl, Alex Moss (Kurtis Stacey) and Gennie Walker (Sian Reese-Williams), but he escaped and took the entire Woolpack hostage, including Zak, who was nearly shot by Cameron when he engaged in a struggle with him. Zak, along with most of The Woolpack (excluding Debbie and Chas), was freed by Cameron, to a relieved (but still worried) Lisa's joy, that her husband had escaped. The duo are later relieved when Debbie and Chas both escape together whilst Cameron is killed after unintentionally electrocuting himself in The Woolpack.

A feud between the Dingles and the Andrews family ignited when Belle's boyfriend Sean Spencer (Luke Roskell) was found to have gotten Belle's friend Gemma Andrews (Tendai Rinomhota) pregnant. Lisa forbade Sean from seeing Belle again and forced him out when he visited to try to make amends. In April 2014, tragedy struck as Belle pushed Gemma over during an argument, and the latter banged her head on a stone, causing a brain hemorrhage which proved fatal. The two warring families then made peace after this event, but Belle was consumed by guilt and in July 2014, pleaded guilty to manslaughter after initially planning to confess to murder, but changed her mind at the insistence of Cain. Belle was sentenced to three months in a young offender's unit and Lisa was distraught.

Stress continued to pile on to Lisa throughout the months as Charity's life spiralled out of control when her husband Declan Macey (Jason Merrells) attempted to kill her, and Sam's girlfriend Rachel Breckle (Gemma Oaten) was forced to go into hiding to cover for her, and it all came crashing down in October 2014 when Lisa, after welcoming Belle home against her boss Jai's wishes, was sacked from Sharma & Sharma, and suffered what she believed to be a heart attack as she cried herself home. Lisa's health scare lead to her being diagnosed with angina, and what she suffered was an angina attack. She would have to rest a lot more now, so Zak took up most of the household chores for Lisa's sake.

After months of Belle's increasingly wavey and disturbing behaviour, Zak and Lisa discovered she had been hearing Gemma's voice in her head after she almost ran over Zak. This was found to be fueled by a drug addiction introduced to Belle by local teen Lachlan White (Thomas Atkinson). They pledged to help her when Katie Sugden (Sammy Winward) told the Dingles she knew of Belle's condition, but things went from bad to worse when Katie was found dead and Belle assumed bad events, such as Gemma and Katie's deaths, happened when she was around, and deciding the world would be better without her, almost jumped from the top of a barn roof, but was talked out of it by Harriet Finch (Katherine Dow Blyton), and caught by Cain when she lost her balance. Following this emotional rollercoaster, Belle was sent to an institute to help her problem, though she could not attend Katie's funeral, which upset her greatly. When Belle was released, Lisa was relieved to have all her family reunited.

Throughout the summer of 2015, Lisa had vacated Emmerdale to dote on Granny Clegg, who had suffered a fall and needed care. She returned in September to find out that a helicopter had crashed into the village hall during Debbie's failed wedding to Pete Barton (Anthony Quinlan). Lisa also introduced Granny Clegg's secret cordial wine recipe to Belle and her new business partner Kirin Kotecha (Adam Fielding). They showcased their opportunistic proposal to Lisa's former boss Jai and went into business, attempting to sell "Granny Clegg's Cordial" to big-buck supermarkets. However, concern was inevitable to Lisa as she began to suspect Belle and Kirin to be in a more "physical" relationship, so she had Debbie talk to her about intimate matters. Disgusted, Belle briefly began to drift away from Lisa, to her heartache, but they eventually sorted matters out. It was just Zak they had to watch out for. On Christmas Day 2015, Belle reveals to the family that she had seen Zak and the lodger Joanie Wright (Denise Black) together, making Lisa heartbroken. Zak is then exiled from the family.

Lisa's self-esteem drops to an all-time low as a result of the impending dissolution of her marriage, despite the Dingles' especially Belle's, efforts to support her. She is then knocked for six after Cain informs the entire family of a devastating truth; Aaron was raped repeatedly from the age of 8 by his father, Gordon Livesy (Gary Mavers). Lisa finally finds some common ground with Aaron considering the fact they have both been sexually abused. Lisa turns 60, and she is advised by Belle to make a fresh start, so Lisa buys a stunning dress and has herself done up at Bernice Blackstock's (Samantha Giles) beauty salon and she rocks The Woolpack to a very enigmatic Dingle clan. She shocks Belle by telling Zak and Joanie to come to The Woolpack during the party, intending to surprise them. Surprise is a thing that Lisa certainly delivers when she reveals that she has been to see a solicitor, and is divorcing Zak. This effectively ends their 18 year long marriage.

Lisa is devastated to learn that Zak and Joanie are getting married. She later has to deal with a fresh family crisis when it's found out that Belle has been having an affair with a married man over twice her age, Dr. Jermaine Bailey (Micah Balfour), who actually treated Lisa for an angina attack not long before the revelation. Initially the family is disgusted with Bailey, and Cain and Zak even try to rough him up, only to be stopped by Lisa, who argues that in this case, the "Dingle" way of dealing with things won't work this time. The affair seems over, but Belle suddenly reveals she is pregnant with Bailey's baby, which results in him staying in the village after planning to leave due to the collapse of his medical career and marriage. Lisa mediates a reluctant truce between Bailey and the Dingles, and allows him to move into the home.

Joanie asks Belle to be her bridesmaid and Lisa encourages an increasingly agitated Belle to do what she feels right, so she accepts Joanie's request, upsetting Lisa. However, Belle brings home the wrong dress from Joanie's hen night, and the day after, Joanie comes to pick it up and discovers it has a huge wine stain. Lisa owns up to it, and agrees to fix it for the wedding, secretly hoping to convince everyone she is fine with the wedding. Joanie has cold feet on her wedding day, but Lisa convinces Joanie that she should marry Zak, as he is in love with her. As Joanie and Zak say their wedding vows, Lisa looks on and is distraught that Zak has chosen to marry another woman. At an angina check up, the receptionist calls for "Mrs. Dingle" and both Lisa and Joanie answer, when it is Joanie the doctor is looking for. Lisa then makes the decision to change back to her maiden name. The other Dingles are upset by this, believing that Lisa no longer considers them family, and a Dingle meeting is called in The Woolpack. They convince Lisa to keep Dingle as her surname.

Joanie has served her prison sentence for assault and finds upon her release she is picked up by unexpectedly by Lisa in her van. Joanie asks why. Lisa pulls the van over, they discuss Zak and Joanie goes into cardiac arrest. Zak is told by Lisa of Joanie's death. They tell the other villagers in The Woolpack. After Aaron's half-sister Liv Flaherty spikes her drink causing a near-fatal cardiac arrest, Lisa has her arrested, drawing the ire of the Dingles and nearly causing a schism in the family. Lisa ultimately decides life in Emmerdale is unenjoyable so she leaves to Scotland, where she takes a job as a youth counselor. She briefly returns a few weeks later to clarify to Zak that she still loves him but the village make her unhappy. Lisa plans to return to the village when Lachlan White nearly kills Belle in September 2018, but this falls through. Zak goes to stay with Lisa in Scotland in October, later extending the visit into 2019.

Lisa summons Charity to Scotland and informs her that she is dying due to amyloidosis, and wants her to write a eulogy for her funeral even though doctors say Lisa still has ample time left. Zak is aware of Lisa's illness and is apparently not coping, so Lisa urges Charity to avoid informing the rest of the Dingles, including Belle, of her condition.

Zak asked Lisa to marry him and after only two days of planning they married on 23 May 2019 in the church. Before the wedding, the Dingle's pigs escaped from their pen and were rounded up by Cain, Belle and Lisa in their wedding outfits causing Lisa's dress to become covered in mud. After the wedding, celebrations were held in the pub and Lisa went home to get changed as she did not want her wedding photos to be of her covered in mud. Zak went to find her and found her asleep on the sofa but when he tried to wake her up he realised that she had died.

== Reception ==
Cox was nominated for the 2011 British Soap Award for "Best Actress".
