= Vic Windsor =

Fictional character from Emmerdale

- Emmerdale character
- Portrayed by: Alun Lewis
- Duration: 1993–1998
- First appearance: 10 August 1993
- Last appearance: 25 December 1998
- Spin-off appearances: The Dingles Down Under (1997)
In-universe information
- Occupation: Postmaster
- Wife: Anne Windsor (backstory); Viv Dawson (until 1998)
- Daughters: Kelly Windsor; Donna Windsor
- Adoptive sons: Scott Windsor
- Grandsons: Elliot Windsor
- Granddaughters: Jean Tate (adoptive); April Windsor

Victor "Vic" Windsor is a fictional character from the British ITV soap opera Emmerdale, played by Alun Lewis for a period of five years, from 1993 until 1998. Vic was the second husband of shopkeeper, Viv Windsor (Deena Payne), and also father of Kelly Windsor (Adele Silva) and Donna Windsor (Verity Rushworth). He was killed off in an armed robbery by Billy Hopwood (David Crellin) on Christmas Day 1998.

== Storylines ==
Vic and Viv had married in 1984, with both of them having been previously married. Vic had started an affair with Viv whilst he was still married to his first wife Anne. Anne returned home to discover Vic and Viv in bed together and fled the house in shock and was run over and killed by a car. Vic had a daughter from his marriage to Anne, Kelly, and Viv had a son from her first marriage, Scott, whom Vic formally adopted and who took his surname. Vic and Viv later have a daughter of their own, Donna. In the summer of 1993, Vic had let his family believe they were moving to a post office in Devon when they were actually moving to Yorkshire. Viv was furious at first but the family soon settled into Beckindale. The Windsors made an instant impact in the village with Vic scaring Kim Tate's horse with dangerous driving and nearly getting into a fight with Joe Sugden (Frazer Hines) in the Woolpack pub. However, Vic and Viv helped Kim and Frank Tate during the plane crash in December by salvaging Kim's belongings from her stables which were on fire.

Viv's ex-husband and Scott's father, Reg Dawson (Niven Boyd) later arrived in the village. He took Viv hostage along with Shirley Turner (Rachel Davies) at Home Farm. Vic panicked and repeatedly tried to break through the police lines to get to Viv. He was relieved when Viv was brought out of the house alive, although Shirley had been killed. Reg had been shot dead by the police and in his will left money to Viv on condition that she divorce Vic but she refused.

Scott then became more troublesome and started skipping school, stealing money, bought an air rifle from Butch Dingle (Paul Loughran) and accidentally shot Donna in the face whilst Vic was struggling to take the gun off him. When Vic declared Scott was "no son of his", he left to join the army. The Windsors also faced competition from the Dingles when they opened up a fry up shop on a truck outside the post office. Vic was shocked when Kelly started a relationship with her teacher Tom Bainbridge. Despite Tom nearly being the same age as him, Vic supported his daughter's decision and comforted Kelly when she returned and revealed that Tom had cheated on her with another pupil. Around the same time, Viv embarked on an affair with Terry Woods (Billy Hartman) after taking up salsa dancing classes with him, and she and Vic separated when the truth came out.

On Viv's 41st birthday she and Vic reconciled. On Christmas Day 1998, the family went out to have dinner at The Woolpack. After Alan Turner (Richard Thorp) explained that he was running out of food due to the unexpected large turn out, Vic returned to the shop to get some puddings to give to Alan. However criminal Billy Hopwood (David Crellin), broke into the post office armed with a shotgun, intending to rob from the safe. Vic tried to seize the gun from Billy and there was a brief struggle in which Vic fell against some shelves, seriously injuring himself. Vic pleaded with Billy, who had also been injured, to call him an ambulance but he ran off. Back at The Woolpack, Viv had been going to find Vic, but found more interest in listening to gossip about Eric Pollard (Chris Chittell). Terry went to the post office instead and discovered Vic, already dead. Terry called the police and ambulance and informed Viv and Kelly of Vic's death.
