= Roberta Kerr =

English actress (born 1952)

- Born: Roberta Alexandra Kerr; 24 May 1952 (age 74); Southampton, Hampshire, England
- Occupation: Actress
- Years active: 1984–present
- Known for: Brookside; Coronation Street; Emmerdale

Roberta Alexandra Kerr (born 24 May 1952) is an English actress. She is known for her various roles in British soap operas including Sally Haynes in Brookside, Wendy Crozier in Coronation Street and Jan Glover in Emmerdale, as well as portraying several characters in Doctors.

== Life and career ==
Kerr was born in Southampton, England on 24 May 1952. She began her acting career in 1984 when she joined the Channel 4 soap opera Brookside as Sally Haynes. She portrayed the character on a recurring basis until 1986. In 1985 she played another character named Sally in an episode of Travelling Man and in 1986, she played Mrs. Bennett in an episode of the BBC Two drama anthology series ScreenPlay. In 1988, she made her film debut as Mrs. Dalton in The Nature of the Beast and also appeared in an episode of the mini-series Wipe Out, where she played a civil servant.

In 1989, Kerr joined the cast of the ITV soap opera Coronation Street as Wendy Crozier, a woman who works for the council and embarks on an affair with Ken Barlow (William Roache), which led to his divorce from his wife, Deirdre (Anne Kirkbride). She left the show in May 1990 following the conclusion of the storyline. In July 1994, Kerr portrayed Pam Blake in an episode of the ITV drama series Medics. The following month, she was cast as Jan Glover in Emmerdale, the wife of Ned (Johnny Leeze). During her time on the show, the character's major storylines included coming to terms with the deaths of her children Dave (Ian Kelsey) and Linda (Tonicha Jeronimo), as well as suffering a nervous breakdown and being sectioned. Kerr departed the role after four years in 1998. In 1999, Kerr played Tania Sylvester in an episode of Casualty and in 2000, she portrayed Miss Robinson in the film Seeing Red. In 2005, Kerr appeared in the BBC soap opera Doctors as Margaret Ellen. She went on to return to Doctors on two further occasions, portraying the roles of Sheila Mitchum and Joan Jonson in 2007 and 2020, respectively. Kerr also had minor guest roles in The Royal Today, Silk, Downton Abbey and Hollyoaks.

In 2012, Kerr reprised her role of Wendy Crozier in Coronation Street for a short stint, as part of a storyline where Wendy and Ken are reacquainted again after becoming governors at the same school. The character departed after her advances were rejected by Ken. Ten years later, in 2022, she reprised the role again as a regular character. The return saw Wendy as a foster carer involved in a storyline centred around Abi Franklin (Sally Carman) attempting to gain custody of her son.

== Filmography ==
Year	Title	Role	Notes	Ref.
1984–1986, 1989	Brookside	Sally Haynes	Recurring role; 12 episodes	
1985	Travelling Man	Sally	Episode: "The Quiet Chapter"	
1986	ScreenPlay	Mrs. Bennett	Episode: "Brick is Beautiful"	
1988	The Nature of the Beast	Mrs. Dalton	Film role	
1988	Wipe Out	Civil servant	Mini-series	
1989–1990, 2012, 2022	Coronation Street	Wendy Crozier	Series regular; 103 episodes	
1994	Medics	Pam Blake	Episode: "Consequences"	
1994–1998	Emmerdale	Jan Glover	Series regular; 314 episodes	
1999	Casualty	Tania Sylvester	Episode: "Free Fall"	
2000	Seeing Red	Miss Robinson	Film role	
2001	EastEnders	Anne Fletcher	1 episode	
2005	Doctors	Margaret Ellen	Episode: "The Girl Who Came Back"	
2006	The Write Kit	Mrs. Larkin	Video role	
2007	Doctors	Sheila Mitchum	Episode: "Protection"	
2008	The Royal Today	Caroline Whitefield	1 episode	
2012	One Last Walk	Sheila Graham	Short film	
2012, 2017	Hollyoaks	Judge Barrett	2 episodes	
2014	Silk	Magistrate	1 episode	
2014	Downton Abbey	Chemist's assistant	1 episode	
2020	Doctors	Joan Jonson	Episode: "Too Proud"	
