= Frank Tate (Emmerdale) =

Fictional character from Emmerdale

- Emmerdale character
- Portrayed by: Norman Bowler
- Duration: 1989–1997
- First appearance: 21 November 1989
- Last appearance: 27 May 1997
- Introduced by: Keith Richardson
In-universe information
- Occupation: Businessman
- Wife: Jean Tate (backstory); Kim Tate (until 1993, 1994–1997)
- Sons: Liam Hammond; Chris Tate; Caleb Miligan; Jamie Tate
- Daughters: Zoe Tate
- Grandsons: Joe Tate; Noah Dingle; Nicky Miligan; Thomas Tate
- Granddaughters: Jean Tate; Millie Tate; Steph Miligan(adoptive)

Frank Tate is a fictional character from the British television soap opera Emmerdale, played by Norman Bowler. He made his first appearance on 21 November 1989 and remained a regular for almost eight years, before Bowler opted to quit in 1996, leading to his character's exit the following year. Introduced as the patriarch of the Tate family, who were brought in as part of the show's rebranding in 1989, many of Frank's storylines revolved around his volatile relationship with his wife Kim Tate (Claire King).

During his time in the programme, Frank and Kim divorced and remarried before his death of a heart attack – brought on by her return to the village after being presumed dead – ended their second marriage. Other notable storylines included his addiction to alcohol; coming to terms with his daughter Zoe’s (Leah Bracknell) sexuality; sparking a conflict with his own son Chris (Peter Amory); discovering Kim's affair with local handyman Dave Glover (Ian Kelsey); and his various business dealings and feuds with the likes of Dave's father Ned Glover (Johnny Leeze), his close friend Jack Sugden (Clive Hornby), and fellow businessman Steve Marchant (Paul Opacic).

== Development ==
Bowler decided to leave the serial in 1997, and stated "I've done seven-and-a-half years in Emmerdale and want to move on to do other things. I think it's better that I make a clean break rather than keep coming back. I have no regrets." Frank was killed off as part of an hourlong episode, in which his estranged wife Kim Tate (Claire King) returned to the village, following her presumed death. The episode out performed rival soap opera EastEnders in the ratings.

== Storylines ==
Frank first appears in November 1989 when Matt Skilbeck (Frederick Pyne) visits Home Farm to speak to him over the condition of several ewes in his company, which Matt refuses to allow Chris Tate (Peter Amory) to have. After a tense confrontation between them, Frank reveals that Chris, the manager whom Matt despises and wants sacked, is, in fact, his son. Having made his fortune in haulage, he and Kim have bought Home Farm. The two continue to run Tate Haulage with Chris. In December, they are joined by Chris's sister and Frank's daughter, Zoe Tate (Leah Bracknell). Frank and Kim's married life is shattered in 1992 when Kim has an affair with the Honourable Neil Kincaid (Brian Deacon). Frank subsequently throws her out and they divorce. Frank is deeply affected by his separation from Kim and turns to alcohol to drown his sorrows.

Frank is deemed a hero during the plane crash that rocks Emmerdale in December 1993, when he helps local farmer Jack Sugden (Clive Hornby) build a makeshift bridge that was demolished by the crash and lets the emergency services across. During the plane crash aftermath, Frank stops Kim running into her burning stables to rescue her horses. Frank and Kim soon reconcile and they remarry in December 1994. With his life back on track, Frank stops drinking, and he and Kim enjoy their remarriage. However, in 1995, Home Farm employee Dave Glover (Ian Kelsey) catches Kim's eye and they begin an affair. Frank hires a spy to watch Kim and Dave, and eventually catches them in bed together, uttering the line "What do you call this, Dave – overtime?". Kim later discovers she is pregnant and gives birth to baby James in September 1996. Frank pays Kim £1 million to name the baby as his, although Frank is eventually revealed to be James's biological father, anyway. Dave dies on Boxing Day 1996 while rescuing baby James from a fire.

In 1997, Kim enacts her next plot against Frank by faking her own death, resulting in Frank's being imprisoned for her murder. After Frank is released, Kim shocks him by turning up on his doorstep in May, and reveals that the woman who had been killed was, in fact, a double, and, after a heated argument, Frank suffers a massive heart attack. As Frank lies dying, Kim utters the last words he ever hears: "You're a dinosaur, Frank, and we all know what happened to them." Zoe finds Frank, but it is too late and the true circumstances of his death remain unknown until Kim smugly taunts Chris in January 1999 before fleeing the country. Two years after Frank's death, it is revealed that Tate Haulage employee Liam Hammond (Mark Powley), who takes Chris hostage, is Frank's illegitimate son from a previous extramarital affair. Chris bonds with Liam, but Zoe, while attempting to rescue Chris, shoots and kills Liam. As the police have no proof of murder, no charges are laid against Zoe. Liam is then buried next to Frank.

== Reception ==
The Observer's Andy Medhurst branded Frank the "local capitalist" and "baronial" during a storyline about his attempt to get a new road built through the Sugden's farm. Medhurst thought the Sugdens represented the old, gentle Emmerdale, while Frank was "the figurehead of modernity". Medhurst added that the Tates often featured in all "the tastiest plots". Nancy Banks-Smith of The Guardian commented that "Frank and Kim made Punch and Judy look chummy".
