= Kim Tate =

Fictional character from Emmerdale

- Emmerdale character
- Portrayed by: Claire King
- Duration: 1989–1999, 2018–present
- First appearance: Episode 1411; 12 December 1989
- Introduced by: Keith Richardson (1989); Jane Hudson (2018)
In-universe information
- Other names: Kim Tate; Kim Foster; Kim Taylor
- Occupation: Businesswoman
- Husband: Frank Tate (until 1993, 1994–1997); Steve Marchant (1998–1999); Graham Foster (2012–); Will Taylor (2022–2024; void)
- Sons: Jamie Tate
- Daughters: Thea Ramsden
- Stepsons: Liam Hammond; Chris Tate; Caleb Miligan
- Stepdaughters: Zoe Tate; Dawn Fletcher
- Grandsons: Thomas Tate; Joe Tate (step); Noah Dingle (step)
- Granddaughters: Millie Tate
- Uncles: Harry Barker

Kim Tate (also Barker and Marchant) is a fictional character from the British ITV soap opera Emmerdale, played by Claire King. The character debuted on-screen during the episode broadcast on 12 December 1989. Kim is portrayed in the serial as an antagonist, who often concocts money making and vengeful schemes against other characters. During her first stint in the series, Kim's turbulent marriage to Frank Tate (Norman Bowler) was prominent. Writers also explored her difficult relationship with her stepchildren, Chris and Zoe Tate (Leah Bracknell). Kim's motive for her scheming was to gain control of the Tate family business; her marriage was problematic due to her affairs with Neil Kincaid (Brian Deacon) and Dave Glover (Ian Kelsey), the latter died after he saved Kim's son James Tate (Sam Silson) from a fire.

Kim's other prominent stories include faking her own death to frame Frank before leaving him to die of a heart attack, and a business partnership with Lord Alex Oakwell (Rupam Maxwell), which culminates in the death of Linda Fowler (Tonicha Jeronimo). As revenge, Linda's mother Jan Glover (Roberta Kerr) kidnaps James. Writers created a relationship between Kim and Steve Marchant (Paul Opacic), a subsequent marriage and more money making scams. King decided to leave Emmerdale and Kim departed during the episode broadcast on 19 January 1999, when she escaped the village in a helicopter with James and £190,000 of Chris' money.

King returned to the series in 2018 for a guest appearance before returning the following year permanently. Her return featured Kim being pushed off a balcony at Home Farm by Faith Dingle (Sally Dexter). Early in her second stint, storylines involving her mostly followed her relationship with Graham Foster (Andrew Scarborough) - who later turned out to be her husband; he was soon killed off in a whodunit storyline. Later storylines saw her pursue a relationship and later marriage with her employee Will Taylor (Dean Andrews), her feuds with daughter-in-law Andrea Tate (Anna Nightingale), stepdaughter Dawn Taylor (Olivia Bromley), her son Jamie (now played by Alexander Lincoln), Jamie's ex-lover Gabby Thomas (Rosie Bentham) and Will's ex-wife Rose Jackson (Christine Tremarco). Critics of the genre have praised Kim and she has often been branded as "the ultimate soap bitch".

== Development ==
=== Characterisation and portrayal ===
Kim is an archetypal soap "superbitch," a ruthless and scheming gold-digger. In the 2014 Channel 5 documentary TV's Nastiest Villains, King explained that as a big fan of the American soap operas Dallas and Dynasty, she realised that British soap operas did not have a "bitch" character at the time and intentionally played up Kim's bitchiness.

In King's autobiography, "Confessions of a Bad Girl', she wrote that Kim was originally going to be married to Chris, but the writers decided that Kim was more interested in the Tate money and would have "cut out the middle man" by marrying Frank.

=== Departure (1999) ===
King left the series and Kim departed in January 1999. Speaking about Kim's departure in 1999, series producer Kieran Roberts felt that it would have been wrong to kill off the character as she was the "ultimate survivor". Roberts added that Kim's escape in a helicopter was fitting and signified her triumph over those around her.

=== Reintroduction (2018) ===
On 24 September 2018, it was confirmed that Claire King had reprised her role as Kim Tate after almost twenty years off-screen. Her return aired as part of a "special week" of episodes between 8 and 12 October 2018. King noted that she had been asked to return in the past, but felt the timing was right this time around as there was already another Tate in the show following Joe Tate's (Ned Porteous) return in 2017. King knew about Kim's return about a year before it was announced. To keep the return under wraps, King's name was kept secret on call sheets and scripts, and the actress had to enter the set through a back entrance to avoid fans at the front entrance.

On 12 October 2018, it was confirmed that Kim would be returning permanently in 2019. Speaking about Kim's return, executive producer Jane Hudson said: "Although Kim's initial return was fleeting, she caused such mischief and chaos that we simply couldn't resist bringing her back. Kim Tate is just getting warmed up for an explosive 2019 which will see her hell-bent on getting exactly what, and who, she wants." Kim returned on 14 March 2019.

== Storylines ==
=== 1989–1999 ===
Kim had an affair with Frank Tate (Norman Bowler) while she worked as his secretary. They later married after Frank's wife, Jean, died of cancer. Kim initially got on well with her stepchildren Chris (Peter Amory) and Zoe (Leah Bracknell), but her marriage to Frank soon wore her down. The Tate family move to Beckindale in late 1989 as the new owners of Home Farm. Despite an initial hostile reception from the villagers, including the arson of one of the family's caravans in 1990, they soon settle in and the family are happy for a short time. However, when Kim becomes pregnant and later loses the child, Frank falls into a deep depression and turns to alcohol, neglecting Kim in the process.

Kim befriends The Rt Hon. Neil Kincaid (Brian Deacon), a family friend, who is much closer to her own age and shares her equine interests. The pair find themselves travelling to auctions together and eventually, realizing their attraction to one another, consummate their relationship and embark on an affair. They soon come under threat from Chris' wife, Kathy (Malandra Burrows), when she discovers a hotel bill that Neil accidentally dropped at Home Farm. The secret remains safe until Christmas Day 1992, when Frank finds an expensive watch he'd believed to be his present being worn by Neil. Kim is thrown out of Home Farm by Frank, residing at Neil's into the New Year and divorcing her husband. After Kim and Frank separate in 1993, she sets up stables under her maiden name of Kim Barker. This, however, doesn't last long as the stables are destroyed in the plane crash in December that year, killing many of the horses. After the plane crash, Frank and Kim put aside their differences and reconcile, remarrying in December 1994; Zoe becomes thoroughly skeptical of her father's decision, while Chris never trusted Kim again.

In 1995, Kim begins an affair with Kathy's boyfriend Dave Glover (Ian Kelsey), shortly after Kathy had divorced Chris for having an affair with her best-friend, Rachel Hughes (Glenda McKay). This time Kim is much more ruthless about keeping the affair secret and tramples Kathy's brother Nick with her horse when he threatened to expose her. She also threatens Nick's daughter Alice. When Frank has a heart attack and is advised to take it easy, Kim encourages him to sleep with her in the hope of inducing another heart attack. Kim became pregnant and isn't sure who the father is. When Frank overhears Dave and Biff Fowler (Stuart Wade) discussing the situation, he has another heart attack and ends up in hospital. He then has time to think and decided to pretend not to know about the affair while hiring a private detective to follow Kim and Dave before confronting his wife with the evidence. He also hires scheming Tina Dingle as a secretary in Home Farm who uses to wind Kim up by wearing her dresses that Frank had bought. He offers her a million pounds to dump Dave and name him as the father and Kim accepts. Their son was named James Francis Tate.

However, after bonding with the baby, Kim and Dave resume their relationship, despite the fact that Kathy had forgiven his affair and married him. They plan to run away together, but a fire breaks out at Home Farm and Dave dies in hospital on Boxing Day 1996 of injuries sustained while rescuing baby James. In February 1997, Kim disappears from the village, and a few days later a woman was found dead at the wheel of her car. Frank identifies the body as Kim; however, in May Frank is stunned when Kim returns, revealing she had paid a lookalike prostitute to drive her car around the village to fool people into thinking she was still there (when in fact she had fled to the Caribbean) and that it is her body, not Kim's, that Frank had identified. The shock causes Frank, who had spent time on remand for her murder, to have another heart attack, this time fatal. Kim watches him die, saying "You're a dinosaur Frank – and you know what happened to them", checks he is dead with her compact mirror, then coolly redid her make-up. Chris blames her for his death and swears revenge.

After Frank's will is read out, Kim inherits a half share of Home Farm. She later starts seeing Frank's business partner, Steve Marchant (Paul Opacic), who also had a share in Home Farm, and they soon marry in May 1998. As time went on, however, the couple became on the verge of financial bankruptcy and they soon planned to restore their problems by stealing a horse and selling it after replacing it with an older horse in the hope that no one would notice the difference. In September 1998, Steve stole the horse-box and nearly managed to flee scot-free, until he ended up running over Kathy. He later attempts to kill her in hospital, but Kim stops him after learning about the incident. Once Steve has gone, Kim manages to talk to Kathy when she is alone and reveals the truth about her hit-and-run incident – all the while hiding her involvement behind the plan of stealing horse. Kathy, manipulated by Kim, reports Steve to the police and he is arrested and charged. Steve learns of Kim's betrayal after puzzling the pieces behind her scheme.

On the day of trial in January 1999, when the lawyers begin to question Kathy's validity as a witness for Steve's hit-and-run crime, Kathy herself begins to question how true Kim's words are. For this, and numerous other crooked tricks, the police are soon on Kim's trail. Needing to escape, Kim discovers that Chris has found the money from the robbery that she had buried in Frank's grave. She confronts Chris, tries seducing him, and knocks him out with a paperweight when he is not fooled. Then she confesses that she had indeed, as he speculated, caused his father's death – in precisely the location Chris is lying in. She leaves with her son, James, in a helicopter. The pilot asks her if she is Kim Marchant, and she replies, "No, Kim Tate". Shortly afterwards, her plan to frame Steve for their fraudulent dealings succeeded when he was found guilty; Steve was consequently sentenced to 10 years for Kathy's hit-and-run and 12 months for the crimes Kim had been charged with.

In 2005, she sends flowers to Emmerdale for the funeral of Seth, and it is believed that she has since resided in Ireland. By 2013, Kim was sent to prison and sent James to boarding school.

=== 2018–present ===
Kim is released from prison in October 2018 and greeted by Graham Foster (Andrew Scarborough) at the gate, who hands her the keys to Home Farm. Kim finds out that her former step-grandson, Joe (Ned Porteous), has run into financial trouble on the day of his wedding to Debbie Dingle (Charley Webb). Kim arrives in Emmerdale and declares herself the owner of Home Farm once again and demands that Graham get rid of Joe. Instead, Graham packs Joe a bag and gives him £100,000 and demands him to leave Emmerdale before Kim arrives. During the welcome home party, Kim insults and alienates various people, including Kerry Wyatt (Laura Norton), Nicola King (Nicola Wheeler) and Brenda Walker (Lesley Dunlop), and when she goes upstairs, she is pushed from the upstairs balcony by an unseen assailant and plummets onto the champagne fountain below. She is rushed to hospital and survives the incident. Later, Debbie's mother Charity Dingle (Emma Atkins) is arrested on suspicion of pushing Kim as she and Kim were seen arguing during the party after insulting her and Chris's son, Noah (Jack Downham). However, it is later revealed that Debbie's grandmother, Faith Dingle (Sally Dexter), is the real culprit who pushed Kim. After she is discharged from hospital, Kim is detained again for six months for dangerous driving.

In March 2019, Graham picks Kim up from prison and they drive back to Home Farm; however, the car slows down to a complete stop - forcing Graham to go out for help. While waiting, Kim flags down Debbie's father and Faith's son, Cain Dingle (Jeff Hordley) - when he comes across her. At first Cain helps Kim, but the two end up in an argument after he learns who she is. When Graham informs Kim that Cain killed Joe, having falsely claimed to have done the job himself, Kim plans to implicate Cain for Joe's murder. Kim tries to get Cain on her side, but he refuses. Later, Kim finds money has gone missing from an offshore account and catches Graham making a suspicious phone call. Kim does some digging and finds out that Joe is still alive and he withdrew money from Kim's offshore account at an ATM in Monte Carlo. Kim steals Noah's phone and buries it in the woods. Cain goes looking for him and after hearing his phone ring, underneath the soil, he fears that Kim has killed him and begins to dig - only to be caught be the police. Kim then threatens to get Cain imprisoned for Joe's murder if he does not do what she wants. Noah becomes suspicious of Kim and Graham after hearing them talking about Joe. Kim finally tells Cain that Joe is not dead and tries blackmailing him into bed in exchange for her telling the police. Cain chases after Graham and fights him in a field, until his wife Moira Dingle (Natalie J. Robb) intervenes to break up the brawl. Cain agrees to sleep with Kim but bails out at the last minute, enraging Kim. Graham phones Joe to say a final goodbye to him, but as Kim threatens to have him killed, he blackmailed her by saying he will tell Jamie if she does not leave Joe alone. Kim tries to contact Jamie but fails to. Debbie slaps Kim once she learns the truth about Joe.

In April, Jamie arrives in Emmerdale to be interviewed for a job at the vet surgery. Later, Kim forms an unlikely friendship with local vet Rhona Goskirk (Zoe Henry) upon requesting her to find an incentive to keep Jamie at the vets. Kim also decides she wants her son living with her at Home Farm and does her best to persuade him to move in. Kim argues with Lisa Dingle (Jane Cox) but later finds out from Jamie that she's terminally ill. Kim suggests sending flowers and a spa voucher, but Jamie disagrees. Kim asks Jamie how she can be better and says she wants to be a proper mother to him but she's out of practice. Kim reveals that all she wants is to spend time with Jamie, with just the two of them and nobody else getting in the way. Jamie tells Kim that nobody forced her to alienate everyone and that she can't change that. Kim tells Jamie she can, and offers Jamie to stay for food and a glass of champagne. Jamie turns down the offer as he has an exam the next day, with Kim offering to help him revise. Jamie refuses and leaves. Some time later, Jamie gives Kim a choice, he will stay at Home Farm but only if she invites Lisa to dinner to make up for being so horrible to her. Kim agrees to do this.

In June, whilst Kim is out riding her horse, a car comes speeding around the corner. It slows down to pass Kim, but the horse gets spooked and he bolts, with Kim chasing after him. As Kim walks her horse to the vet, she spots the car that spooked her horse parked outside the vets so she confronts the driver. Jamie notices Kim arguing with the woman, who he recognises as his wife, Andrea (Anna Nightingale) with his daughter Millie (Willow Bell) in the back of the car. Jamie introduces them to his shocked mother, who is at first frosty with them. At Home Farm, Jamie explains to Andrea that he was going to tell her about moving in when he came home. Kim listens to the pair's conversation from the other side of the door and is pleased that they're arguing. She believes Jamie regrets marrying Andrea and that's why he didn't tell anyone about her and Millie although Jamie states he did that as he was protecting his wife and daughter from her. After Jamie has left, Kim reveals to Rhona that Jamie is married with a child and didn't tell her about them. Kim refuses to sit back and let Andrea take her son away from her. Graham later reveals to Kim that he had hired Andrea to keep tabs on Jamie when he was in a bad place and unable to do so himself. But he then lost contact with Andrea, who had genuinely fallen for Jamie after she fell pregnant with Millie. Jamie is blissfully unaware of the arrangement and despite Kim's belief that Andrea is after Jamie's money, Andrea insists that the wealth is of no interest to her, she loves him.

In July, Rishi Sharma made a deal with Kim to help save Sharma & Sharma. Realising Kim is his only way out, he reluctantly accepts the offer. During this time, Jamie and Andrea planned to get Kim to sign a contract which cuts her out of a deal. However, Kim found out about their plans through an accidental video call by Millie. With Kim having uncovered Jamie's secret plan to trick her into signing over her share of the vets to him, she was furious and sent Graham over to destroy Rhona's career by coming down hard on the vet surgery. Meanwhile, Kim once again appeared to be having a moment of conscience as Jamie threatened to leave. Determined to keep him in her life, she assured him that he could have her share of the vets. Kim became the co-owner of Sharma & Sharma, buying a 49.5% share, after a fire and explosion when the insurance company refused to pay out, causing the Sharmas to no longer be able to afford to pay for the repairs or wages for the workers. She later convinces Nicola to sell her 1% share to her, giving her the majority control over the business. However, she soon reveals the share was actually bought by her secret business partner, Al Chapman (Michael Wildman). The pair then unveil their plans to build an outdoor pursuit centre at the factory grounds, to a shocked Jai and the horrified factory workers who fear they'll lose their jobs.

Graham drops a bombshell on Kim, revealing it was Jamie who called the police on her which resulted in her being convicted in 2013. After Graham revealed he's in a relationship with Rhona, Kim grows upset and jealous. She texts him to come to the pub, where she reveals they are married and it's their anniversary, which left Rhona upset. Graham tells Kim that he is Millie's biological father, not Jamie, after having an affair with Andrea. Kim does a DNA test by getting strands of Millie's hair but Jamie is revealed as her father. Graham crashes their Christmas Day dinner by revealing to Jamie his affair with Andrea.

Graham and Rhona decide to move to France develops feuds with several residents in the village, including Kim. In January, Graham lies to Kim about breaking up with Rhona but when she realises this, she orders Al to kill him, agreeing to pay off his £60,000 debt if he does it. Al finds Graham's body in the woods, realising someone else has murdered him. Kim pays off his debts after lying. However, Kim was struggling to cope with her husband's death. Marlon Dingle (Mark Charnock) is arrested and imprisoned for Graham's murder.

In February, Pierce Harris (Jonathan Wrather), Rhona's rapist ex-husband and Graham's murderer, deliberately cycles out in front of Kim, causing her to run him over. Kim invites Pierce into Home Farm to check him over, completely oblivious to who he is. Posing as a lawyer named Ollie, Kim falls for Pierce's lies and agrees to represent Jamie in his custody battle with Andrea over Millie. After Pierce is spotted by Vanessa Woodfield (Michelle Hardwick), he kidnaps her and ties her up, revealing she has bowel cancer. He used Vanessa to lure Rhona. However, Kim is knocked out by Pierce and is tied up with Vanessa. Rhona live streams him confessing to Graham's murder and drugs him. Pierce is then arrested by armed police and Kim is freed.

In early 2026, Graham Foster came back to the village after everyone thought that he had been dead for the past 6 years! Kim had to struggle with Graham moving into her house. In April of 2026, Kim went to a meal with the Dingles to settle their rivalry. During the dinner, Kim passed out and was rushed to the hospital, Jacob Sugden said that Kim had been eaten poisonous mushrooms. This caused trouble in the Dingle household with fingers pointing to Cain and Sam but then it was revealed that there was a mistake and that actually kim wasn't poisoned by mushrooms, but actually she was poisoned by a painkiller overdose because it turns out that Graham altered with her painkillers. In the scene where it was revealed that Graham was behind it (this was only shown to the audience though, Kim doesn't know), he was on the phone saying that the double dose didn't work. As of the 7th of April 2026, we do not know who Graham was on the phone to.

== Reception ==
Kim Tate is considered one of Emmerdale's most "iconic" and "notorious" characters. According to The Independent, Kim's arrival was a turning point for the show: "Suddenly, it was more Dynasty than dales, and Tate threw herself into the role with gusto, cheating on her husband with a younger man, plotting to kill him to inherit his business, etc, etc. The red-top tabloids, used to a diet of EastEnders and Corrie storylines fed to them by the publicists, suddenly woke up to the existence of Emmerdale – it helped when King began a relationship with another actor, who played her stepson." Her original departure from the show on 19 January 1999 was watched by nearly 15 million viewers and won Best Exit at the 1999 British Soap Awards.

According to Radio Times, Kim "basically wrote the book on British soap bitches." The character was featured in the 2001 Channel 4 countdown of the top ten "TV Bitches" (placing 4th) and the 2014 Channel 5 countdown of "TV's Nastiest Villains" (placing 15th). She has appeared in various published lists of the top soap opera villains. Kim came in fifth in a 2003 TVTimes poll of the top soap villains of all time, the highest-ranked female on the list. She was also named one of the top ten most evil soap villains by the Daily Mirror in 2009 and came in fourth in a 2016 Digital Spy list of the top ten female soap villains of all time. The character was selected as one of the "top 100 British soap characters" in a 2012 poll run by What's on TV, with readers also voting on "Who is Soap's greatest Legend?" In anticipation of her return in 2018, Metro wrote: "viewers fondly remember soap's biggest superbitch, the woman who killed off her ex husband by merely showing up – and applied her lipstick as he drew his last breaths."
