= Emily Kirk =

Fictional character from Emmerdale

- Emmerdale character
- Portrayed by: Kate McGregor
- Duration: 1999–2008
- First appearance: 5 May 1999
- Last appearance: 6 March 2008
- Introduced by: Kieran Roberts (1999); Kathleen Beedles (2006); Anita Turner (2008)
In-universe information
- Other names: Emily Wylie; Emily Dingle
- Occupation: Post office assistant Shopkeeper
- Father: John Wylie
- Mother: Claire Wylie
- Husband: Butch Dingle (2000); Paddy Kirk (2002–2006)

Emily Kirk (also Wylie and Dingle) is a fictional character from the British television soap opera Emmerdale, played by Kate McGregor. She made her first appearance in the episode broadcast on 5 May 1999. Initially portrayed as nervous and naive, Emily lived a sheltered life with her father and lacks social skills, until she takes a job at the local post office. Writers established an uncoventional relationship between Emily and Butch Dingle (Paul Loughran) who, although very different, were both somewhat in experienced and unworldly. McGregor thought the characters brought out the best in each other.

== Casting ==
McGregor joined the cast of Emmerdale straight from appearing in a stage production with a small theatre group. It marked her first television role. She admitted that acting in a soap opera was harder than she expected, saying "Most of the time I just walk around trying to look as if I know what I'm doing, even though I'm not really sure." She also felt "scared to death" watching her first appearance, but realised that her performance was not as bad as she had imagined. McGregor hoped to stay with the show for a long time, as she had enjoyed her first few weeks.

== Development ==
McGregor told Wendy Granditer from Inside Soap that her character "comes across as a bit of an oddity, but it's not really her fault." Describing Emily's background, McGregor said that Emily's mother died when she was two, and she lived a sheltered life with her father on his farm. Emily had limited contact with the outside world and was lacking in social skills, as she had no experience dealing with people, until she gains employment at the post office in the village. McGregor called her "incredibly nervous and naive." Discussing the future of her character, McGregor wanted Emily to stand up for herself, gain some more freedom from her father and live a bit. She also wanted Emily to get some new clothing, commenting "She only seems to have two skirts and three blouses, which she mixes and matches and always wears with a pink anorak." McGregor speculated that the clothes once belonged to Emily's mother.

Emily soon catches the attention of established regular Butch Dingle (Paul Loughran). McGregor hoped they would get it together, as she thought they brought out the best in each other. She told Granditer that Butch helps to boost Emily's confidence by taking a genuine interest in her. McGregor also pointed out that due to Emily's upbringing, she has no experience of boyfriends or sex, so she might be shocked by the extent of Butch's feelings for her. She hoped the writers would handle their romance tenderly. Butch and Emily's bludgeoning relationship is tested by Emily's disapproving father John Wylie (Seamus O'Neill). John wants to keep the couple apart and attacks Emily after catching her with Butch. Loughran said that Butch "feels helpless" about the situation, especially after John makes it sound like Butch was the one who hit Emily. The locals change their minds after Butch rescues John and Emily from a crashed car. John ends up in a coma, and Loughran joked that there is a part of Butch that is happy, as it means he can see Emily more easily. He commented "Butch sees it as a chance to show how genuine he is." The actor also described the romance between the characters as "very sweet and twee".

Emily and Butch's relationship progresses when they go on a date to an Italian restaurant in Leeds. McGregor called it "excitement overload" for Emily as she experiences several firsts, such as trying pizza. During their meal, Emily impulsively kisses Butch. McGregor said that while her character does not know anything about love, she enjoys being around Butch, adding "She's been shut away for so long and now she's in an exciting new world, with her first job and bloke."

McGregor took maternity leave from the serial in early 2006. She returned to filming in September and her return scenes were transmitted in October. In October 2007, it was announced that McGregor had quit the series in order to pursue new projects. Speaking to Janet Tansley of the Liverpool Echo, McGregor felt saddened to leave Emmerdale but felt that Emily had run her course and she wanted to focus on being a full-time mother. When asked if there were any similarities between her and Emily, McGregor replied "She’s an old fashioned girl with old fashioned values; I’d like to think I’m modern." McGregor made a brief return in 2008 for the serial's first gay wedding between Paul Lambert (Matthew Bose) and Jonny Foster (Richard Grieve).

== Storylines ==
Emily lived a sheltered life with her strict father, John Wylie. His wife, Claire died when Emily was two years old, and John became fiercely protective of his daughter and brought her up to be afraid of the outside world. However, when Emily takes a job at Viv Windsor's (Deena Payne) post office, Emily's life is transformed. Emily is drawn to Butch Dingle, but has to cope with her father's disapproval. During an argument, John attempts to strike Emily, but Butch punches him, scaring Emily in the process. John refuses to let Butch see Emily and they fight, leading to a car chase which ends with John flipping his Land Rover. Butch saves Emily and John before the car explodes, and John warms up to Butch.

When Butch is seriously injured in a bus crash, it soon becomes clear that he is going to die. He and Emily marry at his hospital bed before Butch dies. Alone again, Emily keeps a low profile until she meets Ed Willis (James Midgley). Although her friends think they are well suited, Emily does not feel anything romantic for him. On a night she is supposed to be seeing Ed, Emily has sex with her close friend Paddy Kirk (Dominic Brunt), who had also married into the Dingle family. Paddy and Emily's relationship goes from strength to strength. They get engaged and marry in a surprise wedding after their friends Marlon Dingle (Mark Charnock) and Tricia Dingle (Sheree Murphy) call off their nuptials at the last moment. Emily is desperate for children, so she and Paddy decide to become foster parents. After a couple of false starts, the couple forge a close bond with Debbie Jones (Charley Webb). But when it was revealed that Debbie is Charity (Emma Atkins) and Cain Dingle's (Jeff Hordley) daughter, Emily is bereft. However, she remains close to Debbie and supports her through tough times.

Paddy and Emily's marriage becomes strained, and Paddy has an affair with Viv. When she discovers the affair, Emily throws her husband out of their home and smashes up the Post Office. Emily decides to leave the village, but Daz Eden (Luke Tittensor) turns up and begs her to help Debbie who is giving birth. On arriving, Emily finds Debbie's baby in a bad way and her quick thinking saves her life. Debbie names her daughter Sarah and Emily decides to stay in the village. Unable to cope as a mother, Debbie leaves the childcare to Emily, who enjoys being involved in Sarah's life, but Cain accuses her of interfering. Emily finally has enough and makes plans to leave. Debbie decides she does not want to be a mother and begs Emily to take Sarah with her, which she does. Cain tries to find her after getting a lead that she has gone to Ireland, but by the time he got there, Emily was gone.

Emily returned to the village the following year and give Sarah to her father, Andy Sugden (Kelvin Fletcher). His sister Victoria Sugden (Hannah Midgley; Isabel Hodgins) notices Emily living in her old house. She is branded a child-snatcher and is largely ignored by the village for months. Emily tries to commit suicide by walking into the river with stones in her pocket, but she is saved by her former brother-in-law Sam Dingle (James Hooton), who soon develops romantic feelings for her. However, Emily does not feel the same way. She attempts to make a romantic advance towards Ashley Thomas (John Middleton). His wife Laurel Thomas (Charlotte Bellamy) then tries setting her up with Bishop George Postlethwaite (Peter Cartwright), who helps her to decide that she wants to train as a vicar. Emily says goodbye to her friends, especially Viv, and leaves the village for Manchester. She makes a brief return for Paul Lambert and Jonny Foster's commitment ceremony. She offers her condolences to the Thomases, whose baby son Daniel has died, and she leaves after attending his funeral.

== Reception ==
For her portrayal of Emily, McGregor received a nomination for Most Popular Newcomer at the 6th National Television Awards.

Daily Mirror critic Thomas Quinn observed that John and Emily "have the kind of father-daughter relationship that keeps Jerry Springer in fist fights." The Daily Record's Rick Fulton praised the pairing of Emily and Butch, saying "their relationship encapsulates what is best about Emmerdale, which is rapidly taking the humour and quaintness of old Corrie for itself." He called the couple "the Laurel and Hardy of the box" and said that "they put a smile on your face and make you root for them." The Guardian's Nancy Banks-Smith observed that everyone liked Butch and Emily and likened the pair to "the Start Rite kids, skipping innocently hand in hand into the sunrise". She also wrote that even by the show's standards, Emily is "a daft dimmock". Sarah Moolla of The People enjoyed the change in Emily's personality when she learned of Paddy's affair, writing "Hurrah for her! Meek Emily finally throws off the shackles of self-restraint. She wrecks Viv's shop, then really works up steam and tells Paddy their marriage is over."
