= Zoe Tate =

Fictional character from Emmerdale

- Emmerdale character
- Portrayed by: Leah Bracknell
- Duration: 1989–2005
- First appearance: 12 December 1989
- Last appearance: 22 September 2005
- Introduced by: Stuart Doughty
In-universe information
- Occupation: Vet; Businesswoman
- Father: Frank Tate
- Mother: Jean Tate
- Stepmother: Kim Tate
- Brothers: Chris Tate
- Half-brothers: Liam Hammond; Jamie Tate; Caleb Miligan
- Civil partner: Emma Nightingale (1996)
- Daughters: Jean Tate
- Nephews: Joe Tate; Noah Dingle

Zoe Tate is a fictional character from the British soap opera Emmerdale, played by Leah Bracknell. She made her first screen appearance during the episode broadcast on 12 December 1989. Zoe was involved in many major storylines during her time on the soap, including the deaths of her father Frank (Norman Bowler) and brother Chris (Peter Amory), the betrayal and departure of her stepmother Kim (Claire King), coming out as lesbian and a battle with schizophrenia. Zoe became the first lesbian character in a British soap opera when she came out in 1993. She departed on 22 September 2005. At the time of her departure, she was the longest-running female character in the programme, and the fourth longest in the show, after Jack Sugden (Clive Hornby), Alan Turner (Richard Thorp) and Eric Pollard (Chris Chittell).

== Casting and characterisation ==
Two years after graduating from the Webber Douglas Academy of Dramatic Art and having only done theatre and commercial work, Bracknell was cast in the role of Zoe. Bracknell initially signed a nine-month contract and she thought that was how long the job would last. She also stated: "I'd only ever been to Leeds once before, and I'd never really watched Emmerdale. It was strange, going from the dole with no money, to having a proper job." Bracknell made her first appearance as Zoe on 12 December 1989.

In March 2005, Bracknell announced she was to leave Emmerdale. A reporter for the BBC said she would leave in the autumn following a dramatic storyline involving Zoe. Bracknell said "I am looking forward to spending some time with my family and having the opportunity to pursue other projects. I will also be finishing my teaching diploma in yoga which is something I am passionate about." Series producer Kath Beedles said she wished Bracknell all the best for the future. Beedles added that Bracknell had made "a huge contribution to Emmerdale's ongoing success." Despite initial reports that it was to be a temporary break, Bracknell never returned to Emmerdale. She was diagnosed with terminal lung cancer in 2016. The actress died in September 2019.

== Development ==
Zoe arrived in the village a month after her father, Frank (Norman Bowler), stepmother Kim (Claire King) and brother Chris (Peter Amory) moved into Home Farm. Chris and Zoe's mother, Jean, died of cancer. Originally studying to be a veterinary surgeon, Zoe later started a veterinary practice in Emmerdale. In his 2002 book, 30 Years of Emmerdale, Lance Parkin noted that Zoe stuck up for what she believed in and was committed to animal rights and welfare.

Parkin described Zoe as "charitable and reasonable compared with the other Tates". He said while Zoe had a romantic streak, she also had a dark side, which often saw her become moody and angry. Bracknell said of her character in 2005: "She was very unpredictable which I liked. She wasn't a victim but she had lots of problems to deal with and at the same time she could be very Tate-like, ruthless and sometimes violent."

=== Sexuality ===
In early 1993, Zoe decided that she wanted more from her friendship with Archie Brooks (Tony Pitts), and the two later began a relationship. Zoe struggled to deal with the physical aspect of their relationship and she realised that she was a lesbian. Inside Soap's Richard Arnold commented that apart from a one-night stand with Michael Feldmann (Matthew Vaughan) and an older man, Patrick (Paul Darrow), whom she once brought home for Christmas, Zoe did not have much experience with men and the mystery behind that had finally been revealed. Bracknell explained that Zoe was not aware of her sexuality when she decided to have sex with Archie and said "Zoe wanted to sleep with Archie to put her fears to rest but she didn't do it to prove anything. She didn't count out the possibility that it could all work out with him." Bracknell added that Archie would be gutted by the news, but Zoe would want to remain his friend. Bracknell thought Zoe's sexuality would be "a big hurdle to cross" with her family, especially with Frank whom Zoe was very close to. Arnold reported that Zoe's bad luck with men was one reason why the show's producers felt the storyline could work for the character. He added that lesbianism had not been tackled before in a British soap. Of how the storyline unfolds, Bracknell explained "Zoe is quite feminine and not the obvious media stereotype of a lesbian, but the writers aren't taking any sort of moral stance. This is something that Zoe discovers gradually and it will be dealt with constructively, emotionally and positively."

=== Schizophrenia ===
Zoe was diagnosed with schizophrenia in 2002. According to Bracknell, this was the Emmerdale storyline she was most proud of portraying, "[b]ecause it dealt with a particular area of mental health and we did it over a relatively long period of time – about ten months – so there was a lot of research involved and the story was ongoing and changing. We had to get the nuts and bolts right and also it wasn't just about how it affected her [Zoe] but also the effect on her family."

== Storylines ==
Zoe's family move to Beckindale, while she is at university studying to be a veterinary surgeon. Following her graduation, Zoe also moves to the village and finds employment at a surgery in Hotten. Zoe helps deliver Elsa Feldmann's (Naomi Lewis) baby and she becomes involved in a protest march for animal rights. Zoe leaves the village when she gets a job as a flying vet in New Zealand. She returns the following year and helps Frank with his drinking problem, which he developed during the breakdown of his marriage to Kim. Zoe has a one-night stand with Elsa's brother, Michael (Matthew Vaughan), and a fling with Archie Brooks (Tony Pitts). Zoe eventually tells Archie that she is gay. Zoe meets interior designer Emma Nightingale (Rachel Ambler) and they begin a relationship. Zoe is almost raped by Ken Adlington (Douglas McFerran), but she fights him off and Emma tries to convince her to tell the police. Zoe refuses and Ken denies the attack happened. Frank gets revenge for Zoe by publicly humiliating Ken. Emma and Zoe decide to have a blessing. Emma's ex-girlfriend, Susie Wilde (Louise Heaney), turns up in the village and Zoe falls for her. Shortly after the blessing ceremony, Zoe leaves Emma for Susie. Zoe and Susie's relationship ends when Susie has an affair with another woman.

Zoe sets up a veterinary practice with Paddy Kirk (Dominic Brunt). She is devastated when she discovers Frank has died. She begins dating Sophie Wright (Jane Cameron), the nanny for Frank and Kim's son, James Tate (Sam Silson). They break up when Zoe wants to start a family but Sophie does not. Zoe initially resists the married Becky Cairns' (Sarah Neville) advances but later has a fling with her. She later develops a crush on truck driver, Frankie Smith (Madeleine Bowyer). Chris is kidnapped by Liam Hammond (Mark Powley), who reveals he is Frank's illegitimate child. Zoe rescues her brother and shoots Liam dead. Chris and Zoe try to cover up the crime and a jury reaches a verdict of lawful killing. Zoe then gets together with Frankie. Zoe is not happy when Chris moves Charity Dingle into Home Farm and gives her a job as his assistant. However, Charity and Zoe begin an affair, but when Zoe starts exhibiting obsessive behaviour towards Charity, it ends. Zoe starts blackmailing Charity, who confesses the affair to Chris. He chooses Charity over Zoe and she becomes depressed. Zoe then begins talking to her deceased father and she sets fire to the church. During one of her early schizophrenic episodes she ends up having sex with Scott Windsor (Ben Freeman) but has no memory of the event.

Zoe is sectioned and diagnosed with schizophrenia. She also discovers she is pregnant, with no idea how it happened, and she considers having an abortion. After seeing the baby during a scan, Zoe changes her mind and decides to put the baby up for adoption instead. Zoe later chooses to keep her baby and she gives birth to a daughter, Jean (Megan Pearson). Zoe returns to work at the veterinary surgery in the village and she hires Chloe Atkinson (Amy Nuttall) to be Jean's nanny. When Zoe notices Jean is crying more often, she takes her to the hospital and is told that Jean has a couple of broken ribs. Syd Woolfe (Nathan Gladwell) eventually confesses that Jean's injuries occurred when he and Chloe took their eyes off her when they were together. Zoe immediately fires Chloe. Scott realises that he is Jean's father and when Zoe finds out she becomes convinced that he raped her. Ashley Thomas (John Middleton) tells Zoe that she had in fact had sex with him before being diagnosed and Zoe accepts that she willingly had sex with Scott, albeit with no recollection of the incident.

Chris commits suicide and frames Charity for murder. Charity becomes aware that Zoe knows the truth and tries to seduce her. However, this does not change Zoe's mind and she testifies that Charity killed Chris. Charity is found guilty and sent to prison. She later gives birth to Zoe's nephew, Noah (Alfie Mortimer). Zoe, in her time of loneliness and feeling as if her daughter should have a mother and father in her life, has a very brief relationship with Scott; she tries to be romantic with him, but since she is obviously not attracted to him, she has an affair with Rachel Whatmore (Zoe Lambert). Charity agrees to give Zoe custody of Noah for the evidence that Chris committed suicide. Zoe tries to adopt Noah, but she is refused permission. Noah is later returned to his mother.

Zoe continues to run Home Farm and the businesses Chris left her, aided by estate manager Callum Rennie (Andrew Whipp) and nanny Effie Harrison (Phillipa Peak). Zoe plans to emigrate to New Zealand with Jean and Joseph. Zoe takes revenge on Scott after she learns he was going to betray her and lets him think that they are going to reunite and when he proposes, she turns him down, stating she would rather "put needles in her eyes". Scott then attacks Zoe and attempts to rape her. Initially trying to defend herself, Zoe injects him with ketamine. However, when Scott falls unconscious, she injects him again and is later arrested for attempted murder.

Effie reveals her feelings for Zoe and shortly before she is due to stand trial, Zoe plans to run away with her and the children. At the airport, Sadie King (Patsy Kensit) appears and blackmails Zoe into returning home and selling Home Farm to her at a reduced price. When Zoe returns home, Effie pleads with her to understand, but Zoe punches her. Zoe stands trial for attempted murder, and is freed when Paddy reveals that Scott was angry on the night of the attack and had threatened him.

Zoe packs up Home Farm and plans to leave with Callum, who refuses to stay behind with the Kings. Zoe and Callum break a gas pipe and set a timer to go off just as Tom (Ken Farrington), Jimmy (Nick Miles) and Max King (Charlie Kemp) arrive. Callum stops the car, and he and Zoe watch the house explode before driving away.

When Jamie Tate (now Alexander Lincoln), Zoe's half-brother, returned in 2019, he and Paddy talked about vets. Jamie said that the reason he wanted to be a vet was down to Zoe's days as a vet.

== Reception ==
For her portrayal of Zoe, Bracknell received a nomination for Most Popular Actress at the 8th National Television Awards in 2002. The character's last episode was an hour-long special that aired on 22 September 2005 and was watched by 8.58 million viewers. In 2006, Zoe's departure from the show was named Best Exit by the British Soap Awards.

Emmerdale received praise for the way it handled Zoe's sexuality. The Daily Mirror noted in 2002 that despite being a "schizophrenic lesbian vet", "Zoe Tate is actually a fairly credible character," and that "[a]fter 10 years, she has served her time as the only serious lesbian in soap." In the 2006 book The Way We Are Now: Gay and Lesbian Lives in the 21st Century, Jane Czyzselska wrote that lesbian characters in British television tended to be "issuized", but singled out Emmerdale as one of the few exceptions, "where vet Zoe Tate is subject to the crazy ideas of the script writers as much as the next heterosexual character." Sarah and Lee from AfterEllen said in 2010: "Actress Leah Bracknell left Emmerdale in 2005 and many waved a fond farewell to the longest running and possibly the best representation of a lesbian ever to grace British soap land. Emmerdale is still the only soap to allow its lesbian resident to exist without having to wear a sign around her neck that constantly reinforced her sexuality. Sometimes she was just having a drink, or working or visiting her brother. No other British soap opera has managed this since."

The Sunday Mail's Steve Hendry described Zoe as the "wealthy, lesbian vet [...] who brought more misery to the Dales than an outbreak of foot and mouth."
