= Peter Amory =

English actor (born 1964)

- Born: Peter Walton; 2 November 1964 (age 61); Norwich, Norfolk, England
- Occupation: Actor
- Years active: 1987–present
- Spouse: Claire King (m. 1994; sep. 2004)
- Children: 1

Peter Amory (born Peter Walton; 2 November 1964) is an English actor best known for playing the role of Chris Tate in ITV's soap opera Emmerdale. He was born in Norwich, Norfolk.

== Personal life ==
Amory was married to actress Claire King, who played his Emmerdale stepmother, Kim Tate, but the couple separated after ten years following his affair with co-star Samantha Giles; they remained friends. He has a son, Thomas, from a previous relationship. Amory was also friends with his former on-screen sister, the late Leah Bracknell (Zoe Tate).

== Filmography ==
=== Film ===
Year	Title	Role	Notes
2009	Tormented	Head Teacher	

=== Television ===
Year	Title	Role	Notes
1987	Boon	Parrot	Episode: "Texas Ranger"
1987	Casualty	Guy	Episode: "Lifelines"
1987–1989	Running Wild	Rob	Series regular
1989	Inspector Morse	DC Hilaire	Episode: "Deceived by Flight"
1989	Gentlemen and Players	Andrew	Episode: "Another Square Mile"
1989	Chelworth	Robbie	Episode: "The Rich Can Do Anything"
1989–2003	Emmerdale	Chris Tate	Series regular; 1,412 episodes
1990	The Chief	Detective Sergeant in Special Branch	1 episode
2005	Casualty	DS Jimmy Straker	2 episodes
2005	Heartbeat	Richard Bentham	Episode: "Duty of Care"
2008	The Royal Today	David Harrison	1 episode
2009	Crimes That Shook The World	Stewart Gull	Episode: "Suffolk Strangler"
2010	The Tudors	Earl of Rutland	Episode: "Something for You"
2014	Playhouse Presents	Constable	Episode: "Nightshift"
