= Kate McGregor =

English actress

Kate McGregor (born 1972) is an English actress known for her portrayal of the character Emily Kirk in British soap opera Emmerdale.

== Early life ==
Born in Yorkshire, England, McGregor attended the since defunct Bretton Hall College of Education.

== Career ==
McGregor is best known for her role as Emily Kirk in the ITV soap opera Emmerdale, making her television debut in May 1999. She would continue to play Kirk for the next eight years, taking maternity leave between December 2005 and October 2006, until she chose to exit the series in December 2007. McGregor stated that she chose to leave as she felt that her character had run its course and that she wanted to spend more time with her family. However, she would later assume the role again for a single episode in March 2008.

In 2007, McGregor took to the stage in the Liverpool Playhouse's second theatrical production of Tim Firth's The Flint Street Nativity, portraying Mary.

In January 2008, McGregor launched the Lancashire area's round of the Learning and Skills Council's North West Learner Awards.

== Personal life ==
A very private person, McGregor is very rarely in the public eye; her family unit includes her male partner (who is a teacher) and more than one child. She was married to Edward from 1996 to 1998. She has displayed a fondness for Ireland, praising the beauty of the coasts of Connemara and holidaying with her family in the lakelands of Fermanagh.

She is a fan of Joni Mitchell.

== Filmography ==
Television
Year	Title	Role	Notes
1999–2008	Emmerdale	Emily Kirk	Main role, later recurring role
2002	Kelly	Herself	Guest appearance
2007	Countdown	Herself	Guest appearance

== Award nomination ==
Year	Award	Category	For	Result
2000	National Television Awards	Most Popular Newcomer	Emmerdale	Nominated
