= Johnny Leeze =

British actor (1941–2020)

- Born: John Harold Glen; 31 December 1941; York, England
- Died: 25 October 2020 (aged 78); Grimsby, England
- Occupation: Actor
- Years active: 1982–2007
- Known for: Coronation Street; Emmerdale
- Spouses: Carol Helliwell (m. 1969; div. 1983) Julie Cruddas (m. 2004)
- Children: 2

John Harold Glen (31 December 1941 – 25 October 2020), known professionally as Johnny Leeze, was a British actor of television and film. He was perhaps best known for playing Harry Clayton in the British soap opera Coronation Street for a few months in 1985, and as Ned Glover in fellow British soap opera Emmerdale from 1994 to 1999. He appeared again in 2000, before leaving shortly afterwards.

== Career ==
Leeze's list of screen appearances dates back to 1982, when he made his television debut in the sitcom Open All Hours as a bit part. He also appeared in another British soap opera Coronation Street on three occasions playing a different part each time: he played Mr Slater in one episode in 1982; Harry Clayton for 35 episodes in 1985; and as Laurie Johnstone in one episode in 2005. He also appeared on the long-running sitcom Last of the Summer Wine on four occasions in 1983, 1986, 1991 and 2002, playing a different character each time. Leeze's other television credits include appearance in Play for Today, Juliet Bravo, All Creatures Great and Small, Heartbeat and Common As Muck, Cracker.

In 2000 he appeared as Inspector Cox in five episodes of the black comedy series The League of Gentlemen. Later he appeared in Phoenix Nights, Doctors, Early Doors, The Royal and most recently a 2007 appearance in Life on Mars. His only film appearance was in the 2001 film Blow Dry, in which he had a small part.

== Death ==
Leeze died on 25 October 2020, at the age of 78. He had tested positive for COVID-19 in the days before his death amid the COVID-19 pandemic in England.

== Film and television credits ==
- Open All Hours (1982) Television series...1 episode (The Man Whose Tyres Were Let Down)
- Play for Today (1982) Television series...3 episodes (Jim/orderly/porter)
- Coronation Street (1982) Soap Opera...1 episode (Mr Slater)
- Last of the Summer Wine (1983) Sitcom ...1 episode ('Our Kid' Colin)
- Hallelujah! (1983) Television series...1 episode (Landlord)
- The Outsider (1983) Television series...1 episode (Delivery Man)
- Juliet Bravo (1983) Television series...1 episode (Football Fan)
- Coronation Street (1985) Soap Opera..35 episodes (Harry Clayton)
- Last of the Summer Wine (1986) Sitcom ...1 episode (Meter Reader)
- All Creatures Great and Small (1988) Television series...1 episode (Lionel Brough)
- Stay Lucky (1989) Television series...2 episodes (2nd Warden)
- Chimera (1991) Television mini-series...1 episode (Billy Hamilton)
- Last of the Summer Wine (1991) Sitcom ...1 episode (Security Guard)
- Heartbeat (1993) Television series...1 episode (Pub Landlord)
- Common As Muck (1994) Television series...1 episode (Jack)
- Cracker (1994) Television series...1 episode (1st Manchester United Fan)
- Seaforth (1994) Television series...1 episode (Hodges)
- Emmerdale (1994–99, 2000) Soap Opera ....420 episodes (Ned Glover)
- The League of Gentlemen (2000) Television series...5 episodes (Inspector Cox)
- Blow Dry (2001) Feature film (Journalist)
- Phoenix Nights (2001) Television series...1 episode (Duggy Hayes)
- Doctors (2001) Television series...1 episode (Ray Bridges)
- Last of the Summer Wine (2002) Sitcom ...1 episode (Fifi's boyfriend)
- Early Doors (2003) Sitcom ....1 episode (Bill)
- The Royal (2003) Television series...1 episode (George)
- Coronation Street (2005) Soap Opera...1 episode (Laurie Johnstone)
- Life on Mars (2007) Television series...1 episode (Meter Man)
