= Norman Bowler =

English actor (born 1932)

- Born: Norman Clifford Bowler; 1 August 1932 (age 94); London, England
- Occupation: Actor
- Years active: 1961–2012
- Spouses: Henrietta Moraes (m. 1956, divorced) Berjourhi Bowler (divorced) Dianne Bowler (died 2012)
- Children: 2

Norman Clifford Bowler (born 1 August 1932) is an English retired actor, best known for his role as Frank Tate in the ITV soap opera Emmerdale.

== Early life ==
Norman Clifford Bowler was born on 1 August 1932 in London, England. His father, Clifford Norman Bowler (1899–1993), a watchmaker and jeweller, had a shop at 54 Mill Lane, West Hampstead, London.

== Career ==
Bowler was a regular cast member of the ATV soap series Harpers West One, playing the character of Roger Pike, and played a variety of bit parts and single episode roles on television throughout the 1960s, including an episode of Gideon's Way. He featured in an episode of The Avengers in 1967 entitled "Dead Man's Treasure" and starred alongside James Caan in the 1968 war film Submarine X-1, about World War II British midget submarines.

From 1966 to 1976, Bowler played Det. Chief Inspector Harry Hawkins for the entire run of the BBC TV police drama Softly, Softly (later Softly, Softly: Task Force). He also appeared as Titinius in Julius Caesar (1970), as Saturninus in Jesus of Nazareth (1977), as Bill Smugs in The Island of Adventure (1982), and as Moose in the Terence Hill film They Call Me Renegade (1987). After a continuing role in Crossroads from 1986 to 1987, he later played the part of Frank Tate in the ITV soap opera Emmerdale from November 1989 to May 1997. He also voiced a Gypsy in The Wind in the Willows episode "Gypsy Toad".

Bowler has been active in charity work and adult education. With his third wife, Dianne, he spent several years at Auroville International Township in Tamil Nadu, India. There he engaged in development work with people in the surrounding Tamil villages and often entertained the village children.

In August 2012, Bowler released a recorded reading of Samuel Taylor Coleridge's Rime of the Ancient Mariner to raise money for The Auroville Trust.

== Personal life ==
Bowler became a member of the 1950s Soho set alongside John Minton, Francis Bacon and Daniel Farson. There he met Henrietta Moraes, who divorced her first husband, Michael Law, and married Bowler. This marriage ended in 1956. The pair had two children, although many years later it transpired that the father of one was actually Colin Tennant, 3rd Baron Glenconner. Berjourhi Bowler, his second wife, mother of Tamara, and Bowler were divorced in 1969, after 10 years of marriage.

Bowler's third wife Dianne died in December 2012.

== Filmography ==
- Tom Thumb (1958) – (uncredited)
- Biggles (1960, TV series) – Ian Manton
- Letters from the Dead (1968, TV mini-series) – Peter Allery
- Submarine X-1 (1969) – Sub. Lt. Pennington
- Softly, Softly (TV series) 1966 – DS Harry Hawkins
- Julius Caesar (1970) – Titinius
- Jesus of Nazareth (1977, TV mini-series) – Saturninus
- The Island of Adventure (1982) – Bill Smugs
- The Forgotten Story (1983, TV series) – Ship's officer
- They Call Me Renegade (1987) – Moose
- Destroying Angel (1990) – Tom Berto
- Living in Hope (2002) – Dad (final film role)
