= Paul Loughran =

Northern Irish actor (born 1969)

- Born: Paul Anthony Martin Loughran; 7 July 1969 (age 56); Belfast, County Antrim, Northern Ireland
- Occupation: Actor
- Years active: 1992–present
- Notable work: Emmerdale
- Awards: Soap Awards BAFTA

Paul Anthony Martin Loughran (born 7 July 1969 in Belfast) is a Northern Irish actor. He was educated at Methodist College Belfast. He is best known for portraying Butch Dingle in ITV soap opera Emmerdale in which his character died in a bus crash with friend Pete Collins. After that he appeared in many other TV series such as Heartbeat. On 24 August 2016, it was announced that Loughran had been cast as Darryl Perkins, the father of Craig Tinker (Colson Smith), in Coronation Street.

== Filmography ==
Selected television and film roles
Year	Title	Role	Notes
1987	Scout	O'Toole	Credited as Paul Ryder
1992	The Darling Buds of May	Policeman	1 episode
1992	Coronation Street	PC Goldman	1 episode
1994–2000	Emmerdale	Butch Dingle	Main role; 170+ episodes
2000	The Bill	Dean Burgess	1 episode
2002	Auf Wiedersehen, Pet	Drug dealer	1 episode
2002	Puckoon	Policeman	Feature film
2003	I Fought the Law	Billy Wilson	TV film
2003	The Royal	Malcolm Wilson	1 episode
2003–2009	Blue Murder	DI Scott Lawson	Recurring role
2005	Heartbeat	Charlie	1 episode
2005	The Baby War	Sgt. Taylor	TV film
2005	Ideal	Policeman	1 episode
2016	Jericho	Mr. Jarvis	1 episode
2016	Coronation Street	Darryl Tinker	Recurring role
2017	Casualty	Geoff	1 episode
