= Chris Tate =

Fictional character from Emmerdale

- Emmerdale character
- Portrayed by: Peter Amory
- Duration: 1989–2003
- First appearance: 14 November 1989
- Last appearance: 18 September 2003
- Introduced by: Stuart Doughty
In-universe information
- Occupation: Businessman
- Father: Frank Tate
- Mother: Jean Tate, Sr.
- Stepmother: Kim Tate
- Sisters: Zoe Tate
- Half-brothers: Jamie Tate; Liam Hammond; Caleb Miligan
- Wife: Kathy Merrick (1991–1995); Rachel Hughes (1995–1997); Charity Dingle (2001–2003)
- Sons: Joe Tate; Noah Dingle
- Stepdaughters: Debbie Dingle
- Nephews: Nicky Miligan; Thomas Tate
- Nieces: Jean Tate; Millie Tate

Chris Tate is a fictional character from the British ITV soap opera Emmerdale, played by Peter Amory. The character made his first appearance on 14 November 1989, when he arrived in the village alongside the rest of the Tate family – his father Frank (Norman Bowler), stepmother Kim (Claire King) and younger sister Zoe (Leah Bracknell).

Initially a decent man, Chris was left permanently resentful of his life after a plane crash in 1993 left him paralysed from the waist down. His storylines on the show included his numerous feuds, including one with his father Frank; a longstanding rivalry with his stepmother, Kim; and his marriages with local villager Kathy Merrick (Malandra Burrows), her best friend Rachel Hughes (Glenda McKay), and scheming ex-prostitute Charity Dingle (Emma Atkins). Towards the end of his story arc, Chris learned that he had an inoperable brain tumour and used this opportunity to get revenge on Charity for cheating on him with her cousin Cain Dingle (Jeff Hordley). After wasting all of his money to ensure that Charity would be left with nothing, Chris killed himself to frame her for his murder – with the character making his final appearance on 18 September 2003 as a corpse following his death an episode earlier.

== Characterisation ==
Chris is a shrewd businessman living in the shadow of his father, Frank. After [Frank's] death, Chris took over the Tate business and never lets anything or anyone get in his way.

— itv.com on Chris.

Chris was initially portrayed as a decent man, but was left permanently resentful of his life after a plane crash in 1993 left him paralyzed from the waist down. The character then became much more jaded and bitter, often using his intelligence and assets to exact revenge on those he perceived to have hurt him. Radio Times described Chris as a "wealthy bad boy" and "one of the most complex, conniving characters in Emmerdale history."

== Storylines ==
Chris Tate first arrives in Beckinsdale in November 1989 when his father, Frank (Norman Bowler), and stepmother, Kim, buy Home Farm. He is the managing director of his father's haulage firm. He had owned a flat in Skipdale, but moved into Home Farm soon afterwards to be closer to his love interest Kathy Merrick (Malandra Burrows). It quickly becomes clear that Chris has a tense relationship with his father, partly due to the death of Chris's mother, Jean, from cancer five years ago. Another reason is Frank's remarriage to his secretary Kim, who is only a few years older than Chris and had been having an affair with Frank whilst Jean was ill. Despite the turbulence between father and son, Chris is close to his younger sister Zoe. When Frank admits he had helped Jean die when she was terminally ill, Chris initially accused Frank and Kim of plotting his mother's death. Chris was also unimpressed when Kim persuaded Frank to have an operation to reverse his vasectomy.

Eventually Chris and Kathy begin dating and Chris writes a song for Kathy to sing at a village concert, 'Just This Side of Love' (which was released as a single sung by Malandra Burrows). They briefly split up over Chris's gambling habits after he lost his motorbike in a poker match to Frank's closest friend Alan Turner (Richard Thorp), but reunite and marry in November 1991. The marriage begins to break down a year later when Chris finds out that Kathy knew that Kim was two-timing Frank with the latter's acquaintance Neil Kincaid (Brian Deacon). In the row that follows, Chris nearly hits Kathy and later confides in Zoe that he is worried that he has inherited their father's temper. Chris also admits that, although he wants children, Kathy does not. When Frank relapses into his old alcoholism, Chris sees an opportunity to gain control of the business by buying Kim's shares. His plan to do so involves remortgaging his and Kathy's cottage. Kathy soon finds out about this when Frank discovers what his son has done and accuses Kathy of conspiring with Chris against him. To Chris's surprise, however, Zoe joins forces with Frank to vote down Chris against his expectations Kathy, unhappy with his actions, begins to cheat on Chris by having a fling with American wine merchant Josh Lewis (Peter Warnock), and plans to leave Chris by the end or 1993.

On the night before New Year's Eve 1993, Chris spends the evening in Skipdale with a friend – unaware that Kathy is planning to leave him that night. He is supposed to pick up Kathy and meet Zoe in The Woolpack, but goes straight to the pub and is there when a plane crashes into the village. Chris is trapped in the wreckage of the wine bar, with his family thinking he is still in Skipdale. He is eventually discovered by Josh, and is dug out overnight. He has spinal injuries and is left paraplegic.

It is then Chris exhibits a ruthless Machiavellian streak; he starts off feeling bitter about being disabled and his marriage with Kathy starts to collapse because of his volatile behaviour, especially when realises that Kathy has stayed with him out of duty only. Soon enough Chris forms a bond with her best friend Rachel Hughes (Glenda McKay), whose brother Mark died in the plane crash, and she begins giving him swimming lessons. Their friendship steadily becomes an affair and Kathy finds out when she sees them kissing on their third wedding anniversary. When Kathy finds out Rachel is expecting Chris's child, she slaps Chris and throws him out of his wheelchair.

The following summer, Rachel goes into labour prematurely not long after discovering that her stepfather Joe Sugden (Frazer Hines) has died. She gives birth to a baby boy named Joseph Mark after her stepfather and brother. Chris helps Rachel raise their son and the pair start to fall out with Frank over his interference with Joseph. On 7 December 1995, Chris and Rachel get married – though Joe's brother Jack Sugden (Clive Hornby) and his wife Sarah (Alyson Spiro) are the only attendees due to Frank's refusal to attend the ceremony. However, the marriage lasted less than a year after Chris returns to Frank's business and becomes just as money-ambitious as his father, much to Rachel's disapproval. They soon divorce after Chris indirectly causes Rachel to undergo financial problems, and the pair end up squabbling over their rights to Joseph.

By this point, Chris has become arch-enemies with his stepmother Kim. Their feud continues by the time Frank divorces Kim after her affair with Kathy's new fiancé, Dave Glover (Ian Kelsey), is exposed. Dave soon dies after rescuing Kim's infant son James from a fire at Home Farm over Christmas 1996. In the new year, Kim loses everything when Frank is revealed to be James's father – not Dave as she had hoped – and she soon leaves the village under mysterious circumstances. When it later becomes apparent that Kim has died after her car and body are identified in the quarry, Chris relishes in her supposed death. However, he is left outraged when Frank is arrested and imprisoned because of the circumstances surrounding Kim's death. Chris also discovers that Kim has conned him out of £350,000 in a business transaction between them and wishes that he had killed her for this.

In 1997, it is revealed that Kim is actually alive and had faked her death in order to get revenge on Frank by implicating him in her supposed disappearance and death. She returns to the village to confront Frank and ultimately allows him to die after causing an argument that ends with Frank having a fatal a heart attack. On the day of Frank's funeral, Chris and Zoe discover that Kim is alive. He speculates that she killed Frank and swears revenge on Kim for his father's death, especially when Kim later inherits everything in Frank's will. This in turn escalates the animosity between Chris and Kim, despite the fact they have to collaborate with managing both the family business and Home Farm Estate.

A few months later Chris is suspicious when Kim gets engaged to Frank's business partner Steve Marchant (Paul Opacic) and the pair become closely associated with a wealthy aristocrat named Lord Alex Oakwell (Rupam Maxwell). However, on the night of Kim and Steve celebrating their engagement party, Alex Oakwell ends up causing the death of Zoe's best friend Linda Fowler (Tonicha Jeronimo) in a road accident. Although Lord Alex is killed a year later for his actions, thanks to Linda's brother Roy (Nicky Evans) seeking justice for her murder, Linda's death has further instigated her family's resentment towards Chris over an earlier incident. A few months before when Frank was still alive, Chris had sexually harassed Linda to the point where he tried to rape her one night. He later planned to have Linda and her husband Biff (Stuart Wade) evicted from the family house. However, when Linda's father Ned Glover (Johnny Leeze) learns about her ordeal, he furiously kidnaps Chris and attempts to kill him at the quarry – nearly doing so until Linda and Biff, with his wife Jan (Roberta Kerr), talk him out of it.

In 1998, Chris is pleased to learn that Kim and Steve are planning to sell Home Farm due to their financial problems not long after the pair get married. He seeks help from Lord Alex Oakwell's ex-spouse Tara Cockburn (Anna Brecon) in her partnership with the Tates to grant him ownership of Home Farm. This works successfully, and Chris sends Kim and Steve packing as they move out of Home Farm. A few months later, Chris seeks his chance to get revenge on Kim for his father's death when both she and Steve end up facing a potential prison stint for stealing a horse from their business competitors, which, as a result, got Kathy hospitalized. Steve is convicted to a 12-year prison sentence while Kim is set to face the same fate once her bail ends. That night, Chris lures Kim into Home Farm for a confrontation as he attempts to bring Kim to justice for killing his father. When Chris tries to blackmail her into giving him custody of James, she hits Chris over the head and tips him out of his wheelchair. Kim then confesses to Chris that she had watched his father die, before pouring whisky over him and then escaping the village with James by helicopter. This is the last time Kim and Chris ever crossed paths.

In 1999, Chris hires his lawyer Laura Johnstone (Louise Beattie) to help manage the events of his company's business operations. At one stage, she helps him reclaim Home Farm from the attempted usurpation of ownership from conman Eric Pollard (Chris Chittell) and his old lover Stella Jones (Stephanie Schonfield). Soon enough, Chris ends up alienating most of the village and motives are eventually questioned when he later goes missing. Unbeknownst to the villagers, Chris has been kidnapped and is being held hostage by a recently hired employee named Liam Hammond. The kidnapping lasts for a few months, during which Liam reveals himself to be Frank's long-lost son – thus making him Chris's half-brother. Chris gradually forms a bond with Liam and is upset when he was shot dead by Zoe after she got caught up in the same situation. That same year, Chris is distraught to learn that Rachel has died even though the result allows him to get custody of Joseph; it later transpires that Rachel was murdered by her former boyfriend Graham Clark (Kevin Pallister), who had previously killed his first wife before proceeding to embark on a relationship with Kathy after Rachel's death – only for his crimes to be exposed before he eventually kills himself. Chris helps Kathy get through her ordeal with Graham.

In 2000, Chris faces another major crisis when one of his lorries ends up colliding with a village minibus – thus causing a devastating road collusion that leaves Kathy among several residents critically injured. Kathy survives along with some others, but four people are killed in the crash, including local resident Butch Dingle (Paul Loughran) and one of Chris's drivers named Pete. Despite the tragic circumstances, Chris opts to keep his business afloat even if it that means resorting to claiming negligence for his company's role in the accident. This is quickly opposed by Kathy and Zoe as well as Chris' business associate Sean Reynolds (Stephen McGann). However, despite facing potential public backlash for this, Chris adamantly stands by his decision – which instigates his feud with Butch's cousin and the village's would-be hardman Cain Dingle (Jeff Hordley). Their conflict first emerges after Chris causes disruption in a press statement regarding the accident, when he orders two of his henchman to target Butch's stepmother Lisa (Jane Cox) after she admits to her involvement in the lorry crash. In response, Cain punches Chris in front of everyone.

In 2001, Chris embarks on a relationship with Cain's other cousin Charity Dingle (Emma Atkins) – a former prostitute – and they soon plan on getting married towards the end of the year. However, Zoe appears to dislike Charity and later tells her it was because of her history. Soon enough, though, Zoe begins to fancy Charity herself and even offers her money to leave Chris. Tensions continue to rise between them when Charity responds by kissing her. Eventually, the pair begin a lesbian tryst that would last for several months behind Chris' back. Charity becomes alarmed by Zoe's obsessive behaviour and tries to end the fling, but Zoe secretly records Charity confessing to the betrayal and blackmails her into signing a prenuptial agreement so that she would always have a hold over her. Charity then confesses all to Chris, and he surprises her by forgiving her and ripping up the agreement. The pair later get married despite opposition from both Cain and Zoe, while Cain's father and Lisa's husband, Zak (Steve Halliwell), reluctantly accepts this – though not before he warns Chris about the consequences should he mess Charity about.

In 2002, Chris continues to dismiss Zoe's forgiveness for complicating things in his relationship with Charity. This soon changes, though, when Zoe ends up exhibiting signs of unstable behaviour and mental issues that culminate in her setting fire to the local church. Despite being rescued from the fire, Zoe gets sectioned in the process after being diagnosed with schizophrenia. Chris supports Zoe through her ordeal and forgives her.

In 2003, Chris is shocked when Zoe falls pregnant and gives birth to a baby girl, whom she names Jean (Megan Pearson) in honour of her and Chris' late mother. He is later appalled to learn that Jean's father is wayward bad boy Scott Windsor (Ben Freeman), and furiously accuses him of raping Zoe due to her being a lesbian as well as suffering from a schizophrenic episode when Jean was conceived. Wanting revenge, Chris begins a hate campaign against Scott. This involves Chris evicting Scott and his friends from his house, having his garage vandalised, increasing Scott's rent, and arranging for the garage to be set on fire. Later on, he bribes a prostitute named Yolanda Howie (Charlotte Faber-Scott) to date Scott and then implicate him under false rape charges. This works successfully until Zoe eventually learns the extent of Chris's vendetta and, also discovering that Scott had never raped anyone to begin with, pays Yolanda to drop the charges.

By then, Chris's marriage has grown complicated and his feud with Cain has intensified. This is due to the revelation that Charity had a baby when she was 13 and gave it up adoption. Later, a preteen schoolgirl named Debbie Jones (Charley Webb) arrives in the village and claims that Charity is her mother. Not only is this true, but Debbie's father is revealed to be Cain, as well – even though Debbie had been earlier adopted by Butch's wife Emily (Kate McGregor) and her new husband Paddy Kirk (Dominic Brunt) as the child's foster parents. When Chris learns about this, he grows increasingly paranoid with the thought that Charity would cheat on him with Cain, and that their parenthood of Debbie would complicate things in the process. Chris soon orders his right-hand man Terry Woods (Billy Hartman) to spy on them. At first, Terry realises that Chris's paranoia is getting out of hand, but this later turns out to be true when the pair end up catching Charity giving Cain a passionate kiss.

Chris' reaction to Charity's affair with Cain is partly sidetracked when his paranoid behaviour evokes a starting discovery – that he has an inoperable brain tumour with only months to live. Chris later admits this to Zoe when she learns of Charity's betrayal, before requesting that neither she nor Terry informs anyone about this. At the same time, Chris throws Charity out of Home Farm and plans to divorce her. He soon begins frittering away all his money to ensure Charity would be left with nothing. When his condition deteriorates, Chris plans to settle his score with Charity once and for all by inviting her to Home Farm for a chat. As he prepares himself for this, Chris bids a tearful goodbye to Zoe and Joseph before thanking Terry for standing by him at all costs. When Charity arrives, she desperately seeks to rebuild their marriage – but Chris makes it clear that he will never forgive her for cheating on him with Cain and proposes a morbid toast, to "the death of [their] our marriage". When Chris drinks his champagne, he suddenly collapses onto the floor and dies in the same spot where his father had died six years previously; his last word to Charity is "whore".

Following Chris's death, Charity discovers his brain tumour before she ends up getting arrested on suspicion of his murder; Chris had, in fact, poisoned his own drink in order to frame Charity for his death as revenge for her affair with Cain. In 2004, Charity goes on trial for Chris's murder and Zoe is determined to get her sent down for it. This initially becomes the case when Charity is found guilty and sentenced to life imprisonment for Chris's death. Later, Charity gives birth to a baby boy in prison and names the infant Noah (Alfie Mortimer); she soon alerts Zoe to this and urges her to do a DNA test, which soon confirms Noah's father to be Chris. Thereafter, Charity forces Zoe to have her released from prison and drop the charges in exchange for selling her rights regarding Noah to Zoe. In doing so, Zoe has Charity released from prison.

In 2017, Chris's now-adult son Joe (now Ned Porteous) appears in the village – first seeming to be a successful entrepreneur named "Tom Waterhouse" who begins dating Debbie. In 2018, he reveals his identity to Debbie when it transpires that he is seeking revenge against Charity for his father's death. A few days later, Charity tells Noah (now Jack Downham) the truth of how Chris died and that he framed her for murder. A few months later, Kim returns to the village and is revealed to be the mastermind behind Joe's revenge against the Dingles. She mentions Chris on several occasions to the Dingles along with her third husband Graham Foster (Andrew Scarborough), who has earlier been seen to have helped raise Joseph ever since he partnered up with Zoe years after Chris' death.

== Reception ==
Chris' on-screen death on 18 September 2003 was watched by 10.25 million viewers. The character was nominated for Best Villain at the 2004 British Soap Awards. In 2014, HuffPost named Chris as one of the 15 soap opera villains "we love to hate the most". He came in third in CBS Drama's 2018 list of the Top 5 Soap Opera Villains, with the author noting: "Chris was originally a decent chap but after a plane crash rendered him paralysed from waist down he turned into a bitter person and even in his dying breaths whilst committing suicide he framed his wife for murder."

== See also ==
- List of soap opera villains
