= List of Emmerdale characters introduced in 1998 =

The following is a list of characters that first appeared in the British soap opera Emmerdale in 1998, by order of first appearance.

== Jed Outhwaite ==
Jed Outhwaite
- Emmerdale character
- Portrayed by: Tony Melody
- First appearance: 1 January 1998
- Last appearance: 24 June 1998
- Introduced by: Mervyn Watson
In-universe information
- Occupation: Farmer
- Daughters: Heather Hutchinson
- Granddaughters: Lyn Hutchinson; Kirsty Hutchinson

Jed Outhwaite is the father of Heather Hutchinson (Siobhan Finneran) and the grandfather of Lyn Hutchinson (Sally Walsh) and Kirsty Hutchinson (Anne Marie-Jowett). He and his daughter were brought back in contact by Lyn after no contact for 18 years. Jed was a farmer and his farm was owned by the Tate Family. Kim Tate (Claire King) tried to evict Jed, but he wouldn't move. In February 1998, Jed had a heart attack and Lyn found him unconscious, so he was rushed to Hotten General Hospital. He made a full recovery and moved away to pastures new.

== Heather Hutchinson ==
Heather Hutchinson
- Emmerdale character
- Portrayed by: Siobhan Finneran
- First appearance: 5 February 1998
- Last appearance: 20 August 1998
- Introduced by: Mervyn Watson
In-universe information
- Occupation: Barmaid
- Father: Jed Outhwaite
- Daughters: Lyn Hutchinson; Kirsty Hutchinson

Heather Hutchinson (née Outhwaite) is the daughter of farmer Jed Outhwaite (Tony Melody) and mother of Lyn Hutchinson (Sally Walsh) and Kirsty Hutchinson (Anne Marie-Jowett). She arrived in Emmerdale a month after her father after her daughter, Lyn reconciled them after no contact for 18 years. Whilst in Emmerdale, Heather had an affair with Terry Woods (Billy Hartman). As he is about to end the affair, she told him she was quitting her barmaid job in The Woolpack and was moving to Hotten with Kirsty and Lyn.

== Barbara Kirk ==
Barbara Kirk
- Emmerdale character
- Portrayed by: Judi Jones
- Duration: 1998–2000, 2002
- First appearance: 14 April 1998
- Last appearance: 10 January 2002
- Introduced by: Mervyn Watson (1998); Kieran Roberts (1999, 2000); Steve Frost (2002)
In-universe information
- Husband: Kenneth Kirk (backstory)
- Sons: Paddy Kirk; Colin Kirk
- Granddaughters: Grace Dingle; Eve Dingle
- Nephews: Jason Kirk; Ross Kirk

Barbara Kirk is the mother of Paddy Kirk. She appeared on and off from 1998 to 2002.

Barbara is deeply unhappy that her son Paddy has got involved with Mandy Dingle, and pays Mandy to stay away from Paddy. When Mandy's family finds out about this, they decide she should marry her cousin Butch and take the money. However, in 2000 Paddy and Mandy marry. When the marriage collapses, she is there to tell him that she told him so.

In 2002, Barbara makes it known that she doesn't approve of Emily Dingle and when they both stand up to her, she departs but continues to plague them with phone calls. Emily later gets a call saying that she is ill but Paddy dismisses it as her crying wolf again. To celebrate their engagement, they plan to go to Ireland on holiday and he decides to visit his mother beforehand. On arrival at her house, she was nowhere to be found and Paddy is later informed by his cousin Jason that she had died. Pills were found near the body and Paddy believed that she had committed suicide until a coroner's report said it was natural causes.

== Laura Johnstone ==
Laura Johnstone
- Emmerdale character
- Portrayed by: Louise Beattie
- Duration: 1998–2000
- First appearance: 28 July 1998
- Last appearance: 10 August 2000
- Introduced by: Mervyn Watson
In-universe information
- Occupation: Lawyer

Laura Johnstone, played by Louise Beattie, made her first screen appearance in 1998. Laura was a lawyer who began an affair with Chris Tate (Peter Amory). Lynn McPherson of the Sunday Mail described Laura as a "tough-talking character" who became a favourite with Emmerdale viewers when she broke up with Chris. Beattie chose to quit her role in 2000. The following year, McPherson reported Beattie had been inspired by Laura's job as a lawyer and had enrolled at a law school.

After being hired by Lady Tara Oakwell (Anna Brecon), Laura moves into the village. Zoe Tate (Leah Bracknell) asks Laura to be the Tate's legal counsellor and she later negotiates the sell off of Home Farm. Laura falls for Zoe's brother Chris, just as he starts to fall in love with his ex-wife, Kathy Glover (Malandra Burrows). Laura and Chris eventually begin a relationship, but she breaks up with him. Laura handles Lady Tara's divorce and she receives a large amount of money. She then leaves the village.

== Lord Michael Thornfield ==
Lord Michael Thornfield
- Emmerdale character
- Portrayed by: Malcolm Stoddard
- First appearance: 22 May 1998
- Last appearance: 16 September 1998
- Introduced by: Mervyn Watson
In-universe information
- Wife: Lady Tara Oakwell (1998–1999)

Lord Michael Thornfield, played by Malcolm Stoddard, made his first screen appearance in 1998. Michael is an old friend of Lady Tara Oakwell (Anna Brecon). She turns to him for consolation when she is knocked back by Biff Fowler (Stuart Wade). Michael falls for Tara and eventually proposes to her. Commenting on Michael's proposal speech, Tony Purnell of the Daily Mirror said "Mills & Boon must be supplying his script." Tara accepts Michael's proposal as she is facing mounting debts. They marry on 16 September 1998 and Tara soon learns Michael has a temper. The couple decide to leave the village together and go overseas. Tara and Michael later divorce.

== Tricia Dingle ==
Tricia Dingle
- Emmerdale character
- Portrayed by: Sheree Murphy
- Duration: 1998–2004
- First appearance: 16 September 1998
- Last appearance: 8 January 2004
- Introduced by: Mervyn Watson
In-universe information
- Other names: Tricia Stokes; Tricia Fisher
- Mother: Steph Stokes
- Husband: Joe Fisher (2000–2002); Marlon Dingle (2003–2004)
- Grandfathers: Alan Turner
- Uncles: Terence Turner

Patricia "Tricia" Dingle (also Stokes and Fisher) was the daughter of Steph Forsythe (Lorraine Chase) and the granddaughter of Alan Turner (Richard Thorp). Tricia arrived at The Woolpack out of the blue. Alan, who has had troubled relationships with his offspring, didn't recognise her initially, but quickly took her to his heart. She was a big hit behind the bar of The Woolpack, especially with the men of Emmerdale, and could wrap Alan around her little finger. Tricia was a born tease, and immediately caught the attention of Terry Woods (Billy Hartman), especially after she took him breakfast in bed dressed in a skimpy nightie. He was so smitten he took her shopping and forked out for a sexy new dress. This got him into trouble with Alan for missing his shift at the Woolpack. Terry was convinced she felt the same, and was crushed when she rejected his advances.

Tricia tried to help out in the Woolpack but contributed towards its destruction when fireworks she bought set alight and burned down the pub. She slept with both Terry and Scott Windsor (Ben Freeman), but was mortified both when Scott told Terry about their fling and when Terry spilled the beans to the drinkers in the village hall. She felt terribly guilty about her treatment of Terry and was sorry when he came back to the village on Christmas Day only to discover the tragic news about his friend Vic Windsor (Alun Lewis).

Tricia was put out when Alan appointed Bernice Blackstock (Samantha Giles) bar manager instead of her (tried her best to get the job and even put together a CV); had a mud fight with Mandy Dingle (Lisa Riley); discovers Bernice's plan and laughs at her with Mandy; is surprised when Scott cannot perform in bed with her; goes to the vets' ball but doesn't enjoy being groped all night; thinks Bernice made Gavin Ferris up and is a lunatic; sleeps with Gavin behind Bernice's back; comforts Roy Glover (Nicky Evans) before his wedding; tries to get the village to buy The Woolpack; flirts with Chris Tate (Peter Amory) in the hope that he will give her the money; wants to plan her own theme night to prove she is better than Bernice. Hollywood night went well, until a drag queen Marilyn Monroe impersonator turned up and caused a near-riot. Tricia realised she couldn’t make cocktails either, and had to beg Bernice to help out. She decided to get her revenge on Bernice at the summer fayre, where they both had rival beer tents. She hitched Bernice's marquee to Jack Sugden's car and pulled it down.

Since it became clear Bernice was going to take over the pub, she and Tricia had buried the hatchet somewhat. Tricia wasn't silly though – she blackmailed Gavin to ensure that she and her granddad could stay on at the pub after the takeover – and she "forgot" to mention that Bernice's name was spelled wrongly on the new pub sign. She was also not keen on Bernice's feng shui fad – or, as she called it, "chop suey"!

Paddy Kirk's (Dominic Brunt) cousin Jason (James Carlton) arrived in the village just before Christmas. They hit it off straight away and she thought finally that he could be the man for her. However, Jason had a secret – he was gay and had promised Paddy he wouldn't tell anyone. Tricia and Bernice found him out in the most shocking way – at Marlon Dingle's (Mark Charnock) Aladdin night in the Woolpack, the two women found Jason and Gavin kissing in Bernice's bedroom. Tricia tried to be strong for Bernice, but was wracked with guilt all over Christmas about her own fling with Gavin. Alan told her to stop feeling so sorry for herself.

In December 2000, she married Australian Joe Fisher, the partner of her ex-boyfriend Jason, in a marriage of convenience so he could remain in the country. In 2002, Tricia's mother Steph (Lorraine Chase) arrived and she also started dating Marlon. They got engaged and planned to marry on 16 October. However, when the day arrived, it was full of mishaps, such as chewing gum getting stuck in Tricia's hair and eventually injuring her neck when she turned her head around too fast, so Tricia called it off and Paddy married Emily Dingle in their place. Marlon and Tricia eventually married on Valentine's Day 2003.

Tricia got the chance to work on a Bollywood movie and she and Marlon left the village in April. But, Marlon returned a few days later after problems with getting into the country. During Tricia's absence, he had a one-night stand with his distant cousin Charity (Emma Atkins). Tricia returned in November that year and Marlon constantly acted odd around her, fearing that she will find out. Eventually, he told her and Tricia struggled to forgive her philandering husband. Tricia decided to leave Marlon. In response, Marlon wrote a list of 101 things he loved about her. Once she was ready to leave at New Year, just as a severe storm arrived, Diane Blackstock (Elizabeth Estensen) gave her the list. As she reads through the letter whilst waiting in the bus stop and then in a phone box, she finally realised how much Marlon loved her and returned to the Woolpack. However, disaster struck when a nearby tree was hit by lightning, making Tricia stumble back, while another bolt hit the Woolpack roof and caused a window to collapse down on Tricia and sending the chimney to fall through the ceiling and into the packed pub. Diane and Marlon discovered Tricia lying under the rubble. Soon enough, the emergency services were called and Tricia was airlifted to hospital. Marlon followed suit in Diane's car and him, Steph and Alan arrived at the hospital, where the doctor informed them that Tricia had sustained massive internal injuries and was in a critical condition. While Tricia lay unconscious, she went into cardiac arrest. The consultant summoned Marlon to his office and Marlon was told that Tricia was brain dead and the only option was to switch off her machine. Marlon was conflicted over this decision, until eventually he decided it was for the best. Tricia died and her organs were donated. In the years afterwards, Marlon still took Tricia's death hard. In 2007, Marlon states to second wife Donna that when he was on the verge of death after being shot, he had a vision of Tricia that beckoned him to live. She was mentioned in 2013 at Alan's funeral when Marlon gave a eulogy.

In 2017, a writer from Inside Soap commented on how they believed that Tricia was still the "true love" of Marlon.

== Tom Shepherd ==
Tom Shepherd
- Emmerdale character
- Portrayed by: Steve Evets
- Duration: 1998–1999
- First appearance: 17 September 1998
- Last appearance: 19 January 1999
- Introduced by: Mervyn Watson
In-universe information
- Occupation: Security Guard

Tom Shepherd, portrayed by Steve Evets, is a security guard who witnessed Kim Tate (Claire King) and her husband, Steve Marchant (Paul Opacic) steal Orsino the horse. He appeared in three episodes overall. He also saw Kathy Glover (Malandra Burrows) being mowed down by Kim and Steve during the robbery. He returned in January 1999 to testify in court against Kim and Steve.

== Barbara Strickland ==
Barbara Strickland
- Emmerdale character
- Portrayed by: Alex Hall
- Duration: 1998–2001
- First appearance: 4 November 1998
- Last appearance: 11 September 2001
- Introduced by: Mervyn Watson (1997); Kieran Roberts (1999); Steve Frost (2001)
In-universe information
- Occupation: Headmistress

Barbara Strickland (also credited as Miss Strickland or Jean Strickland) was the headmistress of Hotten Comprehensive School. She appeared sporadically between 1998 and 2001, when she is killed in a hit-and-run accident on 10 September 2001. The occupants of the car include some of her pupils: Katie Addyman (Sammy Winward), Eve Birch (Raine Davison), Marc (Anthony Lewis) and Ollie Reynolds (Vicky Binns), Andy (Kelvin Fletcher) and Robert Sugden (Karl Davies) and Donna Windsor (Verity Rushworth). The driver, Marc Reynolds, is later sentenced to twelve months in prison for causing death by dangerous driving.

Note: Although usually referred to by her formal title, the character was addressed by the first name Jean in some early appearances. However, when the character was killed off, she was referred to as Barbara during the police investigation and in her funeral service.

== Stella Jones ==
Stella Jones
- Emmerdale character
- Portrayed by: Stephanie Schonfield
- Duration: 1998–1999
- First appearance: 16 December 1998
- Last appearance: 18 August 1999
- Introduced by: Mervyn Watson
In-universe information
- Occupation: Hairdresser

Stella Jones, played by Stephanie Schonfield, made her first screen appearance in December 1998. Schonfield stated that she was thrilled to land the role of Stella and said the cast were very welcoming towards her. Stella made a mysterious arrival in the village of Emmerdale. She purchased Home Farm and residents believed she was a wealthy widow. However, Bernice Blackstock (Samantha Giles) realised Stella reminded her of her old hairdresser from Leeds and after "one glass of champagne too many", Stella revealed that she was a hairdresser who had won the National Lottery. Of why Stella kept her past a secret, Schonfield said "She came to Emmerdale to be somewhere where nobody would know her. Previous experiences have taught her people can get a bit funny about her being a Lottery winner and treat her differently as a result. She's really keen to make sure that doesn't happen this time."

In July 1999, Steven Murphy of Inside Soap reported Schonfield would depart Emmerdale the following month. He said Stella would leave in "a blaze of glory." Of her exit, Schonfield said "I've had a ball. Stella is having an exciting departure." Stella's departure came after she became sick of the residents of Emmerdale only being interested in her money. Guilt-ridden after an affair with Bernice's fiance Gavin (Robert Beck), Stella flees the village leaving a video message attacking those who tried to benefit from her wealth, also giving Bernice - the only person who refused to ask her for money - the deposit she needs to buy The Woolpack.

During a feature on the "wild women" of Emmerdale, a writer for the Daily Mirror said Stella "went behind the back of "best mate" Bernice by enjoying steamy romps with Gavin in a Jacuzzi, in the bushes and in her four-poster bed. Stella's charms were much in demand in the village, thanks mainly to her Lottery win. The hairdresser who tried to reinvent herself as the lady of the manor fended off the attentions of money-grabbing Eric Pollard and the more honourable intentions of Alan Turner. She has just fled the Dales giving Bernice a parting gift of the deposit to buy the pub. It's enough to make your hair curl."

== Belle Dingle ==
Belle Dingle, initially played by Emily Mather, made her debut screen appearance on 25 December 1998. Belle is the daughter of Lisa (Jane Cox) and Zak Dingle (Steve Halliwell). A writer for What's on TV described Belle as a "child genius" and said she "uses her intelligence to think up Dingle-style scams!" In 2005, Eden Taylor-Draper took over the role of Belle from Mather.
