= List of soap opera villains =

A villain is an "evil" character in a story, whether a historical narrative or, especially, a work of fiction. In soap operas, the villain, sometimes called a "bad guy", is an antagonist, tending to have a negative effect on other characters. A female villain is sometimes called a villainess or "bad girl". Random House Unabridged Dictionary defines villain as "a cruelly malicious person who is involved in or devoted to wickedness or crime; scoundrel; or a character in a play, novel, or the like, who constitutes an important evil agency in the plot". An early use of the term soap opera villain was in 1942.

Tom Conroy from Media Life Magazine noted that "On soap operas, sometimes a perfectly nice regular character will suddenly turn into a villain. Viewers are rarely alerted to the change beforehand." Shelley Fralic of the Winnipeg Free Press described the "first-class villain" of soap as: "Ruthless magnate. Serial groom. Charming rogue. Unrepentant schemer. Demanding paterfamilias. Defier of death. Tough, impatient, decisive, magnetic and infuriating. The blackest of blackguards." A writer for Inside Soap magazine warned that "soap psychos" are often overly keen on their partners, keep them separated from their families, have strange things hidden in secret rooms, will attempt to kill their partner's ex-partner, and are fond of fire or high places and named a number of characters from EastEnders, Emmerdale and Coronation Street who have behaved in such ways. Debra Hale, writing about the fate of villains for the Associated Press, said that "Sometimes, a villain becomes so evil he's beyond redemption and must be killed or imprisoned", but noted that "some villains are just too delectable to kill." The following lists soap opera characters who have been described as villainous, evil, bad guys or baddies.

== All My Children ==
- Les Baxter
- Vanessa Bennett
- Michael Cambias
- Adam Chandler Sr.
- Palmer Cortlandt
- Sean Cudahy
- Richard Fields
- Ray Gardner
- Rob Gardner
- Janet Green
- David Hayward
- Eric Kane
- Erica Kane
- Jonathan Lavery
- Greg Madden
- Greenlee Smythe
- Billy Clyde Tuggle
- Garrett Williams

== Another Life ==
- Dan Myers
- Ron Washington

== Another World ==
- Cecile DePoulignac
- Grant Harrison
- Donna Love
- Jake McKinnon
- Iris Wheeler

== The Archers ==
- Brian Aldridge
- Sam Batton
- Matt Crawford
- Clive Horrobin
- Simon Pemberton
- Rob Titchener
- Wayne Tucson
- Hazel Woolley

== As the World Turns ==
- John Dixon
- Lisa Grimaldi
- Craig Montgomery
- Barbara Ryan
- James Stenbeck
- Susan Stewart
- Carly Tenney
- Marshall Travers

== The Bold and the Beautiful ==
- Sheila Carter
- Morgan DeWitt
- Quinn Fuller
- Jesse Graves
- Amber Moore
- Tawny Moore
- Luna Nozawa
- Deacon Sharpe
- Bill Spencer, Jr.
- Prince Omar Rashid

== Brookside ==
- Dave Burns
- Josh Carter
- Imelda Clough
- Jimmy Corkhill
- Lindsey Corkhill
- Jeff Evans
- Callum Finnegan
- Terry Gibson
- Joey Godden
- Barry Grant
- Simon Howe
- Trevor Jordache
- Tommy McArdle
- Jack Michaelson
- Robbie Moffat
- Dan Morrisey
- Christy Murray
- Tim O'Leary
- Leanne Powell
- Emily Shadwick
- Sizzler
- Vinny

== Casualty ==
- Jamie Cleveland
- Ciaran Coulson
- Scott Ellison
- Tina Mollet
- Patrick Onley
- Russell Whitelaw

== The Colbys ==
- Sable Colby
- Zachary Powers

== Coronation Street ==
- Gary Adams
- Jude Appleton
- Lewis Archer
- Owen Armstrong
- Vinny Ashford
- Danny Baldwin
- Mike Baldwin
- Frank Bardsley
- Amy Barlow
- Ken Barlow
- Peter Barlow
- Simon Barlow
- Tracy Barlow
- Cilla Battersby-Brown
- Sharon Bentley
- Reece Bolton
- Christina Boyd
- Alan Bradley
- Jenny Bradley
- Don Brennan
- Corey Brent
- Stefan Brent
- Teresa Bryant
- Casey Carswell
- Joe Carter
- Lydia Chambers
- Ben Chancellor
- Mick Chaney
- Will Chatterton
- Jimmy Clayton
- Kayla Clifton
- Neil Clifton
- Rich Collis
- Carla Connor
- Maria Connor
- Aiden Critchley
- Ray Crosby
- Rowan Cunliffe
- Nathan Curtis
- Ollie Deacon
- Joel Deering
- Hope Dobbs
- Jimmy Dockerson
- Joe Donnelli
- Rob Donovan
- Maggie Driscoll
- Terry Duckworth
- Kieron Edgerton
- Hashim Elamin
- Fred Elliott
- Scott Emberton
- Dom Everett
- Dave Fairchild
- Terry Fensley
- Carmel Finnan
- Denny Foreman
- Frank Foster
- Harvey Gaskell
- Hannah Gilmore
- Tony Gordon
- Todd Grimshaw
- Imran Habeeb
- Caz Hammond
- Damon Hay
- Jacob Hay
- Rachel Healy
- Noah Hedley
- Clayton Hibbs
- Macca Hibbs
- Richard Hillman
- Kel Hinchley
- DC Hooch
- Tyler Jeffries
- Dan Jones
- Greg Kelly
- Lauren
- Jon Lindsay
- Callum Logan
- Mel Maguire
- Anne Malone
- Marcia
- Becky McDonald
- Jim McDonald
- Karen McDonald
- Joe McIntyre
- Geoff Metcalfe
- Lou Michaelis
- Mick Michaelis
- Charles Moore
- Fiona Morley
- Karl Munro
- Blake Myers
- Laura Neelan
- Rick Neelan
- Henry Newton
- Donna Parker
- Richie Parkinson
- Pat Phelan
- Grace Piper
- Rosemary Piper
- David Platt
- Kylie Platt
- Cassie Plummer
- Evelyn Plummer
- Tanya Pooley
- Jez Quigley
- Logan Radcliffe
- Mason Radcliffe
- Matty Radcliffe
- Duncan Radfield
- Jodie Ramsey
- Stephen Reid
- Griff Reynolds
- Mal Roper
- Jade Rowan
- Justin Rutherford
- Aaron Sandford
- Eric Sandford
- Gina Seddon
- Maya Sharma
- Theo Silverton
- Phil Simmonds
- Robbie Sloan
- Kirsty Soames
- Lillian Spencer
- John Stape
- Tony Stewart
- Julia Stone
- Charlie Stubbs
- Becky Swain
- Alex Swinton
- Linda Sykes
- Ryan Sykes
- Henry Thorne
- Nick Tilsley
- Ronan Truman
- Josh Tucker
- Dean Turnbull
- Megan Walsh
- Carl Webster
- Debbie Webster
- Rosie Webster
- Ross Wilkes
- Gary Windass
- Bridget Woodrow

== Crossroads ==
- Ethan Black
- Jake Booth
- Adam Chance
- Brian Noakes
- Angel Samson

== Dallas ==
- J. R. Ewing

== Days of Our Lives ==
- Lawrence Alamain
- Vivian Alamain
- Peter Blake
- Sami Brady
- Fiona Cook
- Anjelica Deveraux
- Jack Deveraux
- Andre DiMera
- EJ DiMera
- Kristen DiMera
- Stefan DiMera
- Stefano DiMera
- Eve Donovan
- Theresa Donovan
- Nick Fallon
- Evan Frears
- Cat Greene
- Megan Hathaway
- Maxwell Jarvis
- Aiden Jennings
- Deimos Kiriakis
- Victor Kiriakis
- Xander Kiriakis
- Alex North
- Alex Marshall
- Konstantin Meleounis
- Orpheus
- Sloan Petersen
- Kate Roberts
- Jan Spears
- Leo Stark
- Ava Vitali
- Connie Viniski
- Nicole Walker
- Ben Weston
- Clyde Weston
- Doug Williams III

== Desperate Housewives ==
- Matthew Applewhite
- Carolyn Bigsby
- Edie Britt
- Jane Carlson
- Mona Clarke
- Rick Coletti
- Wayne Davis
- Alma Hodge
- Gloria Hodge
- Orson Hodge
- Martha Huber
- Victor Lang
- Patrick Logan
- Eddie Orlofsky
- Alejandro Perez
- Kayla Scavo
- Felicia Tilman
- Chuck Vance
- Dave Williams
- George Williams
- Paul Young
- Zach Young
- Donny

== Doctors ==
- Marina Bonnaire
- Charlie Bradfield
- Princess Buchanan
- Zara Carmichael
- Ian Carter
- Franc Christophe
- Cherry Clay
- Layla Darwish
- Rhiannon Davis
- Graham Elton
- Harry Fisher
- Ria Ford
- Daniel Granger
- Jack Harcourt
- Anthony Harker
- Gus Harper
- Alex Haverley
- Lesley Hammond
- Leo Jackson
- Sissy Juggins
- Harrison Kellor
- Ocean Kennedy
- Davey Lowe
- Kate McGuire
- Liam McGuire
- Debbie McQueen
- Andrei Mitkov
- Scott Nielson
- Susan Oakley
- Chloe Pearce
- Lauren Porter
- Steve Rawlings
- Gareth Regan
- Eddie Slade
- Liam Slade
- Tom
- Tyrrel
- Trevor Waterhouse

== Dynasty ==
- Adam Carrington
- Alexis Colby
- Sable Colby
- Dominique Deveraux

== E Street ==
- Mr Bad (Stephen Richardson)
- Sonny Bennett

== EastEnders ==
- Ahmet
- Johnny Allen
- Ruby Allen
- Gray Atkins
- Simon Atmore
- Tom Bailey
- Keegan Baker
- Clare Bates
- Terry Bates
- Bobby Beale
- Cindy Beale
- Ian Beale
- Lucy Beale
- Steven Beale
- Bijan
- Oz Bolat
- Abi Branning
- Derek Branning
- Jack Branning
- Joey Branning
- Max Branning
- Fi Browning
- Hugo Browning
- Luke Browning
- Bruno
- Janine Butcher
- Lewis Butler
- Frankie Byrne
- Terry Cant
- Lee Carter
- Stan Carter
- Pastor Clayton
- Richard Cole
- Reiss Colwell
- Jimmy Coogan
- Charlie Cotton
- Dotty Cotton
- Nick Cotton
- Tom "Rocky" Cotton
- Stella Crawford
- Neil Crossley
- Jack Dalton
- Alexandra D'Costa
- Greg Dolan
- Madison Drake
- Juliette Dubois
- Tom Eden
- Andy Flynn
- Graham Foster
- Sonia Fowler
- Rob Grayson
- Ranveer Gulati
- Ravi Gulati
- Danny Hardcastle
- Mo Harris
- Ned Hawkins
- Theo Hawthorne
- Jonno Highway
- Stuart Highway
- Claudette Hubbard
- Vincent Hubbard
- Angel Hudson
- Andy Hunter
- Craig Ingram
- Matthew Jackson
- Sam James
- Lucas Johnson
- Alfie Kane
- Samantha Keeble
- Ray Kelly
- Yusef Khan
- Leo King
- Tony King
- Eddie Knight
- Tariq Larousi
- Katy Lewis
- Donna Ludlow
- Joe Macer
- Tosh Mackintosh
- Aidan Maguire
- Joel Marshall
- Ross Marshall
- Syed Masood
- Midge
- Margaret Midhurst
- Archie Mitchell
- Ben Mitchell
- Billy Mitchell
- Danny Mitchell
- Eric Mitchell
- Glenda Mitchell
- Grant Mitchell
- Louise Mitchell
- Nicola Mitchell
- Phil Mitchell
- Ronnie Mitchell
- Roxy Mitchell
- Sam Mitchell
- Aaron Monroe
- Alfie Moon
- Michael Moon
- Trevor Morgan
- Ellie Nixon
- Tobias "Okie" Okyere
- Mehmet Osman
- Barbara Owen
- Hunter Owen
- Mel Owen
- Steve Owen
- George Palmer
- Nish Panesar
- Suki Panesar
- Danny Pennant
- Fraser Philips
- Bea Pollard
- Annie Pritchard
- Dennis Rickman
- Dennis Rickman Jnr
- Willy Roper
- Mandy Salter
- Stas Saunders
- Shiv
- Lydia Simmonds
- Bev Slater
- Harry Slater
- Hayley Slater
- Sean Slater
- Babe Smith
- Nikki Spraggan
- Evie Steele
- Lorraine Stevens
- Dan Sullivan
- Gavin Sullivan
- Bernadette Taylor
- Keanu Taylor
- DI Steve Thompson
- Michaela Turnbull
- Anthony Trueman
- Owen Turner
- Angie Watts
- Chrissie Watts
- Den Watts
- Adam White
- Carl White
- Nora White
- David Wicks
- Dean Wicks
- James Willmott-Brown
- May Wright
- Dan Zappieri

== The Edge of Night ==
- Raven Alexander Whitney

== Eldorado ==
- Marcus Tandy

== Emmerdale ==
- Paul Ashdale
- Victor Anderson
- DI Mark Bails
- Emma Barton
- Ross Barton
- Derek Benrose
- Mackenzie Boyd
- Leanna Cavanagh
- Al Chapman
- Graham Clark
- Connor
- Josh Cope
- Connor Cooper
- Celia Daniels
- Reg Dawson
- Dean
- Belle Dingle
- Cain Dingle
- Charity Dingle
- Debbie Dingle
- Eli Dingle
- Noah Dingle
- Shane Doyle
- Sandra Flaherty
- Adam Forsythe
- Graham Foster
- Anthony Fox
- Ruby Fox-Miligan
- Jade Garrick
- Max Garrick
- Jordan Greenlow
- Liam Hammond
- Colin Hamston
- Danny Harrington
- Pierce Harris
- Faye Helders
- Nick Henshall
- Cathy Hope
- Eddie Hope
- Billy Hopwood
- Jason
- Eve Jenson
- Meena Jutla
- Carl King
- Matthew King
- Nicola King
- Rosemary King
- Sadie King
- Thomas King
- Tom King
- Rakesh Kotecha
- Robbie Lawson
- Gordon Livesy
- Declan Macey
- Megan Macey
- DI Mark Malone
- Syd McFarlane
- Simon McManus
- Caleb Miligan
- Alex Moore
- Harry Mowlam
- Ray Mullan
- Cameron Murray
- Gary North
- Lord Alex Oakwell
- Eric Pollard
- Lee Posner
- Russell Posner
- Hari Prasad
- Craig Reed
- Sean Reynolds
- Denis Rigg
- Tracy Shankley
- Amit Sharma
- Jai Sharma
- Grayson Sinclair
- Amelia Spencer
- Daz Spencer
- Sally Spode
- Maya Stepney
- Jo Stiles
- Steph Stokes
- Andy Sugden
- John Sugden
- Robert Sugden
- Andrea Tate
- Chris Tate
- Jamie Tate
- Joe Tate
- Kim Tate
- Zoe Tate
- Will Taylor
- Terry
- Arthur Thomas
- Gabby Thomas
- Tara Thornfield
- Kev Townsend
- Caitlin Todd
- Alan Turner
- Terence Turner
- Ray Walters
- Derek Warner
- Mike Wentworth
- Chrissie White
- Lachlan White
- Lawrence White
- Kelly Windsor
- Scott Windsor
- DS Jason Wise
- Kerry Wyatt
- Nathan Wylde

== Fair City ==
- Billy Meehan

== Falcon Crest ==
- Angela Channing
- Erin Jones
- Joel McCarthy

== Family Affairs ==
- Pete Callan
- Chrissy Costello
- Graham Harker
- Julie-Ann Jones
- Dave Matthews
- George Shackleford
- Mike Shaw
- Olly Taylor
- Claire Toomey
- Trish Wallace

== General Hospital ==
- Luis Alcazar
- Peter August
- Derek Barrington
- Nelle Benson
- Jack Brennan
- Drew Cain
- Helena Cassadine
- Mikkos Cassadine
- Ryan Chamberlain
- Sonny Corinthos
- Cesar Faison
- Jerry Jacks
- Ava Jerome
- Ric Lansing
- Liesl Obrecht
- Lisa Niles
- Esme Prince
- Faith Rosco
- Cyrus Renault
- Sidwell
- Willow Tait
- Heather Webber
- Anthony Zacchara
- Claudia Zacchara

== Guiding Light ==
- Annie Dutton
- Brent Lawrence
- Dinah Marler
- Susan Piper
- Bradley Raines
- Daniel St. John
- Carmen Santos
- Alan Spaulding
- Roger Thorpe
- Edmund Winslow

== High Road ==
- Jim Hunter
- Davie Sneddon

== Holby City ==
- Tom Campbell-Gore
- Cameron Dunn
- John Gaskell
- Vanessa Lytton
- Isaac Mayfield
- Jac Naylor
- Guy Self
- Jeni Sinclair
- Kelly Yorke

== Hollyoaks ==
- Scott Anderson
- DS Gavin Armstrong
- Dermot Ashton
- DI Alistair Banks
- Jonny Baxter
- Gaz Bennett
- Fraser Black
- Grace Black
- Jeremy Blake
- Martha Blake
- Nico Blake
- Patrick Blake
- Sienna Blake
- Silas Blissett
- Wendy Blissett
- Big Bob
- Olivia Bradshaw
- Brendan Brady
- Victor Brothers
- Doctor Browning
- Pete Buchanan
- Laura Burns
- Justin Burton
- Kim Butterfield
- Lindsey Butterfield
- Cameron Campbell
- Granny Campbell
- Joanne Cardsley
- Dave Chen-Williams
- Derek Clough
- Fergus Collins
- Mick Cornus
- Carl Costello
- Seth Costello
- Norma Crow
- Holly Cunningham
- Steph Cunningham
- Ashley Davidson
- Jake Dean
- Clare Devine
- Joel Dexter
- Glenn Donovan
- Liam Donovan
- Scott Drinkwell
- Milo Entwistle
- Eva Falco
- Celeste Faroe
- Toby Faroe
- Abe Fielding
- Arlo Fielding
- Eric Foster
- Warren Fox
- Rex Gallagher
- Mark Gibbs
- Will Hackett
- Dilly Harcourt
- Deena Hardman
- Maya Harkwell
- Lydia Hart
- Declan Hawthorne
- Rob Hawthorne
- Ste Hay
- Terry Hay
- Joseph Holmes
- Andy Holt
- Danny Houston
- Edward Hutchinson
- Verity Hutchinson
- Gemma Johnson
- Theo Jones
- Sean Kennedy
- George Kiss
- Ryan Knight
- Dr. Ramsey Ley
- Lisa Loveday
- Imran Maalik
- Sami Maalik
- Stephen MacGregor
- Stephen Mackintosh
- Abigail Matthews
- Ray McCormick
- Breda McQueen
- John Paul McQueen
- Mercedes McQueen
- Toby Mills
- Maddie Morrison
- James Nightingale
- Mac Nightingale
- Marnie Nightingale
- Nathan Nightingale
- Finn O'Connor
- Sinead O'Connor
- Darren Osborne
- JJ Osborne
- Sam Owen
- Kate Patrick
- Jordan Price
- Donna-Marie Quinn
- Niall Rafferty
- Alex Ramsdan
- Cormac Ranger
- Summer Ranger
- Dennis Richardson
- Ella Richardson
- Lewis Richardson
- Freddie Roscoe
- Robbie Roscoe
- Rayne Royce
- Trevor Royle
- Trudy Ryan
- Kyle Ryder
- Will Savage
- Ali Shahzad
- Laurie Shelby
- Carter Shepherd
- Timmy Simons
- Buster Smith
- Connor "Sully" Sullivan
- Stuart Sumner
- Shane Sweeney
- Sean Tate
- Shane
- Michael St John Thomas
- Calvin Valentine
- Sonny Valentine
- Walker
- Felix Westwood
- Darcy Wilde
- Ethan Williams
- Cher Winters

== Home and Away ==
- Jonah Abraham
- Hugo Austin
- Kieran Baldivis
- Andy Barrett
- Morag Bellingham
- Saul Bennett
- Rick Booth
- Danny Braxton
- Heath Braxton
- Kyle Braxton
- Joanne Brennan
- Jacob Cameron
- Dylan Carter
- Chase
- Johnny Cooper
- Robbo Cruze
- Margot Dafoe
- Donna De Bono
- Holden Dwyer
- Boyd Easton
- Ebony Easton
- Hazel Easton
- Donald Fisher
- Tabitha Ford
- Heather Frazer
- Courtney Freeman
- David Gardiner
- Elliot Gillen
- Penn Graham
- Nelson Gregory
- Grigg
- Trevor Gunson
- John Hall
- Hammer
- Beau Hammond
- Carl Hayes
- Lewis Hayes
- Corey Henderson
- Eve Jacobsen
- Aden Jefferies
- Mick Jennings
- Charlotte King
- Hunter King
- Peter King
- Bronte Langford
- Ryan Lee
- Sarah Lewis
- Ethan MacGuire
- Detective Madden
- Kerrie Matheson
- Douglas Maynard
- Susie McAllister
- Mickey
- Jade Montgomery
- Matthew Montgomery
- Roscoe Mulhern
- Nerida Mullins
- Mumma Rose
- Natalie Nash
- Ross Nixon
- Dennis Novak
- Dean O'Mara
- Tug O'Neale
- Tommy O'Reilly
- John Palmer
- Trey Palmer
- Paul
- Kane Phillips
- Jake Pirovic
- Dimitri Poulos
- Trystan Powell
- Todd Reinhardt
- Revhead
- Gage Reynolds
- Irene Roberts
- Angie Russell
- Josie Russell
- Claudia Salini
- Adam Sharpe
- Jamie Sharpe
- Anne Sherman
- Simmo
- Al Simpson
- Tank Snelgrove
- Spike
- Roo Stewart
- Sully
- Sophie Taylor
- Rory Templeton
- Colby Thorne
- Amanda Vale
- Kelli Vale
- Felix Walters
- Craig Wendell
- Josh West
- Wes
- Tex Wheeler
- Sidney Wickham
- Jack Wilson
- William Zannis

== Knots Landing ==
- Jill Bennett
- Abby Cunningham
- Joshua Rush
- Greg Sumner
- Danny Waleska

== Loving ==
- Garth Slater

== Neighbours ==
- Zenin Alexio
- Mick Allsop
- Britney Barnes
- Gareth Bateman
- Olivia Bell
- David Bishop
- Gavin Bowman
- Scarlett Brady
- Rocco Cammeniti
- Kyle Canning
- Mary Casey
- Gus Cleary
- Garland Cole
- Tim Collins
- Chris Cousens
- Louis Curtain
- Dennis Dimato
- Glen Donnelly
- Ruby Dwyer
- Wade Fernsby
- Mannix Foster
- Cassandra Freedman
- Cassius Grady
- Fiona Hartman
- Reuben Hausman
- Jacka Hills
- Izzy Hoyland
- Forrest Jones
- Kane Jones
- Finn Kelly
- Michelle Kim
- Katya Kinski
- Marty Kranic
- Rhys Lawson
- Melissa Lohan
- Len Mangel
- Nell Mangel
- Diana Marshall
- Michael Martin
- Krystal McCoy
- Emma McIver
- Veronica McLain
- Sebastian Metcalfe
- Stephen Montague
- Troy Miller
- Chelsea Murphy
- Sue Parker
- Nick Petrides
- Ari Philcox
- Julie Quill
- Shane Ramsay
- Gemma Reeves
- Ted Regan
- Ivan Renshaw
- Elle Robinson
- Paul Robinson
- Robert Robinson
- Hamish Roche
- Heath Royce
- Heather Schilling
- Stephanie Scully
- Eden Shaw
- Yasmine Shields
- Harry Sinclair
- Robbo Slade
- Corey Smythe-Jones
- Adrian Snyder
- Andrea Somers
- Charlotte Stone
- Nicolette Stone
- Dave Summers
- Guy Sykes
- Leo Tanaka
- Mason Turner
- Darcy Tyler
- Prue Wallace
- Claudia Watkins
- Sindi Watts
- Nicola West
- Slade Westall
- Natasha Williams

== One Life to Live ==
- Ursula Blackwell
- Ted Clayton
- Margaret Cochran
- Melinda Cramer
- Marco Dane
- R. J. Gannon
- Michael Grande
- Carlo Hesser
- Mitch Laurence
- Dorian Lord
- Victor Lord
- Jack Manning
- Todd Manning
- Alex Olanov
- Allison Perkins
- Spencer Truman
- Brad Vernon
- David Vickers

== Pacific Drive ==
- Trey Devlin

== Passions ==
- Norma Bates
- Vincent Clarkson
- Alistair Crane
- Beth Wallace

== Prisoner ==
- Joan Ferguson

== Red Rock ==
- Patricia Hennesy
- Brian McGonigle

== The Restless Years ==
- Rita Merrick

== Santa Barbara ==
- Gina Blake Lockridge
- Keith Timmons

== Search for Tomorrow ==
- Estelle Kendall

== Shortland Street ==
- Regan Ames
- Katherine Blake
- Mackenzie Choat
- Paul Churchill
- Aleesha Cook
- Layla Cornwall
- Carla Crozier
- Greg Feeney
- Annette Freeman
- Brooke Freeman
- Josh Gallagher
- Bree Hamilton
- Joey Henderson
- Oscar Henry
- Jack Hewitt
- Samara Hindmarsh
- Fergus Kearney
- Darryl Neilson
- Hayley O'Neill
- Ethan Pierce
- Dylan Reinhart
- Penny Rourke
- Ian Seymour
- Zac Smith
- Robyn Stokes
- Dominic Thompson

== Sunset Beach ==
- Eddie Connors
- Annie Douglas Richards
- Gregory Richards

== Texas ==
- Clipper Blake

== The Young and the Restless ==
- Sheila Carter
- Matt Clark
- Gary Dawson
- Kevin Fisher
- Jill Abbott
- Jordan Howard
- JT Hellstrom
- Cameron Kirsten
- David Kimble
- Chloe Mitchell
- Adam Newman
- Victor Newman
- Gina Roma
- Phyllis Summers
- Ian Ward
- Patty Williams
