= Steve Marchant =

- Emmerdale character
- Portrayed by: Paul Opacic
- Duration: 1996–1999, 2026–present
- First appearance: 26 March 1996
- Introduced by: Mervyn Watson
In-universe information
- Other names: Trevor Marchant
- Occupation: Businessman
- Adoptive father: John Kenyon (foster)
- Adoptive mother: Janie Kenyon (foster)
- Wife: Kim Tate (1998–1999)
- Daughters: Thea Ramsden
- Stepsons: Jamie Tate (1998–1999)

Steve Marchant is a fictional character from the British television soap opera Emmerdale, portrayed by Paul Opacic. He made his first appearance on 26 March 1996. Opacic originally auditioned for the role of Sean Rossi, before he was cast as Steve for an initial six-episode stint, and was introduced as a former university friend of Rachel Hughes (Glenda McKay). Series producer Kieran Roberts decided to write the character out in 1998, and Opacic made his final appearance on 20 January 1999. Later that year, Steve was named one of "the 30 greatest Emmerdale residents" by Inside Soap. In November 2026, it was announced that Opacic had reprised the role and the character's return aired on 20 November.

== Casting ==
Opacic originally auditioned for the role of chef Sean Rossi, but he proved perfect for the role of "shady dealer" Steve instead. He was initially signed for six episodes, and the announcement of his casting came in February 1996.

== Development ==
The Daily Mirror's Sarah Hey reported that Opacic's character was an "entrepreneur" and a former friend of established regular Rachel Hughes (Glenda McKay). Hey said: "The pair went to university together and it isn't long before Chris feels jealous." Opacic explained that Steve moves to the village because he has become fed up with city life, but it is no coincidence that he comes to Emmerdale where Rachel is living. He continued: "He's been there and done that, but most of the people he met were very shallow. It led him to think, 'Where's that girl I fell in love with all those years ago?' And he comes back to reclaim her." Opacic thought Steve liked Rachel because she was "genuine", easy to talk to and trust. He said she was the kind of person you fall in love with, rather than lust after. Opacic believed his character was "disappointed" when he learned that Rachel was married, but this showed off his determined side as he pursued her, hoping she would feel the same way. Opacic found that Steve had something in common with Rachel's husband Chris Tate (Peter Amory); "He will manipulate other people to get what he wants. If their useful time has expired it's bye-bye." Steve plots to get rid of his girlfriend Faye Clarke (Helena Calvert), as he goes after Rachel, as he feels that she has outlived her usefulness. Opacic said Steve's ruthlessness comes out as he sets Faye up with a job in Leeds, but makes her think she has been head-hunted. He also said that it shows what kind of person he could be, as you have to be hard to succeed in his career.

In September 1998, Matthew Wright of the Daily Mirror reported Opacic and two other cast members had been written out by new series producer Kieran Roberts. Of his departure, Opacic said "I will miss being on Emmerdale, but it's time to move on and do other things. The door has been left open for me to return once Steve gets out, though. It would be great to be a recurring character."

In November 2026, it was announced that Opacic would reprise the role. Speaking about his return, he said: "Things were left rather bitter between Kim and Steve, so he's very surprised when a solicitor contacts him out of the blue. He guesses something is afoot when Kim starts brandishing notes to keep him away." Steve's return was first teased when Kim revealed to Thea Ramsden (Chelsea Edge) that he was her father. The character's return scenes aired at the end of the episode broadcast on 20 November 2026.

== Storylines ==
Shortly after arriving in the village, it emerges that Steve is an old university friend of local resident Rachel Hughes. Rachel's estranged husband, Chris Tate is jealous of their bond, and after Rachel's marriage to Chris ends, Steve and Rachel date. Soon afterward, Steve befriends Chris' sister Zoe Tate (Leah Bracknell) and starts working on a business association with Chris and Zoe's father Frank Tate (Norman Bowler). His attempts to establish the Tate assets are obstructed over Rachel and her son Joseph – up to the point where Steve ends his relationship with Rachel and briefly dates her neighbour Charlie Cairns (Sarah Graham).

Frank dies of a heart attack when his estranged former wife Kim Tate (Claire King) returns, though it was alleged that she was dead; Frank was implicated in her "death." Kim finds solace with Steve after the funeral, and they form a romantic bond. They become engaged, but Steve is hesitant to marry when Kim proceeds to establish a business partnership with Lord Alex Oakwell (Rupam Maxwell). On the night of Kim and Steve's engagement party, Alex ends up causing the death of Zoe's best-friend Linda Fowler (Tonicha Jeronimo). The follow-up to Linda's death sparks a feud between her husband Biff Fowler (Stuart Wade) and father Ned Glover (Johnny Leeze), as well as Alex's trophy-wife Tara Cockburn (Anna Brecon). Despite this, Steve continues to support Kim and later comforts her when she is mysteriously blackmailed. On Christmas Day, Kim's son James Tate is kidnapped. Steve manages to sort out her troubles by confronting her blackmailer. James is soon rescued and the police arrest his kidnapper, who turns out to be Linda's grieving mother Jan Glover (Roberta Kerr).

Eventually, Steve and Kim get married. Shortly afterward, the pair are shocked to learn that their business partner is on the verge of financial bankruptcy, which consequently puts their businesses and ownership of Frank's old property, Home Farm Estates, in jeopardy. Desperate to solve their financial troubles, Steve plans to steal a horse from one of Kim's business rivals. He is initially successful until Steve strikes Kathy Bates (Malandra Burrows) with his car. Steve leaves Kathy to die, but she is found and hospitalised. Steve attempts to kill her by smothering her with a pillow. However, after learning about what Steve did to Kathy, Kim rushes to the hospital and stops him at the last second. Kim later urges her husband to leave the country until the investigation into both the horse theft and its contribution to Kathy's hit and run incident blows over. Steve agrees and rushes to the airport, but ends up getting arrested just before he can board the plane. He is then taken to the police station, where he is charged with theft and attempted murder. Kim fabricates a story where she has ended their marriage because of the murder attempt on Kathy and her wariness of his behaviour in reaction to their impending divorce. Upon learning of his wife's statement, Steve realises that Kim is planning to frame him for their conspiracy plan and vows to bring her down. While Kim is able to gain support from both Kathy and Zoe over the incident, Chris agrees to help Steve bring Kim down.

Before the trial, Steve pleads guilty to horse theft and obtaining money by deception – to which Kim pleads not guilty for both offenses – while also pleading not guilty for attempted murder regarding Kathy's hit and run incident. The trial begins badly for Steve after Kim manages to gain support for her theory of the story. Chris' efforts to expose her role in Frank's death are dismissed. Kathy gradually figures out Kim's involvement behind Steve's crime and ends up changing her statement. Following Kathy's testimony, Steve believes that Kim will be the one going to prison while he ends up getting acquitted for their illegitimate activities. On the night before the verdict, however, Kim ends up fleeing the village with James in a helicopter. Steve learns about Kim's escape and the verdict ends up being announced without her presence. Although Kim is found guilty of theft and obtaining money by deception, Steve is found guilty of attempted murder. While she receives 12 months to each charge of theft and obtaining money by deception, with the judge granting Steve's good judgement for his guilty plea and co-operation with the police behind Kim's crimes, Steve ends up being sentenced to 10 years for attempted murder for Kathy's hit and run incident. Outraged that he is going to prison and Kim is not, Steve attempts to escape – only to be tackled by police guards and dragged away from the courtroom.

== Reception ==
Steve was named as one of "The 30 greatest Emmerdale residents" by a writer for Inside Soap. They said "The Emmerdale girls thought this Mulder from The X-Files lookalike was out of this world when he arrived – well, Rachel Hughes did at least! His downfall was getting involved with Kim Tate, who left him facing jail while she jetted off with a fortune." Diana Hollingsworth of Soaplife included Steve in her feature on wide boys and she said "City slicker Steve married wealthy superbitch Kim Tate in the knowledge that he'd lost a fortune on the stock market. Unfortunately for him, Kim also had a secret. She wasn't quite as loaded as he'd hoped..." In 2015, Lewis Panther from the Daily Mirror called the character a "womaniser" and noted that Opacic had a successful stint on Emmerdale.
