= Len Reynolds =

Fictional character from Emmerdale

- Emmerdale character
- Portrayed by: Peter Martin
- Duration: 2001–2007
- First appearance: 21 February 2001
- Last appearance: 17 May 2007
- Introduced by: Kieran Roberts
In-universe information
- Occupation: Retired mechanic
- Wife: Eileen Reynolds (backstory)
- Sons: Sean Reynolds
- Grandsons: Marc Reynolds
- Granddaughters: Ollie Reynolds

Leonard "Len" Reynolds is a fictional character from the British ITV soap opera Emmerdale, played by Peter Martin.

== Development ==
In May 2007, Martin's character Len was killed off because Martin accepted a role in a stage production of Dad's Army. Anna Brecon, Cleveland Campbell, and Anthony Lewis, three of Martin's former co-stars, reprised their roles as Tara Thornfield, Danny Daggert, and Marc Reynolds, respectively, for Len's funeral.

== Storylines ==
Following the death of his wife, Eileen Len arrives in the village to visit their son, Sean. The family welcomes Len's presence as Sean and his wife, Angie, are having marital difficulties, and Len is a mediator. Sean and Angie separate after Angie has an affair with Cain Dingle and Sean later leaves with his new girlfriend, Tara Thornfield. Len stays to help Angie rebuild her life at the request of his granddaughter Ollie (Vicky Binns), and Len keeps a close watch on his grandchildren. Following Angie's death, Len's grandson Marc goes to live with his father, and Ollie stays behind with her boyfriend Danny Daggert, who moves in with them. Ollie leaves for University, leaving Len and Danny depressed.

Len develops feelings for the local pensioner Edna Birch (Shirley Stelfox), but she does not reciprocate. However, he finds love again with flamboyant newcomer Pearl Ladderbanks (Meg Johnson). Enchanted by Pearl's sunny personality, Len invites her to move in with him and Danny. Pearl, however, is hiding a secret. Her son, Frank Bernard Hartbourne (Rob Parry), who she said was a financial advisor, had been paroled after serving a sentence for rape. When Len discovers the truth, he is horrified but realizes what Pearl has been through and agrees to stand by her. Problems escalate when Frank's arrival is announced in the Hotten Courrier, and the villagers become irate, turning their frustrations on Len and Pearl. Only vicar Ashley Thomas (John Middleton) and Edna stand by them. After Frank is savagely beaten by Scott Windsor (Ben Freeman), he moves into a bail hostel in Leeds. Devastated at being treated so cruelly by their neighbours, the couple decides to leave Emmerdale for a few weeks and contemplate moving to Cheshire nearer to Sean and Tara. Len and Pearl eventually return and rebuild their relationship with their neighbours.

Len and Pearl's relationship is tested when Pearl falls into debt after trying to save money to visit her grandson Owen Hartbourne (Oliver Lee) in Hong Kong after he visits. Eric Pollard (Chris Chittell), Pearl's boss, begins blackmailing her even after she has repaid some of the loans and Len angrily punches him. Eric then charges Pearl the early settlement fee and tells her it must be paid, or he will report Len to the police for assault. When Len finds out, he is annoyed that Pearl kept it from him. Their relationship ends and Pearl leaves the village in disgrace. She returns several months later, intent on winning Len back. He tells Pearl he is in love with Edna, although Pearl is uninterested. However, Len and Pearl reunite and plan their wedding after Len proposes.

During this time, Edna confides in Len that she discovered a forged structural report connected to the Kings' River showroom explosion, incriminating the King family's role in the incident. He persuades her to report the evidence to the HSE, but it is insufficient. Len later learns that Tom is blackmailing Edna over the knowledge that her son Peter Birch (Philip Bird), was really her sister Lily Butterfield's (Anne Charleston) child. Len punches Tom, who retaliates, and a brawl breaks out until Tom's youngest son Carl (Tom Lister) arrives. Len swears revenge on Tom for his treatment of Edna and the cover-up of the explosion. Len is further incensed when Tom invites Edna to his wedding to Rosemary Sinclair (Linda Thorson) at home farm. Len visits Tom but leaves. Tom is later killed after being struck over the head and sent through a window.

On the day of the Village's 500th birthday pageant, Len comforts Edna after Pearl fails to include her while supervising activities. He returns to the church with his friend, Sandy Thomas (Freddie Jones). During the celebrations outside, Len dies in his chair of a heart attack. He is discovered by Sandy, who brings him a drink and thinks he is asleep. He tries to rouse him until finally checking Len's pulse, realizing he has died. Sandy, knowing it is too late, tells a shocked Pearl, who is devastated. Jo Stiles (Roxanne Pallett), who had become a close friend of Len's through Danny, begs Donna Windsor-Dingle (Verity Rushworth) to continue trying to resuscitate him, but to no avail. An ambulance arrives to take Len's body away while Pearl contemplates her loss in private, while Sandy comforts Betty Eagleton (Paula Tilbrook) and Edna. As news of Len's death spreads around the village, his body is driven away in an ambulance while Katherine Jenkins sings him out, closing the pageant, unaware of the death that has occurred.
