= Lord Alex Oakwell =

Fictional character from Emmerdale

- Emmerdale character
- Portrayed by: Rupam Maxwell
- Duration: 1997–1998
- First appearance: 9 July 1997
- Last appearance: 10 February 1998
- Introduced by: Kieran Roberts
- Spin-off appearances: Emmerdale: Revenge (1998)
In-universe information
- Occupation: Stud farm owner
- Wife: Tara Cockburn (1997–1998)

Alex, Lord Oakwell is a fictional character from the British ITV soap opera Emmerdale, played by Rupam Maxwell. The actor auditioned for the part of Alex and was told he had won the role on the same day. His casting was announced in June 1997. Maxwell said he was thrilled to get the part, and he hoped his character would have some juicy storylines lined up. Maxwell made his first screen appearance as Alex during the episode broadcast on 9 July 1997.

Alex was a young aristocrat, who inherited Oakwell Hall. A writer for the Daily Mirror branded Alex a womaniser and said he was arrogant and self-centred. Maxwell stated his character would not be the most popular person in Emmerdale. The character was introduced as the fiancé of Tara Cockburn (Anna Brecon), and later embarked on an affair and business partnership with local businesswoman Kim Tate (Claire King). He continued to pursue her even after he married Tara. Alex developed a drug addiction and during Emmerdale's 25th anniversary episode, he caused the death of Linda Fowler (Tonicha Jeronimo).

While out for a drive with Linda, Alex snorted cocaine and tried to molest her. As she fought him off, Alex crashed the car and when he saw Linda was unconscious, he moved her into the driver's seat. Alex made a return to the village in February 1998 during a one-hour episode and he later appeared in the spin-off Emmerdale: Revenge, in which he died after falling from a roof. Mark Oliver of The People referred to Alex as "dashing", while Tony Purnell of the Daily Mirror branded him "the biggest baddie on the box."

== Casting ==
Maxwell told Linda Udall of The People that he was "absolutely thrilled" to get the part of Alex. He explained "Landing a part in Emmerdale is the biggest thing that has happened in my career. It's such a fantastic opportunity for me. I went for an audition on a Thursday morning, I was offered the part in the afternoon and started filming the following Monday. It's been absolutely incredible." Maxwell said he was unsure what was in store for his character, but he hoped it would be juicy. He believed that he was going to enjoy the part and added "I've never played a lover before and I'm looking forward to getting some experience at this particular role." Maxwell made his debut screen appearance as Alex on 9 July 1997.

== Development ==
Maxwell described Alex as "a sexy young aristocrat" and said he did not think he was anything like his character. Udall called Alex a "thrusting young newcomer", while a writer for the Daily Mirror said he was "an arrogant, self-centred womaniser." Of Alex, Maxwell later said "I have to find a positive side to his character but I have to admit it can be pretty hard with a person like Alex. He is weak-willed, arrogant and motivated by self-preservation. He is certainly not going to be the most popular person in Emmerdale."

Alex soon encountered Kim Tate (Claire King) and she initially dismissed him for a stable hand, but when she learnt he was a lord, she changed her attitude towards him. Kim made a play for Alex, seeing him as a wealthy potential investor. King told Helen Childs of Inside Soap that Kim finds Alex's title very attractive, as soon as she learnt he was a lord, he became more fanciable to her. Childs said it was an added bonus that Alex happened to be "handsome toy-boy material as well." Kim tried to charm her way into Alex's affections, but his fiancée Tara Cockburn (Anna Brecon) stood in her way. Describing Kim's reaction to Tara, King said "She doesn't believe Alex genuinely loves Tara either. It's one of those marriages of convenience, where they've known each other since they were six and their daddies expected them to marry. In fact, it's almost like an arranged marriage." Kim tried to put an end to Alex's engagement, by using their business deals over the stud farm. Alex was aware that Kim had money, which he needed as he was almost broke. Kim believed she could be a part of Alex's life, by throwing money at him. Childs explained Kim's partner Steve Marchant (Paul Opacic) could only stand back and watch Kim try to secure a place among the upper classes and added that with Alex on the scene, Steve did not stand a chance. Kim later invested in Alex's stud farm and he continued to show an interest in her even after he married Tara in a lavish ceremony on 21 August 1997. Opacic said Steve did not know Kim and Alex had begun an affair, as he assumed a lord would not be interested in a middle-class woman like Kim.

During the soap's 25th anniversary episode broadcast in late 1997, Alex caused the death of regular character Linda Fowler (Tonicha Jeronimo). While attending Kim's engagement party at Home Farm, Alex was caught snorting cocaine in the bathroom. He later flirted with Linda, after she had a row with Biff Fowler (Stuart Wade), and he offered to take her for a drive in his sports car. Alex was seen snorting cocaine while driving and he tried to molest Linda, who fought him off. The fight caused Alex to crash the car into a ditch and when he discovered Linda was unconscious, he moved her into the driver's seat. The Daily Mirror's Tony Purnell said "The lecherous lord escaped serious injury and fled the scene". Biff then discovered Linda's lifeless body in the car. Alex later returned to the village in a one-hour special broadcast on 10 February 1998. The episode was described as being "dramatic" and "action-packed" by a writer for Inside Soap. The cast and crew were due to film the whole episode shortly before Christmas, but an unexpected snow flurry forced a schedule change and they had to finish filming in January 1998 instead. Alex then appeared in the spin-off Emmerdale: Revenge, which was released on video on 20 November 1998. Linda's brother, Roy (Nicky Evans), tracked him down to London, where he was found to be involved in a drugs gang. While being chased across a roof, Alex slipped and fell to his death.

== Storylines ==
Lord Alex Oakwell and his fiancée, Tara Cockburn (Anna Brecon), form a partnership with local businesswoman Kim Tate (Claire King) at Home Farm Estates. Alex soon begins an affair with Kim, even though she is engaged to Steve Marchant (Paul Opacic). Alex and Tara marry, but Alex continues his affair with Kim, until Steve discovers them and warns Kim that Alex has an ulterior motive. Kim continues to build her partnership with Alex, but she eventually questions his character when she catches him taking cocaine in the midst of her engagement party. During the party, Alex flirts with local vet nurse Linda Fowler (Tonicha Jeronimo) and he offers to take her home, to which Linda agrees. Alex takes more cocaine, and Linda has to fight him off when he attempts to molest her. Alex loses control of his car and crashes into a tree, injuring Linda. He then moves an unconscious Linda to the driver's seat and flees the area, after kissing her goodbye. As a result, Linda is incriminated for causing the car accident and she later dies in hospital.

A few months later, Alex returns to the village and feigns remorse for killing Linda to Tara, who attempts to use this opportunity to get revenge by agreeing to leave the country and start anew with him. However, Alex betrays Tara when he takes her jewellery and leaves without her – leaving Tara heartbroken. Alex takes Linda's father Ned Glover (Johnny Leeze) and her husband Biff Fowler (Stuart Wade) hostage at gunpoint, before kidnapping Steve, Linda's colleague, vet Paddy Kirk (Dominic Brunt) and Ned's friend Zak Dingle (Steve Halliwell). Though he loses control of the siege when Paddy injects one of Alex's henchmen before he can shoot Zak dead, Alex manages to flee the village. Ten months later, Linda's younger brother Roy Glover (Nicky Evans) learns that Alex has resurfaced in London and sets out to avenge Linda's death. Teaming up with Dan Campbell (Richard Dillane), a detective sergeant who worked undercover in Alex's empire to investigate his criminal activities, Roy pursues Alex and they fight on a roof. Alex ends up hanging from the edge of the roof, and pleads for Roy to help him. Roy reluctantly attempts to help Alex to safety, but Alex loses his grip and falls to his death.

== Reception ==
Linda Udall of The People said "Maxwell looks like he could have stepped straight from the pages of a Jilly Cooper sex and saddle saga. In skin-tight jodhpurs, black leather riding boots and flexing a horse whip in his hands he positively oozes sex appeal." Udall's colleague, Mark Oliver called Alex "dashing", while Dave Lanning called him a "wimp husband". Tony Purnell of the Daily Mirror branded Alex a "cad" and said he was "turning into the biggest baddie on the box." A reporter for the Daily Record called Alex "villainous". A columnist for Inside Soap named Alex and Kim's relationship as one of the "Hot affairs of the Dales", writing that "Lady of the Manor Kim got more than she bargained for when she found out that aristocrat Alex was due to get married to Tara."
