= List of Emmerdale characters introduced in 1999 =

The following is a list of characters that first appeared in the British soap opera Emmerdale in 1999, by order of first appearance.

== Pete Collins ==
Pete Collins
- Emmerdale character
- Portrayed by: Kirk Smith
- Duration: 1999–2000
- First appearance: 27 January 1999
- Last appearance: 21 March 2000
- Introduced by: Kieran Roberts
In-universe information
- Occupation: Van driver

Peter "Pete" Collins, played by Kirk Smith, is known in the village as the lorry driver that crashed into the bus containing Emmerdale residents on the village's main street in 2000. The accident severely injures Butch Dingle and he later died in hospital. Pete is also killed in the accident.

== Ezra Dingle ==
Ezra Dingle
- Emmerdale character
- Portrayed by: John Henshaw
- First appearance: 4 March 1999
- Last appearance: 14 October 1999
- Introduced by: Kieran Roberts
In-universe information
- Father: Jedediah Dingle
- Mother: Peg Dingle
- Brothers: Zak Dingle; Albert Dingle; Caleb Dingle; Shadrach Dingle; Zebediah Dingle
- Wife: Gwen Dingle (1979-present)
- Grandfathers: Jonah Dingle
- Nephews: Butch Dingle; Sam Dingle; Marlon Dingle
- Nieces: Tina Dingle; Mandy Dingle; Belle Dingle
- First cousins: Solomon Dingle; Elvis Dingle

Ezra Dingle is Zak Dingle's (Steve Halliwell) brother. He first appeared in March 1999, alongside his wife, Gwen Dingle, their two children and their dog in an ice-cream van when they arrived at Wishing Well Cottage for the christening of Zak and Lisa Dingle's (Jane Cox) daughter Belle Dingle. He returned in October 1999 for his niece, Mandy Dingle's (Lisa Riley) wedding to Paddy Kirk (Dominic Brunt). Whilst there, he caused trouble outside the village hall and subsequently left the village.

== Gwen Dingle ==
Gwen Dingle
- Emmerdale character
- Portrayed by: Anne Orwin
- First appearance: 4 March 1999
- Last appearance: 9 March 1999
- Introduced by: Kieran Roberts
In-universe information
- Husband: Ezra Dingle (1979-present)

Gwen Dingle is married to Ezra Dingle (John Henshaw), who appears in March 1999 alongside Ezra, their two children and their dog in an ice-cream van when they arrived at Wishing Well Cottage for the christening of Zak and Lisa Dingle's (Jane Cox) daughter Belle Dingle. They got the date for the Christening wrong, so they ended up staying a few days, annoying Lisa. She does not return with Ezra in October 1999 for Mandy Dingle's (Lisa Riley) wedding to Paddy Kirk (Dominic Brunt).

== Angie Reynolds ==
Angie Reynolds
- Emmerdale character
- Portrayed by: Freya Copeland
- Duration: 1999–2002
- First appearance: 25 March 1999
- Last appearance: 22 November 2002
- Introduced by: Kieran Roberts
In-universe information
- Occupation: Police officer
- Husband: Sean Reynolds (until 2002)
- Sons: Marc Reynolds
- Daughters: Ollie Reynolds

Angela "Angie" Reynolds arrived to the village in March 1999 with her husband Sean, son Marc and daughter Ollie. A police sergeant, Angie was eager to move into the village but was frustrated at Sean's delays. She took drastic measures, handcuffing him to the bed until he agreed to sign the contract. She arrested Mandy Dingle after being punched in the face by her.

In 2000, Angie was shocked when Marc was injured in a bus crash, though luckily, his injuries were not critical. Later that year, she was devastated when her best friend, Sarah Sugden, was killed in a barn fire caused by Sarah's adoptive son Andy. Sean accused her of having an affair with Sarah's lover Richie. Then her marriage really hits the rocks when she discovers Sean's affair with Lady Tara Oakwell. Angie took her revenge when she punched her in the face in full view of the punters of The Woolpack. Lady Tara tried to get her arrested but no one claimed to have seen anything. Angie threw Sean out of the house, a move which Ollie resented her for.

In 2001, Angie's father-in-law Len comes to stay following the revelation of Sean and Tara's affair and was happy about it, as he was a great source of comfort for the family. Angie had been miserable and lonely and relented to the attentions of Cain Dingle, a well-known criminal. The fling was exciting and dangerous and she thrived, but the excitement soon wore off. Cain was devastated - he was in love and vowed to get revenge. Meanwhile, Angie and Sean have reconciled and after a holiday together he moves back in. Cain was furious and starts to pursue Ollie, warning Angie to resume the affair or he will sleep with Ollie. Angie was worried sick and agreed. But she was late for the liaison and Cain hotfoots it to a willing Ollie. But unsuspecting Len came into the house as they are upstairs in bed. Cain punches the old man and he falls down the stairs unconscious. Angie blamed herself and when Len came round begged him not to press charges against Cain. She told him about the affair. Len keeps his word but Cain, unsatisfied with justice, wreaked havoc on the Reynolds and tells the whole family all about the affair with Angie and Ollie. Sean was enraged and went after him. He beats Cain up in full view of the village. Cain didn't retaliate and pressed charges against Sean. He also told the police all about the affair with Angie resulting in her suspension from the force. Her whole family was in ruins and she blamed herself. Angie puts in for a transfer. But worse is to come when she found out that Marc was responsible for the death of his school teacher Jean Strickland.

In November 2002, Angie plotted with Cain to rob Tate Haulage being moving away with him. But it was revealed that Angie planned to have him arrested. Cain took off in a Tate van, with Angie and Detective Constable Adrien Collins in hot pursuit. After Cain parked his van in a layby on a blind corner and turned off the lights in order to hide in the darkness, the police car overtook him, left the road, flipped over and crashed. Cain dragged an injured Angie out of the car. She tells him to tell her children that she loves them. Cain begs her to tell him that she loves him but she dies in his arms.

== Frankie Smith ==
Frankie Smith
- Emmerdale character
- Portrayed by: Gina Aris (1999); Madeleine Bowyer (2000-2001)
- Duration: 1999–2001
- First appearance: 13 April 1999
- Last appearance: 26 January 2001
- Introduced by: Kieran Roberts
In-universe information
- Occupation: Lorry driver

Frankie Smith, originally played by Gina Aris, first appeared in 1999, working as a lorry driver for Reynolds Haulage, run by Sean Reynolds (Stephen McGann), which had merged with Chris Tate's (Peter Amory) business, Tate Haulage. She caught the attentions of Chris' sister, Zoe Tate (Leah Bracknell), who subsequently became smitten with her. Zoe was disappointed when Frankie brought her girlfriend, Maggie Cassidy (Juliette Lewis) along to her birthday party. Zoe tried to gain Frankie's affections, but she wanted to stay with Maggie, until she broke up with her and left the village in August 1999.

In January 2000, Frankie returned, now being played by Madeleine Bowyer. This time, she and Zoe built up a relationship, but when one of the Tate Haulage lorries crashed into a bus, killing lorry driver Pete Collins (Kirk Smith) and passengers Butch Dingle (Paul Loughran), it did put their relationship on the rocks as it seemed as though the Tates didn't care, but Zoe proved that she did. In November 2000, their relationship ended when Zoe realised that she didn't have any more feelings for Frankie and in January 2001, Frankie left the village.

== Gavin Ferris ==
Gavin Ferris
- Emmerdale character
- Portrayed by: Robert Beck
- First appearance: 4 May 1999
- Last appearance: 30 December 1999
- Introduced by: Kieran Roberts
In-universe information
- Occupation: Bartender; Landlord

Gavin Ferris, portrayed by Robert Beck, was a bartender at The Woolpack, who was introduced as a love interest for Bernice Blackstock (Samantha Giles), whom he later embarked on a relationship with. He soon bought the pub. Gavin was a womaniser and had previously slept with Tricia Stokes (Sheree Murphy), who he told that he was addicted to women, making her feel cheap, before entering his relationship with Bernice. Gavin and Bernice split up when she and Tricia caught him kissing Tricia's boyfriend, Jason Kirk (James Carlton), and then planned to leave the village. Bernice, who was distraught, trashed his belongings. She claimed she still loved him, but couldn't give him a second chance due to her ex-husband, Anthony Binns, had also turned out to be gay. Gavin decided there was nothing left for him in Emmerdale, so he departed leaving Bernice to find someone else to pay off the mortgage on the pub. In January 2000, two weeks after Gavin left, Tricia asked her grandfather, Alan Turner (Richard Thorp) what would be happening to the pub.

24 years later, in 2023, Beck returned to Emmerdale, playing a different role. This time playing gangster Damon Harris. Beck commented on his return to the programme and referenced Gavin. He said, "I am thrilled to be working on Emmerdale again, it’s a great show that I have followed for years, with a fabulous cast. It has always had a special place in my heart. I had a fantastic time working on the show playing Gavin Ferris, 24 years ago. The cast and crew were so welcoming and of course, I met my wife because of that job so I have much to thank Emmerdale for! I'm looking forward to getting involved and to working with such a great bunch again."

== Richie Carter ==
Richie Carter
- Emmerdale character
- Portrayed by: Glenn Lamont
- Duration: 1999–2001, 2007
- First appearance: 19 May 1999
- Last appearance: 16 October 2007
- Introduced by: Kieran Roberts (1999); Kathleen Beedles (2007)
In-universe information
- Mother: Denise Carter

Richie Carter, played by Glenn Lamont, made his first appearance on 19 May 1999. Richie is perhaps best known for his affair with Sarah Sugden (Alyson Spiro). Lamont reprised the role in 2007 as part of the show's 35th anniversary. A writer for the Bolton News described Richie as "a womaniser". Vikki White of the Daily Mirror listed the scene where Richie and Sarah are caught in a barn fire in their feature on Emmerdale's 40th anniversary as one of the serial's most dramatic disaster storylines.

Richie goes into business with his friend Scott Windsor (Ben Freeman) and rents a room from Sarah and Jack Sugden (Clive Hornby). He develops feelings for Sarah and they soon begin an affair. Sarah agrees to leave Jack, but Richie becomes frustrated when weeks go by and she keeps stalling. He eventually packs her bags for her on the day of the May Fair and when the couple return home, Richie tells Jack the truth. Sarah and Richie leave the farm together. Sarah wins custody of her daughter Victoria (Hannah Midgley), but Richie is not keen on being a father figure to her. Sarah eventually ends the affair. One night Richie asks Sarah if they can talk and they go into a barn at the farm together. They hide when they hear someone enter and assume it is Jack. However, it is Andy Sugden (Kelvin Fletcher), who sets fire to the barn as part of an insurance scam. Richie manages to escape, but Sarah cannot leave as she is too scared. Richie is knocked down by an explosion, but continues to try and save her. Jack rushes out of the house to help, but the barn blows up killing Sarah instantly. Richie later leaves the village. Years later, Victoria (now Isabel Hodgins) tracks Richie down and asks him for the truth about Sarah's death, having long believed that Jack was responsible. Richie says Jack is covering for someone, and even takes the blame, but he becomes scared Victoria will call the police, so he leaves.

== John Wylie ==
John Wylie
- Emmerdale character
- Portrayed by: Seamus O'Neil
- Duration: 1999–2000
- First appearance: 16 June 1999
- Last appearance: 4 April 2000
- Introduced by: Kieran Roberts
In-universe information
- Daughters: Emily Kirk

John Wylie, played by Seamus O'Neill, is the over protective father of Emily Wylie. He disapproves of Emily's relationship with Butch Dingle. While arguing with the couple, John attempts to hit Emily, but Butch punches him. John refused to let Emily see Butch, which lead to a fight between them. They soon get into a car chase, and John nearly crashes into a farmer, before flipping his land rover. Butch saves John and Emily before the car explodes. Although he warms to Butch, John continues to split him and Emily up. He spends Christmas with the Dingle family and he soon realises what Emily sees in Butch. After Butch death, John attends his funeral and comforts his daughter.

== Ollie Reynolds ==
Ollie Reynolds
- Emmerdale character
- Portrayed by: Vicky Binns
- Duration: 1999–2003
- First appearance: 17 June 1999
- Last appearance: 1 October 2003
- Introduced by: Kieran Roberts
In-universe information
- Occupation: Student
- Father: Sean Reynolds
- Mother: Angie Reynolds
- Brothers: Marc Reynolds
- Grandfathers: Len Reynolds
- Grandmothers: Eileen Reynolds

Ollie Reynolds, played by Vicky Binns, made her first appearance on 17 June 1999. She departed on 1 October 2003.

Ollie arrived in the village in summer 1999, and instantly came across as the tomboy of the Reynolds family. Ollie got herself into a lot of trouble in autumn 1999 including various scams with Zak Dingle and getting drunk, leading to Mandy Dingle getting sent to prison for three months. Ollie was convinced her parents didn't care about her because they were always working, and ran away from home in 2000. In spring 2000, after some financial trouble with Tate haulage her father developed financial issues, learning he could lose the house, having been in the Sugden's house with Andy and Robert, Ollie had seen some valuable Jewellery she realised it could be the answer to all her father's money problems. Ollie decided to break into farm while she was meant to be at school, and steal some jewellery including Sarah's engagement ring. She found some of the jewels hidden in the fridge and made her getaway. Unfortunately, she hadn't counted on her mother Angie attending the scene after Paddy and Zoe who were working on some baby deer in a nearby barn noticed a door had been opened with a tool. Angie realized this when found it in Ollie's school bag. Shocked, they decided to give Ollie a mock arrest and visit to the police station by her mother as a punishment after Jack and Sarah agreed not press charges due to her being a minor. Not long after the burglary, Ollie was shocked to learn about her fathers affair with Lady Tara. She hated her parents even more, and continued to be led off the rails by Cain Dingle.

In 2001, she continued to fall for Cain, and they got closer. Ollie was very unaware that Cain was only after her to get at Angie. Ollie even slept with Cain, and when the truth came out about why Cain was chasing Ollie, she left home and moved in with the Daggerts. Ollie kept getting closer to Danny, and tried to repair her relationship with Angie. Eventually Ollie moved home. But in September 2001 seven teenagers, including her older brother Marc were involved in the hit and run of their head teacher. At first the gang tried to hide their involvement, but Ollie broke down and revealed all to Danny. Marc confessed and the others were all taken into custody. Marc was sent to prison for a year, and Ollie was devastated. Her friendship with Danny continued to grow, although Latisha speculated that Danny might be gay.

Eventually Ollie started dating Danny and the relationship got serious. As the months went on Danny and Ollie became more and more serious. Ollie was devastated when, while she was away at her father and Tara's engagement party, her mother was killed in a car crash, caused by Ollie's one-time boyfriend Cain Dingle. The pain was made even worse because Ollie had fought with her mother over Cain before Angie's death. After his family left the village Danny moved in with Ollie and Len, into the Reynolds home. But later Ollie moved out as Chris Tate tried to buy the house for a development he was planning. Ollie leaves the village and moves to Manchester to go to university.

== Marc Reynolds ==
Marc Reynolds
- Emmerdale character
- Portrayed by: Anthony Lewis
- Duration: 1999–2002, 2007
- First appearance: 17 June 1999
- Last appearance: 28 May 2007
- Introduced by: Kieran Roberts (1999); Kathleen Beedles (2007)
In-universe information
- Occupation: Student
- Father: Sean Reynolds
- Mother: Angie Reynolds
- Sisters: Ollie Reynolds
- Grandfathers: Len Reynolds
- Grandmothers: Eileen Reynolds

Marc Reynolds, played by Anthony Lewis, made his first screen appearance on 17 June. He departed in 2002, but made a brief reappearance in 2007 for the funeral of his grandfather. Lewis previously appeared in the show in August 1993 as a background character during the arrival of the Windsor family. In May 2007, it was announced that Lewis would be returning for the funeral of onscreen grandfather, Len (Peter Martin)

Marc arrived in the village in June 1999 along with his family: his father Sean (Stephen McGann), his mother Angie (Freya Copeland) and his younger sister Ollie (Vicky Binns). Marc and Ollie enrol at Hotten Comprehensive and befriend fellow students Andy (Kelvin Fletcher) and Robert Sugden (Christopher Smith) and Donna Windsor (Verity Rushworth).

Marc begins dating Donna and loses his virginity to her. Marc and Donna continue sleeping together until they are caught in bed together by Donna's mother Viv (Deena Payne). Viv later tells Angie and Marc's relationship with Donna subsequently ends. Marc then begins a relationship with newcomer Eve Birch (Raine Davison).

Marc, Ollie, Eve, Donna, Andy, Robert (now Karl Davies) and Katie Addyman (Sammy Winward) go on a night out in Hotten, where they go to a nightclub. After missing the last bus back to Emmerdale, Andy steals a car and Marc agreed to drive the group home. However while driving back to the village they run over their headmistress Jean Strickland (Alex Hall), who dies instantly. The group manage to destroy the evidence and hide their guilt, but after months of sneaking around Marc confesses and was sent to prison for a year for causing death by dangerous driving, while the rest of the group are sentenced to committing community service.

Upon his release from prison, Marc disapproves of his mother's relationship with Cain Dingle (Jeff Hordley). When Angie later dies in a car accident, Marc leaves the village to live with Sean in Cheshire. Marc returns to the village briefly in May 2007 along with his stepmother Tara Thornfield (Anna Brecon) for the funeral of his grandfather, Len Reynolds.

== Liam Hammond ==
Liam Hammond
- Emmerdale character
- Portrayed by: Mark Powley
- First appearance: 31 August 1999
- Last appearance: 12 November 1999
- Introduced by: Kieran Roberts
In-universe information
- Father: Frank Tate
- Stepmother: Kim Tate
- Half-brothers: Chris Tate; Jamie Tate; Caleb Miligan
- Half-sisters: Zoe Tate
- Nephews: Joe Tate; Noah Dingle; Nicky Miligan; Thomas Tate
- Nieces: Jean Tate; Millie Tate; Steph Miligan

Liam James Hammond is the illegitimate son of Frank Tate. He appeared in 1999.

Liam first appears in 1999 as an employee of Tate Haulage. He kidnaps Chris Tate, and is revealed as the illegitimate child of Chris's father, Frank. Chris's sister Zoe is also kidnapped when she takes a ransom to Liam. However, on 11 November 1999, she shoots Liam and they escape. He is buried next to his father and half-brother, who share a grave. Zoe is arrested but the outcome is lawful killing.

== Claudia Nash ==
Claudia Nash
- Emmerdale character
- Portrayed by: Susan Duerden
- Duration: 1999-2000
- First appearance: 9 September 1999
- Last appearance: 9 May 2000
- Introduced by: Kieran Roberts
In-universe information
- Occupation: Nanny

Claudia Nash was the live-in nanny for Joseph Tate (Oliver Young). Claudia regularly butted heads with Joseph's father, Chris Tate (Peter Amory), but got on very well with his sister, Zoe Tate (Leah Bracknell) and her partner, Frankie Smith (Madeleine Bowyer). The animosity caused Chris to fire her and she subsequently packed her things and left the village, whilst Chris continued to taunt her.

== Diane Sugden ==
Diane Sugden (also Lambert and Blackstock), played by Elizabeth Estensen, made her first appearance on 23 November 1999. She has been given major storylines to tackle, her most memorable was probably her battle with colon cancer. She has had a rocky marriage to Rodney Blackstock (Patrick Mower), a strained relationship with her sister Val (Charlie Hardwick) and was also married local farmer Jack Sugden (Clive Hornby). She also became landlady of the local pub, The Woolpack, and had to cope with the death of Jack. In October 2013, Diane was taken hostage by Cameron Murray (Dominic Power) during a siege in The Woolpack.
