= Dave Glover =

Fictional character from Emmerdale

- Emmerdale character
- Portrayed by: Ian Kelsey
- Duration: 1994–1996
- First appearance: 4 August 1994
- Last appearance: 20 December 2001
- Introduced by: Mervyn Watson
In-universe information
- Occupation: Farmhand
- Father: Ned Glover
- Mother: Jan Glover
- Brothers: Roy Glover
- Sisters: Linda Fowler
- Wife: Kathy Tate (1996)
- Aunts: June Worrel

David "Dave" Glover is a fictional character from the British television soap opera Emmerdale, played by Ian Kelsey. He made his first appearance during the episode broadcast on 4 August 1994. The character was introduced in a bid to attract a younger audience to the show. When Kelsey opted to leave the show, producers chose to kill his character off and Dave made his last appearance on 26 December 1996.

== Casting ==
In August 1994, a columnist for Inside Soap said Kelsey was expected to get pulses racing in Emmerdale when he made his debut appearance as Dave Glover, a member of a "roving gypsy clan". They called him "yet another teen heart throb" and said his "rough and ready looks" would put Noah Huntley's character Luke McAllister in the shade. Kelsey said he could not wait to get going on the soap and that he had some good storylines lined up. Dave and Luke were introduced in an attempt to attract a young audience. Kelsey revealed that he had to lie about his age while he was a member of the cast. Kelsey was twenty-seven when he joined Emmerdale and his character was supposed to be nineteen. The actor told Sue Malins of Soaplife "They said I'd never be a pin-up in the teen mags if everyone knew I was so old, so I had to pretend to be 21."

== Development ==
In 1995, Dave tells Kathy Tate (Malandra Burrows) that he is in love with her. Kathy is a luckless in love character that has a knack for choosing the wrong men. Emmerdale were portraying Kathy as being uninterested in relationships at the time of Dave's declaration; which results in her rejecting his advances. Burrows told Victoria Ross from Inside Soap that she could not blame Kathy for "hanging back a bit" and she "hated" the idea of Kathy beginning a new relationship. While she believed that her character was not ready for romance; Burrows said that Dave had the potential to be Kathy's love interest because he was "very similar" to her first husband, Jackie Merrick (Ian Sharrock).

Dave later starts a relationship with Kathy. When she imposes a sex ban until they marry, Dave resumes an old affair with Kim Tate (Claire King). King told Inside Soap's Ross that Kim is "totally in love with Dave". Kim's initial reaction to Dave is "phroar, I fancy a bit of that". As Kim fills the role of the "bitch", she knows what she wants and exactly how to get it. King explained that the adventurous sex between Dave and Kim leaves her hooked on him. She opined that they "have a pretty good sex life" because they do it in stables and on office desks, rather than a bed. Kelsey said that Dave enjoys playing with Kim's "fire" and would not be interested in her if she were single. Ultimately "it's the wanton streak in Kim that Dave finds so irresistible". Dave becomes more involved with Kim over time. Eventually Kim decides that she wants a larger share in Frank's estate and plans to achieve this by having his baby. However, Frank has a low sperm count which improves the chances that the baby could be Dave's. King revealed that Kim would often try to give him special treatment at his work place. While Kelsey said that Dave always runs back to Kathy for "a cup of tea and a bun", but having a baby changes that dynamic. If he was the father, Dave would "probably" stand by Kim as he would be "proud as punch to be a dad". Off-screen King was married to fellow Emmerdale cast member Peter Amory (who plays Chris Tate), who would often tease her for Kim's romance with Dave. With the storyline came heightened publicity. Kelsey felt that this made his work load heavier and was required to attend various photo shoots to promote the affair.

When Frank discovers their affair, he offers Kim one million pounds to leave Dave and tell everyone the baby is his. King told Helen Childs from Inside Soap that Kim loves Dave, but she sees but the offer of money is too tempting. She added that it was good that Kim found love with Dave, but the offer ruins everything. King, Kelsey and many viewers thought that the baby would turn out to be Frank's. King said that it would be a "good twist" if Dave turned out to be the father.

In September 1996, The People's Sayid Ruki reported Kelsey would be leaving the soap at the end of the year. When Kelsey decided to leave, producers devised a dramatic exit storyline for his character. Special effects designer Ian Rowley set up a reconstruction of a fire. Half of the scenes were shot on location, while the rest were carried out in a studio. Instead of using their usual studios, Emmerdale opted to use Yorkshire Television's main Studio 3. At the time the fire was the largest fire ever undertaken with the company. A stuntman took Kelsey's place in various scenes. The location filming took place at Creskeld Hall, the actual setting of Home Farm and this was manned by Barbara Shaw. They built and extra storey to the building and installed fire bars which were manipulated to set the room alight. Producers had decided that they wanted a dramatic end for Dave's involvement with the fire. In the episode Dave is badly burnt by flaming curtains that fall onto him. During filming the stuntman was logistically placed and dodged the curtains and crawled away, creating the illusion that Dave is underneath them. They then launched a fireball through the window to complete the sequence, all of filming at Creskeld Hall was done in one take. Kelsey told the Daily Record's Paul English, that he was unsure if he would "shake off Dave Glover" because "millions of people" watched his exit. He added that Dave getting killed off could not have been more dramatic.

== Storylines ==
Dave arrives in the village with his parents and younger siblings; Roy (Nicky Evans) and Linda (Tonicha Jeronimo). He is given a job as a farmhand at Home Farm by Frank. Dave begins an affair with Frank's wife Kim, unaware that Frank knows. They are caught out when Frank gives Dave a cottage on the estate and has microphones and cameras planted inside. Frank walks in on them and sacks Dave. Kim then moves Dave into Home Farm, but he becomes fed up of the bickering between her and Frank. Dave and Kim move out and his father, Ned (Johnny Leeze), disowns him. Kim realises she is pregnant and Frank starts divorce proceedings. Frank then offers Kim £1 million to leave Dave and move back into Home Farm. Kim returns to Frank, telling Dave that he is not the father of her child.

Kim gives birth to a boy, who she names James. Dave remains in love with Kim and believes he is James' father, but when Frank does not let him near Kim, Dave turns to his ex-lover, Kathy. They begin a relationship and Kathy proposes to Dave, who accepts. They marry at a registry office in secret. Kim decides to leave the village with James and she persuades Dave to go with her. Dave decides to leave Linda's wedding reception to meet Kim at Home Farm. Frank returns and he confronts Dave and Kim. They suddenly notice a fire has broken out in the nursery and Dave runs in to save James, who he manages to pass out through a window. Dave then becomes trapped by the fire, but he is eventually rescued. He is rushed to hospital, where his family keep a bedside vigil but Dave dies from his injuries.

In December 2001, When Kathy leaves the village she has various flashbacks some of which include her and Dave, In her flashbacks she remembers when they fell in love with each other and when Dave died.

== Reception ==
For his portrayal of Dave, Kelsey was nominated for "Most Popular Newcomer" at the 1995 National Television Awards. At the 1996 Inside Soap Awards the love triangle between Dave, Kim and Frank was awarded "Best Soap Plot". A What's on TV columnist named Dave as one of "The Top 100 Soap Hunks of All Time". A columnist from Inside Soap said that Dave and Kathy would have fond memories of their wedding day. The pair had smiles "of genuine joy, and they have all but buried their miserable pasts". They also opined that Kathy married "the love of her life" and Dave always knew she "was the only girl for him". A columnist from Hello said Dave was "romantically-challenged", while Paul English of the Daily Record branded him "ultimately heroic". Inside Soap's Victoria Ross said the Kim-Dave-Kathy love triangle was one of Emmerdale's most successful plots ever.
