= Sean Reynolds =

Sean Reynolds may refer to:

- Sean K. Reynolds, American game designer
- Sean Reynolds (Emmerdale), a fictional character from the British soap opera Emmerdale
- Sean Reynolds (soccer) (born 1990), American soccer player
- Sean Reynolds (RAF officer), British air marshal
- Sean Reynolds (baseball) (born 1998), American baseball player
