= Biff Fowler =

Fictional character from Emmerdale

- Emmerdale character
- Portrayed by: Stuart Wade
- Duration: 1994–1999, 2005
- First appearance: 10 March 1994
- Last appearance: 1 November 2005
- Created by: Mervyn Watson
- Introduced by: Mervyn Watson (1994); Kathleen Beedles (2005)
In-universe information
- Occupation: Barman
- Father: Ron Hudson
- Mother: Sandra Fowler
- Wife: Linda Fowler (1996–1997)

Brian Ian Francis "Biff" Fowler is a fictional character from the British television soap opera Emmerdale, played by Stuart Wade from 1994 until 1999. Wade reprised his role as Biff in 2005 in a one-off appearance for Seth Armstrong's (Stan Richards) funeral.

== Development ==
Three weeks after starting drama college, Wade was cast as Biff. He was initially contracted for five months. He was introduced as a friend of Luke McAllister (Noah Huntley). Of his character, Wade commented "He's a bit of a thug. He strikes up a friendship with Luke because they share a passion for bikes. And he's just the type of guy to lead Luke astray." Biff and Luke were members of the show's new "brat pack", along with Luke's sister Jessica McAllister (Camilla Power) and Dolores Sharp (Samantha Hurst). The characters were credited with giving the soap "a whole new look", and their friendship and romance storylines also become popular with viewers.

Wade reprised the role in 2005 for Seth Armstrong's (Stan Richards) funeral.

== Storylines ==
Biff first appears in Emmerdale as a biker and school friend of Luke McAllister. Biff has a romance with Luke's sister, Jessica and later moves in with Betty Eagleton (Paula Tilbrook) and Seth Armstrong as their lodger. Following Jessica's departure, He then begins dating Linda Glover (Tonicha Jeronimo) and they marry on Christmas Eve 1996, however the day is marred by Linda's brother Dave Glover (Ian Kelsey) being caught in a fire at home farm and further tragedy strikes when Dave dies the following day in hospital.

Biff and Linda are delighted when Linda falls pregnant in early 1997; but their happiness is cut short when she has a miscarriage. Linda is killed in a car crash in October 1997 as a result of Lord Alex Oakwell (Rupam Maxwell) being high on cocaine, which leaves Biff devastated. He then has a one-night stand with Kelly Windsor (Adele Silva), his brother-in-law Roy's (Nicky Evans) girlfriend, the following month. Kelly becomes pregnant but miscarries after she is pushed down the stairs by Kim Tate (Claire King). The following year, Biff has a fling with Alex's ex-wife Lady Tara Oakwell (Anna Brecon) but she dumps him to marry Lord Michael Thornfield (Malcolm Stoddard). Biff then begins dating Kathy Glover (Malandra Burrows), Dave's widow, and they plans to marry but on their wedding day, Graham Clark (Kevin Pallister) shows up and Biff began to have doubts about marrying Kathy as he realises that Kathy saw a lot of Graham and was close to him. Biff jilted her at the altar, leaving Kathy distraught. Marlon Dingle (Mark Charnock) wonders whether he will see his good friend again and Biff rode off on his motorbike, into the sunset.

Six years later, Biff briefly returns to Emmerdale, following the death of Seth. He meets a grieving Betty, who is reliving memories of Seth in his shed. Biff tells Betty that she can stay in Keeper's Cottage for as long as she likes, despite her offering to move out. Biff comforts Betty as she explains that she does not want Seth to be cremated and he suggests that she stop the cremation after the wake. Biff attends the wake in The Woolpack and leaves again, following the funeral.

== Reception ==
Paul Simper of the Radio Times observed that Biff was "unlucky in love" throughout his time in the show, but thought he was "something of a catch in Emmerdale, a grafter with a good heart and his own set of wheels."
