= Tara Thornfield =

Fictional character from Emmerdale

- Emmerdale character
- Portrayed by: Anna Brecon
- Duration: 1997–1998, 2000–2002, 2007
- First appearance: 31 July 1997
- Last appearance: 28 May 2007
- Introduced by: Mervyn Watson (1997); Kieran Roberts (2000); Kathleen Beedles (2007)
In-universe information
- Occupation: Businesswoman
- Husband: Lord Alex Oakwell (1997–1998); Lord Michael Thornfield (1998–2000); Sean Reynolds (2002–)
- Stepsons: Marc Reynolds
- Stepdaughters: Ollie Reynolds
- Nephews: Julian Simmonsbury

Lady Tara Thornfield (also Cockburn and Lady Oakwell) is a fictional character from the British soap opera Emmerdale, played by Anna Brecon. She made her first on screen appearance on 31 July 1997. She remained on and off in the show until departing on 4 January 2002 for a new life with Sean Reynolds (Stephen McGann), whom she later married, but made a brief return with step-son, Marc (Anthony Lewis), in 2007 for her father-in-law Len's funeral.

== Casting ==
Brecon made her first appearance as Tara on 31 July 1997. The actress quit the role in September 1998 to move onto other projects. Brecon revealed "It's my decision. It will be sad because the people here couldn't be lovelier and it's such a good job. But I don't need the security of long-term work at this time in my life. If I had children or was settled down then things might be different, but for the moment I just want to try out other things." Two years later, Brecon returned to Emmerdale. The actress revealed that while she was away she had done some theatre and film work, but she was ready to go back to the soap. When asked if she missed Emmerdale, Brecon said "I don't regret leaving as I wanted other challenges but I did miss the camaraderie of being on the show, and I missed playing Tara as the role was great fun." Brecon confirmed that she would be staying for "a decent spell". In May 2007, Peter Martin's character, Len Reynolds, was killed off and Brecon reprised her role for her on-screen father-in-law's funeral.

== Development ==
A writer for Soaplife described Tara as being born with a silver spoon in her mouth. They added "she's a devious debutante who knows how to box clever." Brecon told Ellie Gonower of the same publication that the writers wrote well for her and called her character "great fun". She explained that Tara has a lot of comedy in her, and she was always running around like a bull in a china shop. Brecon modelled Tara on British socialites Tara Palmer-Tomkinson and Tamara Beckwith. Her mother's influence also came through in her portrayal of the character. Brecon explained "I find myself becoming my mum in scenes where I have to be angry or forceful. She'll probably kill me for saying it. It's strange because my mum is not a forceful person at all, but I guess she must be my idea of authority." The actress said that her initial appearances as Tara often saw her wearing short dresses and acting a bit dense, while she was tagged on the side of Lord Alex Oakwell (Rupam Maxwell). Brecon revealed that it was great when she got to build Tara up into a major character.

When Tara faced financial ruin, she agreed to marry Lord Michael Thornfield (Malcolm Stoddard). Shortly before the wedding, Tara's former lover Biff Fowler (Stuart Wade) turned up and asked her to reconsider. Of Tara's dilemma, Brecon stated "Tara doesn't know which way to turn. Michael offers her the financial security she desperately needs, but Biff is the true love of her life." The storyline led to Tara's departure from Emmerdale, but Brecon said the plot would allow her to return in the future.

== Storylines ==
Tara was famous for "stirring up trouble" amongst the villagers. She also became unpopular for evicting a lot of people from their property. She had passionate love affairs with Biff Fowler (Stuart Wade) and Sean Reynolds (Stephen McGann). She eventually gave into her feelings for Sean and they drove off into the sunset together to set up a new life in Cheshire. Tara was the first resident of Oakwell Hall which has since been occupied by Rosemary Sinclair (Linda Thorson). She also purchased Home Farm from Zoe Tate (Leah Bracknell) when Zoe was experiencing financial difficulties. This angered Zoe and also Zoe's brother Chris Tate (Peter Amory). She was previously married to Lord Alex Oakwell (Rupam Maxwell) and Lord Michael Thornfield (Malcolm Stoddard). Tara Reynolds returned on 27 May 2007 to the village for Len's funeral. Viewers have since learned she married Sean.

== Reception ==
For her portrayal of Tara, Brecon was named Most Popular Newcomer at the 4th National Television Awards. The actress also won Best Soap Newcomer at the 1998 TV Choice awards and the Inside Soap Awards. Of Tara's first wedding to Alex, The People's Dave Lanning quipped "Ladylike and luscious, Anna Brecon burned like a beacon as Lord Alex Oakwell's bride Tara in another soap wedding celebration in Emmerdale. But will tasty Tara last the course? And how will the new Lady Oakwell react when she discovers her rival Kim Tate is a vamp? It promises to be horsewhips at three paces..." Of the one-hour special featuring Alex's return, Lanning commented "Erotic excitement of the week: Lady Tara Oakwell (Anna Brecon), the height of haughty couture, grovelling in the mud in designer mini skirt and wrestling with her wimp husband Lord Alex in Emmerdale (ITV). But Tara apart, the hour-long special went outrageously over the top more often than English crosses against Chile."

Tara was named as one of "The 30 greatest Emmerdale residents" by a writer for Inside Soap. They said "Snooty Lady Tara graced Emmerdale with her presence in 1997 and soon set her sights on a bit of rough – her driver, Biff Fowler. After a couple of years away, she swanned back to the village and fell for another bit of rough – married man Sean Reynolds. Lady Tara? More like Lady Chatterly!" Tara was included in a What's on TV feature on "The 50 most EVIL soap villains of all time", with a reporter saying "Lady Tara Thornfield (Anna Brecon) caused lots of trouble for the villagers of Emmerdale before driving off into the sunset with lover Sean Reynolds."
