= Graham Clark (Emmerdale) =

Fictional character from Emmerdale

- Emmerdale character
- Portrayed by: Kevin Pallister
- Duration: 1998–2000
- First appearance: 19 August 1998
- Last appearance: 18 February 2000
- Introduced by: Mervyn Watson
In-universe information
- Occupation: Schoolteacher
- Wife: Rebecca Clark (backstory)

Graham Clark is a fictional character from the British soap opera Emmerdale, played by Kevin Pallister. He made his first screen appearance during the episode broadcast on 19 August 1998.

== Creation and casting ==
In early August 1998, Steven Murphy of Inside Soap reported that Rachel Hughes (Glenda McKay) would gain a new love interest in the form of "a handsome teacher" called Graham. Murphy said "But in traditional soap style, all isn't going to exactly to plan with the budding romance."

== Storylines ==
Graham is a local schoolteacher who looks around Keeper's Cottage after Lady Tara Oakwell (Anna Brecon) evicts Seth Armstrong (Stan Richards) and Betty Eagleton (Paula Tilbrook). When he discovers the reason for the sale, he refuses to buy it. He began dating Rachel Hughes. Graham at first appeared to be a perfect boyfriend for Rachel. He moved in with her and redecorated her home, cooked and even alphabetised her CD collection. But gradually Graham began to take control of Rachel's life. He got her to dress differently and dye her hair auburn so that she resembled his dead wife. Graham later took Rachel for a walk in the countryside and Rachel realised that Graham had an overwhelming desire to control every woman he dated. Rachel tried to escape but Graham tried to force himself on her and she fled away in fear until Graham trapped her on a clifftop. After a short talk, Rachel realised Graham had murdered his wife and made it look like she had committed suicide. Graham then pushed Rachel off the cliff and killed her.

He later went to the police station and reported Rachel missing and joined the search to find her to avoid suspicion. When he arrived at the place where she had fallen, Graham pretended to have just come across her body to divert suspicion away from him.

Graham pretended to be grief-stricken and told Eric Pollard (Chris Chittell) that Rachel had accepted his marriage proposal to her. But Eric had spoken to Rachel the day before her death and knew that she had been thinking of ending her relationship with Graham. Eric was suspicious of Graham and, believing he had killed Rachel, he tried to find incriminating evidence against Graham but was unsuccessful.

After Rachel's death Graham moved on to her friend Kathy Glover (Malandra Burrows). Kathy had been engaged to Biff Fowler (Stuart Wade) but Biff was convinced that Kathy was attracted to Graham. In an attempt to break up their relationship Graham actively encouraged Biff to think that there was an attraction between them. Finally on his and Kathy's wedding day Biff saw that Kathy was watching out for Graham to arrive and he decided that as she was not committed to him he jilted her at the altar and rode off on his motorbike.

With Biff gone Graham could start a relationship with Kathy and they later planned to marry. When Eric accused Graham of murdering Rachel, he left the village with Kathy and took her on a romantic weekend away.

While driving with Graham it became clear to Kathy that there was something wrong with Graham and when he realised her suspicions he tried to gain control of the car but it went off the road and teetered on a cliff edge before finally falling over the edge. The car ended up bursting into flames when it landed on the beach and Graham was killed. Kathy managed to get out of the car in the last second and was helped up the cliff by Eric and Marlon Dingle (Mark Charnock) who had been in pursuit.
