= Roy Glover =

Fictional character from Emmerdale

- Emmerdale character
- Portrayed by: Nicky Evans
- Duration: 1994–2000
- First appearance: 4 August 1994
- Last appearance: 22 August 2000
- Introduced by: Mervyn Watson
- Spin-off appearances: Revenge (1998)
In-universe information
- Occupation: Student; Mechanic; Cleaner
- Father: Ned Glover
- Mother: Jan Glover
- Brothers: Dave Glover
- Sisters: Linda Fowler
- Wife: Kelly Windsor (1999–2000)

Roy Glover is a fictional character from the British television soap opera Emmerdale, played by Nicky Evans. He made his first appearance during the episode broadcast on 4 August 1994, and departed six years later on 22 August 2000.

== Development ==
The five-strong Glover family, consisting of parents Ned Glover (Johnny Leeze) and Jan Glover (Roberta Kerr), and their three children Dave Glover (Ian Kelsey), Linda Glover (Tonicha Jeronimo) and Roy were introduced in August 1994. In their fictional backstory, the Glovers came from the South, like the McAllisters and Windsors who were introduced in 1993, but they were a hardworking Yorkshire family. The Glovers initially live in a caravan on the Sugden's land, after being forced out of their old plot by developers. Roy is the youngest member of the family, and an Inside Soap columnist predicted he would make friends with fellow teen Scott Windsor (Ben Freeman) and get up to "plenty of pranks".

In a notable storyline for the character, Roy almost loses two fingers in an accident with a wood-chopping machine. Roy cuts his fingers off as he is left unsupervised and his hand slips. Evans described it as "quite a graphic scene when the camera moves in and you see my hand without them." He also said it was "a difficult scene" as they had to film multiple takes to get "the horror over without being too sickening." Roy's sister saves his fingers and he undergoes surgery to reattach them. Evans was initially delighted when he received the script for the scenes, before realising how long the storyline would span, as Roy goes through months of recovery. Evans had to wear a splint for six months and he had difficulty filming with it on. He added, "It is certainly one of the most dramatic moments I've been involved in on Emmerdale and I was really pleased with the way the scene looks."

Evans chose to leave Emmerdale in 2000.

== Storylines ==
Roy moves to the village with his parents Ned and Jan, and his older siblings Dave and Linda. Roy befriends Scott Windsor and his step-sister Kelly Windsor (Adele Silva) at school. Roy and Kelly have a brief romantic relationship. Roy is a troublesome teenager. When Linda and her boyfriend Biff Fowler (Stuart Wade) clean Alan Turner's (Richard Thorp) Landrover for him, Roy throws mud and dirt all over it, so he can clean it again and get paid. Roy loses two of his fingers in an accident with a circular saw whilst cutting some wood and spends time in hospital where he has them surgically reattached. Both of Roy's older siblings die, Dave in a fire at Home Farm and Linda in a car crash, leaving him the last surviving Glover child. Roy and Kelly get back together, and eventually marry. Scott reveals that he and Kelly have been having an affair, but Kelly denies everything and Roy believes her. Once married, Roy and Kelly suffer financial difficulties and take cleaning jobs. Kelly borrows some jewellery from one of their clients and holds a dinner party at their home. When the police are called, Roy protects Kelly and takes the blame, leading to his arrest and imprisonment. When he is released, Kelly finally admits that she has been having an affair with Scott, and plans to move to London. Roy forgives her and he and Kelly briefly reconcile. They decide to start a new life in Ibiza, with Roy's father Ned (Johnny Leeze) but as they are about to leave, Kelly reveals that she intends for them to scam Ned and his girlfriend Dawn Wilkins out of their business and take it over. Angry that Kelly has not changed and is still as ruthless as ever, Roy breaks up with her in the airport and leaves her there, departing for Ibiza alone.

== Reception ==
Lamenting the character's departure, Robert Beaumont of The Press wrote: "Poor Roy is an icon to losers in the land, a living reminder that life can be worse. How he has survived with this spoiled bitch of a wife Kelly is a mystery to all of us. So, too, is his hair." The Guardian's Gareth McLean branded Roy "saintly but simple". Molly Blake from Birmingham Evening Mail was pleased that Roy broke up with Kelly, saying "Oh, yes! At long last Roy Glover has discovered he'll be happier snuggling up with his sideburns than with sourpuss and promiscuous Kelly, ditching her at the airport en route to Ibiza where's he's to live with dad, the Neanderthally slow-thinking Ned."
