= Sally Walsh =

American interior designer

Sally Walsh (April 1, 1926 – January 12, 1992) was an American interior designer best known for her work in the Houston area in the "contemporary" style of the period. She is credited for "convincing Houston’s corporations and institutions to embrace modernity through the sheer force of her personality and the power of her design". She was inducted into the Interior Design Hall of Fame in 1986. Walsh was Partner in Charge at S. I. Morris Associates from 1971 to 1978.

== Early life and training ==
Walsh was born in Inspiration, Arizona, on April 1, 1926. From ages 6 to 10, she attended schools at the Anaconda Mining Camps where her father worked, and graduated from high school in Sioux Falls, South Dakota.

She attended Augustana College, but dropped out because she was bored with the course. Moving to Chicago, at the age of 19 landed a job with Hans Knoll, the co-founder of a major design company and furniture manufacturer. She recalled that, during her six years as Knoll's assistant, she "typed, walked the sheep dog, waited on customers in the showroom, watched Hans present one incredible Planning Unit project after another, called on architectural firms in five states, cut thousands of perfect rectangles out of fabrics and pasted them on plans, flew to Manila to find out why Knoll furniture was arriving in Japan with spool legs, designed spaces, found showroom sites in San Francisco, kept a sharp eye out for imaginative furniture/textiles, decorated the Christmas tree with cookies flown in from Germany, and cried when [she] displeased the fifth God—Hans." Her responsibilities gradually grew until she was manager of a department.

== Career ==
In 1955, she moved to Houston and planned to open a Knoll office there, but Hans Knoll died before these plans took form. After forming her own shop, she was hired by Wilson Stationery & Printing, where she brought in a Knoll dealership. Walsh practiced interior design while at Wilson and introduced modern furniture to Houston. The interior design she completed during this stage of her career included the Schlumberger offices; a 1968 Rodin exhibit for The Museum of Fine Arts, Houston; and The University Center Building at the University of Houston. She retained a connection with Knoll, designing the interior of Knoll International's Houston showroom.

In 1971, Walsh joined S. I. Morris Associates as Partner in Charge of Interior Design. Walsh designed the interiors for Houston's first open office building, which was published in the April 1974 issue of Interior Magazine. She also designed the interiors for the Braniff International Airways Headquarters and the Rice Memorial Center at Rice University. During this period, she also designed the interior of Houston's Central Public Library, a design lost through a remodelling project in 2008.

From 1980, she worked independently. In 1986, she was inducted in the Interior Design Hall of Fame, the first Houstonian to be admitted. She died from leukaemia on January 12, 1992. Her name is recognized by many because of the lecture series endowed by Raymond Brochstein and named in her honor, as she "brought modern design to Houston and became an inspiration to a whole generation of Houston architects and designers." Her prototype for an executive desk is held by the MFAH.
