= Sean Reynolds (Emmerdale) =

Fictional character from Emmerdale

- Emmerdale character
- Portrayed by: Stephen McGann
- Duration: 1999–2002
- First appearance: 10 March 1999
- Last appearance: 4 January 2002
- Introduced by: Kieran Roberts
In-universe information
- Occupation: Haulage manager
- Father: Len Reynolds
- Mother: Eileen Reynolds
- Wife: Angie Reynolds (until 2002); Tara Thornfield (2002–present)
- Sons: Marc Reynolds
- Daughters: Ollie Reynolds

Sean Reynolds is a fictional character from the British ITV soap opera Emmerdale, played by Stephen McGann. He made his first screen appearance during the episode broadcast on 10 March 1999.

== Casting ==
McGann joined the cast of Emmerdale as Sean, the patriarch of the Reynolds family, in February 1999. The role of Sean marked McGann's return to television following an absence of several years. The actor revealed he had some initial reservations about joining Emmerdale, but as soon as he arrived on set they did not last long. McGann said "Within minutes of arriving I felt I knew what I was doing here and I was enjoying it. There's good and bad in every genre, whether it's films, television or theatre, but I have to say I think I've picked a good soap."

In November 2001, McGann announced he was quitting his role as Sean. The actor made his final screen appearance as Sean on 4 January 2002. Shortly after McGann departed Emmerdale, producers axed his character's family, saying they could not develop them any further.

== Development ==
Sean was introduced as a haulage boss and "disgruntled rival" of Chris Tate (Peter Amory). He becomes determined to put Chris out of business and McGann commented "The town ain't big enough for the both of them. Sean is a ruthless and sly operator. He's going to employ all sorts of underhand tactics to get what he wants. This feud is going to run and run." Sean and his family later moved into the village and his wife Angie (Freya Copeland) suggested he and Chris become partners in Tate Haulage. A writer for the Finnish television station, MTV3 described Sean as "a decent family man and hard-working employee." Inside Soap's Steven Murphy described Sean as "hard-nosed". McGann admitted he loved playing "the edginess" of his character, saying "If you are playing some doe-eyed hero it's cool but it's more fun to play baddies."

== Storylines ==
Sean Reynolds first arrived in Emmerdale on 10 March 1999 and is later joined by his wife Angie, and two children Marc and Ollie. Sean settled down with his family in Emmerdale, and set up his own haulage firm. However, he found himself in stiff competition with rival businessman Chris Tate, who, like Sean, owned a successful haulage firm. Sean's stubbornness not to let Chris gain the upper-hand often got in the way of his own business, and there were several confrontations between Sean and Chris. At one point, Angie suggested that Sean become business partners with Chris, but Sean abruptly brushed this idea off.

In 2000, Sean started an affair with Tara Thornfield. This was discovered in January 2001 by his son Marc who subsequently told Angie. Sean was apologetic and claimed the affair was over, nevertheless Angie threw him out of the family home. After being assaulted by Angie in the Woolpack, Tara then left Emmerdale. Sean moved in with Terry and Carlos at Annie's Cottage. Angie later gave Sean another chance but he then discovered that she had been sleeping with Cain Dingle who blamed Sean for the death of his half-brother Butch in a bus crash. When Sean discovers Cain has also been sleeping with Ollie, he beats Cain up in the street. Cain reports Sean to the police and he is arrested for assault. When Tara returns to the village, she and Sean become close again. After Marc is imprisoned for a hit-and-run accident in which his headmistress Barbara Strickland is killed, Sean decides to leave the village and gets a new job in Cheshire. After getting Chris to buy him out of the haulage firm, he drives out of the village and discovers Tara leaving the village on foot. He picks her up and they drive off together to Cheshire. Five years later, it is revealed that Sean and Tara have married.

== Reception ==
In August 2002, McGann was nominated for an Echo Entertainment Award for his portrayal of Sean. Billy Sloan of the Sunday Mail said McGann's character "achieved notoriety when he had a steamy, marriage-wrecking affair with upper-crust Lady Tara Thornfield". The Daily Mirror's Sally Morgan branded Sean a "love-cheat husband with a selfish streak who cared little for his own kids." While Tim Randall of the Daily Record called him a "love rat".
