= Peter Martin (actor) =

English actor (1941–2023)

- Born: c. December 1941; Gainsborough, Lincolnshire, England
- Died: 19 April 2023 (aged 81)
- Occupation: Actor
- Years active: 1967–2023

Peter Martin (c. December 1941 – 19 April 2023) was an English actor. He played Joe Carroll in The Royle Family (1998–2012) and Len Reynolds in Emmerdale (2001–2007). As well as this, he appeared in many other productions on both screen and stage.

== Early life ==
Peter Martin was born in Gainsborough, Lincolnshire, in December 1941. His family were originally from Hull, but were in Gainsborough at the time due to the heavy bombing of Hull by Nazi Germany during the Hull Blitz.

== Career ==
Martin became known in the 1980s for his appearances in TV ads for the Jewson hardware chain. His acting works include playing the fish shop man in First of the Summer Wine. He also played 'Charlie the moonlighting gravedigger' in the Beiderbecke Tapes. He was in The Royle Family as Joe Carroll. He also starred in the film Brassed Off, the television series All Creatures Great and Small, Chucklevision, Coronation Street, Playing the Field, Victoria Wood and Last of the Summer Wine.

In 2001, Martin began playing Len Reynolds in the ITV soap opera Emmerdale. In May 2007, it was announced that Martin's character Len, would be killed off, as Martin had accepted the role of Captain Mainwaring in a stage production of Dad's Army. In 2018, Martin had a role in the comedy film Walk like a Panther.

== Personal life and death ==
Martin died on 19 April 2023, at the age of 81.

== Filmography ==
=== Film ===
Year	Title	Role	Notes
1967	Pretty Polly	Sailor	
1979	The Brontë Sisters	Minor role	
1985	Wetherby	Helpful Parent	
1989	Ladder of Swords	Policeman	
1995	Funny Bones	Skipper	
1996	Brassed Off	Ernie	
2001	The Parole Officer	Tom	
2018	Walk Like a Panther	Harry	
