= Linda Fowler =

Fictional character from Emmerdale

- Emmerdale character
- Portrayed by: Tonicha Jeronimo
- Duration: 1994–1997
- First appearance: 4 August 1994
- Last appearance: 21 October 1997
- Created by: Mervyn Watson
- Introduced by: Mervyn Watson
- Spin-off appearances: Revenge (1998) (Flashback)
In-universe information
- Other names: Linda Glover
- Occupation: Veterinarian receptionist
- Father: Ned Glover
- Mother: Jan Glover
- Brothers: Dave Glover; Roy Glover
- Husband: Biff Fowler (1996–1997)
- Aunts: June Worrel

Linda Fowler (also Glover) is a fictional character from the British ITV soap opera Emmerdale, played by Tonicha Jeronimo from 1994 to 1997. It was reported on 6 May 1997 that Jeronimo had quit the soap after three years. The character was killed off in a car crash in October 1997, as part of the show's 25th anniversary celebrations.

== Casting ==
Jeronimo was 16 years old when she was offered the role of Linda. She had been taking her GCSE exams when she attended the audition for the serial. She explained "It was like something out of Hollywood. I passed the audition and by the Monday I was working on the show. It was like falling in love, a whirlwind romance, a dream."

In an interview with Dave Jones, published in the North Wales Weekly News, Jeronimo described Linda in her early scenes as "quite a flighty, fun character". However, "her world fell apart" following an abortion, her brother's death, and a miscarriage. The actress admitted that the role become "too exhausting" as she spent a lot of time crying.

In May 1997, Jeronimo announced that she was leaving Emmerdale because of the "grinding despair" working on series made her feel. Jeronimo did not agree with the way her character was written out, and this made the actress realise that she made the right decision. Jeronimo told a columnist from the Daily Mirror that she believed producers killed her character as a punishment for quitting Emmerdale.

== Storylines ==
Linda arrives in Emmerdale with her family. She finds employment at the local veterinary practice as a receptionist, despite her father Ned's (Johnny Leeze) objections when he learns that Zoe Tate (Leah Bracknell) is a lesbian. Linda has a relationship with Danny Weir (Matthew Marsden) and she becomes pregnant. She uses drugs from the vets to induce a miscarriage, but is hospitalised in a critical condition. She makes a full recovery, but loses the baby. Linda finds love with Biff Fowler (Stuart Wade) and they marry on the same day her brother Dave Glover (Ian Kelsey) is killed in a fire, while trying to save James Tate.

Linda is shocked to find a newborn baby girl in a box outside the veterinary surgery. Two days later, after being admitted to hospital for haemorrhaging, 13-year-old Emma Cairns (Rebecca Loudensack) admits to being the mother. Linda becomes broody. Shortly after Biff's father, Ron Hudson (Richard Albrecht), dies of Huntington's disease, Linda tells Biff that she could be pregnant and he admits that his father's disease could be hereditary. Biff's tests for Huntington's disease come back negative. However, Linda miscarries.

On 16 October 1997, Linda and other guests are invited to the engagement party of Kim Tate (Claire King) and her fiancé Steve Marchant (Paul Opacic). In the build-up to the party, Linda is excited about the events at Home Farm and buys an expensive dress. Biff makes it clear that he would rather go to the Woolpackers event at the wine bar, and is horrified to learn how much Linda's dress cost. They couple argue. Linda later arrives at the party, squashed in her mini, with the rest of her family. Biff complains to Steve that he is blocking the parking with his Porsche. He gives Linda the keys so she can move it. Biff is jealous when Linda waves at Lord Alex Oakwell (Rupam Maxwell) as they had lunch that day, and he is still bitter towards Kim. Linda dances and drinks alcohol.

Alex asks Linda to dance and a jealous Biff later barges through them. Alex suggests that they go outside and Kim watches them disappear. Linda then suggests that they go for a drive in Steve's Porsche, because she has still got the keys. Alex agrees to drive and Kim sees them leave. Kim tells Biff that Linda has gone off with Alex and Biff rushes after them. Alex pulls the car over and snorts cocaine in front of Linda, before resuming driving. He starts to touch Linda, but she tells him to stop. They fight and Alex crashes the car into a tree. Seeing that Linda is badly injured, Alex moves her into the driver's seat, kisses her and runs off, leaving Linda to die. Biff finds the car and tries to wake Linda. Linda's former sister-in-law Kathy (Malandra Burrows) and Doug Hamilton stop to help; Doug phones for an ambulance using his mobile phone. Alex sneaks back to Home Farm, where the party is still going on and claims that he left Linda in a layby and that she drove off at speed.

Linda is brought to the hospital and taken straight to the resuscitation room. Biff arrives moments later and is told that he cannot see Linda; the doctor asks about Linda's parents. Kathy and Doug try to comfort Biff as he feels bad about the argument he and Linda had. Biff is told that Linda has died from uncontrollable internal bleeding caused by a fractured pelvis and a ruptured spleen. Biff cries as he looks at Linda's body. He kisses her and tells her that he will always love her.

== Reception ==
Critic Dave Jones branded Linda "a tragic character".

In May 2020, ITV3 repeated the 1996 episode where Linda and Biff tell Betty Eagleton (Paula Tilbrook) and Seth Armstrong (Stan Richards) about their engagement.
