= Anthony Lewis (actor) =

English actor (born 1983)

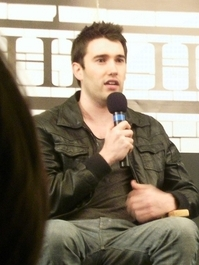
- Lewis in 2010
- Born: 31 March 1983 (age 43); Leeds, West Yorkshire, England
- Years active: 1993–2023
- Spouse: Samantha Lewis (m. 2019)
- Children: 1
- Relatives: Matthew Lewis (brother)

Anthony Lewis (born 31 March 1983) is an English actor.

== Career ==
Lewis began acting at 9 years old, with roles in television series including Heartbeat, A Touch of Frost and Cracker, as well as in the film Girls' Night. Regular roles in Children's Ward (as Scott Morris for three series) and Adam's Family Tree (as Adam for two series) followed, as well as the lead in the show My Dad's a Boring Nerd. He went on to appear in the ITV soap opera Emmerdale, where he portrayed the role of Marc Reynolds for three years, making a three episode guest return five years after his initial departure.

After leaving Emmerdale, Lewis performed in Broken Voices at the Tristan Bates Theatre in London. Other work includes appearances in the television series Dalziel and Pascoe and Respectable, and the film Boy A, and a starring role in the science-fiction series show Torchwood as the young World War I soldier Tommy Brockless. He also performed across the UK as Lomper in the 2016/2017 UK Tour of The Full Monty.

Outside of acting, Lewis also provides continuity announcements for BBC One and BBC Two.

== Personal life ==
He has two brothers, Chris Lewis and actor Matthew Lewis. Anthony attended St. Mary's Menston.

In 2019, Lewis married his wife Samantha with whom he has a son River Lewis (b. 2018).

== Filmography ==
=== Film ===
Year	Title	Role	Notes
1997	My Dad's a Boring Nerd	Kevin	Television film
1998	Girls' Night	Mathew Wilkinson	
2007	Boy A	Steve	
2009	Everything But The Ball	George Junior	Television film
2011	Frankenstein's Wedding	Policeman	Television film
2013	Make It Plumb	Paul Alcock	Television film
2014	La Nuit		Short film
2018	Wasteland	Josh	
2020	On My Own	Colin	Short film

=== Television ===
Year	Title	Role	Notes
1994	Heartbeat	Billy Swinton	Episode: "Arms and the Man"
1995	Cracker	Steven Nash	Episode: "Best Boys"
1996	A Touch of Frost	Barnabas Meyerbridge	Episode: "The Things We Do for Love"
1996	The Detectives	First Boy	Episode: "The Great Escaper"
1996	Cardiac Arrest	Christopher Nixon	Episode: "The Age of Consent"
1996–1999	Children's Ward	Scott Morris	Recurring role; 8 episodes
1997–1998	Adam's Family Tree	Adam	Series regular; 13 episodes
1999–2007	Emmerdale	Marc Reynolds	Series regular; 214 episodes
2004	Doctors	Tom	Episode: "Hidden Harm"
2004	Holby City	Brendan Fletcher	Episode: "Inside Out"
2004	Dalziel and Pascoe	Gavin Oldham	Episode: "The Price of Fame"
2005	Girls in Love	Crush Boy	Episode: "The Crush"
2006	Respectable	Stuart	Episode: "Episode 3"
2008	Torchwood	Tommy Brockless	Episode: "To the Last Man"
2010	A Passionate Woman	Micky	Miniseries; 1 episode
2011	Doctors	Rick Williams	Episode: "Running on Empty"
2011	Holby City	Scott Quinn	Episode: "Culture Shock"
2012	The Syndicate	Peter Davies	Recurring role; 2 episodes
2018	Ackley Bridge	Tony Potts	Recurring role; 2 episodes
2023	Doctors	Paul Townsend	Episode: "Say Sorry"
2023	Better	DS Ibbotson	Recurring role; 5 episodes

== See also ==
- List of Emmerdale characters
