= Nicky Evans =

English actor

- Born: 20 April 1979 (age 47); Bradford, West Yorkshire, England
- Occupation: Actor
- Years active: 1992–present

Nicholas Evans (born 20 April 1979) is an English actor who is best known for playing the roles of Roy Glover on the ITV soap opera Emmerdale from 1994 to 2000 and Shane Maguire on Channel 4's hit comedy drama Shameless from 2006 to 2013.

== Early life ==
Evans was born in Bradford. His father worked as a disc jockey at local clubs, something Evans also did after leaving school. Evans studied part time at a music college.

== Career ==
Evans started acting at the age of six, when his mother saw in a newspaper that children were needed for catalogue work. Through this advert, Evans got an agent and three months later appeared in an advert for Steak Express. He appeared in more adverts as an child, before landing roles on television as a teenager. His first television role was in an episode of Stay Lucky in 1991. He also appeared in an episode of Heartbeat in 1992.

In 1994, Evans landed his first major role as Roy Glover in Emmerdale. First introduced in August 1994, Glover was the youngest child in the family. Because of a storyline involving Glover cutting off two of his fingers (which were successfully reattached), Evans had to wear a splint for six months of filming, and found it difficult filming with it on, later saying: "It is certainly one of the most dramatic moments I've been involved in on Emmerdale and I was really pleased with the way the scene looks", and also described filming the actual scene as "difficult " as they had to reshoot the scene multiple times to get "the horror over without being too sickening." Evans appeared in 488 episodes of Emmerdale over the course of six years, before he chose to leave the Soap in 2000.

After leaving Emmerdale, Evans appeared in several popular shows as a one-off, including Doctors, Holby City, The Royal, and The Bill.

From 2006 to 2013, Evans portrayed Shane Maguire in the comedy drama series Shameless. He first appeared in its third series as a one-off, but then starting from the shows fourth series became a more prominent character, especially in later series' when the shows focus shifted from the Gallagher family to the Maguires.

In 2015, Evans completed the role of Dragon in the 2016 British crime thriller The Contract.

Evans has appeared in horror films directed by Dominic Brunt, including Before Dawn (2013), Attack of the Adult Babies (2017), Evie (2021), and Wolf Manor (2022).

Evans is also a musician. He had a recording studio in his house as a young adult, and can play guitar and keyboard. While at college, Evans spent two years producing his own concept album, but after the hard drive failed and lost all the files, he sold his studio gear to another musician.

== Personal life ==
Just before he was hired to join Shameless, Evans moved to Cameroon and volunteered rehabilitating chimpanzees, but came back to England after he contracted Malaria.

As of 2021, Evans was living in London.

== Filmography ==
=== Television ===
| Year | Title | Role | Notes |
|---|---|---|---|
| 1991 | Stay Lucky | Scout | one episode |
| 1992 | Heartbeat | Graham Thompson | one episode |
| 1993 | Harry | Biker 2 | one episode |
| 1994 | Screen Two | Toddy | one episode |
| 1994–2000 | Emmerdale | Roy Glover | four hundred and eighty-eight episodes |
| 2000 | Doctors | Tom | one episode |
| 2001 | Clocking Off | Alex Aindow | one episode |
| 2001 | Bob & Rose | Gino Barker | |
| 2001 | Holby City | Tanner | one episode |
| 2002 | Sparkhouse | Connor | two episodes |
| 2003 | The Afternoon Play | Jonny Potter | one episode |
| 2003 | Burn It | Kieron | one episode |
| 2004 | The Royal | Eddie Spears | one episode |
| 2004 | Outlaws | Dooey | one episode |
| 2005 | The Bill | Andrew Bishop | one episode |
| 2006–2013 | Shameless | Shane Maguire | one hundred and fourteen episodes |
| 2014 | Casualty | Mike March | one episode |

=== Film ===
| Year | Title | Role | Notes |
|---|---|---|---|
| 1998 | Emmerdale: Revenge | Roy Glover | video release |
| 2004 | Millions | Scruffy young man | uncredited |
| 2006 | To the See Again | Scruff | short film |
| 2013 | Before Dawn | Stephen | |
| 2016 | The Contract | Dragon | |
| 2016 | Bucking Hell | Nada | short film |
| 2017 | Attack of the Adult Babies | Vlad | |
| 2018 | Nightshooters | Oddbod | |
| 2021 | Evie | Jacob Eli | |
| 2022 | Wolf Manor | Sam | |
| 2024 | I Bring Joy | Pap guy | |
