= Tonicha Jeronimo =

British actress (born 1977)

- Born: Tonicha Elizabeth Jeronimo; 4 November 1977 (age 48); Jersey
- Other names: TJ (acronym of Tonicha Jeronimo); Tonicha Dodds; Tonicha Dobbs (most likely a misspelling of Dodds); Tonicha Lawrence; Tonicha Dobre
- Occupations: Actress; Acting agent Acting school founder, director and principal Author
- Years active: 1994–present
- Known for: Emmerdale
- Spouses: Stuart Wade (m. 2000; div. 2007) Andrei Dobre (m. 2020)
- Children: 3

Tonicha Dobre (née Jeronimo; born 4 November 1977) is a British actress, born in Jersey, of partial Portuguese extraction. She is best known for her role as Linda Fowler in Emmerdale between 1994 and 1997, when her character was killed off.

== Early life and education ==
Jeronimo has a Portuguese father, Antonio; her mother is Susan, and she has an older sister, Filipa; her eldest sister is Lisa.

Jeronimo and her family left Jersey when she was 11 years old, living for a short time in Portugal, before moving to Yorkshire permanently.

Jeronimo attended the Carousel School of Dancing (renamed to Studio 16 in 2016) in Jersey, from the age of two years old. She was one of the youngest actors ever to be offered a place at the London Studio Centre; however, she had to turn the offer down, after instead taking her first TV acting role in Emmerdale at the age of 16 years old.

== Career ==
After leaving Emmerdale, Jeronimo joined the Hull Truck Theatre company, where she worked regularly with the playwright John Godber, who was also the director of the theatre.

From December 1997 to January 1998, Jeronimo starred in the pantomime Cinderella at the Sunderland Empire Theatre.

From February to April 1998, Jeronimo toured Beauty and the Beast, at the Swansea Grand Theatre in Swansea, the Pavilion Theatre in Rhyl, the Hull New Theatre, the Forum Theatre in Billingham, and the Manchester Opera House.

From April to June 2000, she starred in John Godber's production of Seasons in the Sun at the Hull Truck Theatre, and the West Yorkshire Playhouse in Leeds.

From December 2000 to January 2001, Jeronimo and her then-husband Stuart Wade, appeared in Simon Barry's pantomime version of Cinderella at the Grand Opera House, York. She played the title role, while husband Stuart played the role of Buttons.

From May to June 2001, she starred in Alice Bartlett's stage adaption of Little Malcolm and his Struggles Against the Eunuchs, again with Wade, at the Hull Truck Theatre, and the Theatre Royal, Wakefield.

In May 2001, Jeronimo starred in Kate Bramley's production of Doctor Faustus, again with Wade, at the Hull Truck Theatre.

From December 2001 to January 2002, she starred in Cinderella for a third time, this time with her sister Filipa Jeronimo (now known as Pippa Adams), as well as Wade, at the Tameside Hippodrome in Ashton-under-Lyne.

From December 2003 to January 2004, she and Wade starred in the pantomime of Jack and the Beanstalk at the Grand Opera House in York. Jeronimo played the role of Fairy Peapod, while Wade played the role of Simple Simon.

Jeronimo and Wade owned a hairdressing business, and Wade owned a property developing business. After Jack and the Beanstalk ended, they both decided to leave acting for a while to focus on their growing family. Jeronimo also worked for West Yorkshire Police for eight years, between 2001 and 2009.

In September 2008, Jeronimo founded the acting school Tonicha Lawrence Academy (abbreviated to the TLA), which is based at Gateways School in Harewood, West Yorkshire. She also founded the acting agency TLA Boutique Management at the same time. TLA Boutique Management originally offered representation to children and adults in the industry, by getting them auditions, before focusing solely on representing children. In 2020 TLA Boutique Management separated from the acting school, and was renamed Wrap Management. Wrap Management represents experienced children and adults from Northern England.

In January 2014, Jeronimo published a book titled The Business in Show.

In May 2016, Jeronimo joined the cast of the BBC medical drama Casualty, playing the role of Steph Sims in three episodes between May and August that year. She played the mother of Carmel Sims, played by Jeronimo's daughter Sydney Wade. Jeronimo reprised her role as Steph Sims again in an August 2016 episode of Holby City, and a February 2017 episode of Casualty.

== Personal life ==
In August 2000, Jeronimo married Stuart Wade (born 1 August 1969, Halifax, West Yorkshire) who played her on-screen husband Biff Fowler in Emmerdale, in Jersey. Jeronimo has three children: a daughter named Sydney Wade, a daughter named Ava Dodds, and a son named Lorcan Alexander Dodds (commonly known as Lorcan Alexander). Her daughter Sydney is also an actress.

All three children have had roles at the TLA Leeds: Sydney is a LAMDA teacher and screen teaching assistant currently at the school; Ava is a current school ambassador for dance; and Lorcan is the former head of dance at the school.

In 2017, she moved back to Jersey, to work with her sister Pippa Adams, who runs a youth acting company called Drama Lab. In 2018, she opened up a bar and restaurant called Ruby's Lounge and Bistro in Saint Helier. Her actress daughter Sydney works in the kitchen of Ruby's as a cook.

In January 2020, she married Andrei Dobre, a Romanian, with whom she has one child.

== Filmography ==
=== Television ===
Year	Title	Role	Notes
1994–1997	Emmerdale	Linda Glover	Series regular 284 episodes
1999	My Wonderful life	Jane	1 episode: Climbing Trees
2000	Where The Heart Is	Librarian	1 episode: "Legacy"
2016	Holby City	Stephanie Sims (credited as Tonicha Lawrence)	1 episode
2016–2017	Casualty	Steph Sims (credited as Tonicha Lawrence)	recurring 4 episodes
