= Anna Brecon =

English actress

- Born: Anna Juliet Davis; 1971 (age 54–55); Salisbury, Wiltshire, England
- Occupation: Actress
- Years active: 1996–present
- Spouse: Stephen Beckett

Anna Brecon (born 1971), or Anna Juliet Davis, is an English actress, best known for portraying Tara Reynolds ('Lady Tara') in the ITV soap opera Emmerdale.

== Early life ==
Born in Salisbury, Brecon attended South Wilts Grammar School for Girls in Salisbury. While at school, she was a contestant on the teen quiz show Blockbusters and did three "Gold runs". She went on to train at the Academy of Live and Recorded Arts.

== Career ==
Brecon played the part of Tara in Emmerdale between 1997 and 2002, with a year away from the show in 1999. She returned briefly to the role on 28 May 2007. Her other television work includes Canary Wharf, Crime Traveller, The Bill and Doctors. Brecon has also appeared in two advertising campaigns for Ferrero Rocher.

On 17 October 2000, while on her way from London to the Yorkshire Television Studios in Leeds, Brecon was a victim of the Hatfield rail disaster, suffering a minor injury, cuts and bruises.

Her film credits include Bring Me the Head of Mavis Davis (1997), FairyTale: A True Story (1997), Only Darkness (1999), and Mixed Up and the horror film Exposé (both 2009).

Brecon's theatre work includes Sugar Daddies, the title role in Miss Julie (2002), The Children's Hour, Between the Gods and the Gutter and Woman in Mind.

== Personal life ==
In February 2000, Brecon met the actor Stephen Beckett, in the rehearsals for a production of The Blue Room at the Octagon Theatre, Bolton, in which they had both been cast. They soon became a couple, going on holiday together to Italy. They were engaged to be married in January 2003 and have a daughter, Nancy, born in 2005, and a son, Wilfred, born in 2006. In 2018 they were living in Brighton.

== Awards ==
Brecon won the Most Popular Newcomer Award at the 1998 National Television Awards, and Best Soap Newcomer at the TV Quick Awards in the same year. At the 2000 Manchester Evening News Theatre Awards, she was the Best Actress winner for her performance in The Blue Room.

== Filmography ==
=== Television ===
Year	Show	Role	Notes
1996	Canary Wharf	Claudia	Soap opera
1997	Crime Traveller	Journalist: Fashion Shoot (1997)	TV series
1997	The Bill	Sharon McCarthy: Tommy the Hero (1997)	TV series
1997	The Investigator	Warley	Television film
1997	Emmerdale	Lady Tara Thornfield (1997–1998, 2000–2002, 2007)	TV series
2009	Doctors	Melissa Saywell: First Love Last Love (2009)	Soap opera
2018	Doctors	Zara's confidante on Surrogacy	Soap opera

=== Film ===
Year	Show	Role	Notes
1997	Bring Me the Head of Mavis Davis	Reporter	Feature film
1997	FairyTale: A True Story	Fairy	Feature film
1999	Only Darkness		Feature film
2009	Mixed Up	Alice	Feature film
2009	Exposé (aka Stalker)	Paula Martin	Feature film
