= Belle Dingle =

Fictional character from Emmerdale

- Emmerdale character
- Eden Taylor-Draper as Belle Dingle (2020)
- Portrayed by: James Mather (1998–2000); Emily Mather (1998–2005); Eden Taylor-Draper (2005–present)
- Duration: 1998–present
- First appearance: Episode 2463; 25 December 1998
- Introduced by: Keith Richardson
- Spin-off appearances: Emmerdale: The Dingles – For Richer for Poorer (2010)
In-universe information
- Other names: Tinkerbelle Lisa Dingle; Belle King
- Occupation: Personal assistant; Ambassador; Businesswoman; Receptionist
- Father: Zak Dingle
- Mother: Lisa Dingle
- Stepmother: Joanie Dingle
- Half-brothers: Nathan Dingle; Butch Dingle; Ben Dingle; Cain Dingle; Sam Dingle
- Half-sisters: Tina Dingle
- Husband: Thomas King (2024–2025)
- Uncles: Shadrach Dingle; Albert Dingle; Caleb Dingle; Ezra Dingle
- Nephews: Nate Robinson; Vinny Dingle; Samson Dingle; Kyle Dingle; Isaac Dingle
- Nieces: Debbie Dingle
- First cousins: Mandy Dingle; Marlon Dingle; Chas Dingle; Gennie Walker; Eli Dingle
- Other relatives: Charity Dingle; Sarah Sugden; Jack Sugden; Aaron Dingle; Noah Dingle; Leyla Sugden

Belle Dingle (also King) is a fictional character from the British ITV soap opera Emmerdale, played by Eden Taylor-Draper. Belle made her first screen appearance during the episode broadcast on 25 December 1998, originally played by twins Emily and James Mather. James stopped appearing in the role in 2000 and Emily in 2005, at which point Taylor-Draper took over, remaining ever since. Belle has featured in various storylines throughout her time on the soap, such as falling down a mineshaft, killing her best friend Gemma Andrews (Tendai Rinomhota), having an affair with doctor Jermaine Bailey (Micah Balfour), faking a pregnancy to prevent Jermaine from leaving after their affair is revealed, being diagnosed with schizophrenia, a relationship with Lachlan White (Thomas Atkinson) which ends after discovering he is a serial killer and various mental health relapses. In 2024, Belle was at the centre of a high-profile storyline which sees her being coercively controlled and abused by husband Thomas King (James Chase).

== Casting and characterisation ==
Twins Emily and James Mather were cast as Belle after their mother, Joanne, was told the soap's producers were looking for babies to play a role in the show. She explained "My two had just been born so I contacted casting. When they saw Emily and James they liked them straight away and they made their first appearance when they were only 10 days old." The twins were brought in when the producers realised that the role would be too demanding for one child to play. Emily and James took it in turns to play Belle. Their mother was on-set all the time and chose which twin appeared on-screen. As Belle grew older and her storylines increased, the new actress was sought for the part. After a series of auditions, Eden Taylor-Draper was cast as Belle and she began appearing on-screen in 2005.

Her character profile on the official Emmerdale website notes that despite her age, Belle is the "brightest" in the Dingle family, but although she is smart, she is still a "Dingle at heart". It states that she is a "proud and loyal member" of the Dingles, and that she "will use her intelligence for scams". She is billed as an "intelligent, intuitive, caring, normal teenager who likes to test the boundaries with her mum and dad". The profile notes that she likes boys and makeup, and that she dislikes "being treated like a kid", and that if she had a wish, it would be for a "fit boyfriend and less hassle from her parents".

== Development ==
=== Murder of Gemma Andrews ===
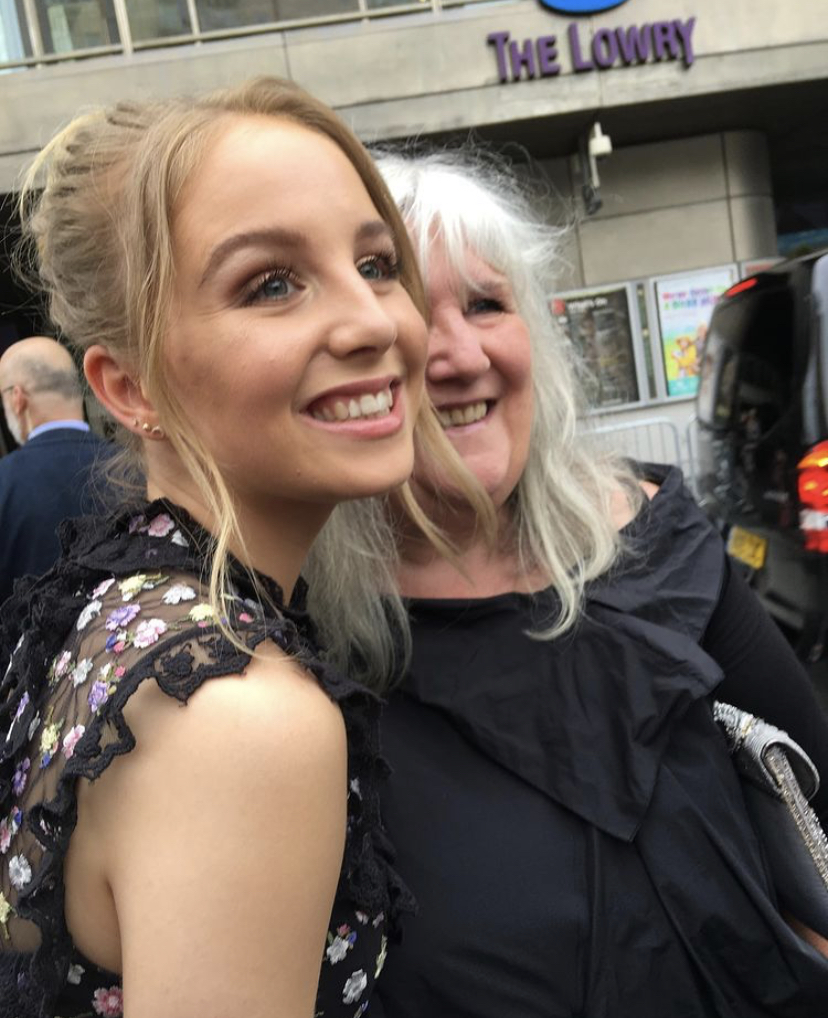
Eden Taylor-Draper (left) with Jane Cox (right), who plays her on-screen mother Lisa.

It was revealed on 23 January 2014 that Belle would have a life-changing storyline later in the year which would see her unintentionally kill her best friend, Gemma Andrews (Tendai Rinomhota) after an argument gets out of hand. In March 2014, the character confessed and was charged with murder. In June 2014, the character was charged with manslaughter and later sentenced to 3 years imprisonment. This sentence was later reduced to 1 year in August 2014. Speaking about the build-up to the moment, Taylor-Draper explained that the situation gets "a bit heated" due to the pair both liking Sean. She noted that there has always been a rivalry between the two, and this drives that rivalry further. The argument starts when Belle and Sean flirt, and Gemma "kicks off a little bit". She explains that the characters are "by a river out in the sticks with nobody else around", and Belle pushes Gemma "hard enough to cause some damage". She defends her character, stating that Belle does not do it to hurt Gemma, and that it "wasn't deliberate at all". Gemma gets up from the fall, so Belle assumes she is "perfectly fine", but later hears that Gemma has gone missing. Taylor-Draper explains that Belle begins to think "is this because of me?", but it "doesn't really hit home" until they find Gemma unconscious. Then, Belle "realises that she is to blame and she feels really guilty". After Gemma dies in hospital, Belle "breaks down and blurts the truth out to Lisa". The actress explains that her character wants to go to the police, but that Lisa "wants to protect her family" and does not want to see Belle go to prison. Belle becomes "very paranoid that everyone has got their eyes on her", and Taylor-Draper states that the experience has "traumatised" Belle. Belle "feels that she is a murderer" and that she deserves a prison sentence "as she doesn't want this huge weight on her shoulders". Taylor-Draper added that she could not personally live with it in real life, and that hinted that the event "could absolutely ruin [Belle's] life and it's already eating away at her". She also voiced her excitement at being involved in the storyline, noting that it is the "biggest story" she has had in her time on Emmerdale so far.

Belle is sentenced to three years of imprisonment once her manslaughter is discovered. She is released months later, with her break being due to the actress taking examinations. Taylor-Draper stated that Belle is initially "alright" following her release, and that her warm welcome from the Dingles makes her feel like "the normal old-school Belle" who is "happy to be home". She notes that viewers will initially "think that everything is great and there's nothing wrong", but revealed that Belle is "damaged". She explains that "cracks start to show in this false appearance of Belle having a lovely life", and that "there are little things that build up as time goes on". Belle is "feeling fine" about returning to school, but when Gabby Thomas (Annelise Manojlovic) and her friends circle Belle and bully her, it "really messes with [her] head". She visits Gemma's shrine, where she meets Lachlan, who asks if she knew Gemma prior to her death. Taylor-Draper explains that "she finds it really hard to deal with him, because she feels that he's very full-on with death". Due to wanting to change her appearance following prison, Belle dyes her hair a dark brown. Lisa is supportive of the change, but is "very anxious" about Belle's mental state, to which Taylor-Draper responded by saying: "I don't think Belle is registering anyone's worry at this point. Even if she does, she's just saying that everything is fine."

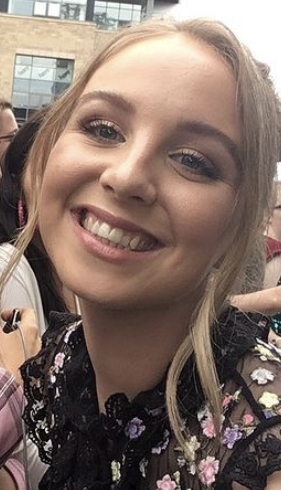
Taylor-Draper stated that she felt "honoured" to be given an issue-led storyline.

Belle decides she does not want to go to school, and her parents source a home tutor for her, and Belle "thinks that's great because she won't have to deal with people". Marlon Dingle (Mark Charnock) asks Belle to look after his daughter April Windsor (Amelia Flanagan), which Taylor-Draper notes is a "massive step for Belle" since it means that people are trusting her with responsibilities. However, after he sees Belle arguing with Gabby, he decides "he no longer wants her near his child", which is "really hard for Belle to deal with". The actress notes that although Gabby initiates the rivalry between them, Belle "becomes awful to Gabby". Someone is believed to be targeting Belle, putting abusive graffiti on her front door, smashing the windows at her home, and attacking her. After Belle believes she can communicate with Gemma and begins to follow her "instructions", producers confirmed that these events would form "an ongoing mental health storyline for Belle", who is experiencing trauma after Gemma's death and her experiences in prison. Emmerdale producers consulted with the Tees, Esk and Wear Valleys NHS Foundation Trust for the storyline, who stated that they were happy to lend support to the soap as it has "a great platform for raising awareness of serious mental illnesses like psychosis". She has an outburst, where she reveals that she is responsible for all of the targeted attacks, rather than Lachlan, who people believe to be the culprit. Taylor-Draper explained: "Gemma is tormenting her, bullying her but from within her own mind. It's not like she sees Gemma as a ghost, but Gemma is surrounding her. Belle is doing things because she is being told to. Everyone thinks she is being bullied and then attacked by Lachlan but it's not, it's her. It's coming from Gemma". The actress felt "honoured" to be given an issue-led storyline, and stated that she knew it would be "challenging" prior to beginning the story. She spoke to someone who had a "quite similar" story to Belle, in order to portray the mental illness correctly. The storyline progresses when Belle hears Gemma telling her that Edna Birch (Shirley Stelfox) has a problem with Belle, and encourages her to hurt her. Taylor-Draped stated that "Belle knows deep down" that Edna and Belle are fine, but she "feels obliged to attack Edna in some way – just to make Gemma calm down". The storyline reaches a "climax" in January 2015 when Belle bites Katie Sugden (Sammy Winward) and locks herself in a car, leading medical professionals to get involved. Katie later dies by falling through the floor in a farm, and despite having no involvement in her death, Belle blames herself. She attempts suicide, and is hospitalised.

=== Relationship with Jermaine Bailey and schizophrenia diagnosis ===
In March 2016, it was reported that Belle would fall for Jermaine, a local doctor. Taylor-Draper said of the storyline that Belle's relationship with Dr. Bailey "is an escape from [Belle's] life" and that her character had "fallen for this guy". Taylor-Draper also stated she regards the storyline as a coming of age storyline for Belle. Prior to the relationship beginning, Taylor-Draper and Balfour were taken in for a meeting with series producer Ian MacLeod for a "character conference", where he revealed plans for the two to be a romantic pairing. The two were not told where the storyline would advance to past the romance. Due to the age difference of the characters, Taylor-Draper stated that she found it "weird" to be kissing someone who is the age of her father, but stated that "it's work". The two meet when Belle cuts her hand at the sweet factory, and she lies about her age and position at the factory to Jermaine. He is "fooled by Belle's lies", and since there is "clearly an attraction between the pair", Belle becomes "confident" that they it will lead to more. However, Belle stops taking her medication for her mental illness, and voices begin "telling her what to do", with thoughts such as pouring wine over step-mother Joanie and pretend to be pregnant with Jermaine's baby. She calls the voices Ellie, who she perceives to be a friend from prison, but is "actually a symptom of her psychosis".

When her first scan is booked, she begins to panic, with Taylor-Draper adding that Jermaine's profession as a doctor worries Belle further. She takes a scan from Charity Dingle (Emma Atkins), and claims to Jermaine that it is hers. When asked why nobody has noticed the state of her condition, Taylor-Draper explained that Belle is good at hiding the symptoms of her illness, and that the Dingle family have "problems of their own", taking the attention from her problems. Jermaine's estranged wife Angie overhears Belle talking to her voices, and realises that she is lying about being pregnant; she exposes Belle's lie to Jermaine and her family. When she is exposed, the voices begin shouting at Belle, and she replies, despite people watching her. Taylor-Draper explains: "she goes to the cafe, has a breakdown and all of the family see her crying on the floor. They finally know exactly what's going on." Belle then runs away, and the actress notes that her character "loses herself", as she does not know "what to do or how she feels anymore". Taylor-Draper praised the soap for revisiting Belle's mental health struggles, as she felt that it would be inconsiderate to portray psychosis as a "one-off thing" when people "deal with it for life". She noted that Belle's relapse is "a lot more serious" than her first episode, since she is in love, which she opined "made it 100 times worse". Asked if Jermaine and Belle could reconcile their relationship, Taylor-Draper explained that they still love each other and that Jermaine wants to help her to recover, but pondered whether Belle is "mentally stable" enough for a relationship. Taylor-Draper was then photographed filming "emotional new scenes" on-location, which depicted a "tired and in turmoil" homeless Belle "sleeping rough" on the street. She is found by a police officer who takes her home, but the experience worsens her symptoms, and the voices in her head begin telling her that Lisa is evil. Lisa takes her to the doctor, and she is finally diagnosed with schizophrenia.

=== Relationship with Lachlan White ===
In mid-2017, it was confirmed that Belle and Lachlan's friendship would be developed into a romantic relationship. Taylor-Draper states that despite Lachlan being a "weirdo", Belle considers herself one too, and that the "connection between them" is fuelled by being "very different and isolated from the rest of the village". Following his release from prison, Belle notices that he has been working out and "something new was sparked in her", with the actress stating that Belle is attracted to Lachlan. She recalls back to a storyline where Lachlan stalks Belle, noting that he likes her too. She also explains that Belle finds herself competing with Sookie (Olivia Atkinson), a friend of Lachlan's that he uses to make Belle jealous. She sees Sookie as "prettier and cleverer than her", and does not realise that Lachlan is using her for his own advantage. Taylor-Draper admits that Belle is in "dangerous territory" by becoming involved with Lachlan, but Belle finds it "quite exciting, an adrenalin rush", and wants to date somebody her own age after her experience with Jermaine. She hinted that there is "lots of drama and upheaval to come", including a "rocky time for Belle, with some real highs and some real lows", but she expressed her hope that Belle would come out of the situation safe. She added that she enjoys working with Atkinson, joking that he is completely "chilled" in contrast to his character. Belle learns that Lachlan is worrying about having sex with Belle since he is a virgin, but "she's completely fine with it and makes him feel less insecure". When Lachlan is responsible for the deaths of his mother and grandfather, he leaves a voicemail to his friend, Gerry Roberts (Shaun Thomas). Belle later discovers Gerry's phone, and it is hinted that she could be responsible for Lachlan's "downfall". She gives the phone back to Gerry, meaning that his actions are left a secret. Belle feels a potential relapse, and checks herself into mental health unit for help. While Belle is there, Lachlan murders Gerry and Terry (Daniel Casey), and Belle's half-brother Sam discovers Lachlan burying Terry's body. Lachlan attacks Sam, and when Belle is about to save Sam, Lachlan kidnaps her, and Digital Spy hinted that Belle could be his "final victim". Taylor-Draper describes her situation as "a mess", and that her character "has to play her cards right or she could be in danger". Belle acts calmly with Lachlan, and pretends to be pregnant with his child in order to protect herself. He later realises that she is lying, and she manages to escape after injuring him. She runs onto the road, where she is hit by Robert Sugden's (Ryan Hawley) car. Lachlan is imprisoned, and demands to know how Belle is. She visits him in prison, where she informs him that she "isn't afraid" of him, and "is going to take back control" of her life.

=== Failed vengeance scheme and relapse ===
In 2020, Jamie Tate (Alexander Lincoln) leaves Moira Dingle (Natalie J. Robb), the wife of Belle's half-brother, for dead after he hits her with his car. Belle initiates a romantic relationship with Jamie, who later confides in her that he is responsible for the hit and run. She informs Jamie that she plans to go to the police, but due to her "devotion" to him, she agrees to keep his secret. Jamie turns Belle against her family, and it was reported that Belle may potentially be a victim of Jamie's abuse, since his actions leave her "struggling" without her family. However, it was revealed that all of her actions were planned by Belle in order to avenge Moira when she betrays Jamie and reports him to the police. Taylor-Draper described filming the scenes as "so much fun", and joked that she "loved playing a game against the top game player himself". She explained that initially, Belle was attracted to Jamie, but "over time Belle obviously realised how awful Jamie can be", so with the assistance of nephew Nate Robinson (Jurell Carter), she "hatched a plan to get more information". The actress enjoyed "preserving the twist" due to storyline details often being leaked, which she felt ruins the shock element to certain scenes of the soap. She also hints that Jamie would not "go down easily", and that he "will have something up his sleeve" that Belle does not expect. She also explains that there is "a moment where Belle could admit" the plan, but "she sticks to her guns" despite panicking about the situation.

Jamie "cruelly" frames Belle for his crime, and she is questioned by the police. Belle informs the police that Andrea Tate (Anna Nightingale), Jamie's ex-wife, will back up her story. However, unknowingly to Belle, Jamie signs his daughter Millie (Willow Bell) to Andrea for an alibi. With only Belle in the frame for the crime, her mental health begins to worsen, and Jamie adds to her worries when he calls her threatening to "destroy" her. Emmerdale confirm that they will "revisit" her mental health, and Belle stops taking her medication, and later begins to hear voices again. The voices begin by telling her that Andrea s to blame for everything happening, causing Belle to inform Millie that her mother is evil. She then hears the voice of her mother Lisa, who died a year prior. She attempts digging into Lisa's grave to make the voices stop. Lisa tells Belle that Jamie will harm her and her family, and warns her to do something about it. She takes a knife and goes into the woods, where she hallucinates visions of Jamie following her. Taylor-Draper explains that Belle does not know "what she's going to do next" due to being in a "whirlwind". She "thinks getting rid of Jamie would protect her family", and due to her hallucinations, she finds it difficult to know which person is "the real Jamie". She opined that Jamie would not know that he is in danger, since he has never seen the extent of Belle's schizophrenia. She also expressed hope that her character would receive help, specifically from her family. She explained: "The reason Belle has spiralled is because everyone is so busy with their own lives and nobody has really seen it happening. If they can rally round and get her help, it could all be a lot better." She then hallucinates while speaking to Mackenzie Boyd (Lawrence Robb), believing he is Jamie. After this, she believes that Tracy Metcalfe (Amy Walsh), the pregnant partner of Nate, is Jamie, and approaches her with a knife. Belle cuts her hand gripping onto the knife, and when Tracy informs her, she realises that Tracy is not Jamie. She is then taken to hospital. Realising that Belle could not cope in prison due to her mental illness, Nate takes the blame for the hit and run, and faces a potential prison sentence. He faces a five-year prison sentence, but is not imprisoned.

=== Coercive control and abuse ===
In 2023, Emmerdale announced that Belle would be at the centre of a coercive control and abuse storyline, at the hands of husband Thomas King (James Chase). The story arc was long-running, lasting for over a year. Producer Laura Shaw wanted the storyline to be realistic in terms of its timeframe, explaining: "It's something that goes on for a long period of time and we wanted to be truthful to that. I think we've always had a good idea in our head of exactly where we wanted it to end. Obviously we've found new twists and turns as we've gone through, but we've always had a pretty clear picture in our head of how it would end." It saw Tom isolate Belle from her family, physically abuse her, spy on her through cameras, pretend that her dog had been killed and try to convince other villagers that Belle had stopped taking her mental health medication in efforts to make her seem insane.

The storyline saw Emmerdale alter its format for a special episode, in which different outcomes were shown depending on the choices Belle could make in regards to her relationship with Tom. The episode that saw Tom's prison sentencing in court also altered the typical format for Emmerdale. It featured various women recalling their experiences with abusive men and breaking the fourth wall by looking directly at the camera. Belle was also featured in the format change, with her looking directly to the viewers following Tom's sentencing.

== Storylines ==
Belle is born on Christmas Day 1998 to Zak (Steve Halliwell) and Lisa Dingle (Jane Cox). Lisa is unaware that she is pregnant until she goes into labour and local vet Paddy Kirk (Dominic Brunt) delivers Belle. When Belle is seven years old, she goes missing after she is left at home under the care of her uncle Shadrach Dingle (Andy Devine), who has fallen asleep. Daz Eden (Luke Tittensor) visits, bringing his pet ferret Spike. Although being warned not to, Belle lets the ferret out of his cage and in a panic, chases him through the fields. As she pursues him, she falls down a mine shaft. Daz is forced to leave the house, and when he finds her, dives in to help her out, but discovers that they are trapped, with the risk of freezing or drowning in the water. Daz manages to keep Belle afloat, until they are eventually rescued by the Dingles and the fire brigade. Belle acts as ring bearer at her cousin Marlon Dingle's (Mark Charnock) wedding to Donna Windsor (Verity Rushworth) and she briefly moves in with Marlon shortly after.

Belle befriends Will Wylde (Oscar Lloyd), and the pair grow closer, and Belle comforts him when he learns his father is found dead. Will has to leave the village and he gives Belle his Nintendo DS. Lisa encourages Belle to say goodbye, and she rushes up to the taxi, shouting that she loves him. Will shouts that he loves her too. Belle dates Luke Salter (Daniel Pearson), after meeting him at a party. They keep their relationship a secret, as he previously dated her friend Gemma Andrews (Tendai Rinomhota). When Gemma sees them together, she warns Belle that Luke is trouble. Her parents are also wary about the relationship, especially when Belle almost loses her virginity to him. Luke breaks up with Belle and she realises that he only wanted to have sex with her.

Belle befriends Sean Spencer (Luke Roskell) and dates his best friend Thomas King (Mark Flanagan) to make him jealous. Gemma gives Belle a makeover after Sean laughs at her, which impresses Thomas. Belle's parents find inappropriate pictures of her on her phone, with evidence that Thomas took them. Sean steals a bottle of alcohol in an attempt to impress her, but he sees her with Thomas and smashes it. Belle's relationship with Thomas causes her to neglect Gemma. After a fight, Gemma sends Sean a suggestive photo of Belle which she had taken earlier in an attempt to get Thomas to notice her. However, Sean defends Belle and asks her if Thomas is making her do stuff, leading to her to angrily announce she never fancied him. In response, he posts the picture online. Thomas attacks Sean in defence of Belle. Sean apologises and she forgives him. Belle finds Thomas about to run away in Dan Spencer's (Liam Fox) van, and she begs him to take her with him. Paddy believes that Thomas has kidnapped Belle, and tells her family. Thomas later brings her back to the village.

Sean asks Belle out and they make plans to have sex, but Dominic Andrews (Wil Johnson) interrupts them, claiming that Sean got Gemma pregnant. Belle abandons him and tells everyone at school that Gemma had an abortion, leading to a fight. Belle is suspended. She tells Debbie that she wanted to harm Gemma, which Dom overhears. During an altercation with Gemma, Belle pushes her to the ground and Gemma hits her head. Belle apologises and tries to help her, but Gemma tells her to stay away and they walk off in opposite directions. Harriet Finch (Katherine Dow Blyton) finds Gemma's body near a hedge and she dies in hospital. Belle tells Lisa that she killed Gemma, but Lisa forbids her from going to the police. Belle leaves Gemma's funeral to hand herself in and she is charged with Gemma's murder.

Zak locks Belle in a barn to give her a taste of what prison would be like, and refuses to give Lisa the key to let her out. Belle believes that if she gets pregnant by Sean, she will avoid going to prison, but they later drop the idea. Belle's brother, Sam Dingle (James Hooton), tries to run away with her to escape a prison sentence, but Dom tips off the police and Belle is remanded. During the trial, Belle is sentenced to three years in prison, but she is forgiven by Dom. Belle later wins an appeal and her sentence is reduced to one year. When Belle is released from prison, she finds it hard to adjust to normal life again. She dyes her hair dark and befriends Lachlan White (Thomas Atkinson). Belle is later discovered by Harriet and Ashley Thomas (John Middleton) in the church, crying and covered in blood. Belle refuses to tell Zak and Lisa who attacked her. Belle considers trying to kill herself with painkillers, but she fails and breaks down in tears. Belle trashes David Metcalfe's (Matthew Wolfenden) shop and Edna Birch's (Shirley Stelfox) house. It soon emerges Belle is having a mental health crisis, as she believes she can see and talk to Gemma. Lachlan offers Belle a legal high pill, which she takes and is relieved to discover that the voices in her head stop. Belle asks Lachlan for more of the pills, which he gives to her.

Belle is offered a job by Katie Sugden (Sammy Winward) on her new farm and Belle accepts. Belle's behaviour worsens and when Katie witnesses Belle talking to an imaginary Gemma, Belle fights Katie and bites her arm. Belle locks herself in Katie's car and attempts to run down Zak. Belle tells Zak and Lisa that she has been hearing Gemma's voice since leaving the young offender's institute and she is referred to a psychiatrist. Belle later discovers that Katie has died and she believes that she was responsible for her death. Belle tries to kill herself, but is saved by her half-brother Cain Dingle (Jeff Hordley). She is sectioned into a psychiatric unit until she recovers and returns home to her family.

Belle witnesses Zak kissing Joanie Wright (Denise Black) and she destroys Joanie's bedsit by flooding it. On Christmas Day, Belle throws insults at Zak and Joanie, revealing to the whole family that Zak and Joanie are having an affair. Belle tells Zak she is hearing voices to get her parents together again, but her plan fails. Lisa takes Belle out for driving lessons, after Belle refuses Zak offer to teach her. The family call a Dingle court, and the decision is made to excommunicate Zak from the household. Belle continues to support her mother as she adjusts to being a second-time divorcee, even encouraging her to make a fresh start with the family by her side. Belle cuts her hand on some glass and encounters Dr. Jermaine Bailey (Micah Balfour), who treats her hand. She is attracted to Jermaine, but soon learns he is married. Belle steals Joanie's engagement ring and insults her, leading Joanie to slap Belle. Jermaine and Belle meet at the factory to have sex, and they start a fire when a candle is knocked into a bin. Zak is arrested as Rishi Sharma (Bhasker Patel) accuses him of starting the fire, but Belle admits it was her and she is sacked. Jermaine is called to check up on Lisa after an angina attack and finds out Belle is only 17. Jermaine ends the relationship, but they soon get back together. Belle confesses all to Charity Dingle (Emma Atkins), who takes her to the doctor for emergency contraception. Cain finds out about Belle's relationship and Jermaine gets Belle to admit to stalking him, so they can continue their affair. His wife, Angie Bailey (Nina Toussaint-White), becomes suspicious and questions Belle, who admits to having an affair with Jermaine.

Jermaine is fired from the surgery and when he plans to leave, Belle claims she is pregnant. Charity becomes suspicious of Belle and she finds out Belle is lying to keep Jermaine. Belle and Charity form a plan to pretend Belle has had a miscarriage. Belle begins talking to a friend from prison, Ellie (Ashlie Robinson), but she is one of Belle's visual hallucinations. Belle convinces Charity she is actually pregnant. Belle is asked by Joanie to be bridesmaid at her wedding to Zak, to which she agrees. Ellie manipulates Belle into pouring red wine on Joanie's dress and Lisa covers for her. Belle shows Jermaine a scan photo, which she took from Charity. Angie overhears Belle talking to Ellie and exposes her lies in front of her family. Belle has a breakdown in the café and is taken home by her parents. When the paramedics arrive, the family discover Belle has gone. The family search for Belle, who is living rough and tormented by Ellie. Lisa is angry with Zak when he fails to answer a phone call from Belle and she leaves a voicemail. A body is found by the police, who Lisa and Zak identify, but it's not Belle. Belle's sleeping bag is taken by three men, and out of desperation tries to steal a piece of toast from a customer's plate in a cafe. The cafe owner later tries to feed Belle, but she runs away when he talks to a police officer and she ends up collapsing from malnutrition and dehydration. Belle is taken to hospital and Lisa and Zak are informed, but when they visit, Belle lashes out at Lisa, thinking she will kill her. Belle is assessed and Zak, Lisa and Jermaine are told Belle is hearing more than one voice and Jermaine thinks Belle has schizophrenia. Zak and Lisa are informed that they want to send Belle to a unit in Surrey. Belle returns over six weeks later to visit her family for the day.

== Reception ==
For her portrayal of Belle, Taylor-Draper earned the Spectacular Scene of the Year award at the 2006 British Soap Awards, alongside co-star Luke Tittensor for the storyline where Belle and Daz fell down a mineshaft. The following year, she won Best Young Actor at the Inside Soap Awards, as well as Best Young Performance at the British Soap Awards in the same year. Taylor-Draper then won the Best Child Performance at the British Soap Awards in 2013. She was longlisted for Best Actress at the 2024 Inside Soap Awards.

In 2014, Matt Bramford from What to Watch put Belle's 2005 recast on his list of the 18 best recastings in British and Australian soap operas, commenting, "The most trouble Belle Dingle got up to when played by Emily Mather was spilling baked beans down her bibs. It's Eden Taylor-Draper that has brought the character to life". Metro's Duncan Lindsay listed Belle's schizophrenia storyline in a list of top ten storylines that were devised by executive producer Kate Oates. He wrote that the storyline allowed the "talented" Taylor-Draper to "shine", and that "the scenes which unfolded were drama at its best". In December 2017, the character was shown with shorter hair and a fringe. Viewers of the soap took to social media to tweet about her new look, with OK! writing that her "stunning new hairstyle" and "statement fringe" had stunned viewers.
