= Jason Merrells =

English actor

- Born: Jason Scott Merrells; Epping, Essex, England
- Occupation: Actor
- Years active: 1994–present
- Children: 5
- Relatives: Simon Merrells

Jason Scott Merrells is an English actor, known for his roles in Casualty, Queer as Folk, Cutting It, Waterloo Road and Emmerdale.

== Early life and education ==
Merrells was born in Epping, Essex. His brother Simon Merrells is also an actor. Merrells studied at Chichester University.

== Career ==
Merrells got his first role in 1994 with an appearance in the film To Die For, in which he played a small part. However, he soon established himself as a successful television actor with his role as receptionist Matt Hawley in the medical drama Casualty. In 1999 he portrayed Phil Delaney in the television series Queer as Folk. He continued to appear in more prominent roles for years to come including in films such as Do Not Disturb (1999). His television appearances also became more frequent, and he had a recurring appearance as Martin Leach in Clocking Off between 2000 and 2001. However it was his portrayal of stylist Gavin Ferraday in the BBC One television drama series Cutting It that brought him wide notice. This followed with appearances in television shows such as The Afternoon Play, Where the Heart Is and Murder City, and a starring role in the 2005 film The Jealous God.

Merrells announced that he had been cast in the role of headteacher Jack Rimmer in the BBC One school-based drama Waterloo Road, making Merrells one of the original stars of the show appearing in the very first episode. In 2009, Merrells appeared throughout series two of Lark Rise to Candleford as James Dowland.

From 2010 to 2014, Merrells achieved popularity through his role as shrewd businessman Declan Macey in the long-running ITV soap opera Emmerdale. In September 2014, it was announced that Merrells had decided to quit his role after four years on the soap. Declan left the following month, going into hiding after killing his half-nephew Robbie Lawson (Jamie Shelton) and attempting to murder his most recent wife, Charity Macey (Emma Atkins), whom he married earlier in the year. In 2015, Merrells appeared as Stuart Howe in the BBC TV series Death in Paradise episode 4.7. From 2016 onwards, Merrells has portrayed Sir Charles Fraith in Agatha Raisin.

In January 2023, Merrells appeared as DC Stead in the third series of BBC drama Happy Valley for three episodes. In 2024, it was announced that he would be reprising his role as Jack Rimmer in the fifteenth series of Waterloo Road.

=== Theatre ===
From August to October 2007, Merrells performed with the Royal Shakespeare Company at the Courtyard Theatre in Stratford-upon-Avon. He played the role of Orsino in William Shakespeare's Twelfth Night, or What You Will alongside his brother Simon Merrells who played Antonio. The Merrells brothers then went on to tour in A Comedy of Errors with the Royal Shakespeare Company from October to December 2007. From March to April 2009 he appeared in the Theatre Royal Plymouth and Thelma Hunt production of Measure for Measure as Angelo alongside Alistair McGowan as the Duke. The production transferred to the Almeida Theatre in February 2010. From May to June 2015, he starred as Juror number 8 in Bill Kenwright's touring production of Twelve Angry Men, alongside Andrew Lancel, Gareth David-Lloyd, Denis Lill and Drop the Dead Donkey's Robert Duncan.

From January to July 2023, Merrells starred as Frank Galvin in Middleground Theatre Company's theatrical adaptation of Barry Reed's 1980 novel The Verdict.

In January 2024, he reprised his role as juror 8 in a stage adaptation of Twelve Angry Men.

== Personal life ==
Jason lives part-time in London and spends the rest of his time in the North East of England. He has five children from three relationships.

== Filmography ==
=== Film ===
Year	Film	Role	Notes
1994	To Die For	Nigel	
1999	Do Not Disturb	Mulder	
2000	Small Time Obsession	Chris	
2000	Calling The Wild	Matt	Television film
2005	The Jealous God	Vincent	
2015	Elsewhere	Traveling Salesman	Short film
2016	Bumps	Richard	Short film
2019	Trick or Treat	Bizzie	

=== Television ===
Year	Title	Role	Notes
1994–1997	Casualty	Matt Hawley	Series regular; 70 episodes
1997	Thief Takers	Steve Lunt	Episode: "Road Rage"
1997	The Bill	Richard McAuliffe	Episode: "Out"
1998	Verdict	Ben Clayton	Episode: "The Doctor's Opinion"
1999	Queer as Folk	Phil Delaney	Recurring role; 3 episodes
2000–2001	Clocking Off	Martin Leach	Series regular; 12 episodes
2000–2002	Fat Friends	Carl Whittaker (later Watkinson)	Recurring role; 3 episodes
2002	A Touch of Frost	Mike Patterson	Episode: "Mistaken Identity"
2002	The Inspector Lynley Mysteries	Steve Shepherd	Episode: "Missing Joseph"
2002	The Project	Dougie	Miniseries; 2 episodes
2002–2005	Cutting It	Gavin Ferraday	Series regular; 25 episodes
2003	Sweet Medicine	Dr. Nick Sweet	Series regular; 10 episodes
2005	The Afternoon Play	John Priestley	Episode: "The Hitch"
2005	Where the Heart Is	Ryan Saunders	Episode: "In a Perfect World"
2006	Murder City	Mark Drummond	Episode: "Wives and Lovers"
2006–2007, 2008, 2025–present	Waterloo Road	Jack Rimmer	Main role
2009	Lark Rise to Candleford	James Dowland	Series regular; 11 episodes
2010	Agatha Christie's Marple	Dr. Kerrigan	Episode: "The Pale Horse"
2010–2014	Emmerdale	Declan Macey	Series regular; 622 episodes
2015	Death in Paradise	Stuart Howe	Episode: "She Was Murdered Twice"
2015	Safe House	David Blackwell	Recurring role; 4 episodes
2016–2022	Agatha Raisin	Sir Charles Fraith	Recurring role; 15 episodes
2018	Midsomer Murders	Paul Taylor	Episode: "The Ghost of Causton Abbey"
2019	Jesus: His Life	Pilate	Recurring role; 5 episodes
2020	Endeavour	Martin Gorman	Episode: "Raga"
2021	Finding Alice	Harry	Series regular; 6 episodes
2023	Happy Valley	DC Stead	Recurring role; 3 episodes
2026	The Marlow Murder Club	Paul	2 episodes

== Awards and nominations ==
Year	Award	Category	Work	Result	Ref.
2003	9th National Television Awards	Most Popular Actor	Cutting It	Nominated	
2012	The British Soap Awards	Villain of the Year	Emmerdale	Nominated	
2014	19th National Television Awards	Serial Drama Performance	Emmerdale	Nominated	
2014	The British Soap Awards	Best Actor	Emmerdale	Nominated	
2014	Inside Soap Awards	Best Actor	Emmerdale	Nominated	
2015	20th National Television Awards	Serial Drama Performance	Emmerdale	Nominated	
