= List of Emmerdale characters introduced in 2012 =

Emmerdale is a British soap opera first broadcast on 16 October 1972. The following is a list of characters that first appeared during 2012, by order of first appearance. All characters were introduced by the soap's executive producer, Steve Frost. Ed Roberts (Lloyd Everitt), a love interest for Aaron Livesy (Danny Miller), made his debut appearance in February, followed by Declan Macey's (Jason Merrells) half-sister, Megan (Gaynor Faye) shortly after, her son Robbie Lawson (Jamie Shelton) first appeared in May, while Amy Wyatt's (Chelsea Halfpenny) biological mother Kerry (Laura Norton) arrived in July. Steve Harland (Tom Mannion), Vanessa Woodfield (Michelle Hardwick), Dominic Andrews (Wil Johnson) and Gemma Andrews (Tendai Rinomhota) all made their debuts in December. There were three births in 2012, Jack Sugden, the son of Andy Sugden (Kelvin Fletcher) and Debbie Dingle (Charley Webb), and Molly Sharma, the daughter of Nikhil Sharma (Rik Makarem) and Gennie Walker (Sian Reese-Williams) were born in October, while Archie Breckle, the son of Jai Sharma (Chris Bisson) and Rachel Breckle (Gemma Oaten) was born in December. Additionally, multiple other characters appeared in 2012.

== Ed Roberts ==
Ed Roberts
- Emmerdale character
- Portrayed by: Lloyd Everitt
- First appearance: Episode 6155; 8 February 2012
- Last appearance: Episode 6205; 5 April 2012
- Introduced by: Steve Frost
In-universe information
- Occupation: Rugby player

Ed Roberts, played by Lloyd Everitt, made his debut appearance on 8 February 2012. Ed arrives in Emmerdale with a broken down minibus and takes it to Aaron Livesy (Danny Miller) to fix. A writer for Inside Soap said there is a spark of attraction between Ed and Aaron, but Aaron dismisses it because he is unsure whether Ed is interested in guys. Aaron wants to move on from Jackson Walsh (Marc Silcock) and an Emmerdale spokesperson told the magazine "With the arrival of Ed, the darkness that has been haunting Aaron begins to disappear." However, Ed and Aaron's potential romance does not get off to a good start when Ed drives off without paying for the repairs to the minibus. Aaron thinks Ed has gone for good, but he later returns to settle the bill. Ed has been described as being "handsome" and "hunky." Anthony D. Langford of AfterElton said Aaron and Ed's scenes often revolved around Aaron's past with Jackson, which he explained was too heavy and not romantic for their fledgling relationship. Langford added "This of course raises the question of why a smart and funny guy like Ed would want to deal with the emotional mess that is Aaron Livesy."

Ed brings a minibus to the garage for Aaron to fix. However, when Aaron becomes involved in an argument with Adam Barton (Adam Thomas), Ed leaves. He later returns with his rugby teammates and Aaron fixes the minibus, but Ed drives off without paying all of the bill. Ed comes back to the village to give Aaron the rest of the money for the work on the minibus and he invites him to a party. Ed brings his car to the garage for Aaron to look at and he later gives him his number. Aaron arranges to go for a drink with Ed, but he cancels to help Adam fix a roof. Ed finds out what Aaron is doing and he and two of his teammates comes to help. Holly Barton (Sophie Powles) flirts with Ed and he reveals he is gay. Ed mistakes Aaron and Adam's friendship for something more, but Aaron corrects him and they kiss. Aaron and Ed go on their first date to Bar West, but Ed leaves early when the barman tells him that Aaron helped his previous boyfriend, Jackson to die. Aaron becomes angry with Ed, but he later calls him and they meet up. Aaron and Ed talk and Aaron reveals his scars from self harming. Ed is not fazed and they spend the night together. Ed later tells Aaron that he has been signed for a French rugby club and is leaving for France in four weeks. He asks Aaron to come with him and he agrees.

== Megan Macey ==
Megan Macey
- Emmerdale character
- Portrayed by: Gaynor Faye
- Duration: 2012–2019
- First appearance: Episode 6166; 21 February 2012
- Last appearance: Episode 8578; 27 August 2019
- Introduced by: Steve Frost
In-universe information
- Other names: Megan Sharma
- Occupation: Business consultant Wedding Planner
- Father: Dermot Macey
- Half-brothers: Declan Macey
- Husband: Jai Sharma (2015–2016)
- Sons: Robbie Lawson
- Daughters: Eliza Sharma
- Stepsons: Archie Breckle (2015–2016)
- Nieces: Mia Macey (adoptive)

Megan Macey (previously Sharma) played by Gaynor Faye, made her first on screen appearance on 21 February 2012. The character and casting was announced on 12 October 2011. Faye said she was "incredibly excited" to be joining Emmerdale and series producer Stuart Blackburn added he was thrilled to welcome the actress to the show. Faye later revealed she has a twelve-month contract with Emmerdale.

Megan is Declan Macey's (Jason Merrells) glamorous half-sister, arriving at Home Farm to stay with Declan after he contacts her about getting involved with a big project. She is described as "fiercely ambitious, intimidating and oozing self-confidence," she stands up for herself and will shake things up between Declan and his girlfriend, Katie Sugden (Sammy Winward). Of her character, Faye said "The women on Emmerdale are strong and feisty and I can't wait to play my character, who's fun but extremely driven and will stop at nothing to get her own way! She's quite different to many of the roles that I have played before and hopefully will take people by surprise." Nicola Methven of the Daily Mirror said Megan will "turn the heads of the village men." Speaking to a writer for the Daily Mirror, Faye said she could not wait to start playing Megan, who she branded "a baddie". The actress said viewers are used to seeing her play nice characters and her new role is a departure from that, as Megan will cause mayhem and stir up the men and women of the village. A writer for Soaplife magazine said that since Kim Tate (Claire King) left Emmerdale there had not been a "Lady of the Home Farm Manor to fill her designer boots." They said that Megan's arrival could change that, and added that if Megan is half the woman Kim was, she will do more than "just surprise."

In April 2012, it was revealed Declan would track down Megan's son, Robbie Lawson (Jamie Shelton), who she gave up for adoption when she was a teenager. Faye said Megan would be furious if she knew what Declan was up to. She explained "Megan is always telling Declan to keep his nose out of her life. They may be good at business together, but they're not good at each other's personal lives. And him interfering in this is going too far." Of Megan's past, Faye revealed that she was in her late teens when she had Robbie and because no one was there for her, it was decided she should put him up for adoption. Faye added "She hasn't seen Robbie since she gave him up. She ignored a letter he wrote to her years back, but finding him is still something that's always at the back of her mind."

Megan moves into Home Farm, after being asked by Declan to be the events organiser of a festival in Emmerdale. She demands to know why she was not invited to Declan's stepdaughter Mia's (Sapphire Elia) funeral and has an argument with Charity Sharma (Emma Atkins), who hoped that she would have got the job. She has a fling with Cain Dingle (Jeff Hordley), Charity's ex, resulting in a fight between the two. When Megan badmouths Katie, Declan tells Megan to leave once the festival has finished. Megan meets her old friend Jai Sharma (Chris Bisson) in The Woolpack and Declan demands that she should stay away from him. When the two talk, they look back on the past lives and Declan apologises for not being there for her when he left the family home aged nineteen. Declan later tracks down Megan's long lost son, Robbie, and Megan becomes furious that he went behind her back and slaps Declan. Robbie arrives at Home Farm and tells her that she will never be his mother, stating that his adoptive mother died of an asthma attack previously. When Declan invites Robbie to stay with them after he slept with his landlord's girlfriend, Megan tells him that she feels uncomfortable with him being around. During the summer, she begins a relationship with Carl King (Tom Lister). However, he dumps her, because of his feelings for Chas Dingle (Lucy Pargeter). The festival goes well and he invites Megan to plan for another one, the following year. Megan agrees, but Katie becomes unimpressed and tries to make her leave, especially when Robbie threatens her. During Declan and Katie's wedding reception, Megan pushes Katie's face into the wedding cake.

The following year, the festival plans do not go well and the police find Alex Moss' (Kurtis Stacey) body buried in the woods. When Katie and Declan's marriage ends, Megan tells Declan that they haven't got enough money for another festival and decides to leave the village. However, she decides to stay after Declan says that he needs her. Declan begins physically abusing Megan by hitting her across the face on numerous occasions. Eventually, Katie witnesses one of Declan's attacks and sticks up for Megan, despite Megan saying that it was just a misunderstanding. On Boxing Day, Megan enters a fire at Home Farm, believing that Declan is trapped inside, but she is unaware that he caused the fire and left earlier with Charity. Megan becomes trapped herself but is later freed by the fire brigade. Megan is not impressed in April 2014 when Declan announces he is engaged to Charity and that she is pregnant with his child. They plan to get married on 15 May 2014, although Charity's cousin and former boyfriend Cain and his fiancée Moira Barton (Natalie J. Robb) also intend to marry on that day. Only Megan, Robbie and Charity's son Noah (Jack Downham) attend, as the rest of Charity's family are at Cain's wedding. Just as the registrar pronounces them husband and wife, Megan sounds the fire alarm, which infuriates Charity. When she finds out what Megan has done, Charity slaps her and a small fight ensues, although Declan stops them.

Unbeknownst to Declan and Megan, but Charity has her pregnancy terminated as she never wanted a child. When Charity is having an argument with Megan, and Megan accidentally knocks Charity to the floor, Charity uses the accident to fake a miscarriage. Megan, becoming ever more guilty, reveals this to Declan, who shouts at her and throws her out. Megan then begins a relationship with Jai and becomes business partners with Leyla Harding (Roxy Shahidi). Megan becomes devastated when she identifies Robbie's body after being shot with a flare gun by Declan. She blames Charity and demands to know where Declan is. On the day of Robbie's funeral, she begins to doubt how well she knew her son, after seeing his friends. The following day, Declan returns and holds Megan hostage, along with Charity's family and tells everyone what Charity did to Rachel Breckle (Gemma Oaten). Declan goes on the run and Megan tries to get her revenge on Charity. She becomes relieved when Charity is sentenced for two years in prison for perverting the course of justice.

Megan and Jai become engaged and they get married in January 2015. When Rachel returns, Jai tries to win a custody battle for Archie. After realising that Leyla and Jai were having an affair, Megan decides to get her revenge and promises Rachel she will make sure Jai loses custody of Archie. After Leyla finds out that Jai has been threatening Rachel, she tells Megan. In the midst of arranging her revenge on Jai, Megan is shocked to realize she is pregnant. Megan contacts Jai's drug dealer, and plants drugs in the factory to get Jai arrested for them, however, Jai finds out and threatens to turn the tables on Megan. At this point, Megan reveals she is pregnant, and Jai backs down. Megan agrees to help Jai gain custody of Archie, however, at the day of the custody hearing, Megan begins experiencing stomach cramps and is taken to hospital. She tells Leyla that she had a miscarriage and rushes to court, getting there just in time to tell the court everything about Jai's actions against Rachel, and framing her as an unfit mother. As a result, Rachel gains custody of Archie, and a few weeks later, moves to Liverpool with Archie. Megan tells Jai that he has now truly lost everything, and leaves him. Leyla also rejects Jai. Megan starts packing up her things and moves in with Rachel's ex Sam Dingle (James Hooton), revealing that she did not miscarry Jai's baby. Megan files for a divorce and Jai tells Sam and Megan that they are evicted from their house. Jai's father Rishi Sharma (Bhasker Patel) stops him from evicting them, leading to Megan thanking him. Jai's brother, Nikhil (Rik Makarem), returns and finds out that Megan is expecting Jai's baby. Megan begs him to keep the pregnancy secret, expressing that Jai is dangerous and doesn't want the baby to grow up with him as a father. Megan decides to leave the village when Brenda Walker (Lesley Dunlop) exposes her pregnancy. Jai finds out about the pregnancy, not long before she leaves and in anger, he accidentally runs Megan over. At hospital, she discovers that she is having a baby girl and demands Jai should leave her life for good. A few months after her accident, she witnesses Tess being involved in a hit and run and she calls an ambulance. Upon learning from Tess' death, she suffers from shock and decides to rest for the sake of her baby. She goes into labour prematurely and learns that the baby was starved from oxygen and has a low chance of survival. She names her daughter, Eliza, when she is taken out of the neo-natal intensive unit. Following regular check-ups with the doctor, Megan is devastated after finding out there is a possibility that Eliza has cerebral palsy. After the news, Megan allows Jai to have some access into Eliza's life.

In March 2018, Megan suspects Priya of child abuse against her daughter when she confesses to having an outburst towards Eliza after bruises are found by Jai on the toddler's legs following her 2nd birthday party. This belief is strengthened when the bruises disappear after Megan takes full custody of her. Ultimately, however, Priya's innocence is proved when Megan finds that Eliza's bruises have returned in early April and are determined to be the result of her medication for epilepsy.

Led to believe that her partner Frank Clayton (Michael Praed) is cheating on her, Megan becomes enraged and has an affair with Graham Foster (Andrew Scarborough), only to find that Frank was making arrangements for a marriage proposal to her. Though she inadvertently reveals her affair to Tracy Metcalfe (Amy Walsh), Frank's daughter is convinced to keep Megan's secret for her father's sake.

== Robbie Lawson ==
Robbie Lawson
- Emmerdale character
- Portrayed by: Jamie Shelton
- Duration: 2012–2014
- First appearance: Episode 6239; 16 May 2012
- Last appearance: Episode 6983; 25 September 2014
- Introduced by: Steve Frost
In-universe information
- Occupation: Courier driver (2013–2014)
- Father: Simon Beck
- Mother: Megan Macey
- Half-sisters: Eliza Sharma
- Grandfathers: Dermot Macey
- Uncles: Declan Macey
- First cousins: Mia Macey (adoptive)

Robbie Lawson, played by Jamie Shelton, made his first screen appearance on 16 May 2012. The character and Shelton's casting were announced on 4 April 2012. The actor told a reporter from the official Emmerdale website, that he was excited to join the cast because Robbie is "a great character to play". Robbie will be involved with characters within the setting of Home Farm. He will share a specific connection to the character of Megan Macey (Gaynor Faye), with his arrival confronting her "with a past she had hoped to forget". Robbie will also "test the loyalties of everyone around him". The serial's producer Stuart Blackburn spoke of his delight over Shelton's casting, adding that his character would "certainly stir things up at Home Farm". Robbie is described as "tough nut" and is used to putting up a front, a personality trait that Blackburn said would take a while to get past. Of Robbie, Kate White of Inside Soap said "We must admit to being intrigued by Emmerdale new boy Robbie. He's mysterious, he's got an edge, and he's even made Megan's scenes bearable. Long may it continue!"

On 26 September 2014, it was confirmed that Robbie had been killed off, as part of a storyline that saw him trying to save Charity Macey (Emma Atkins) from his uncle Declan (Jason Merrells). Shelton filmed his final scenes a few weeks prior to the storyline airing. Of his departure, Shelton said "My time on Emmerdale has been such an exhilarating experience. From my first day until my last I've been treated with respect, had the opportunity to work with some fine actors and been allowed to develop my acting ability in a way that I couldn't have in any other circumstance. I hope I have made a positive impact on the show and I am extremely excited for my career to be further concentrated towards TV and film in the UK and transatlantic."

Megan was living at Home Farm in Emmerdale village with her brother Declan Macey (Jason Merrells), who tracked Robbie down. Robbie told Declan that he had been thrown out of his flat after he slept with his landlord's girlfriend, so Declan invited him to stay at Home Farm. Robbie bonded with his mother and he developed a crush on Declan's girlfriend Katie Sugden (Sammy Winward). Robbie then tried to kiss Katie, but she rejected him, so he made her feel uncomfortable by constantly flirting with her. Wanting rid of him, Katie decided to set Robbie up by encouraging him to kiss her in front of a CCTV camera. Robbie did so but Katie rejected him again, so he punched her. Katie then showed Declan the footage and he threw Robbie out until Megan blackmailed Declan into letting him stay (knowing that Katie had set him up).

The following year, Robbie went into partnership with Debbie Dingle (Charley Webb), selling illegal alcohol. He developed an unrequited crush on Debbie and wanting to become closer to her, Robbie started stalking/harassing Debbie and he led her to believe that an associate Kirk Stoker was responsible. Debbie then realised that Robbie had been stalking her, so she set him up by sending him on a job, delivering some of the alcohol with Adam Barton (Adam Thomas). They were both caught by the police and arrested, but were later cautioned. Robbie got revenge on Debbie by telling her family about the booze, which resulted in Belle Dingle (Eden Taylor-Draper) being hospitalised. As a result, Debbie lost custody of her children. Meanwhile, Robbie and Adam stole Cain Dingle's (Jeff Hordley) car after spending the afternoon drinking. Robbie accidentally runs over Kerry Wyatt (Laura Norton). However, Cain resolves the situation by torching the car and sending Kerry compensation money.

When Declan's wife Charity (Emma Atkins) secretly has an abortion, she pretends to have had a miscarriage following a fight with Megan. Robbie supports his mother and he attempts to expose Charity by breaking into the abortion clinic to gain access to her medical records. However, he is caught by the police and arrested before being given a caution. Declan later discovers the truth and he attempts to murder Charity. A concerned Robbie and Megan eventually find Declan and Charity having a fight on a boat that is stranded in the lake. Robbie dives into the lake to save Charity, but as he gets onto the boat, Declan accidentally shoots Robbie dead with a flare gun.

== Kerry Wyatt ==
Kerry Pollard
- Emmerdale character
- Portrayed by: Laura Norton
- Duration: 2012–present
- First appearance: Episode 6292; 17 July 2012
- Introduced by: Steve Frost
In-universe information
- Occupation: Beautician; Hairdresser; Sweet Packer; Housekeeper
- Husband: Kev Berry (until 2014); Dan Spencer (2014; void); Eric Pollard (2025–present)
- Daughters: Amy Wyatt; Chloe Harris
- Stepsons: David Metcalfe (2025-)
- Grandsons: Kyle Dingle; Reuben Harris; Jacob Gallagher (step)

Kerry Pollard, played by Laura Norton, made her first screen appearance on 17 July 2012. The character and casting was announced on 31 May 2012. Norton began filming her first scenes in June. Of joining Emmerdale, the actress said "I am delighted to have been given this role. Emmerdale has always been my favourite soap and it's a joy and privilege to be joining the team." Series producer Stuart Blackburn commented that Norton is "a fantastic actor" and that it was a delight to welcome her to the cast. Norton announced her pregnancy in 2020 and due to the COVID-19 pandemic in the United Kingdom, she stopped appearing on screen. Kerry's last appearance was on 5 June 2020. On 24 October 2021, it was announced that Norton had returned to filming from maternity leave and her return scenes aired on 1 November 2021 as part of a storyline that sees her working as Chloe Harris' (Jessie Elland) housekeeper. Norton left for maternity leave on 18 November 2022, Kerry has since made appearances via video call on 24 April 2023 and 17 August 2023.

Kerry is the mother of established character, Amy Wyatt (Chelsea Halfpenny). Daniel Kilkelly of Digital Spy reported Kerry was heartbroken when Amy was taken into foster care. He stated that Kerry is "wayward" and guaranteed to liven things up for her daughter and her foster parents Val (Charlie Hardwick) and Eric Pollard (Chris Chittell). Norton described Kerry as being "an amazing and unpredictable, appealing character". She added that she could not wait to play Amy's "reckless mum." Amy meets her mother while she is out celebrating her birthday. She flirts with a man, who turns out to be Kerry's boyfriend. Kerry then follows her daughter back to the village, hoping to be a part of her life. In August 2017, Norton was longlisted for Funniest Female at the Inside Soap Awards. She did not progress to the viewer-voted shortlist.

Kerry's storylines have included trying to repair her relationship with daughter Amy (Chelsea Halfpenny), her struggle with diabetes, a relationship with Andy Sugden (Kelvin Fletcher), accidentally starting a fire at Andy's house and almost killing herself and his children, faking a pregnancy after discovering that Andy and Amy are in a relationship, being run over by Adam Barton (Adam Thomas), trying to help Brenda Walker (Lesley Dunlop) overcome her addiction of shoplifting, a relationship with Dan Spencer (Liam Fox), faking a terminal illness in order to get a free wedding to Dan and being uncovered as a bigamist on her wedding day to Dan.

While on a night out, Kerry sees her boyfriend, Chris Fletcher (Michael Taylor), kissing Amy. Kerry breaks them up and smacks Amy before hitting Chris with her handbag and Amy realises that Kerry is her mother. After Kerry is thrown out of the club, Amy reveals that she is her daughter. Kerry tries to talk to Amy and she gives her her phone number. Kerry later finds Amy's address on Facebook and she comes to Emmerdale to make amends. However, she meets Val Pollard (Charlie Hardwick), who tells her to leave. Kerry thanks Val for her help in raising Amy, but vows to come back and sort things out.

Kerry begins dating Andy Sugden (Kelvin Fletcher). However, Debbie Dingle (Charley Webb), begins leaving her kids with Andy and Kerry which Kerry soon becomes annoyed about. One night, Kerry gets drunk and drops a cigarette on the rug, setting Andy's house on fire, nearly killing herself and baby Jack. She and Jack are saved by Andy, Amy, and Cain Dingle (Jeff Hordley), after Andy's daughter, Sarah, raises the alarm. Andy nearly attacks Kerry and ends their relationship. After getting into a fight with Debbie in the street over the situation, Kerry goes on holiday for a few weeks. Kerry returns but is horrified to see Andy and Amy kissing and tells them she is pregnant. However, it is revealed she is lying when she asks a pregnant woman to use a pregnancy test. Kerry shows it to Andy and he buys her another one but the pregnant woman also urinated in a little cup and Kerry tricks Andy into believing she's pregnant. However, he is not convinced and Andy tells her to have an abortion because he will not support her. When drowning her sorrows with a can of beer, Kerry is run over by Adam Barton (Adam Thomas) driving a stolen car. Kerry is rushed to hospital and Cain helps Adam dispose of the stolen car.

When Bernice Blackstock (Samantha Giles) announces her plans to open up a salon in the village, Kerry is eager to be involved and proves her skills by giving Pearl Ladderbanks (Meg Johnson) and Betty Eagleton (Paula Tilbrook) makeovers. Kerry is desperate to marry Dan, but he is reluctant to propose, so pretends that her diabetes is being treated as a terminal illness in order to win a free wedding. However, Dan proposes to Kerry when he and Eric Pollard (Chris Chittell) do a skydive with a banner asking Kerry to marry him. Despite the wedding up in arms thanks to her sleazy brother-in-law-to-be, Daz Spencer (Mark Jordon), Kerry is devastated that the wedding might not go ahead. Thankfully Chas makes Dan realise Kerry is the best thing to happen to him and when he rushes to the church, he and Kerry marry. As the reception unfolds in the Woolpack, a man arrives in the village looking for Kerry. Inside the Woolpack, Dan's best mate Bob Hope (Tony Audenshaw) is asking the guests to say something about Dan or Kerry. The man reveals himself as Kev (Christopher Connel), and tells the guests that he married Kerry in Las Vegas and he has tried to track down Kerry so he could end the marriage, and he would be able to marry his new partner, Edith. A scuffle ensues, with Kerry, Dan, Daz, and Kev all ending up being arrested, Kerry for bigamy, and the men for affray.

In 2024, Gary Gillatt from Inside Soap praised Kerry working in The Woolpack, writing that "Putting Kerry behind the Woolpack bar is Emmerdale's best idea this year. Reet class, bonnie lass." In 2025, Chloe Timms from the same magazine called Kerry's new romance with Jai Sharma (Chris Bisson) "sweet" but questioned what the chances of it surviving was.

== Jack Sugden ==
Jack Sugden
- Emmerdale character
- Portrayed by: Louis Webster (2012); Seth Ball (2012–2019)
- Duration: 2012–2019
- First appearance: Episode 6371/2; 17 October 2012
- Last appearance: Episode 8564; 13 August 2019
- Introduced by: Steve Frost
In-universe information
- Family: Sugden
- Father: Andy Sugden
- Mother: Debbie Dingle
- Stepfather: Pete Barton
- Stepmother: Katie Sugden
- Sisters: Sarah Sugden
- Grandfathers: Billy Hopwood; Cain Dingle; Jack Sugden (adoptive)
- Grandmothers: Charity Dingle; Sarah Sugden (adoptive)
- Uncles: Ryan Stocks; Nate Robinson; Noah Dingle; Moses Dingle; Robert Sugden (adoptive); John Sugden (adoptive)
- Aunts: Victoria Sugden (adoptive)
- Nieces: Leyla Sugden (adoptive)
- First cousins: Oscar Grisham; Sebastian White (adoptive); Harry Sugden (adoptive)
- Other relatives: Zak Dingle; Obadiah Dingle; Faith Dingle; Chas Dingle; Aaron Dingle; Sam Dingle; Belle Dingle; Samson Dingle

Jack Sugden, played primarily by Seth Ball is Andy Sugden (Kelvin Fletcher) and Debbie Dingle's (Charley Webb) son, who was born during the 40th anniversary live episode. He was conceived in a bid to save the life of their young daughter, Sarah (Sophia Amber Moore) after she was diagnosed with Fanconi anemia. Jack was named after Andy's late adoptive father, Jack Sugden (Clive Hornby)

Jack left the series in January 2016, when his mother, Debbie moved away, however returned a year later with his mother and sister, but departed again with Debbie in 2019.

== Molly Sharma ==
Molly Sharma
- Emmerdale character
- Portrayed by: Maia Rose Smith (2012–2013); Uncredited (2015–2016)
- Duration: 2012–2013, 2015–2016
- First appearance: Episode 6371/2; 17 October 2012
- Last appearance: Episode 7430; 19 February 2016
- Introduced by: Steve Frost
In-universe information
- Father: Nikhil Sharma
- Mother: Gennie Walker
- Grandfathers: Rishi Sharma; Shadrach Dingle
- Grandmothers: Georgia Sharma; Brenda Walker (adoptive)
- Uncles: Jai Sharma
- Aunts: Chas Dingle; Priya Sharma
- First cousins: Mia Macey; Archie Breckle; Amba Metcalfe; Eliza Sharma

Molly Sharma, played by Maia Rose Smith is Nikhil Sharma (Rik Makarem) and Gennie Walker's (Sian Reese-Williams) daughter, who was born at The Grange B&B during the 40th anniversary live episode. Following her mother's death, Nikhil left the village with Molly for Toronto. She is later seen when Brenda (Lesley Dunlop) is talking to her via Skype on 26 December 2013. Her grandmother, Brenda, is later seen showing photos of her from Nikhil on the anniversary of her mother's death. Brenda also visits Molly and Nikhil for a day when Nikhil visits London on business.

Molly returns on 29 October 2015 when Nikhil visits his dad, Rishi (Bhasker Patel), however she returns to Canada with her father on 19 February 2016.

== Steve Harland ==
Steve Harland
- Emmerdale character
- Portrayed by: Tom Mannion
- Duration: 2012–2013
- First appearance: Episode 6416; 6 December 2012
- Last appearance: Episode 6655; 11 September 2013
- Introduced by: Steve Frost
In-universe information
- Occupation: Horse trainer
- Wife: Sue Harland (until 2012)

Steve Harland, played by Tom Mannion, made his first screen appearance on 6 December 2012. The character and Mannion's casting was announced on 25 October 2012. David Brown from the Radio Times reported that Mannion and Michelle Hardwick (Vanessa Woodfield) had already filmed their first scenes. Of his casting, Mannion commented "I'm really looking forward to the adventure that is Emmerdale." Mannion revealed that he undertook research for his character's occupation as a horse trainer, saying "I had a few conversations with a couple of trainers - in particular one of which used to train for the Queen - just really to get the lay of the land of what Steve's life might have been like. It's good to know, just to have in the background."

Steve is Bernice Blackstock's (Samantha Giles) "charismatic" married lover. He is described as being "a passionate, optimistic man who likes to get the most out of life." Daniel Kilkelly from Digital Spy revealed that the traits that attracted Steve to Bernice may end up driving him mad. During an interview with Kilkelly, Mannion stated that Steve arrives in Emmerdale to see Bernice and reveals that he has not yet broken up with his wife. However, Bernice's sister, Nicola (Nicola Wheeler), later calls Steve's wife to let her know about the affair. On Steve's past and the affair with Bernice, Mannion explained "This is presumption and assumption on my part, but from what I suspect, this is the first time this has happened to Steve. I don't think he has done this before - he's not a practised philanderer. An affair is not the norm for him. I think Steve has been totally swept up by this gorgeous, attractive woman who has come into his life. He's just gone, 'Wow this is really different'. I don't think he expected it to go the way it has, and now he's terrified about his marriage break-up. He has found himself in a situation he isn't prepared for." Steve is forced into making a fresh start and Mannion told Kilkelly that he has a bit of money and will pay his way by working with horses.

Steve arrives and announces to Bernice that his wife has left him. Bernice and Steve have an ill-fated relationship during his long stay at the village. He turns his attentions to her sister, Nicola King, and even funds for her daughter Angelica's education. Steve then announces to Nicola that he will not continue funding for Angelica's education unless she sleeps with him. Nicola tells Bernice about Steve's indecent proposal. Bernice tearfully tells Steve that she walked out on her marriage for him and throws him out the house. Steve then leaves the village.

== Vanessa Woodfield ==
Vanessa Woodfield
- Emmerdale character
- Portrayed by: Michelle Hardwick
- Duration: 2012–2022, 2024–present
- First appearance: Episode 6418; 10 December 2012
- Introduced by: Steve Frost
In-universe information
- Occupation: Vet
- Father: Frank Clayton
- Half-sisters: Tracy Robinson
- Sons: Johnny Woodfield
- Nieces: Frankie Robinson

Vanessa Woodfield, played by Michelle Hardwick, made her first screen appearance on 10 December 2012. The character and Hardwick's casting was announced on 25 October 2012. Hardwick stated "As a local girl and a fan of the show, Emmerdale is my dream job. After only 2 days I am starting to feel at home already and Vanessa is such a fun character I can't wait to see what's in store for her." Vanessa is "a wild friend" of Rhona Goskirk's (Zoë Henry) from college. Vanessa has been described as being "a self-assured party girl" and "a breath of fresh air". She is plain-speaking and initially clashed with Rhona's husband, Paddy Kirk (Dominic Brunt) when she arrived at the vets' practice. Hardwick announced her pregnancy in 2020 and that she would be taking maternity leave from Emmerdale. As a result of the COVID-19 pandemic in the United Kingdom, Vanessa did not get a proper exit storyline and last appeared on 3 June 2020. She made guest appearances on 12, 27, 29 and 30 October. The character reappeared on a regular basis from 29 December 2021, with Hardwick having returned to work full-time. Vanessa left again on 30 November 2022, when Hardwick went on a second maternity leave, returning on 9 February 2024.

Rhona invites Vanessa to Emmerdale after she fires her locum vet. Paddy becomes jealous of Vanessa and Rhona's friendship. Vanessa later humiliates him in front of Edna Birch (Shirley Stelfox), when they discuss payment for her dog's treatment.

In the local pub, Vanessa eyes up Andy Sugden (Kelvin Fletcher) at the bar and suggests that she and Rhona go on a night out. When Vanessa goes to Butler's Farm, she walks in on Moira Barton (Natalie J. Robb) and Cain Dingle (Jeff Hordley) kissing. She returns the next day and apologizes to Moira. They sit down together and tell each other about their pasts. Vanessa is distraught when Katie Addyman's (Sammy Winward) horse dies whilst in her care. Katie threatens to sue Vanessa but Rhona helps calm the situation down.

Paddy later helps Vanessa look for a flat but she is distracted by a fire across the road. Vanessa learns that Rhona is addicted to painkillers, after becoming hooked after having trouble with back ache. She tries to help Rhona but it just gets worse. When Rhona and Paddy go on a weekend away with friends Marlon Dingle (Mark Charnock) and Laurel Thomas (Charlotte Bellamy), Rhona buys painkillers and takes them. As a result, Rhona misses Leo's first steps and tells Paddy that she does not feel well, asking him to take her home but then go back to the cabin while Vanessa looks after her. Vanessa confronts her about stealing painkillers from Sandy Thomas (Freddie Jones), leaving him in severe pain. Rhona denies it until Vanessa says she can have more painkillers if she admits it and she does. Vanessa then refuses to give her anything and Rhona slaps Vanessa. Vanessa then tells Rhona that she needs professional help for her addiction. Vanessa realizes that she has feelings for Rhona and tries to help Rhona wean herself off the painkillers. Eventually, Vanessa realizes what she is doing and warns Rhona that if she doesn't stop, she will end up in hospital or even worse dead. Rhona ignores this and pushes Vanessa to give her drugs. Vanessa eventually tells Rhona how she feels but Rhona rejects her, claiming her feelings are "wrong". Vanessa is distraught but continues to give her the painkillers. Rhona eventually visits a drug dealer for more drugs but starts coughing up blood, so Vanessa takes her to hospital. On their return, Paddy confronts Rhona as he thinks she is cheating on him. When he tries to look at her phone, Rhona lashes out and hits him repeatedly but Vanessa supports Rhona and wanting more drugs, Rhona reveals that she is in love with Vanessa and kisses her passionately. Vanessa and Rhona begin a brief affair but are rumbled when Paddy catches them kissing. Paddy refuses to believe Rhona is a lesbian and stays with Marlon and Laurel. Rhona tells Vanessa that she was only using her to get painkillers, insulting her and throws her out. Vanessa stays with Moira and learns that Rhona has overdosed and meets Marlon and Paddy at the hospital. There, Vanessa tells Marlon, Paddy and Moira that Rhona is addicted to painkillers and why she lied to Paddy. Paddy attacks Vanessa but Marlon and Moira restrain him. Rhona wakes up and Paddy tells her that he knows about her addiction before throwing Vanessa's belongings out on the street. Angrily, Vanessa tells Pearl Ladderbanks (Meg Johnson) that she and Rhona kissed, making Pearl wonder if Rhona is a lesbian before moving in with Moira, Cain and Moira's son Adam Barton (Adam Thomas). Moira tells her that Rhona will be released from hospital soon.

Rhona is discharged and decides to go "cold turkey", rather than go to rehab. Vanessa learns of this and is concerned for Rhona's welfare. Paddy threatens to sack Vanessa but she reminds him that she is a partner, so he cannot and buys Nikhil Sharma's (Rik Makarem) house. Following Cameron Murray's (Dominic Power) hostage siege at The Woolpack, Diane Sugden (Elizabeth Estensen) and Chas Dingle (Lucy Pargeter) stay with her until the pub is complete. When Declan Macey (Jason Merrells) evicts Dom Andrews (Wil Johnson) and his daughter, Gemma (Tendai Rinomhota), Vanessa gives them a place to stay. Vanessa accompanies Dom to the hospital when Gemma is found unconscious and is upset when Gemma dies. She attends Gemma's funeral and helps Dom through the day. In May 2014, Vanessa helps Moira prepare for her wedding day to Cain. After Moira's nephew, Pete Barton (Anthony Quinlan) has a bust-up with his girlfriend, Debbie Dingle (Charley Webb), he confides in Vanessa and they kiss. They both regret it but Debbie sees them hugging.

After visiting Moira, Vanessa panics when she notices the ketamine is missing from her vet bag as Adam, has stolen it and taken a large dose. Paddy urges Vanessa to call the police and Moira is questioned. Vanessa goes on a night out and has a one-night stand with a young man, who appears to be in his 20s. She boasts to Leyla Harding (Roxy Shahidi) about her new boyfriend and realizes it is Priya Sharma's (Fiona Wade) soon-to-be 17-year-old stepson, Kirin Kotecha (Adam Fielding). She visits Kirin and they agree to continue their relationship in secret but are caught by Priya and Leyla. Priya demands Vanessa and Kirin end their relationship for good but Vanessa and Kirin are caught again by Paddy. Kirin later tells Priya and Rakesh about his relationship with Vanessa, angering Priya. After months of dating Kirin, Vanessa decides to end their relationship, fearing being subjected to gossip. Kirin goes out drinking and while driving his father's car home, he collides with Moira's van and sends her sliding off the road. She is rushed to hospital and Kirin faces Moira's husband, Cain. Vanessa is furious with Kirin but forgives him and they reconcile. On his birthday, Kirin notices a lump on one of Vanessa's breasts and they both fear it could be cancer. Kirin promises to support her and Vanessa books a hospital appointment but fails to do so. This leads to Rhona supports Vanessa but gets the all clear.

While taking a break from her relationship with Kirin, Vanessa has a drink with Adam as they are both upset with their respective partners and have a drunken one-night stand. They agree to keep it a secret, not wanting to risk hurting Kirin and Adam's girlfriend, Victoria Sugden (Isabel Hodgins), and try to carry on with their lives. However, Vanessa learns that she is pregnant and isn't sure who is the father. She tells Rhona, who tells her that if she keeps the baby, she has to tell Kirin and Adam. Kirin is ecstatic at the thought of becoming a father but Adam is terrified. Kirin and Vanessa tell Rakesh that she is pregnant and he demands Vanessa have an abortion. Vanessa refuses and Adam tells Moira that the baby could be his, which strains her friendship with Vanessa. Unable to deal with the stress, Vanessa books a DNA test with Adam present. However, when the nurse leaves, Kirin arrives and Adam hides upstairs. When Adam's mobile phone rings, Kirin realizes that he is upstairs and believes that they are having an affair. Vanessa tells him that it is not an affair but Adam could be the baby's father. Kirin then tells Victoria, leaving her disgusted. The following day, Victoria slaps Vanessa but Rhona intervenes. Not wanting his son to be a father yet, Rakesh steals the test results which show that the baby is Kirin's and edits them to make everyone believe that Adam is the father. Adam fails to arrive at Vanessa's scan, which angers her and she makes the decision to leave Emmerdale because she does not want Adam involved in the upbringing of Vanessa's baby.

When Jai gets into a scuffle with Rakesh at a party, he pushes Rakesh into Vanessa, knocking her to the floor. On the way home, she goes into labor prematurely gives birth to a son named Johnny Woodfield (Luca Hepworth) at the hospital. Johnny has respiratory issues is placed in intensive care. Vanessa fears for her baby's health, snapping at her friends and eventually hiding in her house, afraid to see him. Victoria convinces Vanessa to come to the hospital and be there for Johnny. Vanessa suspects Johnny's paternity after finding a birthmark on him that she is told is normal for mixed-race babies to have. She takes another DNA test which shows that Kirin is the father instead of Adam. Adam is devastated at the news and briefly kidnaps Johnny before being convinced by Victoria to return him to his mother. Kirin takes over parenting duties from Adam. He is unable to handle the stress and tells Vanessa that he doesn't love Johnny before fleeing the country.

Vanessa then goes on to begin a relationship with Charity Dingle. Vanessa prepares to marry Charity, however, it is cancelled because Charity's son Ryan Stocks (James Moore) was locked into a shed by Graham Foster (Andrew Scarborough). Vanessa and Johnny are taken hostage by Pierce Harris (Jonathon Wrather) and are imprisoned for weeks, she then learns that she has developed stage 3 bowel cancer. Three months later, Vanessa leaves the village to stay with her mother. While Vanessa is away, she ends her relationship with Charity after discovering Charity kissed Mackenzie Boyd (Lawrence Robb). A few months later, Vanessa returns to stay with her sister Tracy Metcalfe (Amy Walsh) over the New Year period. On arrival, Vanessa witnesses Charity telling Mackenzie she loves him.

== Archie Breckle ==
Archie Breckle
- Emmerdale character
- Portrayed by: Aadam Wahab Shahzad and Liyana Shahza (2012–2015); Kai Assi (2019–present)
- Duration: 2012–2015, 2019–present
- First appearance: Episode 6421; 13 December 2012
- Introduced by: Steve Frost
In-universe information
- Father: Jai Sharma
- Mother: Rachel Breckle
- Stepmother: Laurel Thomas
- Half-sisters: Mia Macey; Eliza Macey
- Grandfathers: Rishi Sharma (adoptive); Amit Sharma
- Grandmothers: Georgia Sharma
- Uncles: Nikhil Sharma (adoptive); Suni Sharma
- Aunts: Priya Sharma (adoptive); Nisha Sharma; Ali Spencer
- First cousins: Sean Spencer; Amelia Spencer; Molly Sharma; Amba Metcalfe
- Other relatives: Esther Spencer

Archie Breckle, originally played by Aadam Wahab Shahzad and Liyana Shahzad is Rachel Breckle (Gemma Oaten) and Jai Sharma's (Chris Bisson) son. He was born prematurely and had to stay in a NICU. He lives with Rachel and the Dingle's. Jai's wife Charity (Emma Atkins) was suspicious about how close Jai and Archie were so Jai's father Rishi (Bhasker Patel) told Charity that he was the father of Archie. Charity later discovers that Jai fathered Archie, not Rishi, and their marriage breaks down.

Archie leaves the village with Rachel in January 2014. Jai hires a private detective to try to find Rachel and Archie, but he is unsuccessful. Archie returned to the village in November without his mother Rachel when his father Jai pays a mystery man money to bring his son back to the village. However, in January 2015, Rachel returns and claims that she has had Archie all along which means that the baby that Jai and his wife Megan Macey (Gaynor Faye) were given was in fact not Archie. A custody battle began for Archie, with Jai gaining custody until the hearing. However, at the hearing, Archie was awarded to Rachel. The following week, Rachel decided to move to Liverpool with her sister Ali (Kelli Hollis), taking Archie with them.

In 2019 Archie returns, now played by Kai Assi, as Rachel dies. Archie is given to Jai by his uncle Dan Spencer (Liam Fox) but at first, Archie won't talk until his step-brother Arthur Thomas (Alfie Clarke) talks about video games, which encourages him to start talking. Since his return, Archie has lived with Jai, his partner, and later wife, Laurel Thomas (Charlotte Bellamy), and her two children Arthur and Dotty Thomas (Tilly-Rue Foster). However, in 2022, Jai and Laurel split up for a while, so Archie moved in with his grandfather, Rishi alongside Jai. When Jai and Lauren reconciled, Archie didn't want to move out of his grandfather's home as he didn't want Rishi to be alone.

== Dominic Andrews ==
Dominic Andrews
- Emmerdale character
- Portrayed by: Wil Johnson
- Duration: 2012–2014
- First appearance: Episode 6435; 27 December 2012
- Last appearance: Episode 6894; 13 June 2014
- Introduced by: Steve Frost
In-universe information
- Occupation: Courier
- Daughters: Gemma Andrews

Dominic "Dom" Andrews, played by Wil Johnson, made his first screen appearance on 27 December 2012. The character and Johnson's casting was announced on 25 October 2012. The actor stated "I can't wait to get started. I am looking forward to an exciting journey. I've been told anything could happen with my character." Dominic is a mechanic and the father of a teenage daughter, Gemma (Tendai Rinomhota). He is "still finding his feet as a single dad." On 23 February 2014, it was announced Johnson had decided to leave Emmerdale. The actor commented "I've had a wonderful time playing Dom Andrews but, like with most things, you have to know when it's time to leave the building, hopefully on a high note. I'm fortunate to be leaving the show off the back of a gripping storyline which I hope the audience will appreciate and have empathy for." Dom's departure occurred as part of a storyline involving the death of Gemma and he departed on 13 June 2014.

Immediately upon his arrival, Dom has a one-night stand with Debbie Dingle (Charley Webb), but learns that she simply wants information on his boss Pete, who does regular drugs runs. Dom's daughter, Gemma, discovers she is pregnant after a one-night stand with Sean Spencer (Luke Roskell). Gemma is not happy when her father begins dating Alicia Metcalfe (Natalie Anderson). Gemma tells Dom that she is not feeling well and he allows her to stay off school. While looking through the rubbish, Dom discovers a pregnancy test and rages at Gemma. The argument spills into the street, but Alicia claims the pregnancy test is hers. Alicia and Gemma go off to talk. When they return, Gemma runs upstairs, while Dom confronts Alicia and ends their relationship. Gemma later tells Dom that she is pregnant and Dom supports her when she chooses to have an abortion. Belle Dingle (Eden Taylor-Draper) decides to get revenge on Gemma for sleeping with Sean and writes about her abortion on a school whiteboard, causing a fight. Dom goes round to the Dingles' cottage and vows that he is not going to rest until Belle is expelled.

Dom remains outside The Woolpack when Cameron Murray (Dominic Power) holds several people hostage inside at gunpoint. David Metcalfe (Matthew Wolfenden) later emerges, carrying Alicia who has been shot by a stray bullet and goes with Dom in the ambulance to the hospital. At this point, Dom and Alicia had reconciled but Alicia being shot made David realise that he is in love with her. Declan Macey (Jason Merrells) makes Dom and Gemma homeless after evicting them from their house which he owned, following a fire at Home Farm. Dom gets extremely angry with Declan but he and Gemma move in with Vanessa Woodfield (Michelle Hardwick).

Gemma, Belle and Sean go to a party which, unknown to them, Dom is DJing at. After the party, Dom begins to get close to new vicar Harriet Finch (Katherine Dow Blyton), and finally kisses her. He thinks Gemma is at a sleepover with Belle, but unknown to him, she is unconscious after a fight with Belle (caused by the fact that both girls like Sean) and Gemma fell, hitting her head on a rock. Although a remorseful Belle offered to help her, Gemma refused and stormed off, before collapsing. Dom rushes to the hospital with Vanessa and Harriet when Harriet and Zak found Gemma and Dom sits by her bedside. When Zak and Dan arrive, Dom is told Gemma may have a brain haemorrhage. He pushes everyone away until Belle, Sean and Lisa arrive and Dom is told that Gemma is braindead, devastating everyone. Dom must decide whether or not to turn off her machines and Zak tells Dom about when Butch died, as the nurses push Dom for answers about organ donation. After listening to Zak, Dom decides to donate Gemma's organs although her brain isn't available. Dom cries, as Gemma is wheeled away to the operating room. Dom returns home and barely talks to anyone. Belle visits, bringing a scrapbook of photos and quotes about Gemma made by the school, which he is very happy about and proud of. In late March, without Dom knowing, Belle tells Zak that she believes she is responsible for Gemma's death and Zak takes her to the police station to confess. Belle is charged with murder and Zak visits Dom. Dom is devastated and confused, demanding he be allowed to visit Belle and confront her. He punches Zak in the face and Zak tells him to take it out on him rather than Belle. The following week, Cain visits and tells him that Belle plans to plead guilty. Dom gets very angry, accusing the Dingles of harassing him and tells Cain that he hopes Belle rots. Dom's mood improves when he is sent a considerable amount of money anonymously. Initially, Dom thinks Vanessa is responsible but she tells him it wasn't her. Dom then thinks it was Betty Eagleton (Paula Tilbrook) and kisses her in the café as a means of saying thank you but Harriet is convinced it wasn't her as it isn't in her nature. Later, Harriet realises that it was Edna Birch (Shirley Stelfox) who sent the money, which she had won on a scratch card that Sandy Thomas (Freddie Jones) gave her for her birthday. Edna had previously been against claiming the money, as she is a devout Christian and believes gambling is sinful, but makes an exception to help Dom. At Belle's trial, he tells the judge that he does not want her sent down for murder after realising it was an accident. Dom departs from the village with his money and goes to live in London where his brothers and nephews live.

== Gemma Andrews ==
Gemma Andrews
- Emmerdale character
- Portrayed by: Tendai Rinomhota
- Duration: 2012–2015
- First appearance: Episode 6436; 28 December 2012
- Last appearance: Episode 7081; 15 January 2015
- Introduced by: Steve Frost
In-universe information
- Father: Dominic Andrews

Gemma Andrews, played by Tendai Rinomhota, made her first screen appearance on 28 December 2012. The character and Rinomhota's casting was announced on 25 October 2012. Gemma is the "wayward" teenage daughter of Dominic (Wil Johnson). She is best friends with Belle Dingle (Eden Taylor-Draper). On 23 January 2014, Sophie Dainty from Digital Spy reported that the character would be killed off as part of a "shocking" storyline, which would see Belle kill Gemma during an argument. She made her final appearance on 4 March 2014, after she dies in hospital.

Gemma discovers she is pregnant, after spending the night with Sean Spencer (Luke Roskell). Gemma is not happy when her father begins dating Alicia Metcalfe (Natalie Anderson). She reveals to Dom that she is not feeling too good so he allows her to stop off school. While looking through the rubbish for something, Dom discovers a pregnancy test kit and rages at Gemma. The argument spills into the street, but when Alicia arrives, she tells Dom that the pregnancy test is hers. Alicia then has a heart to heart with Gemma, and she reveals to a stunned Alicia that she is in fact pregnant, and does not know what to do. Alicia advises Gemma to tell her father, but Gemma seems terrified of doing so. She then confides in Alicia about her mother and how she ran out on her and Dom. When they return, Gemma runs upstairs, while Dom confronts Alicia. He then ends the relationship, devastating Alicia. Upset of what happened between Sean and Gemma, Belle decides to get her own back so at school she writes about Gemma's abortion on one of the school's whiteboards this causes a fight between the two but the fight is broken up by their headmaster who has Belle suspended.

Gemma starts to feel jealous over Belle and Sean getting closer and storms out of a party. Belle tries to reason with her but Gemma calls her a selfish cow and a rubbish friend. Belle retorts that Sean would not be interested in her, so Gemma slaps her. Belle retaliates by pushing her to the ground. She hits her head on a rock and starts bleeding. Belle storms off, leaving Gemma alone. As she walks home, Gemma collapses to the ground, unconscious. A day later, she is found by Harriet Finch (Katherine Dow Blyton) and immediately rushed to hospital. The doctors tell Dom that Gemma has a subarachnoid hemorrhage and has severe brain damage and tells him that Gemma is brain dead. Dom is told that there is nothing that they can do for Gemma and her life support machine is switched off, and she dies. The rest of her organs are not damaged and are donated, Gemma's funeral was held on 13 March 2014 and she is cremated. Dom later scatters her ashes.

On 15 January 2015, Gemma's voice is heard on a voice-over in Belle's mind, as she instructs Belle to run down her father, Zak Dingle (Steve Halliwell), in Katie Sugden's (Sammy Winward) car, but Belle breaks down and stops the car. Zak and Lisa take Belle home and they discover she has been hearing Gemma's voice in her head for over several weeks.

== Other characters ==
Date(s)	Character	Actor	Circumstances
9 April	Doctor Barrett	Lena Kaur	Doctor Barrett attends Zak Dingle (Steve Halliwell) after he collapses in the Woolpack. After examining him, she asks him if he is having trouble at home. She diagnoses a panic attack and he discharges himself against her medical advice.
11–12 April	Luke	Ben Gerrard	Megan Macey (Gaynor Faye) talks to Luke in a bar and takes him to sit with Chas (Lucy Pargeter) and Charity Sharma (Emma Atkins). Charity invites Luke to accompany them to the Woolpack. Luke and Chas have drinks together, which makes Cameron Murray (Dominic Power) jealous. Luke visits Chas the next day and asks her out for dinner. She refuses and admits that she is involved with someone else.
11–13 May	Dr Stamford	Rebecca Grant	When Zak Dingle (Steve Halliwell) is brought into hospital, he is referred to Dr Stamford. She is a psychiatrist and questions Cain Dingle (Jeff Hordley) about Zak's state of mind. She assesses Zak and informs the Dingle family that Zak has been sectioned.
2 May–12 July	Nigel Townsend	Andonis Anthony	Nigel and Davey are loan sharks, who come looking for Zak Dingle (Steve Halliwell). They tell his wife, Lisa (Jane Cox), that Zak borrowed money from them and they want repaying.
2 May–12 July	Davey Aldred	James Lauren	Nigel and Davey are loan sharks, who come looking for Zak Dingle (Steve Halliwell). They tell his wife, Lisa (Jane Cox), that Zak borrowed money from them and they want repaying.
14 May–10 July	Trevor Cunningham	Justin McDonald	Trevor is a nurse who cares for Zak Dingle (Steve Halliwell) after he is sectioned.
4 June–5 July	Talia Brice	Carolynne Poole	Talia is Justin Gallagher's (Andrew Langtree) fiancée. She accompanies Justin on a visit to see his son, Jacob (Joe-Warren Plant), and ex-wife, Alicia (Natalie Anderson).
17 July	Chris Fletcher	Michael Taylor	Chris is Kerry Wyatt's (Laura Norton) boyfriend. He meets Amy Wyatt (Chelsea Halfpenny) while on a night out with Kerry, and he kisses her. However, Kerry pulls them apart and hits Amy in the face, and then starts hitting Chris for cheating on her.
18 October–13 December	DI Drake	David Fleeshman	DC Shawcross and DI Drake are the detectives investigating the murder of Carl King (Tom Lister).
18 October–13 December	DC Shawcross	Ryan Early	DC Shawcross and DI Drake are the detectives investigating the murder of Carl King (Tom Lister).
20 November–5 December	Brett Harrison	Gideon Turner	Brett is a locum vet hired by Paddy Kirk (Dominic Brunt) and Rhona Goskirk (Zoe Henry). When Brett tries to kiss Rhona, she tells him that he has to leave. Paddy later confronts Brett and sacks him.
31 December – 31 January 2013	Luke Salter	Daniel Pearson	Luke is a teenage boy who meets Belle Dingle (Eden Taylor-Draper) at a New Year's Eve party.
