= Rinomhota =

Rinomhota is a surname. Notable people with the name include:

- Andy Rinomhota (born 1997), professional wrestler
- Tendai Rinomhota (born 1997 or 1998), British actress
