= Tendai Rinomhota =

British actress (born 1997 or 1998)

- Born: 1997 or 1998 (age 27–28)
- Education: Arts Educational Schools
- Occupation: Actress
- Years active: 2012–present
- Television: Emmerdale

Tendai Rinomhota (born 1997/1998) is a British actress. From 2012 to 2015, she played Gemma Andrews on the British soap opera Emmerdale, one of the soap's first regular black characters. After the character was killed off, Rinomhota trained in musical theatre at the Arts Educational Schools and performed in various productions there. After graduating with a BA Honours degree, she had roles in the stage productions of The Prince and the Pauper, Grease the Musical, Playboy of the West Indies and Cinderella. In 2023, Rinomhota moved to Australia after being cast in the ensemble of the musical Tina. She has also appeared in the stage production of Annie and the workshop The Children's Inquiry.

== Life and career ==
Tendai Rinomhota was born in 1997 or 1998. She started her acting career by performing in various theatre productions, including playing an orphan in Annie at the West Yorkshire Playhouse. In October 2012, it was announced that Rinomhota had joined the cast of the British soap opera Emmerdale as Gemma Andrews. Her casting was announced alongside that of Wil Johnson, who portrayed Gemma's father Dominic Andrews, in addition to the casting of Michelle Hardwick and Tom Mannion, who debuted as Vanessa Woodfield and Steve Harland, respectively. The Andrews were the second family of regular black characters to appear on Emmerdale. Rinomhota's first appearance as Gemma aired in December 2012. In January 2014, it was announced that she would be leaving the soap in a storyline that saw Gemma be accidentally killed by her best friend Belle Dingle (Eden Taylor-Draper) as part of a "life-changing" storyline for Belle and her family. Gemma was killed off later that year and her death created storylines for Dom, Belle and her family. Samantha Teasdale from Leeds Live opined that Gemma's exit was one of the soap's most memorable deaths. The character briefly returned in a storyline where Belle struggles with her mental health and hears Gemma's voice, with Rinomhota's final appearance as Gemma airing in 2015.

After leaving Emmerdale, Rinomhota trained in musical theatre at the Arts Educational Schools and graduated with a BA Honours degree from there. She then returned to theatre, performing in various plays at Arts Educational Schools, including their productions of Hotel House, Cry Baby and Once on This Island. Rinomhota then played the Pauper in the stage adaptation of The Prince and the Pauper, which ran from 14 November 2019 to 4 January 2020 at the Watermill Theatre. Judi Herman from WhatsOnStage.com praised Rinomhota's "sweet" voice in the production and called her character "wonderfully appealing and resourceful". Giles Woodforde from The Oxford Times also praised Rinomhota's "particularly attractive singing voice" in addition to her character.

In May 2021, it was announced that Rinomhota would play Rizzo in the UK tour of the musical Grease the Musical. The production had been due to tour in 2020 but it was postponed due to the COVID-19 pandemic. The musical toured in various locations in the UK between 30 July and 27 November 2021. In the summer of 2022, Rinomhota had a role in the production of Playboy of the West Indies at the Birmingham Repertory Theatre, which was presented by the Birmingham 2022 Festival. Later that year, she played Amanza in the pantomime Cinderella, set in Ancient Egypt, which ran at the Theatre Royal Stratford East's production from 19 November 2022 to 7 January 2023; the production was livestreamed and available online to local hospices, hospitals and care homes. Rinomhota also played Anjelica in The Children's Inquiry, a workshop produced by LUNG Theatre.

In 2023, it was announced that Rinomhota had joined the cast of the Australian production of the jukebox musical Tina. She was part of the production's ensemble. She had various make-up looks in the production, including one where she was made to look like an old woman. Rinomhota moved to Australia for the production and announced that she would be there for the next two years.

== Acting credits ==
=== Filmography ===
Year	Title	Role	Notes	Ref.
2012–15	Emmerdale	Gemma Andrews	Regular role	

=== Stage credits ===
Year	Production	Role	Venue(s)	Ref.
Unknown	Annie	Orphan	West Yorkshire Playhouse	
Unknown	Hotel House	Kori	Arts Educational Schools	
Unknown	Cry Baby	Radio girl/ensemble	Arts Educational Schools	
Unknown	Once on This Island	Mama Euralie	Arts Educational Schools	
2019–20	The Prince and the Pauper	The Pauper	Watermill Theatre	
2021	Grease the Musical	Rizzo	Various	
2022	Playboy of the West Indies	Schoolgirl Iris	Birmingham Repertory Theatre	
2022–23	Cinderella	Amanza	Theatre Royal Stratford East	
Since c. 2023	Tina	Ensemble	—N/a	
