= Charity Dingle =

Fictional character from Emmerdale

- Emmerdale character
- Emma Atkins as Charity Dingle (2015)
- Portrayed by: Emma Atkins; Mica Proctor (2018 flashback)
- Duration: 2000–2005, 2009–present
- First appearance: Episode 2674; 30 March 2000
- Introduced by: Keith Richardson (2000); Steve Frost (2009)
- Spin-off appearances: Emmerdale: The Dingles, For Richer for Poorer (2010)
- Crossover appearances: Corriedale (2026)
In-universe information
- Other names: Charity Tate; Charity Sharma; Charity Macey
- Occupation: Career criminal; Prostitute; Secretary; Businesswoman; Haulage driver; Packer; Estate manager; Pub landlady; Barmaid
- Father: Obadiah Dingle
- Mother: Kathleen Dingle
- Husband: Chris Tate (2001–2003); Jai Sharma (2012–2014); Declan Macey (2014–2015); Mackenzie Boyd (2023–present)
- Sons: Ryan Stocks; Noah Dingle; Moses Dingle
- Daughters: Debbie Dingle; Leyla Sugden
- Adoptive sons: Johnny Woodfield
- Stepsons: Joe Tate; Archie Breckle; Reuben Harris
- Grandsons: Oscar Grisham; Jack Sugden
- Granddaughters: Sarah Sugden
- Grandfathers: Bert Dingle
- Grandmothers: Jessie Dingle
- Uncles: Elvis Dingle; Solomon Dingle
- Other relatives: Zak Dingle; Shadrach Dingle; Chas Dingle; Gennie Walker; Marlon Dingle; Eli Dingle; Cain Dingle; Sam Dingle; Butch Dingle; Tina Dingle; Mandy Dingle; Belle Dingle; Aaron Dingle; Molly Sharma; Leo Goskirk; Kyle Dingle; Isaac Dingle; Nate Robinson; Eve Dingle; Frankie Robinson; April Windsor; Samson Dingle; Vinny Dingle; Esther Spencer

Charity Dingle (also Tate, Sharma and Macey) is a fictional character from the British ITV soap opera Emmerdale, played by Emma Atkins. Suranne Jones originally auditioned for the role of Charity prior to Atkins being cast in the role. The actress began filming her first scenes in February 2000, and she made her first screen appearance as Charity during the episode broadcast on 30 March 2000. Actress Mica Proctor played a young Charity in a flashback episode about the character's past, which aired on 29 May 2018.

The character has been involved in numerous high-profile storylines during her time on the show, such as her marriage to Chris Tate (Peter Amory), an affair with Chris's sister, Zoe Tate (Leah Bracknell), the arrival of her long-lost daughter Debbie Dingle (Charley Webb), her affair with Cain Dingle (Jeff Hordley), being framed by Chris for his death, giving birth to Noah Tate (Jack Downham) and her relationship with Tom King (Ken Farrington), which led to her temporary exit on 1 March 2005. Atkins returned to the role on 1 October 2009. During her second stint in Emmerdale, Charity's storylines focused on her relationship with Cain, their get-rich-quick schemes, and her job working with Jai Sharma (Chris Bisson), whom she later married and divorced.

Charity later married Declan Macey (Jason Merrells) and had a secret abortion, which led Declan to try to kill her. Atkins took maternity leave in February 2015, as Charity was sentenced to prison after confessing to her crimes. Atkins returned briefly from June to July, and again in December that year, before making a permanent return in March 2016.

Charity's storylines since then have seen her give birth to Moses Dingle, begin a relationship with Vanessa Woodfield (Michelle Hardwick), to whom she later got engaged, and reveal that she was sexually abused by detective Mark Bails (Rocky Marshall) when she was a teenager, which led to the birth of their son Ryan Stocks (James Moore). More recent storylines have seen Charity split from Vanessa, become temporarily estranged from her family, start a relationship with Mackenzie Boyd (Lawrence Robb), whom she later marries, discovering that Mackenzie is the father of Chloe Harris' (Jessie Elland) baby, surviving a car crash alongside Mackenzie and Chloe and shooting and killing Damon "Harry" Harris (Robert Beck) after he kidnaps Mackenzie. For her portrayal of Charity, Atkins has received nominations for Best Actress at the British Soap Awards.

== Casting ==
Charity as she appeared in her first episode (2000)

Actress Suranne Jones auditioned for the role of Charity, however it was Atkins who was eventually cast. The actress received the part while she was in her final year of a performing arts degree at Salford University. Her agent asked her if she wanted to audition for a role as a Dingle in Emmerdale and Atkins wondered whether she would be able to portray a member of that family, as she is so removed from those types of characters. The actress told Merle Brown of the Daily Record that the more her agent told her about the role, the more she thought she would enjoy playing it. Atkins attended the audition and was later recalled to do a screen test alongside Mark Charnock (who plays Marlon Dingle). Two weeks later, Atkins was told she had won the role of Charity. She began filming her scenes in February 2000 and made her first appearance in March.

On 26 July 2004, Kris Green of Digital Spy reported Atkins had quit Emmerdale, claiming that it was time to move on. Of her decision to leave, Atkins said "I will be desperately sad to say goodbye to everyone but there are so many other roles that I would like to try and it's important to me that Charity leaves on a high." Atkins made her on screen departure on 1 March 2005.

On 18 March 2009, it was announced Atkins would be returning to Emmerdale as part of the ongoing overhaul of the show by series producer, Gavin Blyth. Of her decision to reprise her role, Atkins said: "Charity is a wonderfully complex character and an absolute joy to play. I couldn't resist the opportunity to explore a new era of Charity, Cain and Debbie and will relish seeing what she's been up to since we saw her last." Charity and her five-year-old son returned on 1 October 2009. Two months later, Digital Spy's Kris Green reported Atkins had signed a six-month extension to her contract, keeping her with the show well into 2010.

On 20 January 2015, Atkins confirmed that she would be taking maternity leave from the show. Charity was written out of Emmerdale after receiving a prison sentence for perverting the course of justice. After a few brief returns throughout the rest of 2015, Charity returned permanently on 10 March 2016 when she was eventually released from prison.

== Development ==
=== Characterisation ===
"Charity is a blunt, no-nonsense woman and knows how to get what she wants – mostly by flirting. She's self-sufficient, self-serving and will happily step over people, including her daughter Debbie, to reach her goal. However, she is trying to be a better mother. She's also determined to better herself but it's money that drives her."

— itv.com on Charity

During a 2001 interview with the Daily Mirror's Nina Myskow, Atkins said she loved playing Charity as she is a ballsy wild child who is not scared of anything. Atkins commented that her character is everything she is not. Myskow agreed with Atkins and said the actress is nothing like Charity, who she called a "loud-mouthed bad girl." Writing for the Daily Record, Merle Brown deemed Charity a "brassy tart with a heart." Atkins told him Charity is very argumentative, flirty and a bitch, which makes her "a brilliant character to play." Atkins said there are many different sides to Charity that she hoped viewers would get to see as she developed. Tessa Cunningham of the Daily Mirror branded Charity a "manipulative gold-digger." Of Charity's style, Atkins said "She's a lady of the night – looks like a slapper, a complete slapper. I wouldn't have it any other way. I get to wear short mini-skirts and things I'd never dream of wearing. Going shopping with the costume people is brilliant fun, because it's like: "Oh God, that's so bad. Yeah, we'll have it." Atkins added Charity does not have to open her mouth as her outfits say everything for her.

Three years after her introduction, Atkins revealed Charity had developed into a "bigger, fiestier and more business-oriented" woman. The actress said she had grown into the character and hoped she would remain cheeky, mischievous and a tart with a heart. Atkins added Charity is playful, but not evil or corrupt. A writer for the Western Mail called Charity "mad, bad and dangerous to know." In February 2011, Atkins said Charity cannot resist an element of risk to anything because it is exciting to her and it makes village life more exciting too. Atkins explained that Charity is the sort of person who does not know why she is in a village like Emmerdale, as she has "much bigger fish to fry" elsewhere.

=== Relationship with Chris Tate and affair with Zoe Tate ===
Charity begins an "unlikely relationship" with wheelchair-using, local millionaire, Chris Tate (Peter Amory). Charity realises she likes Chris when she becomes involved with his businesses. Charity thinks he is sweet and they get on well. When Chris suspects Charity is cheating on him, her flirtatious habits do little to reassure him. Charity denies Chris's accusations that she is seeing somebody else. Atkins told Claire Brand of Inside Soap "Charity has been trying to convince Chris that nothing is going on. She's been having blazing rows with him and saying 'How could you possibly accuse me?' She's making him feel really guilty about suspecting her and he ends up wallowing in self pity, thinking he's blown it with her." Atkins went on to say Charity is very clever and makes Chris do what she says, as opposed to the other way round, which Chris is used to. Charity flirts with many of the men in the village to make Chris jealous. Chris decides to trap Charity and invites all the major suspects – Marlon Dingle, Scott Windsor (Ben Freeman) and Rodney Blackstock (Patrick Mower) – to an important party Charity is helping to organise. Atkins said viewers would be surprised to find out who Charity is seeing behind Chris's back.

Charity's secret lover was revealed to be Chris's sister, Zoe (Leah Bracknell), during a special hour-long episode. Atkins explained the storyline was a shock to her as she had always thought Charity was "a man's woman." However, the more she thought about it, the more she realised the story made sense. Atkins explained "Charity lives on the edge. She's certainly not gay, but she loves sex and it doesn't matter whether it's with a man or a woman." Atkins said Charity likes to play games and she finds the idea of an affair with Chris's sister exciting. The actress did not think the storyline was "sensationalist" and reckoned Charity is probably bisexual and was only just realising that through her relationship with Zoe. Charity eventually ends the relationship with Zoe and goes on to marry Chris, despite admitting she does not love him and his money is the big attraction. Atkins said Charity is honest, but she does have feelings for Chris, which would grow. She added the lesbian affair had run its course, but she thought there might be repercussions from it in the future.

== Storylines ==
=== 2000–2005 ===
Charity comes to Emmerdale for her cousin, Butch's (Paul Loughran) funeral. It emerges that she is working as a prostitute and there is a warrant out for her arrest. Charity stays with Zak Dingle (Steve Halliwell) and his wife Lisa (Jane Cox).

Charity begins dating Chris Tate (Peter Amory), which his sister, Zoe (Leah Bracknell), is unhappy about and offers her money to end it but Charity refuses. Zoe and Charity then have an affair but Charity ends it when Zoe gets too possessive. Chris proposes marriage and Charity accepts so Zoe records Charity talking about their affair and blackmails her to sign a prenuptial agreement. However, Charity tells Chris about her affair and Chris forgives her, tearing up the pre-nup and Zoe moves out. Chris and Charity marry and Charity helps Chris run his business empire.

Chris and Charity eventually realise that Zoe is ill and she has to be sectioned. While in hospital, she is diagnosed with schizophrenia. Charity supports Zoe when she realizes she is pregnant and considers giving the baby up for adoption, revealing she had a baby girl that she put up for adoption. Charity is shocked when Paddy (Dominic Brunt) and Emily Kirk's (Kate McGregor) foster daughter, Debbie Jones (Charley Webb), realises that Charity is her birth mother. Charity initially refuses contact with Debbie but comforts her when her mother dies. Despite her reserve, she and Debbie bond so Charity files for custody and wins, much to Paddy and Emily's dismay. Charity is delighted when Chris and Debbie bond and he suggests adopting her. Cain later realizes that he is Debbie's father and bonds with his daughter, leading him and Charity to begin an affair. Chris sees them and throws her out. A month later, Charity goes to Home Farm to discuss her marriage, hoping they will reconcile. However, Chris knows that he has an inoperable brain tumour and frames Charity for his murder, before committing suicide. The police arrest Charity after finding her fingerprints on Chris's glass and her signature on an order for poison. She and Cain blame each other so Charity is released on bail when she learns that she is pregnant and moves in with Marlon. After getting drunk, they sleep together. Charity realises Zoe knows that Chris killed himself and kisses her but Zoe testifies that Charity killed Chris so Charity is found guilty and sentenced to life imprisonment. While in prison, she gives birth to a son who she names Noah (Alfie Mortimer). Unsure of Noah's paternity, she arranges for Zoe, Cain and Marlon to do a DNA test and the results show that Chris is Noah's father. Charity strikes a deal with Zoe – she can have custody of Noah in return for £20,000 and evidence that Chris committed suicide. Zoe agrees and Charity is released. Zoe refuses to allow Charity any contact with Noah, who she calls Christopher, and plans to adopt him but permission is refused, due to already having 2 children (Chris's eldest son, Joseph (Oliver Young), and her daughter, Jean (Megan Pearson), running Home Farm and her mental health issues. Social Services ask Charity to decide if she wants to raise him or put him up for adoption elsewhere. She chooses to raise him and Zoe returns him to Charity.

Charity sets her sights on Tom King (Ken Farrington) and gets a job as his secretary. Tom's daughter-in-law, Sadie King (Patsy Kensit), takes an instant dislike to Charity and tries to sabotage the plan. Unfortunately this does not work and Sadie is forced to accept that Charity is Tom's new partner. Eventually Tom proposes and Charity accepts but Sadie refuses to accept this and hires Cain to kiss Charity in front of a photographer and shows the pictures to Tom. He calls the wedding off, leaving Charity furious. Knowing Sadie is responsible, they fight before she returns to the Dingles. In revenge, Charity has an affair with Jimmy King (Nick Miles), Sadie's husband, looking for something she can use against Sadie. She is thrilled when Jimmy tells her that although he thought they were trying for a baby, she is still having contraceptive injections. Charity records Jimmy talking about this and her plan to set Charity up. Initially, she simply blackmails Jimmy but then plays the video at a party and Tom throws them out before begging her to give him another chance but she refuses, saying that she no longer loves him and leaves with Noah.

=== 2009–present ===
Charity is shocked to see Cain and Debbie at her wedding to Michael Conway (Jamie Belman) and Debbie's news that she and Michael were having an affair. Cain tells Michael that Charity used to be a prostitute and Michael leaves Charity at the altar. Charity reveals that she knew Michael was having doubts and told him that she was pregnant to stop him leaving. Michael is told, very clearly, to choose either Charity or Debbie. He chooses Debbie but she ignores him, choosing to spend time with Charity and Noah. Debbie invites Charity and Noah to move in with her, which they do.

From family gossip, Charity learns that Cain stole money from the Kings and teams up with Carl King (Tom Lister) to get it back. She reconciles with Cain and learns that the money is kept in a storage unit. She takes the money but changes her mind but Cain and Debbie catch her. Cain gives Charity the money and leaves the village. Charity moves in with Marlon and tries to give Debbie the money but she refuses so Charity donates it to the church but Debbie retrieves it. Cain returns and he and Charity agree to be civil. During an argument, Debbie sets fire to the money and realizing they have nothing left to argue about, Charity proposes to Cain and he accepts. Cain organises a surprise wedding and Chas Dingle (Lucy Pargeter) brings Charity to the registry office. Charity is surprised but will not marry Cain, telling him that she loves him but is not ready to settle down yet.

Charity and Cain start stealing cars to make money after Charity steals a businessman's keys after flirting with him at a local hotel. However, the second time they try this, they learn that their target, Declan Macey (Jason Merrells), knows people in the village and spots Charity. Declan tells her that he will not go to the police if she returns the car and has a drink with him.

Charity helps Chas get revenge on Carl for cheating on her and begins working for Jai Sharma (Chris Bisson). Charity advises Jai on the restoration of the barn next to the Dingle farm. Jai pays Charity to persuade Lisa to sell the farm and move to Hotten, but Lisa refuses. Cain is jealous of Charity and Jai's relationship and warns Jai to stay away. Jai buys Charity a new car and takes her to a hotel but she insists they have separate rooms. Charity ends things with Cain after learning that he slept with Faye Lamb (Kim Thomson), thinking that she had slept with Jai. Charity and Noah move in with Jai and Nikhil (Rik Makarem), at Holdgate Farm. Charity and Jai begin dating and Cain tries to win Charity back but Charity tells him that she is not interested. Charity tries to make Nikhil look incompetent, wanting his job, so Jai throws her out. Charity apologises and proposes to Jai. He initially refuses but later accepts. Charity, Cain and Cameron Murray (Dominic Power) steal the Kings' haulage trucks and sell them. Refusing to accept Charity is with Jai, Cain starts attacking the Sharmas forcing them to call off their wedding when the threats become more severe. Cain is attacked and Charity is questioned by the police but she insists she did not do it. Charity and Jai reconcile and she supports him when he is charged with assaulting Cain. Charity reveals she found Cain the night he was attacked and walked away. Cain changes his statement and the charges against Jai are dropped. Charity is late for her wedding as she visits Debbie but does marry Jai. Charity tells Jai that she does not want any more children, leaving him disappointed but he suggests that he adopt Noah. Charity disapproves, worried the about the effect it will have on Noah if the marriage failed, so they compromise and change his surname to Sharma. Later, Jai has a drunken one-night stand with Rachel Breckle (Gemma Oaten) and Charity has a one-night stand with Declan and admits it immediately. Jai forgives her as he feels guilty about his own indiscretion, knowing that Rachel is pregnant and later has a son, Archie. Charity becomes suspicious so Jai's father, Rishi, claims to be Archie's father to save Jai's marriage and ensure that Jai can spend time with Archie. However, Charity realizes the truth when Jai overreacts to an injury Archie sustains in an accident with a sparkler and ends the marriage, moving in with Debbie and her children.

Charity sees Declan attempting to commit suicide by burning down Home Farm, unaware that his sister Megan (Gaynor Faye) is inside. Charity persuades Declan to frame her cousin, Sam, so that they can split the insurance money and deprive Jai of his son, thinking Sam, Rachel and the children would go on the run but Rachel refused, insisting that they clear their names. Before Sam's court date, Charity tells Rachel that she and Declan framed Sam and Rachel can clear his name by giving a statement to the police, admitting that she started the fire or Sam will go to prison. Unwilling to see Sam go down, Rachel does as Charity and Declan ask and tells the police that she was the arsonist. When she gets bail, Charity and Declan give her everything she will need to start a new life with Archie. Rachel's sister, Ali, knows that Rachel is innocent but keeps quiet after Charity and Declan threaten her daughter.

Charity and Declan then start dating but no one thinks it will last. Charity realizes she is pregnant in April and plans to have a termination, feeling that she and Declan couldn't cope with a child. However, Declan finds out when Megan finds the positive test in the bin at Debbie's house. He is happy and proposes to her, making her walk out. Later, Charity accepts Declan's proposal and Declan announces their engagement in The Woolpack and Charity's pregnancy, just as Jai walks in. Charity later decides to go ahead with a termination and offloads to her consultant, bursting into tears and telling her how she gave Debbie up for adoption. However, after booking an abortion, she finds that Declan has told Noah about the baby. Charity marries Declan with only Noah, Megan and Declan's nephew, Robbie Lawson (Jamie Shelton), present. Megan tries to sabotage the wedding and sets off the fire alarm. Charity realizes what Megan is up to and a catfight broke out. She panics when Declan reveals he has booked a month's holiday to Barbados for them and Noah as she worries over how to have her abortion. However, a confrontation with Megan a few days later gives Charity an opportunity to feign miscarriage when she is accidentally knocked to the floor. A scan at the hospital confirms she has lost the baby, leaving Declan devastated. Wracked with guilt, Megan tells Declan that she is resigning and will not move into Home Farm but Jai advises her to test Charity's intentions. Charity is shaken when Megan says she may stay after all and is horrified to find Megan telling Declan that she caused the miscarriage. Enraged, Declan throws Megan out. Charity, relieved, agrees to rearrange a late honeymoon for them and Noah, but insists it is too soon for another baby, much to Declan's chagrin. A vengeful Megan then decides to spy on Charity with Nicola at Home Farm. After returning from Barbados, Charity agrees to try for another baby.

When Declan finds out about Charity's abortion, he keeps quiet and takes her away for a romantic break but tries to kill her, hitting her with a mallet and tries to shoot her with a flare gun. However, Declan accidentally shoots Robbie, when he tries to save Charity and later dies from the blast. Declan tries to drown Charity by pulling her into the lake but she hits him over the head with an anchor and he sinks into the water. Charity then passes out on the boat, stating "You were never a match for me", while Megan watches. Charity is extremely paranoid when she returns to the village and manages to patch things up with Megan before Robbie's funeral. Declan later returns and drugs Charity, while holding Megan, Jai, Cain, Debbie, Sam, Zak, Chas and Ashley hostage at the Sharma house. He tells them how Charity framed Rachel for the fire at Home Farm, before leaving the village. The Dingles and Jai then confront a bitter Charity, who eventually confesses. When they turn on her, Charity retaliates that they are all hypocrites and that she no longer wants to be part of the family. Zak promptly disowns her before leaving with Chas and Sam, who expresses his hatred towards Charity. Jai leaves too, but not before vowing to make Charity suffer for what she did to him. Debbie and Cain reveal their disgust and, despite Charity's pleas, walk away. When trying to leave, Charity is attacked and kidnapped by an unknown culprit and held in a shipping container in the woods. It was later revealed that the kidnapper is Jai. He tells Charity that unless she reveals Rachel and Archie's location, she will be left to die. While arguing with Sam about Rachel's whereabouts, Jai falls down the stairs and falls into a coma, but reveals where Charity is. Sam goes to the shipping container and hears Charity stating that she only cares about herself and should care more about Debbie and Noah. Sam leaves Charity there but eventually tells Cain where Charity is and he and Sam save her. To redeem herself to her family, Charity drives off with Maxine (Rebecca Manley), a woman who is blackmailing Cain's wife, Moira. She drives extremely fast down narrow country lanes and threatens to kill her if she gives Moira any more grief. Moira worries that Charity has made things worse, while Cain is proud of Charity's actions.

Charity, meanwhile, is found guilty for perverting the course of justice and is sentenced to two years in prison. When Cain takes Noah to visit Charity in prison, she tells him that she has a plan in the works that might help her get early release. Charity goes into labour while Debbie is there, unaware that Charity is pregnant. She gives birth to a baby boy and hands him to a social worker, telling them Debbie is the legal guardian until she is released from prison. Knowing that Charity confessed her love for Cain after her imprisonment, Debbie and Chas suspect that Cain is the father, which he denies. He visits Charity in prison and demands to know who the father is, otherwise he will sever all contact but she refuses to divulge the father's identity so Cain walks out. The Dingles name the baby Moses. Charity calls the father, Ross Barton (Michael Parr), when Moses is rushed to hospital and needs an operation. Soon after, Cain tells Debbie that Ross is Moses's father, to stop her leaving the village with him. After Charity is released from prison, she steals a Ferrari. When she gets it stuck in a field, she needs Cain and Moira's help to avoid the police. She later becomes the new owner of The Woolpack.

Cain and Moira's marriage breaks down and he kisses Charity. Cain saves Charity from a drug dealer, after she tries to find Belle, who has gone missing. Cain and Charity have sex in the garage, and he stands up for her in front of Zak and Lisa. They continue dating, and plan to leave the village to stay with Debbie in France. However, Cain changes his mind, as he still loves Moira, so Charity fakes her suicide by crashing his car in a quarry.

Charity develops a relationship with Vanessa Woodfield (Michelle Hardwick). She later tells her that when she was 14 years old, she was repeatedly raped by policeman Mark Bails (Rocky Marshall). He also physically attacked her on several occasions and even used to pimp her out to other men. When she fell pregnant, she started drinking heavily to induce a miscarriage. Eventually, Charity went into labour while escaping Bails' clutches and gave birth to a baby boy in hospital, however, he had to be rushed away as he was not breathing. As the doctors tried to bring him back, Charity watched on and, convinced he was dead, she ran out of the hospital. After reporting Bails to the police, Charity learns that her baby survived and he is called Ryan Stocks (James Moore). She soon works out that he was adopted by Irene Stocks (Amy Alexander/Eithne Browne), the midwife that helped deliver him.

== Reception ==
For her portrayal of Charity, Atkins was nominated in the categories of Best Actress, Best Exit and Best Single Episode (for her wedding with Tom) at the 2005 British Soap Awards. In 2010, Atkins was nominated for the Best Actress award. The following year she and Hordley received a nomination for Best On-Screen Partnership. The character was selected as one of the "top 100 British soap characters" by industry experts for a poll to be run by What's on TV, with readers able to vote for their favourite character to discover "Who is Soap's greatest Legend?"

Kris Green of Digital Spy called Charity "one of the soap's most controversial characters." Steve Hendry of the Sunday Mail branded the Charity, Chris and Zoe storyline as "one of soapland's more bizarre love triangles." A writer for Virgin Media named Cain and Charity one of "Soaps' sexiest couples." Laura Morgan of All About Soap said that viewers should not count on Charity settling into married life with Jai, especially with Cain hanging around "like a bad smell". A Sunday Mail reporter dubbed Charity "one of the great British soap villains".

Charity's sentencing in January 2015 was named one of "the best bits of January" in the Inside Soap Yearbook 2016. In August 2017, Atkins was longlisted for Best Bad Girl at the Inside Soap Awards. Despite making the viewer-voted shortlist, Atkins did not win the award. For her portrayal of Charity, Atkins was nominated for Best Soap Actor (Female) at the 2018 Digital Spy Reader Awards; she came in second place with 17.2% of the toal vote. The storyline "Charity fights for justice against DI Bails" was also nominated at the awards under the "Best Soap Storyline" category; it came in third place with 14% of the total vote. Charity's pairing with Vanessa was also nominated for Best Soap Couple; they came in fourth place with 9.4% of the total vote. Atkins was also longlisted for "Best Actress" at the 2025 Inside Soap Awards.

In 2019, Atkins received a National Television Awards nomination in the Serial Drama Performance category for her portrayal of Charity. In a 2021 Radio Times poll, Charity was voted as the "best soap pub landlord of all time", receiving 30% of the votes, which Atkins thought was a "surprise" but left her "humble and happy".

== See also ==
- List of LGBT characters in soap operas
- List of soap opera villains
