= Clocking Off =

British television drama series

- BBC Store download cover art
- Genre: Drama
- Created by: Paul Abbott
- Written by: Paul Abbott; Danny Brocklehurst; Jan McVerry; John Fay
- Starring: Jack Deam; Christopher Eccleston; Siobhan Finneran; Philip Glenister; Joan Kempson; Steve Jackson; Wil Johnson; Sarah Lancashire; Jason Merrells; Tony Mooney; Paul Oldham; Diane Parish; Jason Sampson; Lesley Sharp; Andrew Sheridan; John Simm; Christine Tremarco; William Ash; Susan Cookson; Paul Copley; Lindsey Coulson; Ben Crompton; Ashley Jensen; Alison Swann; Ricky Tomlinson; Alice Barry; Katie Blake; Emma Cunniffe; Sharon Duce; Craig Kelly; Katisha Kenyon; Marshall Lancaster; Lisa Millett; David Morrissey; James Murray; Sophie Okonedo; Robert Pugh; Nick Sidi; Nicola Stephenson; Steven Williams; Paula Wolfenden; Keith Barron; Mark Benton; Sushil Chudasama; Pam Ferris; Branka Katić; Derek Riddell
- Theme music composer: Murray Gold
- Country of origin: United Kingdom
- Original language: English
- No. of series: 4
- No. of episodes: 27

Production
- Executive producers: Nicola Shindler; Gareth Neame
- Producer: Juliet Charlesworth
- Production location: Manchester
- Running time: 60 minutes
- Production company: Red Production Company

Original release
- Network: BBC One
- Release: 23 January 2000 – 6 April 2003

Clocking Off is a British television drama series which was broadcast on BBC One for four series from 2000 to 2003. It was produced for the BBC by the independent Red Production Company, and created by Paul Abbott.

Effectively an anthology programme that followed the lives of a group of workers at a Manchester textile factory, with each episode focusing on the private life of a different character. Well-known actors and actresses who appeared in the series included Christopher Eccleston, Sophie Okonedo, Philip Glenister, John Simm, Lesley Sharp, Siobhan Finneran, Emma Cunniffe, Diane Parish, David Morrissey, Ricky Tomlinson, Julian Rhind-Tutt, William Ash, Ben Crompton, Jack Deam, Jack P. Shepherd, Tina O'Brien, Jason Merrells, Pam Ferris, Wil Johnson, Ashley Jensen, Susan Cookson, Mark Benton, Lindsey Coulson, Paul Copley, Sarah Lancashire, Crissy Rock, Marshall Lancaster, Marc Warren, Claire Sweeney and Maxine Peake.

The series received high acclaim, winning the British Academy Television Award for Best Drama Series in 2001. However, over the following two years, Abbott's involvement decreased as he pursued other projects. Nonetheless, every series was nominated for a BAFTA and other writers including Danny Brocklehurst, John Fay and Jan McVerry wrote successful standalone episodes. The programme finally ended, after a series with no Abbott scripts at all, in 2003. The BBC said the programme was axed following declining ratings, but Abbott said the programme's demise was down to "a lack of writers able to come up with stories good enough to carry the stand alone episodes."

Twenty-seven episodes were produced across four series, and, in 2004, the first series was released on DVD. In 2015, the first series was released on DVD in Australia and was made available for purchase via the BBC Store.

== Cast ==
Actor	Character	Series			
Actor	Character	1	2	3	4
Jack Deam	Kev Leach	Main	Main	Main	Main
Christopher Eccleston	Jim Calvert	Featured			
Siobhan Finneran	Julie O'Neill	Main	Main	Main	
Philip Glenister	James "Mack" Mackintosh	Main	Main	Main	
Joan Kempson	Freda Wilson	Main	Main	Main	Main
Steve Jackson	Barry Sleight	Main	Main	Main	
Wil Johnson	Steve Robinson	Main	Main	Main	
Sarah Lancashire	Yvonne Kolakowski	Main			
Jason Merrells	Martin Leach	Main	Main		
Tony Mooney	Ade Cameron	Main	Main	Main	Main
Paul Oldham	Brian Pringle	Main	Main		
Diane Parish	Sylvia Robinson	Main	Main		
Jason Sampson	Jake Robinson	Main			
Lesley Sharp	Trudy Graham	Main	Main		
Andrew Sheridan	"KT"	Featured			
John Simm	Stuart Leach	Featured			
Christine Tremarco	Katherine Mackintosh	Main			
William Ash	Nick Anderson		Main	Main	
Susan Cookson	Janice Piper	Guest	Featured		
Paul Copley	Mal Aindow		Featured		
Lindsey Coulson	Bev Aindow		Main		
Ben Crompton	Barney Watson		Main	Main	Main
Ashley Jensen	Babs Leach		Featured	Guest	Featured
Alison Swann	Sue Leach	Recurring	Featured		
Ricky Tomlinson	Ronnie Anderson		Main		
Alice Barry	Peggy Hargreaves	Guest		Main	
Katie Blake	Tasha Roscoe			Featured	
Emma Cunniffe	Kim Anderson			Main	
Sharon Duce	Vicky Sullivan			Main	
Craig Kelly	Eddie Mackintosh			Featured	
Katisha Kenyon	Hannah Phillips			Main	Main
Marshall Lancaster	Gary Dugdale			Main	Main
Lisa Millett	Grace Eastwood			Main	Main
David Morrissey	Franny Rothwell			Featured	
James Murray	Mark Talbot			Main	
Sophie Okonedo	Jenny Wood			Main	
Robert Pugh	Alan Preston			Main	
Nick Sidi	Sam Davidson			Featured	Guest
Nicola Stephenson	Suzie Davidson			Main	Main
Steven Williams	Ryan Davidson			Main	Main
Paula Wolfenden	Jackie O'Farrell			Main	Main
Keith Barron	Roy Fletcher				Main
Mark Benton	Colin Wilkes				Main
Sushil Chudasama	Faz Usmani				Main
Pam Ferris	Pat Fletcher				Main
Branka Katić	Maya Lazarevic				Featured
Derek Riddell	Jamie Campbell				Main

== Episodes ==
=== Series overview ===
Series	Episodes	Originally released	
Series	Episodes	First released	Last released
1	6	23 January 2000	27 February 2000
2	7	2 April 2001	21 May 2001
3	8	31 January 2002	21 March 2002
4	6	2 March 2003	6 April 2003

=== Series 1 (2000) ===
No.	Title	Directed by	Written by	Original release date	UK viewers (millions)
1	"The Leaches' Story"	John Strickland	Paul Abbott	23 January 2000	9.40
Family man Stuart Leach (John Simm) turns up after disappearing thirteen months previously, claiming he has no memory of the events of his disappearance. His brother, Martin (Jason Merrells) struggles to come to terms with his brother's reappearance, but soon sets about finding out exactly what happened to his sibling.
2	"Yvonne's Story"	Geoffrey Sax	Paul Abbott	30 January 2000	8.12
Machinist Yvonne (Sarah Lancashire) is angered when she is thrown out of the house where she is living with her partner. But her decision to burn the house down threatens to end in tragedy as she is unaware that her three young children are sleeping upstairs.
3	"KT's Story"	John Strickland	Paul Abbott	6 February 2000	8.17
KT (Andrew Sheridan) finds himself being seduced by Katherine (Christine Tremarco), the wife of factory owner Mack (Philip Glenister).
4	"Steve's Story"	Geoffrey Sax	Paul Abbott	13 February 2000	7.01
Steve (Wil Johnson) tries to patch things up with his wife, Sylvia (Diane Parish), after being unfaithful to her. But on the night of their wedding anniversary, they are targeted by an armed burglar, and the police seem more determined to victimise them than catch the perpetrator.
5	"Trudy's Story"	Sarah Harding	Paul Abbott	20 February 2000	8.40
Trudy (Lesley Sharp) is devastated when her father dies following a long-term illness. Deciding to change her life for the better, she opts to have plastic surgery, but the trauma of the surgery leads her to accidentally reveal Katherine's affair with KT.
6	"Katherine and Mack's Story"	Sarah Harding	Paul Abbott	27 February 2000	8.22
Mack and Katherine's marriage finally hits breaking point, and in an attempt to sever all ties, Katherine asks Mack to buy the factory building from her or risk losing it to his biggest competitor. With a 200% rent rise on the cards, Mack realises it could be make or break for the factory.

=== Series 2 (2001) ===
No.	Title	Directed by	Written by	Original release date	UK viewers (millions)
1	"Kev's Story"	Ashley Pearce	Paul Abbott	2 April 2001	6.24
Kev (Jack Deam) is initially pleased when workmate Brian (Paul Oldham) moves in across the street. But when Kev inadvertently captures video footage of Brian looking at images of children on the internet, he begins to wonder if his old friend could actually be a paedophile.
2	"Bev's Story"	Ashley Pearce	Jan McVerry	9 April 2001	6.41
Bev (Lindsey Coulson), a lonely single mother working part time as a machinist, becomes attracted to Mal (Paul Copley), a service technician. But as their relationship grows, and she moves in with his two children, relations begin to become strained, and Bev is forced to fake a pregnancy to keep Mal on side.
3	"Freda's Story"	Tom Shankland	Paul Abbott	23 April 2001	6.82
Freda (Joan Kempson) is struggling to balance her job with looking after her grandchildren, but is helped along the way by both financial and emotional support from her friend and colleague, Julie. She seeks out their long-lost father, Tony (Jonathan Wrather), but he refuses to provide any help. But when Tony is later arrested on a drugs charge, he sees the children as a way of avoiding jail – and kidnaps them.
4	"Barry's Story"	Tom Shankland	John Fay	30 April 2001	5.62
Barry (Steve Jackson) is elated when he collects a windfall sum of £20,000 from a bet on the football pools. Trudy (Lesley Sharp)'s sister Janice (Susan Cookson) takes an immediate shine to Barry, and they agree to go out on a date – but Trudy is convinced that Janice can only be after one thing.
5	"Ronnie's Story"	Tom Shankland	Danny Brocklehurst	7 May 2001	6.62
Factory truck driver Ronnie (Ricky Tomlinson) organises the hijack of his own lorry in order to secure compensation to fund the care of wife, Jess (Kate Fitzgerald), who suffers from MS. As he prepares to flee with lover Trish, the police catch up with one of the robbers, and Ronnie's plan threatens to be found out.
6	"The Lads' Story"	Omar Madha	Paul Abbott	14 May 2001	6.86
Ade (Tony Mooney), Barney (Ben Crompton), Kev (Jack Deam) and Nick (William Ash) are caught up in a brawl with a group of drunks, during which, someone is knifed. When the story makes the morning news, the lads begin to wonder which of them could have been responsible.
7	"Martin's Story"	Omar Madha	Paul Abbott	21 May 2001	6.28
Martin (Jason Merrells) decides to set up on his own, taking over the haulage department as an independent contractor. His relationship with Trudy (Lesley Sharp) is also coming on leaps and bounds, much to Mack's furious jealousy, until his former sister-in-law, Sue, turns up – eight months pregnant – claiming that he is the father.

=== Series 3 (2002) ===
No.	Title	Directed by	Written by	Original release date	UK viewers (millions)
1	"Franny's Story"	Nigel Douglas	Paul Abbott	31 January 2002	5.96
Factory cook Franny (David Morrissey) is distraught when his troubled sister Terri commits suicide. Following her death, he discovers that she had a child several years ago who is now in foster care. He sets about finding her father, Jason (Marc Warren), but after he refuses to become involved, Franny decides to adopt the child himself.
2	"Tasha's Story"	John Duthie	Jan McVerry	7 February 2002	4.74
Tasha (Katie Blake), a textiles design student, tries to become one of the girls – but is alienated when she tries to offer them cocaine. Mack, however, is excited by eager young Tash and the pair soon strike up a relationship. But their night of passion leads Tasha into make a shocking decision.
3	"Mark's Story"	Nigel Douglas	Matt Greenhalgh	14 February 2002	4.79
Mark (James Murray)'s first day at the factory goes off without a hitch – until he is picked up by the police. Soon, his new workmates discover that his past is not quite what he seems, and that he is hiding some deadly secrets.
4	"Julie's Story"	John Duthie	Danny Brocklehurst	21 February 2002	N/A
Julie (Siobhan Finneran) is offered a shock proposal by her older brother Robert (Phil Cornwell) – fly out to live with him and his family in Hong Kong. But despite being desperate to change her life, Julie is drawn to new factory worker Vicky (Sharon Duce), and the pair seem to strike it off.
5	"Jenny's Story"	Nigel Douglas	Danny Brocklehurst	28 February 2002	N/A
Forklift driver Jenny (Sophie Okonedo) is preparing to marry Sam (Nick Sidi), brother of her best friend Suzie (Nicola Stephenson). But when heating contractor Neil (Sean Gallagher) turns up at the factory, he corners Jenny and threatens her in front of her colleagues, unaware that Neil is her former brother-in-law, and that Jenny holds an entirely secret past that none of her friends know about.
6	"Alan's Story"	David Jackson	Peter Bowker	7 March 2002	N/A
Alan (Robert Pugh)'s decision to have a vasectomy unveils a shocking secret – that he has a rare condition meaning that he has been infertile since birth. Subsequently, he realises that his two teenage sons – including Chris (Ciaran Griffiths) – cannot be his own.
7	"Gary's Story"	David Jackson	Paul Abbott	14 March 2002	4.62
Gary (Marshall Lancaster) receives a letter claiming he has been left money in his father's will – but as far as he knows, his father is alive and well. He soon discovers that he and his brother Stephen (Lee Ingleby) were adopted. But his shock turns to distraction when he becomes the victim of a series of unexplained events.
8	"Mack's Story"	David Jackson	John Fay	21 March 2002	N/A
Mack's continued run of bad luck hits breaking point when the arrival of his brother, Eddie (Craig Kelly), causes problems at work. The increasing pressure from the workforce following a flu epidemic, and the demands of his new girlfriend Miranda (Katy Carmichael), prove to be Mack's undoing. Can he hold on to his beloved factory?

=== Series 4 (2003) ===
No.	Title	Directed by	Written by	Original release date	UK viewers (millions)
1	"Suzie's Story"	Brian Grant	Danny Brocklehurst	2 March 2003	5.46
Suzie (Nicola Stephenson) ditches her husband-to-be at the altar, claiming that she has slept with her old flame, bad boy Stuart (Hugo Speer). But the situation causes tensions in the workplace, and the increasing strain on her father Charlie's (Tony Haygarth) health leads to tragedy.
2	"Pat's Story"	Brian Percival	Danny Brocklehurst	9 March 2003	N/A
Pat (Pam Ferris) takes on the mountainous task of getting the workforce on side following Mack's departure. But her success at work becomes plagued by problems at home, as she is forced to face up to the problems caused by her husband Roy (Keith Barron), a compulsive gambler and alcoholic, when the bailiffs arrive.
3	"Maya's Story"	Brian Grant	Bill Gallagher	16 March 2003	N/A
When Maya (Branka Katić) accidentally hits Kev (Jack Deam) with her car, he finds himself suffering from epileptic fits, and is no longer able to drive or operate machinery. Maya, stricken with guilt, finds herself drawn into Kev's downward spiral.
4	"Colin's Story"	Brian Grant	Richard Zajdlic	23 March 2003	N/A
Colin (Mark Benton) attacks a nurse who has been bullying his mentally ill brother Mark at the care home where he lives. But the police start to believe that Mark is to blame for leaving the man in a coma, Colin is forced to face his demons and come clean.
5	"Grace and Faz's Story"	Brian Grant	John Fay	30 March 2003	N/A
Grace (Lisa Millett) finds herself attracted to Faz (Sushil Chudasama), but Faz's father does not approve of his son mixing with his white co-workers. Grace's father Dave (Tom Georgeson) is furious at the thought of his daughter having a mixed-race relationship, and decides to take matters into his own hands.
6	"Freda and Pat's Story"	Brian Percival	Richard Zajdlic	6 April 2003	N/A
Freda (Joan Kempson) has recently been promoted to supervisor and found love with builder Kenny, but when she feels slighted by Pat (Pam Ferris), she starts a malicious campaign against the factory manager that spirals out of control.
