= Babyfather =

- Genre: Drama
- Written by: Avril E Russell; Patrick Augustus; Sharon Foster
- Directed by: Alrick Riley; Roberto Bangura
- Starring: Heshima Thompson; Earl Cameron; Sandra Bee; Tameka Empson
- Country of origin: United Kingdom
- Original language: English
- No. of series: 2
- No. of episodes: 12

Production
- Running time: 40 min (8 episodes); 50 min (4 episodes)

Original release
- Network: BBC Two
- Release: 10 October 2001 – 18 December 2002

Babyfather is a BBC Two television programme which aired in the UK in 2001 and 2002. The show has been described as a "black, male, UK version of Sex and the City". It ran for two series, and was based on a novel written by Patrick Augustus. The writers of the screenplay include Avril E. Russell, Sharon Foster, and Roy Williams.

== Cast ==
The show is set around four central characters:

- Augustus 'Gus' Pottinger – David Harewood
- Johnny Lindo – Don Gilet
- Linvall – Fraser James
- Beres – Wil Johnson
