= Wil Johnson =

British actor

- Born: Wilbert Charles Johnson; 18 April 1965 (age 61); London, England
- Education: Mountview Academy of Theatre Arts (BA)
- Years active: 1985–present
- Known for: Waking the Dead; Babyfather; Emmerdale; Waterloo Road
- Children: 6

Wilbert Charles Johnson (born 18 April 1965) is an English actor, who has had notable television roles in Waking the Dead and Babyfather, and on stage in Othello. He played Dom Andrews in Emmerdale from 2012 to 2014.

== Early life ==
Johnson was born to Jamaican parents in Muswell Hill, London and raised in Tottenham. His mother invested in stocks and his father worked for UPS. Johnson had no interest in music while he was in primary school, but after he filled in a role for an absent drummer, he changed his mind.

He went to Mountview Drama School in Crouch End, London. He also joined another drama group at the Haringey Theatre. He also went to a dance group and learned ballet, contemporary dancing, and break dancing, which he performed for about seven years. He also attended National Youth Theatre for three years.

== Career ==
Johnson's first professional acting role came in the play Four Seasons at the 1985 Edinburgh Festival Fringe. For the rest of the 1980s he made minor appearances in television series such as Casualty and London's Burning, before playing detective Stevie Johnson in the London Weekend Television series Anna Lee. From 1994 to 1995 he played the supporting role of Detective Constable Michael Skelton in Cracker.

In 2000, he appeared in the BBC One television pilot Waking the Dead, as Detective Sergeant Spencer Jordan, a member of a specialised police unit tasked with investigating "cold cases". Waking the Dead returned for a complete series in 2001, and Johnson was a main cast member until the series ended in 2011. From 2000 to 2002, he appeared as Steve Robinson in Paul Abbott's popular drama series Clocking Off. From 2001 to 2002, he appeared as a main cast member in two series of the BBC's Babyfather.

In 2004, Johnson played the title character in the Royal Lyceum Theatre Company's Othello.

He also played Marcus Kirby in the BBC One school-based drama Waterloo Road. He departed in the second half of the series.

In 2010, he appeared in In a Better World (film) as 'Dr. Najeeb'.

He also performed in a play, called The Swallowing Dark at the Liverpool Playhouse and Theatre503. In 2011, he also starred as gangster boss Big Mike in Anuvahood and in 2008 as Big Man in Adulthood.

In November 2011, Johnson appeared as 'Sean Dolan' a Consultant paediatrician in BBC One's Holby City.

In 2012, it was announced that Johnson would be joining Emmerdale as single father Dominic "Dom" Andrews in the later part of the year. On 23 February 2014, it was announced that he would be leaving the show later that year following the death of his character's daughter, Gemma (Tendai Rinomhota).

In 2013, he appeared as a gangster in a film thriller called Life Outside. He also was a special guest DJ at a 'MonologueSlam' event (actors showcase) at 'The Green Carnation' cocktail lounge, Soho.

In 2013, he also co-produced with Christian Ashaiku a film called Disorientated Generation (about a Nigerian man living in London). The film was partially funded by Enfield Council, with a small grant from UK Film Council. The film was originally shot in 2006.

In 2016, Johnson was cast as the Earl of Kent in the Talawa Theatre Company and Royal Exchange Manchester co-production of King Lear. Johnson received praise for his performance, with The Guardian writing "giving depth to straight simplicity" and the Manchester Theatre Awards saying that "... wrongest servant Kent is played with passion and often with humour by Wil Johnson".

In 2016, Johnson received the British Urban Film Festival honorary award from fellow actor Charles Venn for 30+ years outstanding contribution to film and television. Johnson played the role of Uncle Brod in the 2018 revival of Leave Taking by Winsome Pinnock at the Bush Theatre.

He is an advocate of colour-blind casting in British television:

There are a lot more black and Asian actors who the nation knows by name, which is fantastic [...] [Colour-blind casting] happens regularly in theatre, but in mainstream television it could be implemented a lot more. I'm tentative to use the word 'stereotyping', because a lot of the black roles emerging on television I wouldn't categorise as stereotypical: my role in Waking the Dead certainly wasn't.

== Personal life ==
Johnson has six children. His eldest daughter is composer, singer, songwriter and cellist Ayanna Witter-Johnson.

== Filmography ==
=== Film ===
Year	Film	Role	Notes
1996	Go West Young Man		Short film
1998	Babymother	Byron	Television film
1999	A Woman Scorned	The Man	Short film
1999	Native	Tyrone	Short film
2001	South West 9	Freddy	
2001	Buried Treasure	Luke	Television film
2002	f2point8	Rob	Short film
2003	Emotional Backgammon	John	
2004	Yes	Virgil	
2005	Franklin Haywire	Paul	Short film
2007	Deadmeat	Barry	
2008	Adulthood	Big Man	
2009	Stick with Me		Short film
2009	Colour Blind	Dan	Short film
2009	Disoriented Generation	Ishmael	
2010	Pimp	Byron	
2010	In a Better World	Najeeb	
2011	Anuvahood	Mike	
2011	Washed Up	Mitchell Barloe	Television film
2012	Hard Shoulder	Carl Foster	
2012	Throw of a Dice	Duncan Beckford	
2012	Black Smoke Rising	Simon	
2012	Amina	Dr. Johnson	
2013	Fedz	Trevor McBride	
2013	Sokorates	Sokorates	Short film
2013	Killing All the Flies	Jonathan Edwards	Television film
2013	Dumar	Emmerson	
2014	M.O.N.E.Y	Floyd Bennett	
2017	Rabbit Punch	Trav	Short film
2017	This Is Axiom	Glenn	Short film
2018	Brixton Rock	Mr. Massey	Short film
2019	The Strangers	Mr. Fitzgerald	
2019	Bad Day	Paul	Short film
2020	Transference	Dad	Short film
2021	Breathe	Trevor	Television film
2021	The Half You Hate	Director	Short film
2021	The Track	Nate	Short film
2022	Revelations	Thom	Short film
2024	Tell No Lies	Detective Wright	
2024	He Who Dares to Win	Davey	Short film

=== Television ===
Year	Television	Role	Notes
1987	Casualty	Paul	Episode: "The Raid"
1988	London's Burning	Junior	Episode: "Series 1, Episode 1"
1988	ScreenPlay	Dekko	Episode: "Home Front"
1989	Dramarama	Kevin	Episode: "Snap Decision"
1989	Starting Out	Leo Young	Recurring role; 4 episodes
1990	The Bill	Dom Reeves	Episode: "Burnside Knew My Father"
1993	Mr Don & Mr George		Episode: "There's Been a Thing"
1994	The Bill	Carl Paston	Episode: "Dirty Laundry"
1994	Anna Lee	Stevie Johnson	Recurring role; 5 episodes
1994–1995	Cracker	Skelton	Recurring role; 10 episodes
1995	The Bill	Thomas Gadiki	Episode: "Neutral Territory"
1997	The Bill	Billy Elizee	Episode: "Solid Evidence"
2000–2002	Clocking Off	Steve Robinson	Recurring role; 14 episodes
2000–2011	Waking the Dead	Spencer Jordan	Series regular; 92 episodes
2001	Babyfather	Beres	Episode: "Series 1, Episode 1"
2010	Dispatches	Narrator	Episode: "Gun Nation"
2010–2011	Waterloo Road	Marcus Kirby	Series regular; 10 episodes
2011–2013	Holby City	Sean Dolan	Recurring role; 5 episodes
2012–2014	Emmerdale	Dominic Andrews	Series regular; 129 episodes
2014	Moving On	Peter Jackson	Episode: "Two Brothers"
2015	Lewis	Dax Kinneson	Episode: "Magnum Opus"
2016	The Five	Young Ray	Miniseries; 4 episodes
2016	Hollyoaks	Lionel Albright	Recurring role; 2 episodes
2017	Hetty Feather	Charlie	Episode: "Cannon Fodder"
2017–2020	Outlander	Joe Abernathy	Recurring role; 5 episodes
2018	Vera	Gary Whenchurch	Episode: "Darkwater"
2019	Carnival Row	Puck Butcher	Episode: "Aisling"
2021	Death in Paradise	Emmet Peterson	Episode: "I'll Never Let You Go"
2021	The Larkins	Old Reg	Recurring role; 5 episodes
2022	House of the Dragon	Ser Vaemond Velaryon	Recurring role; 4 episodes
2023	COBRA	Ben Fanshawe	Recurring role; 2 episodes
