= Michelle Hardwick =

English actress (born 1976)

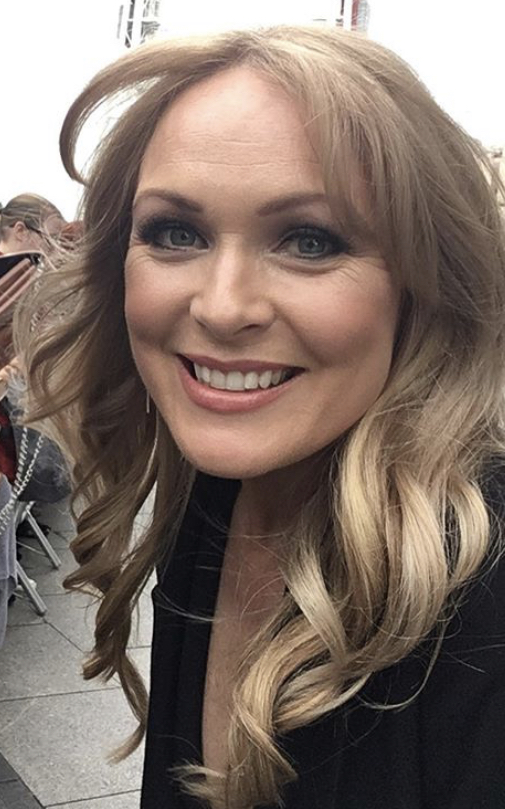
- Hardwick in 2019
- Born: 26 February 1976 (age 50); Wakefield, Yorkshire, England
- Occupation: Actress
- Years active: 1995–present
- Spouses: Rosie Nicholl (m. 2015; div. 2017) Kate Brooks (m. 2019)
- Children: 2

Michelle Hardwick (also known as Michelle Brooks, born 26 February 1976) is an English actress. She is known for her roles as hospital receptionist Lizzie Hopkirk in the ITV drama series The Royal and Vanessa Woodfield in the ITV soap opera Emmerdale.

== Career ==
Born in Wakefield, West Yorkshire, Hardwick studied Performing Arts at Park Lane College and at the Scala Performing Arts school (both in Leeds), following which she has acted in the theatre as well as appearing on television. In 2000, she played the role of Hero in the Northern Broadsides' production of Shakespeare's "Much Ado About Nothing". She has taken notable roles in Heartbeat and Coronation Street. She appeared in three different episodes of the ITV UK TV series Heartbeat (1995 as Sandra in "Toss up"; 2002 as Lesley Sutton in "Coming of Age", which featured the death of character PC Tom Nicholson, played by Ryan Early; and finally in 2003 as Lizzie Hopkirk in "Out of the Blue"). Hardwick appeared in Coronation Street in 1997 as Sheila Dixon and in 1998 as Naomi Russell.

Her biggest role came through her casting as receptionist Lizzie Hopkirk (Kennoway) in ITV UK TV series The Royal. The 1960s-set hospital drama was a spin-off from Heartbeat and soon gathered popularity on its own account. Hardwick's portrayal of the ditzy Lizzie (often referred to as "Dizzy Lizzie") was a firm favourite amongst viewers. Lizzie delivered some very funny lines, including "A woman needs a fish like a man needs a bicycle". In 2012, she had a minor role in Hollyoaks as D.I. Parker, who arrested established character Mitzeee (Rachel Shenton).

In October 2012, it was announced that Hardwick had landed a role in ITV soap Emmerdale. She was to play Rhona's wild friend from college Vanessa Woodfield, who had been tipped to shake up life at the vets' surgery. Vanessa was billed as a "self-assured party girl" who would be "like a breath of fresh air" when she arrived at the vets' practice. Hardwick commented: "As a local girl and a fan of the show, Emmerdale is my dream job. After only two days, I am starting to feel at home already and Vanessa is such a fun character. I can't wait to see what's in store for her."

== Personal life ==
Hardwick came out as lesbian in July 2013, confirming that she was in a long-term relationship with music teacher Rosie Nicholl. The couple became engaged on 31 December 2013, and married on 4 April 2015. In 2017, Hardwick announced they were divorcing.

In October 2018, Hardwick revealed in an Instagram post that she was in a relationship with Emmerdale producer Kate Brooks. She announced the couple's engagement on Twitter in December 2018. They married on 10 September 2019 at Graceland, Memphis, Tennessee, with Hardwick giving birth to their first son Edward Peter Brooks on 9 October 2020. In November 2022, she gave birth to her daughter.

Hardwick has taken part in Race for Life events near her home to raise money for Cancer Research UK. She has spoken about her brother's diagnosis and recovery from skin cancer.

== Awards and nominations ==
Year	Award	Category	Result	Ref.
2013	Inside Soap Awards	Best Newcomer	Nominated	
2014	19th National Television Awards	Newcomer	Nominated	
2018	Inside Soap Awards	Best Partnership (shared with Emma Atkins)	Nominated	
2019	Inside Soap Awards	Best Partnership (shared with Atkins)	Shortlisted	
2020	RadioTimes.com Soap Awards	Best Actress	Nominated	
2020	I Talk Telly Awards	Best Soap Partnership (shared with Atkins)	Nominated	
