= Jamie Shelton =

British actor (born 13 August 1988)

Jamie Shelton (born 13 August 1988) is a British actor, who played Robbie Lawson in the show Emmerdale on ITV soap opera from 2012 to 2014.
