= Emma Atkins =

English actress (born 1975)

- Born: Emma Jayne Atkins; 31 March 1975 (age 51); Morecambe, Lancashire, England
- Occupation: Actress
- Years active: 1999–present
- Known for: Role of Charity Dingle in Emmerdale (2000–2005, 2009–)
- Children: 1

Emma Jayne Atkins (born 31 March 1975) is an English actress, best known for her role as Charity Dingle in the ITV soap opera Emmerdale.

== Early life ==
Atkins grew up in the village of Silverdale, Lancashire, and then went to study at the University of Salford. Atkins' mother worked as a fabric & wallpaper designer under the name of Lilli Atkins.

== Career ==
Atkins is known for portraying the role of Charity Dingle on the ITV soap opera Emmerdale since 2000. After first leaving Emmerdale, Atkins appeared in episodes of the BBC series Dalziel and Pascoe, Mayo, I'm with Stupid, New Street Law, Doctors and Casualty. In 2008 she played Lesley Ashton in Heartbeat series 17 episode 8

On 18 March 2009, it was revealed that Atkins would be returning to Emmerdale, reprising her role of Charity, and she made her reappearance on 1 October 2009. She took a brief break in 2015 when she gave birth to her son, but returned shortly after.

== Awards and nominations ==
Atkins has been nominated for numerous awards for her work on Emmerdale. She was nominated for Best Actress in 2010 and 2018 at the British Soap Awards, and in September 2018, Atkins won Best Soap Actress at the TV Choice Awards. She has also been nominated for several Inside Soap Awards. In October 2018, she was named as the Inside Soap Awards Best Actress, and she was announced as Best Actress at the 2018 Daily Star Soap Awards on 26 December 2018. In January 2019, Atkins was nominated for the National Television Awards in the category of Serial Drama Performance.
