= List of former Emmerdale characters =

This is a list of former characters from the ITV1 soap opera Emmerdale, ordered by the year in which they made their final appearance.

== 1970s ==
=== Last appeared in 1972 ===
Character	Actor(s)	Duration
Alec Saunders	Alan Tucker	1972
Wallace	Michael Culver	1972
Peters	Reginald Barratt	1972
Lynn Wallace	Jenny Lee-Wright	1972
Norman Harrison	Christopher Mitchell	1972

=== Last appeared in 1973 ===
Character	Actor(s)	Duration
Bart Ansett	Trevor Ray	1972–1973
Harry Jameson	John Glyn-Jones	1972–1973
Sharon Crossthwaite	Louise Jameson	1973
PC Dave Ball	Christopher Wray	1972–1973
Ian 'Trash' McIntyre	Leonard Maguire	1973
Beryl Crossthwaite	Joan Scott	1973
Penny Golightly	Louisa Martin	1973
Peggy Skilbeck	Jo Kendall	1972–1973
Amy Postlethwaite	Dorothy Frere	1973
Bob Molesworth	Reginald Marsh	1973
Mick Cavan	David Kelly	1973
Carol Benfield	Ann Holloway	1973
Charlie Nelson	Jack Woolgar	1973
Andrew Watson	Malcolm Terris	1973
Clare Scott	Joanna Tope	1973
Ben Dowton	Larry Noble	1973
Laura Verney	Patricia Haines	1973

=== Last appeared in 1974 ===
Character	Actor(s)	Duration
Frank Blakey	Eric Allan	1972–1974
Lewis Potter	Robert Dorning	1974
Ethel Ainsworth	Peggy Marshall	1974
Letty Brewer	Diana Davies	1974
Franklin Prescott	Donald Morley	1974
Dryden Hogben	Roy Boyd	1974
Briddy Middleton	Jenny Hanley	1974
Alison Gibbons	Carolyn Moody	1973–1974
George Verney	Patrick Holt	1973–1974

=== Last appeared in 1975 ===
Character	Actor(s)	Duration
Tom Raistrick	Leonard Trolley	1975
Wilf Padgett	George Waring	1974–1975
Jean Kendall	Leslie Nunnerley	1975
Jim Gimbel	John Atkinson	1974–1975
Freda Gimbel	Mary Henry	1974–1975
Jackson	William Moore	1975
Tom	Bert Palmer	1975
Beattie Dowton	Barbara Ogilvie	1973–1975
Sarah Foster	Patricia Brake	1975

=== Last appeared in 1976 ===
Character	Actor(s)	Duration
Sam Skilbeck	Jamie Bell	1973–1976
Sally Skilbeck	Justine Bell	1973–1976
Lena Dawkins	Lorraine Peters	1973–1976
Will Croft	William Simons	1976
Julie Croft	Gwyneth Powell	1976
Heather Bannerman	Wanda Ventham	1976
Martin Gimbel	George Fenton	1976
Rosemary Kendall	Lesley Manville	1975–1976
Christine Sharp	Angela Cheyne	1973–1974, 1976
Nan Wheeler	Anna Cropper	1976
Dick Robertshaw	Alan David	1974, 1976
Robert Sharp	Bernard Kay	1974, 1976

=== Last appeared in 1977 ===
Character	Actor(s)	Duration
Janet Thompson	Muriel Pavlow	1977
Asta Gunnarson	Madeleine Hinde	1977
Olaf Gunnarson	Jürgen Andersen	1977
Lucy Stubbs	Adrienne Frank	1977
Kathy Gimbel	Polly Hemingway	1974–1977
Syd Harker	Andy Bradford	1977
Sarah Oswell	Virginia Moore	1977
Ray Oswell	Stuart Bevan	1977
David Cowper	John Abbott	1977
Angela Read	Joanne Whalley	1977

=== Last appeared in 1978 ===
Character	Actor(s)	Duration
Glenda Thompson	Elaine Donnelly	1978
Ruth Hepton	Stephanie Turner	1978
Ian Hepton	Tim Preece	1978
Steve Hawker	Paul Rosebury	1978
Paul Pargrave	Philip Madoc	1978
Barney	George Malpas	1972–1976, 1978
Antony Moeketsi	Oscar James	1978
Phyllis Purwick	Jean Heywood	1978
Pip Coulter	Julie Dawn Cole	1978
Charlotte Verney	Angela Thorne	1978
Gerald Verney	James Kerry	1978
David Annersley	David Markham	1978
Major Vivian Denyer	Kevin Stoney	1978

=== Last appeared in 1979 ===
Character	Actor(s)	Duration
Arthur Braithwaite	Max Wall	1979
Irene Madden	Kathleen Byron	1979
Phil Fletcher	Kenneth Watson	1979
Terry Fletcher	Bernard Padden	1979
Jimmy Armstrong	Lennox Greaves	1979
Susan Armstrong	Catherine Terris	1979
Ed Hathersage	Paul Maxwell	1979

== 1980s ==
=== Last appeared in 1980 ===
Character	Actor(s)	Duration
Enid Pottle	Anne Dyson	1980
Esmeralda Eckersley	Debbie Farrington	1980
Harold Eckersley	Roger Hammond	1980
Mrs Eckersley	Pam St Clement	1980
Harry Moore	Walter Sparrow	1980
Maurice Westrop	Edward Dentith	1979–1980
Judy Westrop	Jane Cussons	1979–1980
Ted Edwards	Barry Hart	1977–1980
Alice Wilks	Hazel Bainbridge	1980
Angie Norton	Karen Drury	1980

=== Last appeared in 1981 ===
Character	Actor(s)	Duration
Enoch Tolly	Neil McCarthy	1980–1981
Bob Jerome	Richard Howard	1979–1981
Frank Hencoller	Johnny Maxfield	1981
Naomi Tolly	Jenny Tomasin	1980–1981
Hannah Tolly	Alison Ambler	1980–1981
Nellie Ratcliffe	Gabrielle Hunt	1978–1981
Richard Anstey	Carl Rigg	1980–1981
Fred Armstrong	Julian Garlick	1978–1981

=== Last appeared in 1982 ===
Character	Actor(s)	Duration
Grace Tolly	Margaret Stallard	1980–1982
Barry Hill	David Fleeshman	1982
Bill Jeffries	James Aubrey	1982
Jane Hardcastle	Alison Dowling	1981–1982

=== Last appeared in 1983 ===
Character	Actor(s)	Duration
Jessie Renfrew	Kathleen Helme	1978–1979, 1981, 1983
Angie Richards	Beverley Callard	1983
Barbara Peters	Rosie Kerslake	1983
Nicholas Martin	Tony Melody	1983
Edward Ruskin	George Little	1973–1975, 1983
Emily Brearly	Ann Way	1980, 1983

=== Last appeared in 1984 ===
Character	Actor(s)	Duration
Jill Turner	Patricia Maynard	1984
Andy Longthorn	David Clayforth	1980–1984
Andy Longthorn	Mark Botham	1980–1984
Sam Pearson	Toke Townley	1972–1984

=== Last appeared in 1985 ===
Character	Actor(s)	Duration
Sita Sharma	Mamta Kaash	1985
Walter	Meadows White	1972, 1974–1985
Walter	Geoffrey Hooper	1972, 1974–1985
Walter	Al Dixon	1972, 1974–1985

=== Last appeared in 1986 ===
Character	Actor(s)	Duration
Derek Warner	Freddie Fletcher	1980, 1984–1986
Derek Warner	Dennis Blanch	1980, 1984–1986
Meg Armstrong	Ursula Camm	1979–1980, 1983, 1986
Meg Armstrong	Ruth Holden	1979–1980, 1983, 1986
Carol Longthorn	Jane Hollowood	1980, 1986
Carol Longthorn	Jane Cunliffe	1980, 1986
Clifford Longthorn	Jim Barcroft	1980, 1983, 1986
Clifford Longthorn	John Barrett	1980, 1983, 1986
Peggy Longthorn	Dorothy Vernon	1980, 1983, 1986
Karen Moore	Annie Hulley	1984–1986
Janie Harker	Diane Grayson	1972–1974, 1986
Janie Harker	Lesley Duff	1972–1974, 1986
Pat Sugden	Lynn Dalby	1972, 1974, 1980–1986
Pat Sugden	Helen Weir	1972, 1974, 1980–1986
Lesley Pearce	Clare Clifford	1986

=== Last appeared in 1987 ===
Character	Actor(s)	Duration
Graham Lodsworth	Ross Kemp	1986–1987
Paolo Rosetti	Carl Forgione	1987
Francesca Rosetti	Natasha Dilleyston	1987
Hunter Bell	Frederick Bennett	1974, 1987
Mr Metcalfe	Bernard Kay	1987
Lionel Weiss	Wolfe Morris	1987

=== Last appeared in 1988 ===
Character	Actor(s)	Duration
Christopher Meadows	Conrad Phillips	1981–1988
Tom Merrick	David Hill	1972, 1980–1982, 1984–1986, 1988
Tom Merrick	Edward Peel	1972, 1980–1982, 1984–1986, 1988
Tom Merrick	Jack Carr	1972, 1980–1982, 1984–1986, 1988
Ruth Pennington	Julia Chambers	1987–1988
Marian Rosetti	Gail Harrison	1972–1975, 1978, 1987–1988
Marian Rosetti	Debbi Blythe	1972–1975, 1978, 1987–1988
Ezra Brearly	Martin Matthews	1983, 1988
Stephen Fuller	Gregory Floy	1988

=== Last appeared in 1989 ===
Character	Actor(s)	Duration
Phil Pearce	Peter Alexander	1986–1989
Clare Sutcliffe	Sara Griffiths	1988–1989
Tony Barclay	Alun Lewis	1989
Sandie Merrick	Jenny Mayors-Clark	1972, 1980–1989
Sandie Merrick	Jane Hutcheson	1972, 1980–1989
Denis Rigg	Richard Franklin	1988–1989
Ted Sharp	Andy Rashleigh	1989
Jackie Merrick	Ian Sharrock	1972, 1980–1989
Alice Wood	Olivia Jardith	1989
Matt Skilbeck	Frederick Pyne	1972–1989

== 1990s ==
=== Last appeared in 1990 ===
Character	Actor(s)	Duration
Liz MacDonald	Lizzie Mickery	1977, 1984–1986, 1988, 1990
Debbie Wilson	Debbie Arnold	1990
Pete Whiteley	Jim Millea	1989–1990
Bill Whiteley	Teddy Turner	1989–1990
Jock MacDonald	Drew Dawson	1981, 1983–1990
Harriet Buchan	Sheila Grier	1990
Fran Carter	Heather Wright	1990
David Hughes	Martyn Whitby	1989–1990

=== Last appeared in 1991 ===
Character	Actor(s)	Duration
Doreen Shuttleworth	Sandra Gough	1984–1985, 1989, 1991
Miss Skipdale Breweries	Jayne Ashbourne	1991
April Brooks	Anna Keaveney	1991
Paula Barker	Judy Brooke	1991
Martin Bennett	John Pickles	1990–1991
Samuel Skilbeck	Benjamin Whitehead	1982–1991
Tony Charlton	Stephen Rashbrook	1990–1991
Dolly Skilbeck	Katharine Barker	1977–1991
Dolly Skilbeck	Jean Rogers	1977–1991
Kate Sugden	Sally Knyvette	1988–1991
Henry Wilks	Arthur Pentelow	1972–1991
Malcolm Bates	Anthony Schaeffer	1984, 1987–1989, 1991
Malcolm Bates	Tom Adams	1984, 1987–1989, 1991
Louise	Tricia Penrose	1991
Jim Latimer	Miles Reithermann	1973, 1991
Jim Latimer	Dennis Blanch	1973, 1991

=== Last appeared in 1992 ===
Character	Actor(s)	Duration
Gary	Gary Halliday	1990–1992
Charlie Aindow	David Fleeshman	1990–1992
Alex	Guy Scantlebury	1991–1992
Rick	Julian Griffin	1991–1992
Poppy Bruce	Anna Friel	1992
Melanie Clifford	Joanne Woodcock	1992
Dan	Julian Walsh	1990–1992
Lisa	Bryonie Pritchard	1992

=== Last appeared in 1993 ===
Character	Actor(s)	Duration
Bill Middleton	Johnny Caesar	1984–1993
Neil Kincaid	Brian Deacon	1992–1993
Steve Marshal	Gavin Kitchen	1992–1993
Sangeeta Parmar	Razia McGann	1992–1993
Donald Hinton	Hugh Manning	1977–1989, 1993
Jayesh Parmar	John Leary	1992–1993
Carol Nelson	Philomena McDonagh	1991–1993
Lorraine Nelson	Nicola Strong	1992–1993
Julie Bramhope	Ruth Whitehead	1992–1993
Debbie Buttershaw	Rebekah Joy Gilgan	1993
Sgt Ian MacArthur	Martin Dale	1980–1993
Archie Brooks	Tony Pitts	1983–1993
Elizabeth Pollard	Kate Dove	1990–1993

=== Last appeared in 1994 ===
Character	Actor(s)	Duration
Mark Hughes	Craig McKay	1988–1994
Leonard Kempinski	Bernard Archard	1992–1994
Josh Lewis	Peter Warnock	1993–1994
Danny	Lauren Beales	1994
Lucy	Tracie Hart	1994
Shirley Turner	Rachel Davies	1993–1994
Reg Dawson	Niven Boyd	1994
Eileen Pollock	Arbel Jones	1994
Peter Whiteley	Sam Walker	1990–1994
Lynn Whiteley	Fionnuala Ellwood	1989–1994
Sven Olsen	Daniel O'Grady	1994
Ben Dingle	Steve Fury	1994
Joe Sugden	Frazer Hines	1972–1994
Colin Long	Al Hunter Ashton	1994
Sgt Hanway	Ray Ashcroft	1994
Arthur Prendegast	George Malpas	1994
Harry Barker	Harry Beety	1994

=== Last appeared in 1995 ===
Character	Actor(s)	Duration
Bernard McAllister	Brendan Price	1993–1995
Angharad McAllister	Amanda Wenban	1993–1995
Andrew Mackinnon	Michael J. Jackson	1994–1995
Derek Simpson	Garry Cooper	1995
Ronnie Slater	Ian Thompson	1995
Amos Brearly	Ronald Magill	1972–1995
Luke McAllister	Noah Huntley	1993–1995
Jessica McAllister	Camilla Power	1993–1995
WPC Barbara Metcalfe	Lynn Whitehead	1995
DS Harry Metcalfe	Ray Ashcroft	1995
Margaret Adlington	Kathy Jamieson	1995
Daniel Weir	Matthew Marsden	1995
Lady Vanessa Weir	Fleur Chandler	1995
Dolores Sharp	Samantha Hurst	1994–1995
Paula	Alison Swann	1995
Britt Woods	Michelle Holmes	1995

=== Last appeared in 1996 ===
Character	Actor(s)	Duration
Granny Hopwood	Beatrice Kelly	1996
Faye Clarke	Helena Calvert	1996
Susie Wilde	Louise Heaney	1996
Dave Glover	Ian Kelsey	1994–1996

=== Last appeared in 1997 ===
Character	Actor(s)	Duration
Sean Rossi	Mark Cameron	1996–1997
Tom Bainbridge	Jeremy Turner-Welch	1996–1997
John Kenyon	Alan Rothwell	1997
Sandra Fowler	Kate Layden	1996–1997
Frank Tate	Norman Bowler	1989–1997
Anne Cullen	Heather Peace	1997
Ken Adlington	Douglas McFerran	1995–1997
Ken Adlington	David Barrass	1995–1997
Greg Cox	Danny Seward	1997
Charlie Cairns	Sarah Graham	1997
Des Burtenshaw	Tony Barton	1995, 1997
Karen Johnson	Annemarie Lawless	1997
PC Wilson	Steve Huison	1994–1995, 1997
Fiona Mallender	Polly York	1997
Colin Batty	Andrew Livingston	1997
Linda Fowler	Tonicha Jeronimo	1994–1997
Gerald Taylor	Blair Plant	1995–1997
DI Cooke	Susie Baxter	1997
Jo Steadman	Julie Peasgood	1997
Geri Cairns	Georgina Annett	1997
Geri Cairns	Anna Cunningham	1997
Sophie Wright	Jane Cameron	1996–1997
Doug Hamilton	Jay Benedict	1997

=== Last appeared in 1998 ===
Character	Actor(s)	Duration
Barry Clegg	Bernard Wrigley	1997–1998
Lord Alex Oakwell	Rupam Maxwell	1997–1998
Dee Pollard	Claudia Malkovich	1997–1998
Helen Ackroyd	Kathryn Apanowicz	1995, 1997–1998
Tony Cairns	Edward Peel	1997–1998
Becky Cairns	Sarah Neville	1997–1998
Jan Glover	Roberta Kerr	1994–1998
Margaret Cunningham	June Broughton	1998
Jed Outhwaite	Tony Melody	1998
Dean Adlington	Patrick Connolly	1997–1998
Kirsty Hutchinson	Anne-Marie Jowett	1997–1998
Heather Hutchinson	Siobhan Finneran	1998
Emma Cairns	Rebecca Loudonsack	1997–1998
Paulette Lewis	Danielle Brown	1998
Lord Michael Thornfield	Malcolm Stoddard	1998
Chelsea Campbell	Elizabeth Ingram	1998
Vic Windsor	Alun Lewis	1993–1998

=== Last appeared in 1999 ===
Character	Actor(s)	Duration
Will Cairns	Paul Fox	1997–1999
Dawn Wilkins	Rosy Clayton	1999
Jane Barnet	Deborah Chad	1998–1999
Rachel Hughes	Glenda McKay	1988–1999
Caroline Bates	Diana Davies	1984–1997, 1999
Stella Jones	Stephanie Schonfield	1998–1999
Ernie Shuttleworth	John Comer	1975, 1984–1986, 1991, 1998–1999
Ernie Shuttleworth	Peter Schofield	1975, 1984–1986, 1991, 1998–1999
Maggie Cassidy	Juliet Ellis	1999
Nick Bates	Cy Chadwick	1985–1996, 1999
Ezra Dingle	John Henshaw	1999
Liam Hammond	Mark Powley	1999
Gavin Ferris	Robert Beck	1999

== 2000s ==
=== Last appeared in 2000 ===
Character	Actor(s)	Duration
Reggie Wilkie	Leslie Randall	1999–2000
Lyn Hutchinson	Sally Walsh	1997–2000
Graham Clark	Kevin Pallister	1998–2000
Pete Collins	Kirk Smith	1999–2000
Butch Dingle	Paul Loughran	1994–2000
John Wylie	Seamus O'Neill	1999–2000
Harry Thompson	Tony Broughton	2000
Claudia Nash	Susan Duerden	1999–2000
Nellie Dingle	Sandra Gough	1995, 2000
Nellie Dingle	Maggie Tagney	1995, 2000
Ned Glover	Johnny Leeze	1994–2000
Laura Johnstone	Louise Beattie	1998–2000
Roy Glover	Nicky Evans	1994–2000
Caleb Dingle	Mike Kelly	2000
Mike Blake	Barry James Anderson	2000
Sarah Sugden	Madeleine Howard	1988–2000
Sarah Sugden	Alyson Spiro	1988–2000
Denise Carter	Maxine Burth	2000

=== Last appeared in 2001 ===
Character	Actor(s)	Duration
Adam Forrester	Tim Vincent	2000–2001
Frankie Smith	Gina Aris	1999–2001
Frankie Smith	Madeleine Bowyer	1999–2001
Jonny Bradley	Ben Bryant	2000–2001
Bev Mansfield	Sarah Malin	2000–2001
Ben McCarthy	Ciarán Griffiths	2001
Carol Wareing	Helen Pearson	2000–2001
Virginia West	Bridget Fry	2000–2001
Barbara Strickland	Alex Hall	1998–2001
Ed Wills	James Midgley	2001
Maureen Blackstock	Joanna Monro	2001
Joe Fisher	Edward Baker-Duly	2000–2001
Alice Bates	Kimberley Hewitt	1991–1999, 2001
Alice Bates	Rachel Tolboys	1991–1999, 2001
Elsa Chappell	Naomi Lewis	1990–1991, 1993–1994, 1999, 2001
Elsa Chappell	Natasha Gray	1990–1991, 1993–1994, 1999, 2001

=== Last appeared in 2002 ===
Character	Actor(s)	Duration
Andrew Fraser	Mark Elstob	2001–2002
Sean Reynolds	Stephen McGann	1999–2002
Barbara Kirk	Judi Jones	1998–2000, 2002
Jess Weston	Ruth Abram	2001–2002
Tony Bell	Phil Atkinson	2001–2002
Peg Dingle	Jeanne Hepple	2002
Phil Weston	Mark Jardine	2001–2002
Maggie Calder	Dee Whitehead	2001–2002
Craig Calder	Jason Hain	2001–2002
Lucy Calder	Elspeth Brodie	2001–2002
Harry Partridge	Norman Mills	2002
Edith Weatherall	Elizabeth Kelly	2002
Melanie Say	Kelli Hollis	2002
Councillor Ecclestone	David Telfer	2000, 2002
Angie Reynolds	Freya Copeland	1999–2002
DC Adrien Collins	Trevor Fox	2002
Jedediah Dingle	Richard Mayes	2002
Kirk Daggert	Alexander Fothergill	2001–2002
Cynthia Daggert	Kay Purcell	2001–2002
Jason Kirk	James Carlton	1999–2002
Ray Mullan	Seamus Gubbins	2001–2002

=== Last appeared in 2003 ===
Character	Actor(s)	Duration
Jerry MacKinley	Rob Dixon	2002–2003
Wilf Butler	Peter Armitage	2003
Stephen Butler	William Snape	2003
DS Karen Barnborough	Joanne Mitchell	2003
Yolanda Howie	Charlotte Faber-Scott	2003
Geoffrey Brook	Trevor Lee Brown	2003
Mavis Cathcart	Jacqueline Pilton	2003
Chris Tate	Peter Amory	1989–2003
Ollie Reynolds	Vicky Binns	1999–2003
Ronnie Marsden	Ray Ashcroft	2003
Alistair Marsden	Danny Tennant	2003
Elaine Marsden	Samantha McCarthy	2003
Frances Marsden	Sandy Walsh	2003
PC Haddon	Christopher Wright	2002–2003

=== Last appeared in 2004 ===
Character	Actor(s)	Duration
Tricia Dingle	Sheree Murphy	1998–2004
Gloria Pollard	Janice McKenzie	2000–2004
Brian Addyman	Martin Reeve	2001–2004
Nancy Ryan	Michelle Butt	2004
Charlie Willis	Andrew Readman	2003–2004
Carrie Granger	Laura Crossley	2004
Carlos Diaz	Gary Turner	2000–2001, 2004
Emma Nightingale	Rachel Ambler	1995–1996, 2004
Paul Marsden	Matthew Booth	2003–2004
Siobhan Marsden	Abigail Fisher	2003–2004
Elvis Dingle	Martin Walsh	2002, 2004
Marilyn Dingle	Morag Siller	2002, 2004
Albert Dingle	Bobby Knutt	1995–1997, 2004
Frank Bernard Hartbourne	Rob Parry	2004
Solomon Dingle	Paul Shane	2004
Roger Dyson	Malcolm Terris	2004
Syd Woolfe	Nathan Gladwell	2002–2004
Seth Armstrong	Stan Richards	1978–2004
David Anders	Richard Avery	2004

=== Last appeared in 2005 ===
Character	Actor(s)	Duration
Amy Carter	Bethany Webb	2005
DI Tom Keysell	John Branwell	2003–2005
Steven Dickinson	Oliver Hingston	2005
Moira Stanley	Kate Hampson	2005
Marian Winters	Ann Aris	2005
Johnny Hupton	Andrew Whitehead	2005
Shelley Williams	Carolyn Pickles	2003–2005
Chloe Atkinson	Amy Nuttall	2000–2005
Sian Harper	Maeve Larkin	2005
Ivy Lynch	Mags Gannon	2005
Rachel Whatmore	Zoe Lambert	2003–2005
PC Linda Johnson	Julie Riley	2003–2005
Juliet Garside	Jo Ellis	2005
Neville Gunn	Trevor Williams	2005
Glynis Hardy	Christine Cox	2002–2005
Lynda Ashby	Deborah Cooley Chad	2005
Tamsin Charles	Jenny Gleave	2005
Rose Meyers	Charlotte West-Oram	2005
Libby Charles	Ty Glaser	2005
Jimmy Pepper	Michael Gunn	2005
Avril Kent	Melanie Hill	2005
Effie Harrison	Phillipa Peak	2005
Denzil Calburn	Danny Lawrence	2003–2005
Zoe Tate	Leah Bracknell	1989–2005
Jean Tate	Megan Pearson	2003–2005
Callum Rennie	Andrew Whipp	2004–2005
Neil DePaul	Martin Troakes	2005
DI Kara Warren	Julie Saunders	2005
Jay Aswar	Guy Rhys	2005
Max King	Charlie Kemp	2005
Kathy Glover	Malandra Burrows	1985–2001, 2005
Biff Fowler	Stuart Wade	1994–1999, 2005
Councillor Henry Ledbetter	Robin Bowerman	2002–2005
Jarvis Skelton	Richard Moore	2002–2005
Freda Danby	Lyn Paul	2003, 2005

=== Last appeared in 2006 ===
Character	Actor(s)	Duration
Josh Hope	Marc Silcock	2001, 2006
Craig Briggs	Nick Stanley	2005–2006
Sandra Briggs	Sally Ann Matthews	2005–2006
Caroline Addyman	Daryl Fishwick	2002, 2004, 2006
Lesley Meredith	Sherrie Hewson	2004–2006
Bobby-John Downes	Brian Hibbard	2003, 2006
Terence Turner	Stephen Marchant	1985, 2006
Terence Turner	Nick Brimble	1985, 2006
Beryl Chugspoke	Georgina Hale	2006
Barney Chugspoke	Huw David Thomas	2006
David Brown	Peter Alexander	2006
Noreen Bell	Jenny Tomasin	2005–2006
Dawn Woods	Julia Mallam	2003–2006
Tash Abbott	Sally Evans	2004–2006
Alice Dingle	Ursula Holden-Gill	2004–2006
Simon Meredith	Dale Meeks	2003–2006
Ivan Jones	Daniel Brocklebank	2005–2006
Gilbert Duff	Christopher Beeny	2006
Martin Crowe	Graeme Hawley	2004–2006
Denise Eden	Andrina Carroll	2003, 2006
Denise Eden	Lisa Parry	2003, 2006
Latisha Daggert	Danielle Henry	2001–2002, 2006
Sadie King	Patsy Kensit	2004–2006
Ethan Blake	Liam O'Brien	2003–2006
Adam Forsythe	Richard Shelton	2005–2006
Isla Forsythe	Sara Griffiths	2005–2006
Susie Carter	Polly Highton	2006
Jean Hope	Julie Higginson	2003–2004, 2006
Jean Hope	Susan Penhaligon	2003–2004, 2006
Tom King	Ken Farrington	2004–2006

=== Last appeared in 2007 ===
Character	Actor(s)	Duration
Toni Daggert	Kerry Stacey	2005–2007
Jackie Stiles	Ishia Bennison	2007
Scott Windsor	Toby Cockerell	1993–1996, 1998–2007
Scott Windsor	Ben Freeman	1993–1996, 1998–2007
Helen Dyson	Shirley Dixon	2004, 2006–2007
Vonda Lockhart	Lorelei King	2006–2007
Roxy Lockhart	Chloe Procter	2006–2007
Del Dingle	Hayley Tamaddon	2005–2007
Len Reynolds	Peter Martin	2001–2007
Errol Michaels	Antony Booth	2007
Eddie Hope	Nigel Betts	2003, 2007
Owen Hartbourne	Oliver Lee	2006–2007
Marc Reynolds	Anthony Lewis	1999–2002, 2007
Tara Thornfield	Anna Brecon	1997–1998, 2000–2002, 2007
Danny Daggert	Cleveland Campbell	2001–2007
Dan McHerron	Patrick Molyneux	2007
Jon Dingle	Lucy Webb	2004, 2006–2007
Luke Dingle	Dean McGonagle	2004, 2006–2007
Lilith Dingle	Amanda Hennessy	2004, 2006–2007
Mark Dingle	Cormac Golden	2004, 2006–2007
Mark Dingle	Joe Manuel	2004, 2006–2007
Matthew Dingle	Cillian Golden	2004, 2006–2007
Matthew Dingle	Joshua Chamberlin	2004, 2006–2007
Hari Prasad	John Nayagam	2005–2007
Rita Brannigan	Emma Kearney	2005–2007
Colin McFarlane	Michael Melia	2007
Andrea Hayworth	Cathy Tyson	2007
Rosemary King	Linda Thorson	2006–2007
DCI Grace Barraclough	Glynis Barber	2006–2007
Phyllis King	Sheila Burrell	2005, 2007
Richie Carter	Glenn Lamont	1999–2001, 2007
Billy Hopwood	David Crellin	1997–1998, 2003, 2006–2007
Penny Drury	Amelia Sefton	2007
Kirsty Rayfield	Ruth Westley	2007

=== Last appeared in 2008 ===
Character	Actor(s)	Duration
Alasdair Sinclair	Raymond Coulthard	2006, 2008
Ryan Hayworth	Reece Noi	2007–2008
Duke Woods	Dicken Ashworth	2007–2008
Carrie Nicholls	Linda Lusardi	2007–2008
Nick Baine	Samuel Kane	2008
Daniel Thomas	Rachel Moonie	2007–2008
Jack Sugden	Andrew Burt	1972–1973, 1976, 1980–2008
Jack Sugden	Clive Hornby	1972–1973, 1976, 1980–2008
Emily Kirk	Kate McGregor	1999–2008
Cindy Burton	Tiffany Chapman	2008
Brenda McFarlane	Judy Holt	2007–2008
Charlie Sellers	Michael Keogh	2008
Hilary Potts	Paula Wilcox	2007–2008
Joe Jacobs	John Woodvine	2008
Sharon Lambert	Victoria Hawkins	2007–2008
Greg Doland	Shaun Prendergast	2007–2008
Melanie Doland	Caroline Strong	2007–2008
Perdita Hyde-Sinclair	Georgia Slowe	2006–2008
Miles De Souza	Ayden Callaghan	2007–2008
Bonnie Drinkwater	Sue Jenkins	2008
Grayson Sinclair	Christopher Villiers	2006–2008
Louise Appleton	Emily Symons	2001–2008
Donald De Souza	Michael Jayston	2007–2008
Gary McFarlane	Colin Connor	2008
Peter Birch	Philip Bird	2006, 2008
Shane Doyle	Paul McEwan	2008
Matthew King	Matt Healy	2004–2008
Jo Stiles	Roxanne Pallett	2005–2008

=== Last appeared in 2009 ===
Character	Actor(s)	Duration
Anna De Souza	Emma Davies	2008–2009
Charles Vaughan	Richard Cole	2006–2009
Richard Montclare	Dominic Jephcott	2008–2009
Patricia Foster	Vicki Michelle	2007–2009
Jonny Foster	Richard Grieve	2007–2009
Pam Montclare	Catherine Rabett	2008–2009
Ross Kirk	Samuel Anderson	2007–2009
Sgt. Andrew Drake	Steven Hillman	2008–2009
Annie Sugden	Sheila Mercier	1972–1996, 2009
Danielle Hutch	Nicola Stapleton	2008–2009
DS Karen Williams	Annie Fitzmaurice	2006–2009
Theo Hawkins	Tom Knight	2009
Jasmine Thomas	Jenna-Louise Coleman	2005–2009
Dean Morris	Marc Bolton	2004–2007, 2009
Daz Eden	Luke Tittensor	2003–2009
John McNally	Steven Farebrother	2004–2009
Mick Naylor	Tony Haygarth	2008–2009
Lee Naylor	Lewis Linford	2008–2009
Eddy Fox	Paul Darrow	2009
Lily Butterfield	Anne Charleston	2006–2009
Lexi King	Sally Oliver	2007–2009
Jake Doland	James Baxter	2007–2009
Michael Conway	Jamie Belman	2009
Vincent Spode	Antony Byrne	2009

== 2010s ==
=== Last appeared in 2010 ===
Character	Actor(s)	Duration
Mark Wylde	Maxwell Caulfield	2009–2010
George Postlethwaite	Peter Cartwright	2000–2005, 2007–2010
Kayleigh Gibbs	Lily Jane Stead	2005–2010
Sue Hastings	Jan Francis	2010
Sally Spode	Siân Reeves	2009–2010
Olena Petrovich	Carolin Stoltz	2009–2010
Colleen King	Melanie Ash	2004–2005, 2010
Eli Dingle	Joseph Gilgun	2006–2010
Jamie Hope	Alex Carter	2006–2010
Tania Page	Victoria Pritchard	2010
Wayne Dobson	Gary Hanks	2010
Charlie Haynes	George Costigan	2010
Curtis Bevan	Kyle Rees	2010
Adele Allfrey	Tanya Vital	2008–2010
Mickey Hall	Lee Oakes	2010
Abi Peterson	Catherine Tyldesley	2010
Dan Cravely	James Boyland	2010
Natasha Wylde	Amanda Donohoe	2009–2010
Nathan Wylde	Lyndon Ogbourne	2009–2010

=== Last appeared in 2011 ===
Character	Actor(s)	Duration
Michael Feldmann	Matthew Vaughan	1990–1994, 2010–2011
Will Wylde	Oscar Lloyd	2009–2011
Maisie Wylde	Alice Coulthard	2009–2011
Terry Woods	Billy Hartman	1995–2011
Viv Hope	Deena Payne	1993–2011
T.J. Woods	Connor Lee	2003–2011
Stephanie Ray	Elianne Byrne	2011
Laura Prior	Elaine Glover	2010–2011
Nick Henshall	Michael McKell	2008–2011
Josh Walsh	Benjamin Murphy	2011
Faye Lamb	Kim Thomson	2009–2011
Tanya Callard	Susan McArdle	2009, 2011
Ryan Lamb	James Sutton	2009–2011
Derek Benrose	Stephen Bent	2010–2011
Kelly Windsor	Adele Silva	1993–2000, 2005–2007, 2011
Joe Chappell	Scott Taylor	2011
Jackson Walsh	Marc Silcock	2010–2011
Steve Kelly	Andy Walker	2011
Annie Kelly	Joanna Bond	2011
Jerry Walsh	Michael J. Jackson	2010–2011
Eve Jenson	Raine Davison	2001–2002, 2006, 2010–2011
Eve Jenson	Suzanne Shaw	2001–2002, 2006, 2010–2011
Jared Haynes	Philip Hill-Pearson	2011
Ella Hart	Corrinne Wicks	2010–2011
Mia Macey	Sapphire Elia	2010–2011
Dermot Macey	Frank Kelly	2010–2011
Flynn Buchanan	Ryan Prescott	2011
Nicky Pritchard	Matt Milburn	2011

=== Last appeared in 2012 ===
Character	Actor(s)	Duration
Hazel Rhodes	Pauline Quirke	2010–2012
John Barton	James Thornton	2009–2012
Roz Fielding	Kirsty-Leigh Porter	2010–2012
Ed Roberts	Lloyd Everitt	2012
Justin Gallagher	Andrew Langtree	2010–2012
Talia Brice	Carolynne Poole	2012
Trevor Cunningham	Justin McDonald	2012
Nigel Townsend	Andonis Anthony	2012
Davey Aldred	James Lauren	2012
Carl King	Tom Lister	2004–2012
Anya King	Ceryen Dean	2004−2007, 2009−2010, 2012
Anya King	Millie Archer	2004−2007, 2009−2010, 2012
Anya King	Lauren Sheriston	2004−2007, 2009−2010, 2012
Scarlett Nicholls	Kelsey-Beth Crossley	2007–2012
Brett Harrison	Gideon Turner	2012
Alex Moss	Kurtis Stacey	2011–2012

=== Last appeared in 2013 ===
Character	Actor(s)	Duration
Luke Salter	Daniel Pearson	2012–2013
Lizzie Lakely	Kitty McGeever	2009–2013
Harry Murray	Alfie Middlemiss	2011, 2013
Dylan Murray	Mikey Thomasson	2011, 2013
Kirk Stoker	Matt Kennard	2013
Alan Turner	Richard Thorp	1982–2013
Natalie	Gemma Danielle Salusbury	2013
Gennie Walker	Sian Reese-Williams	2008–2013
Dr Josephine Abbott	Kate Maravan	2006–2013
Neil Gutterson	Cameron Stewart	2013
Beattie Dixon	Eileen O'Brien	2013
Gary Benson	Stephen Donald	2013
Steve Harland	Tom Mannion	2012–2013
Cameron Murray	Dominic Power	2011–2013
Steph Stokes	Lorraine Chase	2002–2006, 2013
Lindy Haswell	Nimmy March	2013
Gil Keane	David Easter	2013

=== Last appeared in 2014 ===
Character	Actor(s)	Duration
Jude Watson	Andy Wear	2011–2014
William Makepeace	Dudley Sutton	2014
Seb Makepeace	James Redmond	2014
Ian Chamberlain	Robert Cavanah	2014
Tiny Alcock	Tony Pritchard	2014
Dom Andrews	Wil Johnson	2012–2014
Gary North	Fergus O'Donnell	2014
Donna Windsor	Sophie Jeffery	1993–2009, 2014
Donna Windsor	Verity Rushworth	1993–2009, 2014
Carole	Tracy Brabin	2014
Robbie Lawson	Jamie Shelton	2012–2014
Declan Macey	Jason Merrells	2010–2014
Sean Spencer	Luke Roskell	2011–2014

=== Last appeared in 2015 ===
Character	Actor(s)	Duration
Gemma Andrews	Tendai Rinomhota	2012–2015
Katie Sugden	Sammy Winward	2001–2015
Darren Thompson	Danny Horn	2015
Caroline Swann	Sarah Moyle	2007, 2009, 2015
Ruby Haswell	Alicya Eyo	2011–2015
Ali Spencer	Kelli Hollis	2011–2015
Rachel Breckle	Gemma Oaten	2011–2015
Paul Lambert	Mathew Bose	2004–2010, 2015
Alicia Gallagher	Natalie Anderson	2010–2015
Edna Birch	Shirley Stelfox	2000–2015
Charlotte Beecham	Emma Hartley-Miller	2007–2009, 2015
Tanya	Hilary Connell	2015
Mrs Winterbottom	Liz Dawn	2015
Betty Eagleton	Paula Tilbrook	1994–2015

=== Last appeared in 2016 ===
Character	Actor(s)	Duration
Tess Harris	Nicola Stephenson	2015–2016
Molly Sharma	Maia Rose Smith	2012–2013, 2015–2016
Molly Sharma	Uncredited	2012–2013, 2015–2016
Nikhil Sharma	Rik Makarem	2009–2013, 2015–2016
Gordon Livesy	Gerard Fletcher	2003–2004, 2006, 2008, 2015−2016
Gordon Livesy	Gary Mavers	2003–2004, 2006, 2008, 2015−2016
Ryan Harred	George Sampson	2016
Andy Sugden	Kelvin Fletcher	1996–2016
Angie Bailey	Nina Toussaint-White	2016
Dean	Craig Vye	2016
Jermaine Bailey	Micah Balfour	2015–2016

=== Last appeared in 2017 ===
Character	Actor(s)	Duration
Joanie Wright	Denise Black	2013, 2015–2017
Maggie	Philippa Howell	2017
Will Scott	Ben Gerrard	2016–2017
Carly Hope	Rebecca Ryan	2001, 2006, 2015–2017
Carly Hope	Gemma Atkinson	2001, 2006, 2015–2017
Matt	Jack Hickey	2017
Rakesh Kotecha	Pasha Bocarie	2014–2017
Ronnie Hale	John McArdle	2016–2017
Jamie Halstead	Jake Hayward	2017
Ethan	Michael Warrender	2017
Josh Crowther	Conner Chapman	2017
Martha Harris	Elaine Claxton	2017
Jason	Samuel Edward-Cook	2017
Nell Fairfax	Scarlett Archer	2017
Emma Barton	Gillian Kearney	2015–2017
Finn Barton	Joe Gill	2013–2017
James Barton	Bill Ward	2013–2017
Shadrach Dingle	Andy Devine	2000, 2002–2010, 2017
Shadrach Dingle	Matt Sutton	2000, 2002–2010, 2017
Val Pollard	Charlie Hardwick	2004–2015, 2017

=== Last appeared in 2018 ===
Character	Actor(s)	Duration
Adam Barton	Adam Thomas	2009–2018
Chrissie White	Louise Marwood	2014–2018
Lawrence White	John Bowe	2014–2018
DC Wilson	Jennifer Lord	2017–2018
Ashley Thomas	John Middleton	1996–2018
Sandy Thomas	Freddie Jones	2005–2018
Alex Mason	Steven Flynn	2017–2018
Phil Webb	Ryan Hayes	2018
Garry Stone	Paul David-Gough	2014–2015, 2017–2018
Syd MacFarlane	James Foster	2018
Gerry Roberts	Shaun Thomas	2017–2018
Terry	Daniel Casey	2018
Beth	Annabelle Kaye	2018
Misty Allbright	Hedydd Dylan	2018
Mark Bails	Rocky Marshall	2014–2015, 2018
Obadiah Dingle	Paul Copley	2018
Connor	Cameron Jack	2018
Rebecca White	Emily Head	2016–2018
Clive	Tom Chambers	2018

=== Last appeared in 2019 ===
Character	Actor(s)	Duration
Isaac Nuttall	Jake Roche	2010, 2018–2019
Isaac Nuttall	Benedict Shaw	2010, 2018–2019
Lachlan White	Thomas Atkinson	2014–2019
Donny Cairn	Alan Convy	2015, 2019
Aiesha Richards	Shila Iqbal	2018–2019
Max Garrick	Jordan Reece	2019
Karen	Reanne Farley	2019
Natalie	Thea Beyleveld	2019
Frank Clayton	Michael Praed	2016–2019
Jack Sugden	Seth Ball	2012–2019
Megan Macey	Gaynor Faye	2012–2019
Eliza Sharma	Kyrena Robinson	2016–2019
Jessie Grant	Sandra Marvin	2017–2019
Derek Malone	Tommy Cannon	2019
Lee Posner	Kris Mochrie	2019
Sebastian White	Lily Westmoreland	2017–2019
Sebastian White	Opie Atkinson	2017–2019
Maya Stepney	Louisa Clein	2018–2019
Dee Dee	Mia Gibson-Reed	2017, 2019

== 2020s ==
=== Last appeared in 2020 ===
Character	Actor(s)	Duration
Pierce Harris	Jonathan Wrather	2016–2017, 2020
Pete Barton	Anthony Quinlan	2013–2020
Douglas Potts	Duncan Preston	2007–2011, 2014–2020
Pearl Ladderbanks	Meg Johnson	2003–2020
DI Mark Malone	Mark Womack	2020
DS Jason Wise	Neil Roberts	2016–2020
Kirin Kotecha	Adam Fielding	2014–2016, 2020
Kirin Kotecha	Rish Shah	2014–2016, 2020

=== Last appeared in 2021 ===
Character	Actor(s)	Duration
Danny Harrington	Louis Healy	2019–2021
Debbie Dingle	Charley Webb	2002–2021
Connor Cooper	Danny Cunningham	2020–2021
Paul Ashdale	Reece Dinsdale	2020–2021
Luke Posner	Max Parker	2019–2021
Leanna Cavanagh	Mimi Slinger	2018–2021
Juliette Holliday	Amelia Curtis	2014, 2016, 2021
Russell Posner	Rob Jarvis	2021
Andrea Tate	Anna Nightingale	2019–2021
Jamie Tate	Jake Meays	1996–1999, 2019–2021
Jamie Tate	Elliott Suckley	1996–1999, 2019–2021
Jamie Tate	Sam Silson	1996–1999, 2019–2021
Jamie Tate	Oliver Carroll	1996–1999, 2019–2021
Jamie Tate	Bradley White	1996–1999, 2019–2021
Jamie Tate	Alexander Lincoln	1996–1999, 2019–2021
Ben Tucker	Simon Lennon	2020–2021

=== Last appeared in 2022 ===
Character	Actor(s)	Duration
Ellis Chapman	Asan N'Jie	2018–2022
Ellis Chapman	Aaron Anthony	2018–2022
Gavin	Ben Richards	2021–2022
DS Rogers	Matthew Flynn	2021–2022
Carol Butler	Laura Pitt-Pulford	2021–2022
Meena Jutla	Paige Sandhu	2020–2022
Jason Denshaw	Parry Glasspool	2022
Kit	Thoren Ferguson	2022
Millie Tate	Willow Bell	2019–2022
Hazel	Kate Anthony	2021–2022
Harriet Finch	Katherine Dow Blyton	2013–2022
Liv Flaherty	Isobel Steele	2016–2022
Diane Sugden	Elizabeth Estensen	1999–2022
Al Chapman	Michael Wildman	2019–2022

=== Last appeared in 2023 ===
Character	Actor(s)	Duration
Priya Sharma	Effie Woods	2009–2023
Priya Sharma	Fiona Wade	2009–2023
Amba Metcalfe	Ava Jayasinghe	2014–2023
Marcus Dean	Darcy Grey	2022–2023
Zak Dingle	Steve Halliwell	1994–2023
Theo Metcalfe	Talitha Taylor and Eve Rowlinski	2019–2023
Theo Metcalfe	Beau-Ronnie Newton	2019–2023
Naomi Walters	Karene Peter	2022–2023
Marshall Hamston	Max Fletcher	2023
Rishi Sharma	Bhasker Patel	2011–2023
Georgia Sharma	Trudie Goodwin	2011–2015, 2023
Georgia Sharma	Lin Blakley	2011–2015, 2023
Lloyd Sawyer	Matt Sutton	2023
Dan Spencer	Liam Fox	2011–2023
Victor Anderson	Eddie Osei	2023
Corey Sanderson	Kyle Rowe	2023
Craig Reed	Ben Addis	2023
David Metcalfe	Matthew Wolfenden	2006–2023
Chloe Harris	Jessie Elland	2021–2023
Reuben Harris	Sebastian Downes	2023

=== Last appeared in 2024 ===
Character	Actor(s)	Duration
Heath Hope	Lilith Kitching	2007–2024
Heath Hope	Sebastian Dowling	2007–2024
Sophie Grisham	Martha Cope	2023–2024
Oscar Grisham	Harley Hamilton	2023–2024
Lisa Dingle	Jane Cox	1996–2020, 2024
Damon Harris	Robert Beck	2023–2024
Amit Sharma	Anil Goutam	2023–2024
Gus Malcolm	Alan McKenna	2023–2024
Ethan Anderson	Emile John	2021–2024
Nicky Miligan	Lewis Cope	2022–2024
Suni Sharma	Brahmdeo Shannon Ramana	2023–2024
Samson Dingle	Bradley Milnes	2006−2024
Samson Dingle	Ben Shooter	2006−2024
Samson Dingle	Charlie Pell	2006−2024
Samson Dingle	Sam Hall	2006−2024
Rose Jackson	Christine Tremarco	2024
Helen Fox	Sharon Maughan	2024
Tina Dingle	Jacqueline Pirie	1994–1996, 2024
Tina Dingle	Samantha Power	1994–1996, 2024
Holly Barton	Sophie Powles	2009–2012, 2016, 2024
DS Foy	Robert Cavanah	2024
Amelia Spencer	Daisy Campbell	2011–2024
Daz Spencer	Mark Jordon	2014, 2017–2019, 2024
Jade Garrick	Twinnie-Lee Moore	2024

=== Last appeared in 2025 ===
Character	Actor(s)	Duration	Ref.
Will Taylor	Dean Andrews	2019–2025	
Wendy Posner	Susan Cookson	2019–2025	
Anthony Fox	Nicholas Day	2024–2025	
Anna Finsbury	Rhea Bailey	2024–2025	
Suzy Merton	Martelle Edinborough	2022–2025	
Amy Wyatt	Chelsea Halfpenny	2010–2013, 2019–2025	
Amy Wyatt	Natalie Ann Jamieson	2010–2013, 2019–2025	
Leyla Harding	Roxy Shahidi	2008–2011, 2013–2025	
Ella Forster	Paula Lane	2024–2025	
Brenda Walker	Lesley Dunlop	2008–2025	
Cathy Hope	Ella Whitehouse-Downes	2007–2025	
Cathy Hope	Gabrielle Dowling	2007–2025	
Nate Robinson	Jurell Carter	2019–2025	
DCI Vikesh Dasari	Stephen Rahman-Hughes	2006−2007, 2025	
Gail Loman	Rachael Gill-Davis	2019, 2023–2025	
Cara Robinson	Carryl Thomas	2020, 2025	
Steph Miligan	Georgia Jay	2024–2025	
Bernice Blackstock	Samantha Giles	1998–2002, 2004, 2012–2019, 2021–2023, 2025	
Faith Dingle	Gillian Jephcott	2000, 2004, 2017–2019, 2021–2022, 2025	
Faith Dingle	Sally Dexter	2000, 2004, 2017–2019, 2021–2022, 2025	

=== Last appeared in 2026 ===
Character	Actor(s)	Duration	Ref.
Celia Daniels	Jaye Griffiths	2025–2026	
John Sugden	Oliver Farnworth	2024–2026	
Ray Walters	Joe Absolom	2025–2026	
DS Reid	Angela Lonsdale	2026	
Noah Dingle	Alfie Mortimer	2004–2005, 2009–2026	
Noah Dingle	Sam Duffy	2004–2005, 2009–2026	
Noah Dingle	Jack Downham	2004–2005, 2009–2026	
Helen	Nicole Evans	2026	
Caitlin Todd	Caroline Harker	2025–2026	
Steve Sykes	Jason Done	2026	
Jimmy King	Nick Miles	2004–2026	
Dawn Fletcher	Olivia Bromley	2018–2026	
Vinny Dingle	Bradley Johnson	2019–2026	
