= List of Emmerdale characters introduced in 2004 =

The following is a list of characters that first appeared in the British soap opera Emmerdale in 2004, by order of first appearance. All characters were introduced by the soap's executive producer, Keith Richardson.

== Noah Dingle ==
Noah Dingle
- Emmerdale character
- Portrayed by: Alfie Mortimer (2004); Sam Duffy (2005); Jack Downham (2009–2026)
- Duration: 2004–2005, 2009–2026
- First appearance: Episode 3676; 2 March 2004
- Last appearance: Episode 10,361; 5 August 2026
- Introduced by: Keith Richardson
- Spin-off appearances: Emmerdale: The Dingles - For Richer for Poorer (2010)
In-universe information
- Other names: Noah Tate; Noah Sharma; Noah Macey
- Father: Chris Tate
- Mother: Charity Dingle
- Stepfather: Jai Sharma; Declan Macey; Mackenzie Boyd
- Half-brothers: Joe Tate; Ryan Stocks; Moses Dingle
- Half-sisters: Debbie Dingle; Leyla Sugden
- Grandfathers: Frank Tate; Obadiah Dingle
- Uncles: Liam Hammond; Caleb Miligan; Jamie Tate
- Aunts: Zoe Tate
- Nephews: Oscar Grisham; Jack Sugden
- Nieces: Sarah Sugden
- First cousins: Nicky Miligan; Jean Tate; Millie Tate; Thomas Tate
- Other relatives: Zak Dingle; Cain Dingle; Marlon Dingle; Chas Dingle; Belle Dingle; Tina Dingle; Aaron Dingle; Mandy Dingle; Nate Robinson; Vinny Dingle

Noah Dingle (also Tate, Sharma, and Macey) is the son of Charity Dingle (Emma Atkins) and Chris Tate (Peter Amory). He appeared from March 2004 to 2005, and returned in October 2009 along with Charity. Noah is born while Charity was serving a life sentence for Chris' murder, even though Chris had actually committed suicide. Noah's paternity was doubtful as Charity had recently slept with her cousins, Cain (Jeff Hordley) and Marlon Dingle (Mark Charnock), as well as Chris, but DNA tests confirm that Noah is Chris' son. Charity, knowing she could not keep Noah with her in prison, sold him to Chris' sister Zoe Tate (Leah Bracknell). In return for this, Zoe tells the court that Chris framed Charity for murder and she is freed. The courts, however, do not allow Zoe to adopt Noah, due to her current workload, other family commitments and mental illness, so Charity takes him back and leaves the village. Charity and Noah return to the village when Charity discovers that her fiancé, Michael, has been having an affair with her daughter, Debbie Dingle (Charley Webb). After the wedding is called off, Charity and Noah move in with Debbie and her daughter, Sarah Sugden (Sophia Amber Moore). Charity sends Noah to the local primary school as he is too old to go to playgroup with Sarah.

Noah believes that Michael was his father, so he was crushed to discover that Chris was dead. Charity raises Noah's hopes by getting engaged to Cain. Noah asks Cain to be his father and Cain, becoming tearful, tells Noah that he will always be there for him. Noah is thrilled, and is pleased to be living with Charity, Cain, Debbie and Sarah. Noah lives happily in Tug Ghyll up until early 2011 when Cain gets paranoid about Charity and Jai Sharma (Chris Bisson) apparently having an affair. Charity is devastated when Cain sleeps with Faye Lamb (Kim Thomson); she realises that there is a spark between her and Jai, and moves into Holdgate Farm with Jai, Noah and the Sharma family. Noah begins to miss Cain and is later crushed when Charity announces her engagement to Jai. Noah begins to warm to Jai, and tells him that he "doesn't mind" him marrying Charity, as long as he doesn't have to call him his father, like he did with Michael and Cain. Secretly, Noah does not think that the wedding will ever happen, so he is shocked when Charity marries Jai. Instead of having children, Jai asks Charity if he can adopt Noah but they only settle on changing Noah's name to Sharma.

Noah is responsible for bullying Liv Flaherty (Isobel Steele) online, which is discovered by Robert Sugden (Ryan Hawley), who threatens him with shutting down his website. Noah suffers from a drug overdose and kidney failure to help Sarah, who is hiding drugs for Danny Harrington (Louis Healy). Noah is rushed to hospital after being found in the woods. Sarah begs him not to tell Charity, as she knows how much trouble she would be in. On Christmas Day, she tries to bribe Noah by giving him a wad of cash to keep him quiet, but he says that he still needs to make up his mind. When Noah is released from hospital, Sarah takes the time to lay out the foods he is supposed to eat, but Noah wants to rest.

=== Stalking Chloe Harris ===
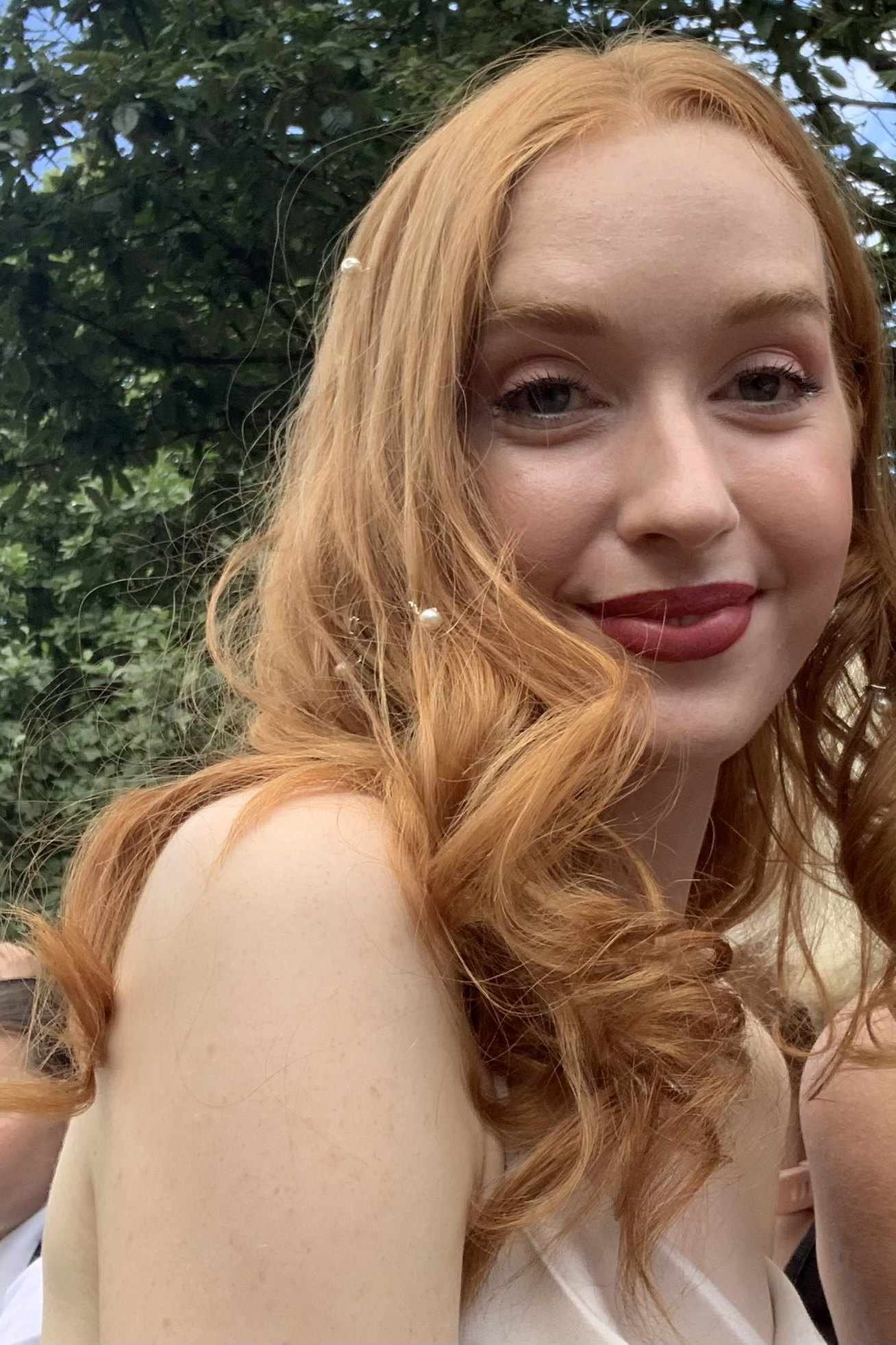
Noah stalks Chloe Harris (Jessie Elland, pictured), leading to his eventual imprisonment.

Noah forms romantic feelings for Chloe Harris (Jessie Elland), which disgusts Sarah since she feels that he will ruin her friendship with Chloe. He begins telling people that she is his girlfriend, which Chloe is shocked to learn. However, after meeting him in secret a few times, Chloe forms romantic feelings for Noah, which their families are not pleased about. Charity and Kerry Wyatt (Laura Norton) ban the pair from seeing each other, due to feeling that their relationship would bring trouble for both families. Elland compared the couple's situation to Romeo and Juliet and noted that they see each other as a "way to be happy and free". In a bid to be together, they plan an escape from the village, and Chloe begins to see Noah as an "escape route" from her controlling father. She confirmed that although her character does like Noah, but her main reason for executing the plan is to escape her home. However, they are soon found and taken back home. Elland said that the runaway scenes were fun to film since she enjoyed working with Downham on location and the weather was nice at the time.

After Chloe loses interest in Noah, she has sex with Jacob Gallagher (Joe-Warren Plant). After Noah learns of it, he loses his temper and brands her a "dirty slapper". He attempts to apologise to Chloe and brings her flowers, but she affirms that he is toxic and his wording was unacceptable. He snaps once again, throwing the flowers across the room and calling her a "village bike". The Metro's Calli Kitson worried for Chloe if Noah were to show more of his "sexism and toxic attitude". Lindsay (Metro) later confirmed that the story regarding Noah and Chloe was heading in a dark direction and said that he is capable of evil to pursue Chloe, despite her not wanting a relationship with him. Chloe spends the night with Nate Robinson (Jurell Carter), which Noah discovers. In an attempt to get Chloe back on his good side, he offers to take her for a drink to which she declines. Noah is "left angered by the apparent lack of reward for his apology" and is angered further when he learns of Chloe's fling with Nate.

Chloe had set her sights on Nate, who rejects her. Chloe then has to "deal with not getting her own way" and Noah takes advantage of Chloe's vulnerable state by getting close to her. His sudden change of attitude leads her to think Noah has "turned over a new leaf" and makes her keen to patch up her bond with him. However, Chloe sees her connection to Noah as a friendship. Elland explained that Chloe is engrossed in her feelings for Nate which means she cannot see that Noah's dishonest apologies and bad attitude. However, Elland confirmed that the storyline would eventually take a twist. She praised Emmerdale for covering a storyline about misogyny and sexism, a topic she described as "such a relevant conversation, especially in this day and age". Noah buys Chloe concert tickets, but uninterested in going with him, she leaves him for Nate. This leaves Noah "feeling vengeful" and a "dark choice" leads him to steal her phone. He plants a tracker on her phone so that he can show up in the same places as her, which he claims are coincidences. He pretends to have found her missing phone, and with Chloe thankful for him, he uses Chloe's gratitude to his advantage by getting her to agree to a date. Later, he buys a drone and flies it outside her bedroom window, recording her. Noah then steals her keys, lets himself into her bedroom and snoops around, taking photographs of her belongings, including her underwear drawer. However, she comes home unexpectedly, and he hides in her wardrobe.

In early May 2022, Noah takes Chloe hostage. Chloe is horrified to find thousands of photographs of herself and her belongings on her laptop which prove that he has been stalking her for weeks. She confronts him on the photographs, and Noah reacts badly, by refusing to let her leave and holding her mouth as she tries to scream for help. Downham, who portrays Noah, said that in his research for the storyline, he learned that many stalkers do not realise what they are doing is wrong. He found that Noah is the same, as he believes he is just trying to get Chloe's attention. Despite his constant belief that he has done nothing wrong to Chloe, he pleads guilty in court and is sentenced to three months in prison.

== Aubrey Bedford ==
Aubrey Bedford
- Emmerdale character
- Portrayed by: Richard Mullins
- Duration: 2004–2008, 2015
- First appearance: 18 March 2004
- Last appearance: 18 December 2015
- Introduced by: Keith Richardson
In-universe information
- Occupation: Estate Agent

Aubrey Bedford is an estate agent who first appears when he shows Tom King (Kenneth Farrington) around Holdgate Farm in March 2004, when Zoe Tate (Leah Bracknell) gave him first refusal after she found out the Dingle family had been powering their home from Holdgate. Tom liked the house and subsequently bought it. Aubrey then appeared again when he was hired by Alan Turner (Richard Thorp) to sell The Grange in July 2004. When Rodney Blackstock is trying to buy Home Farm, he decides to sell his house. Aubrey looks around the house, but is more interested in Rodney's son Paul Lambert. To get Aubrey away from Paul, Rodney agrees to flirt with Aubrey. Aubrey likes older men, so Rodney's attentions make him more invested in helping Rodney. Ultimately the sale does not go through because Rodney does not get Home Farm. Aubrey continues to appear on a recurring basis between 2004-2008.

Aubrey returns to the village in January 2015 when Katie Sugden (Sammy Winward) decided to sell Tug Ghyll, which fell through. Aubrey then returned again in December 2015 to discuss the sale of Diane Sugden's half of The Woolpack.

== Colleen King ==
Colleen King
- Emmerdale character
- Portrayed by: Melanie Ash
- Duration: 2004–2005, 2010
- First appearance: 1 April 2004
- Last appearance: 23 April 2010
- Introduced by: Keith Richardson
In-universe information
- Sisters: Andrea
- Husband: Carl King (1998–2004); Stefan (until 2023)
- Sons: Thomas King
- Daughters: Anya King

Colleen King, played by Melanie Ash, is the first wife of Carl King (Tom Lister), appearing in 2004, 2005 and 2010.

Colleen is divorced from Carl, with whom she had two children Thomas (Jack Ferguson; Connor Hill) and Anya (Ceryen Dean; Millie Archer). She has custody of the children, and appears in the village briefly in 2004 and 2005 when they visit Carl. Colleen returns in January 2010 with Thomas and Anya as she was going to visit her new husband, Stefan, in hospital after he has been injured in a work accident, and her sister wills not have them so she drops them off at Carl's whilst she nurses Stefan back to health. In April 2010, Colleen returns to and told Carl she wanted to emigrate to Saudi Arabia and take the children with her. She left with Thomas and Anya the following day.

In 2023, Colleen dies of a heart attack, off-screen.

== Thomas King ==
Thomas King
- Emmerdale character
- Portrayed by: Jack Ferguson (2004–2009); Connor Hill (2010); Mark Flanagan (2012–2013); James Chase (2023–present)
- Duration: 2004–2007, 2009–2010, 2012–2013, 2023–present
- First appearance: 1 April 2004
- Introduced by: Keith Richardson (2004, 2009); Steve November (2010); Stuart Blackburn (2012); Jane Hudson (2023); Iain MacLeod (2025); Laura Shaw (2026)
In-universe information
- Other names: Tom King
- Occupation: Kitchen assistant (2013); Veterinary surgeon
- Father: Carl King
- Mother: Colleen King
- Stepmother: Lexi King
- Sisters: Anya King
- Wife: Belle Dingle (2024–2025)
- Grandfathers: Tom King
- Grandmothers: Mary King
- Uncles: Jimmy King; Matthew King; Max King
- Aunts: Scarlett Nicholls
- First cousins: Elliot Windsor; Angelica King; Carl Holliday
- Other relatives: Phyllis King

Thomas King is the son of Carl (Tom Lister) and Colleen King (Melanie Ash). He appeared between 2004–2007 and 2009 played by Jack Ferguson, and by Connor Hill in 2010, followed by Mark Flanagan between 2012-2013. He returned in April 2023 on a regular basis, played by James Chase. On 26 July 2024, it was announced that Chase had quit the role and would depart the series when his storyline had concluded and Tom departed on 19 December 2024. He then returned in February 2025 in a guest appearance.

Named after his grandfather, Tom King (Kenneth Farrington), Thomas's parents separated when he was young. He first appears in 2004 when his mother tells Carl she wants a divorce and initially refuses to let him see the children. However, Thomas and his sister, Anya (Ceryen Dean; Lauren Sheriston), visit their father in 2005, 2006 and June 2007. In February 2009, he and Anya visit to meet their new future stepmother, Lexi Nicholls (Sally Oliver). Thomas is meant to attend the wedding but stays at home, due to chicken pox. In January 2010, Colleen arrives with the children, asking Carl to look after them as her husband has had an accident at work. They move into Mill Cottage temporarily. Thomas and Anya cause problems for Ashley (John Middleton) and Laurel Thomas (Charlotte Bellamy) and Edna Birch (Shirley Stelfox). In April, Colleen returns and tells Carl she wants to emigrate to Saudi Arabia and take the children with her and they leave the next day. Thomas and Anya return eight months later on Christmas Eve in preparation for Carl's ill-fated wedding to Chas Dingle (Lucy Pargeter) the following day but the wedding ends when Chas jilts Carl due to his affair with Eve Jenson (Suzanne Shaw). Carl takes Thomas and Anya back home to Saudi Arabia.

Thomas and Anya return to the village in October 2012, following their father's murder. Thomas asks his uncle Jimmy (Nick Miles) why Chas, believed to be Carl's killer, killed Carl. Jimmy is hesitant in telling them so Thomas goes to the local garage and asks Chas's brother, Cain Dingle (Jeff Hordley), and he tells Thomas that Chas killed Carl because he tried to rape her. Thomas later confronts Jimmy with this and Jimmy admits that Cain is telling the truth and that Carl was trying to rape Chas when he was killed. Thomas angrily tears up a photograph of his father. Thomas gets upset during his father's funeral service and angrily blurts out that Carl is a rapist in front of the congregation in the church as Jimmy is reading a eulogy about Carl. Thomas also claims that his father got what he deserved and leaves the church in a distressed state. Edna finds Thomas at the Cricket Pavilion and attempts to talk him round, telling him that he only has one chance to say goodbye to his father. Thomas accompanies Edna to the cemetery in time for the burial and comforts Anya by the graveside. Following the wake, Thomas and Anya return to the cemetery to discover Cameron Murray (Dominic Power), who is Carl's real killer, by the grave. He tells them he is sorry for their loss and leaves. The day after the funeral, Sean Spencer (Luke Roskell) invites Thomas and Anya to a party that his father, Dan (Liam Fox), is holding in the cafe but Thomas is too upset to go. On 5 November, Thomas and Anya return to Saudi Arabia. They bid an emotional farewell to Jimmy and his wife, Nicola (Nicola Wheeler), and their aunt, Scarlett Nicholls (Kelsey-Beth Crossley), drives them to the airport.

Thomas returns to the village in January 2013, when he is revealed to have been stalking Chas. Thomas was sending her photos in the post of her and Carl together with her eyes on the pictures scratched out, telephoning the pub on a withheld number, and slightly injuring her when he throws a glass bottle at her outside The Woolpack. He is revealed as the stalker when, after he graffitis the wall of the pub's living room and is disturbed by Gabby Thomas (Annelise Manojlovic). Chas and Jimmy chase him and apprehend him when he trips. Thomas reveals that he wanted revenge on Chas for killing his father. She tries to apologize and explains that she was acting in self-defence but Thomas refuses to forgive her. Jimmy lets Thomas stay with him, much to Nicola's disapproval. Jimmy intends to send Thomas back to Saudi Arabia but Thomas begs to stay, claiming that his mother does not care about him. Feeling guilty, Jimmy agrees and gives Thomas a job cleaning the haulage firms trucks. Nicola's half-sister, Bernice Blackstock (Samantha Giles), gets her boyfriend Steve Harland (Tom Mannion) to give Thomas a job at the stables at Home Farm. Still wanting revenge on Chas, Thomas begins manipulating Sean, claiming that Chas had been bad-mouthing his father, behind his back. An infuriated Sean throws a brick through the window of the Woolpack. Sean confesses this to Steve who sacks Thomas because of his trouble making.

When Cameron, now in a relationship with Chas, returns to the village after visiting his children in Jersey, he warns Thomas to stay away and leave Chas alone. Thomas continues to get up to mischief with Sean, stealing Sandy Thomas' (Freddie Jones) mobility scooter and damage it by driving it through a ford. Thomas also befriends local girls, Belle Dingle (Eden Taylor-Draper) and Gemma Andrews (Tendai Rinomhota). Belle develops a crush on Thomas and poses for provocative pictures which Gemma takes on her mobile phone in an attempt to get him to notice her.

Nicola convinces Chas to give Thomas a job as a kitchen hand at The Woolpack. Thomas agrees and tells Chas he wants a fresh start. Cameron is unnerved by Thomas's presence and tries to bully him out of his job, accusing him of still wanting revenge on Chas and criticizing every mistake he makes. Eventually when he discovers Thomas upset and crying, he feels guilty and gives Thomas a rise in his wages. Thomas accuses him of being "weird".

Thomas and Belle then begin a relationship after kissing at Sandy's 80th birthday party. They keep it a secret from their families at first but the truth eventually comes out. Jimmy and Nicola ban Thomas from seeing Belle and Belle's parents ban her from seeing Thomas. Thomas goes to visit Belle at Wishing Well Cottage and her father Zak Dingle (Steve Halliwell) arrives home to discover them kissing and orders Thomas to leave.

Jimmy reveals that he intends to send Thomas back to his mother in Saudi Arabia. He and Nicola then convince Bernice to sack Thomas from his job at the pub. Thomas and Belle decide to run away together and, with Sean's help, they steal Dan's camper van and drive away from the village. Belle's mother, Lisa Dingle (Jane Cox), becomes convinced that Thomas intends to attack Belle, like his father did to Chas. She calls the police and reports that Thomas abducted Belle. When Belle reveals that Carl had been in the camper the night he died, Thomas becomes upset. He turns the vehicle round and drives them back to the village, telling Belle that he wants to do the right thing. Jimmy and Nicola then arrange for Thomas to be sent home. On the day he is due to depart, Nicola realizes that Jimmy is upset by Thomas's departure. As he is about to leave, she asks him to stay. Thomas then goes to see Belle and she tells him that she hates her parents and blames them for ruining their relationship and her life. Thomas feels guilty and decides to leave after all. He steals Dan's camper van again, and flees the village. The police later tell Jimmy and Nicola that the camper has been found at the airport. Jimmy telephones Colleen in Saudi Arabia and she tells him that Thomas had arrived home and shut himself in his room, not wanting to speak to anyone.

=== Return and Domestic Violence towards Belle Dingle ===
Thomas, now known as Tom, returned to Emmerdale as a regular character, 10 years later on 27 April 2023 with James Chase taking over the role. After arriving in Emmerdale, he already faced an "awkward family reunion" Once again encounters Belle, they reconnect and resume their relationship. Chase described Tom's return: "Part of the darkness of that time in Tom's life definitely affected Chas. He was awful to her, he really was," he said. "We are definitely going into that again – more in the sense of Tom feeling that he's turned over a new leaf. He was very young and full of emotion when he was dealing with these issues. I don't think he really knew how to deal with them." Chase also described that Tom had some making up to do with some of the villagers: "He's definitely going down the route of trying to build those bridges up that he burned. With Chas, he will try to apologise to her and build that friendship again."

As time goes by and their relationshiop begins to grow, Tom manipulates Belle. When he proposes to her, she declines as she is not ready. Enraged at the rejection, he hits her, insisting it was an accident and he did not mean to and Belle believes him. Emmerdale teamed up with the charity, Refuge to portray a storyline where Belle would be the victim of domestic abuse at Tom's hands. Emmerdale producer, Sophie Roper described these storylines: "The behaviour Tom King is exhibiting is typical of a coercive controlling relationship and at times will prove difficult and uncomfortable to watch." She also described how Refuge helped assist the research the writers did in order to portray the plotline: "The assistance the charity Refuge has given us whilst researching this storyline has been enormously helpful in bringing this incredibly important storyline to our screens."

== Anya King ==
Anya King
- Emmerdale character
- Portrayed by: Ceryen Dean (2004–2009); Millie Archer (2010); Lauren Sheriston (2012)
- Duration: 2004–2007, 2009–2010, 2012
- First appearance: 1 April 2004
- Last appearance: 5 November 2012
- Introduced by: Keith Richardson
In-universe information
- Father: Carl King
- Mother: Colleen King
- Stepmother: Lexi King
- Brothers: Thomas King
- Grandfathers: Tom King
- Grandmothers: Mary King
- Uncles: Jimmy King; Matthew King; Max King
- Aunts: Scarlett Nicholls
- First cousins: Angelica King; Elliot Windsor; Carl Holliday
- Other relatives: Phyllis King

Anya King is the daughter of Carl (Tom Lister) and Colleen King (Melanie Ash). She appeared between 2004 and 2007, and again in 2009, being played by Ceryen Dean. Then again in 2010, played by Millie Archer, and once again 2012, played by Lauren Sheriston.

Anya's parents separated when she was young and she first appears in 2004 when her mother Colleen tells Carl that she wants a divorce and initially refuses to let him see the children, however, Anya and her brother, Thomas (Jack Ferguson; Mark Flanagan), visit their father in 2005, 2006 and June 2007. In February 2009, she and Thomas visit, following Carl's engagement to Lexi Nicholls (Sally Oliver). Anya is meant to attend her father's wedding the following month but stays at home with chicken pox. In January 2010, Colleen arrives with the children, asking Carl to look after them as her husband has had an accident at work. They move into Mill Cottage temporarily. In April 2010, Colleen returns and tells Carl she wants to emigrate to Saudi Arabia and take the children with her. She leaves with Anya and Thomas the following day. Anya returns with Thomas eight months later on Christmas Eve in preparation for Carl's ill-fated wedding to Chas Dingle (Lucy Pargeter) the following day. After the wedding ends with Chas jilting Carl and due to his affair with Eve Jenson (Suzanne Shaw), Carl takes Anya and Thomas back home to Saudi Arabia.

Anya and Thomas return to the village in October 2012, following their father's murder. Anya is initially hostile to her uncle Jimmy (Nick Miles) and his wife Nicola (Nicola Wheeler), stating that Mill Cottage is smaller than she remembered it and that their home in Saudi Arabia has two swimming pools. The following day, Anya goes through her father's belongings with Jimmy and he is forced to tell her and Thomas that Chas, who is believed to be Carl's killer, killed him because he tried to rape her. Jimmy later gives Anya Carl's hip flask. Anya goes to visit the offices of the haulage company to see where her father worked and meets Charity Dingle (Emma Atkins), Carl and Jimmy's business partner who had been going to buy Carl out of the business before his death. Thinking that Carl's shares will be inherited by his children, Charity offers to agree a price with Anya if she stays behind after the funeral but Rodney Blackstock ushers Anya out, accusing Charity of trying to rip her off and takes her home. Anya's aunt Scarlett Nicholls (Kelsey-Beth Crossley) warns her to steer clear of Charity and that she is using her.

During Carl's funeral, Anya is upset when Thomas causes a scene in the church, revealing Carl's rape attempt to the congregation and claiming that he got what he deserved before leaving the church in a distressed state. Anya is comforted by Scarlett and reconciles with Thomas by the graveside during the burial. Later, Thomas and Anya return to the cemetery following the wake and meet Cameron Murray (Dominic Power), who unbeknownst to them is their father's real killer, by the graveside. He tells them that he is sorry for their loss and leaves. The following day, Sean Spencer (Luke Roskell) invites Thomas and Anya to party his father Dan (Liam Fox) is holding in the café. Thomas is too upset to attend but Anya goes to the party with Scarlett. Anya attempts to talk to Sean, who is attracted to her, but he follows his father's advice and plays hard to get with her. Anya is unimpressed and leaves with Scarlett and Sean is angry with his father for interfering.

On 5 November, Anya and Thomas return to their mother in Saudi Arabia. Before they leave, Scarlett warns them to call them if Charity tries to contact them regarding their father's shares of the haulage firm. Anya and Thomas bid an emotional farewell to Jimmy and Nicola and Anya promises to speak to her cousin Angelica via a skype connection. Scarlett then drives them to the airport.

== PC Mike Swirling ==
PC Mike Swirling
- Emmerdale character
- Portrayed by: Andy Moore
- Duration: 2004–present
- First appearance: 2 April 2004
- Introduced by: Keith Richardson
In-universe information
- Occupation: Police officer

Police Constable Mike Swirling, played by Andy Moore, is a local police officer. He made his first screen appearance on 2 April 2004. In his first appearance, he is not named and is simply credited as "Policeman".

PC Swirling first appears when Terry Woods (Billy Hartman) calls the police to prevent his ex-wife Dawn Woods (Julia Mallam) from taking their son TJ Woods (Connor Lee) out of the country without his consent. Swirling appears to speak with Debbie Dingle (Charley Webb) after she gives her daughter Sarah Sugden (Lily-Mae Bartley) to Emily Kirk (Kate McGregor), who has left the country with her. He continues to appear when arresting or questioning various characters. Swirling later appears when investigating a series of robberies at the local bed and breakfast and The Woolpack pub, where Marlon Dingle (Mark Charnock) is attacked. Swirling features on multiple occasions in criminal storylines linked to the Dingle family, specifically Cain Dingle (Jeff Hordley).

Swirling later appears alongside DCI Grace Barraclough (Glynis Barber) when they investigate a robbery at a betting shop and various incidents involving Eli Dingle (Joseph Gilgun), including a warehouse robbery and the possession of stolen drugs. Swirling appears again during storylines about the disappearance of Mark Wylde (Maxwell Caulfield), Holly Barton's (Sophie Powles) drug abuse, Jimmy King's (Nick Miles) amnesia, and Laurel Thomas' (Charlotte Bellamy) carjacking. Swirling also features in a short story about Jimmy's involvement in a road accident after working extra hours. Swirling later features when Bernice Blackstock (Samantha Giles) is handcuffed by a man who steals her belongings, and again when he arrests Debbie Dingle for stabbing a customer who makes sexually advances to her.

Swirling bonds with his colleague, Donna Windsor (Verity Rushworth), and at the police station, they chat. Mike is sympathetic towards Donna after discovering that a company she had invested in has been declared bankrupt, meaning she has lost her life savings. As they chat, Mike comments that the work Christmas party will be good, without knowing that Donna will not be able to attend since she is terminally ill. Swirling and Donna give a talk in the village and crime prevention. He mentions to Donna that items are missing from evidence room, worrying Donna as she has been stealing them to raise money. Donna later spikes Swirling's coffee with laxatives, so that he will be unable to work. Donna is later killed, upsetting Mike who feels guilty for not being with Donna when she died. He begins investigating Donna's death, and later attends her funeral and wake.

Since, the character appears as part of storylines about Laurel's alcoholism, Alicia Metcalfe's (Natalie Anderson) sexual assault at the hands of Lachlan White (Thomas Atkinson), the hit-and-run death of Tess Harris (Nicola Stephenson), Harriet Finch's (Katherine Dow Blyton) stabbing, multiple teenage characters joyriding, Ross Barton's (Michael Parr) acid attack and Debbie's involvement in the attack, and the disappearance of Rebecca White (Emily Head).

== Martin Crowe ==
Martin Crowe
- Emmerdale character
- Portrayed by: Graeme Hawley
- Duration: 2004–2006
- First appearance: 18 May 2004
- Last appearance: 14 August 2006
- Introduced by: Keith Richardson
In-universe information
- Occupation: Detective Constable
- Daughters: Kayleigh Gibbs

Martin Crowe, played by Graeme Hawley, made his first appearance on 18 May 2004 and departed on 14 August 2006. Martin later begins a relationship with established character Louise Appleton (Emily Symons) but it ends following the revelation of her killing Ray Mullan (Seamus Gubbins). Hawley told Alison Gardner of What's on TV that he found it ironic as John Stape the next soap opera character he played, in Coronation Street, was a murderer.

Martin is the investigating officer when Jack Sugden (Clive Hornby) is accidentally shot in the chest by his adoptive son, Andy (Kelvin Fletcher). He returns to the village when he invesitgates Scott Windsor (Ben Freeman) and Syd Woolfe's (Nathan Gladwell) savage beating of Pearl Ladderbanks' (Meg Johnson) rapist son, Frank Bernard Hartbourne (Rob Parry). Martin is attracted to Woolpack barmaid, Louise appleton. Louise offers to babysit landlady Diane Sugden's stepdaughter Victoria (Hannah Midgley) and takes her to a Karate class where she bumps into Martin. There is a spark between them but there is delay in them getting together. Martin's daughter, Kayleigh Gibbs (Lily Jane Stead) is often a source of conflict between Martin and Louise, as Martin is a single father with full custody following his divorce.

Martin investigates the King family using illegal labourers on their new building site but is enraged when Louise hinders the investigation by revealing details, allowing Jimmy King (Nick Miles) to cover up any evidence. Martin and Kayleigh move in with Louise, much to Diane's chagrin. There are many domestic troubles and Kayleigh's behaviour becomes hard to manage as Louise is the opposite of Martin. Martin is annoyed when Kayleigh and Victoria gatecrash a rave and start terrorising Edna Birch (Shirley Stelfox). Upon learning that Sam Dingle (James Hooton) helped his wife Alice (Ursula Holden-Gill) who had terminal cancer, to die, Martin sets out to arrest him. Louise stands by Martin and this causes friction between her and Diane. In a heated argument, Diane let slip something about Ray Mullan, which Martin overhears. Louise has no choice but to come clean that she had killed Ray. Martin revealed that he had double standards and so says he will not report Louise but he feels he can no longer continue seeing her, so Martin and a tearful Kayleigh move out of The Woolpack and Louise's life.

== Lesley Meredith ==
Lesley Meredith
- Emmerdale character
- Portrayed by: Sherrie Hewson
- Duration: 2004–2006
- First appearance: 9 June 2004
- Last appearance: 12 May 2006
- Introduced by: Keith Richardson
In-universe information
- Husband: Mick Meredith (divorced)
- Sons: Simon Meredith
- Daughters: Bonnie Meredith

Lesley Meredith, played by Sherrie Hewson, made her first appearance on 9 June 2004. Lesley was introduced as the mother of an established character, fishmonger Simon Meredith (Dale Meeks). Hewson likened Lesley to her character Virginia Raven on Crossroads, which she had previously starred in with Emmerdale co-star Lucy Pargeter. She described Lesley as having "a bitchy side to her, which she uses against Simon's girlfriends." In February 2006, it was reported that Lesley would be written out alongside Simon after Hewson and Meeks were told their contracts would not be renewed. Hewson told Sarah Tetteh of the Daily Mirror: "I've had a great time on Emmerdale but it's time to move on." Hewson felt that a lot more could have been done with Lesley: "I saw her running the B&B or having her own chip shop. She was stuck in a rut. When that happens, it's best to move on – although the door is open for a return." She felt Lesley's storylines were not that exciting, but thought her exit was. She said, "Lesley runs off with a gypsy who Rodney Blackstock (Patrick Mower) befriends. He's a bit of a scallywag and it's quite out of character." Hewson added that she would miss co-stars Meeks and Elizabeth Estensen, but was glad not to be starting filming at 5:30am. To aid Lesley's departure, Brian Hibbard made a brief return as Bobby-John Downes, an old flame of Lesley's who had appeared in the series three years prior.

Lesley arrives in Emmerdale when her son, Simon Meredith, introduces her to his girlfriend Nicola Blackstock. A few weeks later, Lesley has dinner with Simon and Nicola. Not long after, when Simon's ex-fiancée Tash Abbott (Sally Evans) arrives in the village, Nicola grows jealous and the two women come to blows and Simon leaves for Scarborough. Nicola follows him and they resume their relationship, much to the surprise and delight of Lesley, who later Christmas with Simon. The following May, Lesley visits to help Simon and Nicola with house-hunting but they quickly tire of her interference and agreed that Not long after, Lesley tears a ligament in her arm and stayed with Simon and Nicola in order to recuperate. Lesley reveals to a furious Simon that the family business had gone into liquidation and her house was in danger of being repossessed. Problems escalate and Simon and Nicola argue. When Nicola tries to seduce Ivan Jones (Daniel Brocklebank), Lesley catches them and assumes they are having an affair. Lesley soon takes an interest in Nicola's father, Rodney and they later have sex. However, Rodney feels guilty, knowing he is not attracted to her. Kelly Windsor (Adele Silva) takes Lesley's place at an event Rodney attends which leaves her humiliated and heartbroken.

Bobby-John Downes, a former flame of Lesley's arrives in the village and they rekindle their romance. Simon is deeply skeptical of Bobby-John and is worried his mother will be hurt again. It soon transpires that Lesley has been stealing money from Kelly's credit card and uses it pay for a posh break away with Bobby-John. When the truth is revealed, everyone is horrified but Bobby-John finds it in his heart to forgive Lesley and they leave the village together.

== Callum Rennie ==
Callum Rennie
- Emmerdale character
- Portrayed by: Andrew Whipp
- Duration: 2004–2005
- First appearance: 23 June 2004
- Last appearance: 22 September 2005
- Introduced by: Keith Richardson
In-universe information
- Occupation: Home Farm estate manager

Callum Rennie was Home Farm's estate manager. He appeared from 2004 to 2005.

Callum works for Zoe Tate (Leah Bracknell), with whom he builds up a friendship. Callum is devoted to Zoe and eventually confides in her that he is in love with her, although he knows his feelings will never be reciprocated as Zoe is a lesbian. When Zoe leaves the village, he helps her tamper with the gas pipes and timer, and so causes an explosion when the King family, who had conned her out the property, arrive.

== Tash Abbott ==
Tash Abbott
- Emmerdale character
- Portrayed by: Sally Evans
- Duration: 2004, 2006
- First appearance: 18 July 2004
- Last appearance: 25 July 2006
- Introduced by: Keith Richardson

Natasha "Tash" Abbott, played by Sally Evans, is the former fiancée of Simon Meredith (Dale Meeks). Simon and Tasha reconnect when Tash visits him in the village, which makes Nicola Blackstock (Nicola Wheeler) increasingly jealous, worrying to Simon that Tash was trying to take him from her but he tells that she was being ridiculous. After sensing difficulties in Simon and Nicola's relationship, Tasha makes a pass at Simon but he rejects her. Nicola witnesses Tash giving Simon an apology card the next day and picks a fight with Tash. Nicola then spitefully tells the village that Tash's business in Scarborough was closed by the Environmental health service, which results in the Fish and Chip stall Tash has opened in the village losing customers. Simon is angry and tells Nicola off. Tash then leaves but returns the following month, when Simon lends her a sizeable amount of money.

She returns in January 2006 and repays the loan in full with interest. Tash returns twice, in April, which cheers Simon up following his split from Nicola and in the summer when she announces her engagement to Russell (Steve Radford) to Simon's shock and asks him to give her away, which secretly devastates Simon.

== Dean Morris ==
Dean Morris
- Emmerdale character
- Portrayed by: Marc Bolton
- Duration: 2004–2007, 2009
- First appearance: 20 July 2004
- Last appearance: 31 March 2009
- Introduced by: Keith Richardson
In-universe information
- Occupation: Foreman

Dean Morris was an employee of the King family. He appeared from 2004 to 2007 and in 2009.

Dean first appears in 2004 and works primarily as their chauffeur. He was one of the most loyal and trusted King employees. He takes Carl King (Tom Lister) around Romania following his involvement in the accidental death of Paul Marsden (Matthew Booth), and is forced to lie to Tom (Kenneth Farrington), which upsets him, as Tom has helped him on numerous occasions. At one point, false rumours suggest he is having an affair with Charity Tate (Emma Atkins); a few weeks later, Tom dumps Charity as he believes she has slept with Cain Dingle (Jeff Hordley), and as Dean drives him away from the wedding, Tom apologises for doubting him. Following Tom's death on Christmas Day 2006, Dean carries his coffin at the funeral along with Jimmy (Nick Miles), Matthew (Matt Healy) and Carl. In January 2009, he is a pallbearer at Matthew's funeral, and at the wake talks to Lexi Nicholls (Sally Oliver) about his loyalty to the Kings. The following day Dean brings some of Matthew's effects from the site office to Jimmy and Carl. When they see Rosemary Sinclair's (Linda Thorson) name plate from her coffin, Dean reveals to them that Matthew had dug up her body and crushed it in a rubbish truck. In February 2009, he drives a van to Belgium, not knowing Jimmy and Nicola De Souza (Nicola Wheeler) are in the back, having just slept together. The following month he attends Carl and Lexi's wedding. This was Dean's last appearance so far and he has not been seen since.

== Craig Briggs ==
Craig Briggs
- Emmerdale character
- Portrayed by: Nick Stanley
- Duration: 2004–2006
- First appearance: 1 August 2004
- Last appearance: 26 February 2006
- Introduced by: Keith Richardson
In-universe information
- Occupation: Farmer
- Wife: Sandra Briggs

Craig Briggs is a local farmer, who first appeared in August 2004 when he asks the local vicar Ashley Thomas (John Middleton) - who was considering leaving the ministry - to come visit his ill mother, who then passes away while seeing Ashley. He departs in February 2006 when his character was axed.

Briggs bought some land that the King's hoped to build the Kings River Showhome on in September 2005. He initially refuses Tom King's (Kenneth Farrington) offer to buy his land. Tom's son, Max King (Charlie Kemp) went to talk to Craig and his wife, Sandra Briggs (Sally Ann Matthews) about the land and even tries to charm her in the process. When Sandra finds out that Max is a vet, she asks him to look at their calves. However, Max planned to sabotage their farm by increasing the dosage of the drug put in the calves' feed. Initially, Paddy Kirk (Dominic Brunt) was blamed for the subsequent deaths of many calves, and those who hadn't died were dying, as his signature was on the prescription, but Craig knew Max was to blame and threw him up against a filing cabinet. As a result, Craig was forced to sell up his land and never forgave Max. He wasn't even sympathetic when he was killed in an explosion caused by a car accident in October 2005. Craig does get insurance money for the previous events, but he spent it on a new car, which annoyed Sandra. He secretly invested some of the money in the King's developments, which annoyed Sandra even more causing a strain on their relationship, as they were behind the deaths of their livestock. The strain built up even more when Sandra began working on the farm more, causing Eric Pollard (Chris Chittell) to fire her.

== John McNally ==
John McNally
- Emmerdale character
- Portrayed by: Steven Farebrother
- Duration: 2004–2009
- First appearance: 24 September 2004
- Last appearance: 4 June 2009
- Introduced by: Keith Richardson
In-universe information
- Occupation: Journalist

John McNally was a local journalist with the Hotton Courier. He has appeared since 2004.

First appearing in 2004, McNally - as he is normally known - appears whenever there is a newsworthy event in the village. In 2004, he corners Pearl Ladderbanks (Meg Johnson) when her rapist son Frank Bernard Hartbourne (Rob Parry) moves to the village after being released from prison. This sets off a chain of events which lead to the whole village finding out. In early 2005, he covers the disappearance of Shelley Williams (Carolyn Pickles), and her presumed murder by Steph Stokes (Lorraine Chase). When Eric Pollard (Chris Chittell) stands for re-election to the local Council, McNally tries to catch him in embarrassing positions, and catches him coming out of a van half-naked with Val Lambert (Charlie Hardwick). He also covers Steph being investigated for the murder of her brother Terence Turner (Nick Brimble) and Tom King's (Kenneth Farrington) murder. He hires aspiring journalist Jasmine Thomas (Jenna-Louise Coleman) for her village knowledge.

An unpopular man in the village, following Viv Hope's (Deena Payne) imprisonment he hounds her husband Bob (Tony Audenshaw) and writes an article claiming to expose Bob's alleged crime. This causes Bob to have a breakdown and stage a one-man protest outside the newspaper's offices. However, during this protest John is away attending the wedding of his former wife. In November 2008, he covers the new village choir's attempts to enter a competition; and in December, Jasmine demands her article about the local criminal family the McFarlanes is changed to a story about the church but McNally ignores her and prints the story.

McNally makes another appearance in April 2009, when Jasmine's grandfather Sandy (Freddie Jones) asks him to help with a campaign to overturn Jasmine's murder conviction. In spite of their close working relationship, McNally has no sympathy for her, and goes as far as to crack jokes about lesbians in prison before Sandy orders him to leave. McNally is last seen reporting on the local council elections in June 2009 when Eric stands for re-election and his son David Metcalfe (Matthew Wolfenden) stands against him. David wins the election and McNally interviews him for his victory speech and gets David and Eric to pose for photographs. He has not appeared since.

== Frank Bernard Hartbourne ==
Frank Bernard Hartbourne
- Emmerdale character
- Portrayed by: Rob Parry
- First appearance: 8 October 2004
- Last appearance: 25 October 2004
- Introduced by: Keith Richardson
In-universe information
- Mother: Pearl Ladderbanks
- Wife: Susan Hartbourne
- Sons: Owen Hartbourne
- Daughters: Nadine Hartbourne

Frank Bernard Hartbourne is the son of Pearl Ladderbanks (Meg Johnson). He appeared in 2004.

Frank Bernard arrives in Emmerdale to live with Pearl and her partner Len Reynolds (Peter Martin) after being released from prison for raping a neighbour of Pearl's. He was previously accused by a colleague but the case was dropped due to lack of evidence. Frank's first interactions are with postmistress Viv Hope (Emmerdale) and her daughter Donna Windsor (Verity Rushworth) and they are civil to him, not realising his identity. Frank later mingles with the locals in the Woolpack but when he confirms his identity to barmaid Louise Appleton (Emily Symons), prompting an angry reaction from Viv and many other villagers. Viv's son, Scott (Ben Freeman) and his friend Syd Woolfe (Nathan Gladwell) then eject Frank from the pub. At a local community action meeting organised by Viv, it evident that many villagers do not take kindly to having a rapist living amongst them and tempers flare and a mob arrive outside Jacob's fold and a rock is thrown through the window. Frank Bernard and Len get along well when he helps him with the guttering but neighbour Jarvis Skelton (Richard Moore) is constantly watching Frank Bernard's every move.

When Donna has an accident on her scooter, Frank Bernard goes to see if she is all right. Donna panics when she sees him and runs to Scott. Scott and Syd then attack Frank Bernard, thinking he has harmed Donna and leave him for dead. Frank Bernard is found by Rodney Blackstock (Patrick Mower) and Danny Daggert (Cleveland Campbell), who take him home. When Frank Bernard refuses to give the names of his attackers, Pearl thinks he has something to hide and doubts his innocence. However, Donna comes forward and reveals the truth. Following a police visit and Len confronting Scott, Frank Bernard still refuses to name his attackers. He then decides to move to a bail hostel in Leeds for his mother's sake.

The scene where Scott and Syd beat up Frank Bernard attracted 27 complaints. However, Ofcom ruled that Emmerdale were not in breach of any broadcasting codes as the scenes were edited in a careful manner.

== Solomon Dingle ==
Solomon Dingle
- Emmerdale character
- Portrayed by: Paul Shane
- First appearance: 19 October 2004
- Last appearance: 27 October 2004
- Introduced by: Keith Richardson
In-universe information
- Father: Bert Dingle
- Mother: Jessie Dingle
- Brothers: Obadiah Dingle; Elvis Dingle
- Sons: Mystic Dingle; Adam Dingle; Smudge Dingle; Moses Dingle
- Uncles: Jedediah Dingle
- Nieces: Charity Tate
- First cousins: Zak Dingle; Shadrach Dingle; Albert Dingle; Caleb Dingle; Ezra Dingle

Solomon Dingle, played by Paul Shane, made his first appearance on 19 October 2004. Shane admitted that he had been a fan of the serial since it started, so he accepted the role of Solomon straight away. He also said that he had enjoyed his guest stint as it allowed him to catch up with some of the actors he knew outside of the show.

Solomon is introduced when Sam Dingle (James Hooton) is sent to prison. He decides to pay a visit to the Dingles, who are holding a family gathering, upon his release. Solomon is billed as the "king of the Dingles" and Zak Dingle's (Steve Halliwell) "arch-rival". Shane described his character as "a Jack the lad." He continued: "Him and Zak don't like one another, and he's just come out of the woodwork again. Solomon and Zak are cousins, but Solomon is king Dingle – the head of the family – and Zak doesn't like that. So when he arrives in Emmerdale for the party, it's not long before sparks are flying." Zak challenges Solomon to "the travelling people's code" which is five challenges, like drinking ale from a wellington boot and barrel carrying. Shane told Inside Soap's Allison Maund that naturally both men cheat at the tasks, but Solomon is "craftier" and wins three of the challenges, as well as Zak's house. Solomon moves in straight away forcing Zak, his wife Lisa Dingle (Jane Cox), and their daughter Belle Dingle (Emily Mather) to move into his camper van. Shane commented "He does have a heart – that's why he puts them in the camper van! But I think that if it hadn't been for little Belle they'd have been out on the street." Solomon eventually gives his newly won title to Sam, and Shane said it was because Solomon likes Sam, but he is also using him.

Solomon serves time in prison alongside Zak's son, Sam. He arrives in the village for the 10th anniversary of the Dingles being in Emmerdale. Zak and Solomon had been rivals for many years and compete for the title "Dingle King", which Solomon wins by cheating. This forces Zak and his family to live in Solomon's caravan. However, Solomon soon abdicates his title to Sam, hoping to drive Zak and Sam apart. However, this did not happen and Solomon leaves the village.

== Mystic Dingle ==
Mystic Dingle
- Emmerdale character
- Portrayed by: Simon Cassidy
- Appears in: 19 October 2004
- Introduced by: Keith Richardson
In-universe information
- Occupation: Fortune Teller
- Father: Solomon Dingle
- Brothers: Adam Dingle; Smudge Dingle; Moses Dingle
- Grandfathers: Bert Dingle
- Grandmothers: Jessie Dingle
- Uncles: Obadiah Dingle; Elvis Dingle
- First cousins: Charity Tate
- Other relatives: Jedediah Dingle; Zak Dingle; Shadrach Dingle; Albert Dingle; Caleb Dingle; Ezra Dingle

Mystic Dingle, played by Simon Cassidy, was a fortune teller and the son of Solomon Dingle (Paul Shane), who appeared in October 2004 alongside his father for the 10th anniversary of his cousin, Zak Dingle's (Steve Halliwell) family residing in Emmerdale. Being a fortune teller, he correctly predicted many of the Dingles' fortunes, including the outcome of a fight between Zak and Solomon. He lives in Donegal in Ireland.

On 1 October 2024, 20 years after his appearance, Mystic was mentioned again after Belle Dingle (Eden Taylor-Draper) attacked her husband, Thomas King (James Chase) with an axe in self-defence. Belle's half-brother, Sam Dingle (James Hooton) and his wife, Lydia Dingle (Karen Blick) had arranged with Mystic that Belle would flee the village and live with him in Donegal. Belle however, decided to confess to the police what had happened.

== Jon Dingle ==
Jon Dingle
- Emmerdale character
- Portrayed by: Lucy Webb
- Duration: 2004, 2006–2007
- First appearance: 20 October 2004
- Last appearance: 13 July 2007
- Introduced by: Keith Richardson
In-universe information
- Mother: Lilith Dingle
- Half-brothers: Luke Dingle; Matthew Dingle; Mark Dingle
- Grandfathers: Zebediah Dingle
- Grandmothers: Colleen Dingle
- Aunts: Del Dingle
- Other relatives: Marlon Dingle; Zak Dingle

Jon Dingle is the youngest child and only daughter of Lilith Dingle (Amanda Hennessy). She appeared in 2004, and from 2006 to 2007.

Jon first visits Emmerdale in October 2004 for a Dingle family celebration to mark their 10th anniversary of living in the village. Her mother Lilith then leaves Jon and her brothers to live with her cousin Marlon Dingle (Mark Charnock) for a month. Jon returns in 2006 when Lilith leaves her children with Marlon and his wife Donna (Verity Rushworth) while she goes away to work. Days later, Lilith is arrested for armed robbery.

Marlon tells social services that he is having difficulties looking after them, so it is agreed that they will go and stay with a foster family. They are soon informed that the children have gone missing and are found in a nearby woodland. The following day, they are taken into foster care. Marlon and Donna desperately try to get the children back but first have to find suitable accommodation. This finally happens when they buy Tall Tree Cottage, and the children move in on 5 July. However, the case against their mother collapses and on 13 July 2007, she takes them to Ireland, much to Donna and Marlon's distress.

== Lilith Dingle ==
Lilith Dingle
- Emmerdale character
- Portrayed by: Amanda Hennessy
- Duration: 2004, 2006–2007
- First appearance: 20 October 2004
- Last appearance: 13 July 2007
- Introduced by: Keith Richardson
In-universe information
- Father: Zebediah Dingle
- Mother: Colleen Dingle
- Sisters: Del Dingle
- Sons: Luke Dingle; Matthew Dingle; Mark Dingle
- Daughters: Jon Dingle
- Grandfathers: Jedediah Dingle
- Grandmothers: Peg Dingle
- Uncles: Zak Dingle; Albert Dingle; Shadrach Dingle; Caleb Dingle; Ezra Dingle
- First cousins: Ben Dingle; Butch Dingle; Cain Dingle; Sam Dingle; Tina Dingle; Belle Dingle; Marlon Dingle; Eli Dingle; Mandy Dingle; Chas Dingle; Genesis Walker

Lilith Dingle is the sister of Del Dingle (Hayley Tamaddon). She appeared in 2004, 2006 and 2007.

Lilith first visits Emmerdale in October 2004 for a Dingle family celebration to mark their 10th anniversary of living in the village. To pursue her singing career, she then leaves her four children - named after the Apostles - with her cousin Marlon Dingle (Mark Charnock) for a month before collecting them on 21 November. Lilith returns on 7 November 2006 when she leaves her four children with Marlon and his wife Donna (Verity Rushworth) while she goes away to work. Days later, Lilith is arrested for armed robbery and remanded in police custody. After months on remand, Lilith stands trial on 12 July 2007, and is freed when the case collapses after a prosecution witness collapses after being intimidated by Eli Dingle (Joseph Gilgun). The following day she takes her four children to Ireland with her, much to Donna and Marlon's distress.

== Luke Dingle ==
Luke Dingle
- Emmerdale character
- Portrayed by: Dean McGonagle
- Duration: 2004, 2006–2007
- First appearance: 20 October 2004
- Last appearance: 13 July 2007
- Introduced by: Keith Richardson
In-universe information
- Mother: Lilith Dingle
- Half-brothers: Matthew Dingle; Mark Dingle
- Half-sisters: Jon Dingle
- Grandfathers: Zebediah Dingle
- Grandmothers: Colleen Dingle
- Aunts: Del Dingle
- Other relatives: Marlon Dingle; Zak Dingle

Luke Dingle is the eldest son of Lilith Dingle (Amanda Hennessy). He appeared in 2004, and from 2006 to 2007.

Luke first visits Emmerdale in October 2004 for a Dingle family celebration to mark their 10th anniversary of living in the village. His mother Lilith then leaves Luke and his siblings to live with her cousin Marlon Dingle (Mark Charnock) for a month. Luke returns in 2006 when Lilith leaves her children with Marlon and his wife Donna (Verity Rushworth) while she goes away to work. Days later, Lilith is arrested for armed robbery. On his first day at Hotten Comprehensive School, Luke gets into a fight with Victoria Sugden (Isabel Hodgins) after she makes a remark about his mother being in custody.

Marlon tells Social Services that he is having difficulties looking after them, so its agreed that they will go and stay with a foster family. They are soon informed that the children have gone missing, and are soon found in a nearby woodland. The following day they are taken into foster care. Marlon and Donna desperately try to get the children back but first have to find suitable accommodation. This finally happens when they buy Tall Tree Cottage, and the children move in with them on 5 July. However, the case against their mother collapses and on 13 July 2007 she takes them all to Ireland with her, much to Donna and Marlon's distress.

== Mark Dingle ==
Mark Dingle
- Emmerdale character
- Portrayed by: Cormac Golden (2004); Joe Manuel (2006–2007)
- Duration: 2004, 2006–2007
- First appearance: 20 October 2004
- Last appearance: 13 July 2007
- Introduced by: Keith Richardson
In-universe information
- Mother: Lilith Dingle
- Brothers: Matthew Dingle
- Half-brothers: Luke Dingle
- Half-sisters: Jon Dingle
- Grandfathers: Zebediah Dingle
- Grandmothers: Colleen Dingle
- Aunts: Del Dingle
- Other relatives: Marlon Dingle; Zak Dingle

Mark Dingle is one of Lilith Dingle's (Amanda Hennessy) twin sons. He appeared in 2004, and from 2006 to 2007.

Mark first visits Emmerdale in October 2004 for a Dingle family celebration to mark their 10th anniversary of living in the village, leaving on his eighth birthday on 21 November 2004. His mother Lilith then leaves Mark and his siblings to live with her cousin Marlon Dingle (Mark Charnock) for a month. Mark returns in 2006 when Lilith leaves her children with Marlon and his wife Donna (Verity Rushworth) while she goes away to work. Days later, Lilith is arrested for armed robbery.

Marlon tells social services that he is having difficulties looking after them, so its agreed that they will go and stay with a foster family. They are soon informed that the children have gone missing, but they are soon found in a nearby woodland. The following day they are taken into foster care. Marlon and Donna desperately try to get the children back but first have to find suitable accommodation. This finally happens when they buy Tall Tree Cottage, and the children move in with them on 5 July. However, the case against their mother collapses and on 13 July 2007 she takes them all to Ireland with her, much to Donna and Marlon's distress.

== Matthew Dingle ==
Matthew Dingle
- Emmerdale character
- Portrayed by: Cillian McCormack (2004); Joshua Chamberlain (2006–2007)
- Duration: 2004, 2006–2007
- First appearance: 20 October 2004
- Last appearance: 13 July 2007
- Introduced by: Keith Richardson
In-universe information
- Mother: Lilith Dingle
- Brothers: Mark Dingle
- Half-brothers: Luke Dingle
- Half-sisters: Jon Dingle
- Grandfathers: Zebediah Dingle
- Grandmothers: Colleen Dingle
- Aunts: Del Dingle
- Other relatives: Marlon Dingle; Zak Dingle

Matthew Dingle is one of Lilith Dingle's (Amanda Hennessy) twin sons. He appeared in 2004, and from 2006 to 2007.

Matthew first visits Emmerdale in October 2004 for a Dingle family celebration to mark their 10th anniversary of living in the village, leaving on his eighth birthday on 21 November 2004. His mother Lilith then leaves Matthew and his siblings to live with her cousin Marlon Dingle (Mark Charnock) for a month. Matthew returns in 2006 when Lilith leaves her children with Marlon and his wife Donna (Verity Rushworth) while she goes away to work. Days later, Lilith is arrested for armed robbery.

Marlon tells social services that he is having difficulties looking after them, so its agreed that they will go and stay with a foster family. They are soon informed that the children have gone missing and are found in a nearby woodland. The following day they are taken into foster care. Marlon and Donna desperately try to get the children back but first have to find suitable accommodation. This finally happens when they buy Tall Tree Cottage, and the children move in with them on 5 July. However, the case against their mother collapses and on 13 July 2007 she takes them all to Ireland with her, much to Donna and Marlon's distress.

== Helen Dyson ==
Helen Dyson
- Emmerdale character
- Portrayed by: Shirley Dixon
- Duration: 2004–2007
- First appearance: 23 November 2004
- Last appearance: 20 February 2007
- Introduced by: Keith Richardson
In-universe information
- Husband: Roger Dyson (until 2004)
- Daughters: Grace Andrews

Helen Dyson is a close friend of Tom King (Kenneth Farrington). Helen arrives with her husband Roger. Both of whom have been friends with Tom and his late wife Mary for many years. They arrive to visit Tom and fiancée Charity Tate (Emma Atkins) several weeks Helen sees Charity, much younger than Tom and with little taste for domestic life, as being unworthy of him. While they are cooking a meal together, Charity makes a remark about Helen's food being a heart attack in the making. Soon, they receive a phone call saying that Roger has died of a heart attack while playing golf, causing Helen to lash out at Charity.

Helen made her last appearance at Tom's funeral.

== Other characters ==
Character	Episode date(s)	Actor	Circumstances
Niamh O'Connor	11 June - 29 December	Tracey Moore	The fiancée of Ethan Blake (Liam O'Brien). After dating for several years, Ethan and Niamh become engaged. However, their different views of the world lead to significant differences between them. Niamh spends some time travelling, and visits Ethan during a break from travelling. When, during her visit, Ethan learns she wants to return to Malawi, they decide to go their separate ways - in spite of their love for each other. Months later, Niamh returns to Emmerdale on a surprise visit. However, Ethan is out of the village at the time visiting friends and he can not be contacted. She leaves the village several days later, missing Ethan, who returns shortly afterwards.
Bonnie Meredith	19 August - 30 May 2005	Viktoria Kay	The sister of Simon Meredith (Dale Meeks) and daughter of Lesley Meredith (Sherrie Hewson). She appears working at the fish quays in Scarborough with Simon and their mother, Lesley when Simon's girlfriend Nicola Blackstock (Nicola Wheeler) confronts Simon over his supposed affair with Tash Abbott. Bonnie falls for Marlon Dingle (Mark Charnock) and they share a kiss. Bonnie arrives in the village telling Simon that Lesley has torn a ligament in her arm and she is tired of looking after her and insists Simon looks after her and suggests Lesley moves in with Simon and Nicola, much to their displeasure.
Daniel Dingle	18–20 October	Uncredited	The nine-year-old son of Elvis Dingle and Marilyn Dingle, who arrives in the village with his parents and younger brother Brando Dingle for the tenth anniversary of the Dingle family living in Emmerdale.
Brando Dingle	19 October	Jack Bomiemead	The five-month-old son of Elvis Dingle and Marilyn Dingle, who arrives in the village with his parents and younger brother Daniel Dingle for the tenth anniversary of the Dingle family living in Emmerdale.
Roger Dyson	23–24 November	Malcolm Terris	A close friend of Tom King (Kenneth Farrington), who arrives with his wife Helen, both of whom have been friends with Tom and his late wife Mary for many years. They arrive to visit Tom and his fiancée Charity Tate (Emma Atkins) several weeks before the planned wedding. Roger suffers from chest pains, which he does not take very seriously. The day after arriving, he collapses while playing golf with Tom and his sons. He is rushed to hospital but dies. Tom becomes depressed by the death of an old friend.
Enzo Bianchi	30 November - 1 December	Daniel D’Alessandro	Paul Lambert's (Matthew Bose) boyfriend, who owned a wine bar in Sorrento, Italy. Paul returns to Sorrento in late October 2004 to try and mend their relationship. Shortly after Paul's return, Enzo travels to Emmerdale and tells Paul he wants to end their relationship. Reluctantly, Paul agrees and they finalize who gets what and Enzo returns home.
Gianni Bianchi	12–13 December	Andonis Anthony	The fake boyfriend for Val Lambert (Charlie Hardwick), who she brings to Emmerdale as part of a "Christmas visit" and tells everyone that they are getting married but Gianni leaves the next day. Val says he had dumped her because she was too old to have children. However, Paul saw Val give Gianni money before he left and forces Val to admit that she made the whole thing up to get sympathy.
