= List of Emmerdale characters introduced in 2002 =

The following is a list of characters that first appeared in the British soap opera Emmerdale in 2002, by order of first appearance.

== Elvis Dingle ==
Elvis Dingle
- Emmerdale character
- Portrayed by: Martin Walsh
- Duration: 2002, 2004
- First appearance: 24 January 2002
- Last appearance: 20 October 2004
- Introduced by: Steve Frost
In-universe information
- Father: Bert Dingle
- Mother: Jessie Dingle
- Brothers: Solomon Dingle; Obadiah Dingle
- Wife: Marilyn Dingle (1994—)
- Sons: Daniel Dingle; Brando Dingle
- Grandfathers: Jedediah Dingle
- Uncles: Jedediah Dingle
- Nieces: Charity Dingle
- First cousins: Zak Dingle; Shadrach Dingle; Albert Dingle; Caleb Dingle; Ezra Dingle; Zebediah Dingle
- Other relatives: Marlon Dingle; Eli Dingle; Butch Dingle; Ben Dingle; Tina Dingle; Sam Dingle; Cain Dingle; Chas Dingle; Belle Dingle; Del Dingle; Lilith Dingle; Mandy Dingle

Elvis Dingle is the cousin of Zak Dingle (Steve Halliwell), who is married to Marilyn. He first appears in the village in 2002, when they leave Zak's mother Peg with Zak at Wishing Well Cottage before quickly leaving Emmerdale. By July 2002, Zak had had enough of her and concocted a plan to return her to Elvis and Marilyn by telling them that she had won a large sum of money in a prize draw, with Rodney Blackstock (Patrick Mower) as the prizegiver. This failed when they recognised Rodney in the photo and realised it was a con. They also tried faking Peg's death with a coffin and a fake wake, but this also failed.

Elvis, Marilyn and their sons, Brando Dingle and Daniel Dingle, return in October 2004 to join Zak and his family celebrate their 10th anniversary of living in Emmerdale. Elvis is mentioned in 2014 on the day of Cain Dingle (Jeff Hordley) and Moira Barton's (Natalie J Robb) wedding.

== Marilyn Dingle ==
Marilyn Dingle
- Emmerdale character
- Portrayed by: Morag Siller
- Duration: 2002, 2004
- First appearance: 24 January 2002
- Last appearance: 20 October 2004
- Introduced by: Steve Frost
In-universe information
- Husband: Elvis Dingle (1994—)
- Sons: Daniel Dingle; Brando Dingle

Marilyn Dingle is the wife of Elvis Dingle. She first appears in Emmerdale in 2002 when they arrive at Wishing Well Cottage unexpectedly to leave Zak Dingle's (Steve Halliwell) mother Peg with Zak before quickly leaving Emmerdale. Much to his horror, Zak Dingle didn't get along with his mother.

In May 2004, Marilyn gives birth to a son, Brando Dingle . The following October, Elvis and Marilyn return to Emmerdale with their nine-year-old son, Daniel Dingle and five-month-old Brando, to attend a party at Wishing Well Cottage celebrating Zak's family living in Emmerdale for ten years.

== Peg Dingle ==
Peg Dingle
- Emmerdale character
- Portrayed by: Jeanne Hepple
- First appearance: 24 January 2002
- Last appearance: 19 July 2002
- Introduced by: Steve Frost
In-universe information
- Husband: Jedediah Dingle (1945–2002)
- Sons: Zak Dingle; Shadrach Dingle; Albert Dingle; Caleb Dingle; Ezra Dingle; Zebediah Dingle
- Grandsons: Nathan Dingle; Ben Dingle; Butch Dingle; Cain Dingle; Sam Dingle; Marlon Dingle; Eli Dingle
- Granddaughters: Tina Dingle; Belle Dingle; Chas Dingle; Gennie Walker; Del Dingle; Mandy Dingle; Lilith Dingle
- Other relatives: Aaron Livesy; Molly Sharma; Debbie Dingle; Kyle Dingle; Samson Dingle; April Windsor; Sarah Sugden; Jack Sugden; Grace Dingle; Eve Dingle

Molly Mairead "Peg" Dingle is the mother of Zak Dingle. She appeared in 2002.

Peg first appears on 24 January 2002 when Zak's cousins Elvis and Marilyn Dingle dropped her off on him, having had enough of her. Initially, Zak tries to pass off her to other relatives, including Charity and her husband Chris Tate. She briefly lives in a caravan outside Zak's house, but this burns down. Peg and Zak have a difficult relationship, and in March he accuses her of murdering his father Jed. She tells him that Jed had walked out on his family when Zak was young.

In April 2002, Peg sets her sights on Alan Turner and moves into the "Grange Bed and Breakfast", and drives away his customers. To drive Peg away, Alan pretends to be gay and in a relationship with Rodney Blackstock. Peg then moves back in with Zak, and in July Elvis arrives to collect Peg and take her away. Peg telephoned Zak to say she is in Africa.

== Syd Woolfe ==
Syd Woolfe
- Emmerdale character
- Portrayed by: Nathan Gladwell
- Duration: 2002–2004
- First appearance: 25 March 2002
- Last appearance: 25 November 2004
- Introduced by: Steve Frost
In-universe information
- Occupation: Builder

Sydney "Syd" Woolfe, played by Nathan Gladwell., made his first on-screen appearance on 25 March 2002 and departed on 25 November 2004. Prior to receiving the role of Syd, Gladwell had previously starred in hairdressing drama Cutting It. On the day Gladwell received the role, he flew out to New Zealand on holiday and started the day he got back. He said: "They e- mailed me the script and I flew home, jet-lagged to hell and started my first day at Emmerdale. "I had to use a circular saw and was convinced they were trying to kill me. I didn't know what day it was, I could hardly keep my eyes open and was put in charge of this very dangerous blade. It wasn't my finest hour." One of Syd's earliest storylines is a love triangle with Scott Windsor (Ben Freeman) and Chloe Atkinson (Amy Nuttall). "I'd be lying if I said it hasn't been fun, But what can you do? You've just got to get on with it." Of his character, Gladwell said "You could never leave Syd in the house with your girlfriend because he'd be trying it on like mad no matter how good a mate you were. But he's likeable. He's not someone you hate. He added "I was going to say you wouldn't trust him with your life, but you probably would - you just wouldn't trust him with your wife." Gladwell was initially contracted until December.

Syd works alongside Jerry "Mack" MacKinley (Rob Dixon). Upon his arrival, Syd catches the attention of many female residents, due to his good looks and his charming nature. Syd moves in with local mechanic Scott Windsor and his girlfriend Chloe Atkinson. After Mack leaves the village, Syd remains to continue working. He becomes Scott's best friend but finds himself attracted to Chloe. He decides to keep his feelings to himself but has casual relationships with Angie Reynolds (Freya Copeland) and Nicola Blackstock (Nicola Wheeler). However, eventually Syd and Chloe also start having sex. Chloe is nanny to Jean Tate (Megan Pearson) but neglects her so she and Syd can have sex. Jean falls from her car seat and lands on the kitchen floor. Syd and Chloe cover up any signs of an accident as Jean does not appear injured, but she becomes very irritable and cries a lot, and eventually Zoe takes her to hospital when she develops a fever. This is soon treated, but x-rays show that Jean has partially healed broken ribs. The hospital calls Social Services, who tell Zoe that she cannot remove Jean from hospital unless Zoe can give a reasonable explanation about how Jean was injured. The truth is revealed and Scott's friendship with Syd breaks down. Syd continues to see Chloe but they break up after a number of arguments and Syd and Scott reconcile their friendship.

After forming a friendship with Chas Dingle (Lucy Pargeter), Syd develops feelings for her and takes her on holiday for a couple of nights. He is unhappy when Chas begins seeing Carl King. Scott asks Syd to help him find convicted rapist Frank Bernard Hartbourne (Rob Parry), after Scott's sister, Donna Windsor (Verity Rushworth), is left traumatized when he approaches her to help fix her Scooter. They find Frank and Scott beats him severely. The police get involved and Syd and Scott face criminal charges, but Scott refuses to admit beating Frank, leaving Syd shocked. Syd, wracked with guilt, admits that he was involved and is let off with a caution.

Syd and Scott then fall out again, effectively ending their friendship. Not long after, Syd is offered a job in Manchester and is indecisive about leaving. He declares his feelings for Chas, and decides to take the job when she rejects him. Before leaving, he says goodbye to Edna Birch (Shirley Stelfox) and Scott offers his hand in apology, but Syd rejects it and spits on his shoes in response to his recent behaviour. Syd then says a tearful farewell to Chas before leaving for Manchester.

== Jerry "Mack" Mackinley ==
Jerry 'Mack' Mackinley
- Emmerdale character
- Portrayed by: Rob Dixon
- Duration: 2002–2003
- First appearance: 25 March 2002
- Last appearance: 16 April 2003
- Introduced by: Steve Frost
In-universe information
- Occupation: Builder

Mack and Syd Woolfe turned up in the village in March 2002, to work on Café Hope, the café Viv Hope was wanting to open in the village. Viv, who had recently been fighting with her husband Bob, instantly tried to make Bob jealous by turning on her charm. Mack later had a date with Diane Blackstock, and at the start was not too happy about Diane’s plans for a relationship. After a talk about their relationship, Diane felt upset after Mack’s rejection, but soon he regretted his decision, after Brian started to get designs on Diane, and tried to get back with her.

In May 2002 Mack moved into the B&B, partly to be closer to Diane. But later Mack started to get worried again, wondering if he and Diane were getting a little too serious with nights in. Syd, not to keen on the idea of Mack and Diane, tried to break them up by inviting an ex of Mack’s, Miranda, to go out with him, Mack and another girl on a double date.

After a series of misunderstandings, reconciliations and other things too Mack and Diane finally parted ways. Now free and single, Mack and Syd bet over which of them would sleep with Angie Reynolds first. Syd managed to sleep with Angie first. In 2003 Mack slept with Nicola Blackstock, after telling her that he loved her – just a trick to get her into bed.

Then not too long after that Mack moved in with Syd, Scott Windsor and Chloe Atkinson but was kicked out after Syd found out that Mack had been trying to take over his job.

== Edith Weatherall ==
Edith Weatherall
- Emmerdale character
- Portrayed by: Elizabeth Kelly
- First appearance: 5 June 2002
- Last appearance: 13 September 2002
- Introduced by: Steve Frost
In-universe information
- Father: Albert Bradshaw
- Sisters: Elsie Bradshaw

Edith Weatherall, portrayed by Elizabeth Kelly, was a lady who befriended Tricia Dingle (Sheree Murphy) when her husband Marlon Dingle (Mark Charnock) renovated her house. She first appeared in June 2002 and Kelly was known for her previous role on BBC soap opera EastEnders as series regular, Nellie Ellis. Tricia subsequently invited her to stay with her and Marlon until her house was finished. She then moved back home and died the following day.

Tricia and Marlon were then surprised to find out that Edith had left them her belongings and house in her will. However, when they met Edith's sister Elsie Bradshaw (Olive Pendleton) at Edith's funeral, it turned out that house actually belonged to her. Builders Jerry Mackinley (Rob Dixon) and Syd Woolfe (Nathan Gladwell) charged over the average price for the work they did on the house, which Tricia and Marlon couldn't afford. They tried to convince Elsie to pay for the work but weren't unsuccessful.

== Caroline Addyman ==
Caroline Addyman
- Emmerdale character
- Portrayed by: Daryl Fishwick
- Duration: 2002, 2004, 2006
- First appearance: 19 June 2002
- Last appearance: 23 March 2006
- Introduced by: Steve Frost (2002); Kathleen Beedles (2006)
In-universe information
- Husband: Brian Addyman (divorced); Graham
- Sons: Sam Addyman
- Daughters: Katie Addyman; Jodie Addyman

Caroline Kershaw (also Addyman), played by Daryl Fishwick, is the estranged mother of Katie Sugden (Sammy Winward) and ex-wife of Brian Addyman (Martin Reeve). Katie was brought up by Brian after their divorce.

Caroline first appeared in 2002, when Katie goes to stay with her after she discovers she's pregnant with her boyfriend, Andy Sugden's (Kelvin Fletcher) baby. Andy asks her to have an abortion, despite the pregnancy being planned. After suffering a miscarriage, Katie returns to stay with Brian. Caroline returns in 2004 for Katie's wedding to Andy, whom she reconciled with.

Caroline returned in March 2006 to visit Katie in hospital after she was injured in a car accident in which her father was killed. Caroline attempts to convince Katie to move to Greece with her but Katie refuses and decides to remain in Emmerdale.

== Melanie Say ==
Melanie Say
- Emmerdale character
- Portrayed by: Kelli Hollis
- First appearance: 15 July 2002
- Last appearance: 12 November 2002
- Introduced by: Steve Frost

Melanie Say, portrayed by Kelli Hollis, was a fellow patient where Zoe Tate (Leah Bracknell) was being sectioned. The two ladies struck up a friendship, which became strained when Zoe was transferred to a private clinic in August 2002. They reconnected in November 2002 when Mel discovered that Zoe was pregnant with Jean Tate and offered to go to antinatal classes with her.

Mel was Hollis' first role in Emmerdale as she returned nine years later in 2011 when she was cast as Ali Spencer.

== Jarvis Skelton ==
Jarvis Skelton
- Emmerdale character
- Portrayed by: Richard Moore
- Duration: 2002–2005
- First appearance: 15 November 2002
- Last appearance: 4 December 2005
- Introduced by: Steve Frost
In-universe information
- Occupation: Dustman

Jarvis Skelton played by Richard Moore, made his first appearance on 15 November 2002. A write from The Lancashire Telegraph described Jarvis as "An eccentric Binman".

Jarvis first appears in Emmerdale in the village in November 2002 as a binman. He butts heads with Edna Birch (Shirley Stelfox) over refuse collection but they soon become friends. Jarvis also becomes friends with Len Reynolds (Peter Martin). The following month he researches Edna's family tree, and inadvertently reveals Edna's grandmother to have been a prostitute, upsetting her. In February 2003, Jarvis reveals to his lifelong dancing partner Freda Danby (Lyn Paul) that he is in love with her, but she rejects him, which upsets him. Jarvis later gets a job at Tate Haulage in 2003 working for Zoe Tate. Working there, he grows close to Sam Dingle (James Hooton), a young member of the notorious Dingle family, and son of Zak Dingle (Steve Halliwell). However, in 2004, Tate Haulage business executive frames Sam for stealing alcohol from the company. Angry at Sam's unfair justice, Jarvis hands in his resignation from Tate Haulage. Jarvis then gets a job at King's Haulage, but dislikes his boss Tom King (Kenneth Farrington), who is also the father of Carl King, who assisted Scott Windsor in framing Sam for the stolen whiskey. In late 2005, Freda returns to the village and offers Jarvis the chance to leave Emmerdale to live with her in Spain. After believing Freda is playing games at first, Jarvis eventually accepts and he and Freda leave Emmerdale to start a new life in Spain on 4 December 2005. When Len dies of a heart attack in 2007, Jarvis and Freda send flowers to the funeral.

== Jedediah Dingle ==
Jedediah Dingle
- Emmerdale character
- Portrayed by: Richard Mayes
- Appears on: 17 December 2002
- Introduced by: Steve Frost
In-universe information
- Father: Jonah Dingle
- Mother: Dot Dingle
- Brothers: Bert Dingle
- Sisters: Maud Dingle
- Wife: Peg Dingle (1945-2002)
- Sons: Zak Dingle; Shadrach Dingle; Albert Dingle; Caleb Dingle; Ezra Dingle; Zebediah Dingle
- Grandsons: Nathan Dingle; Butch Dingle; Ben Dingle; Cain Dingle; Sam Dingle; Marlon Dingle; Eli Dingle
- Granddaughters: Chas Dingle; Tina Dingle; Mandy Dingle; Gennie Walker; Lilith Dingle; Del Dingle; Belle Dingle
- Nephews: Obadiah Dingle; Solomon Dingle; Elvis Dingle
- Nieces: Mantha Dingle
- Other relatives: Charity Dingle; Aaron Dingle; Molly Sharma; Debbie Dingle; Kyle Dingle; Samson Dingle; Mark Dingle; Luke Dingle; Jon Dingle; Matthew Dingle; Marilyn Dingle; Noah Dingle; Sarah Sugden; Jack Sugden

Jedediah "Jed" Dingle is the estranged father of Zak Dingle (Steve Halliwell), Shadrach Dingle (Andy Devine) and Albert Dingle (Bobby Knutt). He appears on 17 December 2002, when he tells Zak that he has a lost fortune in Chile. Jed then dies and Zak goes off to Chile in search of the fortune.

Jed was born in Beckindale (later renamed Emmerdale) in 1921 and married Peg in 1945 and their eldest son, Albert was born in 1946, followed by five more sons. In 1960, when Zak was eight years old, Peg and Jed had an argument. Zak was in bed, but he heard them both shouting at one another. The next day, Zak noticed dry blood on the floor and no signs of his father. Peg told him that he had suddenly died, when he actually walked out on the family. Zak had always wondered about the blood on the floor, which was revealed to be Jed hitting Peg with an ornament before walking out.
