= Shadow of the Noose =

British television serial

- Genre: Legal drama Biographical drama
- Created by: Richard Cooper
- Directed by: Sebastian Graham Jones; Matthew Robinson
- Starring: Jonathan Hyde; Michael Feast; Leslee Udwin; Terry Taplin; Trevor Ray; Julian Firth; Gary Files; Phil McCall; Richard Moore
- Country of origin: United Kingdom
- Original language: English
- No. of series: 1
- No. of episodes: 8 (list of episodes)

Production
- Executive producer: Colin Rogers
- Producer: Colin Tucker
- Running time: 60 minutes
- Production company: BBC Productions

Original release
- Network: BBC Two
- Release: 1 March – 19 April 1989

Shadow of the Noose is a BBC television legal drama serial about the life and career of barrister Sir Edward Marshall Hall. It starred Jonathan Hyde as Marshall Hall; Michael Feast as his clerk, Edgar Bowker; Leslee Udwin as Henriette Marshall Hall; and Terry Taplin as solicitor Arthur Newton. All eight episodes were written by Richard Cooper, produced by Colin Tucker, and first transmitted between 1 March and 19 April 1989 on BBC Two. It was a co-production with the Australian Broadcasting Corporation and Television New Zealand.

== Main cast ==
- Jonathan Hyde as Edward Marshall Hall
- Michael Feast as Edgar Bowker
- Leslee Udwin as Henriette Marshall Hall
- Terry Taplin as Arthur Newton
- Trevor Ray as Harry Bishop
- Julian Firth as Wellesley Orr
- Gary Files as Mr. Justice Wills
- Phil McCall as Mr. Jackson, Judge's Clerk
- Richard Moore as Sir Charles Matthews

== Episode list ==
No.	Title	Directed by	Written by	Original release date
1	"An Alien Shore"	Sebastian Graham-Jones	Richard Cooper	1 March 1989
London, 1894. After the brief is refused by a number of other barristers, Edward Marshall Hall takes on the seemingly impossible defence of Marie Hermann (Victoria Fairbrother), an Austrian prostitute accused of killing one of her clients.
2	"Noblesse Oblige"	Sebastian Graham-Jones	Richard Cooper	8 March 1989
After a period of illness, Marshall Hall needs a case to both bring in much-needed funds, and to re-establish himself in the public eye. Reluctantly he agrees to represent Lady Scott (Siân Phillips) in a criminal libel action brought by Lord Russell (Christopher Lang), the husband of her daughter, Lady Mabel (Amanda Elwes), having accused him of being homosexual. This horrifies Marshall Hall's fiancée, Henriette Froeger (Leslee Udwin).
3	"Gone for a Soldier"	Sebastian Graham-Jones	Richard Cooper	15 March 1989
Lady Frances Fairbrother (Mary Conlon) engages Arthur Newton to arrange the defence of her maid, Annie Dyer (Natalie Forbes), who is accused of killing her baby, who was actually the illegitimate child of Lady Frances's husband, Captain James Fairbrother (David Rintoul). Bowker (Michael Feast) tries to decline the brief, fearing it will bring back memories of Marshall Hall's unhappy marriage to Ethel (Irina Brook), who died during a botched illegal abortion after an affair with Lieutenant de Ponthieu (Tim McInnerny).
4	"Beside the Seaside"	Sebastian Graham-Jones	Richard Cooper	22 March 1989
Marshall Hall defends womaniser and conman Herbert Bennett (Vincenzo Ricotta), who is accused of murdering his estranged wife, Mary (Caroline Quentin), at Great Yarmouth.
5	"Gun in Hand"	Matthew Robinson	Richard Cooper	29 March 1989
Marshall Hall travels to the Black Country to defend Edward Lawrence (David Bradley), a wealthy and popular brewer accused of killing his mistress, Ruth Hadley (Nicola Duffett).
6	"Turn Again"	Matthew Robinson	Richard Cooper	5 April 1989
The actress Hettie Chattell (Sian Thomas) believes she has been libeled by gossip printed in the Daily Mail, but when Marshall Hall agrees to represent her - and wins - he incurs the wrath of the newspaper's owner, Alfred Harmsworth (David Schofield).
7	"The Camden Town Murder"	Matthew Robinson	Richard Cooper	12 April 1989
Marshall Hall defends Robert Wood (Peter Capaldi), accused of murdering Emily "Phylis" Dimmock in the case that became known as the Camden Town Murder.
8	"Sentence of Death"	Matthew Robinson	Richard Cooper	19 April 1989
Having successfully defended the flamboyant publisher Horatio Bottomley (Phil Rose) against a charge of fraud, Marshall Hall is offered the brief for Hawley Harvey Crippen (David Hatton), accused of murdering his wife .

== Tie-in novel ==
A novel by Cooper, also called Shadow of the Noose, was published at the time the series was transmitted. The narrative of the novel mainly comprises a vast expansion of the story of Marshall Hall's first marriage to Ethel and her subsequent death, as featured in Gone for a Soldier. The book ends with the Marie Hermann case from An Alien Shore.

== Home media ==
Although the complete series was never released on commercial home video, An Alien Shore and Gun in Hand appeared on Vol. 1 Nos. 3 and 8 of BBC Video World, a fortnightly subscription-only service, primarily for expatriates, issued in May and July 1989 respectively. The complete series was released on DVD in early 2017.
