= Chloe Atkinson =

Fictional character from Emmerdale

- Emmerdale character
- Portrayed by: Amy Nuttall
- Duration: 2000–2005
- First appearance: 4 December 2000
- Last appearance: 25 March 2005
- Introduced by: Keith Richardson
In-universe information
- Mother: Margaret Atkinson

Chloe Atkinson is a fictional character from the British ITV soap opera Emmerdale, played by Amy Nuttall. She debuted on-screen during the episode airing on 4 December 2000. Nuttall quit the soap in order to pursue a singing career and her last appearance aired on 25 March 2005.

== Character casting and development ==
Nuttall was eighteen when she was cast in the role. Whilst interviewed by the Metro, Atkinson has stated that she didn't get Chloe's maneater label, adding: "It's funny because all my headlines include the word 'maneater' and I have only snogged two, no three, members of the cast on-screen. [...] I'm a bit fed up of being called a soap siren." Nuttall would sometimes get stopped in the street by viewers shouting at her regarding Chloe's behaviour. On Chloe's sexy image, Nuttall believed that she did not wear "outrageously sexy clothes". She was also thankful that the costume department never gave her mini skirts to wear.

Chloe begins a relationship with Scott Windsor (Ben Freeman). Off-screen Nuttall and Freeman were in a relationship. The actress told Ruki Sayid from the Daily Mirror that when they filmed Chloe and Scott's first kiss, the director guessed that they were romantically involved. One storyline depicts Chloe starting an affair with Scott's best friend Syd Woolfe (Nathan Gladwell). Chloe becomes annoyed with Scott's illegal car scam business. Syd then orchestrates the affair after he lodges in Chloe and Scott's home. When Scott discovers their infidelity he rages at Chloe. But Gladwell told Steve Hendry from the Sunday Mail that "There's no doubt he blames Syd". Nuttall viewed it as her first notable storyline. She was also pleased to portray "a bit of naughtiness" that saw Chloe drop her "Miss Goody-Two-Shoes" image. The actress found intimate bedroom scenes with Gladwell challenging to film because of the crew and her romance with Freeman. The actress revealed to an Inside Soap reporter that it was her "magic moment" because she found it "fun". She also liked that there were "lots of argument scenes" and the chance to slap Freeman.

In March 2004, Nuttall told Alex Tate from The People that Chloe would be embroiled in many storylines. She explained that her character would become "much naughtier". Chloe begins by falsely accusing Syd of beating her up and developing an attraction to another character. Nuttall added that "in fact, she becomes a bit of a gold digger."

In August 2004, it was announced that Nuttall quit Emmerdale to pursue a singing career and raise her profile. Her decision to quit followed a performance in front of 35,000 football fans at Old Trafford. She had wanted to leave the soap opera for some time, adding "I will have been playing Chloe for four years this Christmas and although Emmerdale has been a fantastic experience, I feel that it's time for something new." Nuttall later explained to Lynne Michelle of the Sunday Mirror that Chloe had transformed into a psycho and confused viewers believed that she behaved like Chloe. Teasing Chloe's departure, she stated that "I don't quite know how it's going to turn out for her but what goes around comes around, doesn't it? Chloe's got away with a lot and I hope she gets what she deserves." In her final scenes, Chloe is forced to leave the village when her deceit and lies are discovered. Nuttall was pleased with Chloe's exit. Producers did not want to kill the character off and told Nuttall she could return anytime she wanted.

== Storylines ==
Chloe arrives in December 2000 for an interview at Chez Marlon, run by Marlon Dingle (Mark Charnock), Kathy Glover (Malandra Burrows) and Rodney Blackstock (Patrick Mower). Tricia Stokes (Sheree Murphy) is unhappy at Chloe's arrival, jealous that Marlon likes her. Chloe makes friends instantly and gets on well with Charity Dingle (Emma Atkins), becoming her confidante. She is amazed when she learns about Charity's affair with Zoe Tate (Leah Bracknell). Charity and Chloe soon move in together. Zoe's brother and Charity's husband Chris (Peter Amory) annoys Chloe, as he tries to find out the identity of Charity's secret lover, but she does not reveal anything.

Chloe and Scott start dating and move in together during 2002. Chloe is delighted to learn than Scott is jealous of her and Marlon, even though there is nothing going on between them. When Syd moves in with Scott and Chloe, he begins causing trouble between them and sleeps with Chloe, leading to Scott breaking up with Chloe after finding out. She moved into Home Farm but got back with Scott in early 2003 after she felt sorry for Scott having to drink with his mother Viv Windsor (Deena Payne). Viv is unhappy about Scott reconciling with Chloe and sacks Chloe from the cafe. She later moves back in with Scott and Syd.

In Chloe's absence, Syd begins seeing Yolanda, a lap dancer from a club. Chloe is jealous of Syd and Yolanda's relationship as she still fancies Syd, and tries to resume their affair, despite being back with Scott. After Syd and Yolanda split up, Chloe begins flirting with him. Syd, however, is unsure about having an affair with Chloe again and rejects her initially. She later performs a lap dance for Syd. He arrives at Home Farm, while she was looking after Scott and Zoe's daughter, Jean (Megan Pearson), and they get passionate on the sofa, leaving Jean unattended. Jean falls to the floor, injuring herself. Chloe and Syd find her, but Chloe does not want to risk her job by going to the hospital. She hides Jean's injuries instead and lies to Syd about going to the hospital. Syd and Chloe's affair continued, but Zoe was worried about her daughter's constant crying while on holiday. Chloe passes it off as teething. Debbie Jones (Charley Webb), who babysits Jean, leaves her unattended and soon she is injured again for the second time in weeks. This accident is more serious and Jean is taken to the hospital and it looks as if she may not recover. After learning that Scott is Jean's father, Chloe breaks up with her. Zoe is accused of child abuse but is cleared after Syd confesses that Jean was not strapped into a car seat. As a result, Chloe loses her job.

Chloe and Syd later split and she makes him look bad by lying that he hit her. She then moves onto Carl King (Tom Lister), and they have a one-night stand when Carl and his girlfriend Chastity Dingle (Lucy Pargeter) fall out. Chloe is horrified when he returns to Chas. Chloe then schemes to get Carl by telling Chas he has been seeing his another woman and Carl's ex-wife Colleen was sending poison pen letters. The plan succeeds as Chas punches Colleen and Colleen tells Carl not to let Chas near their children. Chloe then begins working for Carl's family and flirts with his brother Jimmy (Nick Miles) and tries again with Carl, who was now single. They reunite and Chloe, desperate to hang onto him, invents a lie about being pregnant. Chas soon works out Chloe schemed to drive her and Carl apart. Chloe is then attacked by Chas who dunks her in a fountain, threatening to drown her unless she confesses. Chloe then admits she was never pregnant and leaves the village in disgrace on Good Friday 2005 and she is never seen, nor heard from again.

== Reception ==
For her portrayal of Chloe, Nuttall was nominated in the category of "Sexiest Female" at the 2005 British Soap Awards. Radio Times included Chloe on their feature profiling their favourite bunny boilers in soap opera. Of her duration they opined: "Mercenary and malicious, conniving Chloe caused mayhem in the Dales by having an affair with her boyfriend's best friend, endangering a baby's life, sending poison pen letters to herself and faking a pregnancy to ensnare a man." They also added: "With as much contempt for women as she had lust for men, Chloe was the very model of a treacherous woman." Victoria Kennedy of the Daily Mirror branded Chloe a "bitchy sex kitten". James Ellis of the Metro brands Chloe as a "man-eating character". Evening newspaper Yorkshire Evening Post brand Chloe a "gold digger" after her story lines involving the King brothers. Lorna Cooper of MSN TV listed Chloe of one of Soap Opera's "forgotten characters" and brand her love life as complicated because of her many unsuccessful relationships.

The Daily Mirror's Sayid branded Chloe as a "sizzling redhead with a supermodel figure" and "tarty". He described Chloe and Scott "warring soap couple [with] secrets of lust and betrayal". His colleague Victoria Kennedy titled her the "bitchy sex-kitten". Nikki Waldegrave from The People said that Chloe's transformation from "goody-goody shop girl into a vicious vixen" left viewers stunned. Michelle writing in the Sunday Mirror branded Chloe a "secretary-turned-superbitch " and "the Superbitch of Beckindale". She observed the character's greatest moments as being the neglect of baby Jean, pretending that Syd domestically abused her, ruining Carl and Chas's relationship and faking a pregnancy. Michelle concluded that in the event of infidelity: "Chloe would have boiled an entire warren of bunnies". Steven Smith from the publication labeled her a "feisty barmaid". John Dingwall of the Daily Record said that Chloe was "the white trash bitch of Emmerdale". A Virgin Media writer included Chloe and Chas' fight in their run down of "Soap's best catfights". Cath Bennett from the Daily Record said that Chloe sent "temperatures soaring" when her "sex drive running out of control in the summer sun" over Syd.
