= Diana Davies (actress) =

English actress

- Born: 20 July 1936 (age 90); Manchester, Lancashire, England

Diana Davies (born 20 July 1936) is an English actress, best known for playing roles in two long-running ITV soap operas: Norma Ford in Coronation Street and Caroline Bates in Emmerdale between 1984 and 1999.

== Career ==
Amongst her roles prior to becoming a regular in Emmerdale Farm, Davies portrayed three different characters in the retrospective educational drama How We Used To Live between 1969 and 1981, her characters being Mama (1969), Alice Boothroyd (1976) and Mabel Hodgkins (1981). She also appeared in The Liver Birds as Jenny and a recurring role in A Family at War (1970–72) as nurse Doris Jackson.

== Personal life ==
Davies divorced her husband, Peter, in 1979, with whom she had a son. She moved to Torquay in 2004 to live with her sister.
