= Marc Bolton =

British actor

- Born: Marc Andrew Bolton; 16 February 1968 (age 58); Durham, England

Marc Andrew Bolton (born 16 February 1968) is an English actor, best known for his television work.

== Training ==
Bolton trained at The Webber Douglas Academy of Dramatic Art, graduating with distinction in 1996.

== Stage career ==
Bolton has enjoyed a varied career on the stage and has appeared at The Gate, The Bush Theatre and The Pleasance, as well as touring with the Hull Truck Theatre.

== Television career ==
Bolton has appeared as the recurring character Dean Morris in Emmerdale since 2004 and has recently joined the BBC drama Doctors as returning character DC Dave Lynham. He has also guested on many other shows including EastEnders, as Andrew Clarke, Dalziel and Pascoe, The Bill, Dream Team and Ultraviolet.

== Personal life ==
Bolton married his wife Eve in November 2003.
