= Jack Downham =

British actor (born 2001)

- Born: 19 September 2001 (age 24); Leeds, West Yorkshire, England
- Occupation: Actor
- Years active: 2009–present

Jack Downham (born 19 September 2001) is a British actor, known for his portrayal of Noah Dingle in the ITV1 soap opera Emmerdale (2009–2026).

== Early and personal life ==
Downham was born in Leeds, West Yorkshire on 19 September 2001. His mum, Clare Downham, raised him in Leeds where he attended Leeds West Academy along with his older sister Sophie. Downham engages in a number of charity events, including charity football matches to raise money for a variety of charitable organisations.

== Career ==
Downham made his acting debut in an episode of the ITV procedural drama Heartbeat in 2009. He then portrayed a younger version of Robin Hood in the film Robin Hood. After various stints as an extra on the ITV1 soap opera Emmerdale, he was cast permanently as Noah Dingle. Downham is the third actor to have played the character of Noah. Downham's character, Noah, is three years younger than Downham's real age.

In 2010, Downham featured in the direct to video release, Emmerdale: The Dingles - For Richer for Poorer as Noah Dingle. The project served as a spin off feature of the soap opera Emmerdale. Since Downham began portraying the role, the character has had a number of major storylines since, such as stalking in 2022. Describing the storyline, Downham said "He [Noah Dingle] doesn't see it at the time, like a lot of stalkers in real life when I've been researching, they don't see that what they're doing is wrong".

== Filmography ==
Year	Title	Role	Notes
2009	Heartbeat	Peter Morley	Episode: "Looking for Isabella"
2009–2026	Emmerdale	Noah Dingle	Regular role
2010	Robin Hood	Young Robin Hood	Film
2010	Emmerdale: The Dingles - For Richer for Poorer	Noah Dingle	Direct-to-video
