= Morag Siller =

British actress

- Born: 1 November 1969; Edinburgh, Scotland
- Died: 15 April 2016 (aged 46); Withington, Manchester, England
- Education: Sylvia Young Theatre School; Royal Academy of Dramatic Art
- Occupations: Actress; writer; voice artist; presenter
- Years active: 1990–2016
- Spouse: Tim Nicholson
- Website: moragsiller.com

Morag Siller (1 November 1969 – 15 April 2016) was a Scottish actress, voice artist, and radio personality.

Siller died of breast cancer aged 46.

== Biography ==
=== Early life and education ===
Siller was born in Edinburgh, Scotland, and was adopted at the age of three with her twin brother. While in school, she initially wanted to be a pianist but realised she would probably never be able to do it as a profession. Her attention then turned to becoming a policewoman but discovered she couldn’t apply as she was an inch shy of the department's height requirement of 5'4".

During her school years, she had appeared in plays, but only as an excuse to get out of classes. She attended the Edinburgh Acting School part-time, until she moved to London at the age of 18. She attended the Sylvia Young Theatre School followed by a postgraduate degree at the Royal Academy of Dramatic Art. While still in school, she landed a small part in the David Puttnam film Memphis Belle.

=== Acting career ===
Siller performed in films, West End theatre, television, and radio. She also appeared in numerous television commercials and pop videos, including Morrissey, Holly Johnson, Thompson Twins and Comic Relief. In 2000 she fulfilled an ambition by writing and co-directing a comedy sketch show, The Brushed Forward Arrangement.

She created semi-regular roles on television, such as Flora Kilwillie in Monarch of the Glen, Marilyn Dingle in Emmerdale and Leona in Casualty, (for which she won AOL's award for Best Dramatic Performance in a Television Series in 2000). She performed in two musicals, Les Misérables and Mamma Mia!. She also played Karen alongside Maureen Lipman and Anne Reid in the ITV comedy drama, Ladies of Letters.

=== Personal life ===
In May 2005 Morag married her long term partner, classical musician Tim Nicholson. The couple lived in Cheshire, England. She had no children.

== Credits ==
=== Theatre ===
Role	Production	Director	Venue
Voltemand	Hamlet	Lyndsey Turner	Barbican Centre
Puttana	'Tis Pity She's A Whore	Michael Longhurst	Shakespeare's Globe
Mrs Plumb	Pastoral	Steve Marmion	Soho Theatre
Unknown	After Black Roses	Chris Wright	Royal Exchange
Woman / Nurse Porter	Orpheus Descending	Sarah Frankcom	Royal Exchange
Rosie	Mamma Mia!	Phyllida Lloyd	No.1 / International Tour
Pope Joan/Janine/Mrs Kidd	Top Girls		Library, Manchester
Various	The Brushed Forward Arrangement	Morag Siller	Hen & Chickens Theatre / London
Luce/Courtesan	A Comedy of Errors	Ian Brown	West Yorkshire Playhouse, Leeds
Simpson	Tons of Money		Bristol Old Vic, Bristol
Ensemble & Madame Thenadiere	Les Misérables		No 1 Tour & West End, London
Barge Woman & Narrator	The Wind in the Willows		Sheffield Crucible, Sheffield
Audrey	Blue Remembered Hills		Sheffield Crucible, Sheffield
Elvira Swainscott	Elvis Is Alive & She's Beautiful		Edinburgh Festival, Edinburgh
Jude Kelly	Mail Order Bride		West Yorkshire Playhouse, Leeds
Princess Zizi	Chatsky	Jonathan Kent	Almeida Theatre and UK Tour
Kylie	Taking Liberties	Jack Shepherd/Sara Sugarman	Hackney Empire, London
Doreen	A Talk in the Park		Kings Head, London
Anita	West Side Story		Edinburgh Theatre, Edinburgh
Jan	Grease		Brunton Theatre, Musselburgh
Glinda The Good Witch	The Wizard of Oz		Netherbow Theatre, Edinburgh
Mrs Lovett	Sweeney Todd		Churchill Theatre, London
Eve	Fear of Water		Orange Tree, London

=== TV ===
Role	Production	Production company
Dr Ferguson	Marchlands	ITV Studios
Karen	Ladies of letters	Tiger Aspect
Mrs Kilbraith	Jinx	BBC TV
Margery Bloom	Doctors	BBC TV
Tanya Bryant	Ghost Squad	Company Pictures
Prostitute	Robert Louis Stevenson	BBC Scotland
Marilyn Dingle	Emmerdale	Yorkshire TV
Mrs. Rust	Swiss Toni II	Tiger Aspect
Wendy	Grease Monkeys	BBC TV
Brenda	Doctors	BBC TV
Barbara	Night and Day	Granada TV
Leona	Casualty	BBC TV
Nurse Penny Lambirth	Fields of Gold	BBC TV
Sister Dolores	Peak Practice	Carlton TV
DIY Saleswoman	Los Dos Bros	Talkback
Flora Kilwillie	Monarch of the Glen	BBC Scotland
Leila	Masie Raine	Fair Game Films
Driving Instructor	The Man	BBC TV/Crucial Films
Karen Kennedy	The Bill	Thames
Maggie	Education Film	BBC TV
Flossy	Candy Floss	BBC Scotland
Nancy	Trial and Retribution	LWT
Susan Makepeace	Hetty Wainthrop Investigates	BBC TV
Sharon	Life and Death	LWT
Homeless Mum	O Mary This London	BBC TV
Waitress	A View to a Thrill	BBC Scotland

=== Film ===
Role	Production	Director
Jessie	Summer Solstice	Giles Foster
Whore	Stanley/The Libertine	Lawrence Dunmore
Lisa Gibbons	Dreams	Michael Hilyn
Sarah	Secret Society	Imogen Kimmel
Mary Lee	House of Mirth	Terence Davies
Baitdigger & Claudia	The Hurting	Kaprice Kea
Gloria	Exploding into Life	Simon Gascoigne
Farm Girl/Jitterbugger	Memphis Belle	Michael Caton-Jones / David Puttnam
