= Richard Moore (actor) =

English actor

- Born: 1942 (age 83–84); Burnley, Lancashire, England
- Occupation: Actor
- Years active: 1960s–2005

Richard Moore (born 1942) is an English actor known for playing Jarvis Skelton on ITV's Emmerdale from 2002 to 2005.

== Early and personal life ==
Moore was born in 1942, and lived in Burnley, Lancashire during his early life, attending Burnley Grammar School. He initially worked as a photographer for the Burnley Express, while being involved with amateur dramatics groups, one of which included Malcolm Hebden, called The Highcliffe Players. He went on to train at Bristol Old Vic Theatre School. Early TV appearances were in the first series of The Likely Lads, with James Bolam and Rodney Bewes. Moore is a keen Burnley F.C. supporter, even sneaking club paraphernalia onto the Emmerdale set.

== Acting career ==
After drama school, Moore spent more than 10 years with the Royal Shakespeare Company.

Television

- After Henry (1992) as Mr Ashley guest role.
- Emmerdale (2002–2005) as Jarvis Skelton, series regular
- McCallum (1997–1998) as Sir Paddy Penfold, series regular
- Shadow of the Noose (TV series) (1989) Sir Charles Mathews (episodes 1 & 7)
- Band of Gold (1995–1996) as Curly, series regular
- Coronation Street (1984) as George Hepworth in 2 episodes
- Z-Cars (1964) as Alan Barnes in the Episode "I Mean... Where Does It Stop?"

Film

- Blue Juice (1995) as Smuggler FM's Dan
- The Offence (1973) as Garrett

Stage

- As You Like It (1968) RSC production at the Royal Shakespeare Theatre
- A Midsummer Night's Dream (1972) RSC production at the Aldwych Theatre
- "Henry IV Part 1 & 2, Henry V" merry wives of Windsor (1975) RSC played Pistol in production at the Royal Shakespeare Theatre
