= Nathan Gladwell =

British actor

- Born: Lancashire, England
- Occupation: Actor

Nathan Gladwell is a British actor, best known for his role as builder Syd Woolfe on the ITV soap opera Emmerdale, a role which he played from 2002 until 2004.

Gladwell is also noted for his roles in other television shows including Doctors, Peak Practice and Cutting It. Since leaving Emmerdale in 2004, Gladwell is more noted within the United Kingdom for his performances in theatre, rather than onscreen, appearing on West End stage musicals such as Saturday Night Fever and Grease.
