= List of Emmerdale Farm characters introduced in 1972–1973 =

The following is a list of characters that first appeared in the British soap opera Emmerdale Farm in 1972 and 1973, by order of first appearance. The first episode of Emmerdale Farm was broadcast on 16 October 1972. Marian Wilks is the first character to be seen on screen, riding her horse past Peggy Skilbeck, who speaks the serial's first lines of dialogue asking her husband, Matt Skilbeck, who Marian is. Peggy's widowed mother, Annie Sugden, brother Joe Sugden and grandfather Sam Pearson are the next to be seen, preparing for Jacob's Sugden's funeral. Jack Sugden is seen in The Woolpack alongside landlord Amos Brearly, watching his father's funeral procession go by. Following the funeral, Marian's father, Henry Wilks, visits Annie to discuss right of way over adjoining land to Emmerdale Farm.

Janie Harker makes her first appearance on 23 October. In November, Janie's sister, Ruth Merrick (later known as Pat), arrives alongside her husband, Tom, and their children, Jackie and Sandie. George Verney first appears in January 1973. Louise Jameson then appears, as Sharon Crossthwaite, as does Jim Latimer. The following month, the Reverend Edward Ruskin and his wife, Liz, make their first appearances, followed by Alison Gibbons. In April, the serial's first birth occurs when Matt and Peggy's twins, Sam and Sally, are born. The serial's original doctor, Clare Scott, debuts in May and shopkeeper Lena Dawkins is introduced in December.

== Marian Wilks ==
Marian Wilks
- Emmerdale character
- Portrayed by: Gail Harrison (1972–1978); Debbi Blythe (1987–1988)
- Duration: 1972–1975, 1978, 1987–1988
- First appearance: Episode 1; 16 October 1972
- Last appearance: Episode 1278; 1 September 1988
- Created by: Kevin Laffan
- Introduced by: Peter Holmans (1972); David Cunliffe (1978); Keith Richardson (1987)
In-universe information
- Other names: Marian Rosetti
- Father: Henry Wilks
- Mother: Margaret Wilks
- Husband: Paolo Rosetti (until 1988)
- Sons: Nicolo Rosetti
- Stepdaughters: Francesca Rosetti

Marian Rosetti (also Wilks) was first played by Gail Harrison from 1972 to 1978, then by Debbie Blythe for two stints in 1987 and 1988. She first appeared on the show's first ever episode and was the first character to be seen on screen, riding on horseback. She was the daughter of wealthy retired factory owner Henry Wilks (Arthur Pentelow) who later ran the Woolpack with long standing landlord Amos Brearly (Ronald Magill). Marian embarked on a brief affair with Jack Sugden (Andrew Burt) in the first few months of the show.

== Peggy Skilbeck ==
Peggy Skilbeck
- Emmerdale character
- Portrayed by: Jo Kendall
- Duration: 1972–1973
- First appearance: Episode 1; 16 October 1972
- Last appearance: Episode 77; 16 July 1973
- Created by: Kevin Laffan
- Introduced by: Peter Holmans
In-universe information
- Family: Skilbeck
- Father: Jacob Sugden
- Mother: Annie Sugden
- Brothers: Jack Sugden; Joe Sugden
- Husband: Matt Skilbeck (1968–1973)
- Sons: Sam Skilbeck
- Daughters: Sally Skilbeck
- Grandfathers: Joseph Sugden; Sam Pearson
- Grandmothers: Margaret Sugden; Grace Pearson
- Uncles: Edward Sugden
- Nephews: Jackie Merrick; Robert Sugden
- Nieces: Victoria Sugden

Peggy Skilbeck (née Sugden) was one of Emmerdale's original characters, the second eldest child and only daughter of Jacob and Annie Sugden, born on 28 August 1948. She was the first character to speak in the show; her line being "Matt, who's she?" Peggy married Matt Skilbeck in 1968 and had two children, twins Sam and Sally Skilbeck, in April 1973. Peggy died on 16 July 1973 of a brain haemorrhage at the age of 24.

== Janie Harker ==
Janie Harker
- Emmerdale character
- Portrayed by: Uncredited (1972); Diane Grayson (1972–1974); Lesley Duff (1986)
- Duration: 1972–1974, 1986
- First appearance: 23 October 1972
- Last appearance: 9 September 1986
- Created by: Kevin Laffan
- Introduced by: Peter Holmans (1972); Keith Richardson (1986)
In-universe information
- Other names: Janie Blakey
- Father: David Harker
- Mother: Dolly Harker
- Brothers: Syd Harker
- Sisters: Pat Sugden
- Husband: Frank Blakey (1973–present)
- Uncles: Tom Harker
- Aunts: Elsie Harker
- Nephews: Jackie Merrick; Robert Sugden
- Nieces: Sandie Merrick
- Other relatives: Sebastian White

Janie Harker (also Blakey), played by Diane Grayson, made her first appearance in the episode airing on 23 October 1972. When the character returned in 1986, she was played by Lesley Duff. Janie is the younger sister of Pat Sugden. Janie visits Joe Sugden in hospital, following his car crash and suggests he takes her out when he recovers but he declines. Later, Janie dates Frank Blakey a few times and the pair quickly become engaged and marry in March 1973. The following year, Janie discovers she is pregnant and neglects to tell Frank. However, Frank finds this out when Joe congratulates him on his child. Frank remains silent, allowing Janie to tell him about the baby in her own time. Ruth also returned to the village, having divorced her husband Tom and left the kids with him. She attempts suicide but is rescued, and Janie, Frank and Pat leave the village soon after. When Ruth, now known as Pat dies in a car accident in 1986, Janie returns to the village for the funeral.

== Tom Merrick ==
Tom Merrick
- Emmerdale character
- Portrayed by: Dave Hill (1972); Edward Peel (1980–1982); Jack Carr (1984–1988)
- Duration: 1972, 1980–1982, 1984–1986, 1988
- First appearance: 6 November 1972
- Last appearance: 10 February 1988
- Created by: Kevin Laffan
- Introduced by: Peter Holmans (1972); Michael Glynn (1980); Keith Richardson (1988)
In-universe information
- Sisters: Mary Merrick
- Wife: Pat Sugden (until 1973)
- Sons: Tommy Merrick
- Daughters: Sandie Merrick
- Stepsons: Jackie Merrick
- Granddaughters: Louise Merrick

Tom Merrick is the first husband of Ruth Harker (later known as Pat). He appeared in 1972, 1980–1982 and 1984–1986, followed by a brief reappearance in 1988 at Jackie Merrick's wedding.

Jackie Merrick was born just under seven months after the wedding in early November that year, although Tom believed he was the father and spent years bringing up Jackie. Pat even told Tom Jackie was born two months premature so Tom believed he was the father. Very little is known about his early background before his marriage to Pat but he had a sister and his mother was a friend of Annie Sugden.

Tom returns to the village in 1972 and picks a fight with Joe Sugden after seeing Joe and Pat together in "The Woolpack". Tom is suspicious of how Jackie bears a strong resemblance to Jack, as well as sharing his name, and Jack is later revealed as Jackie's father. Tom blackmails Jack when he finds out that he had been sleeping at Inglebrook while Henry Wilks was laid up, and Jack later fires Tom. The Merricks then move to Leeds to live near Tom's sister.

Pat, Jackie and hers and Tom's daughter Sandie Merrick return in 1980, having left Tom. He reappears later that year, a much nastier and more menacing man than in 1972, although Pat is now seeing Jack. Pat tells Tom that she wants a divorce and he hits her. Tom tries framing Jack for arson in 1981 but Jack has an alibi and is never charged. Seth Armstrong later forces Tom out of the village with threats of disclosure about the fire and Pat soon divorces him. Tom returns in 1982 and finds out the truth over Jackie's parentage. He has a fight with Jack outside the Woolpack. Tom thinks it is a bit too late to change his ways completely from his drinking, due to his age, and leaves for Aberdeen in February 1982. Tom returns a few years later when is persuaded to look after the farm while Jack and Pat keep a bedside vigil for Jackie, who is in a coma following an accident. By then we see a mellower side to the character. He returns in 1986 for Pat's funeral and made his final appearance in February 1988 at Jackie's wedding to Kathy Bates. He has not been seen or heard from since.

The second actor who played him, Edward Peel went on to play Tony Cairns in the late 1990s, making him the only actor in Emmerdale's history to play two different characters in regular roles.

== Jackie Merrick ==
Jackie Merrick
- Emmerdale character
- Portrayed by: Uncredited (1972); Ian Sharrock (1980–1989)
- Duration: 1972, 1980–1989
- First appearance: 21 November 1972
- Last appearance: 16 August 1989
- Created by: Kevin Laffan
- Introduced by: Peter Holmans (1972); Anne W. Gibbons (1980)
- Book appearances: Old Flames; Wedding Bells; Family Feuds; Young Passions; Another Door Opens; A Friend In Need; Divided Loyalties; Wives and Lovers
In-universe information
- Family: Sugden
- Father: Jack Sugden
- Mother: Pat Sugden
- Stepfather: Tom Merrick
- Brothers: Robert Sugden
- Half-brothers: Tommy Merrick; Andy Sugden; John Sugden
- Half-sisters: Sandie Merrick; Victoria Sugden
- Wife: Kathy Bates (1988–1989)
- Grandfathers: Jacob Sugden; David Harker
- Grandmothers: Annie Sugden; Dolly Harker
- Uncles: Joe Sugden; Syd Harker
- Aunts: Peggy Skilbeck; Janie Blakey
- Nephews: Jack Sugden; Sebastian White; Harry Sugden
- Nieces: Sarah Sugden
- First cousins: Sam Skilbeck; Sally Skilbeck
- Other relatives: Sam Pearson

John Jacob "Jackie" Merrick was played by Ian Sharrock from 1980 to 1989. Jackie was originally seen as a silent young boy (actor unknown) in the earliest episodes of Emmerdale Farm before becoming a fully-fledged regular character in September 1980. He is the son of Pat Merrick (originally Ruth), a former girlfriend of Jack Sugden. Jack had left the village in 1964 and Pat subsequently married Tom Merrick and made him believe he was the father, even claiming that Jackie was born prematurely, which was not the case. Jackie celebrated his 18th birthday in November 1982.

In 1985, Jackie almost died after being run over by Alan Turner while fixing his motorbike. During his slow recovery after waking from a coma, he finally acknowledged Jack as his father by referring to him as his father.

Jackie married Kathy Bates in 1988 but the marriage did not last long as Jackie was killed the following year, in an accident while he and Seth Armstrong were hunting for a £10 bet. Jackie tried to take a shotgun out of his car, but it got caught and went off by mistake, killing him in the process. The character also had a brief fling with Angie Richards, who was played by Beverley Callard.

== Sandie Merrick ==
Sandie Merrick
- Emmerdale character
- Portrayed by: Jenny Mayors-Clark (1972); Jane Hutcheson (1980–1989)
- Duration: 1972, 1980–1989
- First appearance: Episode 12; 21 November 1972
- Last appearance: Episode 1350; 11 May 1989
- Introduced by: Peter Holmans (1972); Michael Glynn (1980)
In-universe information
- Father: Tom Merrick
- Mother: Pat Sugden
- Stepfather: Jack Sugden
- Brothers: Tommy Merrick
- Half-brothers: Jackie Merrick; Robert Sugden
- Daughters: Louise Merrick
- Grandfathers: David Harker
- Grandmothers: Dolly Harker
- Uncles: Syd Harker
- Aunts: Janie Blakey
- Nephews: Sebastian White

Sandie Merrick was played by Jenny Mayors-Clark in 1972, and played by Jane Hutcheson from 1980 to 1983 and then again from 1984 to 1989, Sandie first arrived in Beckindale with her mother, father and half-brother in 1972 but left not long after. She later returned for good with her mother and half-brother in 1980.

Sandie found romance with Andy Longthorn (David Clayforth/Mark Botham) in 1982. Their love blossomed but he could not compete when Sandie was swept off her feet by agricultural student David Blakemore, who arrived in Beckindale in his flash car to help Joe Sugden (Frazer Hines) at NY Estates. Sandie then moved on to unemployed Graham Jelks, a keen mechanic who was a friend of her brother Jackie and Seth Armstrong's son, Fred.

When Sandie announced she was pregnant and refused to reveal who the father was, Dolly Skilbeck (Jean Rogers) gave her the support she needed. Only later was it discovered that Dolly herself had given birth to an illegitimate son years earlier.

The father of Sandie's baby was, in fact, Andy Longthorn (David Clayforth/Mark Botham), who had left the village to go to university. After deciding to have the baby but finding her mother, Pat Sugden, unsympathetic, Sandie joined her father, Tom, in Aberdeen where he was working on the oil rigs and gave birth to her daughter, Louise, away from the wagging tongues of Beckindale. Pat disapproved again when Sandie put Louise up for adoption and tried to rebuild her life.

There was more friction when builder Phil Pearce (Peter Alexander) left his wife, Lesley, and young daughter, Diane, to move with Sandie into Mill Cottage. The Mill had been converted into a flat by the company that Phil had just formed with Joe Sugden. Phil and Sandie started an affair which Diane unveiled to a packed audience in The Woolpack. Sandie's affair caused another village scandal, and Annie Sugden made her disapproval clear.

When Sandie subsequently passed her auctioneer's exams and took over Eric Pollard's (Chris Chittell) job, he mounted a hate campaign against her. It culminated in him breaking into the mill conversion she shared with Phil and drunkenly threatening her with a poker. Matters only worsened for Sandie when NY Estates decided to close Hotten Market and pull out of Beckindale altogether and she lost her job. Phil got involved in scams and this annoyed Sandie. They began to drift apart and they split up in July 1988. She bought Phil out of the mill. Phil was later jailed for organising a robbery on Home Farm. In May 1989, Sandie left the village to live in Scotland with her father.

In December 1991, Sandie was mentioned when Frank Tate bought Mill Cottage from her.

In January 2006, Sandie was mentioned by her former step father Jack when he mentioned how she once dated Terence Turner.

== Frank Blakey ==
Frank Blakey
- Emmerdale character
- Portrayed by: Eric Allan
- Duration: 1972–1974
- First appearance: 11 December 1972
- Last appearance: 22 January 1974
- Created by: Kevin Laffan
- Introduced by: Peter Holmans
In-universe information
- Occupation: Blacksmith; Teacher
- Husband: Janie Harker (1973–present)

Frank Blakey, portrayed by Eric Allan, was a blacksmith who began dating Janie Harker (Diane Grayson) in late 1972. They quickly get engaged and married in March 1973. Frank and Janie left Beckindale in January 1974 after Frank took up a teaching role in Essex. During his time in the village. he was accused of selling a story to the press which besmirched George Verney (Patrick Holt), which the culprit turned out to be Jack Sugden (Andrew Burt). By 1986, when Janie returned to Beckindale to see her sister Pat Sugden (Helen Weir), her and Frank had split.

== George Verney ==
George Verney
- Emmerdale character
- Portrayed by: Patrick Holt
- Duration: 1973–1974
- First appearance: 22 January 1973
- Last appearance: 24 September 1974
- Introduced by: Peter Holmans (1973)
In-universe information
- Wife: Millie Verney (backstory); Laura Verney (until 1974)

George Barton Verney, Lord Miffield was the owner of the Miffield estate and lived at Miffield Hall until 1974.

He first appeared in 1973, when his marriage to second wife Laura was falling apart. He approached the local vicar Edward Ruskin for help. Meanwhile, Laura began a secret affair with Jack Sugden and went on holiday to London with him. This led to Jack selling a false story to a newspaper about George. As a result, George beat Jack with a hunting crop outside The Woolpack, making people believe this was because Jack supposedly seduced Laura, however, it was later revealed that it was due to Jack's false story defaming George. The matter dropped as Jack saw the attack as a punishment.

Laura left Beckindale, but returned when she found out George was planning on leaving fortune to his nephew, Mark Proctor. The couple divorced in 1974 and he subsequently moved to Cannes. He died off-screen in 1978.

== Sharon Crossthwaite ==
Sharon Crossthwaite
- Emmerdale character
- Portrayed by: Louise Jameson
- First appearance: 22 January 1973
- Last appearance: 30 January 1973
- Introduced by: Peter Holmans
- Book appearances: Emmerdale Farm: Prodigal's Progress; Emmerdale Farm: All That a Man Has
In-universe information
- Occupation: Hairdresser
- Father: Ronnie Crossthwaite
- Mother: Beryl Crossthwaite
- Other relatives: Annie Sugden; Jack Sugden; Peggy Skilbeck; Joe Sugden

Sharon Crossthwaite is a cousin of Annie Sugden. She appeared in 1973. The daughter of Beryl Crossthwaite, Annie's second cousin, Sharon is raped and murdered by Jim Latimer. Sharon disappears after attending a sheep dog show. She is followed by Latimer who tries to attack her but is stopped by a homeless man, Ian "Trash" McIntyre, a friend of Jack Sugden. Jack let Trash stay with him but the police treat Trash as a suspect in Sharon's disappearance as he had some of her belongings. Trash later fell from a window at Mill Cottage and died from resulting injuries and Sharon's body is discovered shortly afterwards. Latimer is later arrested and charged with Sharon's murder and sentenced to life imprisonment. Sharon was the programme's first murder victim. Sharon's story is chronicled in the books Emmerdale Farm: Prodigal's Progress and Emmerdale Farm: All That a Man Has.

== Jim Latimer ==
Jim Latimer
- Emmerdale character
- Portrayed by: Myles Reitherman (1973); Dennis Blanch (1991)
- Duration: 1973, 1991
- First appearance: 22 January 1973
- Last appearance: 10 December 1991
- Introduced by: Peter Holmans (1973); Keith Richardson (1991)
In-universe information
- Other names: Suedeman
- Mother: Hilda Latimer

Jim Latimer (credited as Suedeman in 1991) is the killer of teenager Sharon Crosswaite (Louise Jameson). He rapes Sharon before killing her. He is arrested and later sentenced to life imprisonment. When he is released from prison, he kidnaps Sarah Connolly, who is in a relationship with Jack Sugden who was a prosecution witness at his trial in 1973. Sarah is saved by Jack and Latimer is arrested by the police.

== Edward Ruskin ==
Edward Ruskin
- Emmerdale character
- Portrayed by: George Little
- Duration: 1973–1975, 1983
- First appearance: 5 February 1973
- Last appearance: 24 May 1983
- Introduced by: Peter Holmans (1973); Michael Glynn (1983)
In-universe information
- Occupation: Vicar
- Wife: Liz Ruskin

Edward Ruskin was first seen in the show during Sharon Crossthwaite's disappearance and revelation that she had been murdered. Jim Latimer confessed to Rev Ruskin that he had killed Sharon. Ruskin and his wife Liz lived at the vicarage in Beckindale. Ruskin and village churchwarden Wally Lumm had a disagreement in 1974 over divorced women joining the Women's Union.

In May 1975, Ruskin and his wife left the village after he was transferred to another parish. There was a nice send off for him at the village hall. Mr Matthews later became Rev Ruskin's replacement. Rev Ruskin was not seen in the village for the next 8 years.

In May 1983, Rev Ruskin returned to Beckindale as a stand in vicar for Rev Hinton when he was away. That was his final visit to the village. He was never seen again in the village.

== Liz Ruskin ==
Liz Ruskin
- Emmerdale character
- Portrayed by: Daphne Green
- Duration: 1973–1975
- First appearance: 12 February 1973
- Last appearance: 20 May 1975
- Introduced by: Peter Holmans
In-universe information
- Occupation: Vicar's wife
- Husband: Edward Ruskin

Liz Ruskin was the wife of the vicar of Beckindale's church, Edward Ruskin. They lived together at the vicarage for two years until her husband was transferred elsewhere, whom she followed later the same month.

In 1983, when Edward briefly returned to the village to fill in for Donald Hinton, she did not join him.

== Alison Gibbons ==
Alison Gibbons
- Emmerdale character
- Portrayed by: Carolyn Moody
- Duration: 1973–1974
- First appearance: 26 February 1973
- Last appearance: 17 September 1974
- Introduced by: Peter Holmans
In-universe information
- Occupation: Barmaid
- Husband: Peter Gibbons

Alison Gibbons was a childhood friend of Beckindale's vicar Edward Ruskin who came to the village for a job at The Woolpack at Ruskin's recommendation.

Before moving to Beckindale, she had worked at a hotel in Liverpool, where she was born. She had been married to Peter, whom she had a child with who died the day after birth. Whilst she was married to Peter, he was ill and she began to shoplift to help her sick husband, but was imprisoned for her crimes. Peter died whilst she was in prison.

In 1973, Alison was released and went for a trail shift at The Woolpack, under the supervision of Amos Brearly (Ronald Magill), due to her criminal past. Eventually, he softens towards Alison, who later tells him that she believes that the pub is too old-fashioned by serving food. As time goes by, she later begins a relationship with Jack Sugden (Andrew Burt), but after building a friendship with Henry Wilks (Arthur Pentelow), they become a couple. This leads to him proposing to her in the April, but she rejects him due to feeling unsure about marrying a second time. Subsequently, Amos goes on a wife hunt to help him run The Woolpack and thus proposes to Alison, which she also rejects, causing her to take a break from the village in April.

Alison returns in July 1973 to take over running the shop. In her second stint, Alison builds a friendship with Matt Skilbeck (Frederick Pyne), who had recently lost his first wife Peggy Skilbeck (Jo Kendall), who died suddenly. In 1974, a traveller named Dryden Hogpen tried to win her affections. Before leaving the village, she also become friends with Norah Norris, who takes over the shop from her when she left permanently. Matt took her to the bus stop and waved her off.

== Sam Skilbeck ==
Sam Skilbeck
- Emmerdale Farm character
- Portrayed by: Jamie Bell
- Duration: 1973–1976
- First appearance: 10 April 1973
- Last appearance: 13 January 1976
- Introduced by: Peter Holmans
In-universe information
- Father: Matt Skilbeck
- Mother: Peggy Skilbeck
- Sisters: Sally Skilbeck
- Half-brothers: Samuel Skilbeck
- Grandmothers: Annie Sugden
- Uncles: Jack Sugden; Joe Sugden
- First cousins: Jackie Merrick; Robert Sugden; Victoria Sugden
- Other relatives: Sam Pearson; Sebastian White

Sam Skilbeck, played by Jamie Bell, made his debut screen appearance on 10 April 1973.

Sam is the son of Matt and Peggy Skilbeck. He appeared for three years from 1973 to 1976. Along with his twin sister Sally Skilbeck, he was one of the first births in Emmerdale Farm. Born in 1973 along with Sally, Sam is named after his great-grandfather Sam Pearson. Peggy dies three months after his birth of a brain haemorrhage. Matt and Peggy's mother Annie Sugden help bring up the twins but she's unable to cope with Sam and Sally and so sends them to live with his aunt, Beattie Dowton. On 13 January 1976, Beattie, Sam and Sally are killed when a train strikes her car on a level crossing. Following their deaths, Matt mentions them until his departure in 1989. Annie is informed by telephone and Matt is informed by police. In 1982, Matt has another son by his second wife Dolly Skilbeck and he is named Samuel Skilbeck after Sam. Sam is delighted.

== Sally Skilbeck ==
Sally Skilbeck
- Emmerdale character
- Portrayed by: Justine Bell
- Duration: 1973–1976
- First appearance: 10 April 1973
- Last appearance: 13 January 1976
- Introduced by: Peter Holmans
In-universe information
- Father: Matt Skilbeck
- Mother: Peggy Skilbeck
- Brothers: Sam Skilbeck
- Half-brothers: Samuel Skilbeck
- Grandmothers: Annie Sugden
- Uncles: Jack Sugden; Joe Sugden
- First cousins: Jackie Merrick; Robert Sugden; Victoria Sugden
- Other relatives: Sam Pearson; Sebastian White

Sally Skilbeck, played by Justine Bell, is the daughter of Matt and Peggy Skilbeck. She appeared from 1973 to 1976. Along with her twin brother Sam Skilbeck, she is the first birth of Emmerdale Farm.

Sally is born in 1973 along with Sam. Peggy dies three months after her birth of a brain haemorrhage. Matt and Peggy's mother Annie Sugden help bring up the twins but she's unable to cope with Sam and Sally and so sends them to live with his aunt, Beattie Dowton. On 13 January 1976, Beattie, Sam and Sally are killed when a train strikes her car on a level crossing. Annie is informed by telephone and Matt is informed by police. Following their deaths, Matt mentions them until his departure in 1989.

== Clare Scott ==
Clare Scott
- Emmerdale character
- Portrayed by: Joanna Tope
- First appearance: 22 May 1973
- Last appearance: 22 October 1973
- Introduced by: Peter Holmans
In-universe information
- Father: Gerald Scott
- Mother: Mavis Scott

Dr Clare Scott, played by Joanna Tope, made her first appearance on 12 May 1973 and departed on 22 October 1973. Clare Scott takes over as the local doctor of Beckindale from Dr Maurice Grant following his retirement. Clare develops a friendship with Jack Sugden. Clare's boyfriend Simon arrives in Beckindale, and proposes to her but she rejects him. Clare is last seen attending church but continues to be referred to as still living in the village.

== Christine Sharp ==
Christine Sharp
- Emmerdale character
- Portrayed by: Angela Cheyne
- Duration: 1973–1974, 1976
- First appearance: 12 November 1973
- Last appearance: 13 April 1976
- Introduced by: Peter Holmans (1973); David Cunliffe (1976)
In-universe information
- Father: Robert Sharp
- Mother: Eve Sharp
- Husband: Joe Sugden (1974–1976)

Christine Sharp (previously Sugden) is the first wife of Joe Sugden. She appeared from 1973 to 1974 and in 1976.

Only months after marrying Joe, Christine left because she did not want to be a farmer's wife. She returned two years later, hoping for a new start with Joe but when he asked for a divorce, she left Beckindale for good. In 1995, she sent flowers to Joe's funeral.

== Lena Dawkins ==
Lena Dawkins
- Emmerdale character
- Portrayed by: Lorraine Peters
- Duration: 1973–1976
- First appearance: 31 December 1973
- Last appearance: 24 February 1976
- Introduced by: Peter Holmans
In-universe information
- Occupation: Shop owner

Mrs Dawkins was first seen in late 1973 in the shop chatting to Alison Gibbons. She was a no nonsense lady. In early 1975 Norah Norris had to rush off and left Mrs Dawkins in charge of the shop. Norah later left and Mrs Dawkins took over the running of Beckindale's shop and post office. She disrupted Wilf Padgett from his work adding the post office as he claimed she talked too much. Lena took no nonsense from anybody, even her boss Henry Wilks. She was last seen in February 1976 and left the shop in between then and 1988 when a Mrs Robson ran the place.

== Other characters ==
Character	Date(s)	Actor	Circumstances
Alec Saunders	16 October 1972	Alan Tucker	Alec is a friend of Marian Wilks. When they are in the Woolpack having a drink, Jack Sugden joins them. When Jack quizzes Alec about his pedigree, he and Marian leave.
Peters	17-31 October 1972 (3 episodes)	Reginald Barrett	Henry Wilks' solicitor who offers legal advice on his attempt to gain a right of way over Emmerdale Farm.
Barney	23 October 1972 – 16 May 1978	George Malpas	Barney is Beckindale's postman and a regular drinker at The Woolpack.
Lynn Wallace	7 November 1972	Jenny Lee-Wright	Lynn meets Jack Sugden at the Feathers Country Hotel in Connelton to reach a settlement for their year-long common-law marriage in London.
PC Dave Ball	13 November 1972 – 30 January 1973 (7 episodes)	Christopher Wray	Dave is a local policeman. He questions Joe Sugden and Henry Wilks when they crash their cars in front of Inglebrook House. He later questions Jim Latimer when Sharon Crossthwaite disappears.
Norman Harrison	30 November-8 December 1972 (3 episodes)	Christopher Mitchell	A childhood friend of Marian Wilks and the former best friend of Peter Heskeith, who Marian used to be romantically involved with. He and Marian share a drink in The Woolpack attracting the attention of customers, including Jack Sugden, as he laughed about and insulted the village folk to Marian. Jack tries to pick a fight with him but Norman pushes Jack to the floor and leaves the pub. Marian's father, Henry Wilks, encourages Norman to make a move on Marian but when Norman and Marian kiss, she insists she wanted to take things slow. Norman later proposes to Marian but she rejects him.
Harry Jameson	16 December 1972 – 16 January 1973 (7 episodes)	John Glyn-Jones	Harry is approached by Henry Wilks who wants to buy his farm from him. When Harry learns that Jack Sugden is also interested in buying the farm, he plays Henry and Jack off against each other in order to secure as high a price as possible.
Bart Ansett	18 December 1972 – 9 January 1973 (4 episodes)	Trevor Ray	Bart is a friend of Jack Sugden from London. He reveals to Jack's family during a visit that Jack is a bestselling author who has recently written a novel The Field of Tares.
Robin Matthews	22-23 January 1973 (2 episodes)	Mike Grady	Robin and Gary are friends of Jim Latimer, who attend the Beckindale Sheepdog trials. When Jim disappears, they search for him.
Gary Bidwell	22-23 January 1973 (2 episodes)	Paul Rosebury	Robin and Gary are friends of Jim Latimer, who attend the Beckindale Sheepdog trials. When Jim disappears, they search for him.
Beryl Crossthwaite	29 January–9 April 1973 (8 episodes)	Joan Scott	Beryl is the mother of Sharon Crossthwaite and a cousin of Annie Sugden. When Sharon is raped and murdered by Jim Latimer, Beryl and her husband, Ronnie sell their cottage in Beckindale and move to Hull.
Yates	5 March–28 August 1973 (5 episodes)	Tom Gowling	George Verney's butler.
Penny Golightly	19 March–19 June 1973	Louisa Martin	Penny is the daughter of Ian "Trash" MacIntyre. She arrives in the village in search of her father, only to be told by Annie Sugden that Trash had died the previous month after a window fall and is left devastated. Joe Sugden is attracted to Penny and they agree to go fishing but Penny forgets, standing him up. Penny then befriends Jim Latimer, who wants more and attempts to strangle her. Jack Sugden and Reverend Edward Ruskin witness the attack and are able to save Penny. Following this, Penny settles into the area and strieks a close friendship with Jack and dates Joe for a while but quickly becomes tired of his immaturity. Penny leaves Beckindale after leaving a message for Jack saying she would be returning to Birmingham and would be back, however, she never returns.
Ronnie Crossthwaite	9 July 1973	Royston Tickner	Ronnie is the husband of Beryl Crossthwaite and father of Sharon. He arrives in the village to arrange the sale of their house, following Sharon's death and their move to Hull. Annie Sugden offers to help organise an estate agent.
Mark Proctor	13 August–9 October 1973 (10 episodes)	Geoffrey Burridge	Mark is George Verney's nephew who arrives to stay with at Miffield Hall, against his father, Ronald's wishes. Mark leaves to attend Agricultural College in October.
Ronald Proctor	20–21 August 1973 (2 episodes)	Edward Judd	Ronald is Mark Proctor's father. He arrives in Beckindale to try to get his son to return home to London but Mark refuses to budge, so Ronald leaves alone.
Hilda Latimer	1–2 October 1973 (2 episodes)	Norma Shebbeare	Hilda is the mother of Jim Latimer, who arrives in Beckindale to attend his trial for raping and murdering 17-year-old Sharon. Hilda is pelted with mud by Johnny Rogers and his friend, much to her distress. Matt Skilbeck takes her back to Emmerdale Farm where Annie Sugden comforts her. She believes that Jim is innocent and is later arrested off-screen when she attacks Johnny's mother.
Johnny Rogers	2 October 1973, 29 October 1974 (2 episodes)	Jeremy Lee	Johnny is a local boy who pelts Hilda Latimer with mud while she is at the village bus stop. He is then forced to apologise to her. The following year, Johnny is caught stealing Ginger Beer from outside the local shop by shopkeeper Norah Norris and Henry Wilks.
Beattie Dowton	15 October 1973–22 December 1975	Barbara Ogilvie	Matt Skilbeck's aunt and uncle. They visit Matt in order to meet his six-month old twins Sam Skilbeck. When Matt finds it difficult to cope with the twins he sends them to live with Beattie and Ben, Who bring them to visit occasionally. In January 1976, Beattie and the twins are killed when a train collides with their car on a level crossing. Ben returns in 1984 for the funeral of Matt's grandfather-in-law, Sam Pearson.
Ben Dowton	15 October 1973–31 December 1975, 27–29 November 1984	Larry Noble	Matt Skilbeck's aunt and uncle. They visit Matt in order to meet his six-month old twins Sam Skilbeck. When Matt finds it difficult to cope with the twins he sends them to live with Beattie and Ben, Who bring them to visit occasionally. In January 1976, Beattie and the twins are killed when a train collides with their car on a level crossing. Ben returns in 1984 for the funeral of Matt's grandfather-in-law, Sam Pearson.
Josh Durrock	15–16 October 1973 (2 episodes)	Hal Galili	Josh works for Lodz Films, an American film studio who are interested in the film rights to Jack Sugden's best-selling novel Field of Tares. Jack avoids Josh but Josh eventually catches up with him, after Jack's mother Annie Sugden tells Josh that Jack is at the Harvest Festival. Jack, infuriated with Annie's interference, tells Josh he's terminating the contract and no longer wants to make the movie.
Dan Middleton	5 November 1973 – 6 August 1974 (3 episodes)	John Malcolm	Dan is a local farmer and a friend of the Sugden family. He and his daughter, Briddy visit the Sugdens. Dan and Frank Blakey argue over Dan's suggestion to implement a production line at the Forge during dinner, much to Frank's wife Janie's annoyance. The Middletons reappear when Beattie Dowton celebrates her birthday at their farm.
Fred Anstey	26 November 1973 – 22 October 1974 (4 episodes)	James Ottaway	Fred is a friend of Sam Pearson. He attends the Beckindale vs Robblesfield Cricket match.
Wally Lumm	26 November 1973 – 25 June 1974	Herbert Ranmskill	Wally Lumm is a village elder and a churchwarden. He is unpopular in Beckindale due to his controversial views on religion and is angered when Reverend Edward Ruskin attends a Catholic church in Hotten. In late 1974, Wally falls ill with pneumonia and dies in January 1975.
