= Sarah Sugden =

Fictional character from Emmerdale

- Emmerdale character
- Alyson Spiro as Sarah Sugden (1999)
- Portrayed by: Madeleine Howard (1988–1994); Alyson Spiro (1994–2000)
- Duration: 1988–2000
- First appearance: 7 April 1988
- Last appearance: 16 November 2000
- Introduced by: Stuart Doughty
- Madeleine Howard as Sarah Sugden (1993)
In-universe information
- Occupation: Librarian; Barmaid; Waitress
- Mother: Victoria Connolly
- Sisters: Maggie
- Husband: Jack Sugden (1994–2000)
- Daughters: Victoria Sugden
- Adoptive sons: Andy Sugden; Robert Sugden
- Grandsons: Jack Sugden (adoptive); Sebastian White (adoptive); Harry Sugden
- Granddaughters: Sarah Sugden (adoptive)

Sarah Connolly (also Sugden) is a fictional character from the British television soap opera Emmerdale. She was first played by Madeleine Howard from 1988 until 1994 then by Alyson Spiro from 1994 until 2000.

== Creation and casting ==
In 1988, Emmerdale acquired new series producer Stuart Doughty, who made a series of changes to make the show to feel more up to date. This included introducing new characters Sarah Connolly and the three-strong Hughes family in September to "shake up the mix and to act as identification figures" for newer viewers. The new characters were "outsiders" who challenged the Sugden family's way of life. Madeleine Howard was cast as Sarah. She was in her first term at college, where she was learning to teach the Alexander Technique, when she first auditioned for the show. The role as Jack Sugden's (Clive Hornby) love interest was originally scheduled to last for seven episodes. Howard recalled: "After my first stint I sat on the train home and thought to myself that was it." Howard was later asked to reprise her role twice before she was promoted to the main cast.

== Development ==
Howard played Sarah until 1994. She decided not to renew her contract, along with Frazer Hines (Joe Sugden) and Fionnuala Ellwood (Lynn Whiteley). Hines commented: "We've all been there for a while and just decided it was time to move on." Howard's departure came as a surprise to producers, as her character had just married Jack three months prior. Howard refused to comment on her departure and Sarah was temporarily written out in August. Instead of writing the character out permanently, producers recast the role to actress Alyson Spiro. Spiro admitted that taking over another actor's role was "slightly odd", but she had also never watched Emmerdale before, so it felt like a clean slate to her and made the part easier to approach. Spiro said Hornby helped her out a lot, but the public did not take to her and she received several comments saying "you aren't like the other one, are you?" Viewers eventually warmed to Spiro's take on the character during a storyline in which her stepson Robert Sugden (Christopher Smith) goes missing.

As Spiro took over the role, Sarah goes through a personality change partly triggered by the birth of her first child. The actress said that it was a strong storyline to come into and wanted to make sure it continued. Spiro explained that Sarah has had enough and realises that she is sick of Jack and farm life. She told Inside Soap's Victoria Ross: "I think that the scriptwriters have remembered the Sarah of old. As an older woman who's just had a baby, she's realised that life is slipping away from her and so her perspective has now completely changed." Sarah walks out on Jack, but Spiro said it is a move designed to trigger a response. She reckoned Jack actually needed "a good boot up the behind!" Spiro was not a fan of her character's style and thought she wore too many checked shirts, so she planned to change her wardrobe. Spiro also spoke about Sarah's friendship with Jan Glover (Roberta Kerr). She called Jan "a strong ally" for Sarah and thought their friendship would be very important.

In 2000, the Sugdens' marriage comes to an end when Sarah has an affair with lodger Richie Carter (Glenn Lamont). Spiro enjoyed how the plot transformed her character from a "downtrodden" housewife to a desired woman. She explained, "When I found out what the scriptwriters had in store I thought it was great. It certainly makes a difference from serving cups of tea in the Diner. Instead I get to have fun rolling around in the hay." Spiro insisted that there was more to Sarah and Richie's relationship than just sex. She told Inside Soap's Claire Brand that Sarah got on well with Richie and had seemingly found someone she could talk to, who was also interested in her as a person. She believed Jack had taken Sarah for granted for a number of years. The truth about Sarah's affair is revealed during episodes set around the local May Fair. Having grown frustrated with Sarah's stalling, Richie packs her bags and tells Jack the truth when they return home. Spiro said her character is left "totally bewildered" at how the secret comes out and everything "spins out of control for her".

Sarah is forced to leave her children behind at the farm, as she and Richie flee. Spiro pointed out that Sarah hoped to have them with her when she left, and that one of the reasons she put off leaving Jack was because of the children. When Andy and Robert tell her that they no longer want anything to do with her, Sarah is "devastated" and Spiro told Brand that she ends up convincing herself that Jack is not letting them see her, as she cannot believe the truth. Spiro went on to explain that walking away from her marriage is difficult for Sarah, but it had not been going well for some time. She attributed some of that to the bitterness Sarah felt about Jack's own affair with Rachel Hughes (Glenda McKay) and hoped that Jack would forgive her, like she forgave him, if they were to reconcile. Spiro added, "I don't see why they couldn't get back together at some point, but they would have to realise that it would be a completely different marriage. When Richie came along Sarah was at a point where she was fed up and bored with everything. All the children were at school and she had no real purpose to her life. It was never part of her master plan just to be a farmer's wife."

After six years in the role, Spiro asked producer Kieran Roberts to write her out of Emmerdale. She explained that since the show had started going out five nights a week, the workload had increased and as she lived in London, she found it "an impossibility". She also believed the Sarah/Richie/Jack plot had come to a point where something big was going to happen, so she thought she had chosen the right time to leave. She commented, "With a soap, you either stay forever, or take the plunge and try other things, which is what I wanted to do."

== Storylines ==
Sarah arrives as a librarian at the local library of Beckindale and befriends Archie Brooks (Tony Pitts), Kathy Merrick (Malandra Burrows) and Rachel Hughes (Glenda McKay). She also becomes friendly with local farmer Jack Sugden when he returns a book to the library but when she asks him out, he rejects her advances because he is still grieving for his late wife, Pat (Helen Weir), who died a year and a half earlier and had to look after his and Pat's two-year-old son Robert Sugden (Richard Smith). But in April 1989, they begin a relationship and Sarah treats Robert like her own. However, Jack and Pat's 24-year-old son, Jackie Merrick (Ian Sharrock), dislikes Sarah and tries to get his brother away from her any time he can, not wanting their mother's memory to be forgotten. Eventually, Sarah's best friend and Jackie's wife Kathy get the two to be friends.

In September 1988, Jack leaves for Italy to see old flame Marian Wilks (Debbi Blythe) leaving Sarah unaware of where they stand. Jack returns in August after Jackie is killed in a gun accident and stays for his funeral before leaving again but makes a permanent return in November which a nosey Amos Brearly (Ronald Magill) makes sure Sarah is aware of. Jack declares his relationship with Marian is over and it is Sarah he wants. In 1990, Sarah agrees to move in with Jack in the farm but keeps the connecting door nailed shut to stop his mother Annie Sugden's (Sheila Mercier) habit of wandering in, declaring she was used to living alone. Sarah refuses to help out on the farm at first but later agrees when the Sugdens find themselves shorthanded. The mobile library closes in June 1990 so Jack gets Sarah a job as barmaid in the woolpack working for Amos and Henry Wilks (Arthur Pentelow), who are impressed with her work ethic.

Following murderer Jim Latimer's (Dennis Blanch) released from jail for the murder of Jack's cousin Sharon Crossthwaite (Louise Jameson) in 1973, he swears revenge on Jack who was a witness at his trial. He kidnaps Sarah, holding her hostage in an abandoned warehouse but Jack and his brother, Joe, rescue Sarah, who is unharmed, and Latimer is subsequently arrested. In January 1994, Jack proposes to Sarah. By then, they discover Sarah is pregnant and in March 1994, Sarah gives birth to their daughter Victoria Sugden (Jessica Heywood). In May 1994, Jack and Sarah marry but weeks after the wedding, Victoria stops breathing and a hole in her heart is found. Victoria nearly dies but a part of Sarah's heart is taken to save Victoria's life. The Sugdens' marriage is tested when Sarah befriends American professor Andrew MacKinnon (Michael J. Jackson), much to Jack's jealousy, and further strain comes when Robert runs away from home but is safely found by Derek Simpson (Garry Cooper) who is wrongly accused of kidnapping him.

Robert brings his friend Andy Hopwood (Kelvin Fletcher) to the farm and explains that Andy lives in a children's home after his mother and grandmother (Beatrice Kelly) died, and his father Billy Hopwood (David Crellin) is in jail. Jack and Sarah adopt Andy and he eventually becomes a Sugden. The following year, the family are evicted from the farm by landlord Frank Tate (Norman Bowler) in order get a quarry built but they move into a new farm. Soon after, Jack begins an affair with Sarah's friend Rachel Tate (Glenda McKay). When Sarah finds out, she throws Jack out but they later reconcile. Billy escapes from prison and tries to rob the post office, accidentally killing Vic Windsor (Alun Lewis). Andy confesses to Jack about where Billy is hiding and he is arrested, while Vic's hysterical widow Viv Windsor (Deena Payne) shouts abuse at Andy for hiding his father, making Sarah and Viv's relationship even more tenuous than it was previously.

Jack and Sarah's marriage faces more tests when Sarah leaves for several weeks to clear her head and on her return she and Jack argue about the changes he has made in her absence, including stopping Andy and Robert from going to school so they can work on the farm. Sarah demands that they go back to school and takes a job at Kathy's diner so they can afford to employ people on the farm. When Rachel is murdered by her boyfriend Graham Clark (Kevin Pallister) and she realises that Jack still had feelings for her, Sarah feels unsure about how to feel regarding Rachel's death, as despite her affair with Jack, the two women had been extremely close in the years before. Financial problems ensue and at Christmas Sarah buys Robert and Andy the video games they wanted in spite of money problems, causing more tension between her and Jack. Despite vowing to make their marriage work, Jack sells Sarah's car to Ashley Thomas (John Middleton) and confides in Kathy about his marriage problems. Sarah is infuriated as she had supported Kathy when she was nearly killed by Graham, having exposed him as Rachel's killer. As the Millennium dawns, Sarah begins an affair with lodger Richie Carter, and she and Jack split up when the truth is revealed in May. Jack denies Sarah access to the children and a custody battle follows. Andy resents Sarah for what she did to Jack and chooses to stay with Jack but Robert remains loyal to Sarah and turns to her about changing his GCSEs when Jack does not show any interest. Despite this, Jack is awarded custody of Robert due to Sarah not being his biological mother. Sarah wins custody of Victoria (now Hannah Midgley) and asks Richie to babysit, but he leaves her alone, which angers Jack, who publicly threatens to kill both Sarah and Richie, which is witnessed by shocked Woolpack customers.

Sarah decides to end the affair with Richie and reconcile with Jack in order to make things work for the children's sake, even realising she still loves Jack. Leaving Victoria with Angie Reynolds (Freya Copeland), she visits Jack at the farm. Richie persuades her to talk, so Sarah suggests they do so in the barn. Thinking Jack is in the barn, they hide behind a haybale but it is Andy, who is setting fire to the barn for insurance in order to solve the Sugdens' ongoing financial woes. Richie manages to escape the flames but Sarah is too scared to move and tells Richie to leave without her. Jack hears the noise and attempts to rescue Sarah who is screaming for him but he is overwhelmed by the flames and smoke and the barn explodes, instantly killing Sarah. Jack is immediately the prime suspect for murder and subsequently remanded in custody. After Jack's barrister suggests he pleads guilty, Andy confesses to Richie who agrees to change his statement and Jack is freed. Sarah's death remains a source of animosity between Robert and Andy for a number of years. Nearly five years after Sarah's death, Andy's daughter Sarah is named in her honour. Following a house fire started by a teenage Victoria (Isabel Hodgins), Andy confesses to killing Sarah and is sentenced to three years' imprisonment but is released within a few months.
