= Kathy Glover =

Fictional character from Emmerdale

- Emmerdale character
- Portrayed by: Malandra Burrows
- Duration: 1985–2001, 2005
- First appearance: Episode 1004; 26 November 1985
- Last appearance: Episode 4193; 1 November 2005
- Introduced by: Richard Handford (1985); Kathleen Beedles (2005)
In-universe information
- Occupation: Student; Farm hand; Stablehand; Barmaid; Owner of Kathy's Diner
- Father: Malcolm Bates
- Mother: Caroline Bates
- Stepmother: Sonia Bates
- Brothers: Nick Bates
- Half-brothers: William Bates
- Husband: Jackie Merrick (1988–1989); Chris Tate (1991–1995); Dave Glover (1996); Mr Brookman (2002–present)
- Grandmothers: Alice Wood
- Nieces: Alice Bates

Kathy Brookman (also Bates, Merrick, Tate and Glover) is a fictional character from the British television soap opera Emmerdale, played by Malandra Burrows. She made her first appearance during the episode broadcast on 26 November 1985. In 2001, new series producer Steve Frost decided to write the character out. Burrows briefly reprised the role in 2005, as Kathy returns for the funeral of Seth Armstrong (Stan Richards).

Kathy was one of the show's central characters throughout her time. At the time of her departure, was the longest-running female character in the programme, and fourth overall, behind Jack Sugden (Clive Hornby), Seth and Alan Turner (Richard Thorp). Her storylines included three failed marriages, suffering a miscarriage, an affair with Josh Lewis (Peter Warnock), opening the village tea rooms, an ill-fated engagement to Biff Fowler (Stuart Wade), kidnap and suffering a breakdown.

== Development ==
Burrows joined the cast in 1985. The actress admitted that she was not initially aware of "how agricultural" the show would be. She said "My first memory is the smell of cows when I walked in there. Clive Hornby and Frazer Hines, as Jack and Joe, loved winding me up. That first time, they said to me 'watch for the twitching tails.' I wondered what they meant. Then I felt something wet and warm and I realised I was covered."

In July 2005 it was announced that Burrows agreed to reprise her role for the funeral of Seth Armstrong (Stan Richards). [...]"Burrows was one of the most popular characters on Emmerdale," an insider told the Sunday Mirror, "Her return is a huge coup."[...] .

== Storylines ==
Kathy arrives in Emmerdale with her mother, Caroline (Diana Davies), and brother, Nick (Cy Chadwick), in 1985, following her parents' separation. Kathy studies for her A-levels but leaves school when Alan Turner (Richard Thorp) gives her a job at NY Estates as a farm worker. She is put in charge of the poultry unit at Home Farm, where thousands of battery hens are reared. Eventually, it becomes too much for her and she quits – which does not surprise Joe Sugden (Frazer Hines), who had advised against her appointment all along. Kathy worked part-time at Emmerdale Farm and, in 1988, set up a farm shop with Dolly Skilbeck (Jean Rogers) and helps make goat's cheese. Kathy, also a horsewoman, additionally looks after Joe and Alan's horses.

Kathy begins a relationship with Jackie Merrick (Ian Sharrock) but they break up temporarily, in 1987, when Kathy begins dating Tony Marchant (Mark Payton), a rich relative of NY boss Christopher Meadows (Conrad Phillips), causing Jackie to smash up Tony's van out of jealousy. Jackie pleads for Kathy to return to him which she does and they reconcile and become engaged. The wedding is nearly ruined when a burst water tank in the Bates' cottage destroys Kathy's dress, the night before. The day is saved when Dolly, Caroline and Jackie's grandmother, Annie Sugden (Sheila Mercier) alter Annie's own wedding dress, which her late mother Grace had worn on her wedding to Annie's father, Sam (Toke Townley). Kathy and Jackie marry and go on honeymoon to Tunisia. When the couple return, they move into the attic at Emmerdale Farm and later move into Demdyke Row. They struggle financially due to Jackie's meagre wage, which is supplemented by Kathy's earnings. When their hours clash, Kathy gives up her job as a part-time barmaid at The Woolpack. Kathy falls pregnant but miscarries, due to Chiamydia psittaci, contracted from the sheep. Jackie is later killed in a shooting accident, leaving Kathy devastated. Kathy then takes over Jackie's job as a labourer at the farm, as well as running their own 20 acres (81,000 m^{2}) of rented land at Home Farm.

For several months Kathy loses interest in everything and only comes out of her shell when she reluctantly joins the cast of Amos Brearly's (Ronald Magill) village production of Dracula, in January 1990. By this time Chris Tate (Peter Amory) was keen on her, but she initially rejects his advances and finds herself at loggerheads with Chris's father: Frank (Norman Bowler), who soon evicts her for missing rent in the third quarter of the previous year. However, Frank eventually approves of Kathy's relationship with Chris; she later becomes friends with Frank's only-daughter and Chris's sister Zoe (Leah Bracknell). One of Chris's drivers, George Starkey (James Noble), brings news that a cafe owner in Southampton – who was also a medium – had a message from her dead husband, in a bid to win her over. Kathy goes to Southampton, despite much advice not to take such things seriously, but the inconclusive experience sees Kathy decide to get on with her life.

Kathy's feelings for Chris grow and they begin a relationship. In April 1990 they sleep together. Their relationship grows stronger when Chris buys Kathy a new car. They marry in 1991 and Frank offers the couple Mill Cottage, as a wedding present, though they insist on paying him for it. Kathy begins applying for a HGV licence, much to Chris's shock. Kathy begins looking after Chris's stepmother Kim's (Claire King) horses and is shocked to discover that Kim is having an affair with Neil Kincaid (Brian Deacon), which puts her in an impossible position and she resigns to help Lynn Whiteley run the wine bar at The Woolpack. In 1993 she has a brief dalliance with American wine rep Josh Lewis and plans to leave Beckindale with Josh but a plane crash occurs in the village. Chris is one of the casualties and is left paralysed. Frank then buys a purpose-built bungalow, to accommodate Chris's needs. Their marriage collapses in 1994 when Chris begins an affair with his would-be second wife Rachel Hughes (Glenda McKay) and impregnates her. However, Kathy is on hand to assist Rachel when she goes into labor and they rebuild their friendship – becoming best-friends in the process.

Following the divorce settlement, Kathy invests the money to buy the old tearooms in the village and begins a relationship with Dave Glover (Ian Kelsey) – who ironically works for the Tates. Dave has a fling with Kim but it fizzles out and they return to Kathy and Frank respectively. Kathy and Dave marry, on 28 November 1996, but Dave dies nearly a month later, on Boxing Day, when he tries to save Kim's son, James, who he believes is his. Kathy is left widowed once again. Kathy later becomes involved with Dave's former brother-in-law, Biff Fowler (Stuart Wade) but he jilts her at the altar. Kathy soon becomes a victim in a hit-and-run caused by Kim's second husband Steve Marchant (Paul Opacic), who was in the midst of stealing a horse to save Kim's financial troubles. Kim later manipulates Kathy into believing that Steve was solely behind the horse theft, thus leading Kathy to believe that Steve had intended to kill her without Kim's knowledge; Steve is consequently arrested and Kathy testifies against Steve but soon learns of Kim's involvement, when Chris publicly accuses her of killing Frank. Although Steve is found guilty of Kathy's attempted murder and sentenced to 10 years in prison for the crime, with the addition of serving 12 months each for theft and obtaining money by deception, Kim eludes facing justice for her nefarious activities after escaping the village in a helicopter with James – though not before nearly killing Chris, after attacking him with an ornament. Kathy visits Chris as he recovers and the pair become friends again but Kathy refuses to try out another relationship between them – much to Chris's disappointment. The two are later devastated to learn that Rachel has died. After her funeral Kathy grows close to her former boyfriend, Graham Clark (Kevin Pallister), and they soon begin a relationship. The pair eventually decide to leave the village for a fresh start of their own but things spiral out of control when Kathy discovers that Graham had actually killed Rachel and confronts him about it. This causes Graham to snap and force Kathy to lose control of the car, unwittingly sending them to the edge of the cliff. Kathy manages to escape, just as the car falls down the cliff, but Graham is unable to escape and is killed in the resulting explosion.

Kathy's attempt to move on from her trauma with Graham becomes short-lived when she gets involved in a bus accident, when the vehicle is hit by a Tate Haulage company lorry which had run out of control; she survives, while her friend, Butch Dingle (Paul Loughran), is fatally injured and he later passes away in hospital. Kathy mounts a protest against the company but is imprisoned for a short while. When Jack Sugden (Clive Hornby) is arrested for the suspected murder of his estranged wife, Sarah (Alyson Spiro), Kathy moves into the farm to look after the children, Andy (Kelvin Fletcher), Robert (Christopher Smith) and Victoria (Hannah Midgley). Struggling to cope, Kathy nearly has a mental breakdown when Robert and Andy argue incessantly and the herd of cows contracts tuberculosis. Kathy leaves Emmerdale in December 2001 to go to Australia with her niece, Alice Bates (Rachel Tolboys), when Alice's mother Elsa Chappell (Natasha Gray) wants her to emigrate. The following year news reaches Emmerdale that Kathy has since married and given birth to a healthy baby girl. Kathy returns to the village when she accompanies Seth Armstrong back to reunite with his long-term companion, Betty Eagleton (Paula Tilbrook). However, Seth dies on the flight back to the UK, so Kathy stays for the funeral, before returning to Australia.

== Reception ==
Commenting on the character's bad luck with marriage, Sue Smith of the Daily Mirror commented "local vamp Kathy has had more wedding dresses than most of us have had hot dinners".
