= Annie Sugden =

Fictional character from Emmerdale

- Emmerdale character
- Portrayed by: Sheila Mercier
- Duration: 1972–1996, 2009
- First appearance: Episode 1; 16 October 1972
- Last appearance: Episode 5218/5219; 10 February 2009
- Created by: Kevin Laffan
- Introduced by: David Goddard (1972); Mervyn Watson (1995, 1996); Anita Turner (2009)
In-universe information
- Other names: Annie Pearson; Annie Kempinski; Annie Brearly
- Occupation: Farmer
- Father: Sam Pearson
- Mother: Grace Pearson
- Husband: Jacob Sugden (backstory); Leonard Kempinski (1993); Amos Brearly (1995–2020)
- Sons: Jack Sugden; Joe Sugden
- Daughters: Peggy Skilbeck
- Grandsons: Jackie Merrick; Sam Skilbeck; Robert Sugden; Andy Sugden (adoptive)
- Granddaughters: Sally Skilbeck; Victoria Sugden
- Aunts: Rosemary Kendall
- First cousins: Arthur Kendall; Beryl Crossthwaite
- Other relatives: Sharon Crossthwaite; Sebastian White; Harry Sugden; Sarah Sugden (adoptive); Jack Sugden (adoptive)

Annie Sugden (also Pearson, Kempinski and Brearly) is a fictional character from the British television soap opera Emmerdale. She was played by Sheila Mercier as a regular character between 1972 and 1994, with occasional guest appearances in the show after her original departure. Mercier cut back on location filming during the late 1980s and eventually left the serial in 1994 due to the gruelling schedule. Annie was one of Emmerdale's original characters, appearing in its first episode on 16 October 1972 and became the longest serving female character in the series' history. She was the soap's "first matriarch", the maternal force behind the Sugden family, who were collectively one of Emmerdale's main focal points.

Over the years, the character featured in a number of storylines, including being widowed twice, coping with the deaths of various other family members, financial woes, nearly dying in a farmhouse fire, an addiction to tranquillisers and sustaining injuries in the Emmerdale plane crash, which left her in a three-month coma. Mercier and Frazer Hines, who played her on-screen son Joe Sugden, were the only two original cast members to appear in the show for its 20th anniversary. Though the character left the serial in 1994, she went on to make further occasional appearances until 1996 and last appeared on-screen in February 2009, in a special tribute episode to mark the death of Clive Hornby, who played Annie's son Jack Sugden. Despite having married Amos off-screen in late 1995, she was credited upon her return in 2009 by her most famous name, Annie Sugden. Mercier also made an appearance in 2000 for a special web broadcast in which Annie talked to her troubled screen son Jack. The broadcast was available for viewers to download on the official Emmerdale website. Mercier died in December 2019 and this was written into the soap, with Annie dying off-screen in August 2020.

== Creation and development ==
Annie Sugden was created by Kevin Laffan, the creator of what was then known as Emmerdale Farm who also wrote the serial's first 212 episodes. Laffan was said to be "keen on dominant women" and it has been said that he created a "memorable heroine" in Annie Sugden, "the wife of the ne'er-do-well…who drank himself to an early grave" (the first episode opened with his funeral). The show originally focused upon the struggles of Annie and her family, with the first episode of Emmerdale Farm (1972) being billed as "the living story of the Sugden family – the excitement of country life around."

Actress Sheila Mercier – whose career had been mainly theatrical – was chosen to play the role and went on to be the serial's longest running original actor. Mercier has commented "I had done a lot of television from the stage of the Whitehall, but very little else before joining Emmerdale Farm…I remember, at first, playing to the Gods! Tristan de Vere Cole, one of the first directors on the programme, told me to take [my performance] down until it was so low I was almost muttering. Then, Gordon Flemyng – another of the directors – played back to me a scene I did so that I could see what I had done wrong." In her 1994 autobiography, Mercier recalls how on so many occasions she wanted Annie to cry but the director, David Green, said "Annie does not cry. She cries all her tears into the pillow at night."

The character of Annie Sugden has been described as a firm favourite with viewers, from the opening scene of Emmerdale Farm with Annie standing in the farmhouse kitchen, to the day she left. As peacekeeper between her sons, Joe (Frazer Hines) and Jack (Andrew Burt/Clive Hornby), Annie was soon placed at the centre of the soap's action. The character was involved in numerous storylines, including marriages, bereavements, tragedies and family problems. Commenting on her "most gripping" storylines, Mercier has said, "Annie's daughter, Peggy Skilbeck's (Jo Kendall) death, Peggy's twins' deaths and Annie's father, Sam Pearson's (Toke Townley) death, which all called for lots of tears."

In the 1985 Emmerdale Farm Celebration Edition 1000 Episodes Magazine, Annie's personality is described:

Ever since she was widowed thirteen years ago, Annie Sugden has felt responsible for Emmerdale Farm and the Sugden family. Life has not been easy for her, coping with financial crises, warring sons and the loss of her only daughter. But she has faced the problems courageously. She's a strong, level headed woman, loyal to her family but not blind to their weaknesses, and she speaks her mind when she feels it's called for. Annie's honesty is usually appreciated and people often turn to her for advice, but the years haven't dulled her sense of humour. She enjoys a joke as much as anyone in the family.

Commenting on her character in 1985, Mercier said: "Annie Sugden has changed a great deal over the years. At the beginning she was very terse. She was the head of the family and let everyone know it. She ruled with a rod of iron. She'd had a tough life. She'd had a rough ride with her husband Jacob, who used to drink the money away and sit in the Woolpack until all hours. Her son Jack didn't live at home then and it was Annie who kept the farm together. Until Henry Wilks (Arthur Pentelow) came along they were poor farmers, living hand-to-mouth. But now things are different. Jack has made a success of Emmerdale and Henry's interest in the farm and Annie herself has made her relax. She's mellower now."

Despite suffering from arthritis, Mercier managed to undertake location filming for the show from 1972–1990. In the final episode of Emmerdale Farm before the transition to Emmerdale, broadcast in November 1989, she appeared on location at Lindley Farm near Harrogate, which served as the exterior for Emmerdale Farm, for scenes in which Annie greeted son Jack on his return from a trip to Italy.

Annie Sugden as she appeared in 2009.

Annie receives three proposals of marriage during her time in the show. The first is local resident Amos Brearly (Ronald Magill). Mercier told a reporter from TVTimes that Annie did not take his request seriously, laughed at him and refused. In another story, Henry proposes marriage to Annie. Mercier claimed that Annie declined his offer because she thought it would ruin their good friendship. In another storyline she received a shock proposal from her driving instructor. When Annie meets Polish national Leonard Kempinski (Bernard Archard) during a trip to Spain, she becomes very fond of him. Annie initially turns down his marriage proposal but later reconsiders. Mercier revealed that "she's a good judge of character. I think they are marrying for companionship; even so, Annie would love a little romance."

From the early 1990s, Sheila Mercier cut back on her appearances, usually working only in the studio. However, she appeared on location in a car during the 1993 plane crash episodes. Annie Sugden reportedly poured more than 6,000 cups of tea in the farmhouse studio, where she was most often seen. After she retired in 1994, she has appeared in only a handful of Emmerdale episodes, making guest appearances in 1995 and 1996. However, in 2000 she came out of retirement briefly to take part in a special internet mini-drama, which ran side by side with the Emmerdale television broadcast. Mercier talked live on the Net with her troubled screen son, Jack, played by Clive Hornby. The broadcast was available for viewers to download on the official Emmerdale website. Mercier was also invited to return to the Emmerdale set to celebrate with the crew at the official 30th anniversary party. In an interview in 2002, Mercier said she had no desire to return to acting, "I don't want to act. I watch TV, read and live like an ordinary person." However, for the show's 5000th episode in May 2008 a special documentary was transmitted across the ITV network, Mercier (aged 89) made another appearance along with Hines, Frederick Pyne and Jean Rogers the actors who played Joe, Matt and Dolly Skilbeck, respectively.

In February 2009, Mercier reprised the role of Annie for two episodes, where Annie attended her son Jack's funeral, following the death of actor Clive Hornby. Mercier said, "It will be a pleasure to return for this special tribute episode to Clive. I'm sure it will be a fitting way to celebrate the life and memory of one of Emmerdale's dearest characters". This was Mercier's last appearance before her retirement from acting, and her death in December 2019.

On 18 August 2020 it was announced Annie would die off-screen on 28 August, after Sheila Mercier's death in December 2019.

== Storylines ==
Annie Sugden was born on 5 July 1920, she was the only child of young labourer Sam Pearson and his wife Grace. Annie marries local farmer Jacob Sugden and he moves her into Emmerdale Farm. They have three children; Jack, Peggy and Joe. Annie's mother dies in the same year her daughter Peggy marries Matt Skilbeck. The audience is introduced to farmer's wife Annie Sugden in the soap's first episode in 1972. It was a time of sadness for the Sugden family, as Annie was burying her recently deceased husband, Jacob, who had died after spending much of his later years in the pub, The Woolpack, drinking away the family's farming profits. Early central storylines in the serial followed Annie as she struggled to come to terms with the death of her husband, support her family, and run Emmerdale Farm, set in the Yorkshire Dales in the fictional village of Beckindale. Matriarchal Annie aimed to rebuild the ailing farm by reuniting her two feuding sons, Jack and Joe. She sold part of Emmerdale Farm to village outsider, Henry Wilks, who had made his fortune in the wool industry and brought his business acumen to Beckindale. Early in the series, Woolpack landlord Amos Brearly decided a woman's touch was needed in his pub and proposes to Annie but she turns him down. Tragedy follows the Sugdens; Peggy dies of a brain haemorrhage a few months after giving birth to twins and three years later, Peggy's twins are killed on a level crossing, leaving Annie to comfort their father Matt. Annie's father Sam dies and Jack's wife, Pat Sugden dies two years later, forcing Annie to help Jack raise his young son Robert Sugden. A few years later, Emmerdale Farm begins collapsing due to subsidence. Although the family moves into Hawthorn Cottage, Annie remains unhappy until it was renamed Emmerdale Farm.

Annie and her second husband, Leonard Kempinski, whom she had married in October, plan to go on holiday to Spain. The night they are supposed to fly out, a plane crash into the village. As Joe is driving them to the airport, the wing of the plane collides with the car. Joe escapes with a broken leg; however, Annie is in a coma for several months. The cries of her new granddaughter Victoria Sugden finally wake Annie from her coma but she is devastated to discover Leonard has died. Widowed again, Annie is left to mourn a second husband. At Jack's wedding to Sarah Connolly, Amos announces that the residents of Beckindale have decided to rename the village Emmerdale, in honour of Annie. He remarks that people had voted for the name Emmerdale as they held Annie in such high regard. After moving to Spain in July 1994, Annie returns to Emmerdale the following year to bury her son Joe, who had died in a car accident. 23 years after his first proposal, Amos Brearly proposes to Annie again; this time she accepts. Annie and Amos return to Spain where they marry on 5 November 1995, though Annie returns briefly in November 1996 to ask Jack to sell Emmerdale Farm; he refuses. After a 13-year absence, Annie returns to the village for Jack's funeral. Jack had been staying with her in Spain and had suffered a fatal heart attack; she accompanies his body to Emmerdale. She grieves with Jack's family, which includes his widow Diane Sugden, Victoria, and his adoptive son Andy Sugden, before returning to Spain after his funeral.

Following her departure, Annie is often contacted and mentioned by her relatives, many of whom go to stay with her during times of crisis. Diane goes to stay with Annie after she takes ill and stays for two months. Following Victoria's rape, Victoria and Robert go on holiday but lie and say that Annie is ill and they need to look after her. Months later, Victoria receives a phone call from Diane with news that Annie has died peacefully at the age of 100 on 28 August 2020, Victoria then heads down south to meet some distant cousins, to arrange Annie's funeral. Her ashes were scattered by Victoria over the fields that once belonged to 'Emmerdale Farm'.

In February 2026, Robert finds the old Emmerdale Farm stone in Annie's field and mentions to Aaron Dingle that Annie touched that stone many times over the years.

== In other media ==
The character Annie Sugden has been the topic of several tie-in books related to the Emmerdale serial. These include Annie Sugden's Country Diary, written by Lee Mackenzie and published in 1978. The novel gives Annie's account of her childhood and early adult life in Beckindale. It is described as a "story of the long, hot summers between the wars, the village school and the open fields [..] Annie's heart-warming memories of the good times and the hard times amongst honest working folk in the Yorkshire dales [...] the Diary of a country lass who loves life, despite its trials and tribulations". The novel gives an account of Annie's parents, her "sensitive musical" mother, her "down-to-earth, prosaic" father, her "first and truest" love, Laurence Stanton, and her "reluctant" marriage to Jacob Sugden, right up until she became the owner of Emmerdale Farm. Annie Sugden's Emmerdale Farm Cookbook was also released in 1984.

== Reception ==
The character was selected as one of the "top 100 British soap characters" by industry experts for a poll to be run by What's on TV, with readers able to vote for their favourite character to discover "Who is Soap's greatest Legend?"
