= Pat Sugden =

Fictional character from Emmerdale

- Emmerdale character
- Helen Weir as Pat Sugden
- Portrayed by: Lynn Dalby (1972–1974); Helen Weir (1980–1986)
- Duration: 1972, 1974, 1980–1986
- First appearance: 6 November 1972
- Last appearance: 26 August 1986
- Created by: Kevin Laffan
- Introduced by: David Goddard (1972); Anne Gibbons (1980)
In-universe information
- Other names: Ruth Merrick; Pat Merrick
- Father: David Harker
- Mother: Dolly Harker
- Brothers: Syd Harker
- Sisters: Janie Blakey
- Husband: Tom Merrick (until 1973); Jack Sugden (1982–1986)
- Sons: Jackie Merrick; Tommy Merrick; Robert Sugden
- Daughters: Sandie Merrick
- Grandsons: Sebastian White
- Granddaughters: Louise Merrick
- Uncles: Tom Harker
- Aunts: Elsie Harker

Patricia Ruth "Pat" Sugden (also Harker and Merrick) is a fictional character from the British soap opera Emmerdale, played by actresses Lynn Dalby in 1972 and 1974. Helen Weir took over the role when Pat was reintroduced as a regular character in 1980. Pat's main stories are her marriages to violent drunk, Tom Merrick (Dave Hill) and later Jack Sugden (Clive Hornby). One of Pat's most prominent storylines involved the reveal of her son, Jackie Merrick (Ian Sharrock), being Jack's biological son. Weir and Hornby began a relationship off-screen and later married. Weir became pregnant and writers decided to make Pat also pregnant and she gives birth to Robert Sugden. Producers offered Weir an additional two-year contract to remain in Emmerdale but she declined their offer. Weir later revealed that her decision came from a dispute with producers over the inclusion of her and Hornby's son playing the role of Robert. Producers decided to kill Pat off in a car accident story and she made her final appearance during the episode broadcast on 26 August 1986.

== Development ==
=== Creation and characterisation ===
Pat is characterised as a "passionate and strong minded" woman. Pat easily settles into farm life and contributes by taking over control of Sam Pearson's (Toke Townley) vegetable garden. In her backstory, Pat was born in Beckindale, the village in which the soap opera was originally set. Pat's maiden name is Harker.

When the character was introduced in 1972, she was also known as Ruth Merrick. She arrives with her husband, Tom Merrick (Dave Hill), and their two children, Jackie Merrick (uncredited) and Sandie Merrick (Jenny Mayors-Clark). Pat's relationship with Tom was troublesome owing to his alcoholism and he was violent towards her. Shortly after Pat's arrival, her ex-boyfriend Jack Sugden (Clive Hornby) returns to the village. In the book 50 Years of Emmerdale, author Tom Parfitt stated that Pat always loved Jack, despite her marriage to Tom. He added that Tom "was a lousy husband, a drunk, openly violent towards Pat and jealous of Jack's return to the village". In his book Emmerdale Family Album, Michael Heatley described the Merrick marriage as "disastrous". Writers created a romantic backstory between Pat and Jack. Pat had been in a relationship with Jack in 1964, but he left her and moved to London. This left Pat on the rebound and she marries Tom. When Pat and Jack become reacquainted, they reminisce over their past relationship. This makes Tom jealous and he questions the nature of their relationship. Pat tries to convince Tom that she no longer loves Jack, but he remains suspicious. Pat later convinces Jack to sack Tom from his job, forcing the Merrick family to move away. In her later appearances, writers continued to portray Pat's marriage to Tom as problematic and they later divorce.

=== Reintroduction ===
Pat was reintroduced into Emmerdale in 1980. She returns with her two children, Jackie and Sandy, now played by Ian Sharrock and Jane Hutcheson, respectively. Pat soon reunites with Jack. The year 1981 saw the introduction of a new story for Pat, in which it is revealed that Jackie is Jack's biological son. Pat became pregnant by Jack and quickly began a relationship with Tom to conceal the pregnancy. The reveal scenes occurred during an episode featuring an argument between Pat and Jack. Jackie discovers the truth in 1982 and writers used the reveal to put Jackie in place as the rightful heir to Emmerdale Farm. Jackie resented both Pat and Jack following the discovery. In 1982, writers married Pat and Jack. The story had been planned prior to Pat's reintroduction. Sharrock later revealed that producers informed him of the story when he joined the cast in 1980. He added that it was difficult for Jackie to accept Jack as his father because he spent years trying to gain Tom's approval, despite him being an "unreliable" father figure.

=== Marriage to Jack Sugden ===
They portrayed the Sugden marriage in stark contrast to the ideal marriage between Matt (Frederick Pyne) and Dolly Skilbeck (Jean Rogers). Pat's strong mindset often leads to arguments with Jack but they appear to enjoy this. Unlike the Skilbecks, Pat and Jack would be bored with a tranquil life and "enjoy the stimulation of pitting their wits against each other". Writers continued to give Pat marriage issues and Jack has an affair with Karen Moore (Annie Hulley). His affair makes Pat question whether or not she made the correct decision marrying Jack. Another issue writers explored was Jack's relationship with Pat's children, including Sandie, which causes more friction. Off-screen, Weir and Hornby began a relationship and later married. Weir told Cozens that portraying the affair was not challenging and her rapport with Hornby allowed them to perform better during filming. She explained: "[There were] no problems. We were simply working and it didn't impinge on our own lives. Jack and Pat aren't us or like us, but I suppose it was easier doing something like that with Clive because we know each other so well."

=== Pregnancy and departure ===
Pat later becomes pregnant, and during the episode broadcast on 22 April 1986, she gives birth to a boy, Robert Sugden. During Weir's pregnancy, writers had to change Pat's usual scenes featuring her working on the farm. Hornby told Maureen Cozens from Sunday Sun that "they've written out any scenes of Pat driving the tractor or dipping the sheep – she used to do quite heavy stuff, which Helen can't at the moment". The pregnancy storyline was created following blurring between fiction and reality. Weir became pregnant with Hornby's child and gave birth in to a son in December 1985. Producers decided to write the pregnancy into Pat's storyline and wanted them to include their new-born child in the Emmerdale Farm cast. Weir and Hornby were willing to oblige on the condition the child would be referred to by his real name on-screen. Weir and Hornby called their son Thomas but this polarised producers, who believed that Pat would never call their son Thomas, as Pat's abusive husband was also named Tom. The show's producers offered Weir a new two-year contract and wanted the child to be called Robert in the series. This would have required Weir and Hornby to refer to their own child as Robert on-set, which they were not comfortable with. Weir decided to turn down the contract renewal and they decided to write Pat out of the series.

Hornby told Syd Gillingham from the Derby Telegraph that he and Weir were apprehensive of accepting the producers' offer because their characters could have later been written out. He believed that had they have accepted the producers' proposal of including their child, he may have answered to Robert instead of Thomas. Weir added that producers were willing to let her act with another baby while filming scenes. She stated that the offer was "ludicrous" because she would bring her own child to set and look after another child during filming in parallel to each other. Of her decision to leave, Weir added: "I shall miss playing Pat – they have been six happy years. But you can't allow a television programme to intrude on real life. There's little doubt that in years to come we'll look back on the decision we had to make and be even more sure that it was the right one under all the circumstances."

Writers decided to kill Pat off in a car-crash storyline. Pat takes her sister, Janie Blakey (Lesley Duff), to the train station and on her way back she is killed in a crash. The crash scenes occurred following Pat using her Ford Fiesta vehicle and over-taking a milk lorry, then swerving to avoid a flock of sheep. The vehicle then rolled down a hill and killed Pat in the wreckage. Weir's departure and Pat's death was announced prior to the broadcast. Photographs taken during the filming of Pat's funeral were published in the Daily Record on 25 July 1986. They detailed the dispute between Weir and producers. An Emmerdale publicist confirmed that it was Weir's decision to leave the role, adding that "obviously Pat Sugden is going to be sadly missed by all the viewers". The crash and Pat's final on-screen appearance occurred during the episode broadcast on 26 August 1986.

== Storylines ==
In September 1980, Ruth, now calling herself Pat, returns to Beckindale with Jackie and Sandie to stay with her aunt Elsie after she separates from Tom. Elsie refuses to let them live in her home owing to her children's noise making. She moves into a small caravan. Pat begins dating Jack and Tom later returns. He tries to frame Jack for arson but Jack provides an alibi. Seth Armstrong discovers Tom's schemes and orders him to leave Beckindale or he will reveal his role in the arson.

In 1982, Pat and Jack marry and are happy in their union until 1984, when Jack has an affair with a reporter named Karen. The couple break up for a while but later reconcile. In 1985, Pat discovers she is pregnant. In April 1986, she gives birth to a son, Robert Sugden, which brings her and Jack closer together. However, in August Pat dies after her car crashes down a hillside when she swerves to avoid a flock of sheep. Pat has an on-screen funeral and is buried in the village churchyard. Jack is left to bring up Robert alone.

== Reception ==
The Sunday Sun's Maureen Cozens praised Jack's affair storyline, stating that "the scenes provided some of the best, most challenging acting for the two of them". She described Pat as not very vivacious and with a "dreary voice", especially when the character says "Jaack luv".
