= Seth Armstrong =

Fictional character from Emmerdale

- Emmerdale character
- Portrayed by: Stan Richards
- Duration: 1978–2004
- First appearance: 16 May 1978
- Last appearance: 24 December 2004
- Introduced by: David Cunliffe
In-universe information
- Occupation: Gamekeeper
- Wife: Meg Armstrong (until 1993)
- Sons: Jimmy Armstrong; Fred Armstrong

Seth Armstrong is a fictional character from the British ITV soap opera Emmerdale, played by Stan Richards from 1978 until 2004. The role of Seth began as a temporary "bit part" and he was due to appear for just a few episodes, but proved so popular that further appearances were made until Seth became a full-time regular character in the summer of 1980. Seth continuously annoyed the landlord Amos Brearly and later Alan Turner who took over in 1991, who memorably often shouted "Get out Seth!".

His memorable storylines included his turbulent relationship with his wife Meg and then later Betty Eagleton (Paula Tilbrook), dealing with his guilt over the death of Jackie Merrick (Ian Sharrock), the death of his wife, a friendship with Kim Tate (Claire King) and in his final years, his ailing health. After appearing as a semi-regular character from 1978 to 1980 and then permanently from 1980 to 2003, the character was absent throughout 2004 due to Richards' ill health, only appearing briefly by video message that December. Richards hoped to return to the serial full-time, but his death in February 2005 prevented this and producers opted to kill off the character as a result, with Seth dying on the flight over from Australia back to Leeds and the village that October.

== Storylines ==
Seth started out as the school's boiler man living with his wife, Meg. He was originally a poacher but became gamekeeper in 1981. He swapped the Malt Shovel (Beckindale's other pub) for the Woolpack that summer. In 1981, he forced local hardnut Tom Merrick (Edward Peel) out of the village after Tom tried to frame Jack Sugden in an arson attack. Seth and Meg had marriage difficulties in 1983, which resulted in him sleeping in a shed at Home Farm for a while. However, he won her back with a bottle of port. In 1985, he opened up a NY social club to create rivalry for The Woolpack but the beer made everyone ill and he only made a profit of 10p before closing down. He later attempted to hire entertainment for The Woolpack by booking strippers who could tame snakes to entertain the pub but Amos refused to allow it.

In 1983, it was revealed that Seth was in fact his middle name as his NY Estates work records said A.S. Armstrong; Jackie Merrick (Ian Sharrock) asked him what the A stood for and Seth replied "Archibald". He was never known as Archibald however and always used his middle name as his common name.

In August 1989, a fox was bothering Beckindale; Seth and Jackie went into the woods to shoot it but Jackie accidentally shot himself. Seth was devastated and felt it should have been him who died instead.

An amusing postscript occurred in 1991, when Alan Turner and Henry Wilks (Arthur Pentelow) read Amos Brearly's (Ronald Magill) diaries and discovered that Seth was, in fact, an illegitimate descendant of the Verney family. However, any possible claims to ownership of Home Farm was obscured by NY's purchase and subsequent sale to Frank Tate (Norman Bowler).

In February 1993, Meg died and Seth's neighbours helped him with the house work to help him overcome his grief. More trouble arose for him in December when his house was destroyed due to the Emmerdale plane crash. Alan feared that Seth had been killed and felt guilty as he had thrown him out of the Woolpack just before the crash happened, but he turned out to be unharmed. Things looked up for him in April 1994 when he met old flame Betty Eagleton, who had also been widowed months before. They planned to marry later that year after Seth proposed to her but instead decided just to live together and made their relationship official in December 1994 with a 1940s-themed night, moving into Keepers Cottage together the following year. Seth was also claimed a hero that year after accidentally shooting "the beast of Beckindale", which turned out to be a wild boar.

Seth was friends with Kim Tate and tried to unsuccessfully defend her in January 1997 after her lover Dave Glover (Ian Kelsey) died and everyone turned on her for her affair with Dave. He later gave her away when she married Steve Marchant in 1998. In October 1998, Seth was chosen to officially reopen the Woolpack after it had burned down earlier in the year. He agreed to do so and received his own seat at the pub.

In March 2000, Seth was caught in the bus crash and Betty feared he had been killed. However, he was alive but was injured in hospital. Things got worse for Seth in September when he won money on the horses but was later mugged by some young girls and briefly developed agoraphobia. However, the villagers helped to bring him out of it. Later that year he celebrated his 74th birthday which the village had thought was his 75th and threw him a party in The Woolpack, however he decided not to tell them so as not to hurt their feelings.

Seth got a computer in 2002, and had a webcam set up by Robert Sugden (Karl Davies), which Seth used to show Betty's daily routine, getting himself free breakfasts at Cafe Hope in return. When Edna Birch told Betty what he was doing, she was heartbroken, and left Seth, telling him via webcam, but Seth apologised publicly, and they reunited. Seth and Betty briefly separated again in December 2002 when Betty visited Kathy Brookman and her newborn baby in Australia. She returned in March 2003, full of how great Australia was. Seth was worried she may move there, but she assured him that she would never leave Emmerdale.

In September 2003, Seth went to visit Kathy and never returned to the village. Betty was upset when he failed to return for Christmas but he made up for it by booking her a flight to visit him in Australia. Seth made two final cameo appearances in 2004: a telephone message left on Betty's answering machine and finally over the Internet, as seen on a laptop in The Woolpack that Christmas Eve. Richards was keen to reprise his role, but on 11 February 2005, he died of emphysema and several months later, out of respect for the actor, an off-screen death for the character occurred. Seth died on 30 October 2005 from a heart attack after having been ill for a while in Australia, whilst on the plane flying back to England.

In 2023, Kim tricks Caleb Miligan by creating a businessman called Seth Armstrong. After she catches Caleb lying to her, she tells him that Seth Armstrong is actually a fake businessman she made up to trick him, but in fact is the former gamekeeper at Home Farm and one of her closest friends.
