= Matt Skilbeck =

Fictional character from Emmerdale

- Emmerdale character
- Portrayed by: Frederick Pyne
- Duration: 1972–1989
- First appearance: Episode 1; 16 October 1972
- Last appearance: Episode 1410; 7 December 1989
- Created by: Kevin Laffan
- Introduced by: David Goddard
In-universe information
- Occupation: Sheep farmer
- Father: Oliver Skilbeck
- Mother: Elizabeth Skilbeck
- Wife: Peggy Skilbeck (until 1973); Dolly Skilbeck (1978–1990, 1992–present)
- Sons: Sam Skilbeck; Samuel Skilbeck
- Daughters: Sally Skilbeck
- Grandfathers: Clive Skilbeck; Michael Barlow
- Grandmothers: Mildred Barlow
- Uncles: Ned Barlow
- Aunts: Beattie Dowton; Sarah Barlow
- First cousins: Polly Ferris

Matt Skilbeck is a fictional character from the British television soap opera Emmerdale, played by Frederick Pyne. He is one of the series' original characters and made his debut in the first episode broadcast on 16 October 1972. Pyne was interviewed for the role in 1971 and cast the following year. He came into the show with farming knowledge and an expectation that he would only be in it for five years. Matt is a sheep farmer and married to Peggy Skilbeck (Jo Kendall) at the beginning of the serial. Matt is characterised as mild-mannered, honest, and stubborn, although Pyne thought his character was too nice. Following Peggy's death and those of his children, Matt marries barmaid Dolly Acaster (Katharine Barker; Jean Rogers). A change in Matt's personality occurs when quarry owner Harry Mowlem (Godfrey James) makes advances towards Dolly and Matt attacks him, leading to his arrest for Mowlem's murder. Pyne decided to leave Emmerdale in 1989 to pursue work in the theatre. He was unhappy that the writers chose to split Matt and Dolly up, as they had been one of the few remaining happy families in soap at the time.

== Creation and casting ==
Matt is one of the eight original main characters conceived by playwright and creator of Emmerdale, Kevin Laffan. After the show's story was mapped out, casting director Sue Whatmough, producer David Goddard, director Tristan de Vere Cole, and Laffan began the casting process. Actor Frederick Pyne had been earmarked for the role of Matt in 1971, following his appearance in the television legal drama Justice. He told Anthony Hayward of The Emmerdale Companion that the producer of Justice had "put in a good word" for him. He recalled that at the end of his first interview, he was told not to think too much about it, as the show might not go ahead. A year later, he was asked to meet with Goddard and Laffan, who cast him as Matt. Pyne and his co-stars were taken on for 26 episodes, with an option for another 26. He said that none of them were aware of how popular the serial would become. Unlike the other cast members at the time, Pyne had farming knowledge as he worked on a farm on the borders of Cambridgeshire and Hertfordshire when he was younger. Pyne admitted that his biggest fear was forgetting his lines and he said he was "very irritable" while learning them, so he liked to be left alone. Pyne thought he would only be in the serial for five years, but he stayed for 17. He said he had an enjoyable time until near the end.

== Development ==
Emmerdale originally centred on the Sudgen family, who ran Emmerdale Farm just outside Beckindale village, with the initial episodes focusing on the death of patriarch Jacob and the return of his eldest son Jack (Andrew Burt), who has been left the farm by his father. Jo Kendall was cast as Matt's wife, Peggy, who resents her brother inheriting the farm as she feels it belongs to the rest of the family. Pyne immediately identified with his character and the Sugden family, explaining: "When they described Matt and Peggy to me as an ordinary farming couple, with Peggy being the daughter of the Sugdens, I said, 'I know these people.'" Matt was initially billed as "a content countryman" who does not hold the same ambitions as his wife, who had hoped that selling their share of the farm would lead to a move to suburbia. Matt is happiest when he is enjoying his job on the farm and he feels he has done "a fair day's work", however, his love for his wife means he will allow her to win and he will break away from the farm for Peggy's happiness.

Soap Box author Hilary Kingsley described Matt as a "mild-mannered sheep-farmer". She observed that he is slow moving and slow talking, likening his speaking voice to that of "dictation speed." She also called him "a plodder" and "stubborn when his temper is aroused". Pyne thought that Matt was "too nice and goody-goody" during his tenure. The character's decent, honest nature was true to Laffan's ideal. Matt's storylines often revolved around his family and affected by tragedy. Shortly after giving birth to their twins Sam and Sally Skilbeck (Jamie and Justine Bell), Peggy dies from a brain hemorrhage. The twins and Matt's aunt are later killed when a train hits their car. Matt "spent the night stumbling around on the moors", with Kingsley noting that Matt was "totally grief-stricken". The character later marries Dolly Acaster (Katharine Barker; Jean Rogers). She has a miscarriage at eight months, but they go on to have a son Samuel Skilbeck (Benjamin Whitehead).

A different side to the normally laid back character emerges when Harry Mowlem (Godfrey James) begins making advances towards Dolly. Matt later attacks the quarry owner and Pyne justified his character's actions, explaining: "Mowlem was such a monster that even the most placid person would lose their temper." Matt is arrested for manslaughter when Mowlem is found dead, but he is released when criminal Derek Warner (Dennis Blanch) later admits to Mowlem's murder.

Pyne decided to leave Emmerdale in 1989 to pursue theatrical work. He explained "I was approaching 50 and thought that, if I didn't get out soon and do other good character work in the theatre, I never would." He told Wendy Granditer of Inside Soap that he was happy to stay all those years, and he had "a lovely time", but he felt he had done enough. He also disliked the show's move away from farming to more sensational plots featuring sex and violence. Pyne's departure also coincided with that of Laffan's. He filmed his last scenes on 5 November 1989.

On-screen, Dolly has an affair, ending her and Matt's marriage. Pyne expressed his dislike of the plot, believing that it was out of character. He thought it was sad that one of the "few good, happy families" in soap had to be split up. He felt that there should be "at least one happy family per soap, otherwise it's all rows." Pyne found it fairly easy to move on from Emmerdale. He secured a role in a pantomime, followed by various stage productions. He kept in touch in with his co-stars, including Sheila Mercier (Annie Sugden). Pyne later said he regretted being on Emmerdale for so long, as he felt typecast. He said: "I wouldn't advise young actors to stay in a soap for too long because it can do them as much harm as good."

== Storylines ==
Matt is married to Peggy Sugden and helps out on the Sugdens' farm. Peggy becomes concerned for their future when the farm is bequeathed to her brother Jack Sugden, after their father's death. Peggy finds out she is pregnant and encourages Matt to pursue a factory job in Hotten. During the interview, Matt objects to being described as an "unskilled labourer" and stays on in Beckindale to work for Emmerdale Farm Ltd. Peggy gives birth to twins, Sam and Sally, but dies of a brain haemorrhage soon after. Upon his wife's death, Matt inherits her shares in Emmerdale Farm Ltd. The twins are sent to live with Matt's aunt Beattie Dowton (Barbara Ogilvie). All three are killed in a car crash when the children are just three years old.

Matt later marries Woolpack barmaid Dolly Acaster. Matt and Dolly convert a barn attached to the Emmerdale farm house into a cottage for them to live in. Dolly gives birth to their son Samuel, who is named after Matt's first-born son. Matt's former grandfather-in-law Sam Pearson (Toke Townley) is also pleased with the naming decision. Quarry owner Harry Mowlem begins harassing Dolly, to the couple's distress. Mowlem believes he has an old score to settle, as Matt had taken the dog Mowlem was ill treating away from him. Matt gets into a physical struggle with Mowlem after finding him stealing sheep. The following morning, Mowlem is found dead and Matt is charged with manslaughter. He is cleared when Mowlam's crooked associate Derek Warner confesses to the crime.

After the reclusive Mr Metcalfe (Bernard Kay) dies, Matt learns that Metcalfe has left him Crossgill farm in recognition of his help. Dolly insists that they move out of Emmerdale Farm, but Matt is reluctant. Crossgill is razed to the ground after builder Phil Pearce (Peter Alexander) leaves some rags to burn unattended in the farmhouse. Dolly and Matt grow apart and she has an affair with timber consultant Stephen Fuller (Gregory Floy). After the failure of his second marriage, Matt leaves the village to run a sheep farm in Norfolk, but later remarries Dolly after she and Sam join him.

Matt was mentioned after Annie’s death in 2020, when her granddaughter Victoria (Isabel Hodgins) visits Matt to arrange Annie's funeral.

== Reception ==
Jon Kelly of the Daily Mirror observed that "life was tough" for Matt, and branded him a "hapless farmhand". Writer and critic Hilary Kingsley called Matt "the most boring man in soap". Wendy Granditer of Inside Soap noted that "All Matt Skilbeck wanted was a quiet life".
