= Dolly Skilbeck =

Fictional character from Emmerdale

- Emmerdale character
- Jean Rogers as Dolly Skilbeck
- Portrayed by: Katharine Barker (1977–1979); Jean Rogers (1980–1991)
- Duration: 1977–1991
- First appearance: 22 February 1977
- Last appearance: 15 August 1991
- Introduced by: Michael Glynn
- Book appearances: Whispers of Scandal; Shadows From The Past; Lucky For Some
In-universe information
- Other names: Dolly Acaster
- Occupation: Barmaid; Housekeeper
- Father: Eric Acaster
- Mother: Phyllis Purwick
- Stepfather: Leonard Purwick
- Brothers: Raymond Acaster
- Husband: Matt Skilbeck (1978–1990)
- Sons: Graham Lodsworth; Samuel Skilbeck
- Aunts: Jessie Renfrew

Dolly Skilbeck (also Acaster) is a fictional character from the British television soap opera Emmerdale. Dolly made her first on-screen appearance during the episode broadcast on 22 February 1977. The character was initially played by Katharine Barker, before Jean Rogers took over the role in 1980. She remained in the role until her departure from Emmerdale in 1991. Dolly is characterised as kind, generous and a homemaker. She is a "townie" from Darlington who arrives in Beckindale to work at the local pub, The Woolpack. Writers quickly developed a romance with Matt Skilbeck (Frederick Pyne). He was a widower and had previously has two children that had died.

Writers shifted this tragic arc onto his relationship with Dolly as her pregnancies lead to further trauma. Dolly's first pregnancy ends in a still birth, her second a miscarriage but the third is successful and she gives birth to a son, Samuel Skilbeck (Benjamin Whitehead). Another storyline for Dolly features the revelation that she has an illegitimate child, Graham Lodsworth (Ross Kemp). Dolly and Matt live with Annie Sugden (Sheila Mercier) at the farm and Dolly has aspirations of owning her own family home at Crossgill farm. When the property burns down, Dolly's dreams of a better life are ruined and she almost has an affair with Stephen Fuller (Gregory Floy). Dolly and Matt later divorce when Pyne left the series. Rogers remained part of the cast until 1991, when executive producer Stuart Doughty had decided axe the character. Dolly leaves the show alongside Sam to live in Norfolk.

== Development ==
=== Recasting Dolly ===
Dolly was originally portrayed by actress Katharine Barker but the role was recast in 1980. While playing Dolly, Barker had lived in southern England but travelled to Yorkshire to film Emmerdale. She also had two sons and an actor husband who became ill. She decided to leave Emmerdale to alleviate the strain on her family commitments. Producers assessed that Matt had already suffered too much trauma over the deaths of his wife and two children. Matt was now happily married to Dolly and believed it would be better to recast Dolly than to have him suffer another tragedy.

Recasting characters was common practise in American shows but an unusual occurrence in a British soap opera. Jean Rogers' agent put her forward for the role but then the 1979 ITV strike occurred and delayed the casting process. Months after the strike, the agent informed Rogers about the part and she went to audition with around fifty other actresses. Of the audition process, Rogers stated that "we all must have looked like Katherine who played it before. Yeah and then I got the part." First Rogers made it onto the short list with five other actresses but her mother died from leukaemia before she won the role. Rogers later revealed that this made her casting a "bitter sweet" experience. She also had to move to Yorkshire and initially spent her working weekdays apart from her family. Rogers told Daniel Falconer from Female First that "I remember feeling so happy to be doing television drama again. The cast were very warm and welcoming."

Recasting the role did gain some disapproval from viewers and Rogers recalled "a lot of chatter" about it. To help facilitate the recast and have it appear more authentic on-screen, writers conjured up a way to temporarily write Dolly out of the series. They sent the character off for convalescence because she'd had a still birth. This meant that she would not be on-screen for a couple of months. However, the 1979 ITV strike ruined their plans as the network chose to rebroadcast old episodes. These episodes featured Barker's portrayal of Dolly and their intention of resting the character did not work. Rogers' first week on the show consisted of visiting sets and locations and her rehearsals for the part commenced the following week. The Emmerdale wardrobe team had offered to purchase new clothes for her. She refused because she believed that viewers would have a difficult time adjusting to a new face, so Dolly's attire should remain unchanged. With an agreement reached, Dolly's reintroduction saw her exiting a car having returned from the convalescent home in her original attire. Rogers regretted this decision and later requested clothing that fitted herself better, but the production team had removed the allocated budget.

Rogers recalled that Emmerdale producers were concerned about how she would portray Dolly. She believed it was an achievable acting challenge but they still gave her video tapes of Barker's portrayal to study. Rogers was approached by another producer at Yorkshire Television who advised her to play Dolly on her own terms. She realised that Emmerdale producers were pressurising her to copy Barker's portrayal of Dolly. Rogers noted that she could have copied Barker's mannerisms but any new storylines would have proved more difficult. Rogers explained that it would have been "far too convoluting" to continually interpret how Barker would have approached the scene. Thus, Rogers decided to make the role authentically her own and was confident on how to play Dolly after her first week on-set.

=== Characterisation and pregnancies ===
Matt and Dolly were quite serious, yes we were serious because we were very ordinary, but as a couple they had a lot of awful things happening to them, or possibly happening to them. I mean Dolly was kidnapped. [...] They lost babies, they went through a divorce. But people do manage to come through these things and I think a soap can give them that feeling of hope saying, "oh Dolly managed to overcome that". It is a sense of comfort.

— Rogers detailing Dolly and Matt's relatability. (2020)

Dolly is characterised as a kind and generous woman. She is a "townie" who arrives in Beckindale to escape unhappiness. She is portrayed as "bright and bubbly" which is in stark contrast to her "silent and placid" husband Matt Skilbeck (Frederick Pyne). Despite their differences, they appreciate one another's personalities and initially make their marriage a success. Dolly is also a "cheerful and good humoured" person. Dolly is also played as a "homemaker" and she used her spare time to help Amos Brearly (Ronald Magill) serve beer at The Woolpack pub. Rogers viewed Dolly as a "special sister" and felt protective of her. Dolly and Matt are a serious couple with stories to match. Rogers believed that people thought she was "boring" but she viewed her as a "generous person who needed a bit of protecting". Dolly would often be depicted washing dishes, waiting for Matt to return for his dinner and life of a farm. Rogers believed that it was "comfortable viewing" but reflected the reality of farming life. She went to farmers markets and discussed the realism of the characters with other actual farmers. In her later years she takes a job as Kim Tate's (Claire King) housekeeper and the two characters were completely different. Rogers branded Kim a "wonderful bitch part" she would have liked to play, buy playing a female like Dolly "was a responsibility".

Originally credited as Dolly Acaster, she appeared in the series as a barmaid. Dolly's introduction storyline saw her arriving in Beckindale from to take part in a brewery training scheme at the local pub, The Woolpack. Dolly had moved to the area from Darlington. Dolly meets farmhand Matt and they fall in love. Matt was a widower after his first wife Peggy Skilbeck (Jo Kendall) died. They had two children Sam (Jamie Bell) and Sally Skilbeck (Justine Bell), who were killed in an accident when a train hits their car. She described Matt as a "salt of the earth" type character. She also had a good rapport with Pyne, Rogers recalled that "Freddie is professional, he was so welcoming in his own quiet way. I've kept in touch with him ever since."

Many of Dolly's early stories revolved around her failed pregnancies and becoming a mother. Dolly's first pregnancy ends in a still birth. She was later given a job working with children at a play group and she became pregnant once more. Writers continued her down luck trend and she has a miscarriage. Rogers was pleased with the story because it portrayed a taboo subject. She explained "It was a good storyline to do, because it was amazing how many women were pleased to see that whole trauma on the screen." It transpired that writers were not keen on seeing Dolly's pregnancy through because of past experiences with the babies who played Sam and Sally Skilbeck. They would often cry together and interrupt filming. Rogers decided to convince them, reminding them that the on-set "mayhem" was bound to have happened with two babies as opposed to one. They agreed and fully developed the story.

On-screen, Dolly gives birth to their first child Samuel Skilbeck (Benjamin Whitehead), who was hired from two weeks old. Rogers' was partly responsible for Whitehead's casting following a chance meeting on public transport. Rogers had a conservation with a viewer, named Mrs Lee. She informed Rogers that her friend Sue Whitehead was pregnant and Rogers suggested that her friend contact the show about casting her baby after the birth. Mrs Lee did not inform her friend and applied on her behalf. When Sue discovered her friends actions she did not mind and one week after the birth of her son they went to the Emmerdale studios. Casting directors were looking for parents who would not be overly protective during filming. Adhering to this requirement, Sue secured the role for her son. Whitehead enjoyed working on the set and never cried even though scenes required it. The production team visited the Whitehead's home to record the crying scenes they required for storylines. Rogers was entrusted by Whitehead's mother to look after him on-set. She watched from monitors to avoid interrupting scenes with her presence. Whitehead eventually called Rogers "mamma" in scenes and they carried on avoiding the earlier disruptions that occurred on-set with the Bell twins. She also praised him for quickly learning to act during location filming as he grew older.

Writers also explored another parental story for Dolly involving an illegitimate child. Richard Roper (David Horovitch) is introduced into the series and it is revealed that he and Dolly had a son together. The baby was born out of marriage and Dolly gave him up for adoption. Writers later introduced Dolly's illegitimate son, Graham Lodsworth played by Ross Kemp.

=== Divorce and departure ===
Writers decided to break-up Dolly and Matt following failed plans for their own home. This began with a "brief encounter" themed storyline featuring Dolly becoming involved with a timber consultant Stephen Fuller (Gregory Floy). Emmerdale writer Michael Russell devised the story over six episodes. Dolly has to decide whether or not she should have an affair. She ultimately remains loyal and sends him away. Floy who played Stephen had asked for more money to continue the storyline but his request angered producers who quickly killed the character off-screen. On-screen Dolly learns of Stephen's death in a fatal car accident via a radio news bulletin. The story was a result of Russell being pressurised to make Emmerdale's stories more racy to compete with the rival soap operas EastEnders and Coronation Street. Rogers recalled that "I think there was pressure to make it slightly tacky, which it wasn't."

Rogers could understand why Dolly ended up in such a predicament. She explained that Dolly had hoped of a home of her own with Matt at Crossgill farm. In addition, she did not want to live with Matt's mother-in-law Annie Sugden (Sheila Mercier). Rogers said that Dolly loved Annie but she wanted to be a housewife without her always around. Then Crossgill is burned down and they have to give up on their dream home. This caused further problems and Matt's relieved attitude further impacts their marriage. Rogers explained that Crossgill burning down suited Matt because he liked living with Annie because "it suited his nature". She further defended Dolly's behaviour and stated that "I don't think [Matt] quite understood that Dolly had more sort of longing, it wasn't that she didn't love him and Sam, Sam was very previous, but she just needed more from life and needed more to be in control really, and then this happened." She added that it was a "terrible tug" for Dolly but was glad that she decided to remain loyal to Matt.

Pyne was unhappy with Dolly's affair storyline. He told Anthony Hayward, author of The Emmerdale Companion that "Dolly had an affair and broke our marriage up, which I really didn't like. I thought it was out of character. And it was sad that one of the few good, happy families in all the different soaps had to split up." Rogers disagreed and claimed that Stephen gave Dolly "the attention she wasn't getting" despite Dolly and Matt previously having a "strong" marriage. She added that Crossgill "represented independence for her". With the loss of Crossgill came the break-down of the Skilbeck's marriage.

In 1991, Rogers left the role. Off-screen executive producer Stuart Doughty had decided axe the character. He was in the process of revamping Emmerdale and had introduced several new characters. Rogers anticipated that Dolly would be written out given that Pyne and other cast members had left. He initially kept the character on but later informed Rogers that she would be leaving. Rogers said that viewers liked Dolly and it was not an easy time but she felt relieved after she left. In the months leading to her departure, writers created a new affair storyline with married counsellor Charlie Aindow (David Fleeshman). They also wrote another pregnancy story for Dolly. This time the issue of abortion was explored much to Rogers' disappointment. She was critical of the storyline and believed that Dolly would never have an abortion because of her miscarriages and still-birth stories. Rogers added "she was very into children. she could have even died when she gave birth to Sam. A woman who has gone through all of that isn't likely to get rid of her baby." Rogers decided to portray the issue as a "tremendous dilemma" to convince viewers that Dolly would have an abortion. She also believed that writers should have introduced a potential illness or life-long condition for the unborn baby to make Dolly's dilemma more believable. Dolly left the series that year and departure story featured her leaving the village to live in Norfolk with Samuel after the conclusion of her affair with Charlie. In 2014, Rogers revealed that she did not want to reprise the role. She explained that "I don't think you should go back. It would never feel the same. I was very fond of Dolly. She was a nice girl—like a sister to me."

== Storylines ==
Dolly arrives from Darlington to serve as a barmaid in The Woolpack. She soon falls for widower Matt Skilbeck and they marry the following year on 29 June 1978, with Dolly receiving a kiss from the local chimney sweep for luck. Dolly falls pregnant in 1980 but miscarries at seven months. She then begins working at the village playgroup. Dolly becomes pregnant again and gives birth to a healthy son, Samuel David Skilbeck who is born on 23 December 1982. Dolly suffers another miscarriage in November 1985, this time at the hands of nasty quarry owner Harry Mowlam, who is later killed following a fight with Matt. Matt is arrested under suspicion as he had a long-standing rivalry with Mowlam and the motive due to him causing Dolly's miscarriage. Dolly stands by her husband and the real killer, Derek Warner is arrested and the Skilbecks soon put the ordeal behind them. Dolly later reveals had become pregnant by Richard in the mid-1960s and gave their son up for adoption. Her illegitimate son, Graham arrives in the village to find her. She lets him stay with her and Matt but Matt and Graham constantly clash. Graham is eventually revealed to be an army deserter on the run from the police. Graham is eventually returned to the army.

Following the death of Mr. Metcalfe (Bernard Kay), Matt inherits Crossgill Farm in his will. Dolly insists they move out of Emmerdale farm but Matt refuses and Dolly accuses him of being boring and lacking ambition. Crosssgill burns down, devastating Dolly but Matt is not too bothered. Dolly has an affair with timber consultant Stephen Fuller which puts strain on the marriage forcing the couple apart. Stephen is killed by a falling tree in November 1988 and Dolly arranges his funeral. Dolly and Matt try to reconcile but after Dolly is kidnapped by Ted Sharp (Andy Rashleigh), Matt proves unsupportive. Matt receives a job in Norfolk and before leaving tells Dolly his loves her and she agrees to let him see Sam at weekends.

Dolly resigns from the pub after Kim Tate (Claire King) offers her a job as a live-in housekeeper. During this time, Dolly has an affair with crooked local councilor, Charlie Aindow but soon ends it but Charlie becomes obsessive and begins hounding her. Eric Pollard (Christopher Chittell) witnesses Charlie harassing Dolly and threatens to tell Charlie's wife, prompting him to back off. Dolly soon discovers she is pregnant but has an abortion. After being used as bait by the Tates to lure a potential client, Dolly decides to leave the village with Samuel after receiving a job and they relocate to be nearer to Matt in Norfolk. Following Annie Sugden's death in 2020, Dolly and Matt help Annie's granddaughter Victoria Sugden (Isabel Hodgins) and Annie's daughter-in-law Diane Sugden (Elizabeth Estensen) organise the funeral in Norfolk.

== Reception ==
Martin Wainwright from The Guardian said that Dolly, Seth Armstrong (Stan Richards) and Amos Brearly (Ronald Magill) were "Stella Gibbons sounding characters". He added that they "lead a life like the Archers' but with added spice—considered essential for the TV audience." Upon viewing Dolly seducing Matt, Geoffrey Phillips from the Evening Standard opined that show's writers were injecting "a few extra hormones into the rump of the rustic serial." Phillips could not easily understand Emmerdale's success but noted it's "little dramas" helped, such as those concerning Matt's murder charge and the Skilbeck divorce. Anthony Hayward, author of The Emmerdale Companion opined that Dolly was one of Emmerdale's "most tragic figures".
