= Amos Brearly =

Fictional character from Emmerdale

- Emmerdale character
- Portrayed by: Ronald Magill
- Duration: 1972–1995
- First appearance: 16 October 1972
- Last appearance: 6 July 1995
- Created by: Kevin Laffan
- Introduced by: David Goddard (1972); Stuart Doughty (1991); Morag Bain (1992); Mervyn Watson (1994)
In-universe information
- Occupation: Publican; Journalist
- Brothers: Ezra Brearly; Luke Brearly
- Wife: Annie Kempinski (1995–2020)
- Uncles: Arthur Brearly; Julian Brearly; Swithin Brearly
- Aunts: Emily Brearly; Amelia Luggett
- First cousins: Martin Brearly

Amos Brearly is a fictional character from the British television soap opera Emmerdale, played by Ronald Magill. He made his first appearance during the serial's debut episode on 16 October 1972. Amos ran The Woolpack pub and was the village gossip. A double act was later formed between Amos and Henry Wilks (Arthur Pentelow), which lasted for 19 years. Amos became known for his bushy sideburns and catchphrase "Nay, Mr Wilks". Magill left the show in January 1991, but reprised the role for several brief appearances until July 1995.

== Creation and development ==
Amos is one of Emmerdale's original characters conceived by creator Kevin Laffan. He was known for his bushy sideburns, which were the result of Magill having rushed to the audition from playing an Edwardian character in a stage play. He thought he would be asked to shave the sideburns if he secured the part, but the producer told him they were ideal for the part and to keep them. At the beginning of the serial, Amos is the landlord of The Woolpack pub. Anthony Hayward described him as having a "dour manner and pernickety ways." Magill saw himself in his character, although he admitted that he was more of "a city slicker". He also said Amos was the village gossip and a loner. This changed with the introduction of Henry Wilks (Arthur Pentelow), who formed a comic double act with Amos for 19 years. Magill explained:

"I saw him as a man who found it difficult to make friends, yet, once he was behind the bar and lord of all he surveyed, he was able to relate to people. But he had the bar between them, of course. Originally, Henry Wilks had nothing to do with the pub, but Kevin Laffan, the creator, spotted a rapport between me and Arthur Pentelow and came up with the idea of moving Henry into the Woolpack. Henry was originally to have been the villain of the piece and Amos was to find a wife and get married. Arthur and I had so much in common. We both loved doing The Times crossword every day – which is a great bond – both smoked a pipe and both liked good food and a bottle of wine."

The introduction of Henry also led to Amos's signature catchphrase "Nay, Mr Wilks". As Amos was tied to The Woolpack, Magill did not do any on-location filming and rarely went outside of the pub set. Laffan eventually gave the character some new hobbies which often took him outside, including gardening and a job as a journalist for the Hotten Courier newspaper. Amos was a bachelor, with Hayward noting "women always seemed a bit of a mystery to the long-time single landlord", but he once proposed to Alison Gibbons (Carolyn Moody) and Annie Sugden (Sheila Mercier) in the same year. Magill left the show in January 1991, saying "I didn't want to pass my Emmerdale sell-by date". His sideburns were shaved off during an appearance on Wogan. On-screen, Amos leaves the village for Spain following a stroke. A reporter for The Daily Telegraph noted that Amos had become one of the longest-serving fictional publicans on British television. Magill later reprised the role for a brief appearance. Amos and Annie eventually marry 20 years after his first proposal in 1995. Magill made his final appearance in July 1995.

== Storylines ==
With his position in The Woolpack pub, Amos was Beckindale's local gossip and was at the centre of all the local news. Amos becomes convinced that the brewery prefers couples to run pubs and proposes to widow Annie Sugden. Annie turns him down gently. Amos goes into business with Henry Wilks and they run the pub together. The Woolpack premises is moved when it is found to be suffering from subsidence. A couple of years later, while closing up, Amos and Mr Wilks are threatened by burglars and are locked in the cellar all night. Amos gives his barmaid Dolly Acaster (Katharine Barker) away when she marries Matt Skilbeck (Frederick Pyne). Gamekeeper Seth Armstrong (Stan Richards) switches from The Malt Shovel to The Woolpack and Seth continuously irritates Amos. Amos gains an allotment and shares a rivalry with Seth for many years.

Amos's aunt Emily Brearly (Ann Way) turns up for a visit and Amos is terrified of her. She flees the Woolpack on discovering that Amos has written-up a report on UFOs spotted locally, stating that he is tampering with unknown forces. A couple of years later, she returns to announce that Amos's uncle Arthur has died. Amos sets up his own short-lived village newsletter – The Beckindale Bugle. Amos befriends NY Estates boss Alan Turner (Richard Thorp). He is distressed to hear Alan criticising him to a golfing pal. From then on, Amos treats Alan frostily, insisting on calling him "Mr Turner". Amos's brother Ezra Brearly (Martin Matthews) makes a few visits to his brother. Amos's rivalry with Ernie Shuttleworth (John Comer) of the Malt Shovel public house takes on a new intensity, as they try to outdo the other with various ventures, including happy hours, juke boxes and dominoes tournaments. Ernie is thrilled to get Amos a ticking off from the local police by tampering with the Woolpack clock so the pub is caught serving drinks after hours. Amos almost marries Gloria Pinfold (Hope Johnston), an old sweetheart of his from many years before. She is a strong-willed woman who moves into the Woolpack and interferes with Henry's bookkeeping and the diet of the two men, insisting that full English breakfasts are not to be eaten because of high cholesterol and fat content. Gloria leaves Amos for another man. Amos discovers a crop circle at Home Farm and is convinced that aliens have landed in Beckindale. By the time Amos takes a local expert to see the spectacle, the field has been harvested.

While celebrating Annie's 70th birthday, Amos suffers a stroke. He decides to retire and hands the pub over to Alan Turner. Amos returns to the village for Henry's funeral, before moving to Spain. He makes further returns for various events, including Annie's wedding to Leonard Kempinski (Bernard Archard), the funeral of the plane crash victims, Alan's wedding to Shirley Foster (Rachel Davies), and Jack Sugden (Clive Hornby) and Sarah Connelly's (Madeleine Howard) wedding, where he announces that the residents of Beckindale have decided to rename the village Emmerdale in honour of Annie. He later returns for the first anniversary of the plane crash. Amos accompanies Annie home for her son Joe Sugden's (Frazer Hines) funeral. Amos remarks that one night while enjoying a drink with Joe in Spain, Joe had asked Amos to make sure that if anything was to happen to him that there would be a few free drinks given in The Woolpack after the funeral. Amos thought that this request was strange considering that Joe was more likely to outlive him, hinting that Joe's death may not have been an accident. Following the funeral, Annie proposes to Amos, who tells her that he will have to think about it. Annie, feeling embarrassed, tells him to forget about it. After Amos discusses it with Alan, he proposes to Annie and she accepts. Sarah then waves them off as they leave Emmerdale Farm, returning to their home in Spain, where he and Annie marry.

== Reception ==
A Daily Telegraph writer said Magill's "grumpy pub landlord" was one of the best-loved characters in Emmerdale, who ruled The Woolpack with "a benign Yorkshire gruffness." Of Magill's performance, they wrote "While easily caricatured, Magill's portrayal of Amos was remarkably subtle, containing elements of real sadness and pathos." In a 2021 Radio Times poll, Amos and Henry were voted as the joint tenth "best soap pub landlord of all time", receiving 3% of the votes. Amos was named as one of "the 30 greatest Emmerdale residents" by a writer for Inside Soap. They branded him "cantankerous" Amos who was "better known for his enormous sideburns than for his pint-pulling skills." The writer also assessed that Amos and Henry formed an "unforgettable double act", adding they were "often likened to an old married couple due to their bickering."
