= Henry Wilks =

Fictional character from Emmerdale

- Emmerdale character
- Portrayed by: Arthur Pentelow
- Duration: 1972–1991
- First appearance: 16 October 1972
- Last appearance: 29 August 1991
- Created by: Kevin Laffan
- Introduced by: David Goddard
In-universe information
- Occupation: Pub landlord Businessperson
- Wife: Margaret Wilks (backstory)
- Daughters: Marian Rosetti
- Grandsons: Nicolo Rosetti
- First cousins: Alice Wilks

Henry Wilks is a fictional character from the British television soap opera Emmerdale, played by Arthur Pentelow. He ran the Woolpack public house alongside Amos Brearly (Ronald Magill) for nearly 20 years.

== Creation and casting ==
Henry is one of the eight original main characters conceived by the creator of Emmerdale, Kevin Laffan. The serial centred around the Sugdens, a farming family who owned Emmerdale Farm on the outskirts of Beckindale village. Laffan explained that he was interested by the notion that farming was "a way of life" and not just a way to earn a living, as well as "the mental attitude" that set them apart. This is why he introduced Henry, "an industrialist from the outside world" who comes into the farming community. After the show's story was mapped out, Laffan joined casting director Sue Whatmough, producer David Goddard, and director Tristan de Vere Cole for the casting process and interviews were carried out in May 1972 at Yorkshire Television's London offices. Laffan recalled that they wanted to cast actors that would gel well together, and Arthur Pentelow was "an immediate choice" for the role of Henry. Gail Harrison was cast as Henry's daughter Marian Wilks. Henry was introduced in the show's debut episode, broadcast on 16 October 1972.

== Development ==
Henry's original character outline appeared in Anthony Hayward's book The Emmerdale Companion: "Henry Wilks is a widower used to having his own way. A retired factory owner, he has always given the orders carried out by others. Now, however, he must adjust his personal relationships, as he discovers on his first contact with the Sugdens." Henry is characterised as "blunt" and "honest", yet despite these personality traits he is also very "kind-hearted". Characters that talk nonsense can expect to witness Henry's "blunt" mannerisms. He also has a keen interest in the environment and wants to preserve the natural surroundings of the Yorkshire Dales. Henry is retired wool merchant from Bradford. He moves to Beckindale after the death of his wife. Henry's first meeting with the Sugden family is "acrimonious", as he discovers an unused right-of-way across their land and insists on using it. He later becomes a shareholder at the local Emmerdale Farm. Henry is an old friend of Annie Sugden (Sheila Mercier) and he helps create a business plan to save the farm. He convinces the Sugden family to turn the farm into a limited company and joins the board of directors. In another story, Henry proposes marriage to Annie. Mercier told a reporter from TVTimes that Annie declined his offer because she thought it would ruin their good friendship. Aside from Annie, the only other woman that Henry cares for is his daughter. Marian was the first member of the original cast to leave the show in 1973. She moves to Italy, where she marries and gives birth to Henry's first grandchild, Niccolo. When Marian reveals her marriage is in trouble, Henry comes close to leaving the village to set up home with her and his grandson.

Writers created an on-screen partnership between Henry and Amos Brearly (Ronald Magill). When Henry's house is destroyed by a fire, he moves into the Woolpack pub and remains there permanently. Henry and Amos decide to create a business partnership and take joint ownership of the pub. Linda Hawkins, author of Emmerdale Farm: Celebration Edition 1000 Episodes stated that Henry and Amos are often "squabble amicably" but they are "close friends and enjoy each other's company." Amos believes that Henry constantly holds him back from money making schemes and "they constantly argue". Hawkins added that "underneath, Amos is devoted to Henry." Anthony Hayward, author of The Who's Who of Soap Operas noted that there was "constant sparring" between the two but it always remained "friendly". Hilary Kingsley, author of Soap Box, believed Henry was "the perfect foil" for the temperamental Amos. Of Amos and Henry's living situation, Pentelow explained: I'm not a pub person at all and Ronnie (Amos) and I often laugh about the dingy living quarters we're supposed to share. We fantasise about a lovely lounge upstairs and luxurious bedrooms. We do have separate bedrooms, by the way, despite what people say." Amos and Henry's partnership lasted seventeen years until Amos decides to retire, after suffering a stroke and a fall down some stairs. Hayward assessed that Henry was an "emotional wrench" and "exasperated" that Amos would give up on their business. Henry views Amos' decision as a selfish act but their parting is amicable because Henry is "genuinely fond of Amos". Writers decided to introduce Alan Turner (Richard Thorp) as the new landlord of the Woolpack. Henry and Alan had many disagreements and Henry decides to move out of the Woolpack and onto lodgings at Emmerdale Farm.

Pentelow died suddenly of a heart attack on 6 August 1991. Producers initially considered sending Henry to visit Marian in Italy or die while he was on holiday, but instead he suffered a fatal heart attack at the harvest festival off-screen. Script editor Ann Tobin explained "It was a rite of passage and we wanted to allow viewers to mourn by relating the plot to real life." As the show was filmed a few months ahead of broadcast, Henry's death did not occur within the serial until October 1991.

== Reception ==
Hilary Kingsley, author of Soap Box opined that the character was "beautifully underplayed" by Pentelow. She also called Henry "the wise elder statesman of Beckindale." Like Magill, Pentelow was often stopped in the streets by fans. He recalled that his favourite interaction was with an old man, who told him that he had given him "an hour or two of real pleasure." A reporter for the Evening Standard stated Pentelow played "the bluff, wise Mr Wilks whose verbal duels with Amos Brearly were some of the most magic moments in the soap for its millions of fans." Jon Kelly of the Daily Mirror branded Henry "the resident tycoon of the Dales" and said he was "one of Emmerdale's best-known characters." Reflecting on the first few episodes of Emmerdale in 2012, Kelly's colleague Lewis Panther described Henry as a "bully boy businessman".

Anthony Hayward, author of The Who's Who of Soap Operas branded Henry a "reflective, pipe-smoking" businessman. Writing for The Independent, Hayward said that Henry and Amos had a double-act that lasted almost twenty years with "plenty of comic moments". In a 2021 Radio Times poll, Amos and Henry were voted as the joint tenth "best soap pub landlord of all time", receiving 3% of the votes. Henry was named as one of "the 30 greatest Emmerdale residents" by a writer for Inside Soap. They assessed that "gentlemanly Henry made an unforgettable double act" with Amos, adding "often likened to an old married couple due to their bickering."
