= Edward Peel =

British actor

- Born: Edward R. Peel; Bradford, Yorkshire, England
- Education: Rose Bruford College
- Occupation: Actor

Edward Peel is an English television and stage actor. He was described by The Times in 2010 as a "veteran star of TV dramas" and "a familiar face on television for the past 40 years".

== Early life and education ==
Growing up in Bolton Villas, Peel was educated at Swainhouse Primary School followed by Belle Vue Grammar School. Initially, he began his career working as a primary school teacher for a year before spending a summer working as a gravedigger. Deciding to become an actor, he joined the Bradford Civic Theatre before going to train at Rose Bruford College, catching the eye of Esme Church, having missed that opportunity in his hometown some years earlier.

== Career ==
Peel's television roles include Lennie in The Sweeney episode "Bait" with George Sewell (1978), Pieterzoon in Shogun (1980) and Ted Turton in the Minder episode "Broken Arrow" (1982). He played police officers in ongoing episodes of both Juliet Bravo (1983–1985) and Cracker (1993–1995) and played two different roles in Emmerdale Farm (Tom Merrick: 1981–1982, Tony Cairns: 1997–1998). He played Kane, the main villain in the Doctor Who serial Dragonfire (1987). He also appeared as different characters in two episodes of Heartbeat, playing the part of a bank manager in the first series and later appearing as Clifford Chappell in episode 17 of series 15 entitled "Get Back". Peel also appeared in two episodes of the original series of All Creatures Great and Small, "Fair Means and Foul" and "Barks and Bites".

From 2000 to 2001, Peel appeared regularly in the prime-time ITV drama series London's Burning as John Coleman. In May 2020, he appeared in an episode of the BBC soap opera Doctors as Eddie Morgan.

Peel has acted in the films O Lucky Man! (1973), Force 10 from Navarone (1978), Britannia Hospital (1982) and Lassiter (1984).

On stage, Peel has performed at Shakespeare's Globe in A Midsummer Night's Dream, Anne Boleyn, Troilus and Cressida and The Winter's Tale.

Peel also appeared in commercials for the insurance company Direct Line.

== Personal life ==
His son is scriptwriter Benjamin Peel.
