= Andrew Burt =

British actor (1945–2018)

- Born: Andrew Thomas Hutchison Burt; 23 May 1945; Wakefield, West Riding of Yorkshire, England
- Died: 16 November 2018 (aged 73)
- Occupations: Actor, voice artist and counsellor
- Years active: 1972–2009

Andrew Thomas Hutchison Burt (23 May 1945 – 16 November 2018) was a British actor, voiceover artist, and counsellor.

== Early life and education ==
Andrew Burt was born on 23 May 1945 in Wakefield, West Riding of Yorkshire, England, to Hutchison Burt, a psychiatrist, lecturer and Medical Superintendent at Stanley Royd Hospital, Wakefield, and Aileen, a teacher. When Andrew was 8 years old his father died, leaving behind also an older brother, Ian. Burt was educated at Silcoates School in Wakefield. From 1963 to 1965 he performed with Oldbury Rep. He attended Rose Bruford College of Speech and Drama until 1968, and left with a bachelor's degree in English, validated by the University of Kent.

== Filmography ==
=== Selected Film and TV ===
- Emmerdale Farm (1972–73, 1976) – Jack Sugden
- Warship (1976–77) – Lieutenant Peek
- The Black Panther (1977) – Ronald Whittle
- The Voyage of Charles Darwin (1978) – Robert Fitzroy
- The Legend of King Arthur (1979) – King Arthur
- Blake's 7 (1980) – Venn Jarvik
- Closing Ranks (1980) – David Maitland
- Gulliver in Lilliput (1981) – Gulliver
- Doctor Who – Terminus (1983) – Valguard
- Miss Marple episode "4:50 from Paddington" (1987) – Dr John Quimper
- Campion (TV series) (1989) – Inspector Oates
- Agatha Christie's Poirot episode The Affair at the Victory Ball (1991) – James Ackerley

=== TV series ===
Burt appeared in many TV series and soaps, including; Angels, Bergerac, The Bill, Callan, Casualty, Crown Court, Dixon of Dock Green, EastEnders, Heartbeat, Howards' Way, Juliet Bravo, New Tricks, Rock Follies of '77, Rumpole of the Bailey, Spooks, and Tales of the Unexpected.

=== Comedy work ===
- I'm Alan Partridge,(1997–2002) – Announcer of Radio Norwich
- I'm Alan Partridge (2002) – Frank Raphael
- Harry Enfield's Television Programme (1992) – The Judge
- Look Around You (Sport) (2005) – Provastian/Ninastian
- The Day Today (1994) – Martin Craste

=== Children's TV ===
- Stepping Stones (1978–1980) – Co-Presenter
- Swallows and Amazons Forever! (1983) – Frank Farland
- Jackanory (1983) The Lightkeepers – Narrator
- Jackanory (1983) The Dangerous Journey – Narrator
- Super Gran (1985) – Desperate Desmond

=== Radio Plays ===
Burt was the first actor to play the character of Inspector Morse, starring in Last Bus to Woodstock, in June 1985, on BBC Radio 4.

He appeared regularly in numerous BBC radio plays, including Saturday Night Theatre, The Monday Play, The Afternoon Play, Afternoon Theatre, The Classic Serial, and A Book at Bedtime.

=== Voice-overs and narration ===
Burt was a voice-over artist, and provided voice-overs for numerous TV and radio commercials, documentaries and talking books, spanning five decades.

He narrated books for the blind as a volunteer for the Calibre Audio Library.

For over a decade, Burt was the announcer for ITN's ITV News programmes, including News at Ten.

== Counselling career ==
In later years, Burt trained in counselling at the Metanoia Institute in Ealing, after which, as an accredited member of the BACP, he worked as a humanistic counsellor at his own practice, ABC Andrew Burt Counselling.

== Personal life ==
Burt had a passion for art and a personal interest in collecting paintings and sculpture. His specific passion was the work of English artist Michael Ayrton.

He was a patron of Oldbury Rep, the theatre company where he began his acting career.

Burt had a continued friendship with Sheila Mercier, his on-screen mother in Emmerdale Farm, which lasted until his death.

== Death ==
Andrew Burt died of lung cancer on 16 November 2018, aged 73.
