= Jo Kendall =

British actress (1940–2022)

- Born: Josephine Mary Robinson; 17 February 1940; Cleethorpes, Lincolnshire, England
- Died: 29 January 2022 (aged 81); Northwood, London, England
- Education: Royal Central School of Speech and Drama
- Occupations: Actress; writer
- Years active: 1962–1999

Josephine Mary Robinson, better known by her stage name Jo Kendall (17 February 1940 – 29 January 2022) was a British actress and writer. She was known for her work on the BBC radio comedy show I'm Sorry, I'll Read That Again, which debuted in 1964, and for her role as Peggy Skilbeck on the ITV soap opera Emmerdale (then Emmerdale Farm) from 1972 to 1973, in which she also spoke the programme's first line of dialogue in the inaugural episode.

== Early life ==
Kendall was born Josephine Mary Robinson in Cleethorpes, Lincolnshire, on 17 February 1940. After leaving Leicester she trained at the Central School of Speech and Drama and gained her Licentiate of the Royal Academy of Music (LRAM).

== Career ==
While teaching English and drama at a state secondary school for girls at Cambridge, she acted with the university's dramatic society's productions with roles ranging from Desdemona in Othello at the ADC Theatre in 1962 to Maisie King in Expresso Bongo. She also trained as a studio manager with the BBC.

In August 1963, she appeared in the West End in London, New Zealand and Broadway, in the Cambridge University revue Cambridge Circus directed by Humphrey Barclay, alongside Graham Chapman, John Cleese, Bill Oddie, Tim Brooke-Taylor, David Hatch and Chris Stuart-Clark. She was already known to the cast from her experience with the Footlights' productions and had even been on a date with Chapman – "Should I bring a book with me this time?", she quipped when he asked her for another. Her audition included an impromptu rendition of "My Funny Valentine". She could not remember the lyrics but Barclay accepted her readily, "... a witty and clever performer. There was no competition, we all very gladly and warmly welcomed her into the cast."

In radio comedy, she was a regular performer in the BBC's I'm Sorry, I'll Read That Again (with John Cleese, Tim Brooke-Taylor, Bill Oddie, Graeme Garden and David Hatch). She then appeared in the first episode of the spinoff panel game I'm Sorry I Haven't A Clue in 1972, teamed with Garden against Brooke-Taylor and Oddie. From 1976, she was in the radio comedy series The Burkiss Way and played Lady Cynthia Fitzmelton in the opening episode of The Hitchhiker's Guide to the Galaxy in 1978. The character never appeared again after the first episode and was omitted completely from subsequent remakes.

In 1978, she appeared in the comedy drama The Unvarnished Truth at London's Phoenix Theatre with Royce Ryton, Tim Brooke-Taylor and Graeme Garden. In 1993 and 1994 she played Aunt Maud opposite Kate Copstick in the BBC children's series Marlene Marlowe Investigates.

Kendall appeared in straight drama. She appeared as Adelaide Palliser in The Pallisers (1974), as the matron Miss Biggs in the film version of Scum (1979), as Annie in the film adaptation of Howards End (1992), directed by James Ivory, and as a publican's wife in another Merchant Ivory film The Remains of the Day in 1993. She played Peggy Skilbeck in the ITV series Emmerdale Farm and spoke the first ever line of the programme. Among her television roles, she played Mrs Bardell in The Pickwick Papers (1985), Anne Stanhope in The Six Wives of Henry VIII and had a semi-regular part in Grange Hill in the 1980s as the mother of regular character Roland Browning. In addition, she played the abrasive Miss Elizabeth Wait in the BBC's adaptation of the Vivien Alcock book The Cuckoo Sister (1986).

== Personal life ==
Kendall never married. She retired in 1999, though she made occasional appearances as late as 2017, when she took part in a stage tour of I'm Sorry, I'll Read That Again. As of 2007, she lived in a cottage near Bury St Edmunds, but towards the end of her life she resided at Denville Hall, a retirement home for actors in London, where she died on 29 January 2022 at the age of 81.

== Filmography ==
Year	Title	Role	Notes
1972–1973	Emmerdale Farm	Peggy Skilbeck	46 episodes
1979	Scum	Matron	
1992	Howards End	Annie	
1993	The Remains of the Day	Publican's Wife	
1999	Bridge of Dragons	Lily (The Maid)	(final film role)
