= Sam Pearson (Emmerdale) =

Fictional character from Emmerdale

- Emmerdale character
- Portrayed by: Toke Townley
- Duration: 1972–1984
- First appearance: 16 October 1972
- Last appearance: 22 November 1984
- Created by: Kevin Laffan
- Introduced by: David Goddard
In-universe information
- Sisters: Rosemary Kendall
- Wife: Grace Armitage (backstory)
- Daughters: Annie Sugden
- Grandsons: Jack Sugden; Joe Sugden
- Granddaughters: Peggy Skilbeck
- Grandfathers: Samuel Woodley
- Nephews: Arthur Kendall
- Other relatives: Jackie Merrick; Sam Skilbeck; Sally Skilbeck; Sharon Crossthwaite

Sam Pearson is a fictional character from the British soap opera Emmerdale Farm, played by Toke Townley. Sam is one of the show's original characters; he appeared for twelve years from the first episode in 1972, until Townley's death in September 1984.

== Development ==
Toke Townley was cast as Sam in 1972 and he was one of the original characters on Emmerdale Farm. Sam was often referred to as "grandad" by other characters in the show. Townley was the soap's eldest cast member and his on-set persona was described as unique. Townley would often lose his scripts and call sheets, though his fellow cast members did not mind as he would always perform well during filming. Emmerdale Farm producer Richard Handford said that Townley "was such a marvellous character and on the day, he could deliver a performance that was magical."

Off-screen, Townley had ill-health related to his heart and kept it a secret from production. While out shopping, Townley collapsed and was taken into hospital. Handford visited Townley in hospital and believed he would recover. However, Townley died in his sleep that evening and writers were left with the dilemma of how to write Sam out of the series. Writers decided to kill the character off in a similar way. After Sam's death, a picture of him was placed on the mantlepiece of the Sugden home. Handford stated: "he was very good company and a true professional. There was no question of finding another actor to play Sam Pearson. Toke Townley was irreplaceable."

== Storylines ==
Sam attended his son-in-law's funeral with the rest of the family on 16 October 1972. In 1973, he asked to be confirmed by the church after suffering a bout of ill health, thinking he was going to die soon. However, this was just a scare and he soon got better and was involved in a fracas with old wartime friend, Charlie Nelson, in late 1973.

In 1975, he was annoyed to find that Annie had been in contact with his niece, Jean Kendall, in Middlesbrough. Sam had disowned the family after his sister Rosemary was ill-treated by her husband Arthur Kendall. In March, Jean's 16-year-old daughter, Rosemary Kendall, turned up and Sam agreed to let her stay. The same year, he was disappointed to find he would not become the new churchwarden after Wally Lumm died.

In 1983, Sam Pearson was grumbling because grandson Joe was seeing a married woman, Barbara Peters. In November 1984, Sam won first prize at the Village Annual Pumpkin Show. He died peacefully in his sleep that night and daughter Annie found him dead in his bed when she took him his morning cup of tea. His funeral took place a few days later. Annie found that Sam had told Reverend Donald Hinton (Hugh Manning) that he had not much time left and not to tell Annie until after he had died.
