= Ronald Magill =

English actor

- Born: 21 April 1920; Hull, England
- Died: 6 September 2007 (aged 87); London, England
- Occupation: Actor
- Years active: 1961-1995
- Partner: David Soar (1965–1997; Soar's death)

Ronald Edmund Magill (21 April 1920 – 6 September 2007) was an English actor. He is best remembered for playing Amos Brearly in the British soap opera Emmerdale from the first episode in 1972 to 1991, and appeared again in this role in 1994 and 1995.

== Early life ==
Magill was born in 1920 in Hull, East Riding of Yorkshire. the child of two teachers. His father died when he was aged nine, and he then grew up in an orphanage in Birmingham, visiting his mother in Ireland during the holidays. After leaving school he became a tyre salesman. During the Second World War, Magill served in the Royal Corps of Signals and was a member of "Stars in Battledress". In Egypt he helped build a theatre where the company staged plays.

== Stage career ==
Following the war, Magill worked with the Arena Theatre Company and rep. In 1961, he spent a year at the Belgrade Theatre in Coventry. In 1963, he acted at the Playhouse, Nottingham, where he was later made artistic director and remained there until 1968. Magill directed many productions, and also wrote plays and translated others into English. He starred in the West End production of The Ruling Class and appeared at the Bristol Old Vic in Death of a Salesman and The Browning Version. His first television appearances were in 1969, in the programmes Special Branch and Parkin's Patch, and the following year appeared in the film Julius Caesar.

== Emmerdale Farm ==
Ronald Magill joined the cast of Emmerdale Farm when the soap opera launched on 16 October 1972. He played Amos Brearly, a character who co-ran The Woolpack pub with Henry Wilks, and they became a double act for the next nineteen years. The bushy sideburns for which he became known were the result of having come to the audition from playing an Edwardian in a stage play; he was told they were perfect for the part. After his departure from Emmerdale, as it is now titled, in January 1991, Magill had his sideburns shaved off on Wogan. He reappeared as Amos for short-lived appearances in 1992, 1993, 1994 and 1995, the latter when the character accompanied Annie Sugden to her son Joe's funeral. The two characters later married off-screen in Spain. His final appearance was on 6 July 1995.

== Later years ==
After landing the part of Amos, he rarely appeared on the stage. Magill's partner of 32 years, David Soar, died in 1997. Ten years later in 2007, Magill died aged 87.

Magill had been suffering from Bell's palsy in the years leading up to his death.

== Filmography ==
Year	Title	Role	Notes
1970	Julius Caesar	Servant to Caesar #2	
