= Arthur Pentelow =

British actor (1924-1991)

- Born: Arthur William Pentelow; 14 February 1924; Rochdale, Lancashire, England
- Died: 6 August 1991 (aged 67); Birmingham, England
- Occupation: Actor
- Years active: 1963–1991
- Spouse: Jacqueline Pentelow
- Children: 2

Arthur William Pentelow (14 February 1924 – 6 August 1991) was an English actor who was best known for playing Henry Wilks in Emmerdale Farm, appearing from the first episode in 1972 until 1991.

== Early career ==
Born in Rochdale, Lancashire, Pentelow's love of drama began while he was studying Shakespeare at grammar school, but he started his working life as a cadet clerk in the local police force. He later served in World War II in the Royal Navy and did radar work in Normandy. After peace was declared, Pentelow returned to Rochdale, where he became a student teacher. He started acting as an amateur with the Curtain Theatre Company, before becoming a member of the Bradford Civic Playhouse Theatre School. Between his theatre work he sold ice-cream and delivered laundry. He later went on to work in repertory theatre at the Bristol Old Vic, Guildford and Northampton, before joining the company at Birmingham, where his fellow actors included Derek Jacobi, Rosemary Leach and Albert Finney.

== Film and television career ==
Pentelow appeared in a number of films during his career, these included, Charlie Bubbles, Privilege, and The Peace Game. He also made appearances in popular television programmes, such as, Z-Cars, The Troubleshooters, Emergency Ward 10 and Hadleigh.

Prior to appearing in the soap opera Emmerdale Farm when it began in 1972, he had already appeared in Coronation Street as an old friend of Hilda Ogden, played by the actress Jean Alexander, as well as a sporting serial called United! as the football supporters' club chairman. Pentelow also appeared in 1969's notorious gangland series for Granada "Big Breadwinner Hog" as the unflappable Detective Inspector Walker, one of the CID team on the trail of the trendy, up-and-coming gangland boss Hogarth of the title.

The character of Henry Wilks in Emmerdale Farm was a retired Bradford wool merchant who became a director of Emmerdale Farm when it became a limited company. He also became a joint-owner of the village public house, the Woolpack. After Pentelow's unexpected death, the programme had Wilks die off-screen; due to the advanced schedule of production this was not aired until October 1991.

== Personal life ==
Pentelow was married to Jacqueline, whom he had met when they were both studying acting. They had two sons - Nicholas and Simon. Their son Nick was one of the saxophone players for glam-rock band Wizzard.

== Death ==
Pentelow died from a heart attack in 1991, at the age of 67, whilst driving from his family home in Birmingham to commence filming Emmerdale in Bradford and Leeds. He died in the ambulance on the way to hospital.

== Filmography ==
| Year | Title | Role | Notes |
|---|---|---|---|
| 1965 | Compact | Langley | 3 episodes |
| 1965 | Gideon's Way | 'The Prowler' Mr Lewis | |
| 1965 | The Man in Room 17 | Dr. Probyn | 1 episode |
| 1967 | Privilege | Leo Stanley | |
| 1967 | The Newcomers | Morton-Hyde | 3 episodes |
| 1968 | Charlie Bubbles | Man With Car | |
| 1969 | The Gladiators | British General | |
| 1971 | Bel Ami | Tattle | 4 episodes |
