= Frederick Pyne =

English actor

- Born: 30 December 1936 (age 89); London, England, UK
- Occupation: Actor
- Years active: 1966–present
- Known for: Playing Matt Skilbeck in Emmerdale (1972–1989)

Frederick Pyne (born 30 December 1936) is an English actor best known for his role as original character Matt Skilbeck on the ITV soap Emmerdale Farm from 1972 to 1989.

Pyne attended Holloway County Grammar School (now Holloway School). He worked as a farmer before serving in the Royal Air Force, and then went to RADA for training as an actor. From 1966 to 1970, he worked on stage productions at the National Theatre at the Old Vic.

Pyne's other television appearances include Crossroads, Dixon of Dock Green, An Affair of Honour, The Three Princes, Talking to a Stranger and R3.

Pyne served on the Equity Council for many years and was the organization's president from 1994 until 2002. He is a trustee of five charities connected to the acting profession.
