= Sheila Mercier =

English actress (1919–2019)

- Born: Sheila Betty Rix; 1 January 1919; Kingston upon Hull, East Riding of Yorkshire, England
- Died: 4 December 2019 (aged 100); Kent, England
- Occupation: Actress
- Years active: 1936–2000; 2009
- Known for: Annie Sugden in Emmerdale (1972–1996, 2009)
- Spouse: Peter Mercier (m. 1951; died 1993)
- Children: 2
- Relatives: Brian Rix (brother); Elspet Gray (sister-in-law); Louisa Rix (niece); Jamie Rix (nephew)

Sheila Betty Mercier (née Rix; 1 January 1919 – 4 December 2019) was an English actress, of stage and television, best known for playing Annie Sugden in the soap opera Emmerdale for over 20 years, from the programme's first episode in 1972 until 1994, with a guest return in 2009.

== Early life and education ==
Mercier was born in Hull, East Riding of Yorkshire, England, the daughter of Herbert Rix (of J.R. Rix & Sons Ltd) and his wife Fanny. She was their third child and second daughter; her younger brother was the actor and campaigner Brian Rix. After education at the French Convent (Hull) and at Hunmanby Hall (both East Riding of Yorkshire), she trained for the stage at the Stratford-upon-Avon College of Drama under Randle Ayrton.

== Career ==
Mercier had a long career on stage before her television career. Donald Wolfit had talent spotted her and she toured with Wolfit's own Shakespeare company in 1939. During the Second World War, she joined the Women's Auxiliary Air Force (WAAF) division of the Royal Air Force. She served in RAF Fighter Command, and rose to become an adjutant. After the war, she worked in repertory theatre until 1951, receiving positive reviews from critics. One review said of her performance in The Enchanted Cottage in 1948, "Sheila Rix is outstanding as the witch-like housekeeper." In Noël Coward's Hay Fever at the Tonbridge Repertory Theatre the same year, a review said, "Sheila Rix superbly portrays the ex-actress, extremely emotional mother of the family." About Cocteau's The Eagle with Two Heads, another review said, "The number of repertory companies who have dealt with this striking play has been very small. Notable in the cast was Sheila Rix as the tragic Queen, who held her audience throughout."

From 1951 until 1972, she worked with her brother Brian Rix in the Whitehall farces, both at the Whitehall Theatre itself, on tour to regional theatres, and in televised performances on BBC Television. Critics commented, "Sheila Mercier ..[is] up to the second in tempo and sense of fun;" "In Chase Me, Comrade!, Jacqueline Ellis and Helen Jesson as well as Sheila Mercier, all contribute mightily to the fun with excellent work;" and "Sheila Mercier is refreshingly sane as the commander's wife." She also appeared in the television series Dial RIX (1963) alongside her husband, Peter Mercier.

In 1972, she was cast in the role she is best known for, the matriarch Annie Sugden, one of the principal characters in the new British soap opera Emmerdale Farm (later simply Emmerdale). She appeared as a main cast member until 1994 with rare occasional appearances later including the funeral for on-screen son Joe in June 1995, along with screen husband Amos Brearly. In 1979, Hazel Holt in The Stage wrote: "I never cease to admire the sheer consistency of Sheila Mercier's performance as Annie Sugden in Yorkshire's Emmerdale Farm. ... Every Tuesday and Friday, week in and week out she is never less than convincing." Mercier later reprised her role several times following the character's 1994 retirement.

== Personal life and death ==
In 1951, Mercier married actor Peter Mercier. They were married for 42 years until his death in 1993. The couple's son, Nigel Mercier (6 December 1954 – 6 January 2017), also worked in the TV industry, initially with BBC Television News at Television Centre as a videotape editor and then at LWT.

In 1994 Mercier's autobiography, Annie's Song: My Life & Emmerdale, written with Anthony Hayward, was published. In it, she disclosed that she had been raped by an officer early in the Second World War, had become pregnant and given her baby daughter up for adoption. She had been contacted by her daughter thirty years later. The two women became close friends.

She died on 4 December 2019.

== Filmography ==
=== Selected stage performances ===
| Year | Title | Author | Theatre | Role | Company |
|---|---|---|---|---|---|
| 1939 | A Murder Has Been Arranged | Emlyn Williams | Palace, Hull | Mrs Arthur | Carl Bernard |
| 1940 | London Wall | John Van Druten | | | New Theatre |
| 1947 | The Man Who Came to Dinner | George S. Kaufman and Moss Hart | Royal Court, Warrington | | Philip Stainton Players |
| 1948 | Is Your Honeymoon Really Necessary? | E. Vivian Tidmarsh | Tonbridge Repertory Theatre | | Robert Marshall Company |
| 1948 | Tons of Money | Will Evans and Arthur Valentine | Tonbridge Repertory Theatre | Louise Allington | Robert Marshall Company |
| 1948 | The Cat and the Canary | John Willard | Tonbridge Repertory Theatre | Mammy Pleasant | Robert Marshall Company |
| 1948 | The Enchanted Cottage | Arthur Wing Pinero | Tonbridge Repertory Theatre | Housekeeper | Robert Marshall Company |
| 1948 | Hay Fever | Noël Coward | Tonbridge Repertory Theatre | Judith Bliss | Robert Marshall Company |
| 1948 | The Eagle with Two Heads | Jean Cocteau | | The Queen | Ilkley Repertory Company |
| 1949 | Jupiter Laughs | A. J. Cronin | Margate Hippodrome | | Viking Theatre Company |
| 1949 | Love In Idleness | Terence Rattigan | Margate Hippodrome | Olivia Brown | Viking Theatre Company |
| 1949 | An Inspector Calls | J. B. Priestley | Margate Hippodrome | | Viking Theatre Company |
| 1949 | The Importance of Being Earnest | Oscar Wilde | Margate Hippodrome | Lady Bracknell | Viking Theatre Company |
| 1949 | Room For Two | Gilbert Wakefield | Margate Hippodrome | Clare Broden | Viking Theatre Company |
| 1949 | Rookery Nook | Ben Travers | Margate Hippodrome | Mrs Leverett | Viking Theatre Company |
| 1949 | Sweet Aloes | Jay Mallory | Margate Hippodrome | | Viking Theatre Company |
| 1950 | Rope | Patrick Hamilton | Bridlington Spa | | Viking Theatre Company |
| 1951 | Castle in the Air | | Margate Hippodrome | "Boss" Trent | Viking Theatre Company |

=== Selected Whitehall farces ===
| Year | Title | Author | Theatre/TV | Role |
|---|---|---|---|---|
| 1951 | Which Witch? | John Trayne and Rosamund Beauchamp | Miniature Theatre, Sidcup | Wife |
| 1958 | On Monday Next | Philip King | BBC TV | Sandra Layton |
| 1958 | A Cuckoo in the Nest | Ben Travers | BBC TV | |
| 1961–1962 | One for the Pot | Ray Cooney and Tony Hilton | Whitehall Theatre, BBC TV | Amy Hardcastle |
| 1961 | Basinful of Briny | Leslie Sands | BBC TV | |
| 1963 | Love's a Luxury | Guy Paxton and Edward V. Hoile | BBC TV | |
| 1964 | One Wild Oat | Vernon Sylvaine | BBC TV | |
| 1964–1966 | Chase Me Comrade! | Ray Cooney | Coventry Theatre, Whitehall Theatre, Morecambe Winter Gardens; Manchester Opera House; Royal Court Theatre, Liverpool; King's Theatre, Glasgow; King's Theatre, Edinburgh | Mrs Janet Rimmington |
| 1964–1967 | Bang Bang Beirut / Stand By Your Bedouin | Ray Cooney and Tony Hilton | Yvonne Arnaud Theatre, Guildford; Manchester Opera House; Royal Court Theatre, Liverpool; King's Theatre, Glasgow; King's Theatre, Edinburgh; Garrick Theatre, London | Eloise |
| 1967 | Uproar in the House | Anthony Marriott and Alistair Foot | Garrick Theatre, London; Whitehall Theatre | Audrey Grey |
| 1968 | A Public Mischief | Kenneth Horne | BBC TV | |
| 1969 | The Facts of Life | | Garrick Theatre, London; BBC TV | |
| 1971 | Will Any Gentleman? | Vernon Sylvaine | Cardiff New Theatre, BBC TV | Mrs. Whittle |
| 1971 | One Wild Oat | Vernon Sylvaine | Cardiff New Theatre, BBC TV | Lydia Gilbey |

=== Selected filmography ===
| Year | Title | Role |
|---|---|---|
| 1972–1996, 2009 | Emmerdale | Annie Sugden (1597 episodes) |
| 1972 | Six With Rix | Various roles |
| 1960–1970 | Brian Rix Presents | Various roles in Whitehall farces, as above |
