= Kevin Laffan =

British writer (1922–2003)

- Born: Kevin Barry Laffan; 24 May 1922; Reading, Berkshire, England
- Died: 11 March 2003 (aged 80); London, England
- Occupations: Screenwriter, playwright
- Spouse: Jeanne Thompson (m. 1952)
- Children: 3
- Writing career
- Notable work: Emmerdale

Kevin Barry Laffan (24 May 1922 – 11 March 2003) was a British playwright, screenwriter, author, actor and stage director. Laffan is best known for creating the 1972 ITV soap opera Emmerdale Farm, titled Emmerdale since 1989.

Raised in a family of fourteen children, Laffan's Catholic upbringing formed the inspiration for many of his plays. Laffan's theatrical career began with a position as a call boy at the Theatre Royal in Bilston, and would eventually lead to him founding a repertory company in Reading. In later life, Laffan also branched out into fiction, publishing his début novel, Virgins are in Short Supply, in 2001.

== Early life and theatre career ==
Laffan was the third of fourteen children of a disabled Irish photographer. The family moved to Walsall while he was a child. When he was twelve, they were sent to the workhouse and he claimed to have escaped by jumping off the lorry as it drove through the gates. An elderly actress allowed him to sleep in her kitchen and advised him, "If you want to be serious, make them laugh". At 14 he became a call boy at the Theatre Royal in Bilston, and rose to be a stage manager, an actor and a director. In his teens, he also supplemented his acting income by working on a farm for six months, which gave him insight into farming as a way of life when he came to write Emmerdale Farm. In the early 1950s he started his own repertory company at the Everyman Theatre in Reading; he was its artistic director until 1958.

== Writing career ==
Laffan wrote his first plays under the name Kevin Barry. They included Ginger Bred (1951), The Strip-Tease Murder (1955, co-written with Neville Brian), Winner Takes All (1956) and First Innocent (1957). His 1968 play Zoo, Zoo, Widdershins Zoo, about drop-outs, won the first prize for new plays at the 1968 National Union of Students Drama Festival and was produced at Nottingham Playhouse with Lynn Redgrave in the leading role.

Laffan blamed the Roman Catholic Church's ban on artificial birth control for his family's financial problems, saying: "I am a product of my father's belief in God rather than his belief in sex". His play It's Two Foot Six Inches Above the Ground World portrays an Irish Catholic family's family planning problems. Irving Wardle in the Los Angeles Times in 1970 called it "comedy that is clearly rooted in pain"; the New York Times in 2010 called it "potty-mouthed". It carried the warning: "It may not be for those who could find a frank discussion of sexual and religious matters not to their taste." It was a West End hit and was made into a film in 1973 as It's a Two-Foot-Six-Inch-Above-the-Ground World, later retitled The Love Ban. His 1994 play The Missionary and Other Positions is about sex. Other later plays include Never So Good (1976), in which a bomb-wielding terrorist visits a group of black squatters, and Adam Redundant (1989), which reverses the roles in the Garden of Eden by making Satan the hero.

Laffan also became known as a television writer in the 1960s. Bud (1963) was a six-episode serial starring the music-hall comedian Bud Flanagan; Castle Haven (1969) was a serial for ITV about the residents of two converted Victorian houses in a seaside town in Yorkshire, featuring Roy Barraclough, Kathy Staff and Jill Summers. In 1984 he co-wrote with Peter Jones I Thought You'd Gone, a sitcom about parents who wrongly believe their children have left the nest. He wrote episodes of several serials, and also television plays, including Decision to Burn (1971, starring Anthony Hopkins) and The Best Pair of Legs in the Business (1968, with Reg Varney as a holiday camp drag queen), which was remade as a feature film with the same title in 1972.

Emmerdale Farm came about after Laffan was asked to write a lunchtime "farm serial" for ITV after government restrictions on broadcasting hours were relaxed. On his agent's advice, he at first refused, fearing that writing a soap opera would damage his reputation as a playwright, but then wrote the requested three months' worth of episodes "as a 26-episode play [leaving] the end open so that it could continue." He eventually wrote 262 episodes of the serial, which was first broadcast in October 1972, but stopped in 1985 after twelve years because producers wanted "sex, sin and sensationalism" rather than the realism he had intended; however, he remained as a consultant and met Queen Elizabeth II on the set on the programme's 30th anniversary.

Laffan's other big television success was Beryl's Lot, a British sitcom inspired by the real-life story of former maid Margaret Powell.

In 2001 his first novel, Virgins are in Short Supply, was published; he had initially titled it Pendle's Disposal and been unable to find a publisher, but received two offers within a week of changing the title.

== Personal life and death ==
Laffan married Jeanne Thompson in 1952; they had three sons, and lived in Wimbledon. He died of pneumonia two weeks after undergoing heart surgery. His archives are at the University of Leicester.

== Awards ==
- 1959: ATV Television Award for Cut in Ebony
- 1969: Irish Life Award
- 1968: National Union of Students Award
- 1970: Sunday Times Award
