= Sugden family =

Fictional family in the ITV soap opera Emmerdale

- Emmerdale family
- First appearance: Episode 1; 16 October 1972
- Created by: Kevin Laffan
- Introduced by: Kevin Laffan
- Duration: 1972–present

The Sugdens are a fictional family in the ITV soap opera Emmerdale. Introduced during the show's conception in 1972, they were the main family for storylines between the 1970s and 1980s and remained as such for many years. The families original unit consisted of widowed farmer Annie Sugden (Sheila Mercier), alongside her children Peggy Skilbeck (Jo Kendall), Jack Sugden (Andrew Burt and Clive Hornby) and Joe Sugden (Frazer Hines). Subsequently, these characters went on to produce more generations of Sugdens.

The Sugden family are characterized as a hardworking bunch, but the family has struggled with various types of dramatic moments such as Peggy's death and the deaths of the Skilbecks, Jack's affair with Rachel Hughes, Sarah Sugden's death, rivalry between Robert and Jack's adopted son Andy, Andy's abuse on his wife Jo Stiles, a house fire, Robert murdering Andy's ex-wife Katie Addyman as well as his homosexual affair with Aaron Dingle, Andy being framed for murder and going on the run, Jack's daughter Victoria's rape and Robert being sent to prison for murdering her rapist Lee Posner.

As of 2026, Robert, Victoria and her son Harry Sugden, remain the only Sugdens by blood on the show. Additionally, Andy's daughter Sarah Sugden remains on the show but she is not a Sugden by blood. On 7 August 2024, a relative named John Sugden (Oliver Farnworth), revealed to be another son of Jack and Victoria's half brother, joined the series. On 10 June 2026, another relative named Serena Sugden (Casey Al-Shaqsy) was announced to be joining the soap.

== Creation ==
The Sugden family were created in 1972 by Kevin Laffan as one of the show's original family. The Sugden family were the owners of Emmerdale Farm from the programme's early days. Jacob Sugden worked as a local farmer in Emmerdale. With his wife Annie he had two sons, Jack in 1947, Joe in 1949 and a daughter Peggy in 1948. Jacob always neglected his family and was an alcoholic, whereas Annie was left to manage the farm and look after their children. Eventually their daughter Peggy married Matt Skilbeck (Frederick Pyne) and had two children Sam and Sally. Jack left the village in the spring of 1964 after an argument with father Jacob over intensive farming, wanting to see more of the world than Beckindale, and went to London. He had unknowingly got his childhood sweetheart Ruth Harker (also known as Pat) pregnant. She married local thug Tom Merrick (David Hill) that year and tricked him into thinking the baby was his, by telling him the baby was premature. Sometime in the mid-to-late 1960s Jack met and married Lynn Wallace. Shortly afterwards he wrote and published his best seller The Field Of Tares.

Kevin Laffan created the character of Annie Sugden as he was said to be "keen on dominant women" and it has been said that he created a "memorable heroine" in Annie Sugden, "the wife of the ne'er-do-well…who drank himself to an early grave" (the first episode opened with his funeral). Actress (Sheila Mercier) — whose career had been mainly theatrical — was chosen to play the role and went on to be the serial's longest running original actor. Mercier has commented "I had done a lot of television from the stage of the Whitehall, but very little else before joining Emmerdale Farm…I remember, at first, playing to the Gods! Tristan de Vere Cole, one of the first directors on the programme, told me to take [my performance] down until it was so low I was almost muttering. Then, Gordon Flemyng – another of the directors – played back to me a scene I did so that I could see what I had done wrong."" In her 1994 autobiography, Mercier recalls how on so many occasions she wanted Annie to cry but the director, David Green, said "Annie does not cry. She cries all her tears into the pillow at night."

Peggy and her family were killed off in 1973, and Jack married Pat Merrick (Helen Weir). Robert Sugden was introduced as their child played by Richard Smith. In 1989, Christopher Smith took on the role. He remained in the show until 2001, when the character was recast to Karl Davies and he remained until 2005. After a brief return in 2009, the character was recast to Ryan Hawley in 2014. Mercier retired in 1994 appearing in only a handful of Emmerdale episodes, making guest appearances in 1995, 1996 and 2009, whilst Joe Sugden was killed off off-screen in 1995. Jack remarried Sarah Connolly (Madeleine Howard/Alyson Spiro). Their daughter Victoria Sugden (Jessica Heywood/Hannah Midgley/Isabel Hodgins) was born on-screen in 1994. Jack lastly remarried to Diane Blackstock (Elizabeth Estensen) who remains the Sugden matriarch.

Apart from the blood related Sugden's there were many others who were related to the Sugden's and were treated like other members of the family, these were;

Matt Skilbeck whose first wife was Peggy, continued to live at Emmerdale Farm long after her death. He later brought his second wife; Dolly Skilbeck to live at the farm in 1978. Dolly was treated by Annie, Joe and Jack as a daughter and sister, respectively. Matt and Dolly had a son; Sam Skilbeck in 1982, whom Annie treated as a grandson. Even after Matt left Beckindale in December 1989, Dolly and Sam remained welcome at the farm.

Sandie Merrick was Jack's step-daughter, she is the only child of Pat and her first husband; Tom Merrick, however this didn't stop her and Jack from being close themselves, Jack was supportive to Sandie when she fell pregnant at the age of 17 in 1983, The Sugden's made sure that Sandie was part of their family, Joe even gave his step-niece a job at NY Estates over Eric Pollard who was more qualified.

Rachel Hughes and her younger brother Mark Hughes were the children of Kate and her first husband; David, much like the Merrick family a decade before, the Hughes family would become related to the Sugden's through Kate's marriage to Joe who at first found it hard being a stepfather, sought Jack's advice on how he became close to his own step-daughter; Sandie, Jack said that it would take time but admitted that Sandie was more mature than Mark when she had been his age, and easier to get on with than the Hughes siblings, eventually Rachel and Mark settled down at Emmerdale Farm and became close with other family members, Mark even got a crush on his older Step-cousin; Sandie, Joe reassured Kate that he would look after Rachel and Mark when their marriage ended in 1991, and the Hughes siblings were more or less adopted by Joe, since he had no children of his own, something which bothered him in the 1980s when he saw how settled and happy Jack and Matt were with their own families, so having Rachel and Mark gave Joe the family he always wanted.

== In Emmerdale ==
The audience was introduced to farmer's wife Annie Sugden in the soap's first episode in 1972. It was a time of sadness for the Sugden family, as they were burying their recently deceased father, Jacob, who had died after spending much of his later years in the pub, The Woolpack, drinking away the family's farming profits. Early central storylines in the serial followed the Sugden family, especially Annie as she struggled to come to terms with the death of her husband, support her family, and run Emmerdale Farm, set in the Yorkshire Dales in Beckindale. Matriarchal Annie aimed to rebuild the ailing farm by reuniting her two feuding sons, Jack and Joe. She sold part of Emmerdale Farm to village outsider, Henry Wilks, who had made his fortune in the wool industry and brought his business acumen to Beckindale. In 1973, Peggy dies of a brain hemorrhage a few months after giving birth to twins and three years later, Peggy's twins were killed on a level crossing, leaving Annie to comfort their father Matt. Soon after Jack returned to London and Joe married Christine Sharp. Joe and Christine's marriage was short lived as Christine decided that she did not want to be a farmer's wife. Christine returned the following year to reconcile but Joe wanted a divorce and she left for good. Three years later, Jack returned, and it was revealed he was suffering from writer's block and needed some time away from London. Annie offered him some advice and he took it on board, before departing back to London on good terms with his family.

Jack eventually returned in 1980 vowing to stay for good as he wanted to settle down. Ruth Harker, now calling herself "Pat", returned to the village with Jackie Merrick (Ian Sharrock) and her daughter, Sandie Merrick (Jane Hutcheson) after leaving her husband Tom for good and reunited with Jack. During this time, Jackie discovered that Jack was his biological father and took the news badly and there was an unease between the two. In October 1982, Jack and Pat married but less than two years into the marriage, Jack began an affair with local newspaper reporter, Karen Moore (Annie Hulley). Pat found out and demanded Jack choose between her and Karen and he chooses Pat and they reconciled. In 1985, Pat learned that she pregnant and gave birth to Jack's second son, Robert (Richard Smith), on 22 April 1986. Jack was left devastated when Pat died in a car crash four months later, leaving him to bring up Robert with the help of Annie.

In 1988, Joe meets divorcee Kate Hughes (Sally Knyvette), and her two teenage children, Rachel (Glenda McKay) and Mark Hughes (Craig McKay). Initially Kate and Joe argued after he shot her dog for bothering his sheep but eventually they fell in love. They married in 1989 after Joe proposed but with Mark and Rachel opposed and wanting Kate to reconcile with their father, David) (Martyn Whitby), Joe became worried. They married and Kate's children eventually came round to their mother's new marriage. In 1990, Kate accidentally ran over Pete Whiteley, killing him and was jailed for a year but was released the following January. Kate told Joe the marriage was over and returned to Sheffield. Rachel and Mark decided to stay and Joe formed a closer relationship with them. After a lengthy period of grieving, Jack began dating again when he met mobile librarian, Sarah Connolly (Madeleine Howard), in 1988; Sarah also became a mother figure to Robert. Jackie disliked Sarah at first and felt that she was trying to replace Pat but warmed to her thanks to intervention from his wife Kathy (Malandra Burrows). Jack was left bitter and angry when Jackie died in a shooting accident in August 1989 and Sarah was there for him. The couple moved in together in 1990, and Jack often proposed but she keeps turning him down. Sarah fell pregnant in 1993 and gives birth to a daughter in March 1994, Victoria (Jessica Heywood).

Annie and her second husband, Leonard Kempinski (Bernard Archard), whom she had married in October 1993, plan to go on holiday to Spain. A plane crashed into Emmerdale village and left Annie comatose and Leonard dead. Jack and Sarah married in May 1994 and in the same month the village was renamed Emmerdale. Joe left the village soon after and died off-screen in 1995. After moving to Spain in 1994, Annie returned to Emmerdale in 1995 to bury her son Joe, who had died in a car accident. 23 years after his first proposal, Amos Brearly (Ronald Magill) proposed to Annie again; this time she accepted. Annie and Amos returned to Spain where they married on 5 November 1995, though Annie returned briefly on 7 November 1996 to ask Jack to sell Emmerdale Farm; he refused. Jack and Sarah's marriage was tested when Jack had a fling with Sarah's friend and Jack's former stepniece, Rachel Tate (Glenda McKay) but they reconciled. The Sugdens adopted Andy Hopwood (Kelvin Fletcher) a school friend of Robert (now Christopher Smith ). By the end of the 1990s, Jack and Sarah's marriage was in trouble again when Jack suggested that Robert and Andy work on the farm rather than attend school and money problems worsened. They took in a lodger, Richie Carter (Glenn Lamont) and Sarah, feeling neglected began an affair with Richie and left Jack. Sarah got custody of Victoria (now Hannah Midgley) and Jack got custody of Robert and Andy. Andy put the barn on fire to help Jack claim on the insurance but the plan went wrong when Sarah was killed and Jack was arrested as the chief suspect. Andy came clean to Richie about the fire and begged him to change his statement and he agreed, resulting in Jack's freedom. Jack later began dating Woolpack landlady Diane Blackstock (Elizabeth Estensen).

Andy began dating Katie Addyman (Sammy Winward). Robert and Andy went to a nightclub with Eve Birch (Raine Davison), Marc Reynolds (Anthony Lewis), Ollie Reynolds (Vicky Binns), Donna Windsor (Verity Rushworth), Robert (now Karl Davies) and Katie. When they missed the bus, they stole a car and accidentally killed their headteacher Barbara Strickland (Alex Hall). They attempted to cover up their crime and burned the car. After living with guilt, the group confessed and everyone apart from Marc (who was driving) were given community service. Andy and Katie decided to have a baby to change his mind, but when Brian (Katie's father) learned that Katie was pregnant, he sent her to live with her mother. She returned and moved in with Andy, but had a miscarriage. Despite this, she and Andy decided to get married and started planning their wedding. Katie, however, felt neglected by Andy working long hours and turned to Robert when he promised her excitement.

When Andy discovered Robert (now Karl Davies) was having an affair with his wife, Katie (Sammy Winward), he waited for Robert in his caravan with a shotgun, intending to shoot him but accidentally shot Jack instead. Having almost died, Jack initially disowned Andy but they reconciled and Jack and Diane planned to marry but she revealed that she had colon cancer and underwent chemotherapy. The couple married and enjoyed a honeymoon in Las Vegas while Diane recovered. Andy soon got 15-year-old Debbie Dingle's (Charley Webb) pregnant and she gave birth to their daughter Sarah. After a revenge attempt against Andy for killing Sarah backfired, resulting in the death of Max King (Charlie Kemp), Robert fled from the village.

Jack and Diane assumed responsibility for Andy's half-brother, Daz Eden (Luke Tittensor), as they did with Andy a decade earlier. Andy and Daz's father, Billy (David Crellin), Andy and Daz's real father, was released from prison and returned to Emmerdale much to the Ire of various residents, having robbed the Post Office and killed Vic Windsor (Alun Lewis) on Christmas Day 1998. Meanwhile, Andy saw Jo was better with Sarah and restarted their affair. Andy was about to tell Katie when she announces that she could be pregnant, which soon became clear is a false alarm. Andy told her about his and Jo's affair. Katie threw them out but they soon returned as Andy was the leaseholder so Katie moved out instead and moved her business to Home Farm. Before Katie left, she wished Jo luck, telling her she will need it. Andy and Katie subsequently divorced.

Victoria (now played by Isabel Hodgins) returned from Annie in Spain, later than expected, prompting Jack and Diane to worry but returned safely. Victoria and Kayleigh went clubbing but Kayleigh left early. Victoria flirted with an older boy and he tried to force himself on her but Billy Hopwood (David Crellin) stopped him and rescued her. Billy drove her home but his brakes failed, due to Kelly Windsor (Adele Silva) sabotaging them, and they crashed into a lake. Victoria almost drowned, only escaping as Jack, Andy and Daz arrived. Jack blamed Billy until Victoria told him that Billy had saved her life.

Victoria began looking for answers to the cause of Sarah Sr's death. She tracked down Richie who told her to ask Jack. In an attempt to force a confession, she doused the furniture in petrol and demanded the truth, Andy confessed but a fire soon ignited. Following Andy's confession, he was sentenced to three years imprisonment in January 2008 after confessing to manslaughter. Andy and Jo married on 19 February 2008 in prison. When Andy was released, he was not pleased to find that things had changed. He began lashing out at Jo, giving her a black eye in one instance. The abuse continued for months and culminated in Andy getting seriously injured during a confrontation in a barn. Jo eventually left after Lee Naylor (Lewis Linford) helped her sell the farm equipment to fund her escape.

Jack visited Annie in Spain in 2008 and remained for several months until Annie informed the family of Jack's death of a heart attack on 5 February 2009, leaving them devastated. Robert returned briefly for the funeral and left Emmerdale again. Daz and Victoria slept together in a deserted barn. Victoria was thrilled, thinking she and Daz were a couple now but Daz told her that he wasn't going to dump Scarlett. He felt guilty about cheating on Scarlett and told Victoria that it was a mistake and they should forget about it. Victoria hoped Daz would change his mind but when he didn't, Victoria told him that she was pregnant, just as he and Scarlett were going away for a weekend.

He told Victoria that she'd have to see a doctor and that people would think he was a pervert if they announced that she was expecting his baby, so Victoria admitted she'd lied. Furious, Daz moved back into Dale View with Jake. Knowing Daz would be annoyed, Victoria reconciled with Aaron Livesy (Danny Miller). In May, Aaron and Victoria slept together and, thinking Daz and Jake would be at work, she "borrowed" Jake's keys and took Aaron to Dale View. Unfortunately Daz and Scarlett went home for lunch and found them there. Angry, Daz went for Aaron and trying to stop them fighting, Victoria blurted out that Daz didn't want her any more, making Aaron and Scarlett realised Daz and Victoria's relationship was more than brother/sister.

Sarah became ill and was diagnosed with Fanconi anaemia, a genetic disorder which could kill her without treatment. Debbie and Andy then started looking for donors and find one but they pulled out at the last moment. It was suggested to them that another baby or 'Saviour Sibling' could save their sick child. They applied for IVF but were turned down when the hospital learned that they were not a genuine couple as they need to be to qualify for funding for IVF. Debbie then suggested they tried artificial insemination despite their partners Cameron Murray (Dominic Power) and Alicia Gallagher (Natalie Anderson) being unhappy with this situation, they choose to go ahead regardless but were unsuccessful, despite trying repeatedly. Debbie believed the only way to conceive is for them to sleep together. Desperate to save her daughter, Debbie got Andy to meet her at a hotel and apologized for her previous actions and seduced him, telling him it was just about them and that she wanted him. Debbie discovered that she was pregnant and Andy was delighted, while Cameron felt left out but believed the baby was a result of artificial insemination.

Andy took in Kerry Wyatt (Laura Norton) after her daughter Amy (Chelsea Halfpenny) threw her out. Debbie went into labour in October and gave birth to a boy and they named him Jack after Andy's late adoptive father. Andy and Amy shared a kiss and Amy eventually tells Kerry.m Andy's relationship with Kerry came to an end after Sarah and Jack are left in danger when Kerry got drunk and dropped a cigarette, starting a fire. Desperate to win Andy back, Kerry told him she was pregnant but after a hit and run incident with Adam Barton (Adam Thomas) and Robbie Lawson (Jamie Shelton), she told Andy that she was never pregnant but that she loved him. Angry at her behaviour, he rejected her and dated Amy for a while.

Victoria was heartbroken to learn that Adam had slept with local vet Vanessa Woodfield (Michelle Hardwick) and had impregnated her. She went on a downward spiral. The following day, Adam notices Victoria attempting to drive her car, knowing that she has not passed her driving test and did not have a previsional license, and tried to stop her. She did not listen, and as she drove off, she ran over Ashley Thomas (John Middleton). He appeared to be fine, however, he later collapsed and was comatose. Victoria was terrified she would be imprisoned, so Adam gave her a false alibi. However, Ashley's alcoholic ex-wife Laurel (Charlotte Bellamy) drunkenly announced that Ashley has died while in hospital, unaware that he was still comatose. Victoria could not deal with her guilt and handed herself in to the police, and she is arrested. She was later released, and was delighted to hear that Ashley is alive. Adam and Victoria rekindled their relationship and decided to run away and get married, with the help of Aaron.

In 2014, Andy started a romantic relationship with his stepsister, Bernice Blackstock (Samantha Giles). At the opening night of Bernice's beauty salon their affair was made public. Later in 2014, Andy suffered an accident to his arm while working at Butlers Farm which was caused by Adam. Bernice did her best to support Andy through this. Katie accompanied Andy to a hospital appointment. When they arrived back from the hospital, Andy kissed Katie which Bernice witnessed from her window. Bernice was devastated and Andy later ended the relationship and reunited with Katie. Robert (now played by Ryan Hawley) returned to Emmerdale with his fiancée, Chrissie White (Louise Marwood), future father-in-law Lawrence White (John Bowe) and future stepson, Lachlan White (Thomas Atkinson). Andy and Katie eventually remarried. Andy and Katie planned to buy Wylies Farm and restore it. Robert tried to sabotage the sale as his future father-in-law, Lawrence White owned the farm. Katie was also convinced that Robert was cheating on Chrissie with another woman. Robert cottoned on to this and tried to lead Katie on by pretending it was Alicia. Katie confronted Robert over his "other woman" on numerous occasions in The Woolpack, which Robert denied.

In February 2015, Katie died after finally discovering that Robert had been having an affair with a man, Aaron Livesy (Danny Miller). Robert did not want Chrissie to find out so he pushed Katie and she fell through rotting floorboards, breaking her neck and killing her. Andy began a sexual relationship with Tracy Shankley (Amy Walsh), and also made a move on ex-girlfriend, Bernice. He later ended his relationship with Tracey after realizing that the relationship wasn't right, and eventually got back on the straight and narrow. Andy later discovered that Robert murdered Andy went up to Butler's Farm to get hold of a gun. Ross Barton (Michael Parr) and Andy agreed to shoot each other's brother therefore giving them an alibi with no evidence that either of them was involved in either of the shootings. Later that night, Ross shot Robert on Andy's behalf, although he survived and Andy backed out of the plan to kill Pete. Andy later went on the run after being framed. Robert was shocked when Aaron revealed that Gordon had raped him as a child. Robert learned that Chrissie had begun a relationship with his brother Andy.

Robert asked Chrissie's sister, Rebecca White (Emily Head) to come to the village to help him with his vendetta against Chrissie. She sent a DNA test off to prove Lawrence was not Chrissie's biological father. After rejecting Rebecca's advances Robert confided in Victoria that he is going to propose to Aaron. Lachlan told Aaron that Robert was sleeping with Rebecca. With Lachlan back in the boot, Robert admitted to Aaron that he was bisexual and did have an affair with Rebecca before getting serious with Chrissie. Robert told Aaron that when he was 15 he had a feelings for a male farmhand. Jack caught them together and beat Robert. Robert got drunk, destroyed his and Aaron's home, and sought comfort from Rebecca, telling her that he and Aaron were over. They slept together, but Robert immediately regretted it the next morning. Rebecca became pregnant tried to force Rebecca to have an abortion, but she refused. Rebecca went into labor and, with Robert present, delivered a baby boy named Sebastian. In early 2017, Victoria and Adam decide to try for a baby. Victoria was horrified to find a man had broken into her Diddy Diner truck, and even more so when the culprit knew her. She was shocked but pleased when the man turned out to be Hannah Barton, who had transformed into a man and went by the name Matty Barton (Ash Palmisciano). Matty revealed that Moira was unaccepting about the change and threw him out. Victoria tried to convince Matty that he should give Moira a second chance as she's bound to be shocked, but the pair are disgusted when they walk into Butlers Farm to hear Moira insulting Matty. Matty makes the decision to return to Manchester, despite Victoria's offers to allow him to stay with her. She drops Matty off at the train station when Cain fails to convince him to stay. After being beaten up, Matty decides to come back and stay with Moira at Butler's farm.

== Generations ==
- Joshua Sugden, married unknown woman
  - Orton Sugden, married unknown woman
    - Joseph Sugden, son of Orton and unknown woman, married Margaret Oldroyd
      - Jacob Sugden, son of Joseph and Margaret, married Annie Pearson (deceased)
        - Peggy Skilbeck (deceased), daughter of Jacob and Annie, married Matt Skilbeck
          - Sam Skilbeck (deceased), son of Peggy and Matt
          - Sally Skilbeck (deceased), daughter of Peggy and Matt
        - Jack Sugden (deceased), son of Jacob and Annie, married Pat Merrick (deceased), Sarah Connolly (deceased) and Diane Blackstock
          - Jackie Merrick (deceased), son of Jack and Pat, married Kathy Bates
          - Robert Sugden, son of Jack and Pat, married Chrissie White (deceased) and Aaron Dingle
            - Sebastian White, son of Robert and Rebecca White
          - John Sugden, son of Jack and Barbara
          - Victoria Sugden, daughter of Jack and Sarah, married Adam Barton
            - Harry Sugden, son of Victoria and Lee Posner (deceased)
          - Andy Sugden, son of Billy and Trisha Hopwood, adopted by Jack and Sarah, married Katie Addyman (deceased) and Jo Stiles
            - Sarah Sugden, daughter of Andy and Debbie Dingle
              - Leyla Sugden, adopted daughter of Sarah and Jacob Sugden
            - Jack Sugden, son of Andy and Debbie
        - Joe Sugden (deceased), son of Jacob and Annie, married Christine Sharp and Kate Hughes (deceased)
      - Edward Sugden, son of Joseph and Margaret

== Reception ==
The episode which saw Andy set fire to the barn won the "Spectacular Scene of the Year" award at the 2001 British Soap Awards. Also, the accident involving Victoria and Billy was nominated for "Spectacular Scene of the Year" at the 2007 British Soap Awards. Almost all the Sugden characters, bar Victoria, were selected as one of the "top 100 British soap characters" by industry experts for a poll to be run by What's on TV, with readers able to vote for their favourite character to discover "Who is Soap's greatest Legend?" In 2020, Gary Gillatt from Inside Soap expressed hope that the soap would introduce new Sugden family members to "breathe new life into the most Emmerdale of clans".
