= List of Emmerdale characters introduced in 1990 =

The following is a list of characters that first appeared in the British soap opera Emmerdale in 1990, by order of first appearance. This year saw the introduction of a new family, the Feldmanns. Siblings Elsa and Michael debuted in February while their mother, Elizabeth appeared the following month. Councillor Charlie Aindow, in a new love interest for Dolly Skilbeck began appearing in August and Peter Whiteley, son of established characters Pete and Lynn was born in the same month.

== Gary and Dan ==
Gary and Dan
- Emmerdale character
- Portrayed by: Gary Halliday (Gary); Julian Walsh (Dan)
- Duration: 1990–1992
- First appearance: 11 January 1990
- Last appearance: 26 March 1992
- Introduced by: Stuart Doughty
In-universe information
- Occupation: Students

Gary, played by Gary Halliday, and Dan, played by Julian Walsh, are school friends of Mark Hughes. The three plan to catch and sell wild mink by setting traps in the woodland but end up catching Lucy, Mark's mother Kate's new puppy, in the traps. Lucy is freed and there is no damage. At Mark's sister Rachel's post-exam party, Dan and Gary spike the punch, unaware that it has already been topped up with alcohol by Joe Sugden and Rachel herself, leading to Rachel collapsing with alcohol poisoning.

The following year, Dan and Gary convince Mark to talk to Paula Barker, who agrees to date him but the relationship goes nowhere. Dan and Gary then play a prank on Sarah Connolly by sending her an anonymous Valentine's card but their sniggering gives them away. At Hallowe'en, Mark and Dan run around in masks scaring the women of the village. When Mark throws a party, Dan and Gary invite some friends but things go awry when their friend attacks Jack Sugden with a plank of wood. This is Gary's last appearance. Dan is last seen when he tries to chat up some female holidaymakers at the holiday village but is pushed into the pool for his trouble.

== George Starkey ==
George Starkey
- Emmerdale character
- Portrayed by: James Noble
- First appearance: 8 February 1990
- Last appearance: 22 March 1990
- Introduced by: Stuart Doughty
In-universe information
- Occupation: Lorry Driver

George Starkey, played by James Noble, is a lorry driver for Tate Haulage. He returns the late Jackie Merrick's sweater to his widow, Kathy, which Jackie had left behind at a cafe down in Southampton several months before his death. George reveals he had met a psychic woman and drops Kathy off in Southampton to meet her. However, Chris Tate is unhappy and promptly fires George, who ignores his warning.

George appeals to Chris's father, Frank, but he refuses to help him. George then threatens to expose a dark secret unless he complies, which Frank refuses to do so again. George then reveals to Chris that Frank is behind the death of his mother, Jean five years earlier. Frank refuses to give George a reference, and he leans on Frank's current wife Kim to get Frank to change his mind but his request falls on deaf ears. George then spray-paints that Frank killed Jean, on the Woolpack Wall which results in an enraged Chris attacking him. This is not enough to stop George writing the same statement on the side of his truck and causes a scene at the Hunt Ball. Frank then reveals the truth about Jean's death, which was a suicide by overdosing on painkillers while he left a walk. George then leaves the village as his plan for revenge fails.

== Elsa Feldmann ==
Elsa Feldmann
- Emmerdale character
- Portrayed by: Naomi Lewis (1990–1994); Natasha Gray (1999, 2001)
- Duration: 1990–1991, 1993–1994, 1999, 2001
- First appearance: 8 February 1990
- Last appearance: 12 December 2001
- Introduced by: Stuart Doughty (1990); Morag Bain (1993); Kieran Roberts (1999); Steve Frost (2001)
In-universe information
- Other names: Elsa Chappell
- Mother: Elizabeth Pollard
- Brothers: Michael Feldmann
- Husband: Brett Chappell (1998–)
- Daughters: Alice Bates
- Grandfathers: Barry Jeffries; Max Feldmann
- Grandmothers: Constance Jeffries
- Aunts: Margaret

Elsa Chappell (née Feldmann) first appeared in 1990 with her mother Elizabeth and brother Michael after they were being evicted from their house by Frank Tate. Elsa soon began dating Nick Bates and they got engaged and planned to marry on Valentine's Day 1991. However, Elsa was pregnant and gave birth to a daughter, Alice. As they were unable to get her to the hospital in time, Zoe Tate acted as midwife and helped deliver Alice. The couple separated, with Elsa leaving Nick on Christmas Day 1991, taking Alice with her. She soon realized that she wasn't ready for motherhood and Alice returned to Nick custody before Elsa left the village.

Following the death of her mother in the plane crash in December 1993, Elsa returned to Emmerdale for her funeral and tried to get custody by spreading rumours that Nick and his best friend, Archie Brooks, were gay. However, a court ruled in Nick's favour and Elsa left the village. After living in Australia for a while, Elsa returned in 1999 with a new husband, Brett, and stepson, Shane, hoping to take Alice to live with her in Australia. During Elsa's absence, Nick was imprisoned for manslaughter after killing a poacher and Alice went to live with his sister, Kathy Glover. Kathy, who was very close to her niece, let Elsa take Alice as she saw Alice wanted parents and a step brother, not an aunt. Kathy visited Elsa in 2001 and brought Alice home but Elsa followed and after seeing that Alice was happy with Kathy, suggested that Kathy join them to Australia with her and Alice. Kathy agreed and they returned to Australia.

== Michael Feldmann ==
Michael Feldmann
- Emmerdale character
- Portrayed by: Matthew Vaughan
- Duration: 1990–1994, 2010–2011
- First appearance: 13 February 1990
- Last appearance: 4 January 2011
- Introduced by: Stuart Doughty (1990); Gavin Blyth (2010)
In-universe information
- Mother: Elizabeth Pollard
- Sisters: Elsa Chappell
- Grandfathers: Barry Jeffries; Max Feldmann
- Grandmothers: Constance Jeffries
- Aunts: Margaret
- Nieces: Alice Bates

Michael Feldmann, played by Matthew Vaughan, first appears on 13 February 1990 when his younger sister, Elsa, introduces him to her friends Nick Bates, Mark Hughes and Rachel Hughes while on a night out at the Black Bull pub in Hotten. When Mark is bounced for being underage, the teens are cornered in the car park by some bikers, who attack Mark and Nick, due to Nick insulting them earlier. Michael intervenes when the police arrive and Nick thanks Michael. Michael and Elsa, along with their mother, Elizabeth, are later evicted from their land on Blackthorn Farm by their landlord Frank Tate.

Michael seeks employment working for Annie and Jack Sugden and is later accused of arson, when one of the barns burns down, but is cleared – this is proven to be the work of a labourer from another estate. Michael begins a relationship with Rachel. However, this was jeopardised after he had a one-night stand with Zoe Tate, who later comes out as a lesbian.

In 1992 Michael takes part in an armed robbery of Home Farm, which leaves Joe Sugden badly injured and fighting for his life. The robbery was organised by Neil Kincaid's stable hand, Steve Marshal. Following his mother Elizabeth's marriage to Eric Pollard, several months later, Michael is arrested for his involvement in the attack, and consequently sentenced to four months' imprisonment. Michael resents his mother's relationship with Eric and attacks him the Woolpack, punching him. When Elizabeth is killed, in the Emmerdale plane crash of 1993, Michael accuses Eric of murder. It transpires that Elizabeth had uncovered evidence of Eric committing cheque fraud, for which he had framed Michael, and was about to report him to the police when she was killed by falling plane debris. Eric is then suspected of murdering Elizabeth and things are not helped when Eric's first wife, Eileen Pollock, arrives and claims that Eric and Elizabeth's marriage was bigamous. This leads to a fight between Michael and Eric, which sees Eric pinning Michael to the floor. Elsa arrives and Michael takes advantage of the distraction to shove Eric, who hits head on the coffee table. Elsa, believing that Michael has killed Eric, tells Michael to run and he flees in Eric's car, which he later abandons at an airport.

In 2010 Eric begins receiving letters, messages and cards, claiming to be from Elizabeth. Originally suspecting the messages to be sent by Amy Wyatt, it is on 30 December, 17 years to the day of the plane crash, that the messages are instead found to be from Michael. Michael, who has been in-and-out of jail, confronts Eric at Elizabeth's grave. He later follows Eric back to The Grange, where he again confronts him, prompting him to reveal his history to his current wife, Val. Michael then leaves. However, he later informs Amy that he wants Eric to pay him a large sum or money, otherwise he will reveal Eric to be a murderer. Eric tells Michael to come in his car with him, and he will pay him off. Eric drives Michael to a remote area, however, and, after an exchange of words, Eric produces a tyre iron, advancing on Michael, who cowers into a corner. The result of the incident was not revealed. Eric returns to Emmerdale alone, appearing at edge and nervous, telling Val that he had given Michael a lift to the station.

Michael reappears on 4 January to confront Eric, who refuses to give him any more money. After 17 years, Eric finally reveals what happened – that he had considered killing Elizabeth that night, but that she had been killed in the plane crash first. Val supports her husband, obtaining a copy of the coroner's report, which confirms Elizabeth was killed by falling debris. Val tells Michael it is time he stopped blaming Eric. After a calm discussion, Michael agrees to leave and Eric gives him some money in order to look after himself and Michael drives out of the village into the night.

== Elizabeth Feldmann ==
Elizabeth Feldmann
- Emmerdale character
- Portrayed by: Kate Dove
- Duration: 1990–1993
- First appearance: 22 March 1990
- Last appearance: 30 December 1993
- Introduced by: Stuart Doughty
In-universe information
- Other names: Elizabeth Pollard
- Father: Barry Jeffries
- Mother: Constance Jeffries
- Sisters: Margaret
- Husband: Mr Feldmann (backstory); Eric Pollard (1992–1993; void)
- Sons: Michael Feldmann
- Daughters: Elsa Chappell
- Granddaughters: Alice Bates

Elizabeth Pollard (previously Feldmann), played by Kate Dove, arrived in the village with her son Michael and daughter Elsa in 1990. She found herself fighting between the affections of Alan Turner and Eric Pollard. Elizabeth chose Eric and married him in October 1992; she was unaware that Eric was still legally married to his first wife Eileen and was committing bigamy.

Eventually, Elizabeth discovered that Eric had planted a typewriter on her son, Michael, in order to disguise the fact that he himself had committed cheque fraud and was prepared to let Michael take the blame. On 30 December 1993, Elizabeth left Eric, informing him that she would report him to the police. He tried to dissuade her, saying that if she reported him, she herself would face prosecution for her role in the theft of antique vases, however, Elizabeth admitted that her own imprisonment would be worth that of Eric's. Shortly afterwards, Elizabeth was killed in the plane crash that struck the village. Her son, Michael, however, as well as a majority of villagers, believed that Eric had actually murdered her in order to stop her from exposing his fraudulent activities.

Nearly seventeen years after her death, in December 2010, Eric started to receive notes, messages and Christmas greetings, signed from Elizabeth. Originally believing them to be from Amy Wyatt (Chelsea Halfpenny), it later transpired that Elizabeth's son Michael had been sending the notes and returned to the village after 16 years of absence, in order to make Eric pay for the murder of his mother. Eric told Val on 3 January 2011 about the night of the plane crash 17 years before and stated the events leading up to her death such as about the cheque fraud and stolen Roman bracelet. He then stated that he went round to see her then after a brief row she had stormed out of the house and he followed her, caught up with her and tried to get her to listen and that she had run off into the night screaming but a tree near her burst into flames as plane wreckage shot down and the sky lit up. Eric explains that he went back a bit later and found her dead. On 4 January 2011, Eric's current wife Val Pollard (Charlie Hardwick) obtained the coroners report into Elizabeth's death which confirmed she had been killed by falling debris from the plane.

In May 2011, Eric mentioned her when he and David were looking for Amy in Hotten, and she is mentioned once again in July 2015 when Val, facing prison for committing fraud against the Bank, reminds Eric (who is upset over her actions) that he once tried to "defraud his dead ex-wife", referring to Elizabeth. In October 2015, Lawrence White (John Bowe) threatens Eric with legal action over his past if he gives evidence against Chrissie Sugden (Louise Marwood) in court. Lawrence tells Eric that he will get his lawyers to dig up dirt on his past, including "an ex-wife who died in mysterious circumstances" before saying "What was her name, Elizabeth?" His threat leads to Eric not giving evidence against Chrissie in court, suggesting that he may have had a more guilty role in Elizabeth's death than stated back in 2011.

== Debbie Wilson ==
Debbie Wilson
- Emmerdale character
- Portrayed by: Debbie Arnold
- First appearance: 12 April 1990
- Last appearance: 29 May 1990
- Introduced by: Stuart Doughty

Debbie Wilson, portrayed by Debbie Arnold, visits Eric Pollard to ask for advice about starting up an antiques business. Eric is attracted to Debbie and accepts her invitation to look at properties for her shop in Hotten. Debbie tells Eric about her late husband, Barry and explains that she is ready to move on, before flirting with Eric. Debbie asks Eric to invest in her business, which he agrees. He invests £1500 in her business, and they celebrate.

Eric begins angering auction bidders when he makes Debbie's bid final on some of the auctions, but Debbie continues to be charmed by him. Eric proposes to Debbie and she accepts. She later asks Eric if she can borrow more money to take stock out of storage, and he agrees. However, Debbie cons Eric out of the money and flees the village.

== Martin Bennett ==
Martin Bennett
- Emmerdale character
- Portrayed by: John Pickles
- Duration: 1990–1991
- First appearance: 12 April 1990
- Last appearance: 30 May 1991
- Introduced by: Stuart Doughty
In-universe information
- Occupation: Vet

Martin Bennett, played by John Pickles, is a veterinarian who hires a recently graduated Zoe Tate to work for him. Zoe finds the job enjoyable at first but when her friends, Archie Brooks, Michael Feldmann and Rachel Hughes discover that Martin has signed a contract with Skipdale Laboratories, allowing them to experiment on animals. They show Zoe proof, and she confronts Martin, who admits it. Zoe threatens to resign but Martin lies that he's disassociated his company with them. However, in May, she discovers this lie, and he tells her he cannot afford turn down business based on principles. As a result, Zoe quits her job.

== Fran Carter ==
Fran Carter
- Emmerdale character
- Portrayed by: Heather Wright
- First appearance: 7 August 1990
- Last appearance: 30 October 1990
- Introduced by: Stuart Doughty

Fran Carter, played by Heather Wright, is an old school friend of Kate Sugden who she invites to stay with her family at Emmerdale Farm. Kate and Fran share a drink and catch up on old times but Fran proves to be a distraction to Kate from her farm duties much to the irritation of Kate's husband, Joe. Fran also annoys Joe's mother, Annie when she asks if she can smoke in the farmhouse.

While driving home on the way from the Woolpack, Kate and Fran knock over Pete Whiteley, who Kate had been arguing with earlier in the evening. Kate panics and Fran checks Pete over but urges Kate to drive off as she is over the limit. When they arrive home, Fran calls an ambulance, which arrives to the scene to tend to Pete, who dies of his injuries in hospital. Kate is then breathalyzed and taken to the police station and formally charged then bailed. Joe, livid that Fran has been released without charge, angrily packs her belongings and throws her out. Fran returns two months later when Kate stands trial and takes the stand and is cross-examined by the prosecution. Following Kate's sentencing to two years, Fran apologises to Joe who is still angry and warns her to stay away.

== Charlie Aindow ==
Charlie Aindow
- Emmerdale character
- Portrayed by: David Fleeshman
- Duration: 1990–1992
- First appearance: 9 August 1990
- Last appearance: 30 April 1992
- Introduced by: Stuart Doughty

Charlie Aindow, played by David Fleeshman, first appeared in the village in 1990. Charlie was a councillor but was not all he seemed. The truth was that he was corrupt and quickly got involved in dodgy schemes with local villain Eric Pollard.

Shortly after arriving, Charlie falls for feisty barmaid Dolly Acaster, whose ex-husband Matt Skilbeck has just left the village, leaving her depressed. After initial bonding, Charlie and Dolly begin an affair which carries on until the revelation that Dolly is pregnant brings him back to reality. Not wanting to be a father, Charlie advises Dolly to get an abortion, which she does. Despite this, he is devastated when she leaves the village in Autumn 1991 to reunite with Matt in Norfolk. Realising what he has lost and not popular amongst the villagers, Charlie leaves Beckindale in 1992.

== Tony Charlton ==
Tony Charlton
- Emmerdale character
- Portrayed by: Stephen Rashbrook
- Duration: 1990–1991
- First appearance: 23 August 1990
- Last appearance: 18 July 1991
- Introduced by: Stuart Doughty
In-universe information
- Occupation: Vicar

Tony Charlton, played by Stephen Rashbrook, is a newly ordained Vicar who arrives in Beckindale to begin Ministry at St. Mary's Church. His first act in the village is to preside over the funeral of the recently deceased Pete Whiteley. A modern vicar, Tony is often interested in the needs of his younger parishioners and very rarely seen with his dog-collar on. Tony begins spending time with Kathy Merrick much to the chagrin of Chris Tate, who is in love with Kathy. Tony and Kathy enjoy each other's company and Kathy gives Tony horse riding lessons. Tony later leaves the village to return to London, he was previously a teacher of English Literature, before joining the church.

== Peter Whiteley ==
Peter Whiteley
- Emmerdale character
- Portrayed by: Sam Walker
- Duration: 1990–1994
- First appearance: 28 August 1990
- Last appearance: 4 August 1994
- Introduced by: Stuart Doughty
In-universe information
- Father: Pete Whiteley
- Mother: Lynn Whiteley
- Other relatives: Bill Whiteley

Peter Whiteley was the son of Pete and Lynn Whiteley and appeared from 1990 to 1994 during the first four years of his life. He was born on the same day of the funeral of his father, Pete, who had been run over and killed by his lover's mother Kate Sugden. Lynn began to raise Peter as a single mother. On the night of the plane crash, Lynn left Peter with a babysitter whilst she went to The Woolpack and Whiteley's Farm was hit by falling debris from the plame and set on fire. The babysitter managed to get out of the house and save Peter and he was later reunited with his mother, although their home was destroyed. Peter left the village with his mother to live with her new lover, Sven Olsen, in Australia in August 1994.

== Others ==
Character	Date(s)	Actor	Circumstances
Wilf Henshaw	8 February–6 March	Danny O'Dea (8 episodes)	Wilf is the Malt Shovel's resident Dominoes champion who defects to the Woolpack. He and Seth Armstrong argue with some of the Woolpack's younger customers over the use of the Domino table and the old tap room which has recently been cleared out. In order to get rid of the Youngsters, Wilf and Seth lace their drinks with vodka in order to get them drunk and rowdy so they will be banned, which works until landlord Amos Brearly finds out and bars Seth, Wilf and their friends from the tap room.
John Henderson	19 June	Michael Browning	John arrives at Home Farm on behalf of the Demdale Hunt to inspect the place as a potential location for their next hunt. John dislikes the trout prepared by house Dolly Skilbeck and prepared by Alan Turner, and is unimpressed when Dolly's seven-year-old son Samuel frequently interrupts him when John tries to talk about the hunt with Frank Tate. This causes Frank's wife, Kim to kick off at Dolly who promptly quits her job.
Terry Prince	24–26 June	John Hallam (2 episodes)	Terry is a friend of Frank Tate. He and some Frank's other friends arrive at Home Farm and begin drinking and generally getting rowdy. The group go out and end up spending the night in a hotel. Frank wakes up hungover and as a result misses his daughter, Zoe's University Graduation in Edinburgh. The following year, Frank asks Terry to stage a hijack one of the vans from Tate Haulage to teach his son Chris a lesson but when Frank tells Terry to call the job off, the message is not received and Chris is attacked.
Ken Trafford	21 August–25 October	Adam Bareham (3 episodes)	Trafford represents Kate Sugden when she is arrested for running over Pete Whiteley and successfully gets her bail. Trafford then puts Kate in contact with Harriet Buchan, a barrister.
Sally Graves	27 September–9 October	Deborah Fairfax (2 episodes)	Sally is a customer at Martin Bennett's veterinarian practice insistent that he dog, Clement is unwell even after Zoe Tate explains that Clement is fine. Two weeks later, Sally returns and claims that Clement is dying. Martin tells Zoe that Sally is a sick woman who is always visiting vets and claiming that her animal is dying.
Harriet Buchan	9–25 October	Sheila Grier (2 episodes)	Harriet is Kate Sugden's barrister who defends her when she is charged with manslaughter after killing Pete Whiteley. Harriet puts Kate through her paces by replicating some of the questioning that may arise in court. Kate feels she has a chance but confides in her husband, Joe that she is scared. Two weeks later on the day of the trial, Harriet is able to argue Kate's clean 20-year driving licence and calls Reverend Tony Charlton to the stand who testifies that Kate has done work for the church. In spite of Harriet's best efforts, Kate is sentenced to two years' imprisonment and fined £800.
