= Rachel Hughes =

Fictional character from Emmerdale

- Emmerdale character
- Portrayed by: Glenda McKay
- Duration: 1988–1999
- First appearance: 7 September 1988
- Last appearance: 12 May 1999
- Introduced by: Stuart Doughty
In-universe information
- Occupation: Student; Bartender; Receptionist; School secretary
- Father: David Hughes
- Mother: Kate Sugden
- Stepfather: Joe Sugden
- Brothers: Mark Hughes
- Husband: Chris Tate (1995–1997)
- Sons: Joe Tate
- Grandsons: William Tate
- Grandfathers: Eddie Hammond

Rachel Hughes is a fictional character from the British television soap opera Emmerdale, portrayed by Glenda McKay. She made her first appearance during the episode broadcast on 7 September 1988 and departed following the character's death on 12 May 1999.

== Creation and casting ==
In 1988, Emmerdale was networked for the first time, which meant the episodes were shown at the same time in all ITV regions. This made publicising the serial easier, as national newspapers had been reluctant to print articles about the storylines up to that point. The show also acquired new series producer Stuart Doughty, who wanted the show to feel more up to date. He introduced Sarah Connolly (Madeleine Howard) and the Hughes family in September 1988 to "shake up the mix and to act as identification figures" for newer viewers. Kate Hughes (Sally Knyvette) and her teenage children were "outsiders" and not used to country life, which challenged established regulars Jack Sugden (Clive Hornby) and Joe Sugden (Frazer Hines). Glenda McKay was cast as Rachel when she was 17. Her brother Craig McKay was cast as Rachel's brother Mark Hughes. When Craig was auditioning for the part, McKay wrote to the producers and asked if they would consider her for the role of Rachel. She told Angela Hagan of the Daily Mirror that she "couldn't believe it" when she was later offered an audition, which led to her casting. By October 1997, McKay had become the serial's second longest-serving actress. She recalled that the public's perception of Emmerdale had changed for the better during her time in the show, saying "When I was younger, I used to feel as if I had to apologise for being in it. Kids used to make animal noises at me in the street. Now they will shout out, Yes, Emmerdale, ace!"

== Development ==
=== Characterisation and early storylines ===
Writer Anthony Hayward described Rachel as "an awkward teenager" who was interested in animal rights. A sixth-form pupil upon her introduction to the serial, Rachel was often seen studying for her A-levels. She takes a year out before going to university and finds employment as a receptionist at Tate Haulage. McKay told Hayward that she and Rachel were much more in parallel and shared a lot of similarities when she was younger, such as boyfriend troubles. But as she got older, McKay felt that she was just coming to work and playing the character. She said "Both of us have changed. Rachel is quite glamorous these days".

Writers soon scripted an affair between Rachel and married character Pete Whiteley (Jim Millea). She loses her virginity to him on her eighteenth birthday. McKay said it was a risqué storyline and "quite steamy stuff" for "Emmerdale" at the time. Lance Parkin, author of 30 Years of Emmerdale, noted that Rachel falls "passionately in love" with Pete, so she is "devastated" when he leaves the village with his wife, ending the affair. The following year, Pete was reintroduced and he and Rachel resume their affair, until Kate accidentally hits Pete with her car, killing him. Rachel is involved in a love triangle with Michael Feldmann (Matthew Vaughan), to whom she becomes engaged, and university student Jayesh Parmar (John Leary). McKay admitted that the storyline was very confusing because the actors were not given any long-term plans and learned what was going to happen when the scripts arrived, so in one episode her character is flirting with Michael, then Jayesh, then she is telling one of them to get lost. McKay said "It's keeping me on my toes because my character seems to have become very much more indecisive than she used to be." McKay believed Rachel had always liked Michael and that she would not lose the feelings for him even though she moved on. She also said Rachel "obviously thinks the world of Jayesh" even if she still cares for Michael.

Rachel's brother Mark was killed off in the plane disaster storyline in 1993. McKay felt enormous guilt that her real brother was written out, as he did not want to leave and she was continuing the job he wanted to do.

=== Marriage to Chris Tate ===
Following the plane disaster, Rachel embarks on an affair with Chris Tate (Peter Amory), whose marriage to Kathy Tate (Malandra Burrows) has suffered in the wake of his paralysis. Amory told Inside Soap's Victoria Ross that Chris has not had any love from Kathy for a while, and Rachel is the only person who has paid him any attention, as well as seemingly understanding how he feels about the injuries he suffered. Amory also explained that Rachel is able to show Chris that he is not the only one with problems, which helps to stop him from wallowing in self pity. He pointed out that her brother died in the plane disaster, Michael left the village and Joe relocated to Spain, leaving her alone. Amory said, "Rachel's never been afraid to speak her mind which is a great ego boost for him because she doesn't treat him with kid gloves. He knows that it's not pity she feels for him. She likes him for who he is and sees him as a real friend and soulmate."

During episodes airing in early 1995, Rachel discovers she is pregnant. McKay said the news is "a bit of a shock" to the couple, and joked that her character's pregnancy was immaculate conception, as Chris had been told that he could not father a child because of his injuries from the plane crash. She also thought this was the reason that the pair did not use contraception. Rachel is seen struggling to accept the news and McKay told Ross: "Rachel talks to Sarah Sugden about the problems of raising children, especially when the father is disabled, and it's not long before she has her rose-coloured spectacles well and truly shattered." Kathy also learns of Chris and Rachel's affair, leading to a physical altercation between the two women. McKay was proud of the scenes, calling it "a real fight" and said Rachel does not stand a chance against Kathy, who acts like The Incredible Hulk.

The birth of Rachel and Chris's son coincided with the off-screen death of Rachel's former stepfather Joe Sugden. McKay explained that Kathy decides that she should be the one to break the news to Rachel, as she is genuinely concerned about how upset Rachel will be. Rachel faints upon hearing the news of Joe's death, which then causes her to go into labour six weeks early. McKay said Rachel is "so terrified" that she asks Kathy to go to the hospital with her. McKay recalled that the birth was the most difficult thing she had to act out during her time in the show. She also found her character's labour scenes put her off having her own children.

Rachel and Chris marry, but their marriage is soon tested by Chris's desire for another child. Amory explained that after being written out of his father's will and with a half-sibling on the way, Chris feels insecure about his rights to the Tate family fortune. The idea of having another child comes to Chris at a drunken dinner party, but Rachel dismisses it as "a flippant comment". Amory thought that the idea was also a way for Chris to keep Rachel at home. He said "He doesn't like the fact that Rachel's so independent and I do think it's a way of making sure she's got enough to do without going down to the Woolpack or going on her girly nights out." Amory continued saying that Chris admires her independence, but feels that she exercises it too strongly and he would rather that she stay at home, while he goes out to work. Amory defended his character's decision to have another child, as he felt that it would be nice if their son was not an only child. Amory added that he was not sure why Rachel married Chris, saying "I think you'd have to be fairly thick-skinned or stupid to marry him."

=== Graham Clark and departure ===
In 1999, Rachel was given a new love interest in the form of teacher Graham Clark (Kevin Pallister), beginning a storyline focusing on coercion and manipulation. The plot also leads to Rachel's departure from the show. Graham is initially presented as the ideal boyfriend, until he throws away Rachel's clothes and forces her to undergo a makeover. McKay said "Although Rachel has always been super strong and independent, this guy seems to be taking over her life." She called Graham "clever" for being able to turn things around and get Rachel to believe that he is simply over protective because his first wife died. She also thought that Rachel does not question or doubt his intentions because everyone in the village is telling her that she is lucky to have such a caring boyfriend. As Graham's obsession with Rachel continues, he tries to persuade her to quit her job and then plants drugs in her bag in order to get her fired. Pallister explained to Inside Soap's Tricia Martin "Graham thinks a woman's place is in the home. He's the kind of person who needs to be in control of everything." He reckoned that Graham did love Rachel, but the "control freak" in him takes over and planting the drugs was a means to an end.

McKay decided to leave Emmerdale as she wanted to pursue new acting and presenting roles. She stated "I've been at Emmerdale for 11 years so it is a big change, but there comes a time when you have to go. I have other strings to my bow, and now seems like the right time to put them to the test." McKay also grew to dislike her character during her storyline with Graham Clark. She told the Daily Record's Vicky Spavin: "Graham made her feel so insecure that, in a way, she had done all she could. I just wish she'd punched him! Still, she was a challenge to play." McKay filmed her final scenes in April and her exit aired on 12 May 1999. Producers decided to kill Rachel off and McKay was happy to have a dramatic final storyline to play out.

== Storylines ==
Rachel arrives in Beckindale with her mother Kate and brother Mark, after her parents divorce. Her mother feuds with Joe Sugden after he shoots and kills the family dog because it was bothering his sheep. However, Joe and Kate fall in love and marry. Rachel is more accepting of her mother's new relationship, while Mark wants their parents to reconcile. Rachel has an affair with married man Pete Whiteley on her 18th birthday. Pete ends it when Rachel's father David (Martyn Whitby) beats him up in the Woolpack car park after learning of the affair. Pete's wife, Lynn (Fionnuala Ellwood), becomes pregnant and they move away from the village. Pete later returns and dates Rachel again until he is accidentally run over and killed by Rachel's mother. Lynn gets revenge on Rachel by embarking on a relationship with Rachel's former stepfather, Joe. Mark is killed when a plane crashes and explodes over Beckindale. Rachel gives Chris Tate swimming lessons after he suffers injuries in the disaster and has to use a wheelchair. They have an affair, which Chris's wife Kathy Tate discovers when she sees them kissing on her wedding anniversary. She attacks Rachel, banging her head against a wall.

Rachel discovers that she is pregnant with Chris's baby and gives birth to their son, Joseph Mark Tate, on the same day her former stepfather Joe dies. Kathy helps Rachel when she goes into labour and stays with her on the journey to the hospital, leading to the two women becoming best friends. Rachel also names Kathy as Joseph's godmother. Rachel and Chris marry with Jack and his wife, Sarah, as witnesses. Wanting another child, Chris undergoes fertility treatment, but Rachel secretly takes the pill. Chris and Rachel break up after Chris betrays Rachel by stealing private information from her work file. Rachel is granted custody of Joseph. Rachel learns that her mother has died of a brain haemorrhage. She then embarks on an affair with Jack, after he comforts her and attends Kate's funeral with her. Jack has no intention of breaking up his marriage and returns to his wife.

Rachel dates schoolteacher Graham Clark, who exerts control over her. He gets her fired from her job by planting drugs in her bag. He also gets her to dye her hair and dress differently. Rachel soon discovers that she now looks like Graham's late wife, Rebecca. Rachel decides to end the relationship and tries to break up with Graham during a picnic. When Graham attempts to force himself on her, Rachel tries to run from him, but he corners her on a clifftop. Rachel realises that Graham killed his wife and confronts him, leading him to push her off the cliff to her death. Graham returns to the village and pretends that Rachel is missing. The villagers search for her and Graham watches on as Jack finds Rachel's body.

== Reception ==
The character earned a reputation as "Emmerdale's scarlet woman" and a "husband-snatcher" due to her various affairs with married men. During a feature on the "wild women" of Emmerdale, a writer for the Daily Mirror said "Not the most obvious of scarlet women, given those jumpers and that helmet hairdo, Rachel did not let that stop her having steamy affairs with some unlikely locals. Let's face it, married farmer Jack Sugden is no one's idea of a sex magnet, and neither is the morose Chris Tate, Kathy's ex- husband. She also bedded Steve Marchant, who moved on to marry Kim. All her loves ended badly, none more so than her final fling with the psychotic Graham who threw her off a cliff then threw himself at Kathy's feet." Daniel Kilkelly of Digital Spy branded Rachel a "tragic" character and called her exit from the show "explosive", adding "the curse of the Tates had struck again..." In May 1993, TVTimes featured a story about their readers' beliefs that too much sex was featured on television. In their soap opera section, they stated "many people worry about sex in early-evening soaps." They included a viewer complaint from a pensioner that was unhappy that Emmerdale had sexualised Rachel via her romantic storylines.

== Bibliography ==
- Hayward, Anthony (1991). The Who's Who of Soap Operas. Guinness Publishing. ISBN 978-0-85112-966-2.
- Hayward, Anthony (1997). The Emmerdale Companion. Orion Media. ISBN 978-0-7528-1776-7.
- Parkin, Lance (2002). 30 Years of Emmerdale. Granada Media Group. ISBN 978-0-233-05068-3.
