= List of Emmerdale characters introduced in 1989 =

The following is a list of characters that first appeared in the British soap opera Emmerdale in 1989, by order of first appearance. Pete and Lynn Whiteley, played by Jim Millea and Fionnuala Ellwood, were the first characters introduced in January. They were followed a month later by Pete's grandfather, Bill, portrayed by Teddy Turner. In March, Martyn Whitby took on the role of Kate Sugden's ex-husband David Hughes. In November, following the change of series title from Emmerdale Farm to Emmerdale, a new family was introduced; the Tates, with father and son Frank (Norman Bowler) and Chris (Peter Amory), followed by Frank's respective wife and daughter, Kim (Claire King) and Zoe (Leah Bracknell) in December.

== Pete Whiteley ==
Pete Whiteley
- Emmerdale character
- Portrayed by: Jim Millea
- Duration: 1989–1990
- First appearance: 18 January 1989
- Last appearance: 16 August 1990
- Introduced by: Stuart Doughty
In-universe information
- Other names: Peter William Whiteley
- Wife: Lynn Whiteley (until 1990)
- Sons: Peter Whiteley
- Grandfathers: Bill Whiteley

Pete Whiteley appeared from 1989 to 1990. Pete was the grandson of Bill Whiteley and first appeared when Bill bought his new home and invited his family to live with him. Shortly after arriving in the village Pete embarked on an affair with local teenager Rachel Hughes which was exposed at his wife Lynn's New Year party. Lynn did not split up with Pete, however, as she discovered she was pregnant and believed her child needed its father. Despite this, Pete still had a feelings for Rachel and wanted to continue the affair but Rachel eventually decided to end it. Pete took the rejection badly and began drinking heavily. One night, fearing Pete would try to drive home drunk, Rachel stole his car keys. Faced with the prospect of having to walk home, Pete stumbled into the middle of the road and was run over and killed by Rachel's mother, Kate Sugden in her car. Lynn gave birth to her and Pete's son, Peter Jr. on the day of his funeral.

== Lynn Whiteley ==
Lynn Whiteley
- Emmerdale character
- Portrayed by: Fionnuala Ellwood
- Duration: 1989–1994
- First appearance: 18 January 1989
- Last appearance: 4 August 1994
- Introduced by: Stuart Doughty
In-universe information
- Husband: Pete Whiteley (until 1990)
- Sons: Peter Whiteley

Lynn Whiteley appeared for a period of five years between 1989 and 1994. Lynn moved in with her grandfather-in-law, Bill, in 1989 at his new farm. Her husband, Pete, then had an affair with teenager Rachel Hughes, which was exposed at Lynn's New Year party. Lynn did not leave Pete, as she discovered she was pregnant and believed that her child needed its father. After Pete was killed in a hit-and-run accident by Rachel's mother, Kate Sugden, Lynn gave birth to their son, Peter, on the same day as Pete's funeral. Lynn continued to live at Whiteley's Farm with Peter and Bill and carried on after Bill died in July 1991. She continued feuding with Rachel over her affair with Pete, culminating in Rachel pouring a drink over her in The Woolpack. In December 1993 Lynn went for a drink in The Woolpack and left Peter with a babysitter when the Plane Crash occurred. She suffered a minor head injury but was otherwise unscathed, and returned home to discover Whiteley's Farm had been destroyed. Peter was safe, as the babysitter had come outside with him when the crash occurred. In the aftermath of the crash Lynn continued to make herself unpopular with the other villagers. Lynn developed an attraction to Jack Sugden and was slapped by Jack's wife, Sarah, when she found out. She also had a brief relationship with Jack's brother, Joe Sugden, Rachel's former stepfather, in order to get revenge for Rachel's affair with Pete. Lynn then slept with a news reporter and gave him information about the plane crash. After one final showdown with Rachel, Lynn left the village to live in Australia with an Australian called Sven Olsen in August 1994. None of the other villagers was unhappy to see her go and none missed her.

== Bill Whiteley ==
Bill Whiteley
- Emmerdale character
- Portrayed by: Teddy Turner
- Duration: 1989–1990
- First appearance: 8 February 1989
- Last appearance: 13 September 1990
- Introduced by: Stuart Doughty
In-universe information
- Other names: William Whiteley
- Grandsons: Pete Whiteley
- Other relatives: Peter Whiteley

Bill Whiteley was first seen after his house was auctioned off. He received a large sum of money for the house as a result of a high interest rate. After buying himself a new farm, which he renamed "Whiteley's Farm", Bill invited his grandson Pete and his wife Lynn to live with him. Bill was very morbid and obsessed with death, so much so that Ernie Shuttleworth, owner of the Malt Shovel barred him for depressing customers. Bill had the same effect on customers at the Woolpack. He believed that his family wouldn't be able to afford a decent coffin so he got himself one for Christmas. Bill was devastated when Pete was killed in a hit-and-run accident by Kate Sugden. At Pete's funeral, Bill angrily berated Kate's husband Joe after he offered to help the family. Following the birth of his great-grandson Peter, Bill let Lynn and Peter carry on living with him. Bill was last seen when Kate visited him to apologize for causing Pete's death but he tells that no apology could bring his grandson back. Bill died off-screen in July 1991 of natural causes.

== David Hughes ==
David Hughes
- Emmerdale character
- Portrayed by: Martyn Whitby
- Duration: 1989–1990
- First appearance: 29 March 1989
- Last appearance: 22 November 1990
- Introduced by: Stuart Doughty
In-universe information
- Wife: Kate Hammond (1968-1986)
- Sons: Mark Hughes
- Daughters: Rachel Hughes
- Grandsons: Joseph Tate

David Hughes, played by Martyn Whitby, made his first appearance on 29 March 1989 and departed on 22 November 1990. David is the ex-husband of Kate Hughes (Sally Knyvette) and the father of their children Mark (Craig McKay) and Rachel (Glenda McKay). David appears in the village prior to Kate's wedding to Joe Sugden (Frazer Hines) and his presence causes friction. In spite of this, Kate and Joe marry and David leaves. However, he returns several months later and intends to settle in Hotten near the village to become closer to his children, which angers Joe. During this time, David learns of Rachel's affair with Pete Whiteley (Jim Millea) and agrees to keep quiet but when he sees Rachel and Pete kissing, he attacks Pete.

David then tells Kate of the affair and schemes to be closer to her by inviting her and the children to spend Christmas with him, then by buying Kate a new dress as a present. Joe, incensed, attempts to attack David but is overpowered. David then becomes obsessed with winning Kate back, which culminates in him menacing her and Joe with Alan Turner's (Richard Thorp) shotgun. However, Kate calls David's bluff and he backs down and flees the village. David returns in November and hides out at the Mill, and is aided by Mark and Rachel. After a failed attempt to visit Kate who is now incarcerated for running over Pete, David returns and apologises to Joe for attempting to shoot him and thanks him for not calling the police. Mark then urges David to give himself up, which he agrees to but when Mark returns with Rachel to drive him to the police station, David is gone and has left a note.

== Eddie Hammond ==
Eddie Hammond
- Emmerdale character
- Portrayed by: Geoffrey Banks
- First appearance: 12 April 1989
- Last appearance: 28 September 1989
- Introduced by: Stuart Doughty
In-universe information
- Daughters: Kate Hammond
- Grandsons: Mark Hughes
- Granddaughters: Rachel Hughes
- Other relatives: Joseph Tate

Eddie Hammond, portrayed by Geoffrey Banks, is the father of Kate Hughes (Sally Knyvette) who attends her wedding to Joe Sugden (Frazer Hines). He initially appears for two episodes in April 1989 and in those is mistakenly credited as Eddie Hughes. He returns in September 1989 to visit Kate. In 1991, after Kate is paroled from prison for the hit and run of Pete Whiteley (Jim Millea) that resulted in his death, she goes to live with Eddie instead of returning to Beckindale.

Since his last appearance, Eddie has not appeared at his grandson Mark Hughes' (Craig McKay) funeral in 1994, great-grandson Joseph Tate's (Oliver Young) christening in 1995 or the funerals of Kate in 1997 or Rachel Hughes (Glenda McKay) in 1999, so it is unknown whether Eddie is alive or not.

== Louise Merrick ==
Louise Merrick
- Emmerdale character
- Portrayed by: Linzi McGuire
- First appearance: 3 May 1989
- Last appearance: 4 May 1989
- Introduced by: Stuart Doughty
In-universe information
- Father: Andy Longthorn
- Mother: Sandie Merrick
- Grandfathers: Tom Merrick
- Grandmothers: Pat Sugden
- Uncles: Jackie Merrick; Tommy Merrick; Robert Sugden
- First cousins: Sebastian White
- Other relatives: Janie Blakey

Louise Merrick, portrayed by Linzi McGuire, is the daughter of Sandie Merrick (Jane Hutcheson) and Andy Longthorn (Mark Botham). She was born in Aberdeen in November 1983 when Sandie was living with her father, Tom Merrick (Edward Peel) after she fell out with her mother, Pat Sugden (Helen Weir), over her pregnancy. When Louise was born her mother was seventeen and her father was nineteen. When Sandie decided to return to Beckindale, she put Louise up for adoption to Pat's dismay as she had gotten used to the idea of being a grandmother. In 1989, Louise was returned to Sandie's care and went to live with her and her father after leaving Beckindale for good this time.

== Others ==
Character	Date(s)	Actor	Circumstances
Tony Barclay	22 February–26 April	Alun Lewis	Tony is a brief love interest of Sandie Merrick.
Ted Sharp	24 May–10 August	Andy Rasleigh	Ted takes an interest in Dolly Skilbeck, when she is grieving for her recently deceased lover Steven Fuller. However, Dolly does not feel as strong about Ted as he does about her. Ted is enraged at being rejected and kidnaps Dolly. Worried that Dolly may inform the police, he initially refuses to let her go but relents when she tells him she won't tell anyone which, she does not. Ted then flees the village.
Alice Wood	3 October–9 November	Olivia Jardith	Alice is the mother of Caroline Bates who briefly visits from Scarborough, much to the irritation of Alan Turner. At the end of her visit, Caroline leaves with her to look after her. In 1991, Alice's Grandson Nick and his girlfriend Elsa Feldmann have a daughter and name her after Alice. In 1994, Caroline receives a phone that call that Alice Sr. has died.
Sid Flower	30 November–5 December	Patrick Durkin	Sid is the manager of a Chip Shop in Hotten who employs Jack Sugden. Sid is surly, miserable and often rude to his employees, including Donna, a girl who works there. Jack quickly tires of Sid's callous attitude towards Donna when she burns herself with some oil and stands up to Sid. Sid threatens to fire Jack, who resigns but not before pouring baked beans all over Sid much to the amusement of Donna and the customers. As Jack leaves, Sid tells Donna to stop him but she tells Sid to stop Jack himself..
Donna	30 November–5 December	Sue McCormick	
