= Joe Sugden =

Fictional character from Emmerdale

- Emmerdale character
- Portrayed by: Frazer Hines
- Duration: 1972–1994
- First appearance: 16 October 1972
- Last appearance: 11 August 1994
- Created by: Kevin Laffan
- Introduced by: David Goddard (1972); Richard Handford (1984)
In-universe information
- Occupation: Farmer
- Family: Sugden
- Father: Jacob Sugden
- Mother: Annie Sugden
- Brothers: Jack Sugden
- Sisters: Peggy Skilbeck
- Wife: Christine Sharp (1974–1976); Kate Hughes (1989–1991)
- Stepsons: Mark Hughes
- Stepdaughters: Rachel Hughes
- Grandfathers: Joseph Sugden; Sam Pearson
- Grandmothers: Margaret Sugden; Grace Pearson
- Uncles: Edward Sugden
- Nephews: Jackie Merrick; Sam Skilbeck; Robert Sugden; Andy Sugden; John Sugden
- Nieces: Sally Skilbeck; Victoria Sugden

Joseph "Joe" Sugden is a fictional character from the British television soap opera Emmerdale, played by Frazer Hines. He first appeared on-screen during the soap's first episode broadcast 16 October 1972 and remained in the programme until 1983. After a brief return in the following year, Hines reprised his role on a permanent basis in 1986, a landmark year for the show under Richard Handford. He made his last appearance in August 1994, and subsequently died off-screen the following year.

== Development ==
Joe is a farmer as was his father. When Emmerdale began it depicted actual farm life. Rather than act out tasks, Hines learned to dip sheep and milk cows.

Joe is involved in a relationship with Christine Sharp (Angela Cheyne). They married during the episode broadcast on 10 September 1974. The duo overcome a series of problems before marrying and Christine has the wedding day "she'd always dreamed of". To commemorate the event TVTimes featured a promotional souvenir photograph for readers prior to the episode's airdate.

In August 1994, Hines, along with Madeleine Howard (Sarah Sugden) and Fionnuala Ellwood (Lynn Whiteley), departed the serial. At the time Hines commented "We've all been there for a while and just decided it was time to move on." He later stated that he was ready for a change and had wanted to pursue more comedy for a while. On-screen, Joe moves to Spain to be with his mother.

== Storylines ==
Joe was born on 31 May 1949, named after his paternal grandfather, and is the youngest child of Jacob and Annie Sugden (Sheila Mercier). After Jacob dies, the family learn that he has left the farm to his estranged son, Jack Sugden, who divides it between the family.

After a failed attempt at courting Marian Wilks (Gail Harrison), Joe starts dating Christine Sharp and they soon marry but separate when Christine decides she does not want to be a farmer's wife. Christine returns the following year to reconcile but Joe wants a divorce and she leaves for good. Joe's next relationship is with Kathy Gimbel (Polly Hemingway), who moves in with him. Their relationship is a huge talking point in the village as Kathy is separated from her husband, Kenny. When Kathy's father, Jim (John Atkinson) shoots himself, Kathy leaves Joe to live with her mother, Freda (Mary Henry).

Joe gets a job working for NY estates and gets jobs for his nephew Jackie Merrick (Ian Sharrock) and Jackie's half-sister Sandie (Jane Hutcheson). Joe develops feelings for vicar's daughter Barbara Peters (Rosie Kerslake) in 1983 but is rejected and moves to France for several years but briefly returns for the funeral of his grandfather, Sam Pearson (Toke Townley), in November 1984. In 1986, Joe returns permanently and becomes regional manager for NY Estates. During this time, he has a brief relationship with Karen Moore (Annie Hulley), who had previously had an affair with Jack, but Karen ends the relationship.

Joe meets divorcee Kate Hughes (Sally Knyvette), and her two teenage children, Rachel (Glenda McKay) and Mark Hughes (Craig McKay). Initially Kate and Joe argue after he shoots her dog for bothering his sheep but they eventually fall in love. Joe proposes, but with Mark and Rachel opposed and wanting Kate to reconcile with their father, David (Martyn Whitby), Joe becomes worried. They do marry and Kate's children eventually come round to their mother's new marriage. Kate accidentally runs over Pete Whiteley – a married man who had had an affair with Rachel – whilst drunk, killing him. She is jailed for two years, but released after a year. Joe and Kate attempt to make their marriage work, but Kate ultimately feels too big a distance has grown between them, so tells Joe the marriage is over and returns to Sheffield. Rachel and Mark decide to stay and Joe forms a closer relationship with them. Joe later has a controversial relationship with Pete's widow, Lynn, but suspects her main motive is to upset Rachel, so breaks things off. He also becomes attracted to Kim Tate (Claire King), but she remains faithful to husband Frank, and the two ultimately remain just good friends, even after Kim and Frank separate.

Joe and Mark argue over a vacuum cleaner that needs returning so Mark goes to the Whiteley Farm when a large section of an Eastern European Airjet comes down, knocking down a wall which falls on Mark, killing him. Joe, his mother, Annie, and her new husband, Leonard Kempinski (Bernard Archard), are also hit when another part of the plane hits his car. Joe breaks a leg, Annie is left comatose and Leonard is killed. When Joe learns of Mark's death, he becomes very depressed and blames himself. Vic Windsor later finds Joe with a shotgun, contemplating suicide. Jack is eventually able to talk him out of it.

After Joe saves Dave Glover (Ian Kelsey) from being run over by a car, Jack and Rachel persuade him to go to spend time with Annie in Spain. The following year, news reaches Emmerdale that Joe has died in a car crash. Annie and Amos Brearly (Ronald Magill) return to the village for his funeral.

In February 2026, Robert finds the old Emmerdale Farm stone in Annie's field and mentions to Aaron Dingle that Joe touched that stone many times over the years.

== Reception ==
The character was selected as one of the "top 100 British soap characters" by industry experts for a poll to be run by What's on TV, with readers able to vote for their favourite character to discover "Who is Soap's greatest Legend?" In 1998, writers from Inside Soap published an article about the top ten characters they wanted to return to soap. Joe was featured and they opined that "his gentle charm and Yorkshire grit made him irresistible to a seemingly endless stream of women."
