= Andy Sugden =

Fictional character from Emmerdale

- Emmerdale character
- Portrayed by: Kelvin Fletcher
- Duration: 1996–2016
- First appearance: 4 July 1996
- Last appearance: 16 August 2016
- Introduced by: Mervyn Watson
In-universe information
- Other names: Andy Hopwood
- Occupation: Farmer; Groundsman
- Family: Sugden
- Father: Billy Hopwood
- Mother: Trisha Hopwood
- Adoptive father: Jack Sugden
- Adoptive mother: Sarah Sugden
- Stepmother: Diane Sugden
- Brothers: Robert Sugden (adoptive)
- Sisters: Victoria Sugden (adoptive)
- Half-brothers: Daz Eden
- Wife: Katie Sugden (2004–2007, 2014–2015); Jo Stiles (2008–2009)
- Sons: Jack Sugden
- Daughters: Sarah Sugden
- Granddaughters: Leyla Sugden (adoptive)
- Grandfathers: Jacob Sugden (adoptive)
- Grandmothers: Granny Hopwood; Annie Sugden (adoptive)
- Nephews: Sebastian White (adoptive); Harry Sugden (adoptive)

Andy Sugden (also Hopwood) is a fictional character from the British ITV soap opera, Emmerdale, played by Kelvin Fletcher. He made his first on-screen appearance during the episode first broadcast in the United Kingdom on 4 July 1996. Andy was initially introduced as the foster son of Jack Sugden (Clive Hornby) and Sarah Sugden (Alyson Spiro), before formally being adopted into the Sugden family.

Appearing for 20 years, Andy emerged as one of the longest-serving characters in the programme's history. Across his tenure, his major storylines included accidentally causing the death of Sarah in a barn fire, a bitter feud with his adoptive brother Robert (Karl Davies/Ryan Hawley) and being framed for attempted murder which culminates in him fleeing the village. He was twice married to Katie Addyman (Sammy Winward), and engaged in domestic abuse towards his second wife Jo Stiles (Roxanne Pallet). A brief fling with Debbie Dingle (Charley Webb) resulted in the birth of his daughter Sarah (Sophia Amber Moore), before their son Jack (Louis Webster/Seth Ball) is born to create a bone marrow donor for Sarah after she is diagnosed with fanconi anaemia.

Fletcher has received widespread critical acclaim for his performance as Andy, winning multiple awards and nominations for his role. Particularly, the character's more emotive and challenging storylines have earned Fletcher praise for his portrayal whereas Andy was considered one of the most popular soap opera characters throughout his tenure. Fletcher stepped down from the role to pursue new challenges and his final scenes aired on 16 August 2016.

== Creation and casting ==
Fletcher successfully auditioned for the role of Andy Hopwood, described as a young tearaway and friend of established character Robert Sugden (Christopher Smith). The character was initially scripted to appear in three episodes though Fletcher impressed producers with his performance and was offered a long-term contract. Fletcher had previously auditioned for the role of Jamie Armstrong in fellow ITV soap opera Coronation Street though lost out to Joe Gilgun before being invited to audition for Emmerdale a year later. Reflecting on this during his podcast Off Script, Fletcher said: "I once auditioned for Corrie. It was actually for a little boy called Jamie who Jack Duckworth took under his wing, and I was down to the last two with Joe Gilgun. He obviously got the role... A year later I ended up in Emmerdale and the rest is history".

== Storylines ==
Andy arrives in Emmerdale and is fostered by Jack (Clive Hornby) and Sarah Sugden (Alyson Spiro), but finds it difficult to settle with the Sugden family. While on-site at a quarry, his foot lodges on a rock and gets trapped, forcing Jack to rescue him. When his father, Billy Hopwood (David Crellin), visits Emmerdale, Andy is persuaded to move into a caravan with him and disown the Sugdens. Billy breaks his promise to change and returns to committing petty crimes, up to the point where he robs the local post office and ends up killing its owner – Vic Windsor (Alun Lewis). In light of Vic's death and the post office incident, Billy is arrested and Andy moves back in with the Sugdens.

By then, Andy has grown close with his Jack and Sarah's young son Robert (Christopher Smith). This continues as the pair grow concerned when Jack and Sarah begin arguing over the farm. Sarah is annoyed with Jack for keeping Andy and off school to work on the farm. The subsequent discovery that Sarah is having an affair with Richie Carter (Glenn Lamont) causes the family to break up. Jack is awarded custody of Robert while Sarah is awarded custody of Robert's little sister Victoria (Hannah Midgley). Andy decides to stay with Jack. When the farm faces financial ruin, Andy decides to set fire to the barn for the insurance payout. However, Sarah and Richie are in the barn; the fire ends up killing Sarah and putting Richie in hospital. Richie blames Jack for the fire, but withdraws his statement to protect Andy.

Andy soon begins dating Katie Addyman (Sammy Winward), and goes to a nightclub with her along with other local residents; Eve Jenson (Raine Davison), Marc Reynolds (Anthony Lewis), Ollie Reynolds (Vicky Binns), and Donna Windsor (Verity Rushworth). Also involved on the trip is Robert (now Karl Davies), who has now resented Andy after learning the truth about how their mother died. When the group miss the bus, they steal a car and accidentally kill their headteacher Barbara Strickland (Alex Hall) along the way back to the village. They attempt to cover up their crime and burn the car. After living with guilt, the group confess and everyone apart from Marc – who was driving – is given community service. Katie's father Brian (Martin Reeve) disapproves of Andy and resolves to split them up. They decide to have a baby in an attempt to change his mind, but when Brian learns that Katie is pregnant, he sends her to live with her mother. She returns and moves in with Andy, but has a miscarriage. Despite this, she and Andy start planning their wedding. Katie, however, feels neglected by Andy working long hours and turns to Robert for excitement. Their affair is discovered by Victoria, as well as Andy's half-brother Daz Eden. However, Andy refuses to believe Daz and puts him into care – while Robert threatens Victoria into staying quiet until Jack eventually discovers the affairs. When the marriage fails, Katie and Robert admit their affair. Andy tries to shoot Robert, but hits Jack by mistake. He initially disowns Andy, but the pair are eventually reconciled after recounting that Robert and Kate are to blame due to their betrayal.

When Das returns, Daz invites him and his friend Debbie Dingle (Charley Webb) to move in – needing the rent money. Debbie is attracted to Andy and loses her virginity to him. They start dating secretly, but then her family learn about this and Andy is confronted by Debbie's father Cain (Jeff Hordley) about the revelation. He later ends the relationship with Debbie after Cain threatens to lead Daz into criminal activities unless Andy leaves Debbie alone. Andy briefly dates Libby Charles (Ty Glaser) afterwards, but then discovers that Debbie has given birth to his baby – Sarah. He and Debbie soon break up, agreeing to keep in contact, but Debbie's decision to give Sarah to Emily Kirk (Kate McGregor) upsets Andy. Things get worse when Katie discover that Andy is Sarah's father. When she is involved in a car accident, Andy breaks up with Debbie to get back with her. They soon resume their relationship, annoying the Sugdens, but Andy later has an affair with Kate's new friend Jo Stiles (Roxanne Pallett). When he realises that he is using Jo to get revenge for Katie and Robert's affair, she manipulates him into continuing the affair. Emily returns Sarah to Andy; when Debbie finds out, she gives Andy custody.

Katie struggles to look after Sarah and start a stable business. Meanwhile, Andy sees Jo is better with Sarah and restarts their affair. Andy is about to tell Katie, when she announces that she could be pregnant; this turns out to be a false alarm. Andy tells her about his and Jo's affair. Katie throws them out but they return, since Andy is the leaseholder; Katie then moves out instead and moves her business to Home Farm. Andy and Katie subsequently separate.

Victoria (now played by Isabel Hodgins) begins looking for answers to the cause of Sarah Sr's death. In an attempt to force a confession, she douses the furniture in petrol and demands the truth; Andy confesses but a fire soon ignites. In January 2008 he is sentenced to three years imprisonment for manslaughter, Andy and Jo marry on 19 February 2008 in prison. Jack, Victoria, Daz, and Laurel are their guests and Ashley presides over the service. During Andy's incarceration, Debbie gets closer to Sarah and changes her mind about Jo adopting her. When Andy is released, he is angry to learn that Debbie has been allowed access and begins lashing out at Jo. The abuse continues for months and culminates in Andy getting seriously injured during a confrontation in a barn. Andy's family do not believe Jo initially but Daz and Victoria eventually see for themselves. After a suicide threat, Diane intervenes and arranges for Andy to get psychiatric treatment. Jo eventually leaves after Lee Naylor (Lewis Linford) helps her sell the farm equipment to fund her escape as Jo herself divorces from Andy off-screen in 2009.

Jack dies from a heart attack in Spain off-screen and leaves a letter for Diane to read at his funeral, in which he requests that Andy become the head of the family. Andy refuses at first but agrees after he sees Robert watching from a distance. When Robert sees Andy, he tells him that there was nothing for him in Emmerdale and leaves again.

Following Debbie's release from prison for allegedly murdering Shane Doyle, she requests more access to Sarah which Andy is unhappy about. Debbie warns him that she will not give up without a fight. During this time, Andy begins dating Maisie Wylde (Alice Coulthard), much to her family's chagrin. The hearing approaches and after realizing he cannot win, he withdraws his application for custody and Sarah goes to live with Debbie. Andy suffers a breakdown, letting the farm slide and is diagnosed with clinical depression. As time passes and he recovers, Andy works on rebuilding bridges with others in the village. He resumes work as a farmhand for the Barton family who take over the tenancy at Butlers and begins a relationship with Adele Allfrey (Tanya Vital) but this breaks down when Andy's temper and jealousy get the better of him; Adele leaves the village. Andy tries to reconcile with Katie and they sleep together on one occasion but Katie wants only to remain friends. Andy is jealous when Katie starts dating police officer Nick Henshall and is later accused of starting the fire that kills Viv and Terry Woods (Billy Hartman). It is later revealed Nick Henshall (Michael McKell) started the fire to try to frame Andy because of his previous crime. Henshall is arrested after kidnapping Katie and holds her hostage but she escapes when Henshall kills himself.

Sarah becomes ill and is diagnosed with Fanconi anaemia, a genetic disorder which could kill her without treatment. Debbie and Andy start looking for donors and find one but they pull out at the last moment. It is suggested to them that another baby or 'Saviour Sibling' could save their sick child. They apply for IVF but are turned down when the hospital learn that they are not a genuine couple as they need to be to qualify for funding for IVF. Debbie then suggests they try artificial insemination despite their partners Cameron Murray (Dominic Power) and Alicia Gallagher (Natalie Anderson) being unhappy. Their attempts are unsuccessful. Debbie believes the only way to conceive is for them to sleep together. Andy eventually agrees, angering Alicia who leaves Andy; Cameron still supports Debbie. They plan to sleep together but Debbie walks out, leaving Andy humiliated. Desperate to save her daughter, she changes her mind later and seduces him, but doesn't tell Cameron and Andy is confused by his feelings for Debbie. Jealous of Cameron, he turns up at Tug Ghyll at every opportunity. Debbie discovers she is pregnant and Andy is delighted, while Cameron feels left out but believes the baby was a result of artificial insemination. Cameron becomes angry that Andy won't leave Debbie alone, and warns him to stay away.

When John dies in a car accident after skidding on ice in Andy's Land Rover, Andy is guilt ridden after he finds out and thinks his car was the cause of the accident. John's widow, Moira Barton (Natalie J. Robb), assures him it was icy and that he is not to blame. Andy breaks down and tells Moira he feels like he has lost a brother after he and Moira talk about his and the Bartons' first meeting on the farm. Debbie tries to console Andy and, much to her surprise, he confesses his love for her but she breaks his heart by telling him that she loves Cameron. After Cameron warns Andy off, Andy reveals in a rage the baby was conceived naturally, not artificially. Following tests, Andy and Debbie discover the child is a match and they are delighted. Andy finds himself close to Katie again when he gives her advice after she leaves her ex-husband, Declan Macey (Jason Merrells). This leads to Declan and Andy fighting in The Woolpack. When Katie returns to fight for her marriage only a week later, Andy welcomes her back but warns Declan to start treating her the way she deserves.

Andy takes in Kerry Wyatt (Laura Norton) after her daughter Amy (Chelsea Halfpenny) throws her out. He confides in Kerry about his past and they bond over what they have been through. She cooks dinner for Andy and he tells her to stay another night as they kiss. Debbie goes into labour in October and gives birth to a boy and they name him Jack after Andy's late adoptive father. Andy and Amy share a kiss and Amy eventually tells Kerry. After a heated argument with Amy and her foster mother Val Pollard (Charlie Hardwick), Kerry slaps Amy, shocking Andy. Andy's relationship with Kerry comes to an end after Sarah and Jack are left in danger when Kerry gets drunk and drops a cigarette, starting a fire. Desperate to win Andy back, Kerry tells him she is pregnant but after a hit and run incident with Adam Barton (Adam Thomas) and Robbie Lawson (Jamie Shelton), she tells Andy that she was never pregnant but that she loves him. Angry at her behaviour, he rejects her and dates Amy for a while. However, that ends after she kidnaps the son she gave up for adoption and plans to leave the country with him. Eric, Val and Cain catch up with Amy and she is persuaded to return Kyle to his grandmother but chooses to stay on the ferry, fearing criminal prosecution. Val blames Andy for not being able to make Amy stay in the village.

In 2014, Andy starts a romantic relationship with his former stepsister, Bernice Blackstock (Samantha Giles) after helping her out setting up her beauty salon. They share a kiss and have sex. They begin to date and initially keep their romance a secret. At the opening night of Bernice's beauty salon, Bernice's father, Rodney Blackstock (Patrick Mower) along with Kerry, Nicola King (Nicola Wheeler) and Dan Spencer (Liam Fox) arrive at the salon and catch Andy and Bernice kissing. Later in 2014, Andy suffers an accident to his arm while working at Butlers Farm which is caused by Adam. Andy and Adam have a feud over the incident and over Andy's compensation money. Bernice does her best to support Andy through this. Katie accompanies Andy to a hospital appointment. When they arrive back from the hospital, Andy kisses Katie which Bernice witnesses from her window. Bernice is devastated and Andy later ends the relationship and reunites with Katie. Bernice returns a few weeks later after going to Australia, determined to win Andy back. Andy announces that he and Katie are back together and Andy's daughter, Sarah is pleased at their reunion. On Katie's birthday, Andy proposes to Katie which she accepts and they begin planning to remarry. In October 2014, Andy's adoptive brother and Katie's ex-boyfriend, whom Katie had an affair with during her previous marriage to Andy, Robert (now Ryan Hawley) returns to the village with his fiancée, Chrissie White (Louise Marwood), future father-in-law Lawrence White (John Bowe) and future stepson, Lachlan White (Thomas Atkinson). Katie disapproves of Robert's return and so does Andy as he hasn't forgiven him for the affair. Katie and Robert become embroiled in a feud with Robert trying to sabotage the wedding. They plan a Christmas wedding and eventually remarry on 25 December 2014. Andy's second marriage to Katie hits the rocks due to Katie's continual feud with Robert. Andy and Katie plan to buy Wylies Farm and restore it. Robert tries to sabotage the sale as his future father-in-law, Lawrence White owns the farm. Robert later sets fire to Katie and Andy's caravan which they are living in while the work gets done, in an act of revenge against Katie. Katie is also convinced that Robert is cheating on Chrissie with another woman. Robert cottons on to this and tries to lead Katie on by pretending it is Alicia. Katie confronts Robert over his "other woman" on numerous occasions in The Woolpack, which Robert denies.

In February 2015, Katie dies after finally discovering that Robert had been having an affair with a man, Aaron Livesy (Danny Miller). Robert does not want Chrissie to find out so he pushes Katie and she falls through rotting floorboards, breaking her neck and killing her. Andy is devastated by Katie's death and begins to spiral in to depression and tries to commit suicide. Robert comforts Andy and lets him move into Home Farm. While trying to move on from Katie, Andy begins a sexual relationship with Tracy Shankley (Amy Walsh), and also makes a move on ex-girlfriend, Bernice. He later ends his relationship with Tracey after realizing that the relationship isn't right, and eventually gets back on the straight and narrow. A few months later, Andy discovers one of Katie's phone bills. He checks it and realizes that the last number to call Katie was Aaron. He confronts Aaron and he finally admits that he has been having an affair with Robert and that Robert murdered Katie. Andy is furious and tries to convince everyone that Robert murdered her. Nobody believes Andy, and everyone believes that he is having a breakdown. He also phones the police but Robert denies everything and is released. Andy goes up to Butler's Farm to get hold of a gun. When he cannot find a gun he is angry. While trying to find the gun, Ross Barton (Michael Parr) walks in and asks Andy what is wrong. Andy admits that he is looking for a gun to go and shoot Robert as he murdered Katie. Ross reveals that he was also going to shoot his own brother Pete Barton (Anthony Quinlan) as he had left him for dead following a fight over Ross' affair with Debbie. Andy and Ross eventually go to Ross' house where they agree to shoot each other's brother therefore giving them an alibi with no evidence that either of them was involved in either of the shootings. Later that night, Ross shoots Robert on Andy's behalf, although he survives and Andy backs out of the plan to kill Pete.

Andy has sex with Bernice the night before her marriage to Lawrence. Bernice tells Andy she will call off the wedding if he assures her they can have a relationship. Andy turns her down, saying their fling was a mistake, while Bernice confesses everything to Lawrence. Having a change of heart, Andy goes in pursuit of Bernice to win her back, but arrives too late: he witnesses her marrying Lawrence. He later begins a relationship with Chrissie, Lawrence's daughter and brother Robert's estranged wife. After Bernice's marriage to Lawrence ends and Chrissie argues with him, Andy and Bernice once again sleep together. In July 2016, after Chrissie finds out about the fling, she plants the gun that her son, Lachlan, used to shoot Lawrence in Andy's car to frame him for the crime. He is arrested and charged with attempted murder. Chrissie also blackmails Andy's barrister, Rakesh Kotecha (Pasha Bocarie), into persuading Andy to plead guilty. To their shock, Andy pleads not guilty at his hearing. Immediately afterwards, while convening in Andy's cell, Rakesh, feeling sorry for Andy, tells him to escape. When the prison warden opens the cell door, Andy pushes Rakesh into the warden and flees. He returned to Home Farm, where he discovered the truth about Chrissie. He threatens to go to the police and tell them the truth, but, desperate to make Andy suffer, she cuts herself with a knife and tries to frame Andy with it. However, Andy went on the run again before the police could catch him. He is found by his brother Robert, who agrees to help him take down Chrissie. Andy decides he has to leave the village, and Robert procures a false passport for him under the name Brian Moore. He went to his late wife Katie's grave to say goodbye and Bernice later finds him and agrees to run away with him but changes her mind when she realises how much she has to lose. They emotionally say their last goodbyes to each other and Andy leaves the village.

== Development ==
=== Characterisation ===
Andy came to the village as a troubled 10-year-old. He was over the moon when the Sugdens fostered him. Although he has had some dark times in the past, including accidentally killing adopted mother Sarah, being involved in a hit and run and domestic abuse, he has now matured into a responsible, dependable conscientious father to his two children with his former girlfriend Debbie, Sarah and Jack.

— itv.com on Andy

=== Feud with Robert Sugden ===
In 2001, the role of Robert Sugden was recast to Karl Davies, allowing the character to become involved in more adult storylines. When the character's previous actor Christopher Smith was written out of the show, a storyline saw Robert leave for Spain after discovering that Andy had been responsible for starting the fire that killed their mother Sarah Sugden (Alyson Spiro). Upon Robert's return, Davies considered how Robert would evolve into an antagonist and feud with Andy: "He seems to do a good job at fooling his dad. Jack thinks he's making an effort to get along with Andy, but in fact, when his dad is not around, Robert is being very nasty". Considering Robert's intentions to seek revenge on Andy for his role in Sarah's death, Davies added: "At first it's all mind games but ultimately he believes he can push Andy out of the family for good".

The revelation of Robert's affair with Andy's wife Katie Addyman (Sammy Winward) results in Andy accidentally shooting their father Jack (Clive Hornby) in his attempt to kill Robert as an act of revenge. A show insider revealed: "Andy is devastated when Katie leaves him for his brother Robert and decides to murder his rival. Robert and Katie move into a caravan, so Andy lies in wait with his shotgun. He fires as the door opens, thinking it's Robert. But he's horrified when he realises he's shot his own father. Jack is rushed into intensive care, while Andy is arrested for what police believe will soon become murder. Doctors say that there's little hope for Jack's survival."

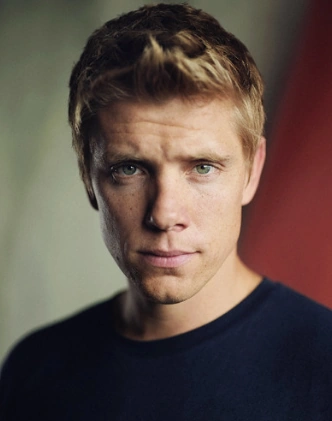
Ryan Hawley (pictured) was recast as Robert Sugden in 2014

In September 2014, Robert was reintroduced to the programme, with the role now recast to Ryan Hawley. The brothers clash immediately and it was teased that Andy would punch Robert shortly after his arrival. Reflecting on the recurring feud between the characters, Fletcher said: "Robert starts saying some really horrible things. He comes in acting really smarmy and his arrogance is unbelievable. He really belittles Andy and Katie. The digs he makes at Andy are quite personal and he really insults Katie too. He even refers to her as the village bike. So Andy just snaps and hits him. It was one of the first scenes I shot with Ryan, so that was a bit weird. I had to dislike him immediately. But credit to Ryan — he played it so well that I really wanted to crack him!"

In November 2015, it was announced that the brothers would be at the centre of a major car crash stunt, mirroring the events of Robert's exit storyline in 2005. The stunt emerged in the aftermath of the "Who Shot Robert Sugden?" storyline, in which a flashback episode revealed Andy organised for Ross Barton (Michael Parr) to shoot Robert. Speaking on the stunt, Hawley stated: "Andy and Robert square up to each other and they're both feeling very betrayed and hurt. Both of them have lost quite a lot. Hopefully there'll be some great scenes between me and Kelvin — and what happens next is a really cool stunt." Additionally, he reflected on how it represented the brother's long-standing feud and previous storylines: "I actually watched those scenes when I first got the job, because that was the last time the audience saw Robert, barring his very quick appearance for Jack's funeral. These scenes are almost a recreation of that."

=== Relationship with Katie Addyman ===
In 2001, Sammy Winward was cast in the role of Katie Addyman, introduced as a new love interest for Andy and branded as his "first love". Rick Fulton teased: "Young Andy gets caught with cigarettes at school and gets detention. There he meets Kate — and a spark develops between the two which continues over the summer break." The following year, the couple were the focus of a teenage pregnancy storyline, in which Katie and Andy deliberately decide to have a child to prove their love for each other after they are forbidden for seeing each other. Emmerdale worked closely with Parentline Plus' "Time To Talk About Sex" campaign, which encouraged parents to have open conversations with their children about sex and relationships. Clive Hornby, who portrays Andy's adoptive father Jack Sugden, suggested that had his character had a more open relationship with his son and been able to talk about sex and relationships with him then it may have prevented the pregnancy: "Jack's always had a close relationship with his three children and even as a single father he's done well to bring them up in a balanced way. But when he came to Andy and Katie's relationship he overlooked it and didn't find it easy to brooch the subject of sex with them. If he had, then maybe the whole situation would have turned out differently."

In late 2003, Katie begins an affair with Andy's adoptive brother Robert Sugden (Karl Davies). The affair continues during the build-up of her wedding to Andy, with Winward stating: "Katie has always intended to go ahead with the wedding. Initially she thought that the affair with Robert was just a little fling. Andy is a safe kind of guy and although he's not boring as such, Katie doesn't find him very exciting either. Robert on the other hand is a risk-taker and Katie finds that extremely attractive". Fletcher considered how Katie's infidelity contributed to his character developing trust issues: "Because [Katie] had an affair with his brother, Robert, and slept with him on the eve of their wedding. He tells her it's no wonder he's suspicious after what she did to him".

Andy and Katie rekindled their relationship in 2014. Fletcher expressed his delight at the characters reuniting: "I am glad — partly on the viewers' behalf, really! For years now, Emmerdale fans have come up to me and said, 'I wish Andy would get back with Katie'. They were childhood sweethearts who went their separate ways and had other relationships which didn't really work out, so to see them rekindle their love is great. They have a lot of history there and they are great for one another." Later that year, it was teased that Andy would propose to Katie for an eventual second marriage. Fletcher considered how his character felt it was an appropriate time to get engaged: "It all starts when Sarah makes a flippant remark about them all being a happy family unit together. Andy expects Katie to say, 'Slow down Sarah, we're not there yet!', but actually it doesn't freak her out at all. The fact that Katie doesn't react badly is reassuring for Andy. She doesn't run a million miles, which pleases him and gives him that reassurance that he's been hoping for."

=== Domestic abuse and marriage to Jo Stiles ===
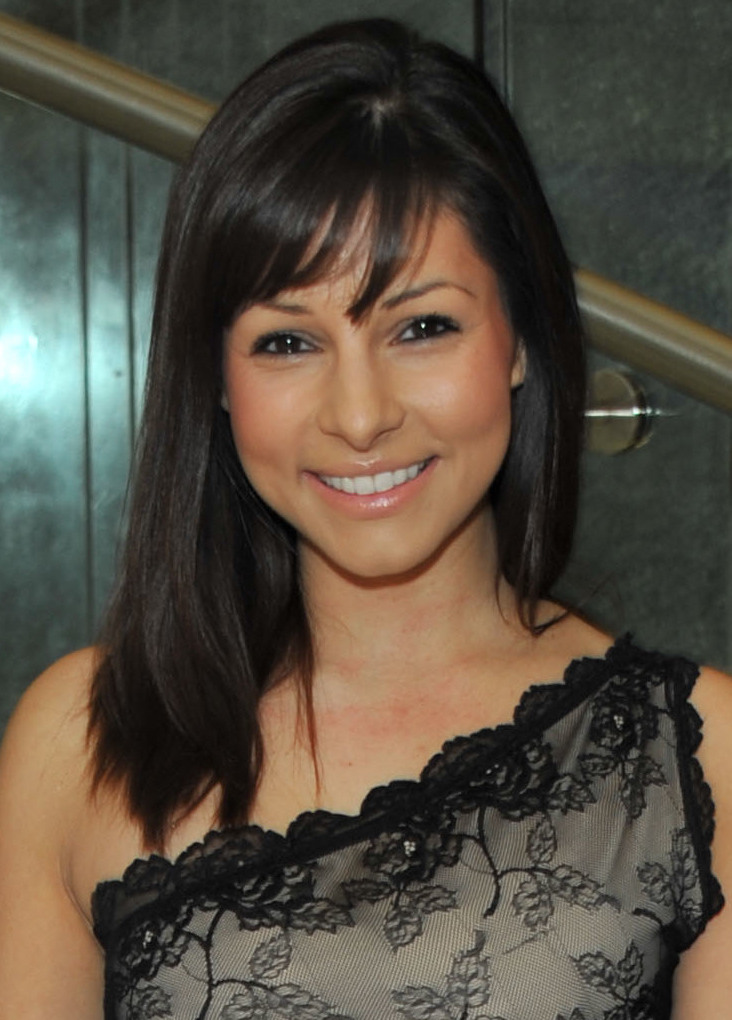
Roxanne Pallett (pictured) played the role of Andy's wife and abuse victim Jo Stiles and experienced domestic abuse herself in reality

In late 2007, Andy became the centre of a domestic abuse storyline against his fiancée and eventual second wife Jo Stiles (Roxanne Pallett). Fletcher was initially sceptical of his character's involvement in the storyline, stating: "When I first read the scripts, I was sceptical. But the thing is, people think Andy's going to turn into the devil, but he's really just insecure. Him and Jo had a massive row and in a moment of anger he lashed out. Of course I don't condone it, but there aren't any plans to make him really nasty. Hopefully he's going to face his demons. He's already aware of what he did and regrets it desperately. But unfortunately it might happen again. You can always expect a turbulent life with Andy." In the aftermath of the storyline, Fletcher admitted his sympathy towards Andy and explained that Andy's abusive behavior stemmed from deep-seated trust issues and psychological vulnerabilities: "He’s not a demon. He has serious trust issues and he just can't help himself. I really feel for him."

Whilst speaking about the storyline, Pallett said: "We need to bring this subject to the forefront where women are watching it. Not just women, I'm sure there are plenty of men in that situation where women are controlling men... But there's people all over the country that I'm sure tonight will be sitting there and they'll see Andy and Jo at home and they'll be watching it. Behind closed doors they're suffering from that." During an appearance on This Morning, Pallett expressed how the storyline was difficult for her to film as she had a personal similar experience in real-life: "Kelvin and I have been living this storyline since Christmas and you're researching it and it brings it all back to you and it's devastating. I can't even watch these scenes back without it choking me up. I watched it with my mum and we just sat and she held my hand through it all because it's devastating. And what you're seeing is just a fraction of what people are still going through."

=== Feud with the White family and departure ===
In March 2016, Andy entered a romance with Robert's ex-wife Chrissie White (Louise Marwood), which was later dubbed "Chrandy" in the media. Discussing the relationship, Marwood analysed, "I think they're both vulnerable. After everything that happened with Robert and after everything that happened with Katie, it's just two people who find themselves in this situation and suddenly realise actually that they are vulnerable so they look after each other and then it suddenly becomes something else." Fletcher considered the class divide between the couple, stating, "I think Andy's quite an insecure character in that sense. He's well aware of – I don't know if it's a class thing – but certainly the big house and Lady of the Manor and that. I think he does find it somewhat intimidating. And why would she even look twice at him? He's just a farmhand who’s helping out on the estate. I think he's very flattered when she does want to spend time with him. Later on there are things that Chrissie does that he’s really flattered by. She stands up for herself and she's quite open to the fact that he is what he is."

However, their relationship evolves after Andy has an affair with Bernice Blackstock (Samantha Giles). Executive producer Iain MacLeod teased a revenge plot involving the two characters: "The first power play that Chrissie makes is to seek revenge on Andy for breaking her heart. So she attempts to ruin his life but all the while standing by him, going to bed with him at night and pretending that she is his staunch supporter but behind the scenes she's maneuvering to try and ruin him. That's a really big thing coming over the next few months." It was subsequently announced that Chrissie would frame Andy for the attempted murder of her father Lawrence White (John Bowe) as part of her revenge plot.

Well I think it's been established before that he's probably not the brightest bulb in the box. I don't think anyone could blame him because throughout all of this, she's his biggest advocate really. So it's not that he's being a bit dumb and not seeing what the audience are obviously seeing throughout. The way it's shot, the audience are kind of on Chrissie's journey. So whether they're going to understand and sympathise with what she's doing is another matter. But the fact is they're seeing what she's doing. They know why she's doing it - whether you agree or disagree is a different matter. But she plays it so well and that's where the great soap bitch comes out in her. It's like a Jekyll and Hyde, playing these two completely different characters - where when she's with Andy, she's nothing but loving, supportive and again is his biggest advocate. So really you can understand why he's not seeing it, I think it's maybe until it's too late when he first realises. And I'm sure when he does find out, if he does find out, then he'd be heartbroken because he feels he's been loyal and supportive and everything to Chrissie.

— Fletcher discussing Chrissie framing Andy for attempted murder

On 1 August 2016, it was reported that Fletcher would be departing the programme and had already filmed his final scenes. Reports ensured a "big and dramatic exit" with the door being left open for Fletcher to reprise the role in the future. His exit scenes were broadcast on 16 August, with his departure being confirmed that day. Reflecting on his decision to leave, Fletched stated, "I've always had aspirations to play other characters, but over the years I've always felt so happy and so challenged at Emmerdale. So the decision to leave the show never really came, until probably the last 18 months. I'd just had the happiest two or three years I've ever had at Emmerdale, with some really good storylines. I felt comfortable and confident in myself, so I wanted to at least give it a go and try other things. But it's testament to Emmerdale that I felt confident to pursue another challenge." His decision to leave the programme was initially kept confidential, with Fletcher only informing colleagues Danny Miller, James Hooton and Adam Thomas before being given permission from producers to tell other members of the cast.

== Reception ==
The episode which saw Andy set fire to the barn won the "Spectacular Scene of the Year" award at the 2001 British Soap Awards. The character was selected as one of the "top 100 British soap characters" by industry experts for a poll to be run by What's on TV, with readers able to vote for their favourite character to discover "Who is Soap's greatest Legend?" Di Hollingsworth from Soaplife included Andy's arson and manslaughter plot in their list of top ten soap storylines in which characters get away with committing crimes. She added "you have to feel sorry for poor Andy" because he only wanted to help Jack.

== See also ==
- List of Emmerdale characters introduced in 1996
- List of soap opera villains
