= List of Emmerdale Farm characters introduced in 1982–1983 =

The following is a list of characters that first appeared in the British soap opera Emmerdale Farm in 1982 and 1983, by order of first appearance.

== Samuel Skilbeck ==
Samuel Skilbeck
- Emmerdale character
- Portrayed by: Benjamin Whitehead
- Duration: 1982–1991
- First appearance: 23 December 1982
- Last appearance: 9 July 1991
- Introduced by: Michael Glynn
In-universe information
- Father: Matt Skilbeck
- Mother: Dolly Skilbeck
- Half-brothers: Graham Lodsworth; Sam Skilbeck
- Half-sisters: Sally Skilbeck
- Grandfathers: Oliver Skilbeck
- Grandmothers: Elizabeth Skilbeck; Phyllis Purwick
- Other relatives: Beattie Dowton; Jessie Renfrew

Samuel David Skilbeck (known as Sam) is the son of Matt and Dolly Skilbeck. He appeared from 1982 to 1991.

Samuel is born in December 1982 and is named after Sam Pearson, the grandfather of Matt's first wife, Peggy Skilbeck. Matt and Peggy had a son Sam Skilbeck who died young. The original idea was to call the child David Samuel, but after a misunderstanding, the name is altered to Samuel Benjamin. Matt and Dolly separated in 1989, and Dolly and Sam left the village in 1991. The following year, Dolly remarried Matt.

== Archie Brooks ==
Archie Brooks
- Emmerdale character
- Portrayed by: Tony Pitts
- Duration: 1983–1993
- First appearance: 15 November 1983
- Last appearance: 30 December 1993
- Created by: Kevin Laffan
- Introduced by: Michael Glynn
In-universe information
- Occupation: Slaughter house worker; Handyman; Bartender; Child minder
- Father: Warren Brooks
- Mother: April Brooks

Archie Brooks is a fictional character from the British ITV soap opera Emmerdale, played by Tony Pitts. Pitts had a 10-year span as Archie between 1983 and 1993, but was axed and Archie became one of the victims of the Emmerdale plane crash. Pitts was cast as Archie after being seen in a theatre adaptation of Nicholas Nickleby. His casting marked Pitts' first television role, and after staying on Emmerdale for ten years, he was axed in 1993.

Over the first few years in the village Archie gained a reputation as a somewhat unreliable character: he was paid to fix the boiler in the local public house The Woolpack but after he supposedly repaired it became faulty and nearly released gas into the air; and he was also paid by Alan Turner to repair the motor on his car, but Archie ended up tampering with the brakes, nearly causing Alan to have an accident. However, Nick began to lead Archie astray and one evening they went joyriding in Hotton and ended up in the cells for a night. They also frequently caused trouble in The Woolpack, by winding up other customers and arguing over the prices that pub landlord Amos Brearly was selling the alcohol at. The trouble eventually ceased when Archie and Nick were warned by Amos, who threatened to bar them. Nick is the first person who finds out that Archie worked at a slaughterhouse prior to his arrival in the village, and that he was sacked after an accident with a band saw.

Archie initially arrived in the village in November 1983 when he gets a part-time job as a road sweeper. He begins a short-lived relationship with Sandie Merrick and left the village a couple of months later. However, he returned once again in mid–1984 and began working as the village handyman, doing bit jobs here and there. He attempted to rekindle his romance with Sandie but she had entered a relationship with David Blackmore.

Archie befriended Seth Armstrong and later he also befriended Nick Bates when he arrived in the village, also embarking on a brief relationship with Nick's elder sister Kathy.

After splitting up with Kathy and spending a couple of months single, Archie patiently pursued Rachel Hughes and eventually she slept with him and they began a relationship. Rachel is devastated when Archie is sent to prison. Archie is released from prison in January 1989, halfway through his sentence, for good behavior and begins working as a barman at The Woolpack again. He resumes his romantic liaison with Rachel but later discovers that she is having an affair with married Pete Whiteley. Devastated at Rachel's betrayal, Archie becomes depressed and begins drinking heavily. He resents Rachel and begins to blame Nick for having him sent to prison. He pushes out all of his friends but eventually with support from Nick, Kathy and Seth he comes around and recovers from his depressed state. He continues to resent Rachel for her betrayal, but they later becomes friends again when Archie supports her when her mother Kate is sent to prison for accidentally killing Pete Whiteley while drunk driving.

However, later in 1989 Nick's brother-in-law Jackie Merrick is killed after accidentally shooting himself while hunting a fox with Seth for a bet. Nick blames Seth for Jackie's death and leaving Kathy a widow, and he enlists the help of Archie to set fire to Seth's Hide as revenge. However, the police are alerted and although Nick escapes Archie is caught and arrested. Feeling guilty as Seth was his friend, Archie pleads guilty to arson at his trial and is sentenced to twelve months in prison. Nick later visits Archie in prison and Archie forgives him for having him put in prison, and gives him a letter to give Seth telling him that he was sorry for vandalizing his land.

Archie grows close to local vet Zoe Tate and they begin sleeping together. However, after a couple of months, Zoe reveals to Archie that she is gay. Archie is devastated and nearly relapses into alcoholism, but sees sense and he and Zoe decide to remain friends.

On New Year's Eve 1993, Archie and Nick go to The Woolpack and encounter Seth and Lynn Whiteley. Seth and Lynn wind Archie and Nick up over the rumors that Elsa is spreading that they are gay lovers in order to strengthen her case in her custody battle for Alice. Archie and Nick then leave the pub following an argument with Seth and Lynn but as they are walking home a plane crashes on the village. Archie and Nick are blinded by jet fuel and a ball of fire engulfs Archie in flames. Archie is never seen again and is presumed dead by the village, although his body is never found.
