= Spare Parts (audio drama) =

2002 Doctor Who audio drama

Big Finish Productions audio drama
- Series: Doctor Who
- Release no.: 34
- Featuring: Fifth Doctor, Nyssa
- Written by: Marc Platt
- Directed by: Gary Russell
- Produced by: Gary Russell; Jason Haigh-Ellery
- Executive producer: Jacqueline Rayner
- Production code: 6CE
- Length: 2 hrs 1 min
- Release date: July 2002
- Preceded by: "Neverland"
- Followed by: "...ish"

Spare Parts is a Big Finish Productions audio drama based on the long-running British science fiction television series Doctor Who.

Spare Parts was partially adapted into the television episodes "Rise of the Cybermen" and "The Age of Steel" although, in actuality, the two stories bear little resemblance to each other.

== Plot ==
The Doctor and Nyssa arrive on a frozen planet, in a city where cybernetic implants are all that is keeping the population from death. The Doctor knows this planet all too well, and refuses to interfere in events that will become the birth of the Cybermen.

== Cast ==
- The Doctor — Peter Davison
- Nyssa — Sarah Sutton
- Yvonne Hartley — Kathryn Guck
- Dad — Paul Copley
- Thomas Dodd — Derren Nesbitt
- Sisterman Constant — Pamela Binns
- Frank Hartley — Jim Hartley
- Mrs Ginsberg — Ann Jenkins
- Doctorman Allan — Sally Knyvette
- Zheng — Nicholas Briggs

Uncredited:

- Citizen 1 – Marc Platt
- Cybermen – Nicholas Briggs
- Radio Announcer – Nicholas Briggs
- Citizen 2 – Nicholas Briggs
- Nurse – Nicholas Briggs
- The Minister – Alistair Lock
- TV Commentator – Alistair Lock
- Crewman Philpott – Gary Russell
- Nurse – Gary Russell

== Production ==
Marc Platt was reluctant to write a Cyberman story, as he felt their plausibility as a convincing villain over the history of the series had declined too markedly. However, he realised that by writing an origin story, he could go right back to the basics of what the Cybermen had originally been intended to be by Kit Pedler, which he felt were a far scarier concept than the later incarnations.

Platt was determined that the story should be a tragedy. Unlike the Daleks, which were aliens driven by Nazi-like beliefs, the Mondasians were very much human. Spare Parts thus became a story of how humans could become so desperate that they would reject their humanity – even their emotions – to survive.

Because of these close links to the original concept for the Cybermen, there are various references to the first Cyberman story, The Tenth Planet. The sing-song voices of the Cybermen are the same as used in that episode, and references to cloth masks indicate that they are the same design of Cyberman. The Cyberplanner expands on the brief description of Mondasian history in the television story. Marc Platt has stated that Eric Krailford, mentioned several times though never appearing, is intended to be the human who will eventually become Cyberman Krail from The Tenth Planet. The death of Adric in Earthshock, indirectly caused by the Cybermen, is alluded to several times. The concept of a planetary propulsion unit on the surface of Mondas was derived from Attack of the Cybermen.

Roger Lloyd-Pack was originally approached to play Mr Hartley, but was unable to. Eventually he was cast as the creator of the alternate universe Cybermen in "Rise of the Cybermen". Pamela Binns agreed to play Sisterman Constant partly because she rarely had the chance to play villains. Constant is not strictly a villain, but certainly not wholly on the side of good (at least from the Doctor’s point of view). Sally Knyvette made being allowed to bring her dog to the studio a condition of playing Doctorman Allan. Derren Nesbitt had a history of being cast in Doctor Who, having played villainous warlord Tegana in the 1964 First Doctor serial Marco Polo. Nicholas Briggs has done a lot of work for Big Finish, most notably writing and voicing the Daleks for the Dalek Empire series. He also provides most of the monster voices for the new TV series, including the Cybermen.

== Reception ==
Fan and critical reaction to Spare Parts has largely been very positive.

Writing for Screen Rant Mark Donaldson called the episode a "exceptional audio drama that remains one of Big Finish's finest hours, two decades on from its original release."

In his introduction to Big Finish: The Inside Story, Russell T Davies called this story (along with The Holy Terror) "some of the finest drama ever written for any genre, in any medium, anywhere".

=== Adaptation ===
The story was loosely adapted into the Doctor Who series 2 episode "Rise of the Cybermen"/"The Age of Steel". However, writer Tom MacRae noted that his television story was not a simple rewrite of Spare Parts: "My story isn't the same — it's got a different setting, different themes, and different characters, [because] once we started talking, the whole thing developed in a very different direction. But as Russell says, we wouldn't have started this whole line of thinking if he hadn't heard Spare Parts in the first place." Spare Parts takes place on the planet Mondas of the regular Doctor Who universe, rather than the parallel Earth of "Rise of the Cybermen", and the two stories feature two entirely separate races of Cybermen.
