= She'll Be Wearing Pink Pyjamas =

1985 British film by John Goldschmidt

- Directed by: John Goldschmidt
- Written by: Eva Hardy
- Starring: Julie Walters; Anthony Higgins
- Music by: John Du Prez
- Production company: Channel 4
- Release date: 1985
- Country: United Kingdom
- Language: English
- Budget: £954,893–1 million

She'll Be Wearing Pink Pyjamas is a 1985 British comedy film directed by John Goldschmidt and starring Julie Walters, Anthony Higgins and former Emmerdale actress Alyson Spiro. It deals with the experiences of eight women from diverse backgrounds on an all-female survival course in the Lake District. It was released on DVD in the UK in 2007.

== Cast ==
- Julie Walters as Fran
- Anthony Higgins as Tom
- Jane Evers as Catherine
- Janet Henfrey as Lucy
- Paula Jacobs as Doreen
- Penelope Nice as Ann
- Maureen O'Brien as Joan
- Alyson Spiro as Anita
- Jane Wood as Judith
- Pauline Yates as Diane
