= List of Emmerdale Farm characters introduced in 1977 =

The following is a list of characters that first appeared in the British soap opera Emmerdale Farm in 1977, by order of first appearance.

== Dolly Skilbeck ==
Dolly Skilbeck (also Acaster) first appears on 22 February 1977, played by Katharine Barker. Barker portrayed the role for two years, until it was recast to Jean Rogers, who appeared as Dolly until 1991.

Dolly arrives in Beckindale from Darlington to serve as a barmaid in the Woolpack. She begins a relationship with Matt Skilbeck (Frederick Pyne), and they later get married. She becomes pregnant with his child, but after suffering a stillbirth, Dolly begins working at the village playgroup. The pair later have a son, Sam Skilbeck (Jamie Bell), who is born on 23 December 1982. After becoming pregnant for a third time, Dolly miscarries. It later emerges that Dolly had a son in the mid-1960s, and gave him up for adoption. Her child, Graham Lodsworth (Ross Kemp), later finds her. When Matt discovers that he has inherited Crossgill Farm from the previous owner, Dolly informs him that she wants to move out of Emmerdale. Matt refuses, and they begin to grow apart, resulting in her affair with timber consultant Stephen Fuller (Gregory Floy). Stephen is killed by a falling tree, and Dolly arranges his funeral. Dolly leaves Matt and begins divorce proceedings, and leaves the village in 1991. Dolly and Sam move to Norfolk to join Matt. It is later confirmed that Dolly and Matt have gotten remarried off-screen in 1992.

== Donald Hinton ==
Donald Hinton
- Emmerdale character
- Portrayed by: Hugh Manning
- Duration: 1977–1989, 1993
- First appearance: 25 October 1977
- Last appearance: 28 October 1993
- Introduced by: David Cunliffe (1977); Keith Richardson (1993)
In-universe information
- Occupation: Vicar
- Brothers: Gavin Hinton
- Wife: Mary Hinton
- Sons: Clive Hinton
- Daughters: Barbara Hinton

Donald Hinton, was first seen in October 1977 when he took over as the vicar of Beckindale and moved into the vicarage. His son Clive turned up in early 1978. Hinton married Matt Skilbeck and Dolly Acaster in 1978 and soon became a good friend of the Sugdens. In 1978 he helped in the investigations into a dead body which was found underneath The Woolpack when the boilerman was doing maintenance. Hinton and Mr Moeketski found the skeleton was of a woman who was the ancestor of Sam Pearson.

Hinton returns as a special guest at Annie Sugden's wedding to Leonard Kempinski. This was his final appearance in the show and final visit to Beckindale. He has not been seen or heard from since.

== Liz MacDonald ==
Liz MacDonald
- Emmerdale character
- Portrayed by: Elizabeth Mickery
- Duration: 1977, 1984–1986, 1988, 1990
- First appearance: 24 November 1977
- Last appearance: 3 May 1990
- Introduced by: David Cunliffe (1977); Michael Glynn (1984); Keith Richardson (1986, 1988, 1990)
In-universe information
- Husband: Jock MacDonald (until 1988)
- Daughters: Judy MacDonald

Liz MacDonald, played by Elizabeth Mickery is married to Jock MacDonald and the mother of their daughter, Judy. Liz appears periodically between 1977 and 1990. Liz builds up a friendship with Dolly Skillbeck and often babysits her son, Sam for her. In 1988, Liz divorces Jock and takes Judy to live with her and makes her final appearance in 1990 when she worries about Jock after Kim Tate's horse kicks him in the head.
