= List of Emmerdale Farm characters introduced in 1988 =

Characters from UK television series

The following is a list of characters that first appeared in the British soap opera Emmerdale in 1988, by order of first appearance. Sarah Sugden (originally played by Madeleine Howard) first appeared in April, with Dennis Rigg (Richard Franklin) debuting in July. Kate Sugden (Sally Knyvette), and is soon followed by her children, Rachel (Glenda McKay) and Mark Hughes (Craig McKay). Additionally, multiple other characters appeared throughout the year.

== Barbara ==
Barbara
- Emmerdale character
- Portrayed by: Angela Down
- First appearance: 3 February 1988
- Last appearance: 3 March 1988
- Introduced by: Stuart Doughty
In-universe information
- Occupation: History teacher
- Sons: John Sugden

Barbara, played by Angela Down, was a History teacher with whom Jack Sugden (Clive Hornby) had a brief fling, resulting in the conception of their son, John Sugden (Oliver Farnworth). Jack, however, was never aware of John's existence. In July 2024, it was revealed that Barbara had recently died, as Eric Pollard (Chris Chittell) attended her funeral. There, he met John, and revealed to Victoria Sugden (Isabel Hodgins) that he could be her half-brother. She tries to get to know John and revealed to him that their father, Jack, died in 2009.

Barbara was a friend of Caroline Bates (Diana Davies), who attended her daughter Kathy Bates (Malandra Burrows) wedding to Jack's son, Jackie Merrick (Ian Sharrock) in 1988. Jack was immediately taken by her. At the wedding reception at Emmerdale Farm, Caroline formally introduced the pair to one another. There is a noticeable attraction between the two. Barbara and Jack talk about their previous marriages, Jack having been widowed nearly two years prior following his wife Pat Sugden's (Helen Weir) death and Barbara's marriage having broken down after she had fallen out of love with her husband. The pair began to spend so much time together that Jack began to miss family events, such as his brother, Joe Sugden (Frazer Hines) buying Home Farm Estate at auction, and Kathy and Jackie's welcome home party. Jack was smitten with Barbara, however their fling didn't last long because Barbara revealed she was still in love with the man she left her ex-husband for. Jack understood that Barbara wasn't ready for a relationship, so they split up amicably. Unbeknownst to Jack, Barbara had fallen pregnant as a result of their fling, and their son, John was born later that year, who took his last name.

== Denis Rigg ==
Denis Rigg, played by Richard Franklin, appeared between 1988 and 1989. He cheats Alan Turner (Richard Thorp) into selling his share of Home Farm to him at a low price. Alan's business partner, Joe Sugden (Frazer Hines), is angry at this and promptly sells his share too. Denis goes on to terrorise the villagers by threatening to evict them all from their homes if they refuse to comply with his demands, since he owns the majority of the houses and farms in the area. Denis looks to Emmerdale Farm to expand his business, and this leads to a confrontation between him and Joe. In the barn, a bull gets aggravated by Denis' threatening and aggressive behaviour, and crushes him against a wall, killing him.

== Kate Sugden ==
Kate Sugden
- Emmerdale character
- Portrayed by: Sally Knyvette
- Duration: 1988–1991
- First appearance: 25 August 1988
- Last appearance: 20 August 1991
- Introduced by: Stuart Doughty
In-universe information
- Other names: Kate Hughes
- Occupation: Waitress; Supermarket worker; Farmer
- Father: Eddie Hammond
- Husband: David Hughes (1968–1986); Joe Sugden (1989–1991)
- Sons: Mark Hughes
- Daughters: Rachel Hughes
- Grandsons: Joe Tate

Kate Sugden (also Hughes), played by Sally Knyvette, made her first appearance on 25 August 1988. The character was introduced by new series producer Stuart Doughty, who wanted the serial to feel more up to date. Divorcée Kate and her teenage children were considered "outsiders" and not used to country life, which challenged the Sugdens' way of life.

Kate arrives in the village with her two children Rachel Hughes (Glenda McKay) and Mark Hughes (Craig McKay) following her divorce from David Hughes (Martyn Whitby). She clashes with Joe Sugden (Frazer Hines) after he shoots her dog; they eventually fell in love. She marries Joe later that year despite opposition from Rachel and Mark. Kate quits her job as a waitress and buys Matt Skilbeck's (Frederick Pyne) share of Emmerdale Farm. After arguing with Rachel's lover Pete Whiteley (Jim Millea), Kate has several drinks at The Woolpack and accidentally runs down and kills Pete with her car. Kate receives a two-year prison sentence for manslaughter. When she is released from prison 12 months later, she tries to reconcile her marriage with Joe, but they are unable to make it work, so Kate ends their marriage. Realising there is nothing left in Beckindale for her, Kate leaves the village for her home city of Sheffield. Rachel and Mark stay with Joe in Emmerdale. Kate does not attend Mark's funeral. A few years later, Kate dies off-screen of a brain haemorrhage.

== Rachel Hughes ==
Rachel Hughes, played by Glenda McKay, arrives in Beckindale in 1988 with her mother Kate (Sally Knyvette) and brother Mark (Craig McKay). Rachel discovers she is pregnant, and gives birth to son Joe, on the same day her former stepfather died, naming her son in his honour. In 1998, Rachel begins dating schoolteacher Graham Clark (Kevin Pallister) and he begins to exert control over her, by getting her to dye her hair and dress like his late wife Rebecca. Graham takes Rachel on a picnic, where she tries to end their relationship. When Graham tries to force himself on her, Rachel tries to flee but he corners her on a clifftop. Rachel then informs Graham that she knows he killed his wife; Graham panics and pushes Rachel off the cliff to her death. In 2017, Rachel and Chris's son Joseph Tate (now Ned Porteous) returns to the village under the false name Tom Waterhouse to get revenge on Charity Dingle (Emma Atkins). Joseph talks about Rachel's death and how he doesn't remember her.

== Mark Hughes ==
Mark Hughes
- Emmerdale character
- Portrayed by: Craig McKay
- Duration: 1988–1994
- First appearance: 7 September 1988
- Last appearance: 4 January 1994
- Introduced by: Stuart Doughty
In-universe information
- Father: David Hughes
- Mother: Kate Sugden
- Stepfather: Joe Sugden (1989–1991)
- Sisters: Rachel Hughes
- Grandfathers: Eddie Hammond
- Nephews: Joseph Tate

Mark Hughes, played by Craig McKay, first appears on 7 September 1988. He is introduced as the 15-year-old son of Kate (Sally Knyvette), alongside sister Rachel (Glenda McKay). He becomes a troublesome teenager, which coincided with his mother's relationship and subsequent marriage to Joe Sugden (Frazer Hines). Mark runs away from home after Kate announces her intention to move in with Joe. He intends to go to Germany to be with his father, but only makes it as far as Hull. His father David (Martyn Whitby) alerts Kate, who brings Mark home.

When he goes to the pub with his sister and her older friends, he wants to prove he is mature by drinking alcohol, but is cautioned for underage drinking. Mark then begins shoplifting. He steals items he does not need, and is eventually caught by Rachel and Sarah Connolly (Madeleine Howard). He is subsequently arrested and given a warning at the police station; meanwhile, his mother collapses and suffers a miscarriage, and Mark blames himself for this. After leaving school, Mark initially intends to join the army and follow in his father's footsteps. However, he decides to stay at school and study A-Levels in Art, Technical Drawing and English, but he refuses to turn up to his final exams and, as a result, loses his place at the University of Glasgow. Mark then gets himself into debt by letting his friends use telephone chatlines, and he has to get a job at the Woolpack to pay them off. Mark dies in the 1993 plane crash that affects the village. Mark is crushed by a falling wall, and Jack Sugden (Clive Hornby) identifies his body after recognising his watch amongst recovered items.

== Other characters ==
Character	Date(s)	Actor	Circumstances
Judy MacDonald	6–12 January 1988, 12 April – 3 May 1990 (9 episodes)	Natalie Worsnopp; Uncredited	The daughter of Jock (Drew Dawson) and Liz MacDonald (Lizzie Mickery). When Jock and Liz separate, Judy goes to live with her mother.
Sonia Bates	6-8 February (2 episodes)	Erica Lynley	Malcolm Bates' (Tom Adams) second wife. She gives birth to their son William in October 1987. She and William attend Malcolm's daughter, Kathy's (Malandra Burrows) wedding to Jackie Merrick (Ian Sharrock).
William Bates	6-8 February (2 episodes)	Uncredited	The son of Sonia (Erica Lynley) and Malcolm Bates (Tom Adams).
Stephen Fuller	13 April – 23 June	Gregory Floy	A lumberjack who shows interest in cutting down some trees in the plantation at Home Farm. Stephen begins an affair with Dolly Skilbeck (Jean Rogers) due to her frustration with her husband Matt's (Frederick Pyne) lack of ambition. Stephen and Dolly's affair is short-lived and they part amicably and he leaves for Scotland. In November, News reaches Beckindale that Stephen has been killed by a falling tree, which leaves Dolly devastated. Dolly then arranges his funeral.
Rosemary Gray	17–18 August 1988, 15–27 March 1990 (6 episodes)	Christina Greatrex	A friend of Alan Turner (Richard Thorp). Alan invites Rosemary to dinner in order to make Caroline Bates jealous. Alan later invites Rosemary to the Hunt Ball at Home Farm, where he leads her to believe that he lives. However, it is not long before Alan's deception is revealed to Rosemary.
