= Alyson Spiro =

British actress

Alyson Spiro is a British actress, best known for portraying Sarah Sugden on the British television soap opera Emmerdale from 1994 to 2000. She took over the role from Madeleine Howard, after she decided to leave the ITV show after six years. Spiro has also appeared in the programmes Brookside, Casualty, The Bill, Doctors, Holby City, Sapphire and Steel and Fell Tiger.

Spiro portrayed Astrid Kirchherr in the 1979 film Birth of the Beatles, and appeared in the 1985 film She'll Be Wearing Pink Pyjamas.
