= Jack Sugden =

Fictional character from Emmerdale

- Emmerdale character
- Clive Hornby as Jack Sugden (2007)
- Portrayed by: Andrew Burt (1972–1976); Clive Hornby (1980–2008)
- Duration: 1972–1973, 1976, 1980–2008
- First appearance: 16 October 1972
- Last appearance: 21 February 2008
- Created by: Kevin Laffan
- Introduced by: David Goddard (1972); Michael Glynn (1976); Anne Gibbons (1980)
- Andrew Burt as Jack Sugden (1972)
In-universe information
- Occupation: Farmer
- Family: Sugden
- Father: Jacob Sugden
- Mother: Annie Sugden
- Brothers: Joe Sugden
- Sisters: Peggy Skilbeck
- Wife: Pat Merrick (1982–1986); Sarah Connolly (1994–2000); Diane Blackstock (2004–2009)
- Sons: Jackie Merrick; Robert Sugden; John Sugden
- Daughters: Victoria Sugden
- Adoptive sons: Andy Sugden
- Stepsons: Tommy Merrick
- Stepdaughters: Sandie Merrick; Bernice Blackstock
- Grandsons: Jack Sugden (adoptive); Sebastian White; Harry Sugden
- Granddaughters: Sarah Sugden (adoptive)
- Grandfathers: Joseph Sugden; Sam Pearson
- Grandmothers: Margaret Sugden; Grace Pearson
- Uncles: Edward Sugden
- Nephews: Sam Skilbeck
- Nieces: Sally Skilbeck

John Jacob "Jack" Sugden is a fictional character from the British ITV soap opera Emmerdale. The character was originally played by Andrew Burt from 1972 to 1973 with a brief return in 1976, when the actor left for Italy to write a book. On the character's return in 1980 he was played by Clive Hornby. Hornby remained in the role until 2008 when he was forced to take a break from Emmerdale due to illness. His last on-screen appearance was on 21 February 2008, and his absence was explained by the character visiting his mother, Annie Sugden (Sheila Mercier) in Spain. Although Hornby was intended to return, he died from his illness in July 2008 without returning to the programme. Jack was written out following Hornby's death, dying off-screen of a heart attack in February 2009.

== Creation and casting ==
Jacob and Annie Sugden's son Jack is one of the original characters in Emmerdale. The Sugden family were the owners of Emmerdale Farm from the programme's early days. Jack and his younger siblings, Peggy Skilbeck and Joe all worked on the farm.

From the early days, Jack appeared to be a very rebellious and self-righteous character who cared little for others' views. He also has numerous flings with different women and failed marriages, due to his infidelity. Jack is an intelligent and articulate man but shown to keep secrets from his family. As time passed and Jack became a father, he has matured much more. He has firmly secured his roots in farming, which he originally tried so hard to escape from. Jack is still a man of principles and of pride, which can sometimes be his biggest weakness.

Jack was initially played by Andrew Burt, who appeared in over 100 episodes. Burt left the role in 1973 in order to work in the theatre again. Burt reprised the role in 1976. The role was then recast to Clive Hornby, who first appeared as Jack in 1980. Hornby departed the role due to ill health in 2008.

In 1997, Hornby was filming a scene which included Jack pushing a tractor when he got injured. He was rushed to hospital with a collapsed lung and spent eight days recovering. Speaking of the incident, Hornby said “It’s all right now but it made me realise that I never wanted to spend eight days again in a hospital."

== Storylines ==
=== 1972–1973 ===
Jack returns to Beckindale on the day of Jacob's funeral. He watches the procession from The Woolpack and wanders around the farm. Following the funeral, Jack meets Marian Wilks and then enters the farmhouse and is met with a frosty reception from his sister, Peggy who resents Jack as he has returned to the village for the first time in eight years without a word and has inherited the farm, which has caused bad feeling between her and their brother, Joe. Jack's mother Annie tells him he is welcome to stay but must help. Later, Jack quarrels with Marian when he finds out her father Henry was a partner in a company that poisoned local fish and suggests it may have been done deliberately. Jack agrees to surrender the farm to Peggy but Annie insists Jack makes the farm work. Jack then takes an interest in an old Millhouse which has a preservation order on it and plans to restore it and later reside there. He also has many a heated discussion with Henry over land access. Wallace, a friend of Jack arranges a meeting between him and a mystery woman named Lynn. Around this time, Marian and Jack become close much to Joe's chagrin. When Lynn arrives, everyone is intrigued. Jack reveals that Lynn is his common-law wife from his time in London.

When Ruth, Tom and their children Jackie, Sandie and Tommy arrive in the village, Jack offers Tom a job as a farmhand but regrets it as Tom is proven to be lazy and fires him. Tom retaliates with blackmail, threatening to tell Marian that Jack is the biological father of his son, Jackie. Tom's suspicions come from Jackie's likeness to Jack, sharing the names John Jacob and knowing of Ruth's past relationship with Jack. Jack refuses to give in and fires Tom. Marian finds out and the Merricks leave.

When Jack comes into some money, the family are suspicious of its source and discover Jack wrote a successful novel while in London. Marian is curious and enjoys the book but is ultimately unimpressed with the sexist views. Jack battles with Henry over a piece of land that Harry Jameson (John Glyn-Jones), an old friend of Jacob's, is selling. Harry tries to get them to increase their offers but Jack knows Harry is desperate and he accepts Jack's offer. He consults a solicitor and has the farm shared between Annie, Joe, Peggy and their grandfather, Sam Pearson (Toke Townley) but Sam, not wanting the responsibility, sells his share to Henry. After Peggy dies in October 1973, Jack returns to London.

=== 1980–2008 ===
He returns in February 1980, vowing to stay for good as he wanted to settle down. Ruth, now calling herself "Pat", returns to the village with Jackie (now played by Ian Sharrock) and her daughter, Sandie Merrick (Jane Hutcheson) after leaving Tom for good and reunites with Jack. During this time, Jackie discovers that Jack is his biological father and takes the news badly and there is an unease between the two. In October 1982, Jack and Pat marry but less than two years into the marriage, Jack begins an affair with local newspaper reporter, Karen Moore (Annie Hulley). Pat finds out and demands Jack chooses between her and Karen and he chooses Pat and they reconcile. In 1985, Pat learns she is pregnant and gives birth to Jack's second son, Robert (Richard Smith), on 22 April 1986. Jack is left devastated when Pat dies in a car crash four months later, leaving him to bring up Robert on his own.

Clive Hornby as Jack Sugden after the recast and when he returned in 1980.

After a lengthy period of grieving, Jack begins dating again when he meets mobile librarian, Sarah Connolly (Madeleine Howard), in 1988; Sarah also becomes a mother figure to Robert. Jackie dislikes Sarah at first and feels she is trying to replace Pat but warms to her thanks to intervention from his wife Kathy (Malandra Burrows). Jack is left bitter and angry when Jackie dies in a shooting accident in August 1989 and Sarah is there for him. The couple move in together in 1990, and Jack often proposes but she keeps turning him down. Sarah falls pregnant in 1993 and gives birth to a daughter in March 1994, Victoria (Jessica Heywood) whose crying wakes up Annie, who had been knocked comatose following a plane crash in which Jack became one of the heroes of the hour by helping rebuild the destroyed Skipdale Bridge. Jack and Sarah marry in May 1994 and in the same month the village is renamed Emmerdale.

Jack faces more grief when he learns of Joe's death in a car crash in Spain in June 1995 and is inconsolable and is unable to attend the funeral due to a bad back. Jack and Sarah's marriage is tested when Jack has a fling with Sarah's friend and Jack's former stepniece, Rachel Tate (Glenda McKay) but they reconcile. The Sugdens adopt Andy Hopwood (Kelvin Fletcher) a school friend of Robert (now Christopher Smith). By the end of the 1990s, Jack and Sarah's marriage is in trouble again when Jack suggests Robert and Andy work on the farm rather than attend school and money problems worsen. They take in a lodger, Richie Carter (Glenn Lamont) and Sarah, feeling neglected, begins an affair with Richie and leaves Jack. Sarah gets custody of Victoria (now Hannah Midgley) and Jack gets custody of Robert and Andy. Andy sets the barn on fire to help Jack claim on the insurance but the plan goes wrong when Sarah is killed and Jack is arrested as the chief suspect. Andy comes clean to Richie about the fire and begs him to change his statement and he agrees, resulting in Jack's freedom.

Jack later begins dating Woolpack landlady Diane Blackstock (Elizabeth Estensen). When Andy discovers Robert (now Karl Davies) is having an affair with his wife, Katie (Sammy Winward), he waits for Robert in his caravan with a shotgun, intending to shoot him but accidentally shoots Jack instead. Having almost died, Jack initially disowns Andy but they reconcile and Jack and Diane plan to marry but she reveals that she had colon cancer and undergoes chemotherapy. The couple married and enjoy a honeymoon in Las Vegas while Diane recovered. Further drama ensues when Jack learns Andy is the father of 15-year-old Debbie Dingle's (Charley Webb) daughter, Sarah, but supports Andy when he said he wanted to be a hands-on father, impressed with how responsible Andy had become. After a revenge attempt against Andy for killing Sarah backfires, resulting in the tragic death of Max King (Charlie Kemp), Jack banishes Robert from the village.

Jack and Diane assume responsibility for Andy's half-brother, Daz Eden (Luke Tittensor), as Jack and Sarah did with Andy a decade earlier. Andy and Daz's father, Billy (David Crellin), is released from prison and returns to Emmerdale much to the ire of various residents, having robbed the Post Office and killed Vic Windsor (Alun Lewis) on Christmas Day 1998. During this time, Billy works to prove he has changed and begins an emotional affair with Diane. Diane, riddled with guilt, confesses and she and Jack separate but later reconcile following Victoria (now Isabel Hodgins) discovering of the truth about her mother's death. Jack visits Annie in Spain in 2008 and remains for several months until Annie informs the family of Jack's death of a heart attack on 5 February 2009, leaving them devastated.

Diane brings Jack's body back from Spain, along with his mother Annie, making her first return to her old home in 13 years. Val (Charlie Hardwick) and Eric Pollard (Chris Chittell) arrange his funeral. Jack is buried in the village churchyard. Andy, Daz, Sam (James Hooton) and Zak Dingle (Steve Halliwell) are pallbearers. Just before the service, Alan Turner (Richard Thorp) recalls to Betty Eagleton (Paula Tilbrook) a conversation where Jack had told him about the events of Jacob's funeral. Diane reads a letter Jack had written for Andy, Victoria, Daz and Robert during the service, telling them that he loved them and wanted them to live together as a family and reveals that he knew in his last weeks that he would not live to see the village again. Andy breaks down in tears and flees the church. As Jack is laid to rest, Diane places his chequered cap onto the coffin. Andy sees Robert, who is watching from a distance and drives away. Robert leaves a flower on the grave before leaving again. That afternoon, Val put a framed photo of Jack up next to the pictures of Amos and Henry Wilks in the pub. Andy, Diane, Daz and Victoria visit the grave that night to say a last goodbye. As they walk away, Diane looks back and sees a vision of Jack next to the grave. He smiles at her and she smiles back and realises that Jack will always be with her and the children and would be looking down on them.

== Reception ==
A writer from The Daily Telegraph called Jack a "literary-minded farmer forever battling with his younger brother Joe". Craig Jones from LeedsLive called Jack one of the show's "most iconic characters", whilst Rachel McGrath from HuffPost wrote that the character was "much-loved". Rianne Houghton from Digital Spy called him a "legend" and wrote that he was "considered by many to be a good guy" despite his "occasional inter-marital indiscretions".

In October 2016, Emmerdale aired scenes where Robert (now Ryan Hawley) tells his boyfriend Aaron Dingle (Danny Miller) that Jack had "leathered" him when Robert was 15 years old after catching him with another boy. This revelation divided fans, with some criticising the show's retcon and debating whether Jack would be capable of that action, as well as accusing the show of ruining the character. However, others praised the decision to revealing a less nice side to Jack and thought it was a bold decision. Houghton from Digital Spy did not think that Jack would be abusive and noted that fans were "shocked" and that some were "less than impressed".
