= Fionnuala Ellwood =

Irish actress

Fionnuala Ellwood (born 3 July 1964 in Dublin, Ireland) is an actress best known for portraying Lynn Whiteley in the ITV soap Emmerdale between 1989 and 1994.

== Early life ==
She attended Wilmslow County Grammar School for Girls.

== Career ==
Other appearances include Doctors, Grange Hill, Holby City and Casualty.

Following a successful career in theatre and television, Ellwood raised a family in the 1990s and is now a specialist drama teacher and Advanced Drawing & Talking therapeutic practitioner, working with children and young people.
