= Christopher Smith (English actor) =

English actor and producer (born 1984)

- Born: 15 October 1984 (age 41); Bradford, West Yorkshire, England
- Occupations: Actor, producer
- Years active: 1989–present

Christopher Smith (born 15 October 1984 in Bradford, West Yorkshire, England) is an English actor and producer.

== Career ==
Smith attended Stage 84 drama school in Bradford, where his mother was choreographer, and at the age of four, he was picked from 50 auditionees when Yorkshire Television visited the school searching for a new boy to play Robert Sugden in the ITV soap opera Emmerdale. His father, Richard Smith, also acts and appeared in a minor role in Emmerdale before Smith joined the cast.

Smith is best known for playing Robert Sugden from 1989 until 2001, when he was axed and replaced by Karl Davies. In September 2001, Smith sued Yorkshire Television for unfair dismissal from his part as Robert. The axing was due to the producers' intentions to feature Robert in more adult plots, therefore requiring an older actor for the part. The recasting took place while Robert was off-screen visiting his grandmother, Annie Sugden, in Spain after learning his adoptive brother Andy was responsible for starting the barn fire that killed his stepmother.

Smith currently works as a producer on the acclaimed talk show Talking Dead.
