= Craig McKay (actor) =

English actor

Craig McKay (born 21 June 1973, Guiseley) is an English actor known for playing Mark Hughes in ITV soap opera Emmerdale from 1988 until 1993. His character was killed off in the famous Plane Crash storyline on New Year's Eve 1993.

Craig is the real-life brother of former Emmerdale actress Glenda McKay, who played his on-screen sister, Rachel.
