= Glenda McKay =

British actress

Glenda McKay (born 2 February 1971) is a British actress.

She is best known for playing the character of Rachel Hughes on the ITV soap Emmerdale from 1988 until the character was killed off in 1999, in a memorable scene in which she was pushed off a cliff by Graham Clark.

Glenda's brother Craig McKay starred alongside her in Emmerdale as her screen brother Mark Hughes. McKay has since become an award-winning teacher in West Yorkshire.

In August 2025, McKay made a guest appearance in the ITV soap Coronation Street playing a social worker called Alison Hale who deals with Tim and Sally.
