= Sally Knyvette =

British actress, teacher (born 1951)

- Born: Sally James; 9 February 1951 (age 75); Horsham, Sussex, England
- Occupations: Actress; theatre director; teacher
- Years active: 1972–present
- Known for: Blake's 7 (1978–1979); Emmerdale (1988–1991)

Sally Knyvette (/nɪˈvɛt/ ni-VET) (born 9 February 1951) is a British actress, theatre director, and teacher.

== Early life ==
Born Sally James in Horsham, Sussex, she is the daughter of a doctor.

== Early career ==
Knyvette started acting in repertory theatre for seven years, acting mostly on stage, including playing many Shakespeare roles.

== Television career ==
Knyvette is best known for her roles as Jenna Stannis in the first two series of British science fiction series Blake's 7 (1978–79), and as Kate Sugden in long-running ITV soap opera Emmerdale (1988–91).

In a 1997 interview for the book Blake's 7: The Inside Story Knyvette argued that her that her Blake's 7 role was under-written, and that she and her female co-star Jan Chappell had been sidelined by the show's male production team, saying: "The fact is, we were not given our voices; it's as sad and simple as that." In a 2016 interview, Knyvette said that she left Blake's 7 because "I didn't think the writing was being developed, particularly for the women." However, she also lauded Blake's 7, saying "It's remarkably better than I thought it was in terms of stories. Some of them are really good." After leaving Blake's 7, Knyvette studied for an English and drama degree at the University of London.

Other television appearances include: Who Pays the Ferryman?, Holby City, Family Affairs, A Touch of Frost, Unfinished Business, Casualty, EastEnders, Dalziel and Pascoe, Coronation Street, The Politician's Wife, The Bill, Big Deal, General Hospital, Breakaway Girls and Z-Cars.

== Theatre career ==
Her extensive career in theatre includes two years with Mike Alfreds' company Method and Madness, and most recently playing Goneril for Jonathan Miller.

In 2002 she assisted Jack Gold on directing Twelve Angry Men at the Tricycle Theatre.

In 2004 she directed a production of Are You Now or Have You Ever Been by Eric Bentley at the Tricycle Theatre.

In 2006 she directed a production of Inherit the Wind at the Tricycle Theatre, and a production of Maxim Gorky's Summerfolk at B.A.D.A.

In 2008 she directed To Kill a Mockingbird at the Tricycle Theatre.

In 2010 directed Judgment at Nuremberg at the Tricycle Theatre, and remounted the production at the Bridewell Theatre a year later, followed by productions of A Midsummer Night's Dream at GSA and Hard Times at City Lit.

In 2013 she directed A World Elsewhere by Alan Franks at Theatre503.

In 2022 she played Helen in Five Characters in Search of a Good Night's Sleep, directed by Mike Alfreds at Southwark Playhouse.

In 2022 she played Jean in The Best Exotic Marigold Hotel, directed by Lucy Bailey on a national tour.

Knyvette also works in the corporate sector, and has worked at the Foreign Office and at Ashridge, Britain's leading independent centre for management and organisation development, using her skills a to help individuals develop both "impact and presence" in their corporate presentations.

She regularly works as a voice-over artist. She has voiced many commercials, plus Doctorman Allen in the Doctor Who audio adventure Spare Parts, and the role of Queen Carmilla in the video game Castlevania: Lords of Shadow and its sequel, developed by Mercury Steam. She voiced Emiliana Perfetti in the video game Layton's Mystery Journey, developed by Level-5. She has also reprised her role as Jenna Stannis in the Blake's 7 audio dramas produced by Big Finish Productions, beginning with Blake's 7: Warship.

Knyvette runs Shakespeare workshops in France and London, and teaches privately and at top drama schools.
