= Clive Hornby =

English actor and musician (1944–2008)

- Hornby as Jack Sugden (2007)
- Born: Clive William Hornby; 20 October 1944; Liverpool, England
- Died: 3 July 2008 (aged 63); Leeds, England
- Resting place: Rawdon Crematorium, West Yorkshire
- Education: London Academy of Music and Dramatic Art
- Occupation: Actor
- Years active: 1961–2008
- Known for: Role of Jack Sugden in Emmerdale (1980–2008)
- Spouse: Helen Weir (m. 1984; div. 2000)
- Children: 1

Clive William Hornby (20 October 1944 – 3 July 2008) was an English actor and musician, best known for his role as Jack Sugden in the ITV soap opera Emmerdale. He first appeared in the programme (then named Emmerdale Farm) in 1980, and remained in the role for 28 years.

== Career ==
=== Television ===
Hornby appeared in various television productions including the Royal Air Force National Service sitcom Get Some In!, Space: 1999 and Minder alongside George Cole.

=== Music ===
During the 1960s, Hornby was a drummer with The Dennisons.

== Personal life ==
Hornby was married to Helen Weir, who played his on-screen wife Pat Sugden. They had a son, Thomas, before divorcing in 2000.

== Death ==
Hornby died from cancer on 3 July 2008, aged 63. He had left the soap to battle an illness. His funeral took place on 15 July 2008 at Rawdon Crematorium in Leeds.

Hornby's character Jack Sugden was killed off in February 2009 and the character was given an on-screen funeral. Jack's dialogue from earlier episodes was used as memories for several of the characters. A vision of Jack appeared at the graveside at the end of the episode, which closed with the original Emmerdale Farm theme tune.
