= Madeleine Howard =

British actress

- Born: 15 March 1951 (age 74)
- Occupation: Actress

Madeleine Howard (born 15 March 1951) is a British actress known for her role as Sarah Sugden, from 1988 to 1994 in the soap opera Emmerdale. She has also appeared in other television programmes such as The Bill, Holby City, Doctors, Howards' Way and Gems.
