= Tina Dingle =

- Emmerdale character
- Portrayed by: Jacqueline Pirie (1994–96); Samantha Power (2024)
- Duration: 1994–1996, 2024
- First appearance: 29 December 1994
- Last appearance: 13 November 2024
- Introduced by: Mervyn Watson (1994); Iain MacLeod (2024)
In-universe information
- Occupation: Barmaid; Housekeeper; Personal assistant
- Father: Zak Dingle
- Mother: Nellie Dingle
- Brothers: Nathan Dingle; Ben Dingle; Butch Dingle; Sam Dingle
- Half-brothers: Cain Dingle
- Half-sisters: Belle Dingle
- Sons: Vinny Dingle
- Grandfathers: Jedediah Dingle; Jimmy Lynch
- Grandmothers: Peg Dingle
- Uncles: Albert Dingle
- First cousins: Mandy Dingle; Marlon Dingle; Chas Dingle
- Other relatives: Charity Dingle; Aaron Livesy; Sarah Sugden; Noah Dingle

Tina Dingle is a fictional character from the British television soap opera Emmerdale, originally played by Jacqueline Pirie. She was introduced by producer Mervyn Watson as the fourth and youngest member of the Dingle family. Pirie was 19 when she was cast as 16 year old Tina, and she relocated from Birmingham to Yorkshire for filming. She used a Yorkshire accent for the role, instead of her natural Scottish-Birmingham accent. Pirie was keen to see the viewer's reaction to her character, whom she branded "the bitch from hell". She made her first appearance during the episode broadcast on 29 December 1994. A few months later, Pirie was given a long-term contract. Tina is characterised as a smart, tough, wayward troublemaker. She is flirtatious and wears short skirts and tight tops to attract the boys. Pirie speculated that viewers would hate her character, especially as she becomes more ruthless and manipulative, but she enjoyed playing Tina when she was in "bitch mode". Her first scenes establish that she has been expelled from her school for assaulting a teacher.

Luke McAllister (Noah Huntley) plays an integral part to Tina's early storylines. Prior to her arrival, Luke fights with her brother Ben Dingle (Steve Fury), who dies from a heart condition. The Dingles blame Luke for Ben's death and feud with the McAllister family. Tina and Luke develop a romantic connection after he drives her home one night. Tina schemes to alienate Luke from his friends and family and uses the fact that he is "smitten" with her to her advantage. Tina moves in with Luke, claims she is pregnant and accepts his marriage proposal. She also sells his family heirlooms and fakes a pregnancy scare to ruin an important exam. Huntley believed his character was "hopelessly in love" with Tina and is willing to give everything up for her. During the wedding, Tina reveals that the relationship and the baby were a ruse, as she and her family still blamed him for Ben's death. The storyline leads to Luke's departure from the show, as he forces Tina into his van and speeds through country lanes, before he crashes and dies.

Tina has a short-lived relationship with pub manager Terry Woods (Billy Hartman), which she uses to get away from her family. However, she is devastated when Terry breaks up with her. Pirie was able to show a softer side to Tina, who is genuinely upset by the development. When Terry tries to reconcile, Tina refuses as she does not want the heartache. Pirie said her character develops a distrust of men because of Terry. Towards the end of 1995, Tina is kidnapped by Kenny Dillon (Allan O'Keefe), after her uncle Albert Dingle (Bobby Knutt) steals some jewellery from Kenny's home. Tina makes the most of her luxury surroundings at Kenny's mansion, and has to be dragged home by her father. Following the departure of her mother, Tina becomes responsible for keeping the Dingle men in their place. Pirie described Tina as "the level-headed one" in the family. Tina is employed by Frank Tate (Norman Bowler) as his housekeeper and later personal assistant. He also uses her in his battle with his estranged wife Kim Tate (Claire King). Pirie confirmed that Tina has no romantic feelings for Frank and wants to focus on her career. She forms a relationship with Frank's right-hand man Steve Marchant (Paul Opacic) instead

Pirie quit the role in mid-1996, after deciding not to renew her contract. She later revealed that she was expecting her first child and Tina would be written out of Emmerdale by the end of the year. After her relationship with Steve comes to an end, Tina rejects Frank's proposal and decides to go to London. Her exit aired on 24 December 1996. The character made an unannounced return in October 2024 for the funeral of her father Zak Dingle (Steve Halliwell). The role was recast to Samantha Power, and Pirie later stated that she was not asked to return. Power described the 2024 Tina as "feisty, bolshy, selfish". She said Tina has an agenda and plans to get her hands on the Dingle house. She blackmails her cousin Mandy Dingle (Lisa Riley) into handing over Zak's will, and in a storyline twist, it emerges that Tina is the biological mother of Mandy's adopted son Vinny Dingle (Bradley Johnson). Power made her final appearance as Tina on 13 November 2024, after Tina proves she is not loyal to Vinny.

Pirie received a nomination for Most Popular Newcomer at the National Television Awards in 1995. The character was branded "TV's most vicious bitch", "one of the nastiest characters on the box", and "one of TV's best-loved characters". Pirie thought she would receive hate mail from viewers for her character's behaviour, but she ended up getting praised for her portrayal. Paul Simper from the Radio Times called Tina "one of the great forgotten family members of the Dingle clan". The recast was not well received by viewers due to changes to the character's personality.

== Creation and casting ==
The loud and garish Dingle family were introduced to the show throughout late 1994 and early 1995. Tina was the fourth member to arrive, following her father Zak Dingle (Steve Halliwell) and brothers Ben Dingle (Steve Fury) and Butch Dingle (Paul Loughran). Her mother Nellie Dingle (Sandra Gough) and brother Sam Dingle (James Hooton) later followed. New producer Mervyn Watson was responsible for introducing Nellie and Tina. He cited them as being great examples of how the serial had become more character led than before. Actress Jacqueline Pirie was 19 years old when she was cast as Tina, the youngest member of the family. She relocated from Birmingham to Pudsey, Yorkshire for filming. Pirie commented that she was "going to be the bitch from hell" and was excited to see how viewers reacted to her character. She made her first appearance on 29 December 1994. In March 1995, Pirie confirmed that she had been given a long-term contract and said she would be with the show for at least the rest of the year.

== Development ==
=== Characterisation ===
"Tina picks her victims. She finds the thing that will hurt them most, moves in for the kill and doesn't stop. She has no mercy."

— Pirie describing Tina's behaviour. (January 1995)

The Dingles instantly earn a bad reputation with Zak and Butch causing "havoc" around the village, but Victoria Ross of Inside Soap stated that the women of the family were "more than a match for the men". Ross said Tina is her mother's biggest concern, as she has been expelled from her school for assaulting a teacher, has "an eye for the boys", and brawled with Luke McAllister (Noah Huntley) upon her arrival in the village. Noting her expulsion from school, Pirie said Tina was "a real troublemaker". Tina is seen attending Hotten Comprehensive, where her new teacher is Luke's mother Angharad McAllister (Amanda Wenban). Pirie said that it was certain that Tina would make "life hell for her." Critic Roz Laws of the Birmingham Weekly Mercury dubbed Tina a "16-year-old wild child", and a Daily Mirror reporter branded her a "tough nut schoolgirl" who was going to "create havoc". Ross called Tina "wayward" and "troublesome", while Pirie described her character as "a hard, strong girl and a real flirt", as well as someone she would not like to get on the wrong side of. Another Inside Soap writer overserved that Tina is smart unlike her "half-wit" brothers.

Pirie loved playing a "nasty" character and speculated that viewers would hate her. Pirie's father was also worried about her being abused by the public because of her character's actions. Pirie joked that she could pretend to be someone else, as she puts on a Yorkshire accent for the role, but normally speaks with a Scottish-Birmingham accent. Discussing her character's flirty nature, Pirie said that Tina often wears short skirts and tight tops to get the attention of the local boys. She was glad that she was not at all similar to Tina, especially with her "boy chasing". She called her "a real vixen" and wished that she was as sexy as Tina in real life, but thought she would seem "ridiculous" if she used any of Tina's seductive chat up lines. Pirie later described Tina as "evil, ruthless and manipulative", but said that she liked her. She explained that Tina puts on "a hard front" in order to survive and keeps her vulnerable side hidden. She also loves and will always defend her family. Pirie did not like playing the character's "softer side" as it was boring to her. She stated "Playing the bitch is brilliant – when she goes into her bitch mode, I really get to work."

=== Relationship with Luke McAllister ===
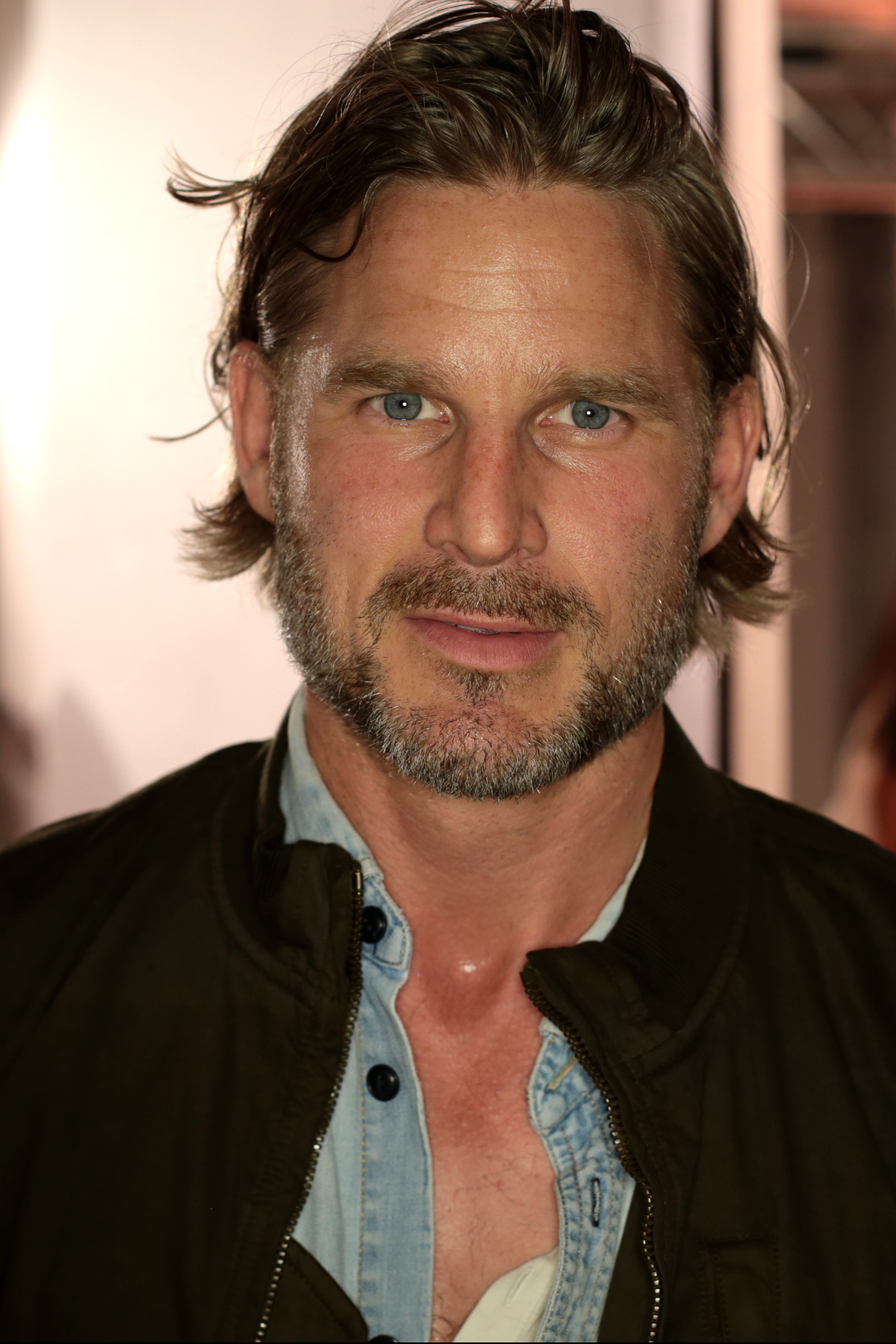
Tina forms a relationship with Luke McAllister, played by Noah Huntley (pictured), before revealing that it was all fake in revenge for her brother's death.

Prior to Tina's arrival, her older brother Ben dies after a fight with Luke McAllister. The Dingles accused Luke of murder and began feuding with the McAllister family, until they learned that Ben died from an undetected heart condition. Tina is initially attracted to Luke, but becomes hostile towards him when she learns who he is. However, in March 1995, writers developed a romantic relationship between them. The storyline starts with Luke offering to drive Tina home, before she turns up at his house wanting to spend the night. Pirie told Ken Irwin of the Daily Mirror that Tina "has become something of a tease" as she and Luke begin "fooling around". As Tina and Luke starting having sex, Pirie was relieved that Emmerdale went out in a family-friendly time slot, so she would not have to "start stripping off for naked scenes". Huntley explained that his character is very attracted to Tina, and that their relationship is mostly physical, as they are "completely in lust". He also said that she brings out Luke's "wild side" and he brings out her "loving, caring side" which she keeps hidden. Victoria Ross of Inside Soap described it as "a modern day Romeo and Juliet story" due to their feuding families.

Tina schemes to alienate Luke from his friends and family beginning with his sister Jessica McAllister (Camilla Power). Ross pointed out that the two characters had previously clashed a number of times, so Jessica is "horrified" to learn that Luke and Tina are dating. Tina later decides to move in with Luke and Pirie believed that it would not come as a surprise if Tina was using Luke to annoy "her arch enemy". The actress told Ross "Tina is a very calculating girl. She lives in a real pigsty whereas he has plenty of money and a nice house so that is one reason she's interested in him. But at least part of her motive for going out with Luke is to irritate Jessica." Pirie reckoned that Luke was so "smitten" with Tina that turning him against his sister would be easy for her. Once she has him on her side, she tries to make everyone else think Jessica is "the devil incarnate". Ross thought that Jessica might have to accept Tina when she reveals that she is pregnant with Luke's child. Continuing with her plan to alienate Luke, Tina causes friction between him and his best friend Biff Fowler (Stuart Wade). After Biff accuses Tina of making romantic advances towards him, Luke asks him to leave his home.

Tina continues scheming and uses the pregnancy to her advantage. She moves in with Luke and accepts his wedding proposal, which elicits a bad reaction from her family. Tina goes on to sell Luke's family heirlooms, spends his money and convinces him to sell his motorbike. On the day of Luke's vital physics A Level exam, Tina calls him and claims she is having stomach pains, causing Luke to skip the exam and rush to her side. Huntley explained that Tina has potentially ruined his character's future, as he needs that A Level to get into Edinburgh University to become a doctor like his father. However, he said Luke is "so hopelessly in love" with Tina that he is willing to give everything up for her, and he also wants to do right by his unborn child. Huntley reckoned Luke had gone soft and said his relationship with Tina was "the most rebellious he's ever been!" Ross (Inside Soap) believed any marriage between Luke and Tina would be short lived as Huntley had announced his departure from Emmerdale in June 1995.

Ahead of the wedding airing in July 1995, Pirie teased a twist to the storyline. She stated "All I'll say is tune in to the wedding of the year. They do make it to the altar and the vicar says his bit but there's a real twist in the tale and I'm not telling you what it is. I haven't even told my best friends what happens at the wedding!" Pirie reckoned that if the couple did not marry, it would be a waste of "some really wonderful planning and preparations". She found that the build up to the ceremony felt like a real wedding, as new Dingle family members were introduced, Dolores Sharp (Samantha Hurst) is Tina's bridesmaid and Biff is Luke's best man. Tina's dress is "tight, white leather" which Pirie admitted she would never wear in real life as it was "so unflattering". She also joked that filming the wedding scenes had put her off weddings forever.

The wedding ends in humiliation for Luke when Tina reveals their relationship and the baby were a ruse, as she and her family still blamed him for Ben's death. Of the twist, Hooton (Sam Dingle) stated "It was a great pay-off for the audience and a great story for us all to play." Luke is "destroyed" by the truth, but tries to win Tina back. After that fails, he kidnaps her and speeds through the country lanes in his van. Tina manages to jump out, shortly before Luke crashes into a tree and dies. The storyline marked Huntley's departure from the serial. On-screen, Tina is blamed for Luke's death and she shows a different to her personality, as she admits that did not want him to die and places flowers on his grave.

=== Terry Woods and kidnap ===
Working as a barmaid in The Woolpack enables Tina to grow close to pub manager Terry Woods (Billy Hartman) and she sets about "wooing" him. Terry is "at a bit of a low ebb" following his wife's departure and Tina uses this to her advantage in order to get away from her family and their home. She moves in with Terry, leading a reporter for the Newcastle Evening Chronicle to observe: "So she's won. She's got her man against the odds and escaped the clutches of her folks back home... not quite." Alan Turner (Richard Thorp) becomes aware of the relationship and gives Terry an ultimatum. Terry ends their relationship, leaving Tina "devastated". An Inside Soap writer believed this was the character's comeuppance for jilting Luke at the altar. The storyline also allowed Pirie to show a softer side to Tina, who is genuinely upset by her newly single status.

Jon Peake of Inside Soap thought that while she would not let it show, Tina "would have died for Terry", but he did not want to know. The storyline is revisited a few months later, as Terry struggles with a succession of bad news, including his ex-wife's pregnancy, a secret son, and financial difficulties. He turns to Tina for "a shoulder to cry on" and tells her he loves her, but Tina "not having any of it". Pirie said that while Tina really loved Terry once, their break up really hurt her and she does not want to go through that kind of heartache again. She continued: "And Tina doesn't trust men now. She doesn't want anyone at the moment, least of all Terry. She just can't forget how badly he treated her." She also opined that Terry would be using Tina to get over his wife, and Tina was just not interested him anymore.

In December 1995, Tina is kidnapped by the villainous Kenny Dillon (Allan O'Keefe). The situation arises after her uncle Albert Dingle (Bobby Knutt) robs Kenny's home and takes some jewellery, which he wants back. Kenny keeps Tina at his mansion, where she makes the most of her luxury surroundings, unaware that she actually has hidden his diamonds and not her family. Pirie was not surprised that her character had landed on her feet, explaining "She's a very shrewd young lady, who always knows exactly what she's doing. When Uncle Albert is eventually arrested for robbery and Zak comes to take Tina home, she decides she doesn't want to go! He has to drag her off kicking and screaming!" Pirie said Kenny's mansion has a snooker room, swimming pool and champagne, so it was no wonder Tina did not want to go back to the "horrible old Dingle house!"

=== Working for Frank Tate ===
Following the departure of Nellie, Tina becomes responsible for keeping the Dingle men in their place. She also has to deal with her trouble making cousin Mandy Dingle (Lisa Riley), who was introduced during the wedding storyline. Pirie described Tina as "the level-headed one" in the Dingle family, especially compared to her brothers. She thought it was "very strange" that Tina shares the same parents as Sam and Butch, and joked that there might be a future storyline there to be explored. Tina secures employment as Frank Tate's (Norman Bowler) personal assistant at Home Farm. Frank initially hires Tina as a housekeeper and helps boost her social standing, as he uses her in his "war" against his estranged wife Kim Tate (Claire King). While running the house, Tina helps herself to items from Kim's wardrobe and wears one of her dresses to the tea room with Frank. Kim's "furious" reaction amounts to revenge for Frank, who later invites Tina to accompany him on a holiday. They become the subject of gossip in the village, with several characters expressing their views on the nature of Frank and Tina's relationship. Kim is also "flabbergasted", while Zak and Frank's son Chris Tate (Peter Amory) try to stop her from going. An Inside Soap columnist reckoned Tina was out for what she can get and thought Kim had a right to worry because if anyone was going to get Frank's money, it would be Tina.

"She realises that you can't marry an old bloke just for money and because he'll give you a good life. If you get yourself in that sort of situation you'll just end up running off with someone like Dave Glover at some stage and you'll get yourself into a real mess. Just look what happened to Kim."

— Pirie on Tina's reluctance to be with Frank.

When asked if her character was hoping for romance with Frank, Pirie told Peake that Tina is happy with the way things are and her career is more important to her than romance. She loves being at Home Farm and she does not want to jeopardise that. Pirie also explained that Tina has moved on from her "old life" and appears to be ashamed of the Dingles. She misses her mother, but she has grown used to not having her around, and while she is close with Mandy, they do not confide in each other, as that is not something Tina does. Throughout Frank and Kim's storyline, Tina does Frank's "dirty work" and is "at his beck and call" in her capacity as his PA, which he rewards her for. They remain friends, until Frank grows lonely and becomes jealous of her friendship with his right-hand man Steve Marchant (Paul Opacic). Pirie believed that Tina is aware that there is the possibility of Frank being attracted to her, saying "Frank is the one bloke who she thought was beyond all that. And the last thing that she's ever wanted was his advances."

Frank tries to hide his feelings, but makes several digs about Steve to Tina, before she discovers the depth of his feelings and throws "a typical Tina tantrum". Pirie stated that her character "storms in and confronts him, demanding an explanation. You know Tina, she takes no nonsense!" However, Tina is aware that she has a good thing going at Home Farm and does not want to jeopardise that. Tina finds herself in a similar position to Kim, who also started out working for Frank before they had an affair and later married. However, an Inside Soap writer pointed out that the difference is that Tina has no plans to "jump into bed with Frank." Pirie agreed, saying that her character has the potential to take Kim's place, but although that might have been something she thought about in the beginning, it is not something she wants now. She also said that Tina has seen how Kim has ended up, so she is aware of what happens if you play around with Frank.

A romantic relationship between Tina and Steve is established at Frank's son's christening, after which they have sex. Pirie told the Inside Soap writer that Steve is "good-looking, very successful, has a nice car, and basically he just goes with everything Tina is at the minute with her success and her job." She thought he was the exact man Tina believed she should be with, noting that her character is always trying to better herself. She also thought that Steve is the only man who can take Tina another step up socially, which is basically the only reason she is with him. The writer observed that while Tina is not following the same path as Kim, she has chosen to take a leaf out of her book and so far things are going her way.

=== Departure ===
On 26 July 1996, Matthew Wright for the Daily Mirror reported that Pirie had quit her role, after she decided not to renew her contract, which ended on 20 December. She was one of three actors to announce their departure, along with Claire King (Kim Tate) and Ian Kelsey (Dave Glover). On 23 November 1996, Pirie confirmed she had quit her role as she was expecting her first child. Pirie confirmed that her character would be written out of the serial by the end of the year. She believed she would be unemployable after leaving Emmerdale due to typecasting, so she put three quarters of her paycheques aside. She stated "The character of Tina Dingle is so powerful that I know I am going to be associated with her for a long time to come." On-screen, Tina and Steve's relationship comes to an end after he accuses Tina of betraying him by telling Frank about a holdings company he owns. This also prompts Tina to stand up to Frank, before they reconcile their friendship at a conference. However, Frank then proposes to Tina, who turns him down, having only ever seen him as her boss. Tina becomes fed up of being used by Frank and leaves the "chaos of Home Farm" for London during the episode broadcast on 24 December 1996. The character received sporadic mentions by her on-screen family since her departure.

=== Return ===
Following Steve Halliwell's death in December 2023, producers decided to kill off his character and hold an on-screen funeral featuring the Dingle family in October 2024. While appearing on Lorraine, Jeff Hordley, who plays Zak's son Cain Dingle, teased the arrival of a mystery family member, whose portrayer was a friend and someone that he had worked with before. During the Emmerdale episode broadcast on 17 October, Tina was reintroduced with the role recast to actress Samantha Power. She told Laura Denby of the Radio Times that she was nervous about taking on "an iconic role" and that her first scenes were at Zak's graveside with the whole Dingle family. She particularly enjoyed working with Riley (Mandy), whom she met at the screen test for the role. Power also paid tribute to Pirie's portrayal of the character, saying "She was absolutely fantastic, I remember her character vividly! So I am very lucky to get the chance to pick up where she left off!" Pirie, who now goes by her married named of Chadwick, commented on the recast after the character's return scenes aired. She revealed that she had not been asked to return to the role. She wished Power "all the best" and told her to have fun.

Power described the 2024 Tina as "feisty, bolshy, selfish". She also said Tina has an agenda, "no filters" is not to be trusted, especially when it comes to getting her hands on the Dingle house. Tina's scenes establish that she has been in contact with Mandy over the years, which is how she learns that Zak's funeral is taking place at the Dingle farm. Tina proceeds to insult her family, before stating that she has a right to a share of the family home, until Lydia Dingle (Karen Blick) tells her that Zak's will says otherwise. Tina, who is wearing an ankle tag, is then arrested for being in breach of her release conditions. Denby observed that Tina's appearance seemed to be "a flying visit" and Power told her that she would love to return.

Tina returns to the village the following month and blackmails Mandy into handing over Zak's will. Tina's presence "stirs up more trouble" for the Dingle family, as she moves her caravan next to Wishing Well Cottage and maintains that she has a right to the family home. Lily Shield-Polyzoides of Inside Soap pointed out that Tina shows no remorse towards the Dingles and branded her "the devil on their doorstep". Sam notices Zak's will has gone missing at the same time Mandy hands it over to Tina in order to keep a big secret. A show spokesperson told Shield-Polyzoides that the will is "a crucial record" that Zak wanted Sam, Cain and Belle Dingle (Eden Taylor-Draper) to own the cottage. Mandy's son Vinny Dingle (Bradley Johnson) causes her frustration when he comments that Tina appears to be in the village for family not money, while Tina tries to convince a drunken Sam to sell up.

In a storyline twist, it emerges that Tina is Vinny's biological mother. As Tina continues to make threats, Mandy tries to get rid of her by moving her caravan to a field and demanding that she leaves forever. However, Tina returns to the Dingle home and tells Vinny the truth. Johnson explained that his character is "distraught" when Tina admits she is his birth mother, as it means everything he has been told by Mandy is a lie. As Mandy and Tina get into a physical fight, Vinny walks off and the other Dingles confront Mandy. The following day, Tina tries talking with Vinny as she feels guilty for abandoning him. Johnson said Vinny hatches a plan in order to test her loyalty. He told Inside Soap's Chloe Timms: "Vinny plays a little game with Tina and gives her an ultimatum. He's playing her at his own game. He offers her £50,000 to leave the village for good and return Zak's will, or don't take it and spend time with her son..." Johnson told Timms that Vinny would be "really upset" if Tina took the money. He said she was not the "nicest of characters" but Vinny hopes she will stay around and try to be his mother.

Power made her final appearance as Tina on 13 November 2024. Olivia Wheeler of the Manchester Evening News commented that "in classic soap opera fashion" Tina decides to take the money, however, she finds the envelope to be empty, proving to Vinny that she is "a deceitful liar who cannot be trusted". Tina's actions anger her brothers and Cain sets her caravan on fire, leading Tina with no choice but to leave.

== Reception ==
For her portrayal of Tina, Pirie received a nomination for Most Popular Newcomer at the 1st National Television Awards in 1995. Ahead of Tina's introduction, a writer for Inside Soap quipped "Tina Dingle is about to become the real brat in the Emmerdale Brat Pack". Ken Irwin of the Daily Mirror called Tina "TV's most vicious bitch". During a review of the show's 2000th episode, Aidan Smith of the Daily Record said the Dingles were "on top form" and praised Tina, writing "Quite how this bonkers brood can have produced a daughter like Tina (Jacqueline Pirie) is beyond me. Thick she most certainly isn't. Tina the Tormentor is a girl who knows what she's got – and how to use it."

A columnist for All About Soap placed Tina and Luke's wedding at number seven on their "20 greatest soap weddings" list. They stated: "The Dingles and McAllisters were about to become related – until Tina halted things and revealed she was only interested in making Luke pay for the death of her brother Ben. Luke, unable to live with the shame, killed himself a few days later." While viewing Tina's seduction of Terry, a critic from the Newcastle Evening Chronicle called her "the young pretender to the crown of Queen Bitch of Soaps". They wrote: "She may be sexy, manipulative and as hard as the hobs of hell but Tina Dingle has got a lot to do to oust the lives of ex-Coronation Street bitch Tanya and a host of other former holders of the crown."

Television critic Roz Laws wrote that Tina could "win medals for malice", and branded her a "superbitch" and "one of the nastiest characters on the box." Pirie expected to receive abuse and hate mail from viewers for her character's behaviour, but she ended up getting praised for her portrayal from viewers she met in the streets. Pirie was surprised by the positive reaction to her character and even received fanmail from male viewers asking her out on dates. She commented "People still think I'm a real bitch, but everyone seems to love Tina because she is such a nasty, scheming little so-and-so." After Terry broke up with her, a critic for the Halifax Evening Courier stated "Tempestuous Tina Dingle gets a taste of her own medicine in ITV's Emmerdale. Well used to twisting the knife herself, it's her turn to be on the receiving end when Woolpack manager Terry tells her their relationship is finished."

Victoria Ross (Inside Soap) quipped "nobody but scheming Tina Dingle could turn a hostage situation into a holiday!" Jon Peake called her "the downmarket temptress" and "one of TV's best-loved characters". Soaplife's Ellie Genower wrote "Manipulative and malicious, there was only one thing that vixen Tina Dingle cared about in life and that was herself." Including Tina in her "wild women of Emmerdale" feature, Sue Smith of the Daily Mirror stated "With skirts too short, tops too low and make-up too bright, Tina breezed into Emmerdale in a cloud of cheap scent and cheaper sexuality. Determined to raise her head above the Dingles' mucky parapet, she set about seducing boss Frank Tate while also turning the power of her pout on Dave Glover. But Tina got cold feet when Frank actually proposed and headed off to Coronation Street."

In 1998, a feature in Inside Soap called for the character's return. They described her as "the bitchy daughter of Zak and Nellie, whose combination of guile and Dingle cunning made her the perfect match for Kim Tate." The writers observed that over time Tina managed to reinvent herself as a "high-flying businesswoman." Paul Simper from the Radio Times called Tina "one of the great forgotten family members of the Dingle clan". He also wrote "Tina could wrap men round her little finger but was a romantic at heart."

The 2024 recast was not well received by viewers due to changes to the character's personality. Carena Crawford from Emmerdale Insider observed that fans "have failed to warm to her" as she is so far removed from the original character. Recalling Tina's earlier storylines and behaviour, Crawford stated that the old Tina was "as far as Dingles go, quite classy. But not so this new version. Her personality and behaviour, not to mention her clothes, are a far cry from the old Tina. The Tina who arrived in the Dales to get justice for her brother's death, that was a true Dingle through and through and would never blackmail them for money; that Tina."
