= List of Emmerdale characters introduced in 1993 =

Emmerdale is a British soap opera first broadcast on 16 October 1972. The following is a list of characters that first appeared in 1993, by order of first appearance. All characters were introduced by either Morag Bain or Nicholas Prosser, the show's series producers. The first character Shirley Foster was introduced in May as a new love interest for Alan Turner. Two new Southern families were also introduced, the Windsors and the McAllisters, in August and December, respectively. American wine merchant Josh Lewis began appearing in September.

== Debbie Buttershaw ==
Debbie Buttershaw
- Emmerdale character
- Portrayed by: Rebecca Joy Gilgan
- First appearance: 23 March 1993
- Last appearance: 25 November 1993
- Introduced by: Morag Bain

Debbie Buttershaw, played by Rebecca Joy Gilgan, was the girlfriend of Mark Hughes (Craig McKay) who had to fight against Lorraine Nelson for Mark's affections. Mark chose Debbie and they became a couple. Debbie then developed an addiction to running and began to not eat properly, causing her to collapse and admitted to Mark that the health scare had frightened her and promised him that she would ease off the running and eat properly.

== Shirley Turner ==
Shirley Turner
- Emmerdale character
- Portrayed by: Rachel Davies
- Duration: 1993–1994
- First appearance: 13 May 1993
- Last appearance: 7 June 1994
- Introduced by: Morag Bain
In-universe information
- Occupation: Drop-in centre worker Barmaid
- Husband: Alan Turner (1994)
- Sons: Laurie Foster
- Daughters: Sandie Foster; Debbie Foster

Shirley Turner (née Foster), played by Rachel Davies, made her debut screen appearance in 1993.

Shirley meets Alan Turner (Richard Thorp) and they begin dating. However, when Alan learns that she used to be a prostitute, he ends their relationship. Shirley is shocked when the Drop-In Centre where she works is faced with closure. She seeks help from Alan and their romance is "ignited" once again. A writer for Inside Soap said "Alan only has eyes for Shirley" and he makes plans for her to be landlady of his pub, The Woolpack.

While working at a Drop-In Centre, Shirley meets Alan Turner and she initially finds him to be arrogant. Alan is affected by the death of one of the homeless girls who use the centre and Shirley warms to him. They begin dating and Alan is shocked when he discovers that Shirley used to be a prostitute. The Drop-in centre closes and Alan gives Shirley a job at The Woolpack. Shirley helps Alan refurbish the pub after the plane crash and they get married. A few months later, Shirley and Viv Windsor (Deena Payne) are taken hostage by Reg Dawson (Niven Boyd) who had robbed the post office. Reg and his accomplices go to Home Farm and barricade themselves in. When Reg is about to shoot Viv, Shirley jumps in front of her, taking the bullet and dying.

== Vic Windsor ==
Vic Windsor, played by Alun Lewis, made his debut screen appearance on 10 August 1993. Vic married Viv Dawson (Deena Payne) and they had two daughters together; Kelly (Adele Silva) and Donna (Verity Rushworth). The couple ran the village shop and post office. Lewis was axed by series producer Keiran Roberts in 1998 and Vic was killed during an armed robbery by Billy Hopwood (David Crellin).

== Viv Hope ==
Viv Hope (also Windsor), played by Deena Payne, made her first appearance on 10 August 1993. Viv was Vic Windsor's (Alun Lewis) second wife and the stepmother of his daughter Kelly Windsor (Adele Silva). She also had a son Scott Windsor (Ben Freeman) with her first husband, and Donna Windsor (Verity Rushworth) with Vic. The Windsors move to the village from Essex to run the local post office. Viv and Vic have an unhappy marriage, which later resulted in Viv's affair with Terry Woods (Billy Hartman). Lance Parkin described the character as "a sharp-tongued and often vicious gossip".

== Josh Lewis ==
Josh Lewis
- Emmerdale character
- Portrayed by: Peter Warnock
- Duration: 1993–1994
- First appearance: 14 September 1993
- Last appearance: 13 January 1994
- Introduced by: Morag Bain
In-universe information
- Occupation: Wine merchant

Josh Lewis, played by Peter Warnock, made his debut screen appearance in 1993. Josh was a "smoothtalking American wine merchant". Josh begins a "passionate, adulterous" affair with Kathy Tate (Malandra Burrows), but when she decides to give her marriage to Chris Tate (Peter Amory) another go she tells Josh to leave. Josh goes to the South of France for a while, but he returns and Kathy is forced to choose between him and Chris. Of Josh and Kathy, Burrows told a reporter for Inside Soap "The great thing about Josh is that he sees Kathy as herself, not as a possession. He arrived on the scene when Chris was at his worst and you must remember that she wasn't looking for an affair." Burrows opined that Kathy would hate to leave her family and the village for Josh. The actress added "there's no way that she and Josh could live happily ever after in Beckindale – the gossips would have a field day!" Jaci Stephen of the Daily Mirror called Josh a "nice American chap". A columnist for Inside Soap named Josh and Kathy's relationship as one of the "Hot affairs of the Dales".

While going through marital problems, Kathy Tate meets and falls for Josh, a wine merchant who begins stopping of at The Woolpack. Kathy finds Josh is the opposite to her husband Chris and they begin an affair. Kathy later agrees to run away with Josh. While on his way to pick up Kathy, a plane strikes the village and Josh finds his way blocked. He helps to repair a damaged bridge, which allows the fire and ambulance services to reach the village. Josh gains the respect many of the residents for helping out. When he reaches the village, Josh notices Kathy's concern for Chris who is trapped in some wreckage. He realises their plan to run away together is over and he goes to her house to hide her cases and remove her farewell note. Josh is spotted by a police officer and detained by him, until Zoe Tate (Leah Bracknell) vouches for his identity. Josh later leaves the village alone.

== Luke McAllister ==
Luke McAllister
- Emmerdale character
- Portrayed by: Noah Huntley
- Duration: 1993–1995
- First appearance: 14 December 1993
- Last appearance: 1 August 1995
- Introduced by: Nicholas Prosser
In-universe information
- Occupation: Student
- Father: Bernard McAllister
- Mother: Angharad McAllister
- Sisters: Jessica McAllister

Luke McAllister, played by Noah Huntley, made his first appearance on 14 December 1993. Luke was introduced along with his parents Bernard (Brendan Price) and Angharad McAllister (Amanda Wenban), and younger sister Jessica McAllister (Camilla Power). An Inside Soap columnist described Luke as being "a cool dude but no bimbo, even if he can be a bit naive at times." They also said that he likes riding around the countryside on his trailbike and would "set a few hearts aflutter" when he joins the local school. Luke and Jessica were part of the show's new "brat pack", along with Biff Fowler (Stuart Wade) and Dolores Sharp (Samantha Hurst). They were credited with giving the soap "a whole new look", and their friendship and romantic storylines also become popular with viewers. After two years in the role, Huntley decided to leave Emmerdale in 1995. He admitted that he would miss the show, but not the attention that came with the role.

Luke moves to Emmerdale with his mother, father and sister. When the Dingle family move to the village, Ben Dingle (Steve Fury) starts a fight with Luke at a rave, during which Ben dies. The Dingles believe that Luke murdered Ben and they make his life difficult. It eventually emerges that Ben had a heart defect. The Dingles refuse to believe this, theorising that the McAllisters have hidden evidence, considering that one of the doctors who examined Ben's body is Luke's father. A feud between the two families begins.

Luke meets Ben's sister Tina Dingle (Jacqueline Pirie) at a dance and he falls in love with her. They date and Tina later tells Luke that she is pregnant, much to the dismay of both families. They agree to get married, but on the day Tina reveals to Luke and the wedding guests that she does not love him, there is no baby, and it was all in aid of revenge for Ben. Luke is badly affected by the revelations. Tina makes things worse when she insults him the following week. Luke eventually snaps, and he pushes Tina into Dave Glover's (Ian Kelsey) van and takes her for an insane ride around Emmerdale. She manages to jump from the van while it is travelling at high speed, just before Luke loses control and crashes into a tree. The van explodes and kills him instantly.

== Angharad McAllister ==
Angharad McAllister
- Emmerdale character
- Portrayed by: Amanda Wenban
- Duration: 1993–1995
- First appearance: 14 December 1993
- Last appearance: 16 February 1995
- Introduced by: Nicholas Prosser
In-universe information
- Occupation: Teacher
- Husband: Bernard McAllister
- Sons: Luke McAllister
- Daughters: Jessica McAllister

Angharad McAllister, played by Amanda Wenban, made her debut screen appearance in December 1993. Former Families actress Amanda Wenban was cast in the role of matriarch Angharad. A writer for Inside Soap described Angharad as a "middle-class mum". The character moves to Beckindale with her family and takes up a teaching position at the local school. Of Angharad, Wenban said "She's a lot closer to me as a person that Jackie was in Families. Angharad is far more conservative, not tight lipped or anything, but a bit more admonishing." When Luke is blamed for the death of Ben Dingle (Steve Fury), a feud between the Dingle and McAllister families begins. As it continues, Angharad starts to feel the strain and Wenban said she is getting to the end of her tether. The Dingles start a fight with Luke at the school and Angharad is taken to task over the matter by the headmaster. Inside Soap's Victoria Ross said Angharad did not have much to smile about and things looked like they would get worse for her and her family before they got better. Of the situation with Luke, Wenban told Ross "Mums are often the soft touch as far as their sons are concerned and Angharad loves Luke to bits – so she must be suffering." Wenban added the family were being given a real testing. Ross said the mother would have to "toughen up and fight tooth and nail" for her job and reputation.

Angharad arrives in the village with her husband Bernard (Brendan Price) and their two children, Jessica (Camilla Power) and Luke (Noah Huntley). She takes a position at the local comprehensive school and helps out during the aftermath of the plane crash. Angharad and Bernard became respected by the village residents and they both helped out with Alan Turner's (Richard Thorp) wedding preparations. During a benefit night, Angharad took to the stage to cavort with the semi-clad "Nobbies", an all-male stripper act. Luke is blamed for the death of Ben Dingle and feud between the Dingles and McAllisters begins. When Angharad realises she has to teach Tina Dingle (Jacqueline Pirie), she and Bernard become fed up of the feud and decide to leave Emmerdale and return to London.

== Jessica McAllister ==
Jessica McAllister
- Emmerdale character
- Portrayed by: Camilla Power
- Duration: 1993–1995
- First appearance: 14 December 1993
- Last appearance: 17 August 1995
- Introduced by: Nicholas Prosser
In-universe information
- Occupation: Fashion student
- Father: Bernard McAllister
- Mother: Angharad McAllister
- Brothers: Luke McAllister

Jessica McAllister, played by Camilla Power, made her debut screen appearance in December 1993. Jessica is the youngest member of the McAllister family. A writer for Inside Soap said Jessica's family moved to Beckindale to put an end to her relationship with a "tearaway" named Danny. They added "But it looks like her passion for Danny Boy is far from fizzling out!" Jessica begins a relationship with Biff Fowler (Stuart Wade) and she decides to lose her virginity to him. A Inside Soap reporter said "In true soap style things don't go quite according to plan and Jessica's deflowering turns into a complete nightmare." Jessica and Biff's night is interrupted, but they eventually find a moment alone together and Jessica has sex with Biff for the first time.

Jessica arrived in the village with her family. She had been engaged to a man called Danny, but her parents disapproved of the relationship and thought Danny was undesirable. The McAllisters believed that moving to Emmerdale would put some distance between them and Jessica started dating her brother's friend Biff Fowler. Jessica was bullied at school by Tina Dingle (Jacqueline Pirie) who blamed Jessica's brother, Luke (Noah Huntley), for the death of her brother Ben (Steve Fury). Tina stirred things up by telling her brother Butch (Paul Loughran) that Jessica was secretly in love with him. This led to Biff and Butch fighting in The Woolpack. When her parents decided to leave the village Jessica refused to go and ran off with Biff. Jessica lost her virginity to him, but later returned to her parents and went back to London with them. In April 1995, she visited Luke who had stayed behind and was outraged to discover that he and Tina were now in a relationship. Jessica rang Tina's father, Zak (Steve Halliwell), and told him about the relationship and he tried to force Tina to come home, but she told him she was pregnant. After Luke's death, Jessica made one last visit to the village before leaving for good.

Dave Lanning of The People said Power was "scandalously wasted" during the time she played Jessica.

== Bernard McAllister ==
Bernard McAllister
- Emmerdale character
- Portrayed by: Brendan Price
- Duration: 1993–1995
- First appearance: 16 December 1993
- Last appearance: 16 February 1995
- Introduced by: Nicholas Prosser
In-universe information
- Occupation: General practitioner
- Wife: Angharad McAllister
- Sons: Luke McAllister
- Daughters: Jessica McAllister

Bernard McAllister, played by Brendan Price, made his debut screen appearance in December 1993. Price revealed he was "delighted" with his new role and that he had rented a cottage minutes from the set, meaning he did not get to see his family often who were in Spain.

Bernard and his family move to Beckindale, so he can set up a new doctor's surgery. Shortly after their arrival, Bernard has his work cut out for him when a plane crash occurs in the village. Of his first year in the village, Victoria Ross of Inside Soap said "If Dr Bernard McAllister moved his family to Emmerdale for a quiet life, he picked the wrong village! In just one year tending the sick and needy, Bernard has patched up plane crash casualties, bandaged the victims of an armed raid and seen his only son framed for murder." Kathy Tate (Malandra Burrows) comes to Bernard for advice after discovering her husband has been cheating on her and Price said she develops a crush on him. The actor called it "a Fatal Attraction type of thing" and said Kathy misunderstands Bernard's medical concern for something more and she falls in love with him. When Kathy's mother see Bernard comforting her daughter, the scandal spreads throughout the village. Despite Bernard's attempts to resist Kathy's advances, he has a tough job proving it to his wife. Price explained "Bernard is in love with his wife, but he is a little attracted to Kathy – after all, she's a lovely looking young woman!" Price added that he would not like the McAllisters to be torn apart, calling them a lovely family.

Bernard moves to Beckindale with his wife Angharad (Amanda Wenban) and their two teenage children: Jessica (Camilla Power) and Luke (Noah Huntley). Bernard sets up a doctor's surgery and Kathy Tate develops a crush on him, following the end of her marriage. Luke gets in a fight with Ben Dingle (Steve Fury) at a rave and Ben dies. This leads to a feud with the Dingle family. The doctor who examines Ben's body is a friend of Bernard and he concludes that Ben died from a heart defect. The Dingles start to believe that the McAllisters have destroyed evidence and try to make the family's lives as difficult as possible. Bernard and Angharad become fed up and leave the village for London. Luke stays behind to finish his A Levels and he begins a relationship with Ben's sister, Tina (Jacqueline Pirie). They get engaged and Bernard refuses to attend the wedding. Luke dies after a car accident and Bernard plans for him to be buried in London, so he does not have to set foot in the village again.
