= Mandy Dingle =

Fictional character from Emmerdale

- Emmerdale character
- Portrayed by: Lisa Riley
- Duration: 1995–2001, 2019–present
- First appearance: Episode 1992; 20 July 1995
- Introduced by: Keith Richardson (1995, 2001); Jane Hudson (2019)
- Spin-off appearances: The Dingles Down Under (1997); The Dingles in Venice (1999)
In-universe information
- Occupation: Barmaid; Beautician
- Father: Caleb Dingle
- Mother: Vera-Lynn Dingle
- Husband: Butch Dingle (1998–1999); Paddy Kirk (1999–2001, 2024–present)
- Adoptive sons: Vinny Dingle
- Stepdaughters: Eve Dingle
- Uncles: Zak Dingle; Shadrach Dingle; Albert Dingle; Ezra Dingle
- First cousins: Butch Dingle; Sam Dingle; Cain Dingle; Chas Dingle; Tina Dingle; Marlon Dingle; Belle Dingle; Eli Dingle
- Other relatives: Charity Dingle; Debbie Dingle; Sarah Sugden; Jack Sugden; Aaron Dingle; Nate Robinson; Kyle Dingle; Isaac Dingle; Eve Dingle; Frankie Robinson; Layla Sugden

Mandy Dingle is a fictional character from the British ITV soap opera Emmerdale, played by Lisa Riley. She made her first appearance during the episode broadcast on 20 July 1995 and departed on 28 September 2000. She returned briefly from 16–26 November 2001. After seventeen years, Riley agreed to reprise the role in late 2018 brief stint, and made her on-screen return on 4 January 2019, and departed after three episodes on 8 January. On 10 July 2019, it was announced that Riley would be returning on a permanent basis, and Mandy reappeared from 12 September 2019. Riley took a brief break at the end of 2025 in order to appear on I'm A Celebrity. Her last appearance was 29 December 2025. She made virtual appearances on 16 & 26 January 2026 respectively, before returning on-screen on 17 February 2026.

== Casting and characterisation ==
Riley made her first appearance as Mandy in 1995, for her on-screen cousin Tina Dingle's wedding to Luke McAllister. The character proved to be popular with viewers, so producers invited Riley to return as a full-time cast member the following year. Riley recalled that someone told her "there's a Mandy Dingle on everyone's street", which she agreed with. Riley stated that Mandy "always says what people are thinking", and that "there's no nonsense with her". She also described Mandy as funny, camp and "in your face". She admitted that her character "could make you cry", and can come across as a manipulator, but refused the label, stating: "she's got such a big heart – she's a survivor, she'll do anything for her family, and if it means telling a few porky pies along the way, which she does, she'll do it because she wants to survive, and more often than not she has done." Riley explained in 2020 that Mandy's "vulnerable side" would be explored, and that it would "open a massive can of worms".

== Development ==
=== Departure ===
In June 2000, Riley confirmed that she had decided to quit the show in order to pursue further television work. As the scriptwriters were plotting her exit scenes, Riley and the cast were "sworn to secrecy". However, Riley admitted that the storyline would be "heart-rending" and thought that viewers would need tissues as it airs. She also commented, "Mandy Dingle has made me who I am and I love my job so it will be a painful leaving. It's very scary. I could end up selling socks!" The characters exit was originally broadcast on 28 September 2000. However she returned to the show briefly between 16 and 26 November 2001.

=== Reintroduction (2019) ===
On 13 November 2018, it was announced that Riley had agreed to reprise the role, with Mandy making her return in early 2019. Of her return, Riley stated "I could not be happier to be returning in the New Year to Emmerdale. It's something I never thought would happen after 17 years, and I am so interested to see what trouble Mandy is capable of causing. But mostly being back with all my old friends, it's like I've never been away." Mandy's return storyline will be "self-contained", and her arrival will "cause trouble" for her family, as she is hiding a secret. Producer Kate Brooks added that Mandy "certainly ruffles a few feathers during her short stint back in the village, and she clearly hasn't lost any of the joie de vivre that made Mandy so popular and enjoyable to watch."

Mandy returns during the episode broadcast on 4 January 2019. She arrives unexpectedly for her cousin Marlon Dingle's (Mark Charnock) wedding to Jessie Grant (Sandra Marvin). Her former husband Paddy Kirk (Dominic Brunt) is "uncomfortable by her presence" when she acts as a witness alongside him. Paddy's partner Chas Dingle (Lucy Pargeter) later fights with Mandy outside the church. Riley commented that once she learned that a stunt coordinator would be involved, she knew that Mandy was back. The actress also explained where Mandy has been, saying "She's been living in Southampton for the past 17 years with her son – who's called Vinny (Bradley Johnson) – and she's been very happy. She's got a bit of money now, and she isn't as downtrodden as she once was. But she's not been invited to the wedding!" On 10 July 2019, it was announced that Riley would be returning once again on a permanent basis, and Mandy reappeared on 12 September 2019. Riley described it as "amazing, absolutely wonderful" to be back filming for Emmerdale, and that she is "loving every second". She also confirmed that she wants to stay on the soap for a long tenure. Riley stated that Mandy needs "a good old-fashioned job in the village", opining that employment would be good for her character. She also stated that Mandy should apologise to and thank her family.

=== Relationship with Vinny and Paul ===
Mandy returns with Vinny, who is initially said to be her son. However, later scenes reveal that he is Mandy's adoptive son. Riley was asked if she knew who his biological parents were, but she admitted that she knew nothing more than viewers. She said: "I'm yet to find that out – it's all still to unfold". It is later revealed that Paul is Vinny's father, and Riley explained that Mandy "knows what Paul is capable of" due to their backstory. This leads Mandy to force a distance between the pair, since she "doesn't want to lose Vinny". Riley expected people to want Mandy to give Paul a second chance, but she affirmed that her character "knows how bad Paul has been", and that their history is complex. She confirmed that there would be long-term drama as part of the story, and that the viewers will eventually see how bad Paul is, labelling Paul as a "manipulator". In scenes aired in 2020, Mandy opens up to both Paul and Vinny about a miscarriage she suffered in the past, and her subsequent infertility. Riley expressed her elation at being able to cover the story, since she has dealt with IVF not working in her personal life, and how it causes people to "treat you differently".

It is established that Paul has a gambling addiction, and though he attempts to quit, he continues to gamble without Mandy and Vinny's knowledge. Riley confirmed that the story would have "darkness", and would question viewers as to how they could deal with the situation, since it throws such an "unbelievable curveball" at Mandy. Vinny discovers Paul is gambling, and lies to Mandy about it. Riley explains that this is to reflect real-life situations, as the production team did heavy amounts of research for the storyline. She explained that "a child starts living a lie as they are fearful of losing their family unit", which Vinny is an example of. She states that "Paul is like any addict and will go to any lengths to feed that addiction". and adds that she is "invested" in the story as a viewer herself. Paul "comes clean" to Mandy about the gambling, and as a result, Riley states that Mandy "feels totally manipulated by Paul", and confirms that her character "has no care" for him anymore, and "wants no remnants of him" in her life. Paul also abuses Vinny several times as a result of his addiction, which he does not tell Mandy. Riley states that if Mandy found out, she would murder Paul. She explains: "[Mandy] would kill for Vinny and would have the Dingle mafia behind her. Paul knows that. There would be no coming back. If and when she finds out, that is the end of everything."

== Storylines ==
=== 1995–2001 ===
Mandy comes to Emmerdale for her cousin Tina Dingle's (Jacqueline Pirie) wedding to Luke McAllister (Noah Huntley). She later returns to live with her uncle Zak Dingle (Steve Halliwell), having been disowned by her father, Caleb Dingle (Mike Kelly). She finds work as a barmaid at The Woolpack, where her feisty personality makes her an instant hit with the locals. Mandy is initially very promiscuous but the arrival of vet Paddy Kirk (Dominic Brunt) proves to be a turning point in Mandy's life. She falls in love with Paddy and is willing to settle down and get married, but their romance suffers problems. Mandy's cousin Butch Dingle (Paul Loughran) overhears Paddy ridiculing their family and he tells Mandy, who orders Paddy out of her house. Paddy leaves for Ireland where he has a job and returns to the village the following month. He and Mandy reconcile after he apologises to her family.

Paddy's mother, Barbara Kirk (Judi Jones), disapproves of Mandy and, convincing her that she will only make Paddy miserable if they marry, pays Mandy to marry her cousin, Butch Dingle, instead. Butch had always been in love with Mandy and readily accepts his cousin's proposal, marrying her in a secret registry office ceremony. However, despite trying to make her marriage work, Mandy cannot ignore the fact that she truly loves Paddy and they begin an affair. Butch is livid when he discovers the truth and the Dingle family disowns Mandy for her infidelity, although her uncle Zak and his wife Lisa Dingle (Jane Cox) eventually come round after Paddy delivers their unexpected daughter, Belle (James and Emily Mather). Following her divorce from Butch, Mandy marries Paddy. However, Mandy soon begins feeling inferior as Paddy is a university graduate and she is just a barmaid. With Paddy's encouragement, Mandy enrols in a college course in Hotten, but this proves to be the downfall in their marriage. Whilst at college, Mandy becomes attracted to her lecturer and they eventually embark on an affair. However, when she discovers that her lecturer is only using her for sex, a distraught and guilt-ridden Mandy comes clean to a devastated Paddy. With their marriage over, Mandy then departs the village to live with her best friend, Kelly Windsor (Adele Silva), in London. She returns briefly the following year in order to win Paddy back after realising the mistake she had made but seeing that he is happy and settled with post office worker Emily Dingle (Kate McGregor), Butch's widow, Mandy leaves the village again.

=== 2019–present ===
17 years later, Mandy returns to the village for the wedding of her cousin, Marlon Dingle (Mark Charnock) and Jessie Grant (Sandra Marvin) despite not being invited. She has her adoptive son Vinny (Bradley Johnson) with her. After the wedding, Mandy catches up with Paddy. She stays at the Dingles' farm, but Marlon and Sam Dingle (James Hooton) wonder why she is back, and Sam warns her not to cause trouble. Mandy and Chas Dingle (Lucy Pargeter) have a fight over Paddy, but Mandy reveals she is not back for Paddy. Mandy and Chas later have a heart to heart and Mandy gives Chas a letter that Paddy needs to see. Mandy is later caught scamming a casino with Vinny, and after she is made to promise to stop causing trouble, the Dingles allow her to stay. Paul Ashdale (Reece Dinsdale) arrives in the village, and he reveals to Vinny that he is his biological father. Mandy explains to Vinny that he has a gambling addiction, and this led to him ruining their lives when Vinny was young. He promises that he has stopped gambling, but continues in secret.

== Reception ==
For her portrayal of Mandy, Riley won Most Popular Newcomer at the 2nd National Television Awards in 1996. At the 1997 Inside Soap Awards, Mandy won the Biggest Laugh in Soap accolade, while Riley was nominated for Best Actress. Riley was also longlisted for "Best Comic Performance" at the 2024 Inside Soap Awards.

In 1996, Sarah Hey of the Daily Mirror wrote: "She is a brazen man-eater who could polish off a bloke for breakfast and be ready for another by tea-time. You can rest assured that Emmerdale's Mandy Dingle – the bawdy brunette with the fuller figure and gravelly laugh – would be chasing an army of Valentines today." In 2020, Riley appeared on the Digital Spy Soap Scoop. When asked about the reaction to Mandy's infertility storyline, she stated that she was more than "inundated" with praise on social media. She noted that many of the comments were from people who had had hysterectomies, and they thanked both Riley and Emmerdale "for bringing it to the forefront". Viewers described her as a "powerhouse", and demanded that Riley be awarded for the scenes. Digital Spy's Amy West stated that the scenes were "certainly a tear-jerker moment".
