= Shirley Turner (disambiguation) =

Shirley Turner is an American Democratic Party politician.

Shirley Turner may also refer to:

- Shirley Jane Turner (1961–2003), killer of her child Zachary Turner
- Shirley Turner (Emmerdale), a character in the British soap opera Emmerdale
