= Malandra Burrows =

English actress and singer

- Born: Malandra Elizabeth Burrows; 4 November 1965 (age 61); Woolton, Liverpool, Lancashire, England
- Occupations: Actress; singer
- Years active: 1972–present
- Known for: Emmerdale

Appeared in the talent show New Faces in 1974 under the name Malandra Newman as a child singer making the final.

Malandra Elizabeth Burrows (née Newman; 4 November 1965) is an English actress and singer. She is best known for her long-running role as Kathy Glover in ITV soap opera Emmerdale (1985–2001, 2005).

== Early life ==
After deciding that she wanted to be a performer, Burrows joined the Everyman Youth Theatre in Liverpool, did classes at Liverpool Theatre School and also did productions with a local amateur dramatics company at St Peter's, in Woolton, whilst continuing to perform musically. After leaving school with eleven O-levels, she enrolled in a Liverpool drama school, where she remained for two years learning her future trade of acting – changing her surname to Burrows for registration with Equity, the British actors' union.

== Career ==
Even before leaving drama school, Burrows played several roles on television, appearing in The Practice and Fell Tiger, as well as taking two parts in the Channel 4 soap opera Brookside – firstly Lucy Collins' schoolfriend, Sue, and then Lisa Morrissey, the girlfriend of Pat Hancock.

=== Emmerdale ===
Three months after leaving drama school, she auditioned for the role of Kathy Bates in the popular ITV soap opera Emmerdale (then known as Emmerdale Farm) and got the part. The role has been her most prominent to date. She became one of the programme's longest-running characters, remaining in the show from 1985 to 2001 and returning briefly in 2005. Kathy is remembered for being one of the most-often married characters in the soap and had a reputation for having "the kiss of death" on her men. First husband Jackie Merrick accidentally shot himself in 1989; her second marriage to Chris Tate, who uses a wheelchair, ended in 1995 when he admitted to an affair; in 1996 Kathy’s third husband Dave Glover died saving a baby he thought to be his own from a house fire as he was about to elope with his mistress Kim Tate. Kathy was even dumped at the altar by her fiancé Biff in 1999.

During her 16-year stint, Kathy was kidnapped by a diamond-thieving lord, knocked down by a horse-stealing conman, targeted by a double wife murderer who tried to drive her over a cliff, trapped in the wreckage of a bus hit by a lorry, and imprisoned for protesting against the local haulage company. Reportedly one of the soap's highest-paid stars of the time on a reputed £80,000pa, she paid the price of celebrity when a fanatical patient escaped from custody threatening to kill her; she had police protection for two months. She was axed from the soap as part of ITV's revamp of the programme. Burrows returned for three episodes for Seth Armstrong's funeral in 2005. In 2009, Burrows was asked to return to Emmerdale for Jack Sugden's funeral episodes in February, but was unable due to working in pantomime during Christmas 2008 and January 2009, which prevented her from making a return.

=== Pop career ===
Burrows has had some success in the UK Singles Chart, reaching number 11 with the song "Just This Side of Love" in 1990. She released a self-penned single "Summernight Love" (1996) on AATW/DKAM Records (No. 185 UK). This resulted in a recording contract with Warner Bros., and two more singles ("Carnival in Heaven" and "Don't Leave Me") also hit the UK charts (albeit the lower reaches: No. 49 and No. 54, respectively).

=== Other work ===
Burrows played many parts in theatre including in 1989 she starred as Nancy in Oliver Twist at the Civic Theatre, Halifax. In 2002 Burrows was a contestant on Celebrity Weakest Link and in 2004 she took part in the ITV game show Simply the Best, where she represented Leeds in a head-to-head tournament with other British cities. She then spent a year presenting a show called Soap Addicts on satellite, and then a year in the stage comedy Just Desserts touring the United Kingdom.

In 2006 she appeared on Channel 5's The All Star Talent Show, coming fifth as a Fire Eater. She starred as the Fairy during Christmas 2007, in "Sleeping Beauty" at the Pavilion Theatre, Bournemouth.

Burrows entered late into the 2006 series of I'm a Celebrity... Get Me Out of Here! on day seven. She was found hanging from a tight rope and had to be rescued as part of the trial by Matt Willis and Lauren Booth. On her first night she had to sleep in a hammock, and fell out of it. She took part in several "Bushtrucker trials" most notably one dubbed "Skyscrape". Burrows and fellow contestant Myleene Klass were required to clamber onto a seesaw platform 200 ft above the jungle floor and take turns to collect corresponding flags hanging off the edges of the platform. Each pair of flags, collected in numerical order, equalled a much needed meal for camp. She was the sixth celebrity to be evicted in a head-to-head with Dean Gaffney.

In December 2023, Burrows appeared on The Big Soap Quiz, sparking rumours that she could quite possibly be returning to the dales where fans rushed to support her.

== Filmography ==
Year	Title	Role	Notes
1983	Brookside	Sue	Episode: "Campaign Plan"
1985	Brookside	Lisa Morrissey	2 episodes
1985–2001, 2005	Emmerdale	Kathy Glover	Regular role; 1,528 episodes
1998	Emmerdale: Revenge	Kathy Glover	Spin-off film
2002	Soap Addicts	Herself	Host
2002	The Weakest Link	Herself	Contestant; 1 episode
2004	Simply the Best	Herself	Contestant; 2 episodes
2006	I'm a Celebrity...Get Me Out of Here!	Herself	Contestant (series 6)
2022	Lorraine	Herself	1 episode
2023	The Big Soap Quiz	Herself	Episode 12; special guest

== Discography ==
=== Singles ===
- 1990 "Just This Side of Love" (YTV Records) (UK No. 11)
- 1996 "Summernight Love" (DKAM Records) (UK No. 185)
- 1997 "Carnival in Heaven" (Warner Bros) (UK No. 49)
- 1998 "Don't Leave Me" (Warner Bros) (UK No. 54)
- 2007 "Keep on keepin' on" (duet Marsh Newman) (Sanctuary) (Japan No. 18)
- 2022 "Beauty and the Beast" (Duet Marsh Newman) (Sanctuary) (Releasing August 2022)
