= Hillbilly Rock Hillbilly Roll =

1996 single by the Woolpackers

Single by the Woolpackers

from the album Emmer Dance
- B-side: "Line Dancing"
- Released: 4 November 1996
- Studio: Metropolis, Westside (London, England); Skratch (Surrey, England); The Enterprise (Los Angeles)
- Genre: Country
- Length: 2:36
- Label: RCA; BMG
- Songwriters: Edwin Michael Phillips; Robert Anthony Garner
- Producer: Nigel Wright

The Woolpackers singles chronology
"Hillbilly Rock Hillbilly Roll" (1996)	"Line Dance Party" (1997)

Music video
- "Hillbilly Rock Hillbilly Roll" on YouTube

"Hillbilly Rock Hillbilly Roll" is a song by English country rock trio the Woolpackers, written by Eddie Phillips and Bob Garner of the Creation and produced by Nigel Wright. The song was created on the ITV soap opera Emmerdale, where three of the show's actors—Steve Halliwell, Billy Hartman, and Alun Lewis—attempt to cash in on the line dancing trend that was prominent in the United Kingdom at the time by performing the song as their characters on the programme.

"Hillbilly Rock Hillbilly Roll" was released as a single in the UK on 4 November 1996 and reached number five on the UK Singles Chart, earning a gold sales certification in October 2022 for sales and streams of over 400,000 units in the UK alone. The track stayed in the UK top 20 for nine weeks and was the country's 41st-best-selling single of 1996.

== Track listings ==
UK CD and cassette single

1. "Hillbilly Rock Hillbilly Roll"
2. "Line Dancing"
3. "Hillbilly Rock Hillbilly Roll" (instrumental)

UK and Irish CD single (with poster)

1. "Hillbilly Rock Hillbilly Roll"
2. "Hillbilly Rock Hillbilly Roll" (Wand's Fully Dramatised club mix)
3. "Line Dancing"
4. "Hillbilly Rock Hillbilly Roll" (instrumental)

== Credits and personnel ==
Credits are lifted from the UK CD single liner notes.

Studios

- Recorded and mixed at Metropolis Studios, Westside Studios (London, England), Skratch Studios (Surrey, England), and The Enterprise (Los Angeles)

Personnel

- Edwin Michael Phillips – writing
- Robert Anthony Garner – writing
- Nigel Wright – production
- Robin Sellars – engineering
- Lee McCutcheon – programming

== Charts ==
=== Weekly charts ===
Chart (1996)	Peak position
Europe (Eurochart Hot 100)	17
Scotland Singles (OCC)	5
UK Singles (OCC)	5

=== Year-end charts ===
Chart (1996)	Position
UK Singles (OCC)	41

== Certifications ==
Region	Certification	Certified units/sales
United Kingdom (BPI)	Gold	400,000^{‡}
^{‡} Sales+streaming figures based on certification alone.
