= 2nd National Television Awards =

British awards ceremony in 1996

- Date: 9 October 1996
- Location: Royal Albert Hall, London
- Country: United Kingdom
- Presented by: Various
- Hosted by: Trevor McDonald
- Website: http://www.nationaltvawards.com/

Television/radio coverage
- Network: ITV

The 2nd National Television Awards ceremony was held at the Royal Albert Hall on 9 October 1996 and was hosted by Trevor McDonald.

== Awards ==
Category	Winner	Also nominated
Most Popular Actor	David Duchovny (The X-Files)	Robbie Coltrane (Cracker); Colin Firth (Pride and Prejudice); David Jason (A Touch of Frost); Ross Kemp (EastEnders)
Most Popular Actress	Dervla Kirwan (Ballykissangel)	Gillian Anderson (The X-Files); Jennifer Ehle (Pride and Prejudice); Sarah Lancashire (Coronation Street); Jacqueline Pirie (Emmerdale)
Most Popular Drama Series	The Bill (ITV)	Band of Gold (ITV); Heartbeat (ITV); London's Burning (ITV)
Most Popular Serial Drama	EastEnders (BBC1)	Brookside (Channel 4); Coronation Street (ITV); Emmerdale (ITV); Home and Away (ITV/Seven Network); Neighbours (BBC1/Network Ten)
Most Popular Talk Show	The Ricki Lake Show (Channel 4/Syndicated)	The Clive James Show (ITV); Des O'Connor Tonight (ITV); Esther (BBC2)
Most Popular Entertainment Programme	Stars in Their Eyes (ITV)	The Generation Game (BBC1); Noel's House Party (BBC1); 40 Years of ITV Laughter (ITV)
Most Popular Entertainment Presenter	Michael Barrymore	Noel Edmonds; Chris Evans; Lily Savage
Most Popular Factual Programme	Animal Hospital (BBC1)	
Most Popular Quiz Programme	They Think It's All Over (BBC1)	Take Your Pick (ITV) Big Break (BBC1) Family Fortunes (ITV)
Most Popular Comedy Programme	Men Behaving Badly (BBC1)	Father Ted; Keeping Up Appearances; Nelson's Column (BBC1)
Most Popular Comedy Performer	Martin Clunes	Rowan Atkinson; Dawn French; Nicholas Lyndhurst
Most Popular Newcomer	Lisa Riley (Emmerdale)	
Most Popular Children's Programme	Top of the Pops (BBC1)	
Most Popular News Presenter	Trevor McDonald	Michael Buerk; Martyn Lewis; John Suchet
Special Recognition Award	David Jason	
