= The Big Quiz (game show) =

- Presented by: Stephen Mulhern (2011–2023, 2025); Sally Lindsay (2024)
- Country of origin: United Kingdom
- Original language: English
- No. of episodes: 14

Production
- Production location: Dock10
- Production companies: ITV Studios Entertainment (2011–2020); Lifted Entertainment (2021–2025)

Original release
- Network: ITV
- Release: 16 December 2011 – 15 December 2025

The Big Quiz was a British entertainment quiz show that aired on ITV between 16 December 2011 and 15 December 2025, it was hosted by Stephen Mulhern and in 2024 by Sally Lindsay. It started as an annual quiz between soap operas Coronation Street and Emmerdale.

== Episodes ==
| Episode | Air date | Teams | Team 1 | Team 2 |
|---|---|---|---|---|
| 1 | 16 December 2011 | Coronation Street vs Emmerdale | Jennie McAlpine; Malcolm Hebden; Patti Clare; Jack P. Shepherd | Mark Charnock; Natalie Anderson; Danny Miller; Meg Johnson |
| 2 | 15 April 2012 | The Only Way Is Essex vs Benidorm | Joey Essex; Lauren Goodger; James Argent; Gemma Collins | Jake Canuso; Crissy Rock; Janine Duvitski; Shelley Longworth |
| 3 | 26 July 2012 | The Big Sports Quiz: Boys vs Girls | Paddy McGuinness; Joe Hart; Kriss Akabusi; Mark Foster | Charlotte Jackson; Amy Williams; Karen Pickering; Louise Hazel |
| 4 | 1 January 2016 | Coronation Street vs Emmerdale | Jack P. Shepherd; Brooke Vincent; Sue Cleaver; Michael Le Vell | Mark Charnock; Charlotte Bellamy; Liam Fox; Samantha Giles |
| 5 | 6 January 2017 | Coronation Street vs Emmerdale | Jack P. Shepherd; Catherine Tyldesley; Dolly-Rose Campbell; Daniel Brocklebank | Mark Charnock; Natalie J. Robb; Chris Bisson; Matthew Wolfenden |
| 6 | 5 January 2018 | Coronation Street vs Emmerdale | Jack P. Shepherd; Peter Gunn; Bhavna Limbachia; Julia Goulding | Mark Charnock; Michelle Hardwick; Amy Walsh; Dominic Brunt |
| 7 | 21 December 2018 | Coronation Street vs Emmerdale | Jack P. Shepherd; Sally Ann Matthews; Victoria Ekanoye; Jim Moir | Mark Charnock; Sandra Marvin; Tony Audenshaw; Crissy Rock |
| 8 | 19 December 2019 | Coronation Street vs Emmerdale | Jack P. Shepherd; Alan Halsall; Alexandra Mardell; Sue Nicholls | Mark Charnock; Lisa Riley; Isabel Hodgins; Nick Miles |
| 9 | 21 December 2020 | Coronation Street vs Emmerdale | Jack P. Shepherd; Simon Gregson; Sair Khan | Mark Charnock; Karen Blick; Jay Kontzle |
| 10 | 20 December 2021 | Coronation Street vs Emmerdale | Jack P. Shepherd; Tanisha Gorey; Jane Danson | Mark Charnock; Emile John; Sally Dexter |
| 11 | 9 December 2022 | Coronation Street vs Emmerdale | Jack P. Shepherd; Sally Dynevor; Ryan Russell | Mark Charnock; Nicola Wheeler; Jurrell Carter |
| 12 | 28 December 2023 | Coronation Street vs Emmerdale | Jack P. Shepherd; Tony Maudsley; Channique Sterling-Brown | Mark Charnock; Natalie Ann Jamieson; Kevin Mathurin |
| 13 | 23 December 2024 | Coronation Street vs Emmerdale | Jack P. Shepherd; Samia Longchambon; Vinta Morgan | Mark Charnock; Rebecca Sarker; Beth Cordingly |
| 14 | 15 December 2025 | Coronation Street vs Emmerdale | Jack P. Shepherd; Sam Aston; Georgia Taylor; Jodie Prenger | Mark Charnock; Lucy Pargeter; Shebz Miah; Bradley Riches |
