= Victoria Finney =

British actress

Victoria Finney is a British actress on stage, screen and radio. On TV, she is best known as Louise Richards in Families from 1990 to 1993. Finney has also performed in the TV series The Grand, Children's Ward, The Bill and Holby City. On stage, she has appeared in Shakespeare and in contemporary plays, to critical acclaim: "outstanding .... her performance ... steals the show"; "excellent performance with [her] exhibition of strong and dignified womanhood"; "Finney ... plays Kath with quiet assurance and wit". She is married to theatre producer Julian Crouch.

== Selected stage performances ==
Year	Title	Role	Theatre
1993	And All Because the Lady Loves ...	Kath	The Cockpit
1996	Wild Honey	Grekova	Stephen Joseph Theatre, Scarborough
1996	Dealing With Clair	Clair	Scarborough in the Round
1997	A Midsummer Night’s Dream	Helena	English Shakespeare Company touring production
1998 – 1999	The House of Bernarda Alba	Amelia	Theatre Royal, Bath
2000	The Winter's Tale	Hermione/Mopsa	Southwark Playhouse, London
2018	Sound House	Daphne Oram	Flea Theater
