= Emmerdale plane crash =

Storyline in Emmerdale

- Emmerdale episode
- Episode no.: Episode 1829
- Directed by: Ken Horn
- Written by: Andy Lynch
- Original air date: 30 December 1993
- Running time: 30 minutes (including adverts)

Episode chronology
← Previous "Episode 1828a"	Next → "Episode 1830"

The Emmerdale plane crash, also known as the Beckindale air disaster, was a storyline for the British soap opera Emmerdale, broadcast on ITV. The episode aired on 30 December 1993, and gave Emmerdale its highest-ever viewing figures of 18 million.

== Background ==
Emmerdale Farm was originally devised as similar in concept to the long-running BBC Radio 4 soap The Archers, focusing on the farm life of the Sugden family. Originally a low-profile, rural drama broadcast in the daytime, efforts were made by Yorkshire Television to transform the show into a more dramatised serial along the lines of the ITV network's main soap Coronation Street, beginning in 1989 when the show's focus moved to the nearby village of Beckindale and "Farm" was dropped from the title accordingly. Phil Redmond, creator of Channel 4 soap Brookside, was brought in to develop ideas and advise on storylines.

The plane crash was the culmination of these efforts and the end of the show's transformation from a minor daytime rural drama into one of the biggest soaps in the UK, on an equal footing with the likes of the BBC's EastEnders and the aforementioned Coronation Street.

== Synopsis ==
Beckindale is partly demolished, and four regular characters are killed, when a Niklovic 745X wide-body airliner travelling to Canada from Eastern Europe suffers a catastrophic failure at altitude and burning debris crashes into the village and surrounding countryside. The four victims of the plane crash are Mark Hughes (who had been in the show since 1988), Elizabeth Pollard (who had joined in 1990), Archie Brooks (who joined in 1983) and Leonard Kempinski (who had joined only the previous year). Five other villagers, who were not characters in the serial, were also killed, as well as all 138 passengers and crew of the airliner. The total death toll was 147.

== Plot ==
=== Prelude ===
The plane crash was the culmination of several storylines that had been running throughout the soap during the latter part of 1993. Earlier in the year, Annie Sugden had married Leonard Kempinski and was planning to emigrate with her new husband to Spain. Mark Hughes (Annie's step-grandson) was due to take them, but had borrowed a vacuum cleaner from neighbour Lynn Whiteley. Joe demanded that Mark return it himself and that he would take his mother and new stepfather to the airport instead.

Eric Pollard's marriage with new wife Elizabeth had been falling apart during the previous few months as she discovered that he was responsible for a series of cheque frauds and theft of antiques while attempting to frame her son Michael. Despite reporting her suspicions to the police, Eric had managed to dissuade them that he was responsible and that she was suffering from the menopause; however, Elizabeth remained determined to expose her husband, regardless of the consequences to him or her.

Kathy Tate was also in a failing marriage, growing increasingly distanced from husband Chris as he sought to expand his business empire. During 1993, she had fallen in love with American wine merchant Josh Lewis and was planning to leave Chris on the night of the plane crash, preparing a letter for him explaining what she had done.

Frank Tate had divorced his wife Kim earlier in the year following her affair with rival Neil Kincaid, enabling her to set up her own stables with her settlement. During the latter stages of 1993, Kim and Frank had started to partly reconcile and hinted at re-establishing their relationship. Frank went to give a present to Kim on the night of the plane crash, but was nearly put off by seeing the Windsor family in the distance who were visiting the stables to look at Kim's horses.

Alan Turner had arranged a fundraising night at the Woolpack pub in order to help raise money for Seth Armstrong's prostate complaint. Alan kicked out Seth when he discovered he had been duping rival pub the Malt Shovel into doing exactly the same thing. Lynn Whiteley, who was attending the event, began winding up former boyfriend Archie Brooks by insinuating he was in a same-sex relationship with his best friend Nick Bates, resulting in both men leaving the pub.

The village itself was partially isolated at the time the plane crash occurred, as the main bridge into it was temporarily out of action owing to repairs being completed by the local water company.

=== Events ===
The first scene of the plane crash was when Frank Tate was looking at Kim's stables when suddenly a ball of fire hits the structure. Nick Bates and Archie Brooks were walking home when they were blinded by some fluid, and Archie was engulfed in flames. His body was never found. Nick recovered his eyesight and later suffered a breakdown when he discovered what had transpired. The rumbling of the crashing plane debris was heard by the villagers who were in the Woolpack at the time, while the power cut out and all the windows shattered. Joe Sugden crashes his Rover Montego when a part of the plane collides with the car; Annie and Leonard Kempinski were also in the car. Joe suffered a broken leg and Annie remained in a coma for several months. However, Leonard died. He and Annie were married for only two months.

At the stables, Kim had to be restrained by Frank from trying to retrieve her horses and could only listen helplessly as her horses screamed for help. Frank left the stables to drive into the village to find out what had happened. Kim began to remove her belongings from the caravan while the Windsors continued to try to contain the fire. Barely managing to escape with their lives, Kim and the Windsor family quickly evacuated the stables as Kim's caravan exploded after a gas cylinder falls into the fire next to it.

People in the Woolpack started to regain consciousness; Frank arrived and began to organise searches for other people nearby. Eric Pollard started wandering around looking for his wife, Elizabeth. As the hours passed, he started to draw attention as many people became suspicious of his behaviour. Elizabeth is eventually found dead and is declared a victim of the plane crash. However, many people, on- and off-screen, believe that Eric killed his wife as she was on her way to the police to report him for forging cheques. Viewers did not learn the truth until some seventeen years later, when Eric confessed to his then wife Valerie that he had intended to kill Elizabeth, but she ran away from him and was struck by debris from the plane. He discovered her lifeless body but did not report it, concealing the fact that he had angrily followed her out into the night.

Outside, Alan Turner picks up a plane ticket with the name "Kurshkov" on it; he notices more wreckage in the field together with Angharad and Bernard McAllister and it becomes clearer what has happened. The local school is used as a base and a mortuary. Mark Hughes's arm can be seen sticking out of some rubble. At the school, Jack Sugden notices Mark's watch among the personal belongings that have been found; it is the one that Annie gave him at Christmas. Jack has the unfortunate task of identifying his body. Chris Tate is discovered in the wine bar but his legs are trapped under heavy rubble. When he is retrieved, he is airlifted to hospital. Chris would learn that he has lost the use of his legs for the rest of his life.

Seth Armstrong, who was initially feared killed, was devastated to learn that his pet dog Smokey had died. While mourning Smokey, he heard the cries of Nick Bates's baby daughter Alice who had been left home alone when Eric had attempted to stop Elizabeth from reporting him to the police. Alice was later rescued by the emergency services.

Many buildings in the village were left in ruin as a result of the crash, and the surrounding farmland was rendered toxic by the plane's fuel. As well as the nine villagers who perished, many other bodies were found all over the village and countryside. The destruction of the village later resulted in it being renamed Emmerdale after the Sugdens' farm, an announcement that took place a few months later at the wedding of Jack Sugden to Sarah Connolly.

== Aftermath ==
Kim's stables were completely destroyed; she moved back into Home Farm and rekindled her relationship with Frank, eventually resulting in their getting remarried later in the year (although they would separate for good 18 months later). Josh Lewis, recognising that Kathy would not leave Chris as he was injured, left Beckindale for good. Chris and Kathy moved into a specially modified bungalow that Frank had purchased but their relationship eventually fell apart and they divorced the following year.

Rachel Hughes and Michael Feldmann returned to the village to discover the deaths of Mark and Elizabeth; Rachel blamed Joe for Mark's death and their relationship remained strained until Amos returned for their funerals and convinced them to make up. Michael never stopped blaming Eric for his mother's death and they eventually came to blows before Michael left the village. Upon hearing of the crash, Elsa returned to the village and challenged Nick for custody of Alice; she eventually conceded. Nick had a breakdown upon learning of Archie's death but eventually recovered with the support of his family and friends.

Annie remained in a coma for some months; she woke up upon hearing the voice of newlyborn granddaughter Victoria but was initially unable to remember the crash or her deceased husband Leonard. Both Annie and Joe would eventually leave the village and relocate to Spain with Amos.

Having lost her home in the crash, Lynn Whiteley attempted to make as much money as possible from journalists, much to the ire of the rest of the village who eventually resented her actions and she left the village in mid-1994.

=== Legacy ===
After the dust settled, the plane crash has been mentioned in the years since. In 2003, the villagers protested against a group of journalists wanting to film a 10th anniversary documentary after they descended on the village. In late 2010, Michael Feldmann returned after 16 years away and accused Eric Pollard of murdering Elizabeth. Eric had a motive, as Elizabeth was on to him about cheque fraud and trying to blame Michael for it. Eric later admits to Val that he would have killed her but flames and debris from the burning airliner beat him to it on that dark December night. The plane crash was mentioned by Lawrence White in October 2015, and most recently in January 2026.

== Reception ==
Previously seen as "quaint and slow" compared with other British soap operas, the plane crash was a turning point for Emmerdale and marked its "graduation" into a major prime time soap opera. The episode gave Emmerdale its highest-ever audience of 18 million. According to The Independent, the episode proved to be "brilliant television", as it "allowed the writers to get rid of much dead wood, and reinvent the soap virtually from scratch".

The timing of the storyline was not without controversy, as it aired close to the fifth anniversary of the Lockerbie disaster, and ITV received many complaints as a result. Shortly after the initial episodes of the plane crash storyline aired, cast members Clive Hornby (who played Jack Sugden) and Madeline Howard (who played Sarah Connolly) appeared on GMTV to discuss the episodes with presenter Eamonn Holmes. It is widely believed that the storyline, which had been a source of division between the show's producers and cast-crew, was what precipitated Madeline Howard's departure from the show a few months afterwards, resulting in the recasting of her character with Alyson Spiro.

== Home media ==
Episodes of the Plane Crash storyline have been released twice on home media. The first was an omnibus compilation of four episodes called "The Rescue". Book-ended by an introduction and conclusion from actor Norman Bowler (Frank Tate), it included episodes 1829–1832, which centred on the crash and subsequent rescue of the villagers. In 2007, to celebrate the show's 35th anniversary, episodes 1829 and 1830 were released on a DVD set alongside several other episodes from Emmerdale's history, titled simply The Best of Emmerdale.

== In popular culture ==
In the 5 January 1994 episode of Channel 4 soap Brookside, character Mick Johnson (Louis Emerick) is seen reading a newspaper with the front page headline "Air Crash Latest – Village Mourns As Many Die", reflecting the events in Emmerdale.

The plane crash was also mentioned in the Emmerdale–Coronation Street crossover episode Corriedale on 5 January 2026. Taxi driver Tim Metcalfe, upon hearing that his passenger Chas Dingle is from Emmerdale, asks "Isn't that where the plane crashed?"
