= Steve Halliwell =

English actor (1946–2023)

- Halliwell as Zak Dingle in Emmerdale
- Born: Stephen Harold Halliwell; 19 March 1946; Bury, Lancashire, England
- Died: 15 December 2023 (aged 77); Leeds, West Yorkshire, England
- Occupation: Actor
- Years active: 1976–2023
- Television: Emmerdale (1994–2023)
- Spouses: Susan Woods (m. 1972, divorced); Valerie Kirkby (m. 1984)
- Children: 3

Stephen Harold Halliwell (19 March 1946 – 15 December 2023) was an English actor, best known for playing Zak Dingle in the ITV soap opera Emmerdale from 1994 until his death in 2023.

== Early life ==
Stephen Harold Halliwell was born on 19 March 1946 in Stockport, Cheshire, to parents Fred and Jenny Halliwell. He had a brother, Clive, who was two years older. Halliwell was an apprentice engineer and worked mainly in cotton and paper mills before drama training at the Mountview Theatre School. He was a founding member of the Interchange Theatre in Bury. Halliwell was once arrested for sleeping rough in an empty government building in London. He was sent to a prison in Ashford for two weeks and was later released on probation. He also spoke openly about his experiences with depression throughout this period of his life.

== Career ==
During the first two decades of his career, Halliwell featured in a number of British television series, including Here I Stand, Threads, Cracker, Crown Court, G.B.H., Heartbeat and Coronation Street. In 1994, he joined the cast of the ITV soap opera Emmerdale as Zak Dingle. Together with Emmerdale co-stars Billy Hartman and Alun Lewis, he was a member of UK 1990s country rock trio the Woolpackers who released the single "Hillbilly Rock Hillbilly Roll" in November 1996. In 2014, Halliwell released his autobiography titled If The Cap Fits: My Rocky Road to Emmerdale. Halliwell remained in Emmerdale for 29 years, with his final scenes airing in June 2023.

== Personal life ==
Halliwell had a child with his then-partner whilst he was a student; the child, a daughter, was given up for adoption. In 1997 it was reported that Halliwell was searching for her. Halliwell's first marriage to his childhood sweetheart Susan Woods in 1972 later ended in divorce. He married Valerie Kirkby in 1984, and their daughter Charlotte was born the same year. In 2003, Halliwell took a short break from Emmerdale for personal reasons. He later said that the break was due to staying at a rehabilitation centre for alcoholism. In September 2018, Halliwell had to take five months off from Emmerdale for health reasons, which he later revealed was due to having a heart surgery and a pacemaker fitted.

== Death ==
Halliwell died on 15 December 2023, at age 77 after a period of ill health. A statement from his family confirmed that he had "[died] peacefully with his loved ones around him". Several of his Emmerdale co-stars paid tribute to him, including his character's on-screen niece Lisa Riley, who thanked him for "years of laughter" and noted that he was "adored, loved and respected by [the cast]".

== Filmography ==
Year	Title	Role	Notes
1977	Second City Firsts	Stan	Episode: "Daft Mam Blues"
1977	Here I Stand	Ionian	Episode: "The Gadfly"
1977	Crown Court	P.C. Mack	Episode: "Down Will Come Baby: Part 1"
1978	Pickersgill People	PC Donovan Dugdale	Episode: "Under the Moon of Love"
1983, 1989–1990	All Creatures Great and Small	PC Goole	3 episodes
1984	Coronation Street	Mr. Toft	Episode: #1.2382
1984	Crown Court	Mr. Hedley	Episode: "Burnt Futures: Part 1"
1984	Threads	Information officer	Television film
1985–1986	The Practice	Peter Bishop	Regular role; 44 episodes
1987	The Fourth Protocol	Plastercast Courier	Film
1988	Coronation Street	Paul Hindley	2 episodes
1988	Wipe Out	CPO Ringer	Series 1: Episode 1
1989	First and Last	Shop Assistant	Television film
1990	Children's Ward	Mr. Jenks	2 episodes
1990	Shoot to Kill	Sergeant Quinn	Television film
1990	Stay Lucky	Police Inspector	Episode: "The Devil Wept in Leeds"
1991	Coronation Street	Returning officer	Episode: #1.3221
1991	G.B.H.	Bubbles' friend	Episode: "It Couldn't Happen Here"
1993	Three Seven Eleven	Architect	2 episodes
1993	Heartbeat	Newsagent	Episode: "Manhunt"
1993–1994	Coronation Street	Bob Cairns	Recurring role; 8 episodes
1993	ScreenPlay	Brain Flannery	Episode: "The Merrihill Millionaires"
1993	Cracker	Fire Officer	Episode: "To Say I Love You: Part 3"
1993	Comic Timing	Sgt. Halliwell	Episode: "That Nice Mrs. Merton"
1994	Fair Game	YHA Warden	Television film
1994–2023	Emmerdale	Zak Dingle	Regular role; 2,795 episodes
1995	Elidor	Mr. Brodie	Series 1: Episode 5
1996	The Woolpackers: Emmerdance	Zak Dingle	Video release
1997	Emmerdale: The Dingles Down Under	Zak Dingle	Video release
1999	Emmerdale: Don't Look Now! – The Dingles in Venice	Zak Dingle	Video release
2010	Emmerdale: The Dingles – For Richer or Poorer	Zak Dingle	Video release
2014	Ant & Dec's Saturday Night Takeaway	Zak Dingle	Series 11: Episode 6

== Sources ==
- Anthony Hayward (1994). Who's Who on Television. Boxtree Limited. ISBN 1-85283-936-8.
