= Karen Blick =

English actress (born 1974)

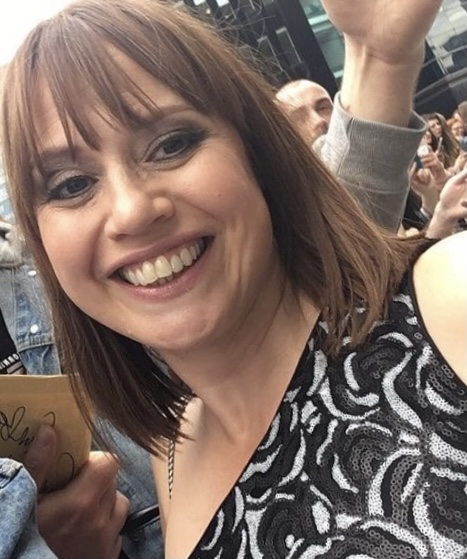
- Blick in 2019
- Born: Karen Louise Blick; 25 October 1974 (age 52); Leeds, West Yorkshire, England
- Occupation: Actress
- Years active: 2006–present
- Television: Emmerdale
- Spouse: Simon (m. 2011)
- Children: 2

Karen Louise Blick (born 25 October 1974) is an English actress, known for portraying the role of Lydia Hart in the ITV soap opera Emmerdale since 2016 "Before joining the regular cast of Emmerdale, Blick worked extensively in community education and local broadcasting, including a period presenting and volunteering for the Halifax-based community station Phoenix Radio 96.7FM

== Life and career ==
Karen Louise Blick was born on 25 October 1974 in Leeds, West Yorkshire. She began her acting career in 2006, portraying a teacher in the Channel 4 comedy series No Angels and appeared in the ITV soap opera Emmerdale as a nurse at an abortion clinic attended by Viv Hope (Deena Payne). The following year, after struggling find acting work in what Blick described as a "precarious business", she trained as a teacher and began teaching drama at secondary schools, before working at her old sixth form college in Halifax. Blick said she did not initially disclose her career as an actress, not wanting to be seen as "deluded". In 2011, Blick married her husband Simon, having been together 15 years. They have a son and a daughter.

In 2015, she appeared as Sandra in the comedy series Nomads. In 2016, Blick joined the cast of Emmerdale as Lydia Hart, who first appeared as the leader of a bereavement support group that Jimmy King (Nick Miles) attends by mistake. Her character's storylines on the show have since included the discovery of her past as someone who gave birth to a stillborn baby that she buried, her marriage to Sam Dingle (James Hooton), being diagnosed with Huntington's disease and being the victim of rape by Craig Reed (Ben Addis). Blick has made appearances on Big Star's Little Star alongside her daughter Ruby, Good Evening Britain, Lorraine, Loose Women and The Big Quiz. She also appeared in the short film Treasure in 2022.

== Filmography ==
| Year | Title | Role | Notes | Ref. |
|---|---|---|---|---|
| 2006 | No Angels | Teacher | Guest role | |
| 2006 | Emmerdale | Nurse | Guest role | |
| 2015 | Nomads | Sandra | Guest role | |
| 2016–present | Emmerdale | Lydia Hart | Regular role | |
| 2018 | Good Evening Britain | Herself | Guest; 1 episode | |
| 2018 | Big Star's Little Star | Herself | Guest; 1 episode | |
| 2019 | Lorraine | Herself | Guest; 1 episode | |
| 2019 | Loose Women | Herself | Guest; 1 episode | |
| 2020 | The Big Quiz | Herself | Guest; 1 episode | |
| 2022 | Jeremy Vine | Herself | Guest; 1 episode | |
| 2022 | Treasure | Alice's Mum | Short film | |
