= The Woolpackers =

English country rock trio

- Origin: Yorkshire, England
- Genres: Country rock
- Years active: 1996–97
- Labels: RCA; BMG
- Past members: Steve Halliwell (Zak Dingle); Billy Hartman (Terry Woods); Alun Lewis (Vic Windsor)

The Woolpackers were an English country rock trio of the 1990s, consisting of Steve Halliwell, Billy Hartman and Alun Lewis, all three of whom were stars of the ITV-produced soap opera Emmerdale, in an attempt to cash in on the popularity of line dancing at the time.

Despite numerous criticisms of their style, the group achieved a hit single with "Hillbilly Rock Hillbilly Roll" in November 1996, reaching number 5 on the UK Singles Chart. The parent album Emmer Dance reached number 26 on the UK Albums Chart a few weeks later. A year later, the single "Line Dance Party" hit number 25, and their second album, The Greatest Line Dancing Party, reached number 48 in the UK.

== Discography ==
=== Albums ===
Year	Title	Charts	Certifications
Year	Title	UK	Certifications
1996	Emmer Dance	26	BPI: Gold
1997	The Greatest Line Dancing Party Album	48	

=== Singles ===
Year	Title Parent album	Charts	Certifications	Album
Year	Title Parent album	UK	Certifications	Album
1996	"Hillbilly Rock Hillbilly Roll"	5	BPI: Gold	Emmer Dance
1997	"Line Dance Party"	25		The Greatest Line Dancing Party Album

=== Videography ===
- 1996: Emmer Dance, BPI: 2× Platinum
