= List of Emmerdale spin-offs and merchandise =

Various types of spin-offs and merchandise of the ITV soap opera Emmerdale have been released throughout the show's history, including films, books and documentaries.

== Films ==
This is the list of the direct-to-home-media Emmerdale films that have been released. The character of Marlon Dingle (played by Mark Charnock) is the only one to have appeared in them all.

- 1997: The Dingles Down Under
- 1998: Revenge
- 1999: The Dingles in Venice
- 2010: The Dingles: For Richer, For Poorer
- 2011: Paddy and Marlon's Big Night In

== Television ==
=== Soapstars ===
An ITV talent show, Soapstars, was broadcast in 2001 to cast a new five-member family on Emmerdale. The judging panel consisted of drama producer Yvon Grace, casting director Paul de Freitas, and Emmerdale scriptwriter Bill Lyons. The five winners made their debut on the show in November that year, and all had left by August 2002.

=== Documentaries ===
Emmerdale Family Album was a series of documentary episodes looking at the histories of three Emmerdale families: the Dingles, the Sugdens and the Tates. The episodes aired on ITV in 2005.

== Books ==
Several Emmerdale books, fiction and non-fiction, have been produced, a number written by Lee Mackenzie, the pen name of author Jean Bowden who also wrote as Tessa Barclay, Barbara Annandale and others; and James Ferguson (a pen name of author Peter Walker who (as Nicholas Rhea) also wrote the original novels the TV show Heartbeat is based on. Lance Parkin (who had been a storyliner on the TV show) also wrote a novel in the early 2000s. At least one of these was also translated into Finnish. The book titles for the original, popular series of novelisations, are:

- The Legacy (1) by Lee Mackenzie – stories from the original 1972 episodes
- Prodigal's Progress (2) by Lee Mackenzie – stories from 1973
- All That A Man Has... (3) by Lee Mackenzie – stories from 1973
- Lovers' Meeting (4) by Lee Mackenzie – stories from 1974
- A Sad And Happy Summer (5) by Lee Mackenzie – stories from 1973/1974
- A Sense Of Responsibility (6) by Lee Mackenzie – stories from 1975/1976
- Nothing Stays The Same (7) by Lee Mackenzie – stories from 1976
- The Couple At Demdyke Row (8) by Lee Mackenzie – stories from 1976/1977
- Whispers Of Scandal (9) by Lee Mackenzie – stories from 1977
- Shadows From The Past (10) by Lee Mackenzie – stories from 1977
- Lucky For Some (11) by Lee Mackenzie – stories from 1978
- Face Value (12) by Lee Mackenzie – stories from 1978
- Good Neighbours (13) by Lee Mackenzie – stories from 1978
- Innocent Victim (14) by Lee Mackenzie – stories from 1979
- False Witness (15) by Lee Mackenzie – stories from 1979
- The Homecoming (16) by Lee Mackenzie – stories from 1980
- Old Flames (17) by Lee Mackenzie – stories from 1980/1981
- Wedding Bells (18) by Lee Mackenzie – stories from 1981/1982
- Family Feuds (19) by Lee Mackenzie – stories from 1982
- Young Passions (20) by Lee Mackenzie – stories from 1983
- Another Door Opens (21) by Lee Mackenzie – stories from 1983
- A Friend In Need (22) by James Ferguson – stories from 1983/1984
- Divided Loyalties (23) by James Ferguson – stories from 1984
- Wives And Lovers (24) by James Ferguson – final novel of original series, stories from 1985

There was also

- Annie Sugden's County Diary by Lee Mackenzie – Annie's life in the 1920s until 1945
- Early Days at Emmerdale Farm by Lee Mackenzie – Annie's life from 1945 until the mid-1950s
- Emmerdale: Their Finest Hour by Lance Parkin – Life in Beckindale in 1941

A new series is currently being published

- Christmas at Emmerdale (1) by Pamela Bell – Life in Beckindale in 1914
- Spring Comes To Emmerdale (2) by Pamela Bell – Life in Beckindale through 1918 and beyond
- Emmerdale At War (3) by Pamela Bell – Life in Beckindale in 1940
- Hope Comes To Emmerdale (4) by Kerry Bell – Life in Beckindale during the Second World War
- The Emmerdale Girls (5) by Kerry Bell - Life in Beckindale as 1944 draws to a close

== Episode DVDs ==
DVD title	Number of episodes	Years of series	Release date	Notes
Emmerdale Farm: 35th Anniversary Edition	38	1972–1973 & 1993–2006	15 October 2007	Includes the first 26 episodes of Emmerdale Farm, and 12 of the most popular episodes of Emmerdale. This DVD set contains 6 discs.
Emmerdale Farm: Volume One	26	1972–1973	15 October 2007	Includes episodes 1-26. This DVD set contains 4 discs.
Emmerdale Farm: Volume Two	26	1973	14 September 2009	Includes episodes 27-52. This DVD set contains 4 discs.
Emmerdale Farm: Volume Three	32	1973	30 May 2011	Includes episodes 53-84. This DVD set contains 4 discs.
Soap Box: Volume 1	2	1976 & 2006	31 October 2011	Included as part of the Soap Box compilation, featuring episodes of various British soaps and TV dramas. Includes Episode #288 and Episode #4410, featuring the Kings River Explosion.
Emmerdale Farm: Volume Four	32	1973	6 August 2012	Includes episodes 85-116. This DVD set contains 4 discs.
Emmerdale Farm: Volume Five	32	1973–1974	31 August 2015	Includes episodes 117-148. This DVD set contains 4 discs.

== Other ==
As well as the films, books and episode DVDs there have been other videos and DVDs and memorabilia (often signed by cast members) released, including merchandise relating to The Woolpackers, the Emmerdale band that existed in the 1990s.
