= Alun Lewis (actor) =

British actor (born 1949)

- Born: Alun Lewis Bennett; 1949 (age 76–77); Wandsworth, London, England
- Education: Royal Academy of Dramatic Art
- Occupations: Actor, musician
- Years active: 1968–2017
- Spouse: Annette Ekblom (divorced)
- Children: Amelia Warner

Alun Lewis Bennett (born 1949) is a British retired actor, with roles in drama and comedy and musician.

== Early life ==
Lewis was born in London, England, the son of Welsh parents Sarah Gwen (née Lewis) and Gorden Bennett. He is the younger brother of actor Hywel Bennett, who played many roles in British film and television.

== Career ==
He appeared with the National Youth Theatre in Zigger Zagger at the Strand Theatre in the West End in March 1968 before training as an actor at RADA.

In 1979, Lewis appeared in the humorous film Le Pétomane. He is best known for his roles in ITV's Emmerdale as postmaster Vic Windsor, and Darryl Stubbs in BBC1 sitcom Birds of a Feather from 1989 to 1994.

Alongside Emmerdale co-stars Steve Halliwell and Billy Hartman, he was a member of UK 1990s country rock trio The Woolpackers who had a UK hit single "Hillbilly Rock Hillbilly Roll" in November 1996.

== Personal life ==
His daughter, by his former wife Annette Ekblom, is composer Amelia Warner.

== Television ==
- Beryl's Lot (1977)
- Rising Damp – Robin (1978) in S4, Episode 1 "Hello, Young Lovers"
- Noah's Castle (1979)
- The Professionals – CI5 agent McCabe in episode The Acorn Syndrome (1979)
- Minder – Jim in episode "Whose Wife is it Anyway?" (1980)
- Ennal's Point (1982)
- Boon (1987)
- The Wind in the Willows – Thomas (voice) in the episode "Happy New Year" (1988)
- The Bill (1989)
- Birds of a Feather – Darryl Stubbs (1989–1994)
- Rumpole of the Bailey (1991)
- Emmerdale – Vic Windsor (1993–1998)
- Lexx (2001)
- The Watcher in the Woods (2017)
