= Families (TV series) =

British soap opera

- Genre: Soap opera
- Created by: Kay Mellor
- Starring: Malcolm Stoddard; Morag Hood; See 'Main cast' section for longer list
- Country of origin: United Kingdom
- Original language: English
- No. of episodes: 323 (Note: There were actually 324 episodes, with episodes 323 and 324 making up the final episode, subsequent repeats on Granada Plus and Sky Soap showed these as separate episodes)

Production
- Running time: 30 mins
- Production company: Granada Television

Original release
- Network: ITV
- Release: 23 April 1990 – 24 August 1993

Families is a daytime soap opera, broadcast on the ITV network from 1990 to 1993. Created by writer Kay Mellor, it followed two families; the Thompsons, based in Cheshire, England in the fictional market town of Westbury, and the Stevens, living in Sydney, Australia. It was produced and recorded at Studio 6 at Granada Studios in Manchester.

== History ==
Debuting on 23 April 1990, the series aired twice per week on Mondays and Tuesdays. Both episodes were also repeated on Thursdays at 10.40pm in the Granada TV region as part of their late night strand. The show was unusual for a daytime soap, regularly tackling subjects that at the time would have been deemed controversial for a prime time soap. These included murder, suicide, incest, drugs, adultery, prostitution, mental health problems and homosexuality. It also contained some strong language and scenes of a sexual nature, all of which were screened, in most ITV regions, mid-afternoon immediately prior to children's programming. The theme music was composed by Matthew Scott.

In July 1993, after 324 episodes, the series ceased production, to be succeeded by daytime repeats of Coronation Street and Emmerdale. The final episode, aired in August 1993, was a dramatic feature length finale involving a birth, a possible suicide and a large and unexpected inheritance.

== Storylines ==
The link in the storyline was businessman Mike Thompson (Malcolm Stoddard), who walked out on his family on his birthday and flew to Australia to be with his true love Diana Stevens (Briony Behets), whom he had left years earlier. Unbeknownst to Mike, Diana had given birth to his son Andrew (Tayler Kane) and as complications ensued over the abrupt life changes for both families, Andrew travelled to England, where he met Mike's daughter, Amanda (Laura Girling), by his English wife Sue (Morag Hood), and they fell in love, unaware that they were half-brother and sister. This plot line was somewhat similar to the opening storyline of the popular Australian soap opera Sons and Daughters which had successfully aired on ITV daytime since 1983.

After two years, stories involving the Thompson and Stevens families—and the UK-Australian crossover angle—had run their course, with several characters either dead or left for pastures new (typically Brighton or Canberra). In their place came the wealthy Bannerman family, who were introduced during the summer of 1992, as they moved into the Thompsons' Cheshire mansion from a suburb of Manchester. In addition, some of the remaining Australian-based characters (including Diana Stevens and her husband Anton Vaughan) were re-located to England.

The series subsequently followed the intrigues involving the new family. Head of the Bannerman household was successful barrister Charles (Terence Harvey). The rest of the family comprised Charles' decorative wife Isabelle (Helen Bourne) and their four children—upstanding heir to the family law firm Simon (Thomas Russell), irresponsible teenager Matthew (Oliver Milburn), angelic countrywoman Rebecca (Karen Westwood) and beautiful go-getting vamp Juliette (Emma Davies). Juliette's best friend and Simon's fiancée Fiona Lewis (Claire Marchionne) also appeared, and turned out to be Charles' mistress.

To add balance to the series, the Richards family, who ran the local pub (The Railway), were also prominently featured, having been introduced during the latter Thompson family era in April 1991. They comprised: Larry (John Bowe), Jane (Margot Leicester) and daughters Chelsea (Tara Moran) and Louise (Victoria Finney). A son David was mentioned but never seen on-screen, as he lived in the US. Also present was Jane's sister Jackie Williams (Amanda Wenban) who had emigrated to Australia years earlier but was visiting Jane when the Richards family was first introduced. On her return to her own family in Sydney, she helped continue the UK-Australian crossover angle for a further year.

== Main cast ==
- Mike Thompson – Malcolm Stoddard
- Sue Thompson – Morag Hood
- Mark Thompson – Martin Glyn Murray
- Nathan Thompson – Jude Law
- John Thompson – Tim Woodward
- Amanda Thompson – Laura Girling
- Diana Stevens – Briony Behets
- Christian Stevens – Simon Edward Stokes
- Andrew Stevens – Tayler Kane
- Justine Stevens – Imogen Annesley
- George Davidson – Harry Littlewood
- Ruby Davidson – Madge Ryan
- Rachel Grandby – Anna Welsh
- Corinne Todd – Tessa Humphries
- Barbara Todd – Lyn Ashley
- Lisa Shepherd – Jane Hazlegrove
- Jackie Williams – Amanda Wenban
- Brian Williams – Kim Knuckey
- Paul Williams – Craig Black
- Jade Williams – Sascha Huckstepp
- Don McLeod – Bruce Hughes
- Anton Vaughan – Rhett Walton
- Larry Richards – John Bowe
- Jane Richards – Margot Leicester
- Chelsea Richards – Tara Moran
- Louise Richards Victoria Finney
- Neil Brooks – Patrick Cremin
- Charles Bannerman – Terence Harvey
- Isabelle Bannerman – Helen Bourne
- Rebecca Bannerman – Karen Westwood
- Simon Bannerman – Thomas Russell
- Juliette Bannerman – Emma Davies
- Matthew Bannerman – Oliver Milburn
- Fiona Lewis – Claire Marchionne
- Steve Harvey – Terence Hillyer
- Linda Harvey – Louise Plowright
- Gary Harvey – Jim Shepley
- Daniel Fielding – Gary Turner
- Dot Downing – Joan Campion
- James Proctor – Harry Shearer
- Dex – Harry Van Gorkum
- Chris Harrison – Richard Standing

== Filming ==
The show was filmed in north east Cheshire and Altrincham. Much of the UK/Australia plot was directed by Nicholas Ferguson, with all of the interior scenes shot in the Granada studio in Manchester. Cicely Mill in the village of Rostherne, Cheshire, was used as the Thompson/Bannerman house. The stables where Amanda and subsequently Rebecca ran their business were in the nearby Tatton Park estate (the stables have since been converted into a coffee shop/restaurant). The Thompsons' garage was Ashley Smithy Garage in Ashley and The Railway Pub can be found in Heatley. Fiona Lewis and Simon Bannerman got married in St Oswald's church, Lower Peover (which also featured in Revelations) and the aborted first wedding of Amanda Thompson and Neil Brooks was in St Mary's church, Nether Alderley.

== Repeats ==
The series was repeated in full on analogue satellite channel Granada Plus when it launched on 1 October 1996. The run concluded on Friday 26 June 1998, replaced by Emmerdale from Monday 29 June 1998, beginning with episodes dating from 1989. Sky Soap also broadcast the series, weekdays at 1.15pm, from 1 September 1997 to 26 November 1998.
