= Noah Huntley =

English actor and model (born 1974)

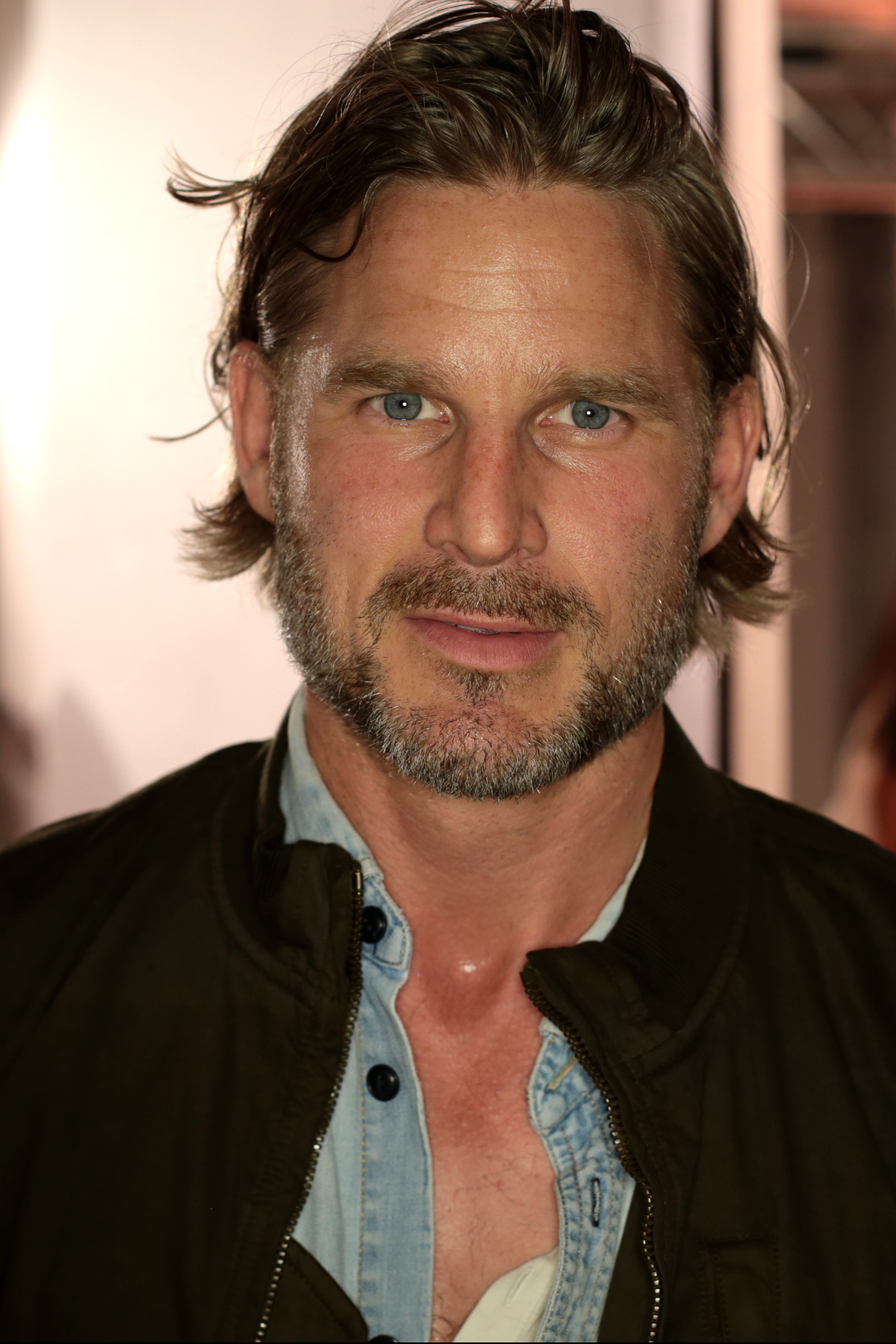
- Huntley in 2016
- Born: Noah Cornelius Marmaduke Huntley; 7 September 1974 (age 51); Wiston, West Sussex, England
- Occupations: Actor; model
- Modeling information
- Height: 6 ft 1 in (1.85 m)
- Hair color: Brown
- Eye color: Blue
- Agency: Independent Talent; Next Management

Noah Cornelius Marmaduke Huntley (born 7 September 1974) is an English actor and model. He has appeared in films such as 28 Days Later (2002), The Chronicles of Narnia: The Lion, the Witch and the Wardrobe (2005), Snow White and the Huntsman (2012) and Dracula Untold (2014).

== Early life ==
Huntley was born in Wiston, West Sussex, the son of Karen and Graham Huntley. He grew up as one of eight on a Sussex farm. He was educated at Windlesham House School in Pulborough, Sussex, Our Lady of Sion School in Worthing, at Leighton Park School in Berkshire, and Collyer's VI Form College in Horsham, Sussex.

== Career ==
His early acting career included roles in Birds of a Feather, he also played Luke McAllister from 1993 to 1995 in the British soap opera Emmerdale. He went on to star alongside Dominic West and Josh Lucas in True Blue and alongside Laurence Fishburne and Sam Neill in Event Horizon.

He then returned to TV, playing Harchester United Captain, Michael Dillon in the football drama Dream Team. In 2002, he starred in Danny Boyle's 28 Days Later alongside Cillian Murphy and Naomie Harris. He played Will Curtis in Holby City for the 2004–05 season and then went on to appear in numerous other feature films, including Snow White and the Huntsman in 2012 and Dracula Untold in 2015. In 2015 he also played the lover of Elizabeth Hurley's character in a multi-episode arc of the E! original series The Royals. Huntley has been filming a pilot in Northern Ireland of The Pardoner's Tale, and since 2019 he has been working as a series regular on the CW science fiction series Pandora, playing Professor Donovan Osborn.

As a fashion model, he has appeared in campaigns for Bloomingdales, Paul Smith, Jigsaw, Cacharel and Nautica. He has shot with Annie Leibovitz for Stella Artois and Peter Lindbergh for L'Oreal. He has also appeared as a model in international editions of Vogue Hommes, Esquire and GQ.

== Filmography ==
=== Film ===
Year	Title	Role	Notes
1996	True Blue	Nick Bonham	
1997	Event Horizon	Burning man / Edward Corrick	
1999	Tom's Midnight Garden	James (20 years)	
2001	Megiddo: The Omega Code 2	Stone Alexander (age 21)	
2002	28 Days Later	Mark	
2005	The Chronicles of Narnia: The Lion, the Witch and the Wardrobe	Older Peter Pevensie	
2008	Dark Floors	Ben	
2011	Your Highness	Head Knight	
2011	Le Skylab	Jonathan	
2012	Snow White and the Huntsman	King Magnus	
2013	Jappeloup	Joe Fargis	
2014	Dracula Untold	Captain Petru	
2015	Miss You Already	Company Exec	
2017	Middleground	Man	
2018	Paul, Apostle of Christ	Publius	

=== Television ===
Year	Title	Role	Notes
1987	Drummonds	Eavis	Episode: "Beggars Can't Be Choosers"
1987–1990	The Ruth Rendell Mysteries	John Burden	15 episodes
1989	Tom's Midnight Garden	James	Miniseries
1992	Nice Town	Nigel Dobson	Miniseries; 3 episodes
1993–1995	Emmerdale	Luke McAllister	Role held: 14 December 1993 – 1 August 1995
1994	Moonacre	Robin Loveday	Miniseries
1995	Shooting Stars	Himself	Contestant
1998	Birds of a Feather	Dominic	Episode: "Can't Judge a Book"
1998–1999	Dream Team	Michael Dillon	unknown episodes
1999	The Cyberstalking	Jack	Television film
2001	The Mists of Avalon	Gawain	Miniseries
2001	Midsomer Murders	Noel Wooliscroft	Episode: "Who Killed Cock Robin?"
2002	Where the Heart Is	Davey Ludford	Episode: "Don't Let Go"
2003	The Inspector Lynley Mysteries	Cliff Hegarty	Episode: "Deception on His Mind"
2004	Real Crime	John Tanner	Episode: "Love You to Death"
2004–2005	Holby City	Will Curtis	Main role (series 6–7)
2006	The Afternoon Play	Gary	Episode: "Your Mother Should Know"
2006	I Shouldn't Be Alive	Warren Macdonald	Episode: "Trapped Under a Boulder"
2007	A&E	Himself	Narrator
2008	The Summit	Danny	Miniseries
2011	Midsomer Murders	Aidan Hardy	Episode: "The Sleeper Under the Hill"
2012	Homefront	Martin	Miniseries; episode 6
2013	The Beautiful Spy	John Faber-Prentiss	Television film
2015	The Royals	Alistair Lacey	Recurring role (seasons 1–2)
2017–2018	Free Rein	Elliott	Main role
2019	Harry & Meghan: Becoming Royal	Caspian	Television film
2019–2020	Pandora	Donovan Osborn	Main role
2021	Days of Our Lives: Beyond Salem	Lord Sebastian Alamain	Miniseries, 1 episode
2023	Days of Our Lives	Lord Sebastian Alamain	1 episode
