= Billy Hartman =

Scottish actor

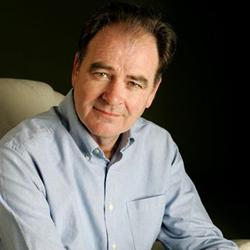

Billy Hartman (born 1957) is a Scottish actor, well known for playing the part of Terry Woods on ITV's Emmerdale from 1995 until his character was killed off in 2011.

== Career ==
Together with Emmerdale co-stars Steve Halliwell and Alun Lewis, Hartman was a member of UK 1990s country rock trio The Woolpackers, who had a UK hit single, "Hillbilly Rock Hillbilly Roll", in November 1996.

He also played a small role, Dougal MacLeod, cousin of Connor McLeod, in the film Highlander.

Under the name GBH, Hartman was the host of the rock 'n' roll revival television show Oh Boy! in 1979.

He also starred in the comedy series Russ Abbot's Madhouse in the early 1980s.

Hartman played a teenager in the 1980s American horror film Slaughter High.

He appeared as Isaac Talentire in the original West End production of Howard Goodall's musical The Hired Man.

Hartman played Billy in an episode, "Windows", of Minder.

In 1993, he appeared in The Bill, playing Superintendent Greenall of the area major incident pool.

Hartman appeared as Dave Slade, whose dog was attacking sheep, in the 1994 Heartbeat episode "Wild Thing".

In 1994, he played probation officer Dave Cowden in the A Touch of Frost episode "Minority" and appeared as Caiaphas on the studio cast album of Jesus Christ Superstar.

On 26 October 2013, Hartman played Graham O'Reilly in Casualty. In 2015, he was in the London revival of the musical Gypsy.

== Filmography ==
| Year | Title | Role | Notes |
|---|---|---|---|
| 1986 | Highlander | Dougal MacLeod | |
| 1986 | Slaughter High | Frank | |
