= Amanda Wenban =

Amanda Wenban is an actress who has worked in television in both the United Kingdom and Australia.

Her credits include Inspector Morse, A Bit of a Do, Families, Home and Away, Revelations, All Saints and Farscape: The Peacekeeper Wars.

She was a regular cast member on the soap opera Emmerdale, playing Angharad McAllister from 1993 to 1995.
