= Lisa Riley =

English actress and presenter (born 1976)

Lisa Riley MBE
- Born: Lisa Jane Riley; 13 July 1976 (age 50); Bury, Greater Manchester, England
- Occupations: Actress; presenter
- Years active: 1993–present
- Known for: Role of Mandy Dingle in Emmerdale
- Television: Emmerdale (1995–2001, 2019–present); You've Been Framed! (1998–2002); Fat Friends (2002–2005); Strictly Come Dancing (2012–2014, 2017); Loose Women (1999, 2006–2013, 2016–2021); I'm a Celebrity...Get Me Out of Here! (2025)
- Partner: Al Benković (2014-present)

Lisa Jane Riley (born 13 July 1976) is an English actress and television presenter. She is best known for playing Mandy Dingle in the long-running ITV soap opera Emmerdale between 1995 and 2001, and from 2019 onwards. She replaced Jeremy Beadle as the presenter of You've Been Framed! between 1998 and 2002. She also appeared as a contestant on the tenth series of Strictly Come Dancing in 2012 and the twenty-fifth series of I'm a Celebrity...Get Me Out of Here!, finishing in fifth place on both. Riley has appeared sporadically as a panelist on the ITV daytime series Loose Women.

== Career ==
Riley trained at the Oldham Theatre Workshop from the age of nine, and was signed by an agent three years later. Riley's early roles included appearances as an extra in both Coronation Street and Brookside as well as a cast member in Butterfly Kiss which was directed by Michael Winterbottom. She then appeared in a guest role as Mandy Dingle in the British soap opera Emmerdale in 1995. After proving popular with the audience, Riley was invited to join the soap's regular cast the following year. In 1996, Riley won the National Television Awards for "Most Popular Newcomer" for her work in Emmerdale. She continued to play Mandy until 2001 after deciding to pursue other television roles.

Riley played Princess Jean in the CITV Awards 1997, and also presented You've Been Framed! between 1998 and 2002, taking over from the former presenter, Jeremy Beadle and raising viewers figures to more than 13 million at its peak in the process. Riley even appeared on You've Been Framed! herself, in a clip one of her old school friends sent to the show, which the crew didn't tell her about beforehand.

In 1999, Riley co-presented the six-part ITV series Birthrace 2000 with Davina McCall, which featured couples trying to have the first baby of the millennium.

Riley featured as Rebecca Patterson, a "shy, retiring, twenty something" woman, in the drama series Fat Friends across three series between 2002 and 2005. Riley played Goody McEldrich in a 2011 episode of the UK children's show 'Young Dracula', and during 2012, she appeared as Nadia Hicks in the second series of ITV crime drama, Scott & Bailey. Between 2011 and 2013, Riley made guest appearance as Tina Allen in the BBC school drama Waterloo Road. Later that year, Riley signed up as a contestant on the tenth series of Strictly Come Dancing, partnering with Robin Windsor. Riley juggled the rehearsals for Strictly Come Dancing with filming two appearances for Waterloo Road in February 2013. The couple were eliminated during the semi-finals, on 16 December 2012. She has since appeared on the 2013 live tour and the backstage show Strictly Confidential, directed by Craig Revel Horwood, who often praised her on the show.

In September 2016, it was announced that Riley had joined the ITV daytime series Loose Women as one of three new panelists, following a series of guest appearances during the year. In May 2017, Riley featured in the BBC miniseries Three Girls as Lorna, the mother of one of the main characters. In August 2018, Riley starred in another BBC drama, Age Before Beauty, as Tina Reegan, a gothic tattoo artist. Riley's return to Emmerdale for one storyline was announced on 13 November 2018. The character returned for a guest stint from January 2019. She later returned full-time from September 2019.

In November 2025, after having turned down the show several times, it was announced that Riley would appear as a contestant on the twenty-fifth series of I'm a Celebrity...Get Me Out of Here!. On 5 December, she was eliminated alongside Jack Osbourne finishing in 5th place.

== Personal life ==
In late 2016, Riley lost over 10 stone in weight, and a year later, she had a surgery to remove excess skin.

Riley was appointed Member of the Order of the British Empire (MBE) in the 2026 Birthday Honours for services to drama and to charity.

== Stage roles and filmography ==
=== Theatre ===
Years	Title	Role	Location
1999–2000	Dick Whittington	Fairy Bowbells	Bradford Alhambra
2000–2001	Dick Whittington	Fairy Bowbells	Wolverhampton Grand
2001–2002	Aladdin	Slave of the Ring	Grand Opera House, Belfast
2002–2004	Goldilocks and the Three Bears	Ringmaster	Swansea Grand Theatre Darlington Civic Theatre
2004–2005	Cinderella	Fairy Godmother	Regent Theatre, Stoke-on-Trent
2005–2007	Jack and the Beanstalk	Fairy	Venue Cymru Kings Theatre, Southsea
2007–2008	Aladdin	Slave of the Ring	Southport Theatre
2008–2009	Cinderella	Fairy Godmother	Plaza Cinema, Stockport
2009–2010	Aladdin	Slave of the Ring	Kings Theatre, Southsea
2010–2011	Cinderella	Fairy Godmother	Grand Opera House, York
2011–2014	Snow White and the Seven Dwarfs	Wicked Queen Queen Malevola Lisa - The Lady's Maid	Kings Theatre, Southsea Cliffs Pavilion Princess Theatre, Torquay
2014–2015	Jack and the Beanstalk	Spirit of the Beans	Lyceum Theatre, Crewe
2015–2016	Jack and the Beanstalk	The Spirit of the Beans	Bradford Alhambra
2016–2017	Aladdin	Slave of the Ring	Wolverhampton Grand
2017–2018	Jack and the Beanstalk	Fairy	Wolverhampton Grand
2018–2019	Beauty and the Beast	Mrs Potts	New Theatre, Cardiff

=== Film ===
Year	Title	Role	Notes
1995	Butterfly Kiss	Danielle	
1996	The Woolpackers: Emmerdance	Mandy Dingle	Emmerdale spin-off video
1997	Emmerdale: The Dingles Down Under	Mandy Dingle	Emmerdale spin-off video
1999	Emmerdale: Don't Look Now! - The Dingles in Venice	Mandy Dingle	Emmerdale spin-off video
2000	Secret Society	Beth Trailor; Amazon Woman No. 1	
2006	Six Bend Trap	Mary Myrani	

=== Television ===
Year	Title	Role	Notes
1994	Coronation Street	Bettabuy Worker (uncredited)	Episode #3666
1995	Blood & Peaches	Julie	Part one
1995–2001, 2019–present	Emmerdale	Mandy Dingle	Series regular
1996	Hetty Wainthropp Investigates	Lilian	Episode: Widdershins
1997	Flight	Unnamed	Television film
1998–2002	You've Been Framed!	Presenter	
1999	Put Out More Fags	Cath	Television film
1999	Birthrace 2000	Presenter	6 part TV series also known as Birth Race 2000 Tonight's the Night, Birth Race 2000 Animal Passions, Birth Race 2000 A-Z of Conception and Birth Race 2000 On the Job with Lisa Riley, along with a preview episode titled Birth Race 2000 On Your Marks.
1999, 2006, 2007, 2013, 2016–2018, 2020, 2021 2026-present	Loose Women	Herself	Guest; regular panellist; 69 episodes
2000	Aladdin	Princess's Handmaiden	Television film
2002–2005	Fat Friends	Rebecca Patterson	Main role (series 2–4)
2002	Having It Off	Frankie Brookes	
2003	The Afternoon Play	Helen	Episode: "Heroes and Villains"
2003, 2012	Doctors	Sandra Reynolds; Laura Mowbray	2 episodes
2003	The Bill	Belinda	Episode: "143: Bold as Brass"
2006	Holby City	Lyn Forbes	Episode: "Pride Before a Fall"
2011	Young Dracula	Goody McEldrich	Episode: "The Enemy Within"
2011–2013	Waterloo Road	Tina Allen	6 episodes
2012	Scott & Bailey	Nadia Hicks	2 episodes
2012, 2013, 2014, 2017	Strictly Come Dancing	Herself; Reporter; Superfan Quiz Host; Friday Panel	Contestant (5th Place)
2014	Inspector George Gently	Sylvia Ryan	Episode: "Blue for Bluebird"
2014	Moving On	Moira	Episode: "The Signature"
2017	Three Girls	Lorna Bowen	Main character
2017	Lisa Riley's Baggy Body Club	Presenter	
2018	Age Before Beauty	Tina Reegan	Main character
2025	I'm a Celebrity...Get Me Out of Here!	Herself	Contestant; (Finished 5th) series 25

Guest appearances

- This Morning (2001, 2012, 2013, 2019, 2020)
- The Alan Titchmarsh Show (2009)
- The Wright Stuff (2009) – Guest panelist
- Strictly Come Dancing: It Takes Two (2012, 2013, 2014)
- Let's Dance for Sport Relief (2013)
- Lorraine (2013, 2016, 2018, 2020)
- Keep It in the Family (2015)

== Awards and nominations ==
Year	Award	Category	Work	Result	Ref.
1996	2nd National Television Awards	Most Popular Newcomer	Emmerdale	Won	
1999	5th National Television Awards	Most Popular Actress	Emmerdale	Nominated	
2004	TV Quick Awards	Best Actress	Fat Friends	Nominated	
2020	Inside Soap Awards	Best Actress	Emmerdale	Nominated	
2020	Inside Soap Awards	Best Partnership (shared with Bradley Johnson)	Emmerdale	Nominated	
2020	Inside Soap Awards	Funniest Performance	Emmerdale	Shortlisted	
2021	26th National Television Awards	Serial Drama Performance	Emmerdale	Nominated	
2021	Inside Soap Awards	Best Actress	Emmerdale	Nominated	
2022	2022 British Soap Awards	Best Comedy Performance	Emmerdale	Nominated	
2022	Inside Soap Awards	Best Comic Performance	Emmerdale	Nominated	
2024	RadioTimes.com Soap Awards	Best Comedy Performance	Emmerdale	Pending	

== See also ==
- List of Strictly Come Dancing contestants

Preceded by Jeremy Beadle	Host of You've Been Framed! 1998–2002	Succeeded by Jonathan Wilkes
