= Jacqueline Pirie =

Scottish actress

- Born: Jacqueline Pirie; 10 October 1975 (age 50); Stirling, Scotland, United Kingdom
- Occupations: Actress (1984–2001), author
- Spouse: Simon Chadwick (2001–present)
- Awards: Best Storyline - British Soap Awards (2001; Won); Most Popular Actress - National Television Awards (1996; Nominated)

Jacqueline Chadwick (née Pirie, born 10 October 1975) is a Scottish former actress and novelist from Stirling, Scotland. She is best known for her roles in the ITV soap operas Emmerdale (1994–1996) and Coronation Street (1998–2001), playing Tina Dingle and Linda Sykes, respectively.

== Early life ==
Born in Stirling, Pirie moved with her family to Birmingham, England when she was five. She attended Sunnyside Primary School Stirling, Paganell Primary School in Selly Oaks, Birmingham and King Norton's Girls School and 6th form. After leaving school she attended The Birmingham Theatre School and Red Lens Drama School for Television Acting.

== Acting career ==
In 1984 at the age of nine Jacqueline appeared on an episode of the ITV soap opera Crossroads.

Following some guest roles on television, Pirie made her film debut in 1994, playing Mary in the British war film Culloden 1746. She then appeared on ITV's Emmerdale as Tina Dingle between 1994 and 1996. For this, she was nominated in the category of Most Popular Actress at the National Television Awards. Next, she began playing factory machinist Linda Sykes on Coronation Street, where she appeared between 1998 and 2001. The storyline involving her character's love triangle with her employer, Mike Baldwin, and his son, Mark, won Best Storyline at the 2001 British Soap Awards.

== Teaching ==
In 2004, Pirie began teaching drama and running her own performing arts workshop, the "Jacqueline Chadwick Academy of Performing Arts".

In 2007, she set up a drama school in her hometown of Stirling. She opened one of her drama schools in Campbell River, British Columbia, Canada, before moving it to Victoria, British Columbia, where she now resides.

== Novels ==
Since leaving the acting industry, Pirie has been writing a series of thriller novels, published under her married name, Jacqueline Chadwick.

- In The Still (Ali Dalglish Book 1) (2017) Fahrenheit Press
- Briefly Maiden (Ali Dalglish Book 2) (2019) Fahrenheit Press
- Silent Sisters (Ali Dalglish Book 3) (TBA) Fahrenheit Press
