= The Half-Hearted =

1900 novel by John Buchan

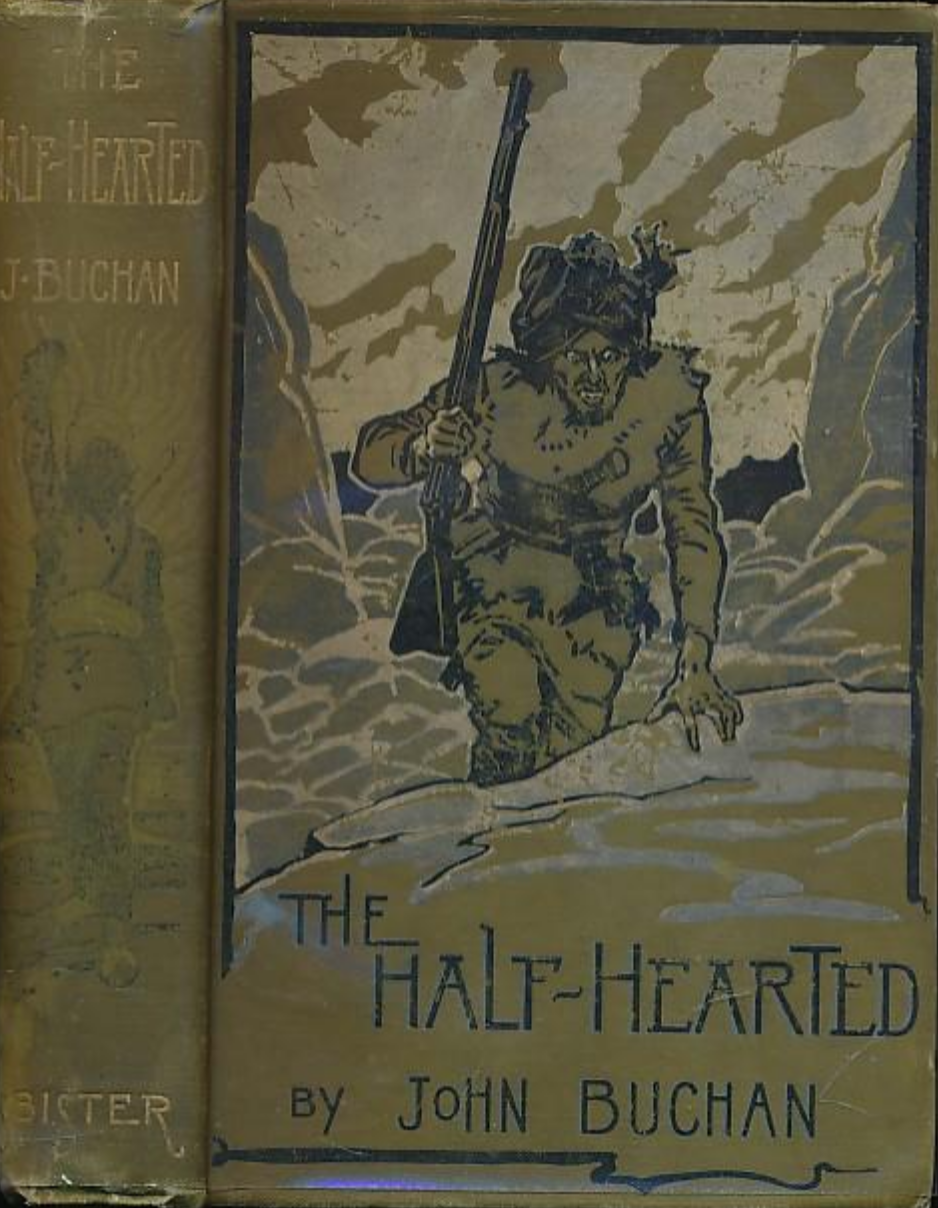
- Author: John Buchan
- Language: English
- Genre: Thriller, Novel
- Set in: Scotland, India
- Publisher: Isbister & Co
- Publication date: 1900
- Media type: Print
- Pages: 375

The Half-Hearted is a 1900 novel of romance and adventure by the Scottish author John Buchan. It was Buchan's first novel in a modern setting and was written when he was 24 while working for an All-Souls fellowship and reading for the bar.

== Plot introduction ==
The Half-Hearted is a novel in two parts: part I is a story of manners and romance in upper class Scotland, while part II is an action tale of adventure and duty in northern India. The novel is set in the closing years of the 19th century and explores the way in which the social expectations of the main characters shape the paths they must tread. It follows the life of Lewis Haystoun, a young Scottish laird, who finds himself unable to commit wholeheartedly to any course of action. His failure to seize the opportunity results in the woman he loves agreeing to marry a rival. Determined to face up to what he considers to be his cowardice, Haystoun departs for the Empire's north west frontier where he dies attempting to hold a narrow mountain pass single-handedly against an invading Cossack army.

== Plot ==
When his local Member of Parliament decides to retire, Lewis Haystoun is persuaded to stand. Although he is liked and respected by his local tenants, he finds himself unable to speak wholeheartedly and with full conviction at the hustings and is beaten by his opponent, the ambitious and fluent social climber Albert Stocks. Following an initial meeting at a dinner party, both Haystoun and Stocks fall in love with Alice Wishart, the daughter of a rich city merchant. Miss Wishart initially favours Haystoun, but gradually becomes disenchanted with his apparent lack of ability to commit to anything. During a picnic on the moors, Miss Wishart slips and falls into a lake. Haystoun, standing beside her, hesitates just long enough to allow his rival to dive in and make the rescue. Haystoun is devastated, believes himself to be a coward and avoids Miss Wishart's company, pushing her more and more into the company of Stocks. Stocks asks her to marry him and, believing that Haystoun is not interested in her, she agrees.

Rumours have reached the British Government of a possible danger to the Empire via an uncharted area of the northern Indian frontier. Haystoun has explored this area before, and when he is asked by a friend to go out again to reconnoitre in a semi-official capacity, he jumps at the chance to escape his situation and to prove his courage. The night before his departure, Haystoun and Miss Wishart meet and declare their mutual love for the first time. Although there would still be time for Miss Wishart to break off her engagement, the pair feel that they have been 'set apart by the fates' and they separate to follow their own individual paths.

In part II of the novel, Haystoun travels to the northern frontier lands where he learns of a Russian plot to invade India via a little-known narrow mountain pass in the Kashmir, with the help of the local hill tribes. Having become aware of an imminent Cossack attack, Haystoun sends word to the local fort, calling on them to telegraph warnings to the northern garrisons and settlements, and sets off alone to try to delay the invaders at the pass. There he dies heroically, but is able to delay the invasion for just time enough for the alarm to be raised and for defences to be put in place. The Empire is saved by his valiant efforts.

== Themes ==
The novel embodies a type of plot common in late Victorian and early Edwardian popular fiction in which the lethargic, anxious, and self-doubting upper middle class British protagonist is revived and rennervated through exposure to the British Empire. Lewis Haystoun and his participation in 'the Great Game' sees him not only foil a Russian invasion but also master his crippling ennui and become awakened to the purpose of empire. The title of the novel, The Half-Hearted, reflects Haystoun's initial character. Other books of the period which reflect these themes include Arthur Conan Doyle's The Tragedy of the Korosko (1898), Anthony Hope's The Prisoner of Zenda (1893), and A.E.W. Mason's The Four Feathers (1902).

== Critical reception ==
In Clubland Heroes (1953, revised 1974), Richard Usborne suggested that this novel is in some ways more revealing of the Buchan 'decent-fellow' ethic than any other till the last, Sick Heart River, with Haystoun's death to some extent foreshadowing that of Edward Leithen in the later work. Buchan was only 25 when he completed The Half-Hearted, and had not at that stage quite found his wavelength. But in Haystoun there is much of his later characters Sandy Arbuthnot and Richard Hannay.

David Daniell, writing in 1975, considered the novel to be flawed but interesting. He felt the book weakest in its depiction of London clubs and upper class manners and conversation, but noted other areas that show "flashes of the true Buchan gift". Buchan worked through several of the themes that did not quite succeed in this novel, and returned to them with more assurance in later years, particularly in Mr Standfast (1919), Huntingtower (1922) and John Macnab (1925).

Writing for the John Buchan Society website in 2001, Christine Drews noted that this novel is the one most influenced by John Buchan's study of Greek tragedy. She held that the work's conclusion illumines a path of understanding that can provide perspective on small real-life disappointments and missed satisfactions. The telescoping of the immensity of a single gifted man's death into a purposeful cog in the turning of the wheel of eternity is a foreign, yet broadening philosophy, which shakes the reader's complacency. She concluded that the book is a difficult one to enjoy, but a compelling one to contemplate.

Andrew Lownie, in his 2013 biography The Presbyterian Cavalier, called the novel 'a very uneven book' that reflects Buchan's attempt to reconcile the differing attitudes to life of his Oxford circle: with the 'careless and gay' Lewis Haystoun contrasting with 'the world's iron and salt' represented by the author himself.

== Bibliography ==
- Daniell, David (1975). The Interpreter's House. London: Nelson. ISBN 0-17-146051-0.
