= Charles Lamancha =

Fictional character created by John Buchan

Charles, Earl of Lamancha is a fictional character who appears in several novels by John Buchan.

Lord Lamancha is a war veteran, having served in Palestine with Lovat’s Scouts; a noble, being the heir to his father, the Marquis of Liddesdale; and a politician, being an MP and Cabinet Minister. He is a good friend of John Palliser-Yeates and Edward Leithen, joining them for the sporting challenge of John Macnab.

== Appearances ==
- John Macnab (1925)
- The Gap in the Curtain
- The House of the Four Winds
- A Prince of the Captivity
- The Runagates Club
- The Island of Sheep (1936) (brief mention only)
