= The Runagates Club =

1928 short story collection by John Buchan

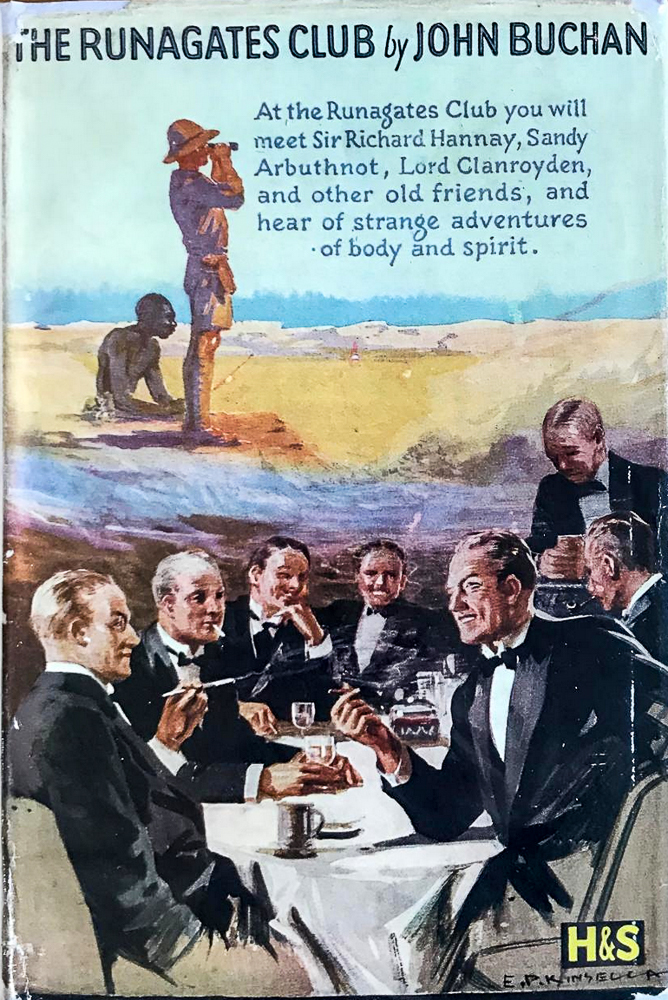
- First edition cover
- Author: John Buchan
- Language: English
- Genre: Short story collection
- Publisher: Hodder & Stoughton
- Publication date: 1928
- Media type: Print
- Pages: 331

The Runagates Club is a 1928 collection of short stories by the Scottish author John Buchan. The collection consists of twelve tales presented as reminiscences of members of The Runagates Club, a London dining society. Several of the stories are recounted by recurrent characters in Buchan’s fiction, including Richard Hannay, Sandy Arbuthnot, John Palliser-Yeates, Charles Lamancha, and Edward Leithen.

== Contents ==
The stories are entitled:

- The Green Wildebeest: Sir Richard Hannay’s Story
- The Frying Pan and the Fire: The Duke of Burminster’s Story
  - 1. The Frying-Pan
  - 2. The Fire
- Dr Lartius: Mr Palliser-Yeates’s Story
- The Wind in the Portico: Mr Henry Nightingale's Story
- ’Divus’ Johnston: Lord Lamancha's Story
- The Loathly Opposite: Major Oliver Pugh's Story
- Sing a Song of Sixpence: Sir Edward Leithen's Story
- Ship to Tarshish: Mr Ralph Collatt's Story
- Skule Skerry: Mr Anthony Hurrell's Story
- 'Tendebant Manus': Sir Arthur Warcliffe's Story
- The Last Crusade: Mr Francis Martendale's Story
- Fullcircle: Mr Martin Peckwether's Story

== Title ==
The book's title alludes to the "execrable" quality of the Runagates Club's food and wine. According to Buchan's preface, it derives from Psalm 68: "He letteth the runagates continue in scarceness." The fourth word is frequently translated as "rebellious".

== Critical reception ==
The stories are "pleasingly diverse in subject, incident and treatment" according to a contemporary reviewer in the Times Literary Supplement.

Brian Stableford praised "The Green Wildebeest" as "a well-executed story", and described "Skule Skerry", "Tendebant Manus", and "Fullcircle" as "tales of subtle hauntings, told with a delicacy with Buchan rarely bothered to bring to his hurriedly-penned novels."

Andrew Lownie, in John Buchan: The Presbyterian Cavalier (2013) noted that this work, Buchan's only collection of post First World War short stories, is unique in including all of his major characters. He held the stories to be beautifully self-contained, and to demonstrate "the usual Buchan themes of an unwitting amateur drawn into adventure and the fragile division between civilisation and chaos".
