= John Palliser-Yeates =

Fictional character created by John Buchan

John Palliser-Yeates is a fictional character created by John Buchan. He appears in several Buchan novels, notably John Macnab.

He is a banker and sportsman, and an old school friend of Edward Leithen and Charles Lamancha.

== Appearances ==
- John Macnab (1925)
- The Runagates Club
- The Three Hostages
- The Courts of the Morning (1929)
