= Archie Roylance =

Fictional Character by John Buchan

Sir Archibald Roylance was a fictional character created by John Buchan. He appeared in many Buchan novels, never as the protagonist. He was a good friend of Richard Hannay and Edward Leithen despite being younger than them.

According to one writer:

In no novel is Roylance a protagonist, but usually, and less and less reluctantly, drawn into the affairs of others. Apart from Dougal and Jaikie of the Gorbals Diehards he is younger by a dozen years or more than all Buchan's paladins, a d'Artagnan among the Musketeers, and mostly they deal with him in avuncular fashion, but, ignored, mocked, overruled, he has their respect as well as their affection. Although he never attains their stature we are aware of achievement and potential. Buchan seems determined not to lose sight of Archie Roylance and returns to him repeatedly, dropping stitches which he will later pick up, so that he appears a character recollected rather than invented.

In John Macnab Archie meets, falls in love with and proposes to Janet. He is running for the local seat as a Conservative MP and gets a great deal of inspiration from Janet for his political views.

== Appearances ==
- Mr Standfast (1919),
- Huntingtower (1922),
- The Three Hostages (1924),
- John Macnab (1925),
- The Courts of the Morning (1929)
- The House of the Four Winds (1935)
- referred to in The Island of Sheep (1936) and Sick Heart River (1941).
