= Blackwood Brothers =

Blackwood Brothers may refer to:

- Blackwood (publishing house), 1804–1980, a Scottish publisher and printer
- The Blackwood Brothers, an American southern gospel quartet
