= Roylance =

Roylance is a surname. Notable people with the surname include:

- Archie Roylance, fictional character in several novels by John Buchan (1875–1940)
- Jayne Roylance (1947–2018), English lawn bowls player
- Pamela Roylance (born 1952), American actress
- Robert Roylance, Australian politician
