= The Power-House =

1916 novel by John Buchan

- UK cover
- Author: John Buchan
- Language: English
- Series: Edward Leithen
- Genre: Novel
- Publisher: W Blackwood & Sons
- Publication date: 1916
- Publication place: Scotland
- Media type: Print
- Pages: 238
- Followed by: John Macnab

The Power-House is a 1916 novel by John Buchan, published by W. Blackwood & Sons after an initial 1913 serialisation in Blackwood's Magazine. A thriller set in London, the novel is the first of five featuring the barrister and Tory MP Edward Leithen.

== Plot ==
The story's narrator, Edward Leithen, is a promising young barrister and Member of Parliament. His friend, Tommy Deloraine, tells him about the recent mysterious disappearance of the eccentric adventurer Charles Pitt-Heron. Pitt-Heron has a reputation for dashing off abroad on a variety of madcap schemes, and initially it seems that he may have departed of his own accord. Pitt-Heron's wife Ethel, a woman Leithen retains a soft spot for, having been romantically attracted to her in the past, is perplexed. When Ethel discovers the draft of a letter her husband was evidently preparing to send her, warning of terrible danger, Tommy decides to track Pitt-Heron down.

Pitt-Heron has inadvertently become involved in an international criminal organisation known as "the Power-House", led by the rich art connoisseur Andrew Lumley, and has been forced to flee. In Central Asia, Pitt-Heron is chased by Lumley's agent Saranov, and by his right-hand man, Roth (otherwise known as Tuke the butler). With help from Macgillivray at Scotland Yard and Felix, a friend at the embassy, Leithen arranges for the border posts between Samarkand and Bokhara to be watched. Pitt-Heron, Tommy, and the two followers are identified.

Leithen finds that he is himself being watched in London. He takes into his confidence Tommy's close friend, a burly Labour MP called Chapman. Leithen receives a telephone call apparently from Macgillivray, suggesting dinner at a quiet restaurant in Antioch Street, and only after finding himself imprisoned in an upper room does he realise the call had been faked. He is rescued by the timely arrival of Chapman, who is delighted to have an opportunity to use his fists. Felix reports that Pitt-Heron and Tommy have been rescued, that one of the hunters has been killed and the other has confessed.

Now fully aware of Leithen's involvement, Lumley re-doubles his watchers and makes arrangements to have Leithen murdered. Holed up in his London flat with Chapman, Leithen eventually manages to make his escape and find his way to the embassy where he explains all to the Ambassador. He writes a letter to Macgillivray setting out his evidence, and asks that it be handed to him at 9.30 that evening. In the meantime, he drives to Lumley's London house for a final confrontation. In order to avoid further distress to the already-traumatised Ethel Pitt-Heron, Leithen offers to have the whole affair hushed up if Lumley will take the opportunity to catch the boat train to Paris before 9.30, and never return. Lumley says he will think about it, but that he wants to consider other options.

Next morning, Leithen reads in the newspaper of Andrew Lumley's sudden overnight death from heart failure. The truth is suppressed, and Lumley is lionised in press reports for his learning, connoisseurship and philanthropy. Leithen has achieved his aim, and learns from Ethel's glowing face that her troubles are over.

== Principal characters ==
- Edward Leithen, barrister and MP
- Tommy Deloraine, his friend
- Charles Pitt-Heron, eccentric adventurer
- Ethel Pitt-Heron, his wife
- Andrew Lumley, head of the Power-House
- Josiah Routh (Tuke the butler), Lumley's right hand man
- Chapman, Labour MP
- Felix, Leithen's friend at the embassy
- Saranov, agent sent by Lumley to track Pitt-Heron
- Macgillivray, senior officer at Scotland Yard

== Dedication ==
Buchan dedicated his novel to Major-General Sir Francis Lloyd, saying "My Dear General, / A recent tale of mine has, I am told, found favour in the dug-outs and billets of the British front, as being sufficiently short and sufficiently exciting for men who have little leisure to read. My friends in that uneasy region have asked for more. So I have printed this story, written in the smooth days before the war, in the hope that it may enable an honest man here and there to forget for an hour the too urgent realities. I have put your name on it, because among the many tastes which we share one is a liking for precipitous yarns.

== Reception and analysis ==
"The dominant theme of Buchan's fiction is the fragility of civilisation," it has been said in the context of a discussion of The Power-House. What the critic Christopher Harvie calls "perhaps the most famous line in all Buchan" occurs during the first meeting between Leithen and Lumley, when the latter tells the former, "You think that a wall as solid as the earth separates civilisation from barbarism. I tell you the division is a thread, a sheet of glass" (Chapter 3). Harvie cites a comparable passage from the second volume of The Golden Bough, where Frazer speaks of "a solid layer of savagery beneath the surface of society," which, "unaffected by the superficial changes of religion and culture," is "a standing menace to civilisation. We seem to move on a thin crust which may at any time be rent by the subterranean forces slumbering beneath."

Talking to Lumley, Leithen is reminded of an encounter he once had in Tyrol with a "Nietzschean" German professor who told him, "Someday there will come the marriage of knowledge and will, and then the world will march." This quote has been described as prophetic of Nazism.
