= The Three Hostages (film) =

1977 British television film

- Based on: The Three Hostages by John Buchan
- Written by: John Prebble
- Directed by: Clive Donner
- Starring: Barry Foster; Diana Quick; John Castle; David Markham
- Country of origin: United Kingdom
- Original language: English

Production
- Running time: 85 minutes

Original release
- Release: 27 December 1977

The Three Hostages is a 1977 British television film directed by Clive Donner, produced by Mark Shivas, and starring Barry Foster as Richard Hannay, a retired British soldier who works occasionally for the British intelligence services, Diana Quick as Mary Hannay, John Castle as Dominick Medina, and David Markham as Greenslade. It was based on the 1924 John Buchan thriller novel The Three Hostages.

The story follows Hannay's attempt to recover three hostages taken prisoner by a shadowy criminal organisation.
