= Hilda von Einem =

Fictional character in the 1916 novel Greenmantle

Hilda von Einem is a fictional character in John Buchan's 1916 novel Greenmantle. She is a German femme fatale who masterminds a plot to stir up a Muslim jihad against the Allies. She has been described as a "glamorous but merciless female agent" and a "pale-blue-eyed northern goddess". Rosie White suggests that von Einem is a "trope loosely based on Mata Hari" and that she represents a "decadent, oriental sexuality".
