= The Gap in the Curtain =

1932 novel by John Buchan

- 1st edition dust jacket
- Author: John Buchan
- Language: English
- Genre: Science fiction novel
- Set in: United Kingdom
- Publisher: Hodder & Stoughton
- Publication date: 1932
- Media type: Print
- Pages: 315 pp

The Gap in the Curtain is a 1932 borderline science fiction novel by the Scottish author John Buchan. Part of the action is autobiographical, featuring the agonies of a contemporary up-and-coming politician. It explores the theory of serial time put forward by J W Dunne: Buchan had been reading An Experiment with Time.

== Plot ==
Buchan's novel opens with the narrator, Sir Edward Leithen, being introduced at a house party to the brilliant physicist and mathematician Professor Moe. Moe has been working on a new theory of time, and believes he has found a way of enabling people to see, as if through a 'gap in the curtain', details of a future event. He enlists several of the house party guests into an experiment. For several days, each has to apply his whole concentration to anticipate what will be printed on a chosen page of The Times newspaper exactly one year hence. The subjects' efforts are to be supported by mental and physical preparation and by the taking of an unspecified drug.

The professor gathers his subjects together and urges them to 'turn their eyes inwardly' as they stare at a blank sheet of paper. He explains that they will each see some text which will appear in that future copy of The Times. Arnold Tavenger, a city magnate, sees a note of a great combine of all the michelite producing interests of the world; David Mayot MP sees a report of a speech in the House by a member who, completely unexpectedly, has become prime minister; Reginald Daker sees his name as a member of an archaeological expedition to the Yucatán; and Sir Robert Goodeve and Captain Charles Ottery both read the announcements of their own deaths. The effort of bringing this about proves too much for Moe, and he collapses and dies.

The remaining chapters of the book follow the fortunes of the experimental subjects over the next 12 months. In each case the prediction comes true, though in an unexpected way. After a year of anticipation, Charles Ottery discovers that, as a result of a publishing error, the report he took to be of his own death is in fact a report of the death of another man of the same name.

== Critical reception ==
Writing in The Spectator, L. A. G. Strong called the book "confident, assured, and, within its chosen limits, masterly." JB Priestley for the Evening Standard suggested that Buchan's 'grand theme' would have been better as a single big novel with all the strands woven together, rather than what amounts to a series of short stories – "But I admire gallant versatility (which Mr Buchan has in abundance) and so I must not grumble. His Gap in the Curtain can be read with excitement and profit."

In The Interpreter's House (1975), David Daniell noted that this is a Huxleyish, complicated book which is heavy with satire about politics in England, international finance, and even about the motives behind interpretation. He considered it, like Buchan's The Dancing Floor, to be about insight, death and resurrection. The story of Charles Ottery is in his view "the one triumphant success in the book."
