= Mr Standfast =

1919 novel by John Buchan

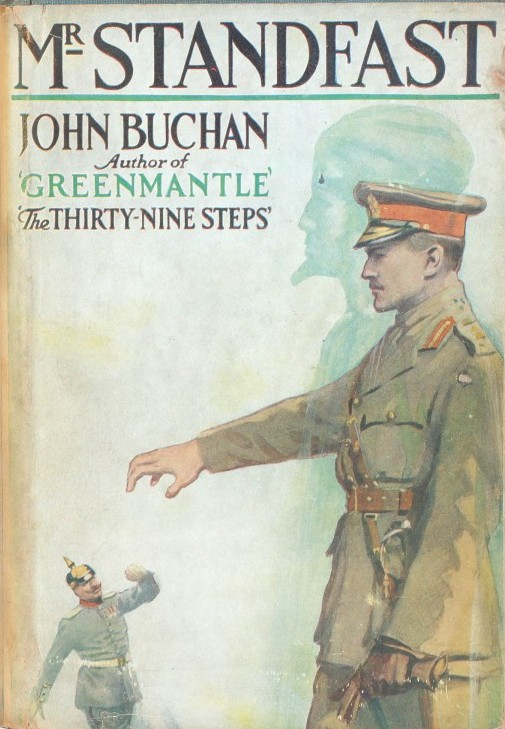
- First edition cover
- Author: John Buchan
- Language: English
- Series: Richard Hannay
- Genre: Thriller
- Publisher: Hodder & Stoughton, London
- Publication date: 1919
- Publication place: United Kingdom
- Media type: Print (Hardcover)
- Preceded by: Greenmantle
- Followed by: The Three Hostages

Mr Standfast is the third of five Richard Hannay novels by John Buchan, first published in 1919 by Hodder & Stoughton, London.

It is one of two Hannay novels set during the First World War, the other being Greenmantle (1916); Hannay's first and best-known adventure, The Thirty-Nine Steps (1915), is set in the period immediately before the war started.

The title refers to a character in John Bunyan's Pilgrim's Progress, to which there are many other references in the novel; Hannay uses a copy of Pilgrim's Progress to decipher coded messages from his contacts, and letters from his friend Peter Pienaar.

== Plot introduction ==
During the later years of the First World War Brigadier-General Hannay is recalled from active service on the Western Front to undertake a secret mission hunting for a dangerous German agent at large in Britain. Hannay is required to work undercover disguised as a pacifist, roaming the country incognito to investigate a German spy and his agents, and then heads to the Swiss Alps to save Europe from being overwhelmed by the German army.

== Plot summary ==
=== Part One ===
Dick Hannay, under forty and already a successful Brigadier-General with good prospects of advancement, is called out of uniform by his old comrade, spymaster Sir Walter Bullivant, and sent to Fosse Manor in the Cotswolds to receive further instructions. He must pose as a South African, an objector to the war, and once more takes on the name Cornelius Brand (an Anglicisation of the name he had used on his adventures in Germany in Greenmantle). He is upset by the idea of such a pose, but comforted by thoughts of his friend Peter Pienaar, briefly a successful airman and now a prisoner in Germany, and by the beauty of the Cotswold countryside.

At Fosse, he meets two middle-aged spinsters, their cousin Launcelot Wake, a conscientious objector, and their niece Mary Lamington, a girl whose prettiness had struck Hannay earlier, while visiting a shell-shocked friend in the hospital where she works. It emerges that she is his contact, but she can tell him little more than that he must immerse himself in the world of pacifists and objectors, picking up "atmosphere". She gives him a label to paste inside his watch, an address where he will be staying, and advises him to pick up a copy of Pilgrim's Progress. However, Mary gives Hannay some inkling of the gravity of his mission; "You and I and some hundred others are hunting the most dangerous man in all the world".

Hannay heads to Biggleswick, a small town full of artists and writers. He buries himself in their pacifist community, attending meetings at a local hall, and meets Moxon Ivery, a local bigwig who seems vaguely familiar; he also sees Mary about the place. He hears of his old comrade John Blenkiron, and one day the American appears at one of the town's meetings; he passes a message to Hannay, arranging to meet in London.

Blenkiron reveals that he has been hard at work for some time, around the world and undercover around England, on the track of a huge network of German spies and agents, with their head somewhere in Britain, leaking vital information to the enemy. He believes Ivery to be the spider at the centre of the web, but cannot prove it, and wants to use Ivery to feed misinformation to the Germans. He tells Hannay to try and head for Scotland and an American called Gresson, as he believes the information is being sent that way.

Hannay goes to Glasgow, and contacts a trade union shop steward named Amos, who is working undercover for Blenkiron's organization. Amos introduces Hannay to Gresson, an American who has reddish hair, small bright eyes and "a nose with a droop like a Polish Jew's." Hannay and Gresson are both invited to speak at a town meeting which descends into violence. They become embroiled in a street fight, in which he meets a big Fusilier named Geordie Hamilton. He later learns that Gresson makes regular boat trips up the coast, and plans to tag along.

He rides the foul boat, but realises he needs a passport to go all the way north, and must follow it on shore, dodging the law. He has a hint from his contact that a mine at a place called Ranna may be what he seeks, and hears the boat stops at an iron mine, so he resolves to head that way. He leaves the boat and treks inland, but soon finds he is wanted by the law, and is caught by some soldiers. He claims to be a soldier too, and their Colonel takes him home with him, to meet his son to check his story; the son confirms all Hannay's army knowledge, and suspicions are allayed.

He moves on, staying overnight with peasants, making his way onto Skye and towards Ranna. Arriving there, he meets Amos, who goes to fetch supplies, and sees the boat and Gresson, who meets a stranger on the hill. Hannay tracks the foreign-looking stranger, who Hannay describes as 'The Portuguese Jew', to a rocky bay, where the man disappears for a time before heading back. Hannay stays there overnight, and next morning fetches his provisions and searches the beach, finding the deep water of the bay ideal for submarines. He finds a hidden cave, and while preparing to lay in wait there sees Launcelot Wake climbing in. They fight and Hannay ties the other man up, but they soon realise they are on the same side.

They stake out the cave, and in the night the man Hannay followed returns, meeting with a German from the sea; they exchange pass-phrases, and Hannay sees the hiding place they plan to use to pass messages. Wake identifies some of their talk as extracts from Goethe, and is sent back with messages for Amos and Bullivant, while Hannay ponders the phrases he overheard - Bommaerts, Chelius, Elfenbein ('Ivory', homophone of 'Ivery'), Wild Bird and Caged Bird. He heads for home, but Amos warns him the police are still after him, and gives him a new disguise, as a travelling bookseller.

On the way south he takes up with another salesman, a man named Linklater who Amos had seen with Gresson. In a small town, Hannay is recognised by Geordie Hamilton, the big soldier he fought with in Glasgow, and flees once more with half the town, including Linklater, on his tail. He hides out in a troop train heading south; he gets off when it stops, is seen by Linklater, but at the station hooks up with his old pal Archie Roylance, a pilot who flies him on southwards. The plane breaks down, and Hannay, still pursued, flees afoot once more, upsetting a film set, stealing a bicycle and making his way into another town. On the verge of capture, his watch is stolen, and he is dragged off the streets by a man who recognises the badge he carries there; he is given a soldier's outfit and sent on his way.

He arrives in London in the midst of an air raid; in a tube station he sees Ivery, the spymaster's guard down in fear, and Hannay finally recognises him as one of the "Black Stone" men he had tangled with in The Thirty-Nine Steps. Hurrying to tell his colleagues, he is arrested as a deserter and delayed. He eventually gets word through to Macgillivray at Scotland Yard, but his enemy has two hours start and evades capture.

Hannay is encouraged by a letter from Peter Pienaar, and at a meeting with Bullivant, Blenkiron and Mary, he pushes for them to hound the man down. They discuss the clues Hannay overheard on the beach, and Ivery's fear of the bombing, and Mary reveals that Ivery has proposed to her.

=== Part Two ===
Hannay returns to the war in Europe for several months. He finds Geordie Hamilton, and employs him as his batman; he runs into Launcelot Wake, working as a support labourer behind the lines; he sees several adverts in English and German newspapers, which he suspects may be some kind of coded communication. Hamilton reports having seen Gresson in a party of touring visitors, and Hannay learns he had stayed behind in a small village for a time; he later hears a story of mysterious goings-on at a chateau near the same village.

Flying with Archie Roylance on a reconnoitre, they get lost in fog and land near the chateau in question, where Hannay sees a mysterious old woman in a gas mask. Finding the castle is in a vital strategic spot, he returns to investigate, and learns the place is leased by a man named Bommaerts, one of the words he had overheard on the beach in Skye. Sneaking into the house at night, he finds Mary there too, and learns she has seen Ivery, now calling himself Bommaerts, who is in love with her. They find anthrax powder and a newspaper with one of the adverts deciphered, and then Ivery arrives. Confronted by Hannay, he flees, and Hannay shoots after him; the chateau burns down.

A few days later, in January 1918, Hannay is withdrawn from the front for more special duties. Blenkiron gives dinner for Hannay and Mary, now engaged, where he learns that the newspaper advert scam has been broken up and its operatives, led by Gresson, arrested. Blenkiron has found a second code in the messages, used by Ivery and his masters, and has identified Ivery as the Graf von Schwabing, a former high-flyer unseated by scandal. He hears of the Wild Birds, a ruthless and deadly band of German spies, of whom Ivery is a leading member, and learns that they plan to head to Switzerland to pin Ivery down, using Mary as bait.

Hannay makes his way south to Switzerland, where he poses as an injured Swiss, servant to the crippled Peter Pienaar, who has been released there. The two catch up, swap stories, and await instructions, keeping an eye on the nearby Pink Chalet, believed to be the base of the Wild Birds. Finally receiving Blenkiron's instructions, Hannay goes one night to the chalet, where he meets his contact, but is betrayed and taken prisoner by von Schwabing. The German tells Hannay he plans to capture Mary too, and send them both back to Germany to deal with at his pleasure, while the German army attacks and crushes their enemies.

Von Schwabing leaves him pinned in an ancient rack, but he breaks free. He runs into the man he followed across Skye, and, using the pass-phrases he overheard there, poses as a conspirator. He is provided with a car and chases after von Schwabing, sending Peter to alert the others. After a long drive through the mountains, he crashes the car and runs the rest of the way, but arrives to find Mary already gone and Launcelot Wake waiting for him. Learning that von Schwabing is returning to the chalet the long way, they resolve to head over the mountains on foot, cutting out much of the road.

Wake, an experienced mountaineer, leads a tough climb through snow and ice, exhausting himself in the process. Hannay drags him to the safety of a cottage, then continues by train and again on foot. He arrives at the house, and staggers in, to see von Schwabing gloating over Blenkiron, who appears to have walked into the same trap Hannay had the night before. However, Blenkiron was warned by Hannay's message, and has the house in his command; Geordie Hamilton and Amos emerge and take von Schwabing prisoner.

At Hannay's suggestion, von Schwabing is sent to the front to see battle, while the others head to Paris, just as the Germans begin a mighty attack. As they near the front, they hear the defenses are crumbling beneath the onslaught, with Hannay's men at the heart of things. He resumes his command, and holds a thin line against the German advance, with Wake running messages for him, Blenkiron engineering the reserve trenches and Mary nursing in a nearby hospital. Amos and Hamilton guard von Schwabing, whose mind has gone strange.

A long and hard battle ensues, in the course of which Wake dies heroically, von Schwabing runs into No Man's Land and is shot by his countrymen, and Blenkiron joins the fray with a party of Americans. At the last, with reinforcements due any moment, a party of German planes overflies Hannay's position, and are sure to bear news of the weak point if allowed to return; British planes fly against them, but one, flown by flying ace Lensch, evades them. Peter Pienaar, flying Archie Roylance's plane despite his bad leg, flies into him, bringing him down and killing himself in the process, but the day is saved.

== Principal characters ==
- Brigadier-General Richard Hannay, tough soldier and occasional spy
- John Scantlebury Blenkiron, Hannay's friend, an American intelligence operative
- Peter Pienaar, an old friend of Hannay, an ace pilot taken prisoner by the Germans
- Geordie Hamilton, a Scottish soldier whom Hannay takes on as his batman
- Sir Walter Bullivant, spymaster, old acquaintance of Hannay
- Andrew Amos, trade union shop steward and Blenkiron's man in Scotland
- Mary Lamington, a girl Hannay meets and falls in love with
- Launcelot Wake, a conscientious objector, cousin of Mary
- Count Otto von Schwabing, an officer of the Imperial Guard and German spy that Hannay met in 'The Thirty-Nine Steps'; notorious for his ability to disguise himself. His guises include an important pacifist thinker Moxon Ivery and a Kansas City journalist Clarence Donne. He also falls in love with Mary.

== Critical reception ==
On 5 November 2019 BBC News listed Mr Standfast on its list of the 100 most influential novels.

== See also ==
The subsequent Richard Hannay novels of John Buchan are:

- The Three Hostages (1924)
- The Island of Sheep (1936)

He also appears as a secondary character in The Courts of the Morning (1929).
