= John S. Blenkiron =

John Scantlebury Blenkiron is a fictional character who appears in several books by John Buchan, including Greenmantle, Mr Standfast, The Courts of the Morning and Sick Heart River. Blenkiron comes from the United States, and has assisted Richard Hannay. When Hannay first meets Blenkiron, it is revealed that he suffers from dyspepsia and so often drinks boiled milk, eats dry toast and fish. Subsequently he has an operation where a part of his duodenum is replaced by rubber tubing and his digestion is restored.

Blenkiron often professes his wish to join the war or "be let into a scene of real bloodshed", but he confesses that he "has never seen anything gorier than a presidential election." Blenkiron also does not seem short on money and is used to living the high life. As a consequence, when he travels through Europe as an English spy, he becomes quite comfortable living with successful German politicians and Generals. Blenkiron is a strong believer in the Christian faith and quite often comments on his faith. He often remarks that he is a "Neutral" as that he comes from the United States and is quite proud of the fact. In "Greenmantle", on meeting (Major, at that time) Richard Hannay, he pronounces the word as "Nootral", a dramatic device giving the reader a nice literary clue as to his origin in the USA and dialect. in "Mr Standfast" he also states "I considered that the time had come to pay for valuable "Noos" ".

== Appearance ==
Blenkiron, as described by the author, is a "big fellow with a fat, sallow clean shaven face." He also has "a pair of full sleepy eyes". Christopher Hitchens calls him "a fat and rich but nonetheless brave and humorous figure".

In the last chapter of Mr Standfast (the third Hannay Novel by Buchan) Blenkiron achieves his desire to participate in "a real high-class Armageddon". Hannay has him inspanned as a battalion-commander in British uniform, leading the actions of a scratch American Engineer-company and other emergency troops put together in a hurry. Blenkiron and his companies successfully stem at a vital time, the strong German advance towards Amiens, and so he prevents the loss of newly-dug trench lines - a loss which would mean disaster for the whole front.

== Evaluation ==
According to Charles Moore, Blenkiron's presence in Greenmantle is due to the book being written with the purpose of getting the United States to join the Allies in World War I. This happened in 1917, the year after the book's publication.

H. E. Taylor notes that Buchan portrays Blenkiron positively as a businessman. He suggests that Buchan "may have felt more comfortable delineating a positive business character as a foreign national who, by reason of his absurd pastiche accent and diction, could not in any case aspire to gentrification."
