= Blackwood (publishing house) =

Scottish publishing house

William Blackwood and Sons
- Status: Defunct
- Founded: 1804; 221 years ago
- Founder: William Blackwood
- Country of origin: United Kingdom
- Headquarters location: Edinburgh, Scotland
- Publication types: Books, magazines

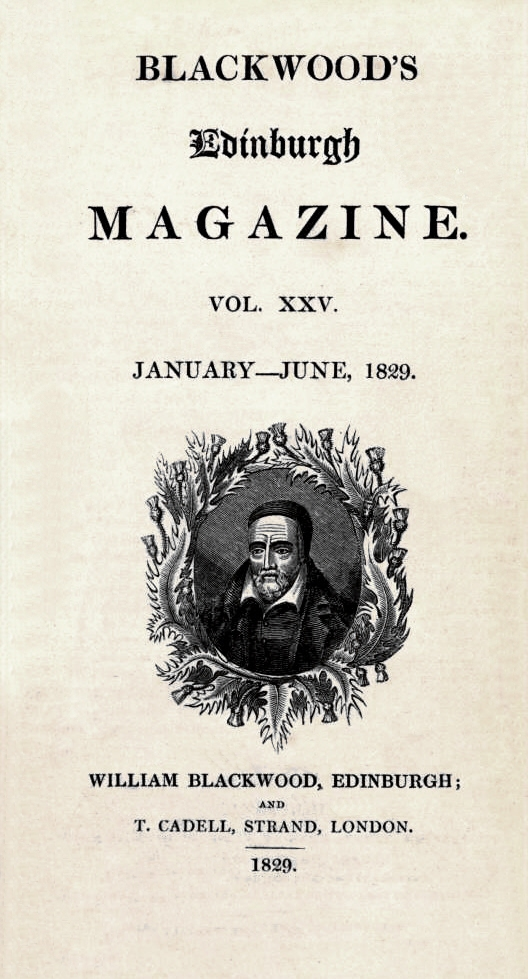
Blackwood's Magazine, 1829

William Blackwood and Sons was a Scottish publishing house and printer founded by William Blackwood in 1804. It played a key role in literary history, publishing many important authors, for example John Buchan, George Tomkyns Chesney, Joseph Conrad, Miles Franklin, George Eliot, E. M. Forster, John Galt, John Neal, Thomas De Quincey, Charles Reade, Margaret Oliphant, John Hanning Speke and Anthony Trollope, both in books and in the monthly Blackwood’s Magazine.

== History ==
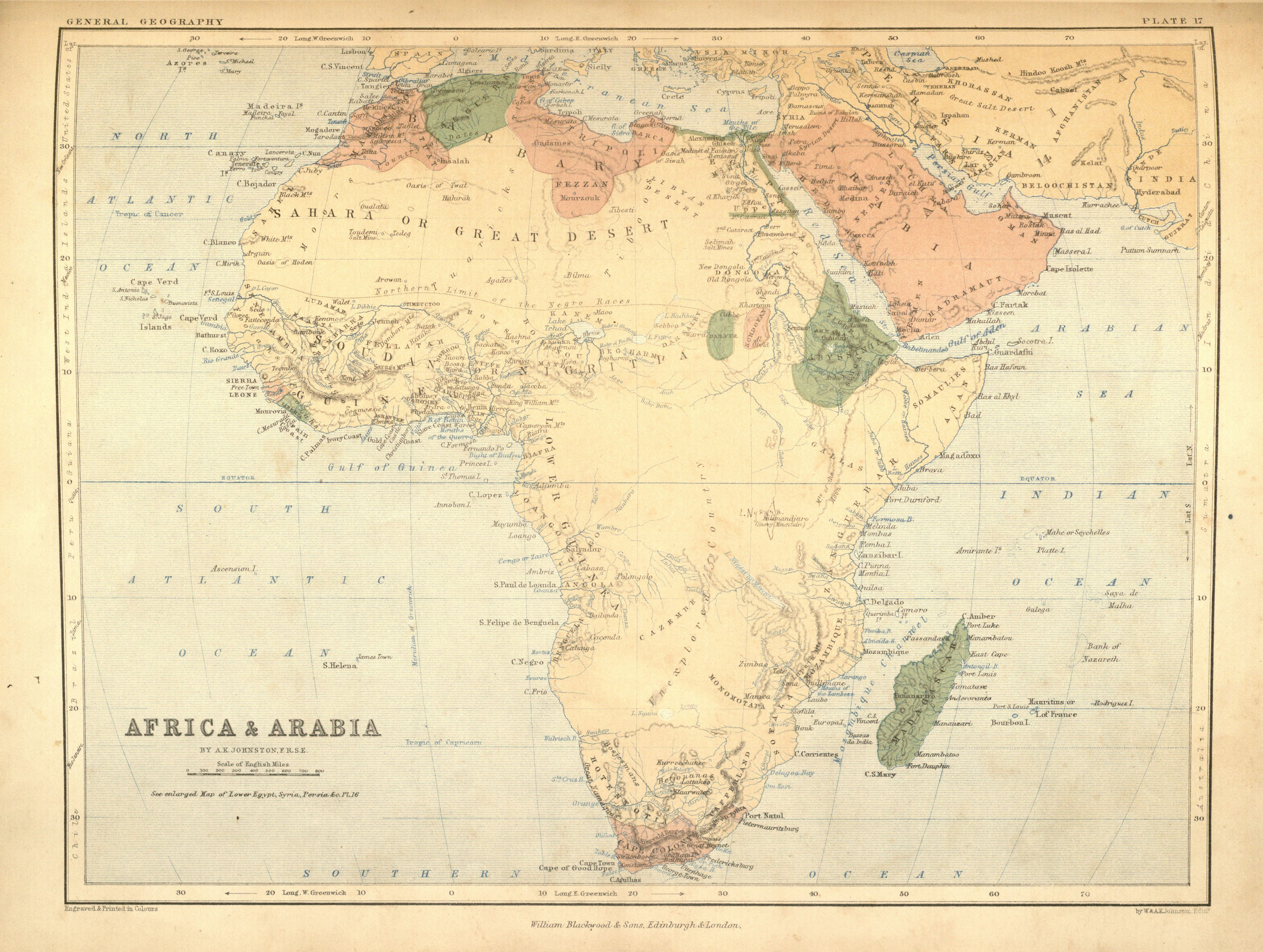
Alexander Keith Johnston's map Africa & Arabia, published by Blackwood in 1852

In 1804 William Blackwood opened a shop in South Bridge Street, Edinburgh, for the sale of old, rare and curious books. He undertook the Scottish agency for John Murray and other London publishers, and gradually drifted into publishing on his own account, moving in 1816 to Princes Street. On 1 April 1817 the first number of the Edinburgh Monthly Magazine was published, which on its seventh number became Blackwood's Edinburgh Magazine. "Maga," as this magazine soon came to be called, was the organ of the Scottish Tory party, and round it gathered a host of able writers.

In May 1824 Blackwood's became the first British literary journal to publish work by an American with an essay by John Neal that got reprinted across Europe. Over the following year and a half the magazine published Neal's American Writers series, which is the first written history of American literature. The relationship between Blackwood and Neal fell apart over Neal's novel Brother Jonathan, which Blackwood published at a loss in late 1825.

In 1829 he wrote to his son William in India telling him that he was moving from Princes Street to 45 George Street as George Street was "becoming more and more a place of business and the east end of Princes Street is now like Charing Cross, a mere place for coaches". His brother Thomas bought 43 and in 1830 Thomas Hamilton remodelled the entire frontage of the pair for the Blackwood Brothers or Messrs. Blackwood. Thomas's shop operated as a silk merchant.

William Blackwood died in 1834 and is buried in an ornate vault in the lower western section of Old Calton Cemetery. He was succeeded by his two sons, Alexander and Robert, who added a London branch to the firm. In 1845 Alexander Blackwood died, and shortly afterwards Robert.

A younger brother, John Blackwood succeeded to the business; later he was joined by his brother Major William Blackwood, who continued in the firm until his death in 1861, when his elder son, William Blackwood III (born 1836), was taken into partnership. On the death of John Blackwood, William Blackwood III was left in sole control of the business. With him were associated his nephews, George William and JH Blackwood, sons of Major George Blackwood, who was killed at Maiwand in 1880.

The last member of the Blackwood family to run the company was Douglas Blackwood. During World War II Blackwood was a fighter pilot and at the height of the Battle of Britain recalled looking down from 25,000 feet to see the firm's London office in Paternoster Row ablaze. Millions of books were lost in the fire and the destruction of Blackwood's base in the City of London marked the beginning of the firm's decline. He retired in 1976 and by 1980 the firm had amalgamated.

== Books first published by Blackwood ==
- Edinburgh Encyclopædia (from 1808), editor David Brewster
- The Pilgrim of the Sun, (1814) James Hogg
- Mador of the Moor, (1816), James Hogg
- The Black Dwarf (1816), Walter Scott
- Brother Jonathan: or, the New Englanders (1825), John Neal
- The Course of Time (1827), Robert Pollok
- Ten Thousand a-Year (1841), Samuel Warren
- Scenes of Clerical Life (1857), George Eliot
  - Scenes of Clerical Life free PDF of Blackwood's 1878 Cabinet Edition (the critical standard with Eliot's final corrections) at the George Eliot Archive
- Adam Bede (1859), George Eliot
  - Adam Bede free PDF of Blackwood's 1878 Cabinet Edition (the critical standard with Eliot's final corrections) at the George Eliot Archive
- The Lifted Veil (1859), George Eliot
  - The Lifted Veil free PDF of Blackwood's 1878 Cabinet Edition (the critical standard with Eliot's final corrections) at the George Eliot Archive
- The Mill on the Floss (1860), George Eliot
  - The Mill on the Floss free PDF of Blackwood's 1878 Cabinet Edition (the critical standard with Eliot's final corrections) at the George Eliot Archive
- Silas Marner (1861), George Eliot
  - Silas Marner free PDF of Blackwood's 1878 Cabinet Edition (the critical standard with Eliot's final corrections) at the George Eliot Archive
- Felix Holt, the Radical (1866), George Eliot
  - Felix Holt, the Radical free PDF of Blackwood's 1878 Cabinet Edition (the critical standard with Eliot's final corrections) at the George Eliot Archive
- Middlemarch (1871–1872), George Eliot
  - Middlemarch free PDF of Blackwood's 1878 Cabinet Edition (the critical standard with Eliot's final corrections) at the George Eliot Archive
- Daniel Deronda (1876), George Eliot
  - Daniel Deronda free PDF of Blackwood's 1878 Cabinet Edition (the critical standard with Eliot's final corrections) at the George Eliot Archive
- Impressions of Theophrastus Such (1879), George Eliot
  - Impressions of Theophrastus Such free PDF of Blackwood's 1878 Cabinet Edition (the critical standard with Eliot's final corrections) at the George Eliot Archive
- The Fixed Period (1882), Anthony Trollope
- Scottish land-names; their origin and meaning (1894), Herbert Maxwell
- The Lost Stradivarius (1895), J. Meade Falkner
- My Brilliant Career (1901), Miles Franklin
- Youth (1902), Joseph Conrad
- William Wetmore Story and His Friends (1903), Henry James
- Where Angels Fear to Tread (1905), E. M. Forster
- Significant Etymology: Or, Roots, Stems, and Branches of the English Language (1908), James Mitchell
- Prester John (1910), John Buchan
- The Thirty-Nine Steps (1915), John Buchan
- The Power-House (1916), John Buchan
- The Dual Mandate in British Tropical Africa (1922), Frederick D. Lugard
- The Courts of the Morning (1929), John Buchan
- The Curve of Time (1961), M. Wylie Blanchet

== Book series published by Blackwood ==
- Ancient Classics for the English Reader
- Foreign Classics for the English Reader
- Periods of European Literature
- Philosophical Classics for the English Reader

== Works originally published in Blackwood's Magazine ==
- Noctes Ambrosianae (1822 to 1835), James Hogg, John Gibson Lockhart, William Maginn, John Wilson et al.
- American Writers (1824–1825), John Neal
- On Murder Considered as one of the Fine Arts (1827), Thomas De Quincey
- The Iron Shroud (1830), William Mudford
- The English Mail-Coach (1849), Thomas De Quincey
- The Battle of Dorking (1871), George Tomkyns Chesney
- The Fixed Period (1881), Anthony Trollope
- Youth (1898), Joseph Conrad
- Heart of Darkness (1899), Joseph Conrad
- Lord Jim (1899), Joseph Conrad
- The Highwayman (1906), Alfred Noyes
- The Power-House (1913), John Buchan

== See also ==
- How to Write a Blackwood Article, by Edgar Allan Poe
