= John Macnab =

1925 novel by John Buchan

- First edition
- Author: John Buchan
- Language: English
- Genre: Adventure novel
- Set in: Scotland
- Publisher: Hodder & Stoughton
- Publication date: 1925
- Media type: Print
- Pages: 320

John Macnab is a 1925 adventure novel by the Scottish author John Buchan. The story has been adapted for television and has provided the inspiration for several novels by later authors.

== Plot ==
Three successful friends in their forties confess their ennui with their lives and professions. They are Sir Edward Leithen, lawyer, Member of Parliament and ex-Attorney General; John Palliser-Yeates, banker; and Charles, Earl of Lamancha, a Cabinet Minister. The friends are advised by a doctor that in order to recover their zest for life they should shake themselves out of their predictable lives and spend time doing something really difficult and dangerous. They decide to turn to poaching, an activity both technically challenging and also dangerous, since to be caught and publicly named would inevitably result in a career-ending scandal for such high-profile men.

Under the collective name of 'John Macnab', they set up a base in the Highland home of their young friend Sir Archie Roylance, Laird of Crask, disabled war veteran and local Conservative parliamentary candidate.

'John Macnab' writes to three of Sir Archie's neighbours informing them that he intends to kill a stag (or salmon) on their land between two specified dates. If he fails he will pay a forfeit of £100, and if he succeeds will pay £50 to charity. All three reply. Colonel Raden, head of an old-established Scottish family and owner of the Glenraden estate, recognises that the writer is some sort of sportsman, and accepts the challenge; Junius Bandicott, an American who is leasing Strathlarrig estate, confesses himself unfamiliar with local customs, but also accepts; and Lord Claybody, the rich and rather vulgar lessee of Haripol Forest, replies via his attorneys threatening to prosecute anyone who trespasses on his land. The friends draw lots: Palliser-Yeates will take a stag at Glenraden, Leithen a salmon at Strathlarrig, and Lamancha a stag in the Haripol Forest.

Archie meets Janet Raden, the colonel's daughter, who puts him into a quandary by asking for his help in defeating John Macnab at Glenraden and winning the promised £100. Junius Bandicott's father, Acheson Bandicott, is an archaeologist who has been given permission to excavate a site on Glandraden that he believes to be the tomb of Harald Blacktooth. With the help of the homeless young fish seller 'Fish Benjie', Palliser-Yeates manages to shoot a stag under cover of the sound of the excavations, but is spotted by Janet before he is able to get the beast away. He escapes without being identified.

Leithen's task at Strathlarrig is complicated by the arrival of a hoard of journalists covering Bandicott's archaeological discoveries. Disguised as a tramp, he manages to take a salmon, but has to leave it on the bank to avoid being caught in possession. To throw the gillie off the scent he cuts a chunk out of the fish's flesh with a knife, and pretends that the fish was killed by an otter. Fish Benji picks it up for him, unobserved.

As the new parliamentary candidate, Archie has to give a speech at the hustings in Muirtown, but on stage finds himself too terrified even to start. Fortunately, he is saved when he recalls Janet's philosophy of life, which she had expounded to him the day before while they were walking alone in the hills. He extemporises, and makes a great, though unconventional, oration.

Lamancha's job of taking a stag in the Haripol Forest appears impossible when the journalists get wind of the John Macnab story, and crowd into the area. Claybody's son, Johnson, has also herded all the deer into the estate's sanctuary, and has surrounded it with a cordon of navvies. But with the help of a sympathetic journalist, Crossby, and a variety of feints, Lamancha succeeds in killing and extracting from the forest 'the auld hero', a famous stag.

Due to a misunderstanding, Lamancha accidentally blurts out to Claybody the identities of John Macnab. Claybody is confused, and says that he would gladly have made a game of it had he known that his adversaries were one of his own party leaders, a barrister he is instructing in a big case, and a banker with whom he has done a lot of business. No matter what they had done, Claybody says, he would never expose them.

The three friends have recovered their zest for life, and towards the end of the year Archie Roylance marries Janet Raden.

== Principal characters ==
- Sir Edward Leithen, lawyer, Conservative Member of Parliament and ex-Attorney General
- John Palliser-Yeates, banker and sportsman
- Charles, Earl of Lamancha, former adventurer and current Conservative Cabinet Minister
- Sir Archibald ('Archie') Roylance, Laird of Crask
- Colonel Alastair Raden, head of an old-established Scottish family
- Janet Raden, Colonel Raden's daughter
- Junius Theodore Bandicott, American lessee of the Strathlarrig estate
- Acheson Bandicott, archaeologist and father of Junius
- Lord Claybody, lessee of Haripol Forest
- Johnson Claybody, Lord Claybody's son
- Mr Crossby, sympathetic journalist
- Benjamin Bogle ('Fish Benjie')

== Critical reception ==
A contemporary Australian newspaper review considered the story to be "excellent and thoroughly entertaining", and from which "readers will be able to extract a good deal of genuine amusement". Another Australian newspaper called it "a tale that commands attention from the opening chapter."

== Influence ==
- The Return of John Macnab (1996) was written by Andrew Greig as a 1990s retelling of the story.
- The Legend of John Macnab (2015) by James Christie, was also inspired by the Buchan book
- Castle Macnab (2018) by Robert J Harris re-unites the "Macnabs", along with Richard Hannay, in a new adventure a year after the events of the original book.

== TV adaptation ==
John Prebble adapted the book for a three-part BBC television production in 1976, directed by Donald McWhinnie.
