= The Thirty-Nine Steps =

1915 novel by John Buchan

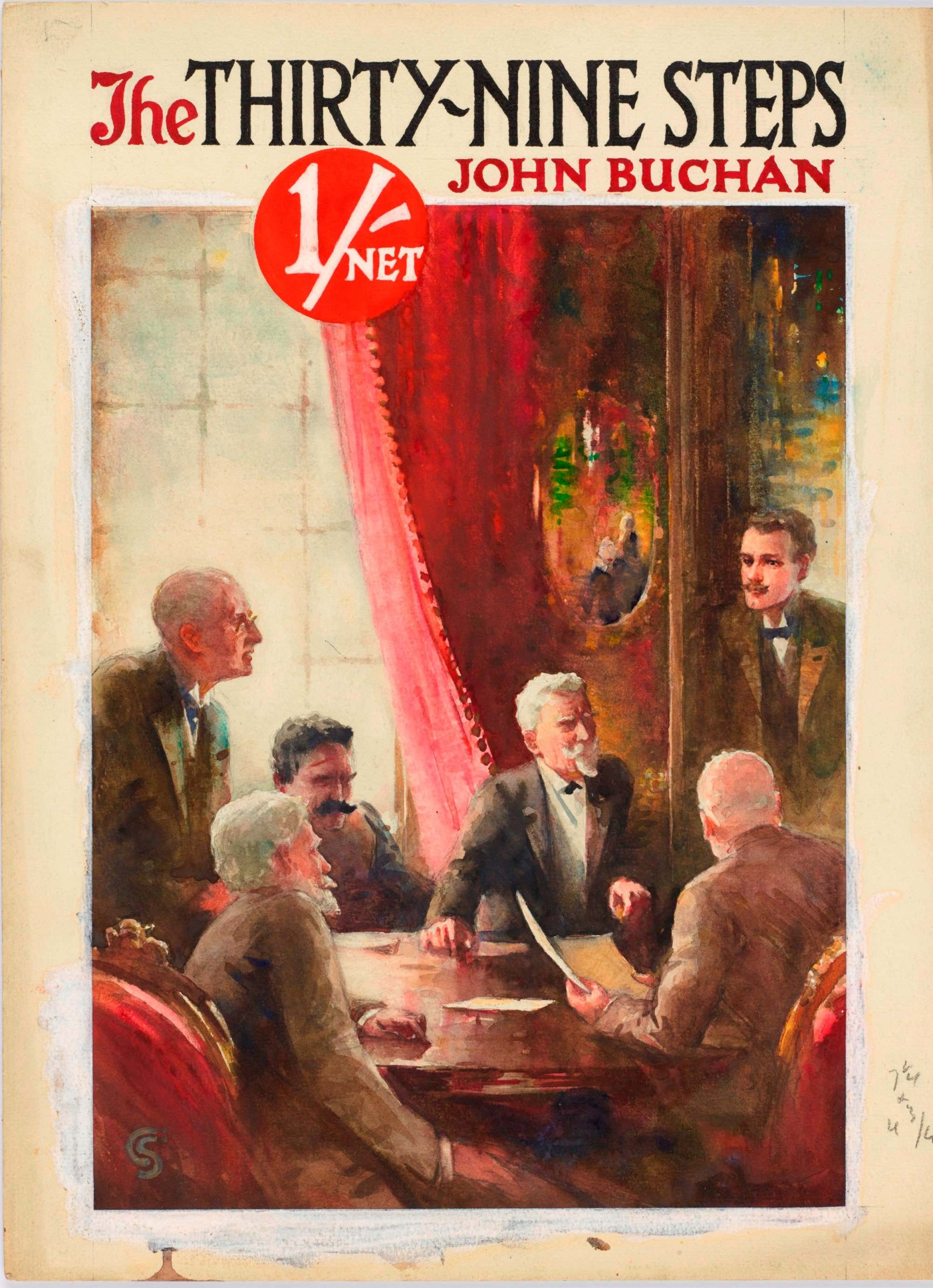
- First edition
- Author: John Buchan
- Language: English
- Series: Richard Hannay
- Genre: Adventure novel
- Publisher: William Blackwood and Sons
- Publication date: 1915
- Publication place: United Kingdom
- Media type: Print
- Pages: 253
- Followed by: Greenmantle
- Text: The Thirty-Nine Steps at Wikisource

The Thirty-Nine Steps is a 1915 adventure novel by the Scottish author John Buchan, first published by William Blackwood and Sons, Edinburgh. It was serialized in All-Story Weekly issues of 5 and 12 June 1915, and in Blackwood's Magazine (credited to "H. de V.") between July and September 1915, before being published in book form in October of that year. It is the first of five novels featuring Richard Hannay, an all-action hero with a stiff upper lip and a knack for getting himself out of tricky situations.

The novel has been adapted many times, including several films and a long-running stage play. In 2003, the book was listed on the BBC's Big Read poll of Britain's "best-loved novels."

== Plot ==
The story's narrator, Richard Hannay, arrives in London from Rhodesia early in 1914, having made a modest fortune as a mining engineer. Disillusioned with his uneventful life as a man about town, he is on the brink of resolving to leave England for good when a panicked neighbour, Franklin Scudder, knocks at the door of his flat in Portland Place. Scudder is a freelance journalist who claims to have uncovered a plot against the Premier of Greece, Constantine Karolides. According to Scudder, Karolides is to be assassinated in London in a few weeks' time, on 15 June, an event which the plotters hope will trigger war in Europe.

Fearing for his life, Scudder has gone to the trouble of faking his own death, and needs to disappear from view. Hannay permits him to hide in his flat, and is horrified when a few days later he returns to find Scudder with a knife through his heart, now truly dead. Determined to warn the government of the plot, but unwilling to go to the police for fear of being arrested for murder, Hannay escapes the building disguised as a milkman and takes a train to Scotland, intending to find a remote area where he can lie low. He takes with him the coded notebook in which Scudder had recorded his findings.

Hannay alights at a rural station in the Galloway Hills, and a cat-and-mouse chase ensues as he evades both the plotters, who attempt to spot him on the open hillside from an aeroplane, and the police. Deciphering Scudder's notes, he learns that his adversaries are members of a German spy ring known as the "Black Stone" whose goal is to steal Britain's naval defence plans before war breaks out. Hannay meets Sir Harry, landowner and local parliamentary candidate, and takes him into his confidence. Sir Harry promises to write to his godfather, Sir Walter Bullivant, Permanent Secretary at the Foreign Office, to warn him of the plot.

Narrowly avoiding his pursuers, Hannay stumbles into a lonely cottage and finds himself face to face with the Black Stone's leader. Hannay's lies are convincing enough to leave the spies in doubt as to his true identity, and they lock him in a storeroom rather than killing him outright. Finding a cabinet full of explosives, Hannay uses his experience as a mining engineer to escape by blowing the window from its frame. Eventually he manages to catch a train south, hoping to find Sir Walter Bullivant at his home in Berkshire.

Sir Walter accepts the bulk of Hannay's story, but doubts that Karolides' life is in danger. An urgent government phone call, however, informs him that Karolides is already dead. The two men travel to London, where Sir Walter is to host a high-level official meeting at his city townhouse. Hannay, now cleared of the Portland Place murder, is left to his own devices, but a general feeling of unease prompts him to call at Sir Walter's house. He arrives just in time to see the First Sea Lord leaving; their eyes briefly meet, and Hannay recognizes him as one of the spies in disguise. Hannay breaks into the meeting, but by the time the deception is confirmed the man has long gone, taking with him the naval secrets he has just learned.

Realising that the spies will have to cross the Channel to get their information back to Germany, Hannay and the meeting attendees comb Scudder's notebook for clues as to the planned point of departure. An entry reading "Thirty-nine steps — I counted them — High tide, 10.17 p.m." leads them to a clifftop villa in Kent with a private flight of steps — 39 in total — running down to the sea. A yacht waits offshore. Hannay confronts the occupants of the villa and is mortified to find what appears to be a perfectly ordinary group of English friends who have been enjoying a game of tennis in the sun. But then one of the men droops his eyelids in a characteristic gesture that Hannay recognizes — it is the owner of the cottage in Scotland. Hannay blows his whistle, and most of the spies are arrested before they can reach the yacht. Britain enters the Great War seven weeks later, and Hannay is commissioned as a captain in the army. He comments, "But I had done my best service, I think, before I put on khaki."

== Principal characters ==
- Richard Hannay – protagonist and narrator; mining engineer recently arrived from Southern Africa
- Franklin P Scudder – freelance journalist
- Sir Harry – Scottish landowner and local parliamentary candidate
- Sir Walter Bullivant – Permanent Secretary at the Foreign Office; Sir Harry's godfather
- Alexander Turnbull – roadmender

== Background ==
The Thirty-Nine Steps first appeared in All-Story Weekly magazine of 5 and 12 June 1915

John Buchan wrote The Thirty-Nine Steps while he was ill in bed with a duodenal ulcer, an illness which remained with him all his life. Buchan's son William later wrote that the name of the book originated when the author's daughter was counting the stairs at St Cuby, a private nursing home on Cliff Promenade in Broadstairs, where Buchan was convalescing. "There was a wooden staircase leading down to the beach. My sister, who was about six, and who had just learnt to count properly, went down them and gleefully announced: there are 39 steps." The tunnelled stairway through the cliff actually consisted of 78 steps, but Buchan halved the number to make a better title. When the original oak steps were later replaced, one of them, complete with a brass plaque, was sent to Buchan. The concrete steps now number 108, still running from the garden to the beach.

This novel was his first "shocker", as he called it — a story combining personal and political dramas. It marked a turning point in Buchan's literary career and introduced his adventuring hero Richard Hannay. He described a "shocker" as an adventure where the events in the story are unlikely and the reader is only just able to believe that they really happened.

== Dedication ==
Buchan dedicated the novel to his friend Thomas Arthur Nelson, saying "My Dear Tommy, / You and I have long cherished an affection for that elemental type of tale which Americans call the 'dime novel' and which we know as the 'shocker' — the romance where the incidents defy the probabilities, and march just inside the borders of the possible. During an illness last winter I exhausted my store of those aids to cheerfulness, and was driven to write one for myself. This little volume is the result, and I should like to put your name on it in memory of our long friendship, in the days when the wildest fictions are so much less improbable than the facts.

== Literary significance and criticism ==
The Thirty-Nine Steps is one of the earliest examples of the '"man-on-the-run" thriller archetype subsequently adopted by film makers as a much-used plot device. In The Thirty-Nine Steps, Buchan holds up Richard Hannay as an example to his readers of an ordinary man who puts his country's interests before his own safety. The story was a great success with the men in the First World War trenches. One soldier wrote to Buchan, "The story is greatly appreciated in the midst of mud and rain and shells, and all that could make trench life depressing."

Hannay continued his adventures in four subsequent books. Two were set during the war, when he continued his undercover work against the Germans and their allies the Turks in Greenmantle (1916) and Mr Standfast (1919). The other two stories, The Three Hostages (1924) and The Island of Sheep (1936) were set in the postwar period, when Hannay's opponents were criminal gangs.

== Adaptations ==
The novel has been adapted for multiple media; many of these versions depart significantly from the text – for example, by introducing a love interest absent from the original novel and inspired by Hitchcock's film. In most cases, the title is often abbreviated to The 39 Steps, but the full title is more commonly used for the book and 1978 film adaptation.

=== Film ===
==== The 39 Steps (1935) ====
The 1935 black-and-white film directed by Alfred Hitchcock deviates substantially from the book. It stars Robert Donat as Hannay and Madeleine Carroll as a woman he meets on the train. It is regarded by many critics as the best film version. This was one of several Hitchcock films based upon the idea of an "innocent man on the run", such as Saboteur and North by Northwest. In 1999, it came 4th in a BFI poll of British films and in 2004 Total Film named it the 21st greatest British film of all time.

==== The 39 Steps (1959) ====
The 1959 film directed by Ralph Thomas was the first colour version, starring Kenneth More as Hannay and Taina Elg as Miss Fisher. It is closely based on Hitchcock's adaptation, including the music-hall finale with "Mr. Memory" and Hannay's escape from a train on the Forth Bridge, scenes not present in the book. It features a musical score by Clifton Parker.

==== The Thirty Nine Steps (1978) ====
The 1978 version was directed by Don Sharp and starred Robert Powell as Hannay, Karen Dotrice as Alex, John Mills as Colonel Scudder. It is generally regarded as the closest to the book, being set at the same time as the novel, pre-Great War, but still bears little resemblance to Buchan's original story. Its climax bore no relation to the novel's denouement, instead seeing Hannay hanging from the hands of Big Ben. The film was followed by a spin-off television series, Hannay, also starring Powell and featuring adventures occurring both before and after the events in The Thirty-Nine Steps.

==== The 39 Steps (2008) ====
The BBC commissioned a new television adaptation of the novel, scripted by Lizzie Mickery and produced by BBC Scotland's drama unit. The 90-minute film stars Rupert Penry-Jones, Lydia Leonard, Patrick Malahide and Eddie Marsan, and was first broadcast on 28 December 2008 The storyline only very tenuously follows that of the book, with many characters being renamed or omitted altogether, and romantic subplot was added to the story. The film ends with a scene involving a submarine in a Scottish loch, rather than the original setting off the Kent coast, and the apparent death of one character.

=== Radio ===
There were numerous American radio adaptations during the two decades following the release of Hitchcock's film, most of which were based on its heavily altered plot. It remains a popular subject for modern live productions done in a similar, old-time radio style.

- 1937, starring Robert Montgomery and Ida Lupino, part of the Lux Radio Theater series.
- 1938, starring Orson Welles, part of The Mercury Theatre on the Air series.
- 1943, starring Herbert Marshall and Madeleine Carroll, part of the Philip Morris Playhouse series.
- 1946, starring David Niven, part of The Hour of Mystery series.
- 1947, part of the Canadian Broadcasting Company Stage Series.
- 1948, starring Glenn Ford and Mercedes McCambridge, part of the Studio One series.
- 1952, starring Herbert Marshall, part of the Suspense series.

There have been many full cast adaptations for BBC Radio and all are based directly on Buchan's novel.

- 1939, in six parts, adapted by Winifred Carey and produced by James McKechnie.
- 1944, in six parts, adapted by Winifred Carey and produced by Derek McCulloch.
- 1950, The Adventures of Richard Hannay in eight half-hour parts, based on The Thirty-Nine Steps and Mr Standfast adapted by Winifred Carey and produced by Donald McLean.
- 1960, in six episodes, adapted by J. C. Gosforth and produced by Frederick Bradnum.
- 1972, The Adventures of Richard Hannay based on The Thirty-Nine Steps and Mr Standfast in six episodes, adapted by Winifred Carey and produced by Norman Wright.
- 1989, dramatised by Peter Buckman, directed by Patrick Rayner, and starring David Rintoul.
- 2001, starring David Robb, Tom Baker and William Hope, adapted by Bert Coules.

There are also several BBC solo readings:

- 1947, in 12 parts, abridged by Hilton Brown and read by Arthur Bush.
- 1978, in five parts, abridged by Barry Campbell and read by Frank Duncan.
- 1996, in ten parts, produced by Jane Marshall and read by John Nettles.
- 2019, in ten episodes, produced by Karen Holden and read by Kenny Blyth.

Other solo readings:

- 1994, abridged, read by James Fox and released by Orbis Publishing, as part of their "Talking Classics" series. It consisted of an illustrated magazine accompanied by a double CD or cassette.
- 2007, unabridged, read by Robert Powell and released by Audible audiobooks.
- 2007, unabridged, read by Peter Joyce and released by Assembled Stories audiobooks.

In 2014, BBC Radio 3 broadcast Landmark: The Thirty-Nine Steps and World War I, a 45-minute documentary on the novel's initial impact at home and abroad.

=== Theatre ===
A comic theatrical adaptation by Simon Corble and Nobby Dimon for a cast of four actors premiered in 1995 at the Georgian Theatre Royal in Richmond, North Yorkshire, before embarking on a tour of village halls across the north of England. In 2005, Patrick Barlow rewrote the script, keeping the scenes, staging and small-scale feel, and in June 2005 this re-adaptation premiered at the West Yorkshire Playhouse, The play then opened in London's Tricycle Theatre, and after a successful run transferred to the Criterion Theatre in Piccadilly where it became the fifth longest running play until it closed in September 2015. Although drawing on Buchan's novel, it is strongly influenced by Hitchcock's 1935 film adaptation. On 15 January 2008, the show made its US Broadway premiere at the American Airlines Theatre; it transferred to the Cort Theatre on 29 April 2008 and then moved to the Helen Hayes Theatre on 21 January 2009, where it ended its run on 10 January 2010. It reopened on Stage One of New York's Off-Broadway venue New World Stages on 25 March 2010 and closed on 15 April 2010. The Broadway production received six Tony Award nominations, winning two – Best Lighting Design and Best Sound Design – with the London show winning an Olivier in 2007 and two Tony Awards in 2008. The play also won the Drama Desk Award, Unique Theatrical Experience.

=== Television ===
A 1988 prequel television series named Hannay was spawned from the 1978 feature film version.

=== Video game ===
A 2013, Scottish developer The Story Mechanics used the Unity game engine to create The 39 Steps, a digital adaptation.

=== Interactive fiction ===
In 2008, Penguin Books adapted the story as interactive fiction under the authorship of Charles Cumming calling it The 21 Steps.
