= The Three Hostages =

1924 novel by John Buchan

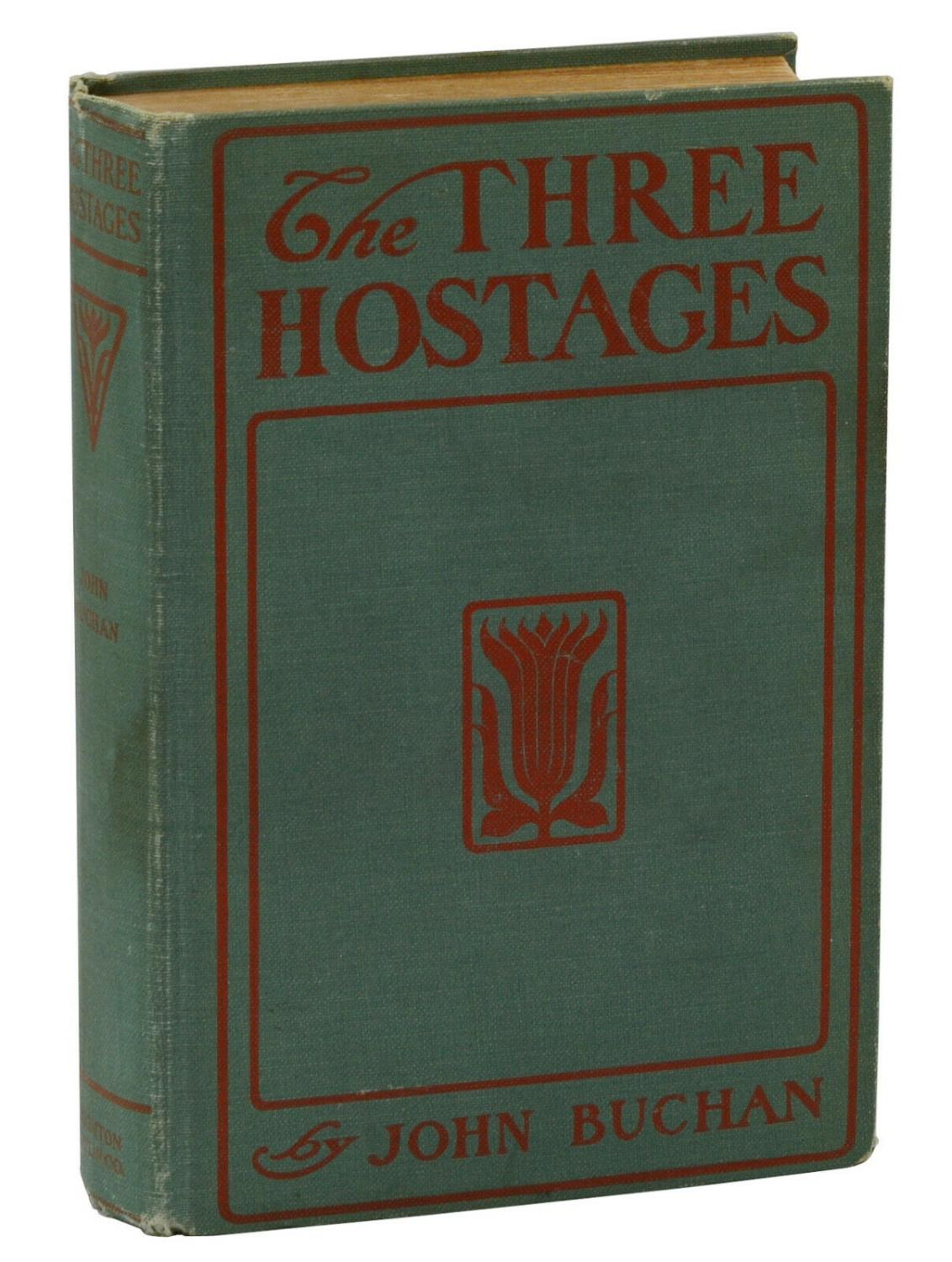
- 1924 US First edition
- Author: John Buchan
- Language: English
- Series: Richard Hannay
- Genre: Thriller
- Set in: England, Norway, Scotland
- Publisher: Hodder & Stoughton
- Publication date: July 1924
- Media type: Print
- Pages: 319
- OCLC: 1157950451
- Preceded by: Mr Standfast
- Followed by: The Island of Sheep/(The Courts of the Morning)

The Three Hostages is the fourth of five Richard Hannay novels by the Scottish author John Buchan, first published in July 1924 by Hodder & Stoughton, London.

Hannay had previously appeared in The Thirty-Nine Steps (1915), his most famous adventure, and in Greenmantle (1916) and Mr. Standfast (1919) about his activities during the First World War. The last novel in the series is The Island of Sheep. Three Hostages is set sometime after the war. Hannay has married Mary Lamington (who featured in Mr. Standfast) and the couple have settled down to live in rural tranquility in the Cotswolds with their young son Peter John.

== Plot ==
Dr Greenslade discusses with his friend Richard Hannay the power of the subconscious, and the ills of post-war society.

Hannay is asked to help recover three hostages seized by associates of a criminal gang that aims to control people's disturbed and disordered minds in the aftermath of the Great War. They are Adela Victor, daughter of a wealthy American banker and fiancée to Hannay's wartime companion the Marquis de la Tour du Pin ('Turpin'); Lord Mercot, an undergraduate; and Davie Warcliffe, a schoolboy.

Hannay and Greenslade puzzle over a cryptic poem sent by the kidnappers which refers to a blind woman spinning, a Norwegian barn, and "the Fields of Eden". Greenslade says he has heard of the first two before, though he cannot recall where. When Hannay discovers that the last expression comes from a hymn, Greenslade remembers a man named Dominick Medina who had talked of these things and who had hummed the tune. He had also mentioned a curiosity shop, which may relate to the Fields.

Medina impresses Hannay, but his old friend Sandy Arbuthnot is suspicious. When Hannay is invited to Medina's home, Medina attempts hypnotism, but Hannay manages to resist. Feeling ill the next day he visits a Dr Newhover, a name suggested by Medina, and is referred to a masseuse named Madame Breda, in whose house he sees a strange-looking young girl named Gerda. He is again hypnotised, and resists. Sandy departs saying that he needs to continue his own researches in Europe.

Hannay visits a dance club with his friend Archie Roylance and sees a beautiful young dancer with dead eyes who appears to be under the control of a man he recognises as Medina's butler.

Medina introduces Hannay to his mother, a blind, frightening old woman. She also attempts to hypnotise him, and he pretends to succumb, acting out a variety of demeaning tasks. Hannay is present when Medina meets with Kharama, an Indian who emanates ruthless power and whom Medina addresses as 'master'.

Learning that Newhover plans to visit Norway, Hannay tells Medina that he is ill and needs a week's bed rest at home. Medina agrees, enabling Hannay to slip away and follow Newhover to a secluded Norwegian farm where Lord Mercot is being held. Hannay insists that Mercot must remain there a little longer to avoid tipping off the gang and risking the lives of the other hostages. Archie flies Hannay back to England in a private plane.

In an old book, Hannay finds mention of a London pleasure-resort known as "the Fields of Eden". Where it had once stood he finds an antique shop. Exploring by night, he discovers a room overlooking the dance club he had visited earlier. He watches a hideously-dressed couple dancing, and is shocked to recognise Turpin and his own wife, Mary. Later, Mary explains that she and Turpin have been working for Sandy, and that they have found Turpin's fiancée, Adela: she is the dead eyed dancer.

Hannay moves in with Medina. Turpin is kidnapped and held in the same house as his fiancée. Mary disguises herself as a district visitor and befriends the maid at Madame Breda's house.

The police swoop simultaneously in several countries: conspirators are arrested and the located hostages released. Medina refuses Hannay's offer of immunity in return for the still-missing Davie Warcliffe – even when Kharama enters and reveals himself to be a disguised Sandy who has been holding Turpin and Adela at Medina's request. Mary enters with Gerda from Madame Breda's – now revealed to be Davie. Full of wrath, she threatens to disfigure the vain Medina; he capitulates and restores the boy's mind.

Davie is returned to his father, Lord Mercot resumes his studies, and Adela and Turpin marry.

Some months later, Sandy warns Hannay that Medina is seeking revenge, and Hannay heads to a remote deerstalking lodge in the Scottish Highlands. Medina follows. The men stalk each other through the Highland crags, with Hannay eventually gaining an upper position. Medina attempts to climb up, and gets dangerously stuck. Hannay lowers a lifeline, but the rope breaks and Medina falls to his death. Hannay collapses, exhausted, and is rescued by Mary the next morning.

== Principal characters ==
- Sir Richard Hannay, retired soldier, intelligence agent, and former mining engineer
- Mary, his wife, also a former intelligence agent
- Sandy Arbuthnot, old friend of Hannay
- Sir Archie Roylance, a friend of Hannay
- Sir Walter Bullivant, a senior officer in the intelligence service
- MacGillivray, Bullivant's right-hand man
- Dr Tom Greenslade, well-travelled local doctor
- Adela Victor, daughter of a wealthy American banker
- The Marquis de la Tour du Pin, Adela's fiancé, an old friend of Hannay
- Lord Mercot, an Oxford undergraduate
- David Warcliff, a ten-year-old schoolboy
- Dominick Medina, a gifted and popular society man, poet and politician
- His mother, a blind and frightening old lady
- Dr Newhover, a medical man
- Madame Breda, a masseuse
- Kharama, an Eastern mystic
- Herr Gaudian, a German engineer

== Film, TV, radio or theatrical adaptations ==
In 1952, a six-part series The Three Hostages with Patrick Barr playing Richard Hannay was broadcast by the BBC.

=== 1977 TV adaptation ===
The novel was adapted for television by the BBC in 1977. Written by John Prebble and directed by Clive Donner, the 85-minute television film The Three Hostages starred Barry Foster as Hannay, Diana Quick as Mary, Alexander Mackay as Hannay's son Peter John, Peter Blythe as Sandy Arbuthnot and John Castle as Medina. It was shown in the United States by PBS.

The film was one in a series of British thrillers set between the wars produced by Mark Shivas. Others included Rogue Male and She Fell Among Thieves.

=== 2003 radio adaptation ===
The story was also adapted for radio by Bert Coules for BBC Radio 4 as a two-part drama starring David Robb as Hannay and Clive Merrison as Sir Walter Bullivant, first broadcast in September 2003.
