= Sandy Arbuthnot =

Ludovic "Sandy" Gustavus Arbuthnot, later 16th Lord Clanroyden is a fictional character who appears in various books by John Buchan in the Richard Hannay series. These books include Greenmantle, The Three Hostages, The Courts of the Morning, and The Island of Sheep, but not the first in the series, The Thirty-Nine Steps. He also appears in The League of Heroes by Xavier Mauméjean. His particular expertise is in adopting disguises which completely take in Hannay, the "friend [he] knows best in the world".

From the data within Buchan's novels, it is possible to deduce that Arbuthnot was born 1882, as the second son of Edward ("Billy") Cospatrick Arbuthnot, 15th Baron Clanroyden (educated at Harrow School). He was educated at Eton College and New College, Oxford, where he gained a Third at Greats. He was a captain in the Tweeddale Yeomanry, later promoted to colonel. He served as honorary attaché at various embassies and worked for the Reform Club in 1899. He married Barbara and settled at an idyllic estate called Laverlaw, near Ettrick in the Borders. It is Lady Clanroyden, presumably Sandy's wife rather than mother, who first appears in print.

Arbuthnot was based on Hon. Colonel Sir Aubrey Herbert (1880–1923; twice offered the throne of Albania, 2nd son of 4th Earl of Carnarvon), but later also reflected T. E. Lawrence. Anne Taylor and James Jauncey have argued that the travels of R. B. Cunninghame Graham in Morocco provided another source of inspiration for the character.
