= A Prince of the Captivity =

1933 novel by John Buchan

- Author: John Buchan
- Language: English
- Genre: Novel
- Publisher: Hodder & Stoughton
- Publication date: 1933
- Media type: Print
- Pages: 383

A Prince of the Captivity is a 1933 novel by the Scottish author John Buchan.

== Plot ==
The hero of the novel is Adam Melfort, who marries young to a beautiful but mindless socialite who cannot return his love for her. When she forges her wealthy uncle's signature on a cheque, he takes the blame to save her family's name, and is jailed, losing his army commission in the process. He allows her to divorce him so that she can remarry someone of more similar mind. Released from jail during World War I, he is recruited as an undercover agent behind enemy lines in Belgium, and later leads an expedition to Greenland to rescue a wealthy American millionaire explorer whose own expedition has met disaster.

== Background ==
The Greenland expedition episode in the novel was inspired by German scientist Alfred Wegener's fatal 1930 expedition.
