= The Dancing Floor =

1926 novel by John Buchan

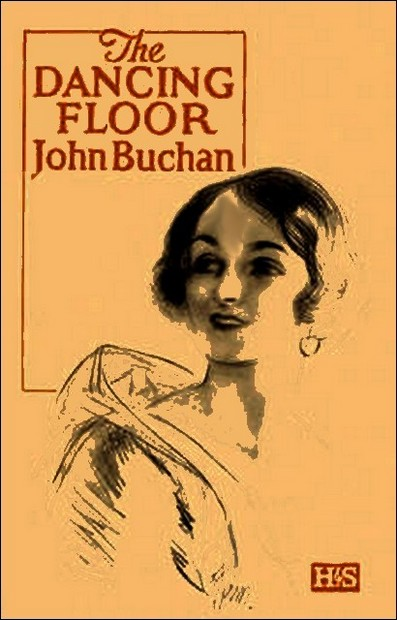
- First British edition
- Author: John Buchan
- Language: English
- Series: Edward Leithen
- Genre: Adventure
- Set in: Greece and England
- Publisher: Hodder & Stoughton (UK); Houghton Mifflin (US)
- Publication date: 1926
- Media type: Print
- Pages: 311

The Dancing Floor is a 1926 novel by the Scottish author John Buchan featuring Edward Leithen. It is the third of Buchan's five Leithen novels.

== Plot ==
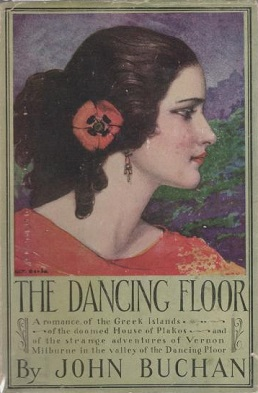
First US edition cover

Edward Leithen, the eminent lawyer, is introduced by his young nephew Charles to Vernon Milburne. In spite of the age difference, Leithen and Vernon become close friends. Vernon confides that since childhood he has had an annually-recurring dream in which he finds himself in a panelled chamber. A closed door faces him, and he knows that beyond that is another identical room, and another, and so on interminably. In one of the rooms something is moving towards him, one room closer each year.

In 1914, Leithen and Vernon join a friend on a cruising holiday in the Aegean. Anchoring the yacht by the island of Plakos, they go ashore near a large fortified house that looms over the harbour. Vernon is fascinated, but Leithen finds the place menacing and sinister.

The friends see less of each other during the war years, but after the armistice Leithen investigates the history of Plakos. He learns that until his recent death the island had been owned by one Shelley Arabin, a man with a reputation for violence and evil who had used the house for dissolute orgies at which ancient pre-Christian Greek gods were worshipped.

Leithen and Vernon are introduced to Koré, a young woman who outrageously flouts the expected manners of her class. She, it transpires, is Shelley Arabin's daughter, and the current owner of Plakos. Not fully understanding the depths of the Greek locals' fear and hate, Koré is stubbornly determined to return to the island to expiate her father's evil legacy. Leithen recognises Koré's naivety behind her confident facade, but in spite of his advice she leaves England for Plakos. Leithen follows. Vernon, meanwhile, and unknown to Leithen, has anchored his yacht in Plakos harbour. He has been preparing himself year by year to meet the closing crisis of his dreams, the final episode of which is now due.

Aided by a Greek army officer, Captain Maris, Leithen attempts but fails to gain access to Koré's house, where she is being held prisoner. The locals intend to burn the building and to sacrifice her as part of an ancient Greek rite. He watches in the moonlight as on a flat area of land known as the Dancing Floor young men take part in a ritual race, the winner having the honour of selecting the male victim who is to die with Koré. Unrecognised by Leithen, the winning runner is Vernon who has disguised himself as a Greek youth. Vernon selects Maris as the male sacrifice, and both enter the house, expecting to find an opportunity to escape. But there is none. Finally, as the flames rise, Koré and Vernon are seen boldly walking out towards the silent villagers, dressed in white as pagan deities summoned by the ancient rite. The villagers panic and flee.

In the house, Vernon had recognised the room that appeared in his dreams, and Koré as his yearly-advancing presence. Now a couple, Vernon and Koré escape from the island on Vernon's yacht along with Leithen, who looks back at the house flaming on the headland.

== Principal characters ==
- Sir Edward Leithen - lawyer and member of parliament
- Vernon Milburne - tall, handsome young man, friend of Leithen
- Koré Arabin - stubborn yet vulnerable daughter of a pagan-worshipping father
- Captain Maris - Greek army officer

== Background ==
In an introductory note, the author states that an episode of the story is taken from his earlier short story "Basilissa". In a 1933 essay, Mary Butts described The Dancing Floor as "one of the first novels to owe its origin to The Golden Bough".
