= Greenmantle =

1916 novel by John Buchan

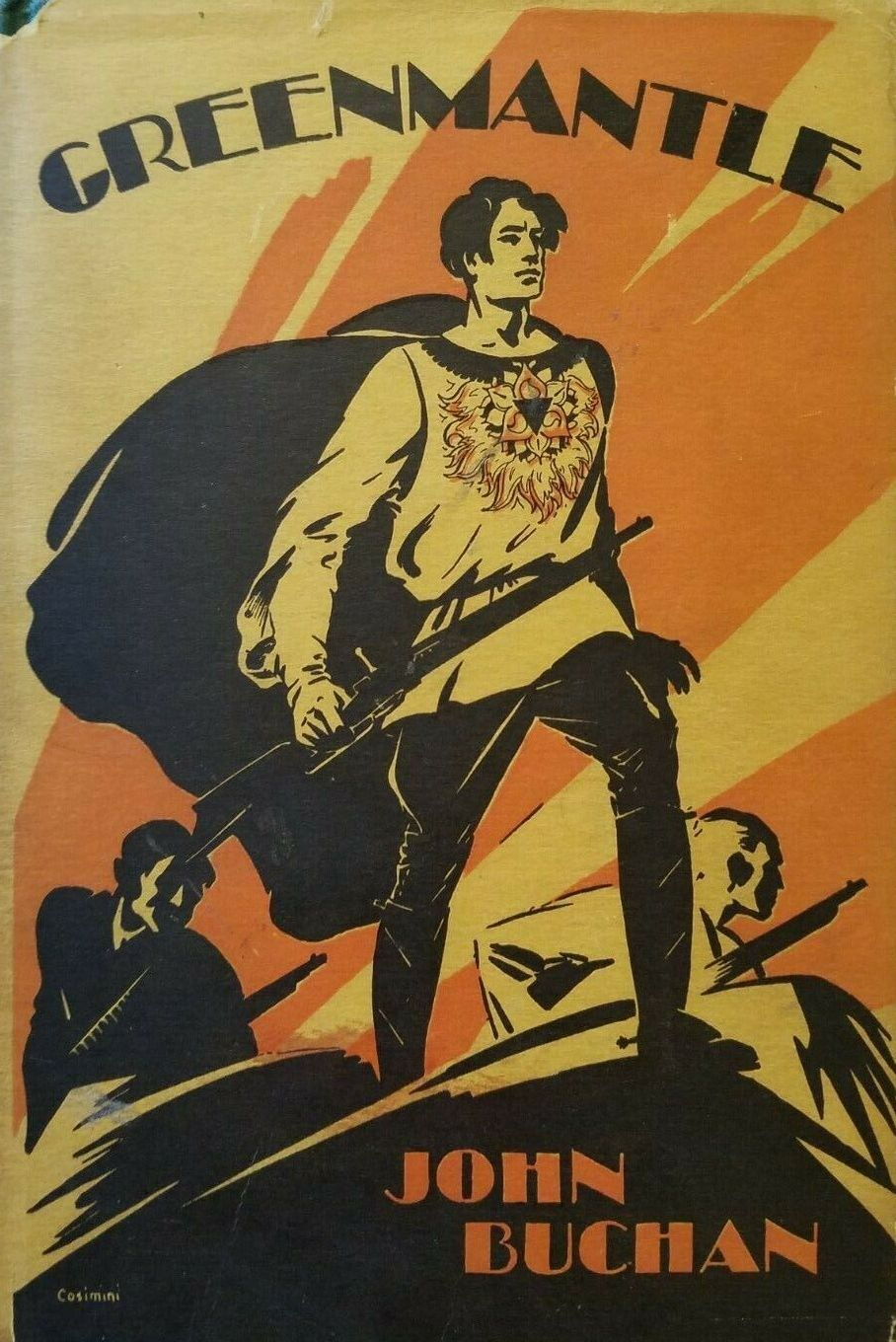
- Cover from a 1928 reprint
- Author: John Buchan
- Language: English
- Series: Richard Hannay
- Genre: Thriller
- Publisher: Hodder & Stoughton, London
- Publication date: 1916
- Publication place: United Kingdom
- Media type: Print (hardback and paperback)
- ISBN: 978-1514836613
- Preceded by: The Thirty-Nine Steps
- Followed by: Mr Standfast

Greenmantle is the second of five novels by John Buchan featuring the character Richard Hannay. It was first published in 1916 by Hodder & Stoughton, London. It is one of two Hannay novels set during the First World War, the other being Mr Standfast (1919); Hannay's first and best-known adventure, The Thirty-Nine Steps (1915), is set in the period immediately preceding the war.

== Plot introduction ==
Hannay is called in to investigate rumours of an uprising in the Muslim world, and undertakes a perilous journey through enemy territory to meet his friend Sandy in Constantinople. Once there, he and his friends must thwart the Germans' plans to use religion to help them win the war, climaxing at the battle of Erzurum.

== Plot summary ==
The book opens in November 1915, with Hannay and his friend Sandy convalescing from wounds received at the Battle of Loos. Sir Walter Bullivant, a senior intelligence officer, summons Hannay to the Foreign Office. Bullivant briefs Hannay on the political situation in the Middle East, suggesting that the Germans and their Turkish allies are plotting to create a Muslim uprising, that will throw the Middle East, India and North Africa into turmoil. Bullivant proposes that Hannay investigate the rumours, following a clue left on a slip of paper with the words "Kasredin", "cancer" and "v.I" written by Bullivant's son, a spy recently killed in the region.

Despite misgivings, Hannay accepts the challenge, and picks Sandy to help him. Bullivant says that American John Blenkiron will be useful. The three meet, ponder their clues, and head to Constantinople. Starting on 17 November, they plan to meet at a hostelry exactly two months later, going each by his own route – Blenkiron travelling through Germany as an observer, Sandy travelling through Asia Minor, using his Arab contacts, while Hannay goes to neutral Lisbon under a Boer guise. There, he meets by chance an old comrade, Boer Peter Pienaar, and the two, posing as anti-British exiles itching to fight for the Germans, are recruited by a German agent. Entering Germany via the Netherlands, they meet the powerful and sinister Colonel Ulrich von Stumm, and convince him they can help persuade the Muslims to join the Germans' side. Hannay has several more adventures, meeting famed mining engineer Herr Gaudian (who later reappears in The Three Hostages), hears of the mysterious Hilda von Einem, and meets the Kaiser.

Finding Stumm plans to send him to Egypt via London, Hannay flees into the snowbound countryside, tracked by the vengeful colonel. He falls ill with malaria and is sheltered during Christmas by a poor woman in a lonely cottage. On his sickbed, he realises that the clue "v.I" on the piece of paper may refer to von Einem, the name he overheard.

Recuperated, he carries on, travelling by barge carrying armaments down the Danube, picking up with Peter Pienaar, who has escaped from a German prison, along the way. They pass through Vienna, Budapest and Belgrade, and as they travel, Hannay connects the phrase "der grüne Mantel" with something else he overheard earlier. They reach Rustchuk (now Ruse, Bulgaria) on 10 January, with a week to go before the rendezvous in Constantinople.

On arrival, Hannay has a run-in with Rasta Bey, an important Young Turk, and intercepts a telegram showing his trail has been detected. They travel by train, fending off an attempt to stop them by the angry Rasta Bey, and reach Constantinople with half a day to spare.

They seek out the meeting place, and are attacked by Bey and an angry mob, but rescued by a band of mysterious, wild dancing men, whom they then antagonize, inadvertently, because of a cultural misunderstanding. Next day they return to the rendezvous, an illicit dance-room, where they find the main entertainment is none other than the wild men of the previous day. At the climax of the performance, soldiers of the Ottoman Minister of War Enver, arrive and drag Hannay and Peter away, apparently to prison, but they instead are delivered to a cozy room containing Blenkiron and the leader of the dancers – none other than the miraculous Sandy Arbuthnot.

They pool their news – Sandy has identified "Kasredin" from their clue sheet as the title of an ancient Turkish allegorical story, the hero of which is a religious leader called Greenmantle, and has heard much of a prophet known as "the Emerald", associated with the play. Blenkiron has met and been impressed by Hilda von Einem, who is in Constantinople and owns the house in which they are staying.

Blenkiron provides Hannay with a new identity, an American engineer named Hannau, and they attend a dinner party where they meet Herr Gaudian again, and Enver. Hannay encounters von Einem, and is fascinated by her; later, he is recognised by Rasta Bey, and has just knocked him out and hidden him in a cupboard when von Einem arrives. Hannay impresses her, and hears she plans to take him East with her. Sandy visits, agrees to deal with the captive Turk and provides news of his own – the clue "Cancer" means the prophet Greenmantle has the disease and is on his deathbed. Blenkiron joins them, and tells them that fighting has become heated between the Russians and the Turks, and they deduce that they will be taken toward Erzerum to help with its defence.

On the long road to Erzerum, they crash their car, and spend the night in a barn, where Hannay has a vivid dream of a hill with a saucepan-like indent in the top, Hannay notes that it is similar to a Kraal. They travel on worn-out horses, but seeing a new car by the roadside, they steal it, only to find it belongs to Rasta Bey. They make good speed, but on arrival in Erzerum, they are delivered straight to Stumm, who recognises Hannay and has them arrested. They are rescued by one of Sandy's men, steal some plans from Stumm, and escape across the rooftops.

With the Battle of Erzurum booming in the background, they realise the importance of the stolen plans, and Peter Pienaar volunteers to sneak through the battle lines and deliver them to the Russians. Sandy appears, magnificently dressed, and reveals that Greenmantle is dead and that he has been chosen to impersonate him. They form a plan to flee around the side of the battle lines, and while Sandy's helper searches for horses, Pienaar starts his dangerous mission.

Pienaar has an eventful and terrifying journey across the battlefield, and Hannay and Blenkiron hide in a cellar. On the third day, they break cover, and make for safety in a wild horse ride, closely pursued by their enemies. On the verge of capture, they find the hill of Hannay's dream, and entrench there, holding the enemy at bay. Hilda von Einem arrives, and appeals to them to give up, but they refuse; she is shocked to learn Sandy is a British officer, and as she leaves, she is slain by a stray Russian shell.

Stumm arrives with artillery, and their position looks sure to be destroyed and overrun, but Stumm waits till dawn to savour his revenge. Just in time, the Russians, helped by the plans delivered by Pienaar, break through the defences and sweep towards the town. Stumm's men flee, Stumm is killed, and Hannay and Sandy meet with Pienaar to ride into the city and victory.

== Principal characters ==
- Richard Hannay, stolid and resourceful soldier and occasional spy
- Sandy Arbuthnot, his multi-lingual friend and fellow soldier
- Peter Pienaar, a friend of Hannay from African days
- Sir Walter Bullivant, a senior intelligence man
- John Scantlebury Blenkiron, a dyspeptic American agent
- Colonel Ulrich von Stumm, a hard-headed German soldier
- Herr Gaudian, a thoughtful German engineer
- Rasta Bey, a quick-tempered Young Turk
- Hilda von Einem, a powerful German operative in Turkey. She is a femme fatale who masterminds a plot to stir up a Muslim jihad against the Allies. She has been described as a "glamorous but merciless female agent" and a "pale-blue-eyed northern goddess". Rosie White suggests that von Einem is a "trope loosely based on Mata Hari" and that she represents a "decadent, oriental sexuality".

== Literary significance and criticism ==
The book was very popular when published, and was read by Robert Baden-Powell and by the Russian imperial family as they awaited the outcome of the revolution in 1917.

"A Mission Is Proposed", the first chapter of Greenmantle, was chosen by Graham Greene for his 1957 anthology The Spy's Bedside Book.

== Non-fictional associations ==
"But all of this nonsense is lashed into the true-enough events of these precarious months in 1916, after the Gallipoli disaster. The Germans supplying munitions to their allies, the Young Turks; a brief glimpse of the Kaiser, astonishingly sympathetically drawn by Britain's future Director of Information and, briefly, Director of Intelligence; the decisive fall of Erzerum, when the Russians exploited a weakness in that town's mountain defences."

The character Sandy Arbuthnot, Hannay's resourceful polyglot friend, was based on Buchan's friend Aubrey Herbert. It has been proposed that he is based on Lawrence of Arabia, but the novel was published in 1916, and Lawrence was first assigned to Feisal's staff in November 1916, before any of his exploits became known, so this is quite impossible. The character of Hannay drew on the real life military officer, Field Marshal Lord Edmund Ironside, 1st Baron Ironside.

Peter Hopkirk's nonfiction work Like Hidden Fire, published in 1997, follows actual German plots to destabilise the region during World War I. While Hopkirk draws various connections between Buchan's work and the historical events, there is no indication that Buchan had knowledge of the actual events or used them as the basis for his story. However, Lewis Einstein's book Inside Constantinople: A Diplomatist's Diary During the Dardanelles Expedition, April to September, 1915 refers to a German woman agitating the Muslim population in Constantinople, in the mode of Hilda von Einem, so this element of the story may have some factual basis.

== Adaptations ==
According to Patrick McGilligan's 2003 biography, Alfred Hitchcock, who directed the 1935 film adaptation of The 39 Steps, preferred Greenmantle and considered filming it on more than one occasion. He wanted to film the book with Cary Grant and Ingrid Bergman in the lead roles, but Buchan's estate wanted too much money for the screen rights. The project did not materialise in Hitchcock's lifetime, and Greenmantle has yet to be filmed.

Producer Ted Black tried to make a version in the mid 40s.

Following the terrorist bombings in London on July 7, 2005, the BBC cancelled its broadcast of Greenmantle as the Radio 4 Classic Serial.

The book has been adapted for broadcast on BBC Radio 4. It was broadcast on BBC Radio4 Extra in two episodes on 27 and 28 August 2013, and again on 30 April and 1 May 2015, with David Robb as Richard Hannay and James Fleet as Sandy Arbuthnot, forced to be 'Greenmantle'.

== See also ==
- Lost Gay Novels
