= The Island of Sheep =

1936 novel by John Buchan

- First edition cover
- Author: John Buchan
- Language: English
- Series: Richard Hannay
- Genre: Thriller
- Set in: Scotland
- Publisher: Hodder & Stoughton
- Publication date: 1936
- Media type: Print (Hardcover & Paperback)
- Preceded by: The Three Hostages / The Courts of the Morning

The Island of Sheep is a 1936 novel by the Scottish author John Buchan, the last of his novels to focus on his characters Richard Hannay and Sandy Arbuthnot. It was published in the United States under the title The Man from the Norlands.

== Plot summary ==
The action occurs twelve years later on from the last novel, when Hannay, now in his fifties, is called by an old oath to protect the son of a man he once knew, who is also heir to the secret of a great treasure. He obtains help from Sandy Arbuthnot, now Lord Clanroyden, and Lombard. The action takes place in England, in Scotland and on the Island of Sheep, which is in what Buchan calls the Norlands: clearly the Faroe Islands. There are several stereotypical villains, in particular D'Ingraville from The Courts of the Morning, and the book also focuses on Hannay's son, Peter John, now a bright but solemn teenager.

In Book I Richard Hannay is on his way down to the Solent to lay up his yacht. He has heard a speech in Parliament from Charles Lamancha, a formidable orator. Lamancha has mentioned the name of one of Hannay's old friends, Lombard, whom Hannay had long forgotten about. By pure coincidence Hannay's train carriage mate turns out to be Lombard himself. Following promises to meet later, Lombard disembarks. Afterwards Hannay's son, Peter John, receives a vile-tempered she-hawk from Archie Roylance, which he christens Morag. Hannay takes Peter John shooting on the Hanham Flats in East Anglia. There they meet a strange man who is behaving as if he is on the run from something or someone. He says that his name is Smith, but Hannay thinks that he is Northern European. Hannay then meets Clanroyden, who reveals a Chinese jade tablet and tells Hannay about old Haraldsen. Hannay responds with his own tale about Haraldsen, also involving Lombard and Peter Pienaar in Rhodesia, which introduced the villains Erick Albinus, a Danish American, and a City of London bigshot called Aylmer Troth; the story ended with the gang's arrest and Troth's death. Clanroyden brings old Haraldsen's son to Hannay. Hannay recognises him as Smith from the Hanham shooting holiday. Haraldsen is being hounded by villains including Albinus, Aylmer Troth's son, Lancelot, and a third man, named Barralty. Hannay meets Lombard again, as well as Macgillivray, who does not know much about this gang. Clanroyden suggests Hannay and Haraldsen move up to Laverlaw.

In Book II Hannay, Haraldsen and Peter John are at Sandy's ancestral manor, Laverlaw. There they witness sheepshearing and a wedding. Lombard arrives, having only just saved Haraldsen's daughter Anna from the villains with a mad dash by car north from Northamptonshire. Clanroyden joins them later.

In Book III Hannay and his friends sail to the Island of Sheep, and meet Haraldsen and Anna there. One day Peter John and Anna go canoeing, and come upon a Danish trawler, the "Tjaldar". They meet the real villain, Jacques D'Ingraville, on board and are captured, but one of the crewmen, Martel, helps them to escape. They arrive back at the island and summon the whalers from the Grind for help. Meanwhile, Hannay, Lombard, Geordie Hamilton and Haraldsen receive a message from Morag that they are about to be attacked. They barricade the house. D'Ingraville, Martel and a Spaniard, Carreras, arrive to offer terms. Hannay lets Martel into the house to negotiate and Martel reveals himself to be Sandy Clanroyden. Clanroyden assures Hannay that the children are all right and then rejoins D'Ingraville, after which his cover is blown by Haraldsen. Clanroyden manages to escape and joins Hannay on the roof. Haraldsen goes berserk and throws D'Ingraville to his death off a cliff. Anna and Peter John then arrive with the whalers. The criminal gang is subdued. Lancelot Troth, Albinus and Barralty make peace with Haraldsen, and are invited to dinner with him. Clanroyden gives his jade tablet to Troth.

== Characters ==
- Major-General Sir Richard Hannay, KCB, OBE
- Colonel Sandy Arbuthnot, Lord Clanroyden
- Mr Lombard, a merchant banker
- Marius Eliaser Haraldsen, an adventurer and father of
- Valdemar Haraldsen, father of
- Anna Haraldsen, a schoolgirl
- Peter John Hannay, a schoolboy, son of Sir Richard
- Geordie Hamilton
- Miss Lydia Ludlow, an actress
- Jacques D'Ingraville
- Lancelot Troth, a solicitor
- Erick Albinus, a Dane
- Joseph Bannatyne Barralty, a stockbroker
- Frankie Varrinder
- Carreras, a Spaniard
- Martel, a Belgian

== Title ==
The novel reuses a title that Buchan had used seventeen years earlier for a political book, The Island of Sheep (1919), written in conjunction with his wife under the pseudonym 'Cadmus and Harmonia'. Sales of that book in the United States had been disappointing, and Buchan insisted on reusing the title in 1936 against the advice of his American publishers who still held unsold stocks of the earlier book. The 1936 novel was published in the US under the title The Man from the Norlands.
