= Edward Leithen =

Sir Edward Leithen is a fictional character in several of John Buchan's novels: The Power-House, John Macnab, The Dancing Floor, The Gap in the Curtain and Sick Heart River. These were published over a number of years, the first in 1916 (although "The Power House" was originally published in a magazine in 1913), and the last in 1941, one year after Buchan's death. Leithen's name is borrowed from the Leithen Water, a tributary of the River Tweed, one of many references to the Scottish Borders in Buchan's novels.

He also appears in The Return of John MacNab by Andrew Greig in a 1990s retelling of John Macnab.

== Career ==
In the books, Leithen is a Scottish barrister and a Conservative politician (and MP) and, at one point, Attorney General. He is also described as an excellent fly fisherman (which forms an important part of John MacNab.).

He served in the British Army during World War I, starting as a private in the Grenadier Guards and ending as a GSO 1 (General Staff Officer - Grade 1, probably a lieutenant-colonel or colonel).

== Personality ==
In a number of ways, Leithen resembles Buchan himself, moving amongst high society, and espousing Conservative values. However, Leithen also has a playful side, as can be seen in John Macnab. Because of the long period over which the Leithen novels were written, and the autobiographical element, we can see a real progression and change in the character: by Sick Heart River (1941), the character is old and weary.

In Sick Heart River Leithen is diagnosed with terminal tuberculosis. He decides to spend his last days tracking down a missing financier who has had a nervous breakdown and fled to Canada. Leithen finds the man but decides to stay with some Indians and help them fight a disease epidemic. Leithen succeeds in helping the Indians and dies a happy man.

== See also ==
- Richard Hannay
- Archie Roylance
- Sandy Clanroyden
- John Palliser-Yeates
