= John Prebble =

English journalist, novelist, screenwriter (1915–2001)

John Edward Curtis Prebble, FRSL, OBE, (23 June 1915 – 30 January 2001) was an English journalist, novelist, and screenwriter. He is known for his books on Scottish history.

== Early life ==
He was born in Edmonton, Middlesex, England, but in 1921 he emigrated with his parents to Saskatchewan, Canada, where his father's brother was living. Returning to Edmonton with his family when aged 12, he attended the Latymer School. He joined the Communist Party of Great Britain but abandoned it after World War II.

== The High Girders ==
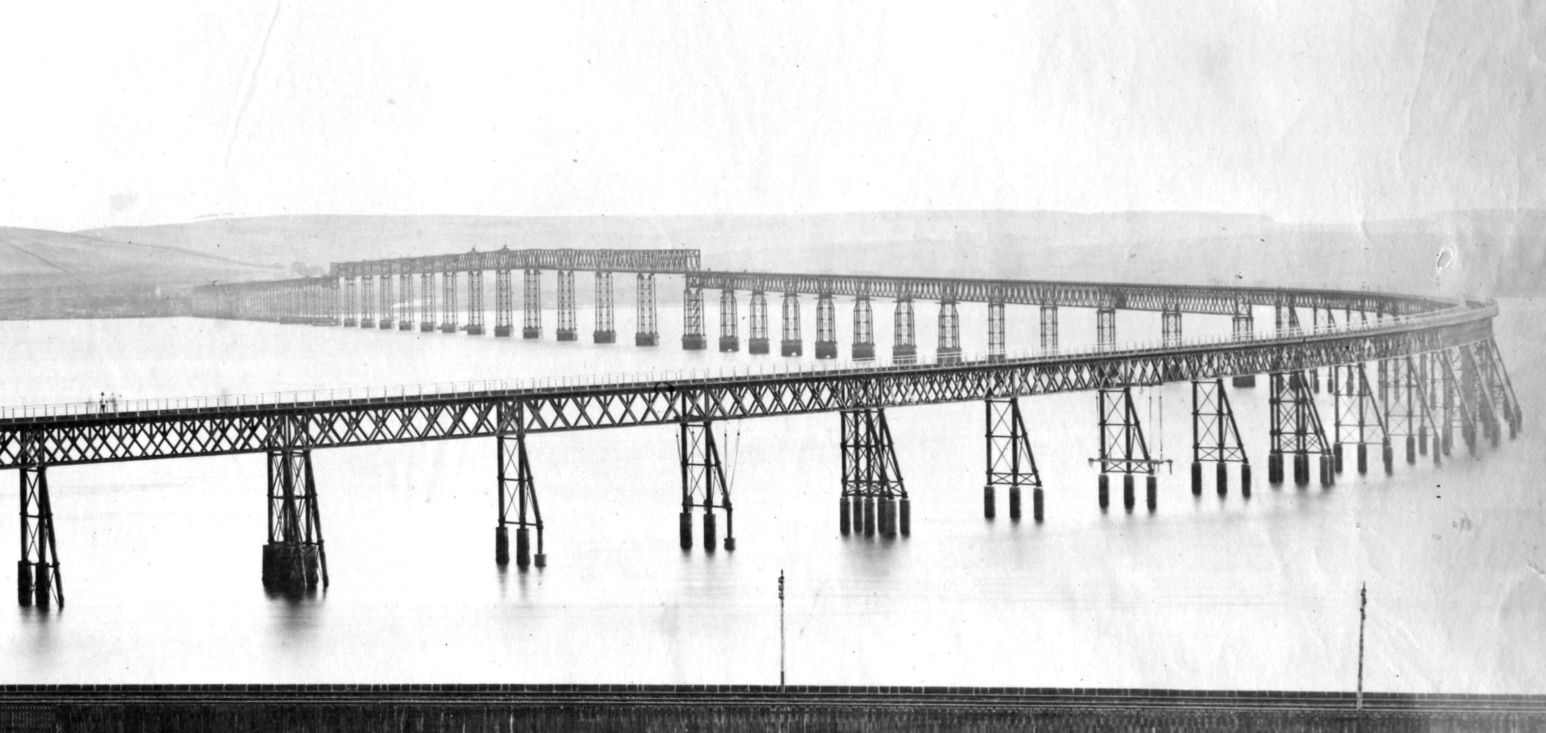
Original Tay Bridge from the north

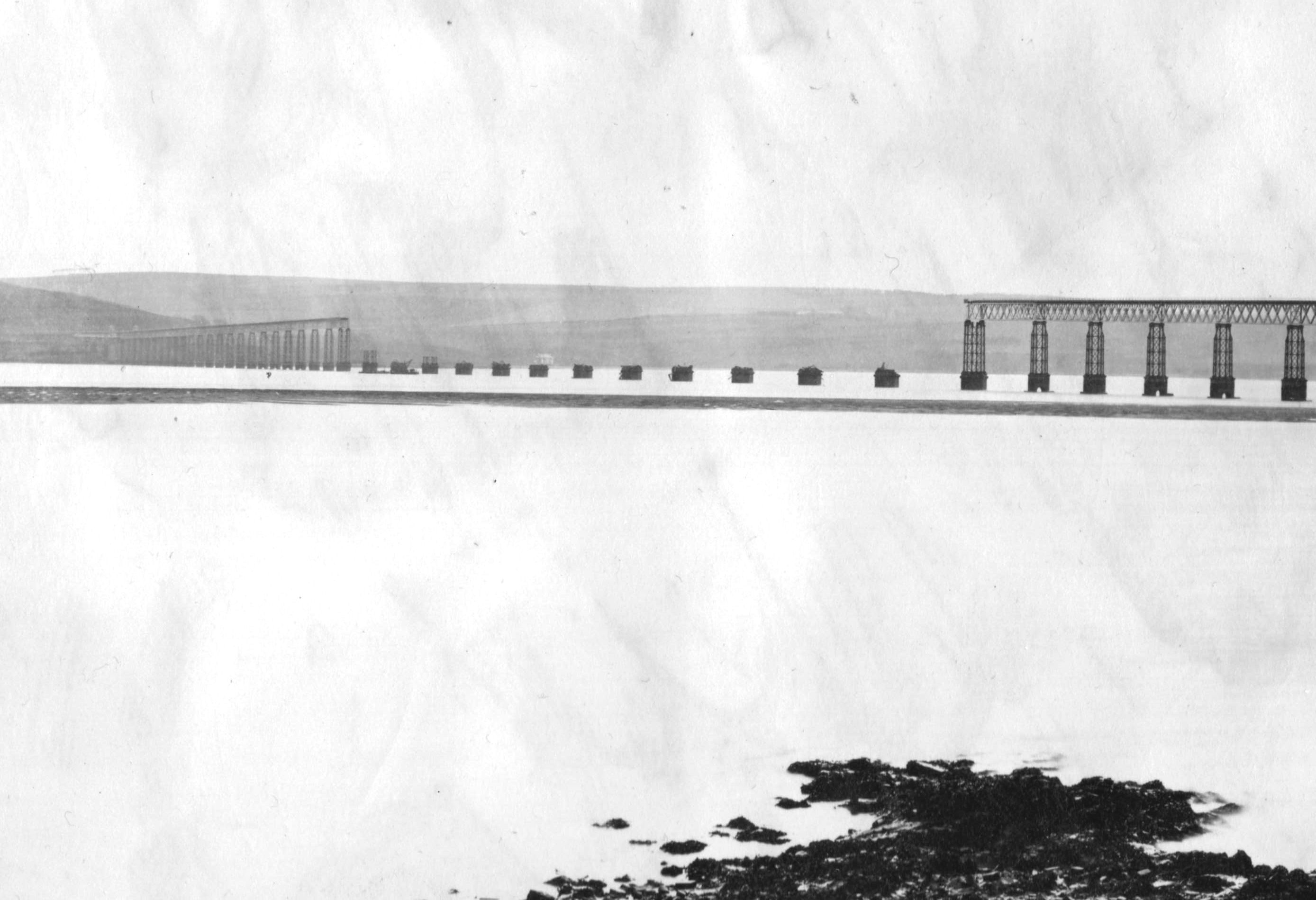
Fallen Tay Bridge from the north

He became a journalist in 1934 and served with the Royal Artillery during World War II. His wartime experiences led to his novels, Where the Sea Breaks (1944), and The Edge of Darkness (1947). His Canadian prairie experience influenced two of his works, The Buffalo Soldier, a historical novel about the American West, specifically the 10th Cavalry Regiment, and Culloden, about the 1746 battle which resulted in the defeat of the Jacobite uprising. The story of Battle of Culloden had been part of the family lore when he grew up in the predominantly Scottish township of Sutherland, in rural Saskatchewan. His interest in the American West was also inspired by the fact that part of his family lineage was Native American: his 1958 book, My Great-Aunt, Appearing Day, and Other Stories tells of a Cheyenne relative named Appearing Day. (Note: The characters Josh Tanner and Appearing Day are based on Prebble's great grandmother's brother, Charles Petley, and his second wife, "a Cheyenne Indian called Dawn".)

One of his first big successes was The High Girders (1956), a description of the Tay Bridge Disaster, involving the collapse of the first Tay rail bridge to Dundee. It has remained a popular work ever since publication. It was the first detailed account of the disaster to expose the many problems encountered during construction of the bridge, and Prebble also made extensive use of the Board of Trade Public Inquiry in reviewing the evidence. He included some of the many photographs made at the time, and which show the extent of devastation of the centre part of the bridge on the night of 28 December 1879.

There is still controversy over the detailed causes of the failure, particularly regarding the poor design and construction of the cast iron columns, and the storm raging at the time of the fall. However, the original conclusions of the Inquiry still stand. It found that the bridge fell owing to "bad design, bad construction and bad maintenance".

== Fire and Sword Trilogy ==
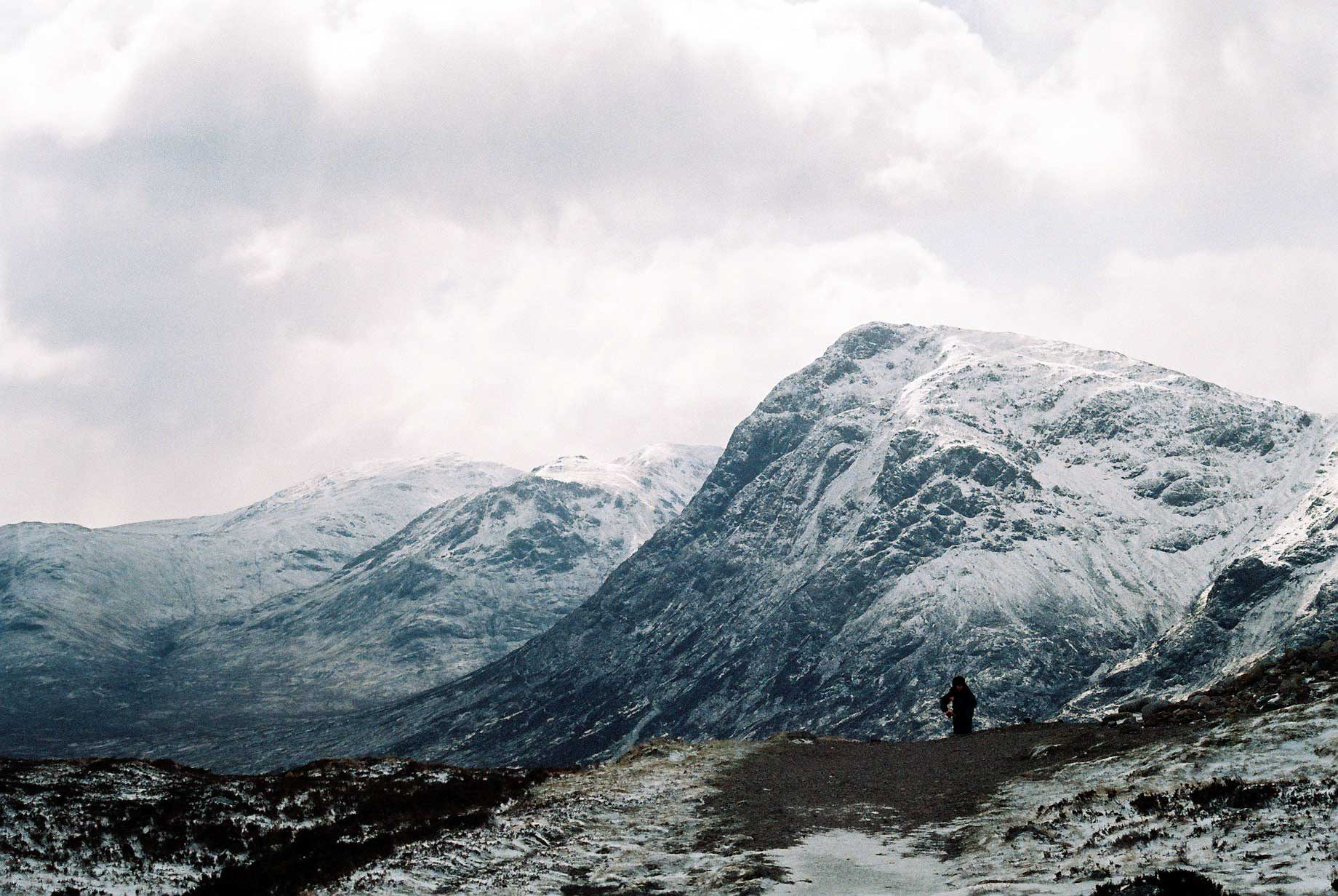
Glencoe

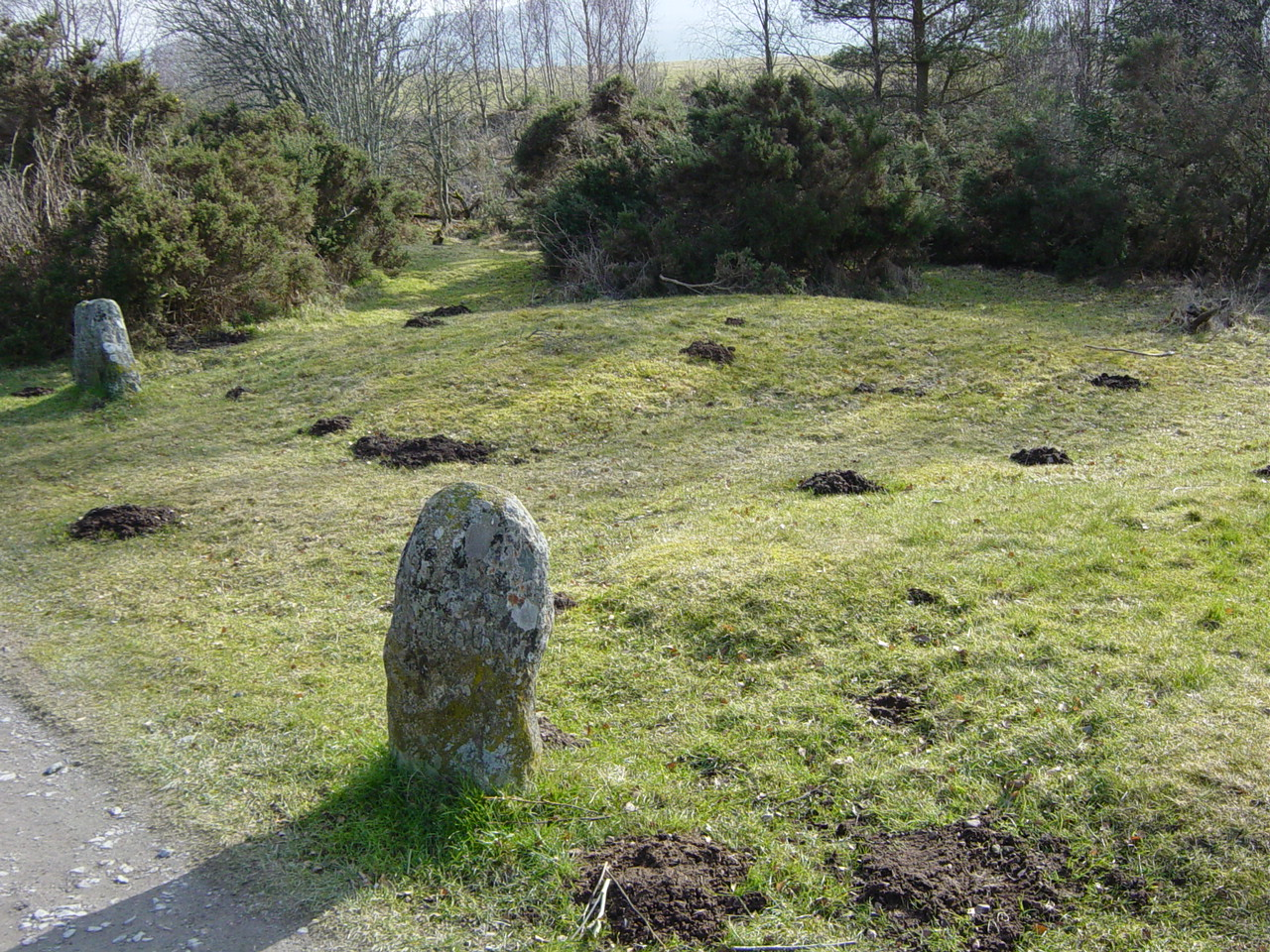
Mass graves of clansmen at Culloden Battlefield.

The Fire and Sword Trilogy is about the fall of the Scottish clan system. Culloden was the first book and it chronicles the defeat of the clans in one pivotal battle. The two other works were The Highland Clearances (1963) and Glencoe (1966). Glencoe was a study of the causes and effects of the Glencoe massacre in 1692, when government soldiers and members of the Campbell Clan attacked and killed members of Clan Donald who lived in Glencoe, a remote glen in the west highlands of Scotland. The book focuses on the political machinations to bring the unruly MacDonalds to heel, both by King William and by Scots with ambitions in royal circles. The massacre was notorious, both then and now, for the Campbells had abused the hospitality of the MacDonalds who had given them food and lodgings for several days before.

His later works, Mutiny (1975) and The King's Jaunt (1988) would extend the theme. The Highland Clearances remains one of his best known works perhaps because the subject of the Highland clearances as a discrete historical event remains a subject of debate. Historian Tom Devine credits Prebble with tackling "an important and controversial subject" which was being largely ignored at the time by academic historians – the first comprehensive history of the clearances to be produced by a professional historian was published in 1982, some 19 years after Prebble brought the subject to attention. However, Devine also lists some of the defects of Prebble's Highland Clearances as a work of history.

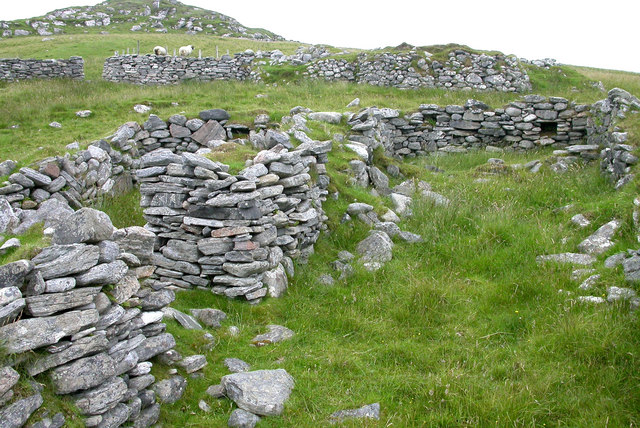
Ruined croft houses on Fuaigh Mòr in Loch Roag. The island was cleared of its inhabitants in 1841 and is now only used for grazing sheep

Prebble makes a case that there was a conscious effort to remove Highlanders and Islanders from Scotland. Others argue that it was purely economic and social factors which led to the population decline in rural Scotland. The historiographer royal in Scotland, Gordon Donaldson, was particularly cutting in his criticism and declared Prebble's books to be "utter rubbish". Prebble's obituary in the Daily Telegraph said "he was often accused of ignoring economic factors in his analysis of social change, but his books, though unashamedly partisan, were based on thorough research". Tom Devine reports the opinion of historians that Prebble's Highland Clearances was under-researched and lacking in critical perspective. Devine takes the view that Prebble relies extensively on the late 19th century accounts of the Clearances, (much of that being highly partisan or politically motivated), with no evidence of any original research.

== The Darien Disaster ==
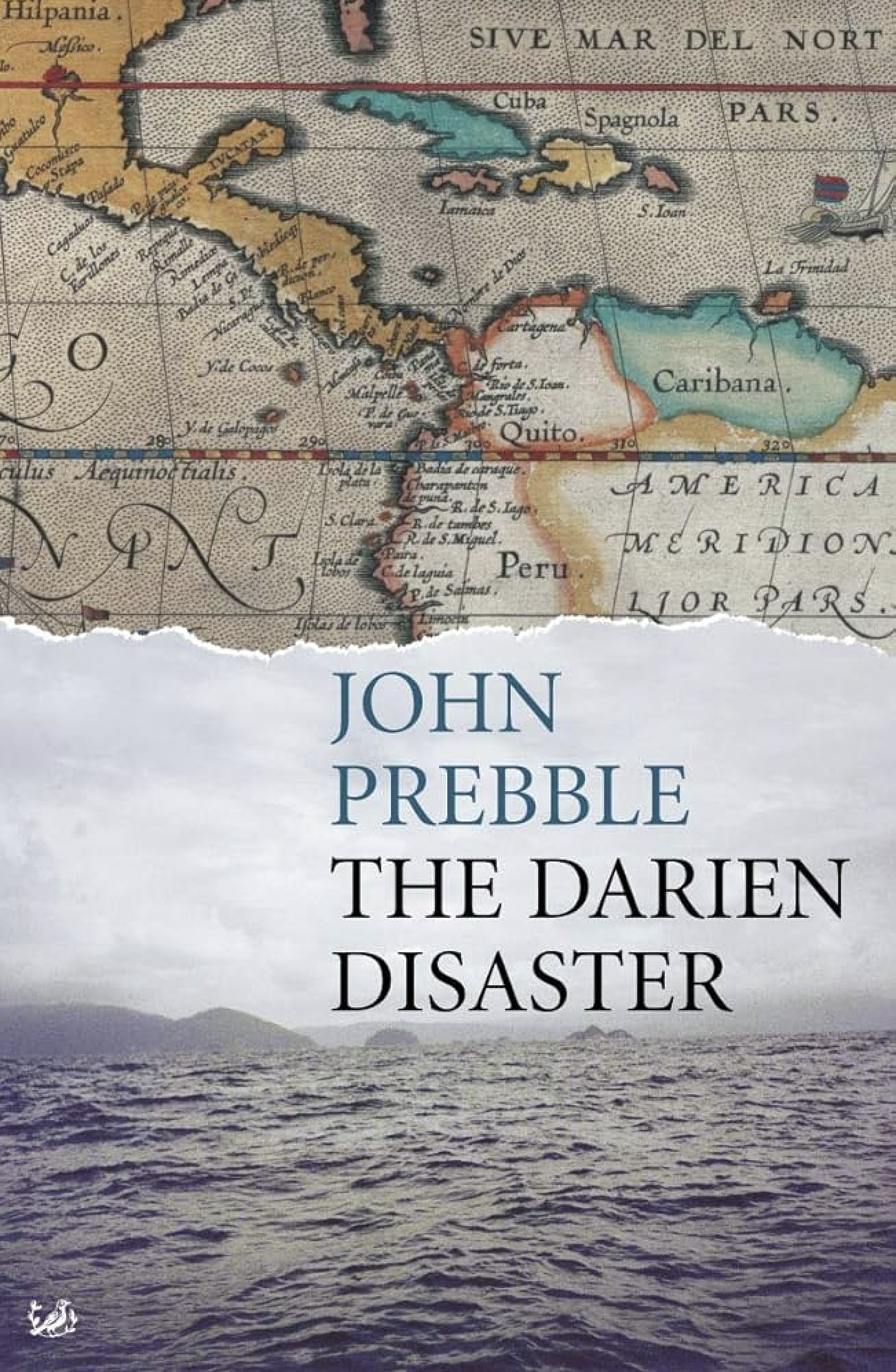
The Darien Disaster: John Prebble (Originally Published 1968)

This captivating exposé documents the failure of the Scottish nation to establish a trading colony in nowadays Panama at great expense and at the cost of thousands of lives. Originally published in 1968, Prebble draws from a range of primary sources from personal accounts (journals, letters and memoirs) by the colonists and architects of the scheme, as well as records from the Company of Scotland trading Africa and the Indies. While maintaining historical accuracy, the book reads like an absorbing novel with a particular focus on the political rivalries amongst the leadership of the venture. As a comprehensive chronology of the unfortunate events, the book seeks to explain the myriad challenges the colonists faced from direct opposition by the English and Spanish, as well as the tragic fates of each ship and her crew, save the Caledonia; the flagship of the first expedition and the only one to make it back to the motherland.

The Darien Disaster was a best-seller, being reissued in paperback in 1978 and again in 2002.

== Other media ==
His short story My Great-Aunt Appearing Day, first published in 1952 in Lilliput magazine, became the basis of the 1955 film White Feather. He wrote an article entitled "Slaughter in the Sun" for Lilliput in 1958, on which the film Zulu (1964) would be based, co-written by Prebble and the director, Cy Endfield. He contributed to television on the limited serials The Six Wives of Henry VIII (1970), Elizabeth R (1971) and The Borgias (1981).

He also wrote radio dramas and documentaries for the BBC. They were usually, but not always, based on his published works. For example, in 1977, he wrote an adaptation of John Buchan's The Three Hostages.

== Personal ==
He was married to the artist Betty (Golby) Prebble. He had a daughter, Sarah Prebble, and two sons, Jolyon and actor and narrator Simon Prebble. His first wife died in 1993 and he married his long-term mistress Jan Reid in 1994.

== Publications include ==
=== Fiction ===
- Where the Sea Breaks, Secker & Warburg, 1944
- Edge of Darkness, Secker and Warburg, 1947
- Age without Pity, Secker & Warburg, 1950
- The Brute Streets, Secker & Warburg, 1954
- The Mather Story, Secker & Warburg, 1954
- My Great-Aunt, Appearing Day, And Other Stories, Secker and Warburg, 1958
- The Buffalo Soldiers, New York Harcourt, Brace & Company, 1959
- Spanish Stirrup, and other stories, Holt, Rinehart and Winston, 1973

=== History ===
- Disaster at Dundee, Harcourt, Brace & Co., 1956 (also published as High Girders: The Tay Bridge Disaster, 1879, Secker and Warburg, 1975)
- Culloden, Secker & Warburg, 1961
- The Highland Clearances, Secker & Warburg, 1963
- Glencoe: The Story of the Massacre, Secker & Warburg, 1966
- The Lion in the North: A Personal View of Scotland's History, Penguin Books, 1973, ISBN 0-14-003652-0
- Darien: The Scottish Dream of Empire (also published as Darien: A Scots Colony in the New World, 1698–1700), 1968, about the Darien scheme
- Mutiny: Highland Regiments in Revolt, 1743–1804, 1975, ISBN 0-14-004328-4
- The Borgias (with Sarah Bradford), 1981
- The King's Jaunt: George IV in Scotland, August, 1822, Birlinn Limited, Edinburgh, 2000, ISBN 1-84158-068-6 (originally published in 1988)

=== Other books ===
- Elephants and Ivory: True Tales of Hunting and Adventure, John Alfred Jordan (as told to John Prebble); also published as Mongaso Man Who Is Always Moving: The Story of an African Hunter John Alfred Jordan (1956)
- John Prebble's Scotland, Secker & Warburg, 1984, ISBN 0-436-38634-8
- Landscapes and Memories, An Intermittent Autobiography, Harper Collins, London, 1993 ISBN 0-00-215184-7

== Films ==
- Culloden, BBC documentary, 1964 written by Prebble and directed by Peter Watkins.
- Zulu, screenplay

== Honours and awards ==
- FRSL (1963)
- OBE (1998)
