= The Courts of the Morning =

1929 novel by John Buchan

- First edition
- Author: John Buchan
- Language: English
- Series: Richard Hannay
- Genre: Thriller, Novel
- Publisher: Hodder & Stoughton (UK); Houghton Mifflin company (US)
- Publication date: 1929
- Publication place: Scotland
- Media type: Print
- Pages: 405
- Text: The Courts of the Morning online

First US edition

The Courts of the Morning is a 1929 adventure novel by John Buchan, featuring his character Sandy Arbuthnot. The prologue is narrated by Richard Hannay, so the novel is sometimes included in Buchan's Hannay series. The action is set in Olifa, a fictional country on the west coast of South America.

== Plot introduction ==
When Sandy Arbuthnot's friend John Blenkiron discovers that a charismatic industrial tycoon is plotting to rule the world from his base in the small South American country of Olifa, Sandy leads a revolution to scuttle the plot and allow the Olifans to decide their own fate.

== Plot summary ==
The book opens with a prologue narrated by Hannay, describing how Hannay is approached by the American military attache in London to covertly solve the mystery of Blenkiron's disappearance in South America. Hannay seeks out his friend Sandy Arbuthnot for help, but Sandy soon disappears, sending Hannay a mysterious letter saying to lie low and keep quiet.

The action next moves to Olifa, where Archie and Janet Roylance are honeymooning. The Roylances are intrigued by two sets of people they meet: a party of boorish American tourists and the strange, half-sleepwalking copper miners from the city of Gran Seco, which is ruled by a powerful mining tycoon, Gobernador Castor. As Archie and Janet explore and befriend Castor, it becomes clear that the Americans are using their apparently innocent curiosity as a cover for spying on Castor, and that one of them may be Sandy in disguise.

Sandy meets Archie and Janet in secret and tells them they are in danger, but they insist on staying and helping him uncover Castor's plot. At the hacienda of Olifan Don Luis, Sandy explains what he and Blenkiron have uncovered: Castor enslaves Indians, pulls the strings of the government, controls his followers using a local drug, astura, and is a megalomaniac out to destroy democracy by causing civil war in America. Sandy and Don Luis plan to lead an Indian uprising that will not fight Castor but call him leader, embarrassing him.

Everyone agrees to help, and Archie and Janet use their friendship with Castor to kidnap him, while Sandy and Blenkiron begin the revolution by seizing the copper mines. Sandy has a close shave with death in which he discovers his old school pal Lariarty is one of Castor's addicted minions.

The second part of the story is set at the titular Courts of the Morning, the rebel's secret base in the north of Olifa. Here, Janet and Barbara Dasent, Blenkiron's niece, try to reform Castor into a decent human being. Meanwhile, Sandy and Don Luis engage in guerrilla warfare against the superior Olifa army. Castor's closest confidants, lost without their supply of the drug, make at attempt to rescue Castor but capture Janet instead, kidnapping her. This incident wins Castor entirely to the rebel cause, but a distraught Archie flies into the wild Indian territory to search for Janet, crashing his plane and wandering through the jungle. In the Indian country, Janet is held prisoner for seven days, finally escaping with the help of Archie and Don Luis.

In the concluding section, Don Luis reveals that he has been planning a general revolution for three years and the country is ready to rise. Castor, a man reborn, takes the command from Sandy. The Olifa army remains a threat until Sandy daringly blows up a mountain pass, cutting the huge army in two and allowing the rebels to take enough prisoners to force the government to surrender. At the moment of victory, however, the drug addicts make one final revenge attempt, killing Castor and Lariarty, although Janet and Barbara survive. Don Luis is elected the new president, and Sandy refuses a prestigious post in favour of returning home to Scotland and marrying Barbara.

== Characters ==
- Sandy Arbuthnot, an at-loose-ends Scottish adventurer
- Janet Roylance, a newlywed romantic who inspires everyone around her to good
- Archie Roylance, a newlywed retired pilot eager for adventure
- Barbara Dasent, an American nurse trying to save her country
- Don Luis de Marzaniga, an idealistic, clever patriot
- Gobernador Castor, an egotistical intellectual with very little conscience
- John Blenkiron, an agent for the American government
- Geordie Hamilton, a Scottish ex-soldier providing muscle and support

== Literary significance and criticism ==
Buchan's fifteenth novel, The Courts of the Morning was published in September, 1929, by Hodder & Stoughton. Contemporary reviewer J. B. Priestley criticized the lengthy space devoted to detailing troop movements and describing the terrain, exposition that slows down the more thrilling sequences such as Janet's hostage ordeal. (Buchan never went to South America, so all the lovingly described landscapes are fictional.) Buchan's biographer Andrew Lownie also felt that Castor's redemption was unrealistic.

== Allusions ==
The character of Sandy Arbuthnot was partly based on Buchan's friend, Aubrey Herbert.

== See also ==
The other Buchan novels that feature Sandy Arbuthnot are:

- Greenmantle (1916)
- The Three Hostages (1924)
- The Island of Sheep (1936)
