= Sick Heart River =

1941 novel by John Buchan

- First edition cover
- Author: John Buchan
- Language: English
- Set in: Canada
- Publisher: Hodder & Stoughton
- Publication date: 1941
- Media type: Print
- Pages: 318

Sick Heart River (1941) is a novel by Scottish author John Buchan set in Canada. It was published posthumously. The book was published in the United States under the title Mountain Meadow.

== Plot summary ==
Sir Edward Leithen is diagnosed with advanced tuberculosis and given a year to live. While he is deciding how to spend his remaining days, an American associate, John S. Blenkiron, requests help to find his niece's husband, Francis Galliard, who has disappeared from his very successful financial career in New York and fled to Canada.

Leithen follows Galliard to Quebec. During this he finds a mountain meadow he had seen on a trip thirty years earlier and which has stayed in his memory since.

Leithen finds Galliard and nurses him back to health. He then decides to stay with some Indians and help them.

== Background ==
Buchan wrote this novel while he was Governor General of Canada and Chancellor of the University of Edinburgh. It was published posthumously following his death as a result of a fall and a stroke. It is one of Buchan's most spiritual novels, exploring the themes of death and redemption.

The fictional Sick Heart River is in the real region of the Nahanni River in Canada's Northwest Territories. The area was only just being mapped when Buchan, as Governor General Lord Tweedsmuir, passed nearby during his voyage down the Mackenzie River in the summer of 1937. Buchan always wanted to visit the Nahanni but never made it before his death in February 1940.

== Reviews ==
- Ritchie, Harry (1981), Buchan and Linklater, which includes a review of Sick Heart River, in Murray, Glen (ed.), Cencrastus No. 7, Winter 1981-82, p.46, ISSN 0264-0856
