= Richard Hannay =

- First appearance: The Thirty-Nine Steps
- Last appearance: Sick Heart River
- Created by: John Buchan
- Portrayed by: Robert Donat (film); Orson Welles (radio); Jack Livesey (BBC radio); Glenn Ford (radio); Herbert Marshall (radio); Kenneth More (film); James Mckechnie (BBC radio); Christopher Cazenove (BBC TV documentary); Barry Foster (TV film); Robert Powell (film, television); David Rintoul (BBC radio); David Robb (BBC radio); Rupert Penry-Jones (BBC TV film); Robert Whitelock (stage); Charles Edwards (stage); Sam Robards (stage); Jorge de Juan (stage); Christophe Laubion (stage); Daniel Llewelyn-Williams (stage); Andrew Alexander (stage); Brian Smolin (stage); Todd Waite (stage); Keegan Colcleasure (stage)

In-universe information
- Gender: Male
- Occupation: Soldier; Spy
- Nationality: British

Major-General Sir Richard Hannay KCB DSO OBE is a fictional character created by Scottish novelist John Buchan and further made popular by the 1935 Alfred Hitchcock film The 39 Steps (and other later film adaptations), very loosely based on Buchan's 1915 novel of the same name. In his autobiography, Memory Hold-the-Door, Buchan suggests that the character is based, in part, on Edmund Ironside, a British Army field marshal and CIGS from Edinburgh who was a spy during the Second Boer War.

== Novels ==
=== By Buchan ===
Hannay appears in several novels as a major character, including:

- The Thirty-Nine Steps (1915)
- Greenmantle (1916)
- Mr Standfast (1919)
- The Three Hostages (1924)
- The Island of Sheep (1936)

He also appears as a minor character in:

- The Runagates Club (1928) short story, 'The Green Wildebeest'
- The Courts of the Morning (1929)
- Sick Heart River (1940)

=== By other authors ===
Robert J. Harris has written The Thirty-One Kings (2017) which purports to be the beginning of a new series called "Richard Hannay Returns" about his adventures during World War II; however the next book in the series, Castle Macnab (2018), is set in the 1920s.

In Combined Forces (1985), a humorous novel by Jack Smithers, Hannay teams up after World War II with the similar heroes "Sapper"'s Bulldog Drummond and Dornford Yates' Jonah Mansel.

- Thirty-Nine Steps From Baker Street (J. R. Trtek, 2015, 978-1-51715-300-7)

There is also "A Very Dangerous Pursuit (The Richard Hannay Adventures, Book 1)" by Ben Miller, set in 1912, published by Harper Collins on May 21, 2026, ISBN 9780008747459

== Radio, film, television and theatre ==
Hannay has been portrayed in four film versions of The Thirty Nine Steps respectively, by actors Robert Donat (in the original and most famous film adaptation, directed by Alfred Hitchcock in 1935), Kenneth More and Rupert Penry-Jones (in a 2008 BBC production).

Robert Powell has had the longest association with the role. He first appeared as Hannay in the 1978 film adaptation, and then reprised the role for the ITV series Hannay (1988–1989). He also read an audio book adaptation in 2007.

Orson Welles portrayed Hannay in a radio play of The Thirty-Nine Steps in 1938, as did Glenn Ford in 1948 on Studio One, Herbert Marshall on Suspense in 1952.

The 1973 BBC documentary Omnibus: The British Hero had Christopher Cazenove playing Hannay in a scene from Mr. Standfast, as well as a number of other such heroic characters, including Beau Geste, Bulldog Drummond and James Bond. Barry Foster played Hannay in a 1977 television adaptation of The Three Hostages.

In the 2000s, BBC Radio 4 adapted four of the Hannay books, each starring David Robb: The Thirty-Nine Steps (2001), Greenmantle (2005), Mr Standfast (2008) and The Three Hostages (2009).

Playwright Patrick Barlow's comedic stage adaptation of the 1935 Hitchcock film opened in London's Tricycle Theatre, and after a successful run, transferred to the Criterion Theatre in Piccadilly. On 15 January 2008, the show made its US Broadway premiere at the American Airlines Theatre; it transferred to the Cort Theatre on 29 April 2008 and then moved to the Helen Hayes Theatre on 21 January 2009, where it ended its run on 10 January 2010. It reopened at off-Broadway venue New World Stages on 25 March 2010. The London show closed on 5 September 2015 after nine years in the West End. In this theatrical adaptation, the character's full name is given as Richard Charles Arbuthnot Hannay.

== Character biography based on the Buchan canon ==
As revealed through the various novels, Richard Hannay was born in Scotland about 1877; his father was Scottish and had German business partners. He was brought up to speak German pretty fluently. At the age of six he joins his father in South Africa. He becomes a mining engineer, spending three years prospecting for copper in German Damaraland and makes a small fortune in Bulawayo. He takes part in the Matabele Wars, serves two years with the Imperial Light Horse and serves as an intelligence officer at Delagoa Bay in the Boer War. He goes to England in 1914, shortly before the events of The Thirty-Nine Steps.

The First World War breaks out seven weeks after the events of The Thirty-Nine Steps, and Hannay immediately joins the New Army, and is promptly commissioned captain on the strength of his Matebele campaign experience. He is wounded in the leg and neck in the Battle of Loos in September 1915, by which time he had reached the rank of major. Greenmantle, the sequel to The Thirty-Nine Steps begins in late 1915, with Hannay in Hampshire where he has arrived to convalesce after Loos. During the events of Greenmantle, his work as a spy in wartime Europe and Turkey earn him a DSO and CB, respectively. Following this, he returns to regular service in the army and is rapidly promoted to brigadier-general. In early 1917, however, he is called back to the Secret Service to hunt a dangerous German spy during the decisive months of the First World War. As told in Mr Standfast, he meets and falls in love with Mary Lamington, an intelligent, beautiful young nurse and fellow spy. Later, in 1918, now promoted to major-general, he returns to the front lines and participates in desperate fighting following the Germans' massive, last-ditch effort to win the war.

Soon after the end of the war, Hannay marries Mary Lamington, and the following year they have a son, Peter John Hannay. The boy is named after Hannay's two great friends John Scantlebury Blenkiron (an American businessman and spy who had often helped him) and Peter Pienaar ("Mr Standfast"), an old Boer scout who seems to have been a kind of father-figure to him. The family settles in Mary's old home in the Cotswolds, Fosse Manor, Oxfordshire and Hannay (now a KCB) finds peace and enjoyment as a farmer. However, in 1920 or 1921, Hannay again finds himself in an adventure, this time with his wife's help unravelling a kidnapping mystery in The Three Hostages.

His last adventure, The Island of Sheep, occurs some 12 years later when Hannay, now in his fifties, is called by an old oath to protect the son of a man he once knew, who safeguards the secret of the greatest treasure on earth. This book also focuses on Hannay's son, Peter John, now a bright but solemn teenager.

Though the Hannay books stop short of the Second World War, Buchan's last novel, Sick Heart River (published just after the author died in 1940) offers a hint about Hannay's future: dying in Canada, Hannay's friend Sir Edward Leithen hears of the outbreak of war in Europe and guesses that many of his old friends, including Hannay, will have taken up arms again.

== See also ==
- Edward Leithen
