= Frances Grey (actress) =

Scottish actress

- Born: 1970 (age 55–56); Edinburgh, Scotland
- Education: Goldsmiths, University of London; London Academy of Music and Dramatic Art
- Occupation: Actress
- Spouse: Nick Powell (m. 2005–2011)

Frances Grey (born 1970 in Edinburgh) is a Scottish actress, perhaps most well known for her portrayal of D.S. Kate Beauchamp in the BBC television series Messiah (2001). The original production was based on a novel by Boris Starling. Grey also starred in the subsequent installments Messiah 2: Vengeance is Mine (2003) and Messiah 3: the Promise (2004) which were written directly for television.

== Early life ==
She attended The Mary Erskine School in Edinburgh, graduated from Goldsmiths, University of London with a degree in English and drama. Frances then went on to study at the London Academy of Music and Dramatic Art.

== Career ==
Some of her earlier roles were as Jane in the film Crimetime (1996), as Jenny Roach in the TV series Accused (1996), as Dr. Davies in the TV documentary series Living Proof (1997), as Amelia Sedley in the 1998 BBC adaptation of Vanity Fair. as Violet in the film Janice Beard 45 WPM,.(1999) as Jackie Brett in the TV series Reach for the Moon (2000) and as Elaine in the TV series The Secret World of Michael Fry (2000).

She also played as Lucy Slater in the TV series Murder in Mind (2002), as Jessie in the TV series The Key (2003), as Ellie Peters in the TV series The Bill (2005), as Caroline Jensen in the TV series Sea of Souls (2006), as Hannah in the TV series Where the Heart is (2006), as Suzanne in the play Monks by Des Dillon in Edinburgh in 2007, as Louise Whately and Liz Beamish in the TV soap Casualty (2005 and 2008), as Janice Hylton in the TV series Foyle's War (2008) as Caroline Page and Rhona Campbell in the Scottish TV series Taggart (1997 and 2008) and as prison psychiatrist Marianne McKee in BBC Scotland's TV soap-opera River City (2009).

Grey played as Mary Place in the TV series Garrow's Law (2009), as Samantha Jackson in the short film Downturn (2010), as Sonia Thomas and Natalie Layfield in the TV series Doctors (2007 and 2011), as Janice in the TV film in three parts The Widower (2014), as Jess Collins in the TV detective series Shetland (2014), as Slan Gleeson in the TV medical soap Holby City (2014) and as Al Ferguson in the short film Perfect State (2014). In 2014 she was filming the TV series Home Fires. In 2021 she played Hilary Rhodes in one episode of Sister Boniface Mysteries

== Personal life ==
She was married to Nick Powell from 2005 to 2011. She has one child with playwright John Donnelly.

== Filmography ==
=== Film ===
Year	Title	Role	Notes
1996	Crimetime	Jane	
1999	Janice Beard	Violet	
2010	Downturn	Samantha Jackson	Short film
2014	Perfect State	Ali Ferguson	Short film
2022	The Road Dance	Aileen MacAuley	
2022	When She Was Good	Florence	Short film

=== Television ===
Year	Title	Role	Notes
1996	Accused	Jenny Roach	Recurring role; 4 episodes
1997	Q.E.D.	Dr. Davies	Episode: "Cause of Death"
1997	Taggart	Caroline Page	Episode: "Babushka Part One"
1998	Vanity Fair	Amelia Sedley	Series regular; 6 episodes
2000	Reach for the Moon	Jackie Brett	Series regular; 6 episodes
2000	The Secret World of Michael Fry	Elaine	Mini-series
2001–2004	Messiah	Kate Beauchamp	Recurring role; 6 episodes
2002	Murder in Mind	Lucy Slater	Episode: "Victim"
2003	The Key	Jessie	Mini-series
2005	The Bill	Ellie Peters	Episode: "A Social Decision"
2005	Casualty	Louise Whatley	Episode: "For Better or Worse"
2006	Sea of Souls	Caroline Jenson	Episode: "Insiders"
2006	Where the Heart Is	Hannah	Episode: "Don't Look Back in Anger"
2007	Doctors	Sonia Thomas	Episode: "A Secure Relationship"
2008	Foyle's War	Janice Hylton	Episode: "All Clear"
2008	Taggart	Rhona Campbell	Episode: "A Study in Murder"
2008	Casualty	Liz Beamish	Episode: "Face the World"
2009	River City	Marianne McKee	2 episodes
2009	Garrow's Law	Mary Pace	1 episode
2011	Case Histories	Michelle Fletcher	2 episodes
2011	Doctors	Natalie Layfield	Episode: "The Cradle Rocks"
2014	The Widower	Janice	Mini-series
2014	Shetland	Jess Collins	Episode: "Raven Black"
2014	Holby City	Sian Gleeson	Episode: "Collateral"
2015–2016	Home Fires	Erica Campbell	Series regular; 12 episodes
2016	Casualty	Gaynor Lockford	2 episodes
2017	Midsomer Murders	Cilia Troughton	Episode: "Last Man Out"
2018	Doctors	Hayley Brown	Episode: "Hello Darkness, My Old Friend"
2018	Ordeal by Innocence	Lydia Gould	Mini-series
2019	15 Days	Moira	Mini-series
2019	Traces	DCI Catherine Attwood	2 episodes
2020	Van der Valk	Claudia Oosterhuis	Episode: "Love in Amsterdam"
2020	Unprecedented	Siobhan	1 episode
2022	Vera	Olivia Parmer	Episode: "Vital Signs"
2022	Sister Boniface Mysteries	Hilary Rhodes	Episode: "Queen of the Kitchen"
2022	Bloods	Clare	Recurring role; 4 episodes
2023	Six Four	Pauline Wallace	Miniseries; 3 episodes
2023	Tom Jones	Mrs. Miller	Miniseries; 2 episodes

== Radio ==
Date	Title	Role	Director	Station
31 October 1999	Moliere, or the League of Hypocrites	Armande	Don Taylor	BBC Radio 4
11 June 2004	Soft Fall the Sounds of Eden	Susan	Gaynor Macfarlane	BBC Radio 4 Friday Play
1 April 2006	Look Back in Anger	Helena Charles		BBC Radio 4 Saturday Play
20 October 2006	3 Days that Shook the World	Irina	John Dryden	BBC Radio 4 Afternoon Play
4 April 2011	My Life is a Series of People Saying Goodbye	Sarah	Polly Thomas	BBC Radio 4 Afternoon Play
13 August 2012 – 17 August 2012	The Other One	Mum	Kirsty Williams	BBC Radio 4 Woman's Hour Drama

== Theatre credits ==
Year	Title	Role	Venue
1995	The Importance of Being Earnest	Cecily Cardew	The Old Vic, London
1997	Rebecca	Second Mrs de Winter	Lyceum Theatre, Edinburgh
2001	Platonov	Sasha Ivanovna	Almeida Theatre, London
2003	Playhouse Creatures	Mrs. Marshall	West Yorkshire Playhouse, Leeds
2003	Dark Earth	Valerie	Traverse Theatre, Edinburgh
2005	Pyrenees	Anna	Tron Theatre, Glasgow & Menier Chocolate Factory, London
2007	Monks	Suzanne	Lyceum Theatre, Edinburgh
2008	Relocated	Wife	Royal Court Theatre, London
2008	Twilight of the Gods	Jane	Paines Plough at Village Unerground, London
2010	The Furies	Jamie	UK Tour
2010	Land of the Dead/Helter Skelter	Woman	UK Tour
2010	Caledonia	Mrs. Paterson	Eden Court Theatre, Inverness & King's Theatre, Edinburgh
2011	Somersaults	Alison	Traverse Theatre, Edinburgh & Citizens Theatre, Glasgow
2011	Dear Uncle	Helena	Stephen Joseph Theatre, Scarborough & International Tour
2011	Neighbourhood Watch	Amy	Stephen Joseph Theatre, Scarborough & UK Tour
2017	The Winter's Tale	Hermione	Lyceum Theatre, Edinburgh
2018	Old Fools	Vivienne	Southwark Playhouse, London
2022–2023	Harry Potter and the Cursed Child	Ginny Potter	Palace Theatre
