= Paradox (British TV series) =

British science fiction police television series

- Genre: Sci-fi crime drama
- Created by: Lizzie Mickery
- Directed by: Simon Cellan Jones; Omar Madha
- Starring: Tamzin Outhwaite; Mark Bonnar; Emun Elliott; Chiké Okonkwo
- Country of origin: United Kingdom
- Original language: English
- No. of series: 1
- No. of episodes: 5

Production
- Executive producers: Murray Ferguson; Patrick Spence
- Producer: Marcus Wilson
- Production locations: Manchester, England
- Production company: Clerkenwell Films

Original release
- Network: BBC One, BBC HD
- Release: 24 November – 22 December 2009

Paradox is a 2009 British science fiction police drama, starring Tamzin Outhwaite as Detective Inspector Rebecca Flint. Written by Lizzie Mickery and produced by Clerkenwell Films for the BBC, it was filmed and set in Manchester, England.

Flint heads a police team played by Mark Bonnar and Chiké Okonkwo, working with a scientist played by Emun Elliott, as they attempt to prevent disasters foretold by images being sent from the future.

The series aired on BBC One and BBC HD during November and December 2009. It received mostly negative reviews from critics, and it was not renewed for a second season.

== Synopsis ==
Detective Inspector Rebecca Flint (Tamzin Outhwaite), Detective Sergeant Ben Holt (Mark Bonnar) and Detective Constable Callum Gada (Chiké Okonkwo) investigate images being broadcast to an eminent astrophysicist Dr Christian King's (Emun Elliott) laboratory, which appear to show catastrophic events in the future.

== Production ==
Murray Ferguson, chief executive of Clerkenwell Films, said that they were looking for something "different from the traditional formula of investigating a crime that has already taken place" and premise for the series, the police having knowledge of future incidents, was developed. Lizzie Mickery (The 39 Steps, The State Within) was chosen to write the series. She said she has "always been interested in the decisions you're not aware you are making". The series was based on the "moral and emotional implications of having the ability to change the future". The series was then commissioned by Ben Stephenson and Jay Hunt for BBC One with executive producers Patrick Spence, for BBC Northern Ireland, and Ferguson. The series was produced by Marcus Wilson and directed by Simon Cellan Jones and Omar Madha. Filming began in Greater Manchester, England in June 2009, with the majority of filming in the Northern Quarter district of the City of Manchester. The Imperial War Museum North is used as the backdrop for Dr King's place of employment, Prometheus Labs.

Filming was completed over 13 weeks and Fergison said: "Each episode is set within a very short time period so the changeable weather caused havoc."

=== Cancellation ===
On 25 February 2010, David Bentley of the Coventry Telegraph writing in their Geek Files blog, quoted an unnamed BBC spokesman: "In spite of a great cast and production team, Paradox did not find its audience in the way that we had hoped".

== Episodes ==
No.	Title	Directed by	Written by	Original release date	UK viewers (millions)
1	"Episode 1"	Simon Cellan Jones	Lizzie Mickery	24 November 2009	4.81 million
Astrophysicist Christian King receives multiple ambiguous images ostensibly referencing a looming catastrophe. DI Rebecca Flint is called in to investigate. Can a disaster be averted?
2	"Episode 2"	Simon Cellan Jones	Lizzie Mickery	1 December 2009	2.94 million
Still reeling from events of the previous day, the group attempts to piece together new clues and prevent a tragedy, with DI Flint unaware of potentially devastating personal consequences.
3	"Episode 3"	Simon Cellan Jones	Lizzie Mickery	8 December 2009	3.32 million
4	"Episode 4"	Omar Madha	Mark Greig	15 December 2009	3.12 million
5	"Episode 5"	Omar Madha	Lizzie Mickery	22 December 2009	3.11 million
The series finale finds a disillusioned Dr. King working with the team to prevent an attack that will have dire consequences for each team member. Consequences of prior failures result in multiple moral dilemmas. Who will live, and who will die?

== Reception ==
The series peaked at 4.81 million viewers for the first episode.

In The Daily Telegraph, James Walton said that despite the "exciting" climactic scenes, "[s]adly, by then the show's complete absence of internal logic (or, if you prefer, its overwhelming silliness) meant that it was beyond help." Comparing with American series FlashForward and ITV1's Collision, Alex Hardy from The Times said that the former "is currently doing a much better job at such space-time contemplation" and that the "'working back from an accident' format unfolded much more deliciously" in the latter. Following the second episode, The Times' Andrew Billen said that although the last 10 minutes were exciting, "[t]he difficulty lay in the 50 minutes of scratchy dialogue, robotic acting and general misery that it took to get there." Jeremy Clay from the Leicester Mercury also liked the climax but said "the rest was utterly daft", the programme tried the patience of The Observer's Phil Hogan and Tom Sutcliffe from The Independent said that "the Prometheus Innovation Satellite Downlink offers a perfect acronym for the state you'd have to be in to take this kind of thing seriously".
