= 15 Days =

15 Days may refer to:

- 15 Days (video game)
- 15 Days (TV series)
