= The 39 Steps (2008 film) =

2008 television film directed by James Hawes

- Title card
- Genre: Conspiracy thriller
- Based on: The Thirty-Nine Steps by John Buchan
- Screenplay by: Lizzie Mickery
- Directed by: James Hawes
- Starring: Rupert Penry-Jones; Lydia Leonard; David Haig; Eddie Marsan; Patrick Malahide
- Composer: Rob Lane
- Country of origin: United Kingdom
- Original language: English

Production
- Producer: Lynn Horsford
- Cinematography: James Aspinall
- Editor: Tania Reddin
- Running time: 86 minutes
- Production company: BBC

Original release
- Network: BBC One, BBC HD
- Release: 28 December 2008

The 39 Steps is a 2008 British television adventure film, an adaptation of the 1915 John Buchan novel The Thirty-Nine Steps produced by the BBC. It was written by Lizzie Mickery, directed by James Hawes, and filmed on location in Scotland, starring Rupert Penry-Jones, Lydia Leonard, David Haig, Eddie Marsan, and Patrick Malahide. Following three screen versions of the novel and the 1952 and 1977 television adaptations of The Three Hostages, Penry-Jones became the sixth actor to portray Hannay on screen. This adaptation is set on the eve of the First World War and sees mining engineer Richard Hannay caught up in an espionage conspiracy following the death of a British spy in his flat.

The single drama was first shown on BBC One and BBC HD on 28 December 2008 as part of BBC One's Christmas 2008 line-up, and it was the most watched programme of the day. Compared to Alfred Hitchcock's 1935 film, it received mostly negative reviews from the press. The production was criticised for its historical inaccuracies, particularly its use of anachronistic props.

== Plot ==
The story starts on 28 June 1914; Richard Hannay, a mining engineer and an intelligence officer during the Second Boer War, is in London after his recent return from Africa, but he finds England "cliquey", "class-bound" and "deathly, deathly dull". Evading German spies, a man named Scudder pushes into Hannay's flat and reveals himself to be a betrayed freelance British Secret Service Bureau agent, who has been on the trail of a German espionage ring with headquarters in Scotland. He has heard rumours of a plot to assassinate a high-ranking European royal, which could lead to war. Believing he will soon be killed, he hands Hannay a notebook to pass to Captain Kell of the Secret Service. While Hannay answers the door, Scudder is shot by one of the German spies who has entered the flat via a back door. The police arrive; Hannay is arrested for murder, but escapes.

Unable to contact Kell, Hannay goes through the notebook, finding it contains pages of code using Roman numerals. He finds a map in the back and takes a train to Scotland to prove Scudder right, attempting to decipher the code en route. He learns that Archduke Ferdinand of Austria-Hungary has been assassinated. Hannay reaches Scotland and leaves the train to escape the police. He stays in a barn overnight, where he deciphers the code in the notebook (except a section in double code), which reveals the Germans want to destroy the Royal Navy so that they could invade Britain. Chased by the police, the Germans and machine-gun-fire from a biplane, he encounters brother and sister Harry and Victoria Sinclair, a prospective Member of Parliament and a suffragette respectively, who believe him to be a Liberal spokesman there for a political rally in a nearby town. There, Hannay meets Sir George Sinclair, Harry and Victoria's uncle. Victoria aids Hannay's attempt to escape, before they are captured by the Germans. With the notebook missing from Hannay's pocket, they are taken to Longkeep Castle, the headquarters of the German espionage ring, where they are imprisoned by Professor Fisher. Sir George arrives as they are captured and inquires about them while they are held in another room. After he leaves they are bound and gagged and placed in the cellar. They escape and return to where they were captured to look for the notebook, which Victoria reveals she had picked from Hannay's pocket and hidden. They stay overnight in an inn, where Hannay details the contents of the notebook to Victoria.

In the morning, they escape to Harry's house, where Victoria unsuccessfully attempts to contact Captain Kell. Hannay, alone, meets with Sir George, who sits on the government's defence committee. Hannay reveals the contents of the notebook, leading to Sir George disclosing that a meeting of the committee is being held the next day at Stirling Castle to unveil new naval plans, matching part of the double code. Later, Hannay and Victoria kiss, and the next morning he sees her leaving with a man, whom he recalls seeing previously on the train and at the rally. With the notebook missing and finding out that Victoria disconnected the call she made to the Secret Service Bureau before it was connected, Hannay goes to Stirling Castle, believing Victoria to be a traitor. There, Victoria reveals she works for the Secret Service Bureau and he meets Kell and Wakeham, the man Victoria left with earlier, who reveal they used Hannay to distract the Germans and sent Victoria to keep an eye on him. Hannay deduces that Sir George is the traitor, as he should have heard them when he was at Fisher's House, and, with his photographic memory, has escaped with the naval plans memorised. To identify his rendezvous point with the Germans, they crack the remaining code, referring to the room they were previously imprisoned in at Longkeep Castle, and discover "39 steps" written in the notebook by Scudder using invisible ink. At the castle, Hannay and Victoria find 39 steps leading to a loch. A shoot-out ensues, and a German U-boat surfaces in the loch. Fisher, the Germans and Sir George fail to get to the U-boat before it submerges, and surrender.

Together by the loch, Hannay and Victoria kiss before she is hit by a bullet fired by a surviving gunman, falls into the loch and disappears. The story concludes four months later, after the start of World War I, when Hannay, in an army officer's uniform, is waiting to meet someone at St Pancras railway station. Harry appears, saying that Victoria wanted to say goodbye, and Hannay sees her in the distance. Harry tells him, "top secret, old man." Victoria disappears behind a luggage trolley and Harry tells Hannay that she will see him after the war.

== Cast ==
- Rupert Penry-Jones as Richard Hannay
- Lydia Leonard as Victoria Sinclair
- David Haig as Sir George Sinclair
- Patrick Malahide as Professor Fisher
- Patrick Kennedy as Harry Sinclair
- Eddie Marsan as Scudder
- Alex Jennings as Captain Kell
- Steven Elder as Vicar / Wakeham
- Werner Daehn as Ackerman
- Peter Stark as Engel
- Sean Kane as London police constable
- Del Synnott as London police constable
- Roger De Courcey as Ventriloquist
- David Gallacher as Professor's butler
- James Bryce as Concierge at Club
- Stewart Preston as Waiter at Club

== Production ==
=== Development ===
Announced by the BBC in August 2008, filming began in September 2008 for a first broadcast at Christmas. Penry-Jones, who had previously worked on the spy drama Spooks, took the lead role, with the screenplay written by Lizzie Mickery (co-writer of the dramas The State Within and Messiah), produced by Lynn Horsford (Boy A, The Mark of Cain) and directed by James Hawes (Fanny Hill, Merlin, Doctor Who). Penry-Jones became the fifth actor to play Hannay on screen, preceded by Robert Donat, Kenneth More, Barry Foster, and Robert Powell.

=== Writing ===
At the time of the announcement, Horsford said: "With this adaptation we wanted to stay faithful to the spirit and period of the book, but asked the writer Lizzie to feel free to re-imagine it for a modern audience more familiar with James Bond and Jason Bourne." The production was set around the eve of the First World War and retained other elements from the book, including having the 39 steps refer to steps to a departure point, but according to The Times' thriller critic it has "a style that gives more than a nod to the grittier James Bond of Daniel Craig". A piece in The Observer stated that Mickery was "braced for complaints this Christmas from fans of previous screen portrayals", after basing her plot on the original book rather than the films. Differences from the book include the introduction of romance for Hannay, through suffragette and spy Victoria Sinclair, played by Lydia Leonard, and, according to Serena Davies of The Daily Telegraph, "a plot with so many twists and turns you almost need a degree in espionage to follow it".

=== Casting ===
Penry-Jones read the book and saw the other versions of the film, but said that Hitchcock's 1959 film North by Northwest was "more of a template for me than any version of The 39 Steps". Explaining why he took on the part, he said to Tim Oglethorpe of the Daily Record:

Part of the appeal was the cars, I'm a bit of a buff ... And I said – jokingly, of course – that I wouldn't be in The 39 Steps unless the action included the famous chase scene in which Hannay is pursued by a biplane. I've always wanted to be chased by a plane like Cary Grant in the movie North by Northwest and I was just delighted when it happened in our version of Steps.

=== Locations ===
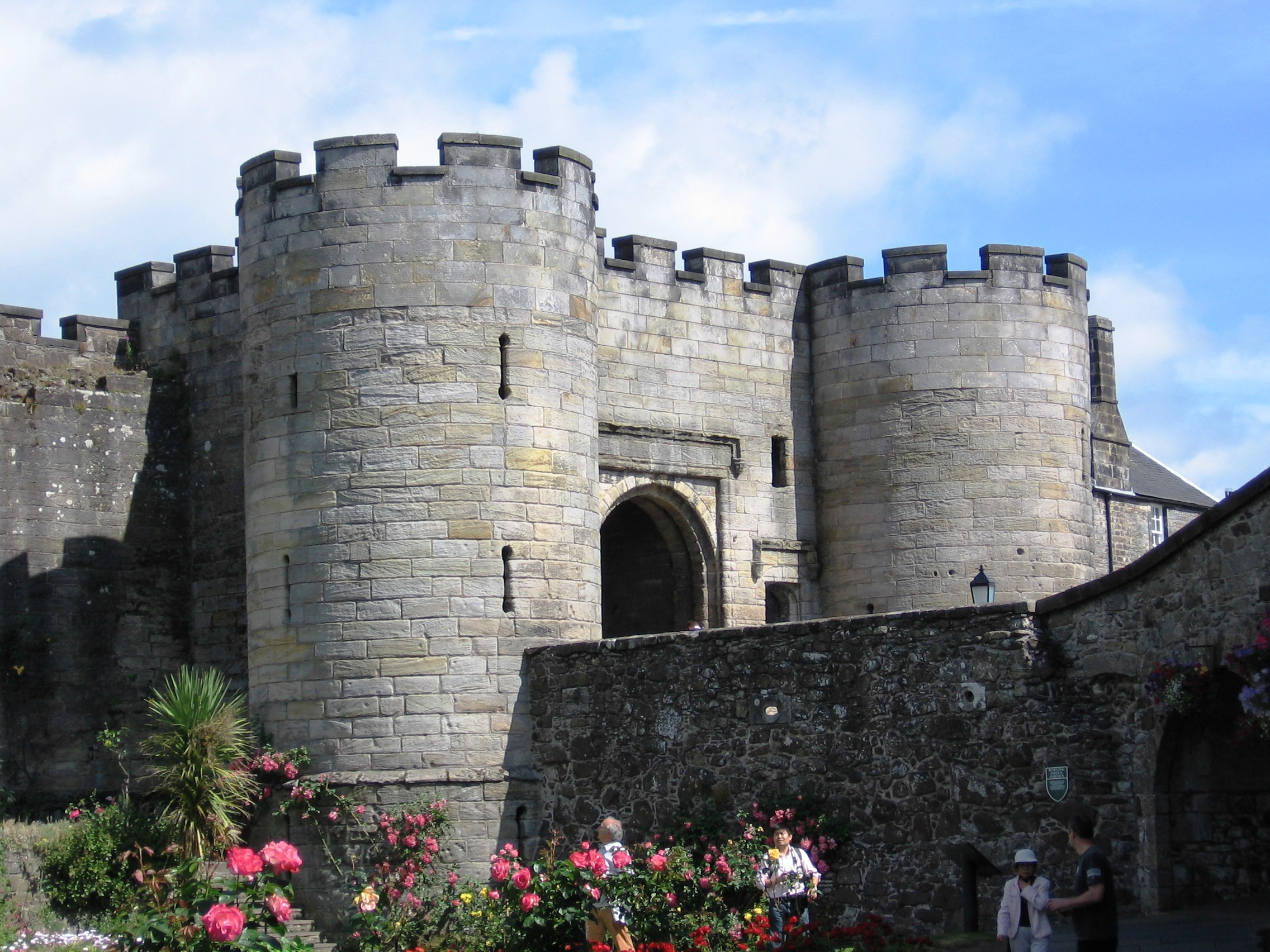
The main gate at Stirling Castle, one of the locations used for the production and the setting for a pivotal scene.

Filming took place on location in Scotland. Locations used included the area around West Register Street in Edinburgh for the London scenes at the start of the film, Bo'ness railway station, Kelvingrove Art Gallery and Museum for the interior scenes of St Pancras railway station, Glasgow City Chambers, Culross, Stirling Castle, Dumbarton Castle, the highlands of Argyll, and Loch Katrine for the final confrontation.

=== Filming ===
The production was shot using 35mm film rather than high-definition cameras. Hawes told Matthew Bell of Broadcast that:

Film is absolutely right for this project. It has scale, big exterior locations and that's something that still challenges HD .... The HD cameras available to us on our budget are still vulnerable in difficult weather conditions [encountered during filming]. There's no doubt that what we've got on 35mm is just so much more detailed. It has so much more depth of field and richness than we could have got on HD.

=== Historical inaccuracies ===
Hannay (Penry-Jones) being chased by a 1916 biplane in a promotional image from the production. Penry-Jones was "delighted" that the scene was included, but it drew criticism and viewer complaints for its historical inaccuracy.

Some artistic licence was used to find the appropriate props. Cars used included a 1924 Morris Oxford, a 1926 Darracq, and a 1927 Wolseley, previously used in the 1960s series Dr Finlay's Casebook. Willie Bennie, who sourced the vehicles, told the Daily Record:

I knew they were wanting to include car chases to make the drama much more exciting to watch. The only trouble was that the cars around this era weren't very fast.

The biplane that chased Hannay was a 1916 Royal Aircraft Factory S.E.5a and his apartment is shown as being in a 1920s-style Art Deco building. Other minor mistakes included an anachronistic colour scheme for the British Railway carriages, and the appearance of a Philips 78 gramophone despite the company not being established until 1950.

Ben Stephenson, Head of Drama Commissioning at the BBC, told The Daily Telegraph in reply to complaints about the inaccuracies:

The question is: for the seven million people who watched it, did it feel authentic, did it create a sense of period? ...We were creating a realistic world within a world – a world of damsels and heroes and a huge amount of excitement. That, for me, is the priority. Did it create that world? It absolutely did. That's not to say that we don't work increasingly hard to get everything right. But it's hard to get all the details right when it's a 21st century drama, never mind anything earlier.

== Broadcast ==
The adaptation was originally planned to be broadcast on BBC One on Boxing Day, but was later moved to a Sunday night slot on 28 December. It was simulcast in high-definition on BBC HD. In the United States, the adaption aired during Masterpiece Classic on PBS on 28 February 2010.

== Reception ==
Overnight viewing figures estimated that the programme was seen by 7.3 million viewers (28% audience share) on 28 December 2008, against a Top Gear: Vietnam Special on BBC Two. It was the most watched programme of the day.

The adaptation received mostly negative reviews from the press, believing it did not match up to Hitchcock's 1935 film version (as predicted by Mickery). Sam Wollaston of The Guardian felt that the romance scene between Hannay and Victoria (when they stay overnight in an inn) was "one of the silliest ever" and felt that after the final scene at the loch and the concluding scene: "It's all very silly .... It doesn't have the pace, the moodiness or the wit." Damien Love of Sunday Herald felt the "tepid pace" was set by the casting of Penry-Jones, and that he "has a style reminiscent of the young Roger Moore, but without the vital, animating spark of self-deprecation. As Hannay, Penry-Jones is not at his best, and more reminiscent of a well-stuffed armchair on wheels." Mick Hume of The Times said "The overall effect was to turn Buchan's blood and thunder tale into a pallid politically correct Enid Blyton story", and The Independent 's Robert Hanks concluded his review by saying that "By the end, my impression was that several pages of the plot must have been eaten by a dog, or a bored actor, and the director had decided, sod it, nobody's going to keep watching this long. Which I wouldn't have if I wasn't being paid."

The adaptation did receive some positive comments however. In The Sunday Times, A. A. Gill praised Penry-Jones and said that it was "racily paced" and was "the closest to the original [the book] and by far and away the most convincing". Roz Laws of the Sunday Mercury also commented on Penry-Jones, saying that he "proved to be just as good a spy in 1914 as he was in Spooks, only more dashing" and Alison Graham of the Radio Times, in her 'pick of the day' piece, said that Penry-Jones is "just perfect as John Buchan's hero" and commented that Victoria (Leonard) was "a splendid suffragette". Alasdair McKay of The Herald said "it was all rather spiffing and well-mannered".

== Home media ==
The adaptation was released on Region 2 DVD on 2 February 2009, and Region 1 DVD on 2 March 2010.

== Sequels ==
Penry-Jones said prior to broadcast that, depending on the reception, "They'd like to do more if they can. I definitely would."
