= Reach for the Moon =

2000 British television series

- Genre: Romantic drama
- Created by: Matthew Graham
- Written by: Matthew Graham; Michael Wynne; Christopher Lang
- Directed by: Richard Laxton; Joanna Hogg; Richard Signy; Rob Evans
- Starring: Jonathan Kerrigan; Saira Todd; Lynda Bellingham; Ben Miles; Frances Grey; Peter McEnery; Matt Bardock; Lucy Cohu; Richard Hope; Bob Mason
- Composer: Roger Jackson
- Country of origin: United Kingdom
- Original language: English
- No. of series: 1
- No. of episodes: 6

Production
- Executive producer: Jo Wright
- Producer: Lis Steele
- Production locations: Newport, Isle of Wight, England, UK
- Running time: 50 minutes (eps. 1–5); 100 minutes (ep. 6)
- Production company: LWT

Original release
- Network: ITV
- Release: 11 February – 17 March 2000

Reach for the Moon is a British romantic drama miniseries that created by Matthew Graham, first broadcast on ITV and aired between 11 February and 17 March 2000 comprising five fifty-minute episodes and one one-hundred minute episode for every Friday nights at 9:00pm. This programme was produced by LWT for the ITV network.

== Plot ==
The series that took us to the Isle of Wight, were about to be married teacher Paul Martin (Jonathan Kerrigan) has his life thrown into confusion by the arrival of his former fiancée Annie Bowman (Saria Todd), after being away ten years to teach at his school.

== Cast ==
- Jonathan Kerrigan as Paul Martin
- Saira Todd as Annie Bowman
- Lynda Bellingham as Penny Martin
- Ben Miles as Richard Martin
- Frances Grey as Jackie Brett
- Peter McEnery as William Martin
- Matt Bardock as Frank Sawyer
- Lucy Cohu as Amelia Marchant
- Richard Hope as Lawrence Fenton
- Bob Mason as Timothy Marble

== Episodes ==
| No. | Title | Directed by | Written by | Original release date | Viewers (millions) |
|---|---|---|---|---|---|
| 1 | "This Means Nothing to Me" | Richard Laxton | Matthew Graham | 11 February 2000 | 7.31 |
A teacher's wedding plans go awry when his teenage sweetheart arrives back on the scene after ten years living abroad, only to start teaching at the same school as him.
| 2 | "Slow, Slow, Quick, Quick, Slow" | Joanna Hogg | Matthew Graham | 18 February 2000 | 6.87 |
TBA.
| 3 | "I'm a Rocketman" | Joanna Hogg | Matthew Graham | 25 February 2000 | 6.77 |
Jackie is impressed by Paul's stoical response to the postponement of their wedding.
| 4 | "One Small Step" | Joanna Hogg | Michael Wynne | 3 March 2000 | 5.74 |
TBA.
| 5 | "To Boldly Go" | Richard Signy | Michael Wynne | 10 March 2000 | 5.84 |
Pupil Nick Hunt helps out his brother Kyle with his studies and sticks up for him when people tease him. Although withdrawn, Nick catches the eye of school heart-throb Kelly, who is impressed by the way he stands up for his brother. Meanwhile, Annie's ex-boyfriend Ben turns up in a flashy sports car and with an ulterior motive, but Annie is still not over Paul and worries that Ben will confuse matters even further.
| 6 | "Houston, We Have a Problem" | Rob Evans | Christopher Lang | 17 March 2000 | 5.62 |
TBA.

== Home media ==
The series was released on VHS on 7 April 2000 by VCI, but has never been issued on DVD in the United Kingdom.
