= The 39 Steps (1935 film) =

Film by Alfred Hitchcock

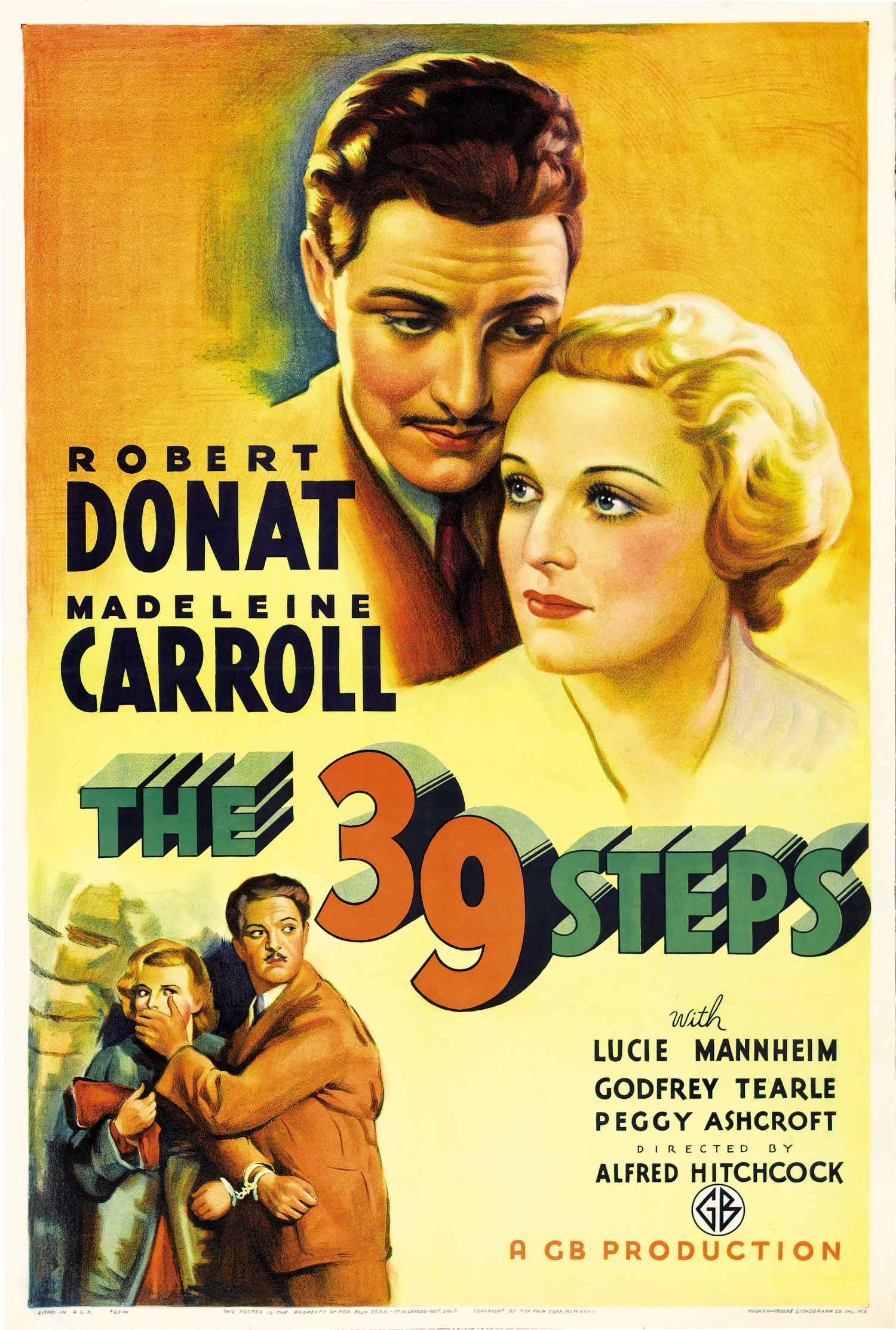
- Theatrical release poster
- Directed by: Alfred Hitchcock
- Screenplay by: Charles Bennett; Ian Hay
- Based on: The Thirty-Nine Steps; 1915 novel by John Buchan
- Produced by: Michael Balcon
- Starring: Robert Donat; Madeleine Carroll; Lucie Mannheim; Godfrey Tearle
- Cinematography: Bernard Knowles
- Edited by: Derek N. Twist
- Music by: Louis Levy; Jack Beaver (uncredited)
- Production company: Gaumont-British Picture Corporation
- Distributed by: Gaumont British Distributors
- Release date: 6 June 1935 (London)
- Running time: 86 minutes
- Country: United Kingdom
- Language: English
- Budget: £50,000

The 39 Steps is a 1935 British spy thriller film directed by Alfred Hitchcock, starring Robert Donat and Madeleine Carroll. It is loosely based on the 1915 novel The Thirty-Nine Steps by John Buchan. It concerns a Canadian civilian in London, Richard Hannay, who becomes caught up in preventing an organisation of spies called "The 39 Steps" from stealing British military secrets. Mistakenly accused of the murder of a counter-espionage agent, Hannay goes on the run to Scotland and becomes tangled up with an attractive woman, Pamela, while hoping to stop the spy ring and clear his name.

Since its release, the film has been widely acknowledged as a classic. The film maker and actor Orson Welles referred to it as a "masterpiece". The screenwriter Robert Towne remarked, "It's not much of an exaggeration to say that all contemporary escapist entertainment begins with The 39 Steps."

== Plot ==
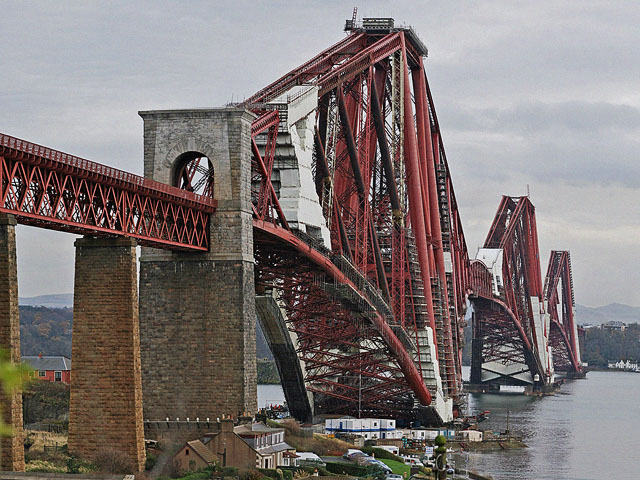
Forth Bridge in 2007

At a London music hall theatre, Richard Hannay is watching "Mr. Memory" demonstrate his powers of fact recall by answering trivia questions from the audience, when gunshots are heard. In the ensuing panic, Hannay finds himself holding a seemingly frightened woman who persuades him to take her back to his flat. She tells him her name is Annabella Smith, she is a spy and she fired the shots to create a diversion so she could elude assassins. She claims that she has uncovered a plot to steal vital British military information, masterminded by a man missing the top joint of one finger. She mentions "The 39 Steps", but does not explain the phrase.

Later that night, Smith bursts into Hannay's bedroom and warns him to flee, before dying from a knife in her back. Hannay finds a map of the Scottish Highlands clutched in her hand, showing the area around Killin, with a building named "Alt-na-Shellach" circled. He sneaks out of his flat disguised as a milkman to avoid the waiting assassins and boards the Flying Scotsman to Scotland. At Waverley Station in Edinburgh, he learns he is the target of a nationwide manhunt for Smith's murderer. When he sees police searching the train, he goes to another compartment and kisses the sole occupant, Pamela, to try to avoid capture; however, she alerts the policemen, who stop the train on the Forth Bridge. Hannay escapes.

Making his way north, he stays the night with a crofter and his much younger wife, Margaret. Early the next morning, Margaret sees the headlights of a police car approaching and wakes Hannay; before he flees, she gives him her husband's coat. The police chase after him, even employing an autogyro, but he eludes them.

He eventually reaches Alt-na-Shellach, the house of Professor Jordan, where a party is going on. Jordan hides him from the police. He listens to Hannay's story. When Hannay states that the leader of the spies is missing the top joint of the little finger of his left hand, Jordan shows his right hand, which is missing that joint. He offers Hannay the opportunity to kill himself, then shoots him and leaves him for dead, but the bullet is stopped by a hymnary in the crofter's coat.

Hannay goes to the sheriff. The sheriff does not believe him, since Jordan is his best friend. Hannay escapes through a window. Hiding at a political meeting, he is mistaken for the introductory speaker. He gives a rousing impromptu speech, but Pamela, attending the rally, gives him away to the police once more. He is taken away; the policemen insist Pamela accompany them. When they pass the local police station, they say they are going to Inveraray, 40 miles away. Hannay realises they are agents of the conspiracy. When the men get out to disperse some sheep blocking the road, they handcuff Pamela to Hannay. Hannay escapes, dragging Pamela with him.

They make their way across the countryside and stay the night at an inn. While Hannay sleeps, Pamela manages to slip out of the handcuffs, but overhears one of the fake policemen on the telephone, confirming Hannay's story. She returns to the room. The next morning, she tells him that she overheard the spies saying that Jordan will be picking something up at the London Palladium. He sends her to alert the police, but no secret documents have been reported missing, so they do not believe her. Instead they tail her, hoping that she will lead them to Hannay.

She goes to the Palladium. When Mr. Memory is introduced, Hannay recognises his theme music — a catchy tune he has been unable to forget. Hannay, upon seeing Jordan signal Mr. Memory, realises that Mr. Memory has memorised the secrets. As the police are about to take Hannay away, he shouts, "What are The 39 Steps?" Mr. Memory compulsively answers, "The 39 Steps is an organisation of spies, collecting information on behalf of the foreign office of ...", at which point Jordan shoots Mr. Memory before being apprehended. A dying Mr. Memory recites the design for a silent aircraft engine. Hannay slips his hand into Pamela's and is not rebuffed.

== Cast ==
- Robert Donat as Richard Hannay
- Madeleine Carroll as Pamela
- Lucie Mannheim as Annabella Smith
- Godfrey Tearle as Professor Jordan
- Peggy Ashcroft as Margaret, the crofter's wife
- John Laurie as John, the crofter
- Helen Haye as Mrs. Louisa Jordan, the professor's wife
- Frank Cellier as Sheriff Watson
- Wylie Watson as "Mr. Memory"
- Gus McNaughton as commercial traveller
- Jerry Verno as commercial traveller
- Peggy Simpson as maid
- Matthew Boulton as fake policeman (uncredited)

== Production ==
=== Adaptation ===
The script was originally written by Charles Bennett, who prepared the initial treatment in close collaboration with Hitchcock; Ian Hay then wrote some dialogue.

The film's plot departs significantly from John Buchan's novel; scenes such as those in the music hall and on the Forth Bridge are absent from the book. The character "Mr. Memory" was based on a real entertainer, Datas. Hitchcock also introduced the two major female characters, Annabella the spy and Pamela, the reluctant companion. In this film, The 39 Steps refers to the clandestine organisation, whereas in the book and the other film versions it refers to physical steps, with the German spies being called "The Black Stone". By having Annabella tell Hannay she is travelling to meet a man in Scotland (and produce a map with Alt-na-Shellach house circled) Hitchcock avoids the coincidence in Buchan's novel where Hannay, with the whole country in which to hide, chances to walk into the one house where the spy ringleader lives.

=== Conception ===
The 39 Steps was a major British film of its time. The production company, Gaumont-British, was eager to establish its films in international markets and especially in the United States, and The 39 Steps was conceived as a prime vehicle towards this end. Where Hitchcock's previous film, The Man Who Knew Too Much, had costs of £40,000, The 39 Steps cost nearly £60,000. Much of the extra money went to the star salaries for the leads, Robert Donat and Madeleine Carroll. Both had already made films in Hollywood and were therefore known to American audiences. At a time when British cinema had few international stars, this was considered vital to the film's success. Hitchcock had heard that the Scottish industrialist and aircraft pioneer James Weir commuted to work daily in an autogyro and worked the aircraft into the film.

=== Music ===
Hitchcock had worked with Jessie Matthews on the film Waltzes from Vienna and reportedly did not like her very much. Nevertheless he used the song "Tinkle, Tinkle, Tinkle" (from the film Evergreen which starred Matthews) as the music underscoring Mr. Memory's dying words and fade-out music in The 39 Steps. He also used an orchestrated version of her song "May I Have The Next Romance With You" in the ballroom sequence of his 1937 film Young and Innocent.

=== Hitchcockian elements ===
The 39 Steps is one in a line of Hitchcock films based upon an innocent man being forced to go on the run, including The Lodger (1927), Saboteur (1942) and North by Northwest (1959). The film contains a common Hitchcockian trope of a MacGuffin (a plot device which is vital to the story, but irrelevant to the audience); in this case, the designs for a secret silent aeroplane engine.

This film contains an Alfred Hitchcock cameo, a signature occurrence in most of his films. At around seven minutes into the film, both Hitchcock and the screenwriter Charles Bennett can be seen walking past a bus that Robert Donat and Lucie Mannheim board outside the music hall. The bus is on London Transport's number 25A route, which ran from Oxford Street through the East End and on to Ilford. As author Mark Glancy points out in his 2003 study of the film, this was familiar ground to Hitchcock, who lived in Leytonstone and then in Stepney (in the East End) as a youth. The director's appearance can thus be seen as an assertion of his connection with the area, but he was by no means romanticising it. As the bus pulls up he litters by throwing a cigarette packet on the ground. Hitchcock is also seen briefly as a member of the audience scrambling to leave the music hall after the shot is fired in the opening scene.

In the middle of the film Hannay is shot in the chest with a pistol at close range, and a long fade-out suggests that he has been killed. This jarringly unusual development—the main character is apparently killed while the story is still unfolding—anticipates Hitchcock's Psycho (1960), and the murder of Marion Crane in the Bates Motel. However, Hannay is not dead; in the next scene it is revealed that a hymn book in the pocket of his borrowed coat prevented the bullet from killing him.

The film established Madeleine Carroll as the template for Hitchcock's succession of ice-cold and elegant leading ladies – 'Hitchcock blondes'. Of Hitchcock's heroines as exemplified by Carroll, the film critic Roger Ebert wrote: "The female characters in his films reflected the same qualities over and over again: They were blonde. They were icy and remote. They were imprisoned in costumes that subtly combined fashion with fetishism. They mesmerised the men, who often had physical or psychological handicaps. Sooner or later, every Hitchcock woman was humiliated." In keeping with many of Hitchcock's films, key sequences are set in familiar locations; in this instance King's Cross station and a dramatic sequence on the Forth Bridge.

== Release and reception ==
Earl St John of Paramount said The 39 Steps was among the top six most popular films of 1935. Another account said it was the 17th-most-popular film at the British box office in 1935–36.

Contemporary reviews were positive. Andre Sennwald of The New York Times wrote: "If the work has any single rival as the most original, literate and entertaining melodrama of 1935, then it must be The Man Who Knew Too Much, which is also out of Mr. Hitchcock's workshop. A master of shock and suspense, of cold horror and slyly incongruous wit, he uses the camera the way a painter uses his brush, stylizing his story and giving it values which the scenarists could hardly have suspected." Variety wrote that "International spy stories are most always good, and this is one of the best, smartly cut, with sufficient comedy relief." The Monthly Film Bulletin declared it "First class entertainment", adding, "Like all melodramas in which the hero must win the story contains a number of very lucky accidents, but Hitchcock's direction, the speed at which the film moves, and Donat's high-spirited acting get away with them and the suspense never slackens." John Mosher of The New Yorker wrote "Speed, suspense, and surprises, all combine to make The 39 Steps one of those agreeable thrillers that can beguile the idle hour ... Mystery experts will enjoy the whole thing, I think."

Retrospective reviews seem to agree with the film's importance among the director's catalogue. Ethan Brehm of HiConsumption observed that Hitchcock "takes influence from Russian silents and German expressionism from the decade prior, but makes each frame his own canvas and has some early fun with POV here in the process."

It was voted the best British film of 1935 by The Examiner (a Tasmanian publication) in a public poll.

Of the four major film versions of the novel, Hitchcock's film has been the most highly praised. In 1999, the British Film Institute ranked it the fourth-best British film of the 20th century; in 2004, Total Film named it the 21st-greatest British movie ever made, and in 2011 ranked it the second-best book-to-film adaptation of all time. The Village Voice ranked The 39 Steps at number 112 in its Top 250 "Best Films of the Century" list in 1999, based on a poll of critics. In 2016, Empire ranked the film at No. 52 on its list of "The 100 best British films". In 2017, a poll of 150 actors, directors, writers, producers and critics for Time Out magazine saw it ranked the 13th-best British film ever. The 39 Steps was one of Orson Welles' favourite Hitchcock films and of it he said, "Oh my God, what a masterpiece." In 1939, Welles starred in a radio adaption of the same source novel with The Mercury Theatre on the Air.

The review aggregator website Rotten Tomatoes sampled 53 critics and judged 96% of the reviews positive, with an average rating of 8.9/10, stating the film is an "essential early Alfred Hitchcock feature [which] hints at the dazzling heights he'd reach later in his career." Metacritic, which uses a weighted average, assigned the film a score of 93 out of 100, based on 15 critics, indicating "universal acclaim". In 2017, The 39 Steps was included in the BFI's list of 100 essential thrillers. In 2021, The Daily Telegraph included the film on its unranked list of "The 100 best British films of all time". In 2022, Time Out magazine ranked the film at No.8 on its list of "The 100 best thriller films of all time".

== Copyright status and home media ==
According to one source, The 39 Steps is copyrighted worldwide but has been heavily bootlegged on home video. Despite this, various licensed, restored releases have appeared on DVD, Blu-ray and video-on-demand services from Network in the UK, The Criterion Collection in the US and many others.

== Legacy ==
In chapter 10 of J. D. Salinger's 1951 novel The Catcher in the Rye, the protagonist Holden Caulfield recounts the admiration that he and his younger sister Phoebe have for the film. (Note: "Her favorite [movie] is The 39 Steps, though, with Robert Donat. She knows the whole goddam movie by heart, because I've taken her to see it about ten times. When old Donat comes up to this Scotch farmhouse, for instance, when he's running away from the cops and all, Phoebe'll say right out loud in the movie—right when the Scotch guy in the picture says it—'Can you eat the herring?' She knows all the talk by heart...")

Buchan's The Thirty-Nine Steps has been adapted to film three additional times, in 1959, 1978 and 2008, with varying levels of influence from Hitchcock's version.

The comedy play The 39 Steps is a parody of this film version of the story, with a cast of just four people for all the parts. It was written in 1995 by Simon Corble and Nobby Dimon. A version rewritten in 2005 by Patrick Barlow has played in the West End and on Broadway.

== Sources ==
- Biskind, Peter (16 July 2013). My Lunches with Orson: Conversations between Henry Jaglom and Orson Welles. Henry Holt and Company. ISBN 9780805097269.
- Glancy, Mark (2003). The 39 Steps: A British Film Guide. London: Tauris. ISBN 1-86064-614-X.
- Sedgwick, John; Pokorny, Michael (2005). "The Film Business in the United States and Britain during the 1930s" (PDF). The Economic History Review. New Series. 58 (1): 79–112. doi:10.1111/j.1468-0289.2005.00299.x. S2CID 152896495.
- Spoto, Donald (1999). The Dark Side of Genius: The Life of Alfred Hitchcock. Da Capo. ISBN 030680932X.
- St. Pierre, Paul Matthew (2009). Music Hall Mimesis in British Film, 1895–1960: On the Halls on the Screen. Madison, New Jersey: Fairleigh Dickinson University Press. ISBN 978-0-8386-4191-0.
- Vermilye, Jerry (1978). The Great British Films. London: Citadel Press. ISBN 0-8065-0661-X.
