= Isabel Hodgins =

English actress (born 1993)

- Born: 23 November 1993 (age 32); Eccles, Greater Manchester, England
- Education: Sylvia Young Theatre School
- Occupation: Actress
- Years active: 2006–present
- Spouse: Adam Whitehead (m. 2025)
- Children: 1

Isabel Hodgins (born 23 November 1993) is an English actress, known for playing Victoria Sugden in the ITV soap opera Emmerdale from 2006.

== Career ==
Hodgins made an appeal in the Salford Advertiser for funding to allow her to spend a year at Sylvia Young Theatre School in London.

In 2006, the production team behind the ITV soap Emmerdale decided to replace the established character of Victoria Sugden with a more mature actress. The character of Victoria had been in the show since 1994 and had been played by Jessica Haywood (1994–1998) and Hannah Midgley (1998–2006). In an attempt to change the character, it was decided that the role should be re-cast. Then 12-year-old Hodgins secured the role and began filming on 21 August 2006. Her first episode aired on 12 October 2006.

== Awards ==
Hodgins was nominated for 'Best Newcomer' at the TV Choice and TV Quick awards in 2007.

Hodgins was also nominated for the 'Spectacular Scene of the Year' award at the British Soap Awards 2007 for the scene where Victoria and Billy Hopwood were involved in a truck crash. The car crashed into a lake and sank. Emmerdale won the award, but for a different storyline – the infamous show home explosion story from July 2006.

In 2008, she was nominated for 'Best Young Actress' at the Inside Soap Awards.

On 4 May 2009, it was revealed that Hodgins had been shortlisted in the 'Best Dramatic Performance from a Young Actor or Actress' category at the British Soap Awards. She was up against Maisie Smith, Ellis Hollins and Alex Bain. Hodgins lost out to Maisie Smith but won the 'Spectacular Scene of the Year' award at the British Soap Awards for the scene when her Emmerdale character Victoria fell through ice into a lake and discovered a dead body.
