= Shas Pollak =

Jews who memorized the Babylonian Talmud

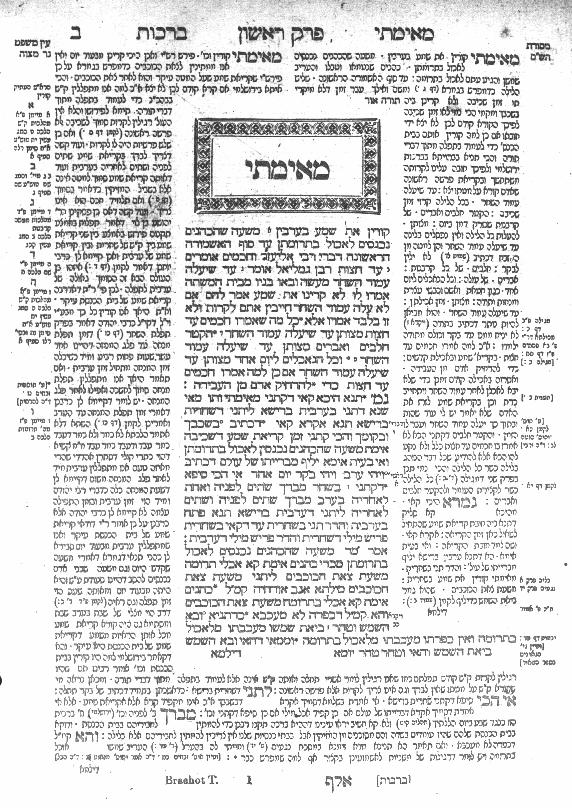
The first page of the Vilna Edition of the Babylonian Talmud, Tractate Berachot, folio 2a.

Shas Pollak were Jewish mnemonists who, according to the 1917 report of George Stratton in the Psychological Review, memorized the exact layout of words in more than 5,000 pages of the 12 books of the standard edition of the Babylonian Talmud.

== Report ==
Stratton's report consists of accounts of and comments on testimonials of three eyewitnesses. Two of the eyewitnesses stated that the memorizing was related to the Talmud part, printed in the centers of the pages, and not the surrounding commentary.

G.M. Stratton quotes a letter from a Reverend Dr. David Phillipson of Cincinnati who described the so-called "pin test":

...A pin would be placed on a word, let us say, the fourth word in line eight; the memory sharp would then be asked what word is in the same spot on page thirty-eight or fifty or any other page; the pin would be pressed through the volume until it reached page thirty eight or page fifty or any other page designated; the memory sharp would then mention the word and it was found invariably correct. He had visualized in his brain the whole Talmud; in other words, the pages of the Talmud were photographed on his brain. It was one of the most stupendous feats of memory I have ever witnessed and there was no fake about it.

Another reputable witness was Dr. Solomon Schechter, the then President of the Jewish Theological Seminary of America.

This feat has since been quoted in many books on memory.

Stratton writes that all eyewitnesses noticed that none of the Shas Pollak known to them have attained any prominence in the scholarly world.

In a footnote, Stratton's article also mentions that memorizing the Talmud was a subject of the work by J. Brüll, "Die Mnemotechnik des Talmuds", Vienna, 1864, and that the Talmudic mnemonics is a subject of an article in the Jewish Encyclopedia.

== Etymology ==
"Shas" is a Hebrew acronym for the words shishah sedarim, "six orders", or Mishnah; "shas" is also a colloquial reference to the Talmud. "Pollak" means "Pole" in Yiddish, referring to a Polish Jew, so the term literally means "The Talmud-Pole" or the "Polish Talmudist."

== Literary references ==
A 1993 novelette Ginger (Рыжик) by Mikhail Veller about the fate of a Jewish boy who became a member of spetsnaz, has the following passage: "Torah was supposed to be known as follows. The Grandfather opened the book at random and punched a word with a pin. You were supposed to recite the text starting with the word pinned on the opposite page of the sheet."

== See also ==
- Illui
- Funes the Memorious
