= Illui =

Young Torah and Talmudic prodigy or genius

Illui (Hebrew: עילוי or עלוי also ilui; pronounced [ʔiˈluj] plural: illuim) is a young Talmudic prodigy. The Hebrew term is applied to exceptional Talmudic scholars among Jews.

== Etymology ==
Illui literally means "upraising" and was used in the sense of "fundraising effort" in Medieval Hebrew. In the early modern period, provincial Ashkenazic villages would raise scholarships for their best students to attend larger institutions, and eventually the term "illui of [place]" (scholarship student from [place]) came to be understood as "prodigy of [place]".

== Judaic mystical traditions ==
There are some Judaic mystical traditions that explain how and why illuim are different. One explanation attributes it to an "Angel's Slap":

An intriguing legend from the Talmud and Midrash describes how a child, while still in its mother's womb, is taught the entire Torah to the glow of a supernatural lamp that allows it to see to the ends of the earth. It is only at the moment of birth that an angel appears and imposes upon it an oath to live a righteous life, and then slaps the youngster on the mouth or the nose, causing it to forget all that it has learned.

The angel's smack in the Talmudic legend produces total amnesia for all, but in the Greek theory of "anamnesis" the souls quaff varying quantities of the oblivion-inducing potion. The clever souls drink no more than they have to, which makes for an easier job of learning and recalling during their coming lives. Only the foolish and short-sighted souls make the mistake of rashly and greedily gulping down excessive doses, dooming them to lives of ignorance and dull-wittedness.

Furthermore, the Jewish world had its share of child prodigies and geniuses who mastered the Talmud at a tender age (such a person is known in Hebrew as an illui). This phenomenon could be ascribed to the soul's evading the angel's slap, whether by accident or design.

The usage of the term is also used with caution in terms of its practical implications for the one who holds it. For example, Jonathan Rosenblum, a notable Haredi commentator has cautioned that:

Talmudic prodigies exist. But there is a certain type of wisdom that only comes with age and life experience, no matter how brilliant a person may be. That is why the leaders of the Torah world are inevitably drawn from the ranks of the ziknei hador ("elders of the generation"). If the first adjective still used to describe a person is ilui, he is probably not yet ready for leadership.

== Technical usage in the yeshiva world ==
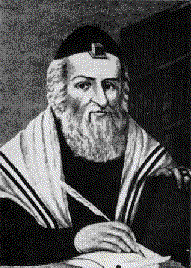
Rabbi Elijah Ben Solomon, the Vilna Gaon, leader of the Lithuanian Misnagdim

The Jewish Encyclopedia explains that in the history of the yeshivas (also known as Talmudical or rabbinical schools or academies), the term illui had a definite function:

The students in the yeshibah were grouped according to the cities whence they came. Thus one would be known as "Itzel der Kovner" (Isaac of Kovno) and another as "Getzil der Warsawer." Some received the title "'illui" (= "the excellent") or "matmid" (= "diligent student"), such a one being known, for example, as "Der Kovner 'Illui" or "Der Lomzer Matmid," assuming that only one from a town was so designated. The title was given by the general consent of the students. They studied singly or in pair.

== Recognition in all denominations ==
The term illui has widespread usage in all Jewish denominations. Rabbi Eric Yoffie, President of the Union for Reform Judaism in the United States states that: "... It was the illui – the truly superior student – who would devote his life to study, while others would return to full-time employment. Indeed, even when the great yeshivot of Eastern Europe were at their height, the number of students was relatively modest and smaller than the number of full-time Torah students in Israel today..." (writing for Union for Reform Judaism, 2008.)

== Examples ==
- Rabbi Jonathan Eybeschutz (1690–1764):"...An "illui," a child prodigy in his youth, Rabbi Yonasan became one of the great commentators on the Talmud and on the "Shulchan Aruch," the Codes of Jewish Law..." (Orthodox Union biography)
- The Vilna Gaon (Rabbi Eliyahu ben Shlomo Zalman) (1720–1797): "...Recognized early in life as an illui (child prodigy), at the early age of six, he gave a complicated sermon (drasha) in the Synagogue of Vilna amazing the listeners by answering questions with great depth. This, in a city known worldwide for its scholarship..."
- Rabbi Chaim of Volozhin (1749-1821): “Who is the person who desires Chaim/life, who returns the hearts of the sons to their Father in Heaven, path which he chose for himself, who is clear and illuminating, who is the unique path and eye of the community, Torah and teaching, the great person, his honor, the great Rabbi and prodigy in the revealed and hidden parts of Torah, wonder of the generation, our teacher and Rabbi, Chaim, of blessed righteous and saintly memory head of the Bet Din and head of the Yeshiva of the holy community of Volozhin, a student of our great master, the Rabbi of Israel, the prodigy, the pious one, our teacher and Rabbi, Eliyahu of Vilna, whose soul is in Eden”
- Rabbi Reb Noson of Breslov Chassidut (1780–1844): "...He is an illui about Chassidut..." (Kotzker Rebbe)
- Abraham Mapu (Hebrew writer) (1808–1867): "...His early education in Bible and Talmud was received at the heder, on leaving which, at the age of twelve, he continued the study of the Talmud in private, and was so successful that he soon acquired the name of "'Illui" (Friedberg, "Zikronot," in "Hausfreund," i. 22)..." (Jewish Encyclopedia)
- Rabbi Meir Shapiro (1887–1933), Polish rabbi born in Bukovina, known in his youth as Shotzer Iluy (the Iluy from Suceava)
- Regarding Rabbi Menachem Ziemba (1883–1943) and his son: "...In 5684 Reb Menachem lost his son, Moshe Yehudah Aryeh, at the age of 19. The young boy was already known as an illui (genius) in the same mold as his father..."
- Rabbi Isser Yehuda Unterman (Chief Rabbi of Israel), (1886–1976): "...From a young age Unterman was known as the "Illui (luminary) of Brisk". In 1898, he was invited to become one of the founding students of Etz Chaim Yeshiva branch in Maltsch (Maltash), Belorussia. For some time, he also studied at the Mir Yeshiva, but later returned to Maltsch..."
- Rabbi Dovid Lifshitz (1906–1993): "...Born in Minsk, Russia, in 1906, Rabbi Lifshitz was recognized at a very young age as an "illui," a child prodigy in Jewish studies. At the age of 12, he coedited a volume of commentary on the Bible..." (Obituary in The New York Times, 1993)
- Rabbi Menachem Mendel Schneerson (1902–1994): “He was considered an ilul, or genius, and even his tutors had a hard time keeping up with him. By the time Schneerson was seventeen, he had mastered the entire Talmud, some 5,894 pages, in its Hebrew editions.”
- Rabbi Louis Jacobs (1920 - 2006), of the Conservative Judaism-Masorti Movement, has been described as being: "...Identified by his teachers as an ilui, a talmudic genius — renowned even then for his prodigious memory and sharp intellect — he went on to study at the Gateshead Kollel, which at that time was considered the Oxford of rabbinical academies..."
- Rabbi Shlomo Carlebach, the musician, (1925–1994): "...Shlomo was a child prodigy scholar called an illui in Hebrew. He had the Torah (Bible) half memorized by the time he was a scant five years old and had an insatiable love of learning Judaism. He was carefully guarded and received treatment reserved for royalty..."

== See also ==
- Da'as Torah
- Gaon
- Gadol
- History of responsa
- Posek
- Shas Pollak
