= Hannah Midgley =

English actress (b. 1993)

- Born: 27 October 1993 (age 32); Idle, West Yorkshire, England
- Education: Woodhouse Grove School and Bronte House, Apperley Bridge; Debut Theatre School
- Occupation: Actress
- Years active: 1995–present
- Television: Emmerdale; In the Club

Hannah Elizabeth Midgley (born 27 October 1993) is an English actress best known for playing Victoria Sugden on the ITV programme Emmerdale. She replaced Jessica Haywood in 1997 and left in July 2006 to concentrate on her studies; she was succeeded by Isabel Hodgins.

In 1995, she played toddler Winrow in A Touch of Frost. In 2014, she played Rosie in the BBC One drama series In the Club. This was her first television role since leaving Emmerdale.

== Filmography ==
=== Television ===
Year	Title	Role	Notes	Refs.
1995	A Touch of Frost	Toddler Winrow	Episode: "Dead Male One"	
1997–2006	Emmerdale	Victoria Sugden	Series regular	
2014–2016	In the Club	Rosie		
