= Jonathan Kerrigan =

English actor

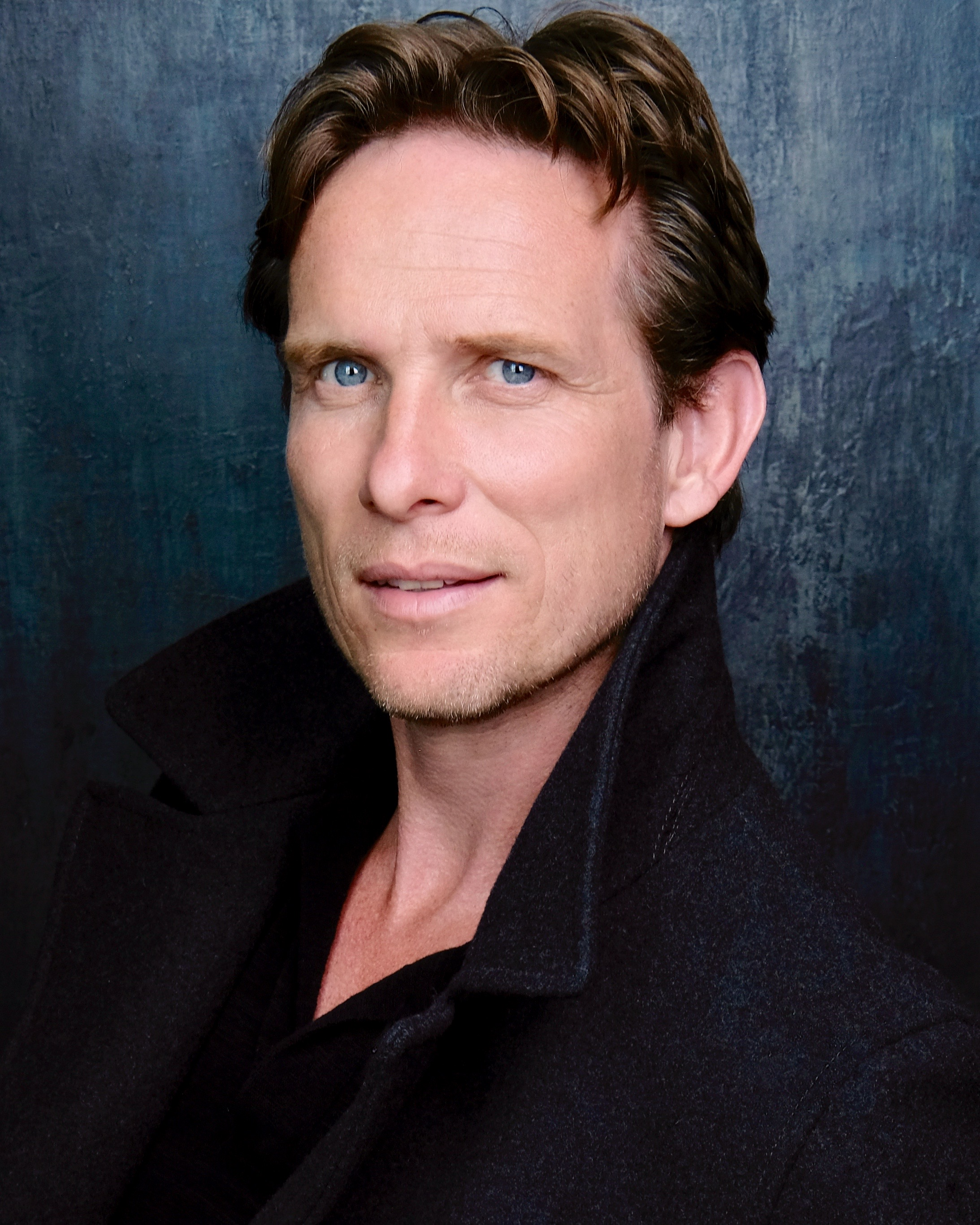
- Born: 14 October 1972 (age 53); Lincoln, Lincolnshire, England
- Occupation: Actor
- Years active: 1996–present
- Spouse: Shelley Conn (m. 2011)
- Children: 1

Jonathan Kerrigan (born 14 October 1972) is an English actor well known for various leading roles on TV including In the Club, Casualty, Heartbeat, Merseybeat, The Five and Reach for the Moon. Films include Diana, FLiM, The Somnambulists ,The Best Possible Taste and The Santa Incident. He wrote and composed and starred in the short film, Fellow Creatures which has had some success in the festival circuit. He is also a musician and has composed for both television and film.

== Career ==
He had his screen debut in the music video for The Chemical Brothers's 1995 song, "Life Is Sweet". His first television appearance was in a 1995 episode of the BBC Television teen drama, Byker Grove.

From 1996 to 1999 he played a Project 2000 nurse, Sam Colloby, in the BBC medical drama Casualty.

In 2001, as well as starring in Merseybeat as Police Constable Steve Traynor, Kerrigan also composed the theme tune. On 5 September 2004, Kerrigan made his first appearance as police constable Rob Walker in the British popular and long-running primetime television drama series Heartbeat, set in the 1960s in the North Riding of Yorkshire. Constable Walker was a popular character, whose story arc included marrying Helen Trent (played by Sophie Ward), who later dies in an explosion in the Police House. In April 2007, Kerrigan announced his decision to leave the series.

In 2012, he appeared in a Richard Jobson film called The Somnambulists, about British servicemen and women reflecting on the action they saw in Basra during the Iraq War. He composed some of the original music for the film including the opening title sequence.

In 2012, he played John Alkin in BBC Four's The Best Possible Taste, a biography of Kenny Everett. He appeared in the 2013 film Diana, starring Naomi Watts as Diana, Princess of Wales.

In 2014, he played Neil in In the Club, returning for Series 2, in 2016.

He also appeared in and wrote original music for an ongoing film project called FLiM by Raffaello Degruttola.

2015 was a busy year for Kerrigan. He filmed a ten-part drama for SKY 1 called The Five written by Harlen Coben playing American businessman Stuart Carew. He also filmed series 2 of In the Club, both of which are to be screened in 2016.

In 2021, he played Richard in four episodes of The Syndicate.

In 2024, he appeared in three episodes of long-running historical fantasy series Outlander as the Reverend Peleg Woodsworth.

== Personal life ==
Kerrigan married British actoress Shelley Conn in 2011; together the couple have a son, Oscar (b. 2012). In 2019, they played a married couple in the episode "Murder Most Animal", of Death in Paradise.

== Filmography ==
=== Film ===
Year	Title	Role	Notes
2001	Talk	Robert	Short film
2010	Charlie	Jurgen	Short film
2011	The Somnambulists	Man 4	
2013	Diana	Colin	
2014	Flim: The Movie	Nathan Saunders	
2017	55 Steps	Dr. Bardy	
2021	Fellow Creatures	Tom	Short film

=== Television ===
Year	Title	Role	Notes
1995	Byker Grove	Mick	1 episode
1996	Peak Practice	Ewan Harvey	Episode: "A New Life"
1996–1999	Casualty	Sam Colloby	Series regular (series 11–14)
1999	Holby City	Sam Colloby	Episode: "Happy Families"
2000	Reach for the Moon	Paul Martin	Miniseries, main cast
2000	The Knock	Rob Maguire	2 episodes
2000	A Dinner of Herbs	Roddy Greenbank	Miniseries, recurring role
2001–2003	Merseybeat	PC Steve Traynor	Main cast (series 1–3)
2002	Having It Off	Nicky	Miniseries, unknown episodes
2004	The Afternoon Play	Ian Parnell	Episode: "Drive"
2004–2007	Heartbeat	PC Rob Walker	Main cast (series 14–17)
2010	Doctors	Luke Radcliffe	Episode: "Catching"
2010	NCIS	Rex Carhartt	Episode: "Obsession"
2010	Emmerdale	Prosecution Barrister	4 episodes
2010	The Santa Incident	Hank	TV movie
2012	Best Possible Taste: The Kenny Everett Story	John Alkin	TV movie
2014–2016	In the Club	Neil	Main cast
2016	The Five	Stuart Carew	Miniseries, recurring role
2017	Stan Lee's Lucky Man	Jonny	Recurring role (series 2)
2018	Hackerville	Darius Webberly	Episode: "Wollen wir spilen?"
2019	Death in Paradise	Xander Shepherd	Episode: "Murder Most Animal"
2019	Pandora	Seeker Creston Hubbell	3 episodes
2021	The Syndicate	Richard	4 episodes
2021	Crime	Mark McKendrick	Recurring role (series 1)
