= Datas (mnemonist) =

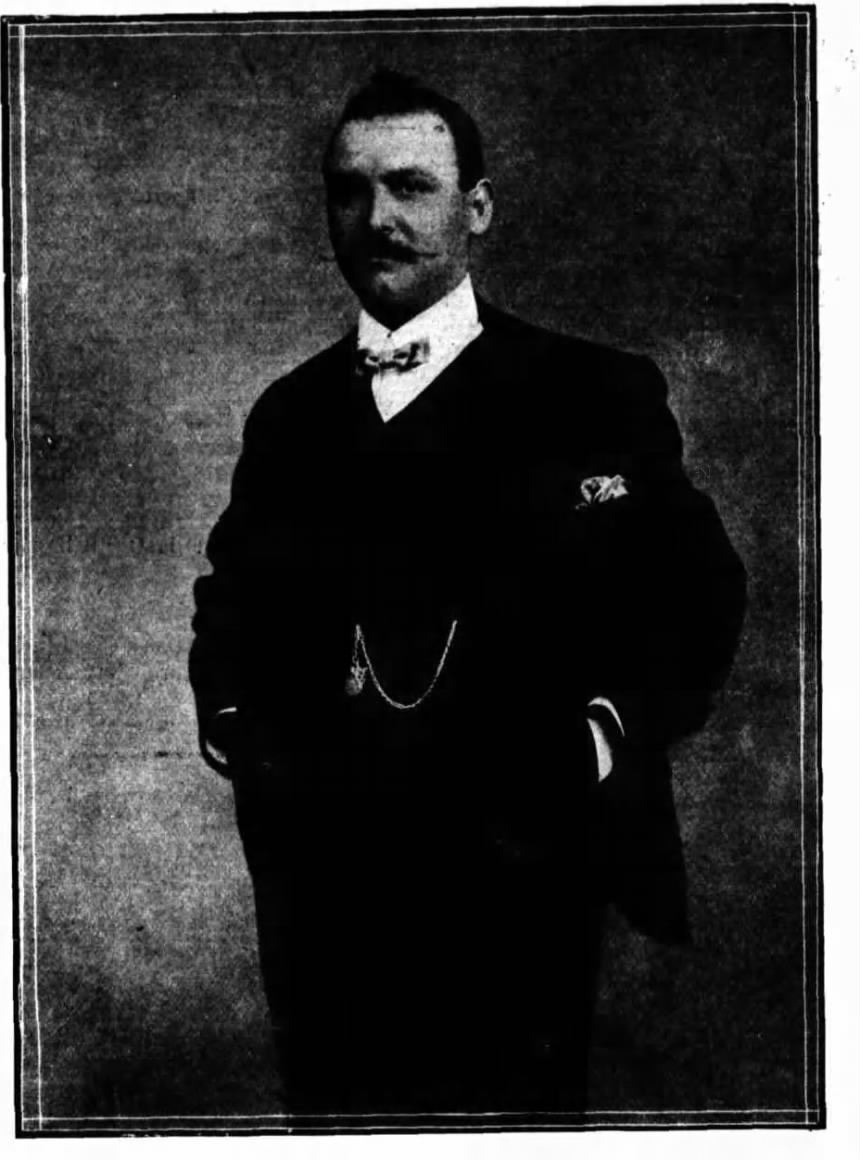
- Born: William John Morris Bottle; 20 July 1875; Newnham, Kent, England
- Died: 23 August 1956 (aged 81); Croydon, Surrey, England
- Years active: c.1901 – 1930s

William John Morris Bottle (Note: In later years, he spelled his third name as Maurice, and his family name as Bottell.) (20 July 1875 – 23 August 1956), billed as Datas, the Memory Man, was an English mnemonist who performed in music halls. He was known for his exceptional ability to recall and answer questions about facts, figures and dates from memory, and was also known as "The Living Almanack" or "The Living Encyclopaedia".

== Life and career ==
He was born in Newnham, Kent, the son of a shoemaker, and moved to London as a young child. Then known as John or Jack Bottle, he grew up in Penge and Forest Hill, and after leaving school undertook various jobs as a delivery boy, and then as a stoker in a gas works. In 1901, he encountered two men arguing over the date of the Tichborne trial, and intervened to give the correct answer. When he correctly and accurately answered several other questions on dates and venues, he was overheard by a music hall performer, Tom Bass, who persuaded producer and hall owner Thomas Dickie to offer him the opportunity to go on stage.

He was an immediate success on the music hall circuit, and began touring Britain and Ireland as part of a variety programme, taking the stage name of "Datas". He spent a great deal of time reading and memorising encyclopedias and almanacs, and was rarely wrong. He was able to quickly answer almost any factual question asked of him by the audience, relying solely on his memory, and often embellishing his answers with associated facts. His catchphrase after answering was "Am I right, sir?".

Datas had a long career as an onstage performer. He toured the United States in 1904, and Australia in 1909. He stated that, in America, doctors described his brain as the largest they had ever seen, had paid him £2,000 to leave his head to science after his death. He claimed to use no special mnemonics, and wrote about his abilities and memory techniques in the books Memory: a simple system of memory training (1904) and his autobiography Datas, the Memory Man (1932).

The 1935 Alfred Hitchcock film The 39 Steps includes a central character, Mr. Memory, closely based on Hitchcock's early memories of seeing Datas on stage.

He died in hospital in Croydon in 1956, at the age of 81.
