= Chiké Okonkwo =

Nigerian English actor (born 1982)

- Born: 18 March 1982 (age 44); Kingston upon Thames, London, England
- Occupation: Actor
- Years active: 2002–present
- Website: www.ChikeOkonkwo.com (Archive.org)

Chiké Okonkwo (/ˈtʃiːkeɪ əˈkɒŋkwoʊ/; born 18 March 1982) is a British actor. He is known for portraying PC Clark in New Tricks, DC Callum Gada in Paradox, Lee Truitt in Being Mary Jane, and Ty Coleman in La Brea.

== Early life ==
Born and brought up in Kingston upon Thames, Okonkwo is of Nigerian descent. He attended Tolworth Infants/Juniors School and Southborough High School in Hook, and later turned down a number of places at the UK's leading drama schools in order to pursue a university education, gaining a First Class degree in Business Computing from the University of Surrey, graduating in 2003. After completing his studies Okonkwo pursued an acting career full-time.

== Career ==
Okonkwo was one of ten actors selected from 12,000 applicants for the BBC Talent Scheme in 2001, leading to his first professional acting role in Holby City. He trained at the National Youth Theatre, and was a member of the National Youth Music Theatre between 1999 and 2002. Okonkwo is the patron of the Kingston-based International Youth Arts Festival.

Okonkwo's stage credits include Oklahoma!, Into the Woods, Fixer, As You Like It, In Time and A Matter of Life and Death. He spent a year performing at the National Theatre, where he appeared in several productions including Philip Pullman's His Dark Materials.

Okonkwo's film work includes Derailed (2005), Animal (2005) and Spirit Trap (2005). He has also appeared in the short films Tooting Broadway Flatmates and Knock Off.

On television, Okonkwo has made guest appearances in episodes of Holby City, Silent Witness, Casualty, M.I.T.: Murder Investigation Team and Roman Mysteries. He also appeared in Blood and Oil, a BBC Two drama about the oil conflict in the Niger Delta. Okonkwo played the lead roles of PC Clark in the pilot and first series of New Tricks, and DC Callum Gada in Paradox.

Okonkwo is a long-standing member of the Royal Shakespeare Company (RSC) performing in their 50th Anniversary season in Stratford-Upon-Avon, and most recently in Gregory Doran's critically acclaimed production of Julius Caesar at the Brooklyn Academy of Music (BAM) in New York in 2013.

He co-starred in The Birth of a Nation, which premiered in competition at the Sundance Film Festival in 2016.

== Acting Credits ==
=== Film ===
Year	Film	Role	Notes
2005	Spirit Trap	Edmund Joseph	
2005	Animal	Doctor	
2005	Derailed	Paramedic	
2007	Treasured Island	Sam	
2015	Genesis	Abel	
2016	The Birth of a Nation	Will	
2017	Burning Sands		

=== Television ===
Year	Show	Role	Notes
2002	Holby City	Ian Clarke: Judas Kiss (Part One) (2002)	Medical drama
2002	Silent Witness	PC Ben Manning: Closed Ranks: Part One (2002); Closed Ranks: Part Two (2002)	Crime drama
2003	New Tricks	PC Clark (2003–2004)	Police drama
2003	Doctors	Jordan Alan: Keeping the Peace (2003)	Soap opera
2005	M.I.T.: Murder Investigation Team	Marlon Raines: Episode 2.3 (2005)	Police drama
2006	The Royal	Jermaine Johnson: Seeking Refuge (2006)	Medical drama
2006	Shoot the Messenger	Kwame	Television play
2007	Roman Mysteries	Kuanto: The Pirates of Pompeii (2007)	Children's TV series
2007	Casualty	Kristou Vadepied: Take a Cup of Kindness Yet (2007); For Auld Lang Syne (2007)	Medical drama
2008	Lewis	Jonjo Read: Life Born of Fire (2008)	Police drama
2008	Doctors	Charlie Morgan: Gathering Light (2008)	Soap opera
2009	Paradox	DC Callum Gada	Sci-fi crime drama
2010	Blood and Oil	Ebi	TV serial
2015	Banshee	Lennox	TV serial
	Class	Ballon -The Metaphysical Engine, or What Quill Did (2016)	TV serial
2016–2019	Being Mary Jane	Lee Truitt	TV series
2021–2024	La Brea	Ty Coleman	TV series; Main role
2024	WondLa	Besteel	Voice role

=== Video games ===
Year	Title	Role
2013	Killzone: Mercenary	Additional Characters (voice)
2017	Mass Effect: Andromeda	Additional Characters (voice)
2019	Anthem	Prospero (voice)
2021	Call of Duty: Vanguard	Sgt. Arthur Kingsley (voice)

=== Stage ===
Year	Title	Role	Notes
2026	An Ideal Husband	Sir Robert Chiltern	Lyric Hammersmith
