= Lizzie Mickery =

British screenwriter

Elizabeth Mickery
- Occupations: Screenwriter, actress
- Known for: Tenko; Messiah; The State Within

Elizabeth Mickery is a British writer and former actress. She was known for her role as Maggie Thorpe in the BBC television drama series Tenko, roles in Emmerdale Farm, Juliet Bravo, Lovejoy, Heartbeat, Woof!, The Merryhill Millionaires, Dogfood Dan and the Carmarthen Cowboy and Holby City.

== Career ==
Since 2000, Mickery has worked exclusively as a screenwriter, usually credited as Lizzie Mickery, for various British TV series such as Byker Grove, The Bill, Heartbeat, Pie in the Sky, Sunburn, Harbour Lights, The Ice House (adapted from the novel by Minette Walters), The Beggar Bride (adapted from the novel by Gillian White) and The Inspector Lynley Mysteries (adapted from the Elizabeth George novels).

She also wrote Messiah, Messiah 2 and Messiah 3 for the BBC. One-off dramas include Sinners, Every Time You Look At Me, and Dirty War which she co-wrote with writer-director Daniel Percival. They have subsequently written the conspiracy thriller The State Within, which was nominated for two Golden Globes in 2008. Instinct, a two-part thriller that was shown on ITV in 2007 was also written by her. In 2008 she wrote the screenplay for the BBC drama The 39 Steps, an adaptation of the John Buchan novel The Thirty-Nine Steps. In late November 2009 the BBC transmitted Paradox, written by Mickery.

Since 2012, she has been combining her career in the UK with one in Los Angeles. She has worked as a consulting producer/writer for Rogue, the second season of The Following and Proof. She was co-executive producer on Netflix's award-winning drama, Bloodline and worked with Guillermo del Toro developing the mini-series The Nutshell Studies of Unexplained Deaths for HBO. Most recently, she wrote on Snowpiercer and The Right Stuff
