= In the Club =

British television series

- Genre: Drama
- Created by: Kay Mellor
- Written by: Kay Mellor (12 Episodes); Gaynor Faye (1 Episode)
- Starring: Hermione Norris; Katherine Parkinson; Jill Halfpenny; Christine Bottomley; Taj Atwal; Hannah Midgley; Luke Thompson; Will Mellor; Jonathan Kerrigan; Sacha Dhawan; Tara Fitzgerald; Brendan Patricks; Daniel Breeze; Sandra Huggett; Gemma Dobson; Paul Nicholls; Andrew Buckley; Neil Pearson; John Marquez
- Theme music composer: Hal Lindes
- Opening theme: "Wonderful World" by Rebecca Ferguson
- Ending theme: Hal Lindes
- Composer: Hal Lindes
- Country of origin: United Kingdom
- Original language: English
- No. of series: 2
- No. of episodes: 12

Production
- Executive producers: Kay Mellor; Polly Hill
- Producer: Yvonne Francas
- Production locations: Leeds, Yorkshire, England
- Editor: Kay Mellor
- Running time: 60 minutes
- Production company: Rollem Productions

Original release
- Network: BBC One; BBC One HD
- Release: 5 August 2014 – 7 June 2016

In the Club is a British drama television series that was first broadcast on BBC One on 5 August 2014. The series follows six couples who attended a local Parent Craft class during their pregnancy. The series was written and created by Kay Mellor. A second series was commissioned in 2014 and broadcast in the UK from 3 May to 7 June 2016.

== Production ==
On 18 June 2013, BBC One announced the commissioning of the series. The series was commissioned by Danny Cohen, former controller of BBC One, and Ben Stephenson, controller of BBC Drama commissioning. Filming took place in Leeds from January 2014 several scenes of which took part in Allerton High School.

== Cast ==
Main cast

- Hermione Norris as Roanna Wilson, a 40-something woman who gives up her marriage, family and successful business to be with her 27-year-old boyfriend, Simon. She and Simon have a son together called Sonny. She has met Simon's parents and seems to know Simon's father, Jonathan, from an earlier time. Simon's mum Emma and Simon are not aware of this, but her ex-husband Ray is aware of what has happened between Roanna and Jonathan. Her now ex-husband declares that he still loves her.
- Katherine Parkinson as Kim Hall, a part-time teaching assistant who works at the same school that Rosie and her girlfriend Susie's son Jude attends. She has her own website, Kim and the bump, which offers advice for other expectant mums. Her and Susie's relationship faces some tensions when Kim supports Rosie, Jude's girlfriend. She has a close relationship with her baby's biological father Neil. She gives birth to a daughter named Emily. In series 2, she is in a romantic relationship with Neil. Kim wants to be a good mother to her daughter. She is the main godmother to Jude and Rosie's daughter Dinah, but she feels guilty on how things ended between her and Susie when she and Neil got together.
- Jill Halfpenny as Diane Manning, a woman who has struggled to naturally conceive with her husband Rick. She is the mother to her two adoptive children Ellie and Sam. She is happy about the arrival of her twins Hope and Zack and she is worried, as her husband may soon face prison for robbing a bank. She has no money (her husband did not tell her he had been made redundant) and Hope is critically ill. Diane gets her licence as a child minder, and gets income this way.
- Christine Bottomley as Victoria "Vicky" Brierly, a midwife at the hospital who goes the extra mile for her patients. Along with her colleagues, Geraldine and Fiona, she holds parenting classes that the others attend. She is pregnant and wants to get married before her baby is born, if only she can convince the baby's father, Dr Chris Bellingham. Her colleagues have no idea that Dr Bellingham is her baby's father. She gives birth to her and Chris' son named Ben. In series 2, she is working full-time and looking after her son Ben alone while Chris is travelling to find the woman he married years ago for money. She faces her biggest challenge of her midwife career when a new mother died after she delivered the baby, after the inquest, Vicky wasn't to blame. Chris returns from his travels.
- Taj Atwal as Jasmin Sidhwa, a woman who is unsure if the father of her unborn baby is her husband Dev or her ex-boyfriend Jack. She gives birth to a daughter called Amber. Later hospital tests confirmed that her husband Dev is the father to their daughter. In series 2, she and Dev are expecting twins and facing the biggest decision of their lives after an ultrasound scan reveals some devastating news.
- Hannah Midgley as Rosie Hutchinson, a fifteen-year-old school girl who gets pregnant after her first time with boyfriend Jude. She kept her pregnancy a secret from everyone including her widowed father. She found comfort from Kim's website. She gives birth to a daughter and names her Dinah after her late mother. After Rosie has given birth, she learns that her father has been badly injured in a car accident and cannot support her. She is supported by Kim. Rosie announces that the father of her daughter is Jude. In series 2, Rosie and Jude are in a relationship; they are expecting their second child. Rosie gives birth in a stalled lift, with aid from Jude, to their second daughter named Davina. She, Jude and their children now live in her father's flat after some tensions between Jude's mum Susie and her new partner Claire.
- Sacha Dhawan as Devan "Dev" Sidhwa, Jasmin's husband and is the father of their daughter. In series 2, Dev and Jamsin are facing the biggest decision of their lives after an hospital visit reveals some devastating news about their unborn twins.
- Will Mellor as Richard "Rick" Manning, Diane's husband and father of their two adoptive children and the soon-to-be-born twins. He robs a bank after he could not afford to pay for his children's lunch. In series 2, when he returns home from serving his sentence, he realises that his wife is a child-minder and helps her out. Whilst helping her out one of the children hurts her arm, so he takes everyone to hospital. The little girl is fixed up, but hospital personnel challenge Diane's status as a child minder. Diane is then told that she can only do her job if her husband is not in the house.
- Jonathan Kerrigan as Neil, father of Jude, and he is father of Kim's baby. He and Kim share a close and growing relationship. Kim gives birth to a girl called Emily. He learned that his son Jude is the father to Rosie's daughter Dinah. In series 2, he and Kim are in romantic relationship, but he is aware that Susie is in a new relationship and kept it from Kim.
- Luke Thompson as Simon Lambert, Roanna's 27-year-old boyfriend, who is an art graduate student. His parents are Jonathan and Emma. He and Roanna are parents to a son named Sonny.
- Tara Fitzgerald as Susie, she is the mother of Jude, whose father is Neil. She is Kim's girlfriend at the start. Their relationship faces some tensions, because she does not like it when Kim shows support towards Rosie. Then she learns that her son Jude is the father of Rosie's daughter Dinah. She later notices how close Kim and Neil are and ends her friendship with Kim. In series 2, she is in a new relationship with Claire. The house she shared with Kim has been sold. She plans to travel with Claire but faces tensions with her son Jude and Rosie.
- John Marquez as Ray Wilson (series 2, recurring series 1), is Roanna's soon-to-be ex-husband and father to her older children. He owns a recruitment company, and he and Roanna are getting a divorce. In series 2, Ray and Roanna are now divorced. He gives Roanna some of her settlement money from their divorce after she asks him for help. He is aware of Roanna's history with Jonathan, and also declares that he still has feelings for her.
- Brendan Patricks as Dr Chris Bellingham, a doctor at the hospital who is in a relationship with midwife Vicky and is the father of her baby. Their colleagues are not aware of the relationship. Vicky gives birth to their son named Ben. In series 2, Vicky mentions that he is travelling to find the wife, whom he married for money, to divorce her. Once divorced, he can marry Vicky. He later returns home after traveling.
- Sandra Huggett as Maxine (series 2), works as a cleaner for Nathan and Andrew. Maxine and her husband Micky have an on-again, off-again relationship. Her daughter Shelley is expecting a child for her bosses. Maxine is worried Shelly has not thought surrogacy through. Maxine finds a newborn baby boy in a hospital toilet. The hospital staff name the baby Louie. Eventually Maxine confesses that she is the mother of this baby boy.
- Gemma Dobson as Shelly (series 2), she's Maxine's daughter and expecting a child for her mum's bosses Nathan and Andrew. Now, she is in the last trimester of her pregnancy and thinks it is the perfect way to make some money; £10k for a healthy baby.
- Paul Nicholls as Nathan (series 2), is a successful interior designer who lives with his long-term partner Andrew. Their cleaner's daughter, Shelly agrees to help them out when they say they would pay her to carry their child.
- Andrew Buckley as Andrew (series 2), is very excited to become a father and has taken as much paternity leave as possible from his job. He is busy rushing around to get everything ready, buying provisions they need for the arrival of their child and wants updates from Shelly.
- Neil Pearson as Jonathan Lambert (series 2, recurring series 1) is Simon's father. He seems to know his son's partner Roanna from a previous time, of which his wife Emma and his son Simon are not aware.

Supporting cast

- Steven Elder as Dave Hutchinson.
- Will Tudor as Jack Moorhouse (series 1), a solicitor, who is Jasmin's ex-boyfriend and could be the father of her baby, however later on, tests reveal that he is not the father.
- Lorraine Cheshire as Geraldine Parks, a senior midwife at the hospital, who holds parenting classes along with her colleagues Vicky and Fiona.
- Shobna Gulati as Fiona (series 1), a midwife at the hospital, who holds parenting classes along with her colleagues Vicky and Geraldine.
- Daniel 'Danny' Breeze as Jude, son of Neil and Susie. His mother's girlfriend is Kim, who works as a teaching assistant at the school he attends. He's later named as the father of Rosie's baby daughter Dinah and he is also the half-brother to his dad Neil and Kim's daughter Emily. In series 2, Jude and Rosie are in a romantic relationship, they are expecting their second child. He passed his re-sat exams, and plans to attend night school to study for his A-Levels exams while he's working. He delivered his second child while he, Rosie and Dinah were in a broken down lift. Rosie gave birth to their second daughter named Davina. He, Rosie and their children are now living at Rosie's father's flat after tensions between his mum and her new partner Claire.
- Lily Mae as Ellie Manning, Rick and Diane's daughter
- Lewis Hardaker as Sam Manning, Rick and Diane's young son
- Victoria Carling as Emma Lambert, Simon's mother.
- Mina Anwar as Amita, Jasmin's mother
- Claire Cooper as Claire (series 2), is in a relationship with Susie. She is godmother to Rosie and Jude's daughter Dinah after Susie requested it to make Claire feel welcome into the family. Claire and Susie plan to travel but face tensions between Jude and Rosie.
- Ashley McGuire as Annette Harris (series 1)
- Hannah Waddingham as Dr Stone (series 2), works as a doctor at the hospital with Geraldine and Vicky.

== Episodes ==
=== Series overview ===
Series	Episodes	Originally aired	
Series	Episodes	First aired	Last aired
1	6	5 August 2014	9 September 2014
2	6	3 May 2016	7 June 2016

=== Series 1 (2014) ===
No.	Title	Directed by	Written by	Original release date	UK viewers (millions)
1	"Episode 1"	Kay Mellor	Kay Mellor	5 August 2014	5.07
At the local parentcraft class, six pregnant women and their partners are preparing for the arrival of their babies. Housewife Diane, schoolgirl Rosie, newlywed Jasmin, businesswoman Roanna, midwife Vicky, and blog writer and teaching assistant Kim each have their own issues to deal with. Diane and husband Rick are expecting their miracle child having been told they would never conceive. But a late scan reveals it is twins, and with mounting pressure on unemployed Rick to provide for his family, he turns to robbing a bank. Meanwhile, fifteen-year-old Rosie is hiding her pregnancy from everyone – her dad, the school and even her baby's mystery father. Alone and frightened, she turns to Kim's pregnancy blog for support. She goes into labour alone, rushing to the hospital and gives birth to baby Dinah. Rosie's father is involved in a road traffic accident.
2	"Episode 2"	Kay Mellor	Kay Mellor	12 August 2014	5.30
With her husband on the run from the police, Diane struggles to cope with the consequences of Rick's actions. Upset and alone, she turns to Roanna for support. But the stress causes her to go into early labour and she rushes to hospital. Unknown to Diane, Rick is hiding out at Jasmin and Dev's house. But when the police turn up, Jasmin is shocked to learn the real reason Rick is there. With no way to turn, Rick steals Dev's van and flees to the top of a multi-storey car park, where he threatens to jump. Dev finally convinces him to come down when he tells Rick his twins have been born. Meanwhile, in the aftermath of Rosie's dad's accident, Kim feels increasingly responsible for her. She wants to invite Rosie to temporarily live with them in Susie's house with Jude, but Susie will not allow it. Kim leaves and goes to live with Neil, the father of her baby, in his flat.
3	"Episode 3"	Neasa Hardiman	Kay Mellor	19 August 2014	5.75
When Roanna's ex-husband cancels her credit cards, she enters the offices of the business she started with him and helps herself to half the money from the safe. With their baby due any day, Roanna suggests going to Simon's parents for help. Roanna has never actually met them and Simon seems reluctant as they do not know Roanna is in her mid 40s. Jasmin has a visit from Jack, a colleague she had an affair with the night before her wedding, causing her due date to be questioned Rosie's dad is still in hospital and social services plan to take her to a mother and baby hostel. When Rosie threatens to run away with her baby if she is forced to go to the hostel, Kim reluctantly invites her to live in Neil's flat with her. Meanwhile Rick is under arrest and awaiting bail, leaving Diane to cope alone as their baby girl Hope fights for her life with an infection.
4	"Episode 4"	Neasa Hardiman	Kay Mellor	26 August 2014	5.62
With Kim, Rosie and baby Dinah staying at Neil's flat, Kim and Neil struggle to ignore their feelings for each other and their secret threatens to bubble to the surface when Rosie sees them kissing. Rosie has a shock when she visits her dad in hospital to tell him he is a grandad. He asks about Rosie's mum, forgetting she has died, and nurses tell Rosie he has suffered a brain injury. With her own baby's arrival looming, Vicky gives Dr Bellingham an ultimatum - marry me or I'll leave you. He seems reluctant to get married but will not tell Vicky why. Elsewhere in the hospital Jasmin is unhappy when she is told they might have to induce her labour early and she confides in Vicky about her 'honeymoon' baby. Roanna struggles with becoming a new mum all over again and the baby blues threaten to eclipse the joy of baby Sonny's arrival. Meanwhile, baby Hope is suffering from jaundice and Diane is torn between being in hospital for Hope and taking care of her family at home.
5	"Episode 5"	Sarah O'Gorman	Kay Mellor	2 September 2014	5.84
Jasmin is furious as Dr Bellingham induces her labour early. The baby looks unnaturally white, causing a rift in hers and Dev's Indian family. Things go from bad to worse when she discovers Jack's in the hospital following his fight with Dev. Dr Bellingham is unhappy with Vicky when Jasmin tells a nurse that Dr Bellingham is the father of Vicky's baby. The other nurses were unaware. Roanna and Simon move into his parents' house and Roanna feels torn when she visits her daughter Katie, who rejects her. Susie, Kim and Neil's relationship is strained in the aftermath of Rosie's revelation that Jude is the father of her baby and Kim tries to mend the fractured family. Meanwhile an anxious Diane and Rick are hopeful as baby Hope is taken off the ventilator.
6	"Episode 6"	Sarah O'Gorman	Kay Mellor	9 September 2014	5.85
A twinge in Vicky's abdomen causes panic and her Parentcraft friends think she is in labour. But all is not as it seems and Dr Bellingham is forced to confront his feelings for Vicky. When he confesses he married an African woman for money as a young, poor student, Vicky questions whether she can forgive him. He confesses he wants to get married but needs to find and divorce this woman first. Tensions build as Kim and Susie try to make their relationship work and with Jude, Rosie and baby Dinah living together at Neil's flat, things get even more complicated when Rosie spends the night with Jude again and throws away her contraceptive. When Simon throws a surprise party for Roanna, Simon's father Jonathan gives her perfume she has not worn in years, revealing they once had an affair. Jasmin and Dev struggle with the challenges of parenthood and tiredness causes Dev to accidentally leave the baby in the car while shopping. He is photographed and published in a local newspaper. Meanwhile, Diane and Rick are preparing to finally take baby Hope home. Rick is distracted by his impending court hearing. He wants to be with his children.

=== Series 2 (2016) ===
In September 2014, it was announced that In the Club has been renewed for a second series for another six episodes in 2015. Creator Kay Mellor has said: "I'm absolutely delighted for Rollem Productions to be commissioned to produce a second series of In the Club for BBC One. On a personal note, the whole experience from script to screen was such a positive one for me. It's going to be a bit of a juggling process as I'd love to bring all the characters back but I also want to introduce some new stories. One thing’s for sure, I can’t wait to start the whole process again." BBC One controller Charlotte Moore also mentions: "BBC One viewers really took the characters to their hearts and it was exciting to see the show build across the six episodes. Kay Mellor's story about a group of pregnant women celebrated life in all its joy and tragedy and I'm looking forward to the delivery of series two." Filming for the second series will take place in Leeds in 2015. It was announced in 2015 that Series 2 would air in 2016.

Kay Mellor directed the first two episodes. Her daughter Gaynor Faye (Credited as Gaynor Mellor) wrote Episode 2 alongside Kay Mellor, while Nick Hopkins co-wrote Episode 3 with Kay Mellor.

No.	Title	Directed by	Written by	Original release date	UK viewers (millions) (Note: Sourced directly from BARB)
1 (7)	"Episode 1"	Kay Mellor	Kay Mellor	3 May 2016	5.42
Kim is struggling to be the perfect mum, and her relationship with Neil is in jeopardy. As she prepares to see her ex, Susie, for the first time since they split, she is shocked to discover Neil has been keeping things from her. Meanwhile, a hospital visit reveals devastating news for Jasmin and Dev - one of their twins is smaller and dying, and nurses advise they abort one of them or both may die. Jasmin is determined to see if both babies can survive. Shelly is a young woman in her mid-20s who is carrying a surrogate for Andrew and Nathan - a gay couple her mother, Maxine, cleans for. Maxine finds a newborn abandoned baby in the toilets.
2 (8)	"Episode 2"	Kay Mellor	Kay Mellor and Gaynor Faye	10 May 2016	4.98
Roanna's struggling to find a job and with money running out she reluctantly turns to her ex-husband for help, ends up kissing him and lies about it to Simon. It is only a matter of time before all her secrets come spilling out. Rosie gives birth to her baby while stuck in a lift with Jude.
3 (9)	"Episode 3"	Jane Prowse	Kay Mellor and Nick Hopkins	17 May 2016	4.60
When Diane needs to take baby Hope to a hospital appointment, as she knows all her information and Rick does not, she is forced to leave the children she is childminding in the house with Rick. One of them falls off the bed and injures her arm, causing her to need to go to hospital and revealing to the parent of the girl that Diane had abandoned the children. An anxious Jasmin and Dev find out if the laser treatment to separate their twins and keep them both alive has worked. Meanwhile it is payday for Shelly as she goes into labour.
4 (10)	"Episode 4"	Jane Prowse	Kay Mellor	24 May 2016	4.39
An anxious Andrew and Nathan prepare to bring baby Sebastian home. The abandoned baby is revealed to be Maxine's. She has not told anybody except Shelly. The baby is going to be adopted by a young couple, but Maxine cannot bear to never see her baby again, so she plots with Shelly to swap Andrew and Nathan's baby with Maxine's baby, so she can continue to see it. Maxine's life is thrown into chaos when her husband tells her he is on his way home and she had a very unexpected baby while he was away. Maxine reveals to the nurses that the abandoned baby was hers and the nurses tell her she can take it home, so she is forced to swap the babies back.
5 (11)	"Episode 5"	Jane Prowse	Kay Mellor	31 May 2016	4.84
A mother Vicky is helping to give birth dies suddenly after having the baby. Vicky has been drinking heavily to cope with the stress of raising a baby and not having Chris (Dr Bellingham) to help, as he has gone to Africa to find the woman he married. The Coroner tells the court that Vicky was not at fault, so she can go back to work. Roanna is horrified when Ray tells her that Katie did not come home last night and it is revealed she has started seeing Simon.
6 (12)	"Episode 6"	Audrey Cooke	Kay Mellor	7 June 2016	4.95
Kim decides she cannot go back to work; she and Neil decide to take in Rosie and Jude and their daughters until they can get a council flat. Jasmin and Dev are busy preparing for their daughter Amber's Hindu naming ceremony. After Vicky checks on the twins, Jasmin is rushed into hospital. The two grandmothers bring all the preparations for Amber's ceremony to the prayer room in the hospital, where all the guests arrive. Vicky tells Chris he must choose between his job offer in Singapore and his family. Shelly has not yet signed the form giving the baby to Andrew and Nathan. Simon returns to see his father in the hospital, injured when he ran in front of Roanna's car and she accidentally hit him. Roanna cares for her young son, while her ex-husband Raysticks to her like glue. He shows her a pregnancy test found at home; Roanna realizes her daughter is pregnant with Simon's baby. Roanna tells Simon's mother about the past event, and the present car accident, which she believes is her fault. Dev and Jasmin enter the prayer room with their two boys.

== International broadcast ==
In Australia, the series premiered on 4 May 2015 on BBC First.
