= Victoria Sugden =

Fictional character from Emmerdale

- Emmerdale character
- Isabel Hodgins as Victoria Sugden
- Portrayed by: Jessica Heywood (1994–1997); Hannah Midgley (1997–2006); Isabel Hodgins (2006–present)
- Duration: 1994–present
- First appearance: Episode 1856; 31 March 1994
- Introduced by: Keith Richardson
- Crossover appearances: Corriedale (2026)
- Hannah Midgley played Victoria from 1997 to 2006
In-universe information
- Other names: Victoria Barton
- Occupation: B&B assistant; Receptionist; Shop assistant; Chef; Barmaid
- Family: Sugden
- Father: Jack Sugden
- Mother: Sarah Sugden
- Stepmother: Diane Sugden
- Brothers: Andy Sugden (adoptive)
- Half-brothers: Jackie Merrick; Robert Sugden; John Sugden
- Husband: Adam Barton (2015–2020)
- Sons: Harry Sugden
- Grandfathers: Jacob Sugden
- Grandmothers: Annie Sugden
- Uncles: Joe Sugden
- Aunts: Peggy Skilbeck
- Nephews: Sebastian White; Jack Sugden (adoptive)
- Nieces: Sarah Sugden (adoptive)
- First cousins: Sam Skilbeck; Sally Skilbeck
- Other relatives: Sam Pearson

Victoria Sugden (also Barton) is a fictional character from the British ITV soap opera Emmerdale. She was originally portrayed by Jessica Heywood (1994-1997) and Hannah Midgley (1997-2006). The role was recast to Isabel Hodgins, who made her first appearance on 12 October 2006. Victoria is currently the longest serving female character on the soap. In February 2026, Hodgins temporarily left the soap to go on maternity leave.

Her storylines have included surviving an explosion which she caused, being put in psychiatric care, being bullied at school, romancing Daz Eden (Luke Tittensor), marrying Adam Barton (Adam Thomas), accidentally running over Ashley Thomas (John Middleton), coping when Adam goes on the run, falling in love with Adam's brother Matty (Ash Palmisciano), being the victim of rape during a night out in April 2019, leading to her pregnancy, giving birth to a son named Harry, and finding out she has a long-lost half brother called John (Oliver Farnworth).

== Characterisation ==
On her character profile on the ITV website, it notes that growing up, Victoria "was easily led by her peers", but nowadays, she "knows how to stand up for herself". Victoria is billed as an "honest, fun, sarcastic, out-spoken, confident" character who enjoys socialising. It adds that she is "not afraid to use her sharp wit", and that she enjoys bossing her boyfriends around, and that if Victoria had one wish, it would be for an easy life.

== Development ==
=== Rape ===
In 2019, producers of Emmerdale announced a special episode in which they planned to "experiment with non-linear storytelling and flashbacks", where it was confirmed that multiple characters' lives will "change for good" on a night out. It was later confirmed that the episode would explore Victoria getting raped. After Victoria is raped by Lee, actress Hodgins appeared on This Morning to speak about the storyline. She stated that it has been the "grittiest" storyline she has been involved in to date, and although it was a "journey", she enjoyed being part of the story from an acting perspective. Presenter Phillip Schofield asked if she felt pressure portraying a victim of rape, to which she stated that she "massively" felt it. She explained that due to the relevance of an issue-led storyline which "happens to thousands of men and women", herself and the producers had a "big responsibility" to cover it well. To prepare for the storyline, Hodgins spoke with real-life victims, who recalled their experiences with rape to the actress. She stated that they were brave for being able to share their stories with her, noting that some were similar to her character's experience. Hodgins also spoke about the lack of support that Victoria receives from Robert, stating: "She's in one of the hardest positions someone can find themselves in, and who do you need to support you? Your family. So when Robert isn't supportive, that breaks her heart. Robert's her brother, she needs him there, she wants him there." In real life, Hodgins cut her "very thick, curly, unruly hair" due to wanting a different appearance, and when she told producers, they replied that her short hair "ties in with the story". She joked that life is "so much easier" due to the shortened time spent by hairstylists on set. Hodgins told producers to make her look "as awful" as they could possibly make her in the scenes where she realises she has been raped. She stated that in that scene, she was embarrassed to cry, since she has never been given the opportunity to have overly emotional scenes on the soap. While appearing on Loose Women, Hodgins recalled: "Afterwards when [the director] said cut, I just threw a blanket over my head. They asked what's going on and I said 'I'm embarrassed'". She noted that the scenes were "challenging" for her. Hodgins also detailed that the production team had to "negotiate" what they could show of the attack, since Emmerdale is transmitted before the 9pm watershed. She explained that they wanted to "get the message across [that] it was a brutal horrendous attack", while also respecting the watershed guidelines.

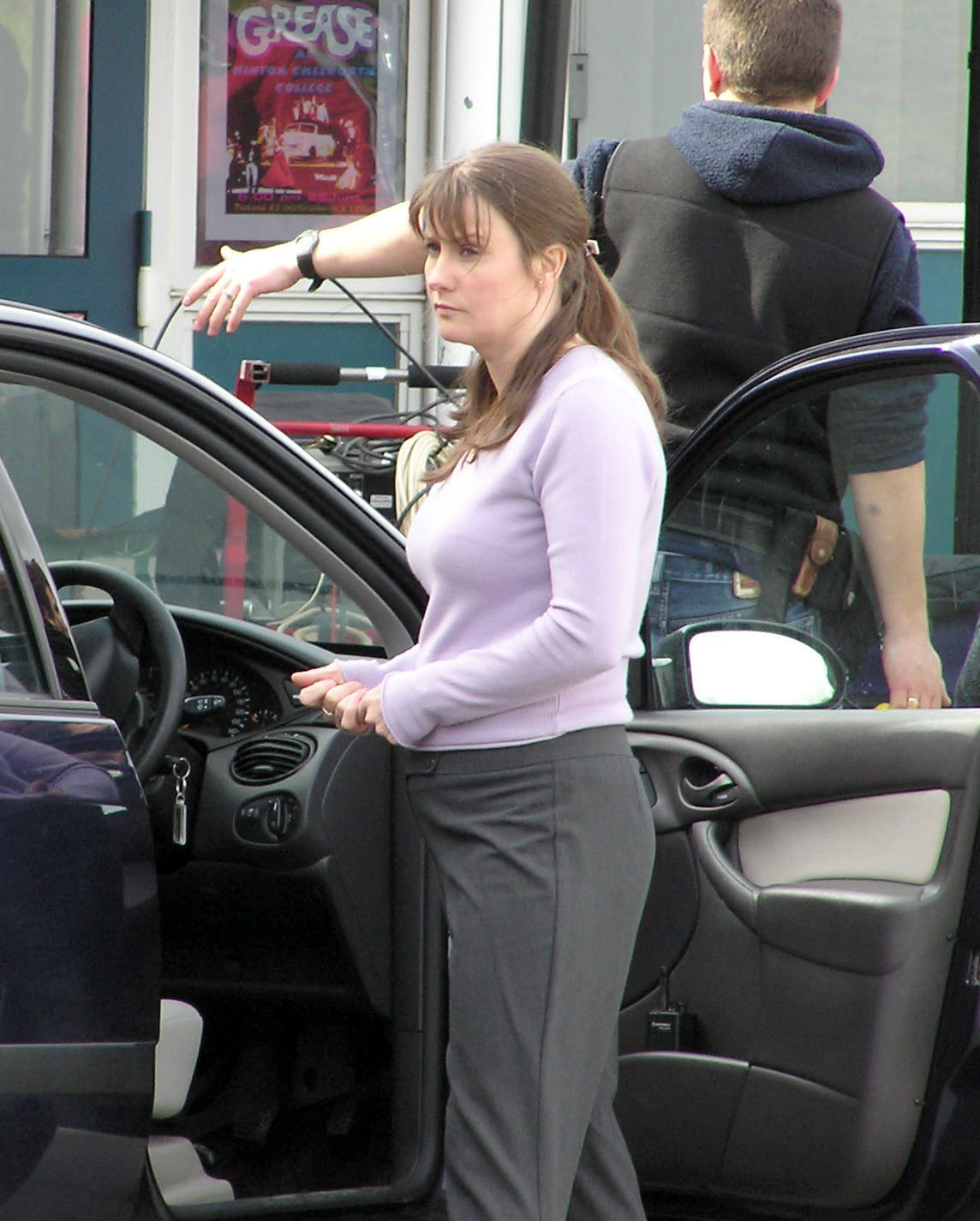
Susan Cookson portrays Wendy Posner, the mother of Victoria's rapist.

Lee's mother Wendy arrives in the village to confront Victoria, as she believes that Victoria is lying. Hodgins explains that Victoria is "shocked and scared" due to Wendy's arrival, and that immediately after meeting her, "Victoria knows that Wendy is an enemy". Hodgins notes that Wendy "has got her son's interests at heart", but since her beliefs contradict Victoria's experience, she knows it will be difficult to interact with Wendy "from the off". Victoria receives defence from her friends and family, but is "left feeling a little bit shellshocked" and "crumbles" due to not expecting Wendy's confrontation. Wendy brings Lee with her, and since it is the first time she has seen him since the rape, she "feels genuine fear", especially since they know where she works and lives, and can show up at any time. Hodgins states that Victoria hates having "no control" over the situation, adding that the village being so small means that she is easy to find. A "harrowing twist" and "new trauma" for Victoria was later confirmed when it was revealed that she would discover she is pregnant with Lee's baby. Victoria decides to keep the baby, and feels that when it comes to informing Lee and Wendy, "it's none of their business". Hodgins states that Victoria is "more than happy" to raise the baby on her own, as she fears the pair will either "bully her into getting a termination", or that Lee may want to be involved. When Wendy moves to the village, Hodgins states that her character will feel "exhausted" and "frustrated" due to Wendy not allowing her to move emotionally to "the next chapter of her life". She explains that Victoria tries not to be too stressed due to her pregnancy, but that "hating someone is exhausting". Wendy's house is vandalised due to her reputation as the mother and defender of a rapist, to which Victoria feels "a little bit guilty". Due to her confrontations with Wendy and Wendy's vandalism, Victoria feels like the pair of them are "being punished" for what Lee has done. Hodgins stated: "She thinks surely the best thing to happen would be for Wendy to leave and then they can both have a nice life."

=== Becoming a mother ===
Following the decision to keep the baby, Victoria goes into labour in the episode transmitted on 31 December 2019, New Year's Eve. Prior to filming the scenes, Hodgins stated that she is finding it "nerve-wracking", accrediting her nerves to the fact she had never given birth in real life. She approached her sister, who has had two children, as well as Emmerdale co-star Charley Webb, a mother of three, for advice. Also in preparation, she used a day off from work to watch the Channel 4 documentary series One Born Every Minute, as well as birthing vlogs on YouTube. She added: "I take my hat off to anyone who's had a baby – well done, you are amazing!" Speaking about her character's maternal skills, she opined that Victoria would be a good mother, labelling her "mother earth". However, she explained that it "takes a village to raise a child", and if she shuts people out due to her rape ordeal, she may struggle to cope. She expressed her wishes for Victoria's journey with birthing to be "smooth sailing", due to her hard times in recent months, adding: "She can't take any more!" Following the scenes being filmed, Hodgins admitted that she was "exhausted". She described the filming process as "honestly the most exhausting day in [her] Emmerdale history", and stated that she went to sleep immediately after returning home. She joked that she had "earned her money that day" due to the " fake pushing, grunting and moaning". Hodgins found the birthing vlogs helpful, as it showed her that the "intense pain" of childbirth comes from within. She attempted to emulate the behaviour that she saw in the videos, since she "wanted the scenes to look real". On working with a real baby, she stated that she was not phased, since she has experience working with babies on set. However, despite her experience, she tried hard to interact with the baby as accurately as possible, so that viewers would not think "oh, she's clearly never had a baby before", as she felt that "would have detracted away from the enormous moment when Victoria meets the baby". Hodgins joked that she would miss wearing the fake baby bump, since it kept her warm in the winter, but expressed her excitement at "the next chapter" of Victoria's story.

== Storylines ==
Victoria is first introduced on 31 March 1994 after being born to Jack Sugden (Clive Hornby) and Sarah Connolly (then Madeleine Howard). When Victoria stops breathing due to a hole in her heart, she requires an operation, and later makes a full recovery. Andy Hopwood (Kelvin Fletcher) visits the farm with other children from a care home and becomes friends with Victoria's brother Robert (Christopher Smith), and the Sugdens eventually adopt him. The Sugdens struggle financially so Richie Carter (Glenn Lamont) becomes their new lodger; Sarah and Richie begin an affair and she left Jack for him, moving into Pear Tree Cottage together. Jack and Sarah (now Alyson Spiro) battle for custody of the children and Sarah wins custody of Victoria. Victoria collapses and is rushed to hospital, where she is diagnosed with a ruptured appendix. Times are difficult for the Sugdens but life is made easier by Jack's relationship with Woolpack landlady, Diane Blackstock (Elizabeth Estensen).

Victoria befriends Kayleigh Gibbs (Lily Jane Stead) at school and helps get her father, Martin Crowe (Graeme Hawley) together with Louise Appleton (Emily Symons). The girls misbehave, gatecrashing Jamie Hope's (Alex Carter) rave and starting a campaign of terror against pensioner Edna Birch (Shirley Stelfox), culminating in Edna slapping Victoria. They also tell Aaron Livesy (Danny Webb) about Carl King's (Tom Lister) one-night stand with Del Dingle (Hayley Tamaddon). Victoria (now played by Isabel Hodgins) returns from Annie in Spain, later than expected, prompting Jack and Diane to worry but returns safely. Victoria and Kayleigh go clubbing but Kayleigh leaves early. Victoria flirts with an older boy and he tries to force himself on her but Billy Hopwood (David Crellin) stops him. Billy drives her home but his brakes fail, due to Kelly Windsor (Adele Silva) sabotaging them, and they crash into a lake. Victoria almost drowns, only escaping as Jack, Andy and Daz arrive. Jack blames Billy until Victoria told him that Billy had saved her life. Victoria's fear of water returns to haunt her on a canoeing trip where she freaks out and hits her instructor, Christian Schwarz and is suspended as a result.

Victoria searches for the truth about Sarah Sugden's (Alyson Spiro) death, but nobody is willing to discuss it. Jack is evasive, but Jasmine Thomas (Jenna-Louise Coleman) shows her an article in the Hotten Courier about Sarah's death seven years earlier. She then investigates after Jack becomes more and more evasive. She tracks down Richie who tells her Jack was not responsible but she doesn't believe him and on her return to the village, she steals a can of petrol from the garage and douses the house with it, threatening to set the place alight unless the truth is told. Andy confesses but when Jack tries to clean Victoria's bloody head after a fall with water from the hot tap on a flannel, it makes the house explode. The Sugdens escape, assisted by Billy and Jonny Foster (Richard Grieve). Victoria is charged and placed in psychiatric care, which gets her bullied at school. Andy is arrested and jailed for three years but eventually freed. When Andy begins beating his ex-wife, Jo (Roxanne Pallett), Victoria refuses to have anything to do with him.

While messing around with other local teens, Victoria falls through the ice and nearly drowns. While under the water, Victoria finds a corpse which is later identified as missing police officer Shane Doyle (Paul McEwan). Annie informs the family of Jack's death in February 2009, leaving them devastated. Daz admits he will always be there for her and resultantly they begin sleeping together, despite the fact Daz is dating Scarlett Nicholls (Kelsey-Beth Crossley). Victoria is hurt when Daz decides to remain with Scarlett and tells him she is pregnant but it turns out to be a lie. Scarlett soon finds out the truth when Daz jealously attacks Aaron (now Danny Miller), after catching him and Victoria together. Victoria befriends Hannah Barton (Grace Cassidy), daughter of the new tenants at Butler's Farm but Kayleigh does not like her and begins bullying Hannah. Eventually, Victoria tires of this behaviour and cuts Kayleigh out of her life. She also makes friends with Amy Wyatt (Chelsea Halfpenny) and they soon become close friends. Alex Moss (Kurtis Stacey) the new farmhand at Butler's Farm arrives and they become a couple. Alex's incessant flirting with other women drives Victoria to dump him. When she feels she has made a mistake, Victoria tries to get Alex back but is horrified to discover he is involved with Moira Barton (Natalie J. Robb). During this time Victoria buys Betty Eagleton's (Paula Tilbrook) house on the condition that she and Alan Turner (Richard Thorp) stay on as tenants and Victoria agrees. Victoria begins a relationship with Adam Barton (Adam Thomas) but it breaks down when she find he is involved in illegal activities with Robbie Lawson (Jamie Shelton).

Victoria later provides Val Pollard (Charlie Hardwick) with a shoulder to cry on when she discovers that she may be HIV positive. Victoria tries to urge Val to tell her husband Eric (Chris Chittell), but it takes a few weeks to tell Eric. Victoria is later stunned when she discovers that Diane and Eric slept together after Val reveals their secret to the regulars of The Woolpack. Victoria, however, sticks up for Diane. She and Eric later rush to the scene when Val sustains a fall in the village and cuts her knee. Victoria befriends newcomer Finn Barton (Joe Gill), who reveals that he is gay and has feelings for David Metcalfe (Matthew Wolfenden), who owns the local shop. Robert (now played by Ryan Hawley) returns to the village in October with fiancée Chrissie White (Louise Marwood), her father Lawrence (John Bowe), and her teenage son Lachlan (Thomas Atkinson) in tow. Initially, Victoria is, like a majority of the village, bitter towards Robert, but as time passes, she warms to him again and comes to accept his return along with Andy. Victoria then restarts her relationship with Adam as he attempts to get her back by buying her a puppy, and cooking naked in The Woolpack kitchen. Victoria attends Robert and Chrissie's wedding, but it ends in tragedy when Andy discovers Katie's deceased body at Wylie's Farm; she had been pushed on to some loose floorboards by Robert. Victoria supports Andy as he attempts to commit suicide only hours after Katie's funeral. She pleads for him to see hope, along with Diane, Chrissie and Robert. Andy later goes to stay with the Whites at Home Farm.

Victoria is heartbroken to learn that Adam has slept with local vet Vanessa Woodfield (Michelle Hardwick), and has impregnated her. She goes on a downward spiral, and slaps Vanessa in the street when she sees her. The following day, Adam notices Victoria attempting to drive her car, knowing that she has not passed her driving test and does not have a provisional license, and tries to stop her. She does not listen, and as she drives off, she runs over Ashley Thomas (John Middleton). He appears to be fine, however, he later collapses and is comatose. Victoria is terrified she will be imprisoned, so Adam gives her a false alibi. However, Ashley's alcoholic ex-wife Laurel (Charlotte Bellamy) drunkenly announces that Ashley has died while in hospital, unaware that he is still comatose. Victoria cannot deal with her guilt and hands herself in to the police, and she is arrested. She is later released, and is delighted to hear that Ashley is alive. Ashley later learns that he now has epilepsy following the accident. Adam and Victoria rekindle their relationship and decide to run away and get married, with the help of Aaron. Robert and Andy are furious to discover this, but Adam and Victoria leave before they can stop them. Victoria is attacked at the scrapyard by Holly Barton's (Sophie Powles) drug dealer, but she fights back. A week later, Victoria accidentally sprays Finn after mistaking him as the attacker.

Victoria is scared to find a man had broken into her Diddy Diner truck, and even more so when the culprit knew her. She is shocked but pleased when the man turns out to be Hannah Barton, who had transitioned into a man and went by the name Matty Barton (Ash Palmisciano). Matty reveals that Moira was unaccepting about the change and has thrown him out. Matty makes the decision to return to Manchester, despite Victoria's offers to allow him to stay with her. She drops Matty off at the train station when Cain fails to convince him to stay. After being beaten up, Matty decides to come back and stay with Moira at Butler's farm. On a night out with her friends, Victoria is raped by Lee Posner (Kris Mochrie). She reports the rape to the police, and when his mother Wendy (Susan Cookson) arrives in the village to confront Victoria on what Wendy believes are lies, Victoria begins to leave the house less often. Wendy moves to the village with son Luke (Max Parker), and Victoria is shocked to recognise him, since the pair have flirted before. Although she struggles due to his connection with Lee, the pair begin dating.

Victoria later begins a relationship with David however this ends in November 2022 when he lies to her over a speeding ticket he was given but had put in her name.

In October 2023 Victoria develops feelings for David's stepson Jacob, their feelings for each other ultimately cause David to leave Emmerdale for London. For a while afterwards they are in a relationship however they split up in April 2024 due to the age gap between them and concerns their relationship is limiting Jacob's future prospects.

In August 2024, Victoria discovers she has a long-lost half brother called John and attempts to establish contact with him however initially he shows no interest in doing so.

== Reception ==
The accident involving Victoria and Billy was nominated for "Spectacular Scene of the Year" at the 2007 British Soap Awards. At the 2009 ceremony, Hodgins was nominated for Best Young Performance, and the scene of Victoria falling through the ice won the award for Most Spectacular Scene. In 2014, Matt Bramford from What to Watch put Victoria on his list of the 18 best recastings in British and Australian soap operas and commented, "Cutie Hannah Midgley played Victoria brilliantly for 10 years".
