= John Marquez (actor) =

British actor and writer (born 1970)

- Born: John Charles Marquez; 5 June 1970 (age 56); Coventry, England
- Occupations: Actor and writer
- Years active: 1996–present
- Relatives: Martin Marquez (brother); Ramona Marquez (niece)

John Charles Marquez (born 5 June 1970) is a British actor and writer. He is best known for his role as PC Joseph Penhale in ITV drama series Doc Martin (2007–2022) and Ray Wilson in BBC One's drama In the Club (2014–2016).

== Personal life ==
Marquez was born in Coventry, England. He is the brother of actor Martin Marquez and uncle of Ramona Marquez.

== Filmography ==
- Una vida y dos mandados (1997)
- Jonathan Creek (1997) as Supermarket Manager
- The Trial of Tony Blair (2007)
- Doc Martin (2007–2022)
- Hotel Babylon (2008)
- In the Club (2014–2016)
- Death in Paradise (2017)
- Porridge (2017)
- Britannia (2019)
