= Messiah (British TV series) =

2001-2008 UK television series directed by Boris Starling

- Genre: Crime drama
- Created by: Boris Starling
- Starring: Ken Stott; Neil Dudgeon; Frances Grey; Michelle Forbes; Kieran O'Brien; Art Malik; Marc Warren; Jamie Draven
- Country of origin: United Kingdom
- Original language: English
- No. of series: 5
- No. of episodes: 11

Production
- Executive producer: Lizzie Mickery
- Running time: 75 min (series 1); 90 min (series 2–3); 60 min (series 4–5)
- Production companies: BBC Northern Ireland; CBS Paramount International Television

Original release
- Network: BBC One
- Release: 26 May 2001 – 21 January 2008

Messiah is a British television drama series, broadcast on the BBC One network and is produced as a co-production between BBC Northern Ireland (although the series itself is set in England) and Paramount International Television. Made up of a series of occasional serials, the first, with two parts subtitled The First Killings & The Reckoning, was broadcast in 2001. It has been followed by Messiah 2: Vengeance is Mine (2003), Messiah III: The Promise (2004), Messiah IV: The Harrowing (2005) and most recently Messiah V: The Rapture (2008). The original production was based on a novel by Boris Starling: the subsequent instalments have been written directly for television. Starling has a cameo as a murder victim's corpse in the first serial.

A crime series, it follows the investigations of DCI Red Metcalfe, who often investigates particularly gruesome murders. Metcalfe is played by Scottish actor Ken Stott, and the other main regulars in the series are Kate Beauchamp (Frances Grey), Duncan Warren (Neil Dudgeon) and Metcalfe's wife Susan (Michelle Forbes). The deafness of Forbes' character necessitated both her and Stott learning British Sign Language for their characters' frequent exchanges, with Forbes doing so in six days.

== Cast ==
=== Main ===
- Ken Stott as DCI Red Metcalfe (Series 1–4)
- Frances Grey as DS Kate Beauchamp (Series 1–3)
- Neil Dudgeon as DI Duncan Warren (Series 1–4)
- Michelle Forbes as Susan Metcalfe (Series 1–3)
- Kieran O'Brien as Eric Metcalfe (Series 1–2)
- Art Malik as DCS Michael Emerson (Series 1–2)
- Gillian Taylforth as Helen Warren (Series 1–2)
- Marc Warren as DCI Joseph Walker (Series 5)

=== Other ===
- Edward Woodward as Rev. Stephen Hedges (Series 1)
- Jamie Draven as DS Jez Clifton (Series 1)
- Alun Armstrong as DCI Charlie McIntyre (Series 2)
- Emily Joyce as DS Anna Marchent, née Sarah Herd (Series 2)
- Vincent Regan as DI David Wilby (Series 2)
- Tom Ellis as Dr. Phillip Ryder (Series 3)
- Hugo Speer as DI Jack Price (Series 4)
- Maxine Peake as DS Vickie Clarke (Series 4)
- Daniel Ryan as DS Terry Hedges (Series 5)
- Marsha Thomason as DS Mel Palmer (Series 5)
- Lucinda Raikes as Liza (pathologist) (Series 5)

== Production ==
Messiah I is the only series to be directly adapted from the novel, and deals with a serial killer who sets out to commit twelve murders in the same vein as the Apostles. The screenplay was written by Lizzie Mickery, who also wrote Messiah II and Messiah III. The series was broadcast over a May bank holiday weekend in 2001, on 26 and 27 May. The series does have some major differences to the novel it was adapted from. For example, the final scenes in the novel take place at Easter 1999, traditionally the time when Judas Iscariot hanged himself. However, the events of the final scenes in the series take place on New Year's Eve 2000. In the novel, Red is seen crashing to the floor with his killer before crucifying them, similar to the death of Jesus Christ. However, in the series, Red's killer tries to hang him from his staircase, before Red and his wife manage to overpower him and he falls to his death from a great height. The way in which the killer falls to their death results in them lying on the floor in the shape of a cross. Red meanwhile manages to pull himself to safety. In the novel, Red hands himself in to the police having committed murder, is interviewed by DS Beauchamp and is subsequently sent to jail. However, in the series, Red is seen simply being taken away in a police car to give his side of the story as to how his killer died. Subsequently, he is found to have been at no fault, thus paving the way for the further serials. The novel also shows Red's marriage to his wife, Susan, falling apart and their subsequent split; however, in the series, this does not occur, and Susan appears in two further sequels. Also, it can be noted that the character of Susan is not deaf in the book, but is in the series.

Messiah II was the first original screenplay written for the series, again written by Lizzie Mickery. The plot deals with a serial killer who murders all those implicated in the wrongful imprisonment of their father. The serial was originally scheduled for broadcast on the August bank holiday weekend in 2002, 24 and 25 August, but was pulled at the last moment because of the Soham Murders; it was eventually broadcast in 2003, on 11 and 12 January. Carl Orff's Fortune plango vulnera and O Fortuna were used as trailer music for the series.

Messiah III was again written by Lizzie Mickery. The plot deals with a prison riot, during which a member of Red's team is held hostage and almost killed. A killer then begins to pick off everyone who threatened or harmed that officer. The series was again broadcast across an August bank holiday weekend, being broadcast on 30 and 31 August 2004. The first two pieces of Orff's Carmina Burana are used in the trailer for the series.

Messiah IV was for the first time written by Terry Cafolla. The plot deals with a killer who commits a series of elaborate and strange murders based around the killings of The Divine Comedy by Dante. The series was once again broadcast across an August bank holiday, but for the first time was split into three parts, being broadcast on 28, 29 and 30 August 2005.

Messiah V sees Marc Warren take over as lead actor in the series, appearing as new character DCI Joseph Walker. The series, although loosely connected with the four original series, features an entirely new cast, new writer (this series having been written by Oliver Brown), and largely new format. The plot of this series centres on a massacre in a crack den, followed by an acid attack, the murder of two sisters and a victim discovers with a missing heart. The series was broadcast in January 2008, on 20 and 21 January. The first part of the serial was generally positively received by critics, with The Daily Telegraph stating that despite the show lacking the shock value it had when it first started, the variations on the theme are enough to keep it going, and the directing and pacing remained good. The Herald called the show 'stylishly realised', though also asked why professional detectives would need a priest to figure out the serial killer was sending an apocalyptic message. The Guardian called the plot 'totally loopy' but done well, as well as being frightening.

== Episodes ==
=== Series 1 (2001) ===
No.	Title	Directed by	Written by	Original release date	Viewers (millions)
1	"The First Killings"	Lizzie Mickery	Diarmuid Lawrence	7.42m	26 May 2001
DCI Red Metcalfe is assigned to investigate the death of a chef found hanging from his landing ceiling, having had his tongue cut out and a silver spoon inserted into his mouth. Subsequently, four further victims come to light, including a bishop who has been beaten to death, a student who is found beheaded by his brother in his flat, a man who is found skinned alive in his chair, and a civil servant who is found slashed to death with a machete. The victims are all soon linked to the twelve apostles, and Metcalfe realises he is slowly running out of time before the killer strikes again. Meanwhile, Metcalfe also tries to come to terms with his brother's release, and DI Duncan Warren has money problems.
2	"The Reckoning"	Lizzie Mickery	Diarmuid Lawrence	7.41m	27 May 2001
Six more victims are brutally murdered across London, including one victim previously undiscovered, and DCI Red Metcalfe has little to no leads. As he and the team try to protect any possible targets from the killer, forensic examination of a hair sample found on one of the victims leads Red to believe that DI Duncan Warren is responsible for the murders, unaware the hair sample had been planted by the killer. With Warren in custody and a formal statement having been made about his arrest, Metcalfe goes to see his brother Eric, who has been sent an anonymous letter about his brother. Red then realises that Duncan is not the killer, but before he can tell anyone, is confronted by the real killer in his flat.

=== Series 2 (2003) ===
No.	Title	Directed by	Written by	Original release date	Viewers (millions)
1	"Vengeance is Mine: Part One"	Lizzie Mickery	David Richards	7.72m	11 January 2003
DCI Red Metcalfe's brother is knifed to death in the street. A sadistic serial killer is at large, with each body providing an obscure clue to the fate of the next victim. Metcalfe realises that the killer is seeking bloody vengeance for possible miscarriages of justice. It may be that innocent men have been convicted of murder.
2	"Vengeance is Mine: Part Two"	Lizzie Mickery	David Richards	8.18m	12 January 2003
The killer is striking at the families of officers involved in earlier murder investigations as punishment for police failings. DCI Red Metcalfe reopens those past cases while trying to catch the killer before he strikes again. He also faces a moral dilemma in the case against his brother's killer.

=== Series 3 (2004) ===
No.	Title	Directed by	Written by	Original release date	Viewers (millions)
1	"The Promise: Part One"	Lizzie Mickery	David Drury	7.46m	30 August 2004
Prison inmates riot and murder a hostage. When the injured are transferred to hospital, the murders continue. DCI Red Metcalfe and his team struggle to catch the killer before the death toll rises.
2	"The Promise: Part Two"	Lizzie Mickery	David Drury	7.25m	31 August 2004
The death toll at the hospital continues to rise as the chief suspects are murdered. DCI Red Metcalfe uncovers the unwelcome connection between the victims.

=== Series 4 (2005) ===
No.	Title	Directed by	Written by	Original release date	Viewers (millions)
1	"The Harrowing: Part One"	Terry Cafolla	Paul Unwin	6.60m	28 August 2005
Two women are found brutally murdered, with the words "SAVE ME" written in blood by their corpses. DCI Red Metcalfe and his team have to get inside the head of the killer before he strikes again.
2	"The Harrowing: Part Two"	Terry Cafolla	Paul Unwin	7.08m	29 August 2005
The serial killer continues the killing spree, and leaves a clue: the victims and their fates are inspired by the circles of Hell in Dante's Inferno.
3	"The Harrowing: Part Three"	Terry Cafolla	Paul Unwin	6.85m	30 August 2005
Assisted by an authority on Dante, DCI Red Metcalfe knows the "sin" and "punishment" of the next victim, but struggles to establish how the victims are being chosen. He must locate the killer before the macabre sequence is completed.

=== Series 5 (2008) ===
No.	Title	Directed by	Written by	Original release date	Viewers (millions)
1	"The Rapture: Part One"	Oliver Brown	Harry Bradbeer	5.91m	20 January 2008
Troubled DCI Joseph Walker investigates the gruesome murder of a key witness and his family, whose necks were slit before being posed around the dining table. The defendant in the original case, accused of the prolonged sexual abuse of his daughter, claims that she has false memory syndrome. Elsewhere, in separate incidents, two sisters are dressed in men's clothing and hanged. When a devout Christian has acid poured into her eyes, Joseph suspects that these are religious hate killings.
2	"The Rapture: Part Two"	Oliver Brown	Harry Bradbeer	5.79m	21 January 2008
An attack on a crack house on a run-down council estate sees several drug users brutally slaughtered. Michael Wallace's other daughter insists that her father is innocent of the sexual abuse charges, but she is later found murdered, and with her heart cut out. Joseph, meanwhile, has to consider whether to trust his Palestinian girlfriend.
