= Messiah (Starling novel) =

1999 novel by Boris Starling

- First edition
- Author: Boris Starling
- Language: English
- Genre: Thriller, Mystery novel
- Publisher: HarperCollins
- Publication date: 1999
- Publication place: United Kingdom
- Media type: Print (Paperback)
- Pages: 483 pp
- ISBN: 0-451-40900-0
- OCLC: 42077524
- Followed by: Storm (2000 novel)

Messiah is a thriller novel by British writer Boris Starling, published in 1999. Following the success of the novel, a sequel, Storm (2000), was also released.

The novel became the basis for the popular BBC TV series Messiah, starring Ken Stott, which also had Starling appearing as a corpse.

== Plot summary ==
The novel opens with the discovery of the body of Philip Rhodes, a London caterer, who is found hanging in his underwear from his banister, his tongue cut out and a silver spoon in its place. When the body of the Bishop of Wandsworth, James Cunningham, is found beaten to death, but with his tongue replaced by a silver spoon, DCI Red Metcalfe and his team must discover the pattern behind these killings and save the rest of the men who are destined to be murdered. The novel has many twists and turns and it describes the killings in great detail.

== Reception ==
The Guardian described the novel as being "in the same mood as Se7en, but it makes the film's theology look like Peter and Jane".
