= Boris Starling =

British writer

Boris Starling (born 1969) is a British novelist, screenwriter and newspaper columnist.

== Career ==
Starling has written seven crime novels.

His first book, Messiah, was published in 1999. Notable for its fast pace and high levels of gore, Messiah was a commercial and critical success, reaching both The New York Times and the official UK bestseller lists. It was subsequently adapted for television by the BBC, with Starling taking a cameo role as a murder victim's corpse.

There have been four television sequels broadcast. Messiah I-IV starred Ken Stott in the lead role as DCI Redfern Metcalfe. For Messiah V, Marc Warren took over as DCI Joseph Walker, heading up an entirely new cast. Messiah V was broadcast on BBC1 in January 2008. Starling is listed as series creator of the franchise.

His second book, also a New York Times bestseller, and winner of the W. H. Smith 'Thumping Good Read' Award, was Storm. Set in Aberdeen, Storm begins with a ferry disaster, and follows the subsequent week in the life of Kate Beauchamp, one of the detectives from Messiah, as she tries to find a serial killer while her estranged father heads up the investigation into the ferry sinking.

Starling changed tack substantially with his third novel. Vodka is a sprawling, epic story of Russia immediately after the end of the Soviet Union, and runs several storylines in tandem: the efforts of an American banker, Alice Liddell, to effect the first privatisation in Russian history; the battle between Slav and Chechen gangs for control of Moscow's vodka market; and the hunt for a serial killer who is killing children and draining their blood.

Another shift in period and location came with the publication of Starling's fourth novel, Visibility. Visibility is set in the winter of 1952, when the Great Smog (sometime called the Great Fog) has rolled into London, shutting down most transportation routes and sickening the populace with its noxious haze. Assigned to investigate a suspicious drowning, detective Herbert Smith discovers that the victim, a young biochemist and son of a highly placed government official, had in the hours before his death claimed to be in possession of a discovery that could change the world. Visibility gained good reviews. The Guardian's Maxim Jakubowski called it "mystery at its best", while in the New Statesman Adam LeBor said: "Visibility is an intelligent and thought-provoking book, one that asks lingering questions about the very nature of loyalty and love."

Starling has also written a series of thrillers featuring Franco Patrese, a Pittsburgh homicide detective who later joins the FBI. The first book was published in the UK as 'Soul Murder' and in the US as 'Thou Shalt Kill.' The Pittsburgh Tribune-Review said that the book 'captures the essentials of Pittsburgh better than most natives could... This is a well-imagined thriller, a nice addition to the crowded police-procedural genre, with vivid characters and nimble-but-fitting plot twists.'

The sequel, released as 'City Of Sins' in the UK in October 2011 and as 'City Of The Dead' in the US in April 2012, is set in New Orleans around the time of Hurricane Katrina.

A third novel, 'White Death', was released in December 2012.

Starling has also written:

- 'Unconquerable: The Invictus Spirit' about the men and women who compete in the Invictus Games.
- the popular 'Haynes Explains' series of tongue-in-cheek mini-manuals. The first four (BABIES, TEENAGERS, MARRIAGE and PENSIONERS) were published in September 2016, and a further eight (BRITISH, AMERICANS, GERMANS, FRENCH, CHRISTMAS, PETS, HOME and FOOTBALL) are published in September 2017.
- THE KID, an animated sci-fi reimagining of Charlie Chaplin's THE KID, which is being produced by the French company Superprod and the Luxembourg-based Bidibul.

== Personal life ==
Starling is the great-grandson of the English physiologist Ernest Starling. He was educated at Trinity College, Cambridge, graduating from Cambridge with a first in History.

He began his career as a journalist for several Fleet Street newspapers before working for Control Risks, a firm which assesses the risks to companies of terrorism and political upheaval, and provides services ranging from confidential investigations to kidnap resolution.

In 1996, he appeared on the BBC quiz show Mastermind, where he reached the semi-finals. His specialist topics were comics creator Hergé and his creation Tintin, and The Life and Novels of Dick Francis, who was present at the recording.

He lives in Dorset with his wife, an interior designer, and their children.

His sister Belinda was also an author; her novel The Journal of Dora Damage was published posthumously in the UK and US in late 2007. She died aged 34 in August 2006 of complications following bile duct surgery.

== Bibliography ==
=== As Boris Starling ===
- 1999 Messiah
- 2000 Storm
- 2004 Vodka
- 2006 Visibility
- 2014 The Stay-Behind Cave (eBook only)
- 2017 Unconquerable: The Invictus Spirit
- 2021 The Law of the Heart

=== As Daniel Blake ===
- 2010 Soul Murder (published as Thou Shalt Kill in the US)
- 2011 City Of Sins
- 2012 White Death
