= 15 Days (TV series) =

British television miniseries

15 Days is a four-part British television miniseries starring David Caves, Catherine Tyldesley, Frances Grey and Bruce Herbelin-Earle. It was broadcast on Channel 5 on four consecutive nights from 13 May to 16 May 2019. The series revolves around a young man who is murdered in the first episode; it then rewinds fifteen days to figure out who killed him, and why. The series is an English version of the Welsh original cy:35 Diwrnod (35 Days), written by cy:Siwan Jones.
