= The State Within =

2006 British television series

- Genre: Political thriller
- Created by: Lizzie Mickery; Daniel Percival
- Directed by: Michael Offer; Daniel Percival
- Starring: Jason Isaacs; Ben Daniels; Eva Birthistle; Neil Pearson; Genevieve O'Reilly; Sharon Gless; Noam Jenkins; Ted Whittall; Christopher Bolton; Nigel Bennett
- Music by: Jennie Muskett
- Country of origin: United Kingdom
- Original language: English
- No. of series: 1
- No. of episodes: 6

Production
- Executive producers: Kathryn Mitchell; Jessica Pope
- Producers: Grainne Marmion; Patrick Cassavetti
- Cinematography: David Perrault
- Editors: Nick McPhee; David Head
- Running time: 60 minutes
- Production company: BBC Films

Original release
- Network: BBC One; BBC America
- Release: 2 November – 7 December 2006

The State Within is a six-part British television political thriller series, written and created by Lizzie Mickery and Daniel Percival, that was broadcast on BBC One in the United Kingdom from Thursday, 2 November 2006. The series, directed by Percival and Michael Offer and produced by Grainne Marmion, is a joint production between BBC Films and BBC America that follows Sir Mark Brydon (Jason Isaacs), the British Ambassador to Washington, who is caught in the centre of a political conspiracy threatening to depose Western governments. As such, he must prevent a war, all whilst facing his own personal dilemmas.

On 22 January 2007, the series was released on DVD in the United Kingdom. In the United States, the series premiered during Presidents Day weekend as a three-part miniseries, concluding on 24 February 2007. After being repeated on BBC Four in June 2007 as part of the channel's Conspiracy U.S.A. week of programming, the series subsequently released on Netflix worldwide, where it was edited down into seven 50-minute episodes. The series was subsequently nominated for two Golden Globe Awards in the categories Best Mini-Series or Motion Picture Made for Television and Best Actor - Miniseries or Television Film.

== Plot ==
Lynne Warner (Sharon Gless) is the United States Secretary of Defense, Nicholas Brocklehurst (Ben Daniels) is nominally the British Counsellor External Affairs, but is a Secret Intelligence Service (MI6) agent assigned to embassy duty, and James Sinclair (Alex Jennings) is the former British ambassador to the fictional former Soviet republic of Tyrgyzstan (cf. Kyrgyzstan). This character resembles Craig Murray, the British ambassador who exposed British and American complicity in torture and human rights abuses in Uzbekistan.

== Cast ==
=== Main cast ===
- Jason Isaacs as Sir Mark Brydon; British ambassador to Washington
- Ben Daniels as Nicholas Brocklehurst; an MI6 agent and Counsellor for External Affairs
- Eva Birthistle as Jane Lavery; employee of the Human Rights Commission
- Neil Pearson as Phil Lonsdale; Deputy Head of Mission at the British Embassy
- Genevieve O'Reilly as Caroline Hanley; daughter of the plane victim
- Sharon Gless as Lynne Warner; American Secretary of Defence
- Noam Jenkins as Christopher Styles; Head of Defence Intelligence
- Ted Whittall as Gordon Adair; CEO of the Armitage Corporation
- Christopher Bolton as Vinny Swain
- Nigel Bennett as Colonel Charles Macintyre; president of CMC Secure Operations
- Marnie McPhail as George Blake
- Alex Jennings as James Sinclair; ex-British Ambassador to Tyrgyzan
- Aaron Abrams as Matthew Weiss
- Lennie James as Luke Gardner; an ex-British paratrooper currently on Death Row for murder

=== Supporting cast ===
- Emma Campbell as Sally Davis
- Rahnuma Panthaky as Nasreen Qureshi
- Briony Glassco as Jennifer Grimes
- Louca Tassone as Azzam Sinclair
- Roman Podhora as Vernon Burchill
- Michael Rhoades as Gary Pritchard
- Ron Lea as Carl Garcia
- Patrick Garrow as Brad Godovsky
- David Eisner as Sam Levinson
- Rory O’Shea as news anchor

== Episodes ==
| No. | Title | Directed by | Written by | Original release date | UK viewers (millions) |
|---|---|---|---|---|---|
| 1 | "Episode 1" | Michael Offer | Lizzie Mickery & Daniel Percival | 2 November 2006 | 5.21 |
| 2 | "Episode 2" | Michael Offer | Lizzie Mickery & Daniel Percival | 9 November 2006 | N/A |
| 3 | "Episode 3" | Michael Offer | Lizzie Mickery & Daniel Percival | 16 November 2006 | N/A |
| 4 | "Episode 4" | Daniel Percival | Lizzie Mickery & Daniel Percival | 23 November 2006 | N/A |
| 5 | "Episode 5" | Daniel Percival | Lizzie Mickery & Daniel Percival | 30 November 2006 | N/A |
| 6 | "Episode 6" | Daniel Percival | Lizzie Mickery & Daniel Percival | 7 December 2006 | N/A |
