= Buchan (surname) =

Buchan is a surname. Notable people with the surname include:

- Alastair Buchan (born 1955), British neurologist and researcher in stroke medicine
- Alexander Buchan (disambiguation)
- Alfred L. Buchan (1847–1905), American physician and politician
- Andrew Buchan (born 1979), English stage and television actor
- Angus Buchan (born 1947), Scottish-Zambian farmer, now an evangelist and writer in South Africa
- Bryan Buchan (born 1945), Scottish-born Canadian author
- Charlie Buchan (1891–1960), English football player and writer
- Colin Buchan, Scottish footballer
- David Buchan (1780–1838), Scottish naval officer and Arctic explorer
- Duke Buchan (born 1963), American Ambassador and businessman
- Elizabeth Buchan (born 1948), British writer
- Elspeth Buchan (1738–1791), founder of a Scottish religious sect
- George Buchan of Kelloe (29 May 1775 - 3 January 1856), high ranking civil servant, author and church leader
- James Buchan (footballer) (1881–unknown), Scottish football player
- James Buchan (born 1954), Scottish novelist and journalist
- Janey Buchan (1926–2012), Scottish politician
- John Buchan, 1st Baron Tweedsmuir (1875–1940), Scottish novelist, politician, Governor General of Canada
- John Buchan, 2nd Baron Tweedsmuir (1911–1996), Scottish colonial administrator and soldier
- Martin Buchan (born 1949), Scottish former footballer
- Norman Buchan (1922–1990), Scottish politician
- Perdita Buchan (born 1940), Anglo-American author
- Peter Buchan (1790–1854), Scottish editor, publisher and collector of ballads and folktales
- Ray Buchan (1908–1986), New Zealand cricketer
- Susan Buchan, Baroness Tweedsmuir (1882–1977) British author of novels, children's books and biographies
- Tom Buchan (footballer) (1889–1952), English football player
- Wattie Buchan (born 1956), Scottish punk rock musician
- William Buchan (disambiguation)
