= Buchan (disambiguation) =

Buchan is an area within Aberdeenshire in Scotland

Buchan may also refer to:

== People ==
- Buchan (surname)
- Clan Buchan, Scotland
- Earl of Buchan, originally the ruler of the medieval province of Buchan

== Places in or near Scotland ==
- RAF Buchan, a former Royal Air Force station near Peterhead in Aberdeenshire, now known as Remote Radar Head Buchan
- Buchan Oil Field, east of Aberdeen

== Places in Australia ==
- Buchan, Victoria, a town
- Buchan Caves, a group of caves in Buchan, Victoria

== Other uses ==
- Buchan Hill, West Sussex, England
- The Buchan School on the Isle of Man

== See also ==
- Buchen (disambiguation)
- Buchon (disambiguation)
