= Buchon =

Buchon may refer to:

- Buchón or Hispano Aviación HA-1112-M1L
- Bucheon or Buchon, a city in South Korea
- Mount Buchon a mountain range in San Luis Obispo County, California

People:

- Jean Alexandre Buchon (1791 - 1849), French scholar
- Claude Buchon (born 1949), French cyclist

== See also ==
- Buchan (disambiguation)
- Buchen (disambiguation)
