= Baron Tweedsmuir =

Barony in the Peerage of the United Kingdom

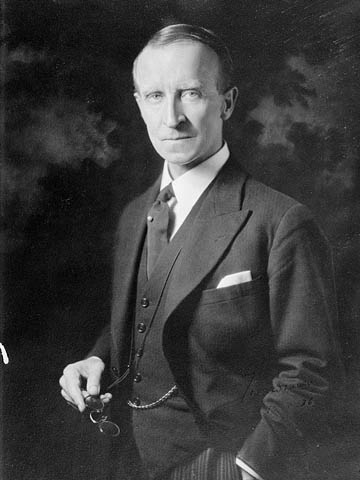
John Buchan, 1st Baron Tweedsmuir

Baron Tweedsmuir, of Elsfield in the County of Oxford, is a title in the Peerage of the United Kingdom. Holders of the title are referred to as Lord Tweedsmuir.

== History ==
The title "Baron Tweedsmuir" was created in 1935 for the author and Unionist politician John Buchan. He served as Governor General of Canada from 1935 to his death in 1940. His eldest son, the second Baron, was the husband of the Conservative politician Lady Tweedsmuir.

As of 2010 the title is held by the second Baron's nephew, the fourth Baron, who succeeded his father in 2008.

The Honourable James Buchan, younger son of the third Baron, is an author.

The first Baron was brought up in the Tweed Valley in the Scottish Borders at Broughton close to the village of Tweedsmuir.

The family seat was Elsfield Manor, near Oxford.

== Barons Tweedsmuir (1935) ==
- John Buchan, 1st Baron Tweedsmuir (1875–1940)
- John Norman Stuart Buchan, 2nd Baron Tweedsmuir (1911–1996)
- William de l'Aigle Buchan, 3rd Baron Tweedsmuir (1916–2008)
- John William de l'Aigle Buchan, 4th Baron Tweedsmuir (b. 1950)

The heir apparent is the present holder's son the Hon. John Alasdair Gawain Buchan (b. 1986).

== Line of Succession ==
- The Right Hon. John Buchan, 1st Baron Tweedsmuir (1875–1940)
  - John Norman Stuart Buchan, 2nd Baron Tweedsmuir (1911–1996)
  - William de l'Aigle Buchan, 3rd Baron Tweedsmuir (1916–2008)
    - John William Howard de l'Aigle Buchan, 4th Baron Tweedsmuir (b. 1950)
      - (1) Hon. John Alasdair Gawain Buchan (b. 1986)
      - (2) Hon. Christopher (Kit) Charles Westray Buchan (b. 1988)
    - (3) Hon. Charles Walter Edward Ralph Buchan (b. 1951)
      - (4) William Edward Francis Ewelme Buchan (b. 1984)
    - (5) Hon. James Ernest Buchan (b. 1954)
      - (6) Nicholas Adam Buchan (b. 1992)
    - (7) Hon. Alexander Edward Buchan (b. 1961)
      - (8) Patrick Charles Julian Buchan (b. 1994)
      - (9) Roland Thomas Lucien Buchan (b. 1997)
  - Hon. Alastair Francis Buchan (1918–1976)
    - (10) David John Brian Washington Buchan (b. 1947)
      - (11) Charles Buchan (b. 1986)
      - (12) Julian Daniel Buchan (b. 1990)
    - (13) Benjamin William Alastair Buchan (b. 1948)
      - (14) Adam Peter Alastair Buchan (b. 1980)

== Arms ==
Coat of arms of Baron Tweedsmuir
Crest A sunflower proper. Escutcheon Azure, a fesse between three lions' heads erased argent. Supporters Dexter: a stag proper attired or collared gules; Sinister: a falcon proper jessed belled and beaked or armed and collared gules. Motto Non inferiora secutus (Not following meaner things)..
