= Bentonite =

Type of claystone, composed of absorbent smectite clay minerals

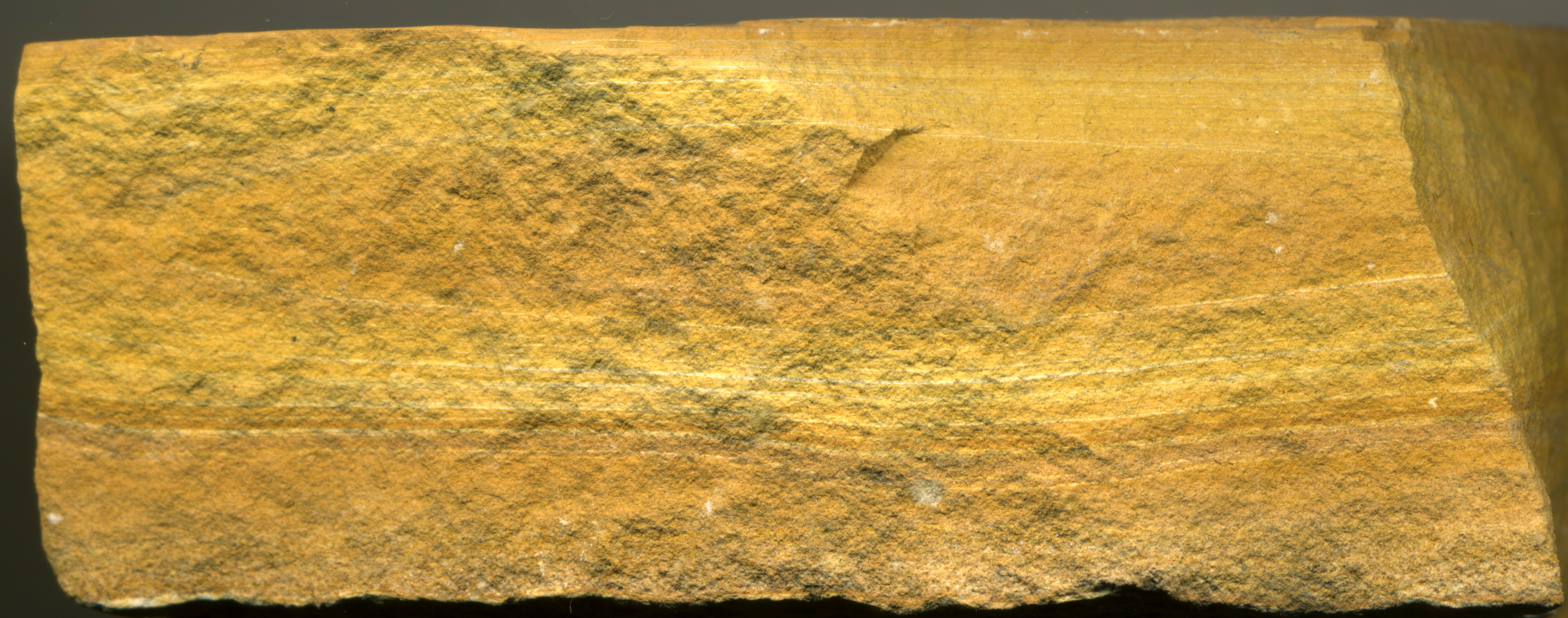
Bentonite layers from an ancient deposit of weathered volcanic ash tuff in Wyoming

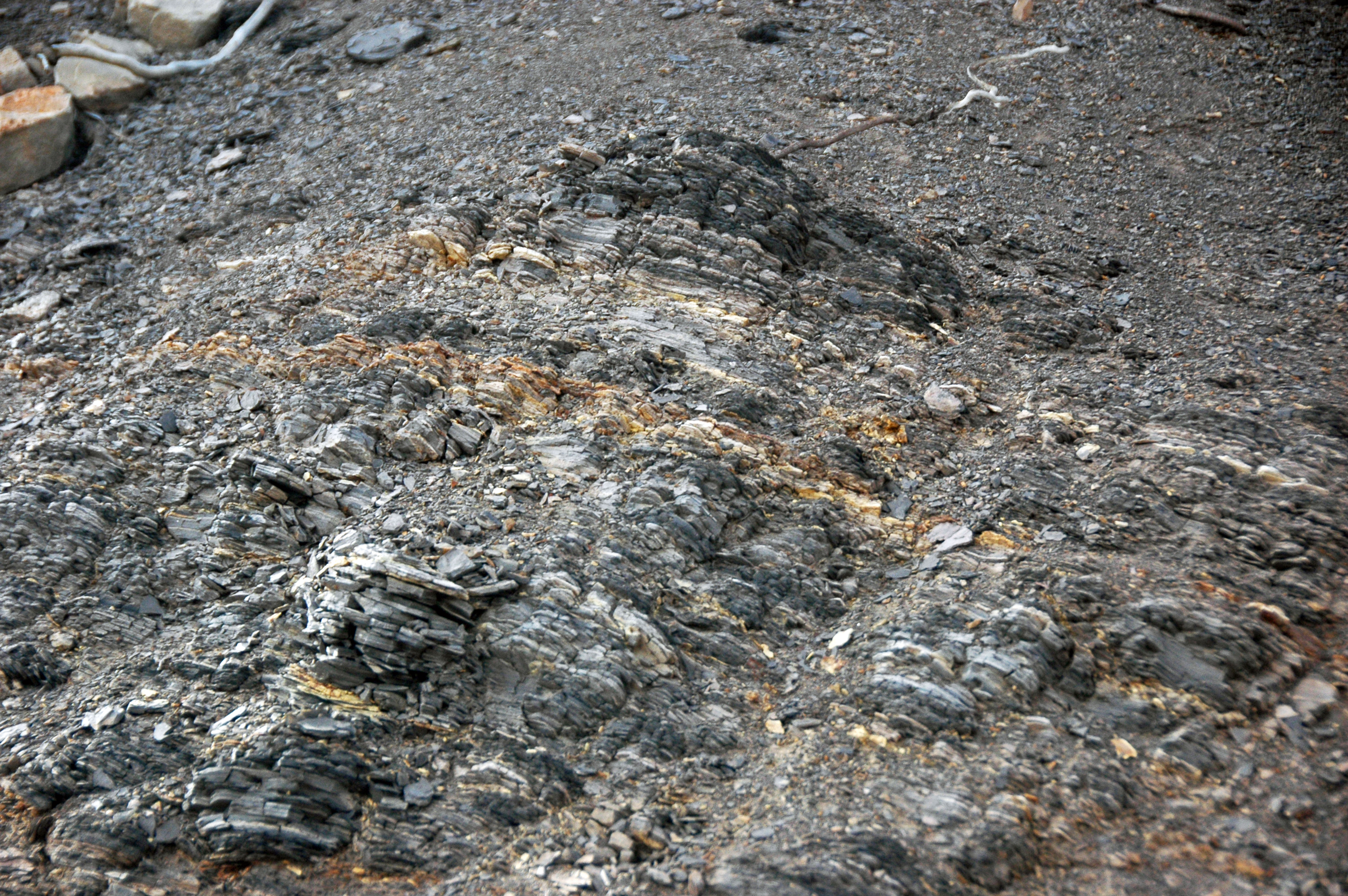
Gray shale and bentonites (Benton Shale; Colorado Springs, Colorado)

Bentonite (/ˈbɛntənaɪt/ BEN-tə-nyte) is an absorbent swelling clay consisting mostly of montmorillonite (a type of smectite) which can either be Na-montmorillonite or Ca-montmorillonite. Na-montmorillonite has a considerably greater swelling capacity than Ca-montmorillonite.

Bentonite usually forms from the weathering of volcanic ash in seawater, or by hydrothermal circulation through the porosity of volcanic ash beds, which converts (devitrification) the volcanic glass (obsidian, a volcanic glass with a chemical composition equivalent to rhyolite) present in the ash into clay minerals. In the mineral alteration process, a large fraction (up to 40–50 wt.%) of amorphous silica is dissolved and leached away, leaving the bentonite deposit in place. Bentonite beds are white or pale blue or green (traces of reduced Fe^{2+}) in fresh exposures, turning to a cream color and then yellow, red, or brown (traces of oxidized Fe^{3+}) as the exposure is weathered further.

As a swelling clay, bentonite has the ability to absorb large quantities of water, which increases its volume by up to a factor of eight. This makes bentonite beds unsuitable for building and road construction. However, the swelling property is used to advantage in drilling mud and groundwater sealants. The montmorillonite / smectite making up bentonite is an aluminium phyllosilicate mineral, which takes the form of microscopic platy grains. These give the clay a very large total surface area, making bentonite a valuable adsorbent. The plates also adhere to each other when wet, giving the clay a cohesiveness that makes it useful as a binder and as an additive to improve the plasticity of kaolinite clay used for pottery.

One of the first findings of bentonite was in the Cretaceous Benton Shale near Rock River, Wyoming. The Fort Benton Group, along with others in stratigraphic succession, was named after Fort Benton, Montana, in the mid-19th century by Fielding Bradford Meek and F. V. Hayden of the U.S. Geological Survey. Bentonite has since been found in many other locations, including China and Greece (bentonite deposit of the Milos volcanic island in the Aegean Sea). The total worldwide production of bentonite in 2018 was 20,400,000 metric tons.

== Types ==
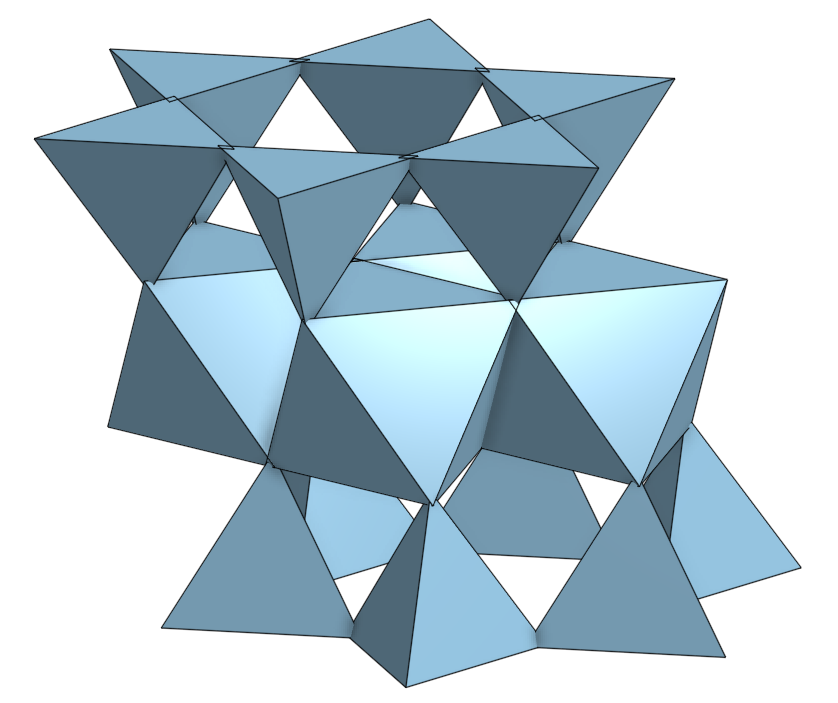
2:1 clay minerals crystallographic structure made of three superimposed sheets of Tetrahedra-Octahedra-Tetrahedra (TOT layer unit), respectively

Detailed molecular structure of pure montmorillonite, the best known end-member of the smectite group. The interlayer space between two successive TOT layers is filled with hydrated cations (mainly Na^{+} and Ca^{2+} ions) compensating the negative electrical charges of the TOT layers and with water molecules causing the interlayer expansion.

In geology, the term bentonite is applied to a type of claystone (a clay rock, not a clay mineral) composed mostly of montmorillonite (a clay mineral from the smectite group). It forms by devitrification of volcanic ash or tuff, typically in a marine environment. This results in a very soft, porous rock that may contain residual crystals of more resistant minerals, and which feels soapy or greasy to the touch. However, in commercial and industrial applications, the term bentonite is used more generally to refer to any swelling clay composed mostly of smectite clay minerals, which includes montmorillonite. The undifferentiated reference to the weathered volcanic rock for the geologist or to the industrial mixture of swelling clays can be a source of confusion.

The montmorillonite making up bentonite is an aluminium phyllosilicate mineral whose crystal structure is described as low-charge TOT. This means that a crystal of montmorillonite consists of layers, each of which is made up of two T sheets bonded to either side of an O sheet. The T sheets are so called because each aluminium or silicon ion in the sheet is surrounded by four oxygen ions arranged as a tetrahedron. The O sheets are so called because each aluminium ion is surrounded by six oxygen or hydroxyl ions arranged as an octahedron. The complete TOT layer has a weak negative electrical charge, and this is neutralized by calcium or sodium cations that bind adjacent layers together, with a distance between layers of about 1 nanometer. Because the negative charge is weak, only a fraction of the possible cation sites on the surface of a TOT layer actually contain calcium or sodium. Water molecules can easily infiltrate between sheets and fill the remaining sites. This accounts for the swelling property of montmorillonite and other smectite clay minerals.

The different types of bentonite are each named after the respective dominant cation. For industrial purposes, two main classes of bentonite are recognized: sodium and calcium bentonite. Sodium bentonite is the more valuable but calcium bentonite is more common. In stratigraphy and tephrochronology, completely devitrified (weathered volcanic glass) ash-fall beds are sometimes also referred to as "K-bentonites" (the illitized clay rock) when the dominant clay species is illite (a non-swelling clay). However, in pure clay mineralogy, the term illite is more appropriate than "K-bentonite" (the "altered K-rock") because it is a distinct type of non-swelling clay while the commercial term bentonite implicitly refers to a swelling clay, a smectite (in the European and UK terminology), or a montmorillonite (in the US terminology).

=== Sodium bentonite ===
Sodium bentonite expands when wet, absorbing as much as several times its dry mass in water. Because of its excellent colloidal properties, it is often used in drilling mud for oil and gas wells and boreholes for geotechnical and environmental investigations. The property of swelling also makes sodium bentonite useful as a sealant, since it provides a self-sealing, low permeability barrier. It is used to line the base of landfills, for example. Bentonite is also part of the backfill material used at the nuclear Waste Isolation Pilot Project. Various surface modifications to sodium bentonite improve some rheological or sealing performance in geoenvironmental applications, for example, the addition of polymers.

Sodium bentonite can be combined with elemental sulfur as fertilizer prills. These permit slow oxidation of the sulfur to sulfate, a plant nutrient needed for some crops like onions or garlic synthesizing a lot of organo-sulfur compounds, and maintain sulfate levels in rainfall-leached soil longer than either pure powdered sulfur or gypsum. Sulfur/bentonite pads with added organic fertilizers have been used for organic farming.

=== Calcium bentonite ===
Calcium bentonite is a useful adsorbent of ions in solution, as well as fats and oils. It is the main active ingredient of fuller's earth, probably one of the earliest industrial cleaning agents. It has significantly less swelling capacity than sodium bentonite.

Calcium bentonite may be converted to sodium bentonite (termed sodium beneficiation or sodium activation) to exhibit many of sodium bentonite's properties by an ion exchange process. As commonly practiced, this means adding 5–10% of a soluble sodium salt such as sodium carbonate to wet bentonite, mixing well, and allowing time for the ion exchange to take place and water to remove the exchanged calcium. Some properties, such as viscosity and fluid loss of suspensions, of sodium-beneficiated calcium bentonite (or sodium-activated bentonite) may not be fully equivalent to those of natural sodium bentonite. For example, residual calcium carbonates (formed if exchanged cations are insufficiently removed) may result in inferior performance of the bentonite in geosynthetic liners.

=== Illitisation of smectite clays by potassium ions and K-bentonite rock ===
Illite is the main clay constituent of potash bentonite (a rock type also known as K-bentonite or potassium bentonite). K-bentonite is a term reserved to volcanic stratigraphy and tephrochronology and is related to the weathered clay rock type only. Illite, the clay mineral, is a potassium-rich phyllosilicate formed from the alteration of smectic clay in contact with groundwater rich in K^{+} ions. Illite is a high-charge TOT clay mineral, in which negatively charged sheets are bound relatively strongly by more numerous potassium cations, and so it is no longer a swelling clay and has few industrial uses. In contrast to the highly hydrated Na^{+} ions which act as "swellers" or "expanders" ions, poorly hydrated K^{+} ions behave as "collapsers" when exchanging with Na^{+} ions accessible in the interlayers space present between two TOT layers. Dehydrated K^{+} ions are preferentially located in between two face-to-face hexagonal cavities formed by six joined silica tetrahedra present at the surface of the basal plane of a TOT layer (see the corresponding figure showing an elementary TOT layer). Because dehydrated, these K^{+} ions are sometimes said to form inner-sphere bonds with the surrounding oxygen atoms present in the hexagonal cavity hosting them. It means there is no water molecule in between the K^{+} ion and the oxygen atoms attached to the silica tetrahedra (T).

== Applications ==
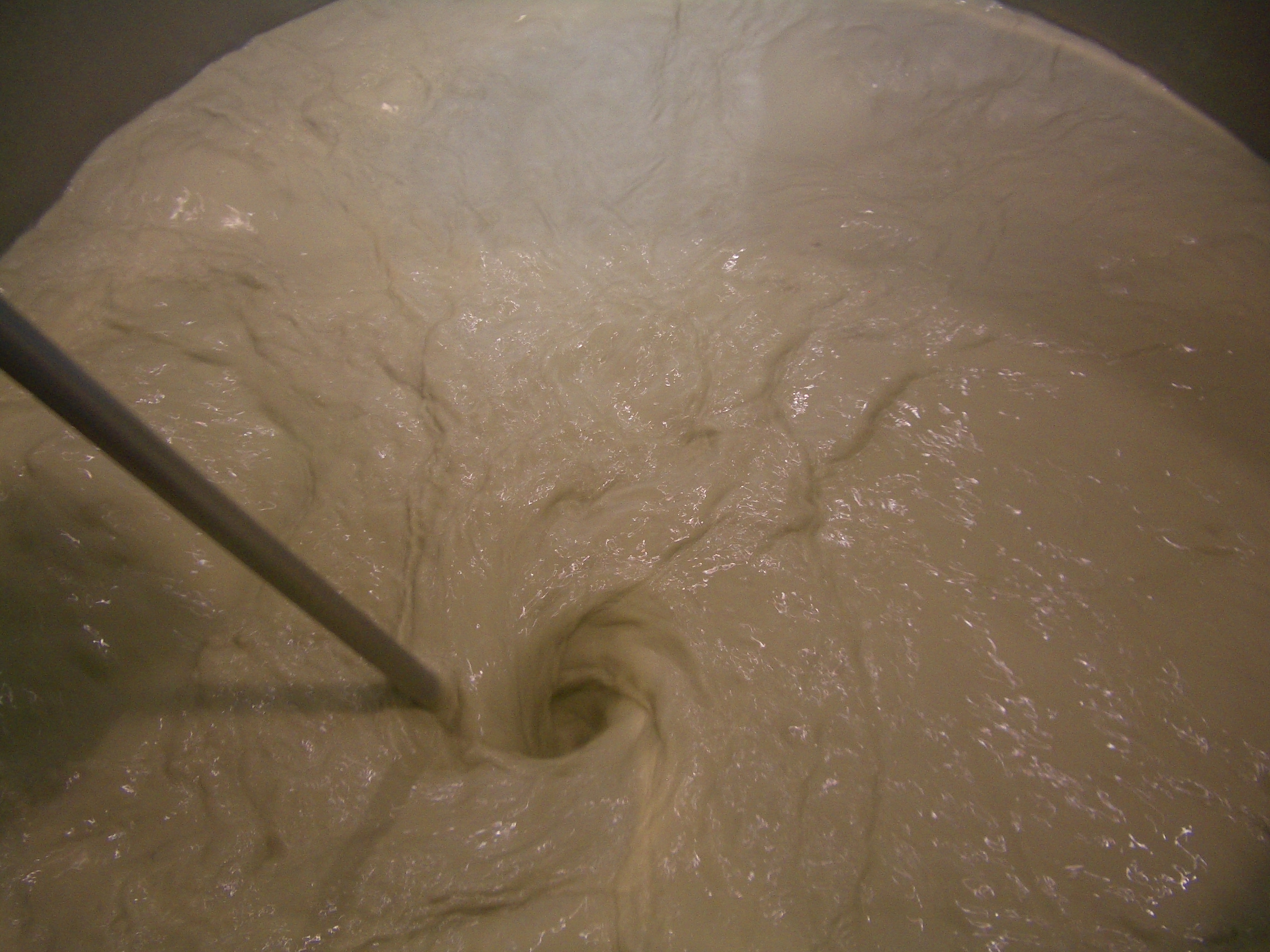
Making a bentonite slurry for fining after wine pressing

The main uses of bentonite are in drilling mud and as a binder, purifier, absorbent, and carrier for fertilizers or pesticides. As of around 1990, almost half of the US production of bentonite was used as drilling mud. Minor uses include filler, sealant, and catalyst in petroleum refining. Calcium bentonite is sometimes marketed as fuller's earth, whose uses overlap with those of other forms of bentonite.

=== Drilling mud ===
Bentonite is used in drilling mud to lubricate and cool the cutting tools (drill bit), to remove cuttings, to stabilize the borehole walls, and to help prevent blowouts (by maintaining a sufficient hydrostatic pressure in the well). Bentonite also curtails drilling fluid invasion by its propensity for aiding in the formation of mud cake. It plays an important role in the earth pressure balance and slurry shield variants of tunnel boring machines.

Much of bentonite's usefulness in the drilling and geotechnical engineering industry comes from its unique rheological properties. Relatively small quantities of bentonite suspended in water form a viscous, shear-thinning material. Most often, bentonite suspensions are also thixotropic, although rare cases of rheopectic behavior have also been reported. At high enough concentrations (about 60 grams of bentonite per litre of suspension, ~6wt.%), bentonite suspensions begin to take on the characteristics of a gel (a fluid with a minimum yield strength required to make it move).

=== Binder ===
Bentonite has been widely used as a foundry-sand bond in iron and steel foundries. Sodium bentonite is most commonly used for large castings that use dry molds, while calcium bentonite is more commonly used for smaller castings that use "green" or wet molds. Bentonite is also used as a binding agent in the manufacture of iron ore (taconite) pellets as used in the steelmaking industry. Bentonite, in small percentages, is used as an ingredient in commercial and homemade clay bodies and ceramic glazes. It greatly increases the plasticity of clay bodies and decreases settling in glazes, making both easier to work with for most applications.

The ionic surface of bentonite has a useful property in making a sticky coating on sand grains. When a small proportion of finely ground bentonite clay is added to hard sand and wetted, the clay binds the sand particles into a moldable aggregate known as green sand used for making molds in sand casting. Some river deltas naturally deposit just such a blend of clay silt and sand, creating a natural source of excellent molding sand that was critical to ancient metalworking technology. Modern chemical processes to modify the ionic surface of bentonite greatly intensify this stickiness, resulting in remarkably dough-like yet strong casting sand mixes that stand up to molten metal temperatures.

The same effluvial deposition of bentonite clay onto beaches accounts for the variety of plasticity of sand from place to place for building sand castles. Beach sand consisting of only silica and shell grains does not mold well compared to grains coated with bentonite clay. This is why some beaches are much better for building sandcastles than others.

The self-stickiness of bentonite allows high-pressure ramming or pressing of the clay in molds to produce hard, refractory shapes, such as model rocket nozzles.

=== Purification ===
Bentonites are used for decolorizing various mineral, vegetable, and animal oils. They are also used for clarifying wine, liquor, cider, beer, mead, and vinegar.

Bentonite has the property of adsorbing relatively large amounts of protein molecules from aqueous solutions. Consequently, bentonite is uniquely useful in the process of winemaking, where it is used to remove excessive amounts of protein from white wines. Were it not for this use of bentonite, many or most white wines would precipitate undesirable flocculent clouds or hazes upon exposure to warm temperatures, as these proteins denature. It also has the incidental use of inducing more rapid clarification of both red and white wines.

Bentonite is also considered an effective low-cost adsorbent for the removal of chromium(VI) ions from aqueous solutions (contaminated wastewater).

=== Absorbent ===
Bentonite is used in a variety of pet care items such as cat litter to absorb pet waste. It is also used to absorb oils and grease.

=== Carrier ===
Bentonite is used as an inert carrier for pesticides, fertilizers, and fire retardants. It helps ensure that the active agent is uniformly dispersed and that pesticides and fertilizers are retained on the plants.

=== Filler ===
Bentonite is used as a filler in a wide variety of products, including adhesives, cosmetics, paint, rubber, some greases, and soaps. It also acts as a stabilizer and extender in these products.

=== Sealant ===
The property of swelling on contact with water makes sodium bentonite useful as a sealant since it provides a self-sealing, low-permeability barrier. It is used to line the base of landfills to prevent migration of leachate, for confining metal pollutants of groundwater, and for the sealing of subsurface disposal systems for spent nuclear fuel. Similar uses include making slurry walls, waterproofing of below-grade walls, and forming other impermeable barriers, e.g., to seal off the annulus of a water well, to plug old wells.

Bentonite can also be "sandwiched" between synthetic materials to create geosynthetic clay liners (GCLs) for the aforementioned purposes. This technique allows for more convenient transport and installation, and it greatly reduces the volume of bentonite required. It is also used to form barriers around newly planted trees to constrain the growth of its roots: in order to prevent damage to any of the nearby footpaths, parking lots, playgrounds, etc; or any of the surrounding underground infrastructures like the pipes, drainage systems, sewers, etc. Farmers use bentonite to seal retention ponds and line canals.

=== Catalyst ===
High-purity calcium bentonite is treated with acid for use as a catalyst in cracking heavy petroleum fractions.

=== Medicine ===
Bentonite has been prescribed as a bulk laxative, and it is also used as a base for many dermatologic formulas. Granular bentonite is being studied for use in battlefield wound dressings. Bentonite is also sold online and in retail outlets for a variety of indications.

Bentoquatam is a bentonate-based topical medication intended to act as a shield against exposure to urushiol, the oil found in plants such as poison ivy or poison oak.

Bentonite can also be used as a desiccant due to its adsorption properties. Bentonite desiccants have been successfully used to protect pharmaceutical, nutraceutical, and diagnostic products from moisture degradation and extend shelf life. In most common package environments, bentonite desiccants offer a higher water adsorption capacity than silica gel desiccants. Bentonite complies with the FDA for contact with food and drugs.

=== Farming in Thailand ===
The application of clay technology by farmers in northeast Thailand, using bentonite clay, has dramatically reversed soil degradation and resulted in greater economic returns, with higher yields and higher output prices. Studies carried out by The International Water Management Institute and partners in 2002–2003 focused on the application of locally sourced bentonite clays to degraded soils in the region. These applications were carried out in structured field trials. Applying bentonite clays effectively improved yields of forage sorghum grown under rain-fed conditions.

Bentonite application also influenced the prices that farmers received for their crops. Production costs are higher, but due to higher production and the quality of the food, clay farmers could afford to invest and grow more and better food, compared to nonclay-using farmers.

=== Bentonite slurry walls in modern construction ===
Bentonite slurry walls (also known as diaphragm walls ) are used in construction, where the slurry wall is a trench filled with a thick colloidal mixture of bentonite and water. A trench that would collapse due to the hydraulic pressure in the surrounding soil does not collapse as the slurry balances the hydraulic pressure. Forms for concrete, and rebar, can be assembled in a slurry-filled trench, and then have concrete poured into the form. The liquid concrete being denser displaces the less-dense bentonite slurry and causes the latter to overflow from the trench. This displaced bentonite slurry is then channeled to a recycling unit from which it can subsequently be reused in a new trench elsewhere on the construction site.

In addition, because the colloid is relatively impervious to water, a slurry wall can prevent the seepage of groundwater, which is useful in preventing the further spread of groundwater that has been contaminated by toxic material such as industrial waste.

=== Ceramics ===
Plasticity is the property of clay that allows it to be manipulated and retain its shape without cracking after the shaping force has been removed; clays with low plasticity are known as short or non-plastic. A small amount of bentonite added to clay can increase its plasticity, and hence ease forming of articles by some shaping techniques. However, bentonite typically contains minerals that affect the fired color of the mix, and its swelling properties can make such a mix prone to significant shrinkage and potential cracking as it dries.

Ceramic glazes often contain bentonite. The bentonite is added to slow or prevent the settling of the glazes. It can also improve the consistency of application of glazes on porous biscuit-fired ware. Once a certain amount of glaze water has been absorbed by the biscuit the bentonite effectively clogs the pores and resists the absorption of further water resulting in a more evenly thick coat.

=== Emergency response ===
Bentonite is used in industry and emergency response as a chemical absorbent and container sealant.

== History and natural occurrence ==
In 2018, China was the top producer of bentonite, with almost a one-quarter share of the world's production, followed by the United States and India. Total worldwide production was 24,400,000 metric tons of bentonite and 3,400,000 metric tons of fuller's earth.

Most high-grade natural sodium bentonite is produced from the western United States in an area between the Black Hills of South Dakota and the Bighorn Basin of Wyoming, and the Tokat Resadiye region of Turkey. Mixed sodium/calcium bentonite is mined in Greece, Pakistan, Australia, India, Russia, and Ukraine.

In the United States, calcium bentonite is mined primarily in Mississippi and Alabama. Other major locations producing calcium bentonite include New Zealand, Germany, Greece, Turkey, India, and China.

== See also ==
- Medicinal clay – Use of clay in health care
