= Edna Fault =

Geological fault line

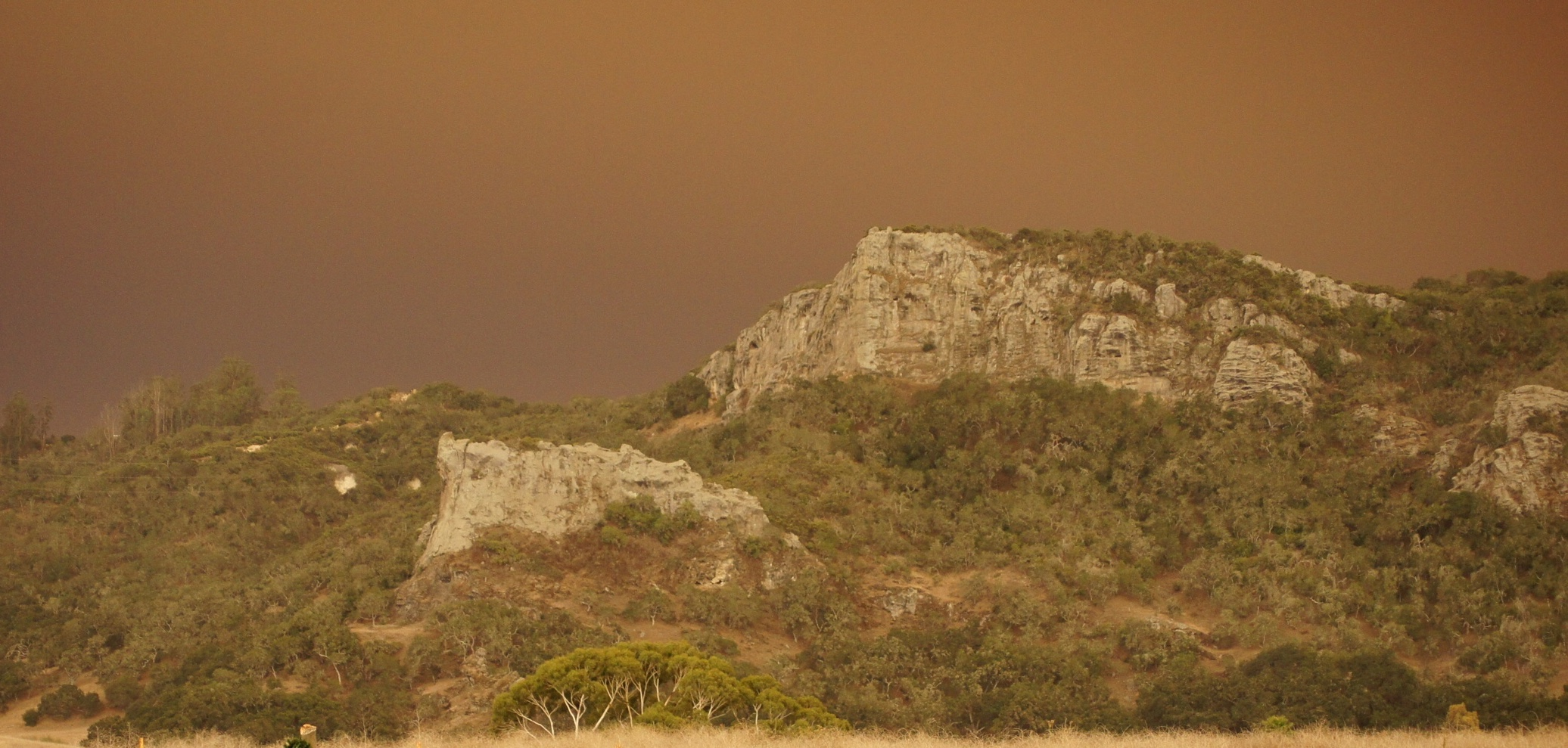
- Edna Fault during Thomas Fire

Highest point
- Elevation: 584 ft (178m)
- Coordinates: 35°11′02″N 120°36′38″W

Geography
- Location: San Luis Obispo County, California, U.S.
- Range coordinates: 35.132035°N 120.4735°W
- Parent range: San Luis Range
- Topo map: San Luis Obispo

Geology
- Mountain type: Strike-slip fault

Edna Fault is a 584-foot (178m) strike-slip fault in Edna Valley, California, known for its abrupt right angle shape when viewed from the north or south. Its cliff face faces east.

== Geology ==
Edna Fault is part of the San Luis (Mount Buchon) range in San Luis Obispo County, California. It contains both Miocene and Pliocene strata against a Franciscan basement and forms the northern border of the Pismo syncline. According to trenching and bedrock mapping studies, the fault was inactive during the late Quaternary period.

== Wildlife ==
Known flora and fauna of Edna Fault includes red-tailed hawk, ground squirrels, bobcats, and coast live oaks, among others.

== Land use ==
Though many local residents have expressed interest in hiking or climbing the fault, the property is under private ownership and such activities are uncommon.

A single road owned by PG&E leads up behind the fault nearly to the edge.
