= Underbalanced drilling =

Well drilling technique

Underbalanced drilling (UBD) is a procedure used to drill oil and gas wells where the pressure in the wellbore is kept lower than the static pressure of the formation being drilled. As the well is being drilled, formation fluid flows into the wellbore and up to the surface. This is the opposite of the usual situation, where the wellbore is kept at a pressure above the formation to prevent formation fluid entering the well. In such a conventional "overbalanced" well, the invasion of fluid is considered a kick, and if the well is not shut-in it can lead to a blowout, a dangerous situation. In underbalanced drilling, however, there is a "rotating head" at the surface - essentially a seal that diverts produced fluids to a separator while allowing the drill string to continue rotating.

If the formation pressure is relatively high, using a lower density mud will reduce the well bore pressure below the pore pressure of the formation. Sometimes an inert gas is injected into the drilling mud to reduce its equivalent density and hence its hydrostatic pressure throughout the well depth. This gas is commonly nitrogen, as it is non-combustible and readily available, but air, reduced oxygen air, processed flue gas and natural gas have all been used in this fashion.

Coiled tubing drilling (CTD) allows for continuous drilling and pumping and therefore underbalanced drilling can be utilized which can increase the rate of penetration (ROP).

== Fluid systems used in underbalanced drilling ==
There are several kinds of underbalanced drilling. The most common are listed below.

- Dry air. This is also known as dusting. Here air compressors combined with a booster (which takes the head from the compressors and increases the pressure of the air, but does not increase the volume of air going down hole) are used and the only fluid injected into the well is a small amount of oil to reduce corrosion.
- Mist. A small amount of foaming agent (soap) is added into the flow of air. Fine particles of water and foam in an atmosphere of air bring cuttings back to the surface.
- Foam. A larger amount of foaming agent is added into the flow. Bubbles and slugs of bubbles in an atmosphere of mist bring cuttings back to the surface.
- Stable foam. An even larger amount of foaming agent is added into the flow. This is the consistency of a shaving cream.
- Airlift. Slugs and bubbles of air in a matrix of water, soap can or can not be added into the fluid flow of air.
- Aerated mud. Air or another gas is injected into the flow of drilling mud. Degassing units are required to remove air before it can be recirculated.

== Advantages ==
Under-balanced wells have several advantages over conventional drilling including:

- Minimizes formation damage. In a conventional well, drilling mud is forced into the formation in a process called invasion, which frequently causes formation damage - a decrease in the ability of the formation to transmit oil into the well-bore at a given pressure and flow rate. It may or may not be repairable. In under-balanced drilling, if the under-balanced state is maintained until the well becomes productive, invasion does not occur and formation damage can be completely avoided.
- Increases rate of penetration (ROP). With less pressure at the bottom of the well-bore, it is easier for the drill bit to cut and remove rock.
- Reduction of lost circulation. Lost circulation is when drilling mud flows into the formation uncontrollably. Large amounts of mud can be lost before a proper mud cake forms, or the loss can continue indefinitely. If the well is drilled under-balanced, mud will not enter the formation and the problem can be avoided.
- Eliminates differential sticking. Differential sticking is when the drill pipe is pressed against the well-bore wall so that part of its circumference will see only reservoir pressure, while the rest will continue to be pushed by well-bore pressure. As a result, the pipe becomes stuck to the wall, and can require thousands of pounds of force to remove, which may prove impossible. Because the reservoir pressure is greater than the well-bore pressure in UBD, the pipe is pushed away from the walls, eliminating differential sticking.
- Reduces formation damage and water loss. Some rock formation has a reactive tendency to water. When drilling-mud is used the water in the drill mud reacts with the formation (mostly clay) and inherently causes formation damage (reduction in permeability and porosity). Use of under-balanced drilling can help prevent this.

== Disadvantages ==
Underbalanced drilling is usually more expensive than conventional drilling (when drilling a deviated well which requires directional drilling tools), and has safety issues of its own. Technically the well is always in a blowout condition unless a heavier fluid is displaced into the well. Air drilling requires a faster up hole volume as the cuttings will fall faster down the annulus when the compressors are taken off the hole compared to having a higher viscosity fluid in the hole. Because air is compressible mud pulse telemetry measurement while drilling (MWD) tools which require an incompressible fluid can not work. Common technologies used to eliminate this problem are either electromagnetic MWD tools or wireline MWD tools. Downhole mechanics are usually more violent also because the volume of fluid going through a downhole motor or downhole hammer is greater than an equivalent fluid when drilling balanced or over balanced because of the need of higher up hole velocities. Corrosion is also a problem, but can be largely avoided using a coating oil or rust inhibitors.

Nas, Steve, Chapter 12 Underbalanced Drilling, from Petroleum Engineering Handbook, Volume II, Editor Robert Mitchell, 2007, pages II-519 to 569. Handbook available from Society of Petroleum Engineers (SPE).
