= Buchan Oil Field =

Oil field in the central North Sea

Buchan oil field
- Location within North Sea
- Country: Scotland
- Region: Central North Sea, South Halibut Basin
- Offshore/onshore: Offshore
- Coordinates: 57°48′N 0°0′E
- Operator: Talisman Energy

Field history
- Discovery: August 1974
- Start of production: May 1981
- Peak of production: 1983
- Abandonment: 2018

The Buchan oil field is a small oil field with small gas reserves in the central North Sea. It lies in an area known as the South Halibut Basin, approximately 120 miles (190 km) northeast of Aberdeen, Scotland, and is located mainly in license block 21/1A, extending into block 20/5A(E). The field was discovered in August 1974, two years after the issue date for those blocks. It is named after Buchan, an area of N.E. Scotland with its main town being Peterhead.

Buchan was initially considered a very risky field, both commercially and operationally, and was expected to be finished with after five years. The field's geology created significant difficulties at the start of its development, but the development of new drilling and extraction technology has made possible a continuing increase in its recoverable reserves. It is thought that Buchan will continue to play an important part in the North Sea and that further technological breakthroughs will allow continued production of this field to at least 2018.

== Exploration ==
As the initial licence block holder, Transworld Petroleum (UK) with Texaco drilled the first well in the field in Aug 1974. In the next two years a further three appraisal wells were drilled in the area. However, this proved to be very difficult area to extract from: tests revealed an extremely complex and fractured field, and two of the appraisal drills were eventually lost. BP was then farmed in to become the operator of the field in 1977.

Buchan was initial described as a “small field of uncertain reserve potential” (Hill 1979). Early estimates were for reserves of approximately 50 million barrels (7,900,000 m^{3}) of oil. Some estimates though suggested upwards of 120 million barrels (19,000,000 m^{3}) of oil might be extractable depending on further capital expenditure and the ability of the reservoir. Production of the field began in May 1981 and reached peak production capacity in May 1983, when the field was producing 32,000 barrels per day (5,100 m^{3}/d).

Further fields have been discovered in the Buchan field area. The Buchan North Satellite field was discovered shortly after the main field. The nearby Hannay Field, discovered in 1996, is tied back to the Buchan Alpha rig.

== Geology ==
The central horst of the field is approximately 400 meters thick on an east-to-west orientation. This central horst is made up of Old Red Sandstone from the Devonian and Lower Carboniferous periods (Edwards 1991). The horst is surrounded by Middle to Late Jurassic sands which are fluvial and aeolian interbedded with siltstones (Hill 1979). The quality of these sands though varies both vertically and laterally (fig 2). The central horst is thought to contain 370 million barrels (59,000,000 m^{3}) oil while the surrounding Jurassic sands are expected to contain significantly less, approximately 38 million barrels (6,000,000 m^{3}) oil (Wood Mackenzie 2002).

The most important factor of this field is the overpressure of the central horst. This overpressure has been created by what is thought to be an uplift of 2500 m, of which 1000 m occurred during the Lower Cretaceous Period (Hill 1979). The pressure data that was collected from the appraisal wells show that there is an overpressure of 3,200 lbf/in² (22 MPa). More importantly the transition zone from normal pressure to this overpressure happens over some extremely thin Lower Cretaceous layers, which in parts are only 30 m thick.

These initial findings suggested that this would be a marginal field which would be difficult to extract from. This data also suggested that extraction would be limited due to a low porosity and permeability. However, as with all fields, as more was investigated from production data, new facts about the geology were revealed. In this case, the Buchan field is fairly fractured due to its location on an old fault line. Therefore, there are numerous fissures in the reservoir which increase its porosity and permeability.

Three other major problems of the field’s geology would have to be overcome during the drilling stage (Hill 1979). Initially there were problems with the geophysical data of the field. As mentioned, the field is highly fractured due to its location. This lowered the quality of the seismic data, giving poor reflections. As a result, geophysics could not be used to accurately define the top depth of the reservoir; initial depth estimates were out by as much as 133 m.

The pore pressures of the layers over the reservoir are also very dangerous, as they vary greatly from one to the next. There is normal pressure in the Upper Cretaceous limestone layers, but between this normal pressure in the limestone and the over-pressured reservoir there is only a small layer of Lower Cretaceous shale. In parts this shale is only 30 m thick separating the above layer and the over-pressured reservoir. As a result pore pressure in the shale at the top is close to normal but rapidly approaches 3200 psi (22 MPa) as it comes in contact with the reservoir. This circumstance was to prove difficult when selecting the appropriate mud weights during drilling. Furthermore the Shale layer did not have even layer depth throughout varying from 30 to 200 m so making it difficult to extrapolate pore pressure in different sections (Hill 1979).

During the drilling of appraisal wells in the reservoir two major loss zones were discovered. Fractured zones such as those encountered around the Buchan field can lead to a complete or serious loss of the entire mud stream as it is absorbed by the formation. Both cases involved the penetration of the reservoir at a much shallower depth than originally considered due to vague geotechnical data. The first case, in well 21/1-2, resulted in considerable mud losses and a significant section of the hole had to be abandoned so the drilling could take a different path. This option was not available in the second case, in well 21/1-4, and the hole had to be abandoned eventually.

Furthermore, the geological makeup of the matrix of the reservoir did not contribute to the production of the field to the extent that was hoped. It was initially assumed that full production would peak at 72,000 bbl/d (11,400 m^{3}/d) and have an average production rate of 48,000 bbl/d (7,600 m^{3}/d). However, the field only reached a peak of 32,000 bbl/d (5,100 m^{3}/d) and the field average was significantly lower than that.

== Drilling ==
BP had to employ sophisticated measures to overcome the field's geological difficulties. These problems were significant enough that the project's two senior engineers published a paper about them in the Society of Petroleum Engineers. They faced problems with the project timing, with the operational drilling of the well, and with the completion phase (Pinchbeck 1979).

The lack of suitable geophysical data on the reservoir required serious precautions. The well was designed to have numerous backups to ensure that if the reservoir top was penetrated accidentally that the casing strings would be able to handle the overpressure. There was also the problem of the encountering other loss zones such as those experienced by the appraisal wells, which was overcome through a combination of strict control of the drilling and its location, along with careful analysis of the various geological variables. This ensured that the correct-sized wells were drilled through the loss zones and that the over-pressured shales were avoided by careful monitoring of the pore pressure. In total nine wells were drilled for production (seven central wells and two satellite wells).

== Development ==
The initial lifetime of this field was five years with a production of 50 million barrels (7,900,000 m^{3}) oil, so to maximize profit the development had to proceed very quickly and all capital costs be kept to a minimum (Mieras 1983). For this reason a lot of the development was done in parallel so that the wells, pipelines, and offshore loading buoy were all completed in time. Since the drilling had been fully completed and then capped the previous autumn, when the rig was available to come on-line it was almost able to reach full reservoir production capacity immediately. The biggest delay came from the conversion of a semi-submersible drilling rig, Drillmaster, to a production rig, which ended up 20 months late and 40% costlier than first envisioned (Mieras 1983). These retrospective upgrades were necessary after a similar rig, Alexander L. Keilland, collapsed and killed 100 people.

The topsides for Buchan Alpha were designed by Matthew Hall Engineering which was also responsible for procurement, project management, construction management and offshore installation services. They were awarded the contract in October 1977. Initially there were facilities for eight oil production wells. The production capacity was 70,000 barrels of oil per day and 600,000 standard cubic metres of gas per day. There was a single production train of three stages of separation with the first stage operating at a pressure of 10 barg. Electricity generation was powered by four 2 MW diesel engines. The topside accommodation was for 80 people.

Production of the Buchan Oil field came on-line in May 1981, and oil export initiated in June 1981. Initially oil was offloaded from the platform to a tanker. However in 1986 a pipeline was built which connects with the Forties pipeline system and then to Cruden Bay. This pipeline added a further 15 million barrels (2,400,000 m^{3}) to the recoverable reserves.

Production peaked soon in 1983 with an average of 32,000 bbl/d (5,100 m^{3}/d), but in late 1984 production was declining, and the rig underwent a major maintenance programme along with an addition of gas lift facilities. Unlike most fitting of gas lifts causing long delays in production, the need for a gas lift had been anticipated and so was able to be completed via wireline intervention (Pinchbeck 1979). The addition of the gas lift allowed production to reach 20,000 bbl/d (3,200 m^{3}/d) for several years before beginning a slow steady decline in 1989. Any remaining gas is flared.

Reserves for the field, though, were continually upgraded from the cautious prediction of 50 million barrels of oil in 1979 to 134 mbo in 2002. This was put down to increased knowledge of the field as well as improvement in extraction methods.

BP continued to be the principal operator of the field alongside Texaco, which had been awarded the 20/5(a) block. This continued until August 1996 when the field was sold along with the Beatrice Oil Field and Clyde oil field fields to Talisman Energy, a Canadian oil company that specialises in fields that are nearing their abandonment stage. As of 2002 the field was thought to still have a further 37 million barrels (5,900,000 m^{3}) of recoverable oil. Due to advancements in technology and better understanding of the field, the final size of the recoverable reserves is thought to be 155 million barrels (24,600,000 m^{3}) oil.

== Future ==
Talisman specialises in extracting significant amount of reserves from mature fields by using advanced drilling techniques to improve the production and tap additional reserves in the field.

One such method being tested as of 2001 is for an underbalanced drilling and coiled tubing drilling programme, which at the time had not been tried before from an FSPO (CCNMathews 2001). This would sidetrack an existing hole and increase production. This did indeed increase production by 5,500 bbl/d (870 m^{3}/d), raising the daily average to 13,000 bbl/d (2,100 m^{3}/d). Since the success of this type of drilling, a further two wells will undergo this treatment.

The Buchan field plays an integral part in Talisman's long-term strategy as they hope to continue to produce from this field long past the expected closing date of 2015. This continued success with new technology has inspired hope that Talisman can extract a much larger part of the total 400 million barrels (64,000,000 m^{3}) in place.

Latest update from the HSE is that the Buchan field will cease production in September 2017, despite extensive surveying of the mechanical structure of the Buchan Alpha drilling platform discovering no signs of metal fatigue or weakness within the installation. It could, technically, go on for years but it is extremely unlikely that this will be allowed.

== See also ==
- Energy policy of the United Kingdom
- Energy use and conservation in the United Kingdom
