= William Buchan =

William Buchan may refer to:

- William Buchan (physician) (1729–1805), Scottish physician
- William Buchan, 3rd Baron Tweedsmuir (1916–2008), English peer and author
- Bill Buchan Sr., Scottish-born American sailor and boat-builder
- William Earl Buchan (born 1935), American sailor and Olympic champion
- William Carl Buchan (born 1956), his son, American sailor and Olympic champion
- Willie Buchan (1914–2003), Scottish footballer
