= Perdita Buchan =

American novelist

The Hon. Perdita Buchan
- Born: Perdita Caroline Buchan; December 16, 1940 (age 85)
- Education: Radcliffe College
- Occupations: Author; journalist; educator
- Children: 1
- Writing career
- Pen name: Perdita Buchan Connolly (married name)
- Period: 1960s–present
- Genres: Short Story, Non-fiction (History/Travel)
- Subjects: Utopian communities (New Jersey), College life
- Notable awards: Bunting Institute Fellow in creative writing (1972–1974)

The Hon. Perdita Caroline Buchan (born 16 December 1940) is an Anglo-American author and journalist.

As a writer she uses her maiden name, but is also known by her married name of Perdita Buchan Connolly.

== Background ==
Buchan was born in 1940, the eldest child of the Anglo-Scottish author William Buchan (1916–2008), who more than fifty years later became Baron Tweedsmuir, by his first marriage in 1939 to Nesta Irene Crozier (1918–2009), the daughter of Charles Darley Crozier, a barrister. Her parents were divorced in 1946. On her father's side she has four half-sisters and three half-brothers, including John Buchan, 4th Baron Tweedsmuir, the novelist James Buchan, and Ursula Buchan, gardening columnist of The Daily Telegraph. On her mother's side she has a further half-sister, Valerie Gardner, and had a half-brother, Rawdon Perry, now deceased. Her other grandfather was the politician and novelist John Buchan, who had been Governor General of Canada.

A half-plate photograph of Buchan at the age of one month, with her mother, is in the National Portrait Gallery, London. After her divorce, Buchan's mother married secondly Richard Parry (1916–1989), a Harvard-educated naval officer then working in London for the U.S. Maritime Commission, and later moved with her daughter to the United States. They settled at Chestnut Hill, Philadelphia, where Nesta Parry had two further children, and at the time of her death was still living there.

== Life ==
Arriving in the US as a child, Buchan lived at Chestnut Hill, Philadelphia. For her college education she went to Radcliffe, where her subject was English and as a freshman she took archery for her compulsory sport. She graduated in 1962, and her first book, Girl with a Zebra, was published in 1966. A well-reviewed campus novel, its main characters are Emily and Blaise, students at Radcliffe and Harvard, who fall in love while Emily is looking after the biology department's zebra. A violent episode results in Emily and the zebra disappearing. After that, Buchan wrote short stories for The New Yorker. From 1972 to 1974 she was a Bunting Institute Fellow in creative writing, and she went on to teach in the writing program at Rutgers University.

In November 1968 Buchan married Edward Connolly, and they had a daughter. She and Connolly were divorced in 1977.

In 2003 she was living in Ocean Grove, New Jersey. She has also lived in Concord, Massachusetts, and is a Trustee of the Whitesbog Preservation Trust.

Her Utopia, New Jersey: Travels in the Nearest Eden (2007) is a study of eight utopian communities in the state of New Jersey in the 19th century and the first half of the 20th.

== Selected publications ==
- Girl with a Zebra (Scribner's, 1966)
- Called Away (Little, Brown, 1980)
- "'Cliffe Notes: a nostalgic look at a bygone world" in Harvard Magazine dated May/June 2002
- Utopia, New Jersey: Travels in the Nearest Eden (Rutgers University Press, 2007)
