= Alexander Buchanan =

Alexander Buchanan, Alex Buchanan or Alexander Buchan may refer to:

== Alexander Buchanan ==
- Alexander Buchanan, merchant and namesake for Troy Buchanan High School
- Alexander Buchanan, prisoner on the St. Michael of Scarborough
- Alex Buchanan (politician) (1905–1985), Australian politician
- Alexander Buchanan Campbell (1914–2007), Scottish architect
- Alexander Buchanan (soldier) (d. 1424), eldest of the three sons of Sir Walter Buchanan, eleventh Laird of Buchanan
- Alan Alexander Buchanan (1905–1984), Anglican bishop
- Eric Alexander Buchanan (1848–1928), the 3rd Baronet Buchanan of Dunburgh
- John Alexander Buchanan (1887–1976), Canadian politician and civil engineer
- Alexander Buchanan (judge) (1848–1930), of Supreme Court of South Australia
- John Alexander Buchanan (1887–1976), Canadian politician and civil engineer
- Bender (rapper) (1980–2018), Canadian underground hip hop artist
- Alexander McKenzie Buchanan (1805–1868), Justice of the Louisiana Supreme Court
- Alexander Buchanan (stockman) (1810–1865), early pioneer in South Australia

== Alex Buchanan ==
- Mayor Alex Buchanan, fictional character; see One Life to Live storylines (1990–1999)
- Alexandria "Alex" Isaacson Buchanan, fictional character
- Alex Buchanan, better known as Kingkade, progressive house DJ and music producer

== Alexander Buchan ==
- Alexander Buchan (artist) (d. 1769), Scottish landscape artist
- Alexander Buchan (mathematician) (1904–1976), Scottish mathematician
- Alexander Buchan (meteorologist) (1829–1907), Scottish meteorologist
