= William Buchan, 3rd Baron Tweedsmuir =

British writer

The Right Honourable The Lord Tweedsmuir

Baron Tweedsmuir
- In office 20 June 1996 – 29 June 2008
- Preceded by: John Norman Stuart Buchan
- Succeeded by: John William de l'Aigle Buchan

Personal details
- Born: 10 January 1916
- Died: 29 June 2008 (aged 92)
- Spouse(s): Nesta Crozier (m. 1939; div. 1946) Barbara Ensor (m. 1946; div. 1960) Sauré Tatchell (m. 1960)
- Parent(s): John Buchan, 1st Baron Tweedsmuir; Susan Charlotte Grosvenor
- Education: Dragon School; Eton College
- Alma mater: New College, Oxford

William James de L'Aigle Buchan, 3rd Baron Tweedsmuir (10 January 1916 – 29 June 2008), also known as William Tweedsmuir, was an English peer and author of novels, short stories, memoirs and verse. He was the second son of the writer and Governor General of Canada, John Buchan.

== Early life and career ==
Brought up at Elsfield Manor, outside Oxford, he frequently wrote poetry as a boy and appeared as "Bill" in his aunt Anna Masterton Buchan's popular novels, written under the pen name "O. Douglas". His mother, Susan Charlotte Grosvenor, was a close relative of the Duke of Westminster. Visitors to the family home included a 15-year-old Jessica Mitford in the summer of 1932, T. E. Lawrence, a week before his death in 1935, and, that same year, Virginia Woolf, who called him "a simple".

Buchan attended Dumpton School in Dorset and the Dragon School in Oxford, then Eton College, and won the Harvey English verse prize there. At New College, Oxford, he "enjoyed a riotous year", according to an obituary in The Daily Telegraph, before dropping out. A different picture of his personality was given by an obituary in the Liverpool Daily Post, which described him during his schoolboy period as "a shy and solitary figure, and this mood continued into New College, Oxford". Visiting the set of Alfred Hitchcock's film version of The Thirty-Nine Steps, a novel written by his father, the young man became interested in the movie industry, and Buchan senior got him a job working with Hitchcock at Gaumont-British Motion Picture Corporation. His salary as third assistant director was a token five shillings a week, so he lived off an allowance from his parents and lodged in London with the writer Elizabeth Bowen. It was becoming clear to him that he was being edged out of his job at Gaumont-British when a throat ailment resulted in an operation, causing him to leave sooner. To recuperate, he went to Ottawa, Ontario, Canada, where his father was serving as governor general. On the order of the Canadian prime minister, Mackenzie King, the young Buchan was barred, along with his brother Alastair, from a nightclub outside Ottawa. King disapproved of Buchan's parents, in particular regarding his father as a "libertine".

He then moved to New York in 1937, where his father provided him with literary connections. At one point he asked the critic Alexander Woollcott for a job but was told, "When I was a boy you were supposed to go to the bottom of the nearest tree and climb steadily until you got to the top."

At the suggestion of French film director and actor Michel Saint-Denis, Buchan visited Peggy Ashcroft, who had acted in The 39 Steps, and the pair began a two-year affair. Buchan then returned to England at the age of 21, but soon spent three months in Florence, Italy, and on his return met Kenneth de Courcy, publisher of Intelligence Digest and carried dispatches from de Courcy to France. On one occasion Buchan visited Otto von Habsburg, claimant to the throne of Austria, who questioned him closely about British politics.

In 1939 Buchan married Nesta Crozier, and in December 1940 the couple had a daughter, Perdita Buchan. He also co-founded The Pilot Press, which published his short (at 10,000 words) but admiring book on Winston Churchill (a stance at odds with that of his father), and later his brief history of the Royal Air Force. He learned of the death of his father in 1940 from a news hoarding.

== War service ==
He enlisted in the Royal Air Force in February 1940 and joined No. 32 Squadron, flying Hawker Hurricanes on patrols in the Western Approaches. He was transferred to Egypt, then to No. 261 Squadron in Iraq. He flew over Palestine and served in the defence of Cyprus. He initially served in the ranks, and was a leading aircraftman prior to being commissioned as a pilot officer on probation on 20 January 1941 (with seniority from 14 January), the commission was confirmed, and he was promoted to war substantive flying officer, precisely a year later. After the Japanese invasion of Singapore, 261 Squadron was sent to reinforce the air force on Java. By the time it arrived at Ceylon (now Sri Lanka), on the carrier Indomitable, the pilots were ordered to fly to RAF Station China Bay on that island. On Easter Day, 5 April 1942, the squadron saw intense action against Japanese bombers from five aircraft carriers mounting a major attack against Colombo. When the Japanese force withdrew four days later, the carrier Hermes and two cruisers had been sunk, and only six of 261 Squadron's original 18 aircraft were serviceable. He was promoted to flight lieutenant on 20 January 1943.

Buchan twice had to bale out of his aircraft and came close to death on other occasions. At one point a cannon shell struck behind his cockpit seat; on another, a shell hit his ammunition reserve but didn't go off. After serving with air defence for Ceylon and Madras, he was transferred to air headquarters in Calcutta for six months, then returned to join No. 17 Squadron in Ceylon. He was back in England in April 1945 to serve at RAF Training Command, where he compiled a history, The Royal Air Force at War, an account of the daily lives of servicemen, and was promoted to squadron leader before ending his service. This was published by his Pilot Press, as mentioned above.

== Later life and career ==
His marriage broke up during the war, and in 1946 he divorced his first wife and married Barbara Ensor, with whom he had three sons and three further daughters, including the writer James Buchan and Ursula Buchan, gardening columnist for The Daily Telegraph. That marriage ended in divorce in 1960.

After the war, Buchan worked in Glasgow for the explosives division of Nobel Industries, then became London editor of Reader's Digest. He spent three years with the magazine and claimed that he came up with the story "How My Dog Taught Me to Pray". Buchan founded a public relations company, which went out of business by the late 1960s, then did work for Norwest Holst, a large construction company, and later for Elf Aquitaine, the French national oil company.

Simultaneously, Buchan pursued his literary career. A short story collection, The Exclusives, was published in 1943. He next published Personal Poems in 1952 and Kumari in 1955, a novel set in Calcutta. Two thrillers, Helen All Alone (1961) and The Blue Pavilion (1969), followed. He also edited the correspondence of John Masefield and the violinist Audrey Napier-Smith, Letters to Reyna, which appeared in 1982. He was best known for his John Buchan: a Memoir, also published in 1982, and his autobiography, Rags of Time, which appeared in 1990.

On the death of his brother, Johnnie, in 1996, William Buchan succeeded to the title, taking his seat in the House of Lords. There he spoke once, on the case for an elected mayor of London.

In 1960, the year his second marriage was dissolved, Buchan married a third time, to Sauré Tatchell, with whom he had a son Alexander Edward Buchan. According to Buchan's obituary in The Daily Telegraph, in addition to the eight children of his three marriages "there was also another daughter." Buchan's eldest son, Toby (born in 1950), succeeded to the peerage.

== Reception of his writings ==
The memoir of his father (1982) was regarded as his best book, but his autobiography, The Rage of Time (1990), had its admirers, according to an obituary in the Liverpool Daily Post.

His book of poems, published in 1952, was praised in the Times Literary Supplement, which described his voice as "winning and sincere". The reviewer wrote, "In writing to please himself, he will please others too, for his unselfconscious sympathies are easy to share, his young man's experience corresponds with that of half his generation, his turn for verbal music is quietly refreshing, and everywhere competent."

Kumari, published in 1955, has been described as "a lush, complex novel about the experiences and romances of a young man in 1930s India". One reviewer wrote that the book tells the reader as much about India and British rule there "as a hundred official publications, or, it might be added, a dozen travel books".

Buchan wrote his first thriller, Helen All Alone, deliberately in the vein of his father's novels, but with a woman as the main character, a point which provoked criticism in The Times. The reviewer declared, "Women in a thriller should be decorative, not pivotal." The TLS, in contrast, praised the book's description of atmosphere and scenery.

== Works ==
Each year links to corresponding "[year] in literature" or "[year] in poetry" article:

- 1940: Winston Churchill, a short, admiring biography of Winston Churchill
- 1943: The Exclusives, a short-story collection
- 1946: The Royal Air Force at War, an account of the daily lives of servicemen
- 1952: Personal Poems, evoking life in Wartime India
- 1955: Kumari, a novel set in Calcutta
- 1961: Helen All Alone, thriller set in 1950 in the Balkans, thought to be the first involving a woman British spy as the main character
- 1966: The Blue Pavilion, thriller based on the early-1950s French sex scandal known as the Ballets Roses. A young businessman visiting Paris with his beautiful girlfriend becomes caught up in depravity and blackmail.
- 1982: Editor, Letters to Reyna, correspondence of poet John Masefield and Audrey Napier-Smith, a violinist with the Hallé Orchestra
- 1982: John Buchan: a Memoir, about his relationship with his father
- 1990: The Rags of Time: A Fragment of Autobiography, autobiography

Buchan also wrote introductions for literary works – including Don Quixote and the 1994 Oxford Classics edition of his father's thriller Mr Standfast.

== Arms ==
Coat of arms of William Buchan, 3rd Baron Tweedsmuir
Crest A sunflower proper. Escutcheon Azure, a fesse between three lions' heads erased argent. Supporters Dexter: a stag proper attired or collared gules; Sinister: a falcon proper jessed belled and beaked or armed and collared gules. Motto Non inferiora secutus (Not following meaner things).

Peerage of the United Kingdom
Preceded by John Norman Stuart Buchan	Baron Tweedsmuir; 1996–2008	Succeeded by John William de l'Aigle Buchan
