= Elsfield =

Village in Oxfordshire, England

Coordinates: 51.788°N 1.219°W

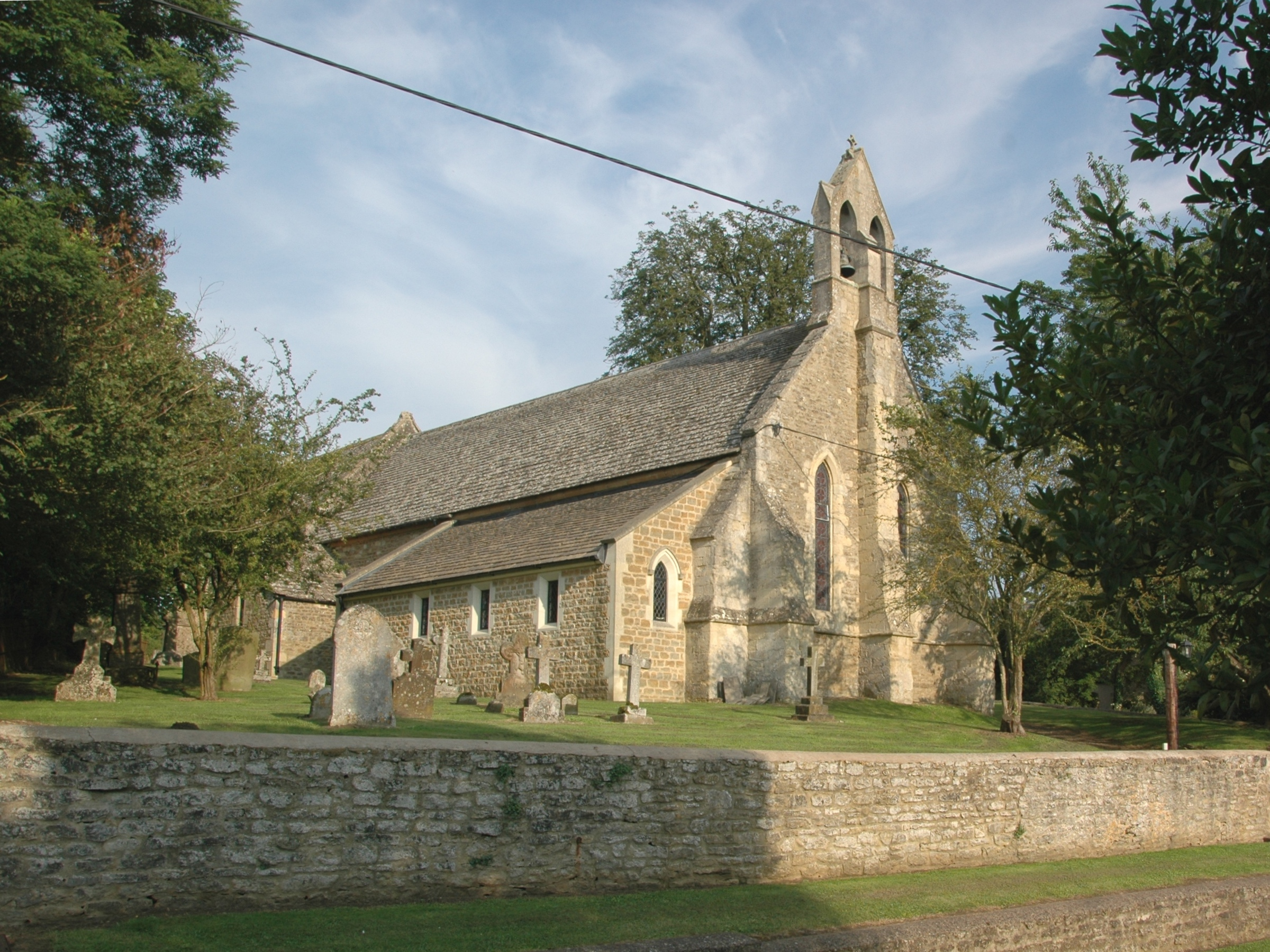
- St. Thomas of Canterbury parish church

- Location within Oxfordshire
- Area: 1.53 km^{2} (0.59 sq mi)
- Population: 191 (2011 census, includes Woodeaton)
  - Density: 125/km^{2} (320/sq mi)
- OS grid reference: SP539101
- Civil parish: Elsfield
- District: South Oxfordshire
- Shire county: Oxfordshire
- Region: South East
- Country: England
- Sovereign state: United Kingdom
- Post town: Oxford
- Postcode district: OX3
- Dialling code: 01865
- Police: Thames Valley
- Fire: Oxfordshire
- Ambulance: South Central
- UK Parliament: Henley and Thame

Elsfield is an English village and civil parish about 3 miles (5 km) northeast of the centre of Oxford. The village is 310 feet (94 m) above sea level on the western brow of a hill with relatively steep sides above the River Cherwell. For relative reference purposes, the Oxford alluvial flood plain is at 60 metres above sea level.

== Parish church ==
The chancel arch of the Church of England parish church dates from at least the latter part of the 12th century. The church formerly had a north aisle that may also have dated from this period. There is a canonical sundial on the south wall. In about 1273 the church was remodelled and rededicated to St Thomas of Canterbury. The Decorated Gothic east window was added in about the 14th century. Either side of the south doorway are two Perpendicular Gothic windows that were added in about the 15th century. The pulpit is Jacobean.

In 1849 the church was heavily restored in an Early English Gothic style. Until then, the blocked arcade of the north aisle was visible in the north wall of the nave. During the restoration the arcade seems to have been removed; there are 12th-century capitals in the Vicarage garden that may have come from it. The floor and seating were renewed in 1859 under the direction of the Gothic Revival architect G.E. Street. In about 1860 a mosaic reredos by Salviati was added in the chancel. St. Thomas's is a Grade II* listed building.

== Notable inhabitants ==
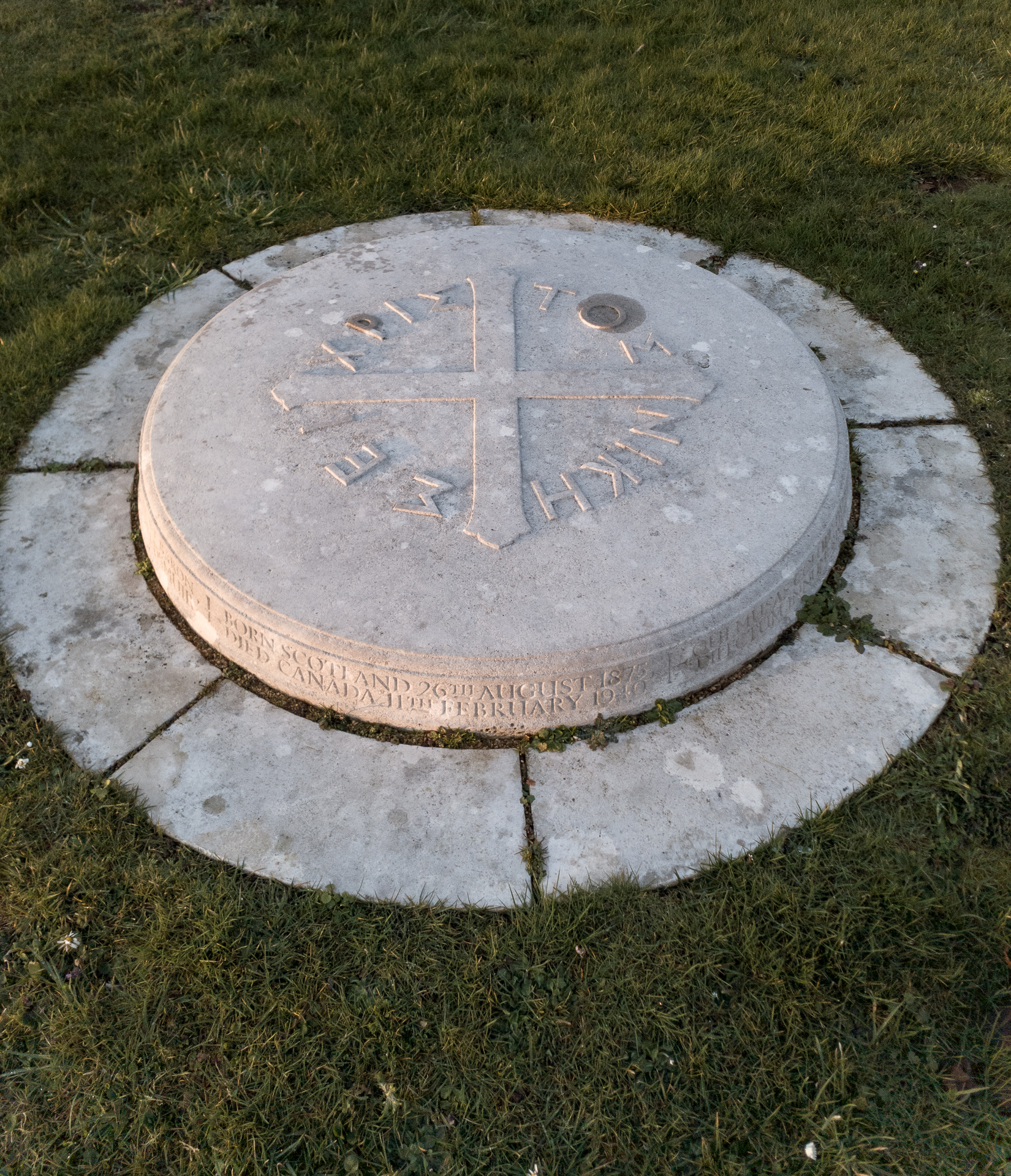
John Buchan's grave at St Thomas of Canterbury, Elsfield

The novelist John Buchan (Governor General of Canada, 1935–1940) lived at Elsfield Manor from 1919 until 1935. His ashes are buried in St Thomas's churchyard.

== Sources and further reading ==
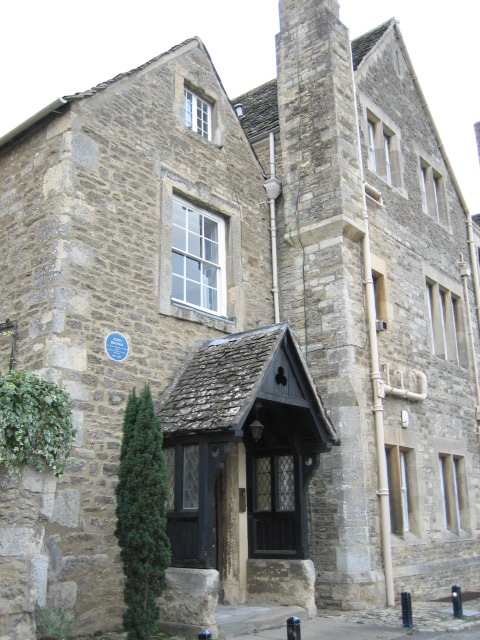
Elsfield Manor

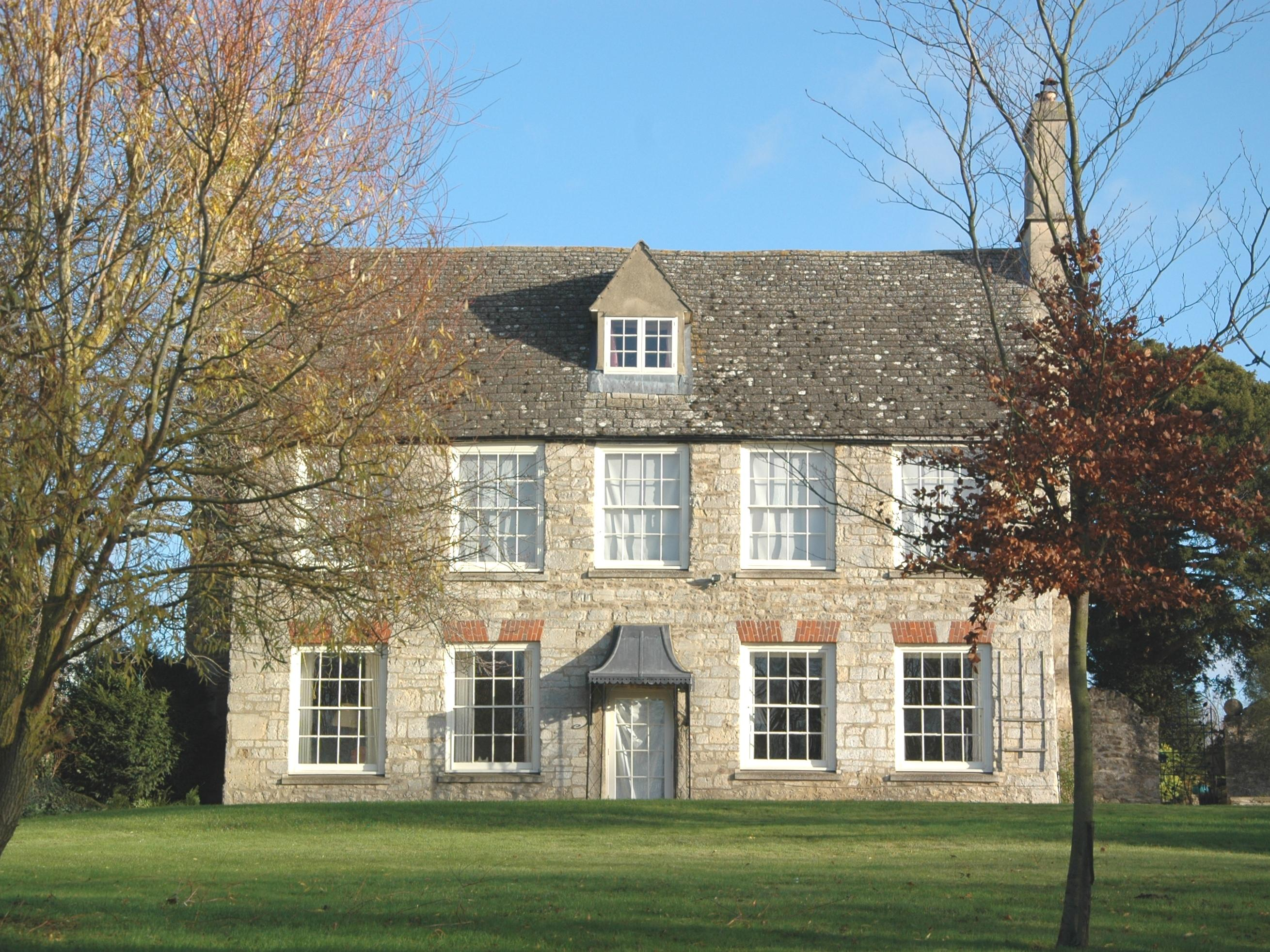
Home Farm house is Georgian, built in the early or mid-18th century. Its porch was added early in the 19th century

- Lobel, Mary D, ed. (1957). A History of the County of Oxford: Volume 5: Bullingdon Hundred. Victoria County History. pp. 116–122.
- Masheder, Mildred (2007). Carrier's Cart to Oxford. Charlbury: The Wychwood Press. ISBN 978-1-902279-28-2.
- Sherwood, Jennifer; Pevsner, Nikolaus (1974). Oxfordshire. The Buildings of England. Harmondsworth: Penguin Books. pp. 591–592. ISBN 0-14-071045-0.
