= John Buchan =

Scottish author and statesman (1875–1940)

The Right Honourable The Lord Tweedsmuir GCMG GCVO CH PC DL
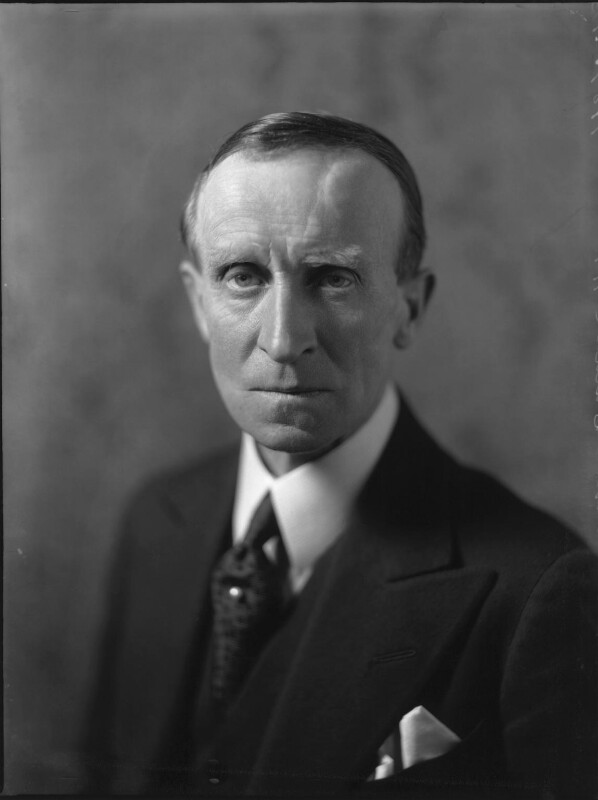
- Buchan in 1935

15th Governor General of Canada
- In office 2 November 1935 – 11 February 1940
- Monarchs: George V; Edward VIII; George VI
- Prime Minister: William Lyon Mackenzie King
- Preceded by: The Earl of Bessborough
- Succeeded by: The Earl of Athlone

Personal details
- Born: John Buchan; 26 August 1875 Perth, Scotland
- Died: 11 February 1940 (aged 64) Montreal, Quebec, Canada
- Party: Scottish Unionist
- Spouse: Susan Grosvenor (m. 1907)
- Children: 4, including John, William and Alastair
- Relatives: O. Douglas (sister)
- Education: University of Glasgow; Brasenose College, Oxford
- Profession: Author
- Website: John Buchan Society
- Writing career
- Genre: Adventure fiction
- Notable work: The Thirty-Nine Steps
- Military service
- Allegiance: United Kingdom
- Branch: British Army
- Service years: 1901–1902; 1916–1919
- Rank: Second Lieutenant
- Units: Colonial Office; Intelligence Corps
- Conflicts: Second Boer War; First World War; Western Front

John Buchan, 1st Baron Tweedsmuir (/ˈbʌxən/; 26 August 1875 – 11 February 1940) was a Scottish novelist, historian, British Army officer, and Unionist politician who served as Governor General of Canada, the 15th since Canadian Confederation.

As a youth, Buchan began writing poetry and prose, fiction and non-fiction, publishing his first novel in 1895 and ultimately writing over a hundred books of which the best known is The Thirty-Nine Steps. After attending Glasgow and Oxford universities, he practised as a barrister. In 1901, he served as a private secretary to Lord Milner in southern Africa towards the end of the Boer War. He returned to England in 1903, continued as a barrister and journalist. He left the Bar when he joined Thomas Nelson and Sons publishers in 1907. During the First World War, he was, among other activities, Director of Information in 1917 and later Head of Intelligence at the newly formed Ministry of Information. He was elected Member of Parliament for the Combined Scottish Universities in 1927.

In 1935, King George V, on the advice of Canadian prime minister R. B. Bennett, appointed Buchan to succeed the Earl of Bessborough as Governor General of Canada and two months later raised him to the peerage as Baron Tweedsmuir. He occupied the post until his death in 1940. Buchan promoted Canadian unity and helped strengthen the sovereignty of Canada constitutionally and culturally. He received a state funeral in Canada before his ashes were returned to the United Kingdom.

== Early life and education ==
Buchan was born at today's 18–20 York Place, a double villa now named after him, in Perth, Scotland. He was the first child of John Buchan – a Free Church of Scotland minister – and Helen Jane Buchan (née Masterton). He was brought up in Kirkcaldy, Fife, and spent many summer holidays with his maternal grandparents in Broughton in the Scottish Borders. There he developed a love for walking and for the local scenery and wildlife, both of which are often featured in his novels. The protagonist in several of his books is Sir Edward Leithen, whose name is borrowed from Leithen Water, a tributary of the River Tweed.

After the family moved to Glasgow, Buchan attended Hutchesons' Boys' Grammar School. He was awarded a scholarship to the University of Glasgow at age 17, where he studied classics as a student of Gilbert Murray, wrote poetry, and became a published author. He moved on to study Literae Humaniores (Greek and Latin Classics) at Brasenose College, Oxford, with a Junior Hulme scholarship in 1895 and in his third year achieved a Senior Hulme scholarship, adding to his financial security. At Oxford, he made many friends including Raymond Asquith, Aubrey Herbert and Tommy Nelson. Buchan won the Stanhope essay prize in 1897 and the Newdigate Prize for poetry the following year; he was also elected as the president of the Oxford Union and had six of his works published, including a book of short stories (Grey Weather, 1899) and three of his first adventure novels (John Burnet of Barns, 1898; A Lost Lady of Old Years, 1899; The Half-Hearted, 1900)

Buchan had his first portrait painted in 1900 by a young Sholto Johnstone Douglas at around the time of his graduation from Oxford.

== Author, journalist, war, and politics ==
After graduating from Oxford, Buchan read for and was called to the Bar in June 1901, as a member of the Middle Temple. In September 1901 he travelled to South Africa to become a private secretary to Alfred Milner, who was then the High Commissioner for Southern Africa, Governor of Cape Colony, and colonial administrator of Transvaal and the Orange River Colony, making Buchan an early member of Milner's Kindergarten. He also gained an acquaintance with a country that would feature prominently in his writing, which he resumed, along with his career as a barrister, upon his return to London in 1903. In 1905, he published a legal book, The Law Relating to the Taxation of Foreign Income. In December 1906, he joined the Thomas Nelson & Sons' publishing company and was also a deputy editor of The Spectator. On 15 July 1907, Buchan married Susan Charlotte Grosvenor—daughter of the Hon. Norman Grosvenor, a son of the 1st Lord Ebury, and a cousin of the Duke of Westminster. Together, Buchan and his wife had four children, Alice, John, William, and Alastair.

In 1910, Buchan wrote Prester John, set in South Africa, another of his adventure novels. He began to suffer from duodenal ulcers, a condition that later afflicted one of his fictional characters, about the same time that he ventured into politics and was adopted as Unionist candidate in March 1911 for the Scottish Borders seat of Peebles and Selkirk. He supported some Liberal causes, such as free trade, national insurance, and curtailing the powers of the House of Lords. But he did not support Home Rule in Ireland and what he considered the class hatred fostered by Liberal politicians such as David Lloyd George.

With the outbreak of the First World War, Buchan began writing a history of the war for Nelson's, the publishers, which was to extend to 24 volumes by the end of the war. He worked in the Foreign Office, and for a time was a war correspondent in France for The Times in 1915. In that same year, his most famous novel, The Thirty-Nine Steps, a spy-thriller set just prior to the First World War, was published. The novel featured Buchan's oft-used hero, Richard Hannay, whose character was partly based on Edmund Ironside, a friend of Buchan from his days in South Africa. A sequel, Greenmantle, came the following year. In June 1916 Buchan was sent out to the Western Front to be attached to the British Army's General Headquarters Intelligence Section, to assist with drafting official communiques for the press. On arrival he received a field-commission as a second lieutenant in the Intelligence Corps.

Recognising his abilities, the War Cabinet, under David Lloyd George, appointed him Director of Information in 1917, essentially leading Britain's propaganda effort. In early 1918, Buchan was made head of a Department of Intelligence within a new Ministry of Information under Lord Beaverbrook. Throughout the war, he continued writing volumes of the History of the War. It was difficult for him, given his close connections to many of Britain's military leaders, not to mention the government, to be critical of the British Army's conduct during the conflict but nonetheless did so in certain instances, being critical of government, politics or statements, or disagreeing with statistics. Buchan could enter comment on political events. He complimented Winston Churchill's "services to the nation at the outbreak of war for which his countrymen can never be sufficiently grateful ... but he was usually selected to be blamed for decisions for which his colleagues were not less responsible."

At one point, Beaverbrook had requested that Buchan meet with journalist and neo-Jacobite Herbert Vivian and admitted to Vivian that he had been a Jacobite sympathiser. Buchan was in fact ambivalent about the Jacobite cause but he did write romances about that adventurous period, for example, A Lost Lady of Old Years (1899), A Book of Escapes and Hurried Journeys (1922) and Midwinter (1923).

Following the close of the war, Buchan turned his attention to writing on historical subjects, along with his usual thrillers and novels. He moved to Elsfield, Oxfordshire in 1920 and had become president of the Scottish Historical Society and a trustee of the National Library of Scotland, and he also maintained ties with various universities. Robert Graves, who lived in nearby Islip, mentioned his being recommended by Buchan for a lecturing position at the newly founded Cairo University. In a 1927 by-election, Buchan was elected as the Unionist Party Member of Parliament for the Combined Scottish Universities. Politically, he was of the Unionist-Nationalist tradition, believing in Scotland's promotion as a nation within the British Empire but also as a constituent of the United Kingdom." The effects of the Great Depression in Scotland, and the subsequent high emigration from that country, also led him to reflect in the same speech: "We do not want to be like the Greeks, powerful and prosperous wherever we settle, but with a dead Greece behind us". He found himself profoundly affected by John Morley's Life of Gladstone, which Buchan read in the early months of the Second World War. He believed that Gladstone had taught people to combat materialism, complacency, and authoritarianism; Buchan later wrote to Herbert Fisher, Stair Gillon, and Gilbert Murray that he was "becoming a Gladstonian Liberal."

After the United Free Church of Scotland joined in 1929 with the Church of Scotland, Buchan remained an active elder of St Columba's Church, London. In 1933 and 1934, Buchan was further appointed as King George V's Lord High Commissioner to the General Assembly of the Church of Scotland.

Beginning in 1930, Buchan aligned himself with Zionism. He was active and vocal in Parliament in condemning the treatment of Jews in Germany. To a mass demonstration organized by the Jewish National Fund in 1934, Buchan described Zionism as "a great act of justice ... a reparation for the centuries of cruelty and wrong which have stained the record of nearly every Gentile people." He was a friend of Chaim Weizmann and assisted him to keep alive Britain's commitment to a Jewish state.

Despite Buchan's support of Zionism, particularly after he became a Member of Parliament and after the rise of the Nazis in Germany, there are conflicting views as to whether his personal views were overtly antisemitic, imperialistic and/or racist, at least in the period when he wrote his early novels. The Penguin Companion to English Literature characterized him as a "convinced imperialist" and commented: "He tells a yarn with economy. The implications of his social and political ideas, conscious and unconscious, are less admirable." A 1996 article in the Scottish newspaper The Herald (Glasgow) opined that Buchan's poem The Semitic Spirit Speaks "is poisoned by prejudice". It is significant that this satirical poem was, however, never published by Buchan, who didn’t like some of the very rich Jews he met in South Africa, nor did he like Rhodes. There were other Jews in South Africa he obviously did like and became friends with, for example, Hermann Eckstein who hosted the couple's engagement party in London in January 1907 and Lionel Philips who had a home in Hampshire and where the newlywed John and Susan Buchan spent the first week of their honeymoon (July 1907). Even in earlier writing, there are favourable depictions of individual Jews, for example, A Lodge in the Wilderness (1906) and the 1912 short story "The Grove of Ashtaroth" which shows an understanding and appreciation of the thoughtfulness and spirituality of Jews.

Buchan was described as being "overtly antisemitic" by author Anthony Storr. The critic Roger Kimball maintained that "some of [Buchan's] attitude and language" could be interpreted as those of "a colonialist ... a racist ... an anti-Semite." Kimball acknowledged that the attitudes and language about Jews and blacks in Buchan's novels are voices of fictional characters but also opines that it is "likely" that Buchan was "anti-Semitic (and anti-foreigner) in the way nearly everyone in his society was," at least until the 1930s. American academic Jordan M. Poss states such accusations warrant looking into. One passage from The Thirty-Nine Steps in particular "seems damning, unless you remember that Scudder [an American who makes disparaging remarks about Jews] is a fictional character—and unless you keep reading" which provides context to these fictional characters who reflect the prejudices of society then.

Buchan's granddaughter Ursula claimed that the charge of antisemitism is almost entirely the result of some unfavourable comments made by his fictional characters, and are not necessarily the views of the author. She points out that in The Thirty-Nine Steps, the antisemitic comments of the murdered freelance spy Scudder are called 'eyewash' by the narrator and proved to be totally wrong by later events. She cautions "it is important to avoid anachronism". "Racial and national stereotyping, favourable and unfavourable, was commonplace throughout all society" so "it is hardly surprising that characters in JB's novels should engage in it." Kimball wrote, "In fact, I believe that Buchan probably is good for you, especially considering the alternatives on offer." If anything, Buchan was philo-Semite. As Kimball wrote, referring to Gertrude Himmelfarb's point that men in 1930s society in England "were normally anti-Semitic, unless by some quirk of temperament or ideology they happened to be philo-Semitic. ... [B]y the time the Nazis came along, Buchan had abandoned any aspersions against Jews in his novels". Kimball continued, "It was precisely that unreasoning attachment to ideology—to the grim nursery of human passions—that Buchan resisted."

As a supporter of the Jewish people and a homeland, Buchan's name was inscribed in the Golden Book of the Jewish National Fund of Israel. His name was also in a Nazi publication, "Who's Who in Britain" (Frankfurt, 1938), reading "Tweedsmuir, Lord: Pro-Jewish activity. In one history of the Jewish experience in Canada, Buchan, as Governor-General Lord Tweedsmuir, is described as the "most visible supporter" of the Jews. Both Tweedsmuir and his wife Susan "spoke publicly in favour of Zionism, lending the cachet of the Crown" to the cause of a Jewish homeland. Susan Tweedsmuir's name was also entered into the Golden Book.

In recognition of his contributions to literature and education, on 1 January 1932, Buchan was granted the personal gift of the sovereign of induction into the Order of the Companions of Honour.

Having previously advocated in the House of Commons for the establishment of a public body for film in the mould of the BBC, Buchan was appointed among the first nine Governors of the British Film Institute after its formation in 1933. Buchan remained in the role until his appointment as Governor General of Canada in 1935.

In 1935, Buchan's literary work was adapted for the cinema with the release of Alfred Hitchcock's The 39 Steps, starring Robert Donat as Richard Hannay, although Buchan's story was much altered. This came in the same year that Buchan was honoured with appointment to the Order of St Michael and St George on 23 May, as well as being elevated to the peerage, when he was ennobled by King George V as Baron Tweedsmuir, of Elsfield in the County of Oxford on 1 June. This had been done in preparation for Buchan's appointment as Canada's governor general; when consulted by Canadian prime minister R. B. Bennett about the appointment, the Leader of His Majesty's Loyal Opposition, William Lyon Mackenzie King, recommended that the King allow Buchan to serve as a commoner, but George V insisted that he be represented by a peer.

Buchan's name had been earlier put forward by Mackenzie King to George V as a candidate for the governor generalcy: Buchan and his wife had been guests of Mackenzie King's at his estate, Kingsmere, in 1924 and Mackenzie King, who at that time was prime minister, was impressed with Buchan, stating, "I know no man I would rather have as a friend, a beautiful, noble soul, kindly & generous in thought & word & act, informed as few men in this world have ever been, modest, humble, true, man after God's own heart." One evening in the following year, the prime minister mentioned to Governor General the Lord Byng of Vimy that Buchan would be a suitable successor to Byng, with which the Governor General agreed, the two being friends. Word of this reached the British Cabinet, and Buchan was approached, but he was reluctant to take the posting; Byng had been writing to Buchan about the constitutional dispute that took place in June 1926 and spoke disparagingly of Mackenzie King.

== Governor General of Canada ==
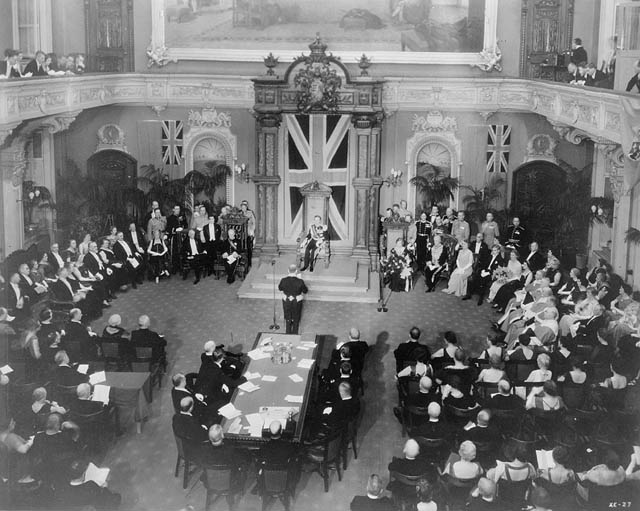
Mackenzie King delivers an address at the installation of Lord Tweedsmuir as Governor General of Canada, 2 November 1935

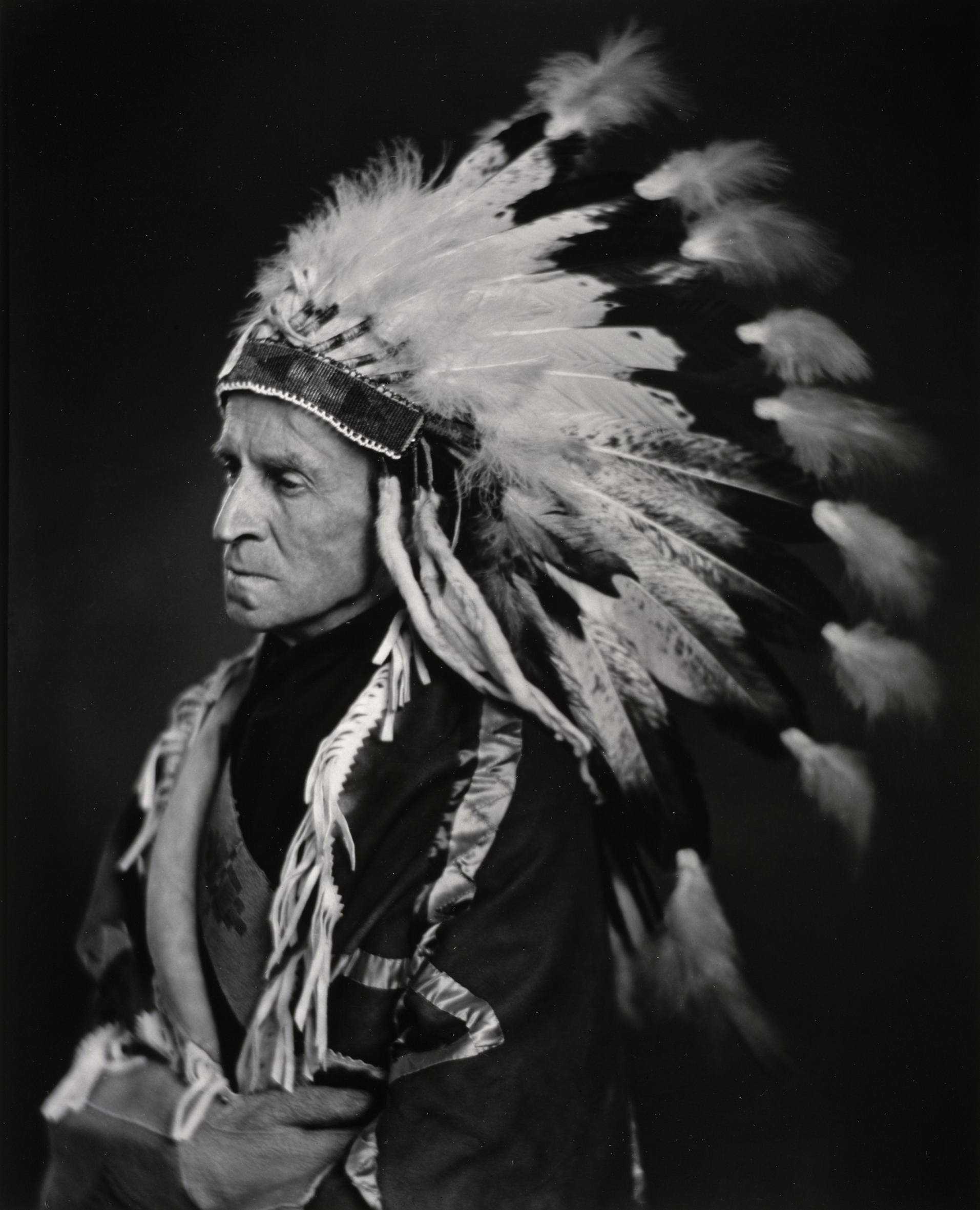
Lord Tweedsmuir in Native headdress, photo portrait by Yousuf Karsh, 1937

On 27 March 1935, Sir George Halsey Perley announced in the Canadian Parliament (in place of ailing Conservative Prime Minister Richard Bedford Bennett) that the King had appointed Mr. John Buchan as the viceregal representative. The King approved the appointment, made by commission under the royal sign-manual and signet. Buchan, by this time elevated to the peerage as the first Baron Tweedsmuir, then departed for Canada and was sworn in as the country's Governor General in a ceremony on 2 November 1935 in the Legislative Council of Quebec (salon rouge) of the parliament buildings of Quebec.

By the time Lord Tweedsmuir arrived in Canada, William Lyon Mackenzie King had been sworn in as Prime Minister after the Liberal Party won the federal election held the previous month. Tweedsmuir was the first Governor General of Canada appointed since the enactment of the Statute of Westminster on 11 December 1931, and was thus the first to have been decided on solely by the monarch of Canada in his Canadian council.

Tweedsmuir brought to the post a longstanding knowledge of Canada. He had written many appreciative words about the country as a journalist on The Spectator and had followed the actions of the Canadian forces in the First World War when writing Nelson's History of the War, and was helped by talks with Julian Byng, during a visit Canada in 1924. He had also written a memoir of a previous Governor General, Lord Minto (1898–1904), published in 1924. His knowledge and interest in increasing public awareness and accessibility to Canada's past resulted in Tweedsmuir being made the Champlain Society's second honorary president between 1938 and 1939. He continued writing during his time in Canada, but he also took his position as Governor General seriously, and from the outset made it his goal to travel the length and breadth of Canada, including to the Arctic regions, and promoting Canadian unity in the process. He said of his job: "a Governor General is in a unique position for it is his duty to know the whole of Canada and all the various types of her people."

Tweedsmuir encouraged a distinct Canadian identity as well as national unity, despite the ongoing Great Depression and the difficulty it caused for the population. He strengthened the sovereignty of Canada, constitutionally and culturally. However, not all Canadians shared Buchan's views. He aroused the ire of imperialists when he said in Montreal in 1937: "a Canadian's first loyalty is not to the British Commonwealth of Nations, but to Canada, and to Canada's King," a statement that the Montreal Gazette dubbed as "disloyal" but that was largely because the news release did not include "and to Canada's King" which Tweedsmuir had added by hand to his typed draft after it had been distributed to the media. Tweedsmuir stated that ethnic groups "should retain their individuality and each make its contribution to the national character" and "the strongest nations are those that are made up of different racial elements."

George V died in late January 1936, and his eldest son, the popular Prince of Wales, succeeded to the throne as Edward VIII. Rideau Hall—the royal and viceroyal residence in Ottawa—was decked in black crepe and all formal entertaining was cancelled during the official period of mourning. As the year unfolded, it became evident that the new king planned to marry the American divorcée Wallis Simpson, which caused much discontent throughout the Dominions and created a constitutional crisis. Tweedsmuir conveyed to Buckingham Palace and the British Prime Minister Stanley Baldwin Canadians' deep affection for the King, but also the outrage to Canadian religious feelings, both Catholic and Protestant, that would occur if Edward married Simpson. By 11 December, King Edward had abdicated in favour of his younger brother, Prince Albert, Duke of York, who was thereafter known as George VI. In order for the line of succession for Canada to remain parallel to those of the other Dominions, Tweedsmuir, as Governor-in-Council, gave the government's consent to the British legislation formalising the abdication, and ratified this with finality when he granted Royal Assent to the Canadian Succession to the Throne Act in 1937. Upon receiving news from Mackenzie King of Edward's decision to abdicate, Tweedsmuir quipped that, in his year in Canada as governor general, he had represented three kings.

Tweedsmuir's desire to strengthen the culture of Canada is reflected in his approval of the establishment of the Governor General's Literary Awards in 1936. This was done after discussion with the Canadian Authors Association, under the chairmanship of Dr. Pelham Edgar. The "GGs", as they are nicknamed in Canada, remain Canada's premier literary awards, announced annually, now with seven categories in English and in French. Tweedsmuir also inspired and encouraged individual writers. In January 1940, despite the war, Tweedsmuir invited influential Canadians to Rideau Hall, including Sam McLaughlin, President of General Motors of Canada, to support, as he wrote to his sister in Scotland, the development of "a Hollywood in British Columbia". This proved prescient; by the 21st century, Vancouver had popularly become known as "Hollywood North".

In May and June 1939, King George VI and Queen Elizabeth toured Canada from coast to coast and paid a state visit to the United States. Tweedsmuir had conceived the royal tour before the coronation in 1937; according to the official event historian, Gustave Lanctot, the idea "probably grew out of the knowledge that at his coming Coronation, George VI was to assume the additional title of King of Canada," and he wished to demonstrate vividly Canada's status as an independent kingdom by allowing Canadians to see "their King performing royal functions, supported by his Canadian ministers." Mackenzie King, however, was not convinced, thinking it wrong to spend money on royalty while the poor were starving. To overcome King's reticence, Tweedsmuir argued that the royal visit "would have a 'unifying' effect on Canada while the visit to the U.S. would be "helpful to relations of democracies. Mackenzie King agreed. Tweedsmuir put great effort into securing a positive response from Buckingham Palace to the invitation; after more than a year without a reply, in June 1938 he used a trip to the United Kingdom for a rest cure at Ruthin Castle in Wales to procure a positive decision on the royal tour. After a period of convalescence at Ruthin Castle and his home near Oxford, Tweedsmuir sailed back to Canada in October with a secured commitment that the royal couple would tour the country and visit the United States. Though he had been a significant contributor to the organisation of the trip, Tweedsmuir remained largely out of sight for the duration of the royal tour; he expressed the view that while the King of Canada was present, "I cease to exist as Viceroy, and retain only a shadowy legal existence as Governor-General in Council." In Canada, the royal couple took part in public events such as the opening of the Lions Gate Bridge in Vancouver in May 1939, and King George sat in Parliament and personally granted Royal Assent to bills passed there. The King appointed Tweedsmuir a Knight Grand Cross of the Royal Victorian Order while on the royal train, between Truro and Bedford, Nova Scotia. The King and Queen began their visit to the United States on 8 June.

The royal visit to the United States was the high point of Tweedsmuir's efforts to develop a strong relationship with President Roosevelt, which he began soon after his arrival in Canada. The objective was to demonstrate, especially to the dictators in Europe, the friendship of America with Canada, as a member of the British Empire and Commonwealth. Roosevelt had to be circumspect and not be seen to have direct relations with Britain because of the strong isolationist opinion in the U.S. concerned about being dragged into another European war. Tweedsmuir and Roosevelt met twice, at the end of July 1936 in Quebec City, summer residence of the Governor General, and the second in the spring of 1937 with an official visit by the Tweedsmuirs to Washington, D.C. Both visits were significant successes.

Buchan's experiences during the First World War made him averse to war, and he tried to help prevent another one in co-ordination with Mackenzie King and the U.S. President Franklin D. Roosevelt by the calling of a conference, to be chaired by the U.S. and to include the European dictators. Those efforts to try to secure future peace and stability proved fruitless because the British prime minister, Neville Chamberlain, refused to countenance the idea.

Tweedsmuir signed Canada's declaration of war against Germany on 10 September, a week after the British declaration of war. The week difference allowed war-related materiel, such as aeroplanes and munitions, to move to Canada from the neutral United States, which was prohibited under the Neutrality Act from exporting such materiel to belligerents. During the fall of 1939, negotiations were held to establish an air training plan in Canada for Commonwealth air crew. The negotiations were long and difficult, in particular with Canadian prime minister Mackenzie King who was adamant that the facilities would be under the control of the Canadian government. Tweedsmuir had known from previous experience with a British mission, which had examined the possibility of aircraft production in Canada in the spring of 1938, that officials in Britain "do not seem to understand the real delicacy of the position of the self-governing Dominions, especially Canada. King had been difficult, as Chamberlain admitted to Tweedsmuir. Tweedsmuir played a key role in securing British agreement to the final negotiations in mid-December 1939 and King acknowledged this in a letter, thank the Governor General "warmly for the help ... What a mischief there would have been had there been another moment's delay!"

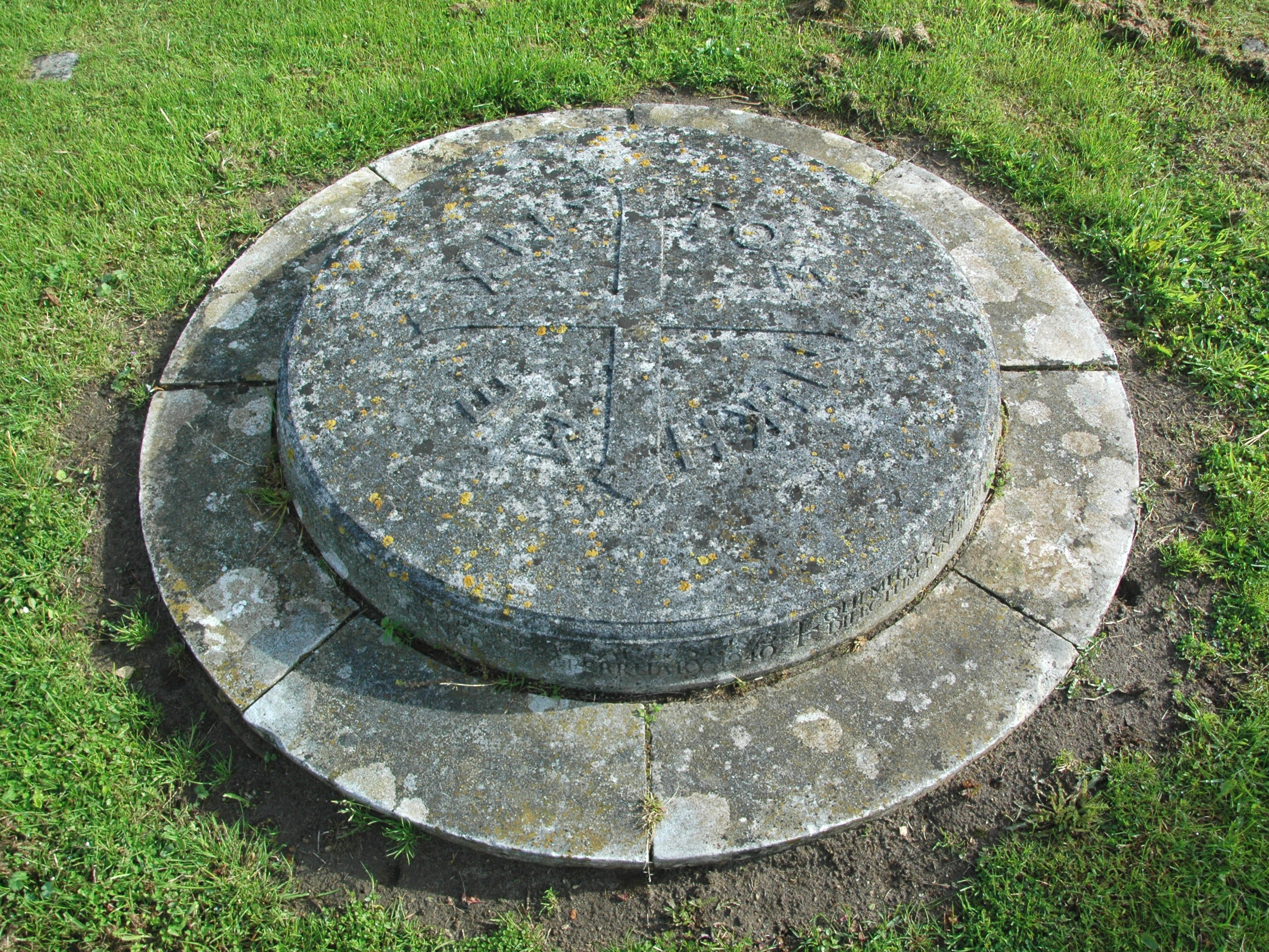
Lord Tweedsmuir's grave in St Thomas's churchyard, Elsfield

On 6 February 1940, he suffered a slight stroke and struck his head on the edge of a bath at Rideau Hall. Two surgeries by Doctor Wilder Penfield of the Montreal Neurological Institute were insufficient to save him, and his death on 11 February saw an outpouring of grief, gratitude and admiration, not only in Canada but throughout the English-speaking world. In a radio eulogy, Mackenzie King stated: "In the passing of His Excellency, the people of Canada have lost one of the greatest and most revered of their Governors General, and a friend who, from the day of his arrival in this country, dedicated his life to their service." The editor of the Ottawa Journal wrote: "He would have prepared us by deeper concern for things spiritual and intellectual, and by allegiance, above all, to the tradition of human dignity and liberty." The Governor General had formed a strong bond with his prime minister, even if it may have been built more on political admiration than friendship: Mackenzie King appreciated Buchan's "sterling rectitude and disinterested purpose."

After lying in state in the Senate chamber on Parliament Hill, Buchan was given a state funeral at St Andrew's Presbyterian Church in Ottawa. His ashes were returned to the UK aboard the cruiser HMS Orion for final burial at Elsfield, the village where he lived in Oxfordshire. In the United Kingdom, a memorial service was held in medieval Elsfield church on the Saturday after his death and services were held later that month at Westminster Abbey and at St. Giles Cathedral in Edinburgh.

== Legacy ==
When Buchan died in Canada in February 1940 as Governor General Lord Tweedsmuir, he was widely and deeply mourned throughout the English-speaking world and beyond, both as writer and statesman. His last role gave emphasis to him as statesman but it is as a writer of popular thrillers for which he is mostly remembered now. Novelist Graham Greene wrote, eleven years after Tweedsmuir's death, that the settings, pace and pursuits in The Thirty-Nine Steps "were to be a pattern for adventure-writers ever since." He and his brother Hugh co-authored The Spy's Bedside Book and dedicated it "To the Immortal Memory of Wm Le Queux and John Buchan." Fifty years after Buchan's death, historian David Stafford wrote that "his impact on the genre was profound, and he has left a mark that has remained strong to this day." J.R.R. Tolkien admired and was influenced by Buchan's adventure stories. And it continues. Distinguished military historian Sir John Keegan in 2004 wrote that Buchan "was a writer touched by genius." In a list of "The 100 best novels written in English, The Guardian newspaper in 2015 placed The Thirty-Nine Steps at 42nd.

Buchan's 100 works and more include nearly 30 novels, seven collections of short stories, and biographies of Sir Walter Scott, Caesar Augustus, and Oliver Cromwell. He was awarded the 1928 James Tait Black Memorial Prize for his biography of the Marquess of Montrose. The "last Buchan" (as Graham Greene entitled his appreciative review) was the 1941 novel Sick Heart River (American title: Mountain Meadow), in which a dying protagonist confronts the questions of the meaning of life in the Canadian wilderness.

In Canada as Governor General, he founded the Governor General's Literary Awards, which remain Canada's premier awards for literature. He and Lady Tweedsmuir established the first proper library at Rideau Hall. His grandchildren Ursula, David, James and Perdita Buchan also became journalists and/or writers. His granddaughter Ursula wrote a biography of him, Beyond the Thirty-Nine Steps: A Life of John Buchan (2019).

As Governor General and statesman, he helped strengthen relations between Britain and America, via his position in Canada as a prominent member of the British Commonwealth, at a critical period in world history. His breadth of experience, interests, knowledge and vision allowed him to be an interpreter of Britain, Canada, and the United States to each other. His contribution to Canada, reflecting his accomplishments and character, were recognized when the Historic Sites and Monuments Board of Canada designated John Buchan, Lord Tweedsmuir, as a "person of national historic significance" in 2010. He left a living legacy in that at least four of his Canadian successors admired or took inspiration from his approach to the role of Governor General: Vincent Massey (1952–1959); General Georges Vanier (1959–1967); Adrienne Clarkson (1999–2005); and David Johnston (2010–2017).

Tweedsmuir Provincial Park in British Columbia is now divided into Tweedsmuir South Provincial Park and Tweedsmuir North Provincial Park and Protected Area. It was created in 1938 to commemorate Buchan's 1937 visit to the Rainbow Range and other nearby areas by horseback and floatplane. He wrote in the foreword to a booklet published to commemorate his visit: "I have now travelled over most of Canada and have seen many wonderful things, but I have seen nothing more beautiful and more wonderful than the great park which British Columbia has done me the honour to call by my name".

Canadian history professor Roger Hall noted in a book review that "a great deal of [Buchan's] success resulted from the extraordinary person he was, adding that "[n]ot many of our contemporary [Governor General] candidates come with those credentials" and "[I]n the end it is Buchan's role as a moral compass that seems most worthy." Buchan's moral certainty was, as historian Sir John Keegan wrote, "one of his strengths as a writer [giving] him the power to achieve something particularly elusive: moral atmosphere."

John Buchan was known as an “inspiring example of a life lived for others”, as Ursula Buchan has written, from humble origins “without money or family influence, he nevertheless carved out a hugely successful writing and public career … His strengths, underpinned by a sincere and unwavering Christian faith, were his intelligence, humanity, clarity of thought, wit, moral and physical courage, a capacity to get on with everybody, from monarchs to miners, and an elegant prose style that appealed to a very wide readership.”

== Honours ==
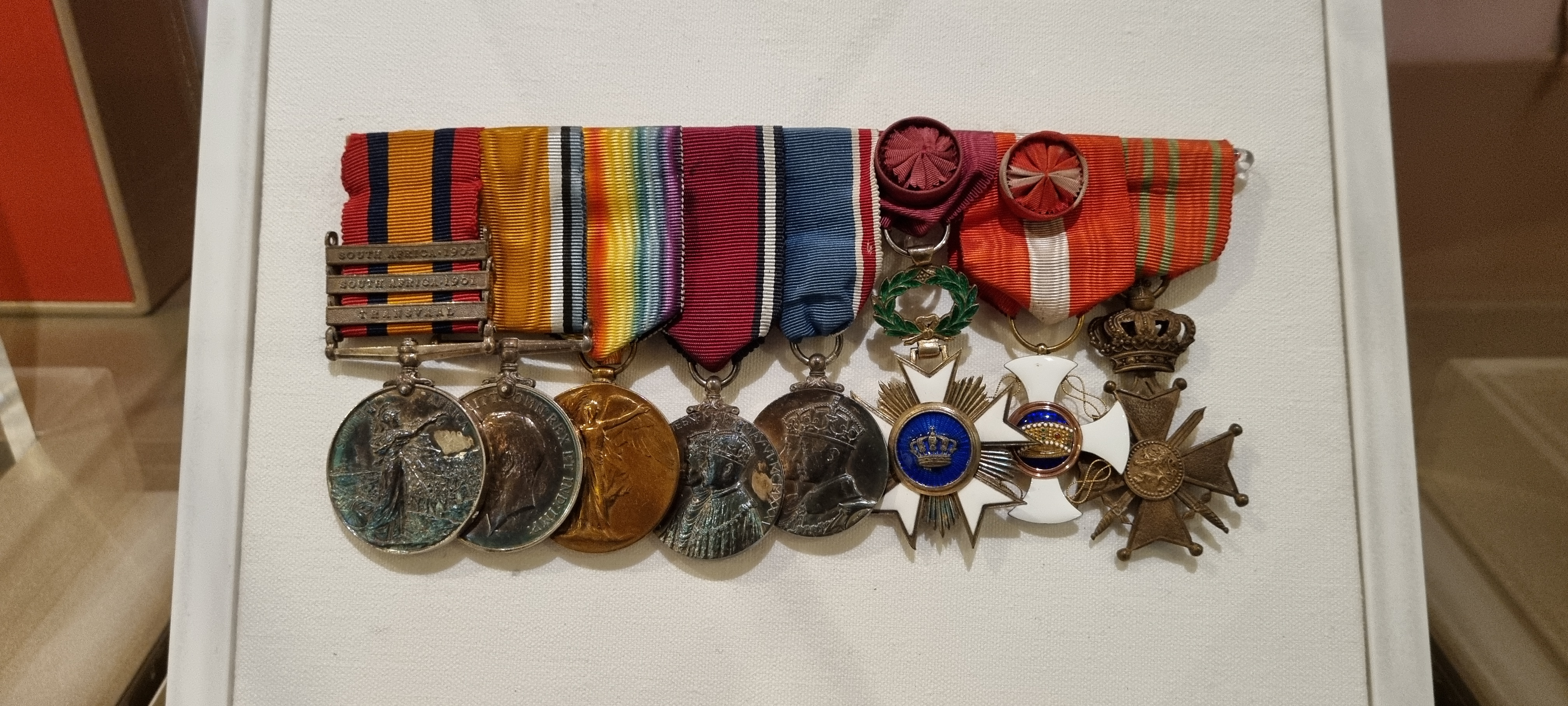
Medals of John Buchan in the National Museum of Scotland

Appointments

- 1 January 1932: Member of the Order of the Companions of Honour (CH)
- (United Kingdom) 23 May 1935: Knight Grand Cross of the Most Distinguished Order of Saint Michael and Saint George (GCMG)
- 2 November 1935: Chief Scout for Canada
- 2 November 1935: Honorary Member of the Royal Military College of Canada Club
- (United Kingdom) 28 May 1937: Member of His Majesty's Most Honourable Privy Council (PC)
- (United Kingdom) 15 June 1939: Knight Grand Cross of the Royal Victorian Order (GCVO)
- (England) : Honorary Fellow of Oxford University

Medals

- (United Kingdom) 1900: Queen's South Africa Medal with three clasps: South Africa 1902, South Africa 1901 and Transvaal
- (United Kingdom) 1918: British War Medal
- (United Kingdom) 1918: Victory Medal
- (Canada) 1935: King George V Silver Jubilee Medal
- (Canada) 1937: King George VI Coronation Medal

Awards

- (England) 1897: Stanhope essay prize
- (England) 1898: Newdigate Prize
- (Scotland) 1928: James Tait Black Memorial Prize
- (Canada) 4 December 1940: Silver Wolf Award (posthumous)

Foreign honours

- : Knight of the Order of the Crown of Belgium
- 15 December 1918: Knight of the Order of the Crown of Italy
- : Croix de Guerre of Belgium

Non-national honours

- (Canada) 1937: Master of the Order of Good Cheer

=== Honorary military appointments ===
- (Canada) 2 November 1935: Colonel of the Governor General's Horse Guards
- (Canada) 2 November 1935: Colonel of the Governor General's Foot Guards
- (Canada) 2 November 1935: Colonel of the Canadian Grenadier Guards

=== Honorary degrees ===
- (England) 20 June 1934: University of Oxford, Doctor of Civil Law (DCL)
- (Canada) 1936: University of Toronto, Doctor of Laws (LLD)
- (Canada) 1936: University of Toronto, Doctor of Divinity (DD)
- (United States) 1937: Harvard University, Doctor of Laws (LLD)
- (United States) 1937: Yale University, Doctor of Laws (LLD)
- (Canada) : McGill University, Doctor of Laws (LLD)
- (Canada) : Université de Montréal, Doctor of Laws (LLD)
- (Scotland) : University of Glasgow, Doctor of Laws (LLD)
- (Scotland) : University of St Andrews, Doctor of Laws (LLD)

=== Honorific eponyms ===
Geographic locations

- British Columbia: Tweedsmuir South Provincial Park
- British Columbia: Tweedsmuir North Provincial Park and Protected Area
- British Columbia: Tweedsmuir Peak
- Ontario: Tweedsmuir Avenue, Ottawa
- Ontario: Tweedsmuir Avenue, Toronto
- Ontario: Tweedsmuir Avenue, London
- Ontario: Tweedsmuir Place, Deep River
- Manitoba: Tweedsmuir Place, Pinawa
- Manitoba: Tweedsmuir Road, Winnipeg
- Quebec: Buchan Street, Montreal
- Saskatchewan: Tweedsmuir
- Scotland: John Buchan Way, Broughton

Schools

- Alberta: Strathcona-Tweedsmuir School, Okotoks
- British Columbia: Lord Tweedsmuir Elementary School, New Westminster
- British Columbia: Lord Tweedsmuir Secondary School, Surrey
- British Columbia: Tweedsmuir Hall (student residence), University of British Columbia
- Ontario: John Buchan Senior Public School, Toronto
- Ontario: Tweedsmuir Public School, North Bay
- Ontario: Tweedsmuir Public School, London

Organisations

- Scotland: John Buchan Story Museum, Peebles, Scottish Borders

== Arms ==
Coat of arms of John Buchan
Crest A sunflower Proper. Escutcheon Azure a fess between three lions' heads erased Argent. Supporters Dexter a stag Proper attired Or collared Gules sinister a falcon Proper jessed belled and beaked Or armed and collared Gules. Motto Non Inferiora Secutus (Not Following Meaner Things) Orders The Most Distinguished Order of St. Michael and St. George - Knight Grand Cross (GCMG).

== See also ==
- List of works by John Buchan
- List of Scottish novelists
- List of European mystery writers

Government offices
Preceded by The Earl of Bessborough	Governor General of Canada; 1935–1940	Succeeded by The Earl of Athlone
Parliament of the United Kingdom
Preceded by Henry Craik; George Berry; Dugald Cowan	Member of Parliament for Combined Scottish Universities; April 1927 – June 1935; With: George Berry to 1931; Dugald Cowan to 1934; Noel Skelton from 1931; George Morrison from 1934	Succeeded by John Graham Kerr; Noel Skelton; George Alexander Morrison
Academic offices
Preceded by J. M. Barrie	Chancellor of the University of Edinburgh; 1937–1940	Succeeded by The Marquess of Linlithgow
Peerage of the United Kingdom
New title	Baron Tweedsmuir; 3 June 1935 – 11 February 1940	Succeeded by John Buchan
