= John Buchan, 2nd Baron Tweedsmuir =

British peer (1911–1996)

The Right Honourable The Lord Tweedsmuir CBE CD FRSE FRSA

Baron Tweedsmuir
- In office 11 February 1940 – 20 June 1996
- Preceded by: John Buchan
- Succeeded by: William Buchan

Personal details
- Born: 25 November 1911
- Died: 20 June 1996 (aged 84)
- Spouse(s): Priscilla Grant (died 1978) Lady Jean Grant (m. 1980)
- Parent(s): John Buchan, 1st Baron Tweedsmuir; Susan Charlotte Grosvenor
- Education: Eton College; Brasenose College, Oxford
- Military career
- Allegiance: United Kingdom
- Branch: Canadian Army
- Service years: 1939-1964
- Rank: Colonel
- Units: Governor General's Foot Guards; Hastings and Prince Edward Regiment
- Conflicts: World War II; Allied invasion of Sicily

John Norman Stuart Buchan, 2nd Baron Tweedsmuir (25 November 1911 – 20 June 1996), commonly called Johnnie Buchan, was a British peer and the son of the novelist John Buchan, 1st Baron Tweedsmuir. He was a colonial administrator, naturalist, and adventurer. He has been described as a "brilliant fisherman and naturalist, a gallant soldier and fine writer of English, an explorer, colonial administrator and man of business."

== Early life ==
Buchan was born in London on 25 November 1911 as the son of John Buchan and Susan Grosvenor.

He was educated at Eton and in 1930 he went to Brasenose College, Oxford, where he graduated with a fourth class degree in History. While at Brasenose College, Buchan was an active member of the Brasenose College Boat Club, and rowed in the College's 1st VIII in Torpids. As an undergraduate, he was also a close friend of future Prime Minister of Australia John Gorton.

According to his father, Buchan was an “ardent bird-lover and fisherman”, and an admirer of Edward Grey.

Buchan subsequently went on to study at the Dundee School of Economics.

== Military career ==
After a period in the Colonial Administrative Service in Uganda, Buchan contracted dysentery and was forced to leave Africa on health grounds. He went to join his parents in Canada in 1936. Here he joined the Hudson's Bay Company. He drove a dog-sled 3000 miles and spent the winter of 1938/9 at the remote Cape Dorset in Baffinland.

In September 1939 at the onset of war, Buchan joined the Governor General's Foot Guards in Canada, and was with the first Canadian troopship to reach England in December 1939. In February 1940 his father died and he became Baron Tweedsmuir. In 1941 he saw active service with the Hastings and Prince Edward Regiment (with whom he started as second in command), ultimately in Sicily for which he was appointed an Officer of the Order of the British Empire (OBE) in the 1946 New Year Honours.

Farley Mowat, who served as an infantryman in the HPE Regiment, described Tweedsmuir, newly in command (due to his predecessor, Bruce Sutcliff, having been killed). Mowat's account is in his war memoir And No Birds Sang. The task was to take Assoro, an ancient, and well-fortified, promontory blocking the regiment's advance.

Going forward on his own reconnaissance that afternoon in company with the new second-in-command, Major 'Ack Ack' Kennedy, Tweedsmuir looked up at the towering colossus of Assoro with the visionary eye of a Lawrence of Arabia, and saw that the only way to accomplish the impossible was to attempt the impossible. He thereupon decided that the battalion would make a right flank march by night across the intervening trackless gullies to the foot of the great cliff, scale that precipitous wall and, just at dawn, take the summit by surprise."

The operation succeeded. Tweedsmuir was later wounded in Sicily. He was twice Mentioned in Dispatches.

== Scientific career ==
Tweedsmuir led scientific expeditions to Libya and St Ninians Island and was 21 years President of the British Schools Exploring Society. He was promoted to be a Commander of the Order of the British Empire (CBE) in 1964.

== Later life ==
In his later life, Tweedsmuir lived in Kingston House at Kingston Bagpuize in rural Oxfordshire. He returned to Scotland for the final two months of his life and died in a small cottage in North Berwick.

Tweedsmuir had no male heir, so upon his death the barony passed to his younger brother.

== Family ==
Tweedsmuir married Priscilla Grant, widow of Sir Arthur Grant, 11th baronet (of Monymusk). She died of cancer in 1978. He remarried in 1980 to Lady Jean Grant.

Lord Tweedsmuir had one daughter by his first wife, also named Priscilla, who married the Baron Selkirk of Douglas in 1974.

With his first wife Priscilla, who sat in the House of Lords in her own right as The Baroness Tweedsmuir of Belhelvie, they jointly created the Protection of Birds Act 1954.

== Positions held ==
- Rector of Aberdeen University 1948-51
- Chairman of the Joint East and Central African Board 1950-52
- President of the Institute of Rural Life 1951-85
- President of the Federation of Commonwealth and British Empire Chambers of Commerce 1955-57
- President of the Institute of Export 1964-67
- Director of BOAC
- Director of Dalgety plc
- Director of Sun Alliance
- Chairman of the Advertising Standards Authority (United Kingdom) 1971-74
- Chairman of the Council on Tribunals 1973-80

== Arms ==
Coat of arms of John Buchan, 2nd Baron Tweedsmuir
Crest A sunflower proper. Escutcheon Azure, a fesse between three lions' heads erased argent. Supporters Dexter: a stag proper attired or collared gules; Sinister: a falcon proper jessed belled and beaked or armed and collared gules. Motto Non inferiora secutus (Not following meaner things).

== Publications ==
- Always a Countryman (1953)
- One Man's Happiness (1968)

Academic offices
Preceded by Eric Linklater	Rector of the University of Aberdeen; 1948–1951	Succeeded by Jimmy Edwards
Peerage of the United Kingdom
Preceded by John Buchan	Baron Tweedsmuir; 1940 – 1996	Succeeded by William Buchan
