= Kingkade =

British DJ

Alex Buchanan—generally known by his stage name Kingkade—is an English DJ and progressive house music producer. He began DJing in 1997, in Liverpool before spreading to other clubnights around the UK, and Europe after 2003. He established his first record label, Minimal Records, in August 2001 and released his first EP "Kalcutter" in October 2001. Later he launched Dirty Blue Records. By 2018, both these labels had ceased, and he formed his third label, Urban Chaos Records.

== Singles & EPs ==
- "Kalcutter", 2001, Minimal Records
- "Fool's Gold", 2003, Moonshine Music
