= Coiled tubing drilling =

Coiled Tubing Drilling (CTD) is a drilling method that combines coiled tubing and directional drilling. It uses a mud motor to create a system for reservoirs.

== Operations ==
CTD has been used in regions such as Alaska, Canada, United Arab Emirates, Oman and Saudi Arabia. Typical applications include depleted wells, unconventional gas shale, underground coal gasification and coal bed methane.

== See also ==
- Bottom hole assembly
- Underbalanced drilling
