= Mount Buchon =

Mountain range in California, United States

- Location within California

Highest point
- Elevation: 552 m (1,811 ft)

Geography
- Country: United States
- State: California
- District: San Luis Obispo County
- Range coordinates: 35°13′19.911″N 120°47′34.638″W
- Topo map: USGS Port San Luis

Mount Buchon, also known as the San Luis Range, is a mountain range in San Luis Obispo County, California.
