= Buchen (disambiguation) =

Buchen is a town in Neckar-Odenwald district, Baden-Württemberg, Germany.

Buchen may also refer to:

- Büchen, a municipality in the district of Lauenburg, Schleswig-Holstein, Germany
- Büchen (Amt), a collective municipality in the district of Lauenburg, Schleswig-Holstein, Germany
- Gustave W. Buchen (1886–1951), American politician and attorney, Wisconsin State Senator
- Philip W. Buchen (1916–2001), American attorney and White House Counsel during the Ford administration
