= James Buchan =

Scottish novelist and historian

James Buchan (born 11 June 1954) is a Scottish novelist and historian.

== Biography ==
Buchan is a son of the late William Buchan, 3rd Baron Tweedsmuir, and grandson of John Buchan, 1st Baron Tweedsmuir, the Scottish novelist and diplomat. He has several brothers and sisters, including the writer Perdita Buchan. Educated at Eton and Magdalen College, Oxford, he began his career as a Financial Times correspondent, writing from the Middle East, Germany, and the United States. In 1986, Buchan married Lady Evelyn Rose Phipps, daughter of Oswald Phipps, 4th Marquess of Normanby. She died in 2018. He has three children and lives in Norfolk, England.

He was elected a Fellow of the Royal Society of Literature in 2001.

== Bibliography ==
=== Novels ===
- A Parish of Rich Women (1984) Whitbread Book of the Year award, Betty Trask Award
- Davy Chadwick (1987)
- Slide (1991)
- Heart's Journey in Winter (1995) (The Golden Plough in US) Guardian Fiction Prize
- High Latitudes (1996)
- A Good Place to Die (1999) (The Persian Bride in US)
- The Gate of Air (2008)

==== The Family of William Neilson ====
- A Street Shaken by Light (2022) (the first volume in a projected six-novel series set in 18th-century Scotland)
- A Chalice Argent (2024)

=== Non-fiction ===
- Frozen Desire: The Meaning of Money (1997)
- Capital of the Mind: How Edinburgh Changed the World (2003) (Crowded with Genius: Edinburgh's Moment of the Mind in US)
- Adam Smith and the Pursuit of Perfect Liberty (2006) (The Authentic Adam Smith: His Life and Ideas in US)
- Days of God: The Revolution in Iran and its Consequences (2012) The Washington Institute for Near East Policy Book Prize (Silver Medal)
- John Law: A Scottish Adventurer of the Eighteenth Century (2018)
