= Mud cake (oil and gas) =

Mud cake (also mudcake) is the layer of particulates from drill mud coating (caking) the inside of a borehole after the suspension medium has seeped through a porous geological formation. Similar to filter cake.

Mud cake provides a physical barrier to prevent further penetration and loss of drilling fluid, as well a later loss of produced fluids, into a permeable formation.
