= List of works by John Buchan =

John Buchan bibliography
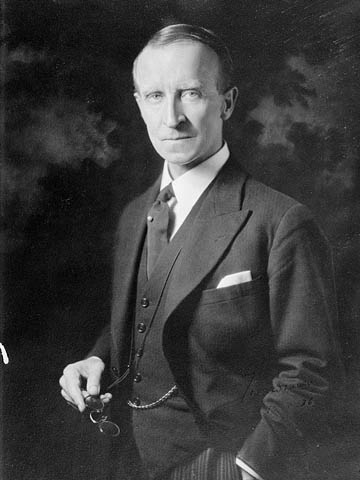
- Buchan in 1936
- Novels↙: 29
- Collections↙: 2
- Poems↙: 4
- Books edited↙: 14
- Non-fiction↙: 42
- Biographies↙: 10

John Buchan, 1st Baron Tweedsmuir (1875–1940), was a Scottish novelist, historian, biographer and editor. Outside the field of literature he was, at various times, a barrister, a publisher, a lieutenant colonel in the Intelligence Corps, the Director of Information—reporting directly to prime minister David Lloyd George—during the First World War and a Unionist MP who served as Governor General of Canada, the fifteenth to hold the office since Canadian Confederation.

Born in Perth, Scotland, Buchan was admitted to the University of Glasgow in 1892 to study classics; during his first year at university he edited the works of Francis Bacon, which were published in 1894. The following year he was awarded a scholarship to Brasenose College, Oxford; shortly after his arrival he also published his first novel, Sir Quixote of the Moors, which he dedicated to Gilbert Murray, his university tutor. By the time he left the university he had published five books, including Scholar-Gipsies, his first work of non-fiction.

Much of Buchan's non-fiction mirrored his circumstances: his time in South Africa resulted in The African Colony, and the First World War led to a series of books about the war in general, and the Scottish and South African forces in particular. He interspersed his non-fiction with further novels, and also wrote ten biographies and four volumes of poetry, as well as numerous articles and stories for magazines and journals. During the war he wrote The Thirty-Nine Steps, the novel which has been adapted for film and television more than any of his other work, (film versions in 1935, 1959 and 1978 and a 2008 television version).

== Editor ==
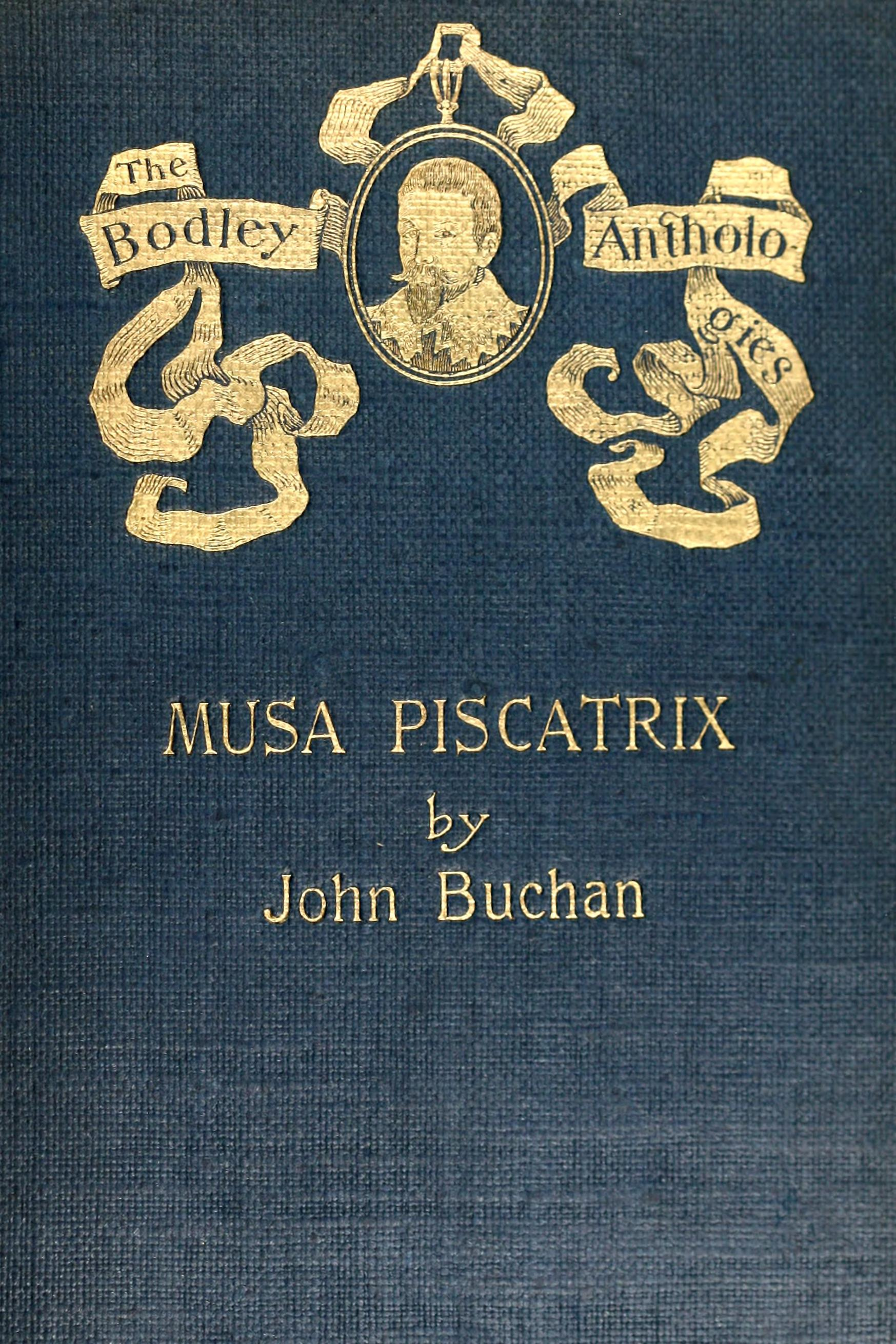
Musa Piscatrix, first UK edition, 1896

The Long Road to Victory, first UK edition, 1920

Buchan was the general editor of the Teaching of History series, published by T. Nelson Publishers between 1928 and 1930. In 1900 he was also a member of the editorial board of The Spectator.

Works edited by Buchan
Title	Year of first publication	Author	First edition publisher (London, unless otherwise stated)	Notes	Ref.
Essays and Apothegms of Francis Lord Bacon	1894	Francis Bacon	Walter Scott Publishing Co		
Musa Piscatrix	1896	Various	John Lane		
The Compleat Angler	1901	Izaak Walton	Methuen Publishing		
The Long Road to Victory	1920	Various	T. Nelson Publishers		
Miscellanies: Literary and Historical	1921	Archibald Primrose, 5th Earl of Rosebery	Hodder & Stoughton		
Great Hours in Sport	1921	Various	T. Nelson Publishers		
The Nations of Today	1923–24	Various	Hodder & Stoughton	Six unnumbered volumes	
A History of English Literature	1923	Various	T. Nelson Publishers	Abridged and published in 1937 as A Shorter History of English Literature.	
The Northern Muse: An Anthology of Scots Vernacular Poetry	1924	Various	Hodder & Stoughton		
Modern Short Stories	1926	Various	T. Nelson Publishers		
Essays and Studies	1926	Members of the English Association	Oxford University Press, Oxford		
South Africa	1927	Various	British Empire Educational Press		
A General Survey of British History	1928	Various	T. Nelson Publishers	Eleven volumes	
The Poetry of Neil Munro	1931	Neil Munro	William Blackwood & Sons		

== Novels ==
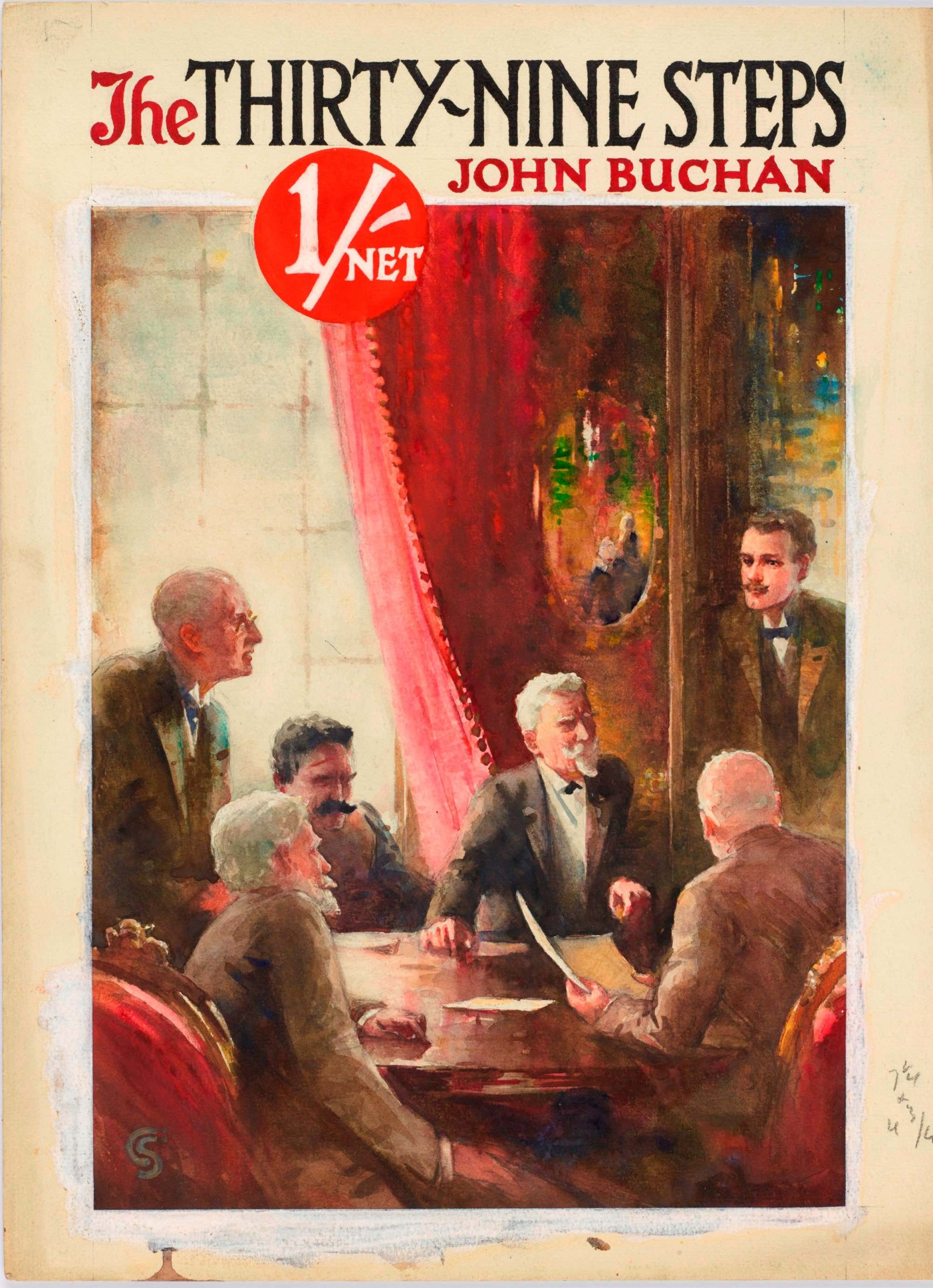
The Thirty-Nine Steps, first UK edition

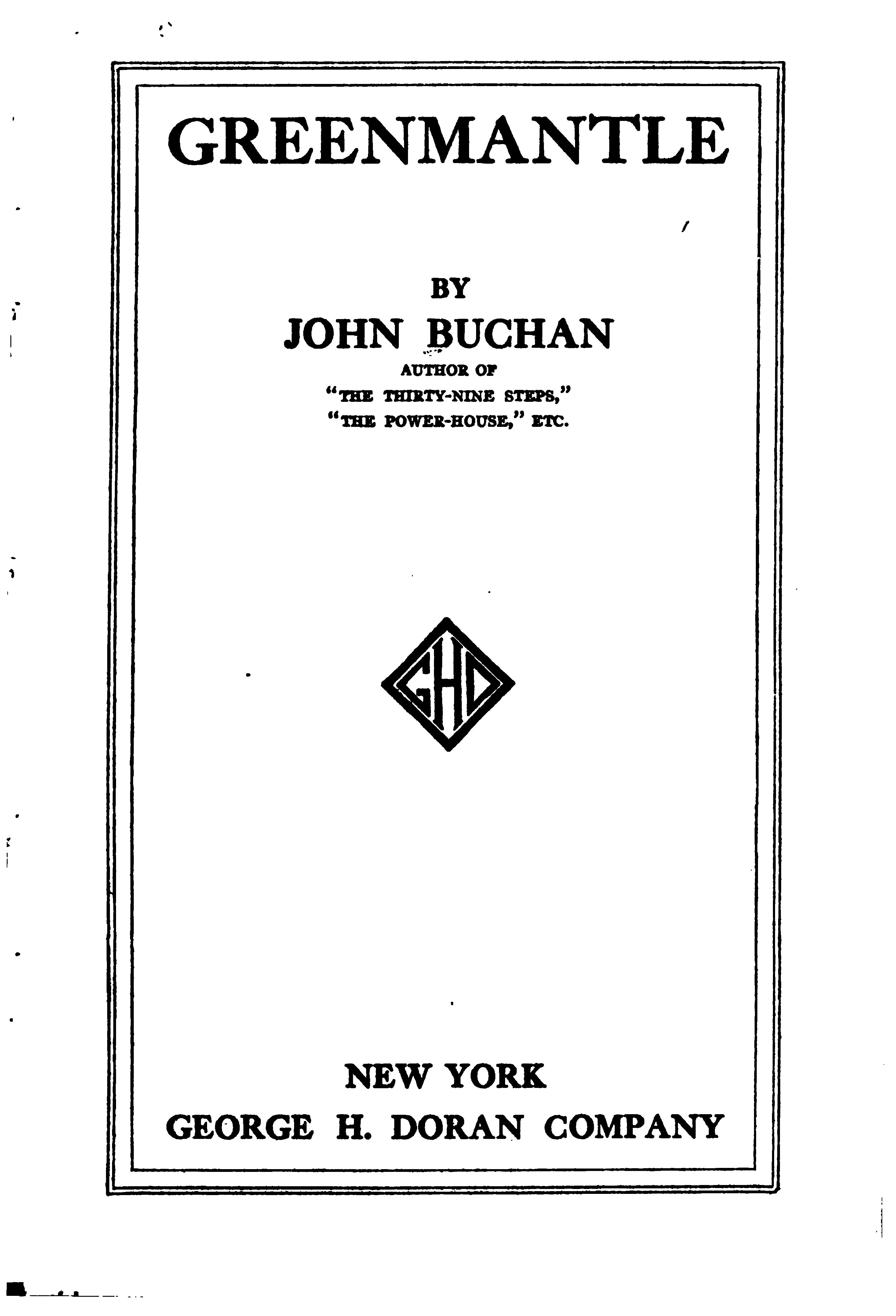
Frontispieces of Sir Quixote of the Moors (1895) and Greenmantle (1916)

Novels by Buchan
Title	Year of first publication	First edition publisher (London, unless otherwise stated)	Ref.
Sir Quixote of the Moors	1895	T. Fisher Unwin	
John Burnet of Barns	1898	John Lane	
A Lost Lady of Old Years	1899	John Lane	
The Half-Hearted	1900	Isbister. Serialised in Good Words, 1900	
A Lodge in the Wilderness	1906	William Blackwood & Sons	
Prester John	1910	T. Nelson Publishers	
Salute to Adventurers	1915	T. Nelson Publishers	
The Thirty-Nine Steps	1915	William Blackwood & Sons	
The Power-House	1916	William Blackwood & Sons	
Greenmantle	1916	Hodder & Stoughton	
Mr Standfast	1918	Hodder & Stoughton	
The Path of the King	1921	Hodder & Stoughton	
Huntingtower	1922	Hodder & Stoughton	
Midwinter	1923	Hodder & Stoughton	
The Three Hostages	1924	Hodder & Stoughton	
John Macnab	1925	Hodder & Stoughton	
The Dancing Floor	1926	Hodder & Stoughton	
Witch Wood	1927	Hodder & Stoughton	
The Courts of the Morning	1929	Hodder & Stoughton	
Castle Gay	1930	Hodder & Stoughton	
The Blanket of the Dark	1931	Hodder & Stoughton	
The Gap in the Curtain	1932	Hodder & Stoughton	
The Magic Walking Stick	1932	Hodder & Stoughton	
A Prince of the Captivity	1933	Hodder & Stoughton	
The Free Fishers	1934	Hodder & Stoughton	
The House of the Four Winds	1935	Hodder & Stoughton	
The Island of Sheep	1936	Hodder & Stoughton	
Sick Heart River	1941	Hodder & Stoughton	

== Non-fiction ==
Cover of Scholar-Gipsies (1896), Buchan's first work of non-fiction

Cover of The Battle of Jutland, a history of the 1916 sea battle

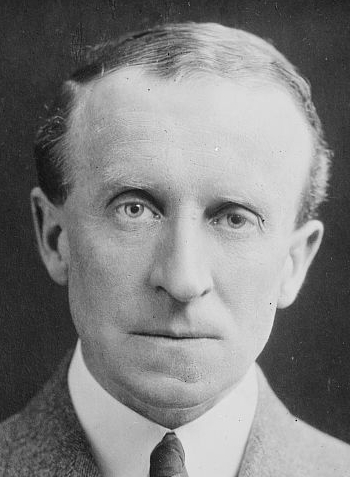
Buchan, c. 1910–15

Non-fiction by Buchan
Title	Year of first publication	First edition publisher (London, unless otherwise stated)	Ref.
Scholar-Gipsies	1896	John Lane	
A History of Brasenose College	1898	Robinson	
The African Colony	1903	William Blackwood & Sons	
The Law Relating to the Taxation of Foreign Income	1905	Stevens	
Some Eighteenth Century Byways	1908	William Blackwood & Sons	
Nine Brasenose Worthies	1909	Clarendon Press, Oxford	
What the Home Rule Bill Means	1912	T. Nelson Publishers	
Nelson's History of the War (24 volumes)	1914–19	T. Nelson Publishers	
Britain's War by Land	1915	Oxford University Press, Oxford	
The Achievement of France	1915	Methuen Publishing	
Ordeal by Marriage	1915	Clay Publishing	
The Future of the War	1916	Boyle, Sons & Watchurst	
The Battle of the Somme, First Phase	1916	T. Nelson Publishers	
The Purpose of War	1916	J. M. Dent & Sons	
The Battle of Jutland	1916	T. Nelson Publishers	
The Battle of the Somme, Second Phase	1917	T. Nelson Publishers	
These for Remembrance	1919	Privately printed, London	
The Island of Sheep (Note: Published anonymously by "Cadmus and Harmonia", ie John and Susan Buchan. Buchan re-used the title for his 1936 novel of the same name.)	1919	Hodder & Stoughton	
The Battle Honours of Scotland 1914–1918	1919	Outram	
The History of the South African Forces in France	1920	T. Nelson Publishers	
A History of the Great War	1922	T. Nelson Publishers	
A Book of Escapes and Hurried Journeys	1922	T. Nelson Publishers	
The Last Secrets	1923	T. Nelson Publishers	
The Margins of Life	1923	Birkbeck College	
Days to Remember (Note: Co-written with Henry Newbolt.)	1923	T. Nelson Publishers	
The History of the Royal Scots Fusiliers 1678–1918	1925	T. Nelson Publishers	
Two Ordeals of Democracy	1925	Houghton Mifflin, Boston, Mass	
The Fifteenth (Scottish) Division 1914-1919 (Note: Co-written with John Stewart.)	1926	William Blackwood & Sons	
Homilies and Recreations	1926	T. Nelson Publishers	
The Causal and the Casual in History	1929	Cambridge University Press, Cambridge	
The Kirk in Scotland, 1560-1929 (Note: Co-written with George Adam Smith.)	1930	Hodder & Stoughton	
Montrose and Leadership	1930	Oxford University Press, Oxford	
The Novel and the Fairy Tale	1931	The English Association	
Andrew Lang and the Borders	1932	Oxford University Press, Oxford	
The Massacre of Glencoe	1933	Peter Davies	
Gordon at Khartoum	1934	Peter Davies	
The King's Grace	1935	Hodder & Stoughton	
Naval Episodes Of The Great War	1938	T. Nelson Publishers	
The Interpreter's House	1938	Hodder & Stoughton	
Presbyterianism Yesterday, Today and Tomorrow	1938	Church of Scotland, Edinburgh	
Memory Hold-the-Door	1940	Hodder & Stoughton	
Comments and Characters	1940	T. Nelson Publishers	
Canadian Occasions	1940	Hodder & Stoughton	

== Biographies ==
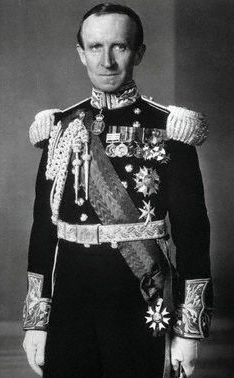
Buchan in ceremonial dress as the Governor General of Canada

Biographies by Buchan
Title	Year of first publication	First edition publisher (London, unless otherwise stated)	Ref.
Sir Walter Raleigh	1897	Blackwell Publishing, Oxford (Note: Revised and enlarged for a second edition in 1911 by T. Nelson Publishers.)	
The Marquis of Montrose	1913	T. Nelson Publishers	
Andrew Jameson, Lord Ardwall	1913	William Blackwood & Sons	
Francis and Riversdale Grenfell: A Memoir	1920	T. Nelson Publishers	
Lord Minto: A Memoir	1924	T. Nelson Publishers	
The Man and the Book: Sir Walter Scott	1925	T. Nelson Publishers	
Montrose	1928	T. Nelson Publishers	
Sir Walter Scott	1932	Cassell	
Julius Caesar	1932	Peter Davies	
Oliver Cromwell	1934	Hodder & Stoughton	
Augustus	1937	Hodder & Stoughton	

== Poetry collections ==
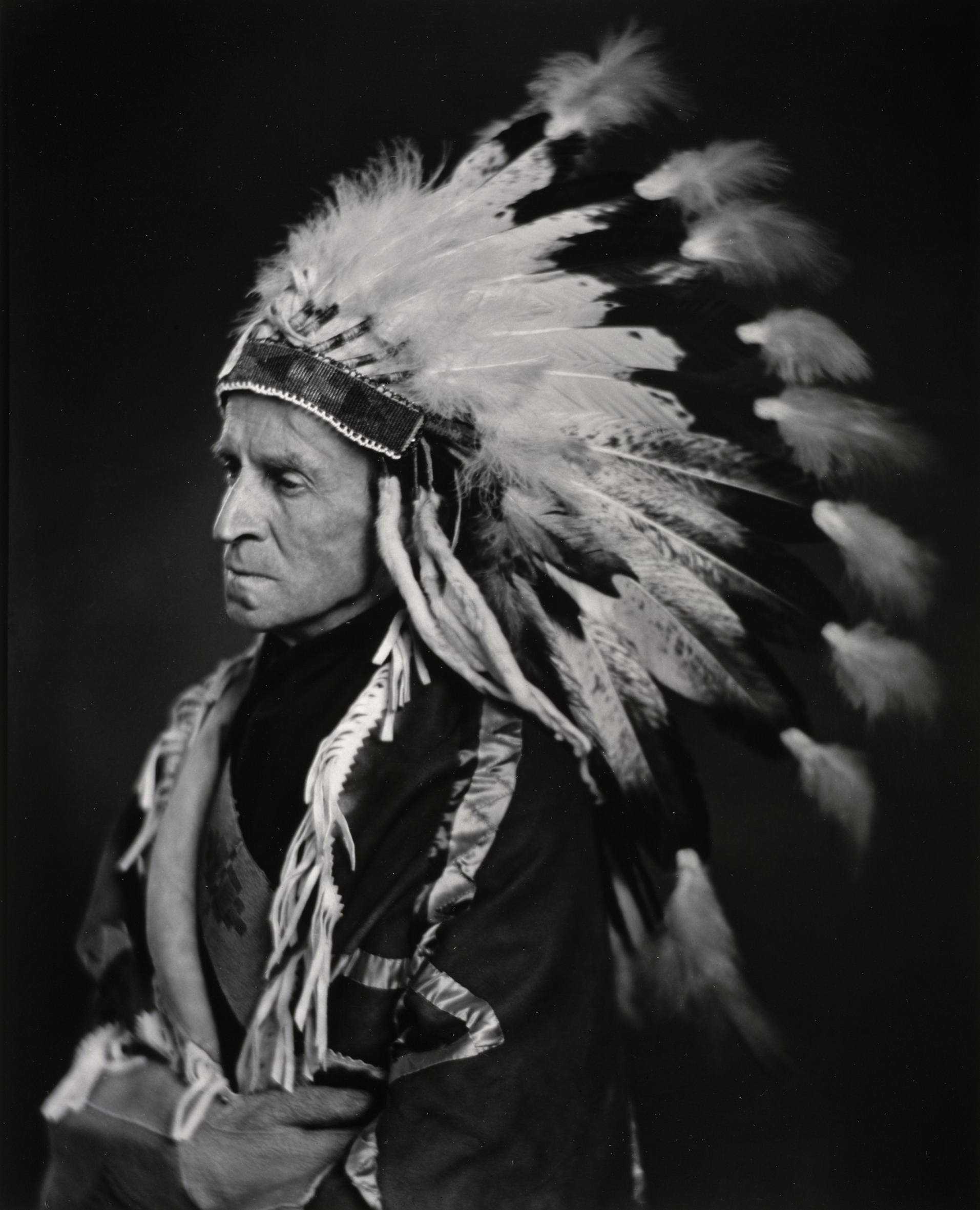
Buchan in native Indian ceremonial head dress

Poetry collections by Buchan
Title	Year of first publication	First edition publisher (London, unless otherwise stated)	Ref.
The Pilgrim Fathers	1898	Blackwell Publishing, Oxford	
Grey Weather: Moorland Tales of My Own People (includes short stories)	1899	John Lane	
The Moon Endureth: Tales and Fancies (includes short stories)	1912	W Blackwood & Sons	
Poems: Scots and English	1917	T.C. & E.C. Jack	

== Short story collections ==
Short story collections by Buchan
Title	Year of first publication	First edition publisher (London, unless otherwise stated)	Ref.
Grey Weather: Moorland Tales of My Own People (includes poetry)	1899	John Lane	
The Watcher by the Threshold, and other tales	1902	W Blackwood & Sons	
The Moon Endureth: Tales and Fancies (includes poetry)	1912	W Blackwood & Sons	
The Runagates Club	1928	Hodder & Stoughton	
The Long Traverse	1941	Hodder & Stoughton	
The Far Islands and Other Tales of Fantasy	1984	Donald M. Grant, Publisher, West Kingston, RI	

== Notes and references ==
=== Sources ===
- Cox, J. Randolph (1988). "John Buchan". In Benstock, Bernard; Staley, Thomas (eds.). British Mystery Writers, 1860–1919. Detroit: Gale Research. ISBN 978-0-8103-1748-2.
- Daniell, David (June 1992). "The Non-Fiction Works of John Buchan". The Book and Magazine Collector (99). Diamond Publishing Group.
- Lownie, Andrew (2013). John Buchan: The Presbyterian Cavalier. London: Thistle Publishing. ISBN 978-1-9096-0999-0.
- MacLeod, Helen (April 1988). "The Novels of John Buchan". The Book and Magazine Collector (49). Diamond Publishing Group.
- MacLeod, Helen (December 1984). "John Buchan". The Book and Magazine Collector (10). Diamond Publishing Group.
- Matthew, H. C. G. (2004). "Buchan, John, first Baron Tweedsmuir". Oxford Dictionary of National Biography (online ed.). Oxford University Press. doi:10.1093/ref:odnb/32145. (Subscription or UK public library membership required.)
