= Huntingtower =

Huntingtower may refer to:

- Huntingtower, a part of the village of Huntingtower and Ruthvenfield, near Perth, Scotland
- Huntingtower Castle, near the village of Huntingtower, Scotland
- Huntingtower (novel), a 1922 novel by John Buchan
- Huntingtower (film), a 1927 British film based on the novel
- Huntingtower School, Melbourne, Australia
- Huntingtower: Ballad for Band, a musical composition by Ottorino Respighi
