= Coulter, South Lanarkshire =

Coordinates: 55°35′23″N 3°32′59″W

Coulter
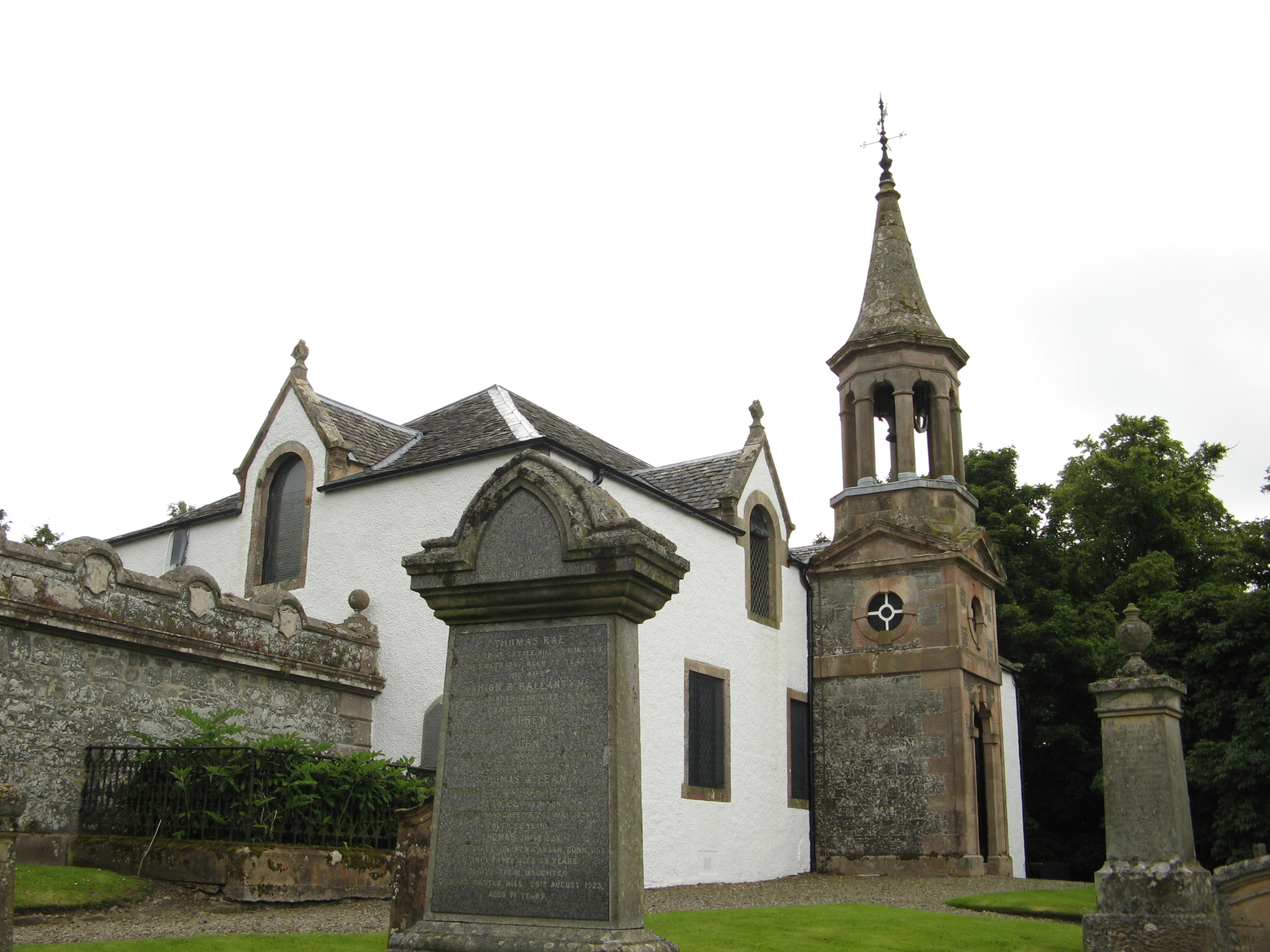
- Coulter Kirk

- Location within South Lanarkshire
- OS grid reference: NT024338
- Council area: South Lanarkshire
- Lieutenancy area: Lanarkshire
- Country: Scotland
- Sovereign state: United Kingdom
- Post town: Biggar
- Postcode district: ML12
- Police: Scotland
- Fire: Scottish
- Ambulance: Scottish
- UK Parliament: Dumfriesshire, Clydesdale and Tweeddale
- Scottish Parliament: Clydesdale

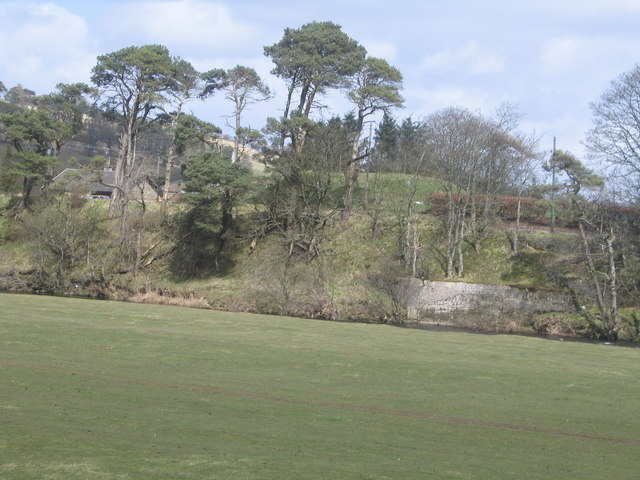
Coulter Motte hill

Coulter or Culter (both spellings in use, pronounced "Cooter" with no "l") is a small village and civil parish in South Lanarkshire, Scotland. It lies approximately 3 miles (4.8 km) south of Biggar. Some old maps and local modern houses also have the spelling Cootyre - "a safe place for cows."

Nearby are two notable Scottish hills, Tinto and Culter Fell. The River Clyde is also nearby. Coulter Village at Culter House is on the watershed between the Clyde and the Tweed.

The village has a mill which has been converted to a restaurant. The second recorded Mill some time about 1880. The site of the first since the burn, Culter Water, was diverted to its present course is unknown.

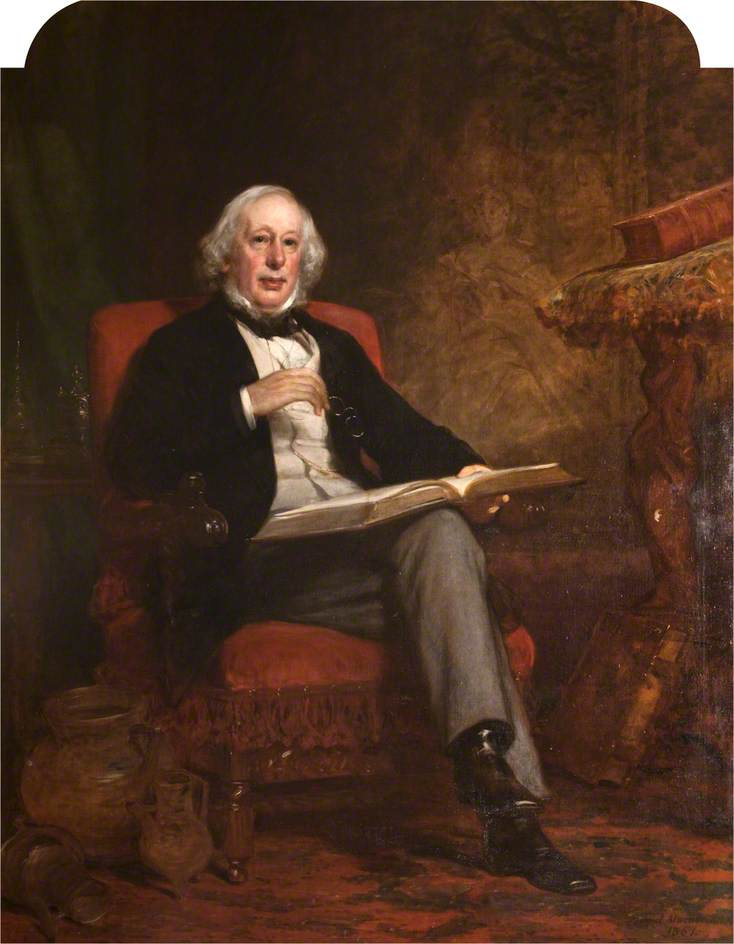
Portrait of the antiquarian Adam Sim of Coulter Mains (1805–1868) by Daniel Macnee (1806-1882), in Biggar Museum.

The village is the likely location of the fictional Midculter from Dorothy Dunnett's 6-book series The Lymond Chronicles. Within that series, Midculter is the home of the Crawford Barons of Culter and of the protagonist, Francis Crawford of Lymond. A possible location for their castle, Midculter Castle, is Coulter Motte.

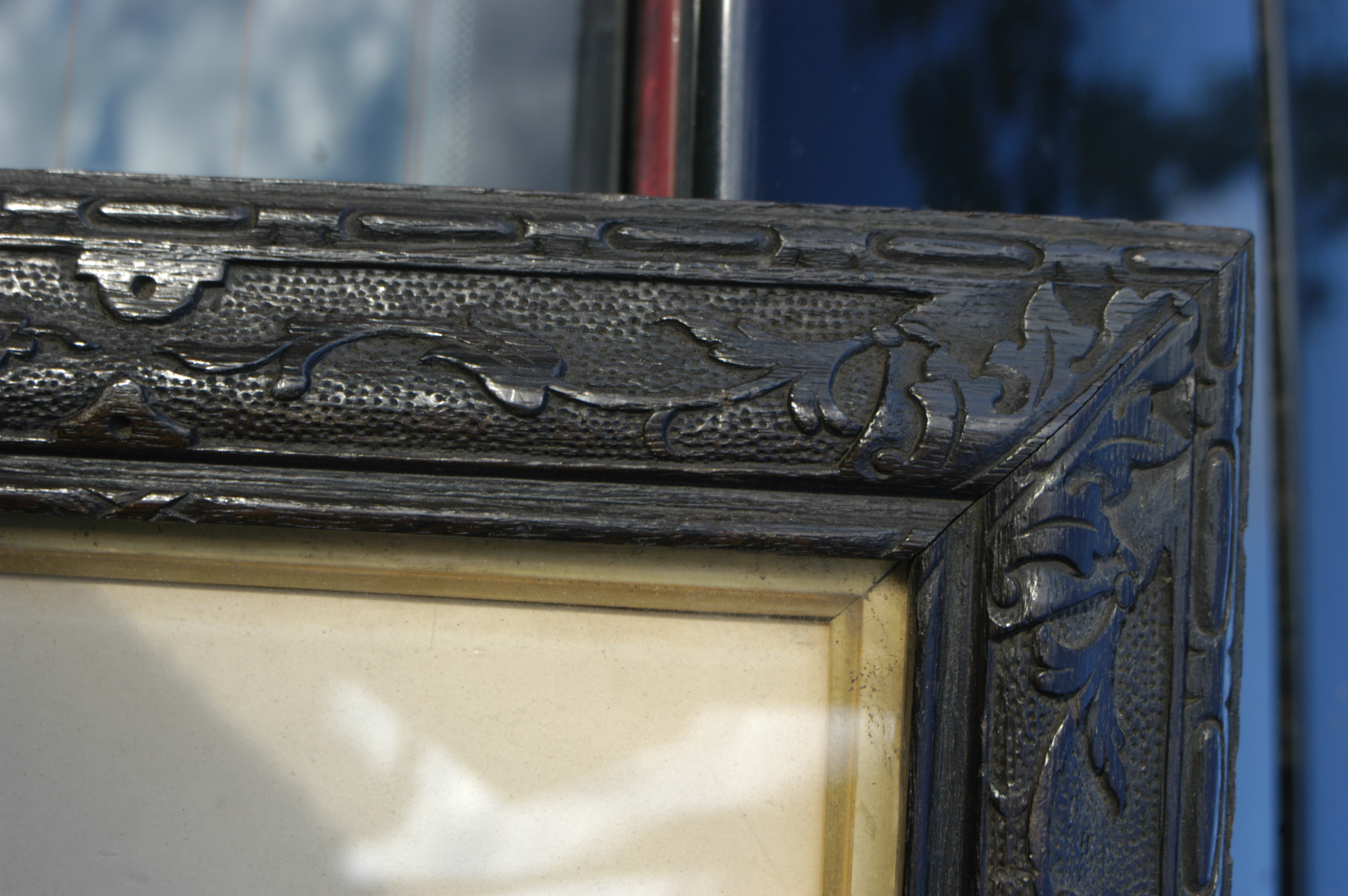
Detail of the picture frame made from oak tree found six foot underground in an avenue, Coulter, in 1859.

Coulter Motte lies some distance from the village on the side of the Clyde at Wolf Clyde, it is a small lump of ground adjacent to the river at a point where it is diverted by ditch toward the Tweed, to alleviate the flood water. Some enterprising person in the past had the idea of fully diverting the waters of the Clyde at this point toward the Tweed. It does not accommodate the descriptions in the Books of the Lymond Series of avenue of Trees, and surrounding hillsides- mention of the closeness to the major River do not appear.

The Monks of Kelso and the Templars feature in the early history of Culter, many place, and farm names would enforce the latters presence.

A more likely site of the Castle of Culter referred to fictionally in the books of Dorothy Dunnett would be Culter House (circa 1680) later of course than the date of the series but nonetheless the oldest inhabited house in the upper ward of Lanarkshire, with its attendant mile long avenue of trees, extant on Roys map of 1746/7, and mentioned in Buchan's John Burnet of Barns.

One famous son would be James Gillray (1757-1815), a memorial to whom rests in the Kirkyard. Caricaturist - political satirist of the Georgian and Napoleonic period.

Coulter Mains was built in the Elizabethan Gothic style in 1838, designed by William Spence (1806-1883). The local antiquarian Adam Sim (1805–1868) lived there with his large collection of objects, many of which are now in the National Museum of Antiquities, Edinburgh.
