= Henry Stamper =

Scottish actor (1937–2009)

- Born: Henry Thomas Stamper; 2 March 1937; Edinburgh, Scotland
- Died: 18 January 2009 (aged 71); Eastbourne, Sussex, England
- Occupation: Actor

Henry Stamper (2 March 1937 – 18 January 2009) was a Scottish actor known for his mastery of almost all British regional dialects. He appeared in several small television roles, but was best known for performing in many radio plays.

He earned a place in the Guinness Book of Records for performing 56 parts in a radio play, They Came to Britain, which was broadcast in six parts by the BBC in 1971. His most notable stage appearance may be his portrayal of Hugh MacDiarmid at the 1977 Edinburgh Festival Fringe, which won him a Fringe First award.

One of his earliest radio performances was in a radio adaptation of Felix Jackson's novel So Help Me God in 1961. He portrayed Ebenezer Pitten in a 1964 radio serial based on John Buchan's The Free Fishers. In 1966, he voiced Mr Mortimer in If You're Glad, I'll be Frank, a radio play by Tom Stoppard, and Viscount Devenham in a radio serial adapted from Jeffery Farnol's The Amateur Gentleman. He was Long John Silver in a 1967 radio series based on Treasure Island. An example of his work in the 1970s was his portrayal of Minister Donald Schooler in the 1977 radio series Aliens in the Mind by Robert Holmes. In 1985, he voiced McAllister in the Blandings radio series.

Between 1985 and 1993, he played Inspector Mackenzie in the Raffles radio series.

His television credits include episodes of Redcap, Doctor Who, Doctor Finlay's Casebook, The Avengers, Z-Cars, The National Dream, BBC2 Playhouse, Birds of Prey, and Oliver Twist.

He married Helen Redmond in 1968, and the marriage ended in an amicable divorce around ten years later. He was later the partner of Betty Huntly Wright until her death in 1991.
