= The Far Islands and Other Tales of Fantasy =

1984 short story collection by John Buchan

- Cover of the first edition
- Author: John Buchan
- Illustrator: Larry Dickison
- Cover artist: Larry Dickison
- Language: English
- Genre: Fantasy
- Publisher: Donald M. Grant, Publisher
- Publication date: 1984
- Media type: Print (hardback)
- Pages: 206 pp
- ISBN: 0-937986-68-2
- OCLC: 12230351
- Dewey Decimal: 823/.912 21
- LC Class: PR6003.U13 F37 1984

The Far Islands and Other Tales of Fantasy is a collection of fantasy short stories by John Buchan, edited by John Bell. It was first published in 1984 by Donald M. Grant, Publisher in an edition of 1,100 copies. The stories originally appeared in the magazines Blackwood's, The Atlantic Monthly, The Pall Mall Magazine and Adventure.

== Contents ==
- "John Buchan: Adventurer on the Borderland", by John Bell
- "The Grove of Ashtaroth" (The Moon Endureth, 1912)
- "The Outgoing of the Tide" (The Atlantic Monthly, January 1902; The Watcher by the Threshold, and other tales, 1902)
- "Skule Skerry" (Adventure (US), 15 April 1928; The Pall Mall Magazine, (UK) May 1928; The Runagates Club, 1928)
- "The Far Islands" (Blackwood's Magazine, November 1899; The Watcher by the Threshold, and other tales, 1902)
- "The Wind in the Portico" (The Pall Mall Magazine, March 1928; The Runagates Club, 1928)
- "No-Man’s-Land" (Blackwood's Magazine, January 1899; The Watcher by the Threshold, and other tales, 1902)
