= The House of the Four Winds =

1935 novel by John Buchan

- First edition cover
- Author: John Buchan
- Language: English
- Series: Dickson McCunn
- Genre: Ruritanian romance
- Set in: Evallonia (fictional)
- Publisher: Hodder & Stoughton
- Publication date: 1935
- Media type: Print
- Pages: 318
- Preceded by: Castle Gay

The House of the Four Winds is a 1935 adventure novel by the Scots author John Buchan. It is a Ruritanian romance, and the last of his three Dickson McCunn books. The novel is set in the fictional Central European country of Evallonia and opens two years after the events recounted in Castle Gay.

== Plot introduction ==
At the beginning of the novel, several characters formerly seen in Huntingtower and Castle Gay are about to go to Europe for the summer: Dickson McCunn to a German Kurhaus for his health; Alison Westwater to join her parents Lord and Lady Rhynns at Unnutz in Germany; Archie Roylance to attend a dull conference in Geneva along with his wife Janet; John 'Jaikie' Galt on a walking tour; and Dougal Crombie on a mission for his newspaper.

== Plot ==
While on his walking tour Jaikie meets Randal Glynde - now proprietor of the Cirque Doré - who encourages him to visit Evallonia, and arranges for him to meet one of the leading monarchists, Prince Odalchini, at his castle 'The House of the Four Winds'. On the way he meets Count Paul 'Ashie' Jovian, a friend from Cambridge who is now a leader of the youth group Juventus. Juventus, like the monarchists, wants to overthrow the corrupt and unpopular government, but many of its leaders see Prince John as a puppet of his conservative backers. After meeting Prince Odalchini, Jaikie is captured by Juventus who have been picketing the castle.

Meanwhile, in Unnutz, Alison stumbles across a cottage in the woods and sees Prince John disguised as a woodcutter, and his republican enemy, Mastrovin, lurking in the village. She receives a letter from Jaikie asking her to come to Evallonia. Janet and Archie Roylance arrive from Geneva and agree to travel with her. Realising that Prince John is in deadly peril they agree that he should travel with Randal Glyde, disguised as a member of the Cirque Doré.

Jaikie is asked by Ashie to visit Prince Odalchini again, this time covertly, to open a dialogue with the monarchists. The visit has to be kept secret from the other leaders of Juventus, particularly Countess Araminta Troyos who is a powerful voice in the movement.

An old friend of Jaikie's, the journalist Dougal Crombie, interviews Ashie and relays details of the situation in Evallonia to Dickson McCunn who is recuperating in Germany. On hearing that Prince John is in peril, McCunn decides that he has to travel to Evallonia to assist, remembering the vow that he had made to the prince in Castle Gay. He resolves as a first step to visit Prince Odalchini.

Unable to gain access to the castle because of the Juventus picketers, McCunn is just leaving when his car narrowly avoids a collision with another vehicle containing Archie, Janet and Alison. They join forces and gain entrance to the castle through the cellars. They find that Jaikie is with Prince Odalchini, and they discuss how to restore Prince John to his rightful throne. Although Prince John would be supported as king by most of the Juventus rank-and-file, the Juventus leaders' deep distrust of the prince's conservative backers would probably result in their immediately instructing their followers to remove him.

McCunn suggests a ruse: the monarchists should pretend to switch their support to a stalking horse candidate. He will quickly be removed by Juventus, who will then switch their allegiance to Prince John once he is no longer apparently supported by his hated backers. McCunn suggests that he could himself play the stalking horse role, impersonating the elderly Archduke Hadrian, the late king's brother who is currently living quietly in France.

Mastrovin captures Jaikie along with Archie, Alison and Janet, and takes them to his headquarters. Randal arranges for the Cirque Doré to pass by, and Jaikie escapes from a first-floor window onto the back of an elephant.

The local press announces that Hadrian is on his way from France to take the throne. Although the Juventus rank-and-file are pleased, Countess Araminta is not, and she directs her followers that Hadrian be stopped. Jaikie persuades her to call a halt, and to provide some men to help rescue Archie, Janet and Alison. In the resultant fracas Mastrovin is shot dead, Countess Araminta becomes attracted to Prince John, believing that he saved her life, and Alison realises that she loves Jaikie.

The counterfeit Archduke (McCunn) is smuggled out of Evallonia just before his intended coronation on the pretence that he is too old and frail to go through with it.

== Principal characters ==
=== Locals ===
- Prince John, rightful king of Evallonia
- Prince Odalchini, leader of the monarchists
- Count Paul 'Ashie' Jovian, leader of the Juventus youth movement, graduate of Cambridge University
- Countess Araminta Troyos, another leader of Juventus
- Mastrovin, leader of the republicans.

=== Scots ===
- Dickson McCunn, retired 62-year-old Glasgow grocer
- John 'Jaikie' Galt, recent graduate of Cambridge University
- Alison Westwater, daughter of Lord Rhynns, loved by Jaikie
- Dougal Crombie, old friend of Jaikie's, a journalist
- Sir Archibald 'Archie' Roylance, Member of Parliament
- Janet Roylance, his wife, cousin of Alison
- Randal Glynde, another cousin of Alison, adventurer and proprietor of the Cirque Doré.

== Critical reception ==
The novel received mostly poor initial reviews. The New Statesman and Nation thought it "disappointing, too involved and too ruritanian", and considered it to occupy "a rather low point" in Buchan's output, a view that later critics have not substantially challenged. Punch, however, thought that "readers of Huntingtower and Castle Gay will welcome old friends in this delectable narrative of the tangled policies of Evallonia", and that no-one will complain that "the long-bow of romance is often drawn by the long arm of coincidence when the mark is well and truly hit".

In The Interpreter's House (1975), David Daniell noted that while the novel does contain some striking images and scenes, it does not represent Buchan at his best. According to Buchan's biographer Andrew Lownie, writing in 2013, this is one of the least popular of Buchan's books, perhaps because of the uneasy mixture of comedy and drama. Although there are some similarities with The Prisoner of Zenda, "Ruritania was not Buchan's country".
