= Vera Voronina =

Russian actress

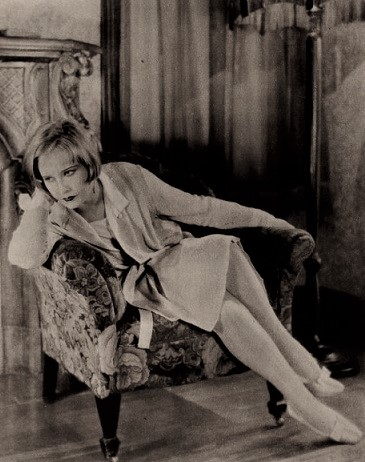
Voronina in 1927

Vera Voronina (c. 1904 – 1942?) was a Russian actress.

== Biography ==
Voronina was born in Odessa, then part of the Russian Empire, but her family fled after the Russian Revolution of 1917. She starred in films in several countries including Germany, Britain, Sweden, and the United States. The information about her life is very scarce and even her death year is disputed. She arrived in the USA in January 1927 and stayed for about two years. Her name was given as Wera Awramow aged 22 born in Odessa and she was traveling with her husband Nikolaus Awramow, a lawyer born in Kyiv aged 34.

== Selected filmography ==
- Sons in Law (1926)
- She Is the Only One (1926)
- The Heart of a German Mother (1926)
- Huntingtower (1927)
- The Whirlwind of Youth (1927)
- Time to Love (1927)
- The Patriot (1928)
- Tales from the Vienna Woods (1928)
- Inherited Passions (1929)
- Why Cry at Parting? (1929)
- Call of the Blood (1929)
