= Dickson McCunn trilogy =

Series of novels by John Buchan

The Dickson McCunn Trilogy is a series of novels by John Buchan, all featuring his eponymous retired grocer from Glasgow. The books are titled Huntingtower, Castle Gay and The House of the Four Winds. Penguin published an omnibus edition, The Adventures of Dickson McCunn, in 1994.

== Huntingtower ==
Huntingtower is a 1922 novel, initially serialised in Popular Magazine between August and September 1921. It is the first of Buchan's three Dickson McCunn books, the action taking place in the district of Carrick in Galloway, Scotland.

== Castle Gay ==
Castle Gay is a 1930 novel. The action is set in the Scottish district of Carrick, Galloway some six years after the events described in Huntingtower.

== The House of the Four Winds ==
The House of the Four Winds is a 1935 novel. It is a Ruritanian romance set in the fictional Central European country of Evallonia, and opens two years after the events recounted in Castle Gay.
