= The Magic Walking Stick =

1932 children's novel by John Buchan

- Author: John Buchan
- Language: English
- Genre: Children's novel
- Publisher: Hodder & Stoughton
- Publication date: 1932
- Publication place: England
- Media type: Print
- Pages: 215

The Magic Walking Stick is a 1932 novel by the Scottish author John Buchan, his only novel for children. The first edition was illustrated by John Morton-Sale.

== Plot ==
The novel relates the adventures of Bill, an English schoolboy from a wealthy family. When Bill returns home from his boarding school for his autumn half-term break, his father's keeper offers to take him duck shooting on the family's estate. On the way, he meets a little wizened old man in a green coat sitting under a hornbeam – apparently invisible to the keeper – who sells him a stick for a farthing. Bill discovers that by twisting the stick and making a wish he has the power to go magically wherever he desires.

Bill rises early to try out the stick again and wishes himself in the Solomon Islands. He finds himself on a beautiful beach of blinding white sands, though the natives are unfriendly and Bill has to return home in a hurry. His next chance to try the stick is in the Christmas holiday, and this time Bill takes his younger brother Peter and a pet dog with him to the family's Scottish estate. The dog is accidentally left there, and Bill has to return to rescue him.

At home in his library, Bill's father discovers an old volume with a 12th century tale which tells of the two staves mentioned in the Book of Zechariah 11:7, one called "Beauty", which favours the pursuit of pleasure, and the other "Bands", which should be used only for serious purposes. According to the Latin text, these two staves were real sticks with magical power. They looked alike but each had to be used for its own appointed purpose. If one were used with the wrong motive, it would simply disappear. Bill is sure his stick must be one of the two lost staves, but he cannot decide which.

Bill plays a prank on some selfish neighbours, rescues his uncle Bob, an aviator whose plane has been lost over the Sahara, and visits an elephants' graveyard.

From a picture paper, Bill learns of young prince Anatole, heir to the throne in the Balkan kingdom of Gracia, who has been imprisoned by the ambitious Prime Minister, Kuno. Over several adventures, Bill rescues Anatole and helps him to take his rightful place as Gracia's king. But when Bill starts to think himself clever and quite proud of what he has been able to achieve, the stick disappears on his next trip home. He comes to believe that his staff was "Bands", and that it did not approve of his thinking too much of his own amusement.

The novel ends with a call to readers to look out for the stick, or failing that for the man who sold it. It is wise, the author says, "always to have a farthing in your pocket, for he won't give change".

== Publication ==
The novel was first published in 1932 by Hodder & Stoughton, in an edition illustrated by John Morton Sale. In 1935, Associated Newspapers published The Magic Walking-Stick and Stories from the Arabian Nights, combining Buchan's novel, illustrated by Vernon L Soper, with Frances Jenkins Alcott's re-telling of the Arabian Nights tales, illustrated by Monro S Orr.

== Background ==
The Magic Walking Stick is Buchan's only novel for children. An early short version of the story was contained in a contribution that Buchan had made to Lady Cynthia Asquith's short story collection Sails of Gold (1927). Its genesis was a game that Buchan used to play with his own children.
