= Time to Love (1927 film) =

1927 film

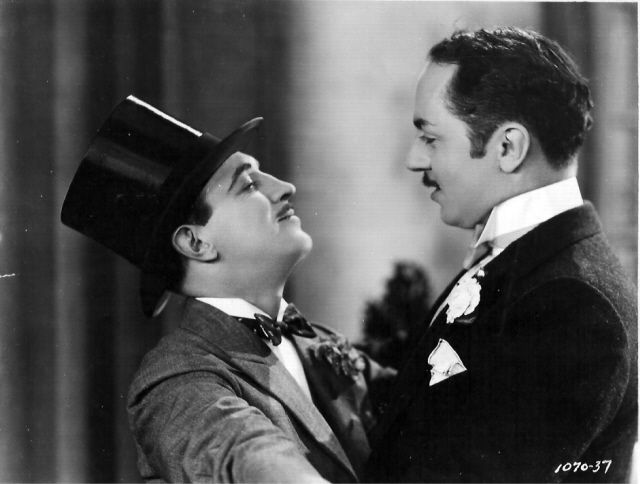
- Raymond Griffith and William Powell
- Directed by: Frank Tuttle
- Written by: Pierre Collings; Alfred Savoir
- Produced by: Jesse L. Lasky; B.P. Schulberg; Adolph Zukor
- Starring: Raymond Griffith; William Powell; Vera Voronina
- Cinematography: William Marshall
- Edited by: Verna Willis
- Production company: Paramount Pictures
- Distributed by: Paramount Pictures
- Release date: June 18, 1927
- Running time: 50 minutes
- Country: United States
- Languages: Silent; English intertitles

Time to Love is a lost 1927 American silent comedy film directed by Frank Tuttle and starring Raymond Griffith, William Powell and Vera Voronina.

== Plot ==
A short (five-reel) feature, this farce is about Alfred Sava-Goiu, a Frenchman and Alado, a prince vying for the hand of the Countess Elvire. Alfred feigns death in a duel, only to return disguised as a spirit; he abducts his lady love from the altar and they make their escape in a hot air balloon; the two are ultimately married by a nearsighted minister.

== Cast ==
- Raymond Griffith as Alfred Sava-Goiu
- William Powell as Prince Alado
- Vera Voronina as Countess Elvire
- Josef Swickard as Elvire's father
- Mario Carillo as Duellist #1
- Pierre de Ramey as Duellist #2
- Helen Giere as Elvire's guardian
- Alfred Sabato as Hindu mystic
- Oliver Eckhardt as Mayor

== Preservation ==
With no holdings located in archives, Time to Love is considered a lost film.

== Bibliography ==
- Monaco, James. The Encyclopedia of Film. Perigee Books, 1991.
