= Sir Quixote of the Moors =

1895 novel by John Buchan

- First edition 1895
- Author: John Buchan
- Language: English
- Genre: Novel
- Set in: Scotland
- Publisher: T Fisher Unwin
- Publication date: 1895
- Media type: Print
- Pages: 188

Sir Quixote of the Moors: being some account of an episode in the life of the Sieur de Rohaine is an 1895 short novel by the Scottish author John Buchan. It was Buchan's first novel, written when he was nineteen and an undergraduate at Glasgow University. Buchan's original title was Sir Quixote (as reflected on the first edition's cover but not spine or title page), and he was annoyed by the addition of "of the Moors" by his publisher.

== Setting ==
The novel is set in Galloway in Scotland during the Covenanting period (the middle or late seventeenth century).

== Preface ==
In an introductory preface, the author explains that the main narrative is supposed to have been written by the Sieur de Rohaine, "to while away the time during the long and painful captivity, born with heroic resolution, which preceded his death".

== Plot ==
Jean de Rohaine, a French soldier and gentleman in his late 30s, has become impoverished through gaming. Recalling an invitation from an old Scottish friend, Quentin Kennedy, Rohaine travels to Galloway to stay with him. Rohaine enjoys Kennedy's boorish hospitality for a month but longs for some military action. He is pleased when Kennedy asks him to ride out with his dragoons to ‘redd the marches’ [sort out some local issues] on behalf of the King, but is horrified to find that this involves persecuting and butchering the local Covenanting cottagers. He leaves indignantly on horseback, and rides off in bad weather across the moors.

Lost, Rohaine stumbles across a local inn. He stays the night, just managing to escape as he is about to be robbed and murdered by the innkeeper and a band of ruffians. As he continues across the moor his physical condition worsens and he eventually collapses, ill and exhausted, at the threshold of the manse of Lindean. He is taken in and cared for by Anne, daughter of the elderly minister Ephraim Lambert. She is betrothed to Henry Semple, a young laird also staying there who has been driven from his own nearby estate by the King’s soldiers.

A visitor arrives to warn Lambert and Semple that a warrant has been issued for their arrest after they were spotted at an illegal religious meeting. Since arrest will mean almost certain death they need to flee immediately, and their only option is to hide out on the moors. Unable to take Anne with them, and unwilling to leave her unprotected, Semple extracts from a rather unwilling Rohaine his word of honour to remain in the house as her protector until the fugitives can return.

As the weeks go by, Anne’s bearing changes from reserved and sombre to open and light-hearted. Rohaine realises that she has fallen in love with him, and he with her, though they never speak of their feelings and he does nothing to betray his position of trust.

Rohaine is informed that the authorities know of Lambert and Semple’s hiding place, and he goes to warn them. Semple comes to the manse, concealing himself from Anne, and tells Rohaine that Lambert is near to death. Semple is wild-eyed, fanatical, and appears to have lost his reason.

Rohaine spends a tormented night agonising over the conflict between his desire for Anne and his pledge to protect her for Semple. He ultimately decides that his oath prevents him from declaring his love, and that he must leave. In the morning, as he prepares to depart, she at last openly declares herself, but he is resolute. The novel ends with him riding away: “A fierce north wind met me in the teeth, and piercing through my tatters, sent a shiver to my very heart."

== Unauthorised American ending ==
A pirated version of the book published in the United States significantly changed Buchan's ending by adding without his knowledge an unauthorised final paragraph:

I cannot recall my thoughts during that ride: I seem not to have thought at all. All I know is that in about an hour there came to my mind, as from a voice, the words: ‘Recreant! Fool!’ and I turned back.

It is this unauthorised US version that has been digitised by Project Gutenberg and FadedPage.

== Critical reception ==
Although Sir Quixote received little review coverage on publication, what it did receive was generally good. One reviewer noted that Buchan's anachronistic tendency to scrutinise motive "lifts the romance far above such ingenious trifling as ... Hope's Prisoner of Zenda".

David Daniell in The Interpreter's House (1975) stated that while Sir Quixote is "an uncomfortable book" it is nevertheless "a little masterpiece, astonishingly percipient for an adolescent Victorian". Daniell perceived a difference between Buchan's "literary" and "observed" landscapes, with the former being that of a writer who has read a great deal of French romance, or who has nicely compressed Sir Walter Scott. Buchan's observed Scottish landscape, on the other hand, is quite different: he has seen it, and has brooded on the words for it. Daniell also commended Buchan's understanding of the power of religious experience, forced to a dilemma without solution, the awakening of passion and the loss of innocence; these he considered to be the characteristics of a story by Henry James".

Writing for the John Buchan Society website, Ronald Hargreaves suggested that the novel exhibits many of the notable features of Buchan's later works, including compelling descriptions, narrative pace, skilful storytelling, and concepts of honour and duty. The idea of the nobility of sacrifice is central, as it would be many years later in Buchan's last work, Sick Heart River.
