= John Morton-Sale =

John Dalton Morton-Sale (29 January 1901-14 March 1990) was an English painter, illustrator, and publisher. He was born in Kensington and, after a brief spell in the British Civil Service, attended Putney School of Art and Central School of Art in London. He studied under A.S. Hartrick and Gerald Spencer Pryse alongside Isobel Laurie Lucas (b. 15 May 1904), whom he married in 1924. They had one daughter, Roysia Romanelli (b. 1928). Their artistic relationship was symbiotic and complementary, working together to illustrate a large number of books, including some by Eleanor Farjeon, although each produced work individually.

John Morton-Sale's earliest assignments included dustwrappers for London After Midnight (1928) by Marie-Coolidge Rask, a book based on the 1927 film London After Midnight starring Lon Chaney, and The Amateur Gentleman (1930) by Jeffery Farnol, He went on to illustrate The Magic Walking Stick (1932) by John Buchan, and an edition of Alice's Adventures in Wonderland (1933) by Lewis Carroll. The original painting for the frontispiece of Arthur Davenport's A Country Holiday (1933) is in the Victoria and Albert Museum. In Good Afternoon Children (1932) he illustrated stories and plays from the BBC's Children's Hour. He produced portfolios of colour illustrations for the Bookman Christmas Special Number for three consecutive years - 1931, 1932 and 1933 - the first consisting of six colour plates of his illustrations for Arnold Bennett's The Old Wives' Tale (1908).

In 1937 the Morton-Sales moved to Edgemoor, Devon, near Dartmoor, where they established separate studios. John was 'happiest when painting landscape, out-of-doors'. He had begun to work collaboratively with his wife, Isobel Morton-Sale, illustrating The Yellow Cat (1936) by Mary Grigs together. They went on to illustrate many children's books, taking inspiration from the scenery around them; influenced by the Neo-Romantic movement, the Morton-Sales' illustrations depicted children as 'natural beings who are part of the natural world'. It was their illustration of Eleanor Farjeon's Martin Pippin in the Daisy Field (1937), which 'matched the mellow fantasy of the text' that established the couple's popularity as illustrators of children's books. Farjeon stayed at their house and they had 'picnics on the moors and walks through picturesque villages'. Isobel Morton-Sale described how they asked Eleanor Farjeon to write the verses for Cherrystones (1942) and The Mulberry Bush (1945). Together with Farjeon's The Starry Floor (1949) these were republished in 1958 as Then There Were Three. The pair also illustrated Beverley Nichols' The Tree that Sat Down (1945), which was written while Nichols was staying nearby, the Morton-Sales contributing illustrations as the writing progressed, and 'possibly influencing its outcome'. They became close friends with novelist Elizabeth Goudge who lived in Cockington, Devon, and John illustrated the dustwrappers of her bestsellers Green Dolphin Country (1944), Gentian Hill (1949) and The Heart of the Family (1953).On one visit Goudge was inspired by Isobel's paintings to write four short stories for children - The Good Little Girl, The Bad Little Girl, Shufflewing and Serena the Hen - which the Morton-Sales published in 1964 with illustrations by Isobel. They also illustrated books by Anya Seton, Rose Macaulay, Compton MacKenzie and J.M. Barrie. The final book illustrated by the Morton-Sales was unusual: in Something Particular (1955) by Ann Driver and Rosalind Ramirez (a royal tutor), they observed and took inspiration from experimental mime, music and dance performed by children at St. James's Palace, London.

At the outbreak of the Second World War, John Morton-Sale contributed a painting to The Queen's Book of the Red Cross (1939). During the War, he devised a widely-used camouflage system. He illustrated a dustwrapper for A Man Arose (1941) by Cecil Roberts, a poem about Winston Churchill. In the years immediately after the Second World War, he exhibited paintings at the Leicester Galleries and the Royal Institute of Painters in Water Colours.

The Morton-Sales founded the Parnassus Gallery in 1952. They printed, published and sold high-quality fine-art reproductions of their own work and that of other artists as well as greetings cards and postcards. Parnassus Gallery cards were among the first to be sold at the Royal Academy and the Victoria and Albert Museum. The pair retired from the Parnassus Gallery in 1977.

John Morton-Sale died at Chagford, Devon, on 14 March 1990. Isobel Morton-Sale died in Moretonhampstead, Devon, on 25 November 1992.

Retrospectives of the work of John and Isobel Morton-Sale were held at the Maas Gallery, London, in 1984 and at the Chris Beetles Gallery, London, in 1996.
