= Huntingtower (film) =

1928 film

- Trade ad in Kinematograph Weekly
- Directed by: George Pearson
- Written by: John Buchan (novel); Charles E. Whittaker
- Produced by: George Pearson
- Starring: Harry Lauder; Vera Voronina; Patrick Aherne
- Production companies: Welsh, Pearson and Company
- Distributed by: Paramount Pictures
- Release date: 1928
- Running time: 7,192 feet
- Country: United Kingdom
- Languages: Silent film English intertitles

Huntingtower is a 1928 British silent adventure film, made at Cricklewood Studios. It was directed by George Pearson and starred Harry Lauder, Vera Voronina and Patrick Aherne. It was based on the 1922 novel Huntingtower by John Buchan. The film was fairly successful on its release.

== Plot ==
The film is "(a) tale of chivalry in modern times, involving a Glasgow grocer and a Russian princess imprisoned in a deserted castle" according to the British Film Institute.

== Cast ==
- Harry Lauder as Dickson McCunn
- Vera Voronina as Princess Saskia
- Patrick Aherne as Capt. John Heritage
- Lillian Christine as Mrs. McCunn
- John Manners as Prince Paul
- Moore Marriott as Speidel
- Douglas Herald as Leon
- Susanne Morris as Mother
- W. Cronin Wilson as Dobson
- Nancy Price as Mrs.Moran
- Jerrold Robertshaw as Father
- Harry Malonie as Dougal

== Production ==
The castle scenes were shot at Bamburgh Castle.

== Bibliography ==
- Low, Rachel. The History of British Film: Volume IV, 1918–1929. Routledge, 1997.
