= The Path of the King =

1921 novel by John Buchan

- Author: John Buchan
- Language: English
- Genre: Novel
- Set in: Various countries
- Publisher: Hodder & Stoughton
- Publication date: 1921
- Media type: Print
- Pages: 310

The Path of the King is a 1921 novel by the Scottish author John Buchan, presented as a loosely-coupled series of short stories.

== Prologue ==
In a prologue to the novel, three men discuss around a campfire the notion that the 'spark' of masterful men may be transmitted down from generation to generation, and even though it may smoulder for generations and may seem lost, will reappear and flare up when the time is right.

"I saw the younger sons carry the royal blood far down among the people, down even into the kennels of the outcast. Generations follow, oblivious of the high beginnings, but there is that in the stock which is fated to endure. The sons and daughters blunder and sin and perish, but the race goes on, for there is a fierce stuff of life in it. ... Some rags of greatness always cling to it, the dumb faith that sometime and somehow that blood drawn from kings it never knew will be royal again. Though nature is wasteful of material things, there is no waste of spirit. And then after long years there comes, unheralded and unlooked for, the day of the Appointed Time".

== Plot ==
The novel takes the form of a loosely-coupled collection of short stories presenting a sweeping tapestry of historical episodes, from the Vikings through centuries of Norman, French, Flemish, English, Scottish and American scenes.

In the first episode, a Northern prince's golden torque is the symbol of his royal status. On his death the gold is remodelled as a ring, which is handed down from generation to generation until it is eventually inherited by the mother of Abraham Lincoln. The young Abe, using it as a sinker for his fishing line, loses it in a crick and is distraught. On her deathbed, Abe's mother recognises the potential for kingliness in her young son and dies content, realising that the ring is needed no more.

In an epilogue to the novel, set many years later, three men stand watching the funeral cortège after Lincoln's death. "There goes the first American" says one. The young British attaché replies, "I dare say you are right, Professor, but I think it is also the last of the Kings."

== Critical reception ==
Although a favourite of GM Trevelyan, other early critics of the book were less enthusiastic. The Times Literary Supplement considered the work "disappointing", and criticised it for its "pseudo-romantic vocabulary" and "the use of slightly pretentious and unusual words and locutions where common and more vigorous ones would serve better".

In The Interpreter's House (1975), David Daniell noted that The Path of the King marked the beginning of Buchan's historical writing. He considered the 'feel' of the many atmospheres to be well done, and the narratives to be 'fresh and good'.

In his 2009 essay John Buchan, America and the ‘British World’, 1904-40 Peter Henshaw suggested that Buchan had the implicit purpose of fostering Anglo-American unity, and that his aim in writing the novel was to build up Lincoln as a shared hero of the British and American people. He took the epilogue as being a restatement of the view that Lincoln's highest achievement was his defence of the American Union, "a grand geopolitical association comparable in Buchan's mind to the British Empire".

Writing for the John Buchan Society website, JCG Greig suggested that the fascination of this book grows on the reader gradually, and that in order to grasp the consistency of the tale little clues have to be looked for constantly. Buchan presents Lincoln's Presidency in the American Civil War as nothing less than kingly. The choice of Lincoln, the product of ordinary parents, proclaims that kingliness does not depend upon outward trappings but on inward riches. Greig considered it a book "especially for the historically minded to dwell on and even drool over".
