= The Free Fishers =

1934 novel by John Buchan

- 1934 first edition
- Author: John Buchan
- Language: English
- Genre: Novel
- Set in: England
- Publisher: Hodder & Stoughton
- Publication date: 1934
- Media type: Print
- Pages: 320

The Free Fishers is a 1934 novel by the Scottish author John Buchan, his last work of historical fiction. The novel is set during the period of the Napoleonic Wars and follows the adventures of Anthony Lammas, a young professor at St Andrews who is drawn into a plot to kill the prime minister Spencer Perceval. He is aided by The Free Fishers, a secret mutual aid organisation.

== Plot ==
Anthony ("Nanty") Lammas, a young professor at St Andrews, is sent by his college to London to plead for funds from Lord Snowdoun, Secretary of State for Scotland. He visits Snowdoun's chief advisor, Lord Mannour, who tells him that his true task will be to save his former pupil and Snowdoun's son Harry, Lord Belses, from the wrath of Sir Turnour Wyse, a noted shot who has challenged him to a duel. Nanty also needs to dissuade Harry from his connection with Mrs Gabriel Cranmer, a lady believed to harbour dangerous Jacobin views. Harry has been lined up to marry Mannour's ward, the wealthy young landowner Christian ("Kirsty") Evandale. Mannour's son Jock Kinloch is infatuated with Kirsty, though Mannour makes it clear that he will have to stand aside.

But a yet more serious task soon falls to Nanty. Having grown up among the fishermen of Fife, Nanty is a member of The Free Fishers, a secret mutual aid organisation which has been tasked by His Majesty with tackling Mrs Cranmer's treasonous spying activities. She is believed to be using her innocent husband Justin Cranmer as cover.

Nanty heads South to Hungrygrain, Cranmer's isolated house on the Northumberland moors, in the company of his fellow Free Fisher Jock and the Chief Fisher Eben Garnock. On the road they meet Duncan Dott, a town clerk who is coincidentally seeking an interview with Mrs Cranmer to get her signature in connection with a minor legal matter.

Harry, whose whereabouts are unknown to the others, makes his own way to Hungrygrain where he is attacked and imprisoned by Cranmer's men. Mrs Cranmer escapes to the hills to seek help for Harry, and runs into Nanty who is prospecting the area. She confides that her husband's treasonous activities are coming to a head: he is plotting to murder her cousin, the prime minister Spencer Perceval, and to pin the blame on her. Nanty is unable to persuade her to flee; explaining that her own fate is already sealed she returns to the house.

An injured Harry escapes to a nearby manse where he meets Nanty and his group, and also Sir Turnour who has been searching for him to force the duel. After hearing Nanty's news, the men agree to put their quarrel temporarily aside and join forces. They head for Hungrygrain only to find that Cranmer and his wife have left. The house is almost empty, but in a back room they find Duncan Dott, locked in after being too persistent in demanding an interview with Mrs Cranmer. He reports that before she and her husband left her servant had slipped him a piece of paper bearing the words "Merry Mouth".

The group follow the fugitives to Mrs Cranmer's estate at Overy Hall in Norfolk. They again just miss them, but discover documents that Cranmer has fabricated in order to frame his wife for the intended murder.

They learn that "Merry Mouth" is the name of an inn, and that the Prime Minister has been lured there by a fake message from his cousin. He is already on his way, but is warned off by Kirsty and her aunt Miss Georgie who are staying nearby and who have been tipped off by Nanty. Nanty enters the apparently abandoned inn and manages to find Mrs Cranmer, but is captured and bound by her husband. Just as he is about to be shot by Cranmer the others arrive, and Cranmer is himself is shot dead by Sir Turnour.

Harry and Sir Turnour settle their differences, Jock wins Kirsty, Harry wins Mrs Cranmer, and Dott at last gets the business signature he needs. The Prime Minister promises that the St Andrews funding issue will be settled, and Nanty returns contentedly to his studies.

== Principal characters ==
- Anthony ("Nanty") Lammas, professor at St Andrews University and Free Fisher
- Lord Snowdoun, his patron and Secretary of State for Scotland
- Harry, Lord Belses, Snowdoun's son
- Lord Mannour (Peter Kinloch), lawyer and chief advisor to Lord Snowdoun
- Jock Kinloch, Mannour's son and Free Fisher
- Sir Turnour Wyse, baronet, of Wood Rising in Norfolk
- Christian ("Kirsty") Evandale, wealthy young mistress of Balbarnit in Fife, under the trusteeship of Lord Mannour
- Miss Georgie, her aunt
- Justin Cranmer, owner of Hungrygrain in Northumberland
- Mrs Gabriel Cranmer (née Gabriel Cornelia Lucy Perceval), young wife of Cranmer and owner of Overy Hall in Norfolk
- Spencer Perceval, Prime Minister and cousin of Mrs Gabriel Cranmer
- Duncan Dott, town clerk in the small Scottish burgh of Waucht
- Eben Garnock, Chief Fisher

== Critical reception ==
David Daniell, in The Interpreter's House (1975), stated that the novel is as fresh and engaging as Witch Wood is dark and suffocating. He considered that the exuberance of action does not swamp the plotting, and there are some fine assured touches. The technical details of high-speed pre-railway coaching are displayed with an easy mastery.

Buchan's biographer Andrew Lownie, writing in 2013, noted that the novel has never been one of Buchan's most popular as it lacks the complexities of his other historical novels and the narrative pace of his "shockers". He considered it nevertheless to have a charm of its own.
