= Salute to Adventurers =

1915 novel by John Buchan

- First edition
- Author: John Buchan
- Language: English
- Genre: Novel
- Publisher: T Nelson & Sons
- Publication date: 1915
- Media type: Print
- Pages: 397

Salute to Adventurers is a 1915 historical adventure novel by the Scottish author John Buchan. Largely set among the newly-settled Virginia plantations of the late 17th century, the novel includes a number of historical characters and events, including the wild and radical preaching of John Gibb, founder of the Sweet Singers sect.

== Plot ==
The novel opens in 1685 Scotland, with the 18 year old Andrew Garvald losing his way in the rain and seeking directions at a remote mansion where he hears Elspeth Blair, a girl of about 16, singing a stirring song. Continuing his journey across the moor he stumbles across the Sweet-Singers, a group of religious fanatics led by the zealot Muckle John Gib. When Elspeth rides up to recover one of her servants who has run away, violence flares and both Garvald and Gib are arrested by a passing troop of dragoons and thrown into Edinburgh’s Canongate Tollbooth. Elspeth secures Garvald’s release, and Muckle John is sentenced to transportation to the American plantations.

Some years later, Garvald sails to Virginia to look after his uncle’s tobacco-trading interests there. Finding fair trade impossible due to the illegal monopolies and violent actions of the English merchants, Garvald seeks the advice of the Governor, Francis Nicholson. Nicholson declares himself powerless to assist, and suggests that Garvald should use the same tactics himself. Garvald warns Nicholson that the white-settled area called the Tidewater is vulnerable to Indian attack, but is unable to persuade him to raise a militia.

Finding he has no option but to take matters into his own hands, Garvald seeks out Ninian Campbell, an adventurer he had first met in Scotland. He finds that Campbell, now known as Red Ringan, is an outlaw and leader of a band called the Free Companions. Ringan offers to help protect Garvald’s trade and, at one with him about the need to protect the Tidewater, co-opts Garvald into his plan to establish a covert militia. There are suggestions that there may be a white leader behind some of the Indian incursions.

Elspeth, now also in Virginia, is pursued by a youth called Charles Grey who is arrogantly offensive to Garvald. The two men fight a duel, with Garvald emerging the victor but sparing Grey’s life. At a dinner at the Governor’s, Nicholson quite unexpectedly announces that having won a large tract of unsettled land to the West in a wager, he intends to give it to Elspeth as a birthday present. He asks that she appoint a 'champion' who will travel to the mountains to retrieve a powder horn buried there in 1672, twenty years before, by an old hunter. Both Garvald and Grey step forward, much to Elspeth’s shame and horror. Garvald recognises that this fool’s errand will serve as cover for a reconnaissance to the Western mountains to check the strength of the Indian tribes and to find out who is leading them. Garvald and Ringan lead the party which includes Grey (his former arrogance now a thing of the past), Shalah, a sympathetic high-born Indian, and three of the local settlers.

As the group reaches the mountains, they narrowly avoid capture by a raiding party of hundreds of Cherokees heading down towards the Tidewater. There, in a very dangerous position, they run into Elspeth who has ill-advisedly ridden West in order to take a look at her birthday land. The party find the hidden horn and present it to Elspeth. Unable to retreat, they build a stockade, and are attacked.

Desperate to get word of the coming invasion back to the Tidewater, Garvald and Ringan leave the stockade and set off on foot. The pair are soon cornered, Ringan killed, and Garvald captured and tortured. Impressed with his courage, Garvald’s captors allow him the chance to save his life in single combat, from which he emerges victorious. When he returns to their camp he finds that Shalah has appeared and has taken charge: as a high-born Indian from a famous tribe he out-ranks all others.

Shalah guides Garvald though the mountains to the headquarters of the main Indian force, where Garvald confronts their charismatic leader – the religious maniac John Gib. He convinces Gib to lead his followers over the mountains, to seek a new home far to the West. Shalah follows, his kingly destiny being eventually to rule the Western peoples. Garvald returns to the Tidewater and marries Elspeth.

== Principal characters ==
- Andrew Garvald, Scottish merchant
- Elspeth Blair, his Scottish/Virginian beau
- Charles Grey, young gentleman
- Muckle John Gib, crazed religious zealot
- Ninian Campbell, also known as Red Ringan, outlaw
- Francis Nicholson, Governor of Virginia
- Shalah, high-born Indian

== Historical background ==
The novel includes an author's introductory note:

The reader is asked to believe that most of the characters in this tale and many of the incidents have good historical warrant. The figure of Muckle John Gib will be familiar to the readers of Patrick Walker.

John Gibb (or Gib) was the founder of the radical Sweet Singers or Gibbite sect, an account of which was set down by the Edinburgh antiquarian Patrick Walker in 1732. Gibb's wild preaching posed a threat to the established Scottish order, and in 1681 he and several of his followers were arrested at their encampment by a troop of dragoons and were imprisoned in the Edinburgh Tollbooth, where Gibb's 'demented howlings and ravings' disturbed the other inmates. Sentenced to transportation to America, he continued to preach even after his period of indentured labour came to an end. His spiritual powers impressed the Native American peoples, and he led them in sacrifices and ritual celebrations.

== Critical reception ==
David Daniell, in The Interpreter's House (1975), said that "Those who love Buchan regard this book with special affection." He considered it to be very fine and written with assurance, with language beautifully modulated to the period.
