= The Watcher by the Threshold, and other tales =

1902 story collection by John Buchan

The Watcher by the Threshold
- First edition 1902
- Author: John Buchan
- Language: English and Scots
- Genre: Collection of novellas and long stories
- Publisher: W Blackwood & Sons
- Publication date: 1902
- Pages: 334

The Watcher by the Threshold, and other tales is a collection of early novellas and stories, most with supernatural elements, by the Scottish author John Buchan. When first published in the UK in 1902 the collection included five stories, mainly set in the Scottish Borders. The collection was republished for the US market in 1918 under the title The Watcher by the Threshold, with four of the original stories and four new ones.

== Plots ==
=== "No Man's Land" ===
The story's narrator is Mr Graves, deputy-professor of Northern Antiquities at Oxford and expert on the Celts, Vikings and Picts. Graves travels to Scotland for a month's fishing holiday, where he stays at a remote shieling with the shepherd Adam and his elderly sister Margit. When several of Adam's lambs are killed he suspects it to be the work of devils that live high in the hills nearby, at the Scarts o' the Muneraw. Graves laughs at the man's superstitions, comparing them with well known folk tales of brownies in the hills. But when he loses his way in the fog while out fishing he discovers that there are indeed creatures living there, small, dark and squat. The creatures bind him and take him to their cave, where Graves discovers that they appear to be a long-lost race who speak an ancient tongue akin to Gaelic. Fascinated by the opportunities for scholarship, Graves attempts to learn all he can, but when he finds out about their murderous ways he knows he must escape. Chased, he arrives back at the shepherd's cottage just as his pursuers are about to catch up with him.

Having been scared witless, Graves returns immediately to Oxford and attempts to forget the incident and concentrate on his academic career. But before long his conscience reminds him that he is missing the greatest discovery of the millennium, and he returns to complete his research. On arrival he finds Adam alone in the cottage and learns that Margit disappeared three weeks earlier.

Graves sends Adam to the local town with a letter seeking assistance, and sets off in a storm for the Scarts o' the Muneraw. Once again, he is captured and taken to the cave, where he finds Margit bound to a stake in the wall. She is to be sacrificed, but as the time nears the storm increases and the roof of the cave slips down the mountain, crushing many of the creatures and allowing the captives to escape. Graves collapses and falls into a swoon.

At this point in the story, a new narrator takes over – a friend of Graves. He reports that Graves's own narration breaks off abruptly, the author having left it unfinished when he died of a heart attack. The friend fills in the final details. After the hostages were rescued by the townspeople, Adam and Margit left the area and Graves returned to Oxford a broken man. Unable to persuade anyone to believe his eye-witness account, he forced himself to return to the hills repeatedly to search for hard evidence to convince his fellow scholars. On his death, The Times laments the rising scholar who had in recent times led a hermit's life and had been "led into fantastic speculations".

=== "The Far Islands" ===
Born on Scotland's North West coast, Colin Raden comes from an ancient family that had always been fascinated by mystical tales of land far out in the Western seas. Several of his forebears, indeed, had sailed West in search of such land, never to be heard of again. As a child, Colin spends hours on the beach staring out to sea and imagining what might be out there. His imaginings start to populate his dreams, but he always finds his view to the West blocked by a dense wall of mist. As he grows up he continues to have dreams, and gradually over the years the mist clears to disclose a far land, initially hardly visible but later becoming more distinct with signs of a sandy beach. He is in a small boat, never able to approach the shore. When Colin finds unexplained words forming themselves in his memory he seeks help from a scholar friend who identifies them as Latin references to an old tale of an Isle of Apple-trees, said to exist far out in the Western ocean where heroes and princes live their second life.

Colin takes a commission in the Guards, and is sent to the desert front. His dreams become more intense, and break through as visions into his waking life. In the midst of the desert's heat and desolation he sees the blue ocean stretching ahead and can smell the apple blossoms. One evening while out on reconnaissance, Colin is shot through the chest by a sniper. Dying, he finds himself back in his small boat, now beaching upon the sand. He leaps out in joy, opening his arms to this new world of youth, rapture and immortality.

=== "The Watcher by the Threshold" ===
Henry, a London barrister, is forced to cut short his shooting holiday in Scotland when he receives a letter from the wife of a schoolfriend, Robert Ladlaw, asking for his urgent help. Arriving at their remote moorland house he finds that Ladlaw believes himself to be haunted by the devil, and is terror-stricken by some formless shadow always close by his left side. Lawlow has changed, too, from being an uncomplicated man of leisure to an esoteric scholar obsessed by Justinian and the ancient philosophers. Unable to bear being left alone for even a moment, he derives some comfort from Henry's companionship; and when Henry is forced to return to London for an urgent consultation he persuades the local minister, Oliphant, to take over from him. The minister manages well enough during the day, but as evening approaches he finds the task intolerable. He escapes across the moor with Ladlaw stumbling after him.

Having taken the night train, Henry arrives back from London early the next morning to learn that a search party has been looking for Ladlaw all night. Eventually Oliphant stumbles on him, sitting in a hollow on the moors. Looking on, Henry sees Ladlaw rising and struggling with Oliphant, though a second glance shows him still sitting quietly and the minister grappling with thin air. Crazed, Oliphant dashes off. Just as he is caught by the search party, the men feel a scorching wind and a cloud moves away over the bog.

Ladlaw returns home, restored, and orders his study cleared of the old philosophy texts he no longer remembers.

=== "The Outgoing of the Tide" ===
The story is said to be from the unpublished notes of the Reverend John Dennistoun, minister in the parish of Caulds on the West coast of Scotland, and author of Satan's Artifices against the Elect.

Alison Sempill, an evil woman reputed to be a witch, lives with her daughter Ailie in a small cottage at Skerburnfoot. Ailie is as godly as her mother is evil, and has committed herself to living by the laws of the kirk. She catches the eye of the young Laird of Heriotside, but their growing love is sabotaged when the devil visits Alison and threatens her with retribution if she allows Ailie to escape him. Working together and convincing each of the young people to doubt the other, the diabolical pair persuade them to agree to a tryst at Sker Bay on the night of Beltane's Eve "between the hours of twelve and one, even at the turning of the tide." The lovers are unaware that anyone in such a place at that time will become bound to the devil forever.

As the day of the tryst approaches, Heriotside's behaviour becomes wilder, and on Beltane's Eve he rides off to the meeting with a face that chills his friends. Although the night is dry, the burns are overflowing and he eventually reaches a furious flood running down the hillside to the sea. Suddenly coming to his senses he sees the devil's works for what they are, and realises that Ailie is being lured to her eternal damnation. Riding like a madman he reaches the shallow waters of the bay soon after midnight, just in time to feel the tide turn. Floating down with the tide he sees the lifeless body of Ailie. Her face shows her to be at peace, and he realises that just as the flood took her she had had the strength to resist her adversary and to fling herself upon God's mercy.

Heriotside long feels the sin of the girl's death, but eventually receives assurance of salvation and becomes a respected pillar of the kirk.

=== "Fountainblue" (1902 collection) ===
Maitland grows up in the remote Black Mount region of Argyll and Bute in Scotland, immersing himself in countryside pursuits and caring little for what he sees as the finer points of civilised society. He spends much time at Fountainblue, his aunt's castle by the coast, walking and sailing. By the time he is forty years old, his drive and ambition have made him a wealthy and powerful man, though not much liked.

When Maitland meets Claire Etheridge at a dinner party in London, he sets out with typical efficiency to woo her. Her family have taken Fountainblue as their Scottish base and Maitland is invited to a house party there. One of the other guests, Jack Despencer, is also attracted to Claire, but Maitland does not notice. Claire is uncertain whether to admire or to despise Maitland.

At Claire's suggestion, Despencer and Maitland join her for a sea trip in the family's small sailing yacht. The wind increases dangerously, and by nightfall it is only Maitland's seamanship and knowledge of the local waters that save them from being dashed onto the rocks. At great risk he helps Claire leap to safety to a small island. Despencer has gone into the water and almost drowns, but with herculean effort Maitland manages to pull him out. Claire's only thought is for Despencer's plight, and Maitland at last realises he has no chance with her. He struggles to a high point on the island and lights a signal beacon. While he waits for help to arrive he experiences an inner crisis, realising that he truly despises the ambitions and successes of his career and the domesticity of civilization.

Shortly after the three are rescued, Maitland – astonishingly to all who know him – gives up his high political ambitions in favour of a lowly governorship in Africa. After his lonely death on the frontier some years later, colleagues speculate on his reasons. One thought it was Claire's refusal that sent him abroad. But another understood that his love for her was more akin to an accident within his austere spirit, and that some self-revelation had shown Maitland that his true destiny lay far from indoor civilization.

=== "The Rime of True Thomas" (1918 US collection) ===
One Sunday afternoon a godly Scottish shepherd, taking a walk on the moor to contemplate the long sermon he had heard preached that morning, finds his thoughts interrupted by a large flock of whaups. Angrily shouting at them, he is accosted by a bird calling itself a Respectable Whaup that wants to know why he has broken up a family gathering that takes place once every hundred years. The bird berates the shepherd for knowing nothing about his own family and history, and tells of people and events going back to its own great-grandmother's time, more than a thousand years earlier. The shepherd forgets the sermon and asks to hear more, but the bird says that such things cannot be explained to one who has not first heard the music of True Thomas's Rime, the beginning and end of all things. When the shepherd hears the music he feels a deep dissatisfaction. He abandons the kirk and, like other men who had heard the music before him, leaves his homeland to seek his fortune.

=== "Basilissa" (1918 US collection) ===
All his life Vernon has experienced an annual nightmare in which he dreams of finding himself in an old panelled chamber. A closed door faces him, and he knows that beyond that is another identical room, and another, and so on interminably. In one of the series of rooms some horror is gradually moving towards him, one room closer each year. Year by year Vernon begins to prepare himself.

As Vernon grows, his grandmother's Greek blood comes to the fore, and colleagues remark on his appearance of Greek divinity.

When he is in his early twenties, Vernon takes a sailing holiday to the Greek islands. On the edge of a small bay he sees a great white house, the residence of Basilissa, reputed witch and Queen of Hell, sometimes called Prosperine. That night the dream comes to Vernon again, and while he dreams a small boat moors alongside the yacht and a messenger tells him there is work to be done. The expected call has come and Vernon is ready. He is rowed to the shore, where a maid explains that her mistress Basilissa is no witch but a gracious young woman whose family has long been hated by the local people. A mob has gathered and intends to burn the house to the ground. The women in the house have been offered sanctuary by a notorious local leader, Vlastos, who demands in return that Basilissa gives herself to him.

Vernon is ushered into a large room, the very chamber that is familiar from his dreams. A young woman enters, runs to him and, addressing him as Perseus, exclaims that she knew he would come. Calling her Andromeda, he replies that they will leave together but that first he has to talk to the Monster. Vlastos enters through the door he knows so well, and the two men fight. Vernon prevails and the lovers escape.

In a small boat, far out at sea, Vernon says that he has been looking for her for twenty years. She replies that she has been waiting since the beginning of the world.

=== "Divus Johnston" (1918 US collection) ===
Peter Thompson, a Glaswegian ship's captain, is wrecked on a small island in the South China Sea. Captured by the local people he is anointed, dressed in a white gown and taken to their temple, apparently to serve as a human sacrifice. But there he finds a man who serves as the locals' god: Johnston, a fellow Glaswegian who had been wrecked on the island years earlier. Having directed that the locals build him a boat, Johnston is ready to leave. The two men make their way back to their native land, where years later Johnston stands for parliament as the Liberal candidate. He warns Thompson to keep quiet about their past, as the Party of Progress could hardly have confidence in a man who had once been a god.

=== "The King of Ypres" (1918 US collection) ===
During the Great War Peter Galbraith, a private in the 3rd Lennox Highlanders, is temporarily billeted in Ypres. Unable to sleep due to the noise, he creeps down into the basement. When he wakes the next morning, his regiment has departed leaving him behind. In the street he finds a young woman, Mam'selle Omèrine, struggling with two thugs, one of whom he summarily dispatches with his bayonet. Realising that the town is a hive of lawless activity, Galbraith decides that it is up to him to keep the peace. Enlisting the help of some locals, he sets up a Committee of Public Safety and within a few days has imposed an unprecedented level of control. Mam'selle Omèrine playfully calls him "Monsieur le Roi d'Ypres".

When Mam'selle Omèrine is killed by a German shell, Galbraith decides that his duty is to get back to the front line, and that he must resign his post. But before he can do so, British troops return to the town. Galbraith is arrested as a deserter and is court martialled. The local people speak up for him, and although he is convicted the court imposes no penalty.

Galbraith returns to the trenches. When a fellow soldier tells him that they are facing enemy lines of maybe fifty thousand men, Galbraith is content. He considers that the whole fifty thousand can scarcely atone for Mam'selle Omèrine's death.

== Title ==
The book's epigraph is a quotation said to be an "Extract from the writings of Donisarius of Padua, circa 1310." It contrasts active travellers who "tarry in the outer courts, speeding the days joyfully with dance and song" with those who remain near to home and who "are found watching by the threshold" night and day, "ever anxious and ill at ease that they may see something of the Shadows which come and go."

== Publication ==
The collection was first published in 1902 by W Blackwood & Sons, and included the stories "No Man's Land", "The Far Islands", "The Watcher by the Threshold", "The Outgoing of the Tide" and "Fountainblue". Four of the stories had been published in Blackwood's Magazine between January 1899 and August 1901, and one ("The Outgoing of the Tide") in The Atlantic Monthly in January 1902. When it was published by George H. Doran in the US in 1918, "Fountainblue" was omitted, and four additional stories were added: "The Rime of True Thomas", "Basilissa", "Divus Johnston" and "The King of Ypres".

== Critical reception ==
On the collection's first publication, The Bookman wrote that Buchan's intention is not a cheerful one for it is the "back-world of Scotland" that he describes, a land of old terrors, ancient cruelties and inhuman paganism. The reviewer thought it a book to shudder over, but one through which runs veins of real beauty.

Writing in 1975, David Daniell said that the collection contains much material that Buchan will later return to in greater depth: "The Outgoing of the Tide" points to Witch Wood, and "The Watcher by the Threshold" and "No Man's Land" point to The Dancing Floor. An episode from "Basilissa" was re-used by Buchan in The Dancing Floor.

"No Man's Land" Daniell considered to be a fascinating novella in which the author develops the sense of desolate threat felt in the remote Scottish hills, using the idea of the survival of a group of Picts as one more illustration of the ancient texture of the landscape. The novella predatesThe Lost World (1912) and Daniell considered it to surpass Conan Doyle and even H. G. Wells in its analysis of the hero's psychology.

Buchan's biographer Andrew Lownie referenced the development in "Fountainblue" of several of Buchan's themes: the power of a place extending over a long period, the thin line of civilization, and the existence within individuals of hidden depths of character.

== Bibliography ==
- Daniell, David (1975). The Interpreter's House. London: Nelson. ISBN 0-17-146051-0.
- Lownie, Andrew (2013). John Buchan: The Presbyterian Cavalier. London: Thistle Publishing. ISBN 978-1-909609-99-0.
