= Castle Gay =

1930 novel by John Buchan

- First edition (UK)
- Author: John Buchan
- Language: English
- Series: Dickson McCunn
- Genre: Thriller
- Set in: Scotland
- Publisher: Hodder & Stoughton (UK); Houghton Mifflin (US)
- Publication date: 1930
- Media type: Print
- Pages: 320
- Preceded by: Huntingtower
- Followed by: The House of the Four Winds

Castle Gay is a 1930 novel by the Scottish author John Buchan. It is the second of his three Dickson McCunn novels and is set in the Scottish district of Carrick, Galloway some six years after the events described in Huntingtower.

== Plot ==
Dickson McCunn, a 60-year old retired grocery-store owner hosts a supper for two of his protégés: John 'Jaikie' Galt and Dougal Crombie. Jaikie is now an undergraduate at Cambridge University and a rugby international; Douglas is a journalist working for the Craw Press. The two are to take a walking holiday in the Canonry, in the district of Carrick.

Thomas Carlyle Craw, proprietor of the Craw Press, is an influential writer with a special interest in the central European state of Evallonia, supporting restoration of the monarchy after years of republican rule. He is an extreme recluse, and has leased the secluded Castle Gay from its Scottish owner Lord Rhynns.

Craw is abducted by students during a prank in which he is mistaken for another man, and is held at the very cottage where Jaikie and Dougal intend to stay. They agree to carry a letter to Craw's secretary at Castle Gay, Frederick Barbon, who can make sure that he remains hidden from the crowds of journalists who have arrived to cover an important local by-election. The friends find the gates to the Castle grounds barred, and they stumble across a journalist for a rival paper, Albert Tibbets, who is covering the story of Craw’s disappearance. They meet Alison Westwater, daughter of Lord Rhynns; Jaikie admires her. With Alison's help they gain access only to be told by Barbon that Craw must stay away as there is a party of Evallonian monarchists who are desperate to talk to him: Prince Odalchini, Count Casimir Muresco and Professor Jagon. They want Craw to ensure that the British government will support the overthrow of the Evallonian republicans and the ascent of their candidate Prince John to a restored throne. Unable to make them understand that Craw has no power to do any such thing, Dougal brings Dickson McCunn over to talk "practical common sense". Jaikie takes Craw on a walking tour, to ensure he remains hidden.

Tibbets is convinced he has a scoop when he is admitted to the castle and gains an interview with Craw - without realising that his interviewee is in fact McCunn. He publishes his article the next day, "Mr Craw Speaks to the World", in which he has Craw repudiating all his long-held principles.

Jaikie searches for Sigsimund Allins, a rogue employee of Craw’s who has accepted a payment from the monarchists for an introduction to Craw, and a larger one from the republicans who hope to create a scandal by catching the monarchists colluding with a magnate of the British press. Jaike pretends to be drunk and 'accidentally' lets slip that the day of the by-election would be a good opportunity to catch Craw conspiring in Castle Gay, as most of the castle staff will be absent.

The monarchists, now joined by Prince John himself, are horrified to hear that their enemies are at hand, and especially by the presence of the communist leader Anton Mastrovin. They leave immediately for London. Prince John is helped by McCunn - who has developed strong personal loyalties - to escape by boat. As the prince departs, he gives McCunn a ring and McCunn vows that "if ever you have need of me, a word will bring me across the world".

Mastrovin and his men arrive at the castle and demand to see Craw. They expect to find him plotting with the prince and monarchists but instead find him in his study innocently dictating letters. They pull out guns, but are disconcerted when McCunn walks in, in his matter-of-fact way, followed by the local policeman. McCunn offers to allow them to leave - without their guns - or else face a charge of hamesucken. They comply.

Jaikie and Alison reluctantly part, but not before he has vowed "to meet again … often … always" and she has called him "Dear Jaikie". He realises that he has found something precious, and that he is no longer alone.

== Principal characters ==
=== Locals ===
- Dickson McCunn, wealthy retired 60-year-old Glasgow grocer
- Dougal Crombie, journalist with the Craw Press
- John 'Jaikie' Galt, Cambridge undergraduate and rugby international
- Alison Westwater, daughter of Castle Gay’s owner Lord Rhynns
- Thomas Carlyle Craw, proprietor of the Craw Press
- Frederick Barbon, Craw’s secretary
- Sigsimund Allins, rogue employee of Craw
- Albert Tibetts, rival journalist.

=== Evallonians ===
- Prince John, pretender to the throne of Evallonia
- Prince Odalchini, leader of the monarchists
- Count Casimir Muresco, monarchist
- Professor Jagon, monarchist
- Anton Mastrovin, communist and leader of the republicans.

== Critical reception ==
In The Interpreter's House (1975), David Daniell noted that the novel contains striking images and scenes, even though this and the other romance dealing with the politics of Evallonia (The House of the Four Winds) did not represent Buchan at his best.
