= Montrose (book) =

1928 biography by John Buchan

- First edition 1928
- Author: John Buchan
- Genre: Biography; history
- Publisher: Thomas Nelson and Sons Ltd
- Publication date: 1928
- Media type: Print
- Pages: 419

Montrose (Montrose: a history in the US) is a 1928 biography of James Graham, 1st Marquess of Montrose by the Scottish author John Buchan. It won the James Tait Black Memorial Prize for biography in 1928.

== Background ==
From his undergraduate days at Oxford, Buchan had always had a fascination with Montrose, and came to feel that earlier historians had not done him justice. In 1913, Buchan’s publishers T Nelson released his first attempt at a biography, The Marquis of Montrose, which was dedicated to his brother Willie who had died a year earlier. The earlier book did not receive universal acclaim, and his old antagonist D. Hay Fleming took the opportunity to attack the author for giving insufficient credit to Argyll. Buchan’s enthusiasm for his subject had laid him open to the charge of romancing, and Buchan later admitted that many of the judgements that he had made in the work were “exaggerated and hasty”.

Over the next fifteen years he collected material for a more historically-expansive work, adding to previous scholarship with a study of the pamphlet literature of the time, and in 1928 T Nelson published the scholarly Montrose. A US printing by Houghton Mifflin also appeared, under the title Montrose: A History.

The historical research that Buchan had been doing for Montrose underpinned further works. In 1930 he gave a lecture at St Andrews on Montrose and Leadership, which was published separately. But most important to Buchan was its influence on his historical novel Witch Wood (1927), within which Montrose appears as a minor character.

== Content ==
Montrose is a detailed account of the life of James Graham, 1st Marquess of Montrose who sought to combine adherence to Scotland's 1638 National Covenant with loyalty to Charles I. As Charles's lieutenant-general in Scotland, Montrose was, argues Buchan, a skilful general during a series of Highland and Lowland battles in 1645-46, but who was ultimately thwarted later in 1646 by the disaster of Philiphaugh. Buchan then goes on to consider the aftermath, Montrose’s new campaign in the North for Charles II after his father’s execution in 1649, and his own defeat, betrayal, trial, and execution.

== Critical reception ==
As a scholarly edition, Montrose was widely praised. The biography is, said one later critic, presented with a reverent, dignified but not exaggerated dramatic power; while another praised Buchan’s research while expressing some regret at the loss of “good sharp phrases” from his earlier work.

A. L. Rowse considered the book to be a masterly historical biography, Buchan’s chief contribution to historical research, written wholly from original sources.
