= A Lodge in the Wilderness =

1906 quasi-novel by John Buchan

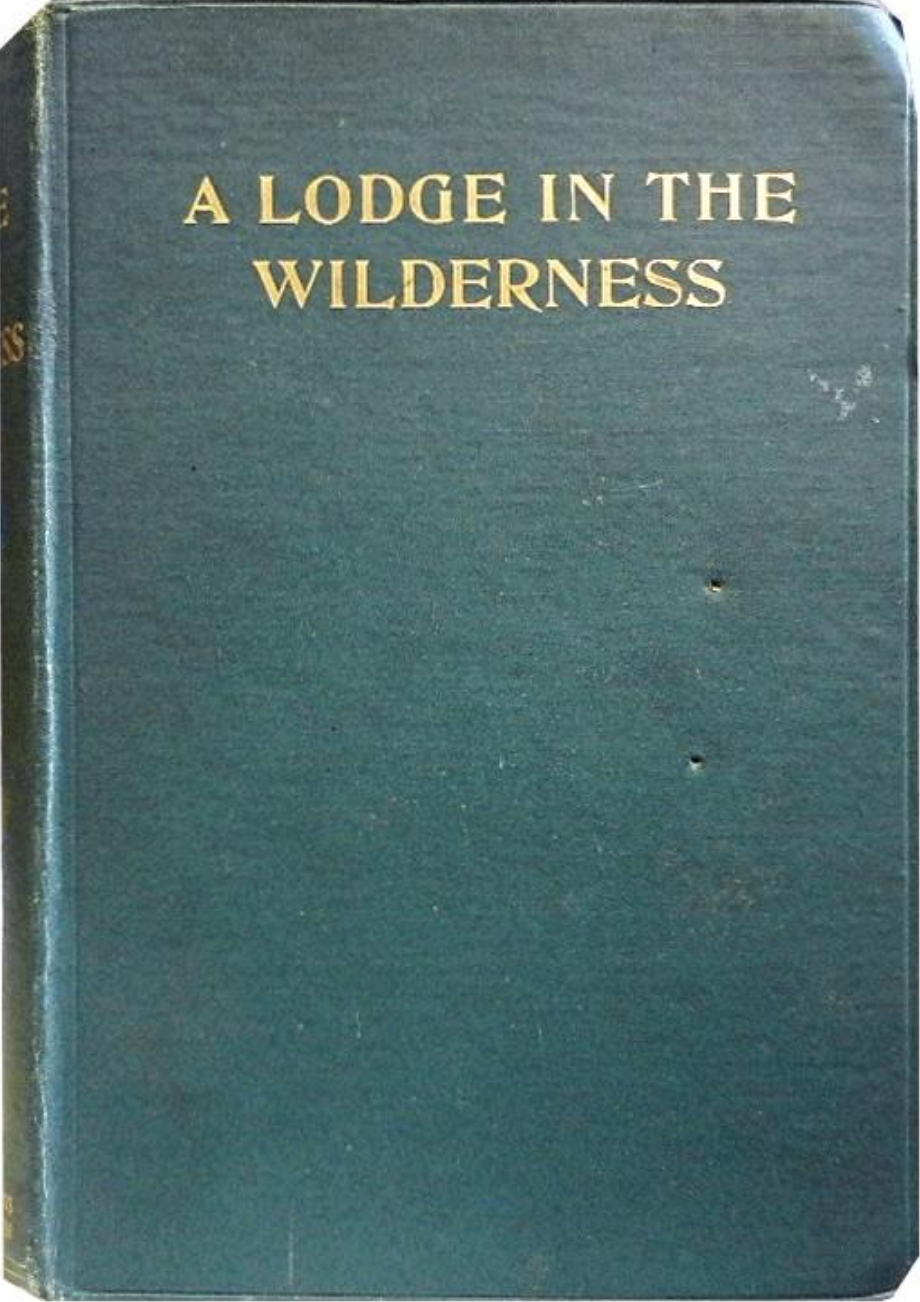
- 1st edition cover
- Author: John Buchan
- Language: English
- Genre: Quasi-novel
- Publisher: William Blackwood & Sons
- Publication date: 1906
- Media type: Print
- Pages: 378

A Lodge in the Wilderness is a 1906 political quasi-novel by the Scottish author John Buchan.

== Plot ==
The book relates an imagined conference arranged by a multi-millionaire, Francis Carey, to discuss Empire. The guests are contemporary figures from the upper and professional classes, nine men and nine women, all of whom have an interest in understanding how Empire might be a positive influence. Buchan uses the novel to expound a variety of current political and social viewpoints.

== Critical reception ==
David Daniell, in The Interpreter's House (1975), called the work "an extraordinary book, like nothing else". It is mostly serious discussion, but there is also a lot of fun especially in the portrait of Lady Flora Brume, based upon the real-life Susan Grosvenor who was later to become Buchan's wife.

Writing for The John Buchan Society website in 2002, Edwin Lee noted that while the book has some aspects of a novel it is not a novel in the ordinary sense of the word. Rather, he suggested, Buchan is using the imagined conference, via the utterances of his characters, as a means of defending the ideals and practical benefits of Empire.

In his 2009 essay John Buchan and the South African War Michael Redley noted that the book drew on Buchan's South African experiences. The author's intention "was to rescue [Lord] Milner's best ideas from the wreckage of his South African policy when British politics lurched to the left in January 1906".

Andrew Lownie, in his 2013 biography John Buchan: The Presbyterian Cavalier, suggested that while the attitudes appearing in the book may appear patronising to a late 20th-century reader, Buchan “shows himself to be far in advance of many of his contemporaries with his view of the empowerment of the individual and the Empire as a liberalising force for good”.
