= A Lost Lady of Old Years =

1899 novel by John Buchan

- First edition
- Author: John Buchan
- Language: English
- Genre: Novel
- Publisher: John Lane
- Publication date: 1899
- Media type: Print
- Pages: 366

A Lost Lady of Old Years is an 1899 novel by the Scottish author John Buchan. It was first published in serial form in Today. The title comes from Browning’s poem Waring.

== Plot ==
The novel is a study of the romantic temperament and of conflicts of loyalty, set in Scotland during the Jacobite rising of 1745.

The story follows the adventures of Francis Birkenshaw, the eldest child of a laird of the Cheviots' younger son, who, having been disowned, drank himself into an early, impoverished grave. Francis grows up tough in Edinburgh, until at 18 he becomes a law apprentice in the 1740s, the time of the Jacobite rising. He is also a drinker and given to rash actions, which require him to make a new life elsewhere. On a boat out he meets another young man making an enforced departure from Scotland, Peter Stark, and they embark on adventure together. They are forced to land and to trek across Scotland, but part company before long. In Broughton, he is enticed by Dod Craik into jointly robbing a large house of money intended for the Jacobite rebellion. He is discovered, but mistaken for a rebel messenger by the lady of the house, Mrs Margaret Murray, and is sent with a letter to Edinburgh. He resolves to hand it over to the King's men instead, but is thwarted when he encounters the lady again on the way. He reaches Edinburgh, repents, and through Mrs Murray joins the rebel cause.

Francis's first assignment is to carry a message north to Lord Lovat, then another from him back to the Murrays. Straying off the road to Edinburgh he is injured in an accident, rescued from near death by crofters and nursed back to health over several weeks. He catches up with 'Bonnie' Prince Charlie's entourage at Culloden, delivers the letter, and observes the battle. Fleeing the aftermath of the rout, he encounters Lovat and feels obliged to help him extricate himself from his situation, by finding Murray and destroying the incriminating letter from Lovat that he had delivered.

He follows Murray south through the west of Scotland, reaching Broughton, where he meets Mrs Murray again. He vows to accompany her to London to see her now captive husband. In Warwickshire he briefly encounters Stark. He manages to be allowed to visit Murray in the Tower. His offer to spring Murray is declined, and he suspects Murray of planning treachery. Lovat is put on trial, and Murray indeed testifies against him, resulting in a death sentence for Lovat. Francis attends the public execution. After declaring their love for each other, he parts ways with Mrs Murray, who decides to enter a convent in France, and he returns to Edinburgh to restart his career as a writer to the signet, which culminates in becoming Provost, though he never marries.

== Critical reception ==
David Daniell, in The Interpreter's House (1975), called the novel "the story of romantic defeat, a gallant fanaticism that ended in dull retreat instead of ringing death. There is a nice decorum in the control of the material all through...". He considered that Buchan has been able to "get the darker shades moving in and out of his hero with some success".

Andrew Lownie, in John Buchan: The Presbyterian Cavalier (2013) stated that this is a more ambitious and complex book than Buchan had previously attempted, and that perhaps as a result is less successful. He considered it to have been a victim of its long and spasmodic gestation, and of Buchan's busy lifestyle.
