= The Moon Endureth =

1912 short story collection by John Buchan

- First edition 1912
- Author: John Buchan
- Language: English
- Genre: Short story and poetry collection
- Set in: Various
- Publisher: W Blackwood & Sons
- Publication date: 1912
- Media type: Print
- Pages: 324

The Moon Endureth, subtitled 'Tales and Fancies', is a 1912 short story and poetry collection by the Scottish author John Buchan.

== Title ==
In an introduction to the collection Buchan quotes from an article on St Francis in Lives of the Saints: "To the righteous is promised abundance of peace while the moon endureth". Psalms 72:7 in the King James Version has "In his days shall the righteous flourish; and abundance of peace so long as the moon endureth".

== Content ==
The collection includes the following short stories and poems. The stories Streams of Water in the South and The Rime of True Thomas were reprinted from a former collection, Grey Weather. The remaining tales had all previously appeared in Blackwood's Magazine.

- From the Pentlands Looking North and South (poem)
- I. The Company of the Marjolaine (short story)
  - "Avignon" (poem)
- II. A Lucid Interval (short story)
  - "The Shorter Catechism" (poem)
- III. The Lemnian (short story)
  - "Atta's Song" (poem)
- IV. Space (short story)
  - "Stocks and Stones" (poem)
- V. Streams of Water in the South (short story)
  - "The Gipsy's Song to the Lady Cassilis" (poem)
- VI. The Grove of Ashtaroth (short story)
  - "Wood Magic" (poem)
- VII. The Riding of Ninemileburn (short story)
  - "Plain Folk" (poem)
- VIII. The Kings of Orion (short story)
  - "Babylon" (poem)
- IX. The Green Glen (short story)
  - "The Wise Years" (poem)
- X. The Rime of True Thomas (short story)

== Critical reception ==
In its review of the first edition The Athenaeum noted "a marked leaning towards the mysterious and bizarre". The collection was said to show "considerable imagination, and occasionally a touch of delicate satire".
