= John Burnet of Barns =

1898 novel by John Buchan

- Author: John Buchan
- Language: English
- Genre: Historical novel
- Set in: Scotland
- Published: London & New York
- Publisher: John Lane
- Publication date: 1898
- Media type: Print
- Pages: 444

John Burnet of Barns is an 1898 novel by the Scottish author John Buchan, published when he was 23 years of age. His second novel, it had first appeared in serial form in Chambers's Journal earlier that year.

== Introduction ==
The novel follows the adventures of John Burnet (a fictional relative of the 17th-century cleric and historian Gilbert Burnet), supposed to have been born at Barns in Tweeddale, Scotland in 1666. It is written as an autobiography, with the eponymous writer detailing the events of his life as a first-person narrative.

== Plot ==
The novel opens in 1678, with the bookish 12-year-old John Burnet escaping from his tutor at Barns for a day's fishing expedition. In the woods he meets Marjory Veitch, about 10 years old, the daughter of a neighbour. The two become playmates and, over the years, sweethearts.

Following the recommendation of his illustrious uncle Gilbert Burnet of Edinburgh, John is at the age of 18 sent to study at Glasgow University, where he proves to be an exceptional scholar. One day, he sees in the street his soldier cousin Gilbert Burnet, dressed in the latest fashions, riding arrogantly through the town at the head of a king's troop of horse. John resolves there and then to give up the life of a scholar, and to honour his family line by becoming a Cavalier himself. He buys himself a blade and a new suit of clothes, and returns home to Barns where he is welcomed with surprise by his father who is entertaining a guest – his cousin Gilbert. Gilbert insults John and offhandedly makes clear his intention to court Marjory. He challenges John to a long and dangerous race on horseback through the surrounding hills, a race that John ultimately wins, though at the cost of Gilbert's lifelong enmity.

John asks Marjory to marry him, and shortly afterwards becomes the new laird of Barns on the sudden death of his father. He decides that he should spend some time travelling abroad before returning to marry Marjory and take up his new role at home. Becoming interested once more in scholarship, he travels to the Netherlands to study at the university in Leyden, where he again encounters his cousin. During a supper party, Gilbert taunts John, who responds by hurling a wine glass. The cousins fight a duel, with John emerging victorious. Gilbert departs for Scotland.

Some months later, John receives a mysterious letter from Marjory summoning him home urgently. On his arrival in Scotland, John finds that Gilbert has falsely denounced him as a traitor and that his lands have been confiscated. He is hunted around the Borders by Gilbert's soldiers. Fearing for Marjory's safety, he covertly escorts her to shelter with a kinsman, while he takes to the hills as an outlaw. Gilbert finds Marjory and tricks her into accompanying him to his estate in the west of Scotland. John follows, helps her escape, then confronts Gilbert. They are engaged in a final swordfight, and Gilbert is mortally wounded by a shot from one of his own disgruntled men.

King James having been deposed by William of Orange while John was on the run, he is now free to travel to London to recover his lands. That complete, he returns to Barns and marries Marjory.

== Principal characters ==
- John Burnet: of the House of Barns, Tweeddale
- Majory Veitch: his neighbour and childhood sweetheart
- William Burnet: John's elderly father, laird of Barns
- Gilbert Burnet: William's brother and John's uncle, later Bishop of Salisbury
- Gilbert Burnet: Gilbert's son and John's cousin, a soldier for King James
- Nicol Plenderleith: John's servant.

== Critical reception ==
Buchan was not entirely satisfied with the novel, and wrote to a friend, "To tell the truth I am rather ashamed of it; it is so very immature and boyish. I had no half serious interest in fiction when I wrote it and the result is a sort of hotch-potch". Early reviews were mixed, but confirmed that Buchan was a writer to watch. The Labour Leader opined that it was "a most remarkable work for so young a man".

David Daniell in The Interpreter's House (1975) stated that, in spite of Buchan's faults of inexperience, this is a fine book for a first long novel. He considered it to be a fascinating 'hotch-potch' in which Buchan, with evidence of a lot of thought, reworked big themes. Daniell concluded that the book is "a clever, searching analysis of non-commitment done with a good deal of novelistic skill, at the fringes of a more frightening darkness."

== Bibliography ==
- Daniell, David (1975). The Interpreter's House. London: Nelson. ISBN 0-17-146051-0.
- Lownie, Andrew (2013). John Buchan: The Presbyterian Cavalier. London: Thistle Publishing. ISBN 978-1-909609-99-0.
