= Witch Wood =

1927 novel by John Buchan

- 1st edition dust jacket
- Author: John Buchan
- Language: English, Scots
- Genre: Historical novel
- Set in: Scotland
- Publisher: Hodder and Stoughton (UK); Houghton Mifflin (US)
- Publication date: 1927
- Media type: Print
- Pages: 380

Witch Wood is a 1927 historical novel by the Scottish author John Buchan, set in the Scottish Borders during the 17th-century Wars of the Three Kingdoms. It follows the story of a young Church of Scotland minister, newly-arrived in a rural parish, who is undermined by devil-worshipping parishioners. A substantial part of the dialogue is in Scots.

Buchan wrote the novel while researching Montrose, his biography of James Graham, 1st Marquess of Montrose, who appears as a minor character. Buchan's research had raised questions of seventeenth-century religious tolerance, which he wanted to explore. Drawing on elements of Margaret Murray’s witch-cult hypothesis, the book combines Buchan's wider interests in landscape, 17th century Calvinism, and the history of Scotland. It was the author's favourite novel and has come to be regarded as his masterpiece.

== Plot ==
In a prologue to the novel, the narrator muses on the rural parish of Woodilee in the Scottish Borders. Looking at its now-ruined parish kirk, he recalls a legend about its last minister, who disappeared without trace 300 years ago. Locals believe that he was spirited away by the fairies or, as some maintain, by the devil.

The story opens in 1644 with the coming of David Sempill, newly-ordained minister of the Church of Scotland, to Woodilee, a parish passionate in its support of the Covenant. Sempill is less committed to strict doctrinal practices than many of the Covenanters, and he finds himself attracted to the creed of Mark Kerr, a fugitive and follower of Lord Montrose, supporter of the King and enemy of the Kirk. When Kerr is injured, the minister hides him in the manse.

One night in the feared Black Wood of Melanudrigill the minister stumbles across a diabolic rite in which figures wearing animal headpieces dance around a pagan altar. After attempting unsuccessfully to identify the ringleader, he manages to splash pungent aniseed oil onto the ringleader's clothes. The wife of a prominent elder of the Kirk, Ephraim Caird, is discovered burning clothes on a fire which smells strongly of aniseed.

The plague comes to Woodilee. Sempill works to prevent its spread helped by a newcomer named Mark Riddel who, unknown to the locals, is in fact the fugitive Mark Kerr. Nursing care is surreptitiously provided by a shadowy figure whom the locals take to be a fairy but who is in fact Katrine Yester, niece of the local laird, to whom Sempill is secretly engaged. Katrine contracts the plague and dies. A local woman is accused by a pricker of being a witch and in spite of the best efforts of Sempill and Riddel is tortured and killed.

Sempill presents his evidence of Ephraim Caird's heresy to the presbytery, the Kirk's religious court, which rejects it as circumstantial and unreliable. In retaliation, Caird brings counter-charges against the minister for harbouring a fugitive, for associating with Mark Riddel (now publicly identified as Mark Kerr), and for keeping the company of an unknown woman. Sempill is found guilty and is excommunicated and ejected from his ministry.

On his way back from the hearing, Sempill meets Ephraim Caird near the Black Wood. He forces Caird to enter, kneel before the pagan altar, and to make his choice between Christ and the devil. The effort is too much for Caird who runs off in demented terror and is killed in a fall. The minister is never after that day seen again, giving rise to the legend mentioned in the novel's prologue.

In an epilogue, it is revealed that Sempill and Kerr had ridden to Leith and had boarded the first available ship out of Scotland.

== Background ==
Witch Wood was written while Buchan was researching Montrose, the revised version of his biography of James Graham, 1st Marquess of Montrose, who appears as a minor character in the novel. His research had raised questions of religious tolerance which he wanted to explore. The story was originally known as The Minister of Woodilee and was first serialised in British Weekly under the title The High Places. According to the historian Ronald Hutton, it was based upon the Witch-cult hypothesis of the anthropologist Margaret Murray. The novel combines Buchan's wider interests in landscape, 17th century Calvinism, and the history of Scotland.

== Critical reception ==
Early critics were quick to recognise the significance of the novel, which has since come to be regarded as Buchan's masterpiece. The Spectator called it a "powerful, charming and spiritually earnest novel which almost enables Mr Buchan to be called a modern and terse Walter Scott", and the Glasgow Herald thought that it "must be adjudged the greatest of Mr Buchan's published works. That it concerns the land and history of Scotland, that it makes brilliant use of braid Scots dialect and that it enshrines many aspects, both admirable and contemptible, of the Scottish character are features that must give satisfaction to Mr Buchan's countrymen".

Of the Buchan novels, Witch Wood was the author's own favourite and has been described as "a masterful tale of godliness in conflict with wickedness." C. S. Lewis wrote, "for Witch Wood specially I am always grateful; all that devilment sprouting up out of a beginning like Galt’s Annals of the Parish. That's the way to do it".

In The Interpreter's House (1975), David Daniell noted that Witch Wood is tightly enclosed, with everything taking place under a heavy, black, suffocating pall of evil. Buchan's writing, Daniell said, "catches the obscene out of the tail of the eye, where it is most effective"; "Projecting his own favourite Scottish place, Broughton, back three centuries when the whole area was under forest, and doing it so convincingly, is a considerable feat. Doing it with such economic realism and keeping up a multiple pressure of plot makes it extraordinary". But Daniell's highest praise was reserved for the way Buchan presents "the ordinary people of the parish, the farmers who so represent the land that they are known by the names of their farms, the few cottagers, the herds and the elders and the children."

== Adaptations ==
The novel was adapted for television twice by the BBC but neither version is known to have survived: in 1954 for Sunday Night Theatre, with Tom Fleming as Sempill; and in 1964 as a four-part series, with Donald Douglas in the role.

The BBC also made an audio version, dramatized by John Scotney and broadcast on BBC Radio 4 in 1990. Sempill was played by Paul Young, while Fleming played a different character, James Fordyce. It was re-broadcast on BBC Radio 4 Extra in 2025.
