= Huntingtower (novel) =

1922 novel by John Buchan

- First edition cover
- Author: John Buchan
- Language: English
- Series: Dickson McCunn
- Genre: Thriller
- Set in: Scotland
- Publisher: Hodder & Stoughton
- Publication date: 1922
- Media type: Print
- Pages: 318
- Followed by: Castle Gay

Huntingtower is a 1922 novel by the Scottish author John Buchan, initially serialised in The Popular Magazine between August 20 and September 7 1921 and in The London Magazine between December 1921 and July 1922. It is the first of his three Dickson McCunn books, the action taking place in the district of Carrick in Galloway, Scotland.

== Plot summary ==
Having sold his Glasgow grocery-store business, 55-year-old Dickson McCunn decides to start his retirement with a walking holiday in the district of Carrick in Galloway. At a local inn he meets John Heritage, a poet and ex-soldier, as well as an unnamed young man who asks after a place called 'Darkwater' that nobody has heard of.

McCunn and Heritage decide to spend the next night at the village of Dalquaharter where they are taken in by a local widow, Phemie Morran. They investigate the local big house, Huntingtower, where – although the place is ostensibly empty – they hear a woman singing. Heritage recognises the voice as that of a Russian princess he had fallen in love with from afar when his battalion had been posted to Rome some years earlier.

On a camping holiday nearby are the Gorbals Die-Hards, a group of street urchins from Glasgow that McCunn had recently supported via a contribution to a charity fund. Their leader, Dougal Crombie, tells them that two women are being kept prisoner. They get into the house and find Saskia, princess of one of the great families of Russia, and her elderly cousin Eugènie. Saskia explains that she is a fugitive from Bolshevik elements in Russia, and that she came to Huntingtower at the invitation of its owner, her childhood friend Quentin Kennedy. On arrival she was betrayed by the corrupt local factor, James Loudon, and was taken prisoner. She fears the imminent arrival of a man who is likely to kill her – later disclosed as the Bolshevik leader Paul Abreskov. She is desperately hoping for the appearance of a 'friend' to whom she has sent word (Alexis Nicolaevich, her fiancé).

Saskia has been placed in charge of her family's jewels, and McCunn agrees to deposit them with his local bank in Glasgow. They learn that Paul's followers are expected to arrive by sea in a Danish brig. Heritage is left alone in the Old Tower nearby to act as a decoy.

McCunn speaks to a local English landowner, Sir Archibald Roylance, who asks the chief constable for police help. After being rescued from an ambush by Wee Jaikie, the youngest of the Die-Hards, McCunn stumbles alone through the woods and comes across a man with a motorcycle whom he recognises from the inn. He is Saskia's fiancé Alexis, who has been delayed searching for 'Darkwater' rather than Dalquaharter.

The men from the brig surround the Old Tower and Heritage flutters a scarf at a window to make it appear that Saskia is there. The attackers explode a bomb to force entry, setting the tower alight. Saskia shows herself at a distance then runs back to Huntingtower, helped by Alexis who has just arrived. Their position looks hopeless as the enemy, commanded now by Paul Abreskov, force their way in through the downstairs windows. The Die-Hards get in among the attackers and shout and blow whistles pretending to be the police. In the stormy darkness, panic ensues and the attackers flee to their boats. The vessels founder in the storm and most of the enemy, including Abreskov, perish.

McCunn decides that he would like to do something practical to help the Die-Hard boys and he resolves to pay for their future educations. Meanwhile, Heritage is reconciled that Saskia has found her true mate in Alexis and that she can never be his. On recovering the family's jewels, Saskia gives one of them to McCunn as a memento. He in turn gives it to his wife.

== Principal characters ==
First US edition, published by Doran

=== Locals ===
- Dickson McCunn, wealthy retired 55-year-old Glasgow grocer
- John Heritage, young English poet and ex-soldier
- Dougal Crombie, leader of the Gorbals Die-Hards
- Jaikie Galt ('Wee Jaikie'), small, but fierce, member of the Die-Hards
- Sir Archibald 'Archie' Roylance, English landowner
- Quentin Kennedy, childhood friend of Saskia, soldier and diplomat
- Phemie Morran, widow, owner of small cottage in Dalquaharter
- James Loudon, corrupt factor for the Huntingtower estate.

=== Russians ===
- Saskia, fugitive princess, of one of the great families of Russia
- Alexis Nicolaevich ('Alexander Nicholson'), fiancé to Saskia
- Eugènie, elderly cousin of Saskia
- Paul Abreskov, Bolshevik leader, much feared by Saskia.

== Background ==
The book was written only a few years after the Russian Revolution when there was considerable concern that Bolshevism might spread. Buchan mixes light fairytale elements (he called the book "a Glasgow fairytale") with a darker plot in which Bolshevik elements have penetrated every level of British society. Although the normal forces of law and order are powerless, revolution in Britain is averted by the down-to-earth, middle class views of McCunn, the grocer. As one Russian character says of him, admiringly, "he is the stuff which above all others makes a great people. He will endure when aristocracies crack and proletariats crumble."

== Critical reception ==
Initial reviews were generally favourable. The New York Times found the book delightful, if improbable, and concluded that "no one who becomes acquainted with McCunn … will be likely to forget him".

In The Interpreter's House (1975), David Daniell called the book "a stirring adventure of royal Russian exiles and wicked Bolsheviks", and he noted its high spirits and outrageous wisdom, as well as the author's exuberance of imagination and his sensitivity to countryside and to weather. It is the Die-Hards, according to Daniell, that lift the book to its true level: "it is their individuality, passion and energy, and forthright sense … which must finally rescue Buchan from the foolish judge of snobbery". And, "What defeats the invasion of Hell is the ability of a group of ordinary people of all ages, so ordinary as to be normally overlooked, to respond to romance".

== Adaptations ==
A silent film Huntingtower based on the novel was released in 1928. It was directed by George Pearson, and featured the music hall performer Harry Lauder. Rights were sold for a play and another film, but neither were ultimately produced.

There have been three BBC Radio adaptations: a single-programme adaptation by TP Maley, broadcast on 5SC Glasgow in 1929; a three-part dramatisation for the BBC Home Service by Derek Walker, broadcast as a Schools programme in 1955; and a 1988 adaptation in three parts by Trevor Royle, with Roy Hanlon playing Dickson McCunn.

In 1957 Huntingtower was adapted by Judith Kerr for a six-part BBC children's television series starring James Hayter as McCunn. A second television adaptation by Edward Boyd was produced by BBC Scotland and broadcast over six episodes starting in October 1978. It starred Paul Curran as McCunn.
