= Shelley Williams =

Fictional character from Emmerdale

- Emmerdale character
- Portrayed by: Carolyn Pickles
- Duration: 2003–2005
- First appearance: 7 July 2003
- Last appearance: 17 March 2005
- Introduced by: Steve Frost (2003); Kathleen Beedles (2005)

Shelley Williams is a fictional character from the British television soap opera Emmerdale, played by Carolyn Pickles.

== Storylines ==
Shelley falls in love with Alan Turner (Richard Thorp), only to face violent opposition from his daughter, Steph (Lorraine Chase). Shelley and Steph later become sworn enemies. Shelley leaves the village for a while but returns to see Alan, much to Steph's annoyance. Alan is "ill" in bed being "looked after" by Steph at this point. Steph lies to Shelley and tells her that Alan is asleep and does not want to be disturbed. Shelley tells Steph that she is going to collect her things and to see Alan. Steph, angry, pushes Shelley down the cellar stairs, ties her to a chair, and gags her. Shelley attempts to escape by pushing a pile of boxes onto Steph and kicking her in the ribs. However, Steph has the keys to the cellar door, and grabs Shelley by the hair and tells her that they are going on a little trip. After everyone finds out what Steph has been doing to Alan, the police question her about Shelley's disappearance. Steph tells the police she cannot remember. While in jail, Steph has flashbacks of killing Shelley.

Shelley later turns up, showing herself to Alan while he is on his own. He is shocked but delighted to see her alive and well. Shelley tells Alan that Steph took her to the woods and that Steph told her to run or she would kill her. When the police discover Shelly is alive, Steph is released. Steph returns to the village and tries to make amends with Shelley, Alan, and Alan's friends in the village. Although Alan thinks it's a good idea to give his daughter a chance, Shelley tells him that Steph is evil and can never be forgiven. Shelley confronts Steph in the church and tells Steph that she can never hurt her or Alan again. Steph asks if they can be friends, but Shelley tells Steph to go to hell.

Shelley hates staying in the village whilst Steph is around and decides to leave. Shelley and Alan say farewell and she leaves in a taxi. Steph tells Alan that she will track Shelley down for him and convince her to come back. Steph eventually finds Shelley her on a ferry. Shelley tries to run away from Steph, and when a member of the crew see that Steph has no ticket, they force her to leave the ferry. However, Steph sneaks back onto the ferry. In a subsequent confrontation between the two, Steph grabs Shelley's arm, and while trying to free herself Shelley slips over the ferry railing and falls into the ocean. She is last seen being swept away in the strong surface waves, screaming for help. Steph, knowing she would be blamed for Shelley's death, throws Shelley's suitcase into the water.

Much later, Shelley's suitcase is found off the coast of Scotland. Alan becomes more convinced that Shelley may be dead since no money had been withdrawn from her bank account. Steph later tells her father about the struggle with Shelley.

Steph is later put on trial for her brother, Terence Turner's (Nick Brimble) death, despite Terence actually being killed by her husband, Adam Forsythe (Richard Shelton). Steph admits to the court that she watched someone die (referring to Shelley, not Terence). She and her husband are sentenced to life imprisonment for Terence's murder.

In 2015, Val Pollard (Charlie Hardwick) is inspired by Shelley's death when planning to fake her own death to avoid going to prison, and persuades her husband Eric Pollard (Chris Chittell) to go along with it.

== Reception ==
Cameron Robertson of the Daily Mirror said the scenes of Shelley trapped in the cellar were "chilling".

Beth Neil of the Evening Chronicle was left confused by the Shelley/Steph storyline. She stated that Steph "bound, gagged and beat up Shelly before locking her in a cellar. She later drove poor old Shell into the middle of nowhere, dumped her in woodland and left her for dead. Nice." After listing Steph's other crimes and noting how the villagers had forgotten all about them, Neil wrote "And somehow, Alan seems to think Shelly should welcome her back into the bosom of friendship. Er, what?!" Neil thought the scriptwriters had got "carried away" with the storyline and then became "hopelessly lost."
