= Adam Forsythe =

Fictional character from Emmerdale

- Emmerdale character
- Portrayed by: Richard Shelton
- Duration: 2005–2006
- First appearance: 13 May 2005
- Last appearance: 10 November 2006
- Introduced by: Kathleen Beedles
In-universe information
- Occupation: General practitioner
- Father: Adam Forsythe Sr.
- Wife: Isla Forsythe (until 2005); Steph Stokes (2006)

Adam Forsythe is a fictional character from the British ITV soap opera Emmerdale. He was played by Richard Shelton.

== Casting ==
Shelton's casting was announced in April 2005. Adam was introduced as the village's new doctor and a love interest for Steph Stokes (Lorraine Chase). Shelton said "I'm delighted to be joining 'Emmerdale' and have been a fan of the show for many years". He added: "Adam is a great character and it will be interesting to see what the writers have got planned for him." An 'Emmerdale' spokesperson said: "Dr Forsythe will create a stir with the locals from the moment he sets foot in the village, but there is more to him than meets the eye."

In an interview with the Daily Express, Shelton expressed a desire to return, despite his character being killed off. He said "Well allegedly [he killed himself]… we never did that scene. I ended up in prison because I lost the plot, well Adam lost the plot. I think he was well intentioned, but yeah he went off the rails, he was a bit overzealous with his ambitions. "And yeah, he ended up in prison and he allegedly killed himself, although, did he? We never saw the body, so I don’t know". Shelton admitted: ""I think I’d love to go back for a short time, I don’t think I’d want to return for a long time, because I’ve got the music now and that’s my immediate focus.

== Development ==
In his first medical emergency, Adam is tasked with helping teenager Debbie Dingle (Charley Webb) with helping deliver her baby, Sarah in the woods. Shelton described the scene as "intimate" which he had to be "brave for". He revealed: "Charley is great, my first scene was with Charley. I was playing a doctor, she was having a baby in the woods. I remember saying 'Are you kidding me? I’ve never delivered a baby, I don’t know what to do. There were two midwives standing by, acting this [scene] and trying to remember lines, it was quite an intimate thing. This is what happens as an actor, you’ve got to dive right in and you forget any embarrassment. I’m a doctor and helping someone deliver a baby in the woods, I remember looking up at one point going, 'Am I doing this right? They were like, "You’re doing a great job!." I'm not going to lie, it was a bit like, "Wow"." He added "It’s one thing acting on stage when there’s a distance between you, but when it’s television, it’s so intimate, the cameras are right there and right up against you and it’s got to be real. I had to let go of everything and I had to be a bit brave, you get over the embarrassment very quickly".

== Storylines ==
Adam arrives in Emmerdale, following his divorce from Isla Forsythe (Sara Griffiths). His first medical emergency in the village is being alerted by Daz Eden (Luke Tittensor) to Debbie Dingle in labour while in Seth Armstrong's (Stan Richards) hut. Adam safely delivers Debbie's daughter, Sarah. Adam sets up a clinic in the church hall and works hard to gain the respect and admiration of his new neighbours. Working in the village and winning over pensioners Edna Birch (Shirley Stelfox) and Betty Eagleton (Paula Tilbrook) with his well-worn charm offensive, Adam begins spending time with B&B manager Steph and there is an attraction between the two of them and they begin a relationship

Steph confesses to Adam that her brother Terence Turner (Nick Brimble) had sexually abused her as a child. Horrified by the revelations, Adam vows to support Steph and appeals to her to tell her father Alan (Richard Thorp) what had happened. Worse is to come when Alan resumes contact with Terence. Terence's presence in the village casts a shadow over Adam and Steph's relationship. However, during a physical confrontation at the Woolpack with Adam, Terence admits the abuse to Alan. Terence then leaves but returns a few weeks later after finding out Adam had been struck off for assaulting a child that had bitten him and therefore was practicing medicine illegal. Terence begins blackmailing Adam, who panics. When Adam arrives home he finds Terence cornering Steph. A struggle ensues and Adam drugs Terence to subdue him but it is only effective for so long, as Terence regains consciousness and attacks Adam, who retaliates by hitting him with a stool which has little effect. Adam and Steph run upstairs but Terence grabs Steph, cornering her. Adam returns and strikes Terence with a fire extinguisher, causing him to fall down the stairs, killing him. Adam and Steph then bury Terence's body under the cover of darkness in the woods. Fearing Steph will confesses, Adam whisks her away to Barbados and they marry there. When they return, Steph's paranoia grows and Adam tries to keep her quiet by drugging her but to no avail. Adam lets Steph confess to Alan and takes him to the woods where Terence is buried only to find there is no corpse after digging, meaning Adam has moved the body, leaving Steph's sanity in question. When the King's River Showhome development explodes, Terence's body is discovered in the rubble.

Adam flees the village after attempting to kill Steph. The police discover that Adam was able to continue to illegally practice medicine, because his father, who had the same name and was also a doctor, died whilst abroad in Africa and Adam did not inform the authorities (the GMC and coroner's office) in the UK, but merely obtained and started using his dead father's Medical Registration documents. He is eventually arrested and remanded in custody. Three weeks later on the first day of Steph's trial, Adam is seen being led into a prison van in handcuffs. Steph spots him when court is adjourned for the day and flies at him in a rage. Adam smugly tells Steph he will see her tomorrow. Adam takes the stand to testify against his wife and is cross-examined, bringing his own offences which include allegations of sexual assault to light. Adam, rattled, tells the court of Steph killing Shelley Williams (Carolyn Pickles). Isla testifies reiterating Adam's statement that Steph confessed to him but Steph's lawyer shoots her down. Steph eventually confesses to killing Terence but tells the court that Adam was an accomplice and receives life imprisonment. Adam is last seen dismayed after learning that he has been implicated. Several days later, Alan arrives to see Adam only to learn from Isla that he has committed suicide by hanging himself.

== See also ==
- List of Emmerdale characters
