= List of Emmerdale characters introduced in 2005 =

The following is a list of characters that first appeared in the British soap opera Emmerdale in 2005, by order of first appearance. All characters were introduced by the soap's executive producer, Keith Richardson.

== Max King ==
Max King
- Emmerdale character
- Portrayed by: Charlie Kemp
- First appearance: 3 January 2005
- Last appearance: 2 October 2005
- Introduced by: Kathleen Beedles
In-universe information
- Occupation: Veterinary surgeon
- Father: Tom King
- Mother: Mary King
- Brothers: Jimmy King; Matthew King; Carl King
- Half-sisters: Scarlett Nicholls
- Grandfathers: Albert King
- Nephews: Thomas King; Carl Holliday; Elliot Windsor
- Nieces: Angelica King; Anya King
- Other relatives: Phyllis King

Max King, portrayed by Charlie Kemp, arrives in the village after backpacking with his girlfriend to attend his father's ill-fated wedding to Charity Dingle (Emma Atkins). He then gets a job at Paddy Kirk's (Dominic Brunt) vet practice to support more travelling ventures. However, he is conned by his father in order to get land. Tom uses Max's position as a vet to poison the animals kept by the owners who refused to sell the land.

After having been bullied into poisoning the Briggs family's calves by Tom, a guilty Max decides to leave the village, sick and tired of his father's chicanery. He and Robert Sugden (Karl Davies) plan to leave Emmerdale and drive to London, but Robert's adopted brother Andy (Kelvin Fletcher) gets into a fight with Robert. Max breaks up the fight and decides that he did not want to go with Robert. He gets into Andy's Land Rover and asks him to drive him to the railway station. Robert, who had driven off, turns his car round and drove straight at them, causing Max to grab the steering wheel and send the vehicle off the road, through a stone wall and onto its roof. Andy makes a quick escape assisted by Robert, but Max becomes trapped in the car and is killed when fuel stored in the back explodes.

== Phyllis King ==
Phyllis King
- Emmerdale character
- Portrayed by: Sheila Burrell
- Duration: 2005, 2007
- First appearance: 3 January 2005
- Last appearance: 9 October 2007
- Introduced by: Keith Richardson
In-universe information
- Family: King
- Brothers: Albert King
- Nephews: Tom King
- Other relatives: Jimmy King; Carl King; Matthew King; Max King; Scarlett Nicholls; Thomas King; Elliot Windsor; Anya King; Angelica King

Phyllis King is Tom King's (Kenneth Farrington) aunt. She is the sister of Tom's father Albert, Phyllis first appears for Tom's ill-fated wedding to Charity Dingle (Emma Atkins). Often complaining, Phyllis only seems happy to see her favourite great-nephew Carl (Tom Lister). She returns later in October 2005 for Max’s funeral and in February 2007 for Tom's funeral. She made her most recent appearance at Jimmy King's (Nick Miles) ill-fated wedding to Kelly Windsor (Adele Silva) in October 2007.

It is very likely that Phyllis has died since 2007 as she hasn't attended any family events since, such as her favourite great-grand nephew, Carl King's (Tom Lister) wedding to Lexi Nicholls (Sally Oliver) in 2009, or his funeral after being murdered by Cameron Murray (Dominic Power) in 2012, or Jimmy King's (Nick Miles) wedding to Nicola De Souza (Nicola Wheeler) in 2010. Sheila Burrell, who played Phyllis, died in 2011.

== Libby Charles ==
Libby Charles
- Emmerdale character
- Portrayed by: Ty Glaser
- First appearance: 9 January 2005
- Last appearance: 18 July 2005
- Introduced by: Keith Richardson
In-universe information
- Occupation: Receptionist
- Sisters: Tamsin Charles

Libby Charles was the girlfriend of Andy Sugden (Kelvin Fletcher). She appeared in 2005.

Libby and her sister Tamsin (Jenny Gleave) are first glimpsed on horseback by Andy and his younger brother Daz (Luke Tittensor). The sisters come from money, and Libby asks Andy about renting out his stables. Andy hopes for a date, but is disappointed to learn she has a boyfriend. Libby begins working as a receptionist at the vets and has to fend off the flirtations of Max King (Charlie Kemp). When she loses interest in her boyfriend, she begins dating Andy. She's rattled when she learns he had a relationship with underage Debbie Dingle (Charley Webb), but she and Andy become closer and closer, with Libby even planning to open a business on his farm, giving pony rides to children. Their happy relationship ends when Andy learns Debbie has given birth to his child. Andy wants to do right by the baby, so he breaks up with Libby to be with Debbie. Libby puts up a good front, but is clearly hurt. A few weeks later, she announces her plans to spend the summer in Italy with her sister Tamsin. She offers to give Paddy Kirk (Dominic Brunt) her notice, but he fires her with immediate effect and she leaves.

== Tamsin Charles ==
Tamsin Charles
- Emmerdale character
- Portrayed by: Jenny Gleave
- First appearance: 9 January 2005
- Last appearance: 23 June 2005
- Introduced by: Keith Richardson
In-universe information
- Sisters: Libby Charles

Tamsin Charles is the sister of Libby Charles (Ty Glaser). She appeared between 9 January and 23 June 2005. Tamsin first appeared on horseback with Libby, but the two girls have very different personalities. Tamsin has little time for quaint village life or a hard day's work. Her father forces her to get a job, but her stint as secretary for the Kings is short-lived, as she is more interested in using the computer to shop for shoes. When The Woolpack is desperate for a new barmaid, Tamsin is hired, but spends most of her time on breaks. After repeatedly clashing with barman Paul Lambert (Matthew Bose), Tamsin quits her job before he can fire her, and storms out of the pub.

== Kayleigh Gibbs ==
Kayleigh Gibbs
- Emmerdale character
- Portrayed by: Lily Jane Stead
- Duration: 2005–2010
- First appearance: 30 March 2005
- Last appearance: 2 February 2010
- Introduced by: Keith Richardson
In-universe information
- Father: Martin Crowe

Kayleigh Gibbs was a friend of Victoria Sugden.

Kayleigh first appears in March 2005, attending Victoria Sugden's (Hannah Midgley) 11th birthday party. Kayleigh's father, DC Martin Crowe (Graeme Hawley), is a police officer. She helps him to woo Louise Appleton (Emily Symons) and they soon move in with Louise. Kayleigh and Victoria enjoy winding Louise up. Martin finds out that Louise once killed a man, and decides he cannot stay with her, so he and Kayleigh move out. He does not tell Kayleigh the real reason why he has left Louise, and months later, she returns and asks Louise why they split up. Louise lies and says things just did not work out and Kayleigh, not believing her, says she never wants to see her again.

Although she no longer lives in the village, Kayleigh is still friends with Victoria and appears with her. Together they have sneaked into clubs, and egged the post office, causing a pregnant Viv Hope to collapse. In November 2008, Victoria and Kayleigh get money off various people in order to buy tickets to a New Year's Party, and in December, is seen when Aaron Livesy (Danny Miller) is bullying Victoria.

Kayleigh next appears in November 2009 and is involved in a bullying story with Hannah Barton (Grace Cassidy). Kayleigh takes a disliking to Victoria being friends with Hannah and send her insulting text messages. After Hannah told her parents what had been going on, they confront Victoria, believing her to be just as involved as Kayleigh. Victoria promises that she will ask Kayleigh to lay off Hannah. However, the following day, she returns from school covered in cuts and bruises having got into a fight with Kayleigh. Victoria ends her friendship with Kayleigh and she is not seen again.

== Rita Brannigan ==
Rita Brannigan
- Emmerdale character
- Portrayed by: Emma Kearney
- Duration: 2005–2007
- First appearance: 18 July 2005
- Last appearance: 4 July 2007
- Introduced by: Keith Richardson
In-universe information
- Father: Jeff Brannigan
- Mother: Sue Brannigan
- Sisters: Sally Brannigan

Rita Brannigan played by Emma Kearney made her first appearance on 18 July 2005. Rita was introduced as a new love interest for Paddy Kirk (Dominic Brunt) following his separation from Emily Kirk (Kate McGregor). Kearney had undergone weight loss prior to securing the role of Rita. She told Mike Glendenning of the Manchester Evening News: "I hadn't been to one of these groups before but when I got on the scales and saw the reading, I decided there and then that I was never getting that big again. I've never stuck to a diet before, but this isn't a diet, it's just a different way of living." Speaking her character Rita, Kearnery said "Paddy, who has just split from Emily, has a night out with Marlon and brings her back home. I had a great craic doing it, Rita's very bubbly and energetic and I'm waiting to see if she'll become a recurring character." She added: "I'd always watched Emmerdale so this was pretty big for me, sitting in The Woolpack with the cast and crew, but they're an awful humble and lovely bunch of people, very kind and welcoming and it was really nice to be able to work on it."

Rita meets Paddy on a night out and they go back to Smithy Cottage but they wake up Paddy's estranged wife Emily, which leads to an awkward encounter. Rita then leaves. The following year, Rita returns when she bumps into Paddy, Marlon, Donna Windsor-Dingle (Verity Rushworth) and Toni Daggert (Kerry Stacey). Rita recognises Marlon but he fails to recognise her but Paddy does, much to Toni's annoyance. Paddy and Rita reconect but when Toni is rejected, Paddy leaves Rita and takes Toni home.

Several months later, when Paddy takes a life drawing class, he is shocked when Rita is the nude model. Paddy later takes Rita for a drink in the Woolpack and she gives her number but fails to write it down and it is smudged, so he is unable to call her. When they meet at the class, Rita accepts it and they plan a date. However, a prank from the Dingle family leaves Paddy stuck in the middle of nowhere at the mercy of a charging bull. Rita rescues Paddy and they finally go on a date, which is almost cut short when Marlon's cab nearly runs over Rita. Paddy is able to save her in the nick of time. Rita begins praising Paddy heavily for saving her life and wants her parents, Jeff and Sue to meet him. Paddy is further annoyed when the Brannigans continually praise him and he snaps, which causes Sue to run off crying. Jeff tells Paddy that Rita's sister, Sally had been killed eight months earlier in a hit-and-run accident. Paddy tries to apologise but Rita refuses to listen.

Paddy, attempting to win Rita back, poses as a life model in one of her art classes and is successful. When Hari Prasad (John Nayagam), Paddy's partner in the vet practice begins embezzling money from the company accounts, Rita notices it but thinks it is a mistake. After Hari is remanded in custody and business suffers, Rita talks to Jasmine Thomas (Jenna-Louise Coleman) and asks her to print an article in The Hotten Courier to reassure people about the vets. However, things backfire when Jasmine's boss, John McNally edits the article to point out the fraud and implicates Paddy. Paddy is furious and his mood is not helped when Rita organises a surprise party for him in the Woolpack. Paddy and Rita then agree to take a break from each other.

== Effie Harrison ==
Effie Harrison
- Emmerdale character
- Portrayed by: Phillipa Peak
- First appearance: 29 May 2005
- Last appearance: 20 September 2005
- Introduced by: Keith Richardson
In-universe information
- Occupation: Nanny

Effie Harrison is Jean Tate's live-in nanny. She is hired by Zoe Tate to live in Home Farm and look after her daughter Jean. Effie and Zoe become close, and Effie initially supports Zoe as she faces an attempted murder trial - after an altercation with Jean's father Scott Windsor - but their friendship splinters when Effie turns down Zoe's romantic advances and plea to run away with the kids. As Zoe becomes more erratic, Effie begins to doubt her innocence, and takes an offer from Sadie King to double-cross Zoe.

Effie abruptly becomes lovers with Zoe and persuades her to revive the idea of leaving with the children. At the getaway spot, Effie and Jean are nowhere to be found, but Sadie is there, and she forces Zoe to sell her Home Farm. When Zoe returns home, Effie pleads with her to understand, but Zoe punches her. After Zoe evicts Effie, she asks Sadie for the £10,000 she was promised. Sadie instead throws a few pieces of change onto the street - "30 pieces of silver" - and tells Effie that Zoe is more of a woman than she'll ever be. Effie is left on her hands and knees, scrounging for change.

== Sarah Sugden ==
Sarah Sugden first appears on 5 June 2005. Since her first appearance, Sarah has been played by numerous actresses; Lily-May Bartley, Lucy Warren, Amber Child-Cavill, Sophia Amber Moore, and currently Katie Hill, who took over the role in 2017. Her storylines in the soap have included her diagnosis of Fanconi anaemia, her subsequent health struggles following her diagnosis and becoming involved with drug dealer Danny Harrington (Louis Healy).

== Avril Kent ==
Avril Kent
- Emmerdale character
- Portrayed by: Melanie Hill
- First appearance: 26 July 2005
- Last appearance: 23 August 2005
- Introduced by: Keith Richardson

Avril Kent, portrayed bu Melanie Hill, is a love interest of Bob Hope (Tony Audenshaw). Hill's casting was announced on 27 May 2005 and was revealed to only be in the programme for four weeks. After Bob's recent split from wife Viv Hope (Deena Payne), he joins a dating agency where he meets Avril, who is very similar to his ex-wife. They go on a date and she subsequently has a fight with Viv, who confesses her love for Bob, causing Avril to walk off followed by Bob. Bob and Avril part on good terms and he proposes to Viv. Speaking of her casting, Hill said: "I’ve always been a big fan of Emmerdale and I’m really excited to be joining the show." Executive producer Kathleen Beadles spoke of Hill's casting: "We are thrilled to confirm that Melanie will be playing the character of Avril. It’s a fantastically funny storyline and we are looking forward to welcoming her on-set."

== Sandra Briggs ==
Sandra Briggs
- Emmerdale character
- Portrayed by: Sally Ann Matthews
- Duration: 2005–2006
- First appearance: 11 August 2005
- Last appearance: 26 February 2006
- Introduced by: Keith Richardson
In-universe information
- Occupation: Machinist
- Husband: Craig Briggs

Sandra Briggs is married to Craig Briggs. She first appeared on screen on 11 August 2005 and made her last appearance on screen on 26 February 2006. On 25 June 2005, it was announced that former Coronation Street actress Sally Ann Matthews would be joining Emmerdale as Sandra Briggs. A spokesperson said "Sally Ann will be joining us, and will begin filming shortly." Matthews said "I am thrilled to be asked to play the role of Sandra Briggs. I have been a huge fan of Emmerdale for many years now and I just can't wait to begin filming." Series producer Kathleen Beedles revealed: "Her character Sandra will be caught in the crossfire as the Kings ruthlessly battle to secure the land they need for their housing development." In a later interview with Inside Soap, the show's executive producer, Kathleen Beedles, admitted casting Matthews, well known to soap fans from Coronation Street, in what would essentially become a minor role was a mistake.

Sandra is married to Craig, a local farmer. When Tom King (Ken Farrington) wants to buy their land, he sends his son Max (Charlie Kemp), a vet, to kill their livestock. Sandra and Craig are furious with the Kings but are unable to tell the police for insurance reasons, so Max's boss Paddy Kirk (Dominic Brunt) takes the blame. Sandra needs more money so she gets a job at Eric Pollard (Christopher Chittell)'s factory as a machinist. She works with Val Lambert (Charlie Hardwick) and Delilah Dingle (Hayley Tamaddon).

== Jimmy Pepper ==
Jimmy Pepper
- Emmerdale character
- Portrayed by: Michael Gunn
- First appearance: 23 August 2005
- Last appearance: 7 September 2005
- Introduced by: Keith Richardson
In-universe information
- Sons: Dane Pepper; Shane Pepper
- Daughters: Sharon Lambert
- Granddaughters: Alice

Jimmy Pepper is a former partner of Val Pollard. He appeared in 2005. Jane Simon of the Daily Mirror described Jimmy as "having a face like a walrus" and "not a man to be crossed".

Val and Jimmy had a relationship in the 1970s and it was assumed that he was Paul Lambert (Matthew Bose) and Sharon Lambert's father. However, he and his sons beat Paul when he was growing up and was a terrible father but paid Val thousands in maintenance until, in 2005, he learns that he is not Paul's father and was annoyed to learn that he had paid maintenance for a child that was not his. Jimmy is further enraged to learn that Paul is gay and arrives to see Val and demands that she repay him $5000 or he will beat Paul up again. Val is then driven to steal money from the Woolpack. When Val gives Jimmy the money, she asks him to hit her, Jimmy initially refuses but she winds him up to the point where he punches her harder than she had expected. Jimmy then leaves with the takings and Val, sporting a black eye, invents a story that she was mugged on the way to the bank with the takings.

== Noreen Bell ==
Noreen Bell
- Emmerdale character
- Portrayed by: Jenny Tomasin
- Duration: 2005–2006
- First appearance: 14 December 2005
- Last appearance: 14 July 2006
- Introduced by: Keith Richardson
In-universe information
- Other relatives: Gilbert Duff

Noreen Doreen Bell, played by former Upstairs, Downstairs actress, Jenny Tomasin is a cantankerous pensioner who irritates Val Pollard (Charlie Hardwick) when the latter is doing community service in late 2005. Noreen lives on the far side of the village in Tall Trees Cottage, and wears a wig and fake eyebrows. Noreen later strikes up a mutual friendship with Val and Sandy Thomas (Freddie Jones).

Noreen dies on 13 July 2006 when she is having a look around the Kings' show home. She opens a cupboard door and is blasted by a gas explosion, catapulting her down the stairs and killing her instantly. In her will, she left her money to Val and her thimble collection to her second cousin, Gilbert Duff, who was played by Christopher Beeny, who she co-starred in Upstairs, Downstairs with.

== Other characters ==
Character	Episode date(s)	Actor	Circumstances
Amy Carter	3-7 January	Bethany Webb	The girlfriend of Max King (Charlie Kemp). Max and Amy had spent time traveling and arrive in the village for his father Tom's (Kenneth Farrington) ill-fated wedding to Charity Dingle (Emma Atkins) before intending to travel to Thailand after visiting Amy's parents in Cornwall. The King family treats her with open contempt. The wedding ends in disaster, and Tom re-evaluates his life and demands that Max stay and get a job. Max agrees, and an upset Amy says she will wait for him. However, he tells her to go to Cornwall without him. She tells him that they will keep in touch, but as she leaves the village in a taxi, Max deletes her number from his mobile phone.
Moira Stanley	23 January-7 February	Kate Hampson	The cellmate of Steph Stokes (Lorraine Chase). When Steph is remanded in prison to await trial for the murder of Shelley Williams (Carolyn Pickles), she shares a cell with Moira. Steph has very little patience with Moira, who is very clingy and insecure. At one point Steph tells curate Ethan Blake (Liam O'Brien) that Moira reminds her of Shelley. Steph is freed when Shelley turns up alive and decides not to press charges. As a goodbye gift, Steph gives Moira her radio.
Steven Dickinson	25 January-4 February	Oliver Hingston	A lawyer who represents Steph Stokes (Lorraine Chase) when she is accused of the presumed murder of Shelley Williams (Carolyn Pickles). Steph makes his job difficult, as she moves in and out of sanity and cannot remember whether or not she killed Shelley. After a few weeks, Shelley turns up alive and Steph is freed.
Marian Winters	13-17 February	Ann Aris	A widow who has recently lost her husband, and seeks counsel from curate Ethan Blake (Liam O'Brien) about moving away from the village, but she is unnerved by the presence of Steph Stokes (Lorraine Chase) and quickly exits. Soon she speaks to Eric Pollard (Chris Chittell) about selling some of her belongings to help finance her move. Eric, sensing an opportunity to make money, gives her less than the actual value of her antiques so he can sell them and make a healthy profit.
Johnny Hupton	22 February-2 March	Andrew Whitehead	A food representative for Super Fresh who shows up at Viv Hope's (Deena Payne) café for business, but Viv, recently separated from her husband, is in the mood for romance. She convinces Johnny to go on a date, but her aggressiveness causes him to flee The Woolpack within a half-hour.
Lynda Ashby	18 March-16 June	Deborah Cooley Chad	An old girlfriend of Matthew King. When Matthew, Louise Appleton, and Terry Woods decide to open a bed and breakfast, they agree to check out Moorview B&B, run by Lynda Ashby. Terry has a scheduling conflict, so Matthew and Louise dine alone, as a jealous Lynda looks on. Several months later, Matthew and Louise return for a brief tryst. Lynda remarks to Matthew that he's been too busy to drop by, and as he looks at a pregnant Lynda, he smirks and says she's obviously been otherwise engaged as well.
Sian Harper	22 March-3 April	Maeve Larkin	An acquaintance of Matthew King. She appeared in 2005 in the Woolpack. A few weeks later, Matthew invites her for dinner with himself, Terry Woods. When Sian realises becomes angry and leaves soon after dinner.
Ivy Lynch	13-21 April	Mags Gannon	A customer of Scott Windsor. When Scott needs a car for his girlfriend Dawn Woods to practice driving lessons in. When Ivy, whom he takes as an easily manipulated old woman, stops by the garage for repairs, he convinces her that her car is a death trap he can generously buy from her. She sells him the car at a cheap price, but several days later, a furious Ivy and her muscular son Phil confront Scott and Dawn. When Dawn learns what Scott has done, she gives them the car and as compensation, also gives them some of the money they try to return to Scott.
Juliet Garside	22-23 May	Jo Ellis	A receptionist at King & Sons. After the departure of Chloe Atkinson, Tom King goes through several receptionists, including Juliet. Tom admires Juliet's work and is disappointed, if not surprised, when she tells him she has to quit because of sexual harassment from Jimmy King.
Neville Gunn	27-29 May	Trevor Williams	An acquaintance of Chas Dingle. When Chas' old flame Carl King takes her out for a drink, and she runs into Neville, an old friend from her days as a stripper. Carl plans to take Chas back to his place, but Neville joins them, and Neville and Chas spend most of the night laughing over old times.
Isla Forsythe	24 October-12 November 2006	Sara Griffiths	The ex-wife of Adam Forsythe, who arrives in Emmerdale to amicably end her marriage to Adam. She returns a year later when she informs Adam's father-in-law Alan Turner that he has committed suicide while in prison.
Rose Meyers	19 May-29 June	Charlotte West-Oram	A temporary postmistress who covers for Viv Windsor at the Post Office.
Kara Warren	22 June-22 September	Julie Saunders	A local police officer. When Scott Windsor is left comatose from Zoe Tate's multiple injections of ketamine, Warren eventually comes to the conclusion that injecting Scott is defending herself from attack but injecting him twice means Zoe planned to kill Scott. Zoe is put on trial. After the case collapses, Warren offers to help Zoe if she wants to prosecute for attempted rape, but Zoe isn't interested.
Neil DePaul	22 June-22 September	Martin Troakes	A solicitor who represents Zoe Tate.
Jay Aswar	17 July-27 September	Guy Rhys	The former fiancé to Del Dingle. She flees to the Dingle homestead while still in her wedding dress, but is short on answers as to why. A comment Del makes in jest leads Zak Dingle and Cain Dingle to assume he beat her, and when Jay shows up to try to talk to Del, she has to stop them from roughing him up. Del explains to Jay that while she does care about him, she doesn't want to settle down with anyone. They part on friendly terms, so much so that she gives his name to her employer Val Lambert when Val needs to sell fabrics.
Delphine LaClair	15 September-29 August 2006	Brigit Forsyth	A sales representative for Rodney Blackstock when he planned to sell his vineyards to a French company. Rodney assumes she will be a young woman, and plans a romantic pursuit, but is discomfited when they meet, as she is his age. She's interested in him but he demurs. A few weeks later, Delphine is supposed to return to finalize details, but instead, her associates, who do not speak English, arrive at the B&B and cause a great deal of confusion for Steph Stokes. Delphine herself returns the following year.
Jordan Jones	29 December - 1 January 2006	Erin Shanagher	The ex-wife of Ivan Jones (Daniel Brocklebank). She is first seen when Ivan visits Jordan. Several days later, Ivan and Paul Lambert (Matthew Bose) collect Ivan's belongings from Jordan's house. When Jordan sees them she assumes they are a couple and laughs at them and taunts them. Paul is surrounded by a gang of homophobic youths led by Jordan's relative, Gaz but is rescued by Ivan who chases them off with a cricket bat.
