= Betty Eagleton =

Fictional character from Emmerdale

- Emmerdale character
- Portrayed by: Paula Tilbrook
- Duration: 1994–2015
- First appearance: 12 April 1994
- Last appearance: 25 December 2015
- Introduced by: Mervyn Watson
In-universe information
- Occupation: Retired cleaner
- Father: Arthur Prendegast
- Mother: Nora Prendegast
- Sisters: Margaret Prendegast
- Husband: Wally Eagleton (backstory)

Betty Eagleton is a fictional character from the British ITV soap opera Emmerdale, played by Paula Tilbrook. She made her first screen appearance during the episode broadcast on 12 April 1994. Betty is characterised as the village gossip who is kind hearted, fun and adventurous, and enjoys a sherry. Tilbrook was initially cast for three episodes and the character was introduced as the wartime girlfriend of Seth Armstrong (Stan Richards). Upon her arrival, the characters reconcile and their relationship continues until Seth's death in 2005. Tilbrook retired in 2015 and the character departs in the episode broadcast on 25 May 2015, returning briefly for a cameo appearance in the Christmas episode that year. The character and Tilbrook's performance were widely praised by both viewers and critics alike; Brian Beacom of The Herald labelled her "a national treasure".

== Storylines ==
Betty was born in Beckindale in January 1934, but left to work as a tiller girl in London. She later returned to Beckindale and married old school friend, Wally Eagleton in 1954. Following Wally's death in 1993, Betty returns to Beckindale village and finds her former partner Seth Armstrong (Stan Richards). They reconcile and host a 1940s theme night at Christmas. Betty regularly stands up for her beliefs, and even tries to call off Zoe Tate's (Leah Bracknell) lesbian wedding.

Betty's former boyfriend Reggie arrives in the village. It transpires that Betty and Reggie dated while working in the Windmill Theatre in London. On the day she went to tell him she was expecting their baby, she found him in bed with another woman and had an abortion. This left her unable to have any children of her own, which she kept a secret. Knowing this, Reggie tries to blackmail Betty by threatening to tell Seth. Instead, Betty tells him herself and Seth drives Reggie out of the village. Betty decides to visit her friend Kathy Glover (Malandra Burrows) in Australia and goes on an extended holiday in early 2004. Seth joins her, but she gets homesick and returns to Emmerdale alone several months later. On his way home in October 2005, Seth dies on the aeroplane; Betty was waiting at the airport when Kathy tells her the news that he has died.

After Seth's funeral, Betty takes the coffin and buries it in the countryside, helped by Laurel Thomas (Charlotte Bellamy), Zak Dingle (Steve Halliwell) and Sam Dingle (James Hooton). A fake coffin arrives containing a sack of sand and is buried in the Emmerdale cemetery. The funeral also sees the brief return of Betty and Seth's former lodger, Biff Fowler (Stuart Wade). Soon after, Alan Turner (Richard Thorp) moves in with Betty. After lamenting a lack of contact with his son, Terence Turner (Nick Brimble), Betty gets in touch with him and convinces him to return to the village. It soon emerges that Terence sexually abused his sister, Steph Stokes (Lorraine Chase), as a child; Betty discovers this and warns Alan. However, he struggles to accept this and lashes out at Betty, before moving into Holdgate Farm with Terence. Alan realises the truth not long after and apologetically returns. Steph's new husband, Adam Forsythe (Richard Shelton), murders Terence soon after this, and both Adam and Steph are sent to prison for their crime. As Betty and Alan struggle to get over this, a new person enters Betty's life: Sandy Thomas (Freddie Jones), the father of local vicar Ashley Thomas (John Middleton). Ashley and Sandy are estranged, so Sandy moves in with Betty and Alan.

When Mark Wylde's (Maxwell Caulfield) body is found, Betty originally thinks it might have been Seth's and admits to Alan that they buried him in Home Farm grounds and sandbags were buried at the cemetery. When a fire spreads through Emmerdale, it reaches Betty's house and she has to be rescued by the residents; she is taken to hospital suffering with smoke inhalation, but eventually recovers with the help of her friends Alan, Edna Birch (Shirley Stelfox) and Pearl Ladderbanks (Meg Johnson). Betty subsequently goes on a six-month cruise and upon returning, she sells her house to Victoria Sugden (Isabel Hodgins); she and Alan become sitting tenants. This causes some problems, particularly when Victoria insists on swapping bedrooms with Alan, but she also helps to do a lot of repair work that Alan and Betty are no longer capable of doing.

Betty is saddened when Alan dies in his sleep on the night of his return from a bike tour. With Pearl, she arranges a fitting funeral for Alan, but are shocked when his daughter, Steph, attends with a prison escort. Betty is on the judging panel to decide who the next vicar of Emmerdale will be – Ashley or newcomer Harriet Finch (Katherine Dow Blyton). Although Edna and Pearl are keen for Ashley to return, Betty feels that Harriet will be better able to modernise the church. Betty departs on a cruise around New Zealand by herself. On her return, she is furious when Victoria explains that she had stopped reading her emails because she found them boring. Betty later announces that she is leaving Emmerdale to move back to Australia, but makes up with Victoria shortly before she leaves. On the day of her departure, Betty learns that Laurel is an alcoholic and she advises her to get clean. A crowd gathers to see Betty off, before her new partner, Reuben Archibald (Edmund Herd), arrives in a limousine to take her away. On Christmas Day, she video calls Victoria, who then takes the laptop to the Woolpack where Betty talks to all of her friends. In 2017, Finn Barton (Joe Gill) visits Betty in Australia for three weeks, and the following year, Sandy goes to live with Betty in Australia. In February 2020, Betty rings Laurel to tell her that Sandy has died. She was mentioned again in January 2024, when Victoria went to stay with her for a few weeks to celebrate her 90th birthday (despite the actress' death four years prior to this, Betty remains alive but off-screen).

== Development ==
=== Characterisation ===
"I think Betty is likeable. She's a big softy with a hard crust. She lives on gossip and I think most women do. She gets me frustrated, she makes me laugh, and there are odd times that she makes me cry as well."

— Tilbrook on Betty's characterisation.

Betty is characterised as the village gossip who is fun, cheeky, flirtatious and adventurous. She enjoys finding out information about her neighbours and commenting on it with other people, but does not like finding out information last. Actor James Hooton dubbed the character "a busybody, who knew everybody's business". Despite her nosiness, Betty has a good heart and is a loyal friend. When choosing an alcoholic drink, Betty enjoys a sherry. Tilbrook thought that Betty's life experience has led her to believe that "she knows better than anyone else". She did not believe the character had changed dramatically in her stint on the soap, but did note that as she has aged, Betty has tried to "keep up with the times".

The character is a retired cleaner and lives in Keepers Cottage. In later years, she has entertained lodgers such as Alan Turner (Richard Thorp) and Victoria Sugden (Isabel Hodgins), the latter of whom she sold the cottage to at a discounted rate, on the condition that she and Alan could live there until their deaths. The character's backstory states that she was a Tiller Girl and was in a relationship with Seth Armstrong (Stan Richards) during the war, but chose marriage with scrap dealer Wally Eagleton instead. They separated after he chose his "old rag-and-bone" horse over her; he died in late 1993.

=== Relationship with Seth Armstrong ===
Tilbrook was cast as Betty in 1994 for an initial run of three episodes. The character made her first appearance in the episode originally broadcast on 12 April 1994, and her first scene was in The Woolpack pub where she ordered a sherry and asked about Seth. Betty was introduced as Seth's former wartime girlfriend and they were soon reunited, having both become widowed. Tilbrook thought that their reunion made Betty consider whether she should have chosen Seth instead. She added that she "liked the idea of two people in their autumn years". In the book 50 Years of Emmerdale, Tom Parfitt called Betty and Seth the "quintessential Emmerdale couple" with a "rich and chequered history". Betty and Seth planned to marry in December 1994 but changed their minds after deciding they were "too old to be exchanging vows" and instead, they held a 1940s themed party for the village. Richards explained that although Seth is "terrified" of Betty, she "loves him dearly, though – otherwise, she wouldn't stick with him."

The character's relationship was often used for comedic effect, something which Tilbrook enjoyed. In particular, she liked the everyday married life scenes they would portray as she deemed that very realistic and relatable. At one point, Betty and Seth were living in a caravan, which was stolen by the Dingle family while they were inside. When someone knocks on the door, Betty opens it and whacks the person on the head with a cast-iron pan, unaware that it is a policeman. Consequently, she was arrested. Tilbrook enjoyed this plot and found it fun to film. Seth cares a lot about horses and one story sees Betty offer the ultimatum of his horse or her. Tilbrook thought this was a tough choice for Seth, joking that the horse was "a good-looking horse". Richards died in 2005 and Seth was consequently written out of the series. In the narrative, Seth dies while returning from a trip to Australia. Betty is waiting for him at the airport when she learns the news.

=== Departure ===
Tilbrook's retirement was announced in April 2015, after 21 years portraying Betty. Tilbrook described her retirement as "both the saddest and the happiest day of my life" and was pleased to leave the show "on a high". Kate Oates, the show's series producer, said that it is "impossible to overstate how much everyone at Emmerdale will miss Paula". She described the actress as "an integral part of the Emmerdale family: an inspiration to those she works with, as well as a fabulous raconteur and hilarious storyteller". The character departs in the episode first broadcast on 25 May 2015, when she leaves the village after deciding to move to Australia with her new boyfriend. On her final day, she visits Seth's grave and speaks with Laurel Dingle (Charlotte Bellamy), who is struggling with alcoholism. Before she leaves, her friends express their concern that her new boyfriend is a conman, but Betty "silences everyone with an extravagant exit that the locals won't forget in a hurry!" Her boyfriend, Reuben Archibald (Edmund Herd), appears and is revealed to be a Seth "lookalike". Tilbrook felt "overawed" and extremely emotional about her character's departure. After deciding to retire, she spoke to Oates and asked her not to have her character murdered. She explained that she was "fed up of murders" and joked that Emmerdale village had become "a very, very dangerous place". Tilbrook returned for a cameo appearance via webcam in the episode first broadcast on 25 December 2015. Tilbrook died in December 2019, four years after her departure.

== Reception ==
Brian Beacom of The Herald called Betty "an immediate hit" on the soap and "a national treasure". He described her as "an international-class soap gossiper". Hooton thought the character was "iconic", while author Parfitt said she was "legendary". A reporter for The Irish Independent labelled Betty "a no-nonsense, sherry-loving northerner who was always the first to know the latest gossip". Series producer Kate Oates opined that Tilbrook had "created a British television icon: someone who has lit up our screens and touched our hearts". Aidan Millan, writing for the Metro, opined that Betty and Seth's relationship was "one of the best in Emmerdale history". A fan of Betty's pairing with Seth, Parfitt felt the relationship finished with "a poignant end" following Richards' death. Laura-Jane Tyler from Inside Soap praised the character during her final scenes, saying "She may be a touch frail these days, but Betty Eagleton proved she was still a force to be reckoned with in Emmerdale this week – funny, feisty and smart as a whip. They don't make 'em like actress Paula Tilbrook any more!" Daniel Kilkelly from Digital Spy included Betty's departure in his Picture of the day feature on 25 May 2015, and called her exit "heartwarming". The Metro's Duncan Lindsay praised Betty's exit story and commented, "Sending Betty away with a Seth lookalike was simply inspired."

== Bibliography ==
- Parfitt, Tom (29 September 2022). 50 Years of Emmerdale: The official story of TV's most iconic rural drama. Hachette UK. ISBN 978-1-78840-410-5.
