= Alan Turner (Emmerdale) =

Fictional character from Emmerdale

- Emmerdale character
- Portrayed by: Richard Thorp
- Duration: 1982–2013
- First appearance: 18 March 1982
- Last appearance: 4 June 2013
- Introduced by: Anne Gibbons
In-universe information
- Occupation: Businessman (until 1999); Estate manager (1982–1990); Barman (1990–1991); Pub landlord (1991–1999); Retired (1999–2013)
- Brothers: William Turner
- Wife: Jill Turner (backstory); Shirley Foster (1994)
- Sons: Terence Turner
- Daughters: Steph Stokes
- Granddaughters: Tricia Dingle

Alan Turner is a fictional character from the British ITV soap opera Emmerdale, played by Richard Thorp. He debuted on-screen on 23 March 1982. Thorp died on 22 May 2013 and the last scenes that Thorp filmed as Alan were aired on 4 June 2013 in a special hour-long episode dedicated to him. At the time of his death, he was the longest-running character in the programme. It was announced on 12 September 2013 that Alan would be killed off-screen in late October with his daughter Steph (Lorraine Chase) returning for his funeral. Alan died in his sleep on 24 October 2013.

== Casting ==
Thorp took a break from filming in 2009 due to health issues before returning to filming in March 2010. In 2010 Thorp, commented on his tenure in the show, saying, "I ought to have regrets about staying, but I'm the laziest human being alive so I don't". He added, "there was no point in me moving on because I wasn't good enough!" Thorp went on to bemoan the lack of storylines for Alan: "I would hate to leave, but I wish they'd find more for me to do". He added that he had suggested that "Turner get a love interest" but that the writers had refused, saying "they'd have to dig her up". In 2010, Thorp commented on his role, saying that Emmerdale had been "very good to me and has renewed my contracts for years, but they have not got as much work for me these days – I'm more like the village memorial now than an active character".

== Characterisation ==
Alan used to be an inept, boozing and bullying manager for NY Estates at Home Farm, but has mellowed out over the years and is now an important member of the community. However he still likes to be in charge and has a tendency to be bossy. You're most likely to see him in the Woolpack putting the world to rights.

— itv.com on Alan.

What's on TV profiled Alan as a "boozer and womaniser in his younger years, Alan Turner has mellowed with age and become a stalwart of the community".

== Storylines ==
Alan moved to the Emmerdale village in 1982. Alan and Jill ended their marriage in 1985. Alan spent his early years in the village doing business deals and working on the local council. He worked as an estate manager for NY Estates, having a rival in Joe Sugden (Frazer Hines), who later got his job. Alan finds himself outwitted by NY Estates' gamekeeper Seth Armstrong (Stan Richards) on several occasions.

Alan and Caroline Bates (Diana Davies) start dating when she becomes his secretary at NY Estates in 1984. The couple plan to marry in 1989, but Caroline leaves the village to care for her ailing mother, Alice Wood (Olivia Jardith). Alan becomes landlord of the Woolpack following Amos Brearly's decision to retire in January 1991. Alan married Shirley Foster (Rachel Davies) on 10 February 1994. Four months later, on 7 June 1994, Shirley is shot by Reg Dawson (Niven Boyd) during a siege at Home Farm, and she dies. In 1998, Alan's granddaughter, Tricia Stokes (Sheree Murphy), arrives in the village, and they form a close relationship. Steph, Alan's daughter and Tricia's mother, arrives in the village in 2002. Steph and Alan have several disagreements, but are united by their grief for Tricia after she is killed in a storm.

Alan and Shelley Williams (Carolyn Pickles), Steph's best friend, start dating but Steph is not happy about having a rival for Alan's attention and voices her disapproval but the relationship continued and they began making plans to move to Spain. Steph lies that Shelley only wants Alan's money so Shelley left, leading Alan to begin drinking heavily. Alan and Steph argue on the B&B stairs before Alan falls down them and Steph looks after him but drugs him, leaving him at her mercy, as she plans to sell Alan's business and put him into sheltered accommodation. Alan realises what Steph is doing and manages to tell his neighbours, leading Steph to almost kill them both by driving to a quarry edge. However, she cannot go through with it, and her scheming is revealed.

Shelley disappears, and Steph is suspected of murdering her; Alan accepts that Shelley is dead, only for her to attend the memorial service. Although horrified that Shelley had let Steph go to prison for suspected murder, he forgives her, and they try to rebuild their relationship but Shelley could not cope with Steph being around, and Shelley leaves the village. Steph consequently goes after Shelly to bring her home. On the ferry, Steph and Shelley argue, leading Shelley to fall overboard. Steph leaves her to drown, and returns to the village. Steph's relationship with Alan strengthens, and he allows her to take over the B&B again.

Steph falls in love with local doctor Adam Forsythe (Richard Shelton). Steph tells Alan she was sexually abused by her older brother, Terence, when she was a child. Incensed, Alan dismisses her claims and resumes contact with his estranged son. Alan turns against Steph, Adam and Betty Eagleton (Paula Tilbrook), before moving into Holdgate Farm with Terence.

Soon after this, Terence admits to abusing Steph, so Alan throws Terence out. However, Terence returns to torment Steph, leading to a fight between Terence and Adam, which results in Terence's death. Although Adam takes her on holiday and they get married, the murder weighs on Steph's sanity, upsetting Alan when Adam has her sectioned.

Despite her confessing to playing a part in Terence's murder, Adam tells Alan that Steph's confession is a lie attributable to her state of mind, but Alan feels that Steph is telling the truth. Adam leaves when Steph is released from hospital and Terence's body is found. With Adam gone, Steph is charged with her brother's murder, and Alan is desperate to get Steph out of prison, as he fears she cannot cope.

Steph confesses to Alan that she played a part in Shelley's death and is sentenced to life in prison for the murder of her brother. Following Steph's imprisonment and Terence's cremation, Alan wants answers, and visits Adam in prison. Alan is shocked when Adam's ex-wife Isla (Sarah Griffiths) tells him Adam has hanged himself.

Feeling low, Alan seeks comfort from Betty, clumsily making a pass at her. Alan is embarrassed when she rejects him. In December 2006, Alan decides to visit Kathy Brookman (Malandra Burrows) in Australia and stays there over Christmas. Alan returns to the village, living with Betty and Sandy Thomas (Freddie Jones). In early 2008, Alan visits Kathy again. Upon his return, he shares a kiss with Pearl Ladderbanks (Meg Johnson). David Metcalfe (Matthew Wolfenden) asks Alan to run for the Council in opposition to Eric Pollard (Chris Chittell). Alan has no desire to return to politics, but advises David in his candidacy. David wins, but soon disappoints Alan, due to the lack of attention he gives to his duties.

Alan's friend, Eddy Fox (Paul Darrow), arrives in the village, asking him to go travelling with him. Alan is reluctant to go, but Lily Butterfield (Anne Charleston), goes instead. Alan joins them later, and is away for a period of seven months.

In December 2010, Val Pollard (Charlie Hardwick) asks Alan about the events surrounding Eric's second wife Elizabeth's (Kate Dove) death 17 years earlier, in the plane crash, after her son Michael Feldmann (Matthew Vaughan) accuses Eric of murdering her and covering it up through the crash. Alan tells Val that there had been a lot of suspicion about Eric in the aftermath of the plane crash.

In January 2011, Alan and Betty temporarily move into Mill Cottage after a fire, started by Nick Henshall (Michael McKell), damages their home. Alan and Betty move back in once their house is renovated. For Alan's 76th birthday on 5 August 2011, he is touched by the replacement watch his friends buy him after his stops working.

In March 2012, Alan, having once run Home Farm and been a councillor, has doubts about the village festival planned by Home Farm owner Declan Macey (Jason Merrells) for the summer and raised his concerns to him. At the end of the month, he shares his war experiences with Sean Spencer (Luke Roskell), who is doing a school project. He welcomes fellow housemate Betty home when she returns from her cruise in July.

In July 2013, it is explained that Alan has gone travelling around France with his biker friends. In October, Alan returns (off-screen), but when Betty goes to see him, she finds he has died in his sleep. His funeral is held on 30 October, and Steph returns under police guard to attend. Alan is mentioned in May 2015 when Betty says to Pearl that without Seth or Alan, life in the village would never be the same. In June 2017, Zak visits Alan's grave and tidies it up.

== Reception ==
In 1999, Thomas Quinn of the Daily Mirror felt Alan was deceiving himself thinking he was going to marry Stella (Stephanie Schonfield) as "she's rich and beautiful while he's poor, fat, old and boring". In 2002, Alan was named as one of "The 30 greatest Emmerdale residents" by a writer for Inside Soap. They said "Roly-poly Alan was originally a ruthless businessman hated by all, now he's a cuddly landlord, swapping the boardroom for the bedrooms of the B&B he runs."
