= Steph Stokes =

Fictional character from Emmerdale

- Emmerdale character
- Portrayed by: Lorraine Chase
- Duration: 2002–2006, 2013
- First appearance: 3 September 2002
- Last appearance: 30 October 2013
- Introduced by: Steve Frost (2002); Kate Oates (2013)
In-universe information
- Occupation: Antiques dealer B&B manager
- Father: Alan Turner
- Mother: Jill Turner
- Brothers: Terence Turner
- Husband: Adam Forsythe (2006)
- Daughters: Tricia Dingle

Mary Stephanie "Steph" Stokes (also Turner and Forsythe) is a fictional character from the British ITV soap opera Emmerdale. She was played by Lorraine Chase for a period of four years between 2002 and 2006. It was announced on 12 September 2013 that Steph would return for a guest appearance, which she did on 30 October 2013.

== Development ==
In one storyline Steph accuses her older brother of sexually abusing her. On 9 December 2005, Kris Green from Digital Spy reported that Nick Brimble had been cast as her brother, Terence Turner, and that his arrival would lead to a confrontation. An Emmerdale spokesperson told Green that "Terence is embroiled in a huge storyline from the start".

On 18 July 2006, Green reported that Chase had decided to leave the show. Of her decision to leave, Chase stated "four years ago Steve Frost, our then producer of Emmerdale, presented me with a complex character. I have enjoyed greatly the challenge he set. I hope Steph's fans will agree, she was an unpredictable and intriguing crazy lady and I loved her but there is only so much a good girl can do!" Executive producer Kathleen Beedles revealed that there were plans for a "terrific" final storyline for the character.

A reporter from the ITV Press Centre revealed Emmerdale had planned a funeral storyline for Alan Turner, following the death of actor (Richard Thorp). Chase agreed to make a guest appearance in the episode. Chase said that she was "overjoyed" to return to mark Alan's departure but added that she wished the circumstances had been different.

== Storylines ==
=== 2002–2006 ===
Steph was established as the village bully for her violent and threatening behaviour. An ex-convict, she first appeared at her daughter Tricia's (Sheree Murphy) engagement party in 2002 and hit her fiancé Marlon Dingle (Mark Charnock), and then kissed him the night before the wedding. Marlon wasn't the first of Tricia's boyfriends that Steph had been attracted to. After stealing an earlier boyfriend, she'd not spoken to her daughter in years. Tricia wanted to try again with Steph – especially when she decided to stay in Emmerdale.

Now that she had decided to put down some roots, Steph began working for Rodney Blackstock (Patrick Mower) at the Antiques Barn. Her fantastic selling skills and keen eye for a bargain made Steph indispensable to the business. But when she spotted some priceless porcelain and tried to do a runner to France with it, Rodney caught her and she was forced to abandon her dreams. Despite double-crossing him, Steph and Rodney got close again and even got engaged. But Steph wasn't after Rodney's love and companionship; her one true love was money. When she discovered Rodney was not as flush as she thought, Steph jilted him and moved in with her father Alan (Richard Thorp) at the B&B. A few weeks later, Steph was delighted when her best friend "Fat" Shelley Williams (Carolyn Pickles) arrived. The two women immediately started making plans to open a salon in the village and got Alan to finance their business. By this time, Steph was the co-owner of the local factory with Eric Pollard (Chris Chittell). However, the factory closed and Steph found herself in trouble with the law, following her making counterfeit clothes in the factory. However, relations between Steph and her father hit an all-time low over the next few months.

In 2004, things got even worse when Tricia was killed during the storm at New Year and she plunged into a deep depression. Shelley was a great source of comfort to Steph and Alan as they came to terms with losing Tricia and soon she had begun a relationship with Steph's father. When she discovered what was going on, Steph was absolutely horrified and made it clear she would not accept them as a couple. Alan and Shelley continued to see each other and planned to emigrate to Spain and start a new life together. Faced with being deserted by the two people closest to her and losing her inheritance, Steph planned to split them up by spreading a vicious rumour that Shelley was a gold-digger. Her plot worked and Shelley left Alan. Soon after, during a confrontation on the stairs, Alan declared that he wished Steph had died instead of Tricia, and in a moment of anger, Steph pushed Alan down the stairs. He ended up an invalid and lost his memory, due to the knock on the head. In control of everything, Steph started medicating Alan to keep him manageable and when Shelley came back, Steph locked her in the cellar after pushing her down the stairs and disposed of her at night. However, Alan was aware that Steph was up to no good and knew that Shelley had come to the house. When her treachery was revealed, Steph made an attempt to make a quick sale on the B&B and do a runner. When this failed, she almost drove off the local quarry with her father but had a change of heart at the last moment. The villagers were deeply shocked and so was Steph when she was arrested for Shelley's murder. Steph found herself alienated by the villagers and branded "Psycho Steph". However, it emerged that Steph didn't kill her when she returned to Emmerdale for her memorial service. Steph thought she had killed her, due to her mental illness. Alan and Shelley tried to rekindle their relationship but Alan was unable to grant his partner's wish that he cut all ties with Steph. When Shelley left, Steph followed her and tried to convince her to return to Alan. The two women had a confrontation on a ferry in March 2005 – Steph told Shelley that she was going back to Emmerdale with her and tried to tug her towards her, but in pulling away from Steph, Shelley fell overboard. Making a split second decision, Steph decided not to raise the alarm to rescue Shelley and threw her suitcase overboard.

Life seemed to settle for Steph when she returned from the disastrous ferry journey, keeping quiet about Shelley's death. When new doctor Adam Forsythe (Richard Shelton) arrived to live at the B&B, romance began to blossom. Having fallen in love for the first time, Steph started to open up about her troubled childhood and confessed that her older brother Terence (Nick Brimble) had sexually abused her as a child. She also confessed about her part in Shelley's disappearance but to her surprise, Adam remained calm and silent. Adam convinced Steph that she needed to let her father Alan know about this – especially as he'd since decided to track down his long-lost son. Refusing to believe her, Alan devastated Steph and when Terence arrived in Emmerdale, things got even worse. The violent alcoholic started to terrorise his sister and she began to fall apart – much to Adam's horror. But Terence's reign as Alan's favourite child was about to come to an end when he got drunk and confessed Steph was telling the truth. He left Emmerdale but continued to haunt Steph and Adam. When Adam came home to find Terence in the B&B, a violent struggle ensued and Adam ended up killing Terence with a fire extinguisher in front of Steph and buried the body in the local woods. Steph was absolutely traumatised and, in a bid to keep her quiet, Adam took her away to Barbados.

When they got back, Alan was stunned to hear Steph and Adam had got married abroad. However, there was no domestic bliss in this household. Steph discovered Adam was drugging her to keep her under control and decided enough was enough. She decided to confess to Alan that she murdered Terence and even took him to the place they buried him. However, when they got there, Steph was horrified to realise that Adam had moved the body and was now claiming she was mentally ill. The relationship fell apart as Steph realised she'd married a cold, calculating man who was determined to keep her in line. Her outrage at him saw her sectioned and it seemed like Steph's had a long way to go before she could persuade everyone she was telling the truth this time. However, with Alan and family friend Betty Eagleton (Paula Tilbrook) on her side, and skeptical about Adam, it looked as if Steph had at least two allies. It was further revealed that prior to Terence's death, he was blackmailing Adam as Adam was struck off the register, yet still practicing as a doctor illegally.

When Terence's body was discovered under the rubble of the Kings Show Home, Steph was arrested for his murder. Through the trial, Steph contested her innocence, but in a shock twist, Shelley's suitcase was found on the day before the verdict. Steph knew that there was no way they would start a new trial against her, following the last time she was wrongly accused of her murder, but in a bid of loyalty to her dad, she instead confessed to Terence's murder in a bid to see some sort of justice. Steph was sentenced to life imprisonment when she confessed that she and Adam murdered her brother, Terence, even though it was only Adam who killed him. Adam would face further investigation about the case, but two days later, he hanged himself and subsequently died in his cell. At the end of it all, Alan was proud of Steph and therefore she was finally happy in her comeuppance.

=== 2013 ===
Steph is allowed compassionate day release to attend her father's funeral on 30 October 2013, escorted by a prison warden. She immediately disapproves of Marlon's relationship with Laurel Thomas (Charlotte Bellamy) and when Amy Wyatt (Chelsea Halfpenny) asks Val Pollard (Charlie Hardwick) why she is handcuffed to the warden, Val tells her about Steph's involvement in her brother's murder. Steph also annoys Victoria Sugden (Isabel Hodgins) while the service takes place. Later at Alan's wake at Home Farm, Steph persuades the warden to unlock her handcuffs so that she can make a speech about her father. The warden does so and Steph makes her speech, but breaks down halfway through and runs out of the function room. Later, Val and the warden are unable to find her and realize that she has escaped and call the police. While walking through the cemetery, Marlon and Laurel find Steph at her father's graveside. Steph tells them that she misses her father and that she has nobody left. The warden arrives and handcuffs Steph and she expresses how happy she is for Marlon and Laurel and asks Marlon if he will write to her in the future while she is in prison. Steph is then led to a waiting police car to be returned to prison.

== Reception ==
For her portrayal of Steph, Chase was nominated for "Best Bitch" at The British Soap Awards 2007. Chase was nominated for the same award at the 2007 Inside Soap Awards. In 2017, a writer from Inside Soap reflected on the character, writing, "Lorraine Chase created one of Emmerdale's most entertaining villainesses – they should bring her back, pronto!" In 2025, a writer from the same magazine called Steph "glorious" and a "Villainess", opining that Steph's 2006 exit was "sad" and speculating that she would quickly become the "Top Dog" in prison.
