= Diane Sugden =

Fictional character from Emmerdale

- Emmerdale character
- Portrayed by: Elizabeth Estensen
- Duration: 1999–2022
- First appearance: Episode 2611; 23 November 1999
- Last appearance: Episode 9500; 20 October 2022
- Introduced by: Kieran Roberts (1999); Jane Hudson (2022)
In-universe information
- Other names: Diane Blackstock
- Occupation: Barmaid; Pub landlady; Businesswoman
- Sisters: Val Pollard
- Husband: Rodney Blackstock (backstory); Jack Sugden (2004–2009)
- Daughters: Bernice Blackstock
- Stepsons: Robert Sugden; Andy Sugden
- Stepdaughters: Victoria Sugden
- Granddaughters: Gabby Thomas; Dee Dee
- Nephews: Paul Lambert
- Nieces: Sharon Lambert
- Other relatives: Thomas Tate

Diane Sugden (also Blackstock) is a fictional character from the British soap opera Emmerdale, played by Elizabeth Estensen. Since her first appearance in 1999, she has been involved in several high-profile storylines, including her marriage to Jack Sugden (Clive Hornby) and his subsequent death, a battle with colon cancer, the revelation that her ex-husband Rodney Blackstock (Patrick Mower) fathered her sister Val Lambert's (Charlie Hardwick) son, being held hostage in a siege at the Woolpack, sleeping with Val's husband Eric Pollard (Chris Chittell), being involved in a helicopter crash which kills Val, being stabbed by Chas Dingle (Lucy Pargeter), and a feud with Chrissie White (Louise Marwood) after Chrissie pulled a sick stunt by destroying Andy to set up him for attempted murder and setting him to the path to ruin. In September 2021, it was announced that Estensen had made the decision to take a break from acting and her initial final appearance as Diane aired on 29 October 2021. However, the following year, Estensen returned to the role of Diane for a guest stint from 12 to 20 October 2022 to celebrate Emmerdale's 50th anniversary.

== Storylines ==
Diane raised her daughter Bernice Blackstock (Samantha Giles) alone after her husband Rodney Blackstock (Patrick Mower) left her. Diane struggled to raise Bernice alone, and by her own admission was a far from perfect mother. However, Diane cares deeply for her daughter, and is a key source of support when Bernice's engagement to Gavin Ferris (Robert Beck) collapses. After initially only coming to Emmerdale to attend Bernice's wedding, Diane decides to stay and take Gavin's place as Bernice's business partner, with the two buying The Woolpack together.

Diane offers comfort to Jack Sugden who has been through difficult times, following his discovery that his former wife, Sarah Sugden (Alyson Spiro), has cheated on him. They kiss but decide to be friends. They remain close for a number of years. Rodney reappears in Diane and Bernice's lives after abandoning them. Bernice forgives Rodney but Diane is more hesitant. There is still a spark between Diane and Rodney and the two spend a night together but Diane calls things off. After failed relationships with builder Jerry "Mack" MacKinley (Rob Dixon) and Alan Turner (Richard Thorp), Diane and Jack reunite and started considering life together. When Diane decides to join Bernice in Brighton, Jack proposes in an attempt to get her to stay.

Diane is horrified to discover she has colon cancer. She goes to a funeral in Scarborough with Rodney, trying to come to terms with the news. Rodney does not know about her illness and Val assumes they are having an affair. Upon finding out Diane is ill, Rodney ends things with Val, begging Diane to give their relationship another chance. However, she rejects him and soon begins planning her wedding to Jack. They marry on 21 September 2004, when Jack's daughter Victoria Sugden tells the congregation about Diane's cancer illness. After the ceremony, Diane's younger sister Val Lambert (Charlie Hardwick) tells Rodney that he fathered her son, Paul Lambert (Mathew Bose). Horrified by Val's selfishness, Diane disowns her. She is given the all-clear from cancer early in the New Year.

Diane struggles to cope with Jack's children, at the detriment to her health. She becomes a victim of the Kings River Showhome explosion, but makes a full recovery (albeit with a "Live for the Moment" outlook on life). Diane falls for Billy Hopwood (David Crellin) and they begin an emotional affair. She and Jack try to work through their problems but end up separating. However they grew closer following Andy's conviction for manslaughter and whilst Jack was in Spain, Diane received a text mentioning patching things up on his return. While Jack is away, Diane takes over looking after the family and rebuilds bridges. She is appalled when Andy is discovered to be beating his ex-wife, Jo but helps him when he suffers a breakdown. Diane is devastated when Jack dies in February 2009. She is comforted by a letter he had written before his death, letting her know how much he loved her.

Diane tries to move on with her life, but struggles. Val, after receiving an offer for the pub from Maisie Wylde (Alice Coulthard), tries to convince Diane she is too depressed to stay on as owner and should sell up. When Diane learns of Val's scheme, she shocks her by pretending she plans to sell to Rodney and Nicola. She then chased Val out of the pub with a water squirter. Sandy Thomas (Freddie Jones), who constantly argues with his son Ashley Thomas (John Middleton), asks if he can move into The Woolpack and Diane agrees. Douglas Potts (Duncan Preston) helps Sandy move in, and after a few drinks, Diane impulsively kisses him. She realises she needs to sort herself out, and leaves to visit Bernice, Louise Appleton (Emily Symons) and Paul, respectively. On her return she discovers Daz has left, and Andy has given custody of his daughter Sarah to Debbie Dingle (Charley Webb) and is on the verge of a breakdown. Following another fall out with her Val, Diane realises that they can no longer work together and she uses the inheritance left to her by Jack to buy Val out, making her the sole owner of The Woolpack Inn.

Charlie Haynes (George Costigan), an old friend of Rodney's, wins Diane's heart. Their relationship gets off to a good start, and Charlie whisks Diane away on romantic holidays, and away to France, even taking Victoria along so she can brush up on her French. On this trip Diane opens up to Charlie and tells him about her cancer. However, their happiness comes to a halt as Charlie reveals to Diane he was suffering from an inoperable brain tumour, meaning he will die and does not have long left. Making the most of their time left, Charlie and Diane decide to move to France, with Diane deciding to sell The Woolpack. On the night of her leaving party, Charlie leaves to inform his daughter of his illness. The next day, a worried Rodney phones the hospital, only to find there are no records of Charlie or his doctor ever being at the hospital, and Rodney and Doug find Charlie's shop had never been used. Diane and Val go to France, only to find the Charlie's chateau is in fact, someone else's and the owner has never heard of Charlie. Diane then realises she has been conned and is left devastated. Val then comforts Diane as she bursts into tears.

Doug offers Diane his life savings, which she tearfully accepts, much to the annoyance of Doug's daughter, Laurel, who then goes on to warn Diane it is only a loan, and she must pay Doug back as soon as she can. Diane hopes that she may now have a future for Doug, but he reconciles with estranged wife, Hilary (Paula Wilcox), and leaves in early 2011 to travel the world with her, leaving Diane once again heartbroken. The following year, Diane tries to sell the pub, wanting a fresh start and finding it an increasing struggle running the place on her own, but unable to find a buyer for the whole business, she settles for Chas Dingle (Lucy Pargeter) buying a stake in the Woolpack and becoming her new business partner. Diane and Chas' friendship and partnership becomes strained in 2012 after the revelation of Chas' affair with Cameron Murray (Dominic Power). Diane is touched when Andy and Debbie name their newborn son after Jack. Bernice returns before Christmas after her marriage falls apart and Diane departs shortly after Bernice returns and travels to Brighton to look after her daughter, Dee-Dee. Diane returns in early June, to say she wants to go live with Dee-Dee in Brisbane, and wants to sell her share on The Woolpack. In October 2013, Diane, along with many other villagers including Bernice and Nicola, is held hostage in The Woolpack by Cameron, who has escaped from prison. He orders for Diane to look out of the window, but she shouts to help, so he pulls her away, causing her to fall over and hit her head on a table. She sustains a cut to the head, and is later released by Cameron.

Diane has sex with Eric Pollard (Chris Chittell), Val's husband. Victoria reveals that Val is HIV positive. Diane goes to a clinic that day, lying that she has been exposed to HIV post exposure treatment to combat the virus. Diane later reveals the truth and Val humiliates the pair by revealing their one-night stand. In August 2015, Diane is furious when she hears that Val is planning to fake her own death to escape a prison sentence, and refuses to talk to her. In an attempt to make the pair reconcile, Eric, Rodney and Doug lock Val and Diane in a hall of mirrors so that they have no choice but talk to one another. However, after arguing continually, they are spooked when they lose light in the hall of mirrors, after a helicopter crash caused by Chrissie White (Louise Marwood). Soon after, an explosion rips through the village as a result of the helicopter crash, reaching the hall of mirrors and trapping Val and Diane. They repair their relationship before firefighters arrive, where Val insists that Diane is rescued first. Val dies when a large shard of glass falls and impales her. Diane's overwhelming grief is met with further devastation when Eric bans her from her sister's funeral.

After Robert is shot in the village, Chas and Diane fall out as Diane believes that Chas' son Aaron Livesy (Danny Miller), is the culprit. Their feud results in Diane briefly moving in with Doug. Chas begins sleepwalking and trashes the pub at night due to the stress of watching Robert being shot. Chas believes Emma Barton (Gillian Kearney) is responsible. One night when Diane returns from a meal with her family, she accidentally knocks over a glass, which causes Chas to think that Emma has broken in. Chas grabs a knife and stabs Diane, leaving her bleeding on the floor while she calls Aaron and Cain Dingle (Jeff Hordley). Diane is rushed to hospital and Chas hands herself in to the police for stabbing Diane. However, after being treated for the stab wounds, Diane is informed by a doctor that they have discovered abnormalities in her stomach, and later reveal that Diane has stomach cancer.

This causes Diane to re-evaluate her life and she sells her share of the pub. Diane and Doug buy a share of The Grange B&B, becoming partners with Eric. Diane meets and bonds with Aaron's father Gordon Livesy (Gary Mavers) during her chemotherapy sessions. Diane supports Gordon when he re-enters Chas and Aaron's life, but it soon emerges that Gordon sexually abused Aaron when he was young. Diane apologises to Chas for letting Gordon back into her and Aaron's lives. A couple weeks later, Diane is called away to look after Annie in Spain after she falls ill, and she leaves Doug to handle the B&B. The following month, it is revealed that Diane sold her share of the pub to Charity Dingle (Emma Atkins), but is unaware that Charity does not have the money to officially buy the share, and that she still owes her and Doug the money. After returning from Spain, Diane and Doug decide to rent Brook Cottage, as The Woolpack is full. Bernice joins them after the breakdown of her marriage to Lawrence White (John Bowe).

Diane learns that Chrissie fitted Andy up for the attempted murder of her father Lawrence, knowing it was her son Lachlan White (Thomas Atkinson) who shot Lawrence. Furthermore, she is shocked to discover that Robert, Bernice, Victoria and Aaron all knew what the Whites had done, and that Robert had joined forces with Lawrence's other daughter, Rebecca White (Emily Head) to seek revenge on Chrissie. Diane throws a brick through the Home Farm window, resulting in Chrissie phoning the police and Diane being cautioned. However, before the police are called, Chrissie serves Diane, Doug and Bernice an eviction notice for Brook Cottage but after the police caution, Lawrence revokes the eviction notice. However, Diane decides to confront Lachlan, and when he insults Andy, Diane slaps him. The following day, Diane confronts Chrissie at Home Farm, and when she continues to refuse to listen to her, Diane threatens Chrissie with Lawrence's shotgun, which Lachlan films on his mobile phone to show the police. However, Chrissie informs Diane that she believes that Lachlan is dangerous and wanted to kill the family on purpose, upsetting Lachlan and ending her feud with Diane.

== Development ==
The character was introduced in November 1999 as the mother of established regular Bernice Blackstock (Samantha Giles). Actress Elizabeth Estensen described Diane as "a tart with a heart", and stated "Diane likes a good time, is kind-hearted and easy to get on with." Diane immediately flirts with Alan Turner (Richard Thorp) and Eric Pollard (Chris Chittell), leading Estensen to point out that "there's no doubt that she likes male company." Estensen was not a fan of her character's style, which initially consisted of high heels and tight clothing. Estensen also had to wear a blonde wig for the role. She called Diane "more flamboyant than Bernice".

Producers established a friendship between Diane and Jack Sugden (Clive Hornby) amidst his marriage breakdown and custody battle. Estensen said Diane initially visits Jack to offer moral support. She continued "They've been talking, she's enjoying his company, and then one evening, one thing leads to another and they spend the night together." Diane is disappointed to learn that Jack only thinks of their night together as a comfort during his marital problems. Estensen told an Inside Soap writer that Diane is attracted to Jack, but he wants to make sure that no one finds out what happened between them. As Diane "honourably" promises to keep their night to herself, Estensen said that it actually brings the pair closer together as friends. She also said that she was initially concerned when she learned of the storyline, as she thought that viewers would be put off by people of Jack and Diane's age kissing and having sex. But she found that the plot was "absolutely fine in the end" and Hornby was "terribly nice" during filming. The plot starts a three-year on/off romance between the characters, which culminates in their marriage in September 2004.

Estensen thought Jack and Diane made "a good team because they're such an unlikely couple, and with that, they kind of complement one another." She told Andy Baker of Inside Soap that Diane does not fit the stereotype of a farmer's wife, but Jack is "her rock" and is always there for her, unlike her former husband Rodney Blackstock (Patrick Mower). In the lead up to the wedding, Diane is secretly battling bowel cancer and Rodney confesses his love for her, leading to an argument with her sister Val Lambert (Charlie Hardwick). Discussing their dynamic, Estensen said "The history of the Diane/Val relationship is that Val has always been a thorn in the flesh of Diane – however, she does love her as she's her sister." The argument leads Val to admit that Rodney fathered her son Paul Lambert (Mathew Bose), meaning they had an affair while Diane and Rodney were married. Estensen called it "a massive shock" and told Baker that a lot of implications rush into her head. She branded the Blackstock family "completely incestuous", as Bernice is Paul's cousin and sister, and Rodney's daughter Nicola Blackstock (Nicola Wheeler) now has a half-brother.

Shortly before the ceremony, Diane has a talk with her future step-daughter Victoria Sugden (Hannah Midgley) about Paul and her cancer diagnosis, which brings them closer together. Diane then marries Jack in front of their family and friends. During the ceremony, Victoria reveals Diane's cancer diagnosis to the congregation, and Estensen said Diane is "shocked and thrilled, it doesn't seem a problem. It's just very emotional." The wedding episode was filmed during a spell of bad weather, so most of the outdoor scenes were cancelled and the cast had to shoot additional interior scenes. Estensen hoped that Jack and Diane would stay faithful, as Diane had been messed around by men all her life. She stated that Diane had finally found someone who she really cares about and she did not want to think that either of them would have an affair within weeks of the wedding. She added "It took so long to get here that it would be wrong to throw it away."

On 17 September 2021, it was announced that Estensen had made the decision to take a break from acting. It was confirmed that she had already filmed her final scenes as Diane prior to the announcement. Speaking on her decision to take a break and depart from the role, she commented: "For the past 22 years I have loved playing Diane Sugden. She's kind, reliable and fiercely loyal. However, I now feel the time has come to say goodbye. Emmerdale will always remain special to me. I've been treated with respect and kindness and I've had the very best friends and colleagues, both past and present. I’ll miss everyone dearly." However, under a year later, it was announced that Estensen would reprise her role as Diane for a guest stint in October 2022, as part of Emmerdale's 50th anniversary celebrations.
