= Terence Turner =

Fictional character from Emmerdale

- Emmerdale character
- Stephen Marchant as Terence Turner
- Portrayed by: Stephen Marchant (1985); Nick Brimble (2006)
- Duration: 1985, 2006
- First appearance: 30 April 1985
- Last appearance: 21 May 2006
- Introduced by: Richard Handford (1985); Kathleen Beedles (2006)
In-universe information
- Father: Alan Turner
- Mother: Jill Turner
- Sisters: Steph Stokes
- Wife: Janice Turner
- Nieces: Tricia Dingle

Terence Turner is a fictional character from the British television soap opera Emmerdale, played by actors Stephen Marchant and Nick Brimble.

== Development ==
Actor Stephen Marchant debuted on-screen as Terence in April 1985. His introduction storyline sees Terence arriving to stay with his father, Alan Turner (Richard Thorp). Terence is characterised as "arrogant and lazy" and views himself as "too sophisticated" for a farming career. Linda Hawkins, author of Emmerdale Farm: Celebration Edition 1000 Episodes described him as Alan's "unpleasant son" and that despite his arrogance, "Terence can nevertheless be amusing when he wishes".

In contrast to these personality traits, Terence is academic and studies agriculture at the University of Oxford. His dislike of farming forces Terence to conjure up alternative ways of securing an income. His money making schemes include selling fake home-made lime pickle and hosting rock climbing. He also attempts to set up a dry ski slope business venture. The divisive character caused Marchant to receive abuse from viewers. He told Hawkins that while in a Boots chemist, a female viewer approached him shouting "I hate you".

Writers created a romance storyline between Terence and Sandie Merrick (Jane Hutcheson). Their relationship is met with disapproval from the Sugden family. Sandie views Terence as different to the other men in Beckindale because he is "smooth, cynical with a dry sense of humour". Sandie did not fall in love with Terence but continued their romance to rebel against her family. Her stepfather Jack Sugden (Clive Hornby) "loathed" Terence because he was Alan's son. Her mother could not understand why she would date a "layabout" and Dolly Skilbeck (Jean Rogers) voices her outrage over Terence's involvement in a crop spraying incident. Sandie grows tired of the Sugden's interfering and vows to continue dating Terence.

On 9 December 2005, It was announced that Terence would be returning to the serial, with Nick Brimble taking over the role.

== Storylines ==
He first appeared in 1985 when he was a student at Oxford University and had a brief romance with Sandie. It was stated in the show that the character was 20 years old in 1984, meaning he was born in 1964.

When Terence returned to the village in 2006, attempting to con his father out of £20,000, his age had been substantially altered and his birth year was stated as being 1951. Terence's sister, Steph Stokes (Lorraine Chase), revealed that he sexually abused her when they were teenagers. Alan refused to believe Steph, thinking she was trying to cause trouble because she was jealous. He moved into Holdgate Farm with Terence and one night Terence got really drunk and admitted that Steph was telling the truth. Alan and Terence had a fight and Alan lost. Terence took Alan's money and escaped, while Steph and her husband Adam Forsythe (Richard Shelton) found Alan.

Terence was away for a while but returned after Adam started receiving weird phone calls. Terence told Adam he had delved into his past and found out he had hit a young boy, losing his doctor's license. It was revealed Adam was practising illegally using his late father's registration. Terence demanded £50,000 from Adam in exchange for not going to the police. Adam got the money and Terence came to collect it from the B&B, but wanted more. Adam offered him drugs to sell but Adam took some ether and stunned Terence. He then dragged Terence to the basement and went back up. Then Steph came home, worrying about Adam because he hadn't called her. Terence woke up, while Adam and Steph were in the house. Terence fought with Adam and Steph and Adam bludgeoned Terence over the head and killed him. Adam and Steph buried Terence in the woods and tried to make sure that no one knew about it. However, Steph was uncomfortable about lying about Terence's disappearance so Adam started drugging her to keep her quiet and she was later sectioned as it was suspected that she was having a nervous breakdown. Eventually the truth came out when Steph admitted it in court, leading to her and Adam being arrested for Terence's murder.
