= Stephen Marchant =

Stephen Marchant may refer to:

- Stephen Marchant (ornithologist), Australian ornithologist
- Stephen Marchant (actor), English actor

== See also ==
- Stephen Merchant, English comedian, writer, director, and actor
