= Bluebell (TV series) =

- Written by: Paul Wheeler
- Directed by: Moira Armstrong
- Starring: Carolyn Pickles
- Country of origin: United Kingdom
- Original language: English
- No. of series: 1
- No. of episodes: 8

Production
- Producer: Brian Spilby
- Running time: 50 min

Original release
- Network: BBC1
- Release: 12 January – 2 March 1986

Bluebell is a British six-part television biographical drama serial broadcast by the BBC in 1986. Produced by Richard Bates, the 8-part series was based on the life of Margaret Kelly, played by Carolyn Pickles, founder of a dance group called the Bluebell Girls, The series was set before and during the Second World War as the Bluebell Girls performed across Europe.

== Cast ==
- Carolyn Pickles as Margaret Kelly
- Annie Lambert as Helen
- Philip Sayer as Marcel Leibovici
- Michael Harbour as Paul Derval
- Carmel McSharry as Aunt Mary
