= Anthony Newlands =

British actor (1925–1995)

Portrait by Vivienne (late 1950s)

Anthony Newlands (31 January 1925, London – 6 October 1995), was a British actor, born Raymond Gordon Newland.

His parents were Lilian Elizabeth (née Manning) and Frederick Stanley. Newland had two sisters: Jean Lillian Newland (born 24 January 1932) and Marion Frances Newland (born 24 July 1935).

Newland was obliged to use Newlands as a stage name as there was another Anthony Newland acting at the time. He was best known for his supporting guest roles in British television series of the 1960s, including two roles in ABC Weekend's adventure drama The Avengers and a role in the ITC Entertainment series Danger Man. He also appeared in several television dramas and big screen films, including The Diary of Samuel Pepys (1958) and Cannon's Mata Hari (1985). He also played the President of the Court on Crime of Passion from 1970 to 1973.

== Filmography ==
1960	Maigret	Step-son	Notes
1959	Room at the Top	Bernard	
1959	Beyond This Place	Dunn	
1960	The Trials of Oscar Wilde	First Clerk of Arraigns	
1960	Cone of Silence	Controller #2	
1960	Foxhole in Cairo	S.S. Colonel	
1961	The Fourth Square	Tom Alvarez	
1962	Solo for Sparrow	Reynolds	
1962	Edgar Wallace Mysteries Episode: "The £20,000 Kiss"	Leo Hagen	
1962	The Saint Episode: The Charitable Countess	Father Bellini	
1965	Hysteria	Dr. Keller	
1966	Circus of Fear	Barberini	
1966	Kaleidoscope	Leeds	
1968	The Magus	Party Host	
1969	Vendetta for the Saint	The Doctor	
1970	Scream and Scream Again	Ludwig	
1970	Crime of Passion (UK TV series)	Presiding Judge	
1971	Universal Soldier	Petrakis	
1971	Doomwatch Episode: The Web of Fear	Dr. George	
1985	Mata Hari	Baron Joubert	
