= The £20,000 Kiss =

1962 British film by John Moxey

- Theatrical release poster
- Directed by: John Moxey
- Screenplay by: Philip Mackie
- Based on: a story by Edgar Wallace
- Produced by: Jack Greenwood
- Starring: Dawn Addams; Michael Goodliffe; Richard Thorp
- Cinematography: James Wilson
- Edited by: Gordon Hales
- Production company: Merton Park Studios
- Distributed by: Anglo-Amalgamated
- Release date: 1962
- Running time: 55 minutes
- Country: United Kingdom
- Language: English

The £20,000 Kiss is a 1962 British film directed by John Moxey and starring Dawn Addams, Michael Goodliffe and Richard Thorp. Part of the series of Edgar Wallace Mysteries films made at Merton Park Studios, it is based on a story by Wallace.

== Plot ==
In a moment of passion Sir Harold Trevitt kisses Maxine, the wife of his neighbour. Maxine’s maid Paula sees them and blackmails her. Trevitt pays up, and hires private detective John Durran. With the intention of frightening Paula, Trevitt goes to her armed with a duelling pistol, but finds her already dead. Durran investigates as a complex tale unfolds.

== Cast ==
- Dawn Addams as Maxine Hagen
- Michael Goodliffe as Sir Harold Trevitt
- Richard Thorp as John Durran
- Anthony Newlands as Leo Hagen
- Alfred Burke as Inspector Waveney
- Mia Karam as Paula Blair
- Ellen McIntosh as Ursula Clandon
- Paul Whitsun-Jones as Charles Pinder
- Noël Hood as Lady Clandon
- John Miller as Lord Clandon
- Vincent Harding as Det. Sgt. Holt
- Susan Denny as Susie
- Joyce Henson as landlady
- Bill Williams as valet
- John Dunbar as clerk
- Soong Ling as barmaid
- Garard Green as Ronnie

== Critical reception ==
The Monthly Film Bulletin wrote: "Unlike most of the Edgar Wallace series, this opens simply enough, but once the story gets into its stride, complication piles upon complication bewilderingly, until one begins to wonder who is blackmailing whom, or who has possession of which duelling pistol. The film ends with the customary surprise twist; it is all very complicated, but compels one to watch."
