= Eric Pollard =

Fictional character from Emmerdale

- Emmerdale character
- Portrayed by: Chris Chittell
- Duration: 1986–present
- First appearance: Episode 1088; 30 September 1986
- Introduced by: Keith Richardson
- Spin-off appearances: First Dates for Children in Need (2021)
- Crossover appearances: Corriedale (2026)
In-universe information
- Occupation: Auctioneer; businessman; chef
- Wife: Eileen Pollock (until 1994); Elizabeth Feldmann (1992–1993; void); Dee de la Cruz (1997–2001); Gloria Weaver (2002–2003); Val Lambert (2008–2015); Kerry Wyatt (2025–present)
- Sons: Edward Pollock; David Metcalfe
- Daughters: Amy Wyatt (foster)
- Stepsons: Paul Lambert (2008-15)
- Stepdaughters: Sharon Lambert (2008-15); Chloe Harris (2025-)
- Grandsons: Theo Metcalfe; Jacob Gallagher (adoptive)
- Granddaughters: Amba Metcalfe
- Other relatives: Leyla Sugden (adoptive)

Eric Pollard is a fictional character from the British ITV soap opera Emmerdale, played by Chris Chittell. He made his first appearance in the soap on 30 September 1986. Having appeared continuously since, he is currently the longest-serving actor and the longest-serving character in the history of the soap. The character originally served as the show's villain, but this has been noticeably toned down in recent years, particularly since Eric's marriage to Val Lambert (Charlie Hardwick) and the introduction of his long-lost son, David Metcalfe (Matthew Wolfenden).

Originally introduced for a 12 episode stint, Eric became a popular character amongst viewers for his villainous ways and mistreatment of others, and was promoted to a regular character. He has been married six times: to Eileen Pollock (Arbel Jones) in 1964; Elizabeth Feldmann (Kate Dove) in 1992, although the marriage was bigamous; Dee de la Cruz (Claudia Malkovich) in 1997; Gloria Weaver (Janice McKenzie) in 2002; Val in 2008; and Kerry Wyatt (Laura Norton) in 2025.

== Casting and characterisation ==
After appearing in 12 episodes, Chittell's character was promoted to part of the regular cast. Chittell described Eric as "a bit of a rat", but explained that "he does have a soft underbelly that he shows from time to time". He also explained that he will sometimes watch Emmerdale to see what is being transmitted, and when he watches, Eric "has [him] peeing myself with laughter", adding that he still finds his character "hilarious". He added that he feels "very fondly" to his character, since he is "always up to something". Chittell opined in 2012 that he would hate if the producers "mellowed" Eric or made him "soft", since he always wants his character to have "that edge". He added that "there's life in the old dog yet", and expressed his joy at portraying exciting arcs for Eric.

In 2017, Chittell admitted that despite his long-running tenure on the soap, if his storylines were to decrease in quality, he would leave. He explained that he could imagine Eric becoming less used 5–10 years in the future, and that although he would hate leaving, he would "just shake everyone's hand and say thank you very much, as the journey has been wonderful." Chittell stated that Eric is "capable of anything", and that he "could go to desperate lengths to silence" people talking about his secrets. Eric's profile on the ITV website states that Eric garnered a reputation as "the local crook", but noted that his marriage to Val "has seen him mellow". Despite this, it stated that Eric is still "no-one's pushover", and "can still be underhand if the situation demands it". He is described as a "charming, cunning, prudent, funny, fair judgement of character and situations", and it is noted that he enjoys "making money, enjoying the finer things in life and his wife Valerie", and dislikes "being conned". The profile adds that if Eric had one wish, it would be "for Val to be content with their income and position, to retire comfortably and have an easy life".

== Development ==
=== Grief ===
After Val dies, Eric takes a while to process her death. He "insists on holing himself up in his house", and when it comes to Christmas, he does not want to celebrate with any of his family members. To explore his grief, Emmerdale produced a one-hour special episode which featured Eric as a version of Ebenezer Scrooge, and the episode took on the format of the Charles Dickens 1843 book A Christmas Carol. Explaining the plot, Chittell stated that Eric wants the festive season "over and done with", and that his character "thinks that it's a waste of time and a waste of energy". He praised the producers for using the Dickens plot in the episode, describing it as "beautifully done" and "really, really clever". He went on to admit that he believes Eric "has to move on now", and accept the love he is receiving from friends and family members. For the story, Chittell grew out both his hair and facial hair to give Eric a "very unkempt" look, and recalled shaving it off immediately after the filming of the storyline concluded.

== Storylines ==
Eric arrives in Beckindale (later Emmerdale), and immediately annoys Sandie Merrick (Jane Hutcheson). He makes himself very unpopular, and is involved in a number of illegal schemes, often with his crooked business associate, Charlie Aindow (David Fleeshman). Sandie finds that he is fiddling the accounts at Hotten Market, and he loses his position as manager. He befriends Marian Rosettii (Debbie Blyth) and her husband Paolo (Carl Forgione), and tries to burgle their house, and Paolo chases him. Paolo accidentally shoots himself with a gun, but never discovers it was Eric who was the thief. Once Eric finds out Paolo had been taken to hospital after being shot, he leaves Beckindale for a few months. Upon his return, Eric applies for his old job as an auctioneer but loses out to Sandie, starting another feud. Eric finds romance with Debbie Wilson (Debbie Arnold) and they soon become engaged. However, Debbie leaves with £2,000 and valuable goods that Eric gave to her to start an antiques shop, to which he intended to divert goods from Hotten Market.

Following Debbie's departure, he and Elizabeth Feldmann (Kate Dove) started dating. The relationship surprises many in the village, as two years before, Eric bought the Feldmanns' farm at a reduced price. Elizabeth's son, Michael (Matthew Vaughan) is particularly upset, but Elizabeth ignores him and accepts Eric's proposal. However, the marriage soon turns sour, and when Elizabeth discovers Eric has committed cheque fraud and framed Michael for it, she tells him that she plans to go to the police. He threatens Elizabeth to keep quiet, but a determined Elizabeth leaves the house, and Eric follows her. Moments later, a plane crashes into Beckindale, and Elizabeth is killed along with several other local residents. Michael becomes convinced that Eric is responsible for her death, and becomes determined to prove it. However, after knocking Eric out during a heated argument, Michael panics. Thinking he has killed him, Michael leaves the village.

Meanwhile, Eric's first wife Eileen Pollock (Arbel Jones) comes to Emmerdale as she learns about Elizabeth's death, and threatens to expose Eric as a bigamist. Knowing this would cost him Elizabeth's estate, Eric agrees to pay Eileen in return for a divorce and her silence. Despite his reputation for dodgy business deals, including a dramatic heist in November 1994, Eric persuades Kathy Glover (Malandra Burrows) to go into business with him and turns her tea rooms into a wine bar at night. When he goes on holiday to the Philippines for Christmas 1996, Eric shocks everyone by returning with a young fiancée, Dee de la Cruz (Claudia Malkovich). She and Eric get married, despite a backlash when Rachel Hughes (Glenda McKay) discovers that Dee is a "mail-order bride". Dee is surprisingly keen to make the marriage work, convincing Eric that they should put their energy into the business, but Dee later decides to go home, leaving Eric suicidal, but Marlon Dingle (Mark Charnock) helps Eric to recover from his heartbreak. Eric meets Gloria Weaver (Janice McKenzie), who pushes him to become mayor, and on their wedding night, she insists he spend the night with a councillor to secure her nomination. When the scandal breaks, thanks to Steph Forsythe (Lorraine Chase), Gloria twists it so she looks like the wronged wife and takes the job, despite the fact it is in Westminster. He throws her out, and later becomes convinced that she is dead, until a few months later, when he gets a video of her sipping a cocktail in the sun, revealing that she faked her death in order to clean out his bank account undetected.

After many disastrous marriages and relationships, Eric finally meets his match in troublemaker Val Lambert (Charlie Hardwick). The pair go into business together, and their romance flourishes. David Metcalfe (Matthew Wolfenden) arrives in the village, looking for Eric as his late mother has informed him that Eric is his father. Eric did not know that David existed, and secretly conducts a DNA test which suggests David is not his son, but the test is later confirmed to be faulty. A second test confirms that Eric is David's biological father. David and his girlfriend Delilah Dingle (Hayley Tamaddon) secretly embezzle £20,000 from Eric, reclaiming money Eric stole from Lydia. After Eric discovers David's scheme, they agree to put the past behind them. Eric and Val marry in a surprise ceremony; Eric cannot afford the wedding Val wants, so he convinces her family to go along with a surprise wedding. After their marriage, Eric sinks deeper and deeper into debt, even asking David to borrow money from Val. When Val finally learns about his problems, she sells the factory to the Kings.

Eric receives letters, messages and cards, apparently from his dead wife, Elizabeth. Amy Wyatt (Chelsea Halfpenny), Eric and Val's foster daughter, is the original suspect, but the culprit is revealed to be Elizabeth's son, Michael. Michael, who had been to jail repeatedly, confronts Eric at Elizabeth's grave, and follows him back to the Grange, the B&B that Eric co-owns with Diane Sugden (Elizabeth Estensen). He threatens to tell Val about his past; he leaves initially, but later tells Amy that he is demanding Eric pay him a lot of money or he will reveal Eric is a murderer. Eric produces a tyre iron and threatens Michael; when Michael returns to confront Eric again, Val tells him that the coroner's report states that Elizabeth was killed by falling debris. Val tells Michael that it is time to stop blaming Eric. He agrees and after a calm discussion, Eric persuades Michael to take the money he asked for and use it to start again. Michael then leaves the village.

Eric begins drinking heavily and gets frustrated with the guests staying at the Grange, and Val takes some time away from the village. Amy tries hard to keep running the B&B, but Eric argues with a guest who is celebrating their birthday and they get a bad review. Diane tells Eric and Amy that Val may not return, and that she has also emptied their bank account. After weeks of hoping Eric will come to his senses, Amy snaps and stands up to him, but he sacks her. After a long discussion with Amy, he reinstates her job and sobers up. Eric makes friends with and later starts dating Brenda Walker (Lesley Dunlop), which makes him happy. While having dinner with Brenda, Amy, and other guests, Val suddenly returns and is surprised not to be welcomed with open arms, but Eric asks his guests to leave before he, Amy and Val have a massive argument about her abandoning them. Eric is forced to choose between Brenda and Val and after advice from David and Amy, Eric chooses Brenda. Eventually, Brenda and Eric end their relationship and he resumes his relationships with Val.

In 2014, Eric is shocked when Val reveals that she had a fling while in Portugal. Her short-term partner comes looking for her as he is HIV positive, and may have given Val the virus. When Eric is ill, Val panics and thinks she has passed the virus onto him, but he only has mild flu. Eric recovers but is furious to see Val leaving her lover's car and ends their marriage. While they're on a break from one another, Eric has sex with Val's sister, Diane. They both regret it, but Diane is horrified to learn that Val may be HIV positive, and takes medication to fight the virus. Val finally tells Eric about her potential case of HIV and they both get tested. Eric is negative, but Val is HIV positive. This devastates the couple. While Val is watching films with Diane, she inadvertently lets slip about her and Eric's one-night stand, which leads to Val throwing them out and her breaking down. The next day, Eric tries to apologise but she throws a bottle of whisky at him, leading to him cutting his head. Val then tells everyone in the Woolpack about Eric and Diane's one night stand.

Eric discovers that Val took part in Bob Hope (Tony Audenshaw) and Carly Hope's (Gemma Atkinson) plan to commit life insurance fraud, to help Carly through her financial problems. Eric is tired of the arguing, caused by Val and her sister, Diane, who also discovered about Val's crime. During the wedding of Debbie Dingle (Charley Webb) and Pete Barton (Anthony Quinlan) in August 2015, Eric locks Val and Diane in the house of mirrors and wanders off to drink in a pub with Doug Potts (Duncan Preston) and Rodney Blackstock (Patrick Mower). Unbeknownst to him, during the helicopter crash, Val was killed in the house of mirrors by a sharp piece of glass. Eric arrives home the next day and he discovers Val's death. Eric believes Val is faking her death as she previously planned, and goes home to find her, but realises she is not there. David assures Eric that Val is dead and that it is not a joke. Eric is alone at home and he sees Val's ghost. Val turns on the stereo and picks the song that the couple enjoyed together. Eric gives Val one last cigarette and Val says her goodbyes, before slowly fading away. David returns to the house and Eric breaks down as he accepts that his wife has now gone. He blames Chrissie White (Louise Marwood) for Val's death, as she started the fire which led to the helicopter crash. He is angry when she pleads not guilty to reckless arson and he shows up at her house, armed with a cricket bat. He gives her an ultimatum, change her plea or he will beat a confession out of her. Chrissie's estranged husband Robert Sugden (Ryan Hawley) arrives and convinces Eric to leave. When Chrissie is later found not guilty and given a suspended sentence for arson, Eric throws a paintball at her. He is removed from the court and is later arrested. Eric returns home to find his house trashed and Val's engagement ring missing. Eric boards the house up and refuses to speak to anyone. Concerned about him, Diane goes to his house, along with other villagers and they start singing Christmas Carols. Eric ignores them until they start singing a song special to Val. He lets them in and they start celebrating Christmas. David shows up, pleased that Eric is moving on. He gives Eric Val's engagement ring, as Cheryl found it. They then share a hug. Eric reveals to David that he is upset that he never got to say goodbye to Val, so they, along with other villagers, visit Val's grave.

When Eric is looking after David's shop, it is robbed by two youths. Eric tries to stop them, but he is hit by a baseball bat and his arm is broken. After coming home from hospital, Eric refuses to leave the house and goes into a depression. Eric begins a relationship with barmaid Faith Dingle (Sally Dexter). Several months later, Eric discovers Faith has cheated on him with Zak Dingle (Steve Halliwell). Following this, Eric says goodbye to Faith as she leaves the village. He later continues his relationship with Brenda. Eric receives the COVID-19 vaccination.

== Reception ==
When Chittell was offered the role of Eric, it was for a 12 episode guest appearance. However, due to the positive reception from viewers, he was later promoted to a regular character. The Daily Mirror stated that Eric's "constant plotting, scheming, and often seducing, made him an instant hit". Chittell explained that due to Eric's poor treatment of women, men tend not to like his character, but women love him. He stated that he gets a lot of fan mail from women. In 2013, John Moores University did a study for the Co-operative store chain, and they found Eric to be the "unhealthiest character in soap". Their results showed that in 62% of his scenes, he was either holding an alcoholic drink, or talking about drinking alcohol. Senior British Heart Foundation cardiac nurse Doireann Maddock commented: "If Eric wants to reduce his risk of that second heart attack, he needs to spend less time in the Woolpack and more enjoying brisk walks in the Dales – and eating plenty of fruit and veg." In scenes aired in 2017, viewers felt that other characters were too harsh on Eric, and expressed an interest in his character being formed into a villain again.
