= Stephen Marchant (actor) =

English actor

Stephen Marchant is an English actor known for being the first actor to play Terence Turner on ITV's Emmerdale in 1985. Nick Brimble took over the role in 2006. Stephen Marchant is an actor, known for The Tall Guy (1989), The Bill (1984) and Emmerdale (1972, 1985).

Stephen attended Buckhurst Hill County High School (Boys Grammar School) in Essex 1971–1978 where he showed himself to be a keen and able actor, participating in many school plays.
