= Val Pollard =

Fictional character from Emmerdale

- Emmerdale character
- Portrayed by: Charlie Hardwick
- Duration: 2004–2015, 2017
- First appearance: 1 February 2004
- Last appearance: 25 December 2017
- Introduced by: Steve Frost (2004); Iain MacLeod (2017)
In-universe information
- Other names: Val Lambert
- Occupation: Barmaid; Pub Landlady; Businesswoman; B&B Landlady
- Sisters: Diane Sugden
- Husband: Eric Pollard (2008–2015)
- Sons: Paul Lambert
- Daughters: Sharon Lambert
- Adoptive daughters: Amy Wyatt
- Stepsons: David Metcalfe
- Granddaughters: Alice
- Nieces: Bernice Blackstock
- Other relatives: Gabby Thomas

Valerie "Val" Pollard (also Lambert) is a fictional character from the British ITV soap opera Emmerdale, played by Charlie Hardwick. She made her first screen appearance in the episodes broadcast on 1 February 2004. Val was introduced as the sister of established character Diane Sugden (Elizabeth Estensen). She later married Eric Pollard (Chris Chittell). Hardwick took a three-month break from Emmerdale to appear in a play and the character left on 10 February 2012. Val returned in June 2012 and was surprised to learn that Eric had begun in a relationship with Brenda Walker (Lesley Dunlop). She moved into Diane's pub after her marriage breakdown and helped to run it while Diane was away visiting her daughter.

In 2014, Val was told that she was HIV positive after a holiday fling while she was in Portugal. In 2015, it was announced that Hardwick had quit the soap. Val was killed off on 6 August 2015 in the highly publicised "Summer Fate" storyline, which saw a helicopter crash into the village. She made several appearances afterwards as a ghost to Eric and on a videotape describing her final wishes. Her final on-screen appearance aired on 31 August 2015. She later appeared as a ghost in Robert Sugden's (Ryan Hawley) dream on 25 December 2017. For her portrayal of Val, Hardwick won the award for Best Comedy Performance at the 2006 British Soap Awards.

== Storylines ==
Val arrives in Emmerdale in February 2004, surprising her sister, Diane Blackstock (Elizabeth Estensen). Their relationship has always been difficult as Diane had helped bring Val up after their mother died. Upon her arrival, Val has a black eye, which she tells Diane is her ex-boyfriend, Eugene Brown's (John Axon) fault. When Eugene arrives, he reveals that Val persuaded him to pay for her nose job before fleeing. Always on the lookout for the next man to fund her lifestyle, Val is delighted to find her ex-brother-in-law, Rodney Blackstock (Patrick Mower) is living in Emmerdale and now a millionaire. They soon begin a relationship and Val works with Diane in the pub. Val, never happy with just one man, cheats on Rodney with his much younger employee Danny Daggert (Cleveland Campbell). She eventually chooses Rodney, believing him to be the better long term choice. However, when Diane is diagnosed with colon cancer, Rodney is devastated and realizes that he is still in love with her. Diane rejects him but he ends his relationship with Val. Furious and rejected, Val goes to Italy to visit her son Paul (Matthew Bose) and his partner, Enzo Biannchi (Daniel D'Alessandro), returning for Diane's wedding to Jack Sugden (Clive Hornby) with a man half her age but this is quickly revealed to be a lie.

Furious at being rejected by Diane and Rodney, Val reveals her affair with Rodney while he was married to Diane and that Rodney is the father of her son, Paul. Horrified by her actions, Val is disowned by everyone close to her but she believes that she could turn it around. Val becomes close to Eric Pollard (Chris Chittell) and they go into partnership. Together they launch a fabrics company and Eric tries to restart his career in politics. Eric loves Val but his selfishness affects the relationship and he attributes to her for standing in the way of his political career. Val's ex-boyfriend Jimmy Pepper (Michael Gunn) returns and he is horrified to find Paul, who he had raised as his own, not to be his. He demands that Val repay him the maintenance he paid her and threatens to beat Paul up again unless Val pays him. In order to raise the money, Val starts embezzling at the pub under guise of robbery and is caught; Diane calls the police. Val is sentenced to community service and is forced to help local pensioner Noreen Bell (Jenny Tomasin). At first, Val hates Noreen but the two women become friends, joining forces to oppose Eric when he stands for council again. Val and Eric reunite and Val herself schemes to be rich and invests money in Pearl Ladderbanks’ (Meg Johnson) Internet Investment Scheme, unaware it is a con. When the truth comes out, Val is livid and Pearl leaves the village for a while. When Noreen is killed in the Kings River Showhome explosion, she leaves her money to Val and she buys half the Woolpack.

Val starts having problems with her eyes and accidentally knocks down Samson Dingle while driving. Eric later proposes and Val accepts and they marry. They later foster teenager Amy Wyatt but things are strained when Amy gives birth to a baby and decides to give him up for adoption. Val and Eric separate as she blames him for encouraging Amy to have Kyle adopted and goes to Portugal. Believing that Val is not returning after she empties their joint bank account, Eric starts dating Brenda Walker (Lesley Dunlop). Val returns to find them together and is furious and things get worse when she learns of their holiday plans. Val asks Eric's son, David Metcalfe (Matthew Wolfenden), to help her and finds him in The Woolpack with Alicia Gallagher (Natalie Anderson). When David refuses to help, Val turns nasty and starts attacking him and Eric but is stunned when Alicia punches her, bloodying her nose. Val calls the police and Alicia is arrested and later sentenced to a year in prison as she has a previous suspended sentence for assault. Val is then ostracized by the community. Val does try to withdraw her statement to the police, realizing that she has made a mistake, but as Alicia has already pleaded guilty, she cannot. Despite this, she does eventually win back Eric as he realizes that life with Brenda is dull compared to life with Val.

In January 2014, Val's Portugal fling, Ian Chamberlain (Robert Cavanah), arrives at The Woolpack unannounced and tells Val that he is HIV positive. This stuns Val and frightens her, leaving her worried that she has the virus and has possibly passed it on to Eric. She goes to get tested with Ian but cannot bring herself to have the test and lies that the test was negative but her behaviour shows otherwise, as she suddenly starts sleeping in the spare room and is cold with Eric. Diane and Victoria confront Val about it but Val reveals the truth to Victoria, who advises her to tell Eric the truth. Val admits to Eric that she had a fling with Ian and Eric forgives her but Val panics when Eric is ill but it is only mild flu. Eric realizes that Val has not told him everything and ends their marriage after seeing Val leave Ian's car. Hurt, Eric has a drunken one-night stand with Diane. Victoria, unaware of this, tells Diane that Val could be HIV positive, terrifying Diane. Diane immediately goes to the clinic and starts taking medication to fight the virus. Val finally plucks the courage up and tells Eric that she may be HIV positive, leaving him stunned. Val heads to the hospital the next day to get the results and Eric eventually turns up to support Val. They receive their results and Eric's results come back negative whilst Val's are positive.

Val is overwhelmed when Alicia throws her a surprise party and Diane reveals the truth about her one-night stand with Eric, Val is furious and throws a whisky bottle at Eric when he tries to apologize, cutting his head and subsequently feels guilty. Later, she humiliates Diane and Eric in The Woolpack by revealing their one-night stand to the regulars. Val gets drunk with Kerry Wyatt (Laura Norton) and they both fall over and Val's knee starts bleeding. Kerry is about to wipe the blood away but Val shouts at her not to touch it as she may contract HIV. Eric and Victoria then rush to help and Val is distraught when Eric has to wear gloves to treat her wound.

Val begins to annoy Jacob Gallagher (Joe-Warren Plant) so he posts online that somebody at Val and Eric's B&B has HIV, after overhearing that Val has been diagnosed. When Val finds out, she is stunned and decides to tell the shocked villagers that she is HIV positive. After being rude to Brenda when she offers her support, Val gets drunk and Jacob reveals that he was the culprit who posted her status online. She forgives Jacob and apologises for being irritating. Ian later arrives at the B&B so Eric punches him. This stuns Val and her new employee and friend, Finn Barton (Joe Gill). She takes Ian to the café, where they realise how well suited they are for one another. As they are leaving the café, Val and Ian share a passionate kiss, unaware that Eric has seen them. Val and Ian later begin dating but it doesn't last long and Val is devastated to find Eric selling her belongings outside The Woolpack. Val is later delighted when local delivery driver, Tiny Alcock (Tony Pritchard), takes a shine to her. They have numerous drinks and are attracted to one another, despite Eric warning Tiny to stay away from Val. The next day, Tiny makes it clear he wants to sleep with her but she panics and tells him she is just popping out for some condoms, but she actually confides in Victoria. She returns, and the pair sleep together. Unfortunately Tiny finds an appointment card for the sexual health clinic in Val's bag when looking for cigarettes and asks Val about it, so she tells him that she is HIV positive. Tiny is furious and tries to leave but Val tries to stop him. He pushes her away and she hits her head as Tiny storms out, leaving Val on the floor, devastated. The next morning, Val has a black eye and Eric thinks that Tiny hit her and confront him in the café, where Tiny is nasty about Val and her HIV status, infuriating Eric. The pair go outside, where a fight ensues and Val and Diane get involved as the police arrive and make things worst. Val is arrested for criminal damage after she vandalises Tiny's van with a key, Diane for assaulting a police officer after she accidentally elbows one in the face while trying to restrain her sister from throwing bread at Tiny, and Eric for assault after he kicks and punches Tiny. At the police station, they begin bickering, so they all spend the night in a cell, Diane and Eric are released without charge, while Val is released and charged with criminal damage, threatening behaviour and assault, which infuriates her. After being released, Val finally forgives Diane after months of feuding. The following day, Val gives a heart-felt talk to The Woolpack regulars about living with HIV, which is praised throughout the pub.

In early 2015, Val catches a cough from her new friend Tracy Shankley (Amy Walsh) and later collapses from pneumonia. Her son, Paul, returns to support Eric as Val slips into a coma. She later recovers, and encourages Finn to begin dating Darren Thompson (Danny Horn), a nurse who is looking after her. After discovering that Darren is HIV positive, Val begins a secret vendetta against him, in the hope that he will eventually leave Finn alone. He does so, but Finn discovers what Val has been up to and disowns her; he later forgives her when she persuades Darren to give him another chance. In June 2015, Val helps Carly Hope (Gemma Atkinson) and her father, Bob (Tony Audenshaw) to commit fraud in order for Carly to keep possession of Eric's son, David's, shop as he has emigrated to Portugal. Val dresses up as Bob's wife, Brenda, and signs contracts which give Carly the money to pay the shop's rent. However, this is revealed in July 2015 and Brenda and Eric are furious with Val, Carly and Bob for their thoughtless actions, with Brenda slapping Val for impersonating her. Brenda later phones the police, and Val and Bob are arrested, but Carly flees the village and escapes arrest. Val is furious to discover that she has no choice but to plead guilty at the court hearing over the fraud as the case is strongly against her. She ignores her lawyer and pleads innocent, which causes Eric to collapse and suffer a heart attack. When Tracy visits Eric in hospital, she makes a joke about life insurance, which gives Val the idea that she should fake her own death in order to escape her prison sentence, and that her body will never be found, as she and Eric will make a new life abroad.

When Diane finds out about Val's plan to fake her death, the sisters fall out and are forced to make up when Eric, Rodney and Douglas Potts (Duncan Preston) lock them inside the hall of mirrors at the village summer fair. Unbeknownst to them, an explosion caused by Chrissie White (Louise Marwood) sends a helicopter crashing through the roof where Debbie Dingle (Charley Webb) and Pete Barton's (Anthony Quinlan) wedding reception is taking place in the nearby village hall. When the suspended helicopter collapses into the village hall, another explosion tears through the hall and the neighbouring hall of mirrors, smashing the mirrors and injuring and trapping Val and Diane. Val reflects on her plans of faking her death, noting that more people would mourn Diane's death than her own, and intimating, given their history, that Diane would not care if she died. Diane makes Val understand that there is no need for competition between them, and warns her to believe that she would mourn for her if she died. Diane and Val then have a heart-to-heart and tell each other they love each other. As the emergency services enter the maze, Val offers for Diane to be saved before her, and as Diane is carried out of the rubble, Val looks up to see above her a hanging shard of glass. Knowing that it may fall onto her before her rescue, she lights a cigarette and shouts at the glass, that she is strong due to her illness. The shard then falls and she is killed.

The next day, Diane and David inform Eric of Val's death. Eric refuses to believe she is dead and convinces himself that Val has gone through with her plan to fake her death. Val then appears as a ghost, to Eric and tells him that she is dead. They listen to their favourite song and she bids him farewell then disappears. Val is later seen when Diane and Doug watch her goodbye DVD message to Diane, the day before her funeral. Val is last seen in Robert Sugden's (Ryan Hawley) dream sequence that he experiences in Christmas 2017.

== Development ==
=== Casting ===
Hardwick joined the cast of Emmerdale as Val Lambert in early 2004. Val was introduced as the sister of established character, Diane Blackstock (Elizabeth Estensen). Hardwick initially signed a six-month contract with the show. Speaking of her casting, Hardwick told Gordon Barr of the Evening Chronicle "I've been a massive fan of Emmerdale since day one. In fact, I watch all the soaps so to now be in it truly is a dream come true. And what a character. Let's just say she has the potential to get more flamboyant."

=== Rodney Blackstock ===
Discussing Val's reaction to Rodney and Diane, Hardwick said "Val's first thought is 'aye aye, he's trying to get into the back room'! [Laughs] You know what I mean! Then Val thinks that he's trying to get into Diane's heart, before thinking that Rodney wants Val out of the pub. That's the killer. She thinks he's a dirty dog. Then when she sees Diane give Rodney a kiss on the cheek, she immediately thinks that there's trouble afoot. Val knows Rodney – she's been there, done it, had the child and been the babysitter. And when Val originally turned up in Emmerdale, she went back to drink from the same pool, so she definitely knows what he's like." Also discussing if Val is jealous, Hardwick also said "Whenever Val's getting attention and she isn't, there's some kind of jealousy! But on this occasion, though, Val just thinks, 'he's not getting my pub'. Consciously, she's worried about Diane but subconsciously, she's only ever totally concerned about herself. I've said this before, but I wrote a list of quintessential characteristics of Val on a post-it note when I first arrived at Emmerdale and I keep them in my script file. She's glamour and sex, she always tells the truth – even when she's lying – and everything she does, she does for Val."

=== Temporary departure (2012) ===
It was reported that Hardwick would take a three-month break from the show to appear in a stage production called, The Awkward Squad set in the North East. Hardwick also confirmed on ITV's daytime program, This Morning that two different exit scenes had been filmed and she did not know which version would be eventually broadcast. "I don't know which one they've used. The director said, 'I'll decide which one is best in the edit". Hardwick also expressed her deep concern that she could potentially write herself out of the show, "It's a risk. I'm going out to do a play, and I might write myself out".

=== Departure and death (2015) ===
It was announced on 11 June 2015 that Hardwick had quit the role of Val after appearing regularly for 11 years. The actress stated she would be furious if Val's exit plot was related to her infamous HIV storyline. On her decision to leave the show, Hardwick said: "It's taken me many, many, many months of wrangling. I was thinking perhaps I was just under the weather, or that it was the weather and I just had to pull myself together! But I think I knew I had to go. Not because I hate it, but just because I have to try and get a bit of my life back. I was always commuting from home – I've had a suitcase at the end of my bed for 12 years". Her departure aired in August 2015, among the soap's highly publicised "Summer Fate" storyline, which saw a helicopter crash into the village and kill several villagers, one of which being Val.

== Reception ==
For her portrayal of Val, Hardwick won Best Comedy Performance at the 2006 British Soap Awards. Hardwick received a nomination in the same category in 2007, 2008 and 2011. The actress also earned a nomination for Funniest Performance at the 2011 Inside Soap Awards. Holy Soap said that Val's most memorable moment was being kidnapped by the Dingles on her wedding day. Hardwick was nominated for the Best Actress award at the 2014 British Soap Awards for her portrayal of Val. She was also nominated for the Best On-Screen Partnership award alongside Chittell, but lost to Coronation Street's David Neilson (Roy Cropper) and Julie Hesmondhalgh (Hayley Cropper).

Commenting on the character's scheming, a critic for the Daily Record stated: "Val Pollard is not the most sensible of people. In fact, when her schemes aren't backfiring, her decisions go awry and hurt those closest to her."

In September 2015, Laura-Jayne Tyler of Inside Soap commented on Hardwick's appearances as Val after her death, "No one has ever done a better job of milking their death than Charlie Hardwick, aka Val Pollard. Her DVD of final requests was certainly 'Val-tacular' – and quite incredibly camp!"
