= Paula Tilbrook =

English actress (1930–2019)

- Born: 16 January 1930; Salford, Lancashire, England
- Died: 1 December 2019 (aged 89)
- Occupation: Actress
- Years active: 1969–2015
- Known for: Role of Betty Eagleton in Emmerdale (1994–2015)
- Spouse: Leslie Hall (m. 1952; died 1985)
- Children: 2

Paula Tilbrook (16 January 1930 – 1 December 2019) was an English actress who played Betty Eagleton in the ITV soap opera Emmerdale from 1994 to 2015.

== Career ==
Born in Salford, Lancashire, Tilbrook begun her career performing on stage across North East England. After a break from acting to raise her children, she moved into television, appearing in the sitcom The Dustbinmen in 1969 and alongside Ken Dodd in Ken Dodd and the Diddymen from 1969 to 1973; thereafter, she became a regular on Dodd's radio programmes.

In 1977, Tilbrook made an appearance as Estelle Plimpton in Coronation Street, and followed this by appearances as Olive Taylor-Brown in the same show in 1978 and 1980, and Vivian Barford from 1991 to 1993. In 1979, she appeared in Tales of the Unexpected, and in 1988, Tilbrook played Flo Capp in the sitcom Andy Capp. She played dog-lover Mrs Tattersall in Open All Hours, and three roles in Last of the Summer Wine. Her other credits include Crown Court, Brookside and two episodes of the BBC's Play for Today. Tilbrook's film credits include Yanks and Alan Bennett's A Private Function.

In 1994, Tilbrook joined the ITV soap opera Emmerdale as Betty Eagleton, a character known for her love of gossip and her on-screen relationship with Seth Armstrong (played by Stan Richards). Initially signed to appear in only three episodes, she remained in the role for 21 years, and at the time of her departure was the longest-running female cast member. In April 2015, it was announced that Tilbrook would be retiring from acting and her final scenes as Betty aired on 25 May, which saw the character leave for Australia. She briefly reprised her role in Emmerdale on Christmas Day 2015, when Betty appeared via Skype to speak to the villagers.

== Personal life and death ==
Tilbrook was married to Leslie Hall from 1952 until his death in 1985 from Alzheimer's disease. They had a son, Greg (born November 1953), and a daughter, Gaynor (born January 1957). From 1962 onwards, she lived in Altrincham, Cheshire (later part of Greater Manchester).

Tilbrook died on 1 December 2019, aged 89; however, her death was not announced by her family until July 2020.
