= Elizabeth Estensen =

English actress

- Born: 10 August 1949 (age 76); Stockton-on-Tees, County Durham, England
- Occupation: Actress
- Years active: 1974–2022
- Television: The Liver Birds; T-Bag Series; Coronation Street; Emmerdale
- Spouse: Philip Allen (m. 1983)
- Children: 1

Elizabeth Estensen (born 10 August 1949) is an English actress, known for playing Diane Sugden on the ITV soap opera Emmerdale from 1999 to 2021, with a guest stint in 2022. She has also made appearances in various British television series, including The Liver Birds, T-Bag and Coronation Street.

== Early and personal life ==
Estensen was born on 10 August 1949 and had a Norwegian grandfather, from whom she inherited her surname. She grew up in Stockton-on-Tees, County Durham. Her mother was a primary school teacher, and her father was a merchant seaman and solicitor's clerk. Estensen considered becoming a speech therapist, but signed up for a Drama and English teaching course at Manchester Polytechnic instead. Estensen has been married to husband Philip Allen since May 1983, and the pair have a son together, James Otto Allen.

== Career ==
Following graduation from Manchester Polytechnic, she moved to Liverpool and joined the Everyman repertory company. While appearing in a production of John, Paul, George, Ringo ... and Bert, she was noticed by actress Nerys Hughes, who was looking for a replacement for Polly James in her sitcom, The Liver Birds. Estensen was cast as Carol Boswell, her debut television role, in 1975. After The Liver Birds concluded in 1979, Estensen made appearances in films and series including T-Bag and Far from the Madding Crowd. Between 1996 and 1998, she appeared in the ITV soap opera Coronation Street as Pam Middleton. Then in 1999, she was cast in the ITV soap opera Emmerdale as series regular Diane Sugden, a role she has played since. In 2007, she won a shared award at the British Soap Awards for Spectacular Scene of the Year, which saw a house collapse that her character was involved in. In September 2021, Estensen confirmed that she had filmed her final scenes as Diane in Emmerdale. Her final episode was broadcast on 29 October. However, Estensen agreed to return to the soap in October 2022 for a guest stint, for the show's 50th anniversary.

== Filmography ==
Year	Title	Role
1975–1979	The Liver Birds	Carol Boswell
1976	Within These Walls	Lorna Rogers
1977	Play for Today: Our Day Out	Susan
1980	The Adventure Game	Herself
1984	Danger: Marmalade at Work	Wendy Wooley
1985–1989	T-Bag	Tallulah-Bag
1993	The Bill	Mrs. Smith
1993	Casualty	Madeleine Howard
1993	The Upper Hand	Patsy
1995	A Touch of Frost	Susan Mackintosh
1995–2000	Mike and Angelo	Daphne Fawkes-Bentley
1995	Pie in the Sky	Evelyn Wilkes
1995	Cracker	Reenie Wise
1996–1998	Coronation Street	Pam Middleton (17 episodes)
1997	Last of the Summer Wine	Educational Adviser
1999	Wing and a Prayer	Mrs. Hillary Campbell
1999	Polterguests	Mrs. Swinton
1999–2022	Emmerdale	Diane Sugden (2,860 episodes)
2001	In a Land of Plenty	Rachel
