= Stan Richards =

English actor (1930–2005)

- Born: Stanley Richardson; 8 December 1930; Gawber, Barnsley, England
- Died: 11 February 2005 (aged 74); Barnsley, England
- Occupation: Actor
- Years active: 1977–2004
- Spouse: Susannah Richards (m. 1952; died 1994)
- Children: 6

Stanley Richardson, known professionally as Stan Richards (8 December 1930 – 11 February 2005), was an English television actor, best known for his portrayal of Seth Armstrong in the ITV soap opera Emmerdale.

== Career ==
He played the role of Seth Armstrong from May 1978 until his death of emphysema in 2005, having been originally "signed" to the series for a run of just 4 weeks. He had previously acted in six episodes of Coronation Street as Arthur Stokes, having started his career aged 15 as a pub pianist.

Upon his death, his life and work were honoured at the British Soap Awards in 2005.

== Filmography ==
| Year | Title | Role | Notes |
|---|---|---|---|
| 1963 | Move Over, Darling | Officer | Uncredited |
| 1977 | The Price of Coal | Albert | Credited |
| 1979 | Agatha | Hotel Porter | Uncredited |
