= Carolyn Pickles =

English actress (born 1952)

- Born: 8 February 1952 (age 74); Halifax, England
- Occupation: Actress
- Years active: 1975–present
- Notable work: Emmerdale
- Relatives: Christina Pickles (aunt)

Carolyn Pickles (born 8 February 1952) is an English actress. She was born in Halifax, and has appeared in West End theatre and on British television. She is known for playing DCI Kim Reid in The Bill and Shelley Williams in Emmerdale.

== Life and career ==
Pickles was born in Halifax. She lives in London. She is the daughter of the Circuit Judge James Pickles, a niece of actress Christina Pickles, and great-niece of Wilfred Pickles, the TV and radio personality. Pickles read drama at the University of Manchester taking roles in a number of student productions, then spent three years with the National Youth Theatre. She later joined the BBC's Radio Drama Company.

Pickles played the lead role, in 1986, as Miss Bluebell (Margaret Kelly, founder of a dance group called the Bluebell Girls) in the BBC series Bluebell. She also appeared in The Bill for two years as DCI Kim Reid, as Simone Trevelyan in May to December and in The Tales of Para Handy as Lady Catherine Ramsay. Pickles also appeared in the cult BBC children's educational drama series Through The Dragon's Eye. She was a leading character (12 episodes in 1982) in the TV series We'll Meet Again. Pickles has appeared in a number of films, including Roman Polanski's Tess (1979), Agatha (1979) and The Mirror Crack'd (1980). In 1990, she appeared in an episode of Casualty (Series 5 episode 8). In 1995 she played as Linda Livingstone in I Don't Speak English with Paolo Villaggio. Pickles appeared in Harry Potter and the Deathly Hallows – Part 1 as the Muggle Studies teacher, Charity Burbage. In 2007 she played the part of Jane Templeton in the final episode of the first series of Lewis an ITV drama.

In 2011, Pickles played Mrs Gulliver in Series 2 and 3 of Land Girls. In 2013, Pickles played journalist Maggie Radcliffe in the ITV drama Broadchurch. She appeared in all three series, from 2013 to 2017.

Since 2022, she has played Reverend Mother Adrian in Sister Boniface Mysteries in a recurring role. In October 2023, she appeared in an episode of the BBC soap opera Doctors as Joyce Kilter.

== Selected filmography ==
=== Film ===
| Year | Title | Role | Notes |
|---|---|---|---|
| 1979 | Agatha | Charlotte Fisher | |
| 1979 | Tess | Marian | |
| 1980 | Brothers and Sisters | Theresa Bennett/ Jennifer Collins | |
| 1980 | The Mirror Crack'd | Miss Giles | |
| 1982 | East Lynne | Joyce Hallijohn | TV Movie |
| 1984 | Champions | Sally | |
| 1984 | Waiting for Alan | Marcia | |
| 1989 | The Yellow Wallpaper | Jennie | TV Movie |
| 1995 | I Don't Speak English | Linda | |
| 1997 | Breakout | Diane Cresswell | TV Movie |
| 2001 | Hans Christian Andersen: My Life as a Fairy Tale | Mrs. Dickens | TV Movie |
| 2002 | Ali G Indahouse | Headmistress | |
| 2002 | Prince William | Camilla Parker-Bowles | TV Movie |
| 2007 | Joe's Palace | Mrs. Hopkins | TV Movie |
| 2007 | Lady Godiva: Back in the Saddle | Margaret Tanner | |
| 2009 | The Imaginarium of Doctor Parnassus | Shopper | |
| 2010 | Harry Potter and the Deathly Hallows – Part 1 | Charity Burbage | |
| 2014 | Bonobo | Celia | |
| 2014 | Maybe Tomorrow | Marial (present) | Short |
| 2018 | The Spy Who Dumped Me | Darsha | |
| 2022 | Christmas on Mistletoe Farm | Grandma | |
| 2023 | Pareidolia | Jean Clarke | Short |
| 2025 | The Choral | Miss Muschamp | |

=== Television ===
| Year | Title | Role | Notes |
|---|---|---|---|
| 1975 | Coronation Street | Michelle Turnbull | Episode #1527 |
| 1981 | Bless Me Father | Helen | Episode: "Woman" |
| 1981 | Bread or Blood | Mary | 5 episodes |
| 1981 | The Gentle Touch | Reporter | Episode: "Scapegoat" |
| 1982 | Claire | Tessa | 1 episode (TV mini-series) |
| 1982 | Play for Today | Jill | Episode: "Willie's Last Stand" |
| 1982 | We'll Meet Again | Sally Bilton | 10 episodes |
| 1983 | All for Love | Grace | Episode: "Letting the Birds Go Free" |
| 1983 | Mr. Right | Esther | 4 episodes |
| 1984 | Lace | Muscles Templeton | 2 episodes (TV mini-series) |
| 1985 | Bulman | Lisa | Episode: "A Moveable Feast" |
| 1985 | Juliet Bravo | Alice Ryan | Episode: "Hostage to Fortune" |
| 1986 | Bluebell | Margaret Kelly | 8 episodes |
| 1987 | First Sight | Greta | Episode: "Leaving Home" |
| 1989 | Storyboard | Clare | Episode: "A Question of Commitment" |
| 1989 | Through the Dragon's Eye | Doris | 8 episodes |
| 1989 - 1994 | May to December | Simone Trevelyan | 24 episodes |
| 1990 | Chancer | Dolly Attwood | 2 episodes |
| 1990 - 2022 | Casualty | Diane Robinson/ Gerry Todd/ Willow Hedges | 3 episodes |
| 1990 - 1992 | The Bill | DCI Kim Reid | 52 episodes |
| 1992 | Boon | Sarah Blake | Episode: "The Sharp End" |
| 1994 - 1995 | The Tales of Para Handy | Lady Ramsay | 5 episodes |
| 1995 | Castles | Jane Rhodes | 3 episodes |
| 1996 | Drop the Dead Donkey | Anna Coates | Episode: "Charnley in Love" |
| 1996 | Screen Two | Returning Officer | Episode: "Crossing the Floor" |
| 1997 | All Quiet on the Preston Front | Jeanetta | 6 episodes |
| 1997 | Original Sin | Mrs. Blackett | 3 episodes |
| 1997 | Where the Heart Is | Barbara Figgis | Episode: "Dream" |
| 1998 | Coronation Street | Moira Wood | Episode #4405 |
| 1998 | Megamaths | Queen of Diamonds | Episode: "Money to 50p" |
| 1999 | Holby City | Barbara Cousins | Episode: "Take Me With You" |
| 1999 | Peak Practice | Kate Loughton | Episode: "Wood for the Trees" |
| 2000 | Midsomer Murders | Sister Lovelace | Episode: "Blue Herrings" |
| 2000 - 2001 | Big Meg, Little Meg | Margaret | 9 episodes |
| 2000 - 2023 | Doctors | Annie Foster/ Ruth Mills/ Mrs. Carruthers/ Nessa Jewell/ Cynthia Percifield/ Joyce Kilter | 8 episodes |
| 2001 | Poirot | Emily Brewster | Episode: "Evil Under the Sun" |
| 2001 - 2002 | Brookside | Jill Plummer | 4 episodes |
| 2002 | Where the Heart Is | Dr. Tina Humphries | Episode: "Flesh and Blood" |
| 2003 | Canterbury Tales | Judy | Episode: "The Wife of Bath" |
| 2003 - 2005 | Emmerdale | Shelly Williams | 75 episodes |
| 2006 | Brief Encounters | Sue | Episode: "Lost and Found" |
| 2006 | Prime Suspect | Pauline | 2 episodes |
| 2007 | Lewis | Jane Templeton | Episode: "Expiation" |
| 2008 | Foyle's War | Anna Calder | Episode: "All Clear" |
| 2008 | Kingdom | Patricia Wright | Episode #2.2 |
| 2010 | Midsomer Murders | Wendy Minchin | Episode: "The Made-to-Measure Murders" |
| 2010 | M.I. High | Mrs. Stoneaway | Episode: "Skulldiggery" |
| 2011 | Candy Cabs | Delia Pritchard | Episode #1.3 |
| 2011 | Land Girls | Mrs. Gulliver | 9 episodes |
| 2013 - 2017 | Broadchurch | Maggie Radcliffe | 23 episodes |
| 2014 | Law & Order: UK | Maureen Riley | Episode: "Safe from Harm" |
| 2016 | Holby City | Jane Rutherford | Episode: "All That Glitters" |
| 2016 | New Blood | Maureen Williams | 3 episodes |
| 2017 | Graceless | Gautierrez (voice) | 4 episodes |
| 2018 | Vera | Rita Fenton | Episode: "Blood and Bone" |
| 2019 | MotherFatherSon | Ruth | 4 episodes (TV mini-series) |
| 2021 | The Canterville Ghost | Mrs. Umney | 2 episodes |
| 2022 - 2025 | Sister Boniface Mysteries | Reverend Mother Adrian | 12 episodes |
| 2024 | Beyond Paradise | Rebecca Thompson | Episode: "Gettroffen" |
| 2024 | Curfew | Mysterious Woman | Episode: "Pipe Down" |
| 2024 | Grace | Aileen Daly | Episode: "Dead Man's Time" |
| 2026 | Runaway | Mrs. O'Hara | 2 episodes (TV mini-series) |
