= Richard Thorp =

English actor (1932–2013)

- Publicity picture of Thorp
- Born: Richard Stanley Thorp; 2 January 1932; Purley, Surrey, England
- Died: 22 May 2013 (aged 81); Shrewsbury, Shropshire, England
- Occupation: Actor
- Years active: 1949–2013
- Known for: Role of Alan Turner in Emmerdale (1982–2013)

Richard Stanley Thorp (2 January 1932 – 22 May 2013) was an English actor. He was best known for portraying Alan Turner in the ITV soap opera Emmerdale from 1982 to 2013. He also appeared in films such as The Dam Busters (1955) and The Barretts of Wimpole Street (1957).

== Early life ==
Thorp was born in Purley, London. While showing early ambitions to act, he started working in the shoe business, Lilley & Skinner, where his father was one of several directors. There, he began writing advertising copy including the line "Men's shoes that men choose" while continuing to pursue amateur dramatics. However, it was his frequent bad time-keeping that caused him to be sacked by his father, enabling him to pursue his ambition and train at the Guildhall School of Music and Drama.

== Career ==
Thorp's leading television roles include Dr. John Rennie in Emergency Ward 10 from 1957 to 1961, and Doug Randall in Crossroads in 1975. He also appeared in a 1982 episode of Strangers. He was the longest-serving member of Emmerdale since the death of Clive Hornby in 2008. While he was happy to stay in the role of Alan Turner for so long, he complained that his character was not used as much any more.

Thorp appeared as Lovejoy, a British Railways official, in an episode of To the Manor Born centred on the proposed closure of the local railway station. He also appeared on Lily Savage's Blankety Blank.

== Personal life ==
Thorp was one of Emmerdale's most private actors, although he gave an interview in 1995 with The People and revealed that he was separated from his wife, but they still lived in the same house. Thorp was very good friends with Lorraine Chase, who played his on-screen daughter, Steph Stokes, in Emmerdale, and Sheree Murphy, who played his on-screen granddaughter, Tricia Stokes, in the same programme.

Thorp took a break from Emmerdale in July 2009 after undergoing a knee operation and returned in April 2010.

== Death ==
Thorp died in Shrewsbury on 22 May 2013. Emmerdale producer Kate Oates stated: "Richard's death is a sad loss to Emmerdale, of which he was at the heart for so many wonderful years. Richard had a brilliant sense of humour and he will be missed by every single member of our production whose lives he touched."

== Filmography ==
=== Film ===
Year	Title	Role	Notes
1949	Melody in the Dark	Dick	
1955	The Dam Busters	Squadron Leader Henry Maudslay	
1957	The Barretts of Wimpole Street	Alfred Barrett	
1957	There's Always a Thursday	Dennis Potter	
1957	The Good Companions	David	
1960	The Last Train	Sergeant Hall	Short film
1962	The Iron Maiden	Harry Markham	
1963	Mystery Submarine	Lt. Chatterton	
1963	Lancelot and Guinevere	Sir Gareth	
1963	Bitter Harvest	Rex	
1972	Suburban Wives	Sarah's Husband	

=== Television ===
Year	Title	Role	Notes
1959-1961	Emergency Ward 10	Dr. John Rennie	98 episodes
1962	Edgar Wallace Mysteries	John Durran	Episode: "The £20,000 Kiss"
1966	Watch the Birdies	Pembridge	4 episodes
1971	A Family at War	Derek Robbins	
1973	...And Mother Makes Three	Stanley Marsh	
1978	The Cedar Tree	Geoffrey Cartland	Series 3
1982	Strangers	Det. Sgt. Jacklin	
1982–2013	Emmerdale	Alan Turner	2671 episodes (final appearance)
