= Lorraine Chase =

British actress

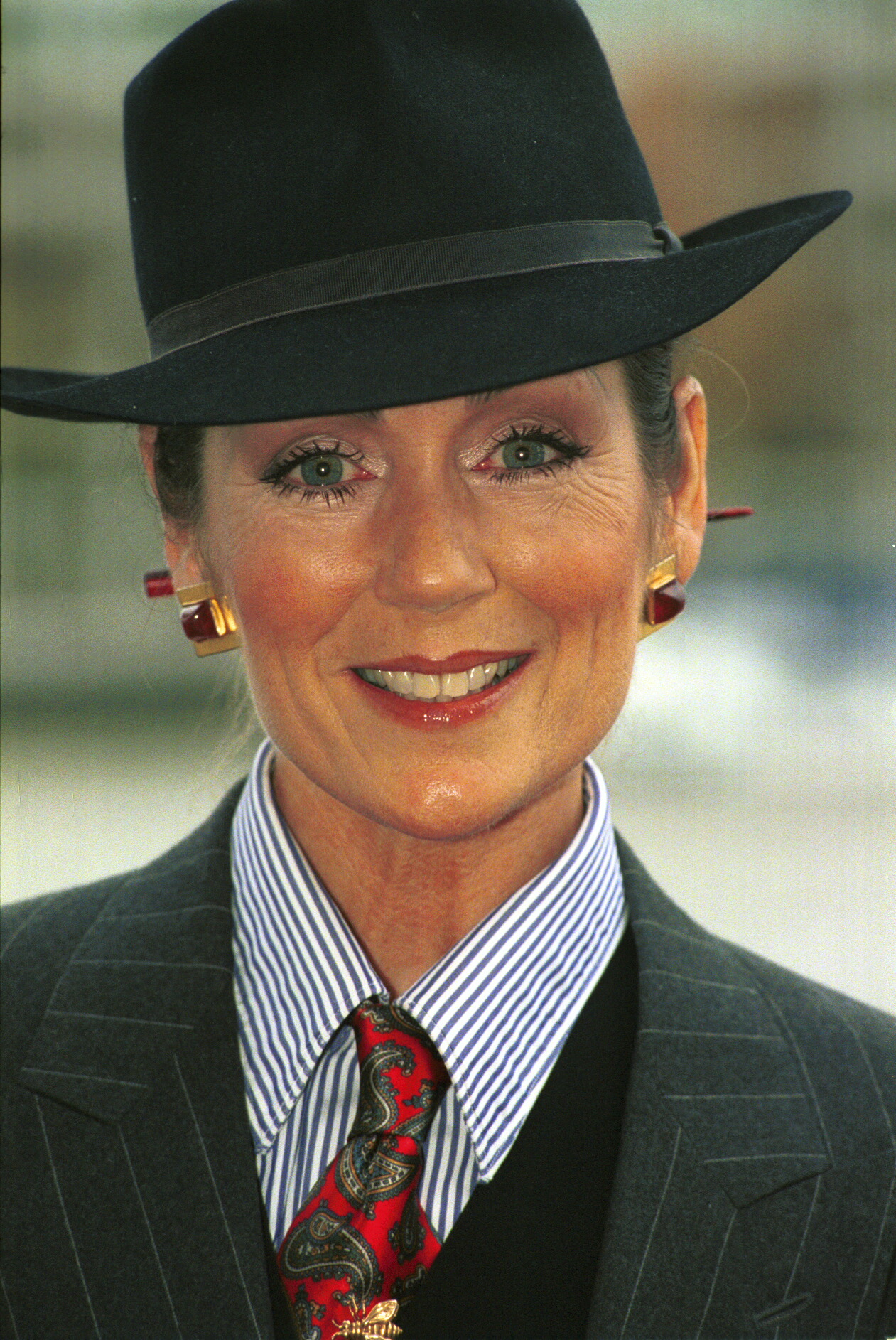
- Chase in 2001
- Born: 16 July 1951 (age 75); Deptford, London, England
- Occupations: Model; actress
- Years active: 1976–present

Lorraine Chase (born 16 July 1951) is an English actress and former model. She became well known for her strong south east London accent and frequent use of cockney slang, and found fame through a series of television adverts for Campari before embarking on an acting career. She is best known for playing the role of Steph Stokes in ITV soap opera Emmerdale from 2002 to 2006, with a brief return in 2013. Her partner, John Knight, died from cancer in 1996.

== Television ==
After initially working as a model, Chase came to public attention in the mid-1970s when she began appearing in television adverts for Campari. The comical adverts were filmed in exotic locations with Chase having drinks with an elegant, sophisticated gentleman suitor played by Jeremy Clyde. Upon his romantic question "Were you truly wafted here from paradise?", Chase would declare in her south east London accent "No, Luton Airport!" The line became something of a catchphrase and inspired the 1979 hit record "Luton Airport" by Cats U.K. Contrary to public belief, Chase was not involved with the record in any way, though she did make a novelty record of her own in 1979, entitled "It's Nice 'Ere, Innit" (also based on a line from another one of her Campari ads). However, this was unsuccessful. In 2009, the Campari ad featuring Chase was placed 41st in Channel 4's 100 Greatest TV Adverts.

From 1979, Chase was a recurring guest on the BBC quiz show Blankety Blank, hosted by Terry Wogan and later Les Dawson.

In 1980, she appeared in the ITV children's television programme Worzel Gummidge, as the character Dolly Clothes-Peg. Dolly tried to woo the hapless scarecrow Worzel, played by Jon Pertwee, but he spurned her in favour of his unrequited love affair with Aunt Sally, played by Una Stubbs.

The same year, Chase began her most prominent role in the ITV sitcom The Other 'Arf, in which she co-starred with John Standing. The Other 'Arf ran for four series until 1984, after which Chase appeared in the less successful 1984 TV sitcom Lame Ducks. In 1985 she appeared as "Her Ladyship", alongside Donald Sinden in a showroom video for Austin Rover called "Advance to Mayfair".

Following this, Chase made sporadic appearances on television as herself on light entertainment series such as The Bob Monkhouse Show and Surprise, Surprise, though she did not continue her television acting career until the late 1990s when she appeared in episodes of Casualty and The Bill. In 2000, she had a recurring role in the TV series Lock, Stock....

In 2002, Chase joined the cast of the long-running ITV soap opera Emmerdale, playing Steph Stokes. Executive producer Steve Frost chose her to play the mother of Sheree Murphy's character, Tricia Dingle due to their physical resemblance.

Since leaving Emmerdale, Chase appeared in episodes of My Family (2007) and Doctors (2009). In 2010, she took part in the "Soap Star Special" edition of the Channel 4 series Come Dine with Me. In 2011, she was a contestant on the ITV show I'm a Celebrity...Get Me Out of Here! which aired in late 2011. She was the fourth celebrity to be eliminated from the jungle on 27 November 2011, finishing in ninth place overall.

In September 2013, Chase returned to reprise her role of Steph Forsythe in Emmerdale, returning for the funeral of long running character Alan Turner, played by Richard Thorp.

Chase is a patron of the theatre charity The Music Hall Guild of Great Britain and America.

In December 2014, Chase appeared on the Christmas special of Pointless Celebrities, partnered with Christopher Biggins.

In 2017, Chase joined fellow celebrities Simon Callow, Nigel Havers and Debbie McGee in the Channel 5 show Celebrity Carry on Barging.

In August 2018, Chase took part in Celebs on the Farm, and was eliminated on day 7.

In January and November 2019, she appeared as a patient in Holby City. 21 years previously, in 1998, Chase had appeared as a different character in Holby City's sister drama series Casualty.

== Other work ==
As well as her various television credits, Chase has also appeared in a variety of stage productions, including pantomime, comedy and drama. Her first acting role following her Campari advertisements in the 1970s was in a play, The Undertaking, starring Kenneth Williams. Since then she has appeared in stage productions of Pygmalion, Little Shop of Horrors, Me and My Girl, Tea For Two, and Run For Your Wife. In 2007, she toured the UK in a production of the thriller Dead Guilty.

Chase's film credits include the 1979 Charles Bronson film Love and Bullets, and the low budget 2002 film Living in Hope.

She also appeared as a guest in an episode of the BBC radio show Just A Minute, alongside regulars Clement Freud, Kenneth Williams and Peter Jones.

She was an interview guest on Parkinson in 1979, on an episode also featuring Kenneth Williams. She was a guest panellist on Loose Women in October 2012, to celebrate 40 years of Emmerdale.

In February 2013, Chase appeared and was interviewed on the breakfast television show Daybreak.

In May 2015, she starred in the LGBT short feature Heavens To Betsy, described as a "queer re-imagined fairy-tale".
