= Richard Shelton (actor) =

British actor and singer

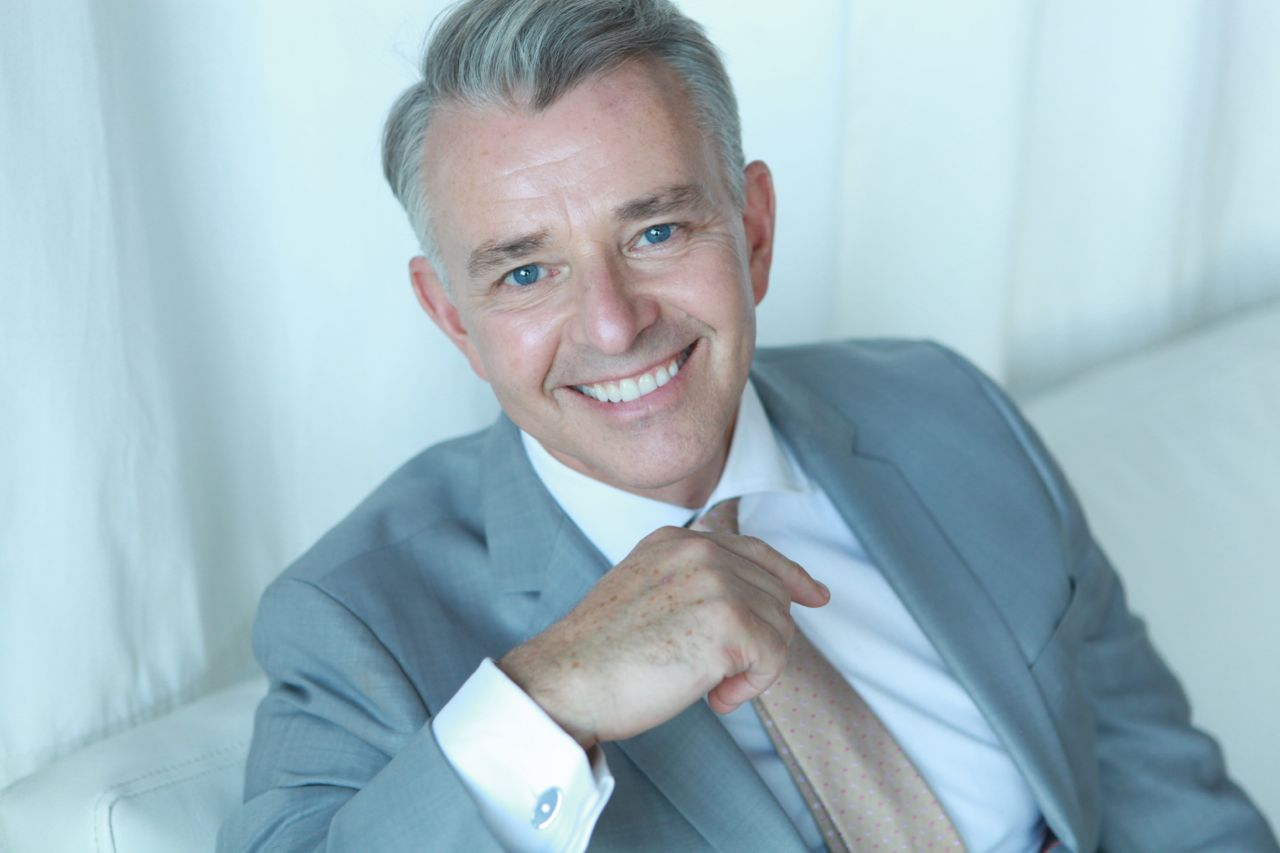
- Born: Wolverhampton, England
- Occupations: Actor and singer
- Years active: 1984–present
- Website: Official website

Richard Shelton is a British actor and singer. He has performed in television and film, most notably in the television series Emmerdale. His theater credits include playing Frank Sinatra in Rat Pack Confidential where he was recognized as 'Best Actor in a Leading Role.' As a jazz singer he has released numerous albums, including An Englishman In Love In L.A. which was recorded with surviving members of Sinatra's band.

== Early life and education ==
Shelton is from Wolverhampton, England. He has said he became interested in performing as a young boy after watching The Sound of Music and Oliver!, and that his first public performance was at the Wolverhampton Grand Theatre with a local dance school. At age 16, he enrolled at what is now University College Birmingham. He graduated in 1981 with an OND in Hotel and Catering Management. During his studies, he appeared in a production of Cabaret at the Crescent Theatre. Following a nine-month placement at London's Grosvenor House Hotel, he spent several years working in hotels in London and the Middle East, eventually serving as a director at InterContinental Hotels.

== Career ==
At age 32, he co-founded London's Bridewell Theatre with a group of acting friends, and left the hotel business after an agent signed him. His professional acting debut was for the part of Edmund Sweetenham in the UK tour of the play A Murder is Announced. In 2002, Shelton was recognized as 'Best Actor in a Leading Role' for his portrayal of Frank Sinatra in Rat Pack Confidential, a play adapted from the Shawn Levy book of the same name. Shelton wrote and starred in Sinatra and Me for 2 consecutive seasons at the Edinburgh Festival to critical acclaim. In 2018, Shelton wrote and starred in Sinatra: RAW. His performance earned a nomination for 'Best Male Performance in a Musical at The Offies 2020.

Beginning in 2005, Shelton became a series regular as Dr. Adam Forsythe in Emmerdale. Earlier credits in British television included EastEnders and Family Affairs. In the United States, he has guest-starred in House of Lies and Jane the Virgin.

Shelton's film credits include Simon Curtis's 2011 biographical drama My Week with Marilyn. In 2015, he appeared in the British crime film Brash Young Turks and in the short thriller Do Not Disturb, for which he received 'Best Supporting Actor' nominations at the British Horror Film Festival and the Chicago Horror Film Festival. In 2019, he co-starred in the biographical film Palau the Movie.

Shelton is also a jazz singer. He has performed on the UK jazz circuit, and recorded his debut album Top Cat at London's Abbey Road Studios with a 65-piece orchestra. He later moved to Los Angeles, and in 2020 recorded An Englishman in Love in LA with members of Sinatra's surviving band, including bassist Chuck Berghofer, drummer Gregg Field and pianist Mike Lang. The album won an International Talent Award.

== Partial filmography ==
=== Film ===
| Year | Title | Role | Notes | Ref |
|---|---|---|---|---|
| 2000 | Silent Witness | Simon Little | Television short | |
| 2011 | My Week with Marilyn | Waiter | | |
| 2015 | Do Not Disturb | Detective Forbes | Short film | |
| 2015 | Brash Young Turks | Conrad Holmes | | |
| 2019 | Palau the Movie | Major Ian Thomas | | |

=== Television ===
| Year | Title | Role | Notes | Ref |
|---|---|---|---|---|
| 1997 | EastEnders | Policeman 3 | 1 episode | |
| 1997 | Family Affairs | Trevor | 1 episode | |
| 2005-2006 | Emmerdale | Dr. Adam Forsythe | Series regular | |
| 2014 | House of Lies | Mr. Benson | 1 episode (s3e10 "Comeuppance") | |
| 2016-2017 | Jane the Virgin | Arnaud | 2 episodes ("Chapter Fifty-One", "Chapter Fifty-Two") | |

=== Theatre ===
| Year | Title | Role | Venue | Notes | Ref |
|---|---|---|---|---|---|
| | A Murder is Announced | Edmund Sweetenham | UK tour | Produced by Bill Kenwright; professional debut | |
| 2002 | Rat Pack Confidential | Frank Sinatra | Nottingham Playhouse | Manchester Evening News Theatre Awards nomination, Best Actor in a Leading Role; based on the book by Shawn Levy, adapted by Paul Sirett | |
| 2016 | Sinatra and Me | Frank Sinatra | Edinburgh Festival Fringe | Written by Shelton | |
| 2017 | Sinatra and Me (Again) | Frank Sinatra | Frankenstein Pub, Edinburgh Festival Fringe | | |
| 2018-2019 | Sinatra: RAW | Frank Sinatra | Edinburgh Festival Fringe | Written by Shelton; The Offies 2020 nomination, Best Male Performance in a Musical | |
