= Jo Stiles =

Fictional character from Emmerdale

- Emmerdale character
- Portrayed by: Roxanne Pallett
- Duration: 2005–2008
- First appearance: 26 August 2005
- Last appearance: 22 December 2008
- Introduced by: Kathleen Beedles
In-universe information
- Other names: Josephine Madonna Stiles
- Occupation: Receptionist; Barmaid; Farmer
- Mother: Jackie Stiles
- Adoptive father: Garry Stiles
- Half-brothers: Craig Stiles
- Husband: Andy Sugden (2008–2009)
- Stepdaughters: Sarah Sugden

Jo Stiles (also Sugden) is a fictional character from the British television soap opera Emmerdale, played by Roxanne Pallett. She made her first appearance during the episode broadcast on 26 August 2005 and her last appearance on 22 December 2008.

== Casting ==
Details of the character and Pallett's casting was announced on 22 July 2005. Of joining the soap, Pallett said "I'm absolutely thrilled to be joining Emmerdale. Jo is a bit of a minx and a great character for me to get my teeth into!" Series producer Kath Beedles stated that she was delighted to welcome Pallett to the cast and said her character would "turn up the heat in the village". Kris Green of Digital Spy said Jo would become the new veterinary receptionist and set her sights on Danny Daggert (Cleveland Campbell). Pallett made her debut screen appearance as Jo in August.

== Storylines ==
Jo arrives in the village as new receptionist at the vets' surgery and is soon noticed by the local men, especially Max King (Charlie Kemp) and Danny Daggert (Cleveland Campbell). Jo and Danny go on a date but they agree he is far too tame for a bad girl like her. Jo settles into her job and needing somewhere to live, moves into Connelton View with Dawn Woods (Julia Mallam) and her son, TJ (Connor Lee). After seeing chemistry between Dawn and Danny, Jo sets the pair up. However, Jo's carefree, single life inspires Dawn to quickly end things with Danny.

Jo also attempts to help her recently separated boss, Paddy Kirk (Dominic Brunt) find someone by inventing a chatroom girlfriend for him called Fireblade. Paddy books a ticket to Portugal to track down Fireblade. When Paddy returns with Toni (Kerry Stacey), Danny's cousin, Jo knows she is not Fireblade and becomes desperate to stop Toni taking Paddy for a ride. Paddy and Toni soon reveal that they were winding her up as payback.

When Dawn's ex-boyfriend, Scott Windsor (Ben Freeman) tries to seduce Jo, she rejects him but Dawn suspects there is something going on. Jo is later evicted by Dawn's mother, Jean Hope (Susan Penhaligon) due to rent arrears. Dawn then arranges for Jo to move into Butler's farm with Andy (Kelvin Fletcher) and Katie Sugden (Sammy Winward) who have recently reconciled. The arrangement is mutually beneficial to begin with as the Sugdens are struggling, but Andy and Jo begin an affair and Katie leaves when she finds out. Jo continues working at the vets but Paddy's partner Hari Prasad (John Nayagam) fires her when she uncovers his suspicious activity with customer invoices, while doing the accounts. Following Andy and Katie's separation, Andy proposes to Jo and she accepts. However, plans for their dream wedding are disrupted when Andy confesses to the fire that he started, which killed his adoptive mother Sarah (Alyson Spiro) seven years earlier and is sentenced to three years in prison. Jo and Andy are later married by a prison chaplin.

During Andy's imprisonment, Jo is harassed by Andy's former cellmate Charlie Sellers (Michael Keogh), who threatens her and Andy's daughter Sarah (Sophia Amber-Moore). Jo calls Sarah's mother, Debbie Dingle (Charley Webb) and her aunt Chas (Lucy Pargeter), who scares Charlie off with the help of the MacFarlanes, a criminal family. Soon after, Andy is paroled on appeal and calls social services about Jo adopting Sarah but is met with the news that Debbie has not completed the paperwork, much to his anger. Debbie later asks Jo for access and she lets her see Sarah. When Andy finds Sarah missing and works out that Jo is lying, he goes to retrieve her from Debbie but Jo tries to stop him and he accidentally slaps her in the process, giving her a black eye. Horrified, Andy promises never to hit her again but several more incidents occur sending Jo to the hospital. Sam Dingle (James Hooton) works out what is going on and tells his family but they don't believe him until they see a disturbing picture drawn by Sarah. After Jo confesses to Debbie, Debbie warns her if Sarah is hurt in any way, she will remove her from the farm.

To avoid further beatings, Jo lies that she is pregnant but Andy soon learns the truth and another fight ensues but Jo retaliates and shoves Andy onto an old farm tool, impaling him. Jo leaves Andy there but returns and finds Andy's brother Daz Eden (Luke Tittensor) calling an ambulance which takes Andy to hospital. When Jo tries to tell her side of the story, Andy spins the situation to make him look like the victim, and everyone believes him until Val Pollard (Charlie Hardwick) forces her sister, Diane Sugden (Elizabeth Estensen), Andy's stepmother to see the truth. Andy and Jo separate, with him moving into Woolpack. When Andy gets verbally abusive with Katie for rejecting his advances, Katie realises that Jo is telling the truth and tells her she will only be free of Andy if she leaves. Jo struggles to run the farm and look after Sarah but is helped by Debbie, neighbours Mick (John Haygarth) and Lee Naylor (Lewis Linford). Andy begins to help repair appliances until Lee discovers he has been breaking them in order to win back Jo's trust.

Realising she has to get away, Jo enlists the help of Lee to sell the farm equipment to fund the escape. Mick catches Jo leaving and she panics, locking him in the barn to prevent him from telling Andy. He begs her not to take Sarah so Jo leaves her with Debbie before departing, texting Lee telling him of Mick's whereabouts and Andy telling him to come to the farm to see what she has done as Jo is never seen nor heard from again. Jo later submits a written statement about Andy's abusive behavior when Andy and Debbie battle for custody of Sarah which prompts Andy to withdraw his application. Jo's divorce from Andy is finalised in 2009 off-screen.

== Reception ==
James Leyfield from The Irish Mirror called Jo a "raven-haired stunner".
