= Danny Daggert =

Fictional character from Emmerdale

- Emmerdale character
- Portrayed by: Cleveland Campbell
- Duration: 2001–2007
- First appearance: 25 June 2001
- Last appearance: 29 May 2007
- Introduced by: Steve Frost (2001); Kathleen Beedles (2007)
In-universe information
- Occupation: Antiques salesman
- Father: Tony McDonald
- Mother: Cynthia Daggert
- Sisters: Latisha Daggert
- Nephews: Kirk Daggert
- First cousins: Toni Daggert

Danny Daggert is a fictional character from the British television soap opera Emmerdale, played by Cleveland Campbell. He made his first appearance during the episode broadcast on 25 June 2001.

== Development ==
Danny and his family were the first black family to appear regularly in Emmerdale. Most of the family were written out in 2002, leading the actor to believe he would also be written out of the show. However, the producers asked him to stay on, which he saw as "a tremendous compliment" and found that it gave him confidence. Remarking on his character's "wild" family, Campbell felt Danny's mother Cynthia Daggert (Kay Purcell) hot-headedness could "play havoc with his life". When Julie MacCaskill of the Daily Record pointed out that he appeared to be the only sensible member of the Daggerts, Campbell said his character was "not necessarily always sensible, but at least he strives to do what is best." He summed up 2002 for his character: "All things considered, it wasn't too bad. He found stability in Emmerdale, which is in complete contrast to the life he once led. He got himself a girlfriend and a job he not only likes but he's good at." Campbell added that he wanted to leave Danny's storylines up to the scriptwriters, but suggested that he deserved to be happy with a little drama thrown in.

In June 2006, Kris Green of Digital Spy reported that Campbell would be leaving Emmerdale in August that year. Green said a show spokesperson confirmed that Campbell's departure had been planned for a while and that his character would leave as part of "a dramatic storyline". Of leaving the serial, Campbell stated: "I've had a fantastic five years on Emmerdale and made a lot of very good friends but I'm looking forward to pursuing other projects." Actress Danielle Henry, who played Campbell's on-screen sister Latisha Daggert, reprised her role in order to facilitate Danny's departure from the village. In May 2007, Campbell briefly returned for the funeral of Len Reynolds (Peter Martin). Campbell appeared in 495 episodes.

== Storylines ==
Danny and his family arrive in the village from Bradford. Danny quickly finds himself in a fight with his sister Latisha's abusive boyfriend, Paul Cooke (Lee Hartney), and later begins a relationship with local girl Ollie Reynolds (Vicky Binns). Following the departure of the other Daggerts to Lisbon, Danny decides to stay and be with Ollie, whose mother Angie has died in a car accident. Danny is a great support to her but the relationship is cut short when Ollie decides to go to University after completing her A-levels, leaving Danny heartbroken. Danny stays behind as a lodger, living with Ollie's grandfather, Len Reynolds.

Danny throws his energy into work, and impresses Rodney Blackstock (Patrick Mower), promotes him and Danny's fortunes seems prosperous. Rodney and Danny's friendship is threatened when Val Lambert (Charlie Hardwick) arrives in Emmerdale and plays them off against each other, which leads the two men to come to blows. However, they mend their friendship. Danny begins dating Donna Windsor (Verity Rushworth) for several months but they split after the romance fizzles out of the relationship and decide to remain friends. Danny has a brief dalliance with new Jo Stiles (Roxanne Pallett), but finds that her lifestyle was a bit too wild for him and they remain friends. Jo helps Danny when he realizes there was a woman for him right under his nose - single mum Dawn Woods (Julia Mallam), who he had become good friends with and there is a spark. The relationship is happy for a while but with Dawn's ex-boyfriend Scott Windsor (Ben Freeman) receiving parole, things are difficult. Eventually, Scott and Danny come to blows and Dawn decides she is better off with neither man.

Danny is later joined by his cousin Toni (Kerry Stacey), and makes friends with Dawn's brother Jamie Hope (Alex Carter). Latisha visits Danny in the summer of 2006 and offers him a job with the family in Lisbon. After analysing his life in Emmerdale, Danny decides to move on and leaves. Danny returns briefly in May 2007 for Len's funeral and comforts Len's partner Pearl Ladderbanks (Meg Johnson) before returning to Portugal.

== Reception ==
Writers from Leeds Live called the character "popular".
