= Toni Daggert =

Fictional character from Emmerdale

- Emmerdale character
- Portrayed by: Kerry Stacey
- Duration: 2005–2007
- First appearance: 7 November 2005
- Last appearance: 1 January 2007
- Introduced by: Kathleen Beedles
In-universe information
- Occupation: Barmaid
- Aunts: Cynthia Daggert
- First cousins: Latisha Daggert; Danny Daggert
- Other relatives: Kirk Daggert

Tonicha "Toni" Daggert is a fictional character from the British ITV soap opera Emmerdale, played by Kerry Stacey.

== Casting ==
Kerry Stacey portrayed the character. Stacey's casting was one of three new signings announced for Emmerdale in November 2005. Toni was introduced as the cousin of Danny Daggert (Cleveland Campbell), an already established character. In November 2006, it was reported Stacey had quit the show.

== Development ==
Toni and her family were the first black family to appear regularly in Emmerdale.

== Storylines ==
While on holiday in Portugal, Toni meets Paddy Kirk (Dominic Brunt), agrees to return to Emmerdale with him, and pretends to be his internet girlfriend, "Fireblade". The scheme is designed to upset Paddy's receptionist, Jo Stiles (Roxanne Pallett), who is attracted to the sexy stranger as a way to boost Paddy's confidence. After the joke is played out, Toni reveals herself to be the fun-loving cousin of a local boy, Danny Daggert, and settles into life in the village. She takes a job at the Woolpack after impressing landlady Diane Sugden (Elizabeth Estensen) and works behind the bar. She has a one-night stand with Ivan Jones (Daniel Brocklebank) much to Nicola Blackstock's (Nicola Wheeler) dismay. Toni sets her sights on Paddy's business partner, Hari Prasad (John Nayagam), and flirts with him, hoping for a date. Toni is oblivious to Paddy's feelings for her and when he confesses she accuses him of trying to ruin her chances with Hari. Things are awkward for a while, but they eventually come through it.

Toni regrets rejecting Paddy when he forms a close relationship with Del Dingle (Hayley Tamaddon), and she realizes she does have feelings for him and tries to win him back. Del confronts Toni in the Woolpack kitchen and warns her off Paddy. When Toni refuses, a fight ensues, and Toni is severely burned with hot fat. Despite being an accident, Paddy is horrified at Del's actions and dumps her. Toni and Paddy reconcile and eventually get engaged after Paddy proposes, but the proposal is revealed to be accidental, and they split up. Toni makes peace with both Paddy and Del before leaving.
