= Ivan Jones (Emmerdale) =

Fictional character from Emmerdale

- Emmerdale character
- Portrayed by: Daniel Brocklebank
- Duration: 2005–2006
- First appearance: 5 May 2005
- Last appearance: 2 August 2006
- Introduced by: Kathleen Beedles
In-universe information
- Wife: Jordan Jones

Ivan Jones is a fictional character from the British ITV soap opera Emmerdale, played by Daniel Brocklebank. He appeared in the series from 5 May 2005 until 2 August 2006. Ivan was originally introduced to participate in a storyline about the character of Jarvis Skelton (Richard Moore) and only meant to feature in three episodes. The serial's producers were impressed with Brocklebank and made Ivan a regular character. The character is a Geordie, which required the actor to adopt the accent. Ivan is characterised as a "good-humoured" and "charming" dustman, while Brocklebank described him as having "quite a few" love interests and stated that he has "slept his way around the village".

It was later announced that the character is bisexual and he starts a sexual relationship with Paul Lambert (Mathew Bose). Their relationship proved to be an "explosive combination" due to Ivan wanting it to remain a secret. Brocklebank has praised his storyline and spoke of his hopes that it would remove the social stigma attached to bisexuality. His sexuality is accidentally revealed to everyone he knows by Paul. Ivan is later subject to a revenge campaign after he turns down the advances of Paul's sister, Nicola Blackstock (Nicola Wheeler). She lies that Ivan has been having an affair with her, ruining his relationship with Paul. In April 2006, Brocklebank announced his decision to leave the serial to concentrate on other projects. The actor said that he had grown "very attached" to Ivan and enjoyed being a part of Emmerdale. He filmed his final scenes in June and Ivan left in August.

The character caused controversy when 126 viewers complained to television watch dog Ofcom about Ivan and Paul's intimacy. The company later cleared Emmerdale of any wrongdoing. Brocklebank said that Christian groups wrote to him condemning him to hell because of Ivan's sexuality. However, he also had letters from young lesbian and gay people who claimed that Ivan gave them the courage to be themselves. Paul Flynn from The Guardian praised his storyline involving Nicola's affair lies. Kevin O'Sullivan from the Sunday Mirror opined that Ivan was clearly gay because he was as "camp as a row of tents".

== Casting ==
Brocklebank was hired by Emmerdale to play Ivan for a three episode stint. They introduced Ivan as part of the storyline about the character of Jarvis Skelton (Richard Moore) getting too old to be a binman. Brocklebank told Roz Laws of the Sunday Mercury that the serial's producers did not intend for his character to develop, but they enjoyed his work and kept him on. They later extended his contract to last into mid-2006. Brocklebank found that taking the role gave him a "new respect" for soap opera actors because of how hard he had to work. While the actor is from Warwickshire; Ivan is a Geordie and has the regional accent. Brocklebank had to put the accent on for the role and members of the public were confused when they heard him speak in person.

== Character development ==
=== Characterisation and bisexuality ===
A writer from Emmerdale's Finnish broadcaster MTV3 described Ivan as being a "good-humoured", "dark" and "charming dustman" Ivan is revealed to be bisexual and admits his attraction to Paul Lambert (Mathew Bose). Brocklebank told a writer from So So Gay that Ivan had "quite a few" love interests and "slept his way around the village". When the actor first started the role, Ivan was straight and married. He said that it was not until eight months after he started that he was informed his character would be bisexual. Brocklebank, who is openly gay, said there was a risk of himself becoming "pigeonholed" playing a bisexual character, but added it was not something that worried him.

Ivan had previously been married to a woman and he enjoys flirting with females. One such moment is a flirtation with Jasmine Thomas (Jenna-Louise Coleman); they bond over her liking of the Brontë novels Wuthering Heights and Shirley. When Nicola Blackstock (Nicola Wheeler) confesses her attraction to Ivan, he tells her that it is her brother, Paul that he is interested in and kisses him on the cheek. Brocklebank told Laws that he had known Bose for six years prior to joining the serial and was also living with him. He said that it would be "embarrassing" if romance developed between their characters because of their friendship. However, the actor did think it was "great" to be given "such a meaty storyline". Brocklebank told a reporter from The People that he dreaded to think what his grandmother would make of the storyline. He said he was interested to receive the reaction from viewers because "it's a subject that hasn't been covered before". The actor later said that he found Ivan's bisexuality "really interesting" because he felt that it had not "really been tackled in soaps before". Brocklebank later spoke of his belief that there was "still a stigma attached to being bisexual" and his hopes that Ivan's storyline would "break some barriers" around the issue.

Ivan starts to pursue Paul and they start sleeping together. However, Ivan's lax and secretive attitude to their relationship soon annoys Paul. Bose told a writer from Inside Soap that his character is a "serial monogamist" and "has a lot of love to give". Ivan is the opposite and he has "been cracking on to all the girls in the village and Paul can't relate to that". His bisexuality and secretive nature becomes an issue for Paul; Ivan cannot offer Paul "100 per cent – physically, emotionally or spiritually, no matter how much they like each other". Paul attempts to come to terms with the situation and tries to dump him. The next time they are around each other they struggle to keep their flirtation hidden. Bose added that Ivan still "wants to do everything on the quiet", which is a "real hardship" for Paul. The dynamic of their relationship proves to be an "explosive combination". Ivan later has to decide if he is ready for a gay relationship, while Paul weighs up the risks of getting hurt by Ivan. Bose told Laura Davidson from the Sunday Mail that "whether or not Ivan is the one for Paul, I'd like to see him with someone who makes him happy."

When Paul is tormented by a group of homophobic men, Ivan steps in to rescue him. Brocklebank told Kris Green of Digital Spy that Ivan tells the men that if they have a problem they should take it out on him, not his boyfriend. This is the first time Ivan "actually vocalises it" and he is shocked because "he has ever considered anyone to be his boyfriend before". Paul then invites Ivan out for dinner with his father, but Ivan is not ready to come out. The actor said that Ivan needs more time until he feels comfortable with the situation. Ivan's ex-wife Jordan (Erin Shanagher) caught him with another man, outed him and which resulted in a "horrendous" reaction from those he knew. Brocklebank said that this causes his reluctance to come out again because "he's become scared about opening himself up to a new community of people and is worried about the villagers' reaction."

Brocklebank explained the dynamic between the two characters: Paul finds it "extremely difficult" to be in a secretive relationship because he wants different things in a relationship. When Paul does his drag act "Thelma Louise" in the local pub, he mentions that he is a secret relationship. This annoys Ivan and an argument ensues in the toilets. However, Paul has accidentally left his microphone on and Ivan is outed to the whole pub. Brocklebank said that Ivan feels "upset and betrayed" and "deep down he knows he’s bisexual but isn’t sure if a relationship is going to work with Paul" as he cannot conform to Paul's ideas about relationships.

=== Nicola Blackstock's lies ===
Ivan and Paul's relationship is tested when "scheming" Nicola attempts to seduce Ivan, despite the fact he is in a relationship with her brother. Ivan is not impressed and rebuffs Nicola's advances. Wheeler told the Sunday Mail's Davidson that Nicola trying to seduce Ivan is a "long shot" but she is not ready to give in because she has a "huge crush" on him. She added that the storyline was "hilarious" and "madness" because he is "having sex with her brother and she's still entertaining the idea of being with him". Once Nicola sees something she wants, "nothing will stop her".

Nicola sets out to seduce Ivan after an argument with her boyfriend Simon Meredith (Dale Meeks). Wheeler told Allison Maund from Inside Soap that Nicola calls Ivan for "some comfort" and they get drunk and "very cosy"; but Ivan presumes they are just good friends. Ivan gets out of the shower wearing a towel and is confronted with Nicola "dressed in her sexiest underwear". Ivan tells Nicola to stop because he loves Paul, but Simon's mother Lesley Meredith (Sherrie Hewson) walks in on them and assumes that they are having an affair. Nicola does not correct Lesley and tells her to believe what she likes and then Paul learns of the situation. Wheeler said that Nicola realises she cannot "get out of the lie now" and even tells her father, Rodney Blackstock (Patrick Mower) that she has slept with Ivan. The actress added that "Nicola's just quite pleased with the fact that she's got her own back on Ivan". He confronts her in public and asks her to tell the truth, but she "turns on the waterworks" to get everyone to turn against Ivan. Later Nicola argues with Paul and she tells him that she and Ivan have slept together many times. Wheeler said that Nicola just thinks "Sod it, I'm going to leave them all stewing". Her lies ruin Ivan's relationship with Paul, who believes Nicola's lies.

The serial later played out another chance for Ivan and Paul to be together. While interviewed by Claire Brand from Inside Soap, Bose said that Paul visits Ivan to give him back a CD he left over his house and "both of them realise that they don't have anything left to say to each other." Bose opined that Ivan and Paul were "doomed from the start" because he needed Ivan to commit. Rodney thinks that he can reunite Paul and Ivan and sets the pair up. He explained that the two had "just about got over their awkwardness with one another" and Rodney tells the whole pub that it is obvious that Paul and Ivan love each other and need to reconcile. The whole situation is "embarrassing for both of them" and Ivan is furious with Rodney's intervention. After some "soul searching", Ivan calms down and "stuns" Paul when he asks him to get back with him. Paul rejects Ivan's advances, Bose said that Paul normally likes "the big love affair" but this time gives him his "marching orders". Ivan is left heartbroken once again and decides to take some time away from the village. Bose stated that his character goes to see him off and there is a "terrible silent moment" between the two. He concluded that the audience could clearly see that Ivan and Paul were "kicking themselves" for not saying how they really feel.

=== Departure ===
"I enjoyed Ivan very much [...] Ivan and I were part of each other’s lives for two years so you grow very attached. As time goes on and more scripts are written you learn more and more about the character. I really enjoyed the complexities of playing someone bisexual who was having difficulty coming to terms with his sexuality."

— Brocklebank on playing Ivan (2010)

In April 2006, Brocklebank revealed that he had quit the role and would film his final scenes in June. He told a reporter from Inside Soap that the fact he was originally employed for a guest role; then staying for a year-and-a-half had been "great". He added that he was pleased to see Ivan depart the series on a "high note" because he had enjoyed the experience. An Emmerdale spokesperson added that the character would become "a pawn in the rivalry" between his former employer King & Sons and Matthew King (Matt Healy) and Sadie King's (Patsy Kensit) new business. In addition they planned a "romantic liaison" for Ivan which would be a "big shock to viewers and villagers alike". Ivan departed the series in August 2006 when he left to work in Costa Rica alongside fellow character Simon. Brocklebank later told a columnist from the Peterborough Evening Telegraph that he would not rule out a future return because there was "room for the character to go back". He found leaving "liberating in a way" because he wanted to pursue other projects.

== Storylines ==
Ivan arrives in the village working as a binman for "King & Sons" just after he has separated from his wife. He starts to outperform Jarvis in his new job role and has a fling with Toni Daggert (Kerry Stacey). Ivan takes an interest in Jasmine's liking of literature. He gives her a copy of the Bronte novel Shirley and she lets him buy her a drink. Laurel Thomas (Charlotte Bellamy) becomes concerned and warns Jasmine away from Ivan because of their age difference. When Nicola reveals that she is attracted to Ivan, he reveals that he likes Paul by kissing him on the cheek. Ivan and Paul soon start a sexual relationship; but Ivan does not want anyone else to know about the relationship, which Paul finds difficult. Paul grows tired of being secretive and dumps Ivan. However, when Nicola arranges a meal that they both attend, Ivan and Paul get drunk and flirt. Ivan moves in with Simon and Nicola.

Ivan goes to collect some things that he left behind at Jordan's house. Paul goes with him and takes Rodney's van. When he returns, Ivan finds the van with graffiti reading "ladyboys" and Paul surrounded by men. Ivan threatens the homophobic group with a cricket bat and tells them that he is Paul's boyfriend. Ivan is shocked that he finally admitted it to someone but still insists that they remain quiet upon returning to the village. Nicola thinks that Paul is seeing someone and attempts to find out who it is. She tells Laurel that she still likes Ivan. When Paul does his drag queen act "Thelma Louise" at The Woolpack, he makes jibes about having a secret boyfriend and drops hints. Ivan gets angry and the pair argue in the toilets, unaware that the whole pub can still hear them because Paul forgets to switch off his microphone. Ivan accuses Paul of doing it on purpose, but he eventually deals with being outed.

When Nicola feels down about Simon moving on, she decides to seduce Ivan. He rebuffs her advances but she tells Lesley, Rodney and Laurel that she slept with Ivan. When Ivan tries to get the truth, she convinces everyone else that he lying. Paul refuses to speak to Ivan and makes his father throw Nicola out of her home. She then tells Laurel that she lied about the whole thing. Laurel then tells everyone inside the pub that Nicola has lied and Ivan refuses to accept everyone's apologies. Rodney thinks that Ivan and Paul should get back together and lets the whole pub know. Ivan is annoyed but then realises he is right. When Ivan asks Paul for another chance, he turns him down and Ivan leaves the village. When he returns, Simon is annoyed with him for leaving him to pay the rent on Mulberry Cottage. He forgives him when Ivan reveals that he is just back for his job. He is made haulage manager for Matthew and Sadie's new business after they poach him. However, the job soon ends and along with Simon they leave Emmerdale for a new life in Costa Rica.

== Reception ==
A scene in which Ivan and Paul shared a kiss on a sofa sparked some controversy with viewers. 126 people complained to media watch dog Ofcom deeming the scenes to be explicit. The company later cleared Emmerdale of any wrongdoing, and a spokesperson said that "Ivan and Paul's behaviour was no more explicit than that previously exhibited by other characters in the soap. Given the inexplicit portrayal of this relationship, we consider that these scenes were acceptable." While Andy Green of the Liverpool Echo said "Paul and Ivan's fumble on the sofa was probably the steamiest pre-watershed gay scene ever shown on mainstream TV." Brocklebank told So So Gay's reporter that Ivan's bisexuality storyline had a "huge effect" on the viewers. He revealed that he had received "a lot" of letters from Christian groups telling him that he would go to hell for kissing another male on pre-watershed television. However, he also received many from young gay and lesbian teenagers who had thanked him for "making it easier to come out" because they had someone to relate to. He added that "the majority was very positive" feedback and felt happy to know that his portrayal had helped people face their sexuality.

On Ivan and Paul intimacy, Imogen Ridgway of the Evening Standard said that "Emmerdale was never this racy when my gran used to watch it". She mocked Ivan's plan to keep his relationship a secret because the village is full of gossips. Suzanne Kerins of the Sunday Mirror reported that viewers were "not impressed" when the "bisexual binman" shared a kiss with Paul. Ivan was labelled as a "hunky binman" by Jane Simon from the Daily Mirror and the Sunday Mercury's Laws, the latter branded his relationship with Paul a "surprising Emmerdale storyline". Kevin O'Sullivan from the Sunday Mirror opined that "Paul's reluctant bisexual binman lover Ivan the Terrible Queen is as camp as a row of tents". He added that Nicola was a "numbskull" with a "useless" gaydar for not realising Ivan liked men. Fiona Wynne of the Daily Mirror said that Paul tried hard to get Ivan out of the closet but "he's hanging on so tightly by his fingertips he's going to get splinters".

A writer from the Yorkshire Evening Post opined that Ivan and Paul being confronted by homophobic thugs was a "dramatic moment" that made for a "gripping start to 2006" in Emmerdale. Paul Lang from Lowculture said that he was enjoying the serial because of Ivan's outing. He added that everyone wanted the two men to get together, "even if Paul is a fucking nightmare and Ivan is very much the wrong side of shifty." Paul Flynn from The Guardian said that Ivan was a "hot bisexual" and felt that his storyline with Paul and Nicola was "played without resorting to cheap laughter". Terry Ramsey of the Evening Standard questioned why Ivan even returned to the village after his break. The writer concluded that it was because "Emmerdale is probably the only bisexual-friendly village in Yorkshire".
