= The Bill series 24 =

The Bill
- Series 24
- No. of episodes: 88

Release
- Original network: ITV
- Original release: 2 January – 31 December 2008

Series chronology
- ← Previous; Series 23 Next → Series 25

The 24th series of The Bill, a British television drama, was the third-from-last series of the programme. On 2 April 2014, The Bill Series 24 Part 1 and 2 and The Bill Series 24 Part 3 and 4 DVD sets were released in Australia.

== Theme ==
The series continued the approach from the previous year in merging procedural policing drama with personal lives being touched upon, but one change from the norm saw plots focused on the perspectives of the victims or their community, while the show also moved onto more hard-hitting issues including online grooming ("Closing the Net" Parts 1 and 2), domestic terrorism ("Frontline"), knife crime ("Walk on By") and human trafficking ("Forgotten Child" Parts 1 and 2). The biggest plot was the 8-part Witness plot, which epitomised both modern issues and community impact, a plot in which young mother Carly Samuels – who bonded with Sergeant Dale Smith in the previous series – was killed in a drive-by shooting. The plot focused on the grief of her mother Leanne as well as the police's attempts to break down barriers with the local community; it also provided inspiration for Smith's mission to take down a gang of gun traffickers in a 5-part summer plot where he went undercover as a gun runner. The show's bolder plots led to their first-ever BAFTA win for Best Recurring Drama early in 2009.

== Controversies ==
The first half of the year saw the show involved in a number of off-screen controversies: in January, show bosses axed original episode star Jeff Stewart (PC Reg Hollis), who at the time was the show's longest-serving character. The devastation of losing his role after 24 years led Stewart to attempt suicide by slashing his wrists on the set. Hollis was not given an on-screen exit as a result, instead resigning off-screen following the death of PC Emma Keane in the show's 3-part Frontline plot. Two months after the Stewart controversy, the show came under fire once more for creating a false MS treatment drug for a plot involving a doctor's suspicious death, an MS charity dubbing it "grossly irresponsible". In May, the show was hit with a libel claim by MP George Galloway for his claims the show created a corrupt MP in his likeness in the 2007 plot Moving Target; the case was later settled away from the media spotlight as no resolution was publicised.

== Anniversary ==
In the autumn, The Bill celebrated its 25th anniversary with scenes aired in Germany as part of a crossover with Leipzig Homicide to investigate the abduction of a German national in London. There was also a special documentary hosted by Martin Kemp, "The Bill Made Me Famous", featuring interviews with the most famous guest stars to have featured on the show including Roger Daltrey, Lynda Bellingham and Les Dennis, along with a number of past and present characters from the show. As well as the aforementioned scenes filmed in Germany, The Bill also filmed special scenes in Glasgow for the episode Demolition Girl, attending the demolition of The Gorbals tower block for a plot involving PC Sally Armstrong and PC Benjamin Gayle.

== Cast changes ==
In addition to the controversial dismissal of Jeff Stewart, the show also wrote out 6-year veteran Roberta Taylor after the actress resigned from her role as Inspector Gina Gold, the once iron-fisted character crumbling over fears she would face the death of another officer; the aforementioned death of Emma Keane that caused Gold's breakdown would be the last time the show killed off a police officer character before production ended two years later. Gold's role was taken by Waking the Dead and Casualty alumna Claire Goose, who was cast as Sergeant Rachel Weston following the abrupt resignation of Gillian Taylforth as Sergeant Nikki Wright, Taylforth taking time to be with her daughter after she was seriously injured in a car crash the year before; Weston featured in less than a dozen episodes as sergeant before promotion to replace Gold. The show also cast four new PCs in the summer following several exits from the uniform cast, while CID were bolstered by Patrick Robinson as former teacher and lawyer's husband DC Jacob Banks and Lucy Speed as ex-undercover specialist DC Stevie Moss, the latter of whom took on several major plots including three stints undercover, the last of which saw her centre stage in a forbidden romance plot opposite Coronation Street actor Bill Ward, who was cast for four episodes as drug runner Rob Towler.

=== Arrivals ===
- DC Stevie Moss ("The Deadly Game"–)
- CSE Eddie Olosunje ("Deadly Cocktail"–)
- DC Jacob Banks ("R.I.P. P.I."–)
- PC Leon Taylor ("New Blood"–)
- PC Millie Brown ("New Blood"–)
- PC Arun Ghir ("New Blood"–)
- PC Mel Ryder ("Gun Runner: Trigger Happy"–)
- Sgt Rachel Weston ("Street Kid"–)

=== Departures ===
- PC Diane Noble – Transfers to a county force to spend time with her son
- PC Emma Keane – Killed in bomb blast
- PC Reg Hollis – Resigns (off-screen) after the death of Emma Keane
- Sgt Nikki Wright – Resigns after not being able to balance work and family life
- Insp Gina Gold – Retires after nearly losing several officers and the death of Emma Keane

== Episodes ==
#	Title	Episode Notes	Directed by	Written by	Original air date	Prod #
1	"The Deadly Game"	First appearance of DC Stevie Moss; Jamie Davis, Marc Elliott and Danny Webb guest star	Paul Wroblewski	Gregory Evans	2 January 2008	570
New DC Stevie Moss joins Carter, Webb and Perkins as they investigate a hit and run on a motorcyclist. The stolen car is found in possession of two teenage joyriders, both of whom are cleared of the hit and run, although one inadvertently confesses to a plan to blackmail the car's owner, footballer Gem Archer. Archer's girlfriend alibis him, while her father and Archer's agent, Ernie Rosen, tries to distance his client from the investigation. When he becomes prime suspect, Rosen confesses, but is he telling the truth?
2	"Shadow Stalker"	Laura Pyper and David Sibley guest star	Paul Wroblewski	Frank Rickarby	3 January 2008	571
Armstrong goes undercover at a pub when investigating two attempted sexual assaults on student and barmaid Mandy Glover. She takes a massive risk when she pursues a suspect in the IRV after having three drinks working behind the bar, leading to a reprimand from Stone. When Glover's therapist is arrested chasing her from the pub, he is cleared of the assault, but their work is not in vain, as it is revealed that he has a penchant for voyeurism involving his clients. Meanwhile, Walker discovers a recently released rapist she arrested in the past, Kevin Mallory, lives in the area. Her investigations lead her to Mallory's flatmate Ronnie Raines, who is arrested after being linked to a series of thefts. Walker finds evidence linking Mallory to the assaults on Mandy, but she is attacked by him while trying to make the arrest. Can the team find her before it's too late?
3	"To Catch a Killer"	Katy Cavanagh, Richard Cant and Niky Wardley guest star	Karl Neilson	Julian Perkins	9 January 2008	576
4	"To Catch a Killer"	Katy Cavanagh, Richard Cant and Niky Wardley guest star	Karl Neilson	Julian Perkins	10 January 2008	577
Part One: CID jump into action when Roberts and Green witness an 11-year-old boy, Dean Clark, being abducted from a shopping centre. A clue left at the scene suggests a connection to notorious child killers Alistair Haig and Linda Johnson, but the former is dead and the latter is in prison. Manson visits Johnson with Turner; she is not interested in helping, but later calls Manson and requests to see him alone. She tells him about her boyfriend, Mike Wilson, and explains that they split, and he claimed he would prove that he loved her. Wilson's flat is raided, and clippings from the original case are found plastered all over his walls. He confesses to murdering Dean when arrested, but the biggest twist is yet to come when Dean calls his mum. Part Two: The media go crazy and the public is outraged when Linda Johnson's role in the hunt for Dean Clark is exposed. A ransom note is delivered to the station asking Johnson to do the drop, and she is taken out of the prison to do so, but it turns out to be a trap as the brother of one of her victims ambushes her. While in hospital, a clue leads Johnson to a boy who would've been her and Haig's first victim; almost 20 years after his abduction, could a victim have become a kidnapper himself?
5	"Witness"	Temporary departure of DI Neil Manson, final regular appearance of Leanne Samuels; Josette Simon, Aidan J. David, Nigel Betts and Ace Bhatti guest star	1 and 2 – Tim Leandro, 3 and 4 – Ben Morris, 5 and 6 – David Holroyd, 7 and 8 – Steve Kelly	1 – Tom Needham, 2 and 8 – Maxwell Young, 3 and 4 – Chris Murray, 5 – Julia Wall, 6 – Emma Goodwin, 7 – Jonathan Rich	16 January 2008	558
6	"Witness"	Temporary departure of DI Neil Manson, final regular appearance of Leanne Samuels; Josette Simon, Aidan J. David, Nigel Betts and Ace Bhatti guest star	1 and 2 – Tim Leandro, 3 and 4 – Ben Morris, 5 and 6 – David Holroyd, 7 and 8 – Steve Kelly	1 – Tom Needham, 2 and 8 – Maxwell Young, 3 and 4 – Chris Murray, 5 – Julia Wall, 6 – Emma Goodwin, 7 – Jonathan Rich	17 January 2008	559
7	"Witness"	Temporary departure of DI Neil Manson, final regular appearance of Leanne Samuels; Josette Simon, Aidan J. David, Nigel Betts and Ace Bhatti guest star	1 and 2 – Tim Leandro, 3 and 4 – Ben Morris, 5 and 6 – David Holroyd, 7 and 8 – Steve Kelly	1 – Tom Needham, 2 and 8 – Maxwell Young, 3 and 4 – Chris Murray, 5 – Julia Wall, 6 – Emma Goodwin, 7 – Jonathan Rich	23 January 2008	560
8	"Witness"	Temporary departure of DI Neil Manson, final regular appearance of Leanne Samuels; Josette Simon, Aidan J. David, Nigel Betts and Ace Bhatti guest star	1 and 2 – Tim Leandro, 3 and 4 – Ben Morris, 5 and 6 – David Holroyd, 7 and 8 – Steve Kelly	1 – Tom Needham, 2 and 8 – Maxwell Young, 3 and 4 – Chris Murray, 5 – Julia Wall, 6 – Emma Goodwin, 7 – Jonathan Rich	24 January 2008	561
9	"Witness"	Temporary departure of DI Neil Manson, final regular appearance of Leanne Samuels; Josette Simon, Aidan J. David, Nigel Betts and Ace Bhatti guest star	1 and 2 – Tim Leandro, 3 and 4 – Ben Morris, 5 and 6 – David Holroyd, 7 and 8 – Steve Kelly	1 – Tom Needham, 2 and 8 – Maxwell Young, 3 and 4 – Chris Murray, 5 – Julia Wall, 6 – Emma Goodwin, 7 – Jonathan Rich	30 January 2008	562
10	"Witness"	Temporary departure of DI Neil Manson, final regular appearance of Leanne Samuels; Josette Simon, Aidan J. David, Nigel Betts and Ace Bhatti guest star	1 and 2 – Tim Leandro, 3 and 4 – Ben Morris, 5 and 6 – David Holroyd, 7 and 8 – Steve Kelly	1 – Tom Needham, 2 and 8 – Maxwell Young, 3 and 4 – Chris Murray, 5 – Julia Wall, 6 – Emma Goodwin, 7 – Jonathan Rich	31 January 2008	563
11	"Witness"	Temporary departure of DI Neil Manson, final regular appearance of Leanne Samuels; Josette Simon, Aidan J. David, Nigel Betts and Ace Bhatti guest star	1 and 2 – Tim Leandro, 3 and 4 – Ben Morris, 5 and 6 – David Holroyd, 7 and 8 – Steve Kelly	1 – Tom Needham, 2 and 8 – Maxwell Young, 3 and 4 – Chris Murray, 5 – Julia Wall, 6 – Emma Goodwin, 7 – Jonathan Rich	6 February 2008	564
12	"Witness"	Temporary departure of DI Neil Manson, final regular appearance of Leanne Samuels; Josette Simon, Aidan J. David, Nigel Betts and Ace Bhatti guest star	1 and 2 – Tim Leandro, 3 and 4 – Ben Morris, 5 and 6 – David Holroyd, 7 and 8 – Steve Kelly	1 – Tom Needham, 2 and 8 – Maxwell Young, 3 and 4 – Chris Murray, 5 – Julia Wall, 6 – Emma Goodwin, 7 – Jonathan Rich	7 February 2008	565
Part One – Innocent Blood: Smithy reconnects with troubled mum Carly Samuels when she reports the stabbing of a local teenager, Tito Morientes. When she gives false info on Tito's attacker, Smithy discovers her boyfriend, Marlon Reed, is behind the attack, and he tries to convince her to help. Meanwhile, CID stumbles across an illegal renting racket run by one of the suspects in Tito's assault, while Roberts and Armstrong investigate a young boy who sets fires to relieve the stress of looking after his sick grandmother. Part Two – Wall of Silence: A shock shooting sees Carly Samuels gunned down on the Jasmine Allen Estate, and she dies of her injuries upon arrival to hospital. Smithy is assigned as family liaison officer to Carly's distraught mother Leanne, but it all goes wrong when a false claim Carly was a prostitute leads the CID down a blind alley. Smithy offends Leanne by asking her if the rumours were true, leading her to throw him out of her house. Carly's ex Dwayne Fox reveals Marlon Reed is a drug producer, but Dasari finds herself in the middle of a shootout as she tracks a vengeful Reed holding prime suspect Tito Morientes hostage. Part Three – Breaking Point: Leanne Samuels continues to refuse Smithy's help as her FLO when she is found trying to confront Tito Morientes at his flat. She later tells him that her psychic friend, Dawn Stanley, claims Tito was seen entering the drive-by vehicle just before the shooting. Hollis discovers the psychic was somebody Stamp met after the death of his father, but Stamp's reaction leaves her refusing to help. As Hollis and Green track down her boyfriend, an associate of Tito, Stamp apologises to Dawn in an attempt to get her to open up. She reveals the location of one of the guns, but with her boyfriend's refusal to make a statement and CCTV inconclusive, Leanne takes desperate action. Part Four – Deadly Secret: The day of Carly Samuels' funeral unfolds in chaos as Tito Morientes is arrested after a gun is fired during a brawl at the procession. A dramatic revelation leads to an unlikely new suspect, while a crucial witness comes forward naming Tito as one of the gunmen. Elsewhere, a series of robberies occur during the funeral, including at the Samuels' household, where Carly's room is ransacked. In addition to the hunt for the suspect, the Sun Hill team is left to contend with a group of vigilantes tracking the burglar. Manson takes leave to visit his son in Spain. Part Five – Protection: Meadows launches the raid on Dwayne Fox's home, while Nixon simultaneously coordinates one at Tito Morientes'. Tito is arrested, but the person thought to be Dwayne turns out to be a lodger instead. Dwayne's mother Beverley breaks his alibi, but his boss kidnaps baby Brooke, increasing the pressure on the team. Meanwhile, Alisha Danniels' phone signal puts her at the scene of the murder, and she gives another statement that reveals there was a third man in the car, turning the case on its head. Part Six – Hit & Run: Alisha Danniels is left fighting for her life when she is hit by a speeding car after being taken home from the station. A chase ensues, but the car escapes down railway lines before being found on fire. With the fire quickly extinguished, there is hope for the investigators. The car leads to two investigations as Roberts and Keane try to track down a teenager who fooled the owner in order to car-jack him. When the boy's older brother leaves mid-interview, Alisha identifies him as the driver of the drive-by car. Refusing to give a statement, Dasari and Smithy discover Alisha's dad Oscar knows where he is. As part of the forensic check of the car, bullets are found in a hidden compartment of the boot, so Carter tracks the owner in order to bust him selling them on. Part Seven – Truth & Lies: As the trial for Carly Samuels' murder kicks off, Dasari is surprised to find out that the defence barrister is her ex-boyfriend Sunil Davdra. Key witness Joel Pearce folds after being threatened inside prison, causing Smithy to beg Alisha Danniels to change her mind and give evidence. Elsewhere, Masters and Walker investigate an assault on a pregnant woman, discovering it was ordered by her street thug boyfriend, Rahim Woods. After smashing his face against a cell wall, Woods accuses Roberts of assault and is released on bail. The cases cross paths when Woods riles up the estate as Smithy, Alisha, and Oscar leave for court, with all three left in danger. Part Eight – The Final Act: Stamp and Keane race into action after finding Smithy's IRV on its side following the assault by another vehicle. Back on the estate, a full-blown riot breaks out, orchestrated by Rahim Woods and other members of the Creekside Boys gang. Heaton and Stone spearhead an attempt to diffuse the riot by arresting the ringleaders, but amidst the chaos, Roberts finds himself attacked and abducted by the street thugs, leading to a daring rescue. Evidence from the captured ringleaders changes the entire context of the Carly Samuels case, but with the trial falling apart, can the team secure justice in time?
13	"Driven to Kill"	Ralph Ineson and Trevor Byfield guest star	Matthew Whiteman	Emma Goodwin	13 February 2008	557
Gold demands a crackdown after a series of prank phone calls, but Fletcher and Wright trust their instincts when a boy calls saying his father has abducted him and his younger brother. Wright discovers the father has been depressed, and despite their insistence that all is well, tries to break down the man's deluded parents after talking to his ex-wife. Tracking him down to a childhood haunt on the edge of the River Thames, Wright takes a huge risk by getting in the man's vehicle to rescue him and his sons. Elsewhere, Stone and Stamp try to track down the group of youths behind the numerous prank calls. A potential suspect is revealed as a boy with Asperger syndrome who has been filming the boys after being bullied by them. Tracking them down, Stone decides to fight fire with fire to catch them out.
14	"Family Loyalty"	Paul Copley and Rob Spendlove guest star	Anthony Quinn	Patrick Homes	14 February 2008	572
15	"Family Loyalty"	Paul Copley and Rob Spendlove guest star	Anthony Quinn	Patrick Homes	21 February 2008	573
Part One – Pay Back: An SUV owned by known criminal Dylan Morrison is involved in a chase and crash, but the driver is a young boy called Liam Harvey. He claims his father was threatened by Morrison, and the claim may be justified when the father is found in his crashed car with puncture wounds in his back. When Morrison is attacked and found with the word 'scum' tattooed on his forehead, CID investigate and link it to a blackmail scam involving a reality TV star. Gayle, meanwhile, begins looking into Liam's mother, believing that she is the victim of domestic abuse. Part Two – Cover Up: Gayle finds Liam Harvey at the bottom of the stairs in his home, and he believes the boy's father is responsible. Connections are made when a homeless man is hit over the head with a rucksack full of bags of coke; Liam is caught on CCTV carrying the same bag, and later confesses to stealing it from his father. While CID attempts to trace the source of the drugs, Gayle tries to bring Liam's father in for questioning, but ends up assaulting him when he confesses to pushing Liam down the stairs; with Liam refusing to name his father, Gayle finds his career at risk, forcing Stone to step in.
16	"The Hit"	—	Robert Del Maestro	Sally Tatchell	27 February 2008	574
Uniform attend a hit and run; the victim leaves the scene, not the driver, but is found close by. Doctors believe blood staining his clothes is not his; Armstrong and Fletcher discover whose it really is when a friend is found nearby with a bullet wound. The first victim to be subsequently discovered to have stolen a briefcase involved in an assassination, and CO19 joins CID for a sting; as they stake out the pub owned by the intended target, Armstrong finds the assassin's car in the car park at St. Hugh's...
17	"Spilt Blood"	Laura Pyper, Daniel Brocklebank and Philip McGinley guest star	Robert Maestro	Tom Higgins	28 February 2008	575
On a Friday night patrol, Stone and Armstrong re-encounter Mandy Glover, the victim of harassment and an attempted rape a few weeks earlier. She claims her sister Kate is in a nightclub, but she is found out the back of the club and it appears she was raped; while Mandy tries to convince her to give a statement, Kate blocks it out. Meanwhile, Moss, Perkins, and Carter work with a prisoner on leave to arrest a drug dealer; he spins them a line and escapes during the raid. One person can identify his hiding location, and the dealer protecting him: Stone's rape suspect Ian Andain. With no statement of accusation, and one made as a witness, Andain is cleared. With Fletcher, Gayle, and Armstrong desperate for justice, Stone goes about finding it in his own way.
18	"Deadly Cocktail"	First appearance of CSE Eddie Olosunje; Karen Meagher guest stars	Richard Signy	Alan Pollock	5 March 2008	578
Green and Valentine interview a hungover woman who claims to have witnessed a body being dumped in the River Thames the night before; they are sceptical, but a body is indeed found by divers. The victim is Michael Drummond, a disgraced doctor who has been under investigation by the General Medical Council; he appears to have been involved in a death on duty, and is under fire from the widow of the victim. The case takes an unexpected turn when Dave Batchelor, a man seen ransacking Drummond's abandoned car, is revealed to have lost his girlfriend at a party Drummond was at in the 90s; events escalate when a friend of Drummond's is found with Batchelor holding a needle to his neck...
19	"Heat on the Beat"	Final appearance of PC Reg Hollis	Richard Signy	Si Spencer	12 March 2008	580
Green and Keane come on shift with hangovers; their day starts badly when they turn up late to a briefing, covering uniform for investigations while CID work a fraud case, and it only gets worse when Heaton volunteers to join the duo on patrol. Gold and Wright follow the trio to Canley Market, mainly so they can keep an eye on Heaton! Meanwhile, Roberts and Valentine find an abandoned electronics van, and find the driver tied up in the back. Heaton freaks out a female drug dealer when he arrests her, owing to a history of abuse. Green, Keane, and Heaton find a young boy working at his mother's stall, and two robots stolen from the van are found. The drug dealer, Rachel Compton, has her flat turned over, and her brother Matty is found assaulted, surrounded by several damaged robots. Green and Heaton find heroin in the back of one of the two that they seized. Rachel's boyfriend, James Maguire, is suspect number one, and he is being hunted down by Jaz Desai, the van's owner, wanting his drugs, and he's holding Rachel hostage.
20	"Corrupted"	Kelly George and Sian Breckin guest star	Nigel Douglas	Patrick Homes	13 March 2008	581
During a brawl at a nightclub, Armstrong encounters a police officer from another station, PC Andrew Tipping; he hands her drugs he bought undercover, and asks her to hide them. Stone finds out, after he tells Masters there were no drugs recovered. When Tipping threatens to expose Armstrong's role, Stone has to find another way to bust him. Masters looks into an OD and has to help a father determined to hunt down the dealer he claims is responsible.
21	"Break In"	—	Nigel Douglas	Will Shindler	19 March 2008	582
Smithy answers a call about a pensioner who has been attacked during a burglary, so Moss and Webb set up a sting operation involving one of her neighbours, which reveals a well-established outfit selling stolen goods on the internet. When two youths previously seen arguing with the victim are eliminated from the inquiry, the officers are left with some unlikely suspects, reminding them how deceptive appearances can be. The team later decides to set up a sting operation to trap the thief red-handed. Elsewhere, Roberts helps a tearaway to go home to his mother and escape his father.
22	"Beth Undercover"	Temporary departure of PC Beth Green; David Ajala guest stars	Roberto Bangura	Steve Bailie	20 March 2008	583
A prisoner, Katie Taylor, asks to see Green while in custody, and claims she needs to get seized drugs back to her boss. Green goes undercover, but Carter threatens to take Katie's son away if Green is harmed. Green falls for Lenny Jones, a DJ working for Earl Clarke, Katie's boss. Katie goes missing and is found assaulted. Green gets continually aggravated with Carter's attitude towards her, but helps him identify a gun she was threatened with by Clarke. Clarke's suspicions about Green go on, and he tries to ambush her, so Meadows leads a squad to bust him.
23	"Closing The Net"	Final regular appearance of PC Diane Noble; John Bowe and David Schofield guest star	Paul Wroblewski	Chris Ould	26 March 2008	584
24	"Closing The Net"	Final regular appearance of PC Diane Noble; John Bowe and David Schofield guest star	Paul Wroblewski	Chris Ould	27 March 2008	585
Part One: Keane and Valentine respond to a disturbance and find a teenager with her wrists slit. It appears she has been groomed and abused as part of an online paedophile network. When her friend goes missing, CID launches a manhunt, with Perkins looking through offenders. Dasari is seconded to the Child Exploitation and Online Protection group to work with Detective Superintendent Tom Faraday and tries to open up to professional yet compassionate Detective Inspector Phil Ashley. Just when it seems they've busted the ring, a post by a user known as 'Domino Man' promises a live feed showing the abuse of an 8-year-old boy in 24 hours. Part Two: CID and CEOPs go all out to stop the live feed abuse of the 8-year-old boy. With Det Supt Faraday, working with Heaton and CID at Sun Hill, Dasari, and DI Ashley look through the image of the victim for information about his whereabouts. Noble becomes FLO to the mother when the boy's drug addict uncle is revealed to have given a photo to the paedophile network. With the case hitting close to home, Noble requests a leave of absence to spend time with her son.
25	"Blood Rush"	—	Matt Bloom	Andrew Taft	2 April 2008	586
26	"Blood Rush"	—	Matt Bloom	Andrew Taft	3 April 2008	587
Part One: Gayle and Stamp discover the body of missing teenager Abbey Ferguson in a derelict building, dead from a heroin overdose, and the trail of evidence leads back to her pimp Danny Peters. A fellow teen prostitute claims she saw a violent client drag Abbey's body downstairs; when this turns out to be false, she is arrested and has to give up Peters, who, it transpires, killed Abbey for not sleeping with the violent punter. As Moss and Turner confront him, he arms himself with a needle. Part Two: After stabbing Turner with a needle, Danny Peters is arrested by Uniform. He claims he used a dirty needle, and Turner finds himself facing a three-month wait to discover whether or not he has HIV. Ever the professional, he shows up at work and is horrified to discover Peters is offering info on his suppliers in exchange for a reduced sentence. Moss goes undercover to catch the dealer, but it goes pear-shaped when her mobile phone, containing a tracker, is confiscated. Turner gets too involved, but Moss, instead of being annoyed, tries to prove the needle Peters used on him was clean.
27	"Sins of the Father"	Ann Mitchell and Edward and Tim Woodward guest star	Anthony Quinn	Chris Murray	9 April 2008	594
28	"Sins of the Father"	Ann Mitchell and Edward and Tim Woodward guest star	Anthony Quinn	Chris Murray	10 April 2008	595
Part One: Smithy attends the scene of an assault on an elderly man. He turns out to be Johnnie Jackson, an ex-East End gangster and bank robber. When Smithy and Carter visit Johnnie, he is visited by his grandson Jacko, and Johnnie claims he is dealing for Bosnian drugs warlord Andreas Audra. The team is perplexed why a gangster would 'grass' on his own family, but Johnnie points the team in the direction of a nightclub owned by Jacko and his love child, Roger Hutton. As Jacko is implicated in a smuggling op, Johnnie hopes they can bring down Roger. Events take a sinister twist when Jacko is found dead in Johnnie's house. Part Two: The list of suspects for Jacko Jackson's murder is long; grandfather Johnnie, who went missing, is found at the grave of his son, Ray, covered in blood, but is quickly released after his arrest. Jacko's uncle Roger is the prime suspect, but he was in custody. His girlfriend Anya Herdlitska is arrested because Jacko surrendered her to immigration. Then, Andreas Audra is arrested after being sighted when he was supposedly out of the country. Marty Baxter, who assaulted Johnnie the day before, is a major suspect, but why kill his best friend? With so many suspects to comb through, the Sun Hill team is left to ponder who could be responsible.
29	"Going Under"	Tracy Brabin and Rufus Wright guest star	Roberto Bangura	Doug Milburn	16 April 2008	579
When Roberts tackles a robber to recover a shotgun, Turner looks into a spate of violent burglaries, including one where a shopkeeper was shot dead. To catch the suspect, Meadows goes undercover with the ringleader to 'buy' stolen antiques. He clashes with Nixon over his control on the case, but is impressed with her work. When surveillance loses him, he takes a major risk by confessing his undercover status.
30	"Overkill"	Adrian Scarborough and Nina Toussaint-White guest star	Olivia Lichtenstein	Clive Dawson	17 April 2008	588
Keane and Armstrong attend a burglary; the victim claims he hit the suspect with a hammer, but five blows mean that the victim may become the person charged. Armstrong is hugely disappointed that the victim is facing prosecution, and she goes to Stone with Keane for an 'alternate' result. Stone is furious that she brought in Keane, owing to her father being a DCI with the DPS. Despite this, Keane tries to get in with Stone's gang.
31	"Private Investigation"	First appearance of DC Jacob Banks; Gordon Kennedy guest stars	1 – Olivia Lichtenstein; 2 – Simon Massey	1 – Richard Ommanney; 2 – Clive Dawson	23 April 2008	589
32	"Private Investigation"	First appearance of DC Jacob Banks; Gordon Kennedy guest stars	1 – Olivia Lichtenstein; 2 – Simon Massey	1 – Richard Ommanney; 2 – Clive Dawson	24 April 2008	590
R.I.P. P.I: DC Jacob Banks joins the Sun Hill watch in time to help Webb investigate the murder of a private detective. His recent cases are all investigated, including the disappearance of a young woman, Geraldine Lawson, who her father suspects is dead. A complicated case brings up a suspect, but he proves elusive for the CID team. Keane is left disappointed when Stone refuses to put through an application for her to go undercover on the case. City Slickers: Armstrong goes undercover at a trading centre to investigate the involvement of a group of businessmen in the disappearance of Geraldine Lawson. Keane is frustrated that Stone keeps her on routine work, but she hints to Meadows that she'd like to join Armstrong undercover for drinks with the traders, which annoys Stone. Keane takes a risk and ends up alone with one of the suspects; can the team rescue her in time?
33	"Frontline"	Final appearance of PC Emma Keane; Liz May Brice, Mark Moraghan, Lesley Nicol and Sally Ann Triplett guest star	1 – Simon Massey; 2 and 3 – Karl Neilson	1 and 2 – Sarah-Louise Hawkins; 3 – Tom Needham	1 May 2008	591
34	"Frontline"	Final appearance of PC Emma Keane; Liz May Brice, Mark Moraghan, Lesley Nicol and Sally Ann Triplett guest star	1 – Simon Massey; 2 and 3 – Karl Neilson	1 and 2 – Sarah-Louise Hawkins; 3 – Tom Needham	8 May 2008	592
35	"Frontline"	Final appearance of PC Emma Keane; Liz May Brice, Mark Moraghan, Lesley Nicol and Sally Ann Triplett guest star	1 – Simon Massey; 2 and 3 – Karl Neilson	1 and 2 – Sarah-Louise Hawkins; 3 – Tom Needham	15 May 2008	593
Part One – Shockwave: Keane and Armstrong are first on the scene when two explosions tear apart a photocopy shop and a nightclub. Stone coordinates the efforts of officers from Sun Hill and Barton Street as they deal with terrified members of the public, while their efforts are side-tracked by an electronics thief and a sexual assault suspect taking advantage of the chaos on scene, and things only get worse when Heaton receives an apparent threat about a third explosive device. After weeks of disputing, Keane accuses Stone of being bent and storms off. Keane finds an office block on fire, and when a suspect package is found in the building, she heroically puts her life on the line to get everyone out safe. Part Two – Aftershock: The relief remains in a state of shock after Keane's death the day before. In uniform, Stone expresses his guilt to Gold before unleashing his fury on Smithy. In CID, SO15 DI Karen Lacy comes in to head up the investigation. The first two bombings are linked to a porn racket, while Webb discovers the third bombing was targeting a racist businessman. An emotional Armstrong opens up to Stone over the loss of her best friend Keane, leading her to try to attack a suspect. When a bomb is found in his neighbour's back garden, Walker finds herself standing on a pressure pad that arms a bomb. Dasari makes a breakthrough that could be imperative to the case. Part Three – End Game: Another bombing occurs during a routine call for uniform, detonating in front of Armstrong. Luckily, the flour bomb does not harm her and was used to leave a clue for SO15 and CID. Dasari's theory about the bombings proves true, they are related to 'the Four Evils of the Internet': pornography, racial hatred, identity theft, and paedophilia. A memory stick found at the flour bomb site claims a paedophile will be blown up in four hours. Stone returns to work after his attack on Smithy and tries to catch Keane's killer, bypassing her funeral to catch the bomber in the act. When the intended victim's wife is found with a bomb in her car, Meadows and Dasari try to stop the suspect from detonating it before Stone can rescue a baby from the car.
36	"Lucky Lucky Lucky"	Return of DI Neil Manson; Nicky Ladanowski guest stars	David Innes Edwards	Chris Dunn	22 May 2008	597
Manson returns to Sun Hill after visiting his son in Spain. He pairs with Moss and investigates an assault and disappearance involving a wedding groom. Manson finds himself being flirted with by a gay club owner, and arrests a Kylie Minogue impersonator, not without Moss grabbing a photo! The recently arrived DC bonds with her new boss when she realises he had an indifferent visit with his son, with Manson overhearing that Turner bet Moss £20 that she could find something personal out about him. Morale in uniform takes another downturn when Gold reveals Hollis has resigned following the death of Keane, and she stresses the importance of recruiting new uniformed officers to Heaton.
37	"Running Scared"	Peter-Hugo Daly guest stars	David Innes Edwards	Emma Goodwin	29 May 2008	596
Wright and Valentine find a teenage boy, Alfie Eagen, assaulted on his way to school. Wright becomes attached to the boy, and is horrified when drugs are found in his room following a burglary at his home. His father, Carl, just released from prison, is bringing trouble and the drugs are believed to be his. Along with debts with a loan shark, Jason Dawes, he has also been in dealing wars with local skinhead Lucas Walsh, suspect number one for Alfie's assault. When Dawes gives CID Carl's address, he is found dead in a bathtub full of compost. Walsh is arrested and confesses to the assault and burglary, but denies killing Carl. Masters finds a homeless informant she used to know, Sammo Taylor, and he helps in the inquiry, on condition that they retrieve his missing ferret. Alfie runs away and is arrested for dealing, but he denies killing his father. With Walsh, Dawes, and Alfie all in the frame, CID ponder who was responsible, but Olosunje reveals new evidence that suggests they have an unlikely suspect.
38	"Cowboy Country"	—	Richard Signy	Frank Rickarby	4 June 2008	598
While driving back to the station from court, Perkins and Carter find themselves stuck in traffic owing to roadworks. At a set of temporary lights, screams are heard; when they investigate, two men are seen stealing a Mercedes, and the owner is stabbed to death. Nixon arrives, but lets Carter lead. The suspects are Polish, so Carter reaches out to the community. Despite lying, which offends Perkins, priest Pavel Rudzinski identifies the suspects as brothers Stefan and Feliks Adamski. Carter's loyalty to Rudzinski compromises the evidence, and after they fight inside the station, they are separated by their colleagues and reprimanded by a furious Nixon. Stefan's girlfriend, Halina Lesnik, agrees to meet him so he can be arrested, but Feliks intervenes, and he is abducted. When he is assaulted, he is found at Father Rudzinski's and agrees to give information on his brother.
39	"We Are Family"	Return of PC Beth Green; Joe Absolom and Sharon Duce guest star	Nigel Douglas	Tom Higgins	5 June 2008	604
40	"We Are Family"	Return of PC Beth Green; Joe Absolom and Sharon Duce guest star	Nigel Douglas	Tom Higgins	11 June 2008	605
Part One: Upon return to Sun Hill after going on the Undercover Training course, Green teams up with Armstrong. The pair finds a man, Alan Marlowe, beaten up in an alleyway of a known red light district. CCTV shows him arguing with a young girl, who turns out to be his stepdaughter Lucy Burton; she is remanded in custody, but quickly bailed. When her mother confesses to the assault, Lucy intervenes and admits she assaulted her stepfather; she explains to Green that Marlowe threatened to attack her mother every time she tried to contact her, but her mother will not make a statement. Armstrong tells Green she thinks she got too involved with Lucy. Part Two: Lucy Burton is found dead under an overpass, and the first question for CID is, was it an accident, suicide, or murder? Olosunje's findings prove she was dead before she went over the bridge. The main suspects are her polygamist boyfriend Mark Lawrence, who makes it blatantly obvious he's covering something up when he goes missing and torches his car, and her stepfather Alan Marlowe, whose history of domestic violence to her mother was revealed by Lucy the day before. When Mark is found to just be obsessed with his girlfriends, girls on the run with nothing, and Marlowe is alibied, the team hit a brick wall in the investigation, leading Green to visit the girls again.
41	"New Blood"	First appearances of PCs Millie Brown, Leon Taylor and Arun Ghir	Richard Standeven	Patrick Homes	12 June 2008	660
Probationers Millie Brown and Arun Ghir join Sun Hill, along with newly transferred PC Leon Taylor. Taylor and Valentine are paired together, while Ghir teams up with Roberts. Masters interviews a man called Malcolm Myers, who thinks he has people in his home. Masters believes Myers is paranoid, but when Taylor finds a tunnel in the basement of Myers' squat, they discover the path was used by notorious armed robber Colin Dempsey, who has used it to break in and rob a bank across the road. Dempsey is further implicated by a man arrested for robbing a hardware store, and he identifies that he was hired by Dempsey to steal an oxy-hydro cutter.
42	"Landfill Killer"	—	Richard Standeven	Chris Murray	25 June 2008	661
Brown and Ghir find a body in a landfill. Manson leads the investigation into the death. It appears the victim, Adele Jones, had a sordid love history. With a boyfriend, an ex, and even her brother implicated, CID find themselves with too many suspects to get a clear picture. Adele had an argument with another man before her death, and he is suspect number one. He is cleared, meaning there may be a different motive for the killing altogether.
43	"Gun Runner"	First appearance of PC Mel Ryder; Daniel Caltagirone, Martin Reeve, Andreas Wisniewski and Rupert Hill guest star	1- Richard Signy, 2 and 3 – Indra Bhose, 4 and 5 – Tim Leandro	1 – Gregory Evans, 2 – Sally Tatchell, 3 – Patrick Homes, 4 and 5 – Steve Trafford	2 July 2008	599
44	"Gun Runner"	First appearance of PC Mel Ryder; Daniel Caltagirone, Martin Reeve, Andreas Wisniewski and Rupert Hill guest star	1- Richard Signy, 2 and 3 – Indra Bhose, 4 and 5 – Tim Leandro	1 – Gregory Evans, 2 – Sally Tatchell, 3 – Patrick Homes, 4 and 5 – Steve Trafford	3 July 2008	600
45	"Gun Runner"	First appearance of PC Mel Ryder; Daniel Caltagirone, Martin Reeve, Andreas Wisniewski and Rupert Hill guest star	1- Richard Signy, 2 and 3 – Indra Bhose, 4 and 5 – Tim Leandro	1 – Gregory Evans, 2 – Sally Tatchell, 3 – Patrick Homes, 4 and 5 – Steve Trafford	9 July 2008	601
46	"Gun Runner"	First appearance of PC Mel Ryder; Daniel Caltagirone, Martin Reeve, Andreas Wisniewski and Rupert Hill guest star	1- Richard Signy, 2 and 3 – Indra Bhose, 4 and 5 – Tim Leandro	1 – Gregory Evans, 2 – Sally Tatchell, 3 – Patrick Homes, 4 and 5 – Steve Trafford	10 July 2008	602
47	"Gun Runner"	First appearance of PC Mel Ryder; Daniel Caltagirone, Martin Reeve, Andreas Wisniewski and Rupert Hill guest star	1- Richard Signy, 2 and 3 – Indra Bhose, 4 and 5 – Tim Leandro	1 – Gregory Evans, 2 – Sally Tatchell, 3 – Patrick Homes, 4 and 5 – Steve Trafford	16 July 2008	603
Part One – Trigger Happy: Banksy, Valentine, and Gayle are first on scene when a young boy, Emile Grover, is found with a loaded gun; Banksy talks him down, and it is identified as an army-issued Browning high power pistol. Emile identifies the man who gave him the gun as Andrew Tyrell, while Captain Charlie Shaw of the Army identifies the owner of the gun as ex-Corporal Billy Figgis. Conveniently, Smithy and new PC Mel Ryder have already dealt with Figgis, who has been harassing his estranged wife, but after holding them hostage with a replica handgun, he goes missing. Billy's wife reports their son Josh missing, and Billy is arrested on suspicion of abduction, but he reveals Tyrell is holding Josh so he can get more weapons. Events spiral when Emile's father, Henry Grover, reports his son missing, and he was last seen with Josh Figgis. Part Two – Undercover: Suspected gun runner Andrew Tyrell mentions supplier Billy Figgis has been working with Kieran Wallace, a thug converting firearms for an as yet unknown kingpin. With nerve damage from the stabbing by Tyrell, Figgis agrees to introduce Smithy to Wallace. After a shaky start, Smithy gets an in and prepares to go deep undercover, with Moss acting as his girlfriend as a way of contact. Meanwhile, after Roberts arrests a woman involved in a hit and run, Bansky discovers she was sexually assaulted in her home. The main suspect is a disgruntled ex-boyfriend, but after he is implicated despite having an alibi, it raises the question, who'd agree to rape someone for a friend? Part Three – Kick Off: The relief are tasked with providing security for a football match between Millwall and Leyton Orient at The Den. With Smithy attending alongside Kieran Wallace, Fletcher and Green find another issue: a stolen case of volatile fireworks being set off by kids. With rival intelligence claiming the Orient fans would welcome the home fans with a bang, uniform have to go all out to find the rest. Gold goes into meltdown when Ryder is nearly killed when the vehicle full of fireworks explodes, but she carries on when she and Fletcher have to take a woman in labour to hospital in the transport van. Smithy, meanwhile, loses his cool with one of the gang, which impresses ringleader Darren Cutler. Part Four – Spray and Pray: Smithy finds himself holding a gun that Wallace claims was used in a shooting. Moss recovers the gun, which CID subsequently links to the murder of an ex-con, but Smithy spends the entire day concerned that his cover will be blown if they are unable to bring it back. Carter suggests setting up Wallace to plant the gun, and when Wallace is arrested, Smithy finds himself looking down the barrel of Cutler's gun. He is also introduced to Bob Gatting, the boss of the SE1 gang, organising security and cash for the deal. Cutler meets the supplier under surveillance at his workshop, leaving Carter convinced the team is on the brink of a potential massive result. Part Five – Firefight: The day of the big gun deal arrives, but Smithy spends the day fighting to recover it. Wallace is bailed after his arrest, and while Gatting is determined to get to the truth, Smithy manages to maintain his cover by sacrificing Wallace, who is thus subject to a vicious beating by Gatting's thugs. Cutler, furious with the assault on his nephew, threatens to pull the deal, but Smithy gets it back on course. Things get worse when Interpol reveals that the supplier, Dimitri, is really Osip Kolchek, a major Russian human trafficker suspected of killing a buyer in a drug deal that he double-crossed. Unaware of who he's dealing with, Smithy accompanies Gatting and Cutler to a test run of a Mac 10 with Kolchek. As the deal is finalised, Wallace shows up at the workshop demanding answers; Smithy convinces Wallace that the assault was down to Cutler, so Wallace steals a Mac 10 and goes after his uncle, who, unbeknownst to Smithy, is at the local pub with Moss. Stuck between getting the guns off the street and stopping a mass shooting, Smithy goes after Wallace, leading him to take drastic action.
48	"Jack of Hearts"	Alex Beckett guest stars	Robert Knights	Andrew Alty	17 July 2008	606
Meadows' godson calls to collect his father after a poker game at the DCI's home, only to then be knocked down in a hit-and-run incident outside. Meadows assumes he was the target, and clashes with Banksy and Webb, who suspect that one of the DCI's friends may have been the intended target. Meadows is shocked to discover how little he knows his oldest friends when one of them is implicated in criminal activity.
49	"Body of Evidence"	Robin Soans and Kim Thomson guest star	Robert Knights	Andrew Rattenbury	23 July 2008	607
Webb and Banksy investigate a suspicious house fire, and Webb is surprised when he discovers the homeowner is an old informant of his. The prime suspect is the victim's landlord, who worked with the victim in the past. Events take a bizarre twist when, during forensic searches, Olosunje finds human remains in the basement. The victim is identified as a squatter who went missing in the 1970s; the big question is who did it? Webb is drawn to the landlord's solicitor, Naomi Woods, but is left embarrassed when Banksy reveals she is his wife.
50	"Lifesaver"	Lorraine Stanley and Lin Blakley guest star	Robert Del Maestro	Nicholas McInerny	24 July 2008	608
Gayle and Armstrong attend an RTC in which a teenage girl, Caitlin Haris, has been run over. The alleged driver, Ryan Davison, is found with alcohol in his system, and later confesses after being positively identified by Kim Yates, a woman on the scene when Caitlin was hit. After initially saying she is Caitlin's mother, then confessing she lied, an assault on Caitlin's grandmother reveals that Kim really is Caitlin's mum. When Armstrong and Gayle interview Caitlin about the hit and run, she works out that Kim is her mum and goes missing. Stamp and Gayle track her boyfriend down, who later guides them to Caitlin. When Kim is bailed, she is found by the River Thames. Armstrong negotiates to get her out of the car, but when she refuses and speeds into the river, Armstrong and Stone dive in, leaving Gold horrified as her two officers and the car disappear under the water's surface.
51	"Teacher's Pet"	David Sterne guest stars	Robert Del Maestro	Sally Tatchell	30 July 2008	609
Uniform attend a burglary and find the victim, a schoolteacher, has been assaulted. Two of his students are implicated after being found in possession of cash belonging to him, but they are cleared of assault, and the victim is then implicated in the disappearance of another student. Meanwhile, Ghir and Brown look for his car and, after speaking to another man whose car has been stolen recently, they uncover a car theft ring. With the help of Stamp, they set a trap at a car wash, allowing Ghir and Brown to make their first major arrest since joining Sun Hill.
52	"Seize the Day"	Final appearance of Sergeant Nikki Wright; Martin Jarvis and Javone Prince guest star	Anthony Quinn	Steve Bailie	31 July 2008	611
While on patrol on the Antrim Green Estate, Fletcher and Wright witness businessman Lesley Downey get impaled by a scaffold pole dropped on his car from a tower block. Fletcher informs CID, and Manson notices his knack for investigatory work. A passenger, local youth Anthony Watt, is interviewed, but his brother Damon tries to keep him quiet. Wright sits with Lesley, and they discuss their families, but Wright is devastated when she is told Lesley can't be rescued. He tells Wright he fears dying alone and asks to see his brother and Anthony to make peace before he dies. After Downey's death, an emotionally distraught Wright hands in her resignation, while Manson offers Fletcher a transfer to CID.
53	"Street Kid"	First appearance of Sergeant Rachel Weston	Anthony Quinn	Simon Spencer	6 August 2008	610
New sergeant Rachel Weston arrives at Sun Hill and begins by investigating a robbery at a jewellery shop with Walker and Webb. After a pursuit, the robbers abandon their bike and light it on fire, but are involved in an RTC with a car. The van involved has a history of crime after being stolen five years earlier, and it is believed it was used as a rental for criminals. When a boy involved in the crash is found with stolen jewellery, Ryder discovers he was in the van and is not the car driver's son. The case is turned on its head when it appears she is the sister of the shop owner and that she and her husband were the robbers, not the van drivers. The van occupants claim they are looking after the boy when he ran away from his abusive father; when he goes missing, it appears his father is not just holding his son.
54	"Blind Alley"	PC Will Fletcher begins an attachment with CID; Liza Walker guest stars	Diana Patrick	P.G. Morgan	7 August 2008	612
A young woman, Paula Merrick, is found unconscious in an alleyway. During a chase by Roberts, a suspect drops a stun gun, and, when signs suggest she was raped, Nixon takes charge of the investigation. Nixon's suspect is male stripper Tom Norris, who the victim admits to a one night stand with the night before; Norris confirm this, but denies rape and forensics are not strong enough to charge him. Meanwhile, Fletcher's first job on attachment to CID sees him paired with Perkins to look for a supplier of the stun guns.
55	"Getting Personal"	Liza Walker and Beau Brady guest star	Diana Patrick	Stuart Morris	14 August 2008	613
After a chase with a stolen car, Brown and Roberts discover the body of a female in the boot; she is identified as an Australian expat living with her boyfriend, another Aussie. When CCTV of her at a club appears, she is seen talking to rape suspect Tom Norris; Nixon wastes no time in arresting him on suspicion of murder. Brown looks for the elusive driver, and manages to convince her that she can be a witness if the theft charges are dropped.
56	"Game Plan"	Shaun Williamson, Liz May Brice, Jonathan Coy and Blake Harrison guest star	Richard Signy	Julian Perkins	19 August 2008	614
57	"Game Plan"	Shaun Williamson, Liz May Brice, Jonathan Coy and Blake Harrison guest star	Richard Signy	Julian Perkins	20 August 2008	615
Part One: While on operation at the docks to arrest thieves, Meadows is stopped by Karen Lacy, now an Intelligence Officer with the Serious and Organised Crime Agency. She convinces Meadows that his theft operation, based around dock boss Dave Monks, is small fry; she has him under surveillance for 60 kilos of cocaine bound for the docks. Carter, working undercover, has to warn one of the thieves, Dave's son Pete. Accomplice Tom Harris agrees to give Meadows and Lacy evidence after he is arrested. For his help, Dave Monks agrees to give Carter more work. Green goes undercover in the Monk's club with Dave's daughter Chloe, but Meadows and Lacy spot Dave telling Pete to kill Chloe's boyfriend and business partner, Asif Perreira. Pete bottles it, and Asif goes into protective custody; Green blows her cover with Chloe to gain her trust and takes her to Asif. Carter tips off Meadows about a bust, but Dave set it up as a decoy run. Meanwhile, Turner gets a clean bill of health after being stabbed with a hypodermic needle a few months earlier. Part Two: As Pete Monks stews in custody and Tom Harris lies in St. Hugh's, Lacy, Meadows, and Carter weigh up their options; Carter suggests alienating Dave from his children. Anthony, who appeared to be Tom's boyfriend, was likely to know that his father ordered the beating on Harris; as expected, he tells his father he loves Tom and tells him he can do the deal alone. Chloe calls Dave, explaining Pete bottled it and Asif is alive, before telling him she is carrying Asif's child and they're moving away from London. Dave confronts Pete and tells him he is finished with him. With just Carter left to trust, Dave decides to go get the coke once Carter leads him to the wire he planted in the office. As Carter and Dave go for the coke, Green calls Meadows to say an angry Pete is looking for Carter, and he's armed with a handgun.
58	"Unnecessary Heroics"	Victoria Alcock guest stars	Reza Moradi	1 – Chris Smyth; 2 – Chris Murray	21 August 2008	616
59	"Unnecessary Heroics"	Victoria Alcock guest stars	Reza Moradi	1 – Chris Smyth; 2 – Chris Murray	26 August 2008	617
Part One – Demolition Girl: While on cordon duty for a high-rise demolition, Armstrong is approached by a woman, Sian McGuire, who claims her son is in the block. When this turns out to be a lie after a search, Sian claims her diary is inside detailing a rape at the hands of her uncle, Graham Boyce, when she was a child. Gold agrees to arrange a delay to the demolition, on the condition that Sian makes a statement against Boyce; when the diary is not found, the demolition goes ahead. As alarms ring, signalling the demolition, Sian runs at the block, chased by Armstrong; as the building collapses, the pair are nearly crushed to death. Masters and Moss take charge and decide to arrest Boyce and go for a confession; this goes better than expected when the missing diary is recovered from his shed. As Armstrong gets reprimanded by Gold for interfering with the interview, she goes to get drunk with Gayle, but her actions at the end of the evening lead to disaster. Meanwhile, Taylor and Stone look for a missing pedigree dog. Part Two – Over the Limit: Armstrong awakens at the wheel of her car after a head-on collision while drunk. Gayle takes her out, disposes of her keys, and gives paramedics a false name. He then calls Stone, and he and Armstrong hide out at his place, while Stone keeps an eye on the investigation. A passenger of the other car, a 15-year-old girl, is found next to the car, possessing coke. The owner's son confesses to illegally driving the car, but CID thinks he's covering for his sick father, after he has an angina attack. When questions about Armstrong persist, Stone suggests she go into the station.
60	"The Fall"	Jackie Clune and James Clyde guest star	Olivia Lichtenstein	Tom Needham	28 August 2008	618
61	"The Fall"	Jackie Clune and James Clyde guest star	Olivia Lichtenstein	Tom Needham	3 September 2008	619
Part One – Before: Weston and Valentine attend a serious assault in which a drug dealer has been brutally assaulted and has jaw broken in a hammer attack. Weston tries to get the victim to talk, while Dasari looks for a suspect. A teenager, Jay Newman, is brought in, but has to be bailed for his own safety when it is revealed he is witness protection. After Dasari tears him apart in interview, he agrees to help her out. The fallout has disastrous consequences however, when he is later found dead at the bottom of a tower block. Part Two – After: Dasari and Manson investigate the death of Jay Newman. A relative of the man he put behind bars is a suspect, as is loan shark and assault suspect Les Cooper, but when both are cleared, the team begin to suspect it may have been suicide all along. Dasari feels a sense of guilt after pressuring Jay into giving evidence against Cooper. Weston continues to work on the hospitalised dealer to get info, and a breakthrough comes when it emerges he has had a visitor; the man tries to flee town, but is caught after crashing his car after a pursuit with the Area Car. Manson tries to open up Dasari's emotions.
62	"Secret History"	Tracey Wilkinson and Kim Thomson guest star	Paul Wroblewski	1 – Simon Moss; 2 – Len Collin	4 September 2008	622
63	"Secret History"	Tracey Wilkinson and Kim Thomson guest star	Paul Wroblewski	1 – Simon Moss; 2 – Len Collin	10 September 2008	623
Part One: Brown and Ghir respond to an assault in a car park, the victim of which turns out to be Banksy's wife, Naomi Woods. The suspect, Bobby Henshaw, is after retribution, Woods having defended Alistair Finch, a driver who killed Bobby's brother Michael in an RTC a few months earlier, and who was cleared of wrongdoing in court. Banksy tries to get Bobby's parents to open up, but his mother, Judy, blames him for Michael's death. His associate Gavin Wishart points CID in the right direction. When Banksy goes home to speak to Naomi, he finds Bobby holding a knife to her throat. Part Two: Banksy and his wife are quickly alibied for the serious assault on Bobby Henshaw. Alistair Finch is questioned by Brown and Ghir, and quickly provides an alibi too; Gavin Wishart is arrested after fleeing from Stamp and Gayle, but he too is found to be innocent. Nixon and Banksy reopen the Michael Henshaw case and discover that Alistair Finch was having an affair with none other than Judy Henshaw. After a disturbance at Finch's office, Judy tells Nixon that Finch had Michael killed so he would not reveal the affair. Nixon assures Naomi that nothing is going on between her and her husband, while both women get ready for the Tom Norris trial, with Woods the defence barrister for Norris.
64	"Trial and Error"	Temporary departure of DI Samantha Nixon; Kim Thomson, Liza Walker and Wunmi Mosaku guest star	Karl Neilson	1 – Maxwell Young; 2 – Chris Smyth	11 September 2008	620
65	"Trial and Error"	Temporary departure of DI Samantha Nixon; Kim Thomson, Liza Walker and Wunmi Mosaku guest star	Karl Neilson	1 – Maxwell Young; 2 – Chris Smyth	17 September 2008	621
Part One: The trial of Tom Norris for rape and murder begins, with Banksy's wife Naomi Woods as defence counsel. Witness Fallon Thomas runs from Brown and Green when they go to pick her up to bring her to court. Rape victim Paula Merrick suffers a dose of nerves and is found out of her face on vodka, but Ryder cleans her up and brings her to court. She is torn apart on the stand, and is then found in the bathroom talking to fellow witness Sophie Oduya. Naomi witnesses the incident, and the judge declares a mistrial owing to possible police orchestration of collusion between witnesses. Nixon issues a warning to Norris about witness intimidation, but a call comes in about an assault in the same alleyway where Paula was found, leaving Nixon horrified that Norris has restarted his crimes. Part Two: Nixon goes all out to find Tom Norris, convinced he is responsible for the rape that occurred after he was bailed. Banksy goes to Naomi for advice, and her off-the-record digging brings interesting new evidence to light. When he returns to CID, a furious Nixon tells him he needs to consider his future at Sun Hill; she storms off and Banksy follows and confronts her in the bathroom, claiming her personal opinion of Naomi is compromising her role in the case. With Banksy's findings, the two work out that Dan Cox is also involved and may be the only culprit. When Norris cannot be found, Cox is hunted down by the team to see if they can get a location on Norris, the eventual discovery of whom finally unravels the three cases.
66	"Funny Money"	Alibe Parsons and JoAnne Good guest star	David Innes Edwards	Roger Gartland	18 September 2008	624
Stone, Smith, and Gold arrest two children caught on CCTV stealing from a DVD store, and find them in possession of not only stolen DVDs, but also fake £50 notes. Gold discovers severe bruising on the boy's back, and suspects his aunt has been beating him as well as making him steal to order; she is arrested, but is quickly bailed. The boy's estranged father helps the team in the investigation and tries to rekindle their relationship. Gold lies about seeing the aunt with a gun so that she can scare her and get the location of the supplier, then threatens to resign in the debrief with Heaton.
67	"Appropriate Force"	Brian Croucher guest stars	David Innes Edwards	Patrick Homes	24 September 2008	625
When a suspicious woman trying to withdraw money from her bank account is arrested, her husband and kids are found tied up and doused in petrol. Stone strongly suspects Glenn Donovan, a villain from his past, is responsible, but only an associate, Alan Duncan, can be placed at the scene. When the team goes to arrest him, however, they find he has fled, having apparently been tipped off; when the victim is seen on the front office phone, he reveals Donovan threatened him and his family. Donovan's house is raided, and Stone finds that Donovan's wife, Stone's ex-girlfriend, has been attacked. Smith attempts to arrest Donovan, who resists, and Stone intervenes and knocks him unconscious. Smithy argues with Gold over her handling of the fracas with Donovan, and inadvertently tells her to resign.
68	"An Honour to Serve"	Final appearance of Inspector Gina Gold; Christopher Colquhoun guest stars	Robert Knights	Frank Rickarby	25 September 2008	626
69	"An Honour to Serve"	Final appearance of Inspector Gina Gold; Christopher Colquhoun guest stars	Robert Knights	Frank Rickarby	2 October 2008	627
Part One: With Roberts, Taylor, and Weston off sick, Heaton steps in to help the depleted relief. Stone, Valentine, Brown, and Gayle attend a stabbing; the victim, Jake Quinn, claims his girlfriend Nicola's husband, Gerrard Parry, was responsible. When Stone and Brown go to his home, he makes a quick escape. Nicola claims Jake's the one obsessed with her, rather than the other way round, as he claimed, but there are more phone calls to Jake than from. When Gerrard is found, he denies the stabbing, and forensics subsequently prove that Jake may have stabbed himself. At his work, Smithy and Gold find a gun holder in his locker, and CCTV sees him leaving with Nicola and Gerrard's daughter Sophie. As Smithy and Gold trace the pair to Sophie's school, Jake is found waving a gun around. Part Two: As a gunshot rings out at the school, Jake Quinn uses Smithy's radio to claim he has shot him, leaving his colleagues, Gold especially, concerned. Heaton sets up a negotiation, which Gold puts Stone and Armstrong in charge of; speaking to Stone, Jake demands to see Nicola Parry or he'll kill all hostages and himself. Weston shows up, despite being sick, and goes in disguised as a paramedic to rescue a hostage having an asthma attack. When Smith makes contact, the team plans to fool Quinn with the promise of Nicola, so that CO19 can go in undercover. Gold decides, after months of cracking under pressure, to resign after thinking Smithy had been shot.
70	"Hide and Seek"	Sergeant Rachel Weston is promoted to Inspector; Alice Coulthard guest stars	Indra Bhose	Matthew Bardsley	8 October 2008	630
In her first case as Inspector, Weston sets up a raid on a crack den, with uniform working alongside Manson and CID. Taylor makes a bond with a female user, who goes all out to protect her child, found unattended during the raid, but she will not give up her supplier for fear of losing her. She claims her ex-husband is the supplier, but she blows her chances by trying to flee with the drugs during a raid. Taylor is reprimanded after Weston catches him sympathetically letting the suspect escape during the raid, while Fletcher gets his first informant.
71	"First Strike"	James Buckley and Nicola Cowper guest star	Indra Bhose	Will Shindler	9 October 2008	631
While attending a disturbance, a teenager collapses on Taylor and Weston's IRV with stab wounds. Fletcher works the case with Dasari on the last day of his secondment in CID; he expresses an interest in staying in the department, so Dasari suggests that he should prove his worth with a good result. Fletcher feels compromised, however, when an allegation of dealing is made against the victim. Meanwhile, Taylor and Stamp investigate when a woman is burgled after being mugged a few weeks earlier. The two cases collide when the burglary victim turns out to be the mother of two brothers claiming responsibility for the stabbing; are they covering each other, or is it for somebody else?
72	"Hold Me Tight"	TDC Kezia Walker becomes a fully fledged DC; Stephen North, Richard Wisker and Janine Wood guest star	Richard Standeven	Lizzie Mickery	15 October 2008	628
73	"Hold Me Tight"	TDC Kezia Walker becomes a fully fledged DC; Stephen North, Richard Wisker and Janine Wood guest star	Richard Standeven	Lizzie Mickery	16 October 2008	629
Part One: Uniform starts a search party for a missing eight-year-old, Bethany Riley, with Valentine assigned as FLO. Ghir finds her body a few miles from her school. Suspicion first falls on her father, who is significantly older than his wife, and who has a dodgy alibi. Suspicion then falls on school football coach Ryan Kemble, whose van was seen nearby when Bethany vanished. When one of her blazers is found in his van, he is arrested. Camera footage suggests that Ryan's son, Mason, a fellow pupil at Bethany's school, has a fixation on her, but is he capable of murder? Part Two: With the video footage of Mason Kemble picking up a bracelet belonging to Bethany, CID feels they have enough evidence to arrest him on suspicion of murder. Dasari and Manson do the interview, but Mason is a hard person to crack. As Dasari gets close, he shuts down. Walker and Gayle find new evidence that seemingly confirms Mason's guilt, but whether he meant to kill Bethany or not remains unclear. After losing her temper in interview, Dasari reaches out to Mason's distant father, Ryan, the only person he craves attention from, to see if they can open him up.
74	"The Rookie"	PC Will Fletcher is promoted to TDC; Zoë Henry and Tim Dantay guest star	Jamie Annett	Patrick Homes	22 October 2008	634
Ryder and Roberts attend a suspected burglary; the occupant is found to be missing, and a fire is subsequently discovered at the construction site he is in charge of. The security guard is sketchy, as he fails to mention criminal damage and a cemented drain, discovered by the foreman. Fletcher, working his first case as a TDC, finds himself under pressure from Turner for a first-day result; he bonds with the family, but then finds himself having to arrest the victim after new evidence suggests he is committing fraud. To make amends, he goes undercover to ensnare a loan shark, putting the family under pressure.
75	"Fools Rush In"	Theo Barklem-Biggs guest stars	Jamie Annett	Clive Dawson	23 October 2008	635
When Brown and Ghir come across a carjacking, they discover a group of thugs have been kidnapping people on a local estate; CID uncover that the gang have then been robbing the friends and family of the victims. Chasing a suspect, Ghir ends up in a crowd of yobs and has belt and equipment stolen; Roberts, Brown, Ryder and Smithy band together with him to arrest the thugs. After witnessing a fight between Brown and Ghir while arresting a suspect, Ryder reports Ghir, who gets a roasting from Smithy. A breakthrough finally comes when a captured gang member claims a wannabe gangster is doing the kidnappings to impress one of the thug's sisters and overthrow the ringleader.
76	"Loved and Lost"	Bel Powley, Philip Barantini and Faye Daveney guest star	Matt Bloom	Sally Tatchell	30 October 2008	636
Stone and Taylor attend to a report of a missing fifteen-year-old; the girl is found unconscious in an alleyway, and Taylor forms a bond with her emotional father, explaining that he lost his girlfriend in an accident six years earlier. It appears that a boyfriend may be responsible, but the case ends up being far more confusing than it appeared to be.
77	"Walk on By"	—	David Holroyd	Stuart Morris	5 November 2008	638
Roberts and Ryder are called to a stabbing on a bus and find the victim being attended to by Holly Perkins. She works with Roberts after making a statement; after the victim subsequently dies, it emerges he was involved in attacking the suspect a few weeks earlier. The suspect angrily confronts a witness to both attacks, but will Holly be the right person to negotiate when she gets there first?
77a	"The Bill Made Me Famous"	—	Reza Moradi	Stuart Morris	5 November 2008	638a
Martin Kemp tells the story of some of the famous faces who have made guest appearances on The Bill to celebrate its 25th anniversary. Rock legend Roger Daltrey, actress Pauline Quirke, comedian Les Dennis and TV personality Paul O'Grady talk about roles that change their careers; Oxo mum Lynda Bellingham talks about her only villain role, and Kemp's fellow ex-EastEnders star Michelle Collins explains how The Bill kick started her career. Christopher Ellison, and other ex-EastEnder Billy Murray and Kemp's former EastEnders colleague Todd Carty talk about their previous roles as police villains, and new girl Rhea Bailey talks about starting her acting career on the show as PC Mel Ryder, with honourable mentions to stars such as Hugh Laurie, James McAvoy and a ten-year-old Keira Knightley.
78	"In Deep"	Elize du Toit and Ian Burfield guest star	David Holroyd	Steve Bailie	6 November 2008	639
When a woman is thrown from a cab at St. Hugh's surrounded by bags of cocaine, Perkins goes undercover with the cab firm to look into their criminal activities. He ends up being partnered with the team's main suspect, Alan Brady, but saves him from a group of thugs to earn his trust. Company boss Jimmy Thompson subsequently asks to deliver a package to Brady's address, which turns out to be a letter bomb; after doing so, Perkins is let in by the two cabbies on a surprise job the next morning.
79	"Proof of Life"	Crossover episode with Leipzig Homicide; Rocky Marshall, Ulrich Matthes and Ian Burfield guest star	Robert Maestro	Steve Bailie	12 November 2008	640
80	"Proof of Life"	Crossover episode with Leipzig Homicide; Rocky Marshall, Ulrich Matthes and Ian Burfield guest star	Robert Maestro	Steve Bailie	13 November 2008	641
Part One: Perkins goes on the 'big job' with cabbie Alan Brady; as they're parked up, Brady points a gun at a teenager and shoves her in a cab. Hajo Trautzschke and Ina Zimmermann of Leipzig PD arrive when it appears the victim, Charlotte Fischer, is a German national. Trautzschke's brute tactics annoy Meadows, especially when he manhandles Perkins in a raid on the hideout. Jimmy Thompson has already taken Charlotte away, so Perkins follows him to Piccadilly Circus. Both Charlotte and Jimmy run off; Jimmy is arrested by CO19, but Perkins and Charlotte go missing, kidnapped by the ringleader. He reveals his name as Viktor Hauptmann, and he is meeting a computer hacker, Hans Muller, at London City Airport. Trautzschke arranges for an undercover cop, Jan Maybach, to swap with Muller. As soon as Perkins leaves with Jan, the gang gets on a plane bound for Germany. Part Two: Hauptmann arrives in Germany with Perkins, fellow undercover officer Jan Maybach, and kidnap victim Charlotte Fischer. After landing, Hauptmann says he will kill the person who tipped off the police back in Britain, but instead mistakenly kills mercenary Carson. When Charlotte's parents arrive in Leipzig, with German and British officers in tow, Hauptmann sets up a drop, a decoy so he can steal jewels from a courier firm. When Charlotte's mother is revealed to be having an affair with a worker at the courier firm, it seems that this is the motive for the kidnapping, and it was arranged by her stepfather to get back at her mother. Hauptmann's computer expert is arrested, but Maybach escapes with Perkins, and they lose their tail owing to recklessness from Perkins. Realizing how reckless Perkins was leads the SOKO team to deduce that Charlotte is in danger.
81	"One Day, But Not Today"	Race Davies guest stars	Sallie Aprahamian	Tom Higgins	27 November 2008	642
Stamp takes Roberts on a driver training course, in preparation to go on the Area Car driver training course. They attend an RTC, where a young girl has been hit by a stolen car. Roberts loses the car in pursuit, while Smithy looks for the owner. The owner claims he got it recently from a dealership. When a recent string shows that spare keys are being used to steal stolen cars, a warehouse is discovered. With the door panels off the cars, a bag is found full of drugs. A sting is set up as the owner brings in a new shipment from Cyprus. Stamp teaches Roberts a vital lesson when a troubled father cuts his wrists.
82	"Forgotten Child"	Warren Brown guest stars	Gill Wilkinson	Chris Murray	10 December 2008	644
83	"Forgotten Child"	Warren Brown guest stars	Gill Wilkinson	Chris Murray	11 December 2008	645
Part One: Masters is on scene when a pub landlord discovers the body of a teenage prostitute, Kelly Porterfield; her ex-boyfriend, Andy Donnelly is a suspect for her fatal overdose. His new girlfriend, Jen Kilshaw, is obviously underage as well, so Masters focuses on getting her away from Andy; she also promises Kelly's mum that she will bring down whoever is responsible. Walker, Heaton, and Masters look at two overdoses, including Kelly's, and a chain of locations where the girls came from and ended up, and fear that a sex trade operation is spreading across the UK, and Andy appears to not be the main suspect in Kelly's murder or the smuggling operation. Part Two: Masters continues her investigation into a people smuggling operation and the murder of Kelly Porterfield; Jake Clegg is the prime suspect in both, and appears to be working with Glasgow-based Scotsman Logan Hunter. An increasingly frustrated Masters loses it with Clegg in interview and he makes a formal complaint, for which she is reprimanded by Heaton. But worse is to come when Jen Kilshaw goes missing from her residential unit and Masters fears she is heading for a swap with Hunter. Donnelly is assaulted by Clegg, whose car, fitted with a tracker by Webb, is later found abandoned. Can Masters get to Jen on time?
84	"Santa's Little Helper"	Bill Ward and Francis Magee guest star	Diana Patrick	Sally Tatchell	17 December 2008	646
When several houses are burgled, it appears that a criminal family working out of a Christmas grotto is getting people to give their address so they can be burgled while shopping. Santa, Peter Garrett, who has previous form for burglary, is the prime suspect, and his daughter Lisa is caught red-handed when Turner reluctantly allows his flat to be used for a sting. Lisa says she did it to pay off some debt her father had with loan shark David Crossley before he went to prison; Crossley is caught red-handed by Moss and Turner with a fake passport, and agrees to set up his associate 'Robert', who is fleeing the country, to get time off his sentence. Moss tells Turner to pull the op when she recognises the target as drug dealer Rob Towler, whom she encountered while she was undercover with SO10 in 2005.
85	"Too Hot to Handle"	Bill Ward, Michael Nardone, Aisling Loftus and Eamon Boland guest star	1 – Diana Patrick; 2 and 3 – AJ Quinn	1 – Chris Dunn; 2 and 3 – Patrick Homes	18 December 2008	647
86	"Too Hot to Handle"	Bill Ward, Michael Nardone, Aisling Loftus and Eamon Boland guest star	1 – Diana Patrick; 2 and 3 – AJ Quinn	1 – Chris Dunn; 2 and 3 – Patrick Homes	22 December 2008	648
87	"Too Hot to Handle"	Bill Ward, Michael Nardone, Aisling Loftus and Eamon Boland guest star	1 – Diana Patrick; 2 and 3 – AJ Quinn	1 – Chris Dunn; 2 and 3 – Patrick Homes	23 December 2008	649
Part One: Moss sets up an OBBO on Rob Towler, but when nothing happens overnight, Turner suggests she go back under. Moss's former SO10 handler, DS Jim Rutherford, comes to Sun Hill from Greater Manchester Police to help with the case, which takes an unexpected turn when Fletcher discovers that Towler's associate Gordon McArdle was actually responsible for a GBH that Towler did time for. When Moss sees McArdle at Towler's before a drug deal is meant to go down, she realises he is being set up; she voices this to an uninterested Turner and has to intervene herself. Part Two: With a gang member and CO19 officer down, Moss and Rob Towler speed off on a bike, chased by the gang and the police; Gayle and Ghir call in to say they lost both targets, before Turner receives a cryptic call from Moss but is quickly cut off. Desperately searching for his colleague, Turner is eventually led to a storage unit, where he finds Moss and Towler, only for Moss to pull a gun on him. Turner is grounded, but ignores the order and continues his search; when he finds Towler and Stevie at Towler's father's home, Towler's father is shot. When Moss and Towler flee, Turner finds himself suspended. Part Three: Moss turns up at Turner's flat begging for help and explains how she and Towler had been hunted down by the Tameside Crew. Including the incident at the storage unit and the chase from the drug deal, ambushed by CO19, she tells all of the events of the last 24 hours. She explains most of the incidents, including Turner's suspension, were caused by her protection of him from Rutherford, inside man for Malky, boss of the Tameside Crew. Turner calls Meadows to set up Rutherford, when they give a 'location' for where Moss and Towler are to set up an ambush by CO19. Moss is left to choose between Rob and her work.
88	"Second Chance"	—	Tim Leandro	Len Collin	31 December 2008	652
New Year's Eve. Ryder's first New Year's shift starts late when she has to help her brother Jordan, visiting from Leeds. Attending a stabbing at a nightclub, Jordan is found covered in blood, and his girlfriend Kelly is found having been attacked in the bathroom. The victim goes into cardiac arrest at midnight, but survives, and Valentine grows close to the mother. Ryder fears Jordan is protecting Kelly, as she had his knife, but they are both ruled out, leaving CID scratching their heads, looking for suspects.
