= Ed Stone Is Dead =

- Directed by: David Kerr
- Starring: Richard Blackwood; Daniel Brocklebank; Bill Paterson; Claudie Blakley
- Country of origin: United Kingdom
- Original language: English

Production
- Executive producers: Lisa Opie, Christopher Pilkington
- Producer: Rachel Freck
- Cinematography: Francis De Groote
- Editors: Charlie Phillips; James Thomas

Original release
- Network: BBC Choice
- Release: 6 October 2002

Ed Stone Is Dead was a 2002 BBC sitcom starring Richard Blackwood, Daniel Brocklebank, Bill Paterson, and Claudie Blakley. It centers on Ed Stone (Blackwood) who is accidentally killed by the grim reaper Nigel (Paterson) and becomes half-dead.

The show ran for a single season with 13 episodes, each 30 minutes long.

It was later repeated on Trouble.
