= Proof of Life (The Bill) =

Storyline on the TV series The Bill

- Crossover event
- PHK Hajo Trautzschke and POK Ina Zimmermann from SOKO Leipzig with DCI Jack Meadows from The Bill

Part 1: The Bill
- Episode title: "Proof of Life: Part 1"
- Episode no.: Season 24; Episode 79
- Directed by: Robert Del Maestro
- Written by: Steve Bailie; Geoff McQueen
- Original air date: November 12, 2008

Episode chronology
← Previous "In Deep"	Next → "Proof of Life: Part 2"

Part 2: The Bill
- Episode title: "Proof of Life: Part 2"
- Episode no.: Season 24; Episode 80
- Directed by: Robert Del Maestro
- Written by: Roland Heep; Geoff McQueen
- Original air date: November 13, 2008

Episode chronology
← Previous "Proof of Life: Part 1"	Next → "One Day, But Not Today"

Part 3: Leipzig Homicide
- Episode title: "Entführung in London"
- Episode no.: Season 1 Episode 10
- Directed by: Robert Del Maestro
- Written by: Frank Koopmann; Roland Heep; Steve Bailie
- Original air date: September 4, 2009

Episode chronology
← Previous "Im Schafspelz"	Next → "Das nette Mädchen"

"Proof of Life" (German: Entführung in London) is a two-part storyline from the long-running Thames Television series The Bill to celebrate the 25th anniversary of its pilot, "Woodentop". Both episodes came as part of a crossover with the German police drama SOKO Leipzig. It serves as the 79th and 80th episode of The Bill's 24th series, and as the season premiere for season 10 of Leipzig Homicide. While The Bill's rendition aired in November 2008, Leipzig Homicide's did not air until September 2009. The episodes were filmed in English, and dubbed into German for broadcast on ZDF. A different edit was shown in each country.

== Prelude ==
The events of the two-parter are built up to in The Bill's previous two episodes, Walk on By and In Deep. The first of those saw the return of Florence Bell as Holly Perkins, the daughter of DC Terry Perkins, who was last seen in 2006. Holly tried in vain to help a dying teenager stabbed to death on her bus, and her help in solving the murder case saw her tell Terry she wanted to join the police force. In the second of those episodes, Terry was troubled by Holly's comments as he investigated a woman who was dumped out of a car outside the hospital who had several bags of cocaine on her person. Terry and DC Mickey Webb learned she had been buying off taxi manager Alan Brady, so Terry was sent undercover by DCI Jack Meadows at the company, Thompson & Ray. After impressing Brady by rescuing him from his drugs supplier's thugs, Terry was asked to work on a "big job" a day later.

== Synopsis ==
The day of the "big job" dawned when DC Terry Perkins was asked to drive Brady to the riverside, where he abducted a teenage girl at gunpoint. Back at Sun Hill, Superintendent John Heaton alerted DCI Meadows to events when a police director in Germany told them a German woman staying in a London hotel, Helen Wegner, had reported her daughter Charlotte Fischer missing. When Jack arrived to the hotel with DCs Mickey Webb and Kezia Walker, they met Leipzig based officers Hajo Trautzschke and Ina Zimmermann, who had flown in at Helen's request alongside her husband Karl. When CCTV showed Terry near the abduction, Jack arranged a raid on Thompson & Ray, where Alan Brady was arrested. However, Charlotte had already been taken by company boss Jimmy Thompson (Ian Burfield) to Piccadilly Circus. SO19 caught Thompson fleeing as both Terry and Ina went after Charlotte; Thompson's contact Nick Carson intervened in the pursuit before taking Terry and Charlotte away at gunpoint with the man who organised the kidnapping. When Terry came to, the ringleader identified himself as Victor Hauptmann. As he briefed Terry on his operation, Terry swiped Carson's phone to tell the Sun Hill team about Hauptmann and where he was located. When Hajo learned a new player was entering the gang that Hauptmann had never met, he arranged for the man's place to be taken by his officer, Jan Maybach. As Terry met Jan at the airport, he left a note for Mickey stating where he was staying. When Hauptmann, Carson, Terry and Jan headed for an airfield to fly to Leipzig, a raid occurred on Hauptmann's hideout, and a video feed alerted him to the fact he had a traitor in his ranks.

In part two, Hauptmann mistook Carson for the traitor and had him shot dead, then called the Wengers and told them the undercover cop in the gang had been killed. With an ID not confirmed, Jack took Mickey and Kezia to Germany as Hajo and Ina returned to Leipzig. When Kezia and Ina found Carson's body, a photo on his phone revealed Helen Wenger kissing another man. Helen admitted her new lover worked as a courier for a high-value shipment firm, and the team learned Hauptmann had colluded with Helen's scorned husband Karl to rob the company whilst the police searched for Charlotte, Hauptmann admitting to Terry he was trying to steal government owned jewels he stole for the East German Stasi back in the 80s. When Jack and Hajo wrongly assumed Charlotte was safe and ordered the team to be arrested, Terry panicked and fled with Hauptmann and Jan – knowing Charlotte truly was in danger. When Karl cracked and revealed where Hauptmann was hiding, the team conducted a raid, but despite Terry's cover being blown he was able to disarm Hauptmann. Charlotte escaped in the chaos and shot Hauptmann's right-hand man Dennis after he tried executing her, before being talked down by Jan. Jack and Hajo thanked one another before the Sun Hill team flew home, and when Terry returned to London he was met by daughter Holly. She was scared to learn the full extent of his undercover role, but was still not swayed by the idea of becoming a copper – which made Terry decide to give her his blessing.

== Cast ==
=== Main ===
Character	Actor
DCI Jack Meadows	Simon Rouse
Hajo Trautzschke	Andreas Schmidt-Schaller
DC Terry Perkins	Bruce Byron
Jan Maybach	Marco Girnth
DC Mickey Webb	Chris Simmons
Ina Zimmermann	Melanie Marschke
DC Kezia Walker	Cat Simmons

=== Recurring ===
==== From The Bill ====
Character	Actor	Parts
PC Nate Roberts	Ben Richards	1-2
Supt. John Heaton	Daniel Flynn	1
Holly Perkins	Florence Bell	2

==== From Leipzig Homicide ====
Character	Actor	Parts
Patrick Grimm	Tyron Ricketts	2

=== Featuring ===
Character	Actor	Parts
Viktor Hauptmann	Ulrich Matthes	1–2
Charlotte Fischer	Anna Maria Mühe	1–2
Helen Wegner	Birge Schade	1–2
Karl Wegner	Max Herbrechter	1–2
Marlowe	Tom Frederic	2
Dennis O'Leary	Tim Chipping	2
Nick Carson	Rocky Marshall	1–2
Jimmy Thompson	Ian Burfield	1
Alan Brady	Harry Capehorn	1
Bank assistant	Thomas Büchel	2
