= Release (film) =

- Directed by: Darren Flaxstone; Christian Martin
- Written by: Darren Flaxstone; Christian Martin
- Starring: Daniel Brocklebank; Garry Summers; Bernie Hodges; Wayne Virgo
- Release date: 2010
- Running time: 87 minutes
- Country: United Kingdom
- Language: English

Release is a 2010 British film starring Daniel Brocklebank, Garry Summers, Bernie Hodges and Wayne Virgo. The film was written and directed by Darren Flaxstone and Christian Martin.

== Plot ==
Father Jack Gillie enters prison a guilty man, convicted for a crime that sees the Church abandon him, his congregation desert him and his faith challenged. His fellow inmates believe he's been convicted of pedophilia and begin to plant the seed of doubt into the mind of his teenage cellmate, Rook. After rescuing Rook from a beating Jack now becomes the inmates prey. Protection comes in the unlikely form of a prison officer, Martin with whom Jack falls in love and together they embark on a dangerous and illicit affair behind cell doors. As trust forms between the two men so Jack feels enabled to confess the truth behind the crime for which he has been imprisoned. Emboldened by Jack's honesty the two men plan their lives together post Jack's release.

Prison gang leader Max, however has ulterior objections and sets about ruining this relationship and manipulates the Governess, Heather, into suspending Martin for misconduct after disclosing the affair. Alone and vulnerable Jack is now tormented and hunted by Max who takes revenge on him for his crime.

Waking from the near fatal actions of Max, Jack keeps his head down and bides his time comforted by letters of love and support from Martin - delivered with disgust and loathing by one of Martin's colleagues. With the end of his sentence in sight Jack readies himself for a new life and a new beginning with Martin. The only obstacle to this remains Max and Father Elliott the Church's messenger sent to establish what Jack's intentions are once free. Before Jack walks out of prison, Rook, who is high on substance given by Max, stabs him in the chest, using a sharpened wooden cross.

== Cast ==
- Daniel Brocklebank as Father Jack Gille
- Garry Summers as Martin Crane
- Bernie Hodges as Max
- Wayne Virgo as Rook
- Dymphna Skehill as Heather
- Oliver Park as prisoner

== Release ==
Release was released in 2010 and had played at LGBT film festivals worldwide including: Sydney Mardi Gras, Melbourne Queer Film Festival, Vertzaubert Queer Film Festival, Miami Gay and Lesbian Film Festival and Philadelphia QFest.

== Reception ==
On review aggregator website Rotten Tomatoes the film has a score of 14% based on reviews from 7 critics, with an average rating of 3.9/10.

Jeannette Catsoulis of The New York Times described Release as "a predictable yet poetic reflection on faith, hypocrisy and the weight of conscience".
