= Daniel Brocklebank =

English actor

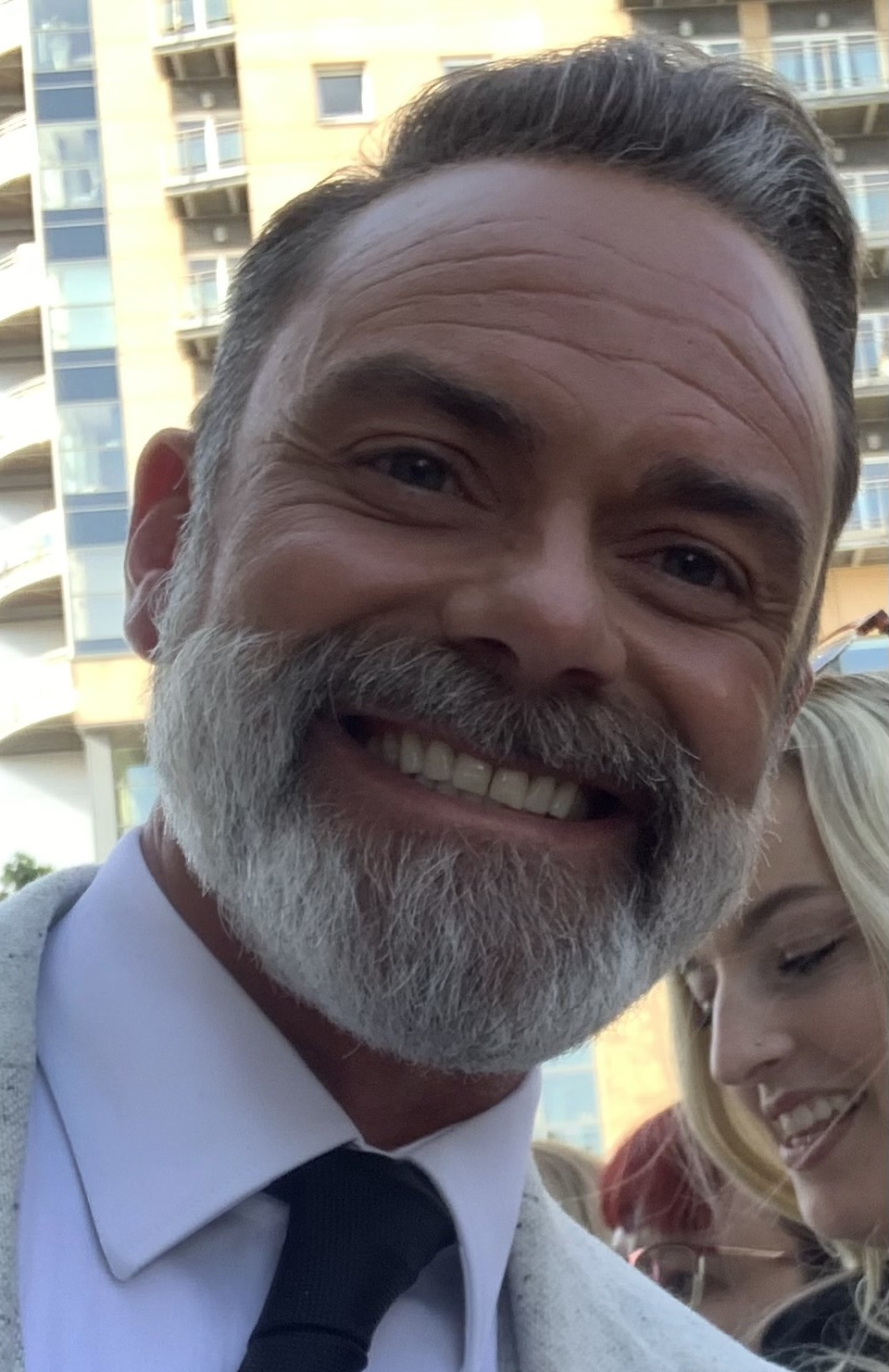
- Brocklebank in 2023
- Born: 21 December 1979 (age 46)
- Occupation: Actor
- Years active: 1994–present
- Known for: Ed Stone Is Dead; Emmerdale; Coronation Street

Daniel Brocklebank (born 21 December 1979) is an English actor, best known for portraying the roles of Ivan Jones in the ITV soap opera Emmerdale (2005–2006), and Billy Mayhew in ITV's other long-running soap Coronation Street (2014–2026). He is also known for his performance in the films Shakespeare in Love (1998), and The Hole (2001).

== Career ==
From 1994, Brocklebank has starred in various TV programmes such as Down to Earth (BBC), Born and Bred (BBC), Ed Stone is Dead (BBC 3/Channel 4), Casualty (BBC), The Bill (ITV) and played Ivan Jones in ITV's Emmerdale between the beginning of 2005 to the end of 2006. Other TV credits include The Crazy World of Captain Llama, Fair City, Doctors and Waterloo Road. Brocklebank's other films include: The Hole starring opposite Keira Knightley and Thora Birch, The Hours opposite Meryl Streep, Another Life, Merlin, The Devil's Arithmetic and The Criminal with Eddie Izzard.

Brocklebank has worked with the Royal Shakespeare Company in productions of As You Like It playing Silvius, Chiron in Titus Andronicus, Rowland in The Tamer Tamed and Ralph in Lord of the Flies. His other theatre credits include Martin Von Heilmann in The Curse of the Werewolf at the Union Theatre in London, John Rutherford in Rutherford and Son at the Royal Exchange in Manchester and John Honyman in Cressida for the Almeida Theatre in London's West End. Among other projects in 2008, Brocklebank starred in One Night in November, a new play by Alan Pollock directed by Hamish Glenn at the Belgrade Theatre, and in Big Love at the Abbey Theatre, Dublin.

In 2009, he played Brother Jasper and Kaisa in His Dark Materials, a co-production between the Birmingham Rep and the West Yorkshire Playhouse. In 2009, he completed filming Release, a British feature film, written by Christian Martin and Darren Flaxstone of FAQ's LTD, in which he plays the lead role of Father Jack Gillie. In 2010, Brocklebank starred in one of three new dark tales Little Deaths directed by Andrew Parkinson.

In December 2014, he joined the cast of Coronation Street as Billy Mayhew, the new vicar at Emily Bishop's parish, St. Mary's, and began dating the barman Sean Tully. He appears as Carl Saunders in the second (2014) and third (2015) series of the BBC's WPC 56. Brocklebank has played roles in other films such as Admiral; Soft Lad, and Native.

== Personal life ==
Brocklebank is gay. In a 2021 interview with Daily Mirror (reported by Attitude), Brocklebank said,

I pretend for a living, I didn't want to pretend in my private life. When you spend your life on screen, it's important to hold on to the bits that are real. Who I am in my real life should bear no relevance to what I play on screen [...] I remember my management in Los Angeles trying to convince me not to come out because they said it would affect work – and it did [...] I stopped being screen-tested for the heterosexual male leads, and I was either the gay best friend or the character parts.

== Filmography ==
Year	Title	Role	Notes
1994	Brum	Newspaper boy	Episode: "Brum and the Very Windy Day"
1995	Casualty	Greg Althorpe	Episode: "Shame the Devil"
1997	The Bill	Simon	Episode: "The Old Pals' Act"
1998	Merlin	Young Merlin	Miniseries; 2 episodes
1998	Monk Dawson	Young Dawson	Film
1998	Shakespeare in Love	Sam Gosse	Film
1999	The Devil's Arithmetic	Schmuel Lubitch	Television film
1999	The Criminal	Jonny	Film
1999	Oliver Twist	Board Clerk	1 episode
2000	Sam's Circus	Private Mooch	Television film
2001	The Hole	Martin Taylor	Film
2001	Another Life	Newnie Graydon	Film
2002	The Hours	Rodney	Film
2002–2003	Ed Stone Is Dead	Adam Dearfield	All 13 episodes
2002	Doctors	Tim Garrett	Episode: "Time Bomb"
2003	Born and Bred	Connor Docherty	Episode: "His Brother's Keeper"
2005	Down to Earth	Ben	2 episodes
2005	Pandora	Declan	Short film
2005–2006	Emmerdale	Ivan Jones	Regular role; 107 episodes
2008	The Bill	Ian Andain	Episode: "Spilt Blood"
2010	Release	Father Jack Gillie	Film
2010	Doctors	Matthew Thorn	Episode: "Echoes"
2010	Silent Things	PC Kearns	Short film
2010	EastEnders	Roger Green	2 episodes
2011	Casualty	Tom Watkins	Episode: "Choose Your Illusion"
2011	Little Deaths	Frank	Film
2011	Justice	Jason	Episode: "Like Father Like Son"
2011	Age of Heroes	RMP Sergeant Hamilton	Film
2011	Waterloo Road	Karl Johnson	Series 7: Episode 2
2012	Jeffrey	Jeffrey	Short film
2013	Cal	Ivan	Film
2013	Waterloo Road	Stuart Cooper	Episode: "Lies Mothers Tell"
2013	Imaginary Boys	Simon	Film
2014	Three Minutes	Casey	Short film
2014	Doctors	Dave Walker	Episode: "Blink"
2014	Holby City	Craig Donovan	Episode: "My Name Is Joe"
2014	Air	Daniel	Short film
2014	Turn Off Your Bloody Phone	Model	Short film
2014	Chasing Shadows	Dr Francis	Episode: "Off Radar: Part 1"
2014–2026	Coronation Street	Billy Mayhew	Regular role
2014–2015	WPC 56	Carl Saunders	Main role; 6 episodes
2015	Admiral	Lord Chancellor	Film
2015	Midsomer Murders	Brian Grey	Episode: "The Ballad of Midsomer County"
2015	Soft Lad	Jules	Film
2016	Native	Delin	Film
2016	Prisoner Zero	—N/a	Voice only; 17 episodes
2016	The Confessions of Dorian Gray	James Anderson	4 episodes

=== Theatre ===
- Lord of the Flies (Ralph) (1995) RSC
- Mensch Mier (Ludwig) (1996) Leicester Haymarket
- The Tamer Tamed (Rowland) (2003–2004) RSC
- Titus Andronicus (Chiron) (2003) RSC
- As you like it (Silvius) (2003) RSC
- Cressida (John Honyman) (2000) Almeida in the West End
- His Dark Materials (Brother Jasper) (2009) Birmingham Rep
- Young Frankenstein (musical) (Dr. Frederick Frankenstein) (2025) UK Tour
