= Y Touring Theatre Company =

Y Touring Theatre Company / Theatre of Debate
- Address: Kings Cross, London; England

Website
- http://www.theatreofdebate.co.uk/

Y Touring Theatre Company was a national touring theatre company which produced original plays and debates exploring contemporary issues. It was founded in 1989 by Nigel Townsend. The company was based in Kings Cross, London, England and was a former operation of Central YMCA.

In 2014 Y Touring Theatre Company was closed.

The company is now extending the work through digital media.

== Y Touring Theatre Company history ==
Y Touring produced 54 regional, national and international tours of plays by professional playwrights including Judith Johnson, Judy Upton, Jonathan Hall, Nicola Baldwin and Rhiannon Tise, reportedly reaching over 2 million young people in schools, youth clubs, community venues, studio theatres, prisons and young offenders centres.

Y Touring's first production was 'The Inner Circle' by Patricia Loughrey, originally commissioned by The New Conservatory Theatre Centre in San Francisco, adapting it for British young people's audiences. This play told the story of a group of four friends, one of whom had been infected by HIV and went on to develop AIDS and die.

== Theatre of Debate ==
Y Touring's projects generally followed a 'Theatre of Debate' model. Each project consists of a play aiming to engage its audience in an informed debate about a specific subject. The play is followed by a live debate between the actors (who remain in character) and the audience.

== Y Touring / Theatre of Debate Productions ==
2014
Y Touring Theatre Company was closed in 2014.

2011
Dayglo by Abi Bown which explored the ethical and scientific issues around Pharmacogenetics.

2011
Mind the Gap * by Abi Bown
(Revival of 2004 production)
Was performed at Royal Albert Hall as part of National Science & Engineering Week Mind the Gap was filmed and broadcast in 8 cinemas nationwide, click here for details. This production won the Runner-Up of the National Science and Engineering Week 2011 Best Science Event category

2009
'Breathing Country' by Ben Musgrave is a play which explores the issues raised by the use of electronic patient records in medical research. The production was developed in partnership with the Royal Academy of Engineering (RAEng) and was supported by the Wellcome Trust and Central YMCA.
The play was shortlisted for the Brian Way Award 2010 for best play for young people.
The project's advisory panel included the following:

- Professor Simon Wessely MD FMedSci, professor of epidemiological and liaison psychiatry at the Institute of Psychiatry, King's College London, and honorary consultant psychiatrist at King's and Maudsley Hospitals
- Dr Trevor Yellon, general practitioner, The Killick Street Community Health Centre, Kings Cross
- Marlene Winfield OBE, director for patients and public at NHS Connecting for Health
- Martyn Thomas FREng, director and principal consultant, Martyn Thomas Associates.
- Gus Hosein, visiting fellow, London School of Economics

2009
'Starfish' by Judith Johnson is a play which explores the issues raised by clinical trials.
The project was funded by the Wellcome Trust. The Daily Telegraph article about 'Starfish' commented on that the play that, 'The heartfelt response to this tear-jerking story of love, romance and grief was all the more surprising given that the play was also an attempt to explore the issues surrounding clinical trials in medicine.'

The project's Advisory Panel included the following:

- Sir Iain Chalmers, Editor, James Lind Library
- Dr David Tovey, editorial director, BMJ Knowledge
- Professor Simon Wessely, MD FMedSci, Professor of Epidemiological and Liaison Psychiatry at the Institute of Psychiatry, King's College London, and Honorary Consultant Psychiatrist at King's and Maudsley Hospitals
- Lester Firkins, Employed by the Department of Health and the Medical Research Council as a lay representative for various areas of concern
- David Kaskel, CEO and managing director, Languagelab.com
- Professor Max Parmar, Joint Director of the UK Clinical Research Network, Medical Research Council Clinical Trials Unit, associate director of the National Cancer Research Network
- Professor Janet Darbyshire, Joint Director of the UK Clinical Research Network
- Dr Sophie Petit-Zeman, Head of External Relations, Association of Medical Research Charities

2008
'The Projectionist' by Laura FitzGerald is an audio play/podcast exploring social, moral, scientific and political questions posed by the rise of a privacy and surveillance society. The production was developed in partnership with the Royal Academy of Engineering. The project's advisory panel included the following:

- Nigel Gilbert, professor, Department of Sociology, University of Surrey, Guildford
- Martyn Thomas FREng, director and principal consultant, Martyn Thomas Associates
- Colin Langham-Fitt, formerly deputy chief constable, Suffolk Constabulary
- Charlie Edwards, senior researcher Demos (UK think tank)
- Dr Ian Forbes, social science consultant & Director
- Gus Hosein, visiting fellow in the Information Systems Group at the London School of Economics and Political Science

2007
'Nobody Lives Forever' by Judith Johnson, exploring the social, moral, scientific and political questions raised by stem cell research. The production was developed in partnership with the Association of Medical Research Charities (AMRC) and was supported by the Medical Research Council (UK) (MRC), the Department of Health, Action Medical Research and the Royal Albert Hall. The project's Advisory Panel included the following:

- Dr Sophie Petit-Zeman, Head of External Relations, Association of Medical Research Charities
- Dr Calum MacKellar, Director of Research, Scottish Council on Human Bioethics
- Dr Robin Lovell-Badge, Head of Developmental Genetics, MRC National Institute for Medical Research
- Josephine Quintavalle, CORE - Comment on Reproductive Ethics
- Dr Donald Bruce, formerly Director of Society, Religion and Technology Project, Church of Scotland
- Dr Stephen Minger, Lecturer in Biomolecular Sciences at King's College London

2007
'Full Time' by Rachel Wagstaff is a play that explores racism, homophobia and sexism in football. The production was developed in partnership with the Football Association and the Women's Sports Foundation (WSF). The project was supported by the Football Foundation and Central YMCA. The project's Advisory Panel included the following:

- Cassie Smith, National Development Manager, Women's Sport and fitness Foundation
- Chris Lillistone, Research and Information Coordinator, Women's Sport and fitness Foundation
- Lucy Faulkner, Equality Manager, The Football Association
- Leon Mann, Europe and Media Relations Officer, Kick It Out
- Johan Jensen, Education Officer, Stonewall
- Adam Banda, Homeless World Cup
- Tony Peacock, Homeless World Cup
- Lorraine Deschamps, Director, Sporting Equals
- Meg Ryan, Teacher, Redden Court School

2006
'Every Breath' by Judith Johnson, exploring the social, moral, scientific and political questions raised by the use of animals in medical research. This production was developed in partnership with the Association of Medical Research charities. The project's Advisory Panel included the following:

- Dr. Jarrod Bailey, Science Director, Europeans for Medical Progress
- Alistair Currie, formerly Campaigns Director, British Union for the Abolition of Vivisection
- Vicky Cowell, Director, Seriously Ill for Medical Research
- Dr. Penny Hawkins Deputy Head, Research Animals Department, RSPCA
- Betty McBride, Marketing and Communications Director, British Heart Foundation
- Professor John Martin, Director Centre for Cardiovascular Biology and Medicine, UCL
- Dr. Sophie Petit-Zeman, Director of Public Dialogue, Association of Medical Research Charities
- Dr. Janet Radcliffe Richards, Lecturer in the Philosophy of Medicine, UCL
- Harald Schmidt, assistant director, Nuffield Council on Bioethics

* 2004
'Mind the Gap' by Abi Bown, exploring the social, moral, scientific and political questions raised by advances in neuroscience. This production was developed in partnership with The European DANA Alliance for the Brain. The project's Advisory Panel included the following:

- James Butcher, Editor, Lancet Neurology
- Prof Russell Foster, Head of the Department of Integrative and Molecular Neuroscience, Imperial College
- Prof Sir Michael Rutter, formerly Professor of Child and Adolescent Psychiatry, Institute of Psychiatry, University of London
- Prof Steven Rose, Director of Brain and Behaviour Research Group, Open University
- Prof Richard Ashcroft, Medical Ethics Unit, Imperial College

2000
'Learning to Love the Grey' by Jonathan Hall, exploring the social, moral, scientific and political questions raised by advances in Cloning and stem cell therapy. Developed in partnership with, and supported by, the Wellcome Trust.

1999
'Sweet As You Are' by Jonathan Hall, exploring the social, moral, scientific and political questions raised by the Genetic Modification of crops. Developed in partnership with, and supported by, the John Innes Centre and the Teachers Scientist network. The play won a fringe first award at the Edinburgh festival 1999

1997
'Pig in the Middle' by Judy Upton, exploring the social, moral, scientific and political questions raised by advances in Xenotransplantation (animal to human transplants). Developed in partnership with the Nuffield Council on Bioethics. The project's Advisory Panel included the following:

- Dr John Dunning, Consultant Cardiothoracic Surgeon
- Paula Keenan & Vanessa Morgan, Transplant Coordinators
- Prof Mark Wolpert, then Prof of Medicine, Member of Nuffield Council's Working Party on ethics of animal to human transplants
- Susan Frade, Transplant Recipient
- Andrew Tyler, Director Animal Aid

1996
'Cracked' by Nicola Baldwin, exploring the biological basis of mental illness and depression in particular. Developed in partnership with The Mental Health Foundation, supported by the Wellcome Trust. The project's Advisory Panel included the following:

- Dr Sophie Petit Zeman
- Professor Roy Porter
- Dr Michael O’Donovan, Senior Lecturer and Honorary Consultant Psychiatrist, University of Wales College of Medicine
- Professor Chris Fairburn, University of Oxford
- Professor Lewis Wolpert

1995
'The Gift' by Nicola Baldwin, exploring the social, moral, scientific and political questions raised by advances in Genetic selection. Developed with Prof Bernadette Modell supported by the Wellcome Trust.

== Digital Media ==
Y Touring produced, in partnership with Maverick Productions, a three-part adaptation of 'Learning to Love the Grey' and a three-part drama 'Making Astronauts', a drama which complements the Nuffield Council on Bioethics’ report on the ethics of research into the relationship between genes and behaviour. Both of these dramas were commissioned by the Open University’s Open Science programme.

== Patrons ==
- Melvyn Bragg and Dame Joan Bakewell

== Actors the company have worked with ==
- Adam Deacon
- Craig Roberts
- Elyes Gabel
