= Kerry Stacey =

British actress (born 1977)

- Born: 1977 (age 47–48); St Austell, England
- Occupation: Actor

Kerry Stacey (born 1977) is an English actress who is best known for playing Toni Daggert in ITV's Emmerdale.

Stacey has had a role on BBC1's Doctors, she commented "I play a character whose sister has committed suicide and she is reeling from that. She's very mixed up about the suicide. She's quite a dark character,".

== Credits: Television, Film, Stage and Radio ==
Television
2009, Television, Ebony, Ebony's Yard (Rehearsed Reading), BBC Comedy
2009, Television, Leanne Gates, Doctors, BBC, Mark Chadbourn
2005, Television, Toni Daggert, Emmerdale (Regular 2005–07), Yorkshire Television, Various
Television, Angie, Afternoon Play, BBC Television, John Greening
Television, Beth, Doctors, BBC Television, Christianan Ebohon
Television, Robin, A Thing Called Love, BBC Television, Metin Huseyin
Television, Beth, Casualty, BBC Television, Terry Iland
Television, Joyce, Make My Day, Monkey Kingdom, John Dower
Television, Jane, Casualty, BBC Television
Television, Isla, The Bill, Thames Television, Michael Ferguson
Television, Nurse Atckinson, Doctors, BBC Television, Matt Greening
Television, Mandy, The Locksmith, BBC Television, Alan Dossor
Television, Sammi, Coping With Christmas, Channel 4, Dan Zeff
Television, Sammi, Coping With Grown-Ups, Channel 4, Brian Lighthill
Television, Sharon, Cardiac Arrest, BBC Television, Sam Miller
Television, Sharon, The Lodge, Central Television, Lorne Magary
Television, Kelly, Choices, Central Television, Dirk Campbell
Television, Maureen, Phoenix Hall, Central Television, Geoff Husson

Film
Feature Film, Jackie, The Unloved, Revolution Films, Samantha Morton
Feature Film, Gywneth, Therapy, Uber Productions, Paul Thompson
Feature Film, Justine, Amatuar Dramatics, Intermedia Film with Halla Pro., Anya Leneun
Feature Film, Odeth, Lively up yourself, Egoli Tossell Film AG, Ed Herzog
Feature Film, Jackie, Felicia's Journey, Marquis Films, Atom Egoyan
2009, Feature Film, Kizzy (Lead Character), No Lady, EM Media, Piers Hill
2010, Feature Film, Lindy, Flutter, Flutter Films, Giles BorgStage

Stage
Stage, Leah, Beautiful Thing, Pilot Theatre and Bolton Octagon, Marcus Romer
Stage, Tina, Peckham Monologues, Talawa Theatre, Tara Mack
Stage, Tanisha, Past and Present, Mance Productions, Liz Mance
Stage, Ruby, Connected, Y Touring Theatre Company, Sarah Frankcom
Stage, Maria, God's Door, Nottingham Playhouse Theatre, Emily Grey
Stage, Cally, Learning To Love The Grey, Y Touring Theatre Company, Nigel Townsend
Stage, Opal, Double Trouble, Y Touring Theatre Company, Nigel Townsend
Stage, Danielle, Dear DD, Y Touring Theatre Company, Nigel Townsend

Radio
Radio, Charity, Top Story, BBC Radio, Brian Lighthill
Radio, Esta Senior, Lost, BBC Radio, Brian Lighthill
