= Cleveland Campbell =

English actor

Cleveland Campbell (born 3 October 1977 in Rochdale, UK) is a British actor. His family is originally from Kingston, Jamaica. He is best known for his role in ITV's Emmerdale as Danny Daggert. He played the part from 2001 until 2007, starring in 495 episodes. He has also appeared in The Bill and Sunshine with Steve Coogan. In 2007, he appeared in pantomime at the Tameside Hippodrome.

Before entering show business, he had previously completed a performing arts course at Hopwood Hall College. On its completion Cleveland also began a course in Hairdressing, also at Hopwood Hall College, Rochdale. He completed the level 2 qualification but did not move on as he got his part in Emmerdale.

== Controversy ==
Cleveland was arrested and charged with grievous bodily harm after an alleged altercation at the 21st birthday party of ex-Hollyoaks actress Gemma Atkinson in Rochdale. He appeared in court on 25 September 2006, entering a not guilty plea. His trial was subsequently halted, however, when new evidence emerged which cast doubt on the reliability of a witness for the prosecution and the case against him was eventually dismissed on 18 January 2007.
