= Lance Hammer =

American independent filmmaker

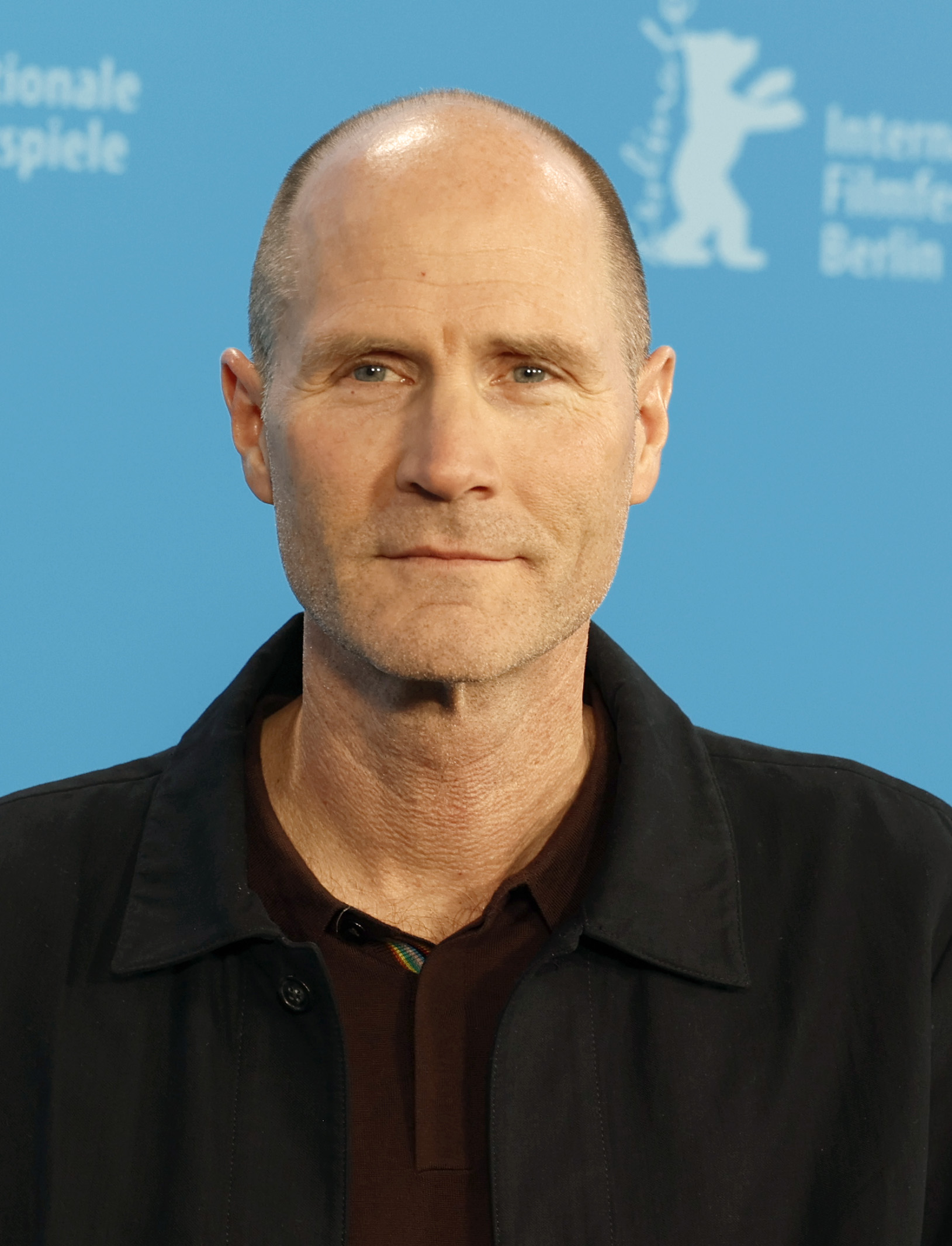
Hammer in 2026

Lance Hammer is an American independent filmmaker. Most known for his debut feature film Ballast (2008).

== Career ==
Hammer originally trained as an architect, and still practises. He has served as art director on multiple Hollywood films before moving into directing. His first film, Ballast, premiered in competition at the Sundance Film Festival where he won the US Dramatic Directing Award. Ballast was nominated for six Independent Spirit Awards and four Gotham Independent Film Awards. Hammer won the Gotham Independent Film Award for Breakthrough Director.

After an 18-year hiatus, Hammer returned with Queen at Sea (2026), which deals with dementia, and stars Juliette Binoche and Tom Courtenay. The film premiered at the main competition of the 76th Berlin International Film Festival in February 2026; it was nominated for the Golden Bear, winning the Silver Bear Jury Prize and the Silver Bear for Best Supporting Performance for both Courtenay and Anna Calder-Marshall.

== Filmography ==
Year	Title	Director	Writer	Producer	Editor
2002	Issaquena	Yes	Yes	Yes	No
2008	Ballast	Yes	Yes	Yes	Yes
2026	Queen at Sea	Yes	Yes	No	No

Other credits

Year	Title	Role
1995	Batman Forever	Computer graphics city designer
1997	Batman & Robin	Digital design associate
1998	Practical Magic	Visual effects art director
2001	The Man Who Wasn't There	Assistant art director

== Accolades ==
Ceremony	Award	Film	Result	Ref.
76th Berlin International Film Festival	Silver Bear Jury Prize	Queen at Sea	Won	
