= Heywood Community High School =

Location
- Sutherland Road; Darnhill, Heywood, Greater Manchester, OL10 3PL; United Kingdom; 53°35′16″N 2°15′08″W

Information
- Type: High School; Community School
- Established: 1966 (as Sutherland High School)
- Closed: 31 August 2010
- Local authority: Rochdale
- Department for Education URN: 105835 Tables
- Chair: Mrs V Purslow
- Headteacher: Mr David Yates
- Gender: Mixed-sex
- Age: 11 to 16
- Enrolment: 216 (at the time of closure)
- Former name: Sutherland High School
- Website: www.hchs.co.uk

Heywood Community High School was a secondary school in the Heywood district of the Metropolitan Borough of Rochdale in Greater Manchester, United Kingdom. The school closed 30 June 2010 to students but officially closed on 31 August 2010.

== History ==
The school opened in 1966 as Sutherland High School. The school was renamed to Heywood Community High School 31 August 1990.

In 2006 when the position of Headteacher was appointed to David Yates the school's performance improved dramatically, from 10% A*-C GCSE grade to 71% in 2010, the year of the school's closure. This made the school one of the best in the Rochdale borough and in the top 20 most improved schools in the country.

The school officially closed on 31 August 2010, as a result of the British Government's Building Schools for the Future strategy. The school stopped accepting new students in 2008 in order to phase out the majority of students in preparation for the closure in 2010. When the school closed the majority of remaining students were transferred to neighbouring Siddal Moor Sports College and the remainder to Holy Family College. In the school's last Ofsted report it was found to be outstanding in many areas. The former school building was demolished in late 2010.

== In the media ==
- 27 September 2003 the school had a large fire in the technology department. The school was open as usual after the fire.
- 10 August 2010 Arsonists deliberately set fire to the former school building. Two days later another fire was started in the building. Heywood councillor Jacqui Beswick reported the site has been left unsecured.
- 26 August 2010 the school announced record GCSE exam results for the last year of the school. 71% of students achieved A*-C grades. This was above the national average of 69.1% that year.

== Notable alumni ==
- Elliott Tittensor, an actor best known for his role of Carl Gallagher in the Channel 4 show Shameless, is a former student of Heywood Community High School. He left the school in 2006.
- Luke Tittensor is an actor best known for playing Daz Eden in the ITV soap Emmerdale. He is the twin brother of Elliott Tittensor.

=== Sutherland High School ===
- Mike Hill, Labour MP since 2017 for Hartlepool

== Gallery ==
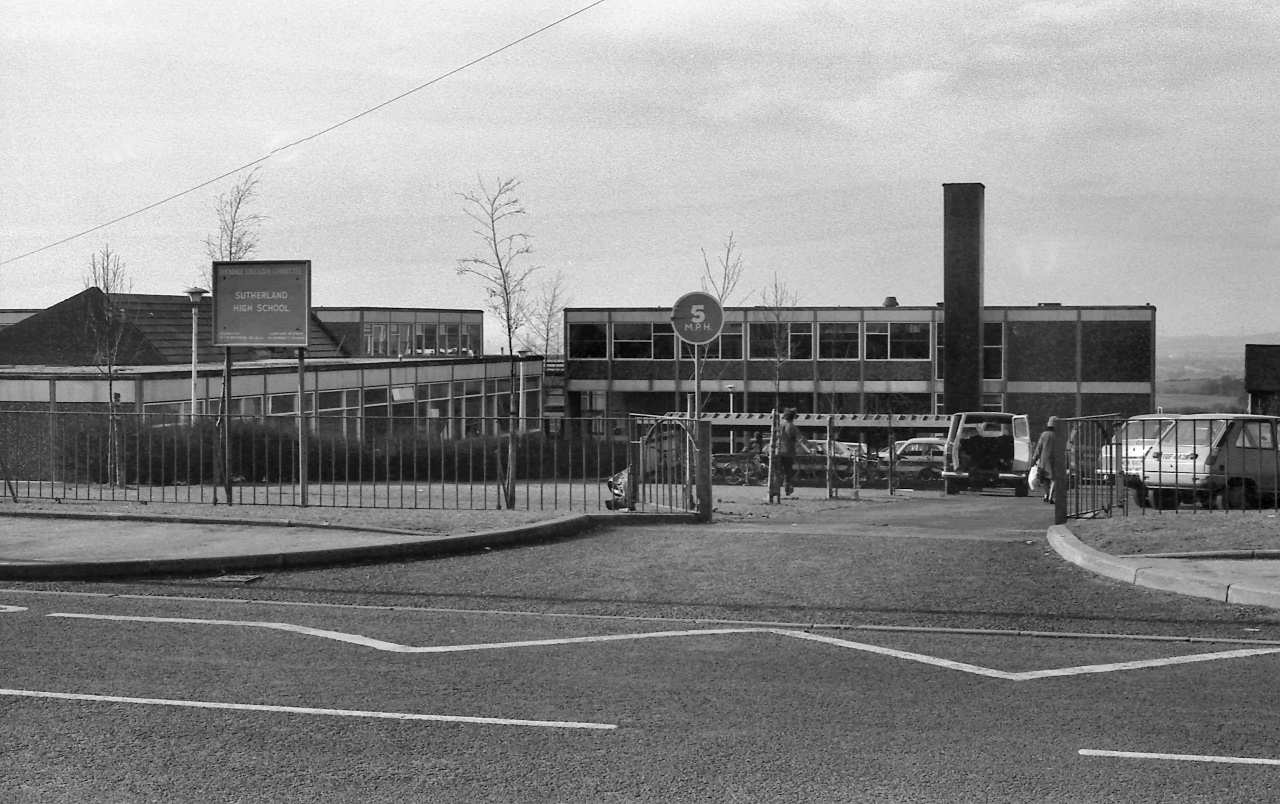
Outside Sutherland High School in 1977

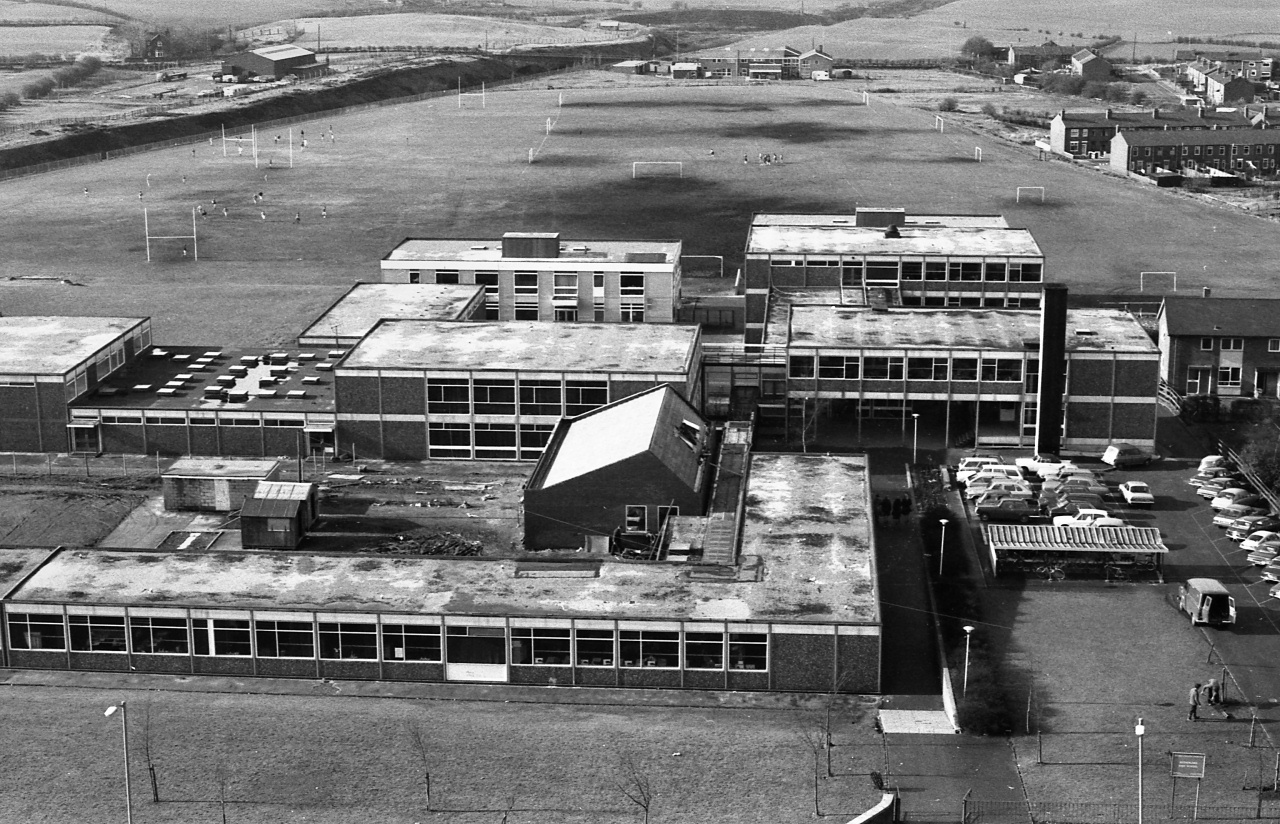
Aerial view of Sutherland High School in 1977

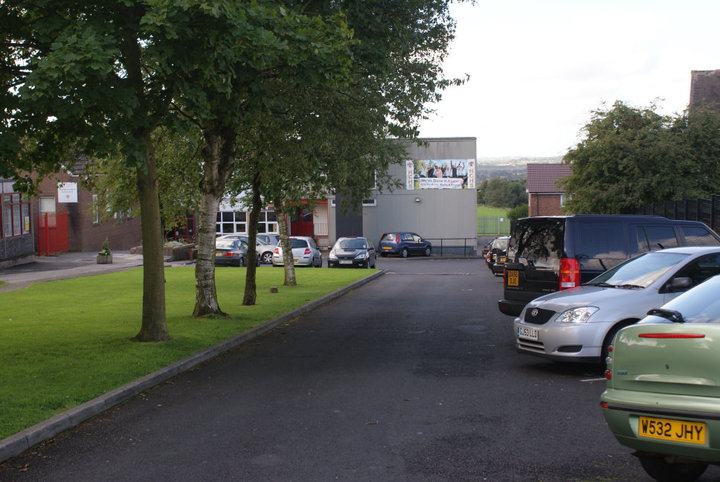
The drive of Heywood Community High School

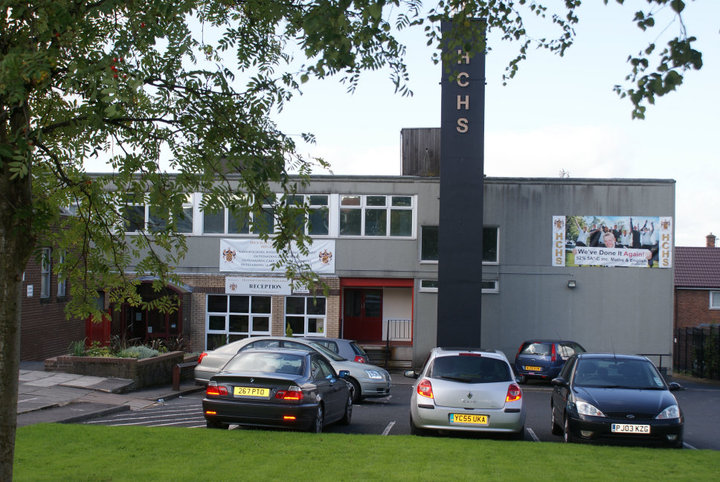
The reception area, displaying HCHS on the tower

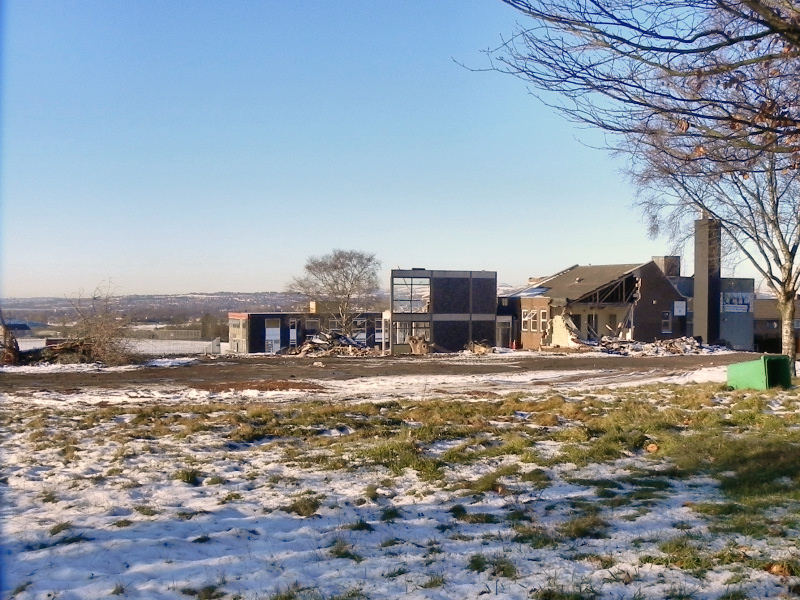
The school whilst being demolished
