= Straight Circle =

2025 drama film

- Directed by: Oscar Hudson
- Written by: Oscar Hudson
- Produced by: Thomas Benski; Greig Buckle; Rik Green; Riaz Rizvi; Kevin Rowe
- Starring: Luke Tittensor; Elliot Tittensor; Neil Maskell
- Cinematography: Christopher Ripley
- Edited by: Fouad Gaber
- Music by: Maxwell Sterling
- Production companies: 2AM; Such Content; MAGNA Studios; BBC Film; Helekan Pictures; Prospect Avenue
- Distributed by: Joint Venture (United States)
- Release date: September 1, 2025 (Venice)
- Running time: 108 minutes
- Countries: United States; United Kingdom; South Africa
- Language: English

Straight Circle is a 2025 absurdist satirical comedy film written and directed by Oscar Hudson in his directorial debut. Produced by BBC Film, Magna Studios, 2AM, and Such Content, it stars Luke Tittensor, Elliott Tittensor, and Neil Maskell.

The film had its world premiere in the Critics' Week section of the 82nd Venice International Film Festival on September 1, 2025, where it won the IWONDERFULL Grand Prize. In January 2026, independent film studio Joint Venture acquired the U.S. distribution rights.

== Cast ==
- Luke Tittensor
- Elliott Tittensor
- Neil Maskell
- Fiona Ramsay
- Matthew Dylan Roberts
- Camilla Waldman

== Production ==
In February 2025, it was announced that Oscar Hudson had directed the film from a screenplay he wrote, with principal photography concluding in South Africa.

== Release ==
It had its world premiere at the 82nd Venice International Film Festival in the Critics Week section on September 1, 2025. In January 2026, Joint Venture acquired U.S. distribution rights to the film. An official trailer for the film was released on September 8, 2026.

== Accolades ==
Year	Event / Festival	Category / Award	Recipient(s)	Result	Ref.
2025	Venice International Film Critics' Week	IWONDERFULL Grand Prize	Straight Circle	Won	
2025	Venice International Film Critics' Week	Verona Film Club Prize for Most Innovative Film	Straight Circle	Won	
2025	Marrakech International Film Festival	Best Directing Prize	Oscar Hudson	Won	
2025	Marrakech International Film Festival	Special Mention	Elliot Tittensor and Luke Tittensor	Won	
