= Billy Hopwood =

Fictional character from Emmerdale

- Emmerdale character
- Portrayed by: David Crellin
- Duration: 1997–1998, 2003, 2006–2007
- First appearance: 3 July 1997
- Last appearance: 19 October 2007
- Introduced by: Mervyn Watson (1997); Steve Frost (2003); Kathleen Beedles (2006)
In-universe information
- Occupation: Mechanic
- Mother: Granny Hopwood
- Wife: Trisha Hopwood (backstory)
- Sons: Andy Sugden; Daz Eden
- Grandsons: Jack Sugden
- Granddaughters: Sarah Sugden

Billy Hopwood is a fictional character from the British soap opera Emmerdale, played by David Crellin. The character made his first appearance during the episode broadcast on 3 July 1997. He was introduced as one of several new characters producers created for the show in 1997. He is the father of Andy Sugden (Kelvin Fletcher), and his main storyline results in him killing Vic Windsor (Alun Lewis). Crellin made a guest appearance as Billy during a 2003 storyline. Billy was reintroduced into the series in 2006 and writers created a redemption story arc for Billy. He then has an affair with Diane Sugden (Elizabeth Estensen). Crellin made his final appearance as Billy during the episode broadcast on 19 October 2007.

== Casting ==
Crellin first appeared in Emmerdale in 1997, when Billy was one of a host of new characters producers introduced into the series that year. He departed after one year and returned briefly in 2003. In November 2006, it was announced that Crellin had agreed to reprise the role of Billy. Crellin told Digital Spy that the serial's producers contacted him six months prior asking him to return. Crellin had always found the role "enjoyable" so thought it was a great idea to return. Although he accepted straight away, his only reservation was that Billy would behave in the same way he previously did. Crellin also said that he would stay in Emmerdale until they became bored of the character or he was no longer useful in storylines.

== Development ==
Crellin told Digital Spy that Billy originally wanted to make money and live a "champagne lifestyle like everybody else has." He said that Billy perceives everyone else as having cars, houses and normal jobs. He thinks that they have not worked hard for these acquisitions. Billy "wants what they've got and does whatever he can to get it." Crellin said that Billy turns to robbery because he is not "very intelligent". In the character's back story, he took drugs, took part in business raids, sought involvement in an "inner-city gang", and carried firearms. Crellin said that if Billy had a different background then "he would have been a very different man". Billy is a "product of his environment" and just wants to live a life where he has his own house and possessions. Billy's desire for more and his lack of achievement force him to make "some ridiculous and monumental mistakes."

In December 1998, Billy commits a robbery at the local post office and which results in a struggle with postmaster Vic Windsor (Alun Lewis). Vic is killed during the struggle. Crellin said that Billy did not go out of his way to murder Vic. He "turned up unexpectedly and in the struggle he banged his head, he didn't actually deliberately murder him."

When Billy is released from prison, Crellin said that Billy just wants contact with his sons Andy Sugden (Kelvin Fletcher) and Daz Eden (Luke Tittensor). Crellin explained that Billy "gets a very mixed response due to his past behaviour, Andy struggles, he's bound to struggle, and I think he's going to struggle for a long, long time." Billy wants to "lay down some kind of roots" in the village because he has spent his life being a drifter or incarcerated. Billy is not a good father because he is from a dysfunctional family himself. It is "difficult" for Billy to be a parent because he was never given an example as a child.

However, the "first hurdle" he has to overcome is Vic's widow, Viv Hope (Deena Payne). Vic's daughter Kelly Windsor (Adele Silva) does not want Billy living in the village either. Crellin opined that the situation between Billy and Kelly is "a very difficult one." Billy did not mean to kill Vic and "he has no issue with Kelly", but the situation makes Billy realise why Kelly does not want him there. He attributed Billy's actions as the reason why Kelly herself is "quite a damaged person". Tittensor told a reporter from What's on TV that Daz is wary of his father's return although they there is a "strong bond between them". While Daz is "pleased and wants to see him", he attempts to keep away from Billy because Andy and Jack Sugden (Clive Hornby) do not approve. While Daz what Jack appreciates has done for him, Billy is his actual father and meets with him. Tittensor added that Jack is "scared" that he might lose Daz to Billy, but he cannot stop him. Daz wants Billy around and "the more people go against Billy, the more likely Daz is to side with his dad" because he does not believe that Billy is as bad as everyone says he is. Billy seems "very genuine" and does not have a hidden agenda.

Billy has an affair with Jack's wife Diane (Elizabeth Estensen), which is later exposed. The revelation affects his relationship with Daz. Billy is featured in the serial's 35th anniversary storyline. After Victoria exposed his affairs and causes him to lose "love of his life", he gets revenge by telling her that Jack killed her mother Sarah Sugden (Alyson Spiro). Victoria then starts a fire at her family home.

== Storylines ==
Having been released from prison, Billy arrives in the village to see his son Andy, who is fostered by the Sugden family. Andy chooses to live with his real father. Billy is a criminal and spends most of his time trying to deceive his fellow residents. This culminates with him attempting an armed robbery on the village Post Office on Christmas Day 1998. Postmaster Vic Windsor is fatally injured in the robbery. Billy is arrested and later sent to prison for manslaughter. Andy is then adopted by the Sugden family. In 2003, Andy is surprised to find a boy in his house named Daz, claiming to be his half-brother. Daz tells Andy they share a father, and Andy initially refuses to have anything to do with Daz. Andy later decides to visit Billy in prison, where he confirms that Daz is really his half-brother and that he was the one who sent Daz in search of Andy.

Billy isn't mentioned again until late 2006, when Vic's widow Viv and her husband Bob Hope (Tony Audenshaw) receive a letter informing them that Billy is up for parole. Vic's daughter Kelly happens to intercept the letter and is disgusted to discover that her father's killer is going to be released. The Sugden family are also shocked to learn Billy was paroled and is devastated to learn that Billy is opposing Jack and Diane's application to adopt Daz. Billy claims that he does not want to lose another son. Jack is sceptical about this, believing it is just a plot to get bail. When questions Daz about his father, it is clear that he is not against him. Billy is released from prison and returns to Emmerdale, and immediately goes to find his sons. Andy makes it very clear he wants nothing to do with Billy, though Daz seems unsure and later visits Billy alone, in an attempt to get to know him better.

Billy decides to take a night shift job as a rubbish collector. Kelly pays Eli Dingle (Joseph Gilgun) to tamper with the brakes on Billy's vehicle to cause an accident. He later sees Victoria being harassed by an older male and rescues her. Billy offers Victoria a lift home, unaware that the truck he is driving is faulty. While driving back, the brakes fail to work causing Billy to crash into a lake. He escapes from the vehicle but realises that Victoria is trapped. He dives under water to several times to provide her with oxygen until paramedics rescue her. Jack reluctantly thanks Billy for risking his own life to save Victoria. He informs him that it still does not change the situation.

Billy and Diane realise they have feelings for each other and decide they should not act on their feelings. Diane sets Billy up on a date with her sister Val Lambert (Charlie Hardwick) and the pair share a kiss. Diane then becomes jealous of their relationship. Billy argues with Diane over her interfering in his relationship. Diane becomes angry and pushes Billy into a wall. They try to sort out their differences; Billy then declares his love for Diane and they kiss. Billy then tries to force Diane to choose between him and Jack. Diane cannot cope with the confusion and goes away for a while. Billy steals Debbie's car to try and catch Diane before she leaves, but the police arrest him before he gets to her. Val visits Billy in custody and realises that he has been seeing Diane. Victoria discovers the truth about their affair and informs Jack. Victoria then insults Billy to the point that he reveals the truth about her mother's death. Diane tells Billy that she does not love him and simply enjoyed the element of danger that their relationship created. Victoria sets a fire in her house to get revenge on her family. Billy rescues Andy and Jack, but an explosion traps Billy. Everyone presumes that Billy is dead until he is pulled from the fire. Billy recovers in hospital with Daz keeping a vigil by his bedside. Whilst Daz is asleep, Billy discharges himself and leaves the hospital.

== Reception ==
Graham Keal of the Daily Record opined that Billy and Diane's affair was "disastrous" and branded Billy as a "bad boy". Jane Simon of the Daily Mirror said that "no one would shed a tear for Billy" if he had died in the lorry accident. The accident involving Billy and Victoria was nominated for "Spectacular Scene of the Year" at the 2007 British Soap Awards. Simon said that Billy is the "worst father in the world". While he is not good at parenting, Simon quipped that he was becoming the "world's most hard-working bin-man – along with racing to fulfil every one of Jimmy's outrageous demands, he now seems to be providing a seven-day, round-theclock collection service for the villagers of Emmerdale." Tina Baker from Soaplife branded Billy a "nasty" character and the plot featuring him and Andy whilst he escaped from prison as "brilliant" and "tense scenes". Due to Billy's characterisation and Crellin's previous acting roles, Baker noted that he "seems to have cornered the market in horrid men."
