= Queen at Sea =

2026 drama film by Lance Hammer

- British promotional poster
- Directed by: Lance Hammer
- Written by: Lance Hammer
- Produced by: Tristan Goligher
- Starring: Juliette Binoche; Tom Courtenay; Anna Calder-Marshall; Florence Hunt
- Cinematography: Adolpho Veloso
- Edited by: Lance Hammer
- Production companies: The Bureau; Alluvial Film Company
- Distributed by: Curzon Film (United Kingdom); Greenwich Entertainment (United States)
- Release dates: 17 February 2026 (Berlinale); 18 September 2026 (United Kingdom); 30 October 2026 (United States)
- Running time: 121 minutes
- Countries: United Kingdom; United States
- Language: English
- Box office: $268,253

Queen at Sea is a 2026 drama film written and directed by Lance Hammer. A co-production of the United Kingdom and the United States, it stars Juliette Binoche, Tom Courtenay, and Anna Calder-Marshall, and follows Amanda, a middle-aged woman struggling with her mother's dementia.

The film had its world premiere at the main competition of the 76th Berlin International Film Festival on 17 February 2026, where it won the Silver Bear Jury Prize and the Silver Bear for Best Supporting Performance for Courtenay and Calder-Marshall. It received critical acclaim, with particular praises for its direction and performances. It was theatrically released in the United Kingdom by Curzon Film on 18 September, followed by its release in the United States by Greenwich Entertainment on 30 October 2026. It received widespread praise from critics.

== Plot ==
Amanda walks in on her step-father Martin having sex with her mother Leslie, which shocks her. Leslie has advanced dementia, and Martin has previously been told by Leslie's doctor that, due to her mental incapacity, she can no longer consent to sex. Amanda, intending to teach her step-father a lesson, calls the police on him. The police end up arresting Martin for sexual assault.

Amanda, who lives in Newcastle and is a tenured professor at a university there, moves in to her parents' house to look after her mother while Martin is investigated. Meanwhile, her teenage daughter Sara, strikes up a relationship with a local boy, James.

Martin insists on staying in his own house, despite his bail conditions. When she realises her mother is restless when Martin is not in bed with her, Amanda reluctantly lets Martin stay in Leslie's room - under the condition he not engage in sex with her. Martin protests, noting it is often Leslie who initiates sexual contact, but relents after an argument with Amanda.

A court-appointed assessor visits to investigate Leslie's living conditions, and is taken aback when she sees Martin present in the house. Amanda saves him by saying she invited him for the visit.

Ultimately, Leslie is moved into a care home, devastating Martin, but the care home staff send Amanda updates showing Leslie having a nice time. A few days later, Amanda is called by the care home saying she went into another resident's room for some time, and was found leaving the room half naked. When Martin and Amanda come to the home to see Leslie, she is found holding the hands of the man whose room she went into. A distraught Martin agrees that Leslie does not understand consent and won't have sex with her any further. They take Leslie back to Martin's place. Meanwhile, Sara's relationship with James is getting serious, and Amanda buys her condoms.

Amanda and Martin hire a home nurse to care for Leslie, giving Martin a break. Martin and Amanda repair their relationship, but Martin is clearly tired and sad at how far Leslie has deteriorated.

Amanda and Martin agree to have dinner one evening, and he opts to take a walk prior while the home nurse looks after Leslie. Martin returns to find the home nurse attempting to wash Leslie, who has soiled herself. Leslie is shouting and is scared of the nurse. Martin tells the nurse she can go home and he would help Leslie for the rest of the afternoon. Martin manages to calm Leslie down enough to get in the shower-bath, but when he attempts to wash her backside she startles, and hits him away, causing him to slip over the edge of the bath and onto the tile. Leslie realises something is wrong when Martin is motionless on the ground, blood pooling from his head.

Amanda returns to Martin's apartment for dinner and finds her mother naked at the top of the stairs, with the shower still running. The camera cuts away before Amanda finds Martin. Meanwhile, Sara leaves James' house after having sex for the first time.

== Cast ==
- Juliette Binoche as Amanda Powell
- Tom Courtenay as Martin Carville
- Anna Calder-Marshall as Leslie Carville
- Florence Hunt as Sara
- Cody Molko as James
- Steven Cree as Jonathan Reid
- Michelle Jeram as DC Emma Walker
- Marie-Elle Vooijs as Anneke
- Jean Pemberton as Gemma
- Liani Samuel as Frida
- Lolabelle Backus as Julien
- Noah Hunt Basden as Victor
- Yasmin Campbell as Tessa
- Joe Horsford as Luke
- Alison Pargeter as Janise
- Elizabeth Rushbrook as PC Kate Brooks
- Mohammad Amiri as PC Ali
- Michelle Kelly as Julie

== Production ==
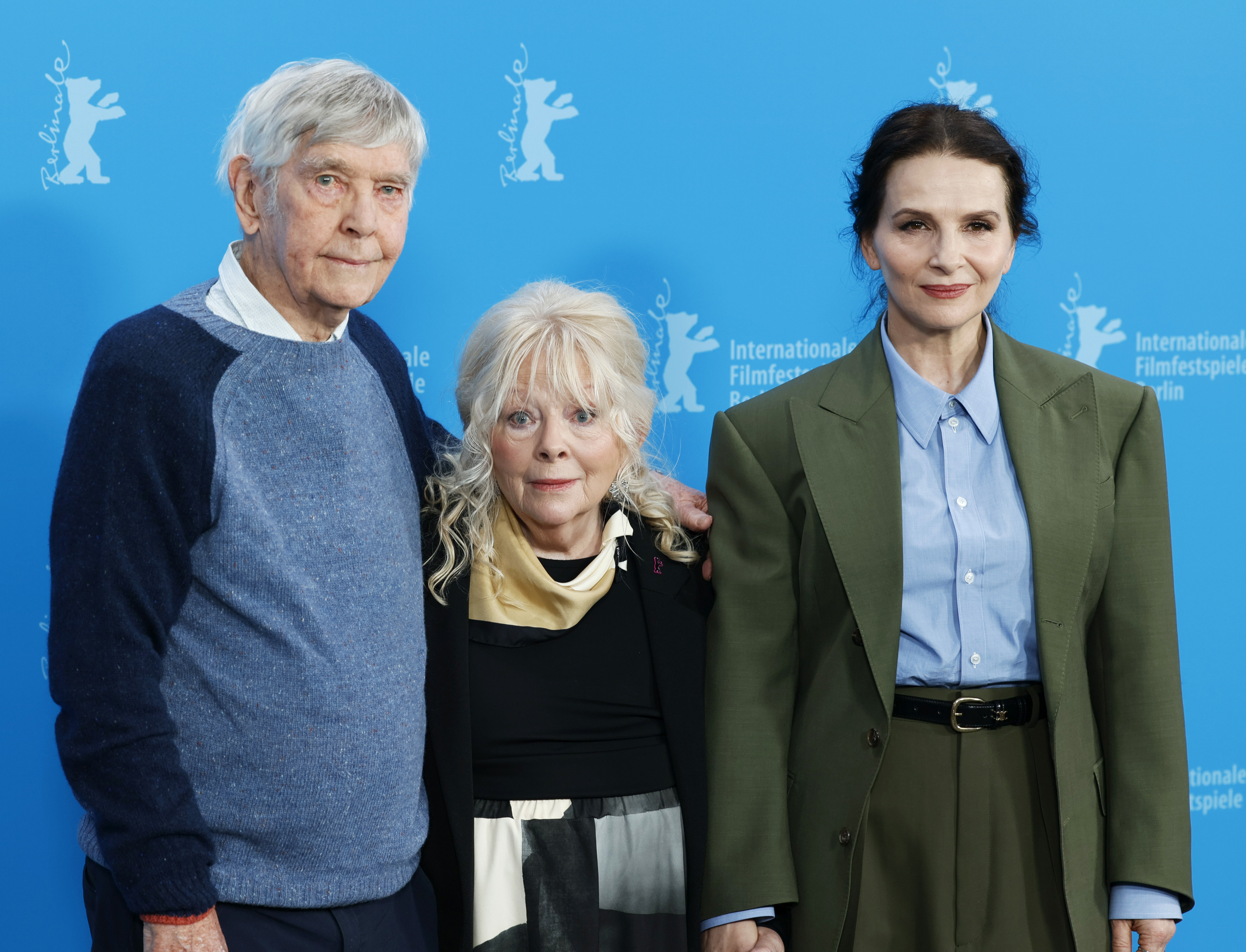
Tom Courtenay, Anna Calder-Marshall and Juliette Binoche at the 76th Berlin International Film Festival

After releasing Ballast (2008), which had also been nominated for the Golden Bear at the 2008 Berlinale, Lance Hammer entered an 18-year-long hiatus, working mainly as an academic professor.

Principal photography for Queen at Sea began on 18 April 2023 in London. Adolpho Veloso served as director of photography, shooting the film on 35mm.

== Release ==
Queen at Sea premiered at the 76th Berlin International Film Festival on 17 February 2026. The Match Factory is handling sales for the film. The film was released in the United Kingdom on 18 September, and in the United States on 30 October.

== Reception ==
=== Critical response ===
On the review aggregator website Rotten Tomatoes, 92% of 51 critics' reviews are positive, with an average rating of 8.6/10. The website's consensus reads: "Shattering yet deeply compassionate, Queen at Sea confronts the emotional ravages of mental decline with unflinching honesty and outstanding performances." Metacritic, which uses a weighted average, assigns the film a score of 86 out of 100, based on 11 critics, indicating "universal acclaim".

After its premiere, Queen at Sea earned widespread critical acclaim, including from Screen Daily, the British Film Institute, Variety, Vulture, and IndieWire.

In his five-star review for The Guardian, Peter Bradshaw called Queen at Sea "an almighty comeback" by director Lance Hammer, "unbearable in its tragic candour and essential in its moral questioning." Kevin Maher of The Times also gave a five-star review, calling it "bracingly honest" and "extraordinary." The Financial Times gave a five-star-rating, too, deeming Queen at Sea "one of the best films of the year."

The Hollywood Reporter said that the film was "striking, stirring and singularly unsentimental." Slant Magazine described it as a "wrenching, brilliantly acted tale of a family torn apart by dementia," saying that "no filmmaker has shown the aging body on film quite like Lance Hammer does across Queen at Sea," commending the director's "flawless precision". The New Statesman called the film "a brutal masterpiece about the end of life."

The cast's performances received particular praise. Time Out asserted, "Some films are hung on performances so remarkable, they simply must be seen, even if it destroys you," calling Juliette Binoche's turn "towering." Empire Magazine said, "there’s not a line of dialogue that doesn’t seem like it’s being thought for the first time, let alone said, via unshowy, underplayed but incredibly powerful performances."

=== Accolades ===
Award	Date of ceremony	Category	Nominee(s)	Result	Ref.
Berlin International Film Festival	22 February 2026	Golden Bear	Lance Hammer	Nominated	
Berlin International Film Festival	22 February 2026	Silver Bear Jury Prize	Lance Hammer	Won	
Berlin International Film Festival	22 February 2026	Silver Bear for Best Supporting Performance	Tom Courtenay	Won	
Berlin International Film Festival	22 February 2026	Silver Bear for Best Supporting Performance	Anna Calder-Marshall	Won	
British Independent Film Awards	6 December 2026	Best British Independent Film	Lance Hammer, Tristan Goligher	Pending	
British Independent Film Awards	6 December 2026	Best Lead Performance	Juliette Binoche	Pending	
British Independent Film Awards	6 December 2026	Best Supporting Performance	Anna Calder-Marshall	Pending	
British Independent Film Awards	6 December 2026	Best Supporting Performance	Tom Courtenay	Pending	
British Independent Film Awards	6 December 2026	Best Screenplay	Lance Hammer	Pending	
British Independent Film Awards	6 December 2026	Best Music Supervision	Connie Farr	Pending	
