= The Day the Fish Came Out =

1967 Greek–British comedy film by Michael Cacoyannis

- Cover of the film's novelisation
- Directed by: Michael Cacoyannis
- Written by: Michael Cacoyannis
- Produced by: Michael Cacoyannis
- Starring: Tom Courtenay; Colin Blakely; Sam Wanamaker
- Cinematography: Walter Lassally
- Edited by: Vassilis Syropoulos
- Music by: Mikis Theodorakis
- Distributed by: 20th Century-Fox International Classics
- Release date: 2 October 1967 (US)
- Running time: 109 min.
- Country: Greece / UK / US
- Language: English
- Budget: US$875,000

The Day the Fish Came Out (Greece: Όταν τα ψάρια βγήκαν στη στεριά Ótan ta psária vgíkan sti steriá) is a 1967 DeLuxe Color Greek–British comedy film directed and written by Michael Cacoyannis, who also designed the film's futuristic costumes. The film stars Tom Courtenay, Colin Blakely and Sam Wanamaker.

== Plot ==
The film, set in 1972 (five years after it was made), was inspired by an actual incident which occurred on 17 January 1966: a USAF Boeing B-52G Stratofortress collided with a Boeing KC-135 Stratotanker over Palomares, Spain, and four 1.1-megatonne hydrogen bombs aboard the B-52 were briefly lost. In a title sequence shot by Maurice Binder, a chorus of Spanish flamenco dancers explains why the film's location is Greece rather than Spain. Life on the remote fictional Greek island of Karos is changed for ever when atomic bombs are dropped there by a military plane which was rapidly losing power. Its nationality is not identified.

Life on the island is so bleak that some inhabitants stage a mass exodus, on hearing news that Denmark has opened Greenland to Greek emigration. The pilots drop their payload – two atomic weapons, and a mysterious box called simply "Container Q" – over land, because they are under orders not to drop at sea. They parachute out and land safely on the island, inexplicably wearing only their underwear. They have no equipment or means to contact their headquarters. Lacking resources – money to buy clothes or food, or even to pay for a long-distance call to base – they scour the island like vagabonds. Unknown to them, the military authorities have already deployed their own operation: a team of agents disguised as resort developers, searching for their cargo.

The agents buy the relevant part of the island from the inhabitants, ostensibly to build a hotel. Consequently, with encouragement from the mayor, the island suddenly fills with shiploads of clamouring, hedonistic tourists, to the dismay of the agents. Meanwhile, a poor goatherd and his wife find Container Q and, presuming it holds some treasure, they try to open it. Unsuccessful at first – because Container Q is virtually impregnable – the goatherd eventually steals a device that squirts acid that will eat through almost anything. Expecting gold, they instead find strange-looking stones. The agents are eventually led back to this panicked pair, but not before they throw Container Q into the sea, and the stones into a cistern which provides the island's water. The contents of Container Q – presumably highly toxic – thus begin to contaminate all the water being consumed on the island.

By nightfall, as tourists revel, the waters surrounding Karos become dotted with the bodies of dead and dying fish. The agents realise they are too late. The pilots, having begged enough small change from the tourists to call home, are shocked to be forced away from the long-distance phone in the post office by the agents. Only now do the pilots realise that the supposed developers are military operatives. The revellers continue dancing wildly, as a voice from a public address system pleads in vain for their attention, presumably to warn them of their imminent demise.

== Cast ==
- Tom Courtenay as navigator
- Colin Blakely as pilot
- Sam Wanamaker as James Elias
- Candice Bergen as Electra Brown
- Ian Ogilvy as Peter
- Dimitris Nikolaidis (as Dimitris Nicolaides) as dentist
- Nikos Alexiou (as Nicos Alexiou) as goatherd
- Patricia Burke as Mrs Mavroyannis
- Paris Alexander as Fred
- Arthur Mitchell as Frank
- Marlena Carrer as goatherd's wife
- Tom Klunis as Mr French
- William Berger as man in bed
- Kostas Papakonstantinou (as Costas Papaconstantinou) as Manolios
- Dora Stratou as travel agent
- Alexandros Lykourezos (as Alexander Lykourezos) as Director of Tourism

Uncredited

- Tom Whitehead as Mike
- Walter Granecki as base commander
- Dimitris Ioakeimidis as policeman
- James Connolly as tourist
- Assi Dayan as tourist
- Robert Killian as tourist
- Derek Kulai as tourist
- Keith Lancaster as tourist
- Alexis Mann as tourist
- Raymond McWilliams as tourist
- Michael Radford as tourist
- Peter Robinson as tourist
- Grigoris Stefanides as tourist
- Peter Stratful as tourist
- Costas Tymvios as tourist
- Herbert Zeichner as tourist
- Franc Roddam as extra

== Production ==
The film was written and directed by Michael Cacoyannis, who had enjoyed a big success with Zorba the Greek. Finance was provided by Twentieth Century-Fox, who described it as "a satirical contemporary comedy with serious overtones". The original cast announced in June 1966 was Tom Courtenay, James Fox, Colin Blakely and Elena Nathanael. (James Fox would ultimately drop out.)

Cacoyannis was reportedly keeping the script secret and showing the actors only their own parts. In July Candice Bergen joined the cast, in her third film. Bergen said the director cast her because he wanted an "arrogant type".

Filming started on 6 August 1966 in Greece. The location used for the town was Galaxidi. Bergen said filming was "heaven – the most fun I've had in ages."

== Reception ==
The film was not a critical success.

Time magazine's 13 October 1967 review called it a "1,000,000-mega-ton [sic] bomb" and suggested, "It may ... be the homosexiest movie since Modesty Blaise," referring in part to its stars Courtenay and Blakely as "spend[ing] the rest of the film in their Jockey shorts playing peekaboo with the villagers" and describing other male characters' costuming as "the cunningest [quaintest] white booties, fishnet T shirts, lavender and puce shorts."

The New York Times of 3 October 1967 agreed that the film contained superficially gay overtones, describing some of the film's characters as a "small group of conspicuously swishy young men" and the film as "conspicuously and even offensively campy." Among its other negative descriptions, it panned the film as "a fantastic dud," and "a totally amateurish effort ... shockingly pointless and unamusing".

According to Fox records, the film needed to earn $1,350,000 in rentals to break even, and made $1,590,000 by 11 December 1970, meaning it made a profit.
