= Silver Bear Jury Prize =

Award presented annually by the Berlin International Film Festival

- Silberner Bär Preis der Jury (German)
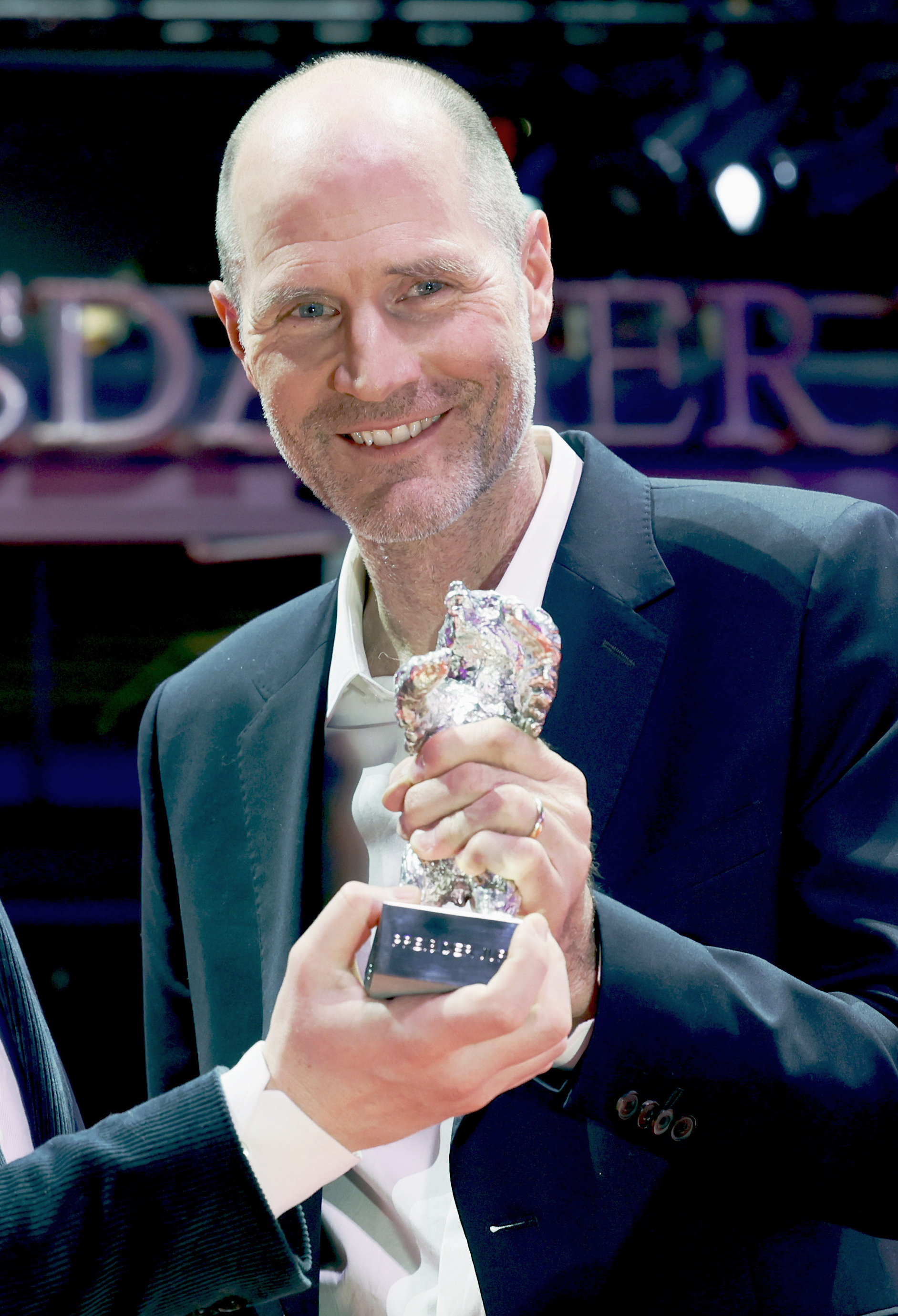
- 2026 recipient: Lance Hammer
- Location: Berlin
- Country: Germany
- Presented by: Berlin International Film Festival
- First award: 2021
- Winner: Queen at Sea by Lance Hammer

The Silver Bear Jury Prize (German: Silberner Bär Preis der Jury) is an award presented annually at the Berlin International Film Festival since 2021. It is chosen by the jury from the films in main competition at the festival. It is considered the third most prestigious prize after the Golden Bear and the Silver Bear Grand Jury Prize, respectively.

== History ==
The prize was introduced to replace the Alfred Bauer Prize, which was suspended in 2020 after it was revealed that its namesake Alfred Bauer, the founding director of the festival, had been an active high-ranking Nazi closely involved in a propaganda organisation set up by Joseph Goebbels. In its place, the international jury presented the "Silver Bear – 70th Berlinale" at the 2020 Festival. The new Silver Bear Jury Prize was first presented at the 2021 Festival, where Maria Speth was its inaugural winner.

== Winners ==
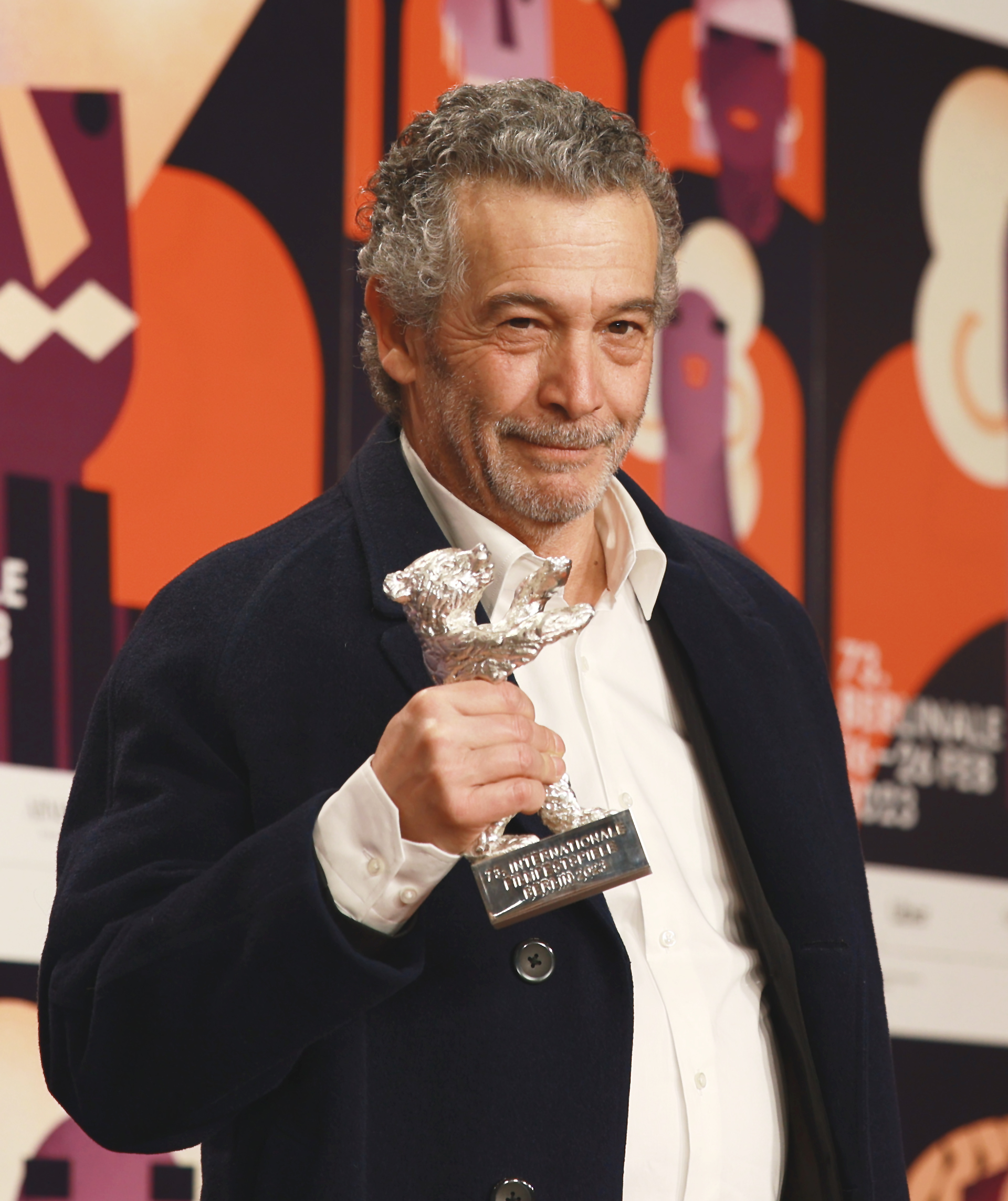
João Canijo won for Bad Living (2023)

=== 2020s ===
Year	English Title	Original Title	Director(s)	Production Country
2021 (71st)	Mr Bachmann and His Class	Herr Bachmann und seine Klasse	Maria Speth	Germany
2022 (72nd)	Robe of Gems	Manto de Gemas	Natalia López Gallardo	Mexico, Argentina, United States
2023 (73rd)	Bad Living	Mal Viver	João Canijo	Portugal, France
2024 (74th)	The Empire	L'Empire	Bruno Dumont	France, Germany, Italy, Belgium, Portugal
2025 (75th)	The Message	El mensaje	Iván Fund	Argentina, Spain
2026 (76th)	Queen at Sea		Lance Hammer	United Kingdom, United States
