= Elliott Tittensor =

English actor

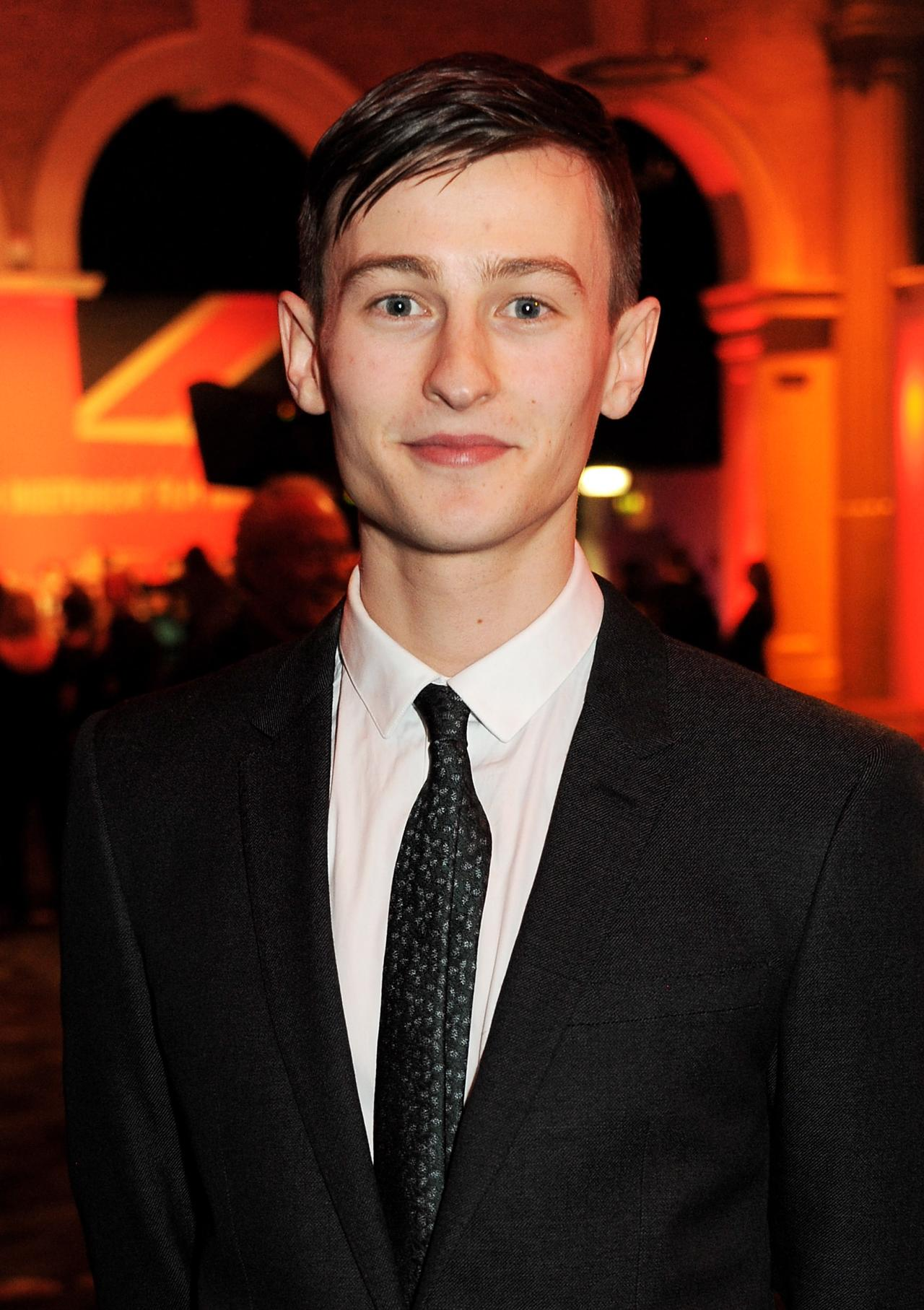
- Elliott Tittensor in 2015
- Born: Elliott John Tittensor; 3 November 1989 (age 36); Heywood, Greater Manchester, England
- Occupation: Actor
- Years active: 2003–2017, 2021–present
- Partner: Kaya Scodelario (2009–2014)
- Relatives: Luke Tittensor (twin brother) Ashley Tittensor (sister)

Elliott John Tittensor (born 3 November 1989) is an English actor.

== Career ==
Elliott Tittensor and his twin brother, Luke, appeared in the soap Brookside.

In the first series of the Channel 4 series Shameless, the Tittensor twins shared the role of Carl Gallagher. Elliott continued in the role after Luke left the show.

In 2022, he secured the role of Ser Erryk Cargyll in HBO's House of the Dragon, alongside Luke, who plays the role of Ser Arryk Cargyll.

== Personal life ==
Elliott Tittensor is the identical twin brother of Luke Tittensor. They are both from Heywood, Greater Manchester and attended Heywood Community High School.

They have an older sister, Ashley.

Whilst he was in a relationship with girlfriend Kaya Scodelario, Tittensor was arrested for a motoring incident while driving an uninsured car, causing the victim serious injuries and blindness. He pleaded guilty to driving without insurance and was successfully sued for damages arising out of his role in the incident.

== Filmography ==
=== Film ===
Year	Title	Role	Notes
2009	Protect Me from What I Want	Daz	Short film
2011	Charlie Says	Luke	Short film
2012	Spike Island	Gary Tits Titchfield	Film
2013	The Selfish Giant	Martin Fenton	Film
2014	Slap	Archie	Short film
2015	North v South	Terry Singer	Film
2016	Edith	Young Jake	Short film
2017	Dunkirk	Highlander 2	Film
2025	Straight Circle		Film

=== Television ===
Year	Title	Role	Notes
2003	Brookside	Niall Gibson	2 episodes
2004–2013	Shameless	Carl Gallagher	109 episodes
2007	True Dare Kiss	JJ	4 episodes
2009	Moving On	Ian Jacko Jackson	Episode 5: "Butterfly Effect"
2014	Chasing Shadows	John Meadows	Episodes: "Only Connect: Part 1" & "Only Connect: Part 2"
2016	Reg	Richard Keys	Television film
2010, 2021	Silent Witness	Scott Weston	Episodes: "Shadows" (2 parts) and "Redemption, Part 1" & "Redemption, Part 2"
2022–2024	House of the Dragon	Ser Erryk Cargyll	7 episodes
