= Silver Bear for Best Supporting Performance =

Award presented annually by the Berlin International Film Festival

- Silberner Bär/Bester Schauspielerische Leistung in einer Nebenrolle (German)
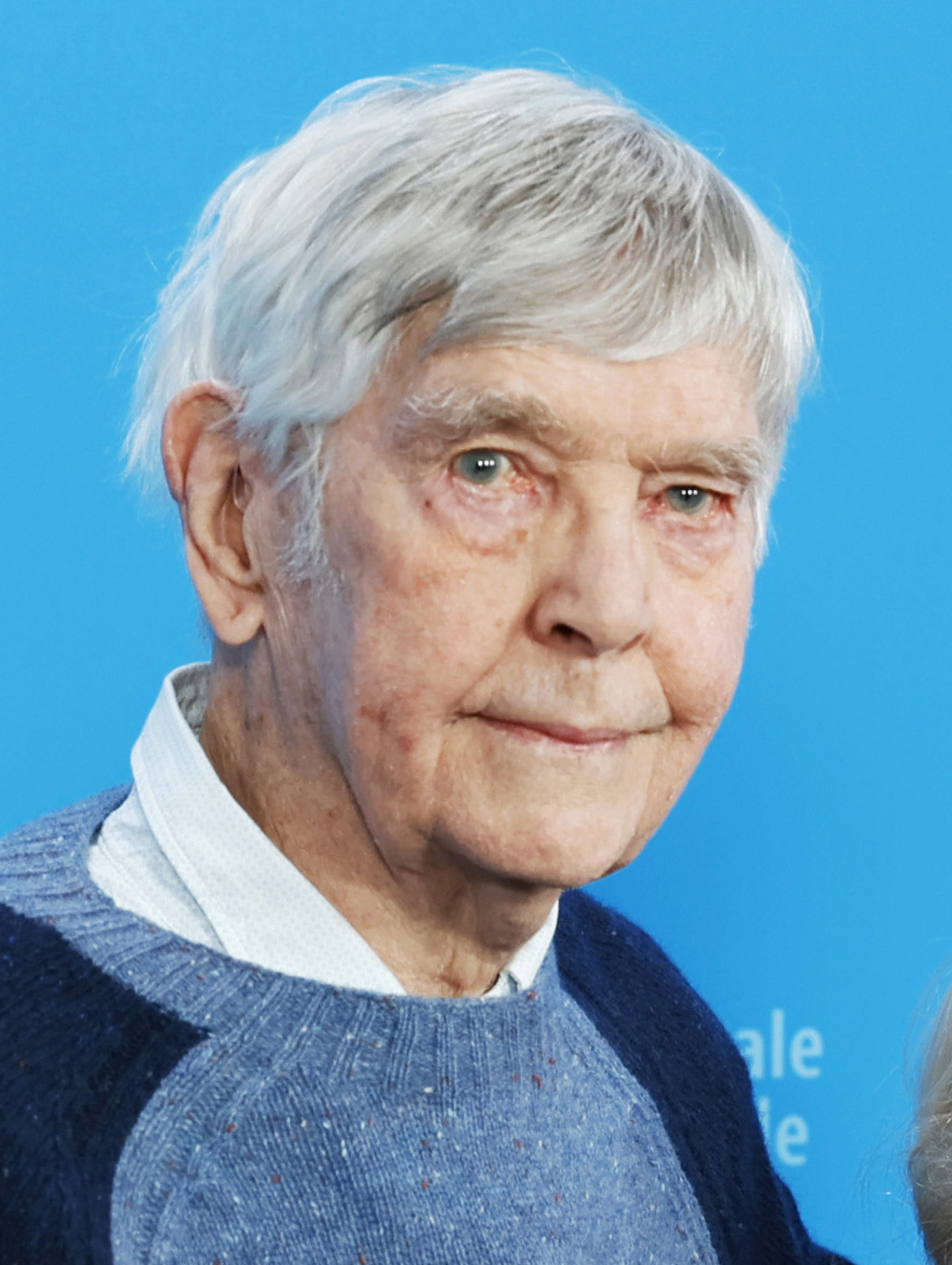
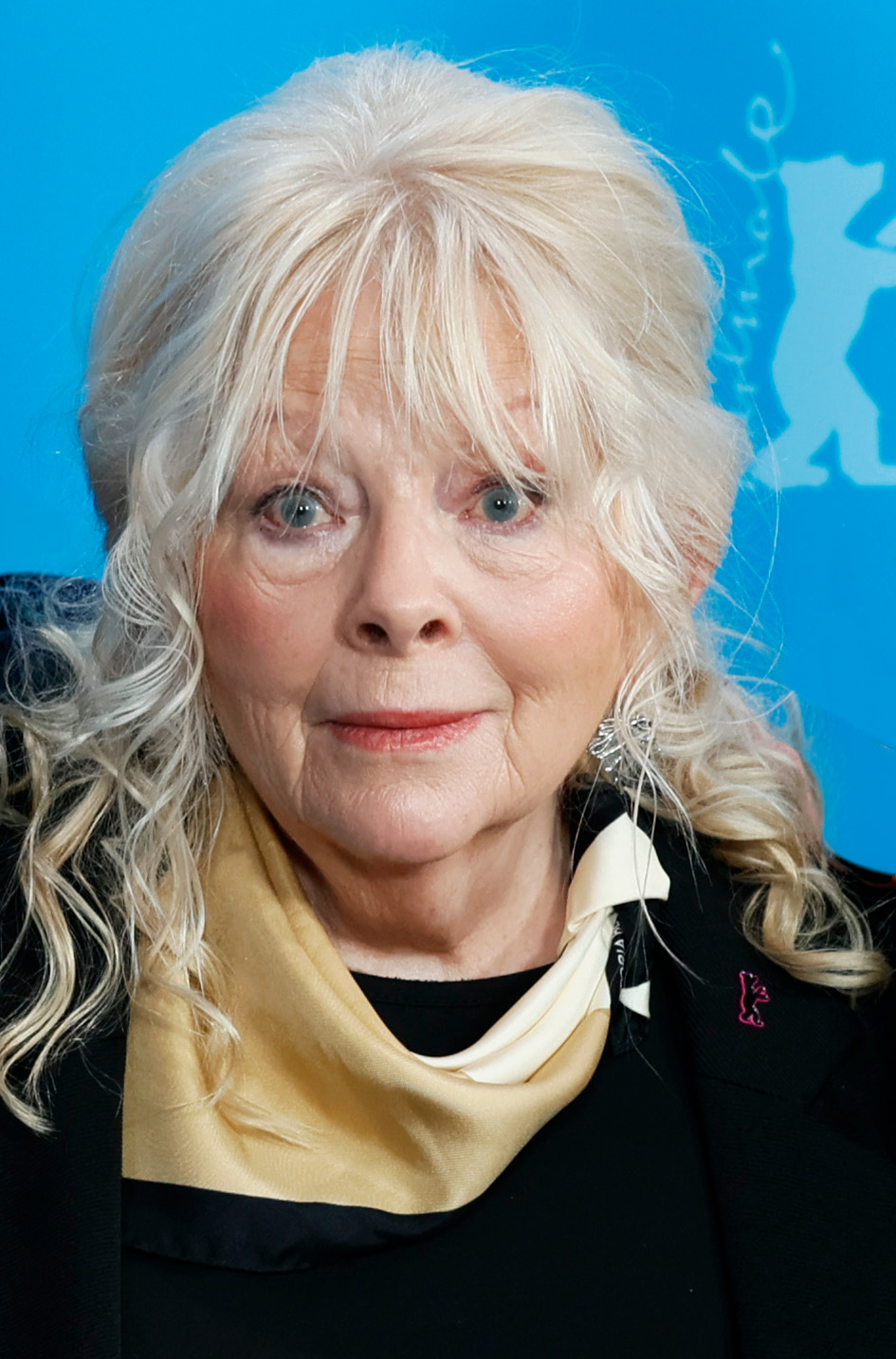
- 2026 recipients: Tom Courtenay and Anna Calder-Marshall
- Awarded for: Best Performance in a Supporting Role
- Country: Germany
- Presented by: Berlin International Film Festival
- First award: 2021
- Currently held by: Tom Courtenay and Anna Calder-Marshall; Queen at Sea (2026)
- Website: www.berlinale.de

The Silver Bear for Best Supporting Performance (German: Silberner Bär/Beste Schauspielerische Leistung in einer Nebenrolle) is an award presented at the Berlin International Film Festival for an outstanding performance in a supporting role and chosen by the jury from the films in main competition at the festival.

== History ==
At the 2021 Berlin International Film Festival, the Festival organization announced it would retire the Best Actor and Best Actress categories, adopting gender neutral categories, creating the Silver Bear for Best Leading Performance and the Best Supporting Performance category. The move was met with controversy, but intensified the gender neutral categories debate in other awards shows and festivals.

Lilla Kizlinger was the first recipient of this award for her role in Forest – I See You Everywhere (2021). Tom Courtenay and Anna Calder-Marshall are the most recent winners of this award for their performances in Queen at Sea (2026).

== Winners ==
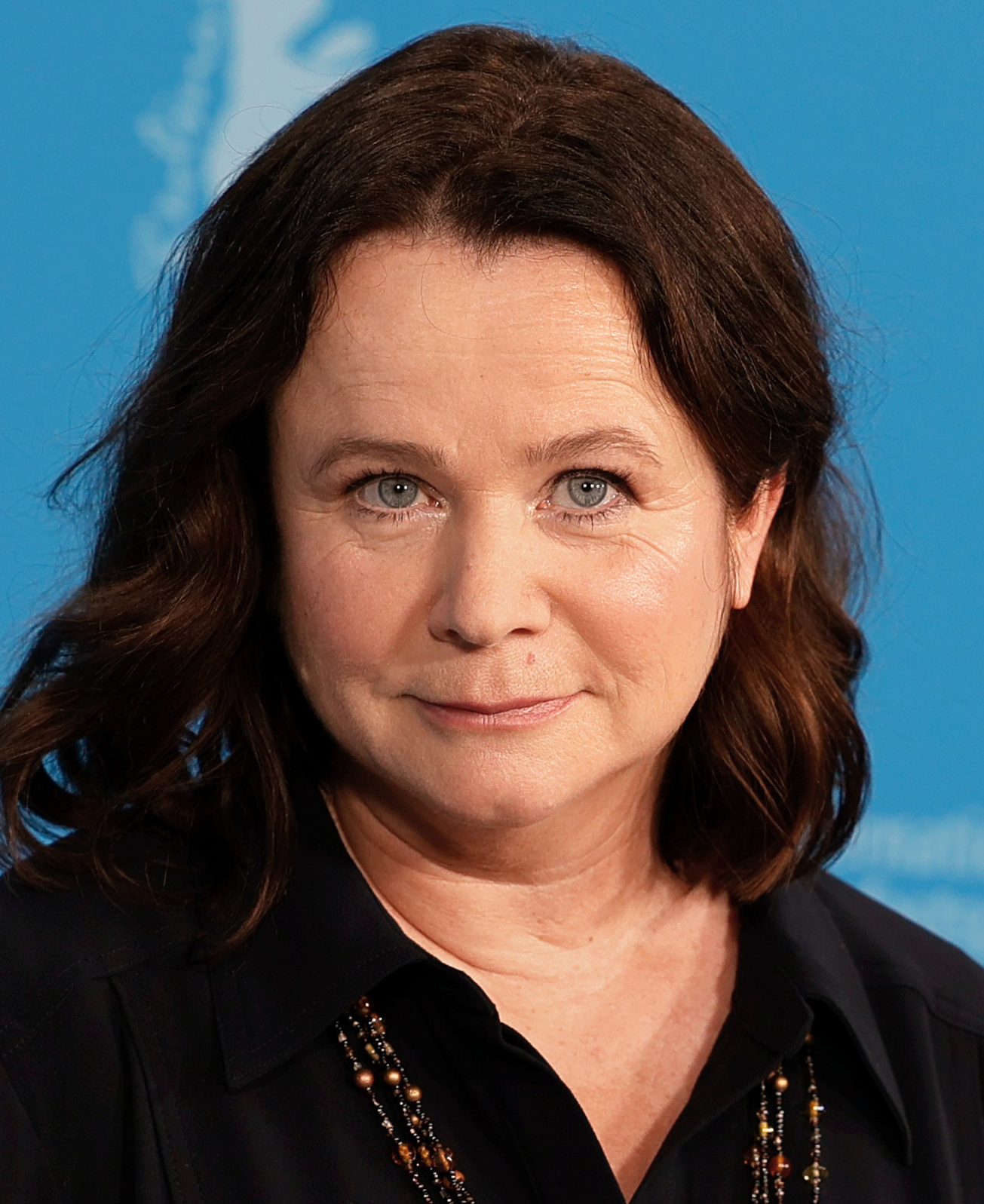
Emily Watson won for Small Things Like These (2024).

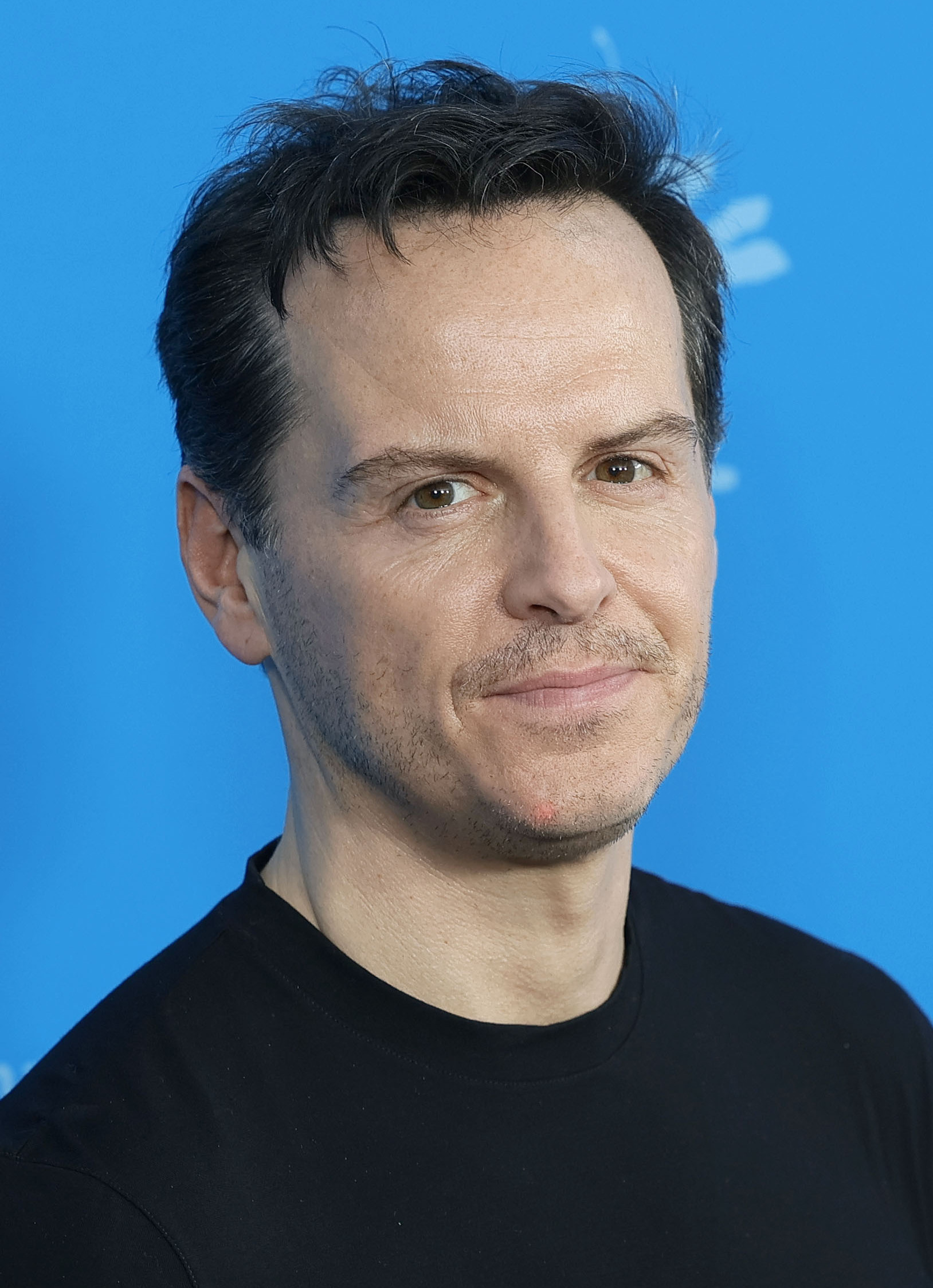
Andrew Scott won for Blue Moon (2025).

=== 2020s ===
Year	Actress	Role	English Title	Original Title	Ref.
2021	Lilla Kizlinger	Unnamed teenager girl	Forest – I See You Everywhere	Rengeteg – mindenhol látlak	
2022	Laura Basuki	Ino	Before, Now & Then	Nana	
2023	Thea Ehre	Leni	Till the End of the Night	Bis ans Ende der Nacht	
2024	Emily Watson	Sister Mary	Small Things Like These		
2025	Andrew Scott	Richard Rodgers	Blue Moon		
2026	Tom Courtenay	Martin	Queen at Sea		
2026	Anna Calder-Marshall	Leslie	Queen at Sea		

== See also ==
- Silver Bear for Best Leading Performance
