= Daz Eden =

Fictional character from Emmerdale

- Emmerdale character
- Portrayed by: Luke Tittensor
- Duration: 2003–2009
- First appearance: 9 October 2003
- Last appearance: 24 April 2009
- Introduced by: Steve Frost
In-universe information
- Other names: Darren Eden
- Occupation: Mechanic
- Father: Billy Hopwood
- Mother: Denise Eden
- Half-brothers: Andy Sugden
- Nephews: Jack Sugden
- Nieces: Sarah Sugden

Darren "Daz" Eden is a fictional character from the British ITV soap opera Emmerdale, played by Luke Tittensor. He made his first appearance in the show on 9 October 2003. Six years into his tenure on the soap, it was announced that Tittensor had been released from Emmerdale due to a conviction of grievous bodily harm. Following a meeting with the show's bosses, the decision was taken to terminate Tittensor's contract.

== Casting ==
Luke Tittensor was cast as Daz and made his first appearance in October 2003. At the age of 19, Tittensor was charged with grievous bodily harm after he attacked a 16-year-old. Since he pleaded guilty to the crime and due to the serious nature of the charge, ITV felt they "had no choice but to let the actor go". ITV also wanted to "enable him to focus on the court case". In a statement, ITV said: "As Luke has pleaded guilty to the serious charge of GBH and we cannot condone criminal behaviour, we have met with Luke and his agent to explain his contract with Emmerdale will be terminated. Luke regrets his behaviour and understands this situation." Jess Grieveson-Smith of Leeds Live wrote that ITV's sacking had been "unceremonious". His final scenes aired on 24 April 2009.

== Storylines ==
Daz was initially a troublemaker as he had a history of stealing cars but tried to make amends with community service. Things did not go according to plan. Katie used this to her advantage when she threatened Daz that if he told Andy about her affair with Robert, she would make sure that he went back into care. Daz ignored her and told Andy regardless so Katie carried out her threat after persuading Andy that Daz was lying. However, after learning the truth when Katie left Andy for Robert, he visited Daz and persuaded him to return to the farm.

Initially it was just Andy and Daz but needing money, Andy allowed Cain Dingle (Jeff Hordley) and his daughter, Debbie (Charley Webb), to move in. Daz got involved in Cain's schemes but a more serious problem was soon discovered. Andy and Debbie were having a relationship but kept it secret. When Cain found out, he told Andy to end the relationship or he would lead Daz astray. Wanting to protect Daz, Andy ended his relationship with Debbie, unaware that she was pregnant. Daz discovered Debbie's secret, weeks before the baby was due to be born. When she phoned, Daz found her in Seth Armstrong's (Stan Richards) old hide and almost delivered baby Sarah. He offered to stand by Debbie and Sarah but Debbie said no so Daz settled for being friends. For the first time in his life, Daz felt he had someone he could love unconditionally and was bereft when Debbie gave Sarah away. Daz did not want anything to do with Debbie but this was difficult as they were both friends with Jasmine Thomas (Jenna-Louise Coleman). Daz had a crush on Jasmine and was horrified to discover that she and Debbie were dating.

Meanwhile, at home, there were more problems. He and Belle Dingle (Eden Taylor-Draper) almost died after falling down an old mine shaft. Thankfully they were found and after a brief stay in hospital, given the all-clear and sent home. Daz finally felt loved, secure and settled at Butler's Farm until Andy's wife, Katie (Sammy Winward), returned. Everything fell apart as Daz could not believe Andy would forgive Katie and take her back so he demanded that Andy choose – him or Katie. Andy chose Katie and Daz stayed with Jack and Diane Sugden (Elizabeth Estensen). Jack was happy to have Daz permanently but Diane was recovering from colon cancer and did not feel she could cope with two teenagers. Jack suggested they adopt Daz but Diane said no and insisted he return to Butler's Farm. Daz, however, was not happy with this. Andy might have forgiven Katie but Daz had not and he made certain she knew. Following a heated argument, he kissed her and horrified, she pushed him away. He apologised and they agreed to forget it ever happened but Jo Stiles (Roxanne Pallett), Andy and Katie's lodger, saw them. She knew Katie wanted her to leave and threatened to tell Andy about her and Daz kissing unless Katie agreed she could stay.

Denise (now Lisa Parry) returned to the village and swearing she had reformed, asked Daz to move back in with her. Feeling guilty about kissing Katie, Daz agreed. Andy was upset by his departure but Daz returned a couple of months later with Pearl Ladderbanks (Meg Johnson). Diane phoned Denise to let her know Daz was safe and tried to help them reconcile. Denise visited but demanded Daz make amends to her boyfriend, fearing he'd leave, so Diane threw her out. She and Jack then started adoption proceedings. While Denise seemed happy to allow it, his father – Billy Hopwood (David Crellin) – was not. He opposed the adoption as he felt the Sugdens had already stolen one of his sons, he was not prepared to let them have both.

On his release from prison, Billy moved to the village. He got a job with King & Sons and moved into Edna Birch's (Shirley Stelfox) spare room. He tried to build relationships with Andy and Daz but Andy made it clear that Jack was his father. He also tried to make amends with Viv Hope (Deena Payne), Kelly Windsor (Adele Silva) and Donna Windsor-Dingle (Verity Rushworth). Jack was unhappy about Billy having contact with Daz, even after he saved Victoria Sugden's (Isabel Hodgins) life, but Daz and Billy bonded as father and son, regardless. Daz even took baby Sarah to see him when she returned to the village but Andy was angry and made Daz promise not to do it again. Daz's relationship with Billy was damaged when he found out that Billy was having an affair with Diane. When Victoria accidentally set fire to the house, injuring herself, Billy and Jack, Billy rescued Andy and Jack. All three were taken to hospital and made full recoveries. Needing a clean break, Billy discharged himself and left the area, moving to Sheffield. Following the fire, the Sugdens moved into Butler's Farm with Andy, Jo and Sarah. Overcrowding meant Daz decided to move in with Sam Dingle and his infant son, as he needed a lodger. He and his girlfriend, Penny Drury (Amelia Sefton), were happy as they had more room and fewer adults supervising them. Everything was fine until Samson found a vodka and coke and drank it so Sam rushed him to hospital. Luckily, he was fine but Daz asked Penny to apologise to Sam. She refused and called Sam names so Daz ended their relationship.

Daz was happy to stay single but Scarlett Nicholls (Kelsey-Beth Crossley) had other ideas. They met in early 2007 when she and her mother, Carrie (Linda Lusardi), moved to the village so Scarlett could get to know her half-brothers. Scarlett fancied him instantly and Daz found out when she made him a CD of what she thought were his favourite songs. Victoria had helped Scarlett with it but did not tell her that she was friends with Penny and did it as a practical joke. When Scarlett found out, she ran off and Daz went after her, telling her that he was flattered but was dating Penny and made both girls apologise. When Scarlett and Daz did get together, just after Scarlett's 16th birthday, Jimmy felt Daz was not good enough and that Scarlett was too young for boyfriends but Lexi talked him round. When Sam moved back in with the Dingles', Scarlett suggested she move in but Daz was not ready for that and asked his best mate, Jake Doland (James Baxter), to move in instead. Together, they made sure that Scarlett would not want to move in and it worked, thanks to some advice from Lexi. In early 2008, Jack went to Spain to look after his mother and Andy was in prison. Daz helped Jo on the farm but was unaware that a former inmate, who Andy had annoyed, was blackmailing her. He threatened to have Andy harmed if she did not do as he said and even threatened Sarah. Jo told Debbie, who – aided by Chas and the McFarlanes – made sure that Charlie would never return to Yorkshire. Jo's problems continued on Andy's release, when he started beating her. By autumn 2008, Andy's abuse had been exposed, but Daz refused to believe Jo, supporting Andy until he saw Andy threaten her. Horrified and disgusted, Daz turned against him. Weeks later, when Andy tried to see Jo, he and Daz argued, leading to him punching Andy. Daz was scared as he worried he was turning into Andy and his father. In December, Andy began to convince Daz he had changed. Daz was suspicious but could not prove anything. He was proved right when Lee Naylor caught Andy sabotaging farm equipment so Jo would ask him to mend it. During this time, Daz and Victoria became closer and kissed on Christmas Day 2008. Both felt guilty, as they were practically siblings, and were awkward around each other. Later that day, he and Victoria were on the lake when the ice cracked and Victoria fell in. Daz jumped in, looking for her, and pulled her out of the lake. He performed CPR, desperately trying to save her and succeeded. They were taken to hospital and kept in overnight. Later, Victoria told him she had seen a dead body in the lake. They found the body (Shane Doyle) a few days later and a police enquiry was launched.

On 5 February 2009, Annie Sugden (Sheila Mercier) phoned The Woolpack, informing them of Jack's death. Daz was devastated to lose the father figure he loved and respected. He was one of the pallbearers at Jack's funeral. When Annie revealed that Jack had wanted Andy to take over as head of the family, he moved into Butler's Farm with Andy, who also reclaimed his daughter from the Dingles. At this point, Victoria decided to live with Annie in Spain. This upset Daz and the night of the funeral, Daz said he could not imagine life in the village without her and would miss her too much. She asked what their relationship was and he told her he was not sure. He was thrown by the chemistry between them, just as she was, but knew the village saw them as brother and sister. Encouraged by what Daz had said, Victoria agreed to move into Butler's Farm too.

In April, Daz took Victoria out for a drive in a sports car as a birthday present. It was meant to be Scarlett, Daz and Victoria but the car was a two-seater so Scarlett insisted Daz take Victoria. Daz suggested sending the car back but Scarlett would not hear of it. Following a row, after they got lost, Daz and Victoria slept together in a deserted barn. Victoria was thrilled, thinking she and Daz were a couple now but Daz told her that he was not going to dump Scarlett. He felt guilty about cheating on Scarlett and told Victoria that it was a mistake and they should forget about it. Victoria hoped Daz would change his mind but when he did not, Victoria told him that she was pregnant, just as he and Scarlett were going away for a weekend. The weekend was a disaster as he kept thinking of Victoria and on his return, Daz took Victoria for a drive. He told Victoria that she'd have to see a doctor and that people would think he was a pervert if they announced that she was expecting his baby, so Victoria admitted she'd lied. Furious, Daz moved back into Dale View with Jake. Knowing Daz would be annoyed, Victoria reconciled with Aaron Livesy (Danny Miller). In May, Aaron and Victoria slept together and, thinking Daz and Jake would be at work, she "borrowed" Jake's keys and took Aaron to Dale View. Daz and Scarlett went home for lunch and found them there. Angry, Daz went for Aaron and trying to stop them fighting, Victoria blurted out that Daz did not want her any more, making Aaron and Scarlett realise Daz and Victoria's relationship was more than brother/sister. Horrified, Daz tried to repair the damage but Aaron and Scarlett did not want to know. Scarlett rushed home in tears and Aaron told Andy about Daz and Victoria's new relationship. Disgusted, Andy threw Daz out, ordering him to leave and never return. Daz was reluctant but felt he had no choice and left with only Jake to see him off. He stopped at the farm, perhaps wanting to see Victoria but did not stay, not wanting to risk seeing Andy.

== Reception ==
For his role as Daz, Tittensor was nominated for "Best Young Actor" at the 2007 Inside Soap Awards.
