= Tom Courtenay =

British actor (born 1937)

Sir Tom Courtenay
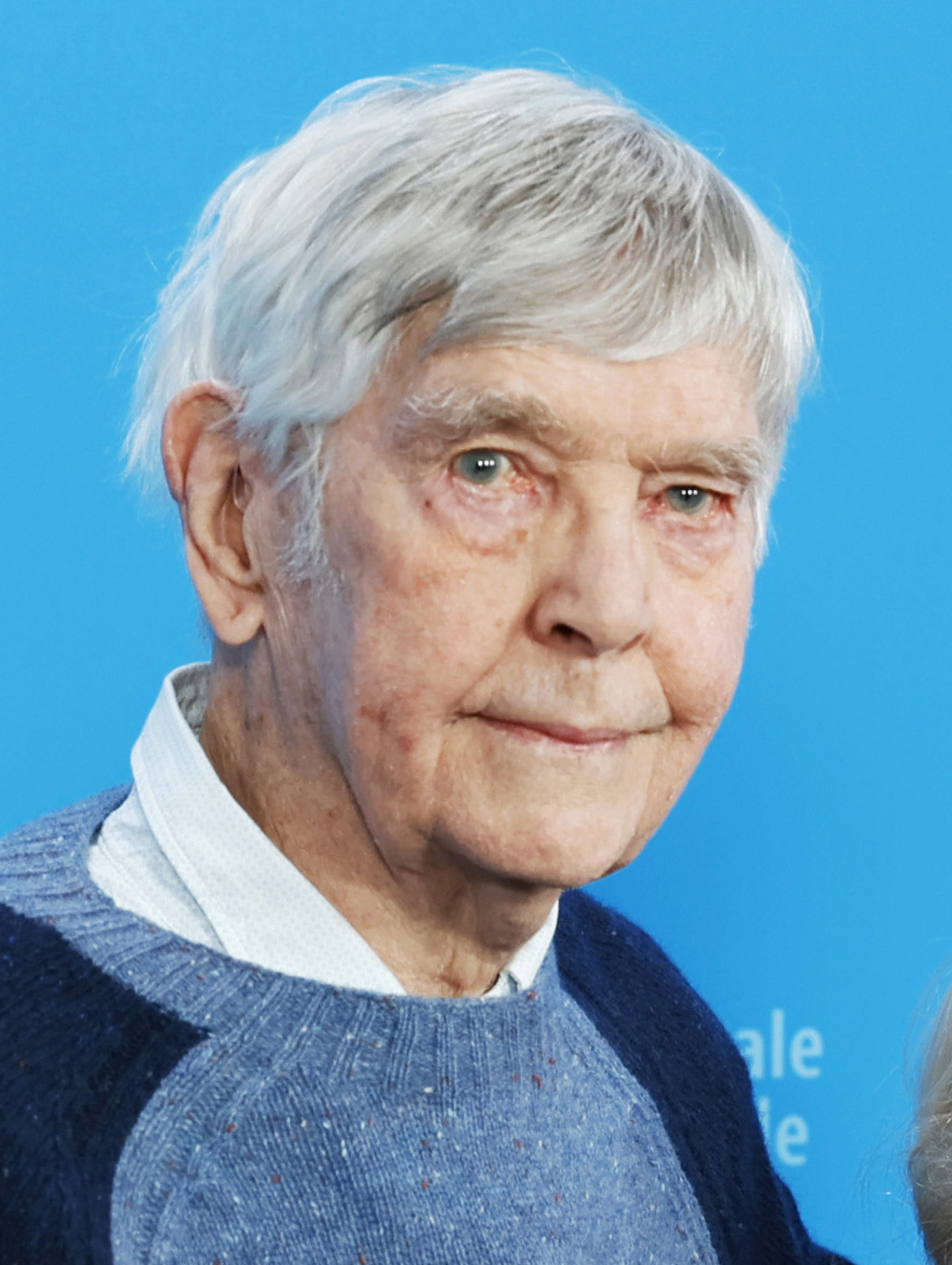
- Courtenay in 2026
- Born: Thomas Daniel Courtenay; 25 February 1937 (age 89); Hull, East Riding of Yorkshire, England
- Occupation: Actor
- Years active: 1960–present
- Spouses: Cheryl Kennedy (m. 1973; div. 1982) Isabel Crossley (m. 1988)

Sir Thomas Daniel Courtenay (/ˈkɔːrtni/; born 25 February 1937) is an English actor. A notable figure of the British New Wave, he has received numerous accolades, including three BAFTAs, a Golden Globe, two Silver Bears, and a Volpi Cup, in addition to nominations for two Academy Awards, two Tony Awards, and a Primetime Emmy Award. He was knighted for his services to cinema and theatre in the 2001 New Year Honours.

After studying at the Royal Academy of Dramatic Art, Courtenay earned the BAFTA Award for Most Promising Newcomer for his breakthrough role in the coming-of-age film The Loneliness of the Long Distance Runner (1962) and a nomination for the Academy Award for Best Supporting Actor for his role in David Lean's epic Doctor Zhivago (1965). Other notable film roles during this period include Billy Liar (1963), King and Country (1964), King Rat (1965), and The Night of the Generals (1967).

For his performance in the 1983 film adaptation of the play The Dresser, in which he reprised the role of Norman he originated both on the West End and Broadway, Courtenay won the Golden Globe Award and received Academy and BAFTA Award nominations for Best Actor. His later roles include Last Orders (2001), Nicholas Nickleby (2002), Quartet (2012), 45 Years (2015), The Guernsey Literary and Potato Peel Pie Society (2018) and Queen at Sea (2026).

Courtenay received two British Academy Television Awards for his performances in the television film A Rather English Marriage (1998) and the first series of the crime drama Unforgotten (2015) as well as a nomination for the Primetime Emmy Award for the PBS miniseries Little Dorrit (2008).

== Life and career ==
=== Early years and education ===
Courtenay was born on 25 February 1937 in Kingston upon Hull, East Riding of Yorkshire, the son of Annie Eliza (née Quest) and Thomas Henry Courtenay, a boat painter in Hull fish docks. He attended Kingston High School and went on to study English at University College London, where he failed his degree. After this he studied drama at the Royal Academy of Dramatic Art (RADA) in London.

=== 1960–1977 ===
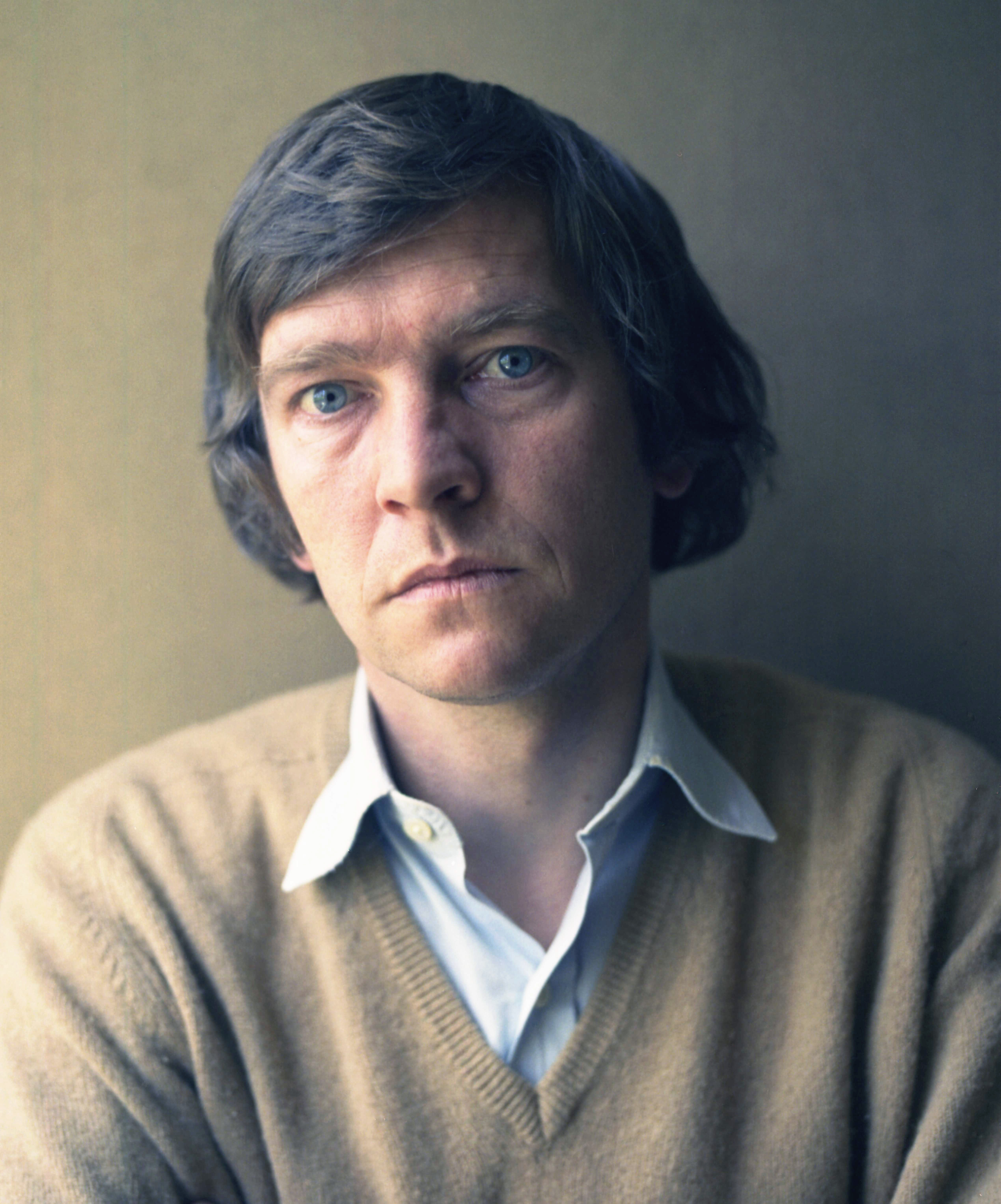
Courtenay in 1973

Courtenay made his stage debut in 1960 with the Old Vic theatre company at the Lyceum, Edinburgh, before taking over from Albert Finney in the title role of Billy Liar at the Cambridge Theatre in 1961. In 1963, he played that same title role in the film version, directed by John Schlesinger. He said of Albert Finney, "We both have the same problem, overcoming the flat harsh speech of the North."

Courtenay's film debut was in 1962 with Private Potter, directed by Finnish-born director Caspar Wrede, who had first spotted Courtenay while he was still at RADA. This was followed by The Loneliness of the Long Distance Runner, directed by Tony Richardson, and Billy Liar, two highly acclaimed films and performances which helped usher in the British New Wave of the early-to-mid-1960s. For these performances Courtenay was awarded the 1962 BAFTA Award for most promising newcomer and the 1963 BAFTA Award for best actor respectively. He also was the first to record the song Mrs. Brown, You've Got a Lovely Daughter, doing so for the TV play The Lads. The song was released by Decca on a 45 rpm record.

For his role as the dedicated revolutionary leader Pasha Antipov in Doctor Zhivago (1965), he was nominated for an Academy Award for Best Supporting Actor, but was bested by Martin Balsam. Among his other well-known films are King and Country, directed by Joseph Losey, where he played opposite Dirk Bogarde; the all-star war film, Operation Crossbow, directed by Michael Anderson (starring George Peppard and Sophia Loren); King Rat, directed by Bryan Forbes and costarring James Fox and George Segal; and The Night of the Generals, directed by Anatole Litvak with Peter O'Toole and Omar Sharif. He provided slapstick comedy in the ultimately chilling anti-nuclear weapon black comedy The Day the Fish Came Out in 1967. In 1968 he co-starred in the spy movie A Dandy in Aspic, opposite Laurence Harvey. He then appeared in two spy comedies, first Otley (1969), in the title role, and then Catch Me A Spy (1971), starring Kirk Douglas. Courtenay's working relationship with Wrede returned to film when he played the title role in the latter's 1970 production of One Day in the Life of Ivan Denisovich.

Despite being catapulted to fame by the aforementioned films, Courtenay has said that he has not particularly enjoyed film acting; from the mid-1960s he concentrated more on stage work, although in a later Telegraph interview on 20 April 2005, he admitted "I slightly overdid the anti-film thing". In 1968, Courtenay began a long association with Manchester when he played in The Playboy of the Western World for the Century Theatre at Manchester University directed by Michael Elliott. In 1969, Courtenay played Hamlet (John Nettles playing Laertes) for 69 Theatre Company at University Theatre in Manchester, this being the precursor of the Royal Exchange Theatre, which was founded in 1976 where he was to give many performances, firstly under the direction of Casper Wrede. His first roles for the Royal Exchange were as Faulkland in Richard Brinsley Sheridan's The Rivals and the hero of Heinrich von Kleist's The Prince of Homburg. Since then he has played a variety of roles, including in 1999 the leading role in the theatre's production of King Lear, and in 2001 Uncle Vanya.

=== 1980–1999 ===
Courtenay originated the role of Norman in Ronald Harwood's The Dresser which was first produced in the West End in 1980. The production started at Royal Exchange, Manchester before transferring to the Queen's Theatre. Courtenay acted opposite Freddie Jones as Sir. The production earned the Laurence Olivier Award for Best Play. He then reprised his role on Broadway at the Brooks Atkinson Theatre in 1981, acting opposite Paul Rogers. Courtenay received nominations for the Tony Award for Best Actor in a Play and the Drama Desk Award for Outstanding Actor in a Play for his performance. He then was cast as Norman in the film adaptation of The Dresser (1983), acting opposite Albert Finney as Sir with performances from Eileen Atkins, Edward Fox, and Michael Gough. Famed critic from the Chicago Sun-Times, Roger Ebert praised Courtenay for his performance writing, "He is perfect for playing proud, resentful, self-doubting outsiders." Both Courtenay and Finney received nominations for Best Actor in the 1983 Academy Awards for their roles, losing to Robert Duvall in Tender Mercies.

He played the father of Derek Bentley (Christopher Eccleston) in the 1991 film Let Him Have It. Though he has appeared in many well-regarded films, Courtenay co-starred in what's been considered one of the worst movies ever, the infamous Leonard Part 6 starring Bill Cosby. Courtenay's television and radio appearances have been relatively few, but have included She Stoops to Conquer in 1971 on BBC and several Ayckbourn plays. He appeared in I Heard the Owl Call My Name on US television in 1973. In 1994, he starred as Quilp opposite Peter Ustinov in a Disney Channel 'made for television' version of The Old Curiosity Shop. Rather unexpectedly, he had a cameo role as the anthropologist Bronisław Malinowski in the George Lucas 1995 US TV film Young Indiana Jones and the Treasure of the Peacock's Eye. In 1998 he teamed with Albert Finney again for the acclaimed BBC drama A Rather English Marriage.

=== 2001–present ===
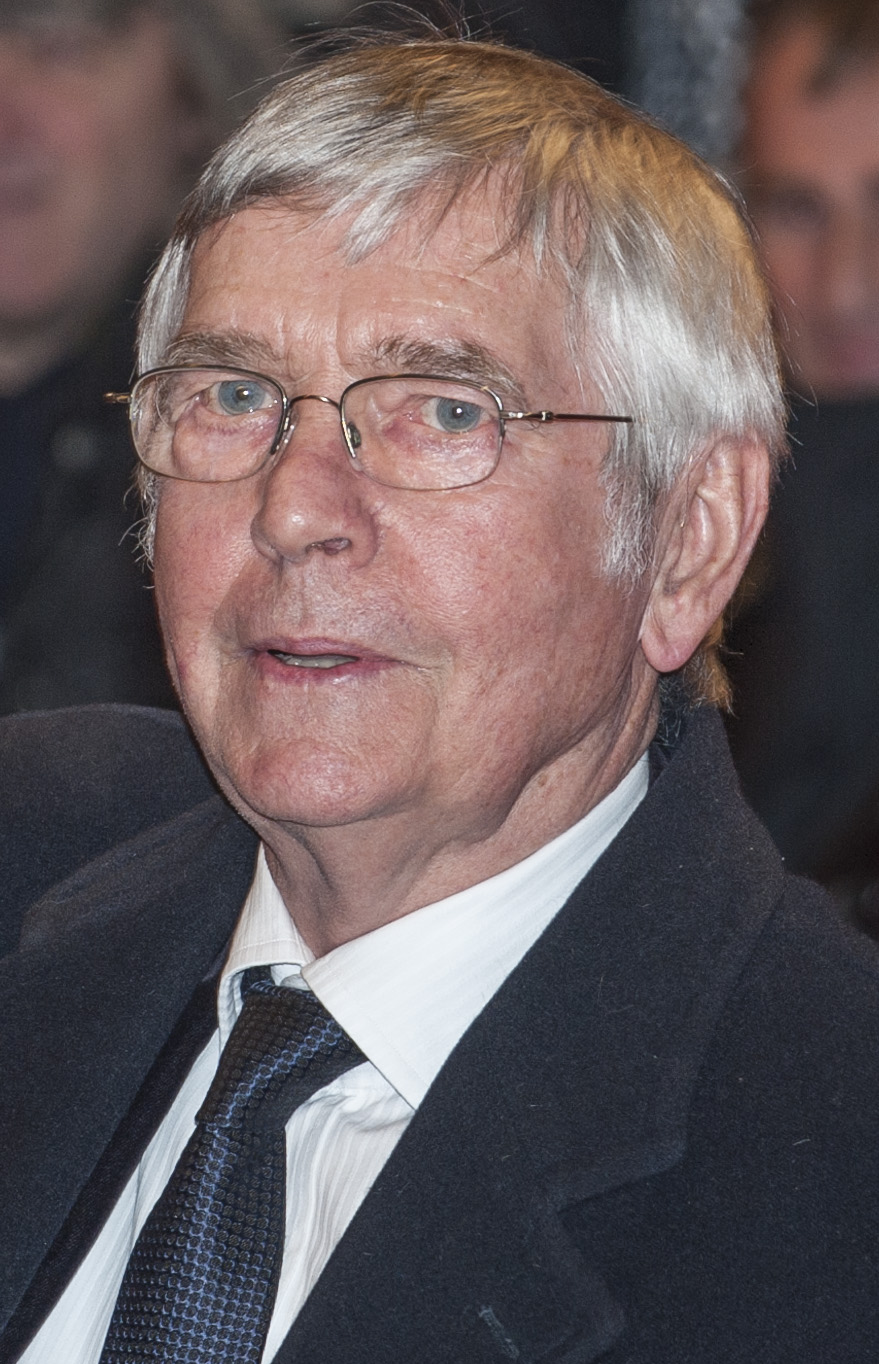
Courtenay at the premiere of 45 Years (2015) in the 65th Berlinale

In 2002, based on an idea by Michael Godley, Courtenay compiled a one-man show Pretending To Be Me based on the letters and writings of poet Philip Larkin, which first played at the West Yorkshire Playhouse in Leeds. It later transferred to the Comedy Theatre in the West End in London. In 2007, Courtenay appeared in two films: Flood, a disaster epic in which London is overwhelmed by floods, and The Golden Compass, an adaptation of Philip Pullman's novel, playing the part of Farder Coram. In 2008, he appeared in the BBC adaptation of Little Dorrit by Charles Dickens, playing William Dorrit, and the Christmas edition of The Royle Family, playing David (Senior), alongside Helen Fraser as Dave's mother, who had played his girlfriend in Billy Liar. In March 2011, he joined the cast of Gambit, a film starring fellow RADA alumnus Alan Rickman that began filming in May. The film was released in Great Britain in November 2012. He played the role of God, opposite Sebastian Graham-Jones, in Ben Steiner's radio play A Brief Interruption, broadcast on BBC Radio 4 in 2004. In the same year, he played the role of Stanley Laurel in Neil Brand's radio play Stan, broadcast on Radio 4. Also for Radio 4, he played the title role in Nick Leather's The Domino Man of Lancashire and Maurice in Richard Lumsden's Man in the Moon, both broadcast in 2007.

In 2012, he co-starred in romantic drama Quartet alongside Maggie Smith, directed by Dustin Hoffman. It premiered at the Toronto International Film Festival to positive reviews. In 2015, he co-starred with Charlotte Rampling in the highly-praised Andrew Haigh film, 45 Years. Courtenay won international awards including the Berlin International Film Festival's Silver Bear for his role as Geoff Mercer, and the film was critically-acclaimed and very well-received internationally as well as in the U.S. In 2018, he appeared in The Guernsey Literary and Potato Peel Pie Society starring Lily James and King of Thieves alongside Michael Caine and Michael Gambon.

In 2019, he was a panellist on Harry Hill's Alien Fun Capsule, Season 3 episode 1. For his introduction, after the other 3 guests had been announced Harry expressed surprise that the fourth seat (Courtenay's) was empty. Harry said he knew the guest had set off some time ago, which was followed by a cut to the 1962 film The Loneliness of the Long Distance Runner in which Courtenay's character was running. Courtenay then entered the studio, apparently out of breath and in the same running kit he'd been wearing in the film. Also in 2019 he voiced the character of Prince Philip in The Queen's Corgi, his first voice role, and also appeared in The Aeronauts starring Felicity Jones and Eddie Redmayne.

In 2026, for his role in Queen at Sea, Courtenay won the Silver Bear for Best Supporting Performance, shared with Anna Calder-Marshall.

=== Personal life ===
Courtenay married actress Cheryl Kennedy in 1973. They divorced in 1982. In 1988, he married Isabel Crossley, a stage manager at the Royal Exchange Theatre in Manchester. They have homes in Manchester and Putney in London.

In 2000, Courtenay's memoir Dear Tom: Letters From Home was published to critical acclaim. It comprises a selection of the letters exchanged between Courtenay and his mother, interspersed with his own recollections of life as a young student actor in London in the early 1960s.

Courtenay is the President of Hull City AFC's Official Supporters' Club. In 1999, Courtenay was awarded an honorary doctorate by Hull University. In 2018, he was bestowed the Honorary Freedom of the City of Hull.

== Acting credits ==
=== Film ===
Year	Title	Role	Notes
1962	Private Potter	Private Potter	
1962	The Loneliness of the Long Distance Runner	Colin Smith	
1963	Billy Liar	Billy Fisher	
1964	King and Country	Private Hamp	
1965	Operation Crossbow	Robert Henshaw	
1965	King Rat	Lt. Robin Grey	
1965	Doctor Zhivago	Pasha Antipov / Strelnikov	
1967	The Night of the Generals	Lance Cpl. Kurt Hartmann	
1967	The Day the Fish Came Out	The Navigator	
1968	A Dandy in Aspic	Gatiss	
1968	Otley	Gerald Arthur Otley	
1970	One Day in the Life of Ivan Denisovich	Ivan Denisovich	
1971	To Catch a Spy	Baxter Clarke	
1971	She Stoops to Conquer	Marlow	BBC TV production
1973	I Heard the Owl Call My Name	Mark Brian	CBS TV production
1983	The Dresser	Norman	
1985	Me and the Girls (Noël Coward)	George Banks	BBC TV production
1987	Happy New Year	Edward Saunders	
1987	Leonard Part 6	Frayn	
1991	The Last Butterfly	Antoine Moreau	
1991	Let Him Have It	William Bentley	
1996	Famous Fred	Kenneth	
1996	The Boy from Mercury	Uncle Tony Cronin	
1998	A Rather English Marriage	Southgate	
1999	Whatever Happened to Harold Smith?	Harold Smith	
2001	Last Orders	Vic	
2002	Nicholas Nickleby	Newman Noggs	
2007	Flood	Leonard Morrison	
2007	The Golden Compass	Farder Coram	
2011	Gambit	The Major	
2012	Quartet	Reginald Paget	
2013	Night Train to Lisbon	Older João Eca	
2015	45 Years	Geoff Mercer	
2015	The Legend of Barney Thomson	Chief Superintendent McManaman	
2016	Dad's Army	Lance Corporal Jones	Film adaptation of original BBC sitcom
2018	The Guernsey Literary and Potato Peel Pie Society	Eben Ramsey	
2018	King of Thieves	John Kenny Collins	
2019	The Queen's Corgi	Prince Philip	Voice only
2019	The Aeronauts	Arthur Glaisher	
2020	Summerland	Mr Sullivan	
2022	The Railway Children Return	Uncle Walter	
2026	Queen at Sea	Martin	

=== Television ===
Year	Title	Role	Notes
1960	Inside Story	Bert	Episode: "A Present for Penny"
1970	Solo	D. H. Lawrence	Episode: "Tom Courtenay as D. H. Lawrence"
1973	I Heard the Owl Call My Name	Mark Brian	Television film
1998	Kavanagh QC	Felix Crawley	Episode: "Memento Mori"
2007	Little Dorrit	Mr. Dorrit	14 episodes
2008	The Royle Family	David Best, Sr.	Episode: "The New Sofa"
2015	Unforgotten	Eric Slater	6 episodes
2017	Grandpa's Great Escape	Grandpa	Television film
2021	The North Water	Baxter	2 episodes
2022	Mandy	Engineer Woodcock	Episode: "Fatberg"
2026	Maya	George	

=== Theatre ===
His roles include:

Year	Title	Role	Playwright	Venue
1960	The Seagull	Konstantin Trepylef	Anton Chekhov	The Old Vic, London
1961	Henry IV, Part 1	Poins	William Shakespeare	The Old Vic, London
1961	Twelfth Night	Feste	William Shakespeare	The Old Vic, London
1961	Billy Liar	Billy Fisher	Keith Waterhouse	The Cambridge Theatre, London
1964	Andorra	Andri	Max Frisch	The National Theatre Company at the Old Vic
1966	The Cherry Orchard	Trofimov	Anton Chekhov	The Chichester Festival Theatre
1966	Macbeth	Malcolm	William Shakespeare	The Chichester Festival Theatre
1967	Charley's Aunt	Lord Fancourt Babberley	Brandon Thomas	University of Manchester Theatre
1968	The Playboy of the Western World	Christy Mahon	John Millington Synge	University of Manchester Theatre
1968	Romeo and Juliet	Romeo	William Shakespeare	University of Manchester Theatre
1968	Hamlet	Performer	William Shakespeare	Edinburgh Festival
1969	She Stoops to Conquer	Young Marlow	Oliver Goldsmith	University of Manchester Theatre; Garrick Theatre, London
1970	Peer Gynt	Performer	Henrik Ibsen	University of Manchester Theatre
1972	Charley's Aunt	Lord Fancourt Babberley	Brandon Thomas	the University of Manchester Theatre; Apollo Theatre, London
1972	Time and Time Again	Leonard	Alan Ayckbourn	Comedy Theatre, London
1973	Arms and the Man	Captain Bluntschli	George Bernard Shaw	Royal Exchange, Manchester
1974	The Norman Conquests	Norman	Alan Ayckbourn	Greenwich Theatre; Globe Theatre
1975	The Fool	John Clarke	Edward Bond	Royal Court Theatre
1976	The Rivals	Faulkland	Richard Brinsley Sheridan	Royal Exchange, Manchester
1976	The Prince of Homburg	Performer	Heinrich von Kleist	Royal Exchange, Manchester
1977	Otherwise Engaged	Simon	Simon Gray	Plymouth Theatre, New York
1978	Twelfth Night	Malvolio	William Shakespeare	Royal Exchange, Manchester
1978	Clouds	Owen	Michael Frayn	Duke of York's Theatre, London
1978	Crime and Punishment	Raskolnikov	Fyodor Dostoevsky	Royal Exchange, Manchester
1980; 1981	The Dresser	Norman	Ronald Harwood	Royal Exchange, Manchester; Queens Theatre, London; Brooks Atkinson Theatre, New York
1981	The Misanthrope	Alceste	Molière	Royal Exchange, Manchester
1982	Andy Capp	Andy Capp	James Maxwell / Alan Price	Royal Exchange, Manchester
1984	Jumpers	George	Tom Stoppard	Royal Exchange, Manchester
1986	Rookery Nook	Performer	Ben Travers	Shaftesbury Theatre, London
1987	The Hypochondriac	Performer	Molière	Lyric Theatre (Hammersmith)
1988	Dealing with Clair	Performer	Martin Crimp	Orange Tree Theatre, Richmond
1992	The Miser	Harpagon	Molière	Royal Exchange, Manchester
1993	Poison Pen	Eric Wells	Ronald Harwood	Royal Exchange, Manchester
1993	Moscow Stations	Performer	Venedict Yerofeyev	Traverse Theatre, Edinburgh
1995	Uncle Vanya	Ivan	Anton Chekhov	Circle in the Square Theatre, New York
1996	'Art'	Serge	Yasmina Reza	Wyndham's Theatre, London
1999	King Lear	King Lear	William Shakespeare	Royal Exchange, Manchester
2001	Uncle Vanya	Vanya	Anton Chekhov	Royal Exchange, Manchester
2003	Pretending To Be Me	Performer	Philip Larkin	West Yorkshire Playhouse
2026	'Road'	Jerry (Video Only)	Jim Cartwright	Royal Exchange, Manchester

=== Singles ===
- "Mrs. Brown, You've Got a Lovely Daughter" (1963), Decca F 11729. Originally sung by Courtenay in The Lads, a British 1963 TV play.

== Awards and nominations ==
Year	Association	Category	Nominated work	Result	Ref
1962	BAFTA Award	Most Promising Newcomer to Leading Film Roles	The Loneliness of the Long Distance Runner	Won	
1963	BAFTA Award	Best British Actor	Billy Liar	Nominated	
1964	Venice International Film Festival	Volpi Cup for Best Actor	King & Country	Won	
1964	BAFTA Award	Best British Actor	King & Country	Nominated	
1965	Academy Award	Best Supporting Actor	Doctor Zhivago	Nominated	
1977	Tony Award	Best Actor in a Play	Otherwise Engaged	Nominated	
1980	Olivier Award	Actor of the Year in a New Play	The Dresser	Nominated	
1982	Tony Award	Best Actor in a Play	The Dresser	Nominated	
1983	Academy Award	Best Actor	The Dresser	Nominated	
1983	BAFTA Award	Best Actor in a Leading Role	The Dresser	Nominated	
1983	Golden Globe Award	Best Actor in a Motion Picture Drama	The Dresser	Won	
1998	BAFTA TV Award	Best Actor	A Rather English Marriage	Won	
2001	National Board of Review	Best Cast	Last Orders	Won	
2001	European Film Award	Best Actor	Last Orders	Nominated	
2002	National Board of Review	Best Cast	Nicholas Nickleby	Won	
2007	Primetime Emmy Award	Outstanding Supporting Actor in a Miniseries or Movie	Little Dorrit	Nominated	
2015	BAFTA TV Award	Best Supporting Actor	Unforgotten	Won	
2015	Berlin International Film Festival	Silver Bear for Best Actor	45 Years	Won	
2015	London Film Critics' Circle Award	Actor of the Year	45 Years	Won	
2015	British Independent Film Award	Best Actor	45 Years	Nominated	
2015	European Film Award	Best Actor	45 Years	Nominated	
2015	Evening Standard British Film Award	Best Actor	45 Years	Nominated	
2016	BAFTA TV Award	Best Supporting Actor	Unforgotten	Nominated	
2026	Berlin International Film Festival	Silver Bear for Best Supporting Performance	Queen at Sea	Won	
2026	Film Fest Gent	Joseph Plateau Honorary Award	Career	Won	

== See also ==
- List of Academy Award winners and nominees from Great Britain
- List of actors with Academy Award nominations
- List of actors with more than one Academy Award nomination in the acting categories
- List of British actors
- List of Golden Globe winners
