= Anna Calder-Marshall =

English actress (born 1947)

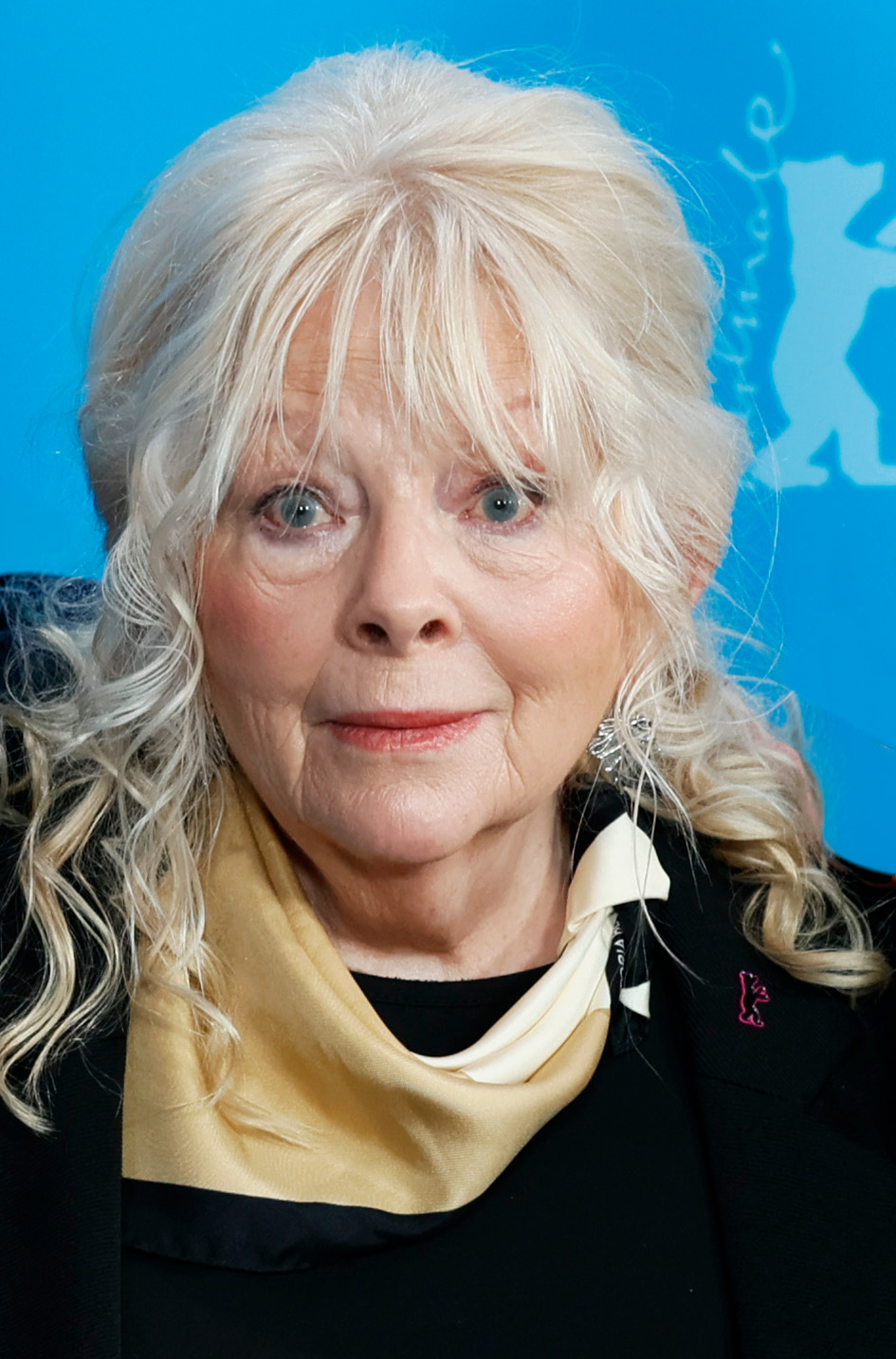
- Calder-Marshall in 2026
- Born: 11 January 1947 (age 79); Kensington, London, England
- Occupation: Actress
- Years active: 1967–present
- Spouse: David Burke (m. 1971; died 2026)
- Children: Tom Burke
- Father: Arthur Calder-Marshall

Anna Calder-Marshall (born 11 January 1947) is an English stage, film and television actress.

== Early life ==
Calder-Marshall was born in Kensington, London, and is the daughter of novelist and essayist Arthur Calder-Marshall and documentary screenplay-writer and his wife, Ara (née Violet Nancy Sales).

== Career ==
Calder-Marshall played Ophelia to Tom Courtenay's Hamlet in 1968, directed by Caspar Wrede and with John Nettles as Laertes, with the 69 Theatre Company in Manchester.

She appeared in the Inspector Morse episode "The Settling of the Sun" (1988) and the Midsomer Murders episode "Garden of Death" (2000). In 2005 Calder-Marshall played Maude Abernethie in the Agatha Christie's Poirot episode "After the Funeral".

Other roles include appearing in Harlots as Mrs. May, and in the 2018 BBC adaptation of Les Misérables as Madame Rully. Also in 2018, her real-life husband, actor David Burke, appeared as her character's husband in the short film Only the Lonely.

In 2022, she played Janice Beattie in the fifth series of Strike, acting opposite her son, actor Tom Burke who plays Strike.

In 2026, for her role in Queen at Sea, Calder-Marshall won the Silver Bear for Best Supporting Performance, shared with Tom Courtenay.

== Personal life ==
Her husband was actor David Burke from 1971 until his death in 2026. Their son, Tom, is also an actor.

== Filmography ==
=== Film ===
Year	Film	Role
1970	Pussycat, Pussycat, I Love You	Millie Dobbs
1970	Wuthering Heights	Catherine Earnshaw Linton
1979	Zulu Dawn	Fanny Colenso
1996	Saint-Ex	Moisy
1997	Anna Karenina	Princess Schcherbatksy
2010	Love & Distrust	Priscilla
2016	Trespass Against Us	Vic
2019	Us Among the Stones	Marianne
2019	Last Christmas	Dora
2023	Sweet Sue	Ethel
2026	Queen at Sea	Leslie

=== Television ===
Year	Title	Role	Notes
1967	The Wednesday Play	Clara Browning	Episode: “Message for Posterity”
1967	Love Story	Tania Langley	Episode: “Out of Sight, Out of Mind”
1967	Sanctuary	Anne Courtney	Episode: “Has Anyone Heard of Juliet?”
1969	Male of the Species	Mary McNeil	3 episodes
1984	Strangers and Brothers	Ellen Smith	1 episode
1983	King Lear	Cordelia	TV film
1985	Titus Andronicus	Lavinia	TV film
1992	Sherlock Holmes	Lady Helena / Agnes Northcote	Episode: “The Eligible Bachelor”
1993	Lovejoy	Virginia Moncrieff	Episode: “Poetic Licence”
2011	New Tricks	Helen Baxter	Episode: “Object of Desire”
2012	Thirteen Steps Down	Queenie	2 episodes
2013	Playhouse Presents	Susan	Episode: “Stage Door Johnnies”
2014	Scott & Bailey	Barbara Sweeting	Episode: “Tough Love”
2015	Casualty	Peggy Dowlands	Episode: “Clinging On”
2018–2019	Harlots	Mrs. May	5 episodes
2019	Les Misérables	Madame Rully	2 episodes
2020	The Third Day	Margaret	3 episodes
2021	Please Help	Nan	TV pilot
2022	Grantchester	Ida Merryman	Episode: #7.5
2022	This England	Charlotte Johnson Wahl	5 episodes
2022	Strike	Janice Beattie	2 episodes
2023	Bodies	Lady Harker	3 episodes
2026	Agatha Christie's Tommy & Tuppence	Mrs. Moody	Episode: #1.5
