= Luke Tittensor =

English actor (born 1989)

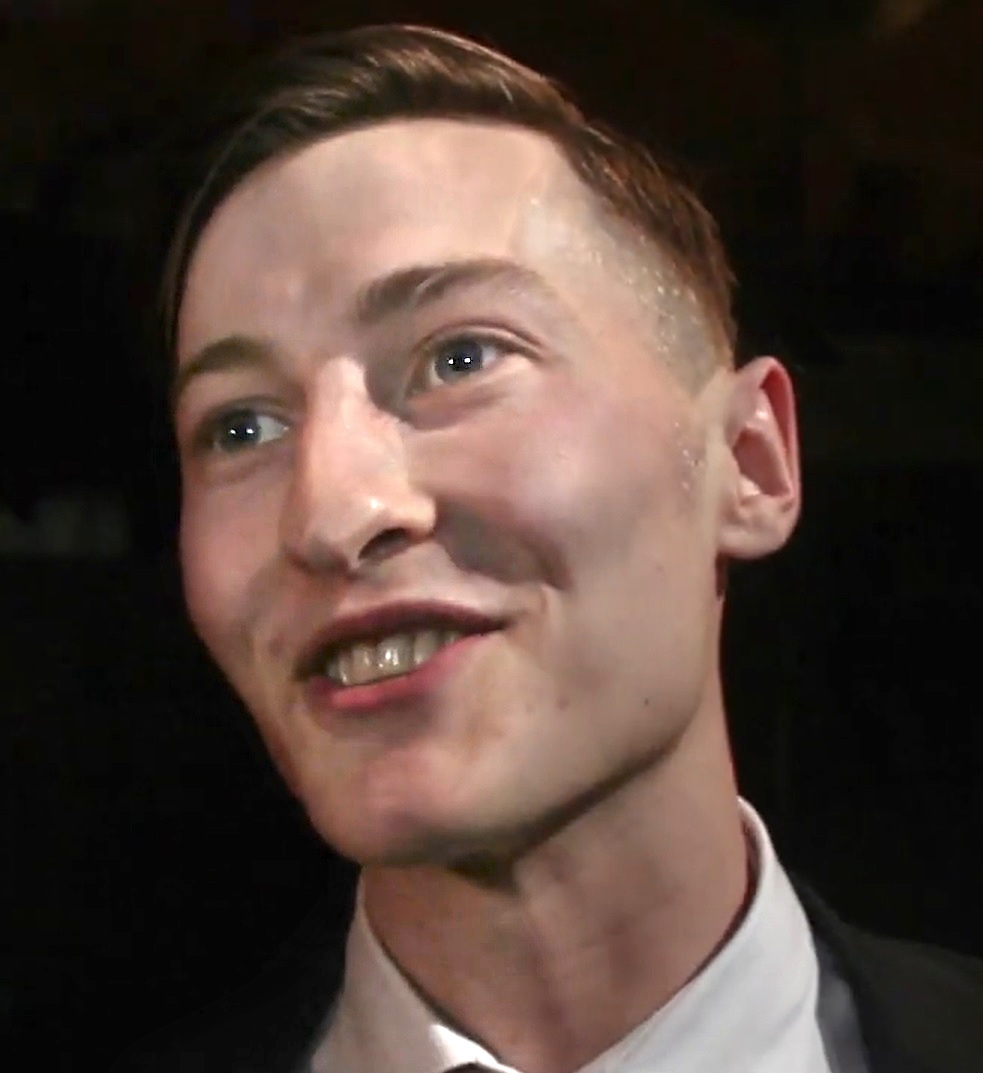
- Luke Tittensor at the Madame Bovary film premiere in 2014
- Born: Luke James Tittensor; 3 November 1989 (age 36); Heywood, Greater Manchester, England
- Occupation: Actor
- Years active: 2003–2016, 2022–present
- Relatives: Elliott Tittensor (twin brother) Ashley Tittensor (sister)

Luke James Tittensor (born 3 November 1989) is an English actor.

== Early life ==
Luke Tittensor is the identical twin brother of Elliott Tittensor. They are both from Heywood, Greater Manchester, and attended Heywood Community High School.

They also have an older sister, Ashley.

== Career ==
Luke Tittensor and his twin brother Elliott appeared in the soap Brookside.

In the first series of Channel 4 series Shameless, the Tittensor twins shared the role of Carl Gallagher. Elliott continued playing the role of Carl after Luke left the show.

Luke took the role of Daz Eden in Emmerdale from 2003 until April 2009, when his contract was terminated due to a criminal conviction. For his role as Daz, Tittensor was nominated for Best Young Actor at the 2007 Inside Soap Awards.

In 2010, Tittensor played gay pupil Connor Lewis in Waterloo Road.

Tittensor appeared in an episode of Casualty in January 2011. He then played the part of Nathan in the first episode of the BBC drama series The Body Farm in September 2011. In 2012, Tittensor played Liam in Holby City.

Tittensor appeared in Our World War as Paddy Kennedy in 2014. The same year, he played Hippolyte in the film Madame Bovary. In March 2014, he starred in an episode of Moving On.

In 2022, Tittensor secured the role of Ser Arryk Cargyll in HBO's House of the Dragon, alongside his twin brother, who plays the role of Ser Erryk Cargyll.

== Personal life ==
On 23 March 2009, Tittensor pleaded guilty to a charge of grievous bodily harm against an unnamed 16-year-old in Rochdale on 15 February 2008 that left the victim with a fractured jaw. His Emmerdale contract was terminated in April 2009 due to his conviction, with his last appearance in the show occurring the same month. On 29 April 2009, Tittensor received a nine-month suspended jail sentence for the assault. He was also ordered to complete 200 hours' unpaid work and pay £1,000 compensation to the victim.

== Filmography ==
=== Television ===
Year	Title	Role	Notes
2003	Brookside	Franny Gibson	2 episodes
2003–2009	Emmerdale	Daz Eden	322
2004	Shameless	Carl Gallagher	7
2010	Waterloo Road	Connor Lewis	2
2011	Casualty	Stan heyworth	1
2011	The Body Farm	Nathan	1
2012	Holby City	Liam McKee	5
2014	Our World War	Paddy Kennedy	1 pals
2014	Moving On	Stephen	
2022–2024	House of the Dragon	Ser Arryk Cargyll	8 episodes
