= Alice Dingle =

Fictional character from Emmerdale

- Emmerdale character
- Portrayed by: Ursula Holden-Gill
- Duration: 2004–2006
- First appearance: 5 December 2004
- Last appearance: 1 August 2006
- Introduced by: Steve Frost
In-universe information
- Occupation: Chicken farmer
- Father: John Wilson
- Husband: Sam Dingle (2006)
- Sons: Samson Dingle
- Granddaughters: Esther Spencer

Alice Dingle (also Wilson) is a fictional character from the British ITV soap opera Emmerdale, played by Ursula Holden-Gill. She made her first on-screen appearance during the episode broadcast on 5 December 2004.

== Storylines ==
The death of her father left Alice Wilson alone on the family farm, trying to make ends meet. When vet Paddy Kirk was called to see to her chickens, he and wife Emily were horrified by the way she was living and befriended her – soon she had temporarily moved in with them.

Through Emily, Alice became friends with Sam Dingle, who shared her love of chickens and was equally socially-excluded. Feelings between Alice and Sam ran deep and when she decided to sell her farm to relocate to Norfolk, he was in turmoil. In fact, he was so distraught at the prospect of losing Alice that he threatened to kill himself, leaving Eric Pollard to talk him out of it. However, what had been the worst day of his life, became the best when Alice returned from auctioning her property and they kissed. While she prepared to leave, Alice asked Sam to join her and live together as a couple. Horrified at the prospect of leaving Emmerdale and his beloved family, Sam refused and Alice prepared to go to Norfolk alone. But, realising this was his son's chance at happiness, Zak gave Sam some sage advice and then drove him to the station in time to catch the train with Alice. For months the couple lived happily on their chicken farm, keeping the Dingles updated on how they were.

One day, Sam returned to the Dingle home, acting strangely. A couple of weeks later, Alice appeared – explaining that Sam had upped and left after she fell pregnant. Although his family were shocked Sam could be so callous, Alice understood that he was just freaked out about the prospect of being a dad and soon the couple were back on track. However, Sam had missed home and wanted to remain in Emmerdale with their family around them to help with the baby. Things were fine, but Alice soon began feeling ill. Tests confirmed that she had cancer but, in an effort to protect Sam, she lied and said she'd been given the all clear. After a few weeks, Dr. Adam Forsythe forced her to come clean, devastating Sam. To make matters worse, Alice was advised to terminate her pregnancy so she could start chemotherapy immediately but Alice had no intention of getting rid of her baby. Against all advice, she refused the termination and gave birth to baby Samson prematurely in January 2006. The birth left Alice very depressed as Samson was rushed to intensive care before she got a chance to bond with him.

Sam did his best to keep the family together. Alice did a wing walk to raise money for charity. She shaved her head prior to starting chemotherapy so that she was in control of when she lost her hair. Alice's doctor told her the chemotherapy wasn't helping, so she stopped treatment. After several weeks of pain, in a dramatic euthanasia plot, Sam helped Alice die by giving her an overdose of morphine.

== Reception ==
For her portrayal of Alice, Holden-Gill received a nomination for Most Popular Actress at the 12th National Television Awards. She later earned a nomination for Best Actress at the 2007 British Soap Awards. A columnist from the Sunday Mercury opined that Alice met a "dignified and heart-breaking end" and said that she was brave for refusing cancer treatment for the sake of her child. They praised Holden-Gill for the effort she put into the storyline, including befriending cancer sufferers and shaving her own head.
