= Ursula Holden-Gill =

English actress (born 1974)

- Other name: Ursula Marsden
- Education: St Martin's College; Lancaster University; Drama Studio London
- Occupations: Actress; Dramatherapist
- Known for: Teachers; Emmerdale; Wolfblood

Ursula Holden-Gill (born 2 January 1974) is an English actress and dramatherapist, best known for her roles as school secretary Carol on Channel 4's comedy drama Teachers (2001–2004), Alice Dingle on ITV's soap opera Emmerdale (2004–2006) and Miss Fitzgerald on CBBC's Wolfblood (2012–2014).

== Career ==
Holden-Gill graduated from St Martin's College, Lancaster in 1996 with a BA Honours in Drama and Music, before attaining an MA in Intercultural Storytelling at University of Lancaster and a PG Dip in Acting from the Drama Studio London. Alongside Holden-Gill's theatre and radio credits, her screen credits include The Bill, Sex, Chips & Rock n' Roll, Mrs Merton and Malcolm, Trial & Retribution, Doctor Willoughby, The Wyvern Mystery, People Like Us, Teachers, Emmerdale, The Syndicate, Vera, In the Dark and Wolfblood.

In 2007, Holden-Gill underwent teacher training at Unity College, Burnley, where she attained full qualified Teacher status and went on to establish herself as a professional Storyteller. More recently, Holden-Gill graduated from Derby University with an MA in Dramatherapy. She lives in West Yorkshire and now works exclusively as a Dramatherapist.

== Awards and nominations ==
- Nominated – National Television Awards 2006 – Most Popular Actress For Emmerdale (Shortlisted)
- Nominated – British Soap Awards 2006 – Best Dramatic Performance For Emmerdale (Shortlisted)
- Won – TV Quick Awards 2006 – Best Soap Actress For Emmerdale
- Won – Best Newcomer at the British Awards for Storytelling Excellence in 2012
