= The British Soap Awards =

British TV awards, founded 1999

- Awarded for: Best in British soap opera
- Location: London and Manchester
- Country: United Kingdom
- Presented by: Richard Madeley (1999–2001); Judy Finnigan (1999–2001); Matthew Kelly (2002); Des O'Connor (2003); Melanie Sykes (2003); Paul O'Grady (2004–2005); Fern Britton (2006–2008); Phillip Schofield (2006–2019, 2022); Jane McDonald (2023–2025)
- First award: 1999; 27 years ago
- Final award: 2025; 1 year ago
- Website: www.britishsoapawards.tv

The British Soap Awards (BSAs) were an annual awards ceremony which honoured the contributions made by the cast and crew of various British soap operas. The trophies given to the winners are made from metal and glass and were manufactured by British firm Creative Awards since their inception. The majority of the awards were voted for by a panel of industry professionals, while certain awards including Best British Soap and Best Leading Performer were voted for by the general public. The ceremony alternated between locations in London and Manchester and was televised on ITV1.

== History ==
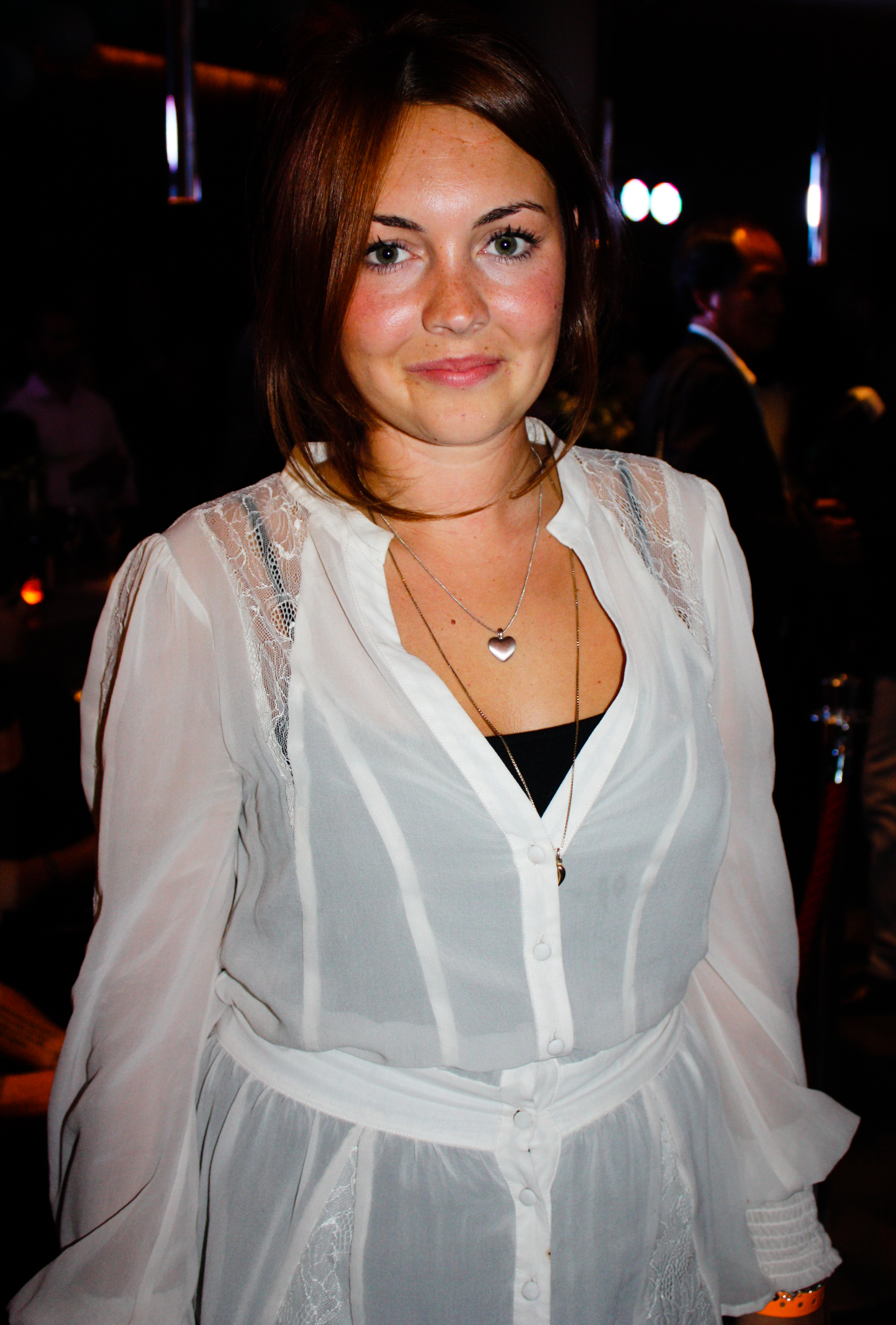
Lacey Turner, who portrayed Stacey Slater in the BBC soap opera EastEnders, holds the record for most individual soap awards, with eight wins.

The first British Soap Awards was held in 1999, and was presented by Richard Madeley and Judy Finnigan, who presented the awards until 2001. Matthew Kelly presented the 2002 awards, before being replaced by Des O'Connor and Melanie Sykes in 2003. Paul O'Grady presented the awards between 2004 and 2005. Phillip Schofield and Fern Britton became the presenters in 2006. Britton left in 2008, however Schofield continued to present the awards as a solo presenter until the 2022, as in May 2023, after presenting the ceremonies for 16 years, Schofield announced that he had resigned. On 1 June 2023, it was announced that Jane McDonald would replace Schofield as the new host of the awards.

Although it is an ITV Studios production, the events were held at the BBC Television Centre in London until 2009. The ceremonies were then held at various locations in London and Manchester, including the Granada Studios, the London Studios, dock10, the Hackney Empire, the Palace Theatre and the Lowry. The soap operas that regularly received nominations for awards were Brookside, Coronation Street, Crossroads, Doctors, EastEnders, Emmerdale, Family Affairs, Hollyoaks and Night and Day.

In 2016, it was announced that the award for outstanding achievements made off-screen would be known as the Tony Warren Award following the death of Tony Warren, the creator of Coronation Street. On 1 May 2018, ITV announced that for the 20th anniversary of the show, it would be broadcast live for the first time on 2 June 2018. In March 2020, it was announced that the 2020 ceremony had been cancelled due to the COVID-19 pandemic. ITV instead aired a 60-minute special in its place titled The British Soap Awards Celebrates 21 Years, narrated by Schofield. In April 2021, it was announced that the 2021 ceremony had also been cancelled, once again due to the pandemic.

In April 2022, it was confirmed that the British Soap Awards would be held in June 2022. They also announced the introduction of two new viewer-voted categories, Best Family and Best Leading Performer. With the introduction of the gender-neutral Best Leading Performer category, it was confirmed that the awards for Best Actress and Best Actor were discontinued. Then in 2023, they reintroduced Villain of the Year as a viewer-voted category, as well as making the Best Young Performer award viewer-voted for the first time.

On 1 November 2023, the 2024 British Soap Awards were cancelled for an undisclosed reason by ITV. However, it was confirmed that they would return in 2025. The 2025 ceremony what would be the last ever BSA ceremony was held as planned, but a year later, it was confirmed that the 2026 ceremony would be cancelled completely. In June 2026, it was announced that ITV had cancelled the British Soap Awards altogether for four times overall as part of budget cuts for the network.

== Categories ==
- Best Actor
- Best Actress
- Best Bitch
- Best British Soap
- Best Comedy Performance
- Best Dramatic Performance
- Best Exit
- Best Family
- Best Female Dramatic Performance
- Best Foreign Soap
- Best Leading Performer
- Best Male Dramatic Performance
- Best Newcomer
- Best On-Screen Partnership
- Best Single Episode
- Best Storyline
- Best Young Performer
- Greatest Moment
- Hero of the Year
- Scene of the Year
- Sexiest Female
- Sexiest Male
- Villain of the Year
- Outstanding Achievement Award
- Tony Warren Award

== Ceremonies ==
Year	Presenters		Location
1999	Richard Madeley	Judy Finnigan	Television Centre, London
2000	Richard Madeley	Judy Finnigan	Television Centre, London
2001	Richard Madeley	Judy Finnigan	Television Centre, London
2002	Matthew Kelly	—N/a	Television Centre, London
2003	Des O'Connor	Melanie Sykes	Television Centre, London
2004	Paul O'Grady	—N/a	Television Centre, London
2005	Paul O'Grady	—N/a	Television Centre, London
2006	Phillip Schofield	Fern Britton	Television Centre, London
2007	Phillip Schofield	Fern Britton	Television Centre, London
2008	Phillip Schofield	Fern Britton	Television Centre, London
2009	Phillip Schofield	—N/a	Television Centre, London
2010	Phillip Schofield	—N/a	The London Studios, London
2011	Phillip Schofield	—N/a	Granada Studios, Manchester
2012	Phillip Schofield	—N/a	The London Studios, London
2013	Phillip Schofield	—N/a	dock10, Greater Manchester
2014	Phillip Schofield	—N/a	Hackney Empire, London
2015	Phillip Schofield	—N/a	Palace Theatre, Manchester
2016	Phillip Schofield	—N/a	Hackney Empire, London
2017	Phillip Schofield	—N/a	The Lowry, Salford
2018	Phillip Schofield	—N/a	Hackney Empire, London
2019	Phillip Schofield	—N/a	The Lowry, Salford
2020–2021	Ceremonies cancelled due to the COVID-19 pandemic		
2022	Phillip Schofield	—N/a	Hackney Empire, London
2023	Jane McDonald	—N/a	The Lowry, Salford
2024	Ceremony cancelled		
2025	Jane McDonald	—N/a	Hackney Empire, London
2026–Present	Ceremonies completely cancelled		

== Winners ==
=== 1990s ===
==== 1999 ====
Award	Winners	Nominees
"Best British Soap"	Coronation Street	Brookside; EastEnders; Emmerdale; Family Affairs; Hollyoaks
"Best Actor"	Ross Kemp (Grant Mitchell in EastEnders)	Dean Sullivan (Jimmy Corkhill in Brookside); David Neilson (Roy Cropper in Coronation Street); Kelvin Fletcher (Andy Sugden in Emmerdale)
"Best Actress"	Barbara Windsor (Peggy Mitchell in EastEnders)	Julie Hesmondhalgh (Hayley Patterson in Coronation Street); Patsy Palmer (Bianca Jackson in EastEnders); Lisa Riley (Mandy Dingle in Emmerdale)
"Sexiest Male"	Michael Greco (Beppe di Marco in EastEnders)	Adam Rickitt (Nick Tilsley in Coronation Street); Ross Kemp (Grant Mitchell in EastEnders); Stuart Wade (Biff Fowler in Emmerdale)
"Sexiest Female"	Tamzin Outhwaite (Mel Healy in EastEnders)	Tracy Shaw (Maxine Peacock in Coronation Street); Denise Welch (Natalie Barnes in Coronation Street); Claire King (Kim Tate in Emmerdale)
"Best Exit"	Claire King (Kim Tate in Emmerdale)	Philip Middlemiss (Des Barnes in Coronation Street); Martine McCutcheon (Tiffany Mitchell in EastEnders)
"Best Comedy Performance"	John Savident (Fred Elliott in Coronation Street)	Gladys Ambrose (Julia Brogan in Brookside); David Neilson (Roy Cropper in Coronation Street); June Brown (Dot Cotton in EastEnders)
"Best Dramatic Performance"	Kelvin Fletcher (Andy Sugden in Emmerdale)	Georgia Taylor (Toyah Battersby in Coronation Street); Barbara Windsor (Peggy Mitchell in EastEnders); Kerrie Taylor (Lucy Benson in Hollyoaks)
"Best On-Screen Partnership"	David Neilson and Julie Hesmondhalgh (Roy Cropper and Hayley Patterson in Coronation Street)	Dean Sullivan and Sue Jenkins (Jimmy and Jackie Corkhill in Brookside); Bill Tarmey and Liz Dawn (Jack and Vera Duckworth in Coronation Street); Dominic Brunt and Lisa Riley (Paddy Kirk and Mandy Dingle in Emmerdale)
"Villain of the Year"	Stephen Billington (Greg Kelly in Coronation Street)	Martin Kemp (Steve Owen in EastEnders); Ross Kemp (Grant Mitchell in EastEnders); Claire King (Kim Tate in Emmerdale)
"Best Storyline"	Tiffany discovering her mother Louise's affair with Grant (EastEnders)	Sinbad and the gas explosion on the parade (Brookside); Roy and Hayley's courtship leading to their marriage (Coronation Street); Mandy's triumph over her sexually abusive father (Hollyoaks)
"Best Foreign Soap"	Home and Away	The Bold and the Beautiful; Neighbours; Sunset Beach
"Special Achievement Award" presented by Melvyn Bragg	William Roache (Ken Barlow in Coronation Street)	N/A

=== 2000s ===
==== 2000 ====
Award	Winners
"Best British Soap"	EastEnders
"Best Actor"	Joe Absolom (Matthew Rose in EastEnders)
"Best Actress"	Patsy Palmer (Bianca Butcher in EastEnders)
"Sexiest Male"	Michael Greco (Beppe di Marco in EastEnders)
"Sexiest Female"	Tamzin Outhwaite (Mel Healy in EastEnders)
"Best Newcomer"	Gary Lucy (Luke Morgan in Hollyoaks)
"Best Exit"	Paul Loughran (Butch Dingle in Emmerdale)
"Best Comedy Performance"	Sue Nicholls (Audrey Roberts in Coronation Street)
"Best On-Screen Partnership"	Dean Sullivan and Sue Jenkins (Jimmy and Jackie Corkhill in Brookside)
"Best Dramatic Performance"	Lindsey Coulson (Carol Jackson in EastEnders)
"Villain of the Year"	Martin Kemp (Steve Owen in EastEnders)
"Best Storyline"	The teenage pregnancy of Sarah-Louise Platt (Coronation Street)
"Best Foreign Soap"	Home and Away
"Spectacular Scene of the Year"	"Millennium Club Explosion" (Brookside)
Special Achievement Award	Tony Warren

==== 2001 ====
Award	Winners
"Best British Soap"	EastEnders
"Best Actor"	Martin Kemp (Steve Owen in EastEnders)
"Best Actress"	Natalie Cassidy (Sonia Jackson in EastEnders)
"Sexiest Male"	Martin Kemp (Steve Owen in EastEnders)
"Sexiest Female"	Tamzin Outhwaite (Mel Healy in EastEnders)
"Best Newcomer"	Jessie Wallace (Kat Slater in EastEnders)
"Best Exit"	Naomi Radcliffe (Alison Webster in Coronation Street)
"Best Comedy Performance"	Sarah White (Bev McLoughlin in Brookside)
"Best On-Screen Partnership"	Bill Tarmey and Liz Dawn (Jack and Vera Duckworth in Coronation Street)
"Best Dramatic Performance"	Georgia Taylor (Toyah Battersby in Coronation Street)
"Hero of the Year"	Clive Hornby (Jack Sugden in Emmerdale)
"Villain of the Year"	Steve McFadden (Phil Mitchell in EastEnders)
"Spectacular Scene of the Year"	Andy burning the barn (Emmerdale)
"Best Storyline"	Mark, Linda and Mike love triangle (Coronation Street)
"Best Single Episode"	The Live Episode (8 December 2000, Coronation Street)
"Special Achievement Award"	Phil Redmond (Creator of Brookside and Hollyoaks)

==== 2002 ====
Award	Winners
"Best British Soap"	EastEnders
"Best Actor"	Martin Kemp (Steve Owen in EastEnders)
"Best Actress"	Kacey Ainsworth (Little Mo Morgan in EastEnders)
"Sexiest Male"	Martin Kemp (Steve Owen in EastEnders)
"Sexiest Female"	Jessie Wallace (Kat Slater in EastEnders)
"Best Newcomer"	Alex Ferns (Trevor Morgan in Eastenders)
"Best Exit"	Batley the dog (Emmerdale)
"Best Comedy Performance"	Malcolm Hebden (Norris Cole in Coronation Street)
"Best On-Screen Partnership"	John Bardon and June Brown (Jim and Dot Branning in EastEnders)
"Best Dramatic Performance"	Raymond Quinn (Anthony Murray in Brookside)
"Best Storyline"	Bullying Plot (Brookside)
"Hero of the Year"	Stuart Manning (Sam Armstrong in Night and Day)
"Villain of the Year"	Alex Ferns (Trevor Morgan in EastEnders)
"Spectacular Scene of the Year"	Adam and Mandy's car crash (Hollyoaks)
"Best Single Episode"	Zoe discovers that Kat is her mother (EastEnders)
"Special Achievement Award"	Tony Holland (Co-creator of EastEnders)

==== 2003 ====
Award	Winners
"Best British Soap" presented by Paul O'Grady	Coronation Street
"Best Actor"	Brian Capron (Richard Hillman in Coronation Street)
"Best Actress"	Kacey Ainsworth (Little Mo Mitchell in EastEnders)
"Sexiest Male"	Shane Richie (Alfie Moon in EastEnders)
"Sexiest Female"	Jessie Wallace (Kat Moon in EastEnders)
"Best Newcomer"	Jack McMullen (Josh McLoughlin in Brookside)
"Best Exit"	Brian Capron (Richard Hillman in Coronation Street)
"Best Comedy Performance"	Andrew Whyment (Kirk Sutherland in Coronation Street)
"Best On-Screen Partnership"	Jack McMullen and Sarah White (Josh and Bev McLoughlin in Brookside)
"Best Dramatic Performance"	Sue Nicholls (Audrey Roberts in Coronation Street)
"Hero of the Year"	Sue Nicholls (Audrey Roberts in Coronation Street)
"Villain of the Year"	Brian Capron (Richard Hillman in Coronation Street)
"Spectacular Scene of the Year"	Richard Hillman's confessions of murder (Coronation Street)
"Best Storyline"	Richard Hillman's homicidal story arc (Coronation Street)
"Best Single Episode"	Marlon and Tricia's wedding plans (Emmerdale)
"Lifetime Achievement Award" presented by Sue Johnston	Dean Sullivan (Jimmy Corkhill in Brookside)

==== 2004 ====
Award	Winners	Nominees
"Best British Soap" presented by Larry Hagman	EastEnders	Brookside; Coronation Street; Doctors; Emmerdale; Family Affairs; Hollyoaks
"Best Actor"	Shane Richie (Alfie Moon in EastEnders)	Mark Charnock (Marlon Dingle in Emmerdale); Simon Gregson (Steve McDonald in Coronation Street); David Neilson (Roy Cropper in Coronation Street) (Note: These were the top four nominees as voted for by the public, from a longlist of 18 that consisted of three nominees from each soap.)
"Best Actress"	Suranne Jones (Karen McDonald in Coronation Street)	Kacey Ainsworth (Little Mo Mitchell in EastEnders); Kate Ford (Tracy Barlow in Coronation Street); Jessie Wallace (Kat Moon in EastEnders)
"Sexiest Male"	Nigel Harman (Dennis Rickman in EastEnders)	
"Sexiest Female"	Jessie Wallace (Kat Moon in EastEnders)	Suranne Jones (Karen McDonald in Coronation Street); Michelle Ryan (Zoe Slater in EastEnders); Sammy Winward (Katie Sugden in Emmerdale)
"Best Newcomer"	Nigel Harman (Dennis Rickman in EastEnders)	Gareth Hale (Doug MacKenzie in Family Affairs); Wendi Peters (Cilla Brown in Coronation Street); Luke Tittensor (Daz Eden in Emmerdale)
"Best Exit"	Sheree Murphy (Tricia Dingle in Emmerdale)	Henry Luxemburg (Toby Mills in Hollyoaks); Miles Petit (Roy Farmer in Family Affairs); Shaun Williamson (Barry Evans in EastEnders)
"Best Comedy Performance"	Alex Carter (Lee Hunter in Hollyoaks)	Tony Audenshaw (Bob Hope in Emmerdale; Shane Richie (Alfie Moon in EastEnders); Ebony Thomas (Yasmin MacKenzie in Family Affairs)
"Best On-Screen Partnership"	David Neilson and Julie Hesmondhalgh (Roy and Hayley Cropper in Coronation Street)	Simon Gregson and Suranne Jones (Steve and Karen McDonald in Coronation Street); Shane Richie and Jessie Wallace (Alfie and Kat Moon in EastEnders); Gareth Hale and Nicola Duffett (Doug MacKenzie and Cat Webb in Family Affairs)
"Best Dramatic Performance"	Mark Charnock (Marlon Dingle in Emmerdale)	Letitia Dean (Sharon Watts in EastEnders); David Neilson (Roy Cropper in Coronation Street); Kazia Pelka (Chrissy Costello in Family Affairs)
"Best Dramatic Performance from a Young Actor or Actress"	Natalie Cassidy (Sonia Jackson in EastEnders)	Sam Aston (Chesney Brown in Coronation Street); Gemma Atkinson (Lisa Hunter in Hollyoaks); Luke Tittensor (Daz Eden in Emmerdale)
"Best Bitch"	Kate Ford (Tracy Barlow in Coronation Street)	Charlie Brooks (Janine Butcher in EastEnders); Tiffany Mulheron (Natalie Osborne in Hollyoaks); Wendi Peters (Cilla Brown in Coronation Street)
"Villain of the Year"	Charlie Brooks (Janine Butcher in EastEnders)	Peter Amory (Chris Tate in Emmerdale); Kate Ford (Tracy Barlow in Coronation Street); Henry Luxemburg (Toby Mills in Hollyoaks) (Note: These were the top four nominees as voted for by the public, from a longlist of 15 that consisted of three nominees from each soap, excluding Doctors, which had one nominee, and Hollyoaks, which had two nominees.)
"Spectacular Scene of the Year"	The Storm (Emmerdale)	The Quarry Car Crash (Doctors); Cyber Café Fire (Family Affairs); Leap of Faith (Hollyoaks)
"Best Storyline"	Tracy tricks Roy and tries to ruin Karen and Steve's wedding (Coronation Street)	Peter's bigamy (Coronation Street); Chrissy cons her family into believing her daughter is ill (Family Affairs); The Serial Killer (Hollyoaks)
"Best Single Episode"	"Say a Little Prayer" (Doctors)	The Final Episode (Brookside); Karen and Steve's wedding (Coronation Street); Dirty Den's return (EastEnders); The Storm (Emmerdale)
"Special Achievement Award"	Mal Young (Creator of Family Affairs and ex-executive producer of EastEnders)	N/A
"Lifetime Achievement Award" presented by Roy Barraclough	Barbara Knox (Rita Sullivan in Coronation Street)	N/A

==== 2005 ====
Stan Richards, who played Seth Armstrong in Emmerdale, was remembered during the ceremony, having died in February 2005.

Award	Winners	Nominees
"Best British Soap"	Coronation Street	Doctors; EastEnders; Emmerdale; Family Affairs; Hollyoaks
"Best Actor"	Shane Richie (Alfie Moon in EastEnders)	Antony Cotton (Sean Tully in Coronation Street); Simon Gregson (Steve McDonald in Coronation Street); Nigel Harman (Dennis Rickman in EastEnders)
"Best Actress"	Suranne Jones (Karen McDonald in Coronation Street)	Kacey Ainsworth (Little Mo Mitchell in EastEnders); Emma Atkins (Charity Tate in Emmerdale); Jessie Wallace (Kat Moon in EastEnders)
"Sexiest Male"	Nigel Harman (Dennis Rickman in EastEnders)	
"Sexiest Female"	Jodi Albert (Debbie Dean in Hollyoaks)	
"Best Newcomer"	Andrea Green (Sarah Finch in Doctors)	Antony Cotton (Sean Tully in Coronation Street); Charlie Hardwick (Val Lambert in Emmerdale); Tracy-Ann Oberman (Chrissie Watts in EastEnders)
"Best Exit"	Charlie Brooks (Janine Butcher in EastEnders)	Emma Atkins (Charity Tate in Emmerdale); Sam Barriscale (Sam Steel in Family Affairs); Sasha Behar (Maya Sharma in Coronation Street)
"Best Comedy Performance"	Maggie Jones (Blanche Hunt in Coronation Street)	Deena Payne (Viv Hope in Emmerdale); Carley Stenson (Steph Dean in Hollyoaks); Ebony Thomas (Yasmin Green in Family Affairs)
"Best On-Screen Partnership"	John Bardon and June Brown (Jim and Dot Branning in EastEnders)	Sam Aston and Schmeichel (Chesney Battersby-Brown and Schmeichel the Dog in Coronation Street); Elizabeth Estensen and Charlie Hardwick (Diane Sugden and Val Lambert in Emmerdale); Alex Carter and Lee Otway (Lee Hunter and David "Bombhead" Burke in Hollyoaks)
"Best Dramatic Performance"	Kazia Pelka (Chrissy Costello in Family Affairs)	Gary Beadle (Paul Trueman in EastEnders); David Neilson (Roy Cropper in Coronation Street); Lee Otway (David "Bombhead" Burke in Hollyoaks)
"Best Dramatic Performance from a Young Actor or Actress"	Sam Aston (Chesney Battersby-Brown in Coronation Street)	Chris Fountain (Justin Burton in Hollyoaks); Lacey Turner (Stacey Slater in EastEnders); Charley Webb (Debbie Dingle in Emmerdale)
"Best Bitch"	Kate Ford (Tracy Barlow in Coronation Street)	Gabrielle Glaister (Trish Wallace in Family Affairs); Patsy Kensit (Sadie King in Emmerdale); Lacey Turner (Stacey Slater in EastEnders)
"Villain of the Year"; Presented by Alice Cooper	Sasha Behar (Maya Sharma in Coronation Street)	Lorraine Chase (Steph Stokes in Emmerdale); Tracy-Ann Oberman (Chrissie Watts in EastEnders); Bill Ward (Charlie Stubbs in Coronation Street)
"Spectacular Scene of the Year"	Maya takes Dev and Sunita hostage and blows up the shop (Coronation Street)	Les and Cilla's whirlpool disaster (Coronation Street); Tom's firework party (Hollyoaks); The Open-Top Bus (Hollyoaks)
"Best Storyline"	Gary and Chrissy learn friend Bradley has been abusing their daughter Chloe (Family Affairs)	Maya's revenge on Dev and Sunita (Coronation Street); Diane's struggle with cancer (Emmerdale); Bombhead's grief over his mother (Hollyoaks)
"Best Single Episode"	Charity and Tom's wedding (Emmerdale)	Maya blows up Dev's shops (Coronation Street); Past Imperfect (Doctors); Christmas Day (EastEnders)
"Special Achievement Award"	John Stevenson (Coronation Street writer)	N/A
"Lifetime Achievement Award"; Presented by Barbara Windsor	June Brown (Dot Branning in EastEnders)	N/A

==== 2006 ====
Award	Winners	Nominees
"Best British Soap"	EastEnders	Coronation Street; Doctors; Emmerdale; Hollyoaks
"Best Actor"	Ross Kemp (Grant Mitchell in EastEnders)	Antony Cotton (Sean Tully in Coronation Street); Shane Richie (Alfie Moon in EastEnders); Bradley Walsh (Danny Baldwin in Coronation Street)
"Best Actress"	Lacey Turner (Stacey Slater in EastEnders)	Sue Cleaver (Eileen Grimshaw in Coronation Street; Kate Ford (Tracy Barlow in Coronation Street); Jessie Wallace (Kat Moon in EastEnders)
"Sexiest Male"	Richard Fleeshman (Craig Harris in Coronation Street)	
"Sexiest Female"	Louisa Lytton (Ruby Allen in EastEnders)	
"Best Newcomer"	Charlie Clements (Bradley Branning in EastEnders)	Daniel Anthony (Lex Keavey in Doctors); Jenna-Louise Coleman (Jasmine Thomas in Emmerdale); Jessica Fox (Nancy Hayton in Hollyoaks)
"Best Exit"	Leah Bracknell (Zoe Tate in Emmerdale)	Warren Brown (Andy Holt in Hollyoaks); Robert Cavanah (Dr. Peter Kendrick in Doctors); Shane Richie and Jessie Wallace (Alfie and Kat Moon in EastEnders)
"Best Comedy Performance"	Charlie Hardwick (Val Lambert in Emmerdale)	Ricky Groves (Garry Hobbs in EastEnders; Malcolm Hebden (Norris Cole in Coronation Street); Carley Stenson (Steph Dean in Hollyoaks)
"Best On-Screen Partnership"	Malcolm Hebden and Barbara Knox (Norris Cole and Rita Sullivan in Coronation Street)	Tony Audenshaw and Deena Payne (Bob and Viv Hope in Emmerdale); Bill Ward and Kate Ford (Charlie Stubbs and Tracy Barlow in Coronation Street); Matt Littler and Darren Jeffries (Max Cunningham and Sam "O.B." O'Brien in Hollyoaks)
"Best Dramatic Performance"	Bradley Walsh (Danny Baldwin in Coronation Street)	Stirling Gallacher (George Woodson in Doctors); Ursula Holden-Gill (Alice Dingle in Emmerdale); Lacey Turner (Stacey Slater in EastEnders)
"Best Dramatic Performance from a Young Actor or Actress"	Ellis Hollins (Tom Cunningham in Hollyoaks)	Helen Flanagan (Rosie Webster in Coronation Street; Richard Fleeshman (Craig Harris in Coronation Street); Luke Tittensor (Daz Eden in Emmerdale)
"Best Bitch"	Nicola Wheeler (Nicola Blackstock in Emmerdale)	Kate Ford (Tracy Barlow in Coronation Street); Patsy Kensit (Sadie King in Emmerdale); Tracy-Ann Oberman (Chrissie Watts in EastEnders)
"Villain of the Year"	Billy Murray (Johnny Allen in EastEnders)	Warren Brown (Andy Holt in Hollyoaks); Kate Ford (Tracy Barlow in Coronation Street); Bill Ward (Charlie Stubbs in Coronation Street)
"Spectacular Scene of the Year"	Belle and Daz trapped in a mine shaft (Emmerdale)	Phil's close shave (EastEnders); Home Farm explodes (Emmerdale); Russ, Sam and Andy's cliffhanger (Hollyoaks)
"Best Storyline"	Justin and Becca's affair (Hollyoaks)	Mike's Alzheimer's and Danny's empire-building (Coronation Street); Dr. Kendrick's suicide (Doctors); The Mitchells' return (EastEnders)
"Best Single Episode"	Armistice Day episode (EastEnders)	Shelley's wedding (Coronation Street); The Anatomy of Marriage (Doctors); Zoe's exit (Emmerdale)
"Special Achievement Award"	Tony Prescott (Coronation Street and Emmerdale director)	N/A
"Lifetime Achievement Award"; Presented by Bradley Walsh	Johnny Briggs (Mike Baldwin in Coronation Street)	N/A

==== 2007 ====
Award	Winners	Nominees
"Best British Soap"; Presented by Shirley Bassey	Coronation Street	Doctors; EastEnders; Emmerdale; Hollyoaks
"Best Actor"; Presented by Felicity Kendal	Antony Cotton (Sean Tully in Coronation Street)	Chris Fountain (Justin Burton in Hollyoaks); James Sutton (John Paul McQueen in Hollyoaks); Bill Ward (Charlie Stubbs in Coronation Street) (Note: These were the top four nominees as voted for by the public, from a longlist of 15 that consisted of three nominees from each soap.)
"Best Actress"	Kate Ford (Tracy Barlow in Coronation Street)	Jessica Fox (Nancy Hayton in Hollyoaks); Ursula Holden-Gill (Alice Dingle in Emmerdale); Lacey Turner (Stacey Slater in EastEnders)
"Sexiest Male"	Rob James-Collier (Liam Connor in Coronation Street)	Chris Fountain (Justin Burton in Hollyoaks); Robert Kazinsky (Sean Slater in EastEnders); Ricky Whittle (Calvin Valentine in Hollyoaks)
"Sexiest Female"	Roxanne McKee (Louise Summers in Hollyoaks)	Gemma Merna (Carmel McQueen in Hollyoaks); Samia Smith (Maria Sutherland in Coronation Street); Lacey Turner (Stacey Slater in EastEnders)
"Best Newcomer"	Kym Marsh (Michelle Connor in Coronation Street)	Joseph Gilgun (Eli Dingle in Emmerdale); Martha Howe-Douglas (Donna Parmar in Doctors); Gerard McCarthy (Kris Fisher in Hollyoaks)
"Best Exit"	Bill Ward (Charlie Stubbs in Coronation Street)	Lorraine Chase (Steph Forsythe in Emmerdale); Sarah Jayne Dunn (Mandy Hutchinson in Hollyoaks); Jeff Hordley (Cain Dingle in Emmerdale)
"Best Comedy Performance"	Gemma Merna (Carmel McQueen in Hollyoaks)	Ricky Groves (Garry Hobbs in EastEnders); Charlie Hardwick (Val Lambert in Emmerdale); Martha Howe-Douglas (Donna Parmar in Doctors)
"Best On-Screen Partnership"	Seán Gleeson and Stirling Gallacher (Ronnie and George Woodson in Doctors)	Ryan Thomas and Sue Cleaver (Jason and Eileen Grimshaw in Coronation Street); Bill Ward and Kate Ford (Charlie Stubbs and Tracy Barlow in Coronation Street); Matt Littler and Darren Jeffries (Max Cunningham and Sam "O.B." O'Brien in Hollyoaks)
"Best Dramatic Performance"	Lacey Turner (Stacey Slater in EastEnders)	Kate Ford (Tracy Barlow in Coronation Street); James Sutton (John Paul McQueen in Hollyoaks); Bill Ward (Charlie Stubbs in Coronation Street)
"Best Dramatic Performance from a Young Actor or Actress"	Eden Taylor-Draper (Belle Dingle in Emmerdale)	Sam Aston (Chesney Battersby-Brown in Coronation Street); Charlie G. Hawkins (Darren Miller in EastEnders); Ellis Hollins (Tom Cunningham in Hollyoaks)
"Villain of the Year"	Gemma Bissix (Clare Devine in Hollyoaks)	Kate Ford (Tracy Barlow in Coronation Street); Jamie Lomas (Warren Fox in Hollyoaks); Sophie Thompson (Stella Crawford in EastEnders) (Note: These were the top four nominees as voted for by the public, from a longlist of 12 that consisted of three nominees from EastEnders and Emmerdale and two nominees from Coronation Street, Doctors and Hollyoaks.)
"Spectacular Scene of the Year"	King's River explosion (Emmerdale)	Billy and Victoria's truck crash into the lake (Emmerdale); The fire at The Dog in the Pond (Hollyoaks); O.B. punches Clare and saves Max from the lake (Hollyoaks)
"Best Storyline"	Charlie's cheating and Tracy's revenge (Coronation Street)	Billy and Honey's Down's syndrome baby (EastEnders); Who Killed Tom King? (Emmerdale); Clare attempts to kill Max (Hollyoaks)
"Best Single Episode"	"Shreds and Aftermath" (Doctors)	Tracy's confession to Deirdre (Coronation Street); Cain and Sadie's exit (Emmerdale); The fire at The Dog in the Pond (Hollyoaks)
"Special Achievement Award"	Tony Jordan (EastEnders writer)	N/A
"Lifetime Achievement Award"; Presented by Todd Carty	Wendy Richard (Pauline Fowler in EastEnders)	N/A

==== 2008 ====
Mike Reid, who played Frank Butcher in EastEnders, was remembered during the ceremony, having died in July 2007.

Award	Winners	Nominees
"Best British Soap"	EastEnders	Coronation Street; Doctors; Emmerdale; Hollyoaks
"Best Actor"	Chris Fountain (Justin Burton in Hollyoaks)	Charlie Clements (Bradley Branning in EastEnders; Jack P. Shepherd (David Platt in Coronation Street); James Sutton (John Paul McQueen in Hollyoaks)
"Best Actress"	Emma Rigby (Hannah Ashworth in Hollyoaks)	Jo Joyner (Tanya Branning in EastEnders); Lacey Turner (Stacey Branning in EastEnders); Charlotte Bellamy (Laurel Thomas in Emmerdale)
"Sexiest Male"	Rob James-Collier (Liam Connor in Coronation Street)	Ricky Whittle (Calvin Valentine in Hollyoaks); Robert Kazinsky (Sean Slater in EastEnders); Scott Maslen (Jack Branning in EastEnders)
"Sexiest Female"	Roxanne McKee (Louise Summers in Hollyoaks)	Jennifer Metcalfe (Mercedes McQueen in Hollyoaks; Samia Ghadie (Maria Connor in Coronation Street); Samantha Janus (Ronnie Mitchell in EastEnders)
"Best Newcomer"	Michelle Keegan (Tina McIntyre in Coronation Street)	Stephen Lord (Jase Dyer in EastEnders); Rita Simons (Roxy Mitchell in EastEnders); Nico Mirallegro (Barry "Newt" Newton in Hollyoaks)
"Best Exit"	Gemma Bissix (Clare Devine in Hollyoaks)	Sophie Thompson (Stella Crawford in EastEnders); Peter Martin (Len Reynolds in Emmerdale); Guy Burnet (Craig Dean in Hollyoaks)
"Best Comedy Performance"	Maggie Jones (Blanche Hunt in Coronation Street)	Katherine Kelly (Becky Granger in Coronation Street); Cheryl Fergison (Heather Trott in EastEnders); Charlie Hardwick (Val Lambert in Emmerdale)
"Best On-Screen Partnership"	Matt Littler and Darren Jeffries (Max Cunningham and Sam "O.B." O'Brien in Hollyoaks)	David Neilson and Katherine Kelly (Roy Cropper and Becky Granger in Coronation Street); Cheryl Fergison and Linda Henry (Heather Trott and Shirley Carter in EastEnders); Samantha Janus and Rita Simons (Ronnie and Roxy Mitchell in EastEnders)
"Best Dramatic Performance"	Jo Joyner (Tanya Branning in EastEnders)	Jack P. Shepherd (David Platt in Coronation Street); Charlotte Bellamy (Laurel Thomas in Emmerdale); Emma Rigby (Hannah Ashworth in Hollyoaks)
"Best Dramatic Performance from a Young Actor or Actress"	Jamie Borthwick (Jay Brown in EastEnders)	Brooke Vincent (Sophie Webster in Coronation Street); Eden Taylor-Draper (Belle Dingle in Emmerdale); Ellis Hollins (Tom Cunningham in Hollyoaks)
"Villain of the Year"	Jack P. Shepherd (David Platt in Coronation Street)	Jake Wood (Max Branning in EastEnders); Barry Sloane (Niall Rafferty in Hollyoaks); Sophie Thompson (Stella Crawford in EastEnders)
"Spectacular Scene of the Year"	Clare and Katy drive off a cliff (Hollyoaks)	George and Nick's car crash (Doctors); The Land Rover rolls into the lake (EastEnders); Justin Burton is run over (Hollyoaks)
"Best Storyline"	The aftermath of Max and Stacey's affair (EastEnders)	John Paul and Craig's affair (Hollyoaks); Hannah's anorexia (Hollyoaks); Nick in a wheelchair and George's guilt (Doctors)
"Best Single Episode"	Heartbreak – Daniel's death (Emmerdale)	"Tread Softly/Up Close and Personal" (Doctors); Christmas Day 2007 (EastEnders) "The Revelation" (Hollyoaks)
"Special Achievement Award"	Tim Fee (a line producer for Emmerdale)	N/A
"Lifetime Achievement Award"; Presented by Kevin Kennedy	Liz Dawn (Vera Duckworth in Coronation Street)	N/A

==== 2009 ====
Clive Hornby, who played Jack Sugden in Emmerdale, was remembered during the ceremony, having died in July 2008. Wendy Richard, who played Pauline Fowler in EastEnders, was also remembered during the ceremony, having died in February 2009.

Award	Winners	Nominees
"Best British Soap"	EastEnders	Coronation Street; Crossroads; Doctors; Emmerdale; Hollyoaks
"Best Actor"	Robert Kazinsky (Sean Slater in EastEnders)	Simon Gregson (Steve McDonald in Coronation Street); Gray O'Brien (Tony Gordon in Coronation Street); Jamie Lomas (Warren Fox in Hollyoaks)
"Best Actress"	Katherine Kelly (Becky Granger in Coronation Street)	Samantha Janus (Ronnie Mitchell in EastEnders); Jo Joyner (Tanya Branning in EastEnders); Carley Stenson (Steph Cunningham in Hollyoaks)
"Sexiest Male"	Scott Maslen (Jack Branning in EastEnders)	Robert Kazinsky (Sean Slater in EastEnders); Chris Fountain (Justin Burton in Hollyoaks); Ricky Whittle (Calvin Valentine in Hollyoaks)
"Sexiest Female"	Michelle Keegan (Tina McIntyre in Coronation Street)	Kara Tointon (Dawn Swann in EastEnders); Lacey Turner (Stacey Branning in EastEnders); Emma Rigby (Hannah Ashworth in Hollyoaks)
"Best Newcomer"	Craig Gazey (Graeme Proctor in Coronation Street)	Selina Chilton (Ruth Pearce in Doctors); Shona McGarty (Whitney Dean in EastEnders); Jorgie Porter (Theresa McQueen in Hollyoaks)
"Best Exit"	Rob James-Collier (Liam Connor in Coronation Street)	Michael McKell (Nick West in Doctors); Matt Healy (Matthew King in Emmerdale); Matt Littler (Max Cunningham in Hollyoaks)
"Best Comedy Performance"	Nina Wadia (Zainab Masood in EastEnders)	Simon Gregson (Steve McDonald in Coronation Street); Dominic Brunt (Paddy Kirk in Emmerdale); Hollie-Jay Bowes (Michaela McQueen in Hollyoaks)
"Best On-Screen Partnership"; Presented by Katie Price and Peter Andre	Nitin Ganatra and Nina Wadia (Masood Ahmed and Zainab Masood in EastEnders)	Simon Gregson and Katherine Kelly (Steve McDonald and Becky Granger in Coronation Street); Mark Charnock and Dominic Brunt (Marlon Dingle and Paddy Kirk in Emmerdale); Nico Mirallegro and Marc Silcock (Barry "Newt" Newton and Eli in Hollyoaks)
"Best Dramatic Performance"	Anita Carey (Vivien March in Doctors)	Patsy Palmer (Bianca Jackson in EastEnders); Jenna-Louise Coleman (Jasmine Thomas in Emmerdale); Carley Stenson (Steph Cunningham in Hollyoaks)
"Best Dramatic Performance from a Young Actor or Actress"	Maisie Smith (Tiffany Dean in EastEnders)	Alex Bain (Simon Barlow in Coronation Street); Isabel Hodgins (Victoria Sugden in Emmerdale); Ellis Hollins (Tom Cunningham in Hollyoaks)
"Villain of the Year"	Gray O'Brien (Tony Gordon in Coronation Street)	Chris Coghill (Tony King in EastEnders); Larry Lamb (Archie Mitchell in EastEnders); Barry Sloane (Niall Rafferty in Hollyoaks)
"Spectacular Scene of the Year"	Victoria falls through the ice (Emmerdale)	The Homecoming (Doctors); The Millers' explosion (EastEnders); Church explosion (Hollyoaks)
"Best Storyline"	Vivien's Rape (Doctors)	Tony's revenge (Coronation Street); Bianca discovers Tony's a paedophile (EastEnders); Niall's revenge (Hollyoaks)
"Best Single Episode"	"A Kind of Hush" (Doctors)	Steve and Becky's failed wedding (Coronation Street); Bianca discovers the truth about Tony (EastEnders); Max and Steph's wedding (Hollyoaks)
"Special Achievement Award"	Peter Whalley (Coronation Street writer)	N/A
"Lifetime Achievement Award"; Presented by Ross Kemp and Steve McFadden	Barbara Windsor (Peggy Mitchell in EastEnders)	N/A

=== 2010s ===
==== 2010 ====
Maggie Jones, who played Blanche Hunt in Coronation Street, was remembered during the ceremony, having died in December 2009.

Award	Winners	Nominees
"Best British Soap"	EastEnders	Coronation Street; Doctors; Emmerdale; Hollyoaks
"Best Actor"	Scott Maslen (Jack Branning in EastEnders)	Chris Gascoyne (Peter Barlow in Coronation Street); Nitin Ganatra (Masood Ahmed in EastEnders); Danny Miller (Aaron Livesy in Emmerdale)
"Best Actress"	Lacey Turner (Stacey Branning in EastEnders)	Katherine Kelly (Becky McDonald in Coronation Street); Nina Wadia (Zainab Masood in EastEnders); Charlotte Bellamy (Laurel Thomas in Emmerdale)
"Sexiest Male"	Scott Maslen (Jack Branning in EastEnders)	Keith Duffy (Ciaran McCarthy in Coronation Street); John Partridge (Christian Clarke in EastEnders); Ricky Whittle (Calvin Valentine in Hollyoaks)
"Sexiest Female"	Michelle Keegan (Tina McIntyre in Coronation Street)	Kym Marsh (Michelle Connor in Coronation Street); Preeya Kalidas (Amira Masood in EastEnders); Samantha Womack (Ronnie Mitchell in EastEnders)
"Best Newcomer"; Presented by Ben Richards and Louie Spence	Marc Elliott (Syed Masood in EastEnders)	Sophie Abelson (Cherry Malone in Doctors); Lyndon Ogbourne (Nathan Wylde in Emmerdale); Bronagh Waugh (Cheryl Brady in Hollyoaks)
"Best Exit"	Charlie Clements (Bradley Branning in EastEnders)	Reece Dinsdale (Joe McIntyre in Coronation Street); Maxwell Caulfield (Mark Wylde in Emmerdale); Jamie Lomas (Warren Fox in Hollyoaks)
"Best Comedy Performance"	Craig Gazey (Graeme Proctor in Coronation Street)	Nina Wadia (Zainab Masood in EastEnders); Dominic Brunt (Paddy Kirk in Emmerdale); Bronagh Waugh (Cheryl Brady in Hollyoaks)
"Best On-Screen Partnership"	Chris Walker and Jan Pearson (Rob and Karen Hollins in Doctors)	Simon Gregson and Katherine Kelly (Steve and Becky McDonald in Coronation Street); Sid Owen and Patsy Palmer (Ricky and Bianca Butcher in EastEnders); Nick Miles and Nicola Wheeler (Jimmy King and Nicola De Souza in Emmerdale)
"Best Dramatic Performance"	Lacey Turner (Stacey Branning in EastEnders)	Chris Gascoyne (Peter Barlow in Coronation Street); Danny Miller (Aaron Livesy in Emmerdale); Glen Wallace (Malachy Fisher in Hollyoaks)
"Best Dramatic Performance from a Young Actor or Actress"; Presented by Tom Felton	Ami Metcalf (Sapphire Cox in Doctors)	Alex Bain (Simon Barlow in Coronation Street); Maisie Smith (Tiffany Butcher in EastEnders); Oscar Lloyd (Will Wylde in Emmerdale)
"Villain of the Year"	Larry Lamb (Archie Mitchell in EastEnders)	Gray O'Brien (Tony Gordon in Coronation Street); Don Gilet (Lucas Johnson in EastEnders); Siân Reeves (Sally Spode in Emmerdale)
"Spectacular Scene of the Year"	Sarah's parachute death (Hollyoaks)	Joe drowns (Coronation Street); Master of the Universe – Siege (Doctors); Home Farm Shop Crash (Emmerdale)
"Best Storyline"	Who Killed Archie? (EastEnders)	Peter's alcoholism (Coronation Street); Zara's revenge (Doctors); Aaron's gay self-loathing (Emmerdale)
"Best Single Episode"	EastEnders Live (EastEnders)	Peter falls off the wagon (Coronation Street) "Master of the Universe" (Doctors); Aaron confesses his sexuality (Emmerdale)
"Special Achievement Award"	Bill Lyons (Emmerdale writer)	N/A
"Lifetime Achievement Award"; Presented by Katherine Kelly	Betty Driver (Betty Williams in Coronation Street)	N/A

==== 2011 ====
Award	Winners	Nominees
"Best British Soap"; Presented by Jesse Metcalfe	EastEnders	Coronation Street; Doctors; Emmerdale; Hollyoaks
"Best Actor"	Danny Miller (Aaron Livesy in Emmerdale)	Chris Gascoyne (Peter Barlow in Coronation Street); Shane Richie (Alfie Moon in EastEnders); Emmett J. Scanlan (Brendan Brady in Hollyoaks)
"Best Actress"	Jessie Wallace (Kat Moon in EastEnders)	Katherine Kelly (Becky McDonald in Coronation Street); Jane Cox (Lisa Dingle in Emmerdale); Claire Cooper (Jacqui McQueen in Hollyoaks)
"Sexiest Male"; Presented by Sugababes	Scott Maslen (Jack Branning in EastEnders)	Keith Duffy (Ciaran McCarthy in Coronation Street); Chris Fountain (Tommy Duckworth in Coronation Street); Danny Miller (Aaron Livesy in Emmerdale)
"Sexiest Female"; Presented by McFly	Michelle Keegan (Tina McIntyre in Coronation Street)	Alison King (Carla Connor in Coronation Street); Rita Simons (Roxy Mitchell in EastEnders); Jennifer Metcalfe (Mercedes McQueen in Hollyoaks)
"Best Newcomer"	Emmett J. Scanlan (Brendan Brady in Hollyoaks)	Paula Lane (Kylie Turner in Coronation Street); Ricky Norwood (Fatboy in EastEnders); Pauline Quirke (Hazel Rhodes in Emmerdale)
"Best Exit"	Bill Tarmey (Jack Duckworth in Coronation Street)	Lacey Turner (Stacey Branning in EastEnders); Andy Devine (Shadrach Dingle in Emmerdale); Carley Stenson (Steph Roach in Hollyoaks)
"Best Comedy Performance"	Patti Clare (Mary Taylor in Coronation Street)	Tameka Empson (Kim Fox in EastEnders); Charlie Hardwick (Val Pollard in Emmerdale); Alex Carter (Lee Hunter in Hollyoaks)
"Best On-Screen Partnership"	Shane Richie and Jessie Wallace (Alfie and Kat Moon in EastEnders)	Simon Gregson and Katherine Kelly (Steve and Becky McDonald in Coronation Street); Jeff Hordley and Emma Atkins (Cain Dingle and Charity Tate in Emmerdale); Emmett J. Scanlan and Kieron Richardson (Brendan Brady and Ste Hay in Hollyoaks)
"Best Dramatic Performance"	Jane Danson (Leanne Battersby in Coronation Street)	Lindsey Coulson (Carol Jackson in EastEnders); Danny Miller (Aaron Livesy in Emmerdale); Claire Cooper (Jacqui McQueen in Hollyoaks)
"Best Young Performance"	Alex Bain (Simon Barlow in Coronation Street)	Maisie Smith (Tiffany Butcher in EastEnders); Eden Taylor-Draper (Belle Dingle in Emmerdale); Ellis Hollins (Tom Cunningham in Hollyoaks)
"Villain of the Year"	Emmett J. Scanlan (Brendan Brady in Hollyoaks)	Kate Ford (Tracy Barlow in Coronation Street); Charlie Brooks (Janine Malloy in EastEnders); Don Gilet (Lucas Johnson in EastEnders)
"Spectacular Scene of the Year"	The tram crash (Coronation Street)	The Queen Vic fire (EastEnders); The train crash (Emmerdale); The lift shaft (Hollyoaks)
"Best Storyline"	End of the line for the Websters and Dobbs (Coronation Street)	Karen's abortion (Doctors); Ronnie swaps her baby for Kat's (EastEnders); Holly's drug addiction (Emmerdale)
"Best Single Episode"	Coronation Street Live (Coronation Street)	23 August (Doctors); Billie's death (EastEnders); The Betrayed (Emmerdale)
"Special Achievement Award"; Presented by Danny Miller	Gavin Blyth (Emmerdale); posthumously	N/A
"Lifetime Achievement Award"; Presented by Liz Dawn	Bill Tarmey (Jack Duckworth in Coronation Street)	N/A

==== 2012 ====
Betty Driver, who played Betty Williams in Coronation Street, was remembered during the ceremony, having died in October 2011.

Award	Winners	Nominees
"Best British Soap"; Presented by Rupert Everett	EastEnders	Coronation Street; Doctors; Emmerdale; Hollyoaks
"Best Actor"	Danny Miller (Aaron Livesy in Emmerdale)	Chris Gascoyne (Peter Barlow in Coronation Street); Shane Richie (Alfie Moon in EastEnders); Emmett J. Scanlan (Brendan Brady in Hollyoaks)
"Best Actress"	Alison King (Carla Connor in Coronation Street)	Jo Joyner (Tanya Jessop in EastEnders); Nina Wadia (Zainab Masood in EastEnders); Karen Hassan (Lynsey Nolan in Hollyoaks)
"Sexiest Male"; Presented by Emma Bunton and Melanie C	Scott Maslen (Jack Branning in EastEnders)	Chris Fountain (Tommy Duckworth in Coronation Street); Matthew Wolfenden (David Metcalfe in Emmerdale); Danny Mac (Dodger Savage in Hollyoaks)
"Sexiest Female"; Presented by Keith Lemon	Michelle Keegan (Tina McIntyre in Coronation Street)	Jacqueline Jossa (Lauren Branning in EastEnders); Preeya Kalidas (Amira Masood in EastEnders); Jorgie Porter (Theresa McQueen in Hollyoaks)
"Best Newcomer"; Presented by Marcus Collins and Dionne Bromfield	Natalie Gumede (Kirsty Soames in Coronation Street)	Lu Corfield (Freya Wilson in Doctors); Jamie Foreman (Derek Branning in EastEnders); Gemma Oaten (Rachel Breckle in Emmerdale)
"Best Exit"; Presented by Lynne McGranger and Lisa Gormley	Katherine Kelly (Becky McDonald in Coronation Street)	Pam St Clement (Pat Evans in EastEnders); James Thornton (John Barton in Emmerdale); Kim Tiddy (Heidi Costello in Hollyoaks)
"Best Comedy Performance"; Presented by Bradley Walsh	Stephanie Cole (Sylvia Goodwin in Coronation Street)	Jan Pearson (Karen Hollins in Doctors); Tameka Empson (Kim Fox in EastEnders); Joe Tracini (Dennis Savage in Hollyoaks)
"Best On-Screen Partnership"	Jake Wood and Jo Joyner (Max Branning and Tanya Jessop in EastEnders)	Matthew Chambers and Elisabeth Dermot Walsh (Daniel Granger and Zara Carmichael in Doctors); Jeff Hordley and Emma Atkins (Cain Dingle and Charity Sharma in Emmerdale); Ashley Taylor Dawson and Jessica Fox (Darren and Nancy Osborne in Hollyoaks)
"Best Dramatic Performance"; Presented by Jerry Hall	Jo Joyner (Tanya Jessop in EastEnders)	Alison King (Carla Connor in Coronation Street); Owen Brenman (Heston Carter in Doctors); Jeff Hordley (Cain Dingle in Emmerdale)
"Best Young Performance"	Lorna Fitzgerald (Abi Branning in EastEnders)	Alex Bain (Simon Barlow in Coronation Street); Charlie Kenyon (Cameron Waterhouse in Doctors); Eden Taylor-Draper (Belle Dingle in Emmerdale)
"Villain of the Year"	Andrew Lancel (Frank Foster in Coronation Street)	Ace Bhatti (Yusef Khan in EastEnders); Joshua Pascoe (Ben Mitchell in EastEnders); Jeff Rawle (Silas Blissett in Hollyoaks)
"Spectacular Scene of the Year"	John and Moira's car accident (Emmerdale)	Carla's car crash (Coronation Street); Fire at the BandB (EastEnders); Rae's murder (Hollyoaks)
"Best Storyline"; Presented by Andrea McLean and Lisa Maxwell	Jackson's choice (Emmerdale)	Carla's rape ordeal (Coronation Street); Lauren's murder (Doctors); The Brannings deal with Tanya's cancer diagnosis (EastEnders)
"Best Single Episode"; Presented by Danny Dyer and Denise van Outen	Becky's Final Farewell (Coronation Street)	"Last Words" (Doctors); Pat: The End of an Era (EastEnders); The Longest Day (Emmerdale)
"Special Achievement Award"; Presented by Jake Wood	Simon Ashdown (EastEnders)	N/A
"Lifetime Achievement Award"; Presented by Sid Owen and Charlie Brooks	Pam St Clement (Pat Evans in EastEnders)	N/A

==== 2013 ====
Bill Tarmey, who played Jack Duckworth in Coronation Street, was remembered during the ceremony, having died in November 2012.

Award	Winners	Nominees
"Best British Soap"	Coronation Street	Doctors; EastEnders; Emmerdale; Hollyoaks
"Best Actor"; Presented by Emma Samms	Alan Halsall (Tyrone Dobbs in Coronation Street)	Nitin Ganatra (Masood Ahmed in EastEnders); Shane Richie (Alfie Moon in EastEnders); Jeff Hordley (Cain Dingle in Emmerdale); Emmett J. Scanlan (Brendan Brady in Hollyoaks)
"Best Actress"; Presented by Larry Lamb	Claire Cooper (Jacqui McQueen in Hollyoaks)	Jennie McAlpine (Fiz Stape in Coronation Street); Michelle Keegan (Tina McIntyre in Coronation Street); Jessie Wallace (Kat Moon in EastEnders); Nina Wadia (Zainab Khan in EastEnders)
"Sexiest Male"; Presented by Amanda Donohoe	Danny Mac (Dodger Savage in Hollyoaks)	Chris Fountain (Tommy Duckworth in Coronation Street); David Witts (Joey Branning in EastEnders); Matthew Wolfenden (David Metcalfe in Emmerdale); Kieron Richardson (Ste Hay in Hollyoaks)
"Sexiest Female"; Presented by Union J	Michelle Keegan (Tina McIntyre in Coronation Street)	Georgia May Foote (Katy Armstrong in Coronation Street); Jacqueline Jossa (Lauren Branning in EastEnders); Natalie Anderson (Alicia Gallagher in Emmerdale); Jorgie Porter (Theresa McQueen in Hollyoaks)
"Best Newcomer"; Presented by Alan Fletcher and Saskia Hampele	Joseph Thompson (Dr. Paul Browning in Hollyoaks)	Marc Baylis (Rob Donovan in Coronation Street); Ian Midlane (Al Haskey in Doctors); Khali Best (Dexter Hartman in EastEnders); Laura Norton (Kerry Wyatt in Emmerdale)
"Best Exit"; Presented by Mark Wright and Zoe Hardman	Nigel Havers (Lewis Archer in Coronation Street)	Lu Corfield (Freya Wilson in Doctors); Jamie Foreman (Derek Branning in EastEnders); Tom Lister (Carl King in Emmerdale); Emmett J. Scanlan (Brendan Brady in Hollyoaks)
"Best Comedy Performance"; Presented by Tommy Cannon and Bobby Ball	Patti Clare (Mary Taylor in Coronation Street)	Ian Kelsey (Howard Bellamy in Doctors); Ricky Norwood (Fatboy in EastEnders); Dominic Brunt (Paddy Kirk in Emmerdale); Nicole Barber-Lane (Myra McQueen in Hollyoaks)
"Best On-Screen Partnership"; Presented by Ashleigh and Pudsey	Emmett J. Scanlan and Kieron Richardson (Brendan Brady and Ste Hay in Hollyoaks)	Alan Halsall and Jennie McAlpine (Tyrone Dobbs and Fiz Stape in Coronation Street); Matthew Chambers and Elisabeth Dermot Walsh (Daniel Granger and Zara Carmichael in Doctors); Nitin Ganatra and Nina Wadia (Masood Ahmed and Zainab Khan in EastEnders); Dominic Power and Lucy Pargeter (Cameron Murray and Chas Spencer in Emmerdale)
"Best Dramatic Performance"; Presented by James and Ola Jordan	Natalie Gumede (Kirsty Soames in Coronation Street)	Dido Miles (Emma Reid in Doctors); Jo Joyner (Tanya Cross in EastEnders); Lucy Pargeter (Chas Spencer in Emmerdale); Claire Cooper (Jacqui McQueen in Hollyoaks)
"Best Young Performance"; Presented by Daniel Roche and Tyger Drew-Honey	Eden Taylor-Draper (Belle Dingle in Emmerdale)	Ellie Leach (Faye Windass in Coronation Street); Maisie Smith (Tiffany Butcher in EastEnders); Ellis Hollins (Tom Cunningham in Hollyoaks)
"Villain of the Year"; Presented by Jon Culshaw	Natalie Gumede (Kirsty Soames in Coronation Street)	Nigel Havers (Lewis Archer in Coronation Street); Jamie Foreman (Derek Branning in EastEnders); Dominic Power (Cameron Murray in Emmerdale); Emmett J. Scanlan (Brendan Brady in Hollyoaks)
"Spectacular Scene of the Year"; Presented by Nicola Adams and Luke Campbell	The bus crash (Hollyoaks)	The Rovers fire (Coronation Street); Julia's car crash (Doctors); The Olympic torch comes live to Walford (EastEnders); Cain's clifftop rescue of Zak (Emmerdale)
"Best Storyline"; Presented by Kate Silverton	Kirsty's abuse of Tyrone (Coronation Street)	Sam's assisted suicide (Doctors); The demise of Derek Branning (EastEnders); Zak's depression (Emmerdale); Esther's bullying (Hollyoaks)
"Best Single Episode"; Presented by Mary Berry	Emmerdale Live (Emmerdale)	Kirsty's treachery ends in Tyrone's arrest (Coronation Street) "The Scales" (Doctors); The identity of Kat's lover is revealed (EastEnders); The bus crash (Hollyoaks)
"Lifetime Achievement Award"; Presented by Gillian Taylforth	Adam Woodyatt (Ian Beale in EastEnders)	N/A

==== 2014 ====
Richard Thorp, who played Alan Turner in Emmerdale, was remembered during the ceremony, having died in May 2013. This was also the final ceremony where "Sexiest Male" and "Sexiest Female" were awarded; Michelle Keegan, who plays Tina McIntyre in Coronation Street, won "Sexiest Female" for the sixth time in a row.

Award	Winners	Nominees
"Best British Soap"; Presented by Sir Ian McKellen	Hollyoaks	Coronation Street; Doctors; EastEnders; Emmerdale
"Best Actor"; Presented by Lynda La Plante	David Neilson (Roy Cropper in Coronation Street)	Danny Dyer (Mick Carter in EastEnders); Jeff Hordley (Cain Dingle in Emmerdale); Jeremy Sheffield (Patrick Blake in Hollyoaks); Kieron Richardson (Ste Hay in Hollyoaks)
"Best Actress"; Presented by Colin Salmon	Julie Hesmondhalgh (Hayley Cropper in Coronation Street)	Lacey Turner (Stacey Branning in EastEnders); Lindsey Coulson (Carol Jackson in EastEnders); Stephanie Davis (Sinead Roscoe in Hollyoaks); Nikki Sanderson (Maxine Minniver in Hollyoaks)
"Sexiest Male"; Presented by Ashley Roberts and Myleene Klass	Danny Mac (Dodger Savage in Hollyoaks)	Ryan Thomas (Jason Grimshaw in Coronation Street); Danny Dyer (Mick Carter in EastEnders); Matthew Wolfenden (David Metcalfe in Emmerdale); Ashley Taylor Dawson (Darren Osborne in Hollyoaks)
"Sexiest Female"; Presented by Ashley Banjo and Perri Kiely	Michelle Keegan (Tina McIntyre in Coronation Street)	Georgia May Foote (Katy Armstrong in Coronation Street); Jacqueline Jossa (Lauren Branning in EastEnders); Jorgie Porter (Theresa McQueen in Hollyoaks); Jennifer Metcalfe (Mercedes Browning in Hollyoaks)
"Best Newcomer"; Presented by Sam Bailey and Charlotte Hawkins	Maddy Hill (Nancy Carter in EastEnders)	Amy Kelly (Maddie Heath in Coronation Street); Michael Parr (Ross Barton in Emmerdale); Charlie Clapham (Freddie Roscoe in Hollyoaks)
"Best Comedy Performance"; Presented by Vic Reeves	Simon Gregson (Steve McDonald in Coronation Street)	Sarah Moyle (Valerie Pitman in Doctors); Linda Henry (Shirley Carter in EastEnders); Laura Norton (Kerry Wyatt in Emmerdale); Dan Tetsell (Jim McGinn in Hollyoaks)
"Best On-Screen Partnership"; Presented by Marvin and Rochelle Humes	David Neilson and Julie Hesmondhalgh (Roy and Hayley Cropper in Coronation Street)	Danielle Henry and Lu Corfield (Mandy Marquez and Lois Wilson in Doctors); Danny Dyer and Kellie Bright (Mick and Linda Carter in EastEnders); Chris Chittell and Charlie Hardwick (Eric and Val Pollard in Emmerdale); Joseph Thompson and Jennifer Metcalfe (Dr. Paul and Mercedes Browning in Hollyoaks)
"Best Dramatic Performance"; Presented by Lesley Nicol and Roger Allam	David Neilson (Roy Cropper in Coronation Street)	Chris Walker (Rob Hollins in Doctors); Lindsey Coulson (Carol Jackson in EastEnders); Charley Webb (Debbie Dingle in Emmerdale); Stephanie Davis (Sinead Roscoe in Hollyoaks)
"Best Young Performance"; Presented by Joey Essex and Dani Harmer	Ellis Hollins (Tom Cunningham in Hollyoaks)	Alex Bain (Simon Barlow in Coronation Street); Oliver Woollford (Tom Finlayson in Doctors); Mimi Keene (Cindy Williams in EastEnders); Joe-Warren Plant (Jacob Gallagher in Emmerdale)
"Villain of the Year"; Presented by Martin Kemp	Anna Passey (Sienna Blake in Hollyoaks)	Charlie Brooks (Janine Butcher in EastEnders); Dominic Power (Cameron Murray in Emmerdale); Greg Wood (Trevor Royle in Hollyoaks); Jesse Birdsall (Fraser Black in Hollyoaks)
"Spectacular Scene of the Year"; Presented by David Weir and David Seaman	The Woolpack siege and flood (Emmerdale)	Nick and David's car crash (Coronation Street); Opening of Austenland (Doctors); Johnny comes out to Mick (EastEnders); Hollyoaks Blast (Hollyoaks)
"Best Storyline"; Presented by Ray Meagher and Ada Nicodemou	Hayley's cancer battle (Coronation Street)	Jas' stalking (Doctors); Hello Stacey, Goodbye Janine (EastEnders); Killer Cameron (Emmerdale); Sienna steals Nancy's life (Hollyoaks)
"Best Single Episode"; Presented by Terry Wogan	Hayley's death (Coronation Street)	"Perfect" (Doctors); Lucy's death – The Aftermath (EastEnders); The Woolpack siege (Emmerdale); John Paul's rape ordeal (Hollyoaks)
"Outstanding Achievement Award"; Presented by Brian Capron and Judi Hayfield	Helen Worth (Gail McIntyre in Coronation Street)	N/A
"Outstanding Achievement Award (Off-screen)"	Carolyn Weinstein (EastEnders)	N/A

==== 2015 ====
Anne Kirkbride, who played Deirdre Barlow in Coronation Street, was remembered during the ceremony, having died in January 2015. John Bardon, who played Jim Branning in EastEnders, was also remembered during the ceremony, having died in September 2014.

Award	Winners	Nominees
"Best British Soap"; Presented by Patrick Duffy	EastEnders	Coronation Street; Doctors; Emmerdale; Hollyoaks
"Best Actor"; Presented by Jessica Hynes	Adam Woodyatt (Ian Beale in EastEnders)	Simon Gregson (Steve McDonald in Coronation Street); David Neilson (Roy Cropper in Coronation Street); Danny Dyer (Mick Carter in EastEnders); Michael Parr (Ross Barton in Emmerdale)
"Best Actress"; Presented by Phil Davis	Kellie Bright (Linda Carter in EastEnders)	Alison King (Carla Connor in Coronation Street); Laurie Brett (Jane Beale in EastEnders); Natalie Anderson (Alicia Metcalfe in Emmerdale); Nikki Sanderson (Maxine Minniver in Hollyoaks)
"Best Newcomer"; Presented by Collabro	Jessica Regan (Niamh Donoghue in Doctors)	Sean Ward (Callum Logan in Coronation Street); Davood Ghadami (Kush Kazemi in EastEnders); Ryan Hawley (Robert Sugden in Emmerdale); Twinnie-Lee Moore (Porsche McQueen in Hollyoaks)
"Best Comedy Performance"; Presented by Tom Rosenthal and Vogue Williams	Sally Dynevor (Sally Webster in Coronation Street)	Sarah Moyle (Valerie Pitman in Doctors); Tameka Empson (Kim Fox-Hubbard in EastEnders); Laura Norton (Kerry Wyatt in Emmerdale); Fabrizio Santino (Ziggy Roscoe in Hollyoaks)
"Best On-Screen Partnership"; Presented by Vincent Simone and Flavia Cacace	Adam Woodyatt and Laurie Brett (Ian and Jane Beale in EastEnders)	Joe Duttine and Sally Dynevor (Tim Metcalfe and Sally Webster in Coronation Street); Ian Midlane and Jessica Regan (Al Haskey and Niamh Donoghue in Doctors); Michael Parr and Verity Rushworth (Ross Barton and Donna Windsor in Emmerdale); Ellis Hollins and Ruby O'Donnell (Tom Cunningham and Peri Lomax in Hollyoaks)
"Best Dramatic Performance"; Presented by Anita Dobson	Kellie Bright (Linda Carter in EastEnders)	Simon Gregson (Steve McDonald in Coronation Street); Lorna Laidlaw (Mrs Tembe in Doctors); Natalie Anderson (Alicia Metcalfe in Emmerdale); Keith Rice (Finn O'Connor in Hollyoaks)
"Best Young Performance"; Presented by Little Ant and Dec	Amelia Flanagan (April Windsor in Emmerdale)	Ellie Leach (Faye Windass in Coronation Street); Jack Carroll (Peter Harker in Doctors); Eliot Carrington (Bobby Beale in EastEnders); Ruby O'Donnell (Peri Lomax in Hollyoaks)
"Villain of the Year"; Presented by Robert Rinder	Jeremy Sheffield (Patrick Blake in Hollyoaks)	Sean Ward (Callum Logan in Coronation Street); Daniel Schutzmann (Franc Christophe in Doctors); John Altman (Nick Cotton in EastEnders); Ryan Hawley (Robert Sugden in Emmerdale)
"Spectacular Scene of the Year"; Presented by Rebecca Adlington and Martin Offiah	Donna's Goodbye (Emmerdale)	Deirdre throws the trifle (Coronation Street); Strictly Dancing (Doctors); Kathy Comes Home (EastEnders); The Train Crash (Hollyoaks)
"Best Storyline"; Presented by David Dickinson and Marian Keyes	Who Killed Lucy Beale? (EastEnders)	Steve and Michelle – Hearts and Minds (Coronation Street); Kevin and Poppy's underage relationship (Doctors); Donna's demise (Emmerdale); John Paul's rape ordeal (Hollyoaks)
"Best Single Episode"; Presented by Debra Stephenson and Ricky Tomlinson	EastEnders Live (EastEnders)	Rob's confession (Coronation Street) "Unfinished Business" (Doctors); Andy goes to the brink (Emmerdale); Ste's HIV diagnosis (Hollyoaks)
"Outstanding Achievement Award"; Presented by William Roache and Beverley Callard	Anne Kirkbride (Deirdre Barlow in Coronation Street); posthumously	N/A
"Outstanding Achievement Award" (off-screen); Presented by Diane Parish and Gillian Taylforth	Rob Gittins (EastEnders writer)	N/A

This year's ceremony incorporated a "Social Issue Storyline" mention, which is where all of the soap operas' most controversial stories were specially mentioned. These include:

- Steve's depression (Coronation Street)
- John Paul's rape (Hollyoaks)
- Zara's breast-feeding campaign (Doctors)
- Val's HIV diagnosis (Emmerdale)
- Linda's rape (EastEnders)

==== 2016 ====
Peter Baldwin (Derek Wilton in Coronation Street), Stephen Hancock (Ernest Bishop in Coronation Street), Shirley Stelfox (Edna Birch in Emmerdale), Kitty McGeever (Lizzie Lakely in Emmerdale), Kristian Ealey (Matt Musgrove in Brookside and Hollyoaks) and Morag Siller (Marilyn Dingle in Emmerdale) were remembered during the ceremony which was held on 29 May.

Award	Winners	Nominees
"Best British Soap"; Presented by Joan Collins	Emmerdale	Coronation Street; Doctors; EastEnders; Hollyoaks
"Best Actor"; Presented by Brenda Blethyn	Danny Miller (Aaron Livesy in Emmerdale)	Jack P. Shepherd (David Platt in Coronation Street); Danny Dyer (Mick Carter in EastEnders); Charlie Clapham (Freddie Roscoe in Hollyoaks); Kieron Richardson (Ste Hay in Hollyoaks)
"Best Actress"; Presented by Patrick Baladi	Lacey Turner (Stacey Fowler in EastEnders)	Alison King (Carla Connor in Coronation Street); Rakhee Thakrar (Shabnam Masood in EastEnders); Lucy Pargeter (Chas Dingle in Emmerdale); Jennifer Metcalfe (Mercedes McQueen in Hollyoaks)
"Best Newcomer"; Presented by Vicky Pattison and George Shelley	Bonnie Langford (Carmel Kazemi in EastEnders)	Shayne Ward (Aidan Connor in Coronation Street); Bharti Patel (Ruhma Hanif in Doctors); Isobel Steele (Liv Flaherty in Emmerdale); Duayne Boachie (Zack Loveday in Hollyoaks)
"Best Comedy Performance"; Presented by Al Murray	Patti Clare (Mary Taylor in Coronation Street)	Sarah Moyle (Valerie Pitman in Doctors); Tameka Empson (Kim Fox-Hubbard in EastEnders); Matthew Wolfenden (David Metcalfe in Emmerdale); Ross Adams (Scott Drinkwell in Hollyoaks)
"Best On-Screen Partnership"; Presented by Dom and Steph Parker	Joe Duttine and Sally Dynevor (Tim and Sally Metcalfe in Coronation Street)	Ian Kelsey and Dido Miles (Howard Bellamy and Emma Reid in Doctors); Danny Dyer and Kellie Bright (Mick and Linda Carter in EastEnders); Danny Miller and Ryan Hawley (Aaron Livesy and Robert Sugden in Emmerdale); Ashley Taylor Dawson and Jessica Fox (Darren and Nancy Osborne in Hollyoaks)
"Best Female Dramatic Performance"; Presented by Jason Watkins	Lacey Turner (Stacey Fowler in EastEnders)	Tina O'Brien (Sarah Platt in Coronation Street); Sarah Moyle (Valerie Pitman in Doctors); Charlotte Bellamy (Laurel Thomas in Emmerdale); Zöe Lucker (Reenie McQueen in Hollyoaks)
"Best Male Dramatic Performance"; Presented by Amanda Mealing	Danny Miller (Aaron Livesy in Emmerdale)	Jack P. Shepherd (David Platt in Coronation Street); Adrian Lewis Morgan (Jimmi Clay in Doctors); Steve McFadden (Phil Mitchell in EastEnders); Jeremy Sheffield (Patrick Blake in Hollyoaks)
"Best Young Performance"; Presented by Reggie and Bollie	Ruby O'Donnell (Peri Lomax in Hollyoaks)	Elle Mulvaney (Amy Barlow in Coronation Street); Grace (Janet Mitchell in EastEnders); Amelia Flanagan (April Windsor in Emmerdale)
"Villain of the Year"; Presented by Steve Pemberton	Connor McIntyre (Pat Phelan in Coronation Street)	Adam Astill (Anthony Harker in Doctors); Ellen Thomas (Claudette Hubbard in EastEnders); Ryan Hawley (Robert Sugden in Emmerdale); Sophie Austin (Lindsey Roscoe in Hollyoaks)
"Scene of the Year"; Presented by Nadiya Hussain	Val's death (Emmerdale)	Callum's death (Coronation Street); Valerie leaves Barry at the altar (Doctors); Mick and Linda finally get married (EastEnders); Nico kills Patrick (Hollyoaks)
"Best Storyline"; Presented by Kay Burley	Stacey's postpartum psychosis (EastEnders)	Callum's reign of terror and Sarah's baby (Coronation Street); Treehouse (Doctors); Aaron's abuse (Emmerdale); The McQueen's cycle of abuse (Hollyoaks)
"Best Single Episode"; Presented by John Prescott	"The Heart of England" (Doctors)	The Live Episode (Coronation Street); Shabnam's stillbirth (EastEnders); Aftermath of Village Hall explosion (Emmerdale); Patrick's right to die decision (Hollyoaks)
"Outstanding Achievement Award"; Presented by Adam Woodyatt	Steve McFadden (Phil Mitchell in EastEnders)	N/A
"The Tony Warren Award"; Presented by Charles Lawson	James Bain (Coronation Street and Emmerdale Casting Director)	N/A

==== 2017 ====
The 2017 awards took place on 3 June 2017 at The Lowry in Salford. It was originally planned for the event to be broadcast live for the first time but due to ITV moving the live grand final of Britain's Got Talent into its scheduled timeslot, the awards were instead pre-recorded as before and broadcast on ITV on 6 June 2017. After the end credits in the broadcast version, dedications appeared to Jean Alexander (Hilda Ogden in Coronation Street), who died in October 2016, and Roy Barraclough (Alec Gilroy in Coronation Street), who died in June 2017.

Award	Winners	Nominees
"Best British Soap"; Presented by Adrian Dunbar	Emmerdale	Coronation Street; Doctors; EastEnders; Hollyoaks
"Best Actor"; Presented by Tamzin Outhwaite	John Middleton (Ashley Thomas in Emmerdale)	Jack P. Shepherd (David Platt in Coronation Street); Danny Miller (Aaron Dingle in Emmerdale); Jamie Lomas (Warren Fox in Hollyoaks); Gregory Finnegan (James Nightingale in Hollyoaks)
"Best Actress"; Presented by David Bradley	Charlotte Bellamy (Laurel Thomas in Emmerdale)	Kym Marsh (Michelle Connor in Coronation Street); Lucy Fallon (Bethany Platt in Coronation Street); Lacey Turner (Stacey Fowler in EastEnders); Anna Passey (Sienna Blake in Hollyoaks)
"Best Newcomer"; Presented by Roman Kemp and Vick Hope	Rob Mallard (Daniel Osbourne in Coronation Street)	Ritu Arya (Dr. Megan Sharma in Doctors); Zack Morris (Keegan Baker in EastEnders); Sally Dexter (Faith Dingle in Emmerdale); Duncan James (Ryan Knight in Hollyoaks)
"Best Comedy Performance"; Presented by Rebecca Front	Dolly-Rose Campbell (Gemma Winter in Coronation Street)	Elisabeth Dermot Walsh (Zara Carmichael in Doctors); Tameka Empson (Kim Fox-Hubbard in EastEnders); Dominic Brunt (Paddy Kirk in Emmerdale); Nicole Barber-Lane (Myra McQueen in Hollyoaks)
"Best On-Screen Partnership"; Presented by Faye Tozer and Lee Latchford-Evans	Richard Linnell and Kassius Nelson (Alfie Nightingale and Jade Albright in Hollyoaks)	Malcolm Hebden and Patti Clare (Norris Cole and Mary Taylor in Coronation Street); Matthew Chambers and Elisabeth Dermot Walsh (Daniel Granger and Zara Carmichael in Doctors); James Bye and Lacey Turner (Martin and Stacey Fowler in EastEnders); John Middleton and Charlotte Bellamy (Ashley and Laurel Thomas in Emmerdale)
"Best Male Dramatic Performance"; Presented by John Thomson	John Middleton (Ashley Thomas in Emmerdale)	Simon Gregson (Steve McDonald in Coronation Street); Ian Midlane (Al Haskey in Doctors); Steve McFadden (Phil Mitchell in EastEnders); Kieron Richardson (Ste Hay in Hollyoaks)
"Best Female Dramatic Performance"; Presented by Martine McCutcheon	Kym Marsh (Michelle Connor in Coronation Street)	Dido Miles (Emma Reid in Doctors); Diane Parish (Denise Fox in EastEnders); Charlotte Bellamy (Laurel Thomas in Emmerdale); Nadine Rose Mulkerrin (Cleo McQueen in Hollyoaks)
"Best Young Actor"; Presented by Honor Kneafsey	Elle Mulvaney (Amy Barlow in Coronation Street)	Bleu Landau (Dennis Rickman Jnr in EastEnders); Isobel Steele (Liv Flaherty in Emmerdale); Elà-May Demircan (Leah Barnes in Hollyoaks)
"Villain of the Year"; Presented by Gray O'Brien	Lucy-Jo Hudson (Rhiannon Davis in Doctors)	Connor McIntyre (Pat Phelan in Coronation Street); Jake Wood (Max Branning in EastEnders); Gillian Kearney (Emma Barton in Emmerdale); Persephone Swales-Dawson (Nico Blake in Hollyoaks)
"Scene of the Year"; Presented by Stephen McGann and Laura Main	Jade says goodbye to Alfie (Hollyoaks)	Michelle's goodbye to Ruairi (Coronation Street); Haunted by his voices (Doctors); Ronnie and Roxy's exit (EastEnders); The Hotten bypass pile-up (Emmerdale)
"Best Storyline"; Presented by Charlene White	Ashley's dementia (Emmerdale)	The grooming of Bethany (Coronation Street); Rhiannon's second chance (Doctors); Lee's mental health (EastEnders); Teenage cancer (Hollyoaks)
"Best Single Episode"; Presented by Ore Oduba and Joanne Clifton	Ashley's Point of View (Emmerdale)	Kylie's death (Coronation Street) "A Christmas Carol" (Doctors); Lee on the edge (EastEnders) "What is Consent?" (Hollyoaks)
"Outstanding Achievement Award"; Presented by Will Mellor	Nick Pickard (Tony Hutchinson in Hollyoaks)	N/A
The Tony Warren Award"; Presented by Pam St Clement	Gillian Richmond (EastEnders writer)	N/A

==== 2018 ====
The 2018 awards were broadcast live for the first time on 2 June 2018. Liz Dawn, who played Vera Duckworth in Coronation Street, was remembered during the ceremony, having died in September 2017.

Award	Winners	Nominees
"Best British Soap"; Presented by Sharon Gless and Tyne Daly	Coronation Street	Doctors; EastEnders; Emmerdale; Hollyoaks
"Best Actor"; Presented by Wendy Craig	Jack P. Shepherd (David Platt in Coronation Street)	Connor McIntyre (Pat Phelan in Coronation Street); Michael Parr (Ross Barton in Emmerdale); Ryan Hawley (Robert Sugden in Emmerdale); Theo Graham (Hunter McQueen in Hollyoaks)
"Best Actress"; Presented by Sally Lindsay	Lucy Fallon (Bethany Platt in Coronation Street)	Catherine Tyldesley (Eva Price in Coronation Street); Lacey Turner (Stacey Fowler in EastEnders); Emma Atkins (Charity Dingle in Emmerdale); Anna Passey (Sienna Blake in Hollyoaks)
"Best Newcomer"; Presented by Danny Jones	Lorraine Stanley (Karen Taylor in EastEnders)	Nicola Thorp (Nicola Rubinstein in Coronation Street); Reis Bruce (Austin Lonsdale in Doctors); Andrew Scarborough (Graham Foster in Emmerdale); Lauren McQueen (Lily Drinkwell in Hollyoaks)
"Best Comedy Performance"; Presented by Sherrie Hewson and Tony Maudsley	Ian Midlane (Al Haskey in Doctors)	Louiza Patikas (Moira Pollock in Coronation Street); Nitin Ganatra (Masood Ahmed in EastEnders); Sally Dexter (Faith Dingle in Emmerdale); Nicole Barber-Lane (Myra McQueen in Hollyoaks)
"Best On-Screen Partnership"; Presented by Andrea McLean and Stacey Solomon	Theo Graham and Malique Thompson-Dwyer (Hunter and Prince McQueen in Hollyoaks)	Bhavna Limbachia and Faye Brookes (Rana Nazir and Kate Connor in Coronation Street); Matthew Chambers and Elisabeth Dermot Walsh (Daniel Granger and Zara Carmichael in Doctors); Jake Wood and Lacey Turner (Max Branning and Stacey Fowler in EastEnders); Ned Porteous and Andrew Scarborough (Joe Tate and Graham Foster in Emmerdale)
"Best Male Dramatic Performance"; Presented by Tony Hadley	Ross Adams (Scott Drinkwell in Hollyoaks)	Connor McIntyre (Pat Phelan in Coronation Street); Chris Walker (Rob Hollins in Doctors); Jake Wood (Max Branning in EastEnders); Jeff Hordley (Cain Dingle in Emmerdale)
"Best Female Dramatic Performance"; Presented by Shirley Ballas	Lucy Fallon (Bethany Platt in Coronation Street)	Laura Rollins (Ayesha Lee in Doctors); Lacey Turner (Stacey Fowler in EastEnders); Natalie J. Robb (Moira Dingle in Emmerdale); Nadine Rose Mulkerrin (Cleo McQueen in Hollyoaks)
"Best Young Actor"; Presented by Daisy Waterstone and Milo Parker	Isobel Steele (Liv Flaherty in Emmerdale)	Matilda Freeman (Summer Spellman in Coronation Street); Maisie Smith (Tiffany Butcher in EastEnders); Elà-May Dermican (Leah Barnes in Hollyoaks)
"Villain of the Year"; Presented by Danny John-Jules	Connor McIntyre (Pat Phelan in Coronation Street)	Ryan Prescott (Liam Slade in Doctors); Jake Wood (Max Branning in EastEnders); Gillian Kearney (Emma Barton in Emmerdale); David Easter (Mac Nightingale in Hollyoaks)
"Scene of the Year"; Presented by Brooke Kinsella and Maggie Oliver	Bollywood proposal (Doctors); Lauren and Abi's rooftop fall (EastEnders)	The grooming of Bethany (Coronation Street); Emma meets her fate (Emmerdale); Scott's suicide note (Hollyoaks)
"Best Storyline"; Presented by Ranvir Singh	Lily's self-harm (Hollyoaks)	Phelan's reign of terror (Coronation Street) "Consequences" – Rob's PTSD (Doctors); Karma for Max (EastEnders); Who Killed Emma? (Emmerdale)
"Best Single Episode"; Presented by Louise Redknapp	"Three Mothers, Three Daughters" (Hollyoaks)	Eva and Aidan's wedding debacle (Coronation Street) "Stop All The Clocks" (Doctors); Max's last stand (EastEnders); Cain and Faith flashback (Emmerdale)
"Outstanding Achievement Award"; Presented by Floella Benjamin	Rudolph Walker (Patrick Trueman in EastEnders)	N/A
"The Tony Warren Award"; Presented by Brian Capron	Kieran Roberts (Coronation Street producer)	N/A
"Greatest Moment"; Presented by Richard Madeley	Hotten bypass crash (Emmerdale, 2016)	Richard Hillman drives his family into the canal (Coronation Street, 2003); Vivien's rape (Doctors, 2008) "You ain't my mother" (EastEnders, 2001); Jade says goodbye to Alfie (Hollyoaks, 2016)

==== 2019 ====
The 2019 awards what would be the last ever ceremony before the COVID-19 pandemic were broadcast live on 1 June 2019.

Award	Winners	Nominees
"Best British Soap"; Presented by Jane Seymour	Hollyoaks	Coronation Street; Doctors; EastEnders; Emmerdale
"Best Actor"; Presented by Ruthie Henshall	Gregory Finnegan (James Nightingale in Hollyoaks)	Jack P. Shepherd (David Platt in Coronation Street); Danny Dyer (Mick Carter in EastEnders); Zack Morris (Keegan Baker in EastEnders); Jeff Hordley (Cain Dingle in Emmerdale)
"Best Actress"; Presented by Ioan Gruffudd	Lucy Pargeter (Chas Dingle in Emmerdale)	Alison King (Carla Connor in Coronation Street); Lorraine Stanley (Karen Taylor in EastEnders); Stephanie Davis (Sinead Shelby in Hollyoaks); Lauren McQueen (Lily McQueen in Hollyoaks)
"Best Newcomer"; Presented by Rahul Mandal and Molly Hocking	Alexandra Mardell (Emma Brooker in Coronation Street)	Bethan Moore (Izzie Torres in Doctors); Ricky Champ (Stuart Highway in EastEnders); James Moore (Ryan Stocks in Emmerdale); Tylan Grant (Brooke Hathaway in Hollyoaks)
"Best Comedy Performance"; Presented by Tony Way and Mandeep Dhillon	Sarah Moyle (Valerie Pitman in Doctors)	Patti Clare (Mary Taylor in Coronation Street); Tameka Empson (Kim Fox-Hubbard in EastEnders); Nicola Wheeler (Nicola King in Emmerdale); Jessamy Stoddart (Liberty Savage in Hollyoaks)
"Best On-Screen Partnership"; Presented by Mark Curry and Yvette Fielding	Roger Griffiths and Kara-Leah Fernandes (Mitch and Bailey Baker in EastEnders)	Simon Gregson and Kate Ford (Steve and Tracy McDonald in Coronation Street); Ian Midlane and Adrian Lewis Morgan (Al Haskey and Jimmi Clay in Doctors); Dominic Brunt and Lucy Pargeter (Paddy Kirk and Chas Dingle in Emmerdale); Nick Pickard and Alex Fletcher (Tony and Diane Hutchinson in Hollyoaks)
"Best Male Dramatic Performance"; Presented by Ashley Walters	Adam Woodward (Brody Hudson in Hollyoaks)	Rob Mallard (Daniel Osbourne in Coronation Street); Ian Midlane (Al Haskey in Doctors); Zack Morris (Keegan Baker in EastEnders); Dominic Brunt (Paddy Kirk in Emmerdale)
"Best Female Dramatic Performance"; Presented by Maya Sondhi	Gillian Wright (Jean Slater in EastEnders)	Katie McGlynn (Sinead Tinker in Coronation Street); Elisabeth Dermot Walsh (Zara Carmichael in Doctors); Lucy Pargeter (Chas Dingle in Emmerdale); Nadine Rose Mulkerrin (Cleo McQueen in Hollyoaks)
"Best Young Actor"; Presented by Pixie Davies, Nathanael Saleh and Joel Dawson	Kara-Leah Fernandes (Bailey Baker in EastEnders)	Elle Mulvaney (Amy Barlow in Coronation Street); Oliver Falconer (Joe Granger Carmichael in Doctors); Joe-Warren Plant (Jacob Gallagher in Emmerdale); Lacey Findlow (Dee Dee Hutchinson in Hollyoaks)
"Villain of the Year"; Presented by Jenny Ryan	Nathan Sussex (Buster Smith in Hollyoaks)	Greg Wood (Rick Neelan in Coronation Street); Matthew Chambers (Daniel Granger in Doctors); Ricky Champ (Stuart Highway in EastEnders); Claire King (Kim Tate in Emmerdale)
"Scene of the Year"; Presented by Dan Walker and Anita Rani	Gail's monologue (Coronation Street)	The crash (Doctors); Shakil's funeral (EastEnders); Cain's confession to Debbie (Emmerdale); Brody confronts his abuser, Buster (Hollyoaks)
"Best Storyline"; Presented by Victoria Derbyshire	The impact of Aidan's suicide (Coronation Street)	Daniel and Zara's break-up (Doctors); Knife crime (EastEnders); Charity's abuse (Emmerdale); Footballer abuse (Hollyoaks)
"Best Single Episode"; Presented by Nick Knowles	Aidan's suicide and the aftermath (Coronation Street)	"And the Beat Goes On..." (Doctors); Consent (EastEnders); Chas and Paddy say goodbye to baby Grace (Emmerdale) "Where Do I Belong?" (Hollyoaks).
"Outstanding Achievement Award"; Presented by Tracy Shaw	Sue Nicholls (Audrey Roberts in Coronation Street)	N/A
"The Tony Warren Award"; Presented by Mark Charnock	Val Lawson (Emmerdale assistant director)	N/A

=== 2020s ===
==== 2022 ====
The 2022 awards were broadcast live on 11 June 2022. This was Schofield's last as host. A tribute was paid to Australian soap opera Neighbours, after filming ended the day before the ceremony, with video messages from Ian Smith (Harold Bishop) and Jackie Woodburne (Susan Kennedy).

The In memoriam segment paid tribute to Paula Tilbrook (Betty Eagleton in Emmerdale), Lynda Baron (Linda Clarke in EastEnders and Ag Penrose in Doctors), Mark Eden (Alan Bradley in Coronation Street), Anna Karen (Aunt Sal in EastEnders), Neville Buswell (Ray Langton in Coronation Street), Patricia Brake (Deirdre Foster in EastEnders and Viv Baldwin in Coronation Street), Barbara Windsor (Peggy Mitchell in EastEnders), Leah Bracknell (Zoe Tate in Emmerdale), Leonard Fenton (Dr. Harold Legg in EastEnders), Kay Mellor (Coronation Street and Brookside writer), Sheila Mercier (Annie Sugden in Emmerdale), Frank Mills (Billy Williams in Coronation Street), Johnny Briggs (Mike Baldwin in Coronation Street), Roy Hudd (Archie Shuttleworth in Coronation Street), Stephen Churchett (Marcus Christie in EastEnders), Freddie Jones (Sandy Thomas in Emmerdale), Melanie Clark Pullen (Mary Flaherty in EastEnders), Johnny Leeze (Harry Clayton in Coronation Street and Ned Glover in Emmerdale), and June Brown (Dot Cotton in EastEnders), who all died between the 2019 and 2022 ceremonies.

Award	Winners	Nominees
Best British Soap; Presented by Stephanie Beacham	Emmerdale	Coronation Street; Doctors; EastEnders; Hollyoaks
Best Comedy Performance; Presented by Lauren Socha and Barney Walsh	Tameka Empson (Kim Fox in EastEnders)	Jane Hazlegrove (Bernie Winter in Coronation Street); Sarah Moyle (Valerie Pitman in Doctors); Lisa Riley (Mandy Dingle in Emmerdale); Chelsee Healey (Goldie McQueen in Hollyoaks)
Best Dramatic Performance; Presented by Janette Manrara and Aljaž Škorjanec	Mark Charnock (Marlon Dingle in Emmerdale)	Sally Carman (Abi Webster in Coronation Street); Dex Lee (Bear Sylvester in Doctors); Gillian Wright (Jean Slater in EastEnders); Harvey Virdi (Misbah Maalik in Hollyoaks)
Best Family; Presented by Billie Shepherd and Greg Shepherd	The Dingles (Emmerdale)	The Alahans (Coronation Street); The Carters (EastEnders); The McQueens (Hollyoaks)
Best Leading Performer; Presented by Hugh Quarshie	Paige Sandhu (Meena Jutla in Emmerdale)	Sally Carman (Abi Webster in Coronation Street); Linda Henry (Shirley Carter in EastEnders); Gillian Wright (Jean Slater in EastEnders); Mark Charnock (Marlon Dingle in Emmerdale)
Best Newcomer; Presented by Harpreet Kaur and Eddie Scott	Ross Boatman (Harvey Monroe in EastEnders)	Paddy Bever (Max Turner in Coronation Street); Ross McLaren (Luca McIntyre in Doctors); Darcy Grey (Marcus Dean in Emmerdale); Matthew James-Bailey (Ethan Williams in Hollyoaks)
Best On-Screen Partnership; Presented by Esme Young and Patrick Grant	Lacey Turner and Gillian Wright (Stacey and Jean Slater in EastEnders)	David Neilson and Mollie Gallagher (Roy Cropper and Nina Lucas in Coronation Street); Chris Walker and Jan Pearson (Rob and Karen Hollins in Doctors); Isobel Steele and Bradley Johnson (Liv Flaherty and Vinny Dingle in Emmerdale); Anna Passey and Kieron Richardson (Sienna Blake and Ste Hay in Hollyoaks)
Best Single Episode; Presented by Martin Lewis	"Three Consultations and a Funeral" (Doctors)	"Flashback" (Coronation Street) "Jean in Southend" (EastEnders) "Marlon's Stroke" (Emmerdale) "Out of Time" (Hollyoaks)
Best Storyline; Presented by David James and Steven Bartlett	Misbah's Historic Rape (Hollyoaks)	Hate Crime (Coronation Street); Bear and his mother encounter racism at St Phil's Hospital (Doctors); Jean's Bipolar (EastEnders); Meena Serial Killer (Emmerdale)
Best Young Performer; Presented by Danya Griver and Ella Bright	Millie Gibson (Kelly Neelan in Coronation Street)	Sonny Kendall (Tommy Moon in EastEnders); Amelia Flanagan (April Windsor in Emmerdale); Jayden Fox (Bobby Costello in Hollyoaks)
Scene of the Year; Presented by Axel Blake	Misbah Didn't Consent (Hollyoaks)	Johnny's Death (Coronation Street); Mad Hatters Tea Party (Doctors); Hall of Mirrors (EastEnders); Bridge Collapse (Emmerdale)
Villain of the Year; Presented by Tommy Jessop and Gregory Piper	Maximus Evans (Corey Brent in Coronation Street)	Laura White (Princess Buchanan in Doctors); Toby-Alexander Smith (Gray Atkins in EastEnders); Paige Sandhu (Meena Jutla in Emmerdale); Rhiannon Clements (Summer Ranger in Hollyoaks)
Outstanding Achievement Award; Presented by Anita Dobson	Letitia Dean (Sharon Watts in EastEnders)	N/A
The Tony Warren Award; Presented by Connor McIntyre	Jan McVerry (Coronation Street writer)	N/A

==== 2023 ====
The 2023 ceremony took place on 3 June 2023 and aired on ITV on 6 June 2023 at 8pm. It was the first to be hosted by Jane McDonald.

The In memoriam segment paid tribute to Bill Treacher (Arthur Fowler in EastEnders), Dale Meeks (Simon Meredith in Emmerdale), Barbara Young (Barbara Platt and Doreen Fenwick in Coronation Street), Andy Devine (Shadrach Dingle in Emmerdale), Ernst Walder (Ivan Cheveski in Coronation Street), Peter Martin (Len Reynolds in Emmerdale), Mona Hammond (Blossom Jackson in EastEnders), Maria Charles (Lena Thistlewood in Coronation Street), Harry Landis (Felix Kawalski in EastEnders), and Paul O'Grady who hosted The British Soap Awards from 2004 to 2005.

This marked the last regular appearance of Doctors prior to the cancellation announcement by the BBC on 18 October of that year and Doctors will end production on 14 November 2024 after 24 years on air.

Award	Winners	Nominees
Best British Soap; Presented by Sheila Hancock	EastEnders	Coronation Street; Doctors; Emmerdale; Hollyoaks
Best Comedy Performance; Presented by Chris McCausland	Maureen Lipman (Evelyn Plummer in Coronation Street)	Ian Midlane (Al Haskey in Doctors); Jonny Freeman (Reiss Colwell in EastEnders); Samantha Giles (Bernice Blackstock in Emmerdale); Kieron Richardson (Ste Hay in Hollyoaks)
Best Dramatic Performance; Presented by James Cosmo	Charlotte Jordan (Daisy Midgeley in Coronation Street)	Chris Walker (Rob Hollins in Doctors); Danielle Harold (Lola Pearce-Brown in EastEnders); Jeff Hordley (Cain Dingle in Emmerdale); Nikki Sanderson (Maxine Minniver in Hollyoaks)
Best Family; Presented by Sue Jenkins, Dean Sullivan and Claire Sweeney	The Platts (Coronation Street)	The Millars (Doctors); The Slaters (EastEnders); The Dingles (Emmerdale); The McQueens (Hollyoaks)
Best Leading Performer; Presented by Susan Lynch	Danielle Harold (Lola Pearce-Brown in EastEnders)	Charlotte Jordan (Daisy Midgeley in Coronation Street); Shona McGarty (Whitney Dean in EastEnders); Dominic Brunt (Paddy Kirk in Emmerdale); Sally Dexter (Faith Dingle in Emmerdale)
Best Newcomer; Presented by Syabira Yusoff	Channique Sterling-Brown (Dee Dee Bailey in Coronation Street)	Kia Pegg (Scarlett Kiernan in Doctors); Aaron Thiara (Ravi Gulati in EastEnders); William Ash (Caleb Miligan in Emmerdale); Anya Lawrence (Vicky Grant in Hollyoaks)
Best On-Screen Partnership; Presented by Sam Quek and Ugo Monye	Jan Pearson and Chris Walker (Karen and Rob Hollins in Doctors)	David Neilson and Maureen Lipman (Roy Cropper and Evelyn Plummer in Coronation Street); Jamie Borthwick and Danielle Harold (Jay Brown and Lola Pearce-Brown in EastEnders); Mark Charnock and Dominic Brunt (Marlon Dingle and Paddy Kirk in Emmerdale); Richard Blackwood and Jamie Lomas (Felix Westwood and Warren Fox in Hollyoaks)
Best Single Episode; Presented by Scott Mills and Helen Skelton	"Acid Attack" (Coronation Street)	"Anything But Magnolia" and "If Wishes Were Horses" (Doctors) "Goodbye Dot" (EastEnders) "All Male Man Club" (Emmerdale) "Long Walk Home" (Hollyoaks)
Best Storyline; Presented by Shaun Dooley and Oliver Savell	Incel Eric Targets Mason and Maxine (Hollyoaks)	Daisy's Stalking Hell (Coronation Street); Valerie and the Forged Prescription (Doctors); Loving and Losing Lola (EastEnders); Paddy's Suicide Attempt (Emmerdale)
Best Young Performer; Presented by Alisha Weir	Lillia Turner (Lily Slater in EastEnders)	Jude Riordan (Sam Blakeman in Coronation Street); Huey Quinn (Kyle Winchester in Emmerdale); Jayden Fox (Bobby Costello in Hollyoaks)
Scene of the Year; Presented by The Vivienne	Acid Attack (Coronation Street)	Hell is Empty (Doctors); Whitney and Zack Say Goodbye to Peach (EastEnders); Paddy's Suicide Attempt (Emmerdale); Zoe Tells Abused Maxine "It's not your fault" (Hollyoaks)
Villain of the Year; Presented by Wilfred Webster	Aaron Thiara (Ravi Gulati in EastEnders)	Todd Boyce (Stephen Reid in Coronation Street); Laura White (Princess Buchanan in Doctors); Michael Wildman (Al Chapman in Emmerdale); Angus Castle-Doughty (Eric Foster in Hollyoaks)
Outstanding Achievement Award; Presented by Gemma Atkinson, Sheree Murphy and Verity Rushworth	Mark Charnock (Marlon Dingle in Emmerdale)	N/A
The Tony Warren Award; Presented by Amy Conachan	Peter Hunt (Hollyoaks casting director)	N/A

==== 2025 ====
The 2025 ceremony what would be the last ever ceremony took place on 31 May 2025 and will air on ITV on 5 June 2025 at 8pm. It was hosted by Jane McDonald.

Award	Winners	Nominees
Best British Soap; Presented by David Jason	EastEnders	Coronation Street; Emmerdale; Hollyoaks
Best Comedy Performance; Presented by Fay Ripley	Patsy Palmer (Bianca Jackson in EastEnders)	Jack P. Shepherd (David Platt in Coronation Street); Nicola Wheeler (Nicola King in Emmerdale); Nicole Barber-Lane (Myra McQueen in Hollyoaks)
Best Dramatic Performance; Presented by Angellica Bell and Danny Beard	Steve McFadden (Phil Mitchell in EastEnders)	Peter Ash (Paul Foreman in Coronation Street); Eden Taylor-Draper (Belle Dingle in Emmerdale); Isabelle Smith (Frankie Osborne in Hollyoaks)
Best Family; Presented by Kelvin, Liz and Marnie Fletcher	The Osbornes (Hollyoaks)	The Platts (Coronation Street); The Slaters (EastEnders); The Dingles (Emmerdale)
Best Leading Performer; Presented by Delta Goodrem	Lacey Turner (Stacey Slater in EastEnders)	Kellie Bright (Linda Carter in EastEnders); Beth Cordingly (Ruby Fox-Miligan in Emmerdale); Eden Taylor-Draper (Belle Dingle in Emmerdale)
Best Newcomer; Presented by Martin Kemp and Denise Welch	Isabelle Smith (Frankie Osborne in Hollyoaks)	Jacob Roberts (Kit Green in Coronation Street; Laura Doddington (Nicola Mitchell in EastEnders); Shebz Miah (Kammy Hadiq in Emmerdale)
Best On-Screen Partnership; Presented by Jan Pearson and Chris Walker	Rudolph Walker and Angela Wynter (Patrick and Yolande Trueman in EastEnders)	Alison King and Vicky Myers (Carla Connor and Lisa Swain in Coronation Street); William Ash and Beth Cordingly (Caleb Miligan and Ruby Fox-Miligan in Emmerdale; Nathaniel Dass and Oscar Curtis (Dillon Ray and Lucas Hay in Hollyoaks)
Best Single Episode; Presented by Patsy Kensit and Joe Absolom	"Phil's Psychosis: The Mitchells in 1985" (EastEnders)	"Mason's Death" (Coronation Street) "April's Life on the Streets" (Emmerdale) "Hollyoaks Time Jump" (Hollyoaks)
Best Storyline; Presented by Larry Lamb	Sibling Sexual Abuse (Hollyoaks)	Paul's Battle with MND (Coronation Street); Phil Mitchell: Hypermasculinity in Crisis (EastEnders); Belle & Tom: Domestic Abuse (Emmerdale)
Best Young Performer; Presented by Hattie Ryan and Karis Musongole	Amelia Flanagan (April Windsor in Emmerdale)	Will Flanagan (Joseph Brown in Coronation Street); Sonny Kendall (Tommy Moon in EastEnders); Noah Holdsworth (Oscar Osborne in Hollyoaks)
Scene of the Year; Presented by Tasha Ghouri and Richie Anderson	EastEnders at 40: Angie Watts' Shock Return (EastEnders)	Mason's Death – The Effects of Knife Crime (Coronation Street); Amy's Deathly Plunge Reveals a Grisly Secret (Emmerdale); Mercedes Confronts Her Mortality (Hollyoaks)
Villain of the Year; Presented by Emmett J. Scanlan	Navin Chowdhry (Nish Panesar in EastEnders)	Calum Lill (Joel Deering in Coronation Street); Ned Porteous (Joe Tate in Emmerdale); Tyler Conti (Abe Fielding in Hollyoaks)
Outstanding Achievement Award; Presented by Julie Hesmondhalgh	David Neilson (Roy Cropper in Coronation Street)	N/A
The Tony Warren Award; Presented by Natalie J Robb and Mark Charnock	Mike Plant (Emmerdale cameraman)	N/A

== Awards statistics ==
Key
- BR Brookside
- CO Coronation Street
- DO Doctors
- EE EastEnders
- EM Emmerdale
- FA Family Affairs
- HO Hollyoaks
- HA Home and Away
- ND Night and Day
- MS Multiple Soaps

Award	1999	2000	2001	2002	2003	2004	2005	2006	2007	2008	2009	2010	2011	2012	2013	2014	2015	2016	2017	2018	2019	2022	2023	2025
Best Actor	EE	EE	EE	EE	CO	EE	EE	EE	CO	HO	EE	EE	EM	EM	CO	CO	EE	EM	EM	CO	HO			
Best Actress	EE	EE	EE	EE	EE	CO	CO	EE	CO	HO	CO	EE	EE	CO	HO	CO	EE	EE	EM	CO	EM			
Best Bitch						CO	CO	EM																
Best British Soap	CO	EE	EE	EE	CO	EE	CO	EE	CO	EE	EE	EE	EE	EE	CO	HO	EE	EM	EM	CO	HO	EM	EE	EE
Best Comedy Performance	CO	CO	BR	CO	CO	HO	CO	EM	HO	CO	EE	CO	CO	CO	CO	CO	CO	CO	CO	DO	DO	EE	CO	EE
Best Dramatic Performance	EM	EE	CO	BR	CO	EM	FA	CO	EE	EE	DO	EE	CO	EE	CO	CO	EE					EM	CO	EE
Best Family																						EM	CO	HO
Best Female Dramatic Performance																		EE	CO	CO	EE			
Best Male Dramatic Performance																		EM	EM	HO	HO			
Best Exit	EM	EM	CO	EM	CO	EM	EE	EM	CO	HO	CO	EE	CO	CO	CO									
Best Foreign Soap	HA	HA																						
Best Leading Performer																						EM	EE	EE
Best Newcomer		HO	EE	EE	BR	EE	DO	EE	CO	CO	CO	EE	HO	CO	HO	EE	DO	EE	CO	EE	CO	EE	CO	HO
Best On-Screen Partnership	CO	BR	CO	EE	BR	CO	EE	CO	DO	HO	EE	DO	EE	EE	HO	CO	EE	CO	HO	HO	EE	EE	DO	EE
Best Single Episode			CO	EE	EM	DO	EM	EE	DO	EE	DO	EE	CO	CO	EM	CO	EE	DO	EM	HO	CO	DO	CO	EE
Best Storyline	EE	CO	CO	BR	CO	CO	FA	HO	CO	EE	DO	EE	CO	EM	CO	CO	EE	EE	EM	HO	CO	HO	HO	HO
Best Young Performer						EE	CO	HO	EM	EE	EE	DO	CO	EE	EM	HO	EM	HO	CO	EM	EE	CO	EE	EM
Villain of the Year	CO	EE	EE	EE	CO	EE	CO	EE	HO	CO	CO	EE	HO	CO	CO	HO	HO	CO	DO	CO	HO	CO	EE	EE
Hero of the Year			EM	ND	CO																			
Lifetime/Outstanding Achievement					BR	CO	EE	CO	EE	CO	EE	CO	CO	EE	EE	CO	CO	EE	HO	EE	CO	EE	EM	CO
Outstanding Achievement Off-Screen/Tony Warren Award																EE	EE	MS (Note: James Bain was a casting director who worked for both Coronation Street and Emmerdale.)	EE	CO	EM	CO	HO	EM
Sexiest Male	EE	EE	EE	EE	EE	EE	EE	CO	CO	CO	EE	EE	EE	EE	HO	HO								
Sexiest Female	EE	EE	EE	EE	EE	EE	HO	EE	HO	HO	CO	CO	CO	CO	CO	CO								
Special Achievement	CO		BR	EE		IN	CO	IN	EE	EM	CO	EM	EM	EE										
Scene of the Year/Spectacular Scene		BR	EM	HO	CO	EM	CO	EM	EM	HO	EM	HO	CO	EM	HO	EM	EM	EM	HO	MS (Note: In 2018, Doctors and EastEnders tied in the "Scene of the Year" award, so they both won.)	CO	HO	CO	EE
Greatest Moment																				EM				

Note: Crossroads was nominated from 2001 to 2003, but did not receive any awards. The "Best Foreign Soap" category also featured Neighbours, Sunset Beach and The Bold and the Beautiful in 1999.
