= British Soap Award for Best British Soap =

Annual British TV award

- Country: United Kingdom
- Presented by: The British Soap Awards
- First award: 1999
- Final award: 2025

Highlights
- Most awards: EastEnders (13)

The British Soap Award for Best British Soap was an award presented annually by the British Soap Awards. The award was voted for by the public. EastEnders is the most awarded soap in the category, with thirteen wins, as well as being the final soap to win the accolade.

== Winners and nominees ==
Year	Soap opera	Channel
1999	Coronation Street	ITV
1999	Brookside	Channel 4
1999	Emmerdale	ITV
1999	EastEnders	BBC One
1999	Family Affairs	Channel 5
1999	Hollyoaks	Channel 4
2000	EastEnders	BBC One
2000	Coronation Street	ITV
2000	Emmerdale	ITV
2001	EastEnders	BBC One
2001	Coronation Street	ITV
2001	Family Affairs	Channel 5
2001	Hollyoaks	Channel 4
2002	EastEnders	BBC One
2002	Coronation Street	ITV
2002	Crossroads	ITV
2002	Family Affairs	Channel 5
2002	Hollyoaks	Channel 4
2002	Night and Day	ITV
2003	Coronation Street	ITV
2003	Brookside	Channel 4
2003	Crossroads	ITV
2003	Doctors	BBC One
2003	EastEnders	BBC One
2003	Emmerdale	ITV
2003	Family Affairs	Channel 5
2003	Hollyoaks	Channel 4
2004	EastEnders	BBC One
2004	Coronation Street	ITV
2004	Doctors	BBC One
2004	Emmerdale	ITV
2004	Family Affairs	Channel 5
2004	Hollyoaks	Channel 4
2005	Coronation Street	ITV
2005	Doctors	BBC One
2005	EastEnders	BBC One
2005	Emmerdale	ITV
2005	Family Affairs	Channel 5
2005	Hollyoaks	Channel 4
2006	EastEnders	BBC One
2006	Coronation Street	ITV
2006	Doctors	BBC One
2006	Emmerdale	ITV
2006	Hollyoaks	Channel 4
2007	Coronation Street	ITV
2007	Doctors	BBC One
2007	EastEnders	BBC One
2007	Emmerdale	ITV
2007	Hollyoaks	Channel 4
2008	EastEnders	BBC One
2008	Coronation Street	ITV
2008	Doctors	BBC One
2008	Emmerdale	ITV
2008	Hollyoaks	Channel 4
2009	EastEnders	BBC One
2009	Coronation Street	ITV
2009	Doctors	BBC One
2009	Emmerdale	ITV
2009	Hollyoaks	Channel 4
2010	EastEnders	BBC One
2010	Coronation Street	ITV
2010	Doctors	BBC One
2010	Emmerdale	ITV
2010	Hollyoaks	Channel 4
2011	EastEnders	BBC One
2011	Coronation Street	ITV
2011	Doctors	BBC One
2011	Emmerdale	ITV
2011	Hollyoaks	Channel 4
2012	EastEnders	BBC One
2012	Coronation Street	ITV
2012	Doctors	BBC One
2012	Emmerdale	ITV
2012	Hollyoaks	Channel 4
2013	Coronation Street	ITV
2013	Doctors	BBC One
2013	EastEnders	BBC One
2013	Emmerdale	ITV
2013	Hollyoaks	Channel 4
2014	Hollyoaks	Channel 4
2014	Coronation Street	ITV
2014	Doctors	BBC One
2014	EastEnders	BBC One
2014	Emmerdale	ITV
2015	EastEnders	BBC One
2015	Coronation Street	ITV
2015	Doctors	BBC One
2015	Emmerdale	ITV
2015	Hollyoaks	Channel 4
2016	Emmerdale	ITV
2016	Coronation Street	ITV
2016	Doctors	BBC One
2016	EastEnders	BBC One
2016	Hollyoaks	Channel 4
2017	Emmerdale	ITV
2017	Coronation Street	ITV
2017	Doctors	BBC One
2017	EastEnders	BBC One
2017	Hollyoaks	Channel 4
2018	Coronation Street	ITV
2018	Doctors	BBC One
2018	EastEnders	BBC One
2018	Emmerdale	ITV
2018	Hollyoaks	Channel 4
2019	Hollyoaks	Channel 4
2019	Coronation Street	ITV
2019	Doctors	BBC One
2019	EastEnders	BBC One
2019	Emmerdale	ITV
2022	Emmerdale	ITV
2022	Coronation Street	ITV
2022	Doctors	BBC One
2022	EastEnders	BBC One
2022	Hollyoaks	Channel 4
2023	EastEnders	BBC One
2023	Coronation Street	ITV
2023	Doctors	BBC One
2023	Emmerdale	ITV
2023	Hollyoaks	Channel 4
2025	EastEnders	BBC One
2025	Coronation Street	ITV
2025	Emmerdale	ITV
2025	Hollyoaks	Channel 4

== Wins and nominations by soap ==
Soap opera	Wins	Nominations (Note: These nominations did not result in a win.)
EastEnders	13	11
Coronation Street	6	18
Emmerdale	3	19
Hollyoaks	2	21
Doctors	0	19
Family Affairs	0	6
Brookside	0	2
Crossroads	0	2
Night and Day	0	1
