= 12th National Television Awards =

British awards ceremony in 2006

- Date: 1 November 2006
- Location: Royal Albert Hall, London
- Country: United Kingdom
- Presented by: Various
- Hosted by: Trevor McDonald
- Website: http://www.nationaltvawards.com/

Television/radio coverage
- Network: ITV
- Runtime: 120 minutes

The 12th National Television Awards ceremony was held at the Royal Albert Hall on 1 November 2006 and was hosted by Sir Trevor McDonald.

== Awards ==
Category	Winner	Also nominated
Most Popular Actor; Presented by Dame Julie Andrews	David Tennant (Doctor Who)	Bradley Walsh (Coronation Street); Ross Kemp (EastEnders); Chris Fountain (Hollyoaks); Matthew Fox (Lost)
Most Popular Actress; Presented by John Savident	Billie Piper (Doctor Who)	Sue Cleaver (Coronation Street); Lacey Turner (EastEnders); Ursula Holden-Gill (Emmerdale); Evangeline Lilly (Lost)
Most Popular Drama	Doctor Who (BBC One)	Bad Girls (ITV); Desperate Housewives (Channel 4/ABC); Lost (Channel 4/ABC)
Most Popular Serial Drama; Presented by Peter Andre and Katie Price	EastEnders (BBC One)	Coronation Street (ITV); Emmerdale (ITV); Hollyoaks (Channel 4)
Most Popular Entertainment Programme; Presented by Taťána Kuchařová	The X Factor (ITV)	Ant & Dec's Saturday Night Takeaway (ITV); Dancing on Ice (ITV); Friday Night with Jonathan Ross (BBC One); Strictly Come Dancing (BBC One)
Most Popular Reality Programme; Presented by Jack and Kelly Osbourne	Big Brother (Channel 4)	Celebrity Big Brother (Channel 4); I'm a Celebrity... Get Me Out of Here! (ITV); The Apprentice (BBC Two)
Most Popular Entertainment Presenter; Presented by Louisa Lytton and Vincent Simone	Ant & Dec (Ant & Dec's Saturday Night Takeaway)	Davina McCall (Big Brother); Jonathan Ross (Friday Night with Jonathan Ross); Noel Edmonds (Deal or No Deal); Paul O'Grady (The New Paul O'Grady Show)
Most Popular Daytime Programme; Presented by Boris Johnson	Deal or No Deal (Channel 4)	Neighbours (BBC One/Network Ten); The New Paul O'Grady Show (Channel 4); This Morning (ITV)
Most Popular TV Contender; Presented by Michael Barrymore	Nikki Grahame (Big Brother)	Carol Thatcher (I'm a Celebrity... Get Me Out of Here!); Chantelle Houghton (Celebrity Big Brother); Pete Bennett (Big Brother); Richard Fleeshman (Soapstar Superstar)
Most Popular Quiz Programme; Presented by Sophie and Kirstie Allsopp	Ant & Dec's Gameshow Marathon (ITV)	8 Out of 10 Cats (Channel 4); Have I Got News for You (BBC One); Who Wants to Be a Millionaire? (ITV)
Most Popular Comedy Programme; Presented by David Schwimmer	Little Britain (BBC One)	My Family (BBC One); The Catherine Tate Show (BBC Two); Will & Grace (Channel 4/NBC)
Most Popular Factual Programme	Top Gear (BBC Two)	Bad Lads Army: Officer Class (ITV); Planet Earth (BBC One); Supernanny (Channel 4)
Most Popular Newcomer	Charlie Clements (EastEnders)	Nikki Patel (Coronation Street); Jenna-Louise Coleman (Emmerdale); Andrew Moss (Hollyoaks)
TV Landmark Award	David Walliams	
Special Recognition Award; Presented by Terri Irwin and Sir Trevor McDonald	Sir David Attenborough	
