= List of Emmerdale characters introduced in 2022 =

Emmerdale is a British soap opera first broadcast on 16 October 1972. The following is a list of characters that first appeared during 2022, by order of first appearance. All characters are introduced by the soap's executive producer, Jane Hudson. Marcus Dean (Darcy Grey) in February as the son of Pierce Harris (Jonathan Wrather). He was followed by Mary Goskirk (Louise Jameson), the mother of Rhona (Zoë Henry), in March. That same month, Martelle Edinborough debuted as Suzy Merton, a love interest for Vanessa Woodfield (Michelle Hardwick). Karene Peter then debuted in June as Naomi Walters, the daughter of Charles Anderson (Kevin Mathurin). Then, in December, Lewis Cope joined as Nicky. He was followed by William Ash, who joined as Caleb Miligan, the half-brother of Cain Dingle (Jeff Hordley) and Chas Dingle (Lucy Pargeter). Additionally, multiple other characters appeared in 2022.

== Marcus Dean ==
Marcus Dean, played by Darcy Grey, made his first appearance on 3 February 2022. He was introduced as the son of established former character Pierce Harris (Jonathan Wrather), who is in prison due to murdering Graham Foster (Andrew Scarborough). Justin Harp of Digital Spy wrote that Marcus arrives in the fictional village with his own traumatic experiences from living with Pierce, who abused his mother. Harp wrote that Marcus shares numerous traits with Pierce, such as his brooding, suaveness and good looks. He also questioned whether Marcus would share Pierce's violent attributes. Grey later said that Marcus believes he is not like Pierce, but as his storylines evolve, he shares more similarities to Pierce. Producer Kate Brooks said that Marcus' arrival will "ruffle a few feathers and flutter a few hearts in the village" and confirmed that viewers would soon realise that he is more than the son of Pierce.

== Mary Goskirk ==
Mary Goskirk, played by Louise Jameson, made her first appearance on 7 March 2022. She was introduced as the mother of established character of Rhona (Zoë Henry), whom she has a "strained relationship" with. Mary was described by Digital Spy's Hannah Bird as a "no nonsense" character and noted that Rhona feels as though she can never live up to her expectations. However, due to Marcus Dean's (Darcy Grey) arrival in the village causing upset for Rhona due to his connection to her rapist, Bird felt that Mary's arrival in the village could be "the prime opportunity for them to build bridges and heal their relationship". Her arrival initially unsettles Rhona as she feels there is a hidden agenda and treats her with suspicion, while other villagers "welcome her with open arms, finding her wit endearing". Bird hinted that despite her likeability in the village, it would not be long before she had arguments with villagers.

On joining Emmerdale, Jameson said: "It feels like such a gift to be welcomed into the Emmerdale cast. Playing Zoe's on-screen mum is the icing on the cake." Producer Laura Shaw was thrilled to welcome Jameson into the cast, noting that her experience in the industry would be "a fabulous asset to the show". On the character, Shaw added that she is intelligent, witty and complex and that for Rhona, "there won't ever be a dull moment whilst her domineering mother is around". Metro's Sabrina Barr wrote that Mary has a bold persona as she's "quick-witted and headstrong". Barr also confirmed Rhona's suspicions about Mary by revealing that Mary does have a hidden reason for her move to the village. She also noted Jameson's former experience on the soap, having played Sharon Crossthwaite in 1973, a cousin of Annie Sugden (Sheila Mercier).

Soon into her arrival, she strikes up a friendship with Kim Tate (Claire King) and their pairing has been well-received by critics and viewers. Mary's vulnerable side was explored when she confides in Kim about being a lesbian. Jameson was shocked that writers had made Mary a late life lesbian, but was happy to be part of the representation. Later storylines have seen Mary begin dating Faye Helders (Jane Gurnett), who cons Mary and releases revenge porn of her. She initially struggles with the events, but is inspired when April Windsor (Amelia Flanagan) wants to become a journalist like her. Viewers were initially wary of Mary's intentions upon her arrival, but quickly into her tenure, she was dubbed a fan favourite whose wit and nerve was found entertaining.

== Gail Hancock ==
Gail Hancock, played by Elizabeth Boag, a nurse who takes care of Marlon Dingle (Mark Charnock) when he suffers a stroke. She appeared in 13 episodes between 22 March and 25 April 2022. Despite her short stint, her character had an impact on viewers shortly after her arrival and the character received praise. Gail departed on 25 April 2022 and Boag announced her departure on Twitter the following day: "Bye Gail! Thank you @markcharnock, @ZoeHenry03, all the cast, crew and casting team @ emmerdale. Loved every minute!". Charnock, who plays Marlon also praised Boag by saying "You were wonderful in the part, Liz! Just superb."

== Suzy Merton ==
Suzy Merton, played by Martelle Edinborough, made her first appearance on 30 March 2022 and last in February 2025. She was introduced as a love interest for Vanessa Woodfield (Michelle Hardwick) On her casting on the soap, Edinborough said: "My feet haven't quite touched the ground yet, I'm still on this massive cloud high up in the sky, but it's been going really, really good. It's just like a family, and it sounds so cliché but it really is and everyone is so lovely and welcoming and helps you settle in really nicely." Edinborough felt that especially due to being from Leeds, where Emmerdale is filmed, the job was perfect for her.

== Jordan Greenlow ==
Jordan Greenlow, played by Jack Parr, is a man who Ethan Anderson (Emile John) is called to represent after he is arrested for assault. He made his first appearance on 28 April 2022. Parr's casting was announced on 19 April 2022 and his character would be part of a "dramatic" storyline where his character would become a "divisive figure in the village." Lauren Morris from Radio Times suggested that Jordan's arrival would be "shocking" and "dramatic", with the storyline portraying a "serious issue". Ethan's representation of Jordan causes a conflict of interest as it is revealed that the victim is one of Ethan’s neighbours, Billy Fletcher (Jay Kontzle), who claims that the attack was racially motivated.

== Callum Matthews ==
Callum Matthews
- Emmerdale character
- Portrayed by: Tom Ashley
- Duration: 2022–2023
- First appearance: Episode 9355/6; 5 May 2022
- Last appearance: Episode 9627/8; 16 March 2023
- Introduced by: Jane Hudson
In-universe information
- Occupation: Drug Dealer

Callum Matthews, played by Tom Ashley, was Leyla Cavanagh (Roxy Shahidi)'s drug dealer, who first appeared on 5 May 2022. He arrives when he asks Leyla to store some cocaine for her as a favour as she couldn't pay funds to buy some for her own use. He appeared on a recurring basis until August 2022. Callum returned in January 2023, when he paid Leyla to store a bag of drugs for him. After her son, Jacob Gallagher (Joe-Warren Plant), learns of her addiction, he arranges to meet Callum with a knife, however Callum grabs hold of his knife and stabs Jacob. He is later arrested, but released on bail takes Leyla, Jacob and Suzy Merton (Martelle Edinborough) hostage with a gun, but is eventually caught by the police.

Shahidi, who plays Leyla commented: "Leyla experiences guilt and fear when Suzy is attacked. She blames herself because Suzy has stepped in to save the mess that Leyla had created. [She] sees the reality and the lengths that Callum will go to - [he] is willing to endanger their lives and potentially end them, so her fear goes through the roof."

== Kit ==
Christopher "Kit", played by Thoren Ferguson, is Marlon Dingle's (Mark Charnock) physiotherapist that helps him in his recovery following his stroke. He appeared between 19 May 2022 and 26 August 2022. During his time in the village, he embarks on a relationship with Laurel Thomas (Charlotte Bellamy). Whilst they are seeing each other, Kit arranges a date with Gabby Thomas (Rosie Bentham), who, unbeknownst to him, is Laurel's stepdaughter. He uses the alias "Chris" and he and Gabby are eventually caught by Laurel, and they both realise that he has been seeing them both. When Laurel's ex-partner Jai Sharma (Chris Bisson) discovers this, he punches Kit, who eventually leaves the village, and quits as Marlon's therapist, leaving him disappointed. Laura-Jayne Tyler from Inside Soap joked, "Hmm. Marlon's physio Kit is just calling out for some memorable rhyming nickname. If only we could think of one."

== Jason Denshaw ==
Jason Denshaw, played by former Hollyoaks actor Parry Glasspool, is the former drug dealer of Jai Sharma (Chris Bisson) who sells cocaine to Leyla Cavanagh (Roxy Shahidi). Glasspool's casting was announced on 28 May 2022, and was announced to appear as part of an ongoing storyline between Leyla and her friend Suzy Merton (Martelle Edinborough). He appears between 3-26 June 2022. He attempts to blackmail Leyla and Suzy into allowing him to sell drugs to their clients. Suzy then records him and informs him that if he attempts to blackmail him again, she will go to the police with her recording, incriminating him with his drug dealing business. He then leaves the pair alone. Craig Jones from Leeds Live said: "soapland is a small place".

== Colin Hamston ==
Colin Hamston
- Emmerdale character
- Portrayed by: Mark Noble
- Duration: 2022–2023
- First appearance: Episode 9381; 6 June 2022
- Last appearance: Episode 9752/3; 10 August 2023
- Introduced by: Jane Hudson
In-universe information
- Occupation: Councillor
- Wife: Rachel Hamston (backstory)
- Sons: Marshall Hamston

Colin Hamston, played by Mark Noble, was a local councillor and the homophobic father of Marshall Hamston (Max Fletcher), who first appeared in June for four episodes, but then returned again in January 2023, when Marshall was first introduced. When Marshall comes out as gay, Colin's homophobic views make him disgusted in his son. After he befriended Arthur Thomas (Alfie Clarke), he sends him to boarding school, but after he comes home, Colin isolates and abuses him physically and emotionally. Laurel Thomas (Charlotte Bellamy), Arthur's mother, forces her way into their family home and takes Marshall with her, as well as threatening Colin that if he tries to get to Marshall again, she will report and expose him.

After Marshall moves away to live with his Aunt Jean, the storyline takes a "disturbing turn of events". Colin demands for his whereabouts and even holds Laurel captive in his home, which leads to his later arrest after being exposed publicly for the bigot he really was. Justin Harp from Digital Spy described these scenes to be "disturbing".

== Naomi Walters ==
Naomi Walters, played by Karene Peter, made her first uncredited appearance on 14 June 2022, with her first credited appearance airing on 5 July 2022. She was introduced as the daughter of Charles (Kevin Mathurin) and Esme (Eva Fontaine), and the younger sister of Ethan (Emile John). Naomi was initially referenced on the soap in October 2021 when Esme mentions her to Charles. Her backstory involves being put up for adoption by Esme, who was cheated on by Charles and suffered from postpartum depression. Esme and Naomi later met up, but Charles had refused to meet her. When Charles learns that Naomi has gone missing, he feels responsible for her disappearance so he hunts for her. He discovers her working in a bar, arguing with her boss. Charles defends her in the argument and knocks her boss over.

Her first major storyline sees her involved in an attack against village local Nicola King (Nicola Wheeler). The reaction from locals sees her ostracised, but despite their distaste for her, Naomi's characterisation remains bolshy and argumentative. Throughout her tenure, Naomi is shown to be a feisty, stubborn and strong-willed character. She has various feuds, including spats with her family, Manpreet Sharma (Rebecca Sarker), Rhona Goskirk (Zoë Henry) and her bosses at the Woolpack. She is also conned by Alex Moore (Liam Boyle), which shows a vulnerable side to Naomi when she is devastated by his lies. Peter announced her decision to leave Emmerdale in April 2023, with her exit set to air in July 2023. Viewers were not a fan of Naomi, with many being unappreciative of her nasty nature. However, Metro writer Sue Haasler appreciated that she is "a headstrong young woman who insists on making her own decisions in life".

On 25 April 2023, a day after the casting announcement of Naomi's grandmother Claudette (Flo Wilson), it was announced that Peter had quit her role as Naomi. A spokesperson said that Peter had enjoyed her time on Emmerdale, but due to wanting to play different roles, she had made the decision to leave. Radio Times reported that her exit would be set to air in summer 2023. After her short but "eventful" tenure on the soap, it was confirmed that her exit would be written in a way that could accommodate her return in the future.

== Terry Pickforth ==
Terry Pickforth, portrayed by Neil Bell, was an acquaintance of Sandra Flaherty (Joanne Mitchell) whom she owed £4000 to. He made his first appearance on 12 July 2022. Craig Jones from Leeds Live described Terry's character to be a "sinister role". Many fans recognised Bell from ITV soap opera Coronation Street when he first appeared. This was his second role in Emmerdale, as he had played a person in a bar in December 2009. Jones also commented: "soapland is a small place with acting stars regularly switching from programme to programme."

== Clemmie Reed ==
Clemmie Reed
- Emmerdale character
- Portrayed by: Mabel Addison
- Duration: 2022–present
- First appearance: Episode 9414/5; 14 July 2022
- Introduced by: Steve Frost
In-universe information
- Father: Alex Moore
- Mother: Beth Reed
- Adoptive father: Billy Fletcher (guardian)
- Adoptive mother: Dawn Taylor (guardian)
- Brothers: Evan Fletcher (adoptive)
- Half-brothers: Lucas Taylor
- Grandfathers: Will Taylor (adoptive)
- Grandmothers: Rose Jackson (adoptive)

Clementine "Clemmie" Reed, portrayed by Mabel Addison is the daughter of Dawn Fletcher (Olivia Bromley)'s friend Beth and her ex-boyfriend Alex Moore (Liam Boyle). After Beth died, Dawn finds Clemmie sleeping in a dog basket in a friend's kitchen, which leads to her taking her home to care for her. After noticing a resemblance of her own son Lucas Taylor (Dexter Anstell), he realises that her ex-boyfriend and Lucas' father, Alex is also Clemmie's father. Dawn and her husband Billy Fletcher (Jay Kontzle) visit Alex, who is in prison, to tell him they are going for guardianship of Clemmie.

In 2023, going through social services, the fostering of Clemmie becomes official in court at the same time as Billy's adoption of Lucas. However, a few months later, Dawn discovers that she's pregnant, which Gabby Thomas (Rosie Bentham) reveals out loud at Home Farm, which Clemmie hears and causes her to feel unwanted and run away, however Nicky Miligan (Lewis Cope) finds and brings her home, making him hero of the hour, to Gabby's dismay due to him recently jilting him before their wedding.

== Esther Spencer ==
Esther Spencer
- Emmerdale character
- Portrayed by: Florence Mae Dyson (2022–2024); Ella Kenny (2024)
- Duration: 2022–2024
- First appearance: Episode 9499/9500; 20 October 2022
- Last appearance: Episode 10,196; 20 December 2024
- Introduced by: Steve Frost
In-universe information
- Father: Samson Dingle
- Mother: Amelia Spencer
- Grandfathers: Sam Dingle; Daz Spencer; Dan Spencer (adoptive)
- Grandmothers: Alice Dingle; Ali Spencer; Lydia Dingle (step)
- Uncles: Sean Spencer
- Other relatives: Charity Dingle; Noah Dingle; Chas Dingle; Aaron Dingle; Shadrach Dingle; Marlon Dingle; Moses Dingle; Sarah Sugden; Nate Robinson; Kyle Winchester; Isaac Dingle; Belle Dingle; Cain Dingle; Zak Dingle

Esther Spencer is the daughter of Amelia Spencer (Daisy Campbell) and Samson Dingle (Sam Hall). She was born when her parents are 16 years old. Amelia discovered she was pregnant when she collapsed holding Thomas Tate (Bertie Brotherton) and went into hospital. When she discovered her pregnancy, she originally planned to have an abortion, but Charity Dingle (Emma Atkins) convinced her not to outside of the clinic. People originally believed that Noah Dingle (Jack Downham) was the father, but it was later revealed to be Samson, who was far from pleased. Later, Noah and Amelia begin a relationship, but Samson does everything he can to get Esther out of his life when she was born. First, he called social services reporting Amelia as an unfit parent and then cons Noah out of the savings that his aunt, Zoe Tate (Leah Bracknell) kept for him, in order to remain a part of Esther's life.

On 5 December 2024, it was announced that Mark Jordon would reprise the role of Daz Spencer as part of Amelia's exit storyline. Digital Spy revealed details that Amelia would go and live with Daz in Leicester, taking Esther with her for a new life.

== Darren Walker ==
Darren Walker, portrayed by Kyle Pryor, made his first appearance on 7 December 2022 when he meets with Kim Tate (Claire King) to discuss the set up of her new stud farm. Darren impresses Kim, until Dawn Fletcher (Olivia Bromley) reveals that he has lied about his contacts. Pryor's casting was announced on 29 November 2022. His character is a businessman, who was billed as a "stylish charmer". He also beats up Vinny Dingle (Bradley Johnson) after he believes he cheated at playing poker with him, before taking back his money.

== Nicky Miligan ==
Nicky Miligan
- Emmerdale character
- Portrayed by: Lewis Cope
- Duration: 2022–2024
- First appearance: Episode 9540; 14 December 2022
- Last appearance: Episode 10,030/31; 4 July 2024
- Introduced by: Jane Hudson
In-universe information
- Father: Caleb Miligan
- Mother: Ruby Fox-Miligan
- Half-sisters: Steph Miligan
- Grandfathers: Frank Tate; Anthony Fox
- Grandmothers: Faith Dingle; Helen Fox
- Uncles: Liam Hammond; Chris Tate; Cain Dingle; Jamie Tate
- Aunts: Zoe Tate; Chas Dingle; Steph Miligan
- First cousins: Debbie Dingle; Nate Robinson; Aaron Dingle; Joe Tate; Jean Tate; Noah Dingle; Kyle Dingle; Isaac Dingle; Millie Tate; Grace Dingle; Eve Dingle; Thomas Tate

Nicky Miligan, played by Lewis Cope, first appeared on 14 December 2022. He was introduced as a male nanny who attends an interview for a job caring for Gabby Thomas (Rosie Bentham) and Dawn Fletcher's (Olivia Bromley) children at Home Farm. Nicky and Gabby are shown to be attracted to each other and he eventually stops working as her nanny so that they can pursue a relationship. In spite of Kim Tate's (Claire King) disapproval for their relationship, he proposes to Gabby and she accepts.

In April 2023, in an unannounced twist, it is revealed that Nicky is son of Caleb Miligan (William Ash), and the grandson of Frank Tate (Norman Bowler) and Faith Dingle (Sally Dexter). In an interview with Digital Spy, Cope said that he did not know about the twist. He explained: "I thought I was coming in as a love interest to Gabby. It was further down the line I got the scripts and it started to reveal itself for me. It was a nice surprise as I wasn't pre-empting anything. I could just look at what was on the script and make that work." Cope was excited for viewers to see the pair working together to take over Home Farm.

== Caleb Miligan ==
Caleb Miligan
- Emmerdale character
- Portrayed by: William Ash; Riccardo Drayton (flashback)
- Duration: 2022–present
- First appearance: Episode 9555/56; 25 December 2022
- Introduced by: Jane Hudson
In-universe information
- Father: Frank Tate
- Mother: Faith Dingle
- Stepmother: Kim Tate
- Half-brothers: Liam Hammond; Chris Tate; Cain Dingle; Jamie Tate
- Half-sisters: Zoe Tate; Chas Dingle
- Wife: Ruby Fox-Miligan
- Sons: Nicky Miligan
- Adoptive daughters: Steph Miligan
- Nephews: Nate Robinson; Aaron Dingle; Joe Tate; Noah Dingle; Kyle Dingle; Isaac Dingle; Thomas Tate
- Nieces: Debbie Dingle; Jean Tate; Millie Tate; Grace Dingle; Eve Dingle

Caleb Miligan, played by William Ash, made his first appearance on 25 December 2022. The character and Ash's casting details were announced on 26 November 2022. Of his casting, Ash stated "I'm thrilled to be joining such an iconic show. Emmerdale is packed full of fantastic actors and I'm really looking forward to working alongside them. Caleb is a fantastically complex character and I can't wait to get stuck in." Caleb is introduced as the long-lost brother of Cain (Jeff Hordley) and Chas Dingle (Lucy Pargeter), and the estranged son of Faith Dingle (Sally Dexter), who died from breast cancer before his arrival. His presence causes issues between Cain and Chas, as she learns that Cain knew about Caleb and kept him a secret from her. Caleb was billed as "calm and in control, rich and successful, at first glance Caleb is everything his brother isn't, but will the pair find they have more in common than they thought?" It was also teased that Caleb's arrival would "shake things up" for the Dingle family.

Caleb spends months becoming a business partner of Kim Tate (Claire King). Then in April 2023, in an unannounced twist, Caleb was revealed to be the son of Kim's first husband, Frank Tate (Norman Bowler). Caleb is also the father of Nicky (Lewis Cope), who had also spent months getting close to Gabby Thomas (Rosie Bentham). It was confirmed that both Caleb and Nicky had got close to Kim and Gabby in a bid to take Home Farm over. Ash knew about the storyline since his casting and was excited for viewers to discover the truth. He was also excited for the storyline to cause further disruption between the Tate and Dingle families due to their long-running feud in the soap.

== Other characters ==
Character	Episode date(s)	Actor	Circumstances
Cassie	11–13 January	Stephanie Dooley	An unhappy client of Take a Vow. Wedding planner Priya Sharma (Fiona Wade) helps Cassie with her problems but the stress causes Priya to scratch her scars caused by getting caught in a fire; Priya later overhears Cassie mocking her scratching.
Tommy (Note: Tommy is initially credited as "Truck Driver".)	13–27 January	Martin Mednikarov	A truck driver who picks up Meena Jutla (Paige Sandhu) and gives her a lift to Glasgow. Unbeknownst to him, Meena has murdered numerous people and is using him as a getaway driver to escape the police. He lives with her for a few weeks, after which she leaves him.
Solicitor	18–22 February	Olu Adaeze	Meena Jutla's (Paige Sandhu) solicitor when she is arrested for her various crimes.
Defence Barrister Milligan	17 March–18 April	Amy Robbins	The defence barrister at Meena Jutla's (Paige Sandhu) plea hearing.
Judge Stevenson	17 March–18 April	Andrew Readman	The judge who presides over Meena Jutla's (Paige Sandhu) court trial.
Prosecution Barrister Sinclair	17 March–18 April	Clarence Smith	A lawyer at Meena Jutla's (Paige Sandhu) court trial.
Prison Officer Beeker	4–14 April	Dean Smith	A prison officer who Meena Jutla (Paige Sandhu) charms whilst in her cell. After flirting with him, Beeker brings her chocolate and a newspaper with a story about her crimes on the front page. Prior to her trial, Meena asks him to unlock a door that would allow her to escape, but he does not comply with her request.
Court Reporter	15 April	Anita Ramdharry	A news reporter who covers Meena Jutla's (Paige Sandhu) crimes and court trial.
Prison Officer	15 April	Anna Tolputt	A prison officer who is threatened by Meena Jutla (Paige Sandhu) after she takes away access to Meena's television in her prison cell.
Bar Manager	5 July	Leon Cooke	Naomi Walters' (Karene Peter) manager who reprimands her for talking to her friends whilst on a shift. Naomi quits and he tries to stop her from leaving due to being short-staffed. When Charles Anderson (Kevin Mathurin) sees him stopping Naomi, Charles intervenes and punches him. He calls the police but later decides not to press charges against Charles.
