= Mary Goskirk =

Fictional character from Emmerdale

- Emmerdale character
- Portrayed by: Louise Jameson
- Duration: 2022–present
- First appearance: Episode 9304; 7 March 2022
- Introduced by: Jane Hudson
In-universe information
- Occupation: Journalist
- Husband: Barry Goskirk (backstory)
- Daughters: Rhona Goskirk
- Grandsons: Leo Goskirk
- Granddaughters: Ivy Malcolms

Mary Goskirk is a fictional character from the ITV soap opera Emmerdale, played by Louise Jameson. Mary was introduced as the mother of established character Rhona Goskirk (Zoë Henry), with whom she shares a strained relationship with upon arrival. Upon her casting, Jameson immediately asked writers not to stereotype Mary into being a typical old woman. She was impressed by their response, as they had already planned for her to be a feisty, domineering, narcissistic woman who challenges people. Jameson has said that she plans to be on Emmerdale for a three to four-year stint.

Soon into her arrival, she strikes up a friendship with Kim Tate (Claire King) and their pairing has been well received by critics and viewers. Mary's vulnerable side was explored when she confides in Kim about being a lesbian. Jameson was shocked that writers had made Mary a late life lesbian, but was happy to be part of the representation. Later storylines have seen Mary begin dating Faye Helders (Jane Gurnett), who cons Mary and releases revenge porn of her. She initially struggles with the events, but is inspired when April Windsor (Amelia Flanagan) wants to become a journalist like her. Viewers were initially wary of Mary's intentions upon her arrival, but quickly into her tenure, she was dubbed a fan favourite whose wit and nerve was found entertaining.

== Casting and characterisation ==
On 29 January 2022, it was announced that the mother of established character Rhona Goskirk (Zoë Henry) had been cast on Emmerdale, with Louise Jameson cast in the role. Jameson appeared in Emmerdale previously in 1973 as Sharon Crossthwaite, an unrelated character. Jameson described her casting as a gift and said that playing Henry's on-screen mother was "the icing on the cake". When she was cast, she headed to the producers to say: "don't give me a cardigan and a zimmer frame because I'm 70", wanting a more complex character to play. They delighted Jameson by informing her of their plans for Mary, a woman who was billed as a domineering, feisty and "no-nonsense character" with a sharp wit and stubbornness that would challenge Rhona and other villagers. She is a well-travelled person who is "free-flowing and bohemian". Producers were excited to have cast Jameson on Emmerdale due to her breadth of acting experience and said that there would not "ever be a dull moment" with Mary around. Jameson plans to stay in the role for a three to four-year stint.

At a press event, Jameson billed Mary as "incredibly tactless and very opinionated" but noted that Mary sees herself as a generous person. She gives backhanded compliments that come from genuine feelings; Jameson admitted that Mary suffers slightly from narcissistic personality disorder since she relates other people's actions back to herself. Mary is not neutral on situations and has an opinion about everything since she believes she has a lot to offer, expecting people to like her. However, Jameson admitted that other people would prefer for her to stop interfering. Despite Mary's initial scenes, Jameson argued that Mary was not just a one-dimensional character that has smart one-liners. She described Mary as "a really feisty matriarch" who cares deeply about people and said that Mary loves a lot. She added: "one minute you wish she'd shut her mouth as she doesn't censor herself, and the next she'll be adorable and kind. Mary is like an onion, peel off another layer and there's something else to discover."

== Development ==
=== Introduction and making amends with Rhona ===
Mary's introduction to Emmerdale was topical and was written to highlight the loneliness people felt during the COVID-19 pandemic. She arrives after realising how lonely she has become through lockdown, having realised the importance of family and wanting to make amends. In a "beautifully written scene", Mary confides in Rhona about a friend that died of COVID without Mary getting to say goodbye. She feels that her loneliness has become dark and is destroying her soul, explaining her reason for arriving in the village.

Upon Mary's introduction, she "bursts onto the scene at a critical point in her daughter's life" since Rhona is dealing with memories of her rapist, Pierce Harris (Jonathan Wrather). It transpires that Mary and Rhona share a strained relationship due to Rhona feeling like she has never been good enough for her mother. However, Digital Spy noted that Mary arriving at the time of Rhona's struggles could benefit their relationship, serving as an opportunity for them to bond.

Rhona is preparing to propose to partner Marlon Dingle (Mark Charnock), who has recently had a stroke prior to Mary's arrival. It becomes clear to Mary that Rhona has taken on a lot by caring for Marlon and his daughter, April Windsor (Amelia Flanagan), as well as her own son, Leo Goskirk (Harvey Rogerson). Mary confides in Faith Dingle (Sally Dexter) about her worries regarding Rhona. Mary enjoys having a new friend to talk to due to having been so lonely over recent years; she also bonds with Faith since they both have experiences with dysfunctional families and are of a similar age. Rhona walks in on them talking and Mary suggests a separation, and "appalled at her mother's insensitivity", she throws Mary out.

=== Coming out as a lesbian ===
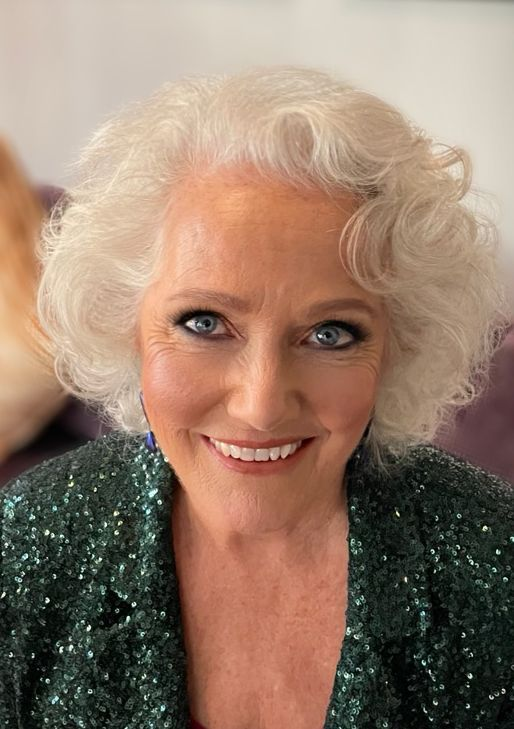
Jameson was shocked that Mary is a late in life lesbian.

Writers lined up a "surprise friendship" between Mary and established character Kim Tate (Claire King). Jameson said that she was a fan of the friendship since they had paired two strong women together. Scenes see Mary become evasive when Kim asks about her love life, which concerns Kim since Mary is open about everything else. She then comes out as a lesbian to Kim and tells her about her lost love, Louise, the woman whom she claimed was her dead friend to Rhona. Jameson was surprised that Mary had been written as a late in life lesbian and thought that the audience would be similarly surprised. However, she praised the decision. She found it poignant that someone who comes from a generation where "even gay people are taught to be homophobic" had come out.

Kim is supportive and persuades her to come out to Rhona. Jameson appreciated that Mary and Kim were vulnerable with each other and thought that having Mary let her guard down to Kim was interesting writing. She thanked King for her portrayal of Kim's tender side which is not often seen and said that it was great to work with her. Jameson also confirmed that the pair would not become lovers and said that a new character would instead be her eventual love interest. After coming out to Rhona, Rhona wonders if her entire childhood and family life was a lie and later "cruelly outs" Mary to the villagers. Rhona's "kneejerk reaction" cuts Mary deep and leaves her feeling hurt, worried and lost. However, she is relieved when Rhona decides to support her as opposed to criticising her. Mary seeks support from fellow lesbian Vanessa Woodfield (Michelle Hardwick) but mistakes her kindness for flirtation and attempts to kiss her, with Vanessa pulling away. Afterwards, she confides in Rhona about what happened and Mary's vulnerability is explored when she admits that hiding her sexuality for so many years has left her feeling lonely. She talks about how she has spent her life watching others in love and feels that she has missed the boat due to being 70.

=== Being conned and revenge porn ===
After a busy first five months on Emmerdale, Mary's storylines quietened down. Then in November 2022, Jameson said that her schedule had gotten much busier after being informed of a big story for Mary. She then signed a contract to remain on Emmerdale for another year. Details of the storyline Jameson had been filming were announced in January 2023 when it was confirmed that Mary would be getting a love interest. She downloads a dating app and begins going on dates with various women. She has issues with her first two dates and confides in friend Kim, who advises her to be confident. She then meets Faye Helders (Jane Gurnett) and finds that they share common interests. The pair begin messaging and plan other dates beyond their first. Mary boldly kisses Faye and the pair later go to the bedroom together in scenes that see them "take their romance to their next level".

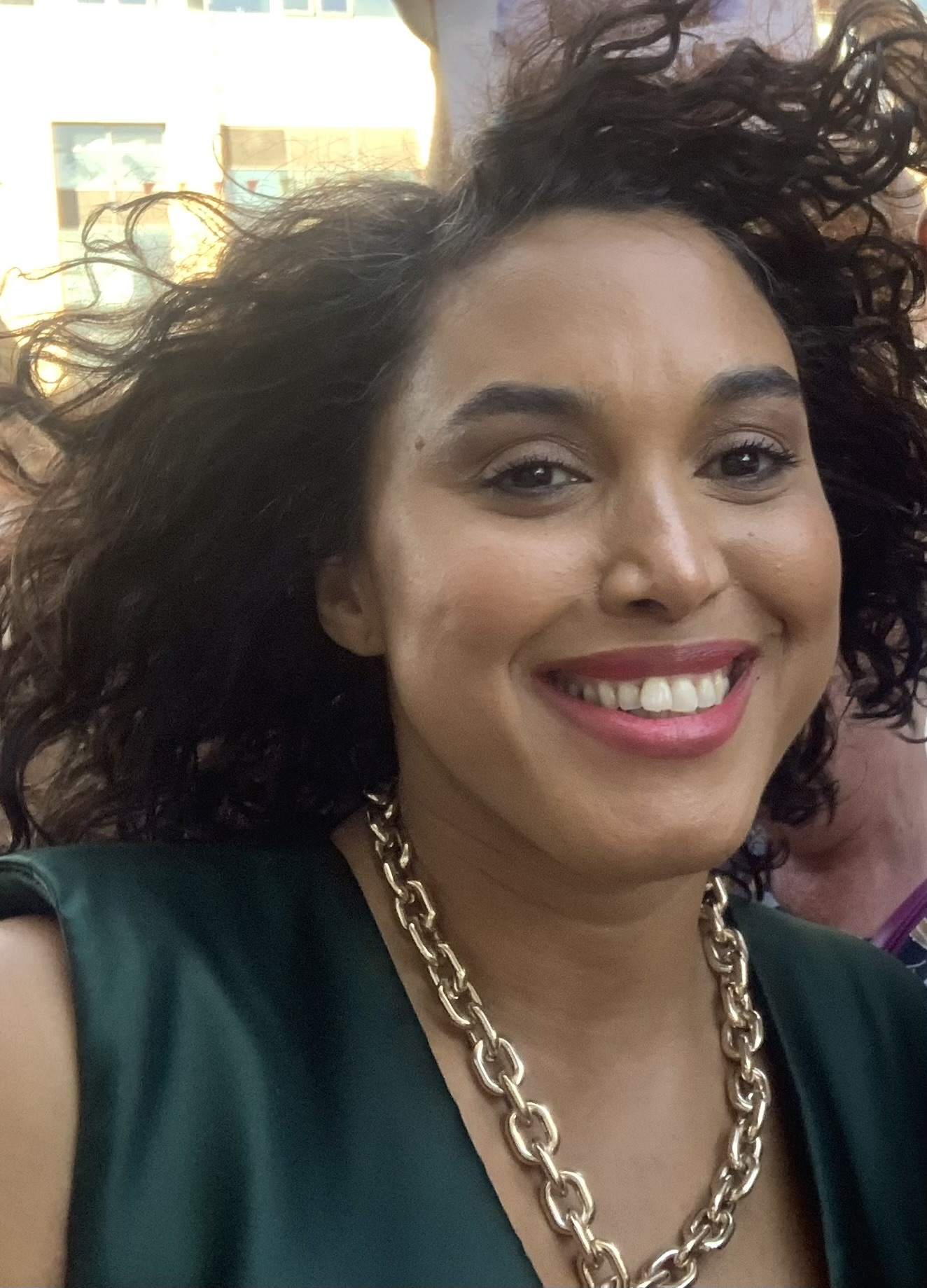
Suzy Merton (Martelle Edinborough, pictured) warns Mary about Faye. She later sets her up on a date.

Speaking about the romantic pairing, executive producer Jane Hudson explained that since it is Mary's first relationship since coming out, viewers would see her become very vulnerable with Faye. However, she revealed that "unfortunately it's not going to be a happy ending" for the two. Faye cons Mary into believing that she is collecting money for a women's refuge centre, secretly conning her out of money by pretending that she is in love with Mary. Suzy Merton (Martelle Edinborough) warns Mary about Faye, who does not listen, and it was confirmed that the storyline would take a violent turn. Faye attacks Mary and steals her money. Despite not wanting to report her, Rhona goes behind her back and calls the police, with her and Suzy persuading Mary to report Faye. Jameson thought it was sad that Mary's first relationship since coming out had ended badly was glad to raise awareness of the harsh realities of elderly people being scammed. Mary then becomes wary to begin dating again. Jameson explained that Mary's family and friends push her to build her up after Faye "ripped away" Mary's confidence.

Faye is arrested which Mary is "delighted" at, since she is terrified by the idea of standing in court and being cross-questioned. Months after her arrest, it was confirmed that Gurnett would be reprising her role as Faye in a blackmail plot. Faye reveals that she possesses a nude photo of Mary, which she took without consent and threatens to release the picture to Mary's contacts, unless Mary withdraws her police statement over the con. Jameson explained that Mary is especially worried about the photo being released since she harbours fears of being laughed at due to her age. She explained: "I think women in their 70s having a sex life is a very delicate conversation to have anyway, let alone when that woman has recently come out as a lesbian." The fear makes Mary consider changing her statement, but after hearing from April that she wants to become a journalist like Mary to uncover exploitation, she decides against it. Jameson said: "It kind of quietly shames Mary into thinking, 'Yes, that's the woman I am, really'".

Faye releases the revenge porn of Mary, who is initially horrified. However, after a pep talk from Kim, she becomes empowered about what has happened. Weeks after the revenge porn, Mary "faces a new struggle" by trying to move on with dating. Jameson opined that Mary saw Faye as the love of her life so quickly, and to be betrayed by her, it had become very tough for Mary. Mary is a proud person and does not want to appear weak. She feels as though weakness got her into the situation with Faye, so if she feels it again, the same thing could happen. She "puts on a brave face" and attends the trial, claiming to have arranged a date for afterwards. Rhona and Marlon are not convinced by her words, but Paddy Kirk (Dominic Brunt) is the person to discover she has been lying about going on dates. He persuades her to confide in Rhona and Marlon. Rhona organises a day for Mary, Marlon and Paddy to face their fears, which leaves Mary daunted since she is used to solving others' problems. Despite her fears, Mary is glad to have people's support and Jameson said that the scenes are a "turning point" in the storyline, with Mary going on a date with Suzy's colleague, Rosalind (Karen Ascoe).

== Reception ==
Prior to her debut, Entertainment Daily billed Mary's arrival as one of five future storylines that would "save the soaps", praising Jameson's acting abilities. Shortly after her introduction, viewers branded her a "devil woman" and were suspicious of her intentions with Marlon since they did not want Mary to ruin Rhona and Marlon's relationship. However, public opinion on her soon changed and months into her tenure, the Metro wrote that Mary had quickly become a fan favourite. Viewers liked Mary's "witty one-liners and the fact she really isn’t afraid to say what she thinks". The Daily Express described her as a "stand-out star" and noted that she had become beloved.

Following the departure of fan favourite Meena Jutla (Paige Sandhu), viewers and critics found that Emmerdale had entered a "tough spot". However, Entertainment Daily wrote an article claiming that Mary and Kim's friendship was saving the soap. They praised the pairing for their scenes and noted that they feel like a realistic friendship, describing Mary coming out to Kim as "one of those rare storylines that has just worked from the get go". Metro journalist Maisie Spackman praised Mary's sexuality storyline for the accurate depiction. Spackman, a lesbian writer, praised Emmerdale for their representation and related to Mary's feelings of regret over hiding her sexuality. Viewers were "heartbroken" for Mary following the twist regarding Faye's true intentions and wanted Mary to have a happy relationship with someone. Metro writer Calli Kitson felt similarly, joking that "when Mary is sad, we are sad with her".

== See also ==
- List of lesbian characters in television
- List of LGBT characters in soap operas
