= List of Emmerdale characters introduced in 2023 =

Emmerdale is a British soap opera first broadcast on 16 October 1972. The following is a list of characters that first appeared during 2023, by order of first appearance. All characters are introduced by the soap's executive producer, Jane Hudson. January saw the introduction of Marshall Hamston (Max Fletcher), a classmate of Arthur Thomas (Alfie Clarke). Gus Malcolm (Alan McKenna) debuted in April as the ex-husband of Rhona Goskirk (Zoë Henry). In June, Flo Wilson joined as Claudette, the mother of Charles Anderson (Kevin Mathurin). She was soon followed by Victor (Eddie Osei), her husband and Charles' father. Brahmdeo Shannon Ramana then joined in July as Suni, Jai Sharma's (Chris Bisson) cousin. Corey Sanderson (Kyle Row) debuted in August as an old friend of Nate Robinson's (Jurell Carter). He is followed by his boss, Damon "Harry" Harris (Robert Beck). Later that month, Ben Addis joined as Craig Reed, a man that grew up with Lydia Dingle (Karen Blick) in a children's home. Additionally, multiple other characters appeared throughout the year.

== Marshall Hamston ==
Marshall Hamston, played by Max Fletcher, first appeared on 5 January 2023. He was introduced as a classmate of Arthur Thomas (Alfie Clarke), who has a crush on Marshall. In a "cruel bet" arranged by Marshall's friends, he pretends to like Arthur back, but when Arthur learns the truth, he is left devastated. Leeds Live wrote that viewers had "taken to" Marshall and were rooting for him and Arthur to become a couple. Eventually, they become a couple. On 11 July 2023, it was announced that Marshall would be leaving the serial at the end of his storyline with Arthur, making his final appearance on 20 July 2023. The exit was described as "sudden" by Radio Times.

== Faye Helders ==
Faye Helders
- Emmerdale character
- Portrayed by: Jane Gurnett
- First appearance: Episode 9587; 27 January 2023
- Last appearance: Episode 9733; 19 July 2023
- Introduced by: Jane Hudson

Faye Helders, played by Jane Gurnett, first appeared on 29 January 2023 as a love interest for Mary Goskirk, whom she initially goes on a date with and the pair agree to see each other again. However, as time goes by, it transpires that Faye is trying to scam Mary and other villagers by setting up fundraisers for a charity she has made up. When Mary finds this out, Faye attacks her and leaves her unconscious, to later be found by ex-son-in-law Gus Malcolms, and departs on 2 May 2023.

Digital Spy announced on 4 July 2023 that Faye would be returning to the soap, and Gurnett returned on-screen on 17 July 2023. She appears to be homeless, but this also turns out not to be true. She then blackmails Mary with a nude photo of her, she but manages to have Faye arrested. However, Faye sends the photo to all of Mary's contacts. Gurnett made her final appearance as Faye on 19 July 2023.

Laura-Jayne Tyler from Inside Soap praised Faye, writing, "Forget Emmerdale serial killers of legend: Jane Gurnett's ability to turn on a sixpence from teary tea leaf to ruthless con woman is genuinely terrifying, and makes Faye easily one of the best Dales villains we've seen in years. Village bosses need to dig deep and find a reason to keep her around for good. She's just too damned watchable to be festering in jail!"

== Gus Malcolms ==
Gus Malcolms
- Emmerdale character
- Portrayed by: Alan McKenna
- Duration: 2023–2024
- First appearance: Episode 9644; 5 April 2023
- Last appearance: Episode 10,012/3; 6 June 2024
- Introduced by: Jane Hudson
In-universe information
- Occupation: Civil Servant
- Wife: Rhona Goskirk (backstory); Lucy Malcolms (until 2023)
- Daughters: Ivy Malcolms

Gus Malcolms, played by Alan McKenna, made his first appearance on 5 April 2023. He was introduced as the ex-husband of Rhona Goskirk (Zoë Henry). The pair were married off-screen in the 2000s, in the time between Henry's two stints on the soap. It was said that Gus's arrival will "tug at the heartstrings" for Rhona when he unexpectedly interrupts a date between her and husband Marlon Dingle (Mark Charnock). Gus catches up with Rhona the next day, with the request to use one of their frozen embryos for his new wife they still have stored, which Rhona thought had been destroyed. She is shocked to learn that the embryos still exist and later becomes horrified when she learns that Gus has contacted the clinic pretending to already have her consent.

Speaking on Gus and Rhona's marriage, Henry said that their ending was not happy. She explained that they both wanted children and due to stressful rounds of IVF, Rhona left him and the divorce went on for years. She stated that his arrival brings back memories of a turbulent and unpleasant time in Rhona's life which she thought had ended. She also said: "While Rhona is thrilled Gus is happily remarried, him suggesting she allows him to use these embryos - and his wife carry the child - is enormously complicated".

Gus makes an unannounced return on 1 November 2023, along with his wife Lucy (Charlotte Asprey), when they bump into Marlon in the hospital. Lucy is pregnant, which Marlon notices, which makes him realise that Gus has used the embryos without Rhona's consent. Gus admits to faking her consent by which he stole her passport, which was previously believed to be done by Faye Helders (Jane Gurnett). Marlon threatens to tell Rhona about what has happened.

== Ally ==
Ally
- Emmerdale character
- Portrayed by: Josh Horrocks
- First appearance: Episode 9657/8; 20 April 2023
- Last appearance: Episode 9698/9; 8 June 2023
- Introduced by: Jane Hudson

Ally, played by Josh Horrocks made his first appearance on 20 April 2023. He the secret boyfriend of Nicky Miligan (Lewis Cope), who turns up ahead of Nicky's wedding to Gabby Thomas (Rosie Bentham), which was part of a revenge scheme set up by Nicky's father, Caleb Miligan (William Ash) against Kim Tate (Claire King) for the death of his father Frank Tate (Norman Bowler). Ally was Horrocks' second role in Emmerdale after playing Josh, a character who was chatting to Vanessa Woodfield (Michelle Hardwick) in a bar in 2020. Producer Jane Hudson had told Radio Times: "There is something else you're going to learn and there is going to be someone from Nicky's past turning up as well and you'll be left wondering what that means for Gabby."

Initially, Ally was introduced as a friend of Nicky's but on 25 April 2023, it was revealed that they were actually former lovers, who then went on to share a passionate kiss on a roadside. As time goes by, Nicky finds it harder and harder to go through with the wedding to Gabby, and Ally continues to persuade him to break it off, but then throws him when he proposes to Nicky, making him more determined to end things with Gabby. After jilting Gabby before their wedding, she finds a beaten up Nicky in the stables and he reveals Caleb's plan to her. The next day, Gabby has Nicky's phone and Ally calls Nicky, only for Gabby to pick up the call and tell him everything. When Ally meets up with Nicky again on 8 June 2023, he breaks off the engagement and hasn't been seen since.

== Reuben Harris ==
Reuben Harris
- Emmerdale character
- Portrayed by: Sebastian Kenneth Downes
- First appearance: Episode 9657/8; 20 April 2023
- Last appearance: Episode 9871; 26 December 2023
- Introduced by: Jane Hudson
In-universe information
- Father: Mackenzie Boyd
- Mother: Chloe Harris
- Stepmother: Charity Dingle
- Grandfathers: Damon "Harry" Harris (adoptive)
- Grandmothers: Kerry Wyatt
- Aunts: Moira Dingle; Amy Wyatt
- First cousins: Holly Barton; Adam Barton; Matty Barton; Kyle Winchester; Isaac Dingle

Reuben Boyd Harris, played by Sebastian Kenneth Downes, is the son of Chloe Harris (Jessie Elland) and Mackenzie Boyd (Lawrence Robb). He was conceived after a one-night stand when Mackenzie's partner, Charity Dingle (Emma Atkins) briefly broke up with him. The pair later discovered that Chloe was pregnant, but didn't tell anyone. Mackenzie later proposed to Charity and the pair later got married, however he still did not tell her.

Eventually, Charity found out when she saw him sat next to baby Reuben after he was born. The pair later split up and Mackenzie ended up with Chloe and proposing to her before he and Charity got divorced. However the engagement was broken off after Mackenzie slept with Charity the two of them along with Chloe were involved in a car accident that led to the car hanging over the edge of a cliff. Mack was able to exit the car and save Charity first, but before he could save Chloe, the car tumbled down the cliff edge. As a result, Chloe had severe injuries that she made a full recovery from, and after so sought revenge on Mackenzie by making contact with her father Damon (Robert Beck), who kidnaps him and holds him at gunpoint. He is however rescued by Charity and Chas Dingle (Lucy Pargeter), the former of which shoots him after she gets hold of the gun whilst fighting him. As a result of the events, Chloe departs on 26 December 2023, taking Reuben with her.

== Claudette Anderson ==
Claudette Anderson
- Emmerdale character
- Portrayed by: Flo Wilson
- Duration: 2023–present
- First appearance: Episode 9687; 25 May 2023
- Introduced by: Jane Hudson
In-universe information
- Husband: Victor Anderson (until 2023)
- Sons: Charles Anderson
- Grandsons: Ethan Anderson
- Granddaughters: Naomi Walters

Claudette Anderson, played by Flo Wilson, made her first appearance on 25 May 2023. She was introduced as the mother of established character Charles Anderson (Kevin Mathurin). Emmerdale announced her casting on 24 April 2023, with Wilson having begun filming on the soap that month. On the character, ITV wrote: "Claudette is a force to be reckoned with and totally unafraid to speak her mind. She is deeply proud of her son Charles' position as a vicar and grandson Ethan's (Emile John) legal career. She believes herself to be a loving matriarch, but secretly Charles finds his mother rather overbearing and soon the other villagers will learn not to get on the wrong side of Claudette."

Executive producer Jane Hudson hinted that Claudette's arrival on Emmerdale would impact the drama of the Anderson family unit and was excited for viewers to be introduced to her. Wilson felt blessed to be cast on the serial and hoped that her work would make the cast and crew proud. Mathurin, who portrays Claudette's son Charles, had worked with Wilson prior to their Emmerdale stints. Of her casting as Claudette, he said: "when I saw her name on the sheet I knew she'd be perfect to bring Claudette to life. Flo is a wonderful soul, an amazing actress and is already settling in."

Claudette's first scenes see her arguing with Manpreet Sharma (Rebecca Sarker), unaware that she is dating her son. Daniel Kilkelly, writing for Digital Spy, said that Claudette's debut appearance was memorable. After making numerous jibes at Manpreet, Wilson opined that her character "doesn't have a mean bone in her body", but that she unknowingly "walks over people's feelings and emotions". Claudette speaks her mind, believing that speaking her truth and being clear is the best way to be. Wilson reckoned that having been alone for a long time, Claudette has forgotten how to behave around others. She appreciated Claudette's personality and described the writing as "absolutely brilliant". She loved Claudette's lines says and the way that she could deliver them as an actress.

On Claudette's relationship with her son, Wilson said that she infantilises Charles since she is too motherly. She is used to caring for him, and upon her arrival to the village, she continues to do it despite him being a grown man. Claudette is religious and put Charles through Sunday school as a child. This made him religious, so she believes that she is the reason for him becoming a vicar, which she is "very proud" of. Due to her religious beliefs, she disapproves of Charles and Manpreet being together due to not being married and "living in sin". Claudette believes that Manpreet has led them into sin since she feels her vicar son would not do that. Wilson said that Claudette would stick around in the village for a long time to ensure that Charles is on the "straight and narrow" and hinted that she would not approve of Manpreet for a long time.

== Victor Anderson ==
Victor Anderson
- Emmerdale character
- Portrayed by: Eddie Osei
- First appearance: Episode 9698; 8 June 2023
- Last appearance: Episode 9768; 29 August 2023
- Introduced by: Jane Hudson
In-universe information
- Wife: Claudette Anderson (until 2023)
- Sons: Charles Anderson
- Grandsons: Ethan Anderson
- Granddaughters: Naomi Walters

Victor Anderson, played by Eddie Osei, made his first appearance on 8 June 2023. The character was not announced prior to his surprise arrival in the series, when he was introduced as Charles' (Kevin Mathurin) father being released from prison. Prior to his first scene, Charles was seen acting strangely and he later pays a visit to a high-security prison. He sees Victor out of prison and warns him to stay away from him and mother Claudette (Flo Wilson). Emmerdale producers confirmed that his sentence was long, but kept the reason for his imprisonment secret.

Emmerdale producer Hannah Cheers said: "Victor's arrival in Emmerdale turns life for the Andersons upside down. The brilliant addition of Eddie Osei as Victor has allowed us to learn more about who the Andersons are and we can't wait for the audience to watch as the drama unfolds. While Claudette is confronted by the husband she prayed she'd never see again, Charles has to face up to painful past traumas and he makes no secret of the fact that Victor is not welcome here." On his casting, Osei said that he felt privileged to be joining Emmerdale. He also expressed his excitement at being able to play "such an enigmatic character [...] who causes the Anderson family so much trouble".

After struggling to settle back into his family unit, Victor reveals that he has been diagnosed with an unruptured aneurysm, though Charles suspects he is lying. He is later the sole suspect when a necklace gifted to Manpreet Sharma (Rebecca Sarker) is stolen and he runs away when the police are called. Charles, who is a vicar, finds him dead in his church after a "sudden and tragic death".

== Suni Sharma ==
Suni Sharma
- Emmerdale character
- Portrayed by: Brahmdeo Shannon Ramana
- Duration: 2023–2024
- First appearance: Episode 9726; 11 July 2023
- Last appearance: Episode 10,030/31; 4 July 2024
- Introduced by: Jane Hudson
In-universe information
- Father: Amit Sharma
- Mother: Sanya Sharma
- Sisters: Nisha Sharma
- Half-brothers: Jai Sharma
- Uncles: Rishi Sharma
- First cousins: Nikhil Sharma; Priya Sharma

Suni Sharma, played by Brahmdeo Shannon Ramana, made his first appearance on 11 July 2023. He was introduced as the cousin of Jai Sharma (Chris Bisson) and nephew of Rishi Sharma (Bhasker Patel). Rishi, who has not seen Suni for some time, is delighted when Suni arrives unannounced for Jai's wedding as he prepares to marry Laurel Thomas (Charlotte Bellamy). Suni arrives at a time where Jai is warring with Rishi over his real father. ITV hinted that Suni could be "just the ticket to restore harmony" in the Sharma family. He was also confirmed to be a love interest for Nicky Miligan (Lewis Cope).

Suni was billed as a "confident, magnetic and very fashion conscious" character who would be bringing "some flair" to Emmerdale. Suni is shown to be someone who goes after what he wants and is not afraid to be his true self. Ramana opined that Emmerdale is brilliant at "making sure there's accurate representation of real people and telling their authentic stories". He was delighted to be cast on the soap due to watching it as a child with his parents. He was also excited to play a gay Asian character, since it would "give exposure to a demographic which is sadly still under-represented". Executive producer Jane Hudson echoed Ramana's excitement and stated: "he certainly hits the ground running as we throw him right into the heart of a big Sharma story."

== Corey Sanderson ==
Corey Sanderson
- Emmerdale character
- Portrayed by: Kyle Rowe
- First appearance: Episode 9744; 1 August 2023
- Last appearance: Episode 9770/1; 31 August 2023
- Introduced by: Jane Hudson
In-universe information
- Occupation: Businessman

Corey Sanderson, played by Kyle Rowe, made his first appearance on 2 August 2023. He arrives in the village giving Cain Dingle (Jeff Hordley) a job opportunity; Cain's son, Nate Robinson (Jurell Carter), sees them talking and is shocked when he sees Corey. It transpires that the two went to school together, and amidst financial problems, Nate heads to Corey's office and asks him for a job, but Corey explains that there is no work available. Viewers were immediately suspicious of Corey's intentions, noting his unprofessional office and "uneasy vibe".

Nate visits Corey again and finds him with Caleb Miligan (William Ash), Nate's villainous uncle, and learns that they are working together. Nate is "thwarted" when offered money to keep quiet but eventually demands a job for his silence. Corey's boss, Damon "Harry" Harris (Robert Beck), later arrives.

== Damon "Harry" Harris ==
Damon Harris
- Emmerdale character
- Portrayed by: Robert Beck
- Duration: 2023–2024
- First appearance: 7 August 2023
- Last appearance: 22 February 2024
- Introduced by: Laura Shaw
In-universe information
- Other names: Harry; Simon
- Occupation: Criminal
- Wife: Karen Harris
- Daughters: Gemma Harris
- Adoptive daughters: Chloe Harris
- Grandsons: Reuben Harris (adoptive)

Damon "Harry" Harris, played by Robert Beck, made his first appearance on 7 August 2023. He was introduced as the scary boss of Corey Sanderson (Kyle Rowe). Beck previously appeared on Emmerdale as Gavin Ferris, a love interest for Bernice Blackstock (Samantha Giles), and was excited to return to the soap in an unrelated role. He said: "I am thrilled to be working on Emmerdale again, it’s a great show that I have followed for years, with a fabulous cast. It has always had a special place in my heart. I had a fantastic time working on the show playing Gavin Ferris, 24 years ago. The cast and crew were so welcoming and of course, I met my wife because of that job so I have much to thank Emmerdale for! I'm looking forward to getting involved and to working with such a great bunch again." On 14 December 2023, it is revealed that his real name is Damon Harris and he is the adopted father of Chloe Harris (Jessie Elland).

Emmerdale producer Laura Shaw was thrilled to have Beck on the show and billed Harry as a dangerous and unpredictable character. She hinted: "Harry will bring drama and peril to some of our most loved villagers, with some twists and turns along the way that our viewers really won't be expecting!"

== Craig Reed ==
Craig Reed
- Emmerdale character
- Portrayed by: Ben Addis
- First appearance: Episode 9758; 17 August 2023
- Last appearance: Episode 9826; 2 November 2023
- Introduced by: Jane Hudson
In-universe information
- Occupation: Businessman
- Sons: Toby Finn

Craig Reed, played by Ben Addis, made his first appearance on 17 August 2023. His casting was announced on 7 August 2023 when it was confirmed that his arrival would shake Lydia Dingle (Karen Blick). It transpires that Craig and Lydia grew up together in a children's home. He was referenced on-screen in 2019 when Emmerdale explored Lydia's backstory, which involves falling pregnant at the home and fearing the repercussions, she does not confide in anyone about the pregnancy and eventually gives birth to a stillborn baby. She wrapped the baby up and buried him, with the baby's remains being found in 2019. Lydia reveals to husband Sam Dingle (James Hooton) that Craig is the father of the baby.

After Craig meets Lydia at a careers fair in the village, it was confirmed that Craig would feature prominently on-screen after Lydia accepts a job offer from him. He was introduced as a successful businessman with a fancy car that impresses Lydia's stepson, Samson Dingle (Sam Hall). It was hinted by Digital Spy's Daniel Kilkelly that Craig's presence would make Sam feel threatened. Shortly after his introduction, it was confirmed that Craig would rape Lydia in an issue-led storyline. Emmerdale were advised by Rape Crisis England & Wales on how to depict the storyline accurately. The story is set to climax in Craig's death caused by a member of the Dingle family, as part of a whodunit plot.

== Sophie Grisham ==
Sophie Grisham
- Emmerdale character
- Portrayed by: Martha Cope
- Duration: 2023–2024
- First appearance: Episode 9788/9; 21 September 2023
- Last appearance: Episode 9884; 8 January 2024
- Introduced by: Jane Hudson
In-universe information
- Adoptive sons: Oscar Grisham

Sophie Grisham, played by Martha Cope, is the adoptive mother of Oscar Grisham (Harley Hamilton), a child who Ryan Stocks (James Moore) and Gail Loman (Rachael Gill-Davis) gave up for adoption after he was born in 2010. Cope's casting was announced on 4 September 2023, and her character was teased that Martha would play a relative of one of the villagers. Leeds Live reported that a source said: "Martha will appear later this year and kick off a huge storyline. She’s making a guest appearance but she has an unmatched soap pedigree, so she’s bound to impress fans." Cope made her debut on 21 September 2023.

Sophie gets into contact with Gail when Oscar is thirteen years old since he has been diagnosed with aplastic anemia and requires a bone marrow transplant. Sophie asks Gail if she could be tested to see if she was a match and she discovers that she is, so offers up her bone marrow. Sophie later cuts contact between Oscar and his parents, against his wishes. Ryan tried to reach out to Oscar by sending him a friend request on Facebook, but this leads to Sophie confronting him and Gail in The Woolpack and telling them that he is upset and doesn't want anything to do with them.

== Oscar Grisham ==
Oscar Grisham
- Emmerdale character
- Portrayed by: Harley Hamilton
- Duration: 2023–2024
- First appearance: Episode 9792; 26 September 2023
- Last appearance: Episode 9884; 8 January 2024
- Introduced by: Jane Hudson
In-universe information
- Father: Ryan Stocks
- Mother: Gail Loman
- Adoptive mother: Sophie Grisham
- Grandfathers: Mark Bails
- Grandmothers: Charity Dingle; Irene Stocks (adoptive)
- Uncles: Noah Dingle; Moses Dingle; Luke Bails; Josh Stocks (adoptive)
- Aunts: Debbie Dingle; Molly Bails; Leyla Sugden
- First cousins: Sarah Sugden; Jack Sugden
- Other relatives: Chas Dingle; Marlon Dingle; Cain Dingle; Sam Dingle; Mandy Dingle; Belle Dingle; Aaron Dingle; Leo Goskirk; Kyle Winchester; Isaac Dingle; Nate Robinson; Eve Dingle; Frankie Robinson; April Windsor; Samson Dingle; Esther Spencer

Oscar Grisham, played by Harley Hamilton is the biological son of Ryan Stocks (James Moore) and Gail Loman (Rachel Gill-Davis) who is thirteen and was born in 2010. Ryan and Gail gave him up for adoption when he was born and he was adopted by Sophie Grisham (Martha Cope). He made his first appearance on 26 September 2023. Oscar has aplastic anemia so Sophie arrives in the village to gain contact with Gail, since Oscar needs a bone marrow transplant and requires a match. Gail and Ryan are both tested and Gail is a match, so offers up her bone marrow. They get a chance to meet Oscar, but After the operation is done, Sophie cuts contact between Oscar and his parents, against his wishes. Ryan tried to reach out to Oscar by sending him a friend request on Facebook, but this leads to Sophie confronting him and Gail in The Woolpack and telling them that he is upset and doesn't want anything to do with them.

On 8 January 2024, Oscar made a return to Emmerdale when he met his grandmother, Charity Dingle (Emma Atkins). Oscar begins to ask questions about his biological grandfather, who is Mark Bails (Rocky Marshall), who groomed and sexually abused Charity when she was 14-years-old, leaving Charity in "turmoil". However, when Charity tells Oscar her age when she gave birth to his father, he reassures her that he's glad his grandfather is no longer around and she's relieved by his understanding reaction.

== Amit Sharma ==
Amit Sharma
- Emmerdale character
- Portrayed by: Anil Goutam
- Duration: 2023–2024
- First appearance: Episode 9803; 9 October 2023
- Last appearance: Episode 9955; 29 March 2024
- Introduced by: Jane Hudson
In-universe information
- Brothers: Rishi Sharma
- Wife: Sanya Sharma
- Sons: Jai Sharma; Suni Sharma
- Daughters: Nisha Sharma

Amit Sharma, played by Anil Goutam, made his first appearance on 9 October 2023. He was introduced as the brother of Rishi Sharma (Bhasker Patel) and the father of Suni Sharma (Brahmdeo Shannon Ramana), who was also revealed to be the biological father of Jai Sharma (Chris Bisson) after he found his adoption papers. Goutam's casting was announced on 7 October 2023. Producer Laura Shaw told Digital Spy: "what you'll see with Amit is quite a dark and complex character, and although we see Suni wanting him to stick around, could Suni end up regretting that? Is Amit hiding another secret that threatens to blow the whole family apart?"

After Amit's arrival in Emmerdale, he tells Jai the reason he allowed Rishi to adopt him was due to a business deal that the Sharma family had with the family that his wife Sanya was a part of and didn't want to miss out on the deal. Amit remained in Emmerdale for 6 months, and within that time it was revealed that he actually saw Rishi fall down the stairs to his death and it was due to the shock of Amit's sudden arrival, which he initially revealed to Suni, but both kept a secret, causing Jai to be angry at Suni as well. However, it was then later revealed that Amit had actually pushed Rishi down the stairs so he could get his hands on a family inheritance from their aunt who was prepared to allow her oldest surviving nephew to inherit after her death. When Jai finds this out, he tries to avenge Rishi's death by pushing him down the stairs just like he did to his adoptive father and threatens him that he would expose his murder if he doesn't leave the village. Amit then departs on 29 March 2024. Bisson, who plays Jai, spoke about Amit's departure by saying "Amit is the villain that we suspected or that Jai suspected he was. Amit has been very devious and the pain that Jai suffered over the last eight months or so since Rishi's death has now exploded. It is like a big fireball inside him and it's all coming out in one go."

== Ivy Malcolms ==
Ivy Malcolms
- Emmerdale character
- Portrayed by: Lois Lee Boote; Alice Maeve Leigh
- Duration: 2023–present
- First appearance: Episode 9853; 5 December 2023
- Introduced by: Jane Hudson
In-universe information
- Father: Gus Malcolms
- Mother: Rhona Goskirk (biological); Lucy Malcolms (surrogate)
- Stepfather: Marlon Dingle
- Half-brothers: Leo Goskirk
- Grandmothers: Mary Goskirk

Ivy Malcolms is the biological daughter of Gus Malcolms (Alan McKenna) and Rhona Goskirk (Zoë Henry), who was born via surrogate mother Lucy Malcolms (Charlotte Asprey), who was born on 16 November and made her first on-screen appearance on 5 December. Between Rhona's two stints in Emmerdale, she was married to Gus and the two of them underwent IVF treatment, hoping to start a new family. However, the stress of the treatment caused their marriage to end in a bitter divorce, meaning their embryos would remain frozen for close to two decades. Rhona however believed they had been destroyed.

In April 2023, Gus reappeared with his current wife Lucy to ask Rhona's permission to use their frozen embryos, which angered her having believed that they had been destroyed long ago. She did allow them to use them after being persuaded, but had a change of heart. They refused to take no for an answer so Gus stole Rhona's passport to forge a signature on the release forms. Lucy was then implanted with one of Rhona's embryos in May. Gus and Lucy then reappeared in October when Rhona's current husband Marlon Dingle (Mark Charnock) saw them in the hospital and noticed that Lucy, who he knew wasn't able to conceive, was pregnant, which could only mean that they used Rhona's embryo without her permission. Gus also revealed that he stole Rhona's passport, which had been believed to be done by Faye Helders (Jane Gurnett). When Rhona eventually finds out from Marlon, she is furious and they storm over to Gus and Lucy's, however the fighting causes Lucy to go into early labour and she sadly loses her life from complications after giving birth to Ivy.

After Ivy's birth, Rhona becomes obsessed with Ivy as she feels that she was a part of her being her biological mother and starts to go around Gus's house with provisions. Her mother Mary Goskirk (Louise Jameson) also regularly goes around to help Gus look after Ivy as he clearly struggles to cope with looking after Ivy and do everything else he needs to do. Rhona later invited him and Ivy to spend Christmas with them in Emmerdale.

== Evan Fletcher ==
Evan Fletcher
- Emmerdale character
- Portrayed by: Malachi McKenzie
- Duration: 2023–present
- First appearance: Episode 9867/8; 21 December 2023
- Introduced by: Jane Hudson
In-universe information
- Other names: Evan Fletcher II
- Father: Billy Fletcher
- Mother: Dawn Fletcher
- Sisters: Clemmie Reed (adoptive)
- Half-brothers: Lucas Taylor
- Grandfathers: Will Taylor; Evan Fletcher Sr
- Grandmothers: Jessie Grant; Rose Jackson
- Uncles: Ellis Chapman

Evan Fletcher is the newborn son of Billy (Jay Kontzle) and Dawn Fletcher (Olivia Bromley) and younger half-brother of Lucas Taylor (Noah Ryan Aspinall) and adoptive brother of Clemmie Reed (Mabel Addison), whom his parents have special guardianship of. He was born a few days late at Home Farm, the home of his parents, on 21 December and is named after his late grandfather Evan, who died when Billy was young. He is played by Malachi McKenzie.

On 10 April 2024, it was announced that Evan would be diagnosed with leukaemia. Billy and Dawn received his diagnosis in late April 2024. Producer Laura Shaw spoke on the upcoming storyline by saying "We've got a big story coming up for Billy and Dawn. We've seen these two go through a whole heap of challenges in their relationship. They've finally got married, they survived Meena, Dawn got pregnant, they had baby Evan and it's been fairly rosy for these two over the past few months. We're going to see their world totally rocked when, almost out of nowhere, Evan is diagnosed with acute lymphoblastic leukaemia (ALL). ALL is one of the most common childhood leukaemias. I think there's 650 children and young adults diagnosed with that every year in the UK." Shaw also told Digital Spy how Evan's diagnosis will affect his family. "What we really wanted to show with this story is what a stress and strain a long-term illness like this can put on a family. What we'll see is how the roles of Dawn and Billy are changed almost overnight and out of nowhere. We'll see how Lucas and Clemmie are affected and the stress that it puts on those sibling dynamics. We'll see how this affects Billy and Dawn's relationship, the wider family in Kim Tate (Claire King) and Will Taylor (Dean Andrews), and all of their friends. There's also the financial pressure that looking after a child long-term like that can put on a whole family. That's going to be a big story for us going forward."

== Other characters ==
Character	Episode date(s)	Actor	Circumstances
Gordon Mathers	5, 9 January	James Buller	A detective who investigates the stabbing of Jacob Gallagher (Joe-Warren Plant) caused by Callum Matthews (Tom Ashley).
Gus	6 January	Rhys Walker	Two of Marshall Hamston's (Max Fletcher) friends who bully Arthur Thomas (Alfie Clarke) for being gay.
Tom	6, 30 January	Toby Fullman	Two of Marshall Hamston's (Max Fletcher) friends who bully Arthur Thomas (Alfie Clarke) for being gay.
Richard	16 January–2 March	Harry Long	A solicitor hired by Caleb Miligan (William Ash) to represent his nephew, Kyle Winchester (Huey Quinn), after he is charged with Al Chapman's (Michael Wildman) murder.
Kev	16 January, 7 February	Matthew Connell	A drayman who delivers alcohol to the Woolpack. Whilst talking to Charity Dingle (Emma Atkins) about the order, he notices Charity's fiancé Mackenzie Boyd (Lawrence Robb) arguing with Chloe Harris (Jessie Elland), and jokes that Mackenzie and Chloe are together, which amuses Charity and makes Mackenzie uneasy, before being asked to leave.
Justin Griffiths	23–24 January	Sean Knopp	The CEO at Grifftastic Events. He attends an event at Take A Vow hosted by Leyla Harding (Roxy Shahidi) and Priya Sharma (Fiona Wade). During the event, whilst talking to Justin, Leyla accidentally sets a wedding vail on fire, which causes Priya to run out of the event. Afterwards, Justin offers Leyla a job to be the leader of his business branch in London but explains that he needs an answer by the next day. The next day, Justin sees Priya, who apologises to Justin and explains that the fire had reminded her of when she was trapped in a maze fire, which left her permanently scarred. Justin is impressed by her honesty and strength and invites her for coffee, before offering her the job he originally offered Leyla, which Priya immediately accepts.
Joy	23 January	Martine Brown	A woman who goes on a date with Mary Goskirk (Louise Jameson). When she arrives to the date muddy from cycling, Joy explains that she wants Mary to join her on a cycling date. However, Mary explains that they have little in common and politely declines.
Carol	6–7 February	Sally Bankes	A mother and daughter who go on a double date with Paddy Kirk (Dominic Brunt) and Bear Wolf (Joshua Richards). After Paddy leaves early, so does Bev. However, Carol and Bear spend the night together.
Bev	6 February	Pamela Mayos	A mother and daughter who go on a double date with Paddy Kirk (Dominic Brunt) and Bear Wolf (Joshua Richards). After Paddy leaves early, so does Bev. However, Carol and Bear spend the night together.
Jean Shearidan	14–16 February	Emma Rydal	The owner of Skipdale Lodge, where Paddy Kirk (Dominic Brunt) stays after leaving the village. Charity Dingle (Emma Atkins) calls Jean asking if she has seen or heard from Paddy, who confirms that he has been staying with her. Paddy's estranged wife Chas Dingle (Lucy Pargeter) and ex-wife Mandy Dingle (Lisa Riley) then arrive to take him home.
Mark	15–16 February	Simon Fielding	A salesman staying at Skipdale Lodge. Mandy Dingle (Lisa Riley) questions him about Paddy Kirk (Dominic Brunt). Mark explains that Paddy was looking sad when he first met him and that he decided to show him his range of mini vacuums. As Mandy continues to question Mark, Jean Shearidan (Emma Rydal) requests that she stop.
Toby	17 February	Edward Crook	A former work colleague of Ethan Anderson (Emily John). Ethan meets up with Toby and they drive off together in Toby's car, unaware that they are being watched by Ethan's boyfriend, Marcus Dean (Darcy Grey). After being confronted by Marcus, Ethan explains that he was viewing Toby's house for them to possibly buy as a surprise, explaining that Toby is moving to Newcastle and needs a quick sale. When Marcus accuses Ethan of flirting with Toby, Ethan explains that Toby is married.
Joe	20 February	Joseph Passafaro	The ex-boyfriend of Marcus Dean (Darcy Grey). After an argument with boyfriend Ethan Anderson (Emile John), Marcus meets with Joe and has sex with him. The next day, Marcus arranges to meet Joe after he forgot his wallet and they ended up having sex again. Later that day, as Ethan proposes to Marcus, Joe comes down the stairs, and realises what has happened. Joe is asked to leave by Marcus, but before leaving, he states that he did not know Marcus was in a relationship.
Tim	21–22 February	Joe Da Costa	A musician hired by Bernice Blackstock (Samantha Giles) and Bob Hope (Tony Audenshaw) to play the harp at their reopening of the Grange B&B. The night before the reopening, Tim has sex with Bernice. When Tim is late for his performance, Bob goes up to his room to find him and believes that Tim is dead. When Belinda Foxton (Caroline Harding), a reviewer for the Hotten Courier, is about to go into Tim's room, he walks out, revealing he had overslept after taking a sleeping pill.
Belinda Foxton	22 February	Caroline Harding	A reviewer for the Hotten Courier who attends Bernice Blackstock (Samantha Giles) and Bob Hope's (Tony Audenshaw) reopening of the Grange B&B.
Clare	21–27 March	Lucy Thatcher	A woman who Belle (Eden Taylor-Draper) and Chas Dingle (Lucy Pargeter) see being handed money by Alex Moore (Liam Boyle). Belle and Chas tell Naomi Walters (Karene Peter), Alex's girlfriend, who confronts Alex. Alex brings Naomi to meet Clare and her son. Clare explains to Naomi that Alex is friends with her son's dad when he was in prison and that Alex helps her financially. This is later revealed to be a lie when Alex meets with Clare, revealing that the pair are secretly in a relationship. The pair plan to rob the local surgery of drugs in order to pay off their drug debt.
DC Flynn	31 March–4 April	Tina Barnes	A detective constable who investigates the hit and run on Alex Moore (Liam Boyle) caused by Billy Fletcher (Jay Kontzle).
Lucy Malcolms	10 April-16 November	Charlotte Asprey	The wife of Gus Malcolms (Alan McKenna) who meets his ex-wife Rhona Goskirk (Zoë Henry), whom they try to convince to allow her and Gus to use the frozen embryos Rhona and Gus created during their marriage. However, the pair leave once Rhona informs them that she would not be comfortable with the idea. Gus subsequently steals Rhona's passport to forge her consent to use the embryos, which was originally believed to be stolen by Faye Helders (Jane Gurnett), who had been conning Mary Goskirk (Louise Jamieson). She reappears when Rhona's husband, Marlon Dingle (Mark Charnock), sees Lucy with Gus in the hospital and sees that she is pregnant, meaning they have used the embryos without Rhona's consent. Marlon later tells Rhona what Gus and Lucy have done, which consequently leads to a confrontation on the Malcolms' doorstep, which causes Lucy to go into early labour. Lucy gives birth to Ivy off-screen, but subsequently dies as a result of complications during the birth
Marie	18 April	Theresa Petts	A woman who helps Bernice Blackstock (Samantha Giles) to organise a life drawing art class for Bernice's menopause group.
Steve	11 May	Louis Brogan	A man who attends Andy's Man Club that Paddy Kirk (Dominic Brunt) also attends. During a break, Steve chats to Paddy and Clive (Daniel Brannan), and tells Paddy that his ex-wife left him for a plumber and that after a bad divorce, where he lost his kids to his ex, he started drinking and almost lost his job. He contemplated suicide until he saw a poster for the man club.
Clive	11 May	Daniel Brannan	A man who attends Andy's Man Club that Paddy Kirk (Dominic Brunt) also attends. Clive opens up about how he has been struggling with his daughter's death and that his wife baked a cake to mark her 4th birthday. During a break, Clive assures Paddy that opening up to others about how he is feeling will help to relieve pressure.
Lloyd Sawyer	29 June-3 August	Matt Sutton	A man who finds Amelia Spencer's (Daisy Campbell) social media channel for giving young mothers advice. He poses as a woman and becomes one of her top followers. He later shows up at her place of work and house, revealing who he really was, which frightens Amelia as he begins to harass her. Her father, Dan (Liam Fox) angrily confronts him at his workplace and sends him a message on his telephone answer machine threatening to kill him, which goes against him later on when he punches him. The punch proves to be fatal and after weeks in a coma, Lloyd dies. Dan is then sentenced to 8 years in prison for manslaughter.
Julie Sawyer	7 July-17 August	Emma Stansfield	Lloyd's (Matt Sutton) wife who becomes fixated on avenging him following Dan Spencer (Liam Fox) punching him. Amelia Spencer (Daisy Campbell) tries to inform Julie that Lloyd was grooming and stalking her, but she does not believe her and continues to cause trouble for her and Dan before he is sentenced to 8 years for manslaughter.
Aunt Jean	20 July	Emma Beattie	The aunt of Marshall Hamston (Max Fletcher) who takes him away to live with her.
Rosalind	24 August	Karen Ascoe	A colleague of Suzy Merton's (Martelle Edinborough) who sets Rosalind up on a date with Mary Goskirk (Louise Jameson). The pair decide to be friends.
