= Evie (film) =

Evie: Evil Has a New Name
- Directed by: Dominic Brunt; Jamie Lundy
- Written by: Dominic Brunt
- Produced by: Joanne Mitchell
- Starring: Holli Dempsey; Jay Taylor; Michael Smiley; Liam McMahon; Joanne Mitchell; Honey Lundy
- Cinematography: Edward Ames
- Edited by: Andrew McKee
- Music by: Thomas Ragsdale
- Production company: Full Circle Pictures
- Distributed by: Mill Creek Entertainment
- Release dates: 4 September 2021 (Arrow Video FrightFest); 10 October 2023 (DVD)
- Running time: 83 minutes
- Country: United Kingdom
- Language: English

Evie: Evil Has a New Name is a 2021 British psychological horror film directed by Dominic Brunt and Jamie Lundy and written by Brunt, starring Holli Dempsey, Jay Taylor, Michael Smiley, Liam McMahon, Joanne Mitchell and Honey Lundy.

A young woman (Evie; Honey Lundy) finds a necklace washed up on a beach. Upon donning the cursed necklace, Evie (Holli Dempsey) unleashes a deadly water demon that wants to claim her and those she loves.

== Cast ==
- Holli Dempsey as Evie Halloran
  - Honey Lundy as young Evie
- Jay Taylor as Tony Halloran
  - Danny-Lee Mitchell-Brunt as young Tony
- Michael Smiley as Father Roberts
- Liam McMahon as Gil
- Joanne Mitchell as Jen Halloran
- Martelle Edinborough as Selma
- Mel Wayman as Selkie / Mum
- Justin McDonald as Jeremy
- Mushi Noor as Mr. Stevens
- Julie Foy as Mrs. Werner
- Brooke Cornell as Deborah
- Sienna Cornell as Lydia
- Kate Coogan as Nurse
- Jamie Lundy as Dad
- William Fox as Mad man
- Eden Bella Lundy as Eden
- Richard McNamara as Waiter
- Nicky Evans as Jacob Eli
- Seamus O'Neill as Stanley O'Keefe
- Stuart Wolfenden as Robert Isaac
- Thaila Zucchi as Lilly

== Production ==
The film was shot in Yorkshire, England and on the Llŷn Peninsula in Wales From February to March 2021.

== Release ==
The film premiered at Arrow Video FrightFest on 4 September 2021.

== Reception ==
David Gelmini of Dread Central rated the film 3.5 stars out of 5 and wrote: "Regardless of how you view Evie, the nuanced direction and the strong performances from the cast help to make this into a highly effective slow-burning drama. It’ll likely be remembered as one of the most thought-provoking films from FrightFest this year." Martin Unsworth of Starburst called it "Brunt’s most emotive film since his debut Before Dawn and would work just as well without any mythical qualities." Unsworth wrote that the film "makes the most of the isolated location with sweeping seascapes and windswept dunes" and that the "provocative" score "provides a pensive accompaniment, particularly in the scenes of high drama." Film critic Kim Newman praised the cinematography and wrote that the final act "ties up the plot threads in a satisfying manner – there’s still ambiguity, but we get some concrete genre horror business which pleasingly delivers a consistent irrational explanation for everything – to leave us with a feeling of being genuinely haunted."
