= Rhona Goskirk =

Fictional character from Emmerdale

- Emmerdale character
- Portrayed by: Zoë Henry
- Duration: 2001–2002, 2010–present
- First appearance: Episode 3005; 17 September 2001
- Introduced by: Keith Richardson (2001); Gavin Blyth (2010)
- Spin-off appearances: Paddy and Marlon's Big Night In (2011)
In-universe information
- Occupation: Veterinary surgeon Businesswoman
- Father: Barry Goskirk
- Mother: Mary Goskirk
- Husband: Gus Malcolms (backstory); Paddy Kirk (2012–2017); Pierce Harris (2017–2018); Marlon Dingle (2022–present)
- Sons: Leo Goskirk
- Daughters: Ivy Malcolms
- Stepsons: Marcus Dean
- Stepdaughters: April Windsor

Rhona Goskirk is a fictional character from the British ITV soap opera Emmerdale, played by Zoë Henry. She made her first appearance during the episode broadcast on 17 September 2001. The character was introduced by series producer Steve Frost and she appeared on a recurring basis during 2001 and 2002. She returned to Emmerdale as a full-time character on 31 March 2010, reintroduced by series producer Gavin Blyth.

Rhona has been through a diverse range of storylines, including a romantic bond and later marriage with comedic chef Marlon Dingle (Mark Charnock); giving birth to their son Leo Goskirk, who has Down syndrome; marrying Paddy Kirk (Dominic Brunt); becoming addicted to painkillers, discovering Paddy's affair with her friend Tess Harris (Nicola Stephenson) after Tess' death; pursuing a manipulative relationship with Tess's widower Pierce Harris (Jonathan Wrather), her near-death in the soap's biggest stunt known as "No Return Week", marital rape at the hands of Pierce; becoming infertile after a farming accident; and bringing Pierce to justice for seemingly killing her boyfriend Graham Foster (Andrew Scarborough) amid feuding with Graham's estranged boss and ex-wife Kim Tate (Claire King).

== Development ==
=== Casting ===
Henry joined the cast of Emmerdale as Rhona Goskirk in 2001 for an initial seven episodes. The actress returned in 2002 for another brief stint, departing in December. On 13 February 2010, Kris Green of Digital Spy reported Henry had reprised her role and Rhona would be returning to Emmerdale later in the year. Rhona returned on 31 March 2010.

=== Family and characterisation ===
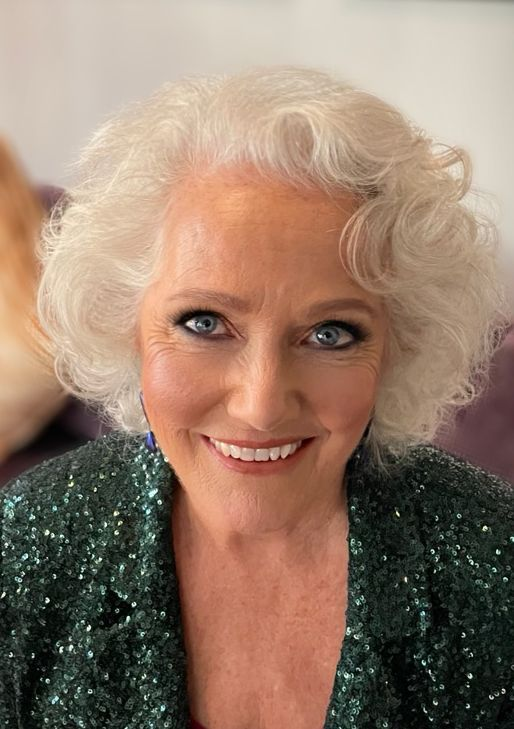
Louise Jameson was cast as Rhona's mother in 2022.

In an interview with Inside Soap, Henry expressed her desire to see Rhona's mother be cast on Emmerdale. She stated: "I'd love to see Rhona's mum, who lives in Kent and we hear about all the time, come to the Dales." Regarding who she would want to portray her mother Mary, Henry explained that she originally wanted Judith Barker, until she was cast as Agatha Finn. She then suggested that Susan George would be "great". When asked about her favourite qualities of Rhona, Henry said that she "admires her sense of fun and her inner strength", and described Rhona as a "lioness". Henry added that she has felt "exhausted" by some of the storylines that her character has been part of, but that she does not "wish any of them hadn't happened", and does not regret the effort she put into them. On the various relationships that her character has been part of, Henry stated that Rhona "could rekindle things with Marlon, which would be amazing for Leo, and for April, as Rhona is the closest she has to a mother", but stated that she enjoyed working with all of the actors Rhona has romances with.

On 29 January 2022, Louise Jameson cast as Rhona's mother, Mary Goskirk. Jameson described her casting as a gift and said that playing Henry's on-screen mother was "the icing on the cake". She was billed as a domineering, feisty and "no-nonsense character" with a sharp wit and stubbornness that would challenge Rhona. Upon Mary's introduction, she "bursts onto the scene at a critical point in her daughter's life" since Rhona is dealing with memories of her rapist, Pierce Harris (Jonathan Wrather). It transpires that Mary and Rhona share a strained relationship due to Rhona feeling like she has never been good enough for her mother. However, Digital Spy noted that Mary arriving at the time of Rhona's struggles could benefit their relationship, serving as an opportunity for them to bond.

== Storylines ==
=== 2001–2002 ===
Rhona first appeared in the village in September 2001 as a locum, helping Paddy Kirk (Dominic Brunt) and covering for Zoe Tate (Leah Bracknell), whilst she was on holiday. She begins dating with local chef Marlon Dingle (Mark Charnock) in light of his ex-girlfriend, Tricia Fisher (Sheree Murphy), departing the village after their relationship had ended. However, Tricia soon reappeared and Rhona left not long after. Rhona returned in June 2002 to cover for Zoe as she was incapable of work, due to mental illness. She and Marlon soon resumed their relationship and realized they had several shared interests, including Laurel and Hardy films and design. When Tricia found out, she was very upset but Rhona left again in December.

=== 2010–present ===
Rhona returned in 2010, covering for Paddy after his foster son Aaron Livesy (Danny Miller) attacked him. Rhona stayed for a few weeks and clashed with receptionist Pearl Ladderbanks (Meg Johnson), as she wanted to protect Paddy. It was later revealed that in her absence, Rhona had married and divorced. Rhona completed her contract and left but returned when Paddy needed to care for Aaron, following his suicide attempt. As no one knew how long Aaron's recovery might take, Rhona stayed with Andy Sugden (Kelvin Fletcher) and Ryan Lamb (James Sutton) but moved in with Marlon, Bob Hope (Tony Audenshaw) and Lizzie Lakely (Kitty McGeever). She left when she realised she was in love with Paddy. She confided in Laurel Thomas (Charlotte Bellamy) that her relationship with Paddy had become difficult and was seriously considering leaving so Laurel told Paddy to sort things out with her before she left.

Rhona discovered she was expecting Marlon's baby. When she learns that the baby has Down's syndrome, she considers a termination but decides not to after talking to Hazel Rhodes (Pauline Quirke). On 1 February, she has a scan and discovers that the sonographer is an old school friend, Stephanie Ray, and she tells Paddy and Marlon that Rhona was very rebellious when she was at school. Rhona tries to set Marlon and Stephanie up but he wasn't keen. Marlon decided that they should try pregnancy yoga and Rhona agrees but decides to go alone, because Marlon is very irritating. She has another scan in March and is told everything is fine but is so worried that they visit a Down syndrome support group. In April, she and Paddy tell Aaron about the baby's condition and are touched by his reaction. She gets Braxton Hicks Contractions twice before giving birth to a boy they name Leo.

Rhona starts to make plans to propose. However, Paddy gets drunk and Rhona cannot go through with it. Paddy tells Rhona that he feels getting married is unnecessary but proposes when he feels guilty and she accepts. Paddy is offered a job in New Zealand and he and Rhona agree to go but Marlon refuses to let them take Leo. Consequently, Paddy and Rhona ask Marlon to go with them and he agrees but later changes his mind. Rhona tells Marlon that she is still taking Leo but Marlon tells them that he has taken legal action to stop them. After a lot of debate between Rhona and Laurel about taking Leo to New Zealand, Rhona and Leo leave but Paddy has to stay after being arrested for assaulting a police officer. Rhona and Leo return after Marlon tells Paddy to tell Rhona to come back voluntarily or be forced to return as they have another court date. Paddy's licence to practice as a vet is suspended because of his arrest so Rhona's old friend, Vanessa Woodfield (Michelle Hardwick), helps out but she annoys Paddy. However, Vanessa buys a share in the surgery and when Paddy is able to return, he, Rhona and Vanessa all have their names above the door.

Rhona's life takes a turn for the worse when she becomes addicted to the painkillers prescribed for a back injury. Like many addicts, her personality changes and she becomes aggressive. Vanessa sees Rhona raid the surgery's drugs cabinet, warning her of the penalties if she is caught. Rhona apologises and hides while Leo cries in his cot. Vanessa sees this and is shocked by Rhona's state. She tells her that Leo is fine before giving her a pill to make her feel better. This helps initially but Rhona's dependence worsens dramatically. Vanessa tries to help Rhona wean herself off the painkillers and confesses that she has fallen in love with Rhona. Rhona initially spurns her affection before giving in as Vanessa is now her dealer but also buys drugs from a dealer named Gary. Paddy and others are suspicious of Rhona's odd behaviour. Paddy checks her phone and sees that she is contacting Gary and lying about where she goes. When he confronts her and grabs her phone, Rhona screams and attacks Paddy before demanding that he leave. However, Rhona's addiction leads her to put herself and others in danger as when visiting different pharmacies to get painkillers, she and Laurel are carjacked by Ross Barton (Michael Parr). Rhona is also unaware of the damage that the drugs are doing to her body and only realises when she is rushed to hospital after collapsing. The doctor tells her that her kidneys are about to collapse so Marlon, feeling Paddy has to look after Rhona, removes Leo. Losing residency of her son and attending rehab help Rhona get and stay clean.

After Vanessa brings her son, Johnny, home from hospital, Rhona realises that she wants another baby. As she has not got pregnant again, she decides to adopt and discusses it with Paddy. He agrees and the references selected by Paddy and Rhona include Aaron, Pearl and Leo's teacher, Tess Harris (Nicola Stephenson). Tess befriends Rhona and tells her that she is in love with a married man. Rhona encourages Tess to go for it, saying life is too short but after Tess dies, Rhona learns that Paddy is Tess's married man. Initially Rhona insists on carrying on as normal but soon realises that she and Paddy cannot stay together, let alone adopt a child, as things are so bad between them that they didn't realise that Leo was hurting April.

In March 2016, Rhona tells Pierce Harris (Jonathan Wrather), Tess' widower, that Paddy was Tess' lover so Pierce punched Paddy. Later, Rhona discover Aaron and Chas knew that Paddy was having an affair. Not long afterwards, Rhona gets involved with Pierce who harbours a dark secret. Initially her friends and family think this a bad idea but come round when they see that Pierce and Rhona are happy together. In October, after Rhona and Pierce argue, she goes camping with Paddy, Marlon and Leo. However, Pierce arrives and they argue again. After Pierce leaves, Paddy and Rhona go after him and are involved in a pile up, caused by Emma Barton (Gillian Kearney) pushing her husband, James (Bill Ward), from a bridge. Rhona and Paddy are badly injured but they all survive and Rhona continues her relationship with Pierce.

In January 2017, Rhona and Pierce's relationship takes a sinister turn when Pierce forces himself on Rhona. After this, Rhona is left in a state of confusion and probable shock, suggesting Rhona did not give her explicit consent. A month later, despite Pierce forcing himself on her for a second time, she agrees to marry him on Valentine's Day, although she has shared a kiss with Paddy. Pierce overhears Rhona and Paddy discussing the kiss, unaware that Pierce has overheard; On her wedding day, Paddy gives Rhona his mother's necklace and she and Pierce marry. Pierce shows Rhona information of a Lake District veterinary practice lease, but Rhona is surprised he acquired it without discussion and, when Pierce suggests Rhona is not over Paddy, Rhona admits she drunkenly kissed Paddy. He insults her so she attempts to flee the house, however, Pierce drags her back in the house and jealously rips the necklace off. Losing control, Pierce pushes Rhona to the floor and proceeds to rape her. He attempts to shift the blame onto Rhona but, under pretence of showering, a shocked Rhona escapes the house, goes to the police station and reports her rape. Rhona is taken to a Sexual Assault Referral Centre, where she is examined. Rhona leaves during the interview and orders Pierce to get out or she'll phone the police. Rhona almost confides in Marlon, later, after putting Leo to bed, she breaks down on the stairs. Pierce tells her things will be worse if she does tell the police.

Rhona meets Pierce's mother Martha after the truth comes out, and Martha gives insight into Pierce's troubled mindset due to his father's death when he was young. At Pierce's trial, his defense suggests Rhona is lying about the rape as the couple enjoyed "rough" sexual intercourse. As it appears the jury is swayed in Pierce's favour, he is ultimately found guilty of his crime and later sentenced to a period of jail time. Rhona is allowed to visit Pierce in prison, and he acknowledges his actions and apologises to Rhona, who rejects the apology and in return declares she is free of him at last.

It takes Rhona some time to get over her ordeal, but in early 2018, she falls for farmhand Pete Barton (Anthony Quinlan), whom Leo quickly becomes attached to. Pete even tries his hand at learning Makaton to communicate with Leo. Rhona and Pete get engaged and after Pete's brother, Ross, leaves the village, he gives up their old house and moves into Smithy Cottage. In February 2019, while out on a call to Butler's Farm concerning the animals there, Rhona is run over by faulty farming machinery operated by Pete's cousin, Matty Barton (Ash Palmisciano). The accident leaves Rhona gravely injured, and an operation she needs in order to stand a chance of fully recovering would render her unlikely to have children again, which strains Rhona's relationship with Pete as she worries he will want more children after they marry. Rhona confides her worries in businesswoman Kim Tate (Claire King), with whom she becomes friends. However, Kim has an ulterior motive; her former stepdaughter Zoe (Leah Bracknell) used to be part-owner of the vets, in business with Paddy, and now Kim wants to buy into the vet's, which is in financial straits, so she can employ her son - Jamie (Alexander Lincoln). When Rhona thereafter realises Kim's plan, she rebuffs her - so Kim tries to seduce Pete. Though the pair never go beyond a kiss, Rhona feels betrayed and her relationship suffers further. On a night out with several other villagers in April 2019, Rhona kisses a stranger called Nate Robinson (Jurell Carter) after the pair get talking at the bar. The encounter leaves Rhona feeling guilty and she eventually tells Pete. After several months of difficulty, in June 2019, Rhona and Pete end their engagement and relationship. Pete moves in to Butler's Farm, but he and Rhona maintain a close friendship and Leo is still allowed to see Pete too.

In October 2019, Rhona starts seeing Kim's associate Graham Foster (Andrew Scarborough) - unaware that the pair have had a casual sexual relationship for several years. Kim's jealousy swells to the point that she tries sabotaging Rhona and Graham's relationship several times, until during a Halloween party in the Woolpack, Kim spills the beans on her and Graham's affair, insulting Rhona and warning her to stay away. In return, Graham angrily reveals that Jamie dobbed his mother in with the police for her criminal activities several years previously, which earned her a spell in prison. After the big reveal, Graham commits himself to Rhona and they make their relationship official - with Kim swearing revenge against them both.

In January 2020, Rhona is devastated to learn that Graham has been murdered and quickly suspects Kim to be the perpetrator - most notably after learning that Kim wanted Graham dead. She soon begins to doubt her theories on Kim, however, when Rhona learns that Pierce has been released from prison not long ago. Eventually, Rhona deduces that Pierce killed Graham upon learning that her ex-husband has been stalking her ever since he had been released from prison. Moreover, Pierce has kidnapped Vanessa and Johnny to force Rhona to meet him face-to-face - and she does so after finding out about the situation. When Rhona meets Pierce face-to-face for the first time since before he went to prison two years ago, she secretly records him admit to killing Graham - all the while the recording is being streamed live in front of Paddy and the other punters in The Woolpack. Paddy instantly phones the police just as Pierce knocks out Kim, after the latter arrived to help Rhona extract proof about the culprit behind Graham's murder. When the police arrive moments later, Pierce prevents Rhona from escaping and attempts to rape her again; however, she fights back by injecting an animal needle on Pierce to subdue him. As Pierce lies helpless and injured, Rhona lectures him for what he put her through by raping her and killing Graham. The police then besiege the building and Pierce, after being identified by his ex-wife as Graham's killer, is arrested for murder and kidnap; he is later charged for his crimes and consequently jailed once more, thus allowing Rhona to finally lay Pierce to rest from her life. Her efforts to move on from Graham become troubled when Kim arranges for his funeral to proceed without Rhona's knowledge, which restarts their conflict in the process. Rhona then learns that Graham left her a lot of money in his will and not Kim. She decides to keep it and use it to help Moira with her farming troubles, much to Kim's frustration.

== Reception ==
In August 2017, Henry was longlisted for Best Actress at the Inside Soap Awards. The nomination made the viewer-voted shortlist, although Henry lost out to Lucy Fallon, who portrays Bethany Platt in Coronation Street. Henry was nominated for the same award at the 2024 Inside Soap Awards, whereas "Rhona's battle for baby Ivy" was longlisted for "Best Storyline".
