= Suzy Merton =

- Emmerdale character
- Portrayed by: Martelle Edinborough
- Duration: 2022–2025
- First appearance: 30 March 2022
- Last appearance: 6 March 2025
- Introduced by: Jane Hudson
In-universe information
- Occupation: Event and wedding planner

Suzy Merton is a fictional character from the British soap opera Emmerdale, played by Martelle Edinborough. She made her first appearance on 30 March 2022. Edinborough had previously appeared in Emmerdale in 2018 and was excited to be cast on the soap again, calling it a dream job. Edinborough almost fainted when found out she secured the role of Suzy. The character was introduced as a love interest for Vanessa Woodfield (Michelle Hardwick), but soon after her introduction it was revealed that Suzy had a secret link to Leyla Harding (Roxy Shahidi) as part of her new storyline. It is later revealed that the pair have been doing cocaine together. Suzy was also given a surprise link to former character Holly Barton (Sophie Powles), who died of a drug overdose. The other villagers shun Suzy after it is revealed that she gave Holly the money to buy drugs on the night that she died and Vanessa breaks up with her. They later get back together but break up again when Vanessa leaves for a job out of the village. Suzy is later given a new love interest, Mary Goskirk (Louise Jameson), and the pair develop feelings for each other. However, their feelings do not turn into a relationship and Suzy gets back together with Vanessa, creating a love triangle. Suzy's other storylines have focused on her friendship with Leyla and getting attacked. For her role as Suzy, Edinborough was longlisted for "Best Newcomer" at the 2022 Inside Soap Awards. Suzy and Mary's potential romance has received mixed reviews from fans. Suzy was killed off during the episode broadcast on 17 February 2025 after being involved in a limousine crash.

== Casting ==
On 29 March 2022, it was announced that Martelle Edinborough had been cast as Suzy Merton, a love interest for Vanessa Woodfield (Michelle Hardwick) who would "shake things up". Suzy made a brief appearance on 30 March 2022 and then reappeared the following week. Speaking about joining the soap, Edinborough explained, ""My feet haven't quite touched the ground yet, I'm still on this massive cloud high up in the sky, but it's been going really, really good. It's just like a family, and it sounds so cliché but it really is and everyone is so lovely and welcoming and helps you settle in really nicely." Edinborough found the beginning of her Emmerdale experience "just amazing" and believed that Suzy was a "really fun" character to play and was looking forward to what would come up for her. Edinborough called Suzy a "a whirlwind of fun", explaining that she is gregarious, confident and "fun to be around", but also does not take any nonsense and likes to get what she wants. Edinborough was "absolutely over the moon and overjoyed" to secure the role, revealing that her agent told her she had received the part. Edinborough is from Yorkshire and found it "perfect" working in Emmerdale due to it being close to Leeds, where she lives. She called working on the soap a dream job, asking "What actor from Yorkshire doesn't want to work on Emmerdale?" Edinborough had previously portrayed a doctor in Emmerdale in 2018 and had also appeared in two other soap operas, Hollyoaks and Coronation Street.

== Development ==
=== Introduction and romance ===
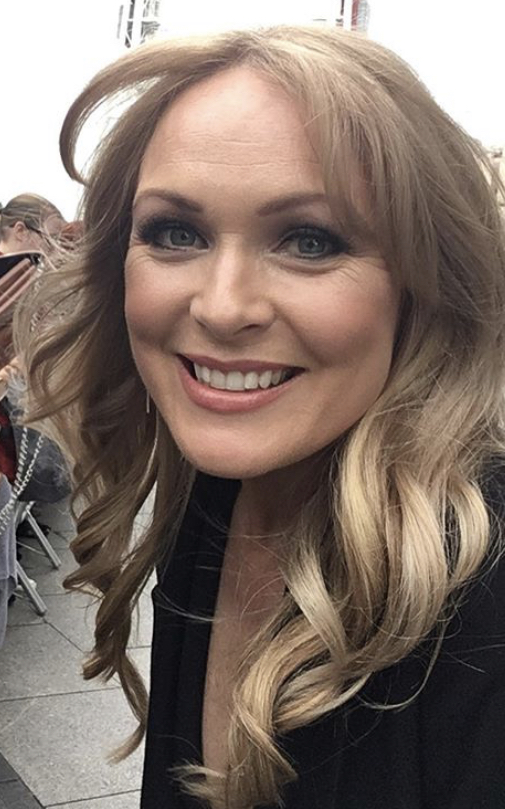
Michelle Hardwick portrays Vanessa Woodfield, Suzy's original love interest.

Suzy was introduced as a love interest for Vanessa Woodfield (Michelle Hardwick). Edinborough teased that romance could be possible for the two women, explaining that "there is definitely an attraction there. So there is potential for something romantic". The actress believed that "Suzy is pleasantly surprised with Vanessa" and added that the later has "something about her that Suzy likes and she's not quite sure what as yet". Vanessa initially bumps into Suzy and ruins the cake that she is carrying. They then bump into each other again the following week, where they flirt and plan a dinner date, which secretly pleases a delighted Vanessa. However, on the day of the date, Vanessa is forced to stay home to look after her sick son and is unable to contact Suzy due to her phone being broken, so Vanessa goes on a "mission" to make amends with Suzy after standing her up and the pair go to a wine tasting. The two later become girlfriends.

=== Drug link to Leyla ===
Shortly after Suzy's debut, it was teased that the character had a "surprise link" to established character Leyla Harding (Roxy Shahidi), with it being reported by Digital Spy that she would be "playing a role" in Leyla's "mysterious" storyline. Emmerdale producer Laura Shaw had previously teased an upcoming "big" storyline for Leyla, suggesting that Leyla may not be coping as well as she appears and that something about her would be uncovered. In the storyline, Leyla, who has been taking "cryptic" phone calls, is shocked and "visibly rattled" when she sees Suzy drinking with Vanessa at The Woolpack on their date, with Suzy telling Vanessa that they know each other through work. Things become "awkward" when Suzy later tells a shaken Leyla that she will keep her secrets, but Leyla insists that Suzy should not be in Emmerdale or dating Vanessa. Leyla becomes worried when Vanessa toasts to going on more dates with Suzy. Charlotte Tutton from the Daily Mirror speculated that Leyla and Suzy were hiding something "huge".

The mystery about their connection is solved when it is revealed that Leyla has developed a "worrying drug habit". Shahidi explained that Leyla used to use drugs recreationally at times in her past, and she then threw herself into work "as a way of escaping the painful situation" of Leyla's husband, Liam Cavanagh's (Jonny McPherson), grief over his murdered daughter, Leanna Cavanagh (Mimi Slinger), which led to her collaborating with Suzy, who plan events. Suzy would provide and use cocaine on the "party scene", which Leyla began to do at times "with more and more frequency". Shahidi revealed that it is "terrifying" for Leyla to have Suzy in the village, explaining, "It'd almost be like having your mistress and your wife in the same room! With the proximity of Suzy, Leyla fears that she's closer to being caught or exposed. When what she did with Suzy was safely tucked away and separate, Leyla could compartmentalise that. With Suzy now being in her home, in her local pub, sat talking to her husband, Leyla feels that she'll be less able to do that". Shahidi believed that viewers would be "utterly shocked" by the "really good twist". The truth about the connection is revealed when Suzy begins collaborating with Leyla and Priya Sharma (Fiona Wade) on their wedding planning business Take a Vow, and the three are delighted when Suzy secures the business of a "potentially lucrative client", which leads to Suzy and Leyla later meeting separately and celebrating by taking drugs. Their secret is almost exposed when Vanessa walks in whilst Leyla is doing drugs on the desk. Leyla's drugs also result in Laurel Thomas (Charlotte Bellamy) breaking up with Jai Sharma (Chris Bisson) when the drugs are found next to his wallet.

=== Connection to Holly ===
It is later revealed that Suzy also has a connection to former character Holly Barton (Sophie Powles), who was killed off in 2016 from a drug overdose. The connection is revealed to Holly's mother, Moira Barton (Natalie J. Robb), and other villagers during a business presentation, as the slideshow features a photo of Holly with Suzy wearing the same outfit that she wore on the night she died. Vanessa tries to cover for Suzy, who tells an upset Moira – who had no idea that Suzy knew her daughter – that she only gave Holly a photography gigs at the wedding. Moira remains unsettled and she and Jai, who loved Holly, beg her to tell them what happened on Holly's last night, but Suzy claims that she left early and did not see what set Holly off. However, Suzy later tells Vanessa she gave Holly the money to get drugs "to treat herself" on the night of her death and also fired her from her job as she did not want to feed her habit, which leaves Vanessa horrified and angry. Suzy puts pressure on Vanessa to keep her secret "for everyone's sake". Meanwhile, Moira apologises to Suzy and, not knowing the truth, tells her Holly's death is not her fault, and asks her to share memories of her friendship with Holly.

Following the reveal, a "dark cloud" hangs over Emmerdale and Suzy has to face the consequences of her actions, with the other villagers talking about her, including Leyla, who joins in insulting Suzy without admitting her own mistake or their connection. Also facing harsh words from Vanessa and Jai, Suzy feels like she has lost everything but despite Leyla's "harsh words", she takes the fall for the packet of drugs that Jai was blamed for, despite them being Leyla's. A "scorned" Suzy then gives Leyla a "scary" warning, telling her that she is addicted to cocaine and that the drugs have changed her, in addition to the fact that she is playing a "dangerous game" by hiding the addiction from her loved ones. Suzy is also angry at Leyla as she wanted to tell Moira about her connection to Holly as soon as she found out, but Leyla talked her out of it.

=== Attack ===
In March 2023, Suzy is "brutally" attacked by Leyla's former drug dealer, Callum Matthews (Tom Ashley) when she tries protecting her best friend after they come across Callum in a nightclub. Leyla wants Callum to pay for stabbing her son a few weeks prior, so she sparks his "downfall" by recording him making a drug deal at the club. When Callum is arrested, Leyla reveals she gave the footage to the police and Callum responds by threatening Jacob again, which makes Suzy nervous. Suzy tries to help Leyla and plans to take Callum down by making his associates think he is a grass, but the risky plan leads to Callum attacking Suzy with a brick. Shahidi explained, "When Suzy first makes her plan, Leyla is desperate at this point. Leyla is terrified of doing something that's going to make the situation worse. But equally, she feels like she's powerless and out of options, so they have to do something". Suzy is found unconscious and is taken to hospital, where she later regains consciousness. Leyla's "sense of injustice" increases when she learns that Callum has an alibi and when Suzy wakes up she is terrified that Callum will come to "finish the job". Shahidi explained that Leyla blames herself for Suzy getting attacked as Suzy stepped in to "save the mess that Leyla had created". Leyla tells Suzy to not worry as she will take action, with Shahidi teasing that Leyla is aware that "she has to do something to stop Callum", even if she does not know what that is. Suzy is later annoyed when Leyla does not show up to picking her up from the hospital, but she then realises that Leyla is missing, as she has been kidnapped by Callum, and is "filled with dread".

=== Love triangle ===
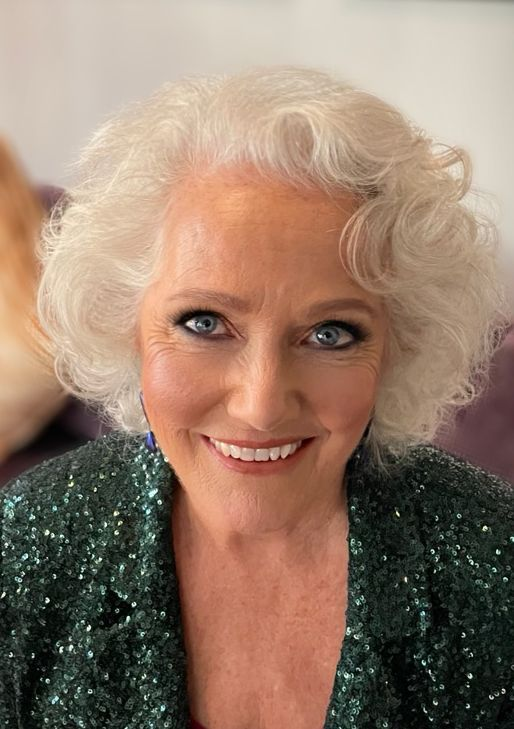
Louise Jameson portrays Mary Goskirk, who Suzy develops feelings for in 2024.

In January 2024, a romance between Suzy and Mary Goskirk (Louise Jameson) was teased when they share a "charged moment" in the 2024 New Years Day episode. The episode saw Suzy visiting Mary to chat about the previous year, with Suzy telling Mary that she is there for to "offload" to and they make a plan to meet again before exchanging a long look. Before Suzy leaves, she tells Mary that she hopes 2024 will be good for "both" of them. Jameson had previously teased that there would be a romantic development for Mary in 2024, but admitted that she did not want her character to settle down. Suzy and Mary had already established a friendship, and in 2023 Suzy had warned Mary about her love interest Faye Helders (Jane Gurnett), who Suzy correctly guessed was trying to con Mary out of money. Mary had also been the one to phone an ambulance for Suzy after finding her unconscious due to Callum's attack.

Mary develops a crush on Suzy and they grow closer, but their future faces a "setback" as Mary does not tell Suzy about her feelings due to Vanessa's return to the village. Suzy and Vanessa end up sharing a kiss and Suzy sleeps on Vanessa's sofa. Suzy reluctantly agrees to spending more time with Vanessa, and Mary is further discouraged when Vanessa, who is oblivious to Mary's feelings, tells her that she is hopeful of reuniting with Suzy. Meanwhile, Suzy admits to Leyla that she is unsure about having spent the night with Vanessa as she has feelings for Mary, but admits that her and Mary would be a "leap in the dark". Suzy tries to tell Mary about her feelings, but Mary cuts her off and tells her that she fine with her spending more time with Vanessa. Suzy tries to get Mary to open up is disappointed when she lies that she only thinks of Suzy as a friend, although she confides in Kim Tate (Claire King) that she is actually heartbroken. Suzy then agrees with Leyla that Vanessa is a better match for her. Hardwick admitted that Suzy was her favourite of Vanessa's love interests and called Suzy "cool" and the polar opposite of Vanessa's "geeky' personality, with Hardwick believing that the two would have an "exciting journey" ahead.

== Storylines ==
Suzy is walking into the path of Vanessa Woodfield's (Michelle Hardwick) moving car and ends up dropping her gender reveal cake. Suzy and Vanessa get into an argument and Suzy storms off. The following week, Suzy - who is looking for Priya Sharma (Fiona Wade) - bumps into Vanessa at The Woolpack, who buys her a drink. They end up flirting and arrange a date. However, on the evening of the date, Vanessa's son Johnny Woodfield (Jack Jennings) falls ill and Suzy is unable to contact Suzy due to her phone being broken. Thinking she has been stood up, Suzy goes to Vanessa's house and Vanessa explains the situation, so they rearrange the date. They end up going to a wine tasting and then to the Woolpack, where they bump into Leyla Harding (Roxy Shahidi). Suzy and Leyla are surprised to see each other and Suzy assures Leyla that she will keep her secret. It is revealed that the two take cocaine together. Suzy begins working at Take A Vow.

Suzy meets Moira Barton (Natalie J. Robb) and realises that she knew her daughter Holly Barton (Sophie Powles), who died of a drug overdose. Suzy feels responsible for her death as she gave her the money for the drugs on the night of her death. Suzy decides to quit drugs and urges Leyla to do the same. During Suzy's presentation at Take A Vow, a photo with Holly comes up, leading to Moira and other villagers finding out that Suzy knew Holly. Suzy confides to Vanessa the truth about how she gave Holly the drugs and she is horrified, and Moira later finds out too. The other villagers shun Suzy and Vanessa breaks up with. Vanessa struggles in the breakup and Moira tells Vanessa that whilst she does not forgive Suzy, she will not be in the way to their romance. Vanessa and Suzy get back together but their relationship remains strained. Vanessa is offered a dream job in Canada and Suzy encourages her to take it, saying that she will move with her. However, they decide that it will be best if Suzy does not come and they break up.

Suzy is shocked to bump into Vanessa, who has returned to the village. They both get drunk and kiss, but Vanessa later makes it clear that it is too complicated for them to get back together. At the same time, Mary Goskirk (Louise Jameson) has a crush on Suzy, but she does not tell her feelings. Vanessa tries to win Suzy back by singing a song to her at the Woolpack Karaoke night and tells her that she is ready to get back with her. However, Suzy confides to Leyla that she is unsure as she has feelings for Mary. Suzy goes to tell Mary her feelings, but Mary cuts her off and lies that she only sees her as a friend, which disappoints Suzy. However, Mary is secretly saddened and cries when she sees Suzy and Vanessa kissing.

Suzy died on Valentine's Day in which was supposed to be a celebration after Kerry Wyatt wins a limo. Two limos purchased collided in a horrifying collision, hitting her head hard in the roof near the frozen lake.

== Reception ==
For her role as Suzy, Edinborough was longlisted for "Best Newcomer" at the 2022 Inside Soap Awards. The Limo crash disaster was longlisted for "Best Showstopper" at the 2025 Inside Soap Awards.

Shauna Bannon Ward from RSVP LIVE believed that Vanessa and Suzy had a Meet cute introduction. Susannah Alexander from Digital Spy believed that Suzy and Vanessa had a "slightly mortifying" introduction, but speculated that it could be the beginning of a "beautiful new romance" for Vanessa. Justin Harp from the same website wrote that Leyla and Suzy bumping into each other during Suzy's date with Vanessa was an "unhappy reunion". Harp also called the reveal of Suzy's connection to Holly "dramatic" and thought Moira was "rightfully upset" that Suzy kept the fact that she knew Holly a secret. In December 2022, Laura-Jayne Tyler from Inside Soap questioned who or what Suzy was now for due to Leyla being in rehab and Vanessa having left for Canada, with Tyler urging the soap to not "waste" Suzy's character. In May 2023, Monde Mwitumwa from Leeds Live reported on how fans were happy that the actress would be returning to film on the soap following her recent surgery. Calli Kitson from Metro also reported the same and wrote, "Welcome back Martelle!"

Following Mary and Suzy's New Years Day chat, Susannah Alexander from Digital Spy speculated that it could be the start of a romance between the pair. Alexander reported how the interaction "go unnoticed by viewers", with some fans writing on social media that they had noticed something between the characters in the episode and others supporting the potential new pairing. Alexander also called Suzy "sympathetic" after she told Mary that she could always offload to her. Joel Harley from Entertainment Daily reported how fans were divided by the potential romance and were debating on social media, with some believing that it is a "terrible match" whilst others thought that they had "sizzling chemistry" and would be well suited together. Harley also reported how fans were theorising about a love triangle between Mary, Suzy and Vanessa, and questioned whether Suzy and Mary would be a "match made in heaven" or a terrible idea. Harley's colleague, Tamzin Meyer, reported that fans were "delighted" and "over the moon" when Suzy confessed that she has feelings for Mary, as they were hopeful that they would eventually become a couple, with fans sharing their views on social media. Meyer also believed that Mary was left "kicking herself" after rejecting Suzy. Tyler from Inside Soap wrote, "So, Suzy had the hots for Mary after all? And Mary's silently burying her love? For Mercy's sake, someone do something!" Monde Mwitumwa from Leeds Live reported how some fans were not happy about Suzy getting back together with Vanessa as they believed that Suzy has more chemistry with Mary.
