= Jay Taylor (actor) =

English actor

- Born: James Taylor; 16 October 1983 (age 42); Bromley, London, England
- Occupation: Actor / Director
- Years active: 2007–present

Jay Taylor (born 16 October 1983) is an English actor. He is best known for the role of Marcus in the 2008 British Thriller film Donkey Punch, as well as voicing the character Reyn in Xenoblade Chronicles.

== Early life and education ==
Taylor was born in Bromley, the son of a BBC TV producer. His brother is a 1st assistant director and fashion / photo journalism photographer. He was educated at the Ravens Wood School for Boys in Bromley. He then went on to train at The Royal Academy of Dramatic Art (RADA), graduating in 2006. Taylor lives in London.

== Career ==
Taylor´s acting career began in 2007 when he appeared as Jonathan Fox in the BBC TV series, Holby City and then portrayed Evan Davies in the TV film, Daphne. In the same year he was cast as drug dealer Chris Wrightman in the English crime film, Rise of the Footsoldier, based on the life of former Inter City Firm football hooligan turned underworld gang member, Carlton Leach. In 2008, Taylor co-starred alongside Jaime Winstone, Julian Morris, Nichola Burley, Robert Boulter, Sian Breckin and Tom Burke in Olly Blackburn´s directoral debut, Donkey Punch, playing the role of Marcus. Donkey Punch was critically honoured at its appearance at the Sundance Film Festival.

In the same year, Taylor also played the recurring role of Dan Cox in a number of episodes in the ITV production of The Bill, and in The Fixer. Taylor appeared in series 3 of Misfits. Jay has also appeared in: George Lucas' second world war epic 'Red Tails'; the Glasgow Citizens Theatre production of 'A Clockwork Orange'; BBC Four's Mills & Boon biopic 'Consuming Passion: 100 Years of Mills & Boon'; the Channel 4 comedy 'Sirens'; BBC comedy 'Teaboys; and in 'A Fantastic Fear of Everything'. Taylor has also directed three short films, Homecoming, Laura and London Bridge.

== Filmography ==
=== Film ===
Year	Title	Role	Notes
2007	Rise of the Footsoldier	Chris Wightman	
2008	Donkey Punch	Marcus	
2011	Blooded	Activist	
2012	Good Night	Ian	Short film
2012	A Fantastic Fear of Everything	Beat Cops Filmmaker	
2013	Homecoming	Man	Short film. Also writer and director
2013	Laura	–	Short film. Writer and director
2013	London Bridge	–	Short video. Writer and director
2014	Promise	Nigel	Short films
2018	Inanimate	Patrick (voice)	Short films
2020	The Last Kick	Tom	Short films
2022	Wolf Manor	Steve	
2023	Evie: Has a New Name	Tony	
2024	Broken Bird	Mark	
2024	OK/NOTOK	Zane	Short film

=== Television ===
Year	Title	Role	Notes
2007	Daphne	Evan Davis / Actor, 'September Tide'	Television film
2007	Holby City	Johnathan Fox	Series 9; episode 27: "For Whom the Bell Tolls"
2008	The Fixer	Jude Cassidy	Series 1; episode 2
2008	The Bill	Dan Cox	Series 24; episodes 54, 55, 64 & 65
2008	Consuming Passion: 100 Years of Mills & Boon	Joseph Henley	Television film
2011	Casualty	Simon Roper	Series 25; episode 39: "One Good Day"
2011	Sirens	David	Episode 6: "Cry"
2011	Misfits	Mark	Series 3; episode 2
2011	Horizon	Himself - Narrator (voice)	Series 48; episode 12: "The Core"
2012	Midsomer Murders	Peter Groves	Series 15; episode 3: "Written in the Stars"
2013	Holby City	Gareth Mason	Series 16; episode 2: "Friends Like You"
2014	Silk	Dean Trent	Series 3; episode 2: "Big Fish, Small Pond"
2017	Prime Suspect 1973	David Bentley	Mini-series; episodes 1–6
2018	Britannia	Roman Deserter 3	Series 1; episode 1: "Woe to the Vanquished"
2019	Manhunt	DI Chris Saunders	Series 1; episodes 1–3
2022	Ten Percent	First AD	Episode 4
2023	Father Brown	George Kavanagh	Series 10; episode 10: "The Serpent Within"
2025	Sister Boniface Mysteries	DI Jack Stagg	Series 4; episode 6: "There's No 'I' in Slaughter"

=== Video games ===
Year	Title	Role	Notes
2010	Xenoblade Chronicles	Reyn (voice)	English versions
2015	Xenoblade Chronicles 3D	Reyn (voice)	English versions
2019	Blood & Truth	Nick Marks (voice)	
2022	Horizon Forbidden West	–	Additional motion capture performer
2023	Baldur's Gate 3	Borgus Elamin / Burrock / Fist Ivarus / Various (voice)	
2024	Black Myth: Wukong	Yaksha King (voice)	
