= Building the Wall =

Play

Building the Wall is a play written by Pulitzer and Tony Award winning writer, Robert Schenkkan, in October, 2016, right before Donald Trump won the 2016 United States presidential election. This play is a dystopian fiction on the potential consequences of the incendiary racial rhetoric of the then Republican candidate on American immigration policy.

== Plot summary ==
The play consists of two characters, Rick and Gloria. Rick, the former head of a private detention center for illegal immigrants in West Texas, has been arrested and convicted of serious but (for the audience) unspecified crimes, and is awaiting sentencing. Gloria, an African-American historian, is the first person to whom Rick has granted an interview. A cat and mouse game ensues as Gloria tries to get Rick to explain what really happened under his watch and who should bear responsibility. Robert Schenkkan wrote this play in "white hot fury". While the plot of Building The Wall concerns a fictional crime against humanity set against the backdrop of immigration policies on the southern border, the thematic concern is the slippery moral slope by which otherwise well-intentioned people gradually find themselves crossing legal and moral lines until tragedy ensues.

== Characters ==
Rick is a middle-aged, white man from central Texas who served in the Army as part of the Military Police. Upon returning to the States, he married, and began a career in private law enforcement, eventually becoming head of a private detention center in West Texas. Self-declared apolitical, he became a supporter of Donald Trump during the campaign, feeling that in this candidate he had found a new kind of politician who understood how the middle-class had suffered under politics as usual. He is proud of his roots, denies any taint of racism, and believes that he has, to some extent, been set-up by the "powers that be." Gloria is an African-American woman, also from the South, who is a rising star as a historian in academic circles. As a historian, her focus has been on what she calls "hinge points of history," turning points that profoundly shape events. She wrestles with the question of what sets these events in motion? A Great Man on a White Horse? Hegelian cycles? Or ordinary people in a moment of decision. Gloria believes that the country is in one of those moments right now and that understanding Rick, and what he did, is critical to understanding where we are as a country.

== Production ==
The play opened in Los Angeles on March 18, 2017 directed by Michael Michetti with Bo Foxworth as Rick and Judith Moreland as Gloria as part of the National New Play Network Rolling World Premier with additional simultaneous productions at the Curious Theater (CO), the Forum Theater (Washington, DC), Borderlands Theater (AZ), and the City Theater (Fl). The Los Angeles production was extended twice and ran for six months. It opened in New York on May 21, 2017 as a commercial production at New World Stages in New York City, for a predetermined run lasting through July 9, 2017. The director was Ari Edelson, with sets by Antje Ellermann, music by Basrt Fasbender. and lighting by Tyler Micoleau; "Rick" was played by James Badge Dale, and "Gloria" by Tamara Tunie.

The European premier was held at Theater Drachengasse in Vienna on September 25, 2017. Directed by Joanna Godwin-Seidl with Flo Wilson as Gloria and Dave Moskin as Rick.

The play is available in print in an acting edition published by Dramatists Play Service as "Building the Wall", and in a trade paperback edition as Building the Wall: The Play and Commentary with afterwords by Douglas S. Massey, Julian E. Zelize, and Timothy Patrick McCarthy (New York : Arcade Publishing, 2017 ISBN 9781628728774)

== Reception ==
As would be expected of such a controversial play, critical reception varied dramatically. Charles McNulty of the LA Times declared, “Step by step, Schenkkan gets us to see the way the collapse of institutions leads to the collapse of morality and the rule of law. ‘Building the Wall’ conjures what appears to be a worst-case scenario, though who would dare presume to know what the worst-case scenario even is anymore?” Jesse Green of the New York Times found the play "too becalmed to be agitprop. It’s just propaganda — by which I mean that it soothes instead of arouses." Frank Rizo for Variety found it a "hot-off-the-laptop scorcher" with a "a hold-your-breath inevitability"
