= Flo Wilson =

English actress (born 1963)

- Born: 11 February 1963 (age 63); Manchester, England
- Occupation: Actress
- Years active: 1991–present
- Television: Coronation Street; In the Club; Sanditon; Emmerdale

Flo Wilson (born 11 February 1963) is an English actress, known for portraying the role of Claudette Anderson in the ITV soap opera Emmerdale since 2023. She has a career on stage and screen spanning four decades, appearing in shows such as Coronation Street, In the Club and Sanditon, as well as numerous theatre productions since the 1990s.

== Life and career ==
Flo Wilson was born on 11 February 1963 in Manchester, England. She began working with the Pit Prop Theatre Company in her twenties and made her stage debut in 1991, in a production of Angel. She made further stage appearances in A Fine Example (1993) and A Streetcar Named Desire (1994). In 1995, Wilson made her television debut playing a woman in the crime drama Out of the Blue and subsequently went on to appear roles in shows such as Cardiac Arrest, King Girl and Coronation Street. In 2000, she appeared in That Peter Kay Thing and had a recurring role in the first series of the ITV sitcom Fat Friends. as well as appearing on stage in productions such as Fences (2000) and Black Love (2001). Wilson took a career break from 2001 to mid 2007, returning to the stage in Lisa's Sex Strike (2007) followed by Somebody's Son and Everybody Loves a Winner (2009). In 2010, she appeared in Waterloo Road and DCI Banks. The following year, she had roles in Hollyoaks, Scott & Bailey, Sirens and The Body Farm. In 2012, Wilson appeared in episodes of Eternal Law The Syndicate Leaving, Hebburn and Monroe. In 2013, she made appearances in Moving On, The Mill and All at Sea. In 2014, she appeared in an episode of Vera and played a midwife in From There to Here.

Between 2014 and 2016, she appeared in the BBC One drama In the Club as a senior nurse. In 2018, she appeared in Oliver Twist at the Hull Truck Theatre. In 2021, she appeared in an episode of Death in Paradise. Between 2022 and 2023, Wilson appeared in the historical drama television series Sanditon. In April 2023, Wilson was announced to be joining the cast of the ITV soap opera Emmerdale as Claudette Anderson. Her character was introduced as the mother of established character Charles Anderson (Kevin Mathurin) and prior to her arrival, she was described as "force to be reckoned with".

== Filmography ==
=== Film ===
Year	Title	Role	Notes
2015	Brief Encounters at Bradford Interchange	Anj	Film
2019	Birthday Girl	Jackie	Short film
2021	Help	Velma	Film
2021	The Knock	Audrey	Short film
2023	Jellyfish and Lobster	Grace	Short film

=== Television ===
Year	Title	Role	Notes
1995	Out of the Blue	Woman	Episode: "Death Friday"
1996	Cardiac Arrest	On-Call Administrator	Episode: "The Red Queen"
1996	King Girl	Mrs. Jeffreys	Television film
1998, 2008–2010, 2014	Coronation Street	Kerry Matthews / Nurse / Midwife	Various roles
1999	The Last Train	Midwife	Recurring role
2000	That Peter Kay Thing	Customer	Episode: "That Ice Cream Man Cometh"
2000	Fat Friends	Anita	Recurring role
2001	A Touch of Frost	Nursing Sister	Episode: "Benefit of the Doubt: Part 2"
2001	Bob & Rose	Laura Thane	1 episode
2007, 2012	Emmerdale	Nurse Bradshaw	Guest role
2008	Survivors	Helen Crawley	1 episode
2009	Shameless	Maria	Episode: "Haunted by the Past"
2010	Waterloo Road	Receptionist	1 episode
2010	DCI Banks	Nurse	Episode: "Aftermath: Part 1"
2011	Hollyoaks	Nurse Jennings	Guest role
2011	Scott & Bailey	Obstretician	Episode: "Personal"
2011	Sirens	Neighbour	Episode: "Up, Horny, Down"
2011	The Body Farm	Nurse	1 episode
2012	Eternal Law	Magistrate	1 episode
2012	The Syndicate	Nurse	1 episode
2012	Leaving	Head of Housekeeping	1 episode
2012	Hebburn	Doctor Abineri	1 episode
2012	Monroe	Michelle Gainsford	1 episode
2013	Moving On	Ward Sister	Episode: "Blood Ties"
2013	The Mill	Mary Prince	1 episode
2013	All at Sea	Mrs. Grainger	Episode: "Gymnast"
2014	Vera	Social Worker	Episode: "The Deer Hunters"
2014	From There to Here	Midwife	1 episode
2015	From Darkness	Dr. Lawson	1 episode
2015	After Hours	Jill	Recurring role
2014–2016	In the Club	Senior Nurse	Recurring role
2017	In the Dark	Magistrate	1 episode
2017	Overshadowed	Sarah	1 episode
2021	Death in Paradise	Lulu Deloitte	Episode: "Chain Reaction"
2022	Mood	Melrose	Main role
2023	Lagging	Dorothy	Episode: "Sidequests"
2022–2023	Sanditon	Mrs. Wheatley	Main role
2023	Brassic	Lavender Iyes	Episode: "Sweet Sixteen"
2023–present	Emmerdale	Claudette Anderson	Regular role

=== Radio ===
Year	Title	Role	Network
1998	Shells on a Woven Chord	Hodan/Ong Bad	BBC
1998	Daily Service Singers	Soloist	BBC
1999	Listen to Your Parents	Mother	BBC
2014	Dad	Tracy	BBC
2015	Revelations	Tracy	BBC

== Stage ==
- Angel (1991)
- A Fine Example (1993)
- A Streetcar Named Desire (1994, 2010)
- Frogs (1997) National Theatre
- Bretevski Street (1997)
- Joshua's Egg (1998)
- Fences (2000)
- Black Love (2001)
- Lisa's Sex Strike (2007) Octagon Theatre, Bolton and tour
- Somebody's Son (2009)
- Everybody Loves a Winner (2009) Royal Exchange Theatre, Manchester
- Love on the Dole (2010)
- After Shock (2011)
- Bag Lady (2013–2014)
- To Kill a Mockingbird (2016) Octagon Theatre, Bolton
- Building the Wall (2017) Theater Drachengasse, Vienna - European Premiere
- The Secret Garden (2017)
- Talking Heads (2018)
- One Hand Tied Behind You (2018) Old Vic
- Oliver Twist (2018) Hull Truck Theatre
- Airplays (2018)
- The Tempest (2019) Shakespeare's Rose Theatre, York
- Henry V (2019) Shakespeare's Rose Theatre, York
- The Visit (2020) National Theatre
- Small Island (2022) National Theatre
- Of All the Beautiful Things in the World (2023) HOME, Manchester
- That Can't Have Happened (2025) The King's Arms, Manchester
- Otherhood (VO) (2025) Bradford Arts Centre and tour
