= Ben Addis =

Welsh actor

- Born: Blaenavon, Wales
- Occupation: Actor
- Known for: Hollyoaks, Emmerdale

Ben Addis is a Welsh actor known for his work in theatre and television.

== Early life and education ==
Addis was born in Blaenavon. He was part of Gwent Young People's Theatre (GYPT) in Abergavenny and The National Youth Theatre of Wales. He trained at Bristol Old Vic Theatre School.

== Career ==
Theatre credits include: Rock and Roll (Duke of York's Theatre), King Lear (RSC), Never So Good (National Theatre), Antigone and Widower's Houses (Manchester Royal Exchange), Cinderella (Warwick Arts Centre / Lyric Hammersmith) and Eurydice (ATC/Plymouth Drum/Young Vic).

Film and TV credits include: Lewis (ITV) and Martin Scorsese's Hugo.

In February 2020, Addis played the role of Dr. Parker in Channel 4 soap Hollyoaks.

In August 2023, Addis joined the cast of ITV1 soap Emmerdale as Craig Reed, in which his character raped Lydia Dingle.

== Filmography ==
=== Film ===
Year	Title	Role	Notes
2011	The Decoy Bride	Journalist 1	
2011	Hugo	Salvador Dalí	
2022	Mrs. Harris Goes to Paris	Newspaper Seller	

=== Television ===
Year	Title	Role	Notes
2008	Great Performances	King of France	Episode: "King Lear"
2008	Consuming Passion: 100 Years of Mills & Boon	Frederick	Television film
2010	Lewis	Junior Porter	Episode: "Dark Matter"
2010	At Home with the Georgians	Dudley Ryder	Episode: "A Man's Place"
2012	Dark Matters: Twisted But True	Various roles	5 episodes
2012	Doctor Who	Bob Chilcott	Episode: "The Snowmen"
2013	Murder on the Victorian Railway	Frederick Wicks	Television film
2013	Vera	David Gilloway	Episode: "Young Gods"
2014	The Mysterious Mr Webster	John Webster	Television film
2015	The Eichmann Show	Ron Huntsman	Television film
2015	The Musketeers	Town House Servant	Episode: "The Prodigal Father"
2017	Judge Rinder's Crown Court	Dr. Leo Terrell	2 episodes
2019	The Killer Beside Me	Robert Henry	Episode: "Deadly Business"
2019–2021	Hollyoaks	Doctor Parker	3 episodes
2021	Ted's Top Ten	Alan Rodman	4 episodes
2021	The Girl Before	Peter Creed	3 episodes
2023	Maryland	DT Ian Quayle	
2023	Emmerdale	Craig Reed	Recurring role
