= Martelle Edinborough =

British actress

- Occupation: Actress
- Years active: 2016–
- Television: Emmerdale

Martelle Edinborough is a British actress. After taking acting classes, Edinborough had three guest roles in the soap opera Coronation Street and made other guest appearances in Emmerdale, Hollyoaks, Cold Feet and Doctors, in addition to the short film The Tooth Fairy (2020). After appearing in the horror film Evie, Edinborough returned to Emmerdale as regular character Suzy Merton in 2022, remaining until the character was killed off in 2025. For her role as Suzy, Edinborough was longlisted for "Best Newcomer" at the 2022 Inside Soap Awards.

== Life and career ==
After studying at university, Martelle Edinborough set up her own business and then began taking acting classes but did not intend to go into it professionally. In 2016, Edinborough was part of the theatre company Chicken Shop Shakespeare where they did "flashmob Shakespeare performances" at Bradford City Park.

In 2018, Edinborough appeared in the soap opera Coronation Street as a court clerk for four episodes. The actress called it a "funny twist of fate" that her first role on the soap was of a court clerk due to her background in law. She returned to the soap the following year playing a different character, talent scout Jasmine Ridgeway. She returned to the soap again in 2021, this time playing a police family liaison officer for four episodes. Edinborough also played mental health worker Doctor Keely on another soap opera, Hollyoaks, in April 2019. In 2019, she played Amina Sewak in an episode of the series Cold Feet. The following year, she played Francesca in the short film The Tooth Fairy. She has also appeared in the soap opera Doctors and the documentary series Our Lives. She made an appearance in the horror film Evie (2023).

On 29 March 2022, it was announced that Edinborough had been cast as regular character Suzy Merton another soap opera Emmerdale, with her first appearance airing the following day. Edinborough was cast by Faye Styring, the soap's casting director. Speaking about joining the soap, Edinborough explained, "My feet haven't quite touched the ground yet, I'm still on this massive cloud high up in the sky, but it's been going really, really good. It's just like a family, and it sounds so cliché but it really is and everyone is so lovely and welcoming and helps you settle in really nicely." Edinborough has said that she likes playing seeing Suzy as she sometimes sees herself in the character and noted that they both are confident and risk takers. Edinborough also called reading the scripts for Suzy's character "one excitement after another".

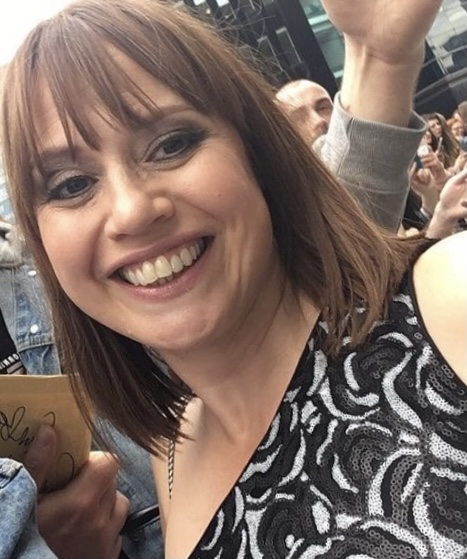
Edinborough went to the same school as her Emmerdale colleague Karen Blick (pictured) and they later took acting classes together

Edinborough found it "perfect" working in Emmerdale due to it being close to Leeds, where she lives. She had previously appeared in Emmerdale as a doctor in 2018. Edinborough had previously worked twice with her Emmerdale co-star Dominic Brunt, who plays Paddy Kirk; once in 2017 in a stage production, where she played a teacher, and the second in 2021 as he had directed Evie. She had also gone to the same school as Karen Blick (Lydia Hart); however, they did not know each other then and they later met when they took acting classes. For her role as Suzy, Edinborough was longlisted for "Best Newcomer" at the 2022 Inside Soap Awards. Edinborough was also part of a special photoshoot for the soap's 50th anniversary, which included the eight of the newest actors to join the Emmerdale cast.

Edinborough later exited the soap when her character was killed off in a limousine crash in February 2025. The scenes were filmed in December 2024 during the night. After the scenes aired, Edinborough confirmed her departure and said that she felt "overwhelmed" at the amount of messages she had received from fans. It was reported that viewers were saddened by the actress' departure from the soap. The actress explained that her Emmerdale departure was a mutual decision, explaining to a viewer on Twitter, "It was mutual in the sense that I had already decided I wanted to achieve more than what was on offer and [Emmerdale bosses] too had to make that call. She called it a "blessing" to have been part of "such an iconic show that I grew up on" and called playing Suzy an "absolute pleasure" that she would always be grateful for. The actress briefly reappeared as Suzy in flashbacks that aired in March 2025. Edinborough's colleague Michelle Hardwick, Roxy Shahidi and Ash Palmisciano all paid tribute to Edinborough on social media, with Hardwick joking, "I'm going to miss hearing you arrive on set saying you've lost something... Every. Single. Day." Hardwick told reporters that she felt sad during Edinborough's last days of filming.

Following her departure, the gambling company Betway gave 4/1 odds of Edinborough joining the cast of soap opera EastEnders due to it being the only British soap opera she had not appeared in, whereas the Head of Brand Marketing at Slingo believed that the actress could join EastEnders as a "logical first step", although he also said that she could pursue a career in drama or film and added, "No matter where she goes next, her time in Emmerdale has paved the way for exciting opportunities, and fans will be eager to follow her journey".

== Filmography ==
Year	Title	Role	Notes	Ref.
Unknown	Our Lives	—N/a	—N/a	
2018	Coronation Street	Court clerk	Guest role (4 episodes)	
2018	Emmerdale	Doctor	Guest role	
2019	Cold Feet	Amina Sewak	Guest role (1 episode)	
2019	Coronation Street	Jasmine Ridgeway	Guest role (1 episode)	
2019	Doctors	Meg Matthews	Guest role (1 episode)	
2019	Hollyoaks	Doctor Keely	Guest role (2 episodes)	
2018	The Tooth Fairy	Francesca	Short film	
2022–25	Emmerdale	Suzy Merton	Regular role	
2023	Evie	Selma	Horror film	
