= Alfie Clarke (actor) =

English actor (born 2007)

- Born: 18 November 2007 (age 18); Leeds, West Yorkshire, England
- Occupation: Actor
- Years active: 2009–present
- Employer: ITV Studios

Alfie Clarke (born 18 November 2007) is an English teen actor, who has appeared as Arthur Thomas in Emmerdale since 22 October 2009.

== Early and personal life ==
Clarke was born in Leeds, West Yorkshire, but lives in Huddersfield, West Yorkshire with his mum Fiona, dad Paul and his younger brother and sister. Clarke attends the Rebel Theatre School in Huddersfield. In May 2017, Clarke raised over £5,000 for the Alzheimer's Society by swimming 46 lengths, both over his target, during a dementia storyline in Emmerdale involving Clarke's on-screen father Ashley Thomas, played by John Middleton.

== Awards and nominations ==
Year	Award	Category	Work	Result	Ref.
2017	Inside Soap Awards	Best Young Actor	Emmerdale	Won	
2017	Yorkshire Young Achievers	Achievement in the Arts	Emmerdale	Won	
2018	Yorkshire Choice Awards	Young Achiever of the Year	Emmerdale	Won	
