= Jonathan Wrather =

English actor

Jonathan Paul Wrather
- Born: 16 March 1969 (age 57); Manchester, England
- Education: Sedbergh School; National Youth Theatre; RADA
- Occupation: Actor
- Years active: 1993–present
- Television: Coronation Street (2002–2003); Emmerdale (2016–2017, 2020)

Jonathan Wrather (born 16 March 1969) is an English actor. He is known for his soap opera roles in Coronation Street as Joe Carter from 2002 until 2003, and in Emmerdale as Pierce Harris from 2016 until 2017, making a guest appearance in 2020.

== Career ==
Wrather has made guest appearances in several television series, including Cracker, Clocking Off, Bob And Rose, Fat Friends, The Fugitives, Bones, Waterloo Road, Silent Witness, Jo, and Casualty. From 2002 to 2003, he was a series regular in the ITV soap opera Coronation Street, portraying the role of Joe Carter for 107 episodes. In 2016, it was confirmed that Wrather would portray the role of Pierce Harris in the ITV soap opera Emmerdale. His character was introduced as the husband of Tess Harris (Nicola Stephenson). Wrather reprised his role as Pierce in January 2020.

== Filmography ==
Selected filmography
Year	Title	Role	Notes
2009	Bones	Emerson	Guest appearance
2016–2017, 2020	Emmerdale	Pierce Harris	Series regular
1999	Casualty	Mr Scott	Guest appearances
2009	Casualty	DS Bond	Guest appearances
2015	Casualty	Alex Harries	Guest appearances
2002–2003	Coronation Street	Joe Carter	Series regular; 107 episodes
Note: This is only three selected works on this filmography. Feel free to expand the article's filmography.
