= Jane Gurnett =

English actress

- Born: Jane E. Gurnett; 12 March 1957 (age 69); Dorset, England
- Occupation: Actress
- Children: 1

Jane E. Gurnett (born 12 March 1957, in Dorset) is an English actress known for her roles in British TV series Casualty (1994–1996), Dangerfield (1998–1999) and the second incarnation of Crossroads (2001–2003). She moved to Warwick School to teach drama. In early 2018, she became part-time to set up an organisation designed to help teachers and parents work with children who have autism.

== Selected credits ==
- The Rainbow (1988) as Anna Brangwen
- Drowning By Numbers (1988) as Nancy
- Casualty (1994–1996) as Rachel Longworth
- Dangerfield (1998–1999) as DI Gillian Kramer
- Real Women (1998–1999) as Chris
- Crossroads (2001–2003) as Kate Russell
- Doctors (2022) as Verity Foster
- Emmerdale (2023) as Faye Helders
