= Mark Charnock =

English actor (b. 1968)

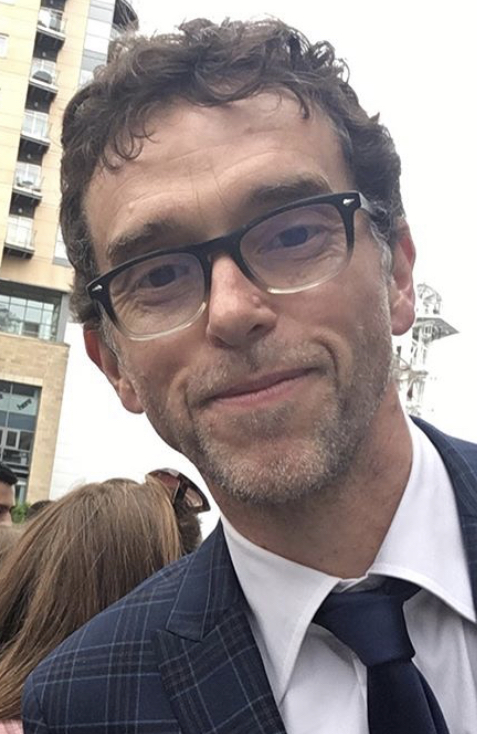
- Charnock in 2019
- Born: 28 August 1968 (age 58); Bolton, Lancashire, England
- Occupation: Actor
- Years active: 1992–present
- Known for: Role of Marlon Dingle in Emmerdale

Mark Charnock (born 28 August 1968) is an English actor. He is best known for his role in ITV's Emmerdale as Marlon Dingle, a role he has played since 1996. Charnock and Emmerdale co-star Dominic Brunt, who plays Paddy Kirk, produce a yearly Zombie Film Festival in the Leeds Cottage Road Cinema.

== Early life ==
Charnock was born on 28 August 1968, and was educated at Canon Slade School, Hull University and Webber Douglas Academy of Dramatic Art. With fellow Emmerdale co-star Dominic Brunt, he hosted Leeds' first ever zombie festival on 20 April 2008.

== Career ==
Charnock's television debut was in 1992, when he played the character of Duane in an episode of 2point4 Children. In 1993, he appeared as a solicitor in the ITV comedy Watching, and later starred alongside Derek Jacobi in Cadfael (1994–1997). In 1993 and 1995, Charnock appeared in two episodes of the ITV soap opera Coronation Street. In 1996, he got the part of Marlon Dingle in Emmerdale. In 2004 and 2022, he won the award for Best Male Dramatic Performance at The British Soap Awards. Then in 2023, he was awarded the British Soap Award for Outstanding Achievement.

== Filmography ==
Year	Title	Role	Notes
1992	2point4 Children	Duane	Episode: "One Night in Bangkok"
1992	Waiting for God	Santa	Episode: "Christmas at Bayview"
1993	Watching	Assessor	Episode: "Wandering One"
1993, 1995	Coronation Street	Delivery Boy / P.C. Turner	2 episodes
1994	EastEnders	P.C. Costigan	1 episode
1994–1997	Cadfael	Brother Oswin	Main role
1996–Present	Emmerdale	Marlon Dingle	Series regular
1997	The Dingles Down Under	Marlon Dingle	Special
1998	Emmerdale: Revenge	Marlon Dingle	Special
1999	Emmerdale: Don't Look Now! - The Dingles in Venice	Marlon Dingle	Special
2010	Emmerdale: The Dingles - For Richer for Poorer	Marlon Dingle	Special
2011	Emmerdale: Paddy and Marlon's Big Night In	Marlon Dingle	Special
2013	Before Dawn	Zombie	Film

== Awards and nominations ==
Year	Award	Category	Result	Ref.
2003	British Soap Awards	Best Actor	Nominated	
2003	British Soap Awards	Best Comedy Performance	Nominated	
2003	British Soap Awards	Best On-Screen Partnership (shared with Sheree Murphy)	Nominated	
2003	9th National Television Awards	Most Popular Actor	Nominated	
2004	British Soap Awards	Best Actor	Nominated	
2004	British Soap Awards	Best Dramatic Performance	Won	
2005	British Soap Awards	Best Actor	Nominated	
2005	Inside Soap Awards	Best Couple (shared with Verity Rushworth)	Nominated	
2006	British Soap Awards	Best Actor	Nominated	
2007	Inside Soap Awards	Best Actor	Nominated	
2008	Digital Spy Soap Awards	Most Popular Actor	Nominated	
2008	Digital Spy Soap Awards	Best On-Screen Partnership (shared with Rushworth)	Nominated	
2008	14th National Television Awards	Serial Drama Performance	Nominated	
2009	British Soap Awards	Best Actor	Nominated	
2009	British Soap Awards	Best On-Screen Partnership (shared with Dominic Brunt)	Nominated	
2010	Inside Soap Awards	Funniest Performance	Nominated	
2011	British Soap Awards	Best Actor	Nominated	
2011	TV Choice Awards	Best Soap Actor	Nominated	
2014	Inside Soap Awards	Best Actor	Nominated	
2015	TV Choice Awards	Best Soap Actor	Nominated	
2016	Inside Soap Awards	Funniest Male	Nominated	
2018	Inside Soap Awards	Funniest Male	Shortlisted	
2019	Inside Soap Awards	Best Actor	Nominated	
2020	25th National Television Awards	Serial Drama Performance	Nominated	
2020	TV Choice Awards	Best Soap Actor	Nominated	
2020	Inside Soap Awards	Best Actor	Nominated	
2022	British Soap Awards	Best Leading Performer	Shortlisted	
2022	British Soap Awards	Best Dramatic Performance	Won	
2022	27th National Television Awards	Serial Drama Performance	Won	
2022	Inside Soap Awards	Best Double Act (shared with Brunt)	Shortlisted	
2022	Inside Soap Awards	Best Actor	Won	
2022	Inside Soap Awards	Best Romance (shared with Zoë Henry)	Won	
2022	TV Choice Awards	Best Soap Actor	Won	
2022	I Talk Telly Awards	Best Soap Performance	Nominated	
2022	Digital Spy Reader Awards	Best Soap Actor (Male)	Third	
2023	2023 British Soap Awards	Outstanding Achievement	Won	
