= Dominic Brunt =

English actor (b. 1970)

- Born: Dominic Adam Brunt; 15 April 1970 (age 55); Macclesfield, Cheshire, England
- Occupations: Actor; director; producer
- Years active: 1993–present
- Spouse: Joanne Mitchell (m. 2003)
- Children: 2

Dominic Adam Brunt (born 15 April 1970) is an English actor, director and producer, best known for playing Paddy Kirk in the ITV soap opera Emmerdale. For his role as Paddy, Brunt has been nominated in various categories at the British Soap Awards, Inside Soap Awards and the National Television Awards. As well as acting, Brunt also produces and directs horror films alongside Joanne Mitchell; he also co-hosts an annual zombie film festival with Emmerdale co-star Mark Charnock.

== Early and personal life ==
Brunt was born on 15 April 1970 in Macclesfield, Cheshire. He was educated at Accrington Moorhead Sports College and the Bristol Old Vic Theatre School, where he met his wife Joanne Mitchell. Brunt and Mitchell have two children.

Brunt is a fan of zombie horror films, and with Emmerdale co-star Mark Charnock, the pair conduct an annual zombie film festival in Leeds.

== Career ==
Since 1997, Dominic Brunt has played the role of Paddy Kirk in the ITV soap opera Emmerdale. For this role, Brunt was nominated in the category of Best Actor at the 2011 British Soap Awards, as well as receiving nominations for Best Comedy Performance in 2009, 2010 and 2013. At the 2019 British Soap Awards, Brunt was nominated for three awards. He received a longlist nomination for Best Actor, and shortlist nominations for Best Male Dramatic Performance and Best On-Screen Partnership, the latter with Lucy Pargeter, who plays his on-screen wife Chas Dingle. Brunt directed and starred in a zombie film called Before Dawn which was made in 2012, and directed Bait (2014) and Attack of the Adult Babies (2017) with Laurence R. Harvey and Lucas Briand in a secondary role. Dominic also featured in the British movie Inbred (2011), playing the role of chainsaw-wielding Podge.

== Filmography ==
Year	Title	Role	Notes
1995	The Bill	Shop Assistant	Episode: "Value for Money"
1995	2point4 Children	Petrol Station Attendant	Episode: "Greed"
1995	Crimewatch File	Gary Briant	Episode: "Going Under"
1995	Skin	Martin	Short film
1996	Paul Merton in Galton and Simpson's...	Young Man	Episode: "Twelve Angry Men"
1996	Soldier Soldier	Ron Jarvis	Episode: "Money for Nothing"
1996	Inspector Morse	Detective	Episode: "The Daughters of Cain"
1997	Crimewatch UK	Witness Driver	1 episode
1997–present	Emmerdale	Paddy Kirk	Series regular
1997	Holding On	Policeman	1 episode
1999	Emmerdale: Don't Look Now! - The Dingles in Venice	Paddy Kirk	Special
2008	28	The Butcher	Film
2011	Inbred	Podge	Film
2013	Shortcuts to Hell: Volume 1	Dr. Jackson	Film
2013	Ghost Burger	Benedict Tooley	Short film
2015	The Box	Harold	Film
2017	Attack of the Adult Babies	Sterculius Voice	Film; also director
2017	Funny Cow	Landlord	Film
2020	Sky Sharks	Ice Cream Guy	Film
2022	Wolf Manor		Film; director

== Awards and nominations ==
Year	Award	Category	Result	Ref.
1999	British Soap Awards	Best On-Screen Partnership (with Lisa Riley)	Nominated	
2009	British Soap Awards	Best Comedy Performance	Nominated	
2009	British Soap Awards	Best On-Screen Partnership (with Mark Charnock)	Nominated	
2010	British Soap Awards	Best Comedy Performance	Nominated	
2010	Inside Soap Awards	Best Actor	Nominated	
2010	Inside Soap Awards	Funniest Performance	Nominated	
2011	British Soap Awards	Best Actor	Longlisted	
2013	British Soap Awards	Best Comedy Performance	Nominated	
2017	British Soap Awards	Best Comedy Performance	Nominated	
2018	23rd National Television Awards	Serial Drama Performance	Longlisted	
2019	24th National Television Awards	Serial Drama Performance	Longlisted	
2019	British Soap Awards	Best Actor	Longlisted	
2019	British Soap Awards	Best Male Dramatic Performance	Nominated	
2019	British Soap Awards	Best On-Screen Partnership (with Lucy Pargeter)	Nominated	
2019	Inside Soap Awards	Funniest Male	Nominated	
2019	Inside Soap Awards	Best Partnership (with Lucy Pargeter)	Won	
2020	Inside Soap Awards	Best Actor	Longlisted	
2020	Inside Soap Awards	Best Partnership (with Lucy Pargeter)	Nominated	
2023	British Soap Awards	Best Leading Performer	Nominated	
2023	TVTimes Awards	Favourite Soap Actor	Pending	
