= Gavin Blyth =

TV Producer and journalist

- Born: Gavin John Blyth; 27 October 1969; Southport, Lancashire, England
- Died: 26 November 2010 (aged 41); Leeds, West Yorkshire, England
- Occupations: Television producer, journalist
- Years active: 2002–2010
- Television: Emmerdale; Coronation Street
- Spouse(s): Charlotte (divorced); Suzy Blyth (until 2010)
- Children: 3; including Tom Blyth

Gavin John Blyth (27 October 1969 – 26 November 2010) was a British television producer and journalist. He was well known for being series producer of Emmerdale from January 2009 until his death. Beginning his career in 2002, he joined Emmerdale in 2003 as a writer. He later went on to be an assistant producer and also a story editor on Coronation Street.

== Early life ==
Blyth was born on 27 October 1969 in Southport; he grew up in the village of Hesketh Bank, and was educated at Tarleton High School. He was the son of Merseyside journalist and broadcaster Roger Blyth. Gavin began his journalism career in 1985 with his father's company, Mercury Press Agency in Liverpool.

=== Emmerdale ===
On 17 January 2009, it was announced that Anita Turner had quit her role as Emmerdale's series producer after one year. Blyth was later announced as producer on 22 January 2009. His first credited episode was broadcast on 13 March 2009.

He introduced a number of characters to the show, including Faye Lamb (Kim Thomson), Lizzie Lakely (Kitty McGeever), Ryan Lamb (James Sutton), Jai Sharma (Chris Bisson), Nikhil Sharma (Rik Makarem), Priya Sharma (Fiona Wade), Sally Spode (Siân Reeves), Jackson Walsh (Marc Silcock), Hazel Rhodes (Pauline Quirke), Alicia Gallagher (Natalie Anderson) and Cameron Murray (Dominic Power). Blyth also reintroduced past and popular characters to the programme including Charity Tate (Emma Atkins) and Kelly Windsor (Adele Silva). Emmerdale's Danny Miller, who portrays Aaron Livesy, held a football match for Blyth with co-stars and stars from Coronation Street. They raised £66,000 for Macmillan Cancer Support.

== Personal life ==
Blyth was married to Suzy Dee Blyth, with whom he had a son. He had two older children, Tom and a daughter, from his first marriage to Charlotte.

He has an older sister called Alison who is the senior publicist of Coronation Street.

== Awards ==
In May 2011, Blyth was awarded the Special Achievement Award at the British Soap Awards. It was accepted by his partner Suzy.

== Death ==
Blyth died from a form of lymphoma cancer at St James' Hospital in Leeds, weeks after it had been diagnosed.
