= Priya Sharma =

Fictional character from Emmerdale

- Emmerdale character
- Fiona Wade as Priya Sharma (2011)
- Portrayed by: Effie Woods (2009–2010); Fiona Wade (2011–2023)
- Duration: 2009–2023
- First appearance: 14 September 2009
- Last appearance: 27 January 2023
- Introduced by: Gavin Blyth (2009); Stuart Blackburn (2011)
In-universe information
- Occupation: Personal assistant; Bartender; Business manager; Wedding planner
- Father: Rishi Sharma
- Mother: Georgia Sharma
- Brothers: Nikhil Sharma
- Half-brothers: Jai Sharma
- Husband: Rakesh Kotecha (2016–2020)
- Daughters: Amba Metcalfe
- Stepsons: Kirin Kotecha
- Nephews: Archie Breckle
- Nieces: Mia Macey; Molly Sharma; Eliza Sharma

Priya Kotecha (also Sharma) is a fictional character from the British television soap opera Emmerdale, played by Fiona Wade. The character was introduced along with her brothers Jai (Chris Bisson) and Nikhil (Rik Makarem) by series producer, Gavin Blyth, as part of an ongoing overhaul of the show. Blyth described the characters as young, contemporary and living independent of their parents. Priya was originally played by Effie Woods from her introduction on 14 September 2009 until 1 March 2010. Wade took over the role in 2011.

Before her arrival on-screen, Woods described Priya as being fun-loving. She called her a flirtatious party girl and said she can be manipulative. She tends to charm her way out of any situation. Priya is closer to her elder brother Jai and often clashes with Nikhil. After the character was recast, Wade stated that Priya is confident and lives her life how she wants. Priya's storylines have seen her embark on a casual fling with Cain Dingle (Jeff Hordley) and start a relationship with David Metcalfe (Matthew Wolfenden), her feud with Alicia Gallagher (Natalie Anderson), a battle with anorexia, a marriage to Rakesh Kotecha (Pasha Bocarie), and an affair with Pete Barton (Anthony Quinlan), the fiancé of her best friend Leyla Harding (Roxy Shahidi). In October 2022, it was announced that Wade was set to leave Emmerdale after 11 years and her final scenes aired on 27 January 2023.

== Casting ==
On 21 July 2009, Kris Green from Digital Spy reported Emmerdale's new series producer, Gavin Blyth, would be introducing a new family called the Sharmas part of an ongoing overhaul of the show. The family, which consisted of three siblings, arrived in the village to manage a new confectionery factory. Of the siblings, Blyth said "The Sharmas are a young, contemporary family independent of their parents and will bring the factory into the heart of the village community. They will add real vitality to life in Emmerdale." Chris Bisson was cast as eldest sibling Jai Sharma, and Rik Makarem was cast as Nikhil Sharma. Effie Woods received the role of their younger sister, Priya. Woods was working in a call centre when her agent called to tell her she had won the part. Woods commented "I just ran down the corridor screaming – it was so amazing! It's a big show with such a history and such weight to it."

In September 2011, it was announced Priya would be returning to Emmerdale, with Wade taking over the role from Woods. The actress told a writer from What's on TV, "I feel very happy and excited about this new venture and I'm delighted to be joining Emmerdale." On 6 May 2012, it was revealed that Wade had signed a new contract keeping her with the show for another year. She told Susan Hill from the Daily Star, "I've just signed a one-year contract, which I'm absolutely delighted about. It means they can plan lots of things for me, which is very exciting."

== Development ==
=== Characterisation ===
"Priya's always had a head full of ideas and ambitions but unlike her parents or her brothers, rarely has her head screwed on. She can make rash decisions like doing things for effect, but often ends up needing to be bailed out. Despite this, she usually means well and loves her family."

— An ITV.com writer on Priya

Shortly before arrival on-screen, Woods called Priya a "fun-loving and fancy-free" character and said she would give her brothers a few headaches. Priya is a flirtatious, party girl who struggles with authority. Woods revealed the character's backstory, saying "Prior to arriving in the village, she went to fashion college but ended up dropping out, then she tried to set up her own business which could have done well, but she was bad at managing her money and spent it all. She ended up broke and had to get her family to bail her out." The actress believed that despite her tough exterior, Priya was ashamed of her business failing. Woods explained that the role of Priya appealed to her because she is a free spirit. She continued "She's a likeable person, a little bit manipulative but she's very upfront with it and charms her way out of any situation, so people tend to take to her." Priya is closer to Jai as he is relaxed, where as she clashes with Nikhil, who is more work orientated and dislikes her "sponging off them".

Following the recast, Wade called Priya a sexy, pretty and classy girl. She explained "She's very confident and outspoken. Some of the things she comes out with, I think I wish I could say that. And, of course, she does love a bad boy." Priya finds employment at the local pub, The Woolpack, which Wade dubbed "an institution". She was honoured to be given the chance to play the new barmaid, despite being teetotal in real life. She believed Priya would bring something different to the Woolpack and revealed that regulars would not be sure how to take her. The actress teased more drama with between Priya and her brothers and said she was looking forward to it. She added that Priya "lives her life exactly how she wants" and Jai and Nikhil cannot control what she does.

=== Cain Dingle ===
Shortly after her return to the village, Priya embarks on a fling with Cain Dingle (Jeff Hordley). Priya's flirtation with Cain is a chance for her to have some fun and wind up her brothers. When Jai's partner, Charity Tate (Emma Atkins), warns Priya to stay away from Cain, she refuses to listen to her. Wade told Inside Soap's Kate White, "The fact Charity has warned her off has actually made Priya more interested in Cain. She's really intrigued by him, and has no idea that he's just interested in her to antagonise Jai." The actress said that it is all a bit of fun for Priya, but it could all go wrong because of Cain's history. Wade revealed that Priya loves all the game-playing, but she did not think it was long until Cain has her where he wants her. Wade later explained to a writer for What's on TV, "Cain is totally using her, but Priya enjoys spending time with him as he treats her well. So she doesn't really think too much about his motives. She's not aware he's seeing her to annoy Jai. When Cain treats Priya to a night of champagne and a posh hotel she's in her element. They have good chemistry and I think she can sense he's a bad boy – it attracts her."

Cain continues his rivalry with Jai, by using his family to get to him. Priya is unaware of what Cain is capable of, which is why she has been "bowled over" by him. When Jai finds out his sister has been seeing Cain, he is livid. However, she continues seeing Cain and he gives her a necklace. Bisson stated "The necklace belongs to their mum, Georgia, and was recently stolen. Jai's suspicions are aroused when Priya refuses to say where she got it from – but has no idea it's her mother's." Jai accuses Priya of stealing the necklace, which does not go down well. When their father Rishi Sharma (Bhasker Patel) is involved in a car accident, Jai suspects Cain tampered with the car and his suspicions grow when Cain texts him a picture of a sleeping Priya. Even with the evidence that Cain has been hurting her family, Priya refuses to believe that he has done anything wrong. The family become troubled by Priya's refusal to end her romance with Cain. When an argument between Jai and Priya ends in her being accidentally knocked to the ground, Cain encourages her to go to the police. Jai is then arrested and charged with assault.

=== David Metcalfe ===
In May 2012, Wade revealed that the scriptwriters had lined up a new love interest for Priya, but she was unaware of who it would be. She stated "All I've been told is that there will be a love interest coming her way but they won't tell me anything else." In August, Priya takes an interest in David Metcalfe (Matthew Wolfenden) after she is touched by his fatherly bond with Jacob Gallagher (Joe Warren-Plant). Priya and David talk and he reveals that his marriage to Jacob's mother, Alicia Gallagher (Natalie Anderson), is fake. However, when Priya asks David out for a drink, she is disappointed when he turns her down. Wolfenden later confirmed that a romance between Priya and David would begin to develop and they would share "secret snogs in the woods". David and Priya try to be discreet with their relationship, but after they are almost caught by Genesis Walker (Sian Reese-Williams), they decide to arrange "a rendezvous" outside the village. However, they are caught by Nikhil and a show spokesperson explained "Being caught kissing by your brother is cringeworthy at the best of times, but Nikhil doesn't even know what's been going on. As far as he's aware, David is with Alicia – which means David's got a bit of explaining to do before that situation gets out of hand."

David explains the truth about his marriage to Alicia to Nikhil, but he is scared that his friend is going to tell everyone about Priya. Nikhil also talks to his sister about getting involved with other people's husbands and Priya agrees to stay away from David. But when David and Priya run into each other at the local shop, "their chemistry remains as powerful as ever." Priya suggests that she and David continue their relationship in secret and he agrees.

=== Departure ===
On 23 October 2022, Joe Anderton of Digital Spy reported that Wade had decided to leave Emmerdale and would be filming her final scenes in the coming months, as she wanted to seek other acting opportunities. In an interview with Johnathon Hughes of Inside Soap, Wade told him that deciding to leave the serial was one of the hardest decisions she had ever made, but she wanted to challenge herself. She said that filming her last scenes was hard, especially knowing that she was going to leave her "Emmerdale family". Wade also commented that she would miss playing a character as complex, "cool and glamorous" as Priya. Her departure scenes were broadcast on 27 January 2023.

In the lead up to Priya's exit, she organises a successful event at her wedding business Take A Vow, but when some candles set a bridal veil on fire, she suffers flashbacks to being severely burned in a fire two years prior. Wade explained "It's hugely triggering. Priya freezes and has a breakdown, which takes her by surprise as in the past few months, she's felt like her old self again – and this is a major setback. It makes her realise this thing she has gone through hasn't completely disappeared, it's still there." When Priya is offered a job opportunity in London, she is "already feeling out of sorts" and feels that it could be a fresh start. Wade said that there were a lot of memories for Priya in the village and that helps with her decision to accept the job.

Wade was proud of her character for standing up to Leyla, who was offered the same job, and her accusations of sabotage. She pointed out that Priya had been running the business single-handedly for a while, and the way Leyla reacts makes Priya realise that she needs to take this opportunity, as Leyla is taking advantage of her. Wade told Hughes: "I love that Priya feels empowered rather than guilty about deciding to accept the job. As much as I know she will be upset to leave her friends and family, and it will feel daunting knowing she has to stand on her own two feet, she feels strong about this decision." Priya's exit is marred by David's reaction to her news and the subsequent kidnapping of their daughter Amba. Wade noted that David has been going through a tough time and Priya taking Amba away "is another nail in the coffin."

== Storylines ==
Upon arriving in Emmerdale, Priya gets drunk with Eli Dingle (Joseph Gilgun) in The Woolpack. She then ends up dancing on top of Ashley Thomas' (John Middleton) car. She is a bit of a handful and a party girl and does not like taking responsibility. Priya is given a job at the factory run by her brothers Jai and Nikhil, but she quits after they make her acting supervisor. She reveals that she did not like the way it affected her friendships with the other employees, in particular Eli. Priya eventually returns to work, but not as a supervisor. Priya hands in her notice to her surprised siblings, admitting that she is tired of the country life and being bossed about. Priya leaves the village in a taxi, as Jai and Nikhil wave her off.

A year later, Priya returns to the village with her parents, Rishi and Georgia Sharma (Trudie Goodwin), to meet Jai's fiancée, Charity Tate (Emma Atkins). Priya announces that she is staying and moving back in with Jai and Nikhil. Priya flirts with Cain Dingle in The Woolpack and they begin a casual relationship. Jai tries to convince her that Cain is trying to destroy their family in revenge for him being with Charity, but Priya does not believe him. When she discovers that Cain got Amy Wyatt (Chelsea Halfpenny) pregnant, Priya is disgusted and ends the relationship. Priya gets a job working behind the bar of The Woolpack.

Priya develops a crush on David Metcalfe, who initially resists her advances on account of his marriage to Alicia Gallagher (Natalie Anderson), who is serving time in prison. Priya continues to flirt with David, who succumbs to her advances. They arrange to meet up outside the village and Nikhil catches them together. Believing that David's marriage to Alicia is genuine, he is disgusted and tries to get David and Priya to end the relationship. However, Priya persuades David to continue seeing her in secret. Priya is devastated when David ends their relationship, so he can put Jacob first. Priya later agrees to go on a date with Robbie Lawson (Jamie Shelton).

Rishi tells his family that he is the father of Rachel Breckle's (Gemma Oaten) son Archie. Priya, Georgia and Nikhil all disown Rishi, but Jai sticks by him and it soon emerges that Jai is Archie's father. Rishi and Jai offer David another shop to run, which he decides to accept. When Priya finds out, it leads to an argument in the street, which Rachel and Alicia soon get involved in. When Priya insults Rachel and Archie, she slaps her. Priya is about to slap Rachel back but is stopped by David and Alicia. Priya is angry that the pair stopped her so turns around and slaps Alicia. Alicia goes to attack Priya but David stops her, saying if she hits Priya, she will lose her probation. Priya walks into The Woolpack and tells Chas Dingle (Lucy Pargeter) that she is leaving the village, and is shocked when David asks her for his ring back. Priya is fuming and slaps David, but he takes the ring off her and proposes again. When Alicia arrives to tell David that she loves him, Priya answers the door and tells Alicia that she and David are engaged again, devastating Alicia.

Priya is among several residents held hostage by Cameron Murray (Dominic Power) in The Woolpack. She is quick to help when Cameron shoots Alicia in the stomach, and allows David to leave to the pub to get Alicia to hospital. She is later distraught, however, when David leaves Priya on her wedding day for Alicia. Priya is later upset when she learns that she is pregnant with David's child, and plans to have an abortion, although David and Alicia manage to persuade her to keep the baby. Priya begins leaving her food and develops an eating disorder, and manages to keep it a secret. When Alicia's sister, Leyla Harding (Roxy Shahidi) returns to Emmerdale, she becomes good friends with Priya, as they both hate David. Priya then persuades Rishi to give Leyla a job at the factory. Leyla eventually finds out about Priya's eating disorder, and tries to persuade her to get help for her baby's sake. When Priya has an ultrasound scan for her baby, Leyla reveals the eating disorder to the midwife, which infuriates Priya. Jai then finds out about the eating disorder, and when he tries to get through to Priya, she shouts at him and slaps him.

A few weeks later, Priya collapses in the café, hitting her stomach. She is rushed to hospital, where she is told that she and her unborn child are suffering from anorexia, due to her eating disorder. David learns of the eating disorder and is furious, although feels guilty when Georgia explains that stress probably caused it. When Priya returns home, her family, mainly Georgia, try to persuade her to eat different foods. After eating a cooked meal, Priya forces herself to be sick, as she cannot stomach the food. Priya later realises that what she is doing is wrong and goes to a special eating disorder clinic to save herself and her baby. In the same week Priya leaves the clinic, she gives birth seven weeks early to her daughter, with Alicia's help. As the ambulance arrives, the baby stops breathing. The baby survives and Priya decides to name her Amba. Priya then reveals to her family that she would like an arranged marriage, much to Georgia's disgust. Priya is upset by Georgia's reaction, and is furious when Georgia reveals to her first suitor about her anorexia.

Priya begins a relationship with Rakesh Kotecha (Pasha Bocarie) and they announce their engagement. At their wedding, Priya admits that she is not ready to get married and tells Rakesh that she only wanted to marry him to give Amba a father figure. Rakesh decides to leave. However, Priya convinces him to stay, admitting that she wants to give their relationship another chance. When his teenage son Kirin comes to stay, Priya becomes supportive to his relationship with Vanessa Woodfield. When Vanessa becomes pregnant, Rakesh tampers with the DNA results where Adam is revealed as the biological father. Priya finds out the truth, but she stands by him and agrees for Rakesh to wait. When Jai gets sent to hospital due to his cocaine use, Priya decides to take control with the factory. However, she becomes a target of sexism when Rishi phones Nikhil to take care of the business. Furious with her father, she walks out on the business.

Priya breaks up with Rakesh when she finds out that he has committed arson, but she later decides to stay with him. The following year, Rakesh's arson is revealed to the village. A stressed Priya has sex with Pete Barton (Anthony Quinlan), the boyfriend of Leyla, her best friend. She reveals to Rakesh that she has cheated on him, leading to him leaving the village. Priya feels guilty but has sex with Pete two more times, including on the night of Pete and Leyla's wedding, which ends up not happening due to both parties leaving each other at the altar. Leyla finds out about the affair and is furious with both of them.

A stressed Priya, exacerbated by Amba's refusal to eat her food, lashes out at her young niece Eliza Macey in an outburst witnessed by Rishi, causing the toddler much distress. On the following day, at Eliza's second birthday party, Priya attempts to avoid her only to cause her further upset when she is urged by Jai to help her open a present. After Jai finds bruises on Eliza's legs, Rishi considers that Priya may be responsible, much to her outrage. She does, however, become under suspicion of child abuse, when initial investigation of the bruises prove inconclusive and she confesses her prior outburst to Eliza's parents, who refuse to let her see Eliza. However, Priya's innocence is ultimately proved when Eliza's bruises return in the company of her mother a month later and are determined to be the result of medication she is taking for epilepsy. When Leyla returns to the village, she forgives Priya due to her having made similar mistakes.

== Reception ==
Of the character's first appearance, a reporter for the Sunday Mercury stated "Priya Sharma makes a dramatic entrance into the village when she gets drunk and dances on the vicar's car. She's 'working' at the factory but has no compunction about stealing sweets from her brothers." Jane Simon and Brian McIver, writing for the Daily Record thought the Sharmas were the perfect team to run a confectionery business, saying "There's hard-boiled Nikhil, brother Jai – who's as sweet and soft-hearted as a marshmallow Flump – and then there's little sister Priya, who's nutty and doused in liqueur." Simon later commented "Priya and David aren't the first soap couple, and probably won't be the last, to use 'going jogging' as an alibi for secret liaisons and some naughty carrying on." Simon's colleague branded Priya and David "saucy devils" when they agreed to carry on meeting in secret.

In August 2017, Wade was longlisted for Sexiest Female at the Inside Soap Awards. She did not progress to the viewer-voted shortlist. Following Priya's exit in 2023, Laura-Jayne Tyler from Inside Soap wrote "Bye then, Priya. Your exit plot had more going on than a Dingle family jumble sale – but you styled it out to the end. Class Act".
