= Lizzie Lakely =

Fictional character from Emmerdale

- Emmerdale character
- Portrayed by: Kitty McGeever
- Duration: 2009–2013
- First appearance: 28 April 2009
- Last appearance: 28 March 2013
- Introduced by: Gavin Blyth
In-universe information
- Occupation: Cleaner; Call centre worker Factory worker
- First cousins: Lisa Dingle
- Other relatives: Belle Dingle

Lizzie Lakely is a fictional character from the British ITV soap opera Emmerdale, played by Kitty McGeever. Lizzie is Emmerdale's first blind character, and was played by a blind actress. She made her first on-screen appearance on 28 April 2009. Lizzie's last appearance was on 28 March 2013. McGeever had health problems, but, in June 2013, producer Kate Oates stated there had been plans for her to return. McGeever died in August 2015, however, without having returned to the series.

== Creation and casting ==
In January 2009, it was announced that Anita Turner had stepped down from the position of series producer and that Gavin Blyth had taken over the role. With Turner's departure Blyth began the show's rejuvenation and with that came his first signing, actress Kim Thomson as Faye Lamb. On 2 March 2009, it was announced that Emmerdale had signed comedian Kitty McGeever, the first blind actress to be cast in a British soap, as Lizzie Lakely, the cousin of Lisa Dingle (Jane Cox). Speaking of her casting, McGeever said, "I'm thrilled to be joining Emmerdale as Lizzie and delighted that the show is challenging stereotypes in this way. Lizzie spells trouble from the word go and will be causing all kinds of strife in the village." Of the casting, the show's series producer Blyth said, "Kitty is an extremely talented actress and I'm pleased that she will be joining the show, marking the arrival of such a fascinating character. Lizzie is forthright and fun and she'll soon prove that she isn’t afraid to manipulate circumstances to her advantage."

McGeever later revealed in an interview with This Morning that she helped to create her new alter ego Lizzie, of this input she explained, "The character was developed by me with the producers. So I had some input. The producers came to see my standup show and Gavin [Blyth] the producer said: 'We want that woman on stage but toned down', because I'm quite outrageous on stage!" Speaking to BBC Radio 4's Front Row about filling a disabled quota McGeever said, "I’m not representing anyone, I’m Kitty McGeever and I’m just blind."

== Storylines ==
Lizzie is first seen in April 2009, when she meets Laurel Thomas (Charlotte Bellamy) at community service. Laurel takes pity on Lizzie after realising she is blind, and buys her a meal after Lizzie claims to have left her handbag on the bus. Lizzie meets her cousin Lisa Dingle (Jane Cox) in the village shop and, whilst in the shop, puts some items in her bag that she did not intend to pay for but Lisa catches her and asks her to put them back. Consequently, Lizzie takes her purse out too, which she had told Laurel she had lost. When leaving Laurel and Ashley's (John Middleton) house, she is taken away by the police for not obeying her curfew. Lizzie moves in with the Dingles but outstays her welcome, annoying Zak Dingle (Steve Halliwell) and soon makes friends in the village.

Lizzie makes friends with David Metcalfe (Matthew Wolfenden) and begins to support him in the upcoming council election, but when Eric Pollard (Chris Chittell) offers her cash, she supports him instead. She attends a council function for the disabled with him but they are removed by security when she is recognised as a thief and her tag is seen.

Lizzie attends Natasha Wylde (Amanda Donohoe) and Mark Wylde's (Maxwell Caulfield) vow renewal reception, and belittles Marlon Dingle's (Mark Charnock) catering, knowing that he would cook her another meal to change her opinion of his cooking. Lizzie and Marlon become friends and Marlon asks her to move into Tall Trees Cottage with him and she accepts, annoying his brother, Eli (Joseph Gilgun). Eli doesn't trust Lizzie and begins to follow her to find out where she makes her money. He discovers that she is working on a psychic hotline and Marlon later learns that she is the psychic that he had been ringing for romantic advice. He demands that Lizzie return that money and she does. When she wins some money on a scratch card, Eli Dingle and Jake Doland (James Baxter) trick her in order to keep the winnings but Jake feels guilty and owns up, returning the money. In his defence, Eli remarks that Lizzie is also a con-artist and she starts questioning her behaviour. She and Eli gradually become good friends.

Over time, Lizzie makes more friends and gets a job at David's cleaning firm; however, she eventually starts work at the sweet factory owned by Jai (Chris Bisson) and Nikhil Sharma (Rik Makarem) instead. Lizzie is attacked by an angry Aaron Dingle (Danny Miller) sending her handbag into the river and knocking her to the ground; thinking she has been mugged, Lizzie calls the police. Aaron later returns the bag after fishing it out of the river but does not accept the reward she offered him. Lizzie is left traumatised by this and Marlon and Eli become concerned when she refuses to leave the house. Lisa eventually speaks to her and Lizzie tells her that she was once violently mugged and her blindness scares her under all the bravado. Lizzie is intimidated when a desperate Shadrach Dingle (Andy Devine) hassles her for money for alcohol when they are alone.

In 2011, Lizzie is unaware that Derek Benrose (Stephen Bent) had raped her cousin, Lisa. After he raped Lisa, Derek starts flirting with Lizzie and Lizzie is flattered by the attention. When Lisa tries to warn Lizzie that she shouldn't get too close to Derek, Lizzie assumes Lisa is jealous and tells her to back off. Later that week, Nikhil asks someone to do overtime and Derek volunteers himself and Lizzie, making Lisa worry that he might attack Lizzie so she tells people that Derek raped her. He is suspended, pending an investigation, and Lizzie feels guilty for blocking her best friend out when she needed to talk to someone, she apologises to Lisa and they make up and since then Lizzie has taken a distinct dislike to Derek and she, Lisa and everyone else was happy when Derek was sent down for rape.

In December 2011, Lizzie returns after going away for a while and when she goes into the pub, she confronts Marlon, telling him that she had tripped over a handbag that had been left on the floor, she asks who is his new woman, but Moira Barton (Natalie J. Robb) steps in and tells her that it is her handbag, Lizzie is confused and asks why Moira's bag is in the house, not knowing that Moira's husband John Barton (James Thornton) has thrown her out for cheating on him with Cain Dingle (Jeff Hordley), so Marlon brushes it off. Later on, Ashley storms around Marlon's house looking for Laurel, but Marlon is left puzzled, he hears someone upstairs and rushes up there, he storms in the bathroom and catches Lizzie in the shower, later on Lizzie is confused to why Ashley was looking for Laurel and finds out that Marlon and Laurel fell in love while she was away but did not have an affair, this stuns Lizzie and she is left speechless. Lizzie later feels left out when Marlon announces that he is moving Laurel, Sandy (Freddie Jones), Gabby (Annelise Manojlovic) and Arthur Thomas (Alfie Clarke) into Tall Trees Cottage, she tells Lisa that she would feel pushed out, Laurel overhears and tells Lizzie she won't be pushed out of the cottage. However, Lizzie leaves the village without an explanation.

== Reception ==
Disabled charity Leonard Cheshire Disability praised the decision to sign the first blind actress to be cast in a UK soap, John Knight the charity's assistant director of policy and campaigns, said of the move, "We applaud the decision by Emmerdale to champion the country's first ever blind soap actress. It is a breath of fresh air in an area where disabled actors and actresses are totally underrepresented."

In April 2010, Disability Now, a magazine aimed at disabled people criticised Lizzie along with fellow disabled characters in UK soap operas such as, Adam Best (David Proud) of EastEnders, Hayley Ramsey (Kelly-Marie Stewart) of Hollyoaks and Izzy Armstrong (Cherylee Houston) of Coronation Street for all being portrayed as 'vengeful' and 'personality-driven' stating that soap operas need to portray some disabled character's as 'normal' good people.
