= Eli Dingle =

Fictional character from Emmerdale

- Emmerdale character
- Portrayed by: Joe Gilgun
- Duration: 2006–2010
- First appearance: 13 July 2006
- Last appearance: 30 April 2010
- Introduced by: Kathleen Beedles
In-universe information
- Father: Albert Dingle
- Mother: Delilah Dingle
- Brothers: Marlon Dingle
- Grandfathers: Jedediah Dingle
- Grandmothers: Peg Dingle
- Uncles: Zak Dingle; Shadrach Dingle; Caleb Dingle; Ezra Dingle
- First cousins: Ben Dingle; Butch Dingle; Sam Dingle; Cain Dingle; Belle Dingle; Chas Dingle; Mandy Dingle; Del Dingle
- Other relatives: Charity Dingle; Debbie Dingle; Aaron Dingle; Luke Dingle; Matthew Dingle; Mark Dingle; Solomon Dingle

Eli Dingle is a fictional character from the British ITV soap opera Emmerdale, played by Joe Gilgun. He first appeared on screen in the episode which aired on 13 July 2006 and made his last appearance on 30 April 2010. He is the younger brother of Marlon Dingle (Mark Charnock).

== Storylines ==
Eli was a penniless drifter, just released from prison, now working as a builder turned up unannounced on his uncle Zak Dingle's (Steve Halliwell) doorstep and was told he was unwelcome. No one was pleased to see Eli, not even his older brother Marlon Dingle (Mark Charnock). It was soon clear Eli had got them into plenty of mischief in the past. Eli then witnessed the terrifying King's River showhome collapse which killed several villagers. Eli helped in the rescue and later defended his cousin Sam Dingle (James Hooton) and his terminally ill wife Alice (Ursula Holden-Gill) against Cain Dingle (Jeff Hordley). Zak agreed to let Eli stay, but he soon got into trouble when Marlon emotionally blackmailed him into obtaining the morphine Sam used in Alice's assisted suicide. Eli was disowned when Zak found out he had provided the morphine. He returned when Sam found him living rough in the woods on the run from some vicious drug dealers. After the men attacked Marlon trying to discover his whereabouts, Eli came up with a plan to frame them for armed robbery at the post office. His scheme worked and Zak accepted Eli back into the family.

Eli had several negative encounters with the law and the other villagers, including being wrongly arrested for Tom King's (Ken Farrington) murder after unknowingly stealing the murder weapon from Home Farm. There was some flirtation with Kelly Windsor (Adele Silva) and after aborting Jimmy King's (Nick Miles) baby, Kelly ended up drunkenly kissing Eli. This was caught on film by Debbie Dingle (Charley Webb) who used it to blackmail Kelly. After Jimmy dumped Kelly at the altar, Eli helped her leave town by stealing Debbie's car. Eli later began an on/off relationship with his cousin Debbie after agreeing to help her with some money-making schemes, including pretending to be Scott Windsor (Ben Freeman) in order for her to obtain a loan to buy his garage business.

When a local bookmaker refused to pay out, Marlon decided to rob the bookies in revenge. Eli initially tried to talk him out of it, but eventually helped plan the robbery. Marlon was shocked to discover Eli had brought a gun and he pulled out of the plan. Worried, Marlon later intervened to stop Eli, but the gun went off accidentally and Marlon was shot in the chest. Marlon recovered, but was angry with Eli. When a story about him being a hero appeared, Marlon was rewarded for his supposed bravery with enough money to buy himself and Donna a house, Eli was jealous and began to blackmail his brother. Zak eventually found out what was going on and physically attacked Eli, calling him a "snivelling little traitor".

Instead of leaving town, Eli lay in wait and kidnapped his brother, driving him to the top of a multi-storey car park. When a terrified Marlon questioned why Eli was doing this, Eli admitted that it was because he had always resented Marlon. That he had spent his whole life being "the rubbish one" nobody loved, whilst everyone loved Marlon. During the argument, Marlon managed to get free and the two brothers had a fight that ended with Eli hanging from the side of the building. Marlon begged him to give him his hand, but Eli refused and when he was rescued anyway, he cried that he had not wanted to be saved and ran back to Zak, who furiously told Eli he was disowned.

Eli discovered that pensioner Lily Butterfield (Anne Charleston) was using her polytunnel to grow cannabis to help with her arthritis. He began to blackmail her so that he could sell some of the cannabis for money. This led to Sam becoming unwittingly involved and arrested. Sam confessed and Eli was then arrested and named Lily. Luckily, Zak and Edna destroyed the evidence, and so the police were forced to drop the charges. Zak was disgusted with Eli and once again temporarily disowned him.

Despite knowing that Debbie didn't love him, Eli planned a picnic in order to propose to her. He said he wanted to help her to get custody of her daughter Sarah. Debbie initially agreed, but called it off when she discovered the ring was stolen. Rejected, a heartbroken Eli stole her taxi and ended up knocking over a pedestrian who was revealed to be an ex-girlfriend, Danielle Hutch. Eli had served time in prison for Danielle, but he still had feelings for her and they slept together. It turned out that Danielle was on the run from local criminals the McFarlanes, who she'd stolen drugs from. Danielle was then arrested by Shane Doyle who was working for the McFarlanes. Eli tried looking for her, only to find her at a McFarlane-run nightclub. He tried rescuing her, but Danielle hurt his feelings to make him leave. When Chas Dingle's (Lucy Pargeter) young son, Aaron Dingle (Danny Miller) was being kept as a drugs mule by the McFarlanes, Danielle tipped off the Dingles in order for them to rescue him.

That same night, Debbie and Jasmine Thomas (Jenna-Louise Coleman) had uncovered the truth about Shane Doyle and when he attempted to rape Jasmine, she had bludgeoned him to death. Trying to conceal the crime, Debbie went to find Eli and took him back to the crime scene. Horrified, he eventually agreed to help and they disposed of Shane's body in the lake. The body was found in January 2009 and Ross Kirk (Samuel Anderson) was arrested after Marlon implicated him following his affair with Marlon's former wife, Donna Windsor (Verity Rushworth). Desperate to free her lover, Donna became suspicious of a guilty Eli and turned him in to the police. He was released, but his unusually withdrawn behaviour worried Zak and Eli started to reveal the truth, but was rearrested before he could. Faced with a life sentence, Eli cracked and confessed everything to the police. Debbie and Jasmine had been planning to run away together and leave Eli to his fate, but his confession led to Debbie being arrested whilst Jasmine escaped. When Zak realised that Eli has told the police the truth, he attacked him and declared him dead to the Dingle family.

Only Marlon stuck by Eli and took him into his house. Eli tried, but failed to correct his mistake and free Debbie. He tried changing his statement and then ran away from home when that went wrong. Marlon found him sleeping rough and convinced him to come back home. They then tracked Jasmine down to Scotland and tried to convince her to hand herself in, but were interrupted when her grandfather Sandy Thomas (Freddie Jones) entered, wielding a gun. When he found out that Danielle was now in the same prison wing as Debbie, Eli concocted a plan to free both her and Debbie. However, Debbie refused to leave and Danielle was later caught and returned to prison. A guilty Jasmine returned and confessed the truth, leading to Debbie's release a few weeks later. However, Debbie's distress at Jasmine's sentence upset Eli who thought she would now hate him. Depressed about this and Danielle's arrest, he broke down in tears to Marlon and made an emotional speech about how much he secretly hated how he was, before deciding it was best for him to leave the village.

A couple of months later, Laurel Thomas (Charlotte Bellamy) found him living on the streets. He was filthy and confessed he had not eaten in days, but revealed he didn't dare to go home. She told Marlon, who went to bring Eli home, but Eli refused, saying that he was cursed and caused his family nothing but misery. Marlon told Eli that he loved him and the two brothers shared a tearful hug before Eli returned to the village to discover that his family were happy welcome him back. Eli moved back in with Marlon, who took in a new lodger called Lizzie Lakely (Kitty McGeever). Eli was initially jealous and suspicious of Lizzie, but they eventually became friends. He was involved in several dodgy schemes before his friendship with Priya Sharma (Fiona Wade) saw him securing a steady job at the Sharma's sweet factory. Eli developed a slight crush on Priya, but it was not reciprocated.

When Sam developed feelings for illegal Ukrainian immigrant Olena Petrovich, Zak asked Eli to spy on them. This eventually led to Eli and Olena becoming good friends and she confessed that she did not return Sam's intense feelings for her, but was scared to tell him the truth. Sam picked up on the closeness between the two and became jealous and ever more possessive. Sam decided to propose to Olena so that she could stay in the country and tried to get Cain to obtain a fake passport. Concerned, Zak warned Olena to leave town rather than hurt his son. If she did not, he would turn her into the authorities himself.

Faced with losing Olena, Eli now confessed that he was also in love with her and Olena claimed that she was also falling in love with Eli. They shared a passionate kiss and made a pact to elope. Marlon realised something was going on between them and angrily confronted Eli who tearfully declared that he loved Olena and wanted to help her and her family. Marlon demanded that they tell Sam the truth, but Sam saw the pair kissing in a field and was left heartbroken, In revenge, he reported Olena to Border Control and she was arrested in front of a horrified Eli. Upset, Eli got drunk and began to accuse the other villagers of reporting her, before Sam confessed that it was him. A furious Eli threw a glass at his cousin's head before being dragged away by Marlon, who told him it was partly his own fault for becoming involved with a woman Sam cared for and for not telling Sam the truth. When Eli confronted Sam, Zak threatened him and told Eli that he was no longer a Dingle. In retaliation Eli told Sam that Zak had already ordered Olena to leave town.

Depressed following the loss of Olena, Eli quit his job. He received a letter from Olena revealing that she was back home, but unhappy. Eli told Marlon that Olena had been his one chance of happiness and it had lasted a week and then been taken away from him – just like that. He then sank further into a downward spiral and began to steal again. With Marlon demanding rent, he decided to rob the cash box from the B&B. He made so much noise that he woke up a drunken Eric Pollard (Chris Chittell), who fell down the stairs and knocked himself unconscious. Horrified, Eli tried to wake him and then struggled with his conscience before greed got the better of him and he took the cash box and ran. As Sam had been the one to find Eric, he was blamed for the theft. Eli planned to run away, but Marlon caught him and warned his brother that he had better get Sam out of this mess. Eli was about to leave, when he had second thoughts and advised Marlon that he was going away forever, so that he would not keep screwing things up for everyone around him.

Eli then revealed himself to be the thief, before apologising to Sam. He left before he could be arrested and Marlon followed him, begging his brother not to leave on bad terms. The two had an emotional discussion about their childhood before Marlon kissed his brother goodbye. Eli returned the cash box to Marlon, which was later discovered to be empty apart from a note which read "IOU £400". Eli was last seen leaving the village. He took one last tearful look back, then turned and walked away.

== Casting ==
Eli was introduced by series producer Kathleen Beedles in 2006 as the previously unmentioned younger brother of Marlon Dingle and the youngest son of Albert Dingle. Joe Gilgun and Matthew Wolfenden (who went on to play David Metcalfe) were shortlisted for the role of Eli. However, the producers decided that Gilgun was more suited to this role. Before starting on Emmerdale, Gilgun was working as a plasterer and described joining the soap as "a dream come true".

== Development ==
=== Personality ===
Eli had a history of getting himself and others into trouble. Scruffy, lazy and impulsive his criminal activities ranged from petty shoplifting to armed robbery. Loud and jovial, Eli was generally portrayed as an immature, lovable rogue who refused to take any responsibility for himself. He also had a far more dangerous, vindictive streak but could sometimes display a sensitive, thoughtful side as well. He had a tendency to fall in love easily and was drawn to women who needed his help. The character hinted at a troubled upbringing including time spent in a Young Offenders Institute. On more than one occasion, he acknowledged that he did not like the person he was, but felt unable to change.

=== Departure ===
In November 2009, Gilgun announced his decision to quit in order to pursue other projects, including This Is England '86. He was "sad to leave", but felt it was time to move on. An Emmerdale spokeswoman confirmed his departure but added that they were not "ruling out" the possibility of him returning to the show. Gilgun since admitted that he'd "had enough" of Emmerdale and felt that it was mutual. He said that there was not much more that could be done with the character of Eli.

== Reception ==
For his role as Eli, Gilgun was nominated for "Best Newcomer" at the 2007 Inside Soap Awards.
