= Brenda Walker (Emmerdale) =

Fictional character from Emmerdale

- Emmerdale character
- Portrayed by: Lesley Dunlop
- Duration: 2008–2025
- First appearance: Episode 4953; 2 April 2008
- Last appearance: Episode 10259; 4 April 2025
- Introduced by: Keith Richardson
In-universe information
- Other names: Wendy
- Occupation: Postmistress; Shop assistant; Café Waitress; Businesswoman; B&B worker
- Husband: Bernard Walker (backstory); Bob Hope (2018–2019)
- Adoptive daughters: Gennie Walker
- Stepsons: Heath Hope
- Stepdaughters: Cathy Hope
- Granddaughters: Molly Sharma (adoptive)

Brenda Walker is a fictional character from the British ITV soap opera Emmerdale, played by Lesley Dunlop. She made her first appearance on 2 April 2008. She was introduced as the adoptive mother to Gennie Walker (Sian Reese-Williams). In 2013, Brenda was diagnosed with a brain tumour, one of the character's biggest storylines. On 8 November 2024 it was announced that Brenda would be leaving the soap after 17 years with her final scenes set to air in the new year. Her final scenes aired on 4 April 2025 when she left to go on a cruise.

== Characterisation ==
On her ITV character profile, Brenda is described as "a fun-loving, bubbly character" who leaves people speechless with certain things she says. She is also billed as "caring, dizzy, fun, [and] generous". It states that due to being involved with Bob and the café, she is "connected to many areas of Emmerdale". Having been diagnosed with a brain tumour, Brenda realises that the important things in life are "family, friendship, love, honesty and humour". The profile adds that Brenda likes Emily Brontë and wearing hats, and dislikes "fuss".

== Departure ==
On 8 November 2024, after 17 years in Emmerdale, it was announced that Brenda would be leaving the soap. Her departure announcement followed that of Dunlop's co-star Roxy Shahidi, who plays Leyla Harding. A source told The Mirror: "There have been so many exits recently and the talk is of more. With people like Lesley and Roxy potentially in the mix, nobody feels safe." They continued: "The show has grown a lot bigger in recent years but soaps are expensive to make. It's inevitable saving money means losing people – but it's a huge shame all the same for those involved, their friends and colleagues."

== Storylines ==
Brenda first appears when she visits Gennie in hospital. She is friendly with Paddy Kirk (Dominic Brunt) only to recoil when she learns he was responsible for the accident. After Gennie recovers, Brenda goes home. When Gennie gets to know her biological father Shadrach Dingle (Andy Devine) and his family, Brenda is upset. Brenda returns and is concerned by the way Gennie has changed. Gennie refuses to go home with Brenda, who affirms that she will stay until Gennie changes her mind. Gennie gets a job at Eric Pollard's (Chris Chittell) factory, and Brenda begins working at the Post Office/Café in the village, working for Bob Hope (Tony Audenshaw). Bob moves in with his son Jamie Hope (Alex Carter) and their former in law Terry Woods (Billy Hartman) which they rent out his flat so Brenda rents it for her and Gennie. Brenda and Bob initially clash when Brenda tries to remodel the café, but Brenda soon develops feelings for Bob. When Bob realises her feelings, he decides to fix her up with Terry Woods (Billy Hartman). Brenda is reluctant, but to convince Gennie that she had no feelings for Bob, she kisses Terry. Brenda then becomes more interested in Terry. When they begin a relationship, Brenda becomes concerned that Terry's young son T.J. Woods (Connor Lee) does not like her, as he frequently interrupts them. Brenda tries bribing him but stopped when Terry opens his lunch box one day and found it packed with sweets. Douglas Potts (Duncan Preston) and Brenda work on a project for the children of the village. Known as Emmerdale Explorers and funded by Natasha Wylde (Amanda Donohoe), they come up with various games and crafts.

After Terry dies in a fire, Brenda starts a relationship with Bob and is given a granddaughter after Gennie gives birth to her and her fiancé Nikhil Sharma's (Rik Makarem) baby, Molly. Brenda is diagnosed with a brain tumour after losing concentration at the wheel of a car and almost running over rival Val. The doctors advise Brenda to have surgery, but she refuses, much to Gennie's anxiety. Brenda decides not to tell Bob, but confides in his friend Dan Spencer (Liam Fox), leading to Bob thinking that Brenda is having an affair with Dan, and the two men coming to blows outside the café. Brenda reveals that she has a brain tumour, and Bob tells her he will stand by her no matter what. Brenda decides not to have surgery, but after constant nagging from Gennie to have it, Brenda agrees. Nikhil and Gennie bring the date of their wedding forward, which angers Brenda and she tells Gennie that she will not be attending. Brenda also decides not to have surgery to remove the cancer. This leaves Gennie heartbroken, and at the altar just as she is about to marry Nikhil, she has a change of heart, saying she does not want to get married without her mother there. Brenda does eventually attend, but collapses and suffers a seizure whilst there. She is rushed to hospital, but she is told she will be fine. Afterwards, Brenda tells Gennie that she will have surgery.

Brenda goes to hospital to have her brain tumour removed, with Gennie, Bob, Nikhil and Dan waiting anxiously. The wait proves too much to Gennie, revealing to Nikhil that she wishes she never pushed Brenda to have surgery. Brenda survives the operation, but has to wait a few weeks before she is told whether the cancer has fully been removed. Brenda is told by the hospital that the cancer could be reoccurring, which unnerves Brenda. She undergoes chemotherapy in the hope that the tumour will not return, but is devastated when her hair starts falling out. She pleas with Gennie to shave all of her hair off, which leaves both Brenda and Gennie distraught. Brenda is reluctant to show Bob her head, but Bob reassures a worried Brenda that he will always love her, with or without hair, so she reveals her head, and the pair passionately kiss. Bob later proposes to her, which she accepts. After their wedding, Brenda and Bob are at the Woolpack where the police, along with Debbie and Jai appear. They tell them, Chas Dingle (Lucy Pargeter) and Nikhil that Gennie has died. They reveal that Gennie was in a car accident at the time, but really Chas' serial killer fiancé Cameron Murray (Dominic Power) suffocated Gennie after her crash as she overheard him admitting to killing Carl King (Tom Lister) the previous year. Following this, Brenda becomes good friends with Kerry Wyatt (Laura Norton).

== Reception ==
For her role as Brenda, Dunlop was nominated for "Best Actor" at the first Radio Times Soap Awards in 2024.
