= Daisy Campbell (actress, born 2003) =

English actress (born 2003)

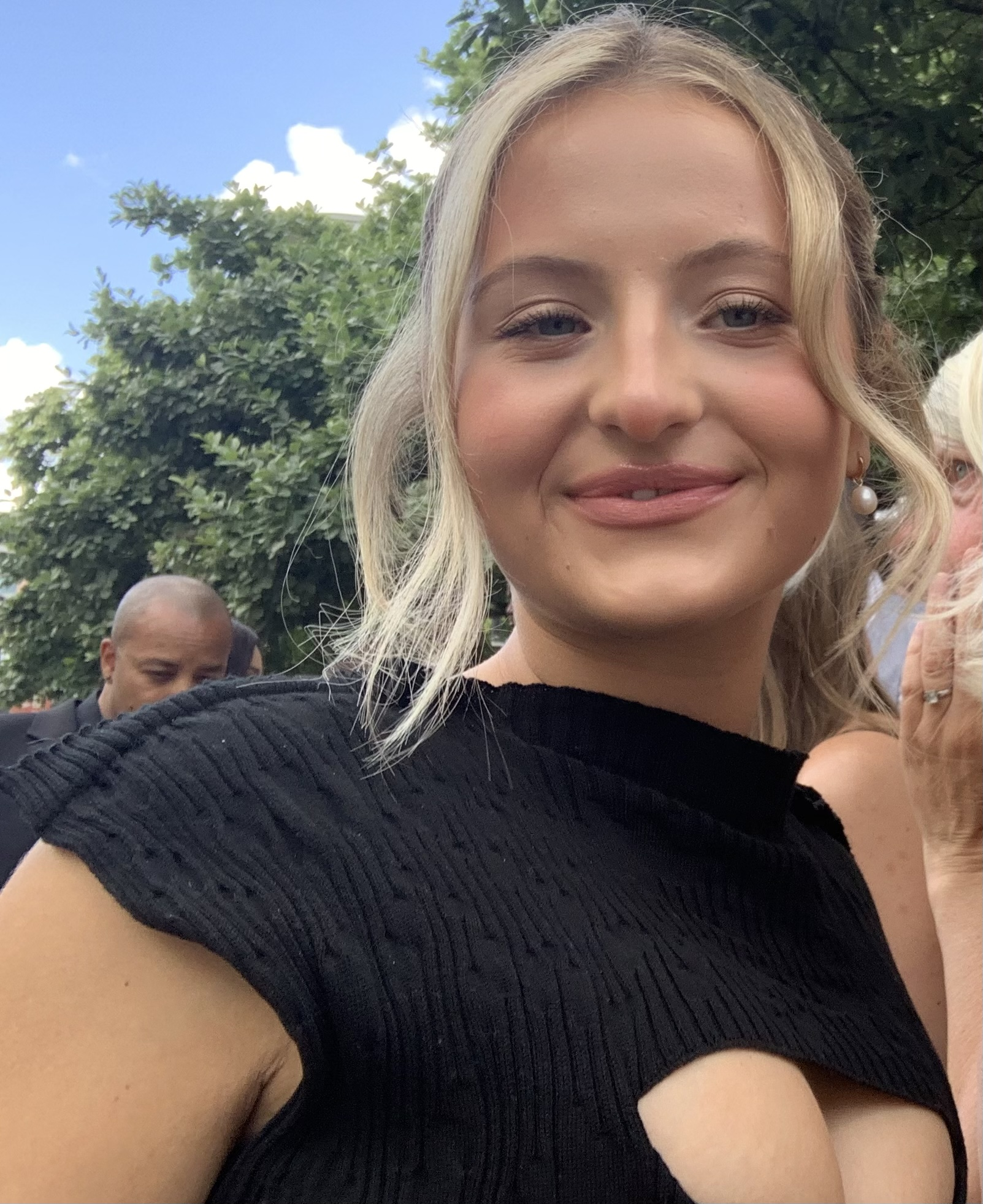
- Campbell in 2022
- Born: Daisy Arwen Campbell; 28 July 2003 (age 23); Methley, Leeds, England
- Occupation: Actress
- Years active: 2011–present
- Television: Emmerdale

Daisy Arwen Campbell (born 28 July 2003) is an English actress, known for playing Amelia Spencer on the ITV1 soap opera Emmerdale. She was cast on the soap in 2011 at the age of seven and appeared continuously until 2024.

== Early and personal life ==
Daisy Arwen Campbell was born on 28 July 2003 in Methley, Leeds. Campbell has a younger brother who also acts, as well as a sister who is a national dance champion. Campbell studied at the Rebel Acting School in Leeds and was represented by Scala School of Performing Arts.

In 2024, following her exit from Emmerdale, she confirmed that she was in a relationship with a man named Nick, someone whom she had met at school. Of their relationship, she said: "Finding love just happens when you don’t expect it. I first met Nick at school — he was a couple of years above me. It's been a tough year. But now this has come out of the blue and I couldn't be happier."

== Career ==
In 2011, at the age of 7, Campbell began her professional career as a child actress when she was cast on Emmerdale. She was introduced as Amelia Spencer, the niece of fellow newcomer Rachel Breckle (Gemma Oaten). Her storylines in the soap since joining have included Amelia's Christian faith, suffering from an eating disorder, becoming pregnant and giving birth as a teen mother, being groomed, stalked and losing her guardian to prison.

On 29 October 2024, it was announced that Campbell had been axed from the soap after 13 years. Amelia's final scenes aired in December of that year. Campbell was sad to have been written out of Emmerdale but expressed that she felt the perfect age to try something new. Her first role following her exit was revealed to be a guest appearance in the BBC medical drama series Casualty. The episode aired in June 2025.

== Filmography ==
Year	Title	Role	Notes	Ref.
2011–2024	Emmerdale	Amelia Spencer	Regular role	
2021	Coronation Street	Amelia Spencer	1 episode	
2025	Casualty	Georgina Birch	1 episode	

== Awards and nominations ==
Year	Award	Category	Result	Ref.
2018	Inside Soap Awards	Best Young Actor	Nominated	
