= List of Emmerdale characters introduced in 2011 =

The following is a list of characters that first appeared in the British soap opera Emmerdale in 2011, by order of first appearance. All characters were introduced by the soap's executive producer, Steve Frost.

== Flynn Buchanan ==
Flynn Buchanan
- Emmerdale character
- Portrayed by: Ryan Prescott
- First appearance: 31 January 2011
- Last appearance: 14 September 2011
- Introduced by: Steve Frost

Flynn Buchanan, played by Ryan Prescott, made his first on-screen appearance on 31 January 2011. Flynn was introduced as a love interest for Aaron Livesy (Danny Miller). The character and casting were announced in January 2011. Prescott landed the role of Flynn shortly after graduating with a performing arts degree. He began filming his first scenes in late November 2010. Prescott told The Champion that he had been recognised from being in Emmerdale. He said "The storyline in Emmerdale was so big already that it's brought a lot of publicity, I signed my first couple of autographs the other day which was weird." He added that he had enjoyed his time on the set. In August 2011, it was announced Prescott would be returning to Emmerdale for a one off guest appearance in September 2011.

Flynn meets Aaron in a gay nightclub in Hotten. Flynn spots Aaron playing a game of pool with his friend Adam Barton (Adam Thomas). Flynn challenges Aaron to a game and wins. Adam buys Flynn a drink along with Aaron's. Flynn makes a pass at Aaron and gives him his phone number. Although Aaron initially rejects him and goes home, it is later revealed that Flynn has sent a text to Aaron asking him out for another date. The two continue to date over the following weeks when Flynn comes back from a trip away and has an awkward meeting in The Woolpack with Aaron's ex-boyfriend Jackson Walsh (Marc Silcock) who had asked Aaron to introduce him to Flynn. The following week, however, whilst they are on a date, Aaron begins to feel awkward and tells Flynn that he still wants to be with Jackson and regrets ending their relationship. Flynn tells Aaron that he is glad that he was finally being honest with him. Aaron ends his relationship with Flynn and reconciles with Jackson. A few months later, Adam spots Flynn on a night out. They go over to see Aaron and Flynn tells him he is glad to see him. They talk about Jackson's death and Aaron leaves Flynn alone in the bar.

== Steve Kelly ==
Steve Kelly
- Emmerdale character
- Portrayed by: Andy Walker
- First appearance: 25 February 2011
- Last appearance: 15 July 2011
- Introduced by: Steve Frost
In-universe information
- Wife: Annie Kelly

Steve Kelly, played by Andy Walker, made his first on-screen appearance on 25 February 2011. Steve is a quadriplegic who tries to show Jackson Walsh that being disabled does not have to be a negative thing.

Walker was approached about appearing in Emmerdale by the charity Back-Up Trust. He was scheduled to appear in five episodes and he said "Getting a part in Emmerdale is part of me going forward in my life." Walker was paralysed from the neck down after an accident in Goa in 2006. He broke his neck when he dived into the sea and hit his head on the sand. Walker's character, Steve, was introduced to Emmerdale to show Jackson Walsh (Marc Silcock) that he has a life to live after being paralysed. Of his part, Walker said "I play the same role in the programme as I do in life, showing that disability doesn't necessarily have to be a negative thing." He added that Steve will tell Jackson that he can still go on holiday, take him to a football game and meet him in the pub.

== Cameron Murray ==
Cameron Murray
- Emmerdale character
- Portrayed by: Dominic Power
- Duration: 2011–2013
- First appearance: 3 March 2011
- Last appearance: 17 October 2013
- Introduced by: Steve Frost
In-universe information
- Occupation: Haulage driver (2011, 2013); Barman (2012, 2013); Mechanic (2012–2013)
- Wife: Anna Murray (until 2011)
- Sons: Dylan Murray; Harry Murray

Cameron Murray, played by Dominic Power, made his first screen appearance on 3 March 2011. The character and casting was announced on 21 December 2010. Digital Spy said sparks will fly between Debbie Dingle (Charley Webb) and Cameron and it becomes clear that they have a shared history. Debbie is unhappy to see Cameron in the village. Of his character, Power said "Cameron is a strong, sharp-tongued and defiant character, and he has a darker, edgier side to him."

When Debbie becomes pregnant by her ex-boyfriend Andy Sugden (Kelvin Fletcher) to get a bone marrow donor for her sick daughter, Cameron cannot handle it. Debbie's aunt, Chas Dingle (Lucy Pargeter) becomes his confidant and they grow close. When Marlon Dingle (Mark Charnock) annoys Cameron, he is annoyed about the situation with Debbie and picks a fight with Marlon. Chas then defuses their fracas and she makes Cameron talk about his issues. A spokesperson for the serial told Susan Hill of Daily Star that there is "a slight spark of chemistry" between Cameron and Chas and that as the storyline develops it becomes "very interesting". Cameron keeps offloading his problems onto Chas. The pair get more acquainted and "the more time they spend together the closer they get". They eventually kiss and Chas feels guilty. Gemma Graham and Jon Horsley of TV Buzz quipped that "it doesn't get much classier than getting it on with your pregnant niece’s boyfriend in a pub cellar." They added that Cameron and Chas were right to feel guilty and predicted that the situation "isn't going to end well". Though the writers jumped to the couple's defence because they had attempted to ignore their feelings. On Digital Spy's 2012 end of year reader poll, Cameron and Chas' affair was voted fourth in the "Best Storyline" category, receiving 8.9% of the vote.

Cameron comes to the village after tracking Debbie down, telling her that he has left his wife and sons for her. Debbie tells him that their affair was a mistake. Carl King (Tom Lister) gives Cameron a job at Emmerdale Haulage and he catches the eye of Eve Jenson (Suzanne Shaw). Debbie finally gives into Cameron and they get back together. He also moves into Tug Ghyll with her and her daughter, Sarah (Sophia Amber Moore), and Andy Sugden (Kelvin Fletcher), Sarah's father, is jealous of Debbie and Cameron's relationship. Cameron also starts a fight with Debbie's father, Cain Dingle (Jeff Hordley) and tries to persuade Cain not to interfere in his and Debbie's relationship.

Debbie learns Cameron had another affair after she left Jersey, but he insists it meant nothing and is delighted when Debbie tells him that she is pregnant but miscarries not long afterwards. Cameron tries to support her and not let his feelings show. His sons, Dylan and Harry, come to stay for a few days. Sarah becomes sick and they learn she has a rare genetic disorder. Cameron hires his own truck and starts poaching the King's customers. Carl attacks Cameron's truck and Cameron then plots to ruin the Kings. Cameron, Cain and Charity Dingle (Emma Atkins) steal the Kings' haulage trucks and sell them off. Cameron then wipes all the files containing contracts from Carl's computer. This prompts Cain to tell Cameron he is part of the Dingle clan. Sarah falls ill and Debbie realises that she needs to conceive a saviour sibling with Andy. Cameron is unhappy when he learns they had sex together. Cameron embarks on an affair with Chas Dingle and promises to leave Debbie for her. Carl later discovers the affair and begins blackmailing Cameron and Chas for money. Cameron becomes desperate to raise the amount and he and Chas attempt to rob The Woolpack. Cameron later fights with Carl and hits him over the head with a brick, killing him. Cameron does not admit to killing Carl and Chas is charged with his murder. Consumed with guilt, he confesses the truth to Alex Moss (Kurtis Stacey). Cameron is then relieved to hear that Chas has been acquitted, but he suspects Alex may go to the police, so he takes Alex hostage in a haulage van. Alex escapes and runs through the woods but Cameron is too quick and catches Alex before dragging him back to the van. As Alex ran, Cameron cannot risk him going to the police so kills him in the van. Cameron is later seen burying Alex in the woods along with his bag of clothes he stole. However, later work begins on the site where Alex is buried so Cameron returns to the gravesite and unearths Alex' decaying corpse and moves it to a different location and burns Alex' bag before returning to the village.

Cameron shocks the Dingles' and proposes to Chas and they get engaged. Cameron flies his sons over from Jersey to meet Chas properly but when the boys run and hide at Debbie's, Cameron begins to doubt his choice between Chas and Debbie but when Debbie kidnaps the boys and forces Moira to miscarry, Cameron is shocked when Dylan and Harry refuse to be in the same room with Chas as they believe she killed Carl and Cameron realizes he can never reveal his true secret because of the boys. Cameron and Chas aim to buy the Woolpack but when Cameron's ex-wife Anna refuses to let Cameron see his boys, they are forced to use the money to apply for custody.

Cameron begins to feel sorry for Debbie when Andy takes Jack and Sarah away and the pair share a kiss but are almost caught by Chas. Cameron persuades Debbie not to flee and the pair sleep together. He later learns that Debbie almost murdered Chas by holding her a gunpoint whilst he was away in Jersey. Gennie notices a connection between both Cameron and Debbie as they begin to get close again and she tries to get the evidence she needs to prove to Chas that she's right by breaking into Debbie's house to record the pair. However, she gets more than she bargained for as Cameron confesses to the murder of Carl to Debbie. After reconciling their relationship, they both head to the Woolpack to tell Chas that they've reunited but are shocked to see Gennie emerging from the house. They suddenly realise she overheard the confession and chase her. A scared Gennie gets into her car but are quickly pursued by Cameron and Debbie. However, Gennie's car spirals out of control and she's involved in a huge car crash. Panicking, Debbie calls the police while Cameron helps a badly injured Gennie out of wrecked car. Knowing she could expose his secret, Cameron claims his third victim and suffocates a critically injured Gennie.

Cameron proposes to Debbie and she nearly accepts. but Debbie manages to get Cameron talking about Carl and Gennie's deaths. She tells him that she will forgive him if he tells her what really happened. Cameron then explains how he put his hand over Gennie's mouth and killed her. Debbie screams out a code word and Cameron realises that the police are watching him. He holds Debbie hostage and threatens to kill her. Debbie tries to reason with Cameron, but then she asks if Alex deserved it. Cameron drags Debbie up the stairs, but she pushes him down, injuring him. Debbie escapes and Cameron is arrested.

In early October 2013, Cameron escapes from prison. Debbie's house is guarded by policemen at all times. Cameron tricks the police in thinking he has escaped to another country by appearing on CCTV at a ferry port, but then moves out the way of the camera and makes his way to Emmerdale. After kidnapping Sarah, he enters The Woolpack with a double barrel shotgun, which he stole from Zak Dingle's (Steve Halliwell) van, which his son Sam (James Hooton) had parked and holds various villagers at gunpoint. Unbeknownst to him, the gun only has 4 bullets. After threatening to shoot Zak, he accidentally shoots Alicia Harding (Natalie Anderson), one of the hostages. The remaining hostages plead with Cameron to let her go so she can be treated, and he eventually lets her go free with David Metcalfe (Matthew Wolfenden). Finally Cameron lets the rest of the hostages out except for Debbie and Chas, and a dramatic struggle between the three of them causes him to shoot through a window using the last of his bullets. Unaware that all his bullets have gone, he asks Chas and Debbie to decide between them which one should die and counts down from 10. He then had no bullets left but then reloaded the gun. Later on, Marlon woke up and knocked Cameron out and held him at gunpoint as Debbie and Chas tried to escape through the cellar. After the power kept going on and off Cameron and Marlon struggled and Cameron was presumably shot in the process only to appear in the cellar later on. He tried numerous times to drown Debbie, Chas and Marlon. Marlon later escaped and the police then finally broke into the pub as they tried to rescue Debbie and Chas by cutting into the cellar, Chas was able to escape but Cameron captured Debbie once more. He then attempted to drown her, but she escaped. He tried to grab Debbie's leg once more, but fails and ends up grabbing onto a light bulb - which electrocutes Cameron to death as a result and his reign of terror at Emmerdale is finally over. The following morning, his body is taken away and Debbie makes peace with Chas so that the pair can move on with their lives without Cameron.

The character is subsequently referenced as time goes on, most specifically when Cameron's voice is later heard by Chas from late November 2015 - after she accidentally stabs Diane.

== Elliot Windsor ==
Elliot Windsor
- Emmerdale character
- Portrayed by: Oliver Brooke (2011); Jackson Charles Cummins (2012); Luca Hoyle (2016–present)
- Duration: 2011–2012, 2016–2024, 2026–present
- First appearance: 28 March 2011
- Introduced by: Steve Frost
In-universe information
- Father: Jimmy King
- Mother: Kelly Windsor
- Adoptive mother: Nicola King
- Half-brothers: Carl Holliday
- Half-sisters: Angelica King
- Grandfathers: Tom King; Vic Windsor
- Uncles: Carl King; Matthew King; Max King
- Aunts: Donna Windsor; Scarlett Nicholls
- First cousins: Thomas King; Anya King; April Windsor

Elliot Windsor made his first on screen appearance on 28 March 2011. He is the son of Kelly Windsor (Adele Silva) and Jimmy King (Nick Miles). Kelly brings Elliot with her when she moves back to the village and introduces him to her ex-fiancé, Jimmy, whom she claims is Elliot's father. Kelly reveals that Elliot was born after she left the village and Jimmy had not known about him until Kelly got back in touch with him. Jimmy's wife Nicola King (Nicola Wheeler) later discovers about Jimmy being the father of Elliot and she kicks him out. Kelly and Jimmy sit down with Elliot and try to explain to him that Jimmy is his father. Elliot departs with his mother.

He returns in April 2012 after Kelly decides to go to America with her new boyfriend. Bob Hope (Tony Audenshaw) brings Elliot to Jimmy to look after. In July 2012, Kelly takes Elliot back and they both go to Los Angeles where she is now living, leaving Jimmy and Nicola heartbroken. In 2016, Kelly once again leaves Elliot in Jimmy's care. After being offscreen for two years since 2024, Elliot returned in 2026.

== Alex Moss ==
Alex Moss
- Emmerdale character
- Portrayed by: Kurtis Stacey
- Duration: 2011–2012
- First appearance: 12 April 2011
- Last appearance: 25 December 2012
- Introduced by: Steve Frost
In-universe information
- Occupation: Farmhand (2011–2012); Mechanic (2012)
- Grandmothers: Beattie Dixon

Alex Moss played by Kurtis Stacey, made his first on-screen appearance on 12 April 2011. Alex is a farmhand employed by John Barton (James Thornton) to work at Butler's Farm. Stacey's part in Emmerdale is his first major television role. Stacey admitted that he was nervous about making his debut and was worried that he would be replaced by a new actor. He told Holy Soap, "I didn't know what to expect about working on set and how the directors would work. I tried to be as calm and cool as I could and keep my performance natural." During a March 2011 interview with Digital Spy, Executive Producer Steve November commented on Stacey's casting and his character. He described Alex as "a young guy, a working-class farmhand who arrives in the village. He's not unattractive by any means, so he'll be a bit of a heart-throb and romantic lead, break a few hearts, and provide some great stories for our younger women and girls." Alex has also been called a "hunk" and Stacey revealed that he gets into trouble because "he is single and out to enjoy himself." The actor explained that Alex is a regular guy who comes from a troubled background, his family is a touchy subject and this results in him shutting people out. Stacey also revealed that if Alex has a secret then it is most likely to have something to do with his family.

The Press Association reported that Alex would get off on the wrong foot with Adam Barton (Adam Thomas) shortly after his arrival. Alex gains John's approval as he begins working on the farm and this "riles up" Adam. Of the situation, Stacey said "I don't think he'll get on with Adam because he replaces Adam on the farm – Adam sees him arrive and work really hard and is annoyed that he's good." Alex also catches the eye of Adam's sister, Hannah (Grace Cassidy), and Adam does not like it. Stacey added that Alex will become friends with Andy Sugden (Kelvin Fletcher) and he is initially the only person Alex knows in the village. The locals are a little suspicious of Alex at first. When asked how Alex got the job with John, Stacey explained, "Andy knew his dad and knows Alex is a hard worker so he recommends him. When he gets the job as a farmhand, he moves into the caravan." Stacey later revealed that he would be involved with another female character. He said "she's a bit of a naughty one [...] it could be anyone with Alex. Alex is just waiting for the next woman or girl, whoever turns up, he's after them." He stated that Alex needs a female partner with a backbone that can sort him out. If Alex enters a serious relationship, he opined viewers would then see Alex is "a good boy". Holy Soap have branded him a "hunky farmhand" that had "shaken up Emmerdale's female folk since arriving".

On 30 November 2012, it was announced that Cameron Murray (Dominic Power) would murder a village resident, shortly after confessing to them that he killed Carl King (Tom Lister) earlier in the year. Daniel Kilkelly from Digital Spy stated "Show bosses are hoping to keep the identity of Cameron's second victim under wraps until transmission in a must-see episode next month." On 20 December, Cameron was seen confessing his secret to Alex. After worrying that Alex was going to go to the police, Cameron hit him and held him captive in his van. David Brown from the Radio Times commented, "will Alex be the one to meet an untimely end?" On 24 December, Cameron killed Alex by strangling him to death, after he tried to escape from him and buries him in the woods. Brown called the scenes "chilling". Stacey later commented that his exit storyline was one that did not come around often and he wanted it. He also thanked the viewers for their support. On 23 August 2013, Alex's body is identified by the police after Katie Macey (Sammy Winward) makes an anonymous phone call to the police saying a dead body had been discovered but disregarded by Declan Macey (Jason Merrells).

== Nicky Pritchard ==
Nicky Pritchard
- Emmerdale character
- Portrayed by: Matt Milburn
- First appearance: 26 May 2011
- Last appearance: 24 November 2011
- Introduced by: Steve Frost
In-universe information
- Occupation: Vet

Nicky Pritchard played by Matt Milburn, made his first on-screen appearance on 26 May 2011. Nicky arrives in the village as the new locum vet, hired by Paddy Kirk (Dominic Brunt). Nicky is described as being "gorgeous" and Paddy's partner, Rhona (Zoe Henry) is impressed by him. Milburn has described Nicky as being "very confident and cocky about pretty much everything." Nicky will depart in November 2011.

Nicky develops feelings for Gennie Walker (Sian Reese-Williams). Milburn said Gennie's personality is "very endearing to Nicky", he thinks she is "very cute". Nicky does not realise that Gennie is in love with Nikhil Sharma (Rik Makarem). Nicky and Nikhil act "quite macho and testosterone-fuelled" when together, but because of Nicky is so confident, he does not see him as competition. Gennie accepts Nicky's offer of a date after an argument with Nikhil. Nicky behaves in a "cheeky, forward and no-nonsense" manner, which results in the pair having a good time. However, Nikhil see them and becomes jealous. Milburn said that "Nicky's part of a kind of love triangle he has no idea about." Nicky is deeply touched by Gennie, it is the first time another woman has made "him feel different". While Nicky has had many previous relationships, none have compared to the effect Gennie has on him. Makarem said it has "taken someone of Nicky's calibre, of all his charm and charisma" to take an interest in Gennie, to wake Nikhil up to his own feelings for her.

Makarem later said that Nikhil knows that Gennie does not love Nicky. Nikhil is "suspicious that Nicky's not to be trusted because of his charm and charisma and ease with the ladies." Nikhil thinks that Nicky is cheating on Gennie after he sees him kissing someone. However, this kiss was innocent while greeting his sister-in-law. Nikhil tries to prevoke Nicky into "doing something that gives him away", but when the kiss is revealed to be innocent, Gennie accuses Nikhil of setting Nicky up. A fight in The Woolpack then ensues - because Nikhil is "scared" that he has lost Gennie. Makerem opined that Nikhil thinks Nicky cannot "possibly love her the way he does".

After Nikhil confesses his love for Gennie and she reciprocates and ends her relationship with Nicky, he decides that there is nothing else for him left in Emmerdale as Rhona is back working at the vet's. Because of this, he leaves the village. Nicky later contacts Paddy asking for a reference for a job in New Zealand, but Paddy gives him a bad reference so he can take the job instead.

== Leo Goskirk ==
Leo Goskirk
- Emmerdale character
- Portrayed by: Theo Tasker (2011); Harry Whittaker (2011–2014); Harvey Rogerson (2012–present)
- Duration: 2011–present
- First appearance: 31 May 2011
- Introduced by: Steve Frost
In-universe information
- Father: Marlon Dingle
- Mother: Rhona Goskirk
- Stepfather: Paddy Kirk
- Stepmother: Laurel Thomas; Jessie Grant
- Half-sisters: April Windsor; Ivy Malcolms
- Grandfathers: Albert Dingle
- Grandmothers: Mary Goskirk
- Nieces: Rebecca Windsor
- Other relatives: Aaron Livesy; Chas Dingle; Zak Dingle; Cain Dingle; Belle Dingle; Charity Dingle; Debbie Dingle; Noah Dingle; Moses Dingle; Ryan Stocks; Sarah Sugden; Jack Sugden; Nate Robinson; Eve Dingle; Leyla Sugden

Leo Goskirk, played by both Theo Tasker and Harry Whittaker, made his first on-screen appearance on 31 May 2011.

Rhona Goskirk (Zoë Henry) realises she is pregnant shortly after ending her relationship with Marlon Dingle (Mark Charnock). During a scan, Rhona and Marlon are told that their baby has Down's syndrome. Rhona chooses to keep the baby; and she, Marlon and her new partner Paddy Kirk (Dominic Brunt) decide to share the parental responsibilities. Henry told the Daily Mirror that there were two baby boys playing Leo. They were not twins, which is the usual practice when casting for babies on-screen; but they both had Down syndrome. Henry said that she was "really excited" to get the storyline because it is telling a real story that happens to real people.

The babies who initially portrayed Leo were Theo Tasker and Harry Whittaker (nephew of actress Jodie Whittaker). Tasker's mother, Dee, told the Ballymoney and Moyle Times that she was delighted her 12-week-old baby was helping to send out a positive message about Down syndrome. She said: "It is great that Theo can help people see that a baby born Down syndrome is just the same as any other child who laughs, smiles and is a great wee character." Tasker said that a woman at the Child Development Unit said Emmerdale were looking for a baby with Down Syndrome to play the role of Leo and they were invited along to meet the crew. Tasker explained that she and her husband did not want to get involved initially because they were unaware of what the storyline would be. Emmerdale explained the storyline and said that they would be portraying the issue "positively and sensitively", so the Taskers agreed to Theo appearing. The role was taken over by Whittaker solely until May 2012 when Harvey Rogerson was cast as Whittaker's back-up. On 1 July 2014, Whittaker died, aged 3. A message honouring him appeared at the end of the episode broadcast on 10 July. After an extended break, Rogerson took over the role of Leo full-time.

Rhona goes into labour at The Woolpack after she is knocked over by Adam Barton (Adam Thomas) and Aaron Livesy (Danny Miller), who are fighting. She is taken to the hospital accompanied by Marlon, and she gives birth to a son in May 2011. After a discussion, Rhona and Marlon name their son Leo. Paddy comes to visit Leo and Rhona, followed by Aaron, Aaron's boyfriend Jackson Walsh (Marc Silcock), and Jackson's mother Hazel Rhodes (Pauline Quirke). In October 2011, Leo is christened, with Aaron and Laurel Thomas (Charlotte Bellamy) as his godparents.

== Jude Watson ==
Jude Watson
- Emmerdale character
- Portrayed by: Andy Wear
- Duration: 2011-2014
- First appearance: 23 June 2011
- Last appearance: 16 January 2014
- Introduced by: Steve Frost
In-universe information
- Occupation: Vicar

Jude Watson, played by Andy Wear, was a local vicar who first appeared for two episodes in June to conduct Ashley Thomas (John Middleton)'s vow renewal with Laurel Thomas (Charlotte Bellamy). Jude is a friend and colleague of Ashley, and when he resigned as the vicar of Emmerdale following a police caution, Jude took over the position.

Jude returns on 20 December 2011 as the new vicar of Emmerdale. For two years following his ascension as the local vicar, Jude appears until 16 January 2014, when he left the village to take up a post in Ripon. After his departure, his position was filled by Harriet Finch (Katherine Dow Blyton).

== Rachel Breckle ==
Rachel Breckle
- Emmerdale character
- Portrayed by: Gemma Oaten
- Duration: 2011–2015
- First appearance: 19 July 2011
- Last appearance: 26 August 2015
- Introduced by: Steve Frost
In-universe information
- Occupation: Cleaner; Factory worker
- Sisters: Ali Spencer
- Sons: Archie Breckle
- Nephews: Sean Spencer
- Nieces: Amelia Spencer

Rachel Breckle, played by Gemma Oaten, made her first on-screen appearance on 19 July 2011. The character and casting was announced on 3 June 2011. Of her casting, Oaten said "I'm thrilled to be joining Emmerdale. I've always watched the show and getting the part of Rachel is a dream come true. She is a fantastic character and I'm so excited about filming my first scenes." Series producer Stuart Blackburn said he was "delighted" to welcome Oaten to the cast. On 30 October 2013, it was announced Oaten had chosen to leave Emmerdale, with Rachel making her last appearance on 16 January 2014. Rachel returned on 20 January 2015 and departed again in August, the same year. In September 2019, producers took the decision to kill the character off screen to facilitate the reintroduction of her son.

Rachel is described as being "defensive, argumentative" and "feisty." She is insistent on defending her young niece Amelia (Daisy Campbell), who is accused of bullying Samson Dingle (Sam Hall). Blackburn said Rachel will "ruffle a few feathers with her straight-talking approach but beneath the surface she is fiercely loyal with a hidden heart of gold." Susan Hill of the Daily Star reported that Rachel would storm into the Dingles' house and accuse Samson of being a bully, shocking his father Sam (James Hooton). Sam tries to appease a furious Rachel and she eventually calms down and realises Sam is struggling with Samson. Hill said "She knows exactly what it's like and the pair have a lot more in common than they first think." Rachel and Sam decide to sort things out together and Sam explains that it has been a tough time for Samson and that he promises to talk to him about his behavior. In July 2011, Oaten revealed that members of Rachel's "extended family" would be introduced in the coming months. The actress said "There is a nephew that is coming in too, and there's going to be an extended family that I haven't heard too much about yet, so I'm really excited to see who I'm joined by in the coming months. It'll be great!" Oaten also explained that she would like to explore Rachel's lonely side and see it come out as the weeks go by. She also added Rachel has a "quite a quirky sense of humor." For her portrayal of Rachel, Oaten was nominated for Best Newcomer at the 2012 British Soap Awards. Rachel's return was named one of "the best bits of January" in the Inside Soap Yearbook 2016. Of Rachel's departure, Laura-Jayne Tyler of Inside Soap wrote, "Goodbye Rachel! We won't miss you, you mardy baggage."

After her niece, Amelia, tells her she is being bullied by Samson Dingle, Rachel confronts his father. However, Rachel is forced to apologise when she learns Amelia was actually the bully. Rachel and Sam then become friends. Rachel's nephew, Sean Spencer (Luke Roskell), finds her and admits stealing money from the garage and Aaron Livesy (Danny Miller) collapsed while chasing him. Rachel is angered when Aaron's mother, Chas Dingle (Lucy Pargeter), threatens Sean and tells him to stay away from Aaron.

Rachel gets a job in The Woolpack and works with Marlon Dingle (Mark Charnock) and develops feelings for him but he lets her down gently because of his feelings for Laurel Thomas (Charlotte Bellamy). Rachel tells Sam she is interested in Brook Cottage but Nicola King (Nicola Wheeler) tells Rachel she cannot rent it. Rachel shows her sister, Ali Spencer (Kelli Hollis), around the cottage and they rent the house. Rachel, Ali, Amelia, Sean and Ali's girlfriend, Ruby Haswell (Alicya Eyo), move into Brook Cottage. Rachel starts work as a cleaner at the Sharmas' sweet factory. She sees Jai Sharma (Chris Bisson) drinking after a row with his wife Charity (Emma Atkins) and he invites her to join him, which she does and this leads to them having a drunken one-night stand. A month or so later, Rachel learns that she is pregnant. Jai is initially shocked but warms to the idea. He stops her having an abortion and offers her a place to live in Leeds. Rachel thinks he is doing it for their child but realises that he wants her out of the way so his wife won't ask questions. She initially moves in but is lonely and returns to the village. In December 2012, Rachel goes into premature labour and has a son, Archie, supported by Ruby. Jai realises that he wants to be a proper father and is jealous of Sam spending time with Archie but Rachel is grateful and slaps Jai when he calls Sam stupid. She later realises she has feelings for Sam, dismaying Ali, Ruby and Lisa Dingle (Jane Cox), but Samson and Amelia are happy and sends a card to Rachel, pretending to be Sam, leading Rachel to admit her feelings. They get together and Rachel and Archie move in with Sam and Samson and are happy, even after it is revealed that Jai is Archie's father. The Dingles are not pleased and Charity asks Jai to choose: her or Archie. He initially chooses her and suggests that they leave the village and everyone in it behind but Charity refuses to leave her daughter, Debbie Dingle (Charley Webb) and granddaughter Sarah Sugden (Sophia Amber Moore). Jai realises that he cannot live in the same village as his son and not be part of his life. Angered by this, Charity and her son Noah Dingle (Jack Downham) move in with Debbie and Sarah before filing for divorce. When she catches Declan Macey (Jason Merrells) setting fire to Home Farm and intending to commit suicide, she tries to talk him out of it and he does change his mind. Seeing an opportunity to get rid of Rachel and Archie, she persuades Declan to help her frame Sam, thinking Sam, Rachel, Samson and Archie will go on the run but Rachel insists they stay and Sam clear his name legally so Charity blackmails her to tell the police that she set the fire and then go on the run.

Rachel returns as a prosecution witness at Charity's trial for fraud and reconciles with Sam. They move back in together but Rachel now has significant anger management issues and her arguments with Sam turn physical, especially after Jai starts residency proceedings. He is understandably scared of her and Archie leaving again but Rachel is horrified to learn that, in her absence, Jai bought a little boy that he thought was Archie. The child was revealed to be the son of the man who sold him to Jai when Rachel returned with the real Archie. Unfortunately for Jai, his plan to find out what is happening to Archie when he is with Rachel and Sam backfires when Rachel finds the camera and footage of him and his girlfriend, Leyla Harding (Roxy Shahidi), discussing their plans for a family life once he has residency and to divorce Megan Macey (Gaynor Faye). Sam and Rachel show the footage to Megan, who plans revenge and quietly starts helping Rachel whenever Jai tries to play tricks on her. Megan does her best including planting drugs in Jai's car, however unknown to Rachel, Megan discovers she is pregnant a few days before the hearing. Unable to forgive Jai for his infidelity, Megan leaves Jai and helps Rachel win Archie back successfully. Rachel, still stressed, keeps losing her temper and hitting Sam. When Ali discovers what Rachel has been doing to Sam, she demands that Rachel go with her to Liverpool and get treatment before she starts hitting Archie too. Rachel agrees and she and Sam part on good terms. Rachel is stunned to hear of Megan's pregnancy and she, Archie and Ali leave the village, heading for a better life. Rachel dies four years later and Dan Spencer (Liam Fox) brings Archie back to the village to live with Jai.

== Amelia Spencer ==
Amelia Spencer
- Emmerdale character
- Portrayed by: Daisy Campbell
- Duration: 2011–2024
- First appearance: Episode 5975; 19 July 2011
- Last appearance: Episode 10,169; 20 December 2024
- Introduced by: Steve Frost
- Crossover appearances: Coronation Street (2021)
In-universe information
- Father: Daz Spencer
- Mother: Ali Spencer
- Adoptive father: Dan Spencer
- Stepmother: Ruby Haswell
- Half-brothers: Sean Spencer
- Daughters: Esther Spencer
- Uncles: Dan Spencer
- Aunts: Rachel Breckle
- First cousins: Archie Breckle; Sean Spencer

Amelia Spencer, played by Daisy Campbell, made her first screen appearance on 19 July 2011 and her last screen appearance on 20 December 2024. The character and casting was announced on 3 June 2011. Amelia arrives at the Dingles' house with her aunt, Rachel (Gemma Oaten), after she accuses Sam Dingle's (James Hooton) young son, Samson (Sam Hall), of bullying her at school. Rachel makes Amelia say sorry to Samson when it turns out she was the one doing the bullying and is enrolled in the summer club run by Marlon Dingle (Mark Charnock) and Laurel Thomas (Charlotte Bellamy) and there, makes friends with the other children. Amelia's family; mother Ali (Kelli Hollis), Ali's girlfriend Ruby Haswell (Alicya Eyo) and her older brother Sean (Luke Roskell) move into Brook Cottage. Amelia gets fed up of Sean arguing with Ruby and runs away, straight into the path of Carl King's (Tom Lister) van. However, she is pulled out of the way in time by Sam. Amelia is happy when her father, Dan (Liam Fox), turns up in the village to see her and Sean.

Amelia decides she wants to believe in God and announces to her mum that she wants to be christened. A few days before her christening day, Amelia changes her mind because two girls at the summer club are bullying her over her mother being a lesbian, which Sean finds amusing. After Ali talks to her, the christening goes ahead as planned. Amelia is a bridesmaid at her father's wedding to Chas Dingle (Lucy Pargeter). When Chas is later arrested for the murder of Carl, Amelia makes a dummy of her and attempts to throw it on the bonfire. Amelia auditions for the part of Mary in the Nativity play at the church. She begs the vicar for the part and on purpose sings louder than the other children. Amelia later meets her baby cousin Archie after Rachel goes into premature labour. Amelia was also a bridesmaid for her father, Dan, and Kerry Wyatt's (Laura Norton) wedding. However, it was later discovered that Kerry was already married but she did not think it was valid since it was in Las Vegas.

In April 2018, Amelia learns that her mum Ali had died following a car crash in Liverpool, hearing the news from her uncle Daz (Mark Jordon). Later, Daz drunkenly admits to Kerry that he had a one-night stand with Ali twelve years previously, and Amelia could be his daughter, which was confirmed by a DNA test to be true, whilst Dan and Amelia go to Liverpool to attend Ali's funeral. Amelia later accidentally learns the news that Daz is her biological father and after trying to stop Dan and Daz fighting, she goes missing. Amelia is later found to have been living with Beth, the daughter of a soldier that Daz accidentally shot dead during a firearms handling exercise whilst they were both serving in the army in Afghanistan in 2009. Beth wants revenge on Daz, and contacted Amelia via an online chatroom, befriending her, and turning her against her family in person, as well as framing Daz for kidnapping. When Bernice Blackstock (Samantha Giles) lured Beth to the cricket pavilion and had her arrested on kidnapping, attempted extortion and perverting the course of justice, Amelia protests that Daz should be imprisoned. Amelia is reunited with her family at this point, who assure her that they all love her no matter what. Amelia still tries to contact Beth, through such means as stealing Harriet Finch's (Katherine Dow Blyton) mobile.

=== Departure ===
On 29 October 2024, it was announced that Amelia had been axed from the soap and she will depart Emmerdale by Christmas after spending her time in the soap opera since when she was just eight years old. Campbell described that the decision left her "grieving." She told The Mirror: "It wasn’t my choice to leave Emmerdale and it was a shock at first. Being in Emmerdale is all I have ever known. I’ve spent the whole of my childhood growing up in the soap and it felt daunting." She continued: "Once they explained, I totally got it. Amelia isn’t part of the Dingles, her dad has left, Samson has gone now and she doesn’t have any family. There is nowhere to take Amelia and I understand that. I feel incredibly lucky to have been in the soap for 13 years and to have been handed so many opportunities at such a young age."

Campbell also revealed that she was told of the news in May 2024, but only felt ready to announce her departure in October after she had time to "grieve." The only other cast members she told about her future on the soap were Katie Hill who plays Sarah Sugden, Jack Downham who plays Noah Dingle, and Rosie Bentham who plays Gabby Thomas. She said: "They were upset for me but so supportive. I didn’t tell the rest of the cast my news initially as I wanted the time to process everything. I needed time to grieve the part of Amelia. I had worried so much about how I was going to tell people I was going and now I know I shouldn’t have! They were all brilliant." She continued: "Obviously it was a shock at first but now I have had time to digest it all, I am really excited. Emmerdale has actually done me a favour because I would never have left if they hadn’t decided there was no longer anywhere to take Amelia. I am glad it was their choice and not mine. I see it as a big positive now because it is such a great chance to push myself, start a new chapter away from Emmerdale and take on hopefully some new parts. I am really excited about what lies ahead. How she leaves is being kept a closely guarded secret, but the Mirror can reveal she won’t be killed off. “I am pleased the door is being left open. But I can’t say too much about how she leaves."

Before her departure was announced, Amelia had begun a relationship with Tom King (James Chase), who had been abusing his wife Belle (Eden Taylor-Draper). She teased that her departure may have something to do with Tom. Amelia saw a different side of Tom at the bonfire night, airing 5 November 2024. She commented: "He gets annoyed with Amelia and it’s a turning point for her. Could Amelia be the second Belle in terms of Tom’s nastiness? Everyone will have to wait to see." Praising the soap for tackling the issue, Daisy added: "It is great the soap is raising awareness about how women need to be believed. It’s been nice for me to get my teeth into such an important story."

Regarding her departure, Campbell revealed that her mother had a feeling that she would be axed. She said: "My mum actually had a gut instinct that this might happen anyway,” says Daisy. “But they have been brilliant and told me to enjoy seeing where my career takes me next. I am very lucky as I do live at home, so I don’t have to worry about rent. I am a free bird!" Reflecting on her 13 years in Emmerdale, Daisy says she enjoyed every minute of it and doesn't regret joining at a young age: "I will be forever grateful for my whole time spent in Emmerdale. It’s been amazing to learn from people who have been in the industry for years and I will take all their advice with me. I have made so many friends on set and I am going to miss everyone. But I feel lucky to have grown up on the soap. I have never felt I have missed out at all."

On 5 December 2024, it was announced that Mark Jordon would reprise the role of Daz as part of Amelia's exit storyline, where she would go and live with him in Leicester, taking Esther with her. Campbell spoke to Digital Spy about Jordon's return: "It was emotional to film the final episodes. It was weird, because we film in two-week blocks. So, the first week was really emotional, because Mark Jordon, who plays Daz, comes back. It was lovely to see him again. Then on the second week, I think I was used to it. I was really dreading my last block, because I hate crying in front of people unless it's for a scene. But my last week just felt fine. I didn't really cry that much. I was actually proud of myself. I was like: 'Oh, I've not got teary scenes this week'. But it was emotional, really emotional." So, that was really emotional, and whenever I work with Laura Norton, who plays Kerry, she's so good at doing emotions. The way she cries, I cry!" She added: "Amelia ends up going to live back with Daz in Leicester. We had a scene where I had to say: 'I'm off to move to Leicester with Esther!' So she ends up moving back with Daz, which is nice. He comes back for one episode, which is lovely."

== Sean Spencer ==
Sean Spencer
- Emmerdale character
- Portrayed by: Luke Roskell
- Duration: 2011–2014
- First appearance: 10 August 2011
- Last appearance: 5 December 2014
- Introduced by: Steve Frost
In-universe information
- Occupation: Student; Soldier
- Father: Dan Spencer
- Mother: Ali Spencer
- Stepmother: Chas Dingle; Ruby Haswell
- Half-sisters: Amelia Spencer
- Uncles: Daz Spencer
- Aunts: Karen Spencer; Rachel Breckle
- First cousins: Archie Breckle; Amelia Spencer

Sean Spencer, played by Luke Roskell, made his first on screen appearance on 10 August 2011. Roskell's casting was announced in June 2011. Sean is Ali Spencer's (Kelli Hollis) son and Amelia's (Daisy Campbell) older brother. Much to his horror, Sean's mother left his father for Ruby Haswell (Alicya Eyo). Sean is not happy that his mother has come out as a lesbian and she is no longer with his father. Sean enjoys winding Ruby up. Sean has been described as a "tearaway." The official Emmerdale website said Sean is typical teenager, full of attitude and hates being told what to do. He is "potentially trouble." Ali constantly worries about Sean and hopes village life will calm him down.

On 21 July 2014, it was confirmed that Roskell had left Emmerdale after three years. The actor had already filmed his final scenes. Of his decision to leave, Roskell said "I have had an amazing three years on Emmerdale and I will miss everyone loads. I wanted to explore other opportunities and I am excited to find out what the future holds." However, Roskell made one more appearance in December 2014, for his mum's wedding to her partner, after leaving months earlier.

Sean develops on-off relationships with Belle Dingle (Eden Taylor-Draper) and Gemma Andrews (Tendai Rinomhota). On numerous occasions, this is considered a love triangle, with Sean being confused over who he loves. Gemma becomes pregnant with his baby and Belle is distraught, revealing to everybody at school that she is pregnant with Sean's child. Gemma's father Dom is angry at Sean for impregnating her. Sean is distraught when Belle inadvertently kills Gemma by pushing her, causing her to hit her head on a rock. Belle is convinced that she is a murderer and, with the help of her father, hands herself in to the police. Sean and Belle decide to try to get pregnant to reduce her prison sentence, on the advice of Kerry Wyatt (Laura Norton), but they later forget this plan. Sean admits that he is in love with Belle but she is sentenced to three years imprisonment, devastating Sean. Sean makes the decision to join the army to be like his uncle, Daz (Mark Jordon), who moves into the village. Even after his uncle leaves the village he is still determined to join the army. His dad, Dan, agrees to sign the forms but his mum is against it. Sean returns to Emmerdale on 5 December 2014 for Ali and Ruby's wedding.

In April 2015, Dan and Ali drive to Liverpool after discovering that Sean has been involved in a car accident with his friends. When they arrive back home, it is implied that Sean's injuries sustained during the crash are serious.

In April 2018, Sean contacts Daz and informs him Ali has been killed in a car accident.

== Ali Spencer ==
Ali Spencer
- Emmerdale character
- Portrayed by: Kelli Hollis
- Duration: 2011–2015
- First appearance: 17 October 2011
- Last appearance: 26 August 2015
- Introduced by: Steve Frost
In-universe information
- Occupation: Packer (2011–2014); Factory Supervisor (2014–2015)
- Sisters: Rachel Breckle
- Husband: Dan Spencer (1994–2012)
- Wife: Ruby Haswell (2014–2015)
- Sons: Sean Spencer
- Daughters: Amelia Spencer
- Granddaughters: Esther Spencer
- Grandfathers: Fred Breckle
- Nephews: Archie Breckle
- Other relatives: Daz Spencer (brother-in law, 1994–2012)

Alison "Ali" Spencer, played by Kelli Hollis, made her first on screen appearance on 17 October 2011. The character and casting was announced on 28 July 2011. Of joining the cast of Emmerdale, Hollis said "As a Leeds girl myself, getting a role as a new regular character for Emmerdale in my home town is a dream come true. I'm really excited to be playing Ali." Hollis told Daniel Kilkelly of Digital Spy that she received a phone call about the part of Ali. She went on to explain "Alicya and I had different partners in the screen test and I was so sure she would get the part and because she had a different partner, I thought that was it for me. But when I got it, I was just over the moon. I'm from Leeds and live just ten minutes from the studio and Emmerdale is just an institution, so to get a job here is just amazing."

Ali is Rachel Breckle's (Gemma Oaten) sister. She is the mother of Amelia (Daisy Campbell) and Sean Spencer (Luke Roskell). Ali leaves her husband, Dan (Liam Fox), and flat on the Hotten estate for a new start in the village with her children and her girlfriend, Ruby Haswell (Alicya Eyo). Of Ali, a show statement said "Ali is determined to make her new life in Emmerdale with Ruby work, regardless of Sean's reaction and the pleas of her determined ex-husband to give their marriage another go. When faced with the reality of Ali's baggage, does Ruby really feel the same?" Series producer Stuart Blackburn said Ali and Ruby are both down to earth, funny and likeable women. Hollis described Ali as "feisty" and said she would do anything for her children. While she does not have any issues about leaving her husband of fifteen years for a woman, Ali is dealing with how her choice is affecting the family. Hollis said "She just wants to find a way for them all to get on together, including with her sister Rachel. For Ali, everything is about keeping the family together at the moment." Of Ali's relationship with Ruby, Hollis said her character never planned to become a lesbian, but then she met Ruby and fell in love with her. Ali is fully committed to Ruby and did not take the decision to leave her husband lightly.

Ali first comes to the village when her sister, Rachel, tells her about a cottage for rent in the village. Ali comes to view it and tells Rachel that she really likes it, so they visit Declan Macey (Jason Merrells) and ask if she can rent the cottage. Former occupant, Nicola King (Nicola Wheeler) overhears and isn't happy when Declan agrees. Ali soon returns to the village with Rachel and her children, Amelia and Sean, to move in but Sean is unhappy when Ali's girlfriend, Ruby Haswell (Alicya Eyo), joins them. While Ali and Ruby are moving their stuff, Sean and Ruby argue about how much life would be better without her around and consequently no one notices Amelia disappearing and is nearly run over by Carl King (Tom Lister). Luckily Cameron Murray (Dominic Power), catches Amelia before she is harmed. Amelia's family run to her and Ali thanks Cameron for saving Amelia and punches Carl for not looking where he is going. However, Ali later learns that Cameron caused the accident, wanting revenge on Carl, so Ali makes them move furniture into Brook Cottage and both men are surprised to discover that Ali and Ruby are lesbians.

Ali gets a job at the Sharma and Sharma sweet factory and befriends Lisa Dingle (Jane Cox). When Lisa learns her daughter, Belle (Eden Taylor-Draper), is seeing Sean, she asks Ali to keep him away. Ali struggles to pay the rent and asks Nicola for an extension, which is refused. Ali and Ruby begin drifting apart and things worsen when Ruby suggests moving back to Hotten. Ruby eventually admits having some savings that she planned to use to move away but Ali accuses her of trying to run away but Ruby insists she wants to stay with Ali and her family and asks Ali to divorce Dan but she makes excuses not to. When Sean asks Ali to read his school project, she reveals that she cannot read or write, admitting that she rarely went to school and the teachers didn't help. Ali is asked to cover for Lisa when she has to collect Samson from school because he is ill and accidentally sends a customer the wrong order. Initially, she blames Lisa but when Lisa is suspended, Ali admits to Jai (Chris Bisson) and Nikhil Sharma (Rik Makarem) that she cannot read. They insist she attends an adult literacy course if she wants to keep her job and all goes well until Ali notices another child wearing Sean's trainers and demands he return them. When he refuses, she knocks him over and is removing them herself but is stopped by the staff. The child's parents decline to press charges but the staff ban Ali from the school grounds, so Ruby takes over as Ali's teacher.

In summer 2012, she discovers that Rachel is pregnant and is unsure what to do next. Ali supports her but is frustrated by Rachel's refusal to name the father of her child and when village gossip accuses David Metcalfe, she attacks him in the Woolpack. Rachel, however, is horrified and demands Ali apologise to him in the Woolpack and accept that Rachel will handle the situation her way or she will leave. Ali accepts it reluctantly and is pleased when Rachel moves into Tenant's Cottage in the village. She, Ruby and the children live quietly for a while until Declan's sister, Megan Macey (Gaynor Faye), takes a shine to the cottage and gives them notice to quit as she plans to live there with her son, Robbie Lawson (Jamie Shelton). When Declan learns of this, he is not pleased and tells Megan to withdraw the notice to quit but she and Zak Dingle go to measure up. Ali visits Declan and tells him what has happened and they return to the cottage, just in time to see Rachel punch Megan in the face. Megan threatens to call the police unless Ali and her family vacate the cottage within 24 hours, which they do and move in with Rachel.

In April 2015, Dan and Ali drive to Liverpool after discovering that Sean has been involved in a car accident with his friends. When they arrive back home, it is implied that Sean's injuries sustained during the crash are serious and Ali decides to stay in Liverpool until he recovers and Ruby stays in the village to ensure a steady income for the family. In August 2015, Ali returns to the village after Ruby is killed in the helicopter crash at Pete and Debbie's wedding. After Ruby's funeral, Ali discovers Rachel has been physically abusing her partner Sam. Ali asks Rachel to move to Liverpool with her as she can no longer stay in the village because of the memories of Ruby and so that Rachel can get help for her anger issues, both sisters leave Emmerdale on 26 August 2015.

In April 2018, Ali's former brother-in-law Daz Spencer (Mark Jordon) receives a call from Sean telling him that Ali has been killed in a car accident. Daz breaks the news to a devastated Amelia. Daz later confesses to Kerry Wyatt (Laura Norton) that he had a one-night stand with Ali during her marriage to Dan and thinks he may be Amelia's father. Dan finds out and is furious with Daz. A DNA test is taken and Daz is confirmed to be Amelia's father.

== Ruby Haswell ==
Ruby Haswell
- Emmerdale character
- Portrayed by: Alicya Eyo
- Duration: 2011–2015
- First appearance: 20 October 2011
- Last appearance: 5 August 2015
- Introduced by: Steve Frost
In-universe information
- Occupation: Carer; Café Waitress
- Mother: Lindy
- Wife: Ali Spencer (2014–2015)
- Stepsons: Sean Spencer
- Stepdaughters: Amelia Spencer

Ruby Haswell, played by Alicya Eyo, made her first on screen appearance on 20 October 2011. The character and casting was announced on 28 July 2011. Of joining Emmerdale, Eyo said "I'm over the moon and can't wait to get started. Being part of a show that I've grown up watching is amazing and Ruby is going to be a lot of fun to play." Ruby is in a relationship with Ali Spencer (Kelli Hollis) and they move into the village with Ali's children. Both Ali and Ruby were tipped to cause a stir with their "no-nonsense attitudes." Series producer, Stuart Blackburn described Ali and Ruby as "down to earth, gritty, funny and likeable."

Eyo told Inside Soap Ruby is really comfortable with herself and her sexuality. She does not feel she has anything to prove. No one in the village is aware Ali is a lesbian, until Brenda Walker (Lesley Dunlop) and Nicola King (Nicola Wheeler) see her and Ruby kissing. Because she is not happy that Ali and Ruby moved in Brook Cottage, Nicola announces they are together in The Woolpack. Of this, Eyo said "I don't think Ruby and Ali are expecting their new life in Emmerdale to be plain sailing by any means. But these women are really dedicated to each other, so I think they can sort anything out between them if they're on the receiving end of any hassle." Eyo added Ruby is already used to gossip and she can handle herself, but if people have a go at Ali or her children, then she will not stand for it.

Ruby arrives in the village to join her partner, Ali, and her two children, Sean (Luke Roskell) and Amelia (Daisy Campbell). Sean is not happy to learn Ruby is moving in too and while he, Ali and Ruby are arguing, Amelia wanders off and is nearly run over by Carl King (Tom Lister). Sam Dingle (James Hooton) pulls Amelia to safety and Ruby realises she has injured her shoulder. She takes everyone to the hospital. When Carl and Cameron Murray (Dominic Power) help move Ali and Ruby's furniture, they are shocked to find out Ali and Ruby are lesbians. Ali and Ruby get married in December 2014.

Ruby is killed when she sustains as serious when a helicopter careers off its path and crashed into the wedding reception of Pete Barton (Anthony Quinlan) and Debbie Dingle (Charley Webb) held at the village hall, as a result of a gas explosion, caused by Chrissie White (Louise Marwood). A devastated Dan Spencer (Liam Fox) and Kerry Wyatt (Laura Norton) are by Ruby's side. Her funeral is held on 25 August 2015, and she is cremated.

== Georgia Sharma ==
Georgia Sharma
- Emmerdale character
- Portrayed by: Trudie Goodwin (2011–2015); Lin Blakley (2023)
- Duration: 2011–2015, 2023
- First appearance: 3 November 2011
- Last appearance: 31 July 2023
- Introduced by: Steve Frost (2011); Kate Brooks (2023)
In-universe information
- Husband: Rishi Sharma (until 2012)
- Sons: Nikhil Sharma; Jai Sharma
- Daughters: Priya Sharma
- Grandsons: Archie Breckle
- Granddaughters: Mia Macey; Molly Sharma; Amba Metcalfe; Eliza Sharma

Georgia Sharma, played by Trudie Goodwin, made her first on screen appearance on 3 November 2011. The character and casting was announced on 7 September 2011. Georgia is Nikhil (Rik Makarem), Jai (Chris Bisson) and Priya Sharma's (Fiona Wade) mother. She and her husband, Rishi (Bhasker Patel) arrive in the village to meet Jai's fiancée, Charity Tate (Emma Atkins). Georgia is described as being "formidable, demanding and yet witty." Of her casting, Goodwin said "I'm absolutely thrilled to be playing Georgia in Emmerdale. She is a difficult-to-please woman who is set to make life difficult for Charity. I can't wait to start filming next week." On 28 June 2023, it was announced that Georgia would return with Lin Blakley taking over the role from Goodwin.

Rishi and Georgia's marriage falls apart and she begins a relationship with Rodney Blackstock (Patrick Mower). Georgia stays in the village, supporting Priya through her anorexia nervosa and disapproves of her proposed arranged marriage. Rodney and Georgia's relationship ends, after they have different ambitions over their future. Georgia considers a reconciliation with Rishi, but decides to leave the village for a cruise instead. When Georgia returned in July 2023 for Jai's wedding to Laurel Thomas (Charlotte Bellamy), it had recently been revealed that Rishi had actually adopted Jai and raised him as his own son which had caused a feud between him and Jai. Georgia revealed that Jai's biological father was in fact Rishi's brother Amit Sharma (Anil Goutam), whom she had a fling with in late 1974. Georgia then departed on 31 July after Rishi died falling down the stairs of his home, unbeknownst to everyone at the time he was in fact pushed by Amit, who then hadn't yet appeared on-screen.

== Rishi Sharma ==
Rishi Sharma
- Emmerdale character
- Portrayed by: Bhasker Patel
- Duration: 2011–2023
- First appearance: Episode 6069; 3 November 2011
- Last appearance: Episode 9742; 28 July 2023
- Introduced by: Steve Frost
In-universe information
- Occupation: Businessman
- Brothers: Amit Sharma
- Wife: Georgia Sharma (until 2012); Manpreet Jutla (2019–2022)
- Sons: Nikhil Sharma
- Daughters: Priya Sharma
- Adoptive sons: Jai Sharma
- Stepdaughters: Aiesha Richards
- Grandsons: Archie Breckle
- Granddaughters: Mia Macey; Molly Sharma; Amba Metcalfe; Eliza Sharma
- Nephews: Jai Sharma; Suni Sharma

Rishi Sharma, played by Bhasker Patel, made his first on screen appearance on 3 November 2011. The character and casting was announced on 7 September 2011. Rishi is married to Georgia (Trudie Goodwin) and is father to Nikhil (Rik Makarem), Jai (Chris Bisson) and Priya Sharma (Fiona Wade). He and his wife arrive in the village to meet Jai's fiancée, Charity Tate (Emma Atkins). Rishi is described as being "business-obsessed." Of the Sharmas' casting, Stuart Blackburn said "I'm delighted to welcome Trudie, Bhasker and Fiona to the cast. There are plenty of trials and tribulations in store for the ever popular Sharma family." The character was killed off in an unannounced departure on 27 July 2023 where he was discovered dead at his home.

Rishi meets his future daughter-in-law Charity and approves of her. He spends a few weeks with Jai and becomes critical about the factory. He attends Jai and Charity's wedding with his wife Georgia. Rishi and Georgia return to see their granddaughter, Molly. Rishi and Georgia's marriage dissolves and Rishi moves in with Jai. When Jai gets Rachel Breckle (Gemma Oaten) pregnant and she gives birth to his son, Archie, Rishi saves Jai's marriage with Charity by saying that the baby is his. But a year later, when Rishi suffers a heart attack, he reveals to Charity that Archie is Jai's.

In May 2014, Priya gives birth to Rishi's third grandchild, Amba, who was born seven weeks premature. Rishi learns that Jai was threatening Rachel during his custody battle and becomes ashamed of his actions. He helps Kirin and Belle launch their cordial and plans for the launch party. While there, he tells Jai to go home after he knocks over Vanessa, while under the influence of drugs. With Priya's help, he tries to help save the business, as many clients were turned off due to Jai's actions. Jai is then taken to hospital and Rishi is accused of sexism when he does not think Priya is capable of running the business, instead employing Nikhil. He helps Jai get over his addiction to cocaine.

In March 2016, Rishi has a fourth grandchild when Megan Macey (Gaynor Faye) gives birth to Jai's daughter Eliza.

In March 2018, Rishi walks in on Priya as she snaps at Amba and Eliza, much to the distress of the former. On the following day, Rishi attends Eliza's 2nd birthday party and is present when Jai finds bruises on her legs, proceeding to take her to hospital. When initial tests prove inconclusive, Rishi greatly offends Priya when he privately suggests that she may have inflicted them. Priya does, however, reveal her prior outburst to Jai and Megan, becoming under suspicion of child abuse. Priya's innocence is ultimately proved when Eliza's bruises are determined to be the result of epilepsy medication.

In 2023, it is revealed that Rishi is not Jai's father, but it is instead his brother, Amit. It leads to the pair falling out on numerous occasions. As he heads to Jai's wedding to support him regardless of their issues, the character is killed off in a previously unannounced departure when he falls down a stairs. In a goodbye video for Emmerdale's social media channels, Patel said that he would miss filming in the village as he found Emmerdale's filming location beautiful. Bisson, who portrays Jai, hoped that the audience would take something from Rishi's death, since the pair were in an argument prior to his death. He said: "Maybe resolve a difference that they have, before it's too late. It would be nice to think the show could have a positive effect. Life really is too short." Bisson added that the set felt weird without him, due to having been his co-star for 12 years.

== Dan Spencer ==
Dan Spencer
- Emmerdale character
- Portrayed by: Liam Fox
- Duration: 2011–2023
- First appearance: Episode 6074; 9 November 2011
- Last appearance: Episode 9758/9759; 17 August 2023
- Introduced by: Steve Frost
In-universe information
- Occupation: Labourer; Packer; Mechanic; Trainee Paramedic
- Brothers: Daz Spencer
- Sisters: Karen Spencer
- Wife: Ali Spencer (1994–2012); Chas Dingle (2012–2013)
- Sons: Sean Spencer
- Adoptive daughters: Amelia Spencer
- Granddaughters: Esther Spencer (adoptive)
- Aunts: Jackie

Dan Spencer, played by Liam Fox, made his first on screen appearance on 9 November 2011. The character and casting was announced on 11 October 2011. Fox was initially contracted to appear in eight episodes and he began filming his first scenes in September. Dan is the father of Amelia (Daisy Campbell) and Sean Spencer (Luke Roskell). He is Ali Spencer's (Kelli Hollis) estranged husband and he arrives in the village hoping to make life difficult for Ali and her new girlfriend, Ruby (Alicya Eyo). The Daily Mirror's Tony Stewart branded the character "Desperate Dan" and said he believes "he's God's gift to women". On Digital Spy's 2012 end of year reader poll, Chas and Cameron's affair and the subsequent effect on Dan was voted fourth in the "Best Storyline" category, receiving 8.9% of the vote.

Dan comes to Emmerdale to see his children. Ali and her partner, Ruby, are not pleased by his presence, but Amelia and Sean enjoy having their father visit. Dan decides to stay around for a while and he believes he can win Ali back. After a couple of weeks, Dan announced he is leaving to return to work. Sean asks to go with him, but Dan tells him he has no flat yet. Dan returns to the village a few months later, still refusing to give up on his marriage, even though Ali wants a divorce. He moves in with Bob Hope (Tony Audenshaw) and gets a packing job at the Sharma and Sharma sweet factory. Sean tells him to leave Ali and Ruby alone and that he likes living with them. Dan takes Amelia and Sean to his house after Sean claims that Ruby kissed him. Dan allows the children to return home when Sean confesses to lying about the kiss. When Ali and Ruby fall out, Dan helps them repair their relationship. Dan develops feelings for Chas Dingle (Lucy Pargeter) and she reciprocates. After dating for a few weeks, Chas proposes to Dan, but he turns her down. He later changes his mind and proposes to her instead. Chas accepts and they begin planning their wedding. Dan and Chas get married but it doesn't work out as he finds out about her affair with Debbie's boyfriend, Cameron Murray (Dominic Power). Dan later befriends Kerry Wyatt (Laura Norton) after her split with Andy Sugden (Kelvin Fletcher). They later begin a relationship after Dan develops feelings for Kerry. During this time Dan offers to be a donor for his ex-wife, Ali and her girlfriend, Ruby in order to allow them to have a child together. Dan also supports Brenda Walker (Lesley Dunlop) after discovering she has cancer. Dan and Kerry also support Brenda in the wake of her stealing and her brief split from husband, Bob and through the death of her daughter Gennie Walker (Sian Reese-Williams). After, over a year dating, Kerry wants Dan to commit to their relationship after being teased by Nicola King (Nicola Wheeler). Dan proposes to Kerry but it is clear his heart isn't really in it. Months later, Dan does a charity skydive for Val Pollard (Charlie Hardwick), who has HIV and while doing so proposes to Kerry. She accepts and they plan their wedding. On their wedding day Dan isn't sure whether to go through with the wedding as he walked in on his brother Daz kissing Kerry. Dan considers jilting Kerry but they eventually go through with it. At the wedding reception, a man called Kev Berry (Christopher Connell), turns up claiming to be Kerry's husband. It transpires that Kerry got married while on holiday and never got a divorce. Dan along with Kerry, Daz, and Kev are all arrested. While at the police station, it is discovered that Daz already has a criminal record and deliberately broke into David Metcalfe's shop in order to sell dodgy alarms. Dan later dumps Kerry. In the wake of their split, Kerry goes to Alicante leaving Dan secretly devastated. A few weeks later, Kerry returns just as Dan's son, Sean is about to leave for the army. At Sean's leaving party Dan has a one-night stand with his ex-wife, Ali. Dan and Ali later agree to keep it a secret but it becomes too much for Dan, so he ends up telling Kerry the truth. In the wake of this, he and Kerry get back together, creating tension between Kerry and Ali. A few weeks later, Ruby finds out that Dan and Ali had known the truth about a fire at Home Farm allegedly set slight by Ali's sister Rachel Breckle (Gemma Oaten) and the circumstances surrounding her departure. A few weeks after this, Ruby finds out about Dan and Ali's one-night stand causing the breakdown of Ali and Ruby's relationship.

On 5 August 2015, Dan attends the wedding of Debbie Dingle (Charley Webb) and Pete Barton (Anthony Quinlan), Dan goes outside for some fresh air, when he looks up to the sky, he sees a helicopter about to crash into the wedding reception, he then runs inside to warn everyone. During the aftermath of the crash, he and Kerry find Ruby, who has been crushed and is severely bleeding, as the building slowly crumbles around them, Dan and Kerry stay by Ruby's side as she dies.

In August 2023, Fox confirmed to Metro that his character had been written out of the soap in a storyline that sees Dan go to prison.

== Kyle Dingle ==
Kyle Dingle
- Emmerdale character
- Portrayed by: Molly and Isaac Ainsworth (2011); Huey Quinn (2013–present)
- Duration: 2011, 2013, 2015–present
- First appearance: 1 December 2011
- Introduced by: Steve Frost
In-universe information
- Other names: Kyle Wyatt; Kyle Winchester
- Father: Cain Dingle
- Mother: Amy Wyatt
- Adoptive father: Tom Winchester
- Adoptive mother: Karen Winchester; Moira Dingle
- Stepfather: Matty Barton
- Half-brothers: Nate Robinson; Isaac Dingle; Adam Barton (adoptive); Matty Barton (adoptive)
- Half-sisters: Debbie Dingle; Holly Barton (adoptive)
- Grandfathers: Zak Dingle
- Grandmothers: Faith Dingle; Kerry Wyatt; Joanie Wright (adoptive)
- Uncles: Butch Dingle; Ben Dingle; Caleb Miligan; Sam Dingle; Mackenzie Boyd (adoptive)
- Aunts: Chas Dingle; Belle Dingle; Chloe Harris
- Nephews: Jack Sugden
- Nieces: Sarah Sugden; Frankie Robinson
- First cousins: Aaron Dingle; Nicky Miligan; Vinny Dingle; Samson Dingle; Eve Dingle; Reuben Harris
- Other relatives: Charity Dingle; Mandy Dingle; Marlon Dingle; Noah Dingle; Moses Dingle; April Windsor; Leo Goskirk; Leyla Sugden

Kyle Dingle (previously Wyatt and Winchester) made his first on screen appearance on 1 December 2011. He is the son of Amy Wyatt (Chelsea Halfpenny/Natalie Ann Jamieson) and Cain Dingle (Jeff Hordley). Amy discovered she was pregnant following a one-night stand with Cain. When asked if Amy is shocked that she is pregnant, Halfpenny told What's on TV "Yes. She didn't ever imagine it would happen – especially not from just a one-night stand. And it couldn't have come at a worse time because she's fallen out with Val and Eric." Halfpenny explained Amy is scared by Cain's angry reaction to the news, as she thought he would be more sympathetic. Cain convinces Amy to have an abortion, but after seeing an ultrasound scan of the baby, Amy realises she wants to keep it. Of this, Halfpenny said "Because Amy hasn't had love in her life she doesn't want to do that to anybody else." Amy manages to keep her pregnancy a secret and she plans to give birth away from the village, but she goes into labour unexpectedly and gives birth in the local cemetery. Halfpenny filmed the labour scenes during four night shoots and she called them daunting as she wanted them to look realistic.

Amy gives birth to a boy, but panics when he does not appear to be alive, she wraps him up and places him in a phone box. Hazel Rhodes (Pauline Quirke) finds the baby boy, who is alive, and calls an ambulance. Of Amy's reaction to this, Halfpenny said "She's still panicking, but the fact that he is alive is a massive relief to her. It's a big weight off her shoulders, because she never intended to harm the child at all - she's always wanted to give her baby to someone who would look after him properly." Amy plans to have the baby adopted and her foster parents, Val (Charlie Hardwick) and Eric Pollard (Chris Chittell), have different reactions to the announcement. Halfpenny told Daniel Kilkelly of Digital Spy that Eric wants whatever Amy wants, but Val wants to keep the baby so she can give him what she did not give her own children. Halfpenny added "So Val is a lot more maternal when it comes to Kyle and wants Amy to keep him, while I think Pollard is happy with whatever Amy wants to do." Kyle returned on 12 August 2013, now played by Huey Quinn, following the death of his adoptive parents.

Following a one-night stand with Cain, Amy discovers she is pregnant with his child in June 2011. She tells Cain, who pays her to have an abortion. Amy goes to the clinic with her friend, Victoria Sugden (Isabel Hodgins), but she cannot go through with the abortion. Amy later changes her mind, but she is told her pregnancy is too far along to have the procedure. Amy keeps her pregnancy a secret from everyone, except Cain's younger half-sister Belle Dingle (Eden Taylor-Draper). In December 2011, Amy goes into labour and gives birth in the local cemetery, she believes her son is dead and she wraps him up and places him in a phonebox. The baby is found by Hazel and taken to the hospital. He remains in hospital, while he recovers and he is frequently visited by Eric and Val. The baby is named Kyle and Amy decides to bring him home on Christmas Day 2011, pleasing Val. After she loses concentration while bathing Kyle, Amy calls social services and asks them to take him. Val pleads with Amy not to give Kyle away, but Amy does not change her mind and Kyle is taken to a foster family. Amy later has Kyle adopted, much to Val's disappointment.

In August 2013, Kyle's adoptive parents Karen and Tom die. Amy attends their funeral and wake in the hope of seeing Kyle. Kyle is brought to the wake by his adoptive grandmother Joanie Wright (Denise Black). In 2015, Kyle and Joanie move to Emmerdale permanently, and although Cain is reluctant to be involved with him, he eventually bonds with his son. Cain's wife Moira Dingle (Natalie J. Robb) also becomes a mother figure to Kyle. In January 2017, Joanie dies from a heart attack after being released from prison and Cain later broke the news to Kyle. In October 2017, Kyle became an older half-brother when his younger half-brother Isaac Dingle is born to Cain and Moira. Then, in 2019, Amy returned to the village and got to know Kyle. Kyle lived with his father Cain and cousin Aaron Dingle (Danny Miller) after Moira had an affair with his half-brother Nate Robinson (Jurell Carter). He is now back at the farm with Cain, Moira and Isaac following their reconciliation.

When Kyle finds Cain fighting with Al Chapman (Michael Wildman) in the barn in October 2022, he picks up Moira's gun and tries to ward Al off. Al jumps at Kyle and the gun goes off, resulting in Al's death. The police are called and Cain covers for Kyle, choosing to go to prison himself. Kyle struggles with his guilt and eventually he admits to Amy that he killed Al. Although Amy, Moira and the family try to prevent Kyle from doing so, he eventually tells the police that he killed Al. Kyle is sent to a secure home for a while but is released, and he reunites with Cain when he himself is freed from prison. Eventually, after the interventions of Cain's brother Caleb Miligan, the charges against Kyle are dropped. In February 2025, Kyle is left devastated when Amy dies in a limousine accident.

== Other characters ==
Date(s)	Character	Actor	Circumstances
19 January–24 June	Joe Chappell	Scott Taylor	Joe is Jackson Walsh's (Marc Silcock) carer. Joe takes care of Jackson at home and accompanies him when he is out and about. Joe reveals that he has an overbearing mother. Joe is dismissed by Hazel so she could help care for Jackson in the run up to ending his life, and he later attends Jackson's funeral and helps carry the coffin.
1–15 February	Stephanie Ray	Elianne Byrne	Stephanie is a midwife and an old friend of Rhona Goskirk (Zoë Henry). Stephanie conducts Rhona's scan at the hospital and Rhona sets her up on a date with Marlon Dingle (Mark Charnock). Stephanie and Marlon go for drinks at The Woolpack, but Marlon is not impressed with Stephanie.
25 February–27 July	Annie Kelly	Joanna Bond	Annie is Steve's (Andy Walker) wife. She helps support Hazel Rhodes (Pauline Quirke), whose son, Jackson Walsh (Marc Silcock), is a quadriplegic. She attends Jackson's funeral with Steve and tells Hazel that she did not give Jackson a chance. She also mentions that she is pregnant.
3–24 March	Josh Walsh	Benjamin Murphy	Josh is Jerry Walsh's (Michael J. Jackson) son from his second marriage. Jerry brings Josh to the village to introduce him to his half-brother Jackson Walsh (Marc Silcock). Jerry asks Jackson to be Josh's godfather and he initially turns down the offer. Aaron Livesy (Danny Miller) and Hazel Rhodes (Pauline Quirke) later convince him to do the job, but he fails to go to the christening after an argument with them. Jerry brings Josh round and Aaron gives him a toy shark as a gift.
23 June, 11–19 April 2013	Dylan Murray	Mikey Thomasson	Dylan and Harry are Cameron Murray's (Dominic Power) sons. They come to stay with their father for a brief time in Emmerdale. The boys return a couple of years later to stay with Cameron and his fiancée, Chas Dingle (Lucy Pargeter).
23 June, 11–19 April 2013	Harry Murray	Alfie Middlemiss	Dylan and Harry are Cameron Murray's (Dominic Power) sons. They come to stay with their father for a brief time in Emmerdale. The boys return a couple of years later to stay with Cameron and his fiancée, Chas Dingle (Lucy Pargeter).
18 July–16 August	Jared Haynes	Philip Hill-Pearson	Jared arrives in the village to attend a party thrown by his friend, Amy Wyatt (Chelsea Halfpenny). Jared threatens to tell Amy's guardians about her past and he starts to blackmail her for money. He later reveals Amy ruined his family, by having sex with his father. Zak Dingle (Steve Halliwell) tells Jared to leave and he does.
25–28 July	Prosecutor	James Gaddas	The prosecutor during Aaron Livesy's (Danny Miller) trial.
25–28 July	Defence	Tony Maudsley	Maudsley is Aaron Livesy's (Danny Miller) lawyer.
25–28 July	Judge	Mary Jo Randle	Randle is the judge presiding over Aaron Livesy's (Danny Miller) trial.
9 December–6 April	DI Fletcher	Nicola Harrison	DI Fletcher and DS Bedford are the leading officers in Cain Dingle's (Jeff Hordley) attempted murder case. They question many of the Emmerdale residents and arrest Jai Sharma (Chris Bisson) for the crime, but are later forced to let him go.
9 December–6 April	DS Bedford	James Quinn	DI Fletcher and DS Bedford are the leading officers in Cain Dingle's (Jeff Hordley) attempted murder case. They question many of the Emmerdale residents and arrest Jai Sharma (Chris Bisson) for the crime, but are later forced to let him go.
