= Nikhil Sharma =

Fictional character from Emmerdale

- Emmerdale character
- Portrayed by: Rik Makarem
- Duration: 2009–2013, 2015–2016
- First appearance: 11 September 2009
- Last appearance: 19 February 2016
- Introduced by: Gavin Blyth (2009); Kate Oates (2015)
In-universe information
- Occupation: Factory Manager (2009–2013, 2015–2016); Entrepreneur (2013–)
- Father: Rishi Sharma
- Mother: Georgia Sharma
- Sisters: Priya Sharma
- Half-brothers: Jai Sharma
- Wife: Gennie Walker (2013)
- Daughters: Molly Sharma
- Nephews: Archie Breckle
- Nieces: Mia Macey; Amba Metcalfe; Eliza Sharma
- First cousins: Anisha Sharma

Nikhil Sharma is a fictional character from the British ITV soap opera Emmerdale, played by Rik Makarem. He made his first screen appearance during the episode broadcast on 11 September 2009. Makarem's departure from the soap was announced on 16 May 2013, and Nikhil made his screen exit on 20 August 2013. Makarem reprised the role in September 2015 and Nikhil returned on 29 October 2015. However, it was confirmed that his return would only be temporary and he departed on 19 February 2016.

== Creation and casting ==
On 21 July 2009, Kris Green of Digital Spy reported Emmerdale's' new series producer, Gavin Blyth, would be introducing a new family called the Sharmas as part of an ongoing overhaul of the show. The family, which consisted of three siblings, arrived in the village to manage a new confectionery factory. Of the siblings, Blyth said "The Sharmas are a young, contemporary family independent of their parents and will bring the factory into the heart of the village community. They will add real vitality to life in Emmerdale." Chris Bisson was cast as the eldest sibling, Jai, and Effie Woods was cast as the youngest sibling, Priya (later played by Fiona Wade).

Former Torchwood actor Makarem was cast in the role of the middle Sharma sibling, Nikhil. Makarem told Heather Greenway of the Sunday Mail that he could not speak when he learned he had gotten a role in Emmerdale. He explained the job was a dream come true as he and his family had grown up watching the soap. Makarem hoped the Sharma family would become permanent fixtures on Emmerdale, saying "I'm contracted until the new year but I am hoping the Sharmas are here to stay." Bisson, Makarem and Woods filmed their first scenes on the same day as their casting announcement. Makarem made his on screen debut as Nikhil on 11 September 2009.

== Development ==
"Nikhil comes across as being a little shy in social situations but he's very focused and determined as far as business is concerned. He tries to show off a steely exterior but it belies a soft centre. He's not so worldly-wise and can be quite gullible but when pushed he can easily demonstrate an iron backbone."

— itv.com on Nikhil

Upon announcement of his casting, Makarem described his character as being "focused, determined and ambitious." The actor said Nikhil is an intense character, who ruffles a lot of feathers, but under the surface he is very likeable and has a lot of vulnerability. Makarem said Nikhil loves his siblings and tries his best to protect to Priya because she gets up to a lot of mischief. Of Nikhil's relationship with his brother, Makarem said "Nikhil and Jai are a bit of a comedy duo. Jai knows how to wind up Nikhil. They are very different characters – Nikhil is more serious, more complex and more meticulous, whereas Jai is the maverick showman." A writer for Inside Soap described Nikhil as "humble, gentlemanly, sweet and caring."

=== Departure ===
On 16 May 2013, Makarem announced his departure from Emmerdale. The announcement came shortly after Makarem's co-star and on-screen wife Sian Reese-Williams (Genesis Walker) revealed that she was also leaving the show. Of his reasons for departing, Makarem stated "When making my decision to leave, on both artistic and personal levels, I listened very closely to my heart. I'm naturally ambitious – I believe in taking risks, as that's how we truly learn about ourselves, how we grow, and with this integrity in mind, I'm completely inspired for the journey ahead." On-screen, Nikhil realises that he cannot stay in the village following his wife's death and he takes a job in Toronto. He departed on 20 August 2013.

=== Return ===
On 6 September 2015, it was announced that Makarem had reprised his role and would begin filming that same month. Of his return, Makarem commented "With fresh energy and wisdom from playing other characters, I'm over the moon to be re-investing in Nikhil. Emmerdale is fantastic at character-driven stories and for any actor, this is massively rewarding." Series producer Kate Oates explained that it was inevitable that Nikhil would return to the village one day and be reunited with his family. Oates later teased Nikhil's return, saying that viewers could expect a change in him upon his return. She commented, "He was always such a specific character with OCD and his quirks, but he has been away, coped as a single parent and run businesses of his own. So he will come back with a bit more confidence and a bit more stature. Jai won't know what has hit him!" It was later confirmed that Nikhil's return would be temporary. Nikhil returned on 29 October 2015 and departed on 19 February 2016.

== Storylines ==
Nikhil and his brother Jai arrive in the village, having purchased a new sweet factory. The brothers soon realise they have locked themselves out of their new home and ask the Dingles for help in breaking in. After successfully gaining entry, Lisa Dingle convinces Jai to give her husband Zak a job in the factory as the driver. Jai agrees. Nikhil reminded his brother that he was the real boss and did not want Jai undermining him. This has provided a source of tension between the brothers as they opened the factory. As their business venture continued, Nikhil decided to leave the business to his brother, who had been taking control despite Nikhil being the actual owner. He eventually decided to stay however, and promoted his sister Priya to supervisor.

Nikhil starts dating Maisie Wylde and they become engaged. But when Maisie admits that she does not love Nikhil, they break up and she leaves Emmerdale. After briefly dating both Katie Sugden and Chas Dingle, Nikhil is shocked when Genesis Walker admits that she loves him. Nikhil rejects Gennie, but when she begins dating Nicky Pritchard, Nikhil becomes jealous and realises he has feelings for her. Nikhil admits his love to Gennie and they share a kiss. Gennie then ends her relationship with Nicky to begin dating Nikhil. Nikhil becomes confused when Gennie starts acting strangely and he decides they should take a break. However, Charity reveals that Gennie is pregnant. Nikhil then proposes to Gennie and she initially accepts until she realises he knows about her pregnancy and she turns him down. The following day, after Nikhil pledges his love to Gennie and the baby, she agrees to marry him. During Chas's wedding reception, Gennie goes into labour and gives birth to her and Nikhil's daughter, who they name Molly. Gennie and Nikhil marry, although the reception is interrupted when Gennie's adoptive mother Brenda collapses. Nikhil is disgusted when his father, Rishi, lies that he is the father of Rachel Breckle's son.

After marrying Gennie, Nikhil decides that he wants a fresh start and a steady future for Molly, so decides to buy Val and Eric Pollard's B&B and suggests that they turn the place into a posh hotel. However, his plans are wrecked when he is told that Gennie has died. After Gennie's death, Nikhil begins to behave strangely so his family try to get him to be there for Molly but this fails when he arrives at The Woolpack with her and gives her to Debbie before leaving. After many attempts, people decide in order to get Nikhil to bond with Molly, they leave her at his home and guard all the exits to stop him from running off. This finally causes Nikhil to bond with Molly again and the following week, the pair leave the village, for Toronto, after Nikhil is offered a chance to invest money into a hotel. Brenda, Bob and Jai later call Nikhil to inform him that Gennie was murdered by Cameron Murray (Dominic Power). Since leaving the village, Nikhil has become a successful entrepreneur, investing money into hotels across Europe.

Two years later, Nikhil returns to England. He and Molly meet with Rishi, who informs him about Jai's recent behaviour. Rishi asks Nikhil to return to the village and take over the running of the factory. Nikhil declines as he feels settled in Toronto and he wants to avoid Debbie because of the way she betrayed Gennie. However, he later turns up in the village to see David Metcalfe (Matthew Wolfenden) and agrees to take over the running of the factory. His girlfriend Tanya later arrives, but she soon returns to Canada after Jai attempts to blackmail her. After, Nikhil discovers that Megan is pregnant with Jai's baby and tries to make her escape to London. Jai discovers Megan's secret and runs her over and Nikhil demotes him to a packer in the factory.

In January 2016 Nikhil starts to date Leyla Harding. This causes tension between Jai and Nikhil. Jai leaves the village to stay with their mother, Georgia. Meanwhile, Jacob runs away from Alicia, who has separated from David and is living in Portugal, and unexpectedly returns to the village. After a few distraught conversations about this with Alicia, David decides to go to Portugal to attempt to sort things with her. Whilst he's away he asks Leyla to move into Farrers to look after Jacob. This pleases Nikhil & Leyla and their relationship intensifies. Unfortunately Leyla contracts the norovirus and is hospitalised. She becomes delirious and refers to Nikhil as her fiancé! A mortified Leyla later apologises to Nikhil who laughs it off. Later in the cafe Leyla proposes to Nikhil, who accepts. Sadly the couple's euphoria following their engagement is short lived when Nikhil is summoned back to Canada by his employers. He later books Leyla a flight but she is not overly happy. Jai returns to the village following a session in rehab. The Sharma brothers come to blows and Nikhil realises Leyla doesn't truly love him. Sadly he breaks off the engagement leaving Leyla heartbroken. He and Molly then leave to return to Canada leaving Brenda devastated at the loss of her granddaughter.

In 2017, Rishi, Bob, and Brenda went to visit Nikhil and Molly in Canada off-screen as Nikhil had contracted meningitis. Bob returned to Emmerdale earlier than the other two, while Rishi and Brenda stayed behind in Canada for a time to look after Nikhil and Molly.

== Reception ==
A columnist for the Liverpool Echo branded the character a "heartthrob", while the Daily Mirror's Jane Simon was unsure why Cain would object to Nikhil dating his daughter, noting "he's rich, single, goodlooking, successful and pathetically keen to do Debbie's bidding". Simon's colleague Maeve Quigley was in agreement and said "What is wrong with the women of Emmerdale? Nikhil is the prettiest, kindest bloke in the village".

An Inside Soap writer branded Nikhil "perfect" and said it was weird how he did not seem capable of "pulling anyone, anywhere." They added "he's basically most women's ideal guy – so get in there, girls!" A reporter for The Bath Chronicle had a similar reaction, writing "Many viewers would argue that if there was a competition to find the most eligible man in Emmerdale, Nikhil would be a shoe-in. However, it seems the village's female residents aren't quite so convinced of his charms, as the poor bloke really does struggle to hang on to his girlfriend." A Sunday Sun contributor did not think Nikhil and Gennie should be together, commenting "Gennie and Nikhil as a couple? Don't make me laugh. It's like having fish and chips with a side order of caviar."
