= Liam Fox (actor) =

British actor

- Born: Manchester, England
- Occupation: Actor
- Known for: Emmerdale
- Spouses: Nicole Barber-Lane (m. 1999; div. 2015) Joanna Hudson (m. 2020)
- Children: 2

Liam Fox is a British actor, known for playing Dan Spencer in the ITV soap opera Emmerdale from 2011 to 2023.

== Career ==
Fox has appeared in Dinnerladies and Coronation Street. He joined the cast of Emmerdale in late 2011 as Dan Spencer, the estranged husband of Ali Spencer (Kelli Hollis). He was initially contracted for eight episodes, but he was later promoted to the main cast. Fox previously made guest appearances in the show as Les (1993) and PC Tyrell (2002–2003) and Officer Price (2004). For his portrayal of Dan, Fox received a nomination for Most Popular Newcomer at the 18th National Television Awards. In 2019, he starred in horror movie Demon Eye.

== Personal life ==
Fox married actress Nicole Barber-Lane in 1999. They have two children together. In February 2015, they announced that they were to divorce. Fox married Joanna Hudson in 2020. Hudson and Fox had previously dated at university.

Fox is a fan of Manchester United.

== Awards and nominations ==
Year	Award	Category	Result	Ref.
2013	18th National Television Awards	Newcomer	Nominated	
2013	Inside Soap Awards	Best Actor	Nominated	
2014	Inside Soap Awards	Funniest Male	Nominated	
