= Kelli Hollis =

British actress (born 1976)

- Born: 29 June 1976 (age 49); Leeds, England
- Occupation: Actress
- Years active: 1999–present
- Children: 1

Kelli Hollis (born 29 June 1976) is an English actress, known for playing Tina Crabtree in the three Channel 4 related films, shop owner Yvonne Karib in Channel 4's comedy-drama Shameless and then as Ali Spencer in ITV's long-running soap opera Emmerdale.

== Career ==
After a small role in Emmerdale as Melanie Say in 2002, Hollis portrayed Yvonne Karib in Shameless for six years, starting in 2004. She also played the character of Tina Crabtree in two television dramas, Tina Goes Shopping (1999), Tina Takes a Break (2001) as well as Mischief Night (2006) which was a cinema-released feature film, all three were directed by Penny Woolcock. Hollis also portrayed Maggie Simms in the 5Star prison drama Clink, as well as loan shark Linda in the Channel 4 drama Ackley Bridge. Additionally, Hollis appeared in two episodes of the television series Dalziel and Pascoe, as the character Bridget Croft. She also appeared in BBC1 drama Waterloo Road, as Chantel and as Anne West in the TV film See No Evil about the Moors Murders. She also appeared in the female football drama Playing the Field. In May 2020, she appeared in an episode of the BBC soap opera Doctors as Rachel Edwards. In February 2026. Hollis joined the cast of Coronation Street for a short guest role, playing Paula a prisoner who is in jail alongside Debbie Webster.

== Personal life ==
In 2024, Hollis relocated to Pattaya, Thailand, where she established a cannabis business named La Choza Pratumnak, following the legalisation of marijuana in the country. The venture was inspired by her and her partner’s growing connection to the area and their decision to settle there permanently. Hollis has described the move as part of a broader lifestyle change, opting for a quieter life away from the UK entertainment industry.
