= Kitty McGeever =

English actress and comedian

- Born: Catherine Jane Mitchell; 15 October 1966; Bramley, Leeds, England
- Died: 16 August 2015 (aged 48); Bradford, West Yorkshire, England
- Other name: Kate McGeever
- Occupations: Actress, comedian
- Known for: Beyond Fear (1997); B. Monkey (1998); Emmerdale (2009–2013)
- Children: 1

Catherine Jane Mitchell (15 October 1966 – 16 August 2015), known professionally as Kitty McGeever, was an English actress and comedian.

She was the first blind actress to be cast in a British soap opera, playing the fictional character Lizzie Lakely in Emmerdale from April 2009 to March 2013.

== Life and career ==
Born in Bramley, Leeds, McGeever grew up in Liversedge and Farsley, West Yorkshire. She changed her name from Catherine Mitchell to Kitty McGeever as there was already an actress named Catherine Mitchell. She trained at RADA and was diagnosed as diabetic at the age of 19.

McGeever became pregnant in 2001, but developed pre-eclampsia. Her son Felix was born two months early; he spent some time in a special care baby unit. At the age of four months, he suddenly became very ill, having problems with his heart and lungs. During her son's illness, McGeever also became ill due to the stress—her kidneys stopped working, she had heart trouble and diabetic retinopathy caused her to begin to lose her sight. Laser treatment was ineffective; five months later she was blind at the age of 32. Her son Felix died in January 2003, aged fifteen months. She was given a kidney transplant in a successful 12-hour operation. Following her recovery, she contacted her agent in 2008 and suggested that she was ready to begin performing again and would consider television.

She was spotted by production staff from the soap Emmerdale when she was appearing in a one-woman stage show where she talked about her life as a blind woman. They approached her with a view to creating an authentic blind character for Emmerdale, to be played by McGeever, who would also develop the part. She first appeared as former criminal Lizzie Lakely in Emmerdale on 28 April 2009, at the age of 42; Lakely was the first permanent blind character in a British soap. She was given her scripts as sound recordings and had two government-sponsored assistants to guide her around the studios; they also guided her through the sets during rehearsals and ensured continuity between recordings.

On 5 January 2010, McGeever appeared on the BBC Radio 4 programme In Touch, when she talked to Peter White about losing her sight. She revealed that she had a number of gadgets to assist her, including a CD storage system where audible labels can be recorded, a colour detector to assist with choosing a coordinating outfit and a pair of long-armed oven gloves.

In February 2013, it was reported that McGeever had been hospitalised and awaiting a heart transplant. Her sister, Emmerdale scriptwriter Caroline Mitchell, denied her sister was awaiting a heart transplant, but stated that she was on the transplant register.

== Death ==
McGeever died on 16 August 2015, aged 48. It was confirmed that she had been waiting for a kidney transplant and had asked for her organs to be donated to help others.

Her final movie was Eugene McGing's 2016 horror movie The Unfolding.
