= Gemma Oaten =

English actress

- Born: 8 May 1984 (age 41); Kingston upon Hull, England
- Education: Drama Studio London
- Occupation: Actress
- Television: Emmerdale

Gemma Oaten (born 8 May 1984) is an English actress. She is known for playing the role of Rachel Breckle in Emmerdale from 2011 to 2015, for which she received a nomination for the British Soap Award for Best Newcomer. Since leaving Emmerdale, Oaten has made appearances in various television series and films, including Rise of the Footsoldier: The Pat Tate Story, Holby City and Coronation Street. As well as her onscreen roles, Oaten has also starred in various theatre productions across the UK, including stints in Bedroom Farce and Up 'n' Under.

== Early and personal life ==
Oaten was born on 8 May 1984 in Kingston upon Hull, England, to Marg and Dennis Oaten. She developed anorexia at the age of 10 and endured a thirteen-year-long battle with the illness, which left her close to death on several occasions. She studied acting and graduated from the Drama Studio London. Oaten is a patron and charity manager of the eating disorder charity Seed, and in 2022, she launched her own recovery programme. In April 2022, she was diagnosed with milk-alkali syndrome.

== Career ==
Oaten made her acting debut in January 2011 when she appeared in two episodes of the BBC soap opera Doctors as Sam Doyle. Six months later, she was cast as Rachel Breckle in the ITV soap opera Emmerdale. Oaten decided to leave the soap in October 2013 and made her on-screen exit in January 2014. She returned to the soap in January 2015 and departed once again in August. The character was later killed off in 2019, ruling out a return for Oaten. For her role as Rachel, Oaten received nominations in the Newcomer categories at the TV Quick Awards and British Soap Awards. In April 2015, she played Stacey Bayton in an episode of the BBC medical drama series Casualty. Between 2017 and 2018, she joined the cast of Holby City and played the role of Sydney Somers in four episodes. In 2021, Oaten portrayed Isla Haywood in two episodes of the ITV soap opera Coronation Street. Outside of acting, Oaten has appeared on Celebrity Antiques Road Trip, and several daytime television shows such as This Morning and Lorraine where she has openly discussed her experiences with anorexia.

== Filmography ==
Year	Title	Role	Notes
2011	Doctors	Sam Doyle	2 episodes
2011–2015	Emmerdale	Rachel Breckle	Series regular
2015	Casualty	Stacey Bayton	Episode: "Something Borrowed, Something Blue"
2015	Pick Up	Girl	Short film
2017	Film Stars Don't Die in Liverpool	Patient	Film
2017	Rise of the Footsoldier: The Pat Tate Story	Lucy	Film
2017–2018	Holby City	Sydney Somers	4 episodes
2021	Coronation Street	Isla Haywood	3 episodes

== Stage ==
Year	Title	Role	Venue	Ref.
2016	Bedroom Farce	Jan	Gordon Craig Theatre	
2017	Up 'n' Under	Hazel	Gordon Craig Theatre	
2018	Going Ape	Unknown	Dance Attic Studios	
2019	Ten Times Table	Sophie	UK tour	
2024	Dick Whittington meets the Pirates from the Caribbean	Fairy Bowbells	Grimsby Auditorium	

== Awards and nominations ==
Year	Award	Category	Nominated work	Result	Ref.
2012	TV Quick Awards	Best Soap Newcomer	Emmerdale	Nominated	
2012	The British Soap Awards	Best Newcomer	Emmerdale	Nominated	
