= Fiona Wade =

English actress

- Born: Fiona Sarah Wade; 20 March 1979 (age 47); Enfield, Greater London, England
- Occupation: Actress
- Years active: 1996–present
- Television: Grange Hill; 24Seven; Emmerdale
- Spouse: Simon Cotton (m. 2019)

Fiona Sarah Wade (born 20 March 1979) is an English actress, known for playing Priya Sharma in Emmerdale from 2011 to 2023.

== Career ==
In 2008, Wade played Mamta in a play called Alaska by DC Moore at the Royal Court Jerwood Theatre Upstairs. Since 2011, Wade has played Priya Sharma in the ITV soap opera Emmerdale. Her first appearance was in November 2011. In January 2017, Wade took part in the primetime ITV entertainment series Dance Dance Dance. In October 2022, it was announced that Wade was set to leave Emmerdale after 11 years. In recent years Wade has taken part in touring theatre plays including 2:22 A Ghost Story and Picture You Dead.

== Personal life ==
Wade's mother is Filipina and her father is English. She married fellow actor and former Emmerdale co-star Simon Cotton in 2019. She is a follower of the Baháʼí Faith.

== Filmography & Theatre Credits ==
Year	Title	Role	Notes
1996–1998	Grange Hill	Joanna Day	35 episodes
2001–2002	24Seven	Anya Vicenze	
2004, 2009	Doctors	Decca Taylor/Shahnaz Malick	3 episodes
2006	Where the Heart Is	Rowan Clayton	5 episodes
2006	Genie in the House	Dooma	1 episode
2007	Holby City	Julianna McKenzie	1 episode
2007	Wire in the Blood	Ayesha	1 episode
2008	Waterloo Road	Sameen Azizi	2 episodes
2008	Silent Witness	Anhil Edwards	2 episodes
2009	Casualty	Nita	1 episode
2010	Tracy Beaker Returns	Helen Howle	1 episode
2010	Lewis	Meera	1 episode
2010	Law & Order: UK	Uniform officer	1 episode
2011	Coronation Street	Sandeesh	2 episodes
2011–2023	Emmerdale	Priya Sharma	Series regular
2013, 2023	The Chase Celebrity Special	Herself	9 November 2013, 3 June 2023
2017	Dance Dance Dance	Herself	Contestant
2024	2:22 A Ghost Story	Jenny	January - June UK Tour
2025	Picture You Dead	Freya Kipling	UK Tour

== Awards and nominations ==
Year	Award	Category	Result	Ref.
2013	The British Soap Awards	Sexiest Female	Nominated	
2014	The British Soap Awards	Sexiest Female	Nominated	
2017	Inside Soap Awards	Sexiest Female	Nominated	
