= Tarik Makarem =

English actor (born 1982)

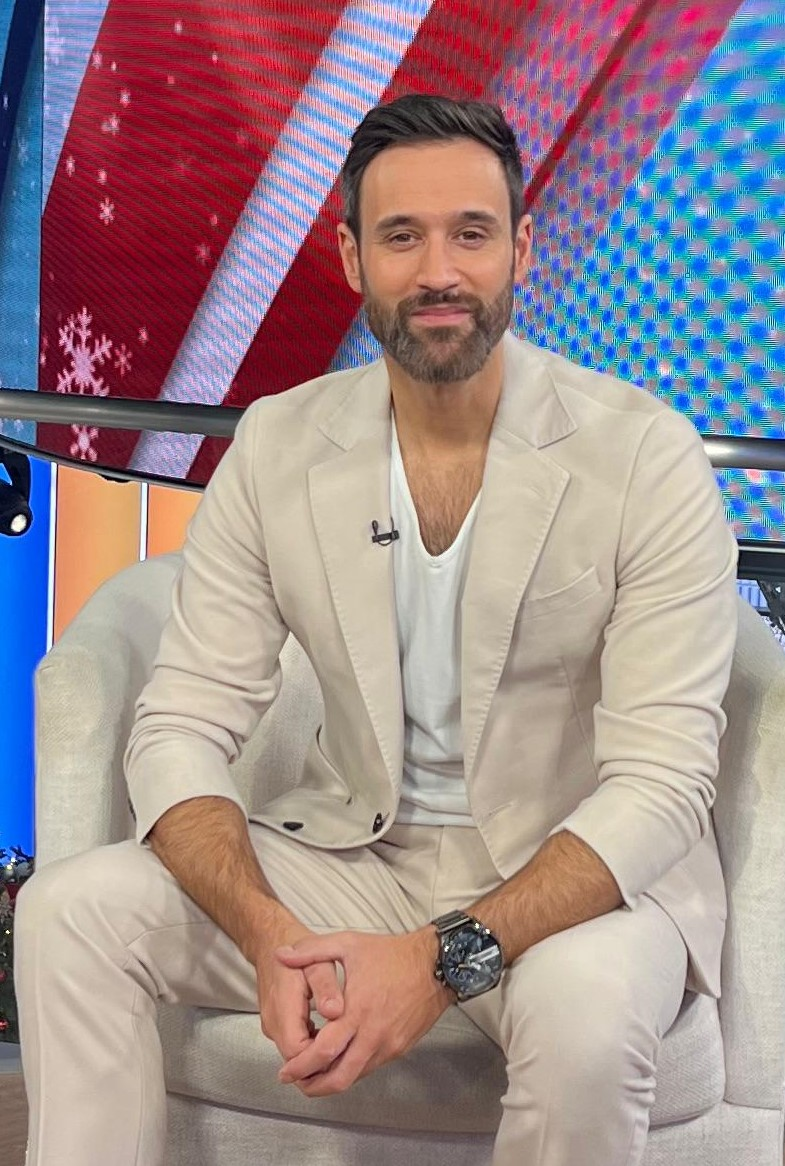
- Tarik Makarem in New York Dec 2025 for Fox's Jesus Crown of Thorns
- Born: 18 January 1982 (age 44); London, England
- Occupation: Actor
- Years active: 2004–present

Tarik Andrew James Makarem is an English actor. He is best known for his lead performance as Jesus of Nazareth in the historical drama series Jesus Crown of Thorns on FOX and as Nikhil Sharma in ITV’s Emmerdale (2009–2016).

He is an alumnus of the prestigious drama institution Royal Conservatoire of Scotland, winning a Laurence Olivier Bursary, in association with the Society of London Theatre.

== Early life ==
Makarem was born and raised in Chesterfield, North Derbyshire, to an English mother and Lebanese father.

== Name change ==
In 2025, professionally, Makarem reclaimed his full name, Tarik Makarem, instead of the abbreviated Rik Makarem he had been encouraged to use by the industry upon graduation from Drama School. Makarem was quoted as saying as recently as December 2025 on the Fox Rundown Podcast “the industry wouldn't represent me, unless I changed my name. A white, tanned guy, with a name like Tarik? But I understood they were just trying to protect me, but the world has changed now hopefully.”

== Television ==
Makarem is widely known for his lead series regular role Nikhil Sharma in ITV's Emmerdale, playing across both dramatic and comedic storylines and starring in over 620 episodes, including the famous LIVE anniversary episode in 2012, and was nominated for his comedic performances.

In May 2013 Makarem announced he was leaving the programme to pursue other roles and his character would be left open for return.

After a string of leading theatre roles, Makarem confirmed in September 2015 that he'd been asked by producers to reprise his role as Nikhil for a “powerful” storyline, departing again in February 2016. On 1st September 2016, Makarem confirmed he had joined the cast of BBC's BAFTA winning drama Casualty, as Dr Sebastian "Seb" Grayling in a leading storyline with William Beck playing into 2017. Casualty would go on to win Best Drama at the NTA's in 2017, beating Tom Hiddleston's The Night Manager and Game of Thrones.

Other starring television roles include his guest lead performance as double-crossing agent, Rupesh Patanjali, in Russell T Davies’ BBC global smash hit and Doctor Who spin off series, Torchwood: Children of Earth, alongside John Barrowman. The 3rd series received the highest critical acclaim of all. Makarem also featured in an episode of ITV period drama Foyle’s War, a storyline which also starred Andrew Scott. Other notable TV works include Consent for Channel 4 starring with Daniel Mays and Michelle Dockery, and ITV comedy FM, alongside Chris O’Dowd and Daniel Kaluuya.

In 2022, Makarem joined the BBC One and Showtime USA series We Hunt Together, in the role of James O’Neil. The 2nd series first played on Alibi UK and Showtime USA before getting its BBC One spot.

In 2024 Makarem was cast as the series lead, Jesus of Nazareth, in the historical drama Jesus Crown of Thorns. Season one premiered on FOX in the USA December 2024 and 2 further seasons were green-lit. Season 2 premiered on FOX December 2025. Makarem was quoted as saying that being cast to play Jesus “was the greatest honour of my life” Season 3 is set to be released in 2026.

== Film ==
Makarem starred alongside Andrew Scott, Tobias Menzies and Fiona Glascott in the period feature film The Duel.

== Theatre ==
In late 2013 Makarem starred in a London production of Martin Sherman’s Passing By, in the lead role of Toby opposite James Cartwright. The production received much critical acclaim for Makarem and his co-star's performance.

In 2014 Makarem co-starred opposite with the legendary music and film icon David Essex in a touring production of Morris Panych’s The Dishwashers. Makarem, again received positive reviews alongside his colleague. What's On Stage went on to say “Makarem beautifully compliments his cast mates as he provides a new and different approach to the existential crisis that appears throughout the play”.

2015 saw Makarem co-star with Tina Hobley and Michael McKell, in a nationwide theatrical tour and the International premiere of Peter James’s Dead Simple. Makarem was noted by the critics, describing him to “stun the audience with the calculating meticulousness of his role”.

== Presenting ==
Documented across social media, Makarem has begun presenting and hosting Live Formula One events and content in varying formats, such as the Las Vegas Grand Prix with McLaren and other presenting spots for Motorsport UK.

== Other ==
Makarem appeared on All Star Family Fortunes, the celebrity gameshow alongside his family in March 2012.

He studied drama at Chesterfield college and is a first degree black belt in TaeKwon-Do.

=== Films ===
Year	Film	Role	Notes
2006	Without Walls	Witness (Lead)	Short film
2010	The Duel	Atchmianov	Feature Film
2020	Counting Shadows	Matthews	Short film

=== TV ===
Year	Show	Role	Notes
2004	C-JAQ	Jake	10 part series
2007	Consent	Shiv	Drama
2009	FM	James	1 Episode: Video Killed the Radio Star
2009	Torchwood	Dr. Rupesh Patanjali	Series 3 Children of Earth: Day One
2009–2013, 2015–2016	Emmerdale	Nikhil Sharma	Series Regular
2010	Foyle's War	Simon Rothstein	1 Episode: The Hide
2016–2017	Casualty	Sebastian Grayling (F1 Doctor)	Series Regular
2022	We Hunt Together S2	James O'Neil	1 Episode (BBC One & Showtime)
2024–2025-2026	Jesus Crown of Thorns	Jesus of Nazareth	Series Lead (FOX) 3 Seasons

== Awards and nominations ==
Year	Award	Category	Result	Ref.
2012	Inside Soap Awards	Funniest Male	Nominated	
2013	Inside Soap Awards	Funniest Male	Nominated	
