= Nathan Wylde =

Fictional character from Emmerdale

- Emmerdale character
- Portrayed by: Lyndon Ogbourne
- Duration: 2009–2010
- First appearance: 17 February 2009
- Last appearance: 26 November 2010
- Introduced by: Anita Turner
In-universe information
- Occupation: Businessman
- Father: Mark Wylde
- Mother: Natasha Wylde
- Brothers: Will Wylde
- Sisters: Maisie Wylde
- Half-brothers: Ryan Lamb

Nathan Wylde is a fictional character from the British television soap opera Emmerdale, played by Lyndon Ogbourne. He made his first appearance on 17 February 2009 and his last on 26 November 2010.

== Casting ==
On 19 January 2009, Kris Green of Digital Spy reported that Emmerdale would be introducing Natasha (Amanda Donohoe) and Mark Wylde's (Maxwell Caulfield) three children the following month. Actor Lyndon Ogbourne was cast in the role of Nathan, the eldest child and the brother of Maisie Wylde (Alice Coulthard) and Will Wylde (Oscar Lloyd). Ogbourne went through a long audition process and he described it as being "completely different to anything I'd auditioned for before." He explained that as the new family were important to the show, producers took longer to cast the children. Ogbourne reckoned that he attended five or six auditions before he secured the role. In his last audition, he screen tested with Donohoe and Caulfield and said the bond they formed there was evident to see in the family's early episodes. Of joining Emmerdale, Ogbourne stated: "I am really excited to be playing the role of Nathan Wylde. He is a bit of a rogue and I'm looking forward to bringing out his darker side. He's definitely not as nice as he seems." Asked about if he has settled in, Ogbourne said: "It's been really cool. I'd heard amazing things about the cast and crew before I joined and it's cheesy to say it but it's entirely true – everyone's so warm and welcoming. It's very much been a case of me being thrown in at the deep end with long, all-consuming days. But I think that's the best way to be, though."

== Development ==
ITV1 describe Nathan as "scheming and manipulative", and "always wants his own way". Channel Five's soap opera reporting website Holy Soap describe him as "privileged".

== Storylines ==
Nathan and his sister, Maisie, arrive in the village for their father's 50th birthday party. Nathan is immediately attracted to Katie Sugden (Sammy Winward), and when he hears that she has a date with Lee Naylor (Lewis Linford), Nathan delays him with questions about his work. Nathan – who attended agricultural college – is tasked with running the estate by his parents. He continues pursuing Katie, causing trouble between her and Lee by successfully manipulating them both. Following an argument with Lee, Katie invites Nathan to spend the night with her. The next day, however, she catches him sneaking out and he admits to not wanting a serious relationship until he sees her reconcile with Lee.

Nathan works with Eric Pollard (Chris Chittell), assisting his campaign to be re-elected as local councillor. He gets to Eric's son David Metcalfe (Matthew Wolfenden) who is standing against him, via his girlfriend, Leyla Harding (Roxy Shahidi). Nathan gives Leyla a job, an advance for new clothes and makes a large donation to her mother's nursing home. On finding out, Leyla asks him to withdraw it but he refuses, making it clear what he wants in return. Disgusted, she throws a suit at him and leaves. She tells David and they confront Nathan who loses his temper, and Leyla throws water over him to cool down. David is elected as councillor. Nathan learns Lee is moving in with Katie and he causes trouble for them again, causing Lee to quit his job. Katie ends her relationship with Nathan and throws Lee out. Nathan responds by trying to sabotage her business and Katie responds by telling him she is moving her business elsewhere, but when this fails, Nathan raises her rent.

Nathan befriends Ryan Lamb (James Sutton). He is not pleased when Ryan and Katie start dating, but is more distressed with his father's affair with Ryan's mother Faye Lamb (Kim Thomson). He goes to London for a while to clear his head. Returning his attentions to Leyla, Nathan separates her and David by using his parents' contacts to get David more work. Leyla borrows money from the petty cash in the farm shop's till and is caught when Nathan collects it early. He conceals it when Leyla confesses and starts charming her, taking her to exclusive parties. They have sex, but Leyla feels guilty and Nathan blackmails her into taking responsibility for crashing a car while drunk. Leyla and David break up when she admits to cheating on him. David then hits Nathan for bullying her. Natasha learns David hit Nathan, but Nathan twists it so that Leyla gets the blame. Leyla then visits him and tells him she will not quit her job and knees him in the groin. After this, Nathan leaves Leyla alone.

After Mark disappears, Nathan takes over running Home Farm. Nathan learns that Faye is Mark's first wife and Ryan is his half-brother. When Natasha begins behaving erratically, Nathan confronts her and she tells him that she killed Mark and buried his body on the Estate grounds. Nathan tries to locate his father's body and dig it up, but Natasha subdues him by telling him that it had been an accident and that the gun had discharged during a struggle. Nathan agrees to keep his mother's secret, but demands her fortune in return. Natasha reluctantly gives him everything on the condition that he leaves and never returns. Nathan keeps his side of the bargain and leaves the village.

Nathan returns a few months later. Natasha agrees to let him stay at Home Farm if he pays back the money he blackmailed from her, which he does. Nathan takes an instant dislike to his mother's new business partner, Declan Macey (Jason Merrells), who had bought Nathan's share of the estate. Nathan demands his share back, but Declan refuses to give it to him. Nathan is further enraged when Declan and Natasha begin a relationship and he threatens to report her to the police for his father's murder, but Natasha threatens to take him down with her for helping her cover up the crime.

Nathan makes a deal with Declan after his plans for a barn renovation are turned down. Nathan offers to get the planning permission for Declan if he agreed to stay away from Natasha. To do this, Nathan blackmails local councillor David. He gets council employee Tania Page to attempt to seduce David and records it with a hidden video camera and makes it seem that he is having an affair. Nathan threatens to tell Leyla and show her the video if David did not agree to his demands. After David gets Nathan the planning permission, Declan notices that David appears unhappy and Nathan reveals that he blackmailed David, leaving Declan horrified.

A bouquet of flowers is sent to Home Farm and is signed with Mark's name and is paid for using his credit card. Natasha believes that Nathan sent the flowers as part of a sick joke and she throws them at his car as he drives up to the house. One of Mark's suits is sent to Declan's house and he confronts Nathan and accuses him of sending it. Nathan denies sending the flowers and the suit but he later pretends to confess to sending the flowers to Maisie in order to cover his mother's tracks.

Believing Nathan is the culprit, Maisie is upset and angry with him and orders him out of the pub when he comes in for a drink. Nathan goes to his car and discovers a note stuck to the windscreen saying "What are you hiding"? Nathan sees Ryan walking past and accuses him of being the stalker. Ryan is angry at the accusation and he and Nathan square up but Ryan's boss Cain Dingle (Jeff Hordley) breaks them up. Nathan later receives another note from the blackmailer arranging a meeting by the river. Nathan drives to the location and waits. The blackmailer reveals himself to be Cain, who says that he knows the Wyldes are hiding something. He asks Nathan to arrange a meeting between him and Natasha, who pays him to keep quiet and stay away from their family.

Mark's body is discovered by Sam Dingle (James Hooton) while he is walking his dog. Nathan and Natasha agree to frame Faye for the murder, but Nathan frames Ryan instead by planting the murder weapon at the garage where Ryan works. He also plants gunpowder residue on one of Ryan's shirts and places Ryan's gold chain at the scene of the crime. The day after Mark's body is found, Nathan is arrested and questioned by the police but later released without charge due to a lack of evidence. However, during his interrogation he discovers that Mark was shot from six feet away and that Natasha lied to him. Nathan tells Natasha that if she does not help prove his innocence, he will report her to the police himself.

Ryan is charged with murder after the police discover the gold chain Nathan planted and the gun at the garage. Nathan taunts Cain, knowing that Cain cannot help Ryan without incriminating himself for fraud and blackmail. At Mark's funeral, Nathan is visibly upset at the loss of his father. However, he is furious when he sees that Ryan has been given permission to attend. When Ryan attempts to speak to Maisie, Nathan attacks him.

When Maisie discovers a photo on her mobile phone of Ryan wearing his chain after the murder occurred, she becomes convinced of his innocence. After distracting her in the café, Nathan steals her phone from her bag and deletes the photo. Maisie manages to obtain another copy from Katie. After Cain tells Maisie about the blackmail and being paid by Natasha to keep quiet, she confronts Nathan and Natasha. She accuses Nathan of committing the murder and brands him a coward. Nathan begs Natasha to tell Maisie he is innocent and she does so. But Maisie does not believe them and leaves the village.

When Mark's will is read, Nathan receives his inheritance and flaunts his wealth, telling Faye and David that he will be test driving new cars. Nathan is outraged when Faye tells them she will contest the will. Nathan later visits Ryan is prison to gloat and mockingly asks him to tell Faye not to contest the will. When Nathan implies that he will hurt Faye, Ryan attacks him and they have to be separated. Nathan later discovers that Ryan is in a relationship with prison guard Abi Peterson (Catherine Tyldesley) when he sees her leaving Faye's house and recognises her from the prison visiting room. Nathan threatens to tell the prison service, and Abi is later transferred. Nathan lets himself into Faye's house after she accidentally leaves the back door open and taunts her, telling her that Ryan's relationship with Abi would have serious repercussions for him at the trial. Faye throws Nathan out.

Maisie later returns to the village and avoids Nathan. She stays with Faye and Nathan accuses her of trying to prove the innocence of their father's killer. Nathan later tells Natasha that he cannot cope with lying to Maisie any more and considers telling her the truth. But Natasha tells him that because Maisie is fragile, due to her previous mental health problems, the truth would be too much for her and it would cause her to go off the rails again. Nathan breaks down in tears in his mother's arms.

The following day, Nathan tells Natasha he is looking forward to seeing Ryan get imprisoned and she is relieved to have him on her side again. Maisie asks to meet Nathan and again asks him the truth about Mark's death but again he tells her that Ryan is the killer. When Ryan's trial begins, Nathan is nervous about giving evidence. However, when he testifies against his brother, he gives the jury the impression that Ryan is unstable due to his near incestuous relationship with Maisie, and jealous of the Wylde's for having the family he never had. After giving evidence, Nathan is kidnapped by Cain and held captive in the Dingles' old barn. He offers Cain money, but Cain refuses it and tells Nathan that if Ryan is found guilty, he will kill him. He pours beer over Nathan and taunts him. Cain later moves him to an abandoned barn on the moors.

Charity Tate (Emma Atkins) discovers Cain is holding Nathan captive, but she does not help Nathan. Ryan is found guilty and Cain tells Nathan things have got a lot worse for him. Cain summons Maisie to the barn and when Nathan sees her, he begs her to help him. Maisie refuses and demands the truth from Nathan about the circumstances of their father's death. She attacks him with a piece of wood. Believing that Maisie will kill him, Nathan reveals that Natasha is Mark's killer, but Maisie refuses to believe him. Cain fetches Natasha and Will and they arrive in time to see Maisie about to hit Nathan with the wood. Natasha confesses that she killed Mark. Maisie calls the police and Nathan begs Natasha to run away, but Natasha refuses and is arrested.

The following day, Nathan visits Maisie and convinces her to visit Natasha in prison. Maisie apologises to Nathan for believing him to be the killer. Natasha does not tell Maisie about framing Ryan. When she returns to Home Farm, Maisie admits that she will try to be a family with Nathan for Will's sake. After the Wyldes decide to leave Emmerdale and move back to London, Nathan is approached by Declan who offers to buy out Natasha's 49% ownership of Home Farm. He tells Nathan that if he convinces his mother to sell to him then Nathan would receive the money from Natasha's share of Home Farm instead of Natasha receiving it. Natasha signs over all her assets to Nathan.

Nathan refuses to accept Declan's offer, so he sets about finding a new buyer. After a few weeks, he finally finds a buyer and celebrates in The Woolpack by drinking a glass of champagne with barmaid Alicia Gallagher (Natalie Anderson), Leyla's sister. Ryan tries to start an argument with Nathan and after he insults Alicia, Nathan defends her and squares up to Ryan. Ryan leaves the pub and throws a brick through Nathan's car window. Nathan then attacks Ryan and Maisie is forced to separate them. Alicia leaves after Leyla and David tell her what Nathan is really like. The buyer comes to look at Home Farm, and subsequently reduces her offer. Nathan is furious and refuses to accept, but after Maisie begs him to reconsider, he does so and signs the paperwork. When he introduces the buyer to Declan, he is outraged to discover that he has been tricked when it is revealed that the buyer is Declan's ex-wife Ella Hart (Corrinne Wicks). Nathan refuses to let Declan have Home Farm, but knows that he is unable to do anything as the deeds have been signed over.

Nathan attends Natasha's sentencing and she is ordered to serve a minimum term of 21 years by the judge. Nathan drowns his sorrows in the pub and goads Ryan about being rich and having Maisie and Will choose him over Ryan. Ryan tries to attack Nathan and Declan and Cain are forced to restrain him. Cain orders Nathan to leave the pub and Ryan vows revenge on his brother. He goes to Home Farm while Nathan is packing up and tricks Nathan into confessing to setting him up. Unbeknownst to Nathan, Declan had hidden a recording device under the sofa and Ryan plays the recording to Maisie. Furious that he had lied to her again, Maisie leaves Home Farm with Will.

The following day, Nathan visits Ryan, who threatens to call the police. He offers Ryan anything to make up for what he has done. Ryan tells him to put his money in a trust fund for Will. When Nathan goes to Holdgate Farm to tell Maisie, Ryan appears and pins Nathan to his car and tells him that if he goes anywhere near Will or Maisie again, they will go to the police with the recording. Nathan returns to the Home Farm office and learns that his belongings are in storage. Declan demands the keys to the house and the car, and Nathan drops them on the floor. Declan throws him to the floor and orders him to pick them up. Nathan does so and Declan throws him outside. Nathan leaves the village that same day.

== Reception ==
For his portrayal of Nathan, Ogbourne was included on the longlist for Villain of the Year at the 2011 British Soap Awards.

Jane Simon and Brian McIver of the Daily Record were puzzled when Nathan "decided to stick his oar in" to defend Maisie's honour. They quipped "What's not clear is when nasty Nathan decided to set himself up as the village's arbiter of morality. Perhaps he was accidentally sent Edna Birch's script for this week and has been reading that by mistake." After Natasha confessed to killing Mark, a critic for the Sunday Mercury observed "That'll really help his already unbalanced state". When the character was held hostage, a reporter for the Sunderland Echo wrote "Something remarkable is set to happen in this hour-long edition of Emmerdale – viewers might actually find themselves feeling sorry for scheming brat Nathan Wylde." They also thought he had been looking "a lot less smug" since the kidnapping.

Holy Soap describe Nathan's most memorable moment as: "Being kicked in the groin by Leyla after she found out he was manipulating her and David." While Craig Jones from Leeds Live wrote that Nathan's most "memorable" storyline was "the cover-up of his father’s death".

== See also ==
- List of Emmerdale characters (2009)
- List of soap opera villains
