= Declan Macey =

Fictional character from Emmerdale

- Emmerdale character
- Portrayed by: Jason Merrells
- Duration: 2010–2014
- First appearance: 15 April 2010
- Last appearance: 13 October 2014
- Introduced by: Gavin Blyth
In-universe information
- Occupation: Businessman
- Father: Dermot Macey
- Half-sisters: Megan Macey
- Wife: Ella Macey (backstory); Katie Sugden (2012–2013); Charity Dingle (2014–2015)
- Adoptive daughters: Mia Macey
- Stepsons: Noah Dingle
- Stepdaughters: Debbie Dingle
- Nephews: Robbie Lawson
- Nieces: Eliza Sharma

Declan Macey is a fictional character from the British ITV soap opera Emmerdale, portrayed by Jason Merrells. He was introduced on 15 April 2010. The Emmerdale website has described the character by saying "Declan is a shrewd businessman who knows exactly what he wants and how to get it. He's prepared to be unpopular if it's good for business and the people in the village recognise his confidence. He does have a softer side but is not the most attentive husband in the world." In September 2014, Merrells confirmed he had left the show. Declan made his final appearance on 13 October 2014 after exposing the crimes that he committed with his wife, Charity Dingle (Emma Atkins); she framed her cousin Sam (James Hooton) and his girlfriend Rachel Breckle (Gemma Oaten) for starting a fire at Home Farm – which Declan was responsible for during his suicide attempt after becoming on the verge of financial bankruptcy – before causing the events of Declan embarking on a monthly insurance fraud.

== Casting ==
In January 2010, it was announced that former Waterloo Road star Jason Merrells would be joining the cast of Emmerdale as Natasha Wylde's new love interest. When Amanda Donohoe (who played Natasha) quit the role, Declan became the new owner of Home Farm. In mid-2010, it was announced that a new dynasty would hit Home Farm. The clan included Declan's ex-wife Ella, their daughter Mia, and his father, Dermot. However, they departed in 2011 after the characters were axed by series producer, Stuart Blackburn. It was announced in October, 2011, that Gaynor Faye had joined the cast as Megan Macey, Declan's half-sister.

On 29 September 2014, Merrells announced that he had quit Emmerdale in order to spend more time with his family. Of his departure, Merrells commented "it was never going to be a job for life and I've stayed way longer than I thought I would."

== Storylines ==
While he is at a hotel, Declan meets Charity Dingle (Emma Atkins) - who flirts with him and then steals his car. Declan later spots Charity in The Woolpack and blackmails her into going on a date with him. Declan kisses Charity to make her cousin Cain Dingle (Jeff Hordley) jealous, as he is already aware that Cain is Charity's boyfriend. Declan buys a share in Home Farm from Natasha Wylde (Amanda Donohoe), unaware it is her son Nathan's (Lyndon Ogbourne) share, which he demands back. Declan and Natasha begin a secret relationship and Declan buys a house in the village. When the body of Natasha's husband Mark (Maxwell Caulfield) is found, Natasha's daughter Maisie (Alice Coulthard) tells Declan she thinks Nathan killed their father. Declan confronts Natasha, believing she is covering for Nathan, and offers to help. Natasha insists that Nathan is not responsible and Declan ends their relationship. Declan employs Nicola King (Nicola Wheeler) as his estate manager. He offers to help Faye Lamb (Kim Thomson) contest Mark's will in order to take over the estate and supports her when her son Ryan (James Sutton) is accused of Mark's murder.

Declan gets a call from his ex-wife in Singapore telling him that his daughter has been injured in a road accident and he flies out to visit her. On his return, Declan comforts Faye when Ryan is found guilty of murdering Mark. Natasha confesses to Mark's murder and Declan makes Nathan an offer for her share of Home Farm. Nathan refuses and later sells to Ella Hart (Corrinne Wicks), unaware that she is Declan's wife. Much to Declan's annoyance, Ella makes herself at home. Declan and Ella's daughter Mia (Sapphire Elia) later find Declan with Alicia Gallagher (Natalie Anderson). Declan's father Dermot Macey (Frank Kelly) arrives for Christmas at Ella's invitation. Declan pays Dermot not to stay, but he later finds his father at Home Farm with Ella and Mia. When Declan discovers Ella is having an affair with Mia's boyfriend, Adam Barton (Adam Thomas), he throws her out, but promises not to tell Mia. Declan starts dating Katie Sugden (Sammy Winward) and Ella tries to warn her off. Declan accidentally tells Mia about Adam and Ella's affair. Before Ella leaves, she tells Declan that his friend Jai Sharma (Chris Bisson) is Mia's father. Declan confronts Jai and tells him to stay away from Mia. Declan later asks Dermot to take Mia back to Ireland.

Katie encourages Declan to get in touch with Mia and he invites her to visit. However, on the day she is due to arrive, Declan is told that Mia has died in a car accident. He breaks down and begins ignoring Katie. Katie believes they should end their relationship, but Declan proposes. She turns him down, but agrees to move in with him. Declan and Katie come across John (James Thornton) and Moira Barton (Natalie J. Robb) after a serious car accident. Declan rescues Moira, but the car falls from the cliff and crashes to the ground with John still inside. John is rescued and taken to hospital, but dies that evening. Declan pays his respects to Moira and then asks if he can use their field for a music festival. Adam overhears the conversation and tells him to leave. Declan's sister, Megan (Gaynor Faye), arrives in the village and helps Declan with the music festival. Megan and Katie clash numerous times. Megan admits that she gave a child up for adoption and Declan finds her son, Robbie Lawson (Jamie Shelton). Katie shows Declan CCTV footage of Robbie trying to kiss her. Megan suspects Katie made it up and blackmails Declan into letting Robbie stay, causing Katie to move out. Declan apologises and he proposes again, which Katie accepts.

Declan tells Katie that he plans to keep the proceeds from the festival. Declan and Katie marry. Shortly after the couple argue, and Katie falls into a disused mine. She is later found by Sam Dingle (James Hooton) on the moors in a critical condition. Katie recovers, but a shattered pelvis temporarily confines her to a wheelchair and further damage means that her chances of her having any more children are minimal. When Katie recalls her argument with Declan, she decides to leave. Declan has a one-night stand with Charity, but when Katie comes back, she and Declan reconcile. However, Charity's cousin Chas (Lucy Pargeter) learns about his one-night stand with Charity and tells Katie. She then publicly humiliates Declan and has a one-night stand with Adam, making sure Declan catches them. Declan and Katie clash several times, and they begin divorce proceedings. During excavation for the music festival, bone are discovered on the land, but Declan pays the crew to keep going with the work.

The police tell Declan that the bones are in fact the remains of Alex Moss (Kurtis Stacey). When a worker tells the police that Declan paid him to keep his mouth shut and continue working, Declan is arrested for perverting the course of justice and later on suspicion of murder - as the police now suspect that Declan killed Alex. Once he is released and Alex's fate becomes public knowledge, Declan's public image is questioned when he puts all the local houses on sale. This infuriates the villagers, particularly when Declan visits Moira to increase her debts - leaving her devastated, much to Cain and Adam's frustration. Declan's conflict with Cain and the Barton family is soon exploited by Chas' ex-fiancé, Cameron Murray (Dominic Power) - who, unbeknownst to the villagers, was the one who killed Alex on Christmas Eve 2012. Cameron manipulates Adam, who was previously Alex's best-friend, into believing that Declan killed Alex and has been badmouthing John to spite him over his relationship with Katie. As Declan heads to the pub with Megan to discuss their situation with the villagers, Adam confronts him over and they again argue in front of Cameron. When Declan tells Adam to blame his father for the situation that he and Moira are in, Adam punches Declan - prompting Andy to separate them and the police to arrest Adam, as they have witnessed the incident. Cameron soon proceeds to frame Adam for Alex's murder, and his actions leave some villagers convinced that Adam is guilty whilst others - particularly Cain and Moira - suspect that Declan is the one implicating Adam. When Cain confronts Declan about Adam's arrest, however, he grudgingly realizes that Declan had nothing to do with Alex's murder - since Declan barely knew Alex in the first place - and nor did he frame Adam for the murder. Though Cain and Moira are forced to accept that Declan wasn't involved with Alex's murder, Adam is unable to accept this and ends up going on the run. He soon returns, however, when Cameron is eventually exposed as Alex's murderer; the villagers discover this after learning that Cameron had also killed his love rival Carl King (Tom Lister) and Chas' half-sister Genesis Walker (Sian Reese-Williams). When Cameron later holds the pub hostage during a torrential rain, Declan offers the villagers sanctuary at Home Farm - which they accept up until the siege has ended and Cameron dies after electrocuting himself. Following Cameron's death, Declan resumes his debt settlement on Moira - prompting Cain to steal his cars and use them to repay Declan the money to clear Moira's debt. Declan is aware that Cain stole his cars, but is forced to accept his payment at Megan's insistence. Declan soon began physically abusing Megan. Katie witnesses one of Declan's attacks and sticks up for Megan, despite Megan saying that it was just a misunderstanding.

One night when Charity takes Declan home, he douses the living room with petrol. Charity tries to stop him, but he sets the room on fire in a bid to end his life. However, he changes his mind and flees the scene with Charity. They later learn Megan was in the house, but that she was rescued by the fire brigade. Looking for a way out of the damage Declan has caused, he and Charity decide to create a scam so they can claim the insurance money, leading to framing Sam and his girlfriend Rachel Breckle (Gemma Oaten) for the crime. Charity then forces Rachel to take her son and leave the village. Declan and Charity soon begin a relationship, but Charity is horrified when she becomes pregnant. When she tells Declan, he is delighted, and proposes. Although she initially refuses and walks out, she later changes her mind and accepts.

Their wedding follows weeks later, but is interrupted when Megan, who hates Charity, sets off the fire alarm and hides the rings in an attempt to halt things going ahead. After Charity confronts her, they fight, which Declan breaks up, but they still marry, Megan forced to lend Charity one of her rings. During a second argument with Megan, Charity falls when Megan grabs her and later lies to Declan that she has had a miscarriage. He is devastated the hospital staff confirm she has lost the baby. A guilt-ridden Megan admits that she is to blame, leading to Declan forcing her out of the house. Incensed, Megan vows revenge on Charity, and takes the chance when Robbie finds an address to the abortion clinic on the sat nav. They try to convince Declan that Charity had an abortion, but he refuses to believe her, while Charity manages to come up with an excuse by telling Declan that her daughter Debbie (Charley Webb) had the abortion. When her son Noah (Jack Downham) takes a bottle of wine, he collapses and is taken to hospital, where it is revealed that the drink was laced with pesticide. A suspicious Declan begins to doubt Charity, but stands by her when she accuses Megan of trying to poison her, because of their long-running feud. Worried for her health, Declan persuades Charity to go away to a cottage for a break. Whilst his behaviour begins to unnerve Charity, she remains otherwise oblivious.

He puts the pesticide container into the boot of his car when Charity is inside, revealing that he was involved in the poisoning. He takes her phone and smashes it in the woods, and calls Megan to tell her that he believes her about Charity's abortion. When Megan begs him to come home, he darkly tells her everything is going to be alright, but his unhinged temperament insinuates that he is going to kill Charity. Charity, who has followed him, overhears the conversation and returns to the cottage, but is seen by him. She is horrified when the car does not start, and begins to panic. Declan comes back and locks the door, but coerces her into coming onto a boat trip. He goes to the kitchen to find wine, but when Charity approaches him with an axe from behind, he turns around and manages to knock her unconscious with a meat mallet. He places her body in the boot of his car, intending to bury her body in the woods. After calling Debbie to tell her that she has gone missing, Declan opens the boot, but Charity has come around, kicks him and escapes. He follows her through the woods and eventually catches her, where she begs for her life, telling him they can get a divorce. Declan ignores her, before revealing he was responsible for trying to poison the wine, although he adds he never meant for Noah to get hurt. He attempts to kill her again, but Charity knocks him into a shallow grave he dug for her and flees. She finds a boat by the lake, but Declan swims out to her. Charity tries to defend herself with a flare gun, but Declan tries to grab it from her, and Megan and Robbie show up to find them fighting. Declan manages to get the flare gun and aims it at Charity, but Robbie swims out in an attempt to save her, and Declan hits him with the flare, killing him. He tries to find Robbie under the lake but cannot find him. Determined to finish what he started, he tries to pull Charity into the water with him, but she hits Declan with an anchor. Although only attempting to protect herself, his body sinks under the water.

The police later arrive and locate Robbie's body, leaving Megan devastated, but reveal Declan remains missing. An enraged Megan tells Charity to watch her back, as he might be alive, leaving her frightened. When the search is abandoned after no other body turns up, Megan is forced to admit her brother is gone. When Charity offers her Robbie's things, there is a moment of peace, where they talk about Declan, but it becomes apparent Megan hates her more than ever.

On the day of Robbie's funeral, Declan reappears alive having sneaked into Home Farm, where he drugs Charity's drink; she passes out. Using Charity's phone, he sends a text inviting Debbie, Sam, Jai, Cain, Chas, Zak Dingle (Steve Halliwell), Leyla Harding (Roxy Shahidi) and Ashley Thomas (John Middleton) to the house. He makes his appearance apparently holding Megan and everyone (including Dan when he forces him to) hostage, where he reveals the truth about stitching Rachel up for the house fire and for the crimes that Charity had committed. He makes a quick exit from the house, showing Megan that the gun was fake and that he would never hurt her. He apologises for everything and kisses her goodbye, before fleeing with Sam, Cain, and Jai in hot pursuit. He flees in a car as Declan divorces from Charity off-screen in 2015.

== Reception ==
Since his arrival, Declan has been popular with villagers for his personality and charm. Emmerdaily have said that Declan is a character that "knows exactly what he wants and how he is going to get it", whilst others called him as a "fun" character, but an "extremely powerful" one as well who expects the best of all his workers and also expects everything to go his way. The official Emmerdale website states, "Declan is a shrewd businessman who knows exactly what he wants and how to get it. He's prepared to be unpopular if it's good for business and the people in the village recognise his confidence. He does have a softer side but is not the most attentive husband in the world."

== See also ==
- List of Emmerdale characters (2010)
- List of soap opera villains
