= List of Emmerdale characters introduced in 2009 =

The following is a list of characters who first appeared in the British soap opera Emmerdale in 2009, by order of first appearance. Characters until March were introduced by executive producer Keith Richardson, with Steve Frost taking over as his successor from 16 March 2009.

== Tanya Callard ==
Tanya Callard
- Emmerdale character
- Portrayed by: Susan McArdle
- Duration: 2009, 2011
- First appearance: 12 February 2009
- Last appearance: 21 April 2011
- Introduced by: Keith Richardson

Tanya Callard was Debbie Dingle's cellmate. She appeared in 2009 whilst Debbie was on remand accused of the murder of policeman Shane Doyle.

Tanya first appears on the day Debbie goes to court to hear what she is to be prosecuted for. When Debbie returns, having been told she will be tried for murder, Tanya asks her what happened, and Debbie tells her to mind her own business. A few days later, Tanya discovers a mobile phone given to Debbie by her solicitor and she refuses to give it to Debbie and stamps on it.

Tanya appears again on 21 April 2011, when Debbie's mother Charity Tate, arranges for her to go on a date with Nikhil Sharma. Charity reveals that Tanya now works as a sweet packer, implying that she now works for the Sharmas who run a confectioners. Tanya meets up with Nikhil, Charity and Nikhil's brother Jai in The Woolpack and is served by barman Bob Hope. During her appearance, Tanya and Debbie do not encounter each other and Charity seems unaware of Tanya's connection to her daughter.

== Will Wylde ==
Will Wylde
- Emmerdale character
- Portrayed by: Oscar Lloyd
- Duration: 2009–2011
- First appearance: 16 February 2009
- Last appearance: 12 January 2011
- Introduced by: Keith Richardson
In-universe information
- Father: Mark Wylde
- Mother: Natasha Wylde
- Brothers: Nathan Wylde
- Sisters: Maisie Wylde
- Half-brothers: Ryan Lamb

Will Wylde is the younger son of Mark and Natasha Wylde.

Will arrives in Emmerdale in February 2009, a month after his parents have bought Home Farm. He leaves his school, where he had few friends, and soon makes friends with Belle Dingle after meeting her in the grounds and become good friends. He moves to a nearby private school and is bullied when he and his family appear in Horse and Hound magazine. After his parents worry about Belle's influence is having on Will and ban him from going to a "Emmerdale Explorers" sleepover. The following morning, he goes missing. The police investigate, but Will is found by Jimmy King hiding behind a bush in the estate grounds. In August 2009, Will is kicked by a horse and is rushed to hospital where he makes a full recovery. Ryan Lamb, who unbeknownst to Will was his half-brother, saves him and Will likes him, much to his mother's horror, as Natasha knew the truth about Ryan.

In January 2010, Natasha tells Will that Mark was married to Ryan's mother Faye Lamb and that Ryan is his half-brother. Will is traumatized but still believes his father will come back. Will attempts to bond with Ryan but his brother, Nathan, forbids him from doing so. In June, Cain Dingle, Belle's half-brother, tries blackmailing the Wyldes and when Natasha refuses to pay him, Will goes missing. Natasha believes that Cain has abducted Will but they later find him in the cafe. Cain had picked Will and Belle up from school and bought them ice creams.

In July, Will is devastated when his father's body is found on the estate grounds. Will is questioned by the police about when he last saw his father and a DNA sample is taken from the family members. When Nathan is arrested, Will believes he is Mark's killer and tells him that he hates him but Nathan convinces him of his innocence. Will is shocked when Ryan is wrongfully arrested and wrongfully charged with the murder. During Ryan's trial, Natasha sends Will to stay with a family friend. In October, Will finds out that Natasha killed Mark after Cain drives him and Natasha to a barn where he was confronting Nathan. Natasha told Will to stay outside and to stop Maisie torturing Nathan to make him tell her the truth, Natasha confesses but Will overhears and despite Natasha telling him that she loves him, Will responds that he does not want her to love him, he wants his father back. After Natasha is arrested, he stays with Maisie and Nathan at Home Farm until November, when he and Maisie find out that Nathan framed Ryan. Will is disgusted with Nathan's lies and he and Maisie move into Holdgate Farm with Maisie's former boyfriend Nikhil Sharma, rejecting Nathan. Maisie and Ryan later tell Nathan to stay away from her and Will. Nikhil and Maisie grow close much to Will's discomfort. Nikhil attempts to befriend Will and buys him gifts but Will rejects them. Nikhil later gives Will a letter from Natasha but Will loses his temper and tears it up saying that he never wants to hear from his mother again. Nathan later tries to call Will on his mobile phone and he breaks it in order to stop him. Nikhil then proposes to Maisie and she later accepts, wanting to give Will some stability but Will is angry and loses his temper with Belle when she tries to comfort him. He later speaks to Ryan and suggests that they be a family together and tells him that Maisie would want that but Ryan refuses, due to him and Maisie nearly sleeping together before they discovered that they were siblings.

On 11 January 2011, Will sits in the front seat of the Home Farm Land Rover and when Maisie goes to speak to him he reminisces about their father and asks Maisie why Natasha killed him. Later that evening, Maisie and Nikhil hold their engagement party at Home Farm and Nikhil tries to encourage him but Will loses his temper and shouts at Nikhil and bursts into tears.

After Maisie tells Nikhil that she does not love him and breaks off their engagement, she decides that she and Will should leave Emmerdale and decide to go and stay with their Aunt in Dartford. Will goes to say goodbye to Belle and gives her a games console as a farewell present. She gives him a kiss on the cheek and he leaves. As they prepare to depart, Ryan comes to say goodbye and tells Will to call him whenever he wants. As Will and Maisie leave in their taxi, Belle runs up and shouts to Will that she loves him and he shouts back that he feels the same way about her. Their taxi drives away, taking Will and Maisie to the railway station.

== Lizzie Lakely ==
Elizabeth "Lizzie" Lakely was introduced as the first blind character in the soap opera. She is played by Kitty McGeever, and was later introduced as the cousin of established character, Lisa Dingle (Jane Cox), who made her first appearance back in 1996. Lizzie's first on-screen appearance aired on 28 April 2009, and in 2011, Lizzie was devastated to learn that her love interest, Derek Benrose (Stephen Bent), had raped her cousin Lisa. Lizzie's last on-screen appearance was on 28 March 2013, but it is unknown whether the character is returning to the soap. McGeever died on 16 August 2015.

== Eddy Fox ==
Eddy Fox
- Emmerdale character
- Portrayed by: Paul Darrow
- First appearance: 13 July 2009
- Last appearance: 3 August 2009
- Introduced by: Steve Frost
In-universe information
- Occupation: Roadie

Eddy Fox is an old friend of Alan Turner (Richard Thorp). He is played by Paul Darrow, whose casting was announced on 23 May 2009. Upon casting, Darrow told The Sun: "I am delighted to be appearing in Emmerdale. My character Eddy's going to be great fun to play. I'll get to ride around the Dales on my trike in my leathers. I'll be like Marlon Brando." Darrow also revealed that he had worked with Thorp before: "I'm also really looking forward to catching up with my old pal Richard Thorp. We used to work together way back on Emergency Ward 10."

Eddy arrives in the village looking for Alan, whom he befriended through their mutual love for motorcycles and whom he has not seen for many years. He tells Alan that he is about to start a new life travelling the world on his motorbike and asks Alan to come with him. Alan accepts, but later decides not to after speaking to Edna Birch (Shirley Stelfox). Edna's sister, Lily Butterfield (Anne Charleston), soon gets on well with him and she decides to go travelling with him. They leave the village together on 3 August.

== Michael Conway ==
Michael Conway
- Emmerdale character
- Portrayed by: Jamie Belman
- First appearance: 13 July 2009
- Last appearance: 1 October 2009
- Introduced by: Steve Frost
In-universe information
- Occupation: Supplier
- Father: Mr Conway
- Brothers: Ian Conway

Michael Conway is a supplier to the Home Farm shop, appearing between July and October 2009.

Michael first appears when visiting the shop to check the fridges he supplied are working properly. He lives in Durham. Later that day, he talks to Debbie Dingle (Charley Webb) in the cafe, and tries to chat her up. The following day, he takes his car to her garage, and they go out to lunch. He is surprised to discover that she is a single mother but introduces himself to her daughter Sarah (Sophia Amber Moore) when he sees her and Debbie going to play group. He asks Debbie out again but she says she has too much going on.

In early August, they begin dating and in early September, Michael admits that he has a girlfriend but still wants to see Debbie. Debbie agrees, providing she knows nothing about his other woman. However, later during a heated argument, Michael admits that he is engaged to the other woman. Debbie insists Michael choose—her or his fiancée so Michael chooses her. Debbie's father, Cain Dingle (Jeff Hordley) does not trust Michael and is proved right when he sees a text from the best man and it is revealed that he has not called off the wedding. Cain beats Michael up, warning him to stay away from Debbie but he returns, regardless, and tells Debbie that he was too scared to admit that he had not called the wedding off as the ceremony is the next day. His reason for not cancelling is that his fiancée is pregnant and he felt unable to abandon his child.

Debbie and Cain go to the wedding and discover he is marrying Debbie's mother, Charity Tate (Emma Atkins). They tell Charity about Michael's affair and tell Michael that Debbie is Charity's daughter, shocking them both. Charity and Michael initially agree to go ahead but Michael calls it off on discovering Charity is not pregnant. Michael later phones Debbie repeatedly but she does not take his calls, busy rebuilding her relationship with Charity and getting to know Noah.

== John Barton ==
John Barton, played by James Thornton, made his first on screen appearance on 17 July 2009. The casting and character was announced in May 2009. John and his family are part of a new farming dynasty, who took over running Butler's Farm from the Sugden family. Speaking of his new role, Thornton said "John is great because he is a farmer, a proper bloke. He is hard working and quite moral—a really good character." On 28 November 2011, it was announced Thornton had decided to leave Emmerdale. Of his decision to leave, Thornton said "I have had a fantastic time playing John for the past three years, but it's the longest I have ever played one part and the time now feels right to move on. I have decided to leave on a high with a big exit storyline in 2012, which I'm really excited about. I will miss all my colleagues at Emmerdale and have many very fond memories of my time in the Dales."

== Moira Barton ==
Moira Barton, played by Natalie J. Robb, made her first on screen appearance on 17 July 2009. Robb's agent asked her to audition for the role of Moira. The actress auditioned alongside several different actors, including James Thornton, who was eventually cast as Moira's husband, John. The Yorkshire Post describe Moria as "Fun-loving and feisty" and they said it was guaranteed she would cause a stir with the locals.

== Adam Barton ==
Adam Barton, played by Adam Thomas, made his first on-screen appearance on 17 July 2009. Jake Roche auditioned for the role of Adam, however, it was actor Adam Thomas who was eventually cast. Of his character, Thomas said "Adam's a family man... Whatever his dad says, he does. The whole family is really close. Even with his sisters, he's the middle child but he wants to be the older brother and look after them all."

== Holly Barton ==
Holly Barton, played by Sophie Powles, made her first on screen appearance on 17 July 2009. Powles attended an audition and several call backs for the role of Holly. Following a screen test, she was told she has won the part. Powles had to dye her hair brown for the role. Holly is described as being a "free spirit with a sense of adventure." Powles opined Holly is "the kind of girl who will get on with anybody."

== Matty Barton ==
Matty Barton
- Emmerdale character
- Portrayed by: Grace Cassidy (2009–2012); Ash Palmisciano (2018–present)
- Duration: 2009–2012, 2018–present
- First appearance: Episode 5350; 17 July 2009
- Introduced by: Steve Frost (2009); Jane Hudson (2018)
In-universe information
- Other names: Hannah Barton
- Occupation: Student; Shop assistant Farm hand Barman; Furniture restorer
- Father: John Barton
- Mother: Moira Dingle
- Stepfather: Cain Dingle
- Sisters: Holly Barton
- Half-brothers: Isaac Dingle; Adam Barton
- Wife: Amy Wyatt (2024–2025)
- Stepsons: Kyle Dingle
- Uncles: James Barton; Mackenzie Boyd
- First cousins: Reuben Harris; Pete Barton; Ross Barton; Finn Barton
- Other relatives: Moses Dingle; Layla Sugden

Matty Barton (formerly Hannah Barton) made his debut screen appearance on 17 July 2009. The character was originally played by Grace Cassidy. Matty is the youngest child of John (James Thornton) and Moira Barton (Natalie J. Robb). On 28 April 2012, Cassidy confirmed her departure from Emmerdale. Of her decision to leave, Cassidy said "Working on Emmerdale has been one of the best periods of my life. After three years I have made so many friends here and I am going to miss them so much. However, I felt the time was right to move on as I still have so much to learn. I can't thank Stuart and the team enough for making me feel so welcome. I will never forget the opportunity I was given."

On 7 June 2018, it was announced that the character would be returning, with trans actor Ash Palmisciano in the role. The character is now known as Matty Barton, having transitioned in his years away from the village. Of joining the show, Palmisciano stated "I'm very excited to be joining the very welcoming Emmerdale family. From nervous auditions to now working alongside the team daily has been truly amazing. Matty's a groundbreaking character to play and I can't wait to see what's ahead for him." For his portrayal of Matty, Palmisciano was nominated for Best Soap Newcomer at the 2018 Digital Spy Reader Awards; he came in fourth place with 13% of the total votes.

Matty (then Hannah) arrives in the village with his family, who have purchased the Sugdens' former farm. He soon develops a crush on Andy Sugden (Kelvin Fletcher), but he rejects him, saying Matty is too young for him. It is revealed that he is being bullied via text, however he hides this from his family who have failed to realise that he is having trouble settling in, the texts he is receiving are from his classmate Kayleigh Gibbs. Matty confides in Victoria Sugden (Isabel Hodgins), who is aware of the texts as she has been forced into sending some herself. Eventually Matty confronts Victoria in The Woolpack toilets, and is hurt when Victoria admits she and Kayleigh have been sending the texts. As result to this Matty flushes Victoria's head down the toilet. After the fight is broken up Matty reveals he is being bullied. Months later Matty forgives Victoria and the two become friends again. Matty starts a relationship with Isaac Nuttall (Jake Roche), a student. Feeling under pressure Matty sleeps with Isaac, but is mortified to discover their contraception had failed. Because of this and his sister Holly Barton's (Sophie Powles) drug problem, they break up.

New farmhand Alex Moss (Kurtis Stacey) is immediately attracted to Matty, and they have sex, but Alex deserts him the next day. Alex later turns his attention to Victoria and they start a relationship, much to Matty's disappointment and jealousy. Victoria becomes suspicious of Alex and Matty's behaviour and Alex admits that he seduced Matty and then dumped him, but Matty gives Victoria and Alex his blessing and the two continue their relationship. After his father's death, Matty begins to work more on the farm, at the same time slipping behind with his college work. It is later revealed that he failed to turn up to some of his A-level exams. When Holly goes to live in London with her friend Roz Fielding (Kirsty-Leigh Porter), Matty decides he had had enough of life in Emmerdale and the bad memories there, and goes with Holly to start afresh in London.

Six years later, Matty returns to Emmerdale having transitioned to male during his time away. He breaks into Butler's farm in order to steal back his birth certificate, however he is caught by Cain Dingle before he is able to leave. When Moira returns home, she is shocked to discover that her child is now identifying as male, and has changed his name to Matty. Later, Victoria is horrified to find that a man has broken into her Diddy Diner truck, and even more so when the culprit knows her. She is shocked but pleased when the man turns out to be Matty Barton. Matty reveals that Moira was unaccepting about the change and threw him out. Victoria tries to convince Matty that he should give Moira a second chance as she's bound to be shocked, but the pair are disgusted when they walk into Butler's Farm to hear Moira insulting Matty. Matty makes the decision to return to Manchester, despite Victoria's offers to allow him to stay with her. She drops Matty off at the train station when Cain fails to convince him to stay. After being mugged and hospitalised, Matty decides to come back and stay with his mum at Butler's farm.

== Angelica King ==
Angelica King
- Emmerdale character
- Portrayed by: Sophie Firth (2009); Rebecca Bakes (2009–present)
- Duration: 2009–present
- First appearance: 6 August 2009
- Introduced by: Steve Frost
In-universe information
- Father: Jimmy King
- Mother: Nicola King
- Half-brothers: Elliot Windsor; Carl Holliday
- Grandfathers: Tom King; Rodney Blackstock
- Grandmothers: Mary King; Maureen Blackstock
- Uncles: Carl King; Matthew King; Max King; Paul Lambert
- Aunts: Bernice Blackstock; Scarlett Nicholls
- First cousins: Thomas King; Anya King; Gabby Thomas; Dee Dee
- Other relatives: Thomas Tate

Angelica King is the daughter of Jimmy (Nick Miles) and Nicola King (Nicola Wheeler). She first appeared in August 2009. The character was initially portrayed by Sophie Firth, who died after her dress caught fire at her grandmother's house. She suffered from severe burns and later died in hospital from the injuries.

Angelica is born in August 2009 and is taken to the special baby unit because of breathing difficulties. She is given the all-clear twenty-four hours later. She is kidnapped by Lexi Nicholls but soon returned after Jimmy, Nicola, Jimmy's brother and Lexi's ex-husband Carl King (Tom Lister) and Jimmy's sister Scarlett Nicholls (Kelsey-Beth Crossley) find Lexi and Angelica on the hospital roof.

Angelica is pushed into the middle of the road, a few days before her christening, by Sally Spode (Siân Reeves) due to Laurel Thomas (Charlotte Bellamy) being Angelica's godmother. Nicola immediately blames Carl's children, Thomas King and Anya King, for taking her for a walk but Gennie Walker (Sian Reese-Williams) and her boyfriend Nikhil Sharma (Rik Makarem) find her, much to Sally's displeasure. Angelica's christening was nearly a disaster as Jimmy is away on a work trip and returned late due to the van breaking down. Carl missed it as he stayed with the van so Jimmy could get to the christening. Carl still becomes Angelica's godfather and swears to do anything for Angelica and treat her how he should treat Thomas and Anya. When Angelica is at Kids Klub with Nicola, she is bitten by Cathy Hope. Nicola then bit Cathy to show her how it felt to be bitten. Cathy's mother Viv Hope (Deena Payne) then takes Nicola to court for Cathy's assault. Nicola is given a caution and the same day she and Jimmy marry.

The character was at the centre of her biggest storyline to date in 2024 when it transpires that she is responsible for the death of Heath Hope (Sebastian Dowling) in a road crash. She was charged for dangerous driving and was sent to a secure children's facility.

== Sally Spode ==
Sally Spode
- Emmerdale character
- Portrayed by: Siân Reeves
- Duration: 2009–2010
- First appearance: 27 August 2009
- Last appearance: 2 April 2010
- Introduced by: Steve Frost
In-universe information
- Husband: Vincent Spode

Sally Spode, played by Siân Reeves, made her first on-screen appearance on 27 August 2009. The character was introduced as an 'old love interest' of established character Ashley Thomas (John Middleton), and as the story progressed it was transpired that Sally was in fact deceitful and conniving. In October 2009, Sally moved into the village with deadly intentions as it was soon revealed that Sally had planned to kill his wife Laurel (Charlotte Bellamy) and regain Ashley's love. The character departed the soap at the end of Reeves' six-month stint, where the character was sectioned under the mental health act after being arrested for her crimes. Reeves was nominated for Villain of the Year at The British Soap Awards 2010 for her portrayal of Sally.

Sally, a vicar's wife, first appears in August 2009. An ex-girlfriend of Rev. Ashley Thomas (John Middleton), he is surprised to see Sally married to Vincent Spode, a fellow vicar and Ashley's one-time rival. She reveals that she and Vincent have recently returned from doing conservation work in Mozambique. Sally does not like her husband's boasting and his rivalry with Ashley. At the cricket match, suggested by the Bishop, Vincent's team wins.

Sally later arrived in Emmerdale, revealing she had left her husband and moved in with Ashley and Laurel (Charlotte Bellamy). After a few days, however, Laurel contacted Vincent—hoping to get the couple back together. Vincent arrived and confronted his wife who claimed he abused her. Angry, Vincent lashed out at Ashley, proving that he can be violent. Sally refused to call the police, claiming, apart from her, all he had was the church. She said if she did, he will lose that. The same day, she decided to leave, believing she was causing trouble between Ashley and Laurel. They reassured her and convinced her to stay, saying they would protect her if Vincent came looking for her again. It later emerged Sally was lying about the violence as a way of getting closer to Ashley.

On 5 November, Sally watched as an ember from the bonfire set fire to Laurel's coat, only springing into action when she saw Marlon Dingle (Mark Charnock) approaching. Sally appeared the hero when she threw her coat onto the flames. Laurel was fine but her coat was ruined. A week later, after an argument with Laurel in the church, Sally pushed a heater up against a curtain then locked Laurel in. The heater set fire to the curtain and it soon spread. Laurel could not get out as the doors were locked. Ashley raised the alarm and rescued her, rushing her to hospital with smoke inhalation. When she was sleeping, after being discharged, Sally was considering smothering her with a cushion until Nicola King (Nicola Wheeler) knocked on the door. Laurel's suspicion of Sally grew in early December when she started piecing together details of the fire and did not remember locking the door or moving the heater so close to the curtain. She told Nicola what she suspected, the police and Ashley. Only Nicola believed her, but Ashley blamed her state of mind on the trauma of surviving the fire. On Sally's advice, Ashley contacted a psychiatrist but Laurel threw Sally out. Later that night, Sally virtually admitted the truth so Laurel gave Ashley an ultimatum—either Sally left or she did. Laurel was relieved when she left but was furious when Ashley said Sally had only gone to Edna Birch's (Shirley Stelfox) house. This was not good enough so she packed her bags and left the village, with Gabby and Arthur. Gabby returned during the week for school.

Ashley clashed with Laurel's dad, Douglas Potts (Duncan Preston), over the incident. Sally stayed with Edna. Later, Sally made a pass at Ashley and jumped out in front of his car when he decided to leave the village. Having been knocked down, she was visited by Edna and told her that she and Ashley had been sleeping together. On 27 January 2010, Ashley and Edna realised that Sally had been lying and Ashley threatened to kill Sally if she did not leave voluntarily. Later that day, Terry Woods (Billy Hartman) informed Ashley that Sally has left but he and Edna were shocked to find his house wrecked with "burn in hell" painted on the wall but Ashley fears that it may be too late to save his marriage.

After stalking Ashley and Laurel in the village for a few weeks, kidnapping Edna's dog, Tootsie, and Angelica King and denting Diane Sugden's (Elizabeth Estensen) car when Doug was driving it. Later, in the church, she overheard Ashley and Laurel discussing her going away for a night, so she tricked Ashley into believing her sob-story but drugged Ashley and got him into bed. Ashley tells Laurel what Sally had done and they reported Sally to the police. The next day, Viv Hope (Deena Payne) tells Laurel that she saw Sally outside the cash and carry, going into a flat. Laurel immediately went there and confronts Sally. Sally has put up pictures of Ashley on the wall. Sally insists that Ashley loves her, not Laurel. She also tells her that she is pregnant with Ashley's child and that she was the one who started the church fire in which Laurel was almost killed. A fight then ensues, resulting in Laurel holding Sally over the balcony, telling her she is going to push her off. As Ashley, Doug, and the police then arrive, Laurel then tells Sally that it would make her as bad as she was if she pushed her off, so drags Sally back over the balcony. Ashley and Doug are relieved that Laurel is alright, while Sally is arrested. It is later revealed by Ashley that Sally was sectioned and declared mentally ill.

== Priya Sharma ==
Priya Sharma, played by Effie Woods, made her first screen appearance on 14 September 2009. The character departed in 2010, but returned the following year with Fiona Wade in the role. Priya is the younger sister of Jai (Chris Bisson) and Nikhil Sharma (Rik Makarem). She is a pretty, confident and outspoken woman. Priya has embarked on a casual fling with Cain Dingle (Jeff Hordley) and a relationship with David Metcalfe (Matthew Wolfenden) during her time in the village.

== Olena Petrovich ==
Olena Petrovich
- Emmerdale character
- Portrayed by: Carolin Stoltz
- Duration: 2009–2010
- First appearance: 9 November 2009
- Last appearance: 13 April 2010
- Introduced by: Steve Frost
In-universe information
- Occupation: Cleaner and waitress
- Brothers: Kristian Petrovich
- Sons: Andre Petrovich

Olena Petrovich was introduced to Emmerdale in November 2009.

An illegal immigrant from Ukraine, she arrived in the village in the back of a haulage truck driven by Carl King (Tom Lister) and ran away, hiding in the Dingles' barn. She was found and befriended by Belle Dingle (Eden Taylor-Draper) and Will Wylde (Oscar Lloyd), whom she told that it was dangerous for anyone to know she was there. She later became friends with Sam Dingle (James Hooton) who tended to her injured leg and offered her shelter and protection as she explained she wanted to work to send money back to her young son in Ukraine. When Sam's father Zak Dingle (Steve Halliwell) and stepmother Lisa Dingle (Jane Cox) eventually discovered her, she was welcomed into the Dingle homestead and Sam got her a job working at the B&B for Eric Pollard (Chris Chittell). Recently, however, she seems to have become uncomfortable at Sam's romantic advances. When Wishing Well Cottage was destroyed, she moved in with Marlon Dingle (Mark Charnock), Eli Dingle (Joseph Gilgun) and Lizzie Lakely (Kitty McGeever). In early April, Sam proposes to Olena, which she says no to, because she does not have a passport. Later, Sam goes to Cain and asks him to help him get a fake passport for Olena. Zak soon learns about it and tells Olena to leave Sam alone and that when she gets her fake passport he wants her to leave the village. She and Eli soon realise that they have feelings for each other and share a kiss. Sam invites Olena to the Dingles' party celebrating Lisa's release from prison, which she accepts, but does not want to. Zak goes round to Tall Trees Cottage and tells her to stay away. When Olena does not come, Sam goes to look for her, and spots her and Eli kissing. Sam is heartbroken.

Later, the UK Border Agency arrive after receiving an anonymous tip-off that Terry and Eric are employing people illegally. Terry denies employing any illegal workers, saying Olena is Polish, which he believes. However, after one of the officers asks to see her passport, Olena admits to Terry that she is, in fact, not Polish, but Ukrainian, and does not have any papers.

Olena is led away and subsequently deported back to Ukraine. After an argument when Eli accuses Val (who had noticed that Olena's mother's address was in Ukraine and not Poland) and Brenda of reporting her to the Border Agency, Sam later confesses that he reported her out of anger.

Grace Dent of The Guardian was critical of Olena's exit. She stated "It took seven people in uniforms dragging her screaming into a police van, driving her over miles and miles of hills and dales and rolling nothingness to remind her that apparently "Britain is full".

== Other characters ==
Date(s)	Character	Actor	Circumstances
4–5 February	Skin	Greg Wood	Skin was introduced as a love interest for Leyla Harding (Roxy Shahidi). Leyla meets Skin while out in Hotten for the night with David Metcalfe (Matthew Wolfenden). David and Leyla get too drunk to drive, so Skin drives them back to Emmerdale. Skin goes to Leyla's house and tries to make a pass at her, but she turns him down. The next day, Skin steals some valuables from the house. Pearl Ladderbanks (Meg Johnson) sees him and David stops him. Skin is then arrested.
11 February – 5 March	Theo Hawkins	Tom Knight	Debbie Dingle's solicitor who arrives in Emmerdale after being appointed by Cain Dingle, who had been on the run since 2006, to represent Debbie as she is charged with the murder of PC Shane Doyle. Cain pays the solicitor with the money he went on the run with in 2006. The following day, he visits Debbie in prison and believes he has a strong case to clear her. He secretly gives Debbie her mobile, which she later uses to speak to Jasmine. Later, Theo tries to persuade Debbie to plead not guilty. However, Jasmine arrives in court and admits she murdered Shane. Days later, Jasmine is sentenced to four years for manslaughter while Debbie gets six months after pleading guilty to perverting the course of justice.
19 February	Tristan Foster	Andrew Thomas Jones	Tristan is the husband of Maisie Wylde (Alice Coulthard) and best friend to her brother, Nathan (Lyndon Ogbourne). Tristan arrives in the village, following a call from Natasha Wylde (Amanda Donohoe). Maisie tells Nathan that she is growing fed up of Tristan's precise and tidy behaviour. However, she changes her mind and says she will go home with Tristan. While they are driving out of the village, Maisie changes her mind and gets out the car, and Tristan drives away.
27–28 April	Trevor Bright	Carl Cieka	Trevor is Laurel Thomas' (Charlotte Bellamy) supervisor during her community service. Trevor is first seen when Laurel goes to pick up litter in Hotten as part of her sentence. They have a friendly relationship. The next day, Trevor greets Lizzie Lakely (Kitty McGeever), who is also doing community service, and he teases her about telling Laurel stories to play on her sympathy.
8–10 July	Andrew Appleyard	Patrick Bridgman	When Eric Pollard's (Chris Chittell) business starts to lose business, Eric appoints Andrew as liquidator. He does not tell his workers, who he tells that the company has gone bust and he is making nothing out of it.
27 August – 29 October	Vincent Spode	Antony Byrne	An old colleague and rival vicar of Ashley Thomas (John Middleton), who arrived along with his wife Sally Spode (Siân Reeves), having recently returned from conservation work in Mozambique. Vincent and Sally's marriage was later shown to be strained. Vincent had a short temper and lost it with Laurel Thomas (Charlotte Bellamy) at a dinner party. Sally soon went to Ashley and Laurel's, revealing that she had left Vincent. Shortly afterwards, Vincent arrived and confronted them, accidentally hitting Ashley. It is later revealed that Vincent has gone to a retreat in Wiltshire.
