= Mark Wylde =

Fictional character from Emmerdale

- Emmerdale character
- Portrayed by: Maxwell Caulfield
- Duration: 2009–2010
- First appearance: 15 January 2009
- Last appearance: 14 January 2010
- Created by: Anita Turner
In-universe information
- Other names: Daniel Lamb (real name)
- Occupation: Businessman
- Wife: Faye Lamb (until 2010); Natasha Wylde (void)
- Sons: Ryan Lamb; Nathan Wylde; Will Wylde
- Daughters: Maisie Wylde

Mark Wylde is a fictional character from the British television soap opera Emmerdale, played by Maxwell Caulfield. He made his first appearance during the episode on 15 January 2009. In early December 2009, it was announced that Caulfield had quit the show and that his character would be killed off. He made his last appearance on 14 January 2010.

== Casting ==
On 23 September 2008, it was announced that actors Amanda Donohoe and Maxwell Caulfield had joined the cast of Emmerdale as "a smart and savvy City couple". Kris Green of Digital Spy reported that Caulfield and Donohoe would be playing husband and wife Mark and Natasha Wylde. Caulfield said that the role was "just too tempting to turn down and I can't wait to start filming in the beautiful Yorkshire countryside. Mark's complexities will be an interesting addition to life in Emmerdale." Series producer Anita Turner stated that she was "thrilled" to welcome the actors to the cast and revealed that they would be the focus of some "gripping storylines next year." Caulfield and Donohoe started filming in October, and it was originally announced that they would make their debut on 25 December 2008, but this was later changed to 15 January 2009.

== Development ==
=== Characterisation ===
Mark and Natasha were initially billed as "an aspirational, wealthy and dynamic duo who have decided to exchange their high-flying City life for the idyllic rural surroundings of Yorkshire." Caulfield said that the Wyldes are "self-made millionaires, they're very well-to-do", and although not looking for early retirement, as they are "too dynamic and too driven for that", they do want a "break from the big city". Donohoe said that the couple have been married for 25 years and have two grown-up children and a nine-year old. Caulfield stated that there is a "hidden side to Mark that will come out over time". He called him an "out-and-out charmer" and one of those people whose "sincerity you have to question". He also likened his character to "an ambitious politician". Caulfield said Mark was "such a fun character to play". Talking about the Wylde's fictional backstory, Caulfield told Laura Davidson of the Sunday Mail that Mark and Natasha made their money from business and that Natasha always dreamt of moving from the city to the countryside. He also stated: "Along with this fabulous mansion they've bought, they've acquired quite a lot of holdings so basically they own most of Emmerdale village. Everyone is unnerved by their arrival. They don't know what's going to become of them because the Wyldes practically own the roofs over their heads."

=== Introduction and secret son ===
Inside Soap's Sarah Ellis noted that it was taking longer for Mark to settle into village life compared to his wife. While Natasha is seen meeting and befriending the local residents, Mark hardly leaves Home Farm following their introduction. In one of the character's early storylines, Natasha returns to find Mark moving furniture with "pretty" stable owner Katie Sugden (Sammy Winward) and becomes suspicious of them. Caulfield thought that the Wyldes were "the type of couple who like teasing each other with rival mates", but he pointed out that Katie was the same age as Mark's daughter. He also doubted his character was "a big-time philanderer" and said circumstances keep throwing him and Katie together, but Mark "certainly doesn't put the fire out". When Mark does go into the village alone, he becomes acquainted with the show's King brothers, who hope to rent Pear Tree Cottage from him. Ellis commented that Mark and Natasha actually bought Home Farm from the Kings, something that Caulfield said surprises Mark. He called it "a weird situation" and explained that Mark would rather not deal with the circumstances of how Home Farm came up for sale. He joked "The Wyldes hadn't done their research properly. They didn't realise what a nest of vipers Emmerdale is!" Mark is later seen trying to dig up dirt on Jimmy King (Nick Miles), as he believes the man is "dodgy". He also decides to move into Pear Tree Cottage himself and set up an office, which helps to integrate the character into the village. Caulfield hoped that Mark's secretive behaviour would not put off viewers. He said that while the characters on-screen would feel their noses put out of joint by the "city folk", viewers will soon realise that the Wyldes are a source of "amusement and intrigue."

Mark and Natasha's children Nathan Wylde (Lyndon Ogbourne), Maisie Wylde (Alice Coulthard) and Will Wylde (Oscar Lloyd) were introduced in February 2009. They arrive in the village for Mark's birthday party. A few months later, Gavin Blyth took over the series producer role at Emmerdale. He worked with Donohoe and Caulfield to "finesse" their characters and help move them forward. He wanted to add a credibility to the Wyldes as a family and he told Digital Spy's Kris Green that both actors "embraced" that, as well as the direction he was planning on taking their characters in. Blyth teased the future of the family, saying "I think what's really telling is that we're about to see the house of cards be brought to its knees. It will tumble – it's just whether or not they can keep things going, that will be the test. Mark's past is about to catch up with them and he'll earn his rightful place in the show." He also said that viewers would see "new layers" to Mark and Natasha, and he was hopeful for an exciting future for them. In May 2009, Caulfield said the scripts made him cry on a "bi-weekly basis" and that, "Mark is being put through the mangle."

The character was later revealed to be a bigamist, who walked out on his wife Faye Lamb (Kim Thomson). Faye was soon introduced to the serial along with her son Ryan Lamb (James Sutton), who it emerges is also Mark's. When Mark visits Faye at her flat, he meets Ryan for the first time and learns the truth. Sutton revealed that his character believes his father is dead and it has just been him and his mother all this time. Ellis said Mark is "understandably in shock" when Faye tells him that Ryan is his son and he is reluctant to believe her, until she shows him some baby photos that show Ryan's resemblance to him. Faye introduces Mark to Ryan as a friend of hers, however, he concludes that they are dating. Sutton told Ellis that Ryan believes they are in a relationship and he is protective of her, so he arranges to go out for a drink with Mark. Sutton also said that Ryan thinks Mark "seems like a very nice guy" and believes him when he says he is not married and has no children. Ryan thinks Mark could really look after Faye. Shortly after, Mark's lies catch up to him when Ryan searches for him online and discovers the truth about his family with Natasha. Sutton explained "His feelings towards Mark change a lot then, and he later warns him off his mum. Ryan tells Mark in no uncertain terms to stay away from Faye, or he'll hurt him." Ellis pointed out that Mark has already managed to turn his son against him, and questioned whether he would want to reveal his real identity to him. Meanwhile, Mark also feuds with Cain Dingle, (Jeff Hordley), who is dating his daughter Maisie. At one point, Mark "sees red" and punches Cain. Jimmy is forced to separate the pair and hold Mark back. Cain then promises to "wreak revenge" upon Mark.

=== Departure ===
On 5 November 2009, Green (Digital Spy) reported that Caulfield had quit the serial after less than a year. Caulfield decided not to renew his contract after his original 12-month one expired. Referring to Mark's double life, Caulfield explained that "there was only so long Mark could keep those two women on the boil before he was the one getting burned!" He felt confident that viewers would enjoy his final storyline, later stating "I've had the opportunity to work with the loveliest group of people. To have the privilege of working with two knockout actresses on a daily basis made Mark really fun to play." The show's series producer Gavin Blyth said the character's "highly-anticipated departure" would had allowed them to come up with "a fantastic exit storyline" that would play out in early 2010. Caulfield filmed his final scenes in December 2009.

The character was killed-off during an hour-long episode, broadcast on 14 January 2010. Producers kept the identity of his killer a secret until the episode aired. Diana Pilkington of the Evening Herald listed the potential suspects as Natasha, Faye, Ryan, Maisie and Nathan. The storyline saw the revelation of Mark and Faye's affair and that Mark was Ryan's biological father. Natasha was revealed to be the person responsible for Mark's death, as she shoots him during the episode. The storyline continued until mid-October when Natasha finally confesses.

Caulfield later admitted that he did not want Mark to die, branding it "a final exit". He felt that if he was in charge, he would have kept all the options open for the character, saying "I think, frankly, that when too many characters die in a community or get away with murder, it doesn't reflect very well on our society. There are what I would regard as more creative ways of off-loading a troublesome character and then have the option of bringing them back to cause more mayhem or bed more wenches or whatever." Caulfield was not resentful of the decision, but he also admitted that he did not expect to enjoy his time with the show as much as he did.

In a 2019 interview with Sarah Ellis of Inside Soap, Caulfield reiterated his stance that Mark should not have been killed off. He believed that the entire Wylde family was broken up too soon, as they had "fantastic potential." He also thought that the scriptwriters "made the mistake of flogging that bigamy storyline into the ground", meaning the viewers were keen to see it end, which in turn meant his character had to go too. Caulfield told Ellis that he wanted a "less ignominious death" and the option to return to the show one day, however, he was aware that they dug up Mark's body to drive home the point that he really was dead.

== Storylines ==
Mark and Natasha first appear on horseback riding into the village to meet Bishop George, who is waiting to hand them over the keys to St. Mary's Church, which they have bought in addition to Home Farm. All three then head to The Woolpack, where they are given an unfriendly welcome, as their buying the church means Ashley Thomas and Laurel Thomas were having to leave the village. However, Natasha announces that they bought the church and vicarage to give back to the community – making them instantly popular. However, Natasha had not discussed this with Mark before announcing it, but she later assures him that was necessary to keep the villagers on side.

A couple of months after the arrival of the Wyldes, Faye Lamb (Thomson) turns up in the village after seeing Mark's photo in a magazine profile of the family. Mark sees her several times, and eventually they have a long conversation in the woods. He apologises for the way he treated her in the past and puts her up in an expensive flat. It emerges that Mark is married to Faye, making his marriage to Natasha bigamous, and his real name is Daniel Lamb. He went missing twenty-seven years ago, after going to pick up a friend from the station, and never returned. They were in serious debt as his company had just gone bankrupt. His parents never recovered from the shock and died shortly afterwards. Faye had Daniel declared legally dead seven years later. He moved to France and later set up a new identity – Mark Wylde. Mark soon learns that Faye was pregnant when he disappeared and that they have a son, Ryan Lamb (Sutton).

Faye tells Natasha everything about Mark's previous life, Natasha is very hurt and angry with Mark that she had been lied to for more than 20 years. Faye, angered by Mark and Natasha's behaviour, moves into the village with Ryan, wanting them to get to know each other. Natasha, however, insists that Mark arrange a job for Ryan in Dubai, which he does, but later withdraws it days before Ryan is due to leave, as he had bonded with Ryan. Natasha warns Mark that it is only a matter of time before the truth comes out.

Mark and Faye plan to get back together, but later decide to leave things as they are, aware of how much pain they would cause their children. But Natasha guesses what Mark was planning on doing and confronts him and Faye, just as they were making plans for Faye to move on. Faye told her this but Natasha refused to believe it, leading to a row. By this time Ryan and Maisie had started a secret relationship. However, while they are up in Ryan's bedroom they hear voices rowing downstairs, which they soon realise are Natasha, Mark and Faye. They come downstairs and announce that they are dating. Natasha, Mark and Faye explain that they cannot because they are half brother and sister and tell them that Mark is a bigamist. Both Ryan and Maisie are devastated and angry. After Natasha orders him to leave, Mark writes a suicide note that evening and goes out to the woods with a shotgun. Natasha finds the note and heads out to the woods and persuades him to give her the gun. But upon hearing him saying that he was not going to run away anymore, she shoots him with the shotgun and buries his body.

Almost six months later, Mark's body is discovered by Sam Dingle (James Hooton), while walking his dog. Natasha claims that she was away at the time Mark was murdered, and she and Nathan frame Ryan. Maisie later proves that Ryan could not have killed Mark as he was with her. After Nathan is confronted by Cain Dingle, (Hordley), who is determined to expose Mark's killer, Natasha confesses and is arrested. She is later sentenced to life imprisonment.

== Reception ==
Simon Swift, in his Soaplife blog criticised Emmerdale for not being "more radical" in their new characters. He said that Mark being an entrepreneur gave "plenty of opportunity for more business storylines favoured by the show. Yawn – as if there weren’t enough already". Swift was, however, thankful that the character was not "another Dingle". Sarah Ellis of Inside Soap was pleased about Caulfield's casting, writing "To say that Inside Soap was excited about Maxwell Caulfield joining Emmerdale is something of an understatement." She also said that "cold January nights in front of the telly" would be "more bearable" following the introduction of Mark.

The Sunday Mail's Laura Davidson wrote that Mark and Natasha "make an unforgettable debut when they sweep into the village on horseback. Let's just hope the Woolpack's supplies of Bollinger are well stocked." Mark's offer to buy Faye a flat prompted a Sunday Mercury writer to quip "he must have done something very bad!"

The character's departure on 14 January 2010 gave Emmerdale its highest ratings since March 2006 with an overnight figure of 9.9 million viewers. For his performance, Caulfield was included on the longlist for Best Exit at the 2010 Inside Soap Awards. Following Mark's exit, Ellis commented that he "made a huge impact in the village."

A Digital Spy writer branded the character a "troubled millionaire" and said he "bowed out in an explosive plot". In a feature on the "Curse of Home Farm", Adam Beresford called Mark and Natasha a "glamorous power couple", before noting that their time at Home Farm was full of scandal with all the revelations about Mark's past. Beresford quipped that instead of divorce "Natasha's solution to Mark's deceit was rather more final..."

In a retrospective article focusing on British soaps in January 2009, a writer for Inside Soap stated that producers "pulled off a casting coup" when they cast Donohoe and Caulfield. They said that the show got a "a touch of Hollywood glamour" when they arrived and branded their characters the "new King and Queen of Home Farm". The writer also observed that "the glamorous pair certainly make an entrance as wealthy power couple Mark and Natasha" and said the rest of their time in the village "won't be such smooth sailing..."
