= Maisie Wylde =

Fictional character from Emmerdale

- Emmerdale character
- Portrayed by: Alice Coulthard
- Duration: 2009–2011
- First appearance: 17 February 2009
- Last appearance: 12 January 2011
- Introduced by: Anita Turner
In-universe information
- Occupation: Barmaid
- Father: Mark Wylde
- Mother: Natasha Wylde
- Brothers: Nathan Wylde; Will Wylde
- Half-brothers: Ryan Lamb
- Husband: Tristan Foster

Maisie Foster (also Wylde) is a fictional character from the British soap opera Emmerdale, played by Alice Coulthard. The character was introduced by series producer Anita Turner and first appeared in 2009. It was announced on 30 June 2010 that Alice Coulthard had quit the show and her character would be written out later in the year.

== Creation ==
The character was first introduced to Emmerdale in February 2009, by series producer Anita Turner played by Alice Coulthard. The character was introduced as a 'fun time girl' and would 'cause a lot of trouble' for her parents, she is the daughter of Natasha (Amanda Donohoe) and Mark (Maxwell Caulfield). It was later revealed that Maisie had only been married six weeks earlier, but left her new husband soon after, moving to the village along with her two brothers and her parents.

== Storylines ==
Maisie comes to the village for her father's 50th birthday party. At the party, she kisses Andy Sugden (Kelvin Fletcher), and later that evening, tells her family that her marriage is over, despite only marrying six weeks before. Her husband Tristan arrives to collect Maisie after Natasha calls him, unaware Maisie had previously left him. She tells Nathan that she is fed up of Tristan's precise and tidy behaviour but agrees to go home with him.

However, as they are leaving, Maisie changes her mind and goes to the Woolpack, where she stays overnight. The next day, she asks if they need any staff, getting a job as barmaid. Within weeks, she decides she wants to own the pub and her father talks to Val Pollard (Charlie Hardwick) about buying it. Val and Maisie try persuading Val's sister Diane Sugden (Elizabeth Estensen), to retire but Natasha calls off the sale when she finds out.

In March, she starts dating Andy, much to her family's horror – hearing gossip about Andy from Belle Dingle (Eden Taylor-Draper) and Nicola De Souza (Nicola Wheeler) – so she claims she is dating Marlon Dingle (Mark Charnock). However, she continues seeing Andy in secret until Debbie Dingle reveals the truth in the Woolpack so they date publicly. In mid-April, after a row with Natasha at a shooting party, Maisie moves in with Andy. By May, after getting fed up with being expected to help on Andy's farm, look after the farmhouse and Andy's daughter Sarah (Sophia Amber Moore), Maisie ends their relationship, returning to the pub until fellow lodger Sandy Thomas (Freddie Jones) sends her back to Home Farm.

Maisie flirts with Cain Dingle (Jeff Hordley), in a relationship that intensifies, due to her parents' disapproval. Cain ends the relationship when Maisie has given him enough material to blackmail Mark. Attempting to forget him, Maisie goes on holiday with Natasha but Natasha returns alone, revealing that Maisie is having too much fun in Brazil to come home yet.

Maisie falls in love with Ryan Lamb (James Sutton). They keep their relationship a secret because Ryan had previously been in a relationship with Maisie's best friend, Katie Sugden (Sammy Winward). Ryan ends his relationship with Katie, but did not tell her why. Their parents catch them as they are about to sleep together and tell them they are siblings. A sickened Maisie lashes out at everyone, throwing a bowl of oranges and crumpling to the floor as she realises that she almost slept with her half-brother. Comforted by Katie one night, she is devastated when she discovers Ryan is sleeping on Katie's sofa. She is devastated, unable to simply "turn off" her feelings for Ryan. Maisie suffers a nervous breakdown, leading to her drinking excessively at work. After Natasha has to identify a body believed to be Mark's, Maisie and Nathan explain to Will that Mark is not going to come back, as he believes. Maisie's erratic behaviour continues and Natasha books her into a clinic in order for her to recover for her ordeal, and after a few weeks she returns home, learning to get along with her now extended family, and resolve her problems. Her friendship with Katie sours after Nathan tells Katie about her relationship with Ryan. She eventually establishes an amicable relationship with Ryan.

Maisie begins dating Nikhil Sharma (Rik Makarem) after realising that they have a mutual attraction to each other, and for a while they are happy together.

Maisie's life begins to fall apart again in July 2010, when her father's body is found in the grounds of Home Farm, and a murder investigation is launched. When the police begin to question her, she reveals her relationship with Ryan, and Nathan's anger at their closeness. After visiting Ryan, Maisie is shocked, after returning to Home Farm, to discover that Nathan has been arrested, and finds it hard to believe that her brother is capable of such murder. After he is released, however, she questions his whereabouts on the night of Mark's death and he is angered that she doubts his innocence. But Maisie is left even more shocked when a chain at the crime scene links Ryan to the murder. Finding it hard to believe, Nathan and Natasha manipulate her into thinking Ryan was upset enough to commit the crime. Ryan is subsequently charged with their father's murder and remanded in custody.

Cain confronts Maisie in The Woolpack and he taunts her that Ryan is innocent. Unsure of what to believe, Maisie later begins to delete photos of Ryan of her phone. After coming across a video taken four months after her father's death, she is stunned to see that Ryan is wearing the chain that was near discovered near the body, meaning that he could not have been the killer. Showing her mother and Nathan the video, Maisie struggles to make a decision of whether she should show the police, but doubts start to form in her mind over Ryan's guilt. Deciding to go to the police, Nathan offers to go with her, before stealing the phone from her bag in the cafe whilst Maisie visits the toilet. Natasha and Nathan pretend to help her search for the phone, whilst behind her back, they delete the footage and dispose of it.

At her father's funeral, Ryan is released to attend the ceremony and by the graveside, he makes a plea for Maisie to visit him, having heard about the phone from his solicitor. Later, Natasha's boyfriend Declan Macey (Jason Merrells) gives her advice and she leaves the wake and goes to see Ryan. At the prison, she reluctantly reveals her thoughts that Nathan is responsible for the theft of her phone and framing Ryan. She leaves hastily, but promises not to give up on him. The following day, Sam Dingle (James Hooton) admits that he found Mark's wallet in the woods and gave it to Cain, his half-brother. Cain visits Maisie and reveals his blackmailing of Natasha and Nathan, but he tells her that he cannot go to the police without incriminating himself for blackmail and deception. Breaking down in Declan's house, Maisie reveals that she believes Nathan killed her father and that Natasha was covering for him. The pair vow to help clear Ryan's name and free him from prison.

Katie shows Maisie a photograph, taken at the same time as the video she found on her phone, and it also shows Ryan wearing the chain. Confronting Nathan, Maisie accuses him of killing their father and framing Ryan. Nathan struggles to believe her accusations and angrily shouts that she is trying to free their father's killer, and snipes that she and Ryan will never be together as they are related, prompting Maisie to slap him. Natasha tries to calm the situation, but when she refuses to confess her involvement, Maisie leaves. Discussing with Nikhil, she decides to get away as she believes that she cannot help Ryan if she has another breakdown. Despite pleas from Nikhil, Declan and Ryan, Maisie leaves the village. On 13 October, Maisie returns and visits Ryan in Prison and lets him know that she has done a lot of thinking and is prepared to help him prove that Nathan killed Mark.

When Ryan is tried and found guilty of Mark's murder, both Maisie and Ryan's mother Faye (Kim Thomson), Mark's first wife, are upset and angry as they both believe that Nathan killed Mark. After leaving the court, Maisie gets a text message from Cain telling her to go to a certain location to meet him. Maisie arrives at an abandoned barn and discovers that Cain has kidnapped Nathan and is holding him prisoner. She goes into the barn and pins Nathan, who is tied to a chair, to the floor. Maisie angrily states that she saw him and Natasha lie in court and resulting in Ryan being imprisoned. She tells Nathan that she hates him and picks up a piece of wood. She demands Nathan tell her the truth about their father's death and is about to hit him. Nathan then tells her that Natasha killed Mark, but initially Maisie does not believe him. Cain brings Natasha and Will to the barn and walks in just as Maisie is about to hit Nathan. To placate her daughter, Natasha tells Maisie that Nathan is telling the truth and that she killed Mark, not Nathan. Maisie demands Natasha to explain, just as Will enters the barn and overhears her confession. Natasha tells Maisie that Mark had treated her badly which is why she killed him. Maisie calls the police and Natasha is arrested. Maisie visits her in prison and demands to know the whole truth but Natasha lies to protect Nathan and Maisie refuses to ever visit her again.

In November, Ryan tells Maisie that Nathan framed him and plays a recording he made after tricking Nathan into confessing. Maisie angrily confronts Nathan and, disgusted, she and Will leave Home Farm, despite his pleas for them to stay. Maisie and Will go to stay at Holdgate Farm with Nikhil. After Ryan orders him to, Nathan goes to Holdgate and tells Maisie how they could solve their problems by him sending all the money he owned to a trust fund for Will. Ryan is standing behind Nathan whilst he tells Maisie this and tells him that if he goes anywhere near Maisie and Will again, they will go to the police. Maisie rejects her brother and tells him to never show his face again.

Maisie becomes closer to Nikhil and he later proposes to her. Maisie hesitates at first but later accepts his proposal much to the dismay of both Will and Nikhil's brother Jai (Chris Bisson). Ella Hart (Corrinne Wicks) organises an engagement party for Nikhil and Maisie at Home Farm. Initially the party seems to be going well and Maisie appears to be happy, but after Nikhil attempts to bond with Will and encourage him, Will loses his temper and breaks down in tears stating that Nikhil was no replacement for his real family.

On seeing how badly Will distressed, Maisie finally admit to Nikhil that she does not love him and had only agreed to marry him in order to provide stability for Will. She breaks off their engagement and gives Nikhil his ring back and later tells him that she felt she was using him and apologizes. She also tells Nikhil that it is best for them is she leaves the village. Maisie decides to move to Dartford with Will to stay with their Aunt for a fresh start. She informs Ryan of their plans and he encourages her by telling her she is doing the right thing and it would be better for them all. Ryan comes to Holdgate Farm and says goodbye to both Maisie and Will. Maisie tearfully says goodbye to Nikhil and gets into a taxi with Will and they are driven out of the village.
