= Ella Hart =

Fictional character from Emmerdale

- Emmerdale character
- Portrayed by: Corrinne Wicks
- Duration: 2010–2011
- First appearance: 17 November 2010
- Last appearance: 25 August 2011
- Introduced by: Gavin Blyth
In-universe information
- Other names: Ella Macey
- Occupation: Businesswoman
- Husband: Declan Macey (backstory)
- Daughters: Mia Macey

Ella Hart (also Macey) is a fictional character from the British ITV soap opera Emmerdale, played by Corrinne Wicks. She made her first on-screen appearance on 17 November 2010. Ella is a businesswoman who is described as "sexy and savvy". She is the ex-wife of Declan Macey (Jason Merrells) and mother of Mia (Sapphire Elia). Wicks was written out of Emmerdale in 2011 and departed on 25 August.

== Character creation and casting ==
In September 2010, it was announced that a new family would be introduced to Emmerdale, following the departure of the established Wylde family. It was revealed that the family would be that of established character Declan Macey (Jason Merrells), who first appeared in the soap in April 2010. Former Doctors actress Corrinne Wicks was cast in the role of Ella Hart, the ex-wife of Declan. Sapphire Elia was cast in the role of Mia Macey, Declan and Ella's daughter, whilst Frank Kelly was cast in the role of Dermot, Declan's father. Of her casting, Wicks commented: "I'm so thrilled to be joining the fantastic cast of Emmerdale, Ella is going to be great fun. She's feisty and glamorous with a no-nonsense attitude. I can't wait to get started as the Maceys make their mark on the Dales." Of the family, Emmerdale series producer Gavin Blyth added: "I'm so pleased to be welcoming three superb actors to our cast at this exciting time. The Maceys are glamorous and dynamic, and their move to the big house signals a new era at Home Farm which will see them firmly at the centre of some of our most compelling storylines."

Ella is a businesswoman who runs a "lucrative" chain of nail bars in Singapore and is described as "sexy and savvy". In an interview with Sunday Mercury, Wicks described Ella as "passionate, no-nonsense, funny and likeable". Discussing Ella's relationship with Declan, she stated: "It is a love-hate relationship. They have stayed in constant contact, particularly because of their daughter. Declan has been over to Singapore because Mia has a motorbike accident and I think seeing each other has sparked something between them again. Ella wants to pursue it. She's going to fight for her man. There is a lot of feeling between them. There is an irresistible pull but they drive each other mad."

On 22 May 2011, it was announced that Wicks was to leave Emmerdale at the end of her contract. The decision to axe the character was made by freshly appointed executive producer Stuart Blackburn. Wicks was upset by the decision but was glad to know the door had been left open for her return.

== Storylines ==
Ella arrives in the village to view Home Farm, half of which is for sale. After viewing the house, she offers Nathan Wylde a reduced price but he declines and Ella leaves. However, Nathan's sister, Maisie tells him to accept so they can leave as soon as possible. The following day, Ella returns and Nathan accepts her offer. She reveals to Nathan and Nicola King (Nicola Wheeler) that she is Declan's ex-wife. She tries to seduce Declan, but he rejects her telling her that they are better as friends. She then signs Home Farm over to Declan and returns to Singapore. Ella returns to the village and goes to Home Farm with daughter Mia. She sees Declan kissing Alicia Gallagher (Natalie Anderson) and insults her. Ella then tells Declan that she and Mia are moving into Home Farm.

Ella and Declan rekindle their marriage and she makes friends with Nicola, encouraging her to keep fighting for her family. As before, Declan's business eventually takes priority and Ella feels neglected and in April 2011, a chance encounter with Mia's boyfriend, Adam Barton, leads to an affair. After Adam's mother Moira, demands that they end the affair, Ella reveals their affair to Declan when drunk. Disgusted that Ella could do that to their daughter, he sacks Adam and throws Ella out. She moves into Holdgate Farm with Jai and uses Mia to try and wreck his budding relationship with Katie Sugden but Declan warns her that if she doesn't leave Katie alone, he'll tell Mia about Ella and Adam's affair. Angry that Ella is still in the village, Declan buys her a plane ticket to Singapore and her affair with Adam is eventually revealed to the village. Realising Mia would never forgive her, she leaves the village for Singapore.

In November 2011, Mia dies in a car accident and she returns for the funeral off screen. She becomes hostile to Declan and Katie and leaves to Singapore, asking Declan to scatter Mia's ashes. When Megan returns, she tells Declan that Ella is now engaged and is still not coping with Mia's death.

== Reception ==
Laura Morgan writing for All About Soap said she had her fingers crossed that "saucy Ella" would lead Adam very astray. Sarah Ellis writing for Inside Soap said that Ella had no morals and her affair with Adam had "disaster written all over it". Jon Horsley from Yahoo! said Ella was a "dose of mischief" in Emmerdale and Wicks had played her "like a younger, naughtier Joan Collins."
