= Faye Lamb =

Emmerdale character

- Emmerdale character
- Portrayed by: Kim Thomson
- Duration: 2009–2011
- First appearance: 27 March 2009
- Last appearance: 24 March 2011
- Introduced by: Gavin Blyth
In-universe information
- Occupation: Personal Assistant (until 2011)
- Sons: Ryan Lamb

Faye Lamb is a fictional character from the British ITV soap opera Emmerdale, played by Kim Thomson. She made her first on-screen appearance on 27 March 2009. In January 2011, it was announced that Thomson had left the series,, she departed in March of that year.

== Creation and development ==
=== Casting ===
The character was first introduced to Emmerdale by then-series producer Gavin Blyth in March 2009, played by Kim Thomson. The character was introduced as a 'mysterious' acquaintance of Mark Wylde, and as his story progressed, it later transpired that Faye had been married to Mark (who at the time of the marriage was known as Daniel Lamb). In July 2009, Faye moved into the village with her son Ryan.

=== Departure ===
In January 2011, Thomson announced that she would be leaving Emmerdale. Speaking of her decision to bow out, Thomson said "I'm sad of course because I've loved working with everyone here, but I found it so hard being away from home. It's just too far from London. I've got friends I literally haven't seen for two years because I get home at weekends and there's only a 24-hour window to fit everyone in. That's been hard, but I've had an amazing time here and been so lucky with storylines – I'll be sad to go."

Of her on-screen exit, Thomson continued "I can't say anything about how I leave because the producers want to keep that under wraps for now. I'm sure, as with most Emmerdale exits, it will be dramatic."

Asked what she will miss most about Emmerdale, Thomson stated "I think, as with everything, you miss the people. They're a lovely crowd, great crew and actors and it's been a pleasure working with them. It's also been great fun to do something where it's all a bit heightened and you get to go around slapping other women – and there was a lot of slapping. I've enjoyed being the slappee and the slapper!"

== Storylines ==
Faye is first spotted by Mark pulling out of Home Farm and he is worried that she is responsible for his son Will's disappearance. However, Will was discovered camping in the grounds of Home Farm. The following week, she applies for a marketing job at Home Farm, impressing Natasha Wylde, who offers her the job. The following night, Mark goes to visit but discovers that she has left. Faye rings Natasha, declining the job and worries Mark again when she takes a picture of the Wylde family from Home Farm, smashing a vase in the process. Panicked, Mark warns her to stay away. Mark and Faye meet in the woods and he gives her an expensive flat, hoping she will leave him alone.

In May 2009, Faye returns, asking about the job and learns that Mark and Natasha are renewing their wedding vows. Faye confronts Mark, revealing that his real name is Daniel Lamb and he is, in fact, married to her, making his marriage to Natasha bigamous. Daniel had disappeared 27 years earlier after his company collapsed, leaving them in serious debt. He moved to France and later set up a new, stolen identity, Mark Wylde. Mark tells Faye that he did love her. The next day, Faye attends the vow renewal ceremony, telling Mark that she only kept the truth about him to herself because she did not want to hurt Natasha or his children. Faye continues to text Mark and they meet again in June 2009. She introduces him to their son, Ryan, who has recently moved in with her and has no idea that Mark is his father.

In late June, Natasha discovers that Mark has bought a flat and, on investigating, finds Faye. Faye tells her about Mark's past. Natasha is stunned but convinced when Mark admits it and realises that Faye wants her husband back. Despite her anger and disgust, she stays with Mark, making him promise to keep this from their children. She then threatens Faye that she will tell Ryan that she has been lying about his father unless Faye stays away from them. When Faye continues to contact Mark, Natasha offers her a large financial settlement to leave or face being reported for insurance fraud. Faye demands £50,000 more than the original offer and on receiving it, she and Ryan vacate the flat. However, in July, they rent a cottage in Emmerdale.

Faye takes a job as PA at Sharma and Sharma, the new sweet factory in the village, and has a brief relationship with Cain Dingle. This ends, however, when Cain realises that Faye is using him to make Mark jealous. Mark realises that he still has feelings for Faye and tells her that he wants her back. She agrees, on condition that he leaves Natasha and tells him that she is not prepared to be his bit on the side. They plan to run away together but realising the pain they will cause, change their minds and share a goodbye kiss, which Natasha witnesses. The three of them have a row, during which Ryan comes downstairs with Mark and Natasha's daughter Maisie and announce that they are dating. Natasha tells them that they cannot date each other because they are half-brother and sister, devastating Ryan and Maisie. Ryan is angry with Mark and Faye for lying to him and moves in with ex-girlfriend, Katie Sugden, until he can organise somewhere else.

Later, Faye's house is broken into and ransacked by Mark and Natasha's son Nathan. Faye returns home and Nathan attacks her, pinning her down. Shortly afterwards Ryan returns home and pulls Nathan off his mother and throws him out. Ryan soon moves into Dale View with Andy Sugden. Faye later embarks on a relationship with her boss, Jai Sharma.

In July 2010, Nathan and Natasha plot to frame Faye for Mark's murder, but when Mark's body is discovered, Natasha discovers that Nathan has framed Ryan instead of Faye. Subsequently, Ryan is arrested and charged with Mark's murder. Jai and Faye split up due to the pressure of Ryan's imprisonment. In September, Faye, still adamant that her son is innocent, forms an alliance with Natasha's business partner and former boyfriend Declan Macey to try to bring down the Wyldes. This begins with Faye contesting Mark's will.

In October, Ryan is found guilty of Mark's murder but Faye remains convinced of his innocence and becomes increasingly frustrated with Cain, Ryan's boss, who believes Nathan is guilty but will not go to the police for fear of incriminating himself, having previously blackmailed Nathan and Natasha. Cain kidnaps Nathan and after alerting Maisie, she forces Nathan to confess that it was Natasha who killed Mark. Natasha confirms that Nathan is telling the truth and is arrested.

Faye goes to court to witness Natasha's sentencing, angering Nathan. Natasha is sentenced to life imprisonment and ordered to serve a minimum term of 21 years before being considered for parole. Faye remarks smugly to Nathan that it was worth waiting for.

Faye develops a strong dislike of Charity Tate, Cain's girlfriend and second cousin, after she begins working for Jai as a new property developer. Faye enjoys goading Charity and informs Cain of Jai and Charity's flirting. Cain, mistakenly believing that Charity and Jai are sleeping together, seduces Faye, and they sleep together. They kiss each other in the street as Cain leaves Faye's house the following morning. Charity witnesses this and furiously slaps Faye.

Faye is fired from her job by Jai after slapping him, after he goads and insults her over her jealousy of Charity, and threatens to sue the firm for unfair dismissal. Jai's brother Nikhil, worried about the bad reputation the company might earn if Faye's lawsuit is successful, decides to settle Faye out of court, and offers her a £10,000 settlement which she accepts.

After this, Faye tells Ryan that she intends to leave the village for a fresh start. She tells him that she is moving to San Francisco as she has friends there and offers Ryan the chance to come with her but he refuses, telling her that his future is in the village. Ryan helps Faye pack up her house. She leaves the following day and tearfully bids Ryan farewell, telling him that she will miss him. Katie also comes to see her off and Faye tells her that she will be one of the people she will miss. Cain also briefly bids farewell to her as he walks past. Faye then gets into her taxi and is driven out of the village as Ryan and Katie wave her off.
