= Ash Palmisciano =

English actor

- Born: 3 January 1990 (age 35); Leamington Spa, Warwickshire, England
- Education: Royal Central School of Speech and Drama
- Occupation: Actor
- Years active: 2016–present
- Television: Emmerdale

Ash Palmisciano (born 3 January 1990) is an English actor. He came out as transgender in 2012 and later became the first trans actor to appear on stage at the Royal Shakespeare Company. He was later hired by the ITV1 soap opera Emmerdale to work as a story consultant for a trans storyline, but after impressing producers, he was instead cast on the soap. His character, Matty Barton, became the first trans character on Emmerdale and he won the Best Newcomer accolade at the Inside Soap Awards for his portrayal of Matty.

== Early life ==
Palmisciano was born on 3 January 1990 in Leamington Spa, Warwickshire. Ash discussed gender dysphoria in a 2020 TED talk, recalling discomfort using female changing rooms, and feeling forced to use pink items. However, he always knew he wanted to be an actor. His school career advisor told him that aspiring to be an actor was unrealistic and he failed various drama school auditions, and alongside his struggles with gender dysphoria, he decided to take a break from acting.

Palmisciano came out to his family as transgender in 2012. He said that despite having a loving family, his coming out shocked them and his parents were unsure of how to support him due to their lack of knowledge about trans people. Palmisciano's family helped him through his transition and he decided to get back into acting. He attended a summer acting school for trans people led by the Royal Central School of Speech and Drama, which gave him the confidence to begin attending auditions for theatre and television work. He also played an elf during numerous Christmas seasons due to his short height.

== Career ==
In 2016, Palmisciano made his television debut in an episode of the BBC Two sitcom Boy Meets Girl. He then began working with the charity Diversity Role Models, with whom he visited schools across the UK to talk about his experiences as a trans man. He described the work as the most terrifying thing he had done, but wished that he had heard the same talk as a child. In 2018, he wrote and directed a short film, The Lady That Dances, which was broadcast on Channel 4. He then worked for the Royal Shakespeare Company and was the first trans actor to appear on their stage.

As he was considering applying for a factory job, trans media project All About Trans recommended Palmisciano to an Emmerdale workshop and he advised them on a trans storyline. After he informed producers that he was an actor, he was asked to audition for the part of Matty Barton. The character, who was previously on the soap as Hannah (Grace Cassidy), was reintroduced as a trans man that had transitioned off-screen. This marked the first trans character on Emmerdale, as well as Palmisciano being the first trans actor on the soap. Palmisciano was originally contracted on Emmerdale for a three-month-long stint, but it was soon renewed and he has remained on the soap since. At the 2018 Inside Soap Awards, he won the accolade for Best Newcomer. In 2023, he became a judge on the National Diversity Awards panel.

== Personal life ==
Palmisciano made his relationship with girlfriend Shea Rowan public on New Year's Eve 2021. Palmisciano's mother died aged 60 in 2022 due to complications from long-term rheumatoid arthritis.

== Filmography ==
Year	Title	Role	Notes	Ref.
2016	Boy Meets Girl	Alex	1 episode	
2017	Mum	Andrew	Short film	
2018–present	Emmerdale	Matty Barton	Regular role	
2020	Pop	Stu	Short film	

== Stage ==
Year	Title	Role	Venue	Ref.
2016	King Lear	Knight/Beggar/Soldier	Royal Shakespeare Company	
2017	Summer in London	Jack	Theatre Royal Stratford East	

== Awards and nominations ==
Year	Ceremony	Category	Nominated work	Result	Ref.
2018	Inside Soap Awards	Best Newcomer	Emmerdale	Won	
