= Ryan Lamb (Emmerdale) =

Fictional character from Emmerdale

- Emmerdale character
- James Sutton as Ryan Lamb (2010)
- Portrayed by: James Sutton
- Duration: 2009–2011
- First appearance: 15 June 2009
- Last appearance: 26 April 2011
- Introduced by: Gavin Blyth
In-universe information
- Occupation: Mechanic
- Father: Mark Wylde
- Mother: Faye Lamb
- Stepmother: Natasha Wylde (2009–2010)
- Half-brothers: Nathan Wylde; Will Wylde
- Half-sisters: Maisie Wylde

Ryan Lamb is a fictional character from the British soap opera Emmerdale. He was played by actor James Sutton and made his first appearance in June 2009. In February 2011, it was announced that Sutton would be leaving the show in spring 2011. He made his last appearance on 26 April 2011.

== Creation and development ==
=== Casting ===
On 23 March 2009, it was announced that former Hollyoaks actor James Sutton would be joining the cast of Emmerdale as the son of already established character Faye Lamb. Speaking in an interview with Digital Spy, Sutton commented on Ryan: "He's a laddish lad and an out-of-work mechanic. He's grown up with his mum and is very protective of her. I wouldn't say he's a ladies' man, but he has an eye for the pretty ladies in the village. He's a nice guy, but when the storyline progresses and we discover things about Ryan's family, the audience might possibly see another side to him – maybe a darker side..."

=== Departure ===
In February 2011, it was announced that James Sutton will leaving Emmerdale towards the end of the year, coinciding with the departure of Kim Thomson, who plays his screen mother Faye. Commenting on his departure, Sutton said: "I feel that Ryan's storylines have drawn to a natural conclusion and, although I'll be sad to say goodbye, I'm excited about what the future holds." Also, Emmerdale's executive producer Steve November said: "James has been a much valued member of the cast and we wish him all the best for the future." Sutton departed from the series in April 2011. He returned to his role as John Paul McQueen in Hollyoaks the following year.

== Storylines ==
Ryan is the son of Faye Lamb. Ryan never knew his father, believing that he had died before he was born. Mark, whom Faye knew as Daniel, left her deep in debt, unaware she was pregnant. When they meet in March 2009, he is unaware of their connection.

Faye and Ryan move to Emmerdale, and Ryan came with her, unaware of his mother's ulterior motives and his parentage. He gets a job working for Debbie Dingle as a mechanic, and settles into village life and making friends.

In October Ryan starts dating Katie Sugden. Faye invites Katie to dinner and questions her about unsavoury gossip she had heard about Katie's past. Furious, Katie reveals everything about her past relationships to Ryan and Faye and leaves. Ryan follows her, shocked by her history but pleased that she had been honest. Katie admitted to deliberately not telling him, worried that he would dump her but he insisted he would not do that. Ryan was angry with his mother and insisted she apologise to Katie, and she did so. Katie forgave Faye and asked her to come directly to her rather than listen to gossip. Mark also reassured Faye that Katie was a great girl and a suitable girlfriend for Ryan.

Maisie Wylde was intrigued by Ryan until she discovered Faye and Mark's relationship and believed that they were having an affair. She forgave her father but condemned Faye, making unpleasant comments at every opportunity. Consequently, she struggled to get on with Ryan but made an effort for Katie's sake, as Katie was one of her closest friends. Eventually Maisie and Ryan bonded over shopping for Christmas presents but got too close. Refusing to cheat on Katie, Ryan ended their relationship in January 2010 and started dating Maisie. On the day they decided to consummate their relationship, they heard Mark, Faye and Maisie's mother Natasha, arguing downstairs and after forcing their parents to reveal the truth, discovered that they are half-siblings. Neither reacted well to the revelation. Ryan was furious with Mark for abandoning Faye and that this information had been kept from him. Ryan moved in with Katie and they reconciled until Nathan told Katie about Ryan and Maisie's relationship.

Ryan moved back in with his mother, and rebuilt his relationship with her. Ryan developed a good relationship with his younger half-brother, Will, and became amicable with Maisie again. However, his relationship with Nathan was difficult following the revelations about their family. Ryan was the rightful heir to Mark's fortune, including his money and property. Nathan was jealous and felt threatened by this and was concerned that Ryan would get his inheritance and leave him with nothing.

Unbeknownst to Ryan, Natasha murdered Mark, shooting him the day after the revelation of his bigamy and this would later have repercussions for Ryan.

In April 2010, Ryan moves into Dale View with Andy Sugden and at their housewarming party, he is kissed by Eve Jenson. Andy and Katie warn Ryan about Eve's past but that night Ryan and Eve sleep together. The following day, however, Eve tells Ryan that it was a one-off and she does not want to have a relationship with him.

After Mark's body is discovered by Sam Dingle in July 2010, the police arrest Nathan but he is released without charge. Blaming Faye and Ryan for destroying his family life, Nathan frames Ryan for the murder, burying the murder weapon at the garage where Ryan worked, putting gunpowder residue on his clothes and planting a gold chain of Ryan's at the crime scene. Ryan is arrested and charged with Mark's murder. He is remanded in custody and later resigns himself to the fact that he would be found guilty due to the overwhelming evidence against him, until Faye tells him that Maisie had found a photograph of him on her phone, wearing the chain months after Mark died. But Maisie also tells her mother and Nathan. Nathan steals her phone and deletes the picture.

In September 2010 Ryan is granted permission to attend Mark's funeral. Listening to Will's speech Ryan is moved to tears by Will's references to his father and Ryan being his brother. At the graveside, he asks Maisie to talk to him, to which Nathan and Faye both react angrily. After a confrontation, Ryan is led away by the prison guards. Back at the prison, Maisie later visits Ryan and they discuss the stolen evidence. Ryan convinces Maisie that Nathan is the only person capable of framing him for murder.

The following week, Maisie visits Ryan again to tell him that she now has a photo that could prove his innocence and that she will give it to his solicitor but it is not enough to get him released on bail. Maisie then informs Ryan that she is leaving the village to clear her head and stop herself from having another nervous breakdown, and despite Ryan begging her to stay, she leaves.

Ryan also embarks on a relationship with prison guard Abi Peterson who gives him a mobile phone so he can call Faye. They are nearly caught out by Ryan's cellmate Curtis Bevan who later discovers Ryan's phone and steals it for himself. When Ryan tries to get it back, Curtis beats him up and is transferred to another cell.

Nathan also visits Ryan and tries to convince him to convince Faye to drop her contest of Mark's will. Nathan goads Ryan and makes a thinly veiled threat to Faye's life. Ryan loses his temper and attacks Nathan and they have to be separated by guards. Ryan is dragged back to his cell shouting threats at Nathan that he will kill him if he hurts his mother.

Nathan later discovers Ryan's relationship with Abi and informs the prison authorities and she is transferred to another prison.

Maisie returns in October 2010 and visits Ryan again, and promises to help prove his innocence and later confronts Nathan, demanding to know the truth.

Ryan is tried and found guilty of murder and both Faye and Maisie are upset and angry and both believed that Nathan was Mark's killer. Ryan's friend and colleague at the garage, Cain Dingle, kidnaps Nathan and with Maisie's help they intimidate him into revealing that Natasha killed Mark. In order to stop Maisie from hurting Nathan again, Natasha confesses to killing Mark and framing Ryan and she is arrested after Maisie calls the police. Ryan is later released and returns to the village. He is angry when Maisie reveals that she believes Natasha acted alone and that Nathan was not involved in Ryan's imprisonment and that she does not believe his accusations.

After getting drunk in the Woolpack one night, Ryan confronts Nathan whilst he is having a drink with barmaid Alicia Gallagher and squares up to him. He then leaves the pub and smashes Nathan's car window and the brothers nearly have a fight but Maisie splits them up and Ryan goes home.

After Natasha is sentenced, Nathan taunts Ryan in the pub that Maisie and Will have picked him over Ryan and that he has still got all of their father's money. After nearly attacking Nathan again, Ryan swears revenge on Nathan.

The day before Nathan, Maisie and Will were due to leave the village and move back to London, Ryan visits Nathan at Home Farm. With the help of businessman Declan Macey who wants the Wyldes out of Home Farm, Ryan tricks Nathan into confessing that he framed him, whilst secretly recording him on a device installed by Declan. He plays the recording to Maisie and she and Will leave Nathan, disgusted at his lies. Nathan furiously visited Ryan at his home the following day and Ryan tricked him again by ordering him to give all of his money to a trust fund for Will. When Nathan goes to Holdgate Farm to tell Maisie, Ryan appears and pins Nathan to his car and tells him that if he ever comes near Maisie and Will again, they will go to the police with the recording and tell them about Nathan's framing of Ryan. Nathan leaves the village the same day.

With Nathan gone, Ryan gradually begins to rebuild his life and returns to his job. In January, Will reveals that Nathan has been trying to contact him and breaks his mobile phone. Ryan gets Will a new phone with a new number so Nathan cannot contact him again.

Will is later unhappy when Maisie's boyfriend Nikhil Sharma proposes to her. He tells Maisie that he wants them to live with Ryan but when Maisie suggests this to him, Ryan tells her that they can never live together due to them nearly committing incest. After breaking off her engagement to Nikhil, Maisie tells Ryan that she intends to move to Dartford with Will to live with their Aunt. Ryan supports her decision and bids them farewell as they leave the village.

In March, Faye decides to leave the village and move to San Francisco after losing her job. She offers Ryan the chance to come with her but he refuses, telling her that his future is in the village. Ryan helps Faye pack up her house and she leaves him her car. As she is preparing to leave she tearfully bids Ryan farewell, telling him that she will miss him and he waves her off, along with Katie and Cain.

Whilst Ryan is on a night out with Cain, he tricks Ryan into talking to a young woman whilst he steals her car. Ryan is angry and tells Cain that he does not want to go back to prison and orders him to not use him in any of his criminal scams.

But Cain does not listen and the following month, he tricks Ryan into acting as a lookout whilst he burgles Holdgate Farm and steals Jai Sharma's car. Ryan is furious and again warns Cain that he does not want to go back to prison for anybody. He also tells Cain that if the police come calling, he will not protect him. The police later visit Ryan to speak to him after arresting Cain. They decided that Cain acted alone during the burglary and that Ryan was not involved.

After assessing his life in the village, Ryan decides to leave for a fresh start. He resigns from his job at the garage and Debbie begs him to stay but he refuses, telling her that he has no family in the village nor a girlfriend. After realising that she cannot change his mind, Debbie offers to send his wages on to him through the post.

On 26 April 2011, Ryan gets ready to leave. He asks Marlon Dingle and Diane Sugden for some boxes to put his belongings in. He then goes to the garage to say goodbye to Cain and they have one last drink together. Ryan tells Cain that he wants to put his past behind him and have a fresh start. Cain wishes him the best of luck. As Ryan is packing up his car, Andy, Katie and Gennie Walker come to bid farewell to him. Katie begs Ryan to change his mind, telling him that he has many friends in the village but he refuses again. He tells them that he intends to stay at a friend's house and promises Katie that he will keep in touch with them. Cain watches from a distance and Ryan gives him a nod of farewell. Andy, Katie and Gennie wave him off as he gets into his car and drives out of the village.
