= Carolin Stoltz =

Swedish actress (born 1981)

- Born: 2 May 1981 (age 45); Borås, Sweden
- Occupation: Actress
- Years active: 2007–present

Anne Frida Carolin Stoltz (born 2 May 1981 in Borås, Sweden) is a Swedish actress, who is best known for her role as Ukrainian immigrant Olena Petrovich in the British TV soap Emmerdale. She has previously had minor TV roles in the British television series Doctors and the ITV Christmas special Clash of the Santas, where she played a German terrorist determined to undermine a 'best Santa' competition. Stoltz trained to be an actress at the Drama Centre London. She appears as Polish hairdresser Ava Lipinski in the Sky1 comedy series The Café. She played Norwegian police officer Anke Strøm in Shetland (S4). She appeared in the daytime drama Justice in Liverpool. She has also acted in her native Sweden, doing both theatre and film. She also appeared in The Inbetweeners Movie.

As a stage actress, she appeared in the Agatha Christie play Witness for the Prosecution at County Hall, London, a former municipal building transformed into a performing arts venue. She also appeared in the play Birdsong at Birmingham Rep.

Stoltz grew up in Borås, Sweden, before moving to Gothenburg. She applied to Balettakademien in Gothenburg, dreaming of a career in musical theatre, but wasn't accepted; this led her to move to the United Kingdom.
