= Stepping Up =

British television series

Stepping Up is a five-part drama programme shown on the CBBC Channel from 3 to 7 September 2012. It is a series of one-off dramas about children making the move from primary to secondary school. Music was composed and performed by Steve Wright, who also composed the music for Brookside, Damon and Debbie, Waterfront Beat, And The Beat Goes On, Hollyoaks, Courtroom, Moving On series 1–6, Justice, Secrets And Words and The Very Hungry Frenchman. The five-part drama programme was last re-broadcast on CBBC on 31 May 2019 at 13:15pm.

== List of Stepping Up episodes ==
No.	Title	Original release date
1	"The Cloudwatch Club"	3 September 2012
Dylan and Alfie have been best friends ever since they first met in primary school, on the move to secondary school, they drift apart and ending up joining two different clubs, can they make up?
2	"Home Games"	4 September 2012
Just as Jack seems to be struggling to accept his stepdad, his real dad suddenly comes back into his life on his first day of secondary school. On Jack's first day, his new friends are arguing about which one of Liverpool and Everton are better. Jack gets away with not viewing his opinion, but he is torn between his stepdad and real dad who support opposing teams, who shall he choose?
3	"Bag Girl"	5 September 2012
Tomboy Becky Tyler finds that she doesn't fit in at her new all-girls secondary school.
4	"Download"	6 September 2012
Polly copes with her new school by filming everything with her mobile phone.
5	"Tale of Two Cities"	7 September 2012
Owain has recently moved to Manchester from Wales, and he's desperate to go back home.
