= Natasha Wylde =

Fictional character from Emmerdale

- Emmerdale character
- Portrayed by: Amanda Donohoe
- Duration: 2009–2010
- First appearance: 15 January 2009
- Last appearance: 24 November 2010
- Created by: Anita Turner
In-universe information
- Occupation: Businesswoman
- Husband: Mark Wylde (void)
- Sons: Nathan Wylde; Will Wylde
- Daughters: Maisie Wylde
- Stepsons: Ryan Lamb (2009–2010)

Natasha Wylde is a fictional character from the British soap opera Emmerdale played by Amanda Donohoe. She made her first appearance, along with her husband Mark Wylde (Maxwell Caulfield), on 15 January 2009. It was announced in July 2010 that Donohoe had quit her role as Natasha, and would leave the series later in the year. She made her final appearance on 24 November 2010.

== Creation and development ==
The characters of Mark and Natasha Wylde were announced in September 2008, with Maxwell Caulfield and Amanda Donohoe announced as the actors portraying them. They started filming in October 2008, and were originally thought to be first appearing on 25 December 2008, but this was later changed to 15 January 2009.

The casting of Amanda Donohoe, a well-known name in the United Kingdom and a Golden Globe Award-winning actress, caused press interest with Donohoe doing many interviews prior to her character's first appearance. In one interview she defended soap actors and said that it is a "huge privilege" to be on the screen of "eight million people five days a week". Describing being asked to take the part, Donohoe said, "I would have been stupid to say no. I am quite excited because I pretty much take over the village and cause a lot of trouble", also saying in another interview that she was "flattered" to be asked to join the soap. In an interview with the Daily Express, the actress said that although she was flattered they wanted to create a role for her, it was "a hell of a challenge". Anita Turner, the series producer, said she was "thrilled to be welcoming two actors of such high calibre to the cast".

Describing her character she said Natasha is "not a classic soap 'bitch'" and described her as "humorous, witty and strong" but would "rub people up the wrong way". Amanda Donohoe said that the Wyldes are "self-made millionaires, they're very well-to-do", and although not looking for retirement they do want a "break from the big city". Donohoe said the couple have two grown-up children and a nine-year-old.

== Storylines ==
Mark and Natasha first appear on horseback, going to meet Bishop George, who will give them the keys to St. Mary's Church and Home Farm, as they are the new owners. All three head to The Woolpack, where they receive an unpleasant welcome, as the fact they bought the church means Ashley and Laurel Thomas were having to leave. However, Natasha announces that they bought the church and vicarage to return it to the community – making them instantly popular.

=== Bigamy ===
In late June, Natasha discovers Mark was married to Faye Lamb. Mark, real name Daniel Lamb, went missing twenty-seven years ago. He told Faye that he was going to collect a friend from the station and never returned. They were in serious debt as his company had gone bankrupt. His parents never recovered and died shortly after Faye had Daniel declared legally dead. Unaware of this and the fact that Faye was expecting their child, he moved to France and set up a new identity – Mark Wylde.

Natasha was very hurt, knowing her marriage was a lie. She left briefly but returned, deciding not to end things with Mark. However, she insisted that Mark's past was kept a secret, paying Faye to leave after threatening to report her for insurance fraud. Faye, however, angered by Mark and Natasha's behaviour, moved to the village with Ryan, wanting Mark and Ryan to get to know each other. Natasha, wanting them to leave, got Mark to arrange a job in Dubai for Ryan after he made friends with his half-brothers. However, Mark wanted Ryan to stay and withdrew the Dubai job, much to Natasha and Ryan's horror.

Maisie, however, struggled to cope with Faye and Ryan's presence. She saw Faye as the woman determined to break up her family, thinking Mark and Faye had had an affair. The affair was over and Natasha had forgiven Mark. Maisie also forgave him, on the understanding that he wouldn't hurt her mother again. They became reluctant friends, due to both making an effort to get on as Ryan was dating Katie Sugden.

=== Murder ===
During December 2009, Ryan and Maisie got closer. They spent more time together and Maisie helps him choose a Christmas present for Katie. Eventually they realize they have romantic feelings for each other and, after Nathan sees them kissing, Ryan ends things with Katie and they start dating.

Meanwhile, Mark and Faye were also planning to get back together but changed their minds, aware of the pain that would be caused. Natasha caught them kissing and confronted them, leading to a row. All three were horrified to see Ryan and Maisie come downstairs and announce their new relationship. They were relieved to hear that they hadn't slept together and Natasha told them that they were related. Neither took the news well so Faye and Natasha concentrated on taking care of their children and asked Mark to leave. Nathan was furious when he heard Ryan call Mark Dad but went to look after Maisie and his mother. Mark tried explaining but no one wanted to listen so when they left, he went to the woods with a shotgun. Natasha found him and, scared he would shoot himself, persuaded him to give her the gun. But listening to Mark talk about how he was tired of running, infuriated Natasha so much that she shot him and buried his body in the woods. Returning to the house, she told her children that Mark has left and she has no idea where he is. On 28 January, Faye reported Mark's disappearance. They question Natasha, who tells them about Mark's life as Daniel Lamb and that he is a bigamist.

Nathan is suspicious of Natasha's erratic behaviour, following Mark's disappearance, and she eventually tells Nathan that she killed him. Initially furious, he tried digging up Mark's body but agreed to keep Natasha's secret for the sake of his siblings and on condition that Natasha gives him her money. She does and Nathan leaves the village for London. Businessman Declan Macey buys a 51% share of Home Farm Estate. He and Natasha later start dating. Nathan returns in May and takes an instant dislike of Declan. He demands that Natasha end things with Declan and buy him out but she refuses. Nathan threatens to report her to the police for Mark's murder but backs down when Natasha tells him she'll report him for helping cover the murder up. Nathan returns Natasha's money and starts running the Estate with Natasha and Declan.

In June, Sam Dingle finds Mark's wallet. His half-brother, Cain, uses Mark's credit card to send the family some flowers. Natasha initially thinks Nathan sent the flowers and throws them at his car when he pulls up outside the house. Cain also sends one of Mark's suits to Declan, who demands the truth from the Wyldes. Natasha later arranges to meet Cain after Nathan tells her that he is the blackmailer and he demands money but she refuses. Will later goes missing and Natasha thinks that he has been kidnapped. She and Nathan later discover that Cain took Will and Belle to the café for ice cream. Thankful that Will is safe, Natasha pays Cain to stay away from them.

In July 2010, Nathan and Natasha plan to frame Faye for Mark's murder. Natasha agrees to the plan, believing Mark's death would have never happened if Faye hadn't come to the village. On 26 July, Sam's dog, Alfie, finds Mark's body. The police found Mark's watch and other evidence to identify the body. The police ask Natasha if Mark had a pin in his knee, which she confirms and also confirms that the body is Mark's. Natasha tells her children that their father is dead and is devastated at the hurt and pain she has caused them.

Framed by Nathan, Ryan is arrested and charged with murder. Later, Maisie leaves the village, believing Ryan is innocent. She thinks Nathan killed Mark, and Natasha is covering for him. Declan loses faith in Natasha and dumps her, agreeing with Maisie. Declan refuses Natasha and Nathan's offer to buy him out of Home Farm, believing that the Wyldes will soon be leaving. Maisie returns and visits Natasha, demanding she explain why she is covering for Nathan, staying with Faye. Natasha visits her but argues with Faye, telling her that Mark would still be alive if she hadn't come to the village. Faye slaps her and Natasha walks away but Faye shouts after her that she and Nathan will never be free of their guilt.

Natasha gives evidence at Ryan's trial. She falters on reading the oath but gives a convincing performance as a grieving widow. During the trial, Nathan is kidnapped by Cain, who intended to torture him to get a confession. Natasha tries contacting Nathan but does not get a reply. On 26 October 2010, Ryan is found guilty and as she leaves the court, Maisie confronts Natasha and again accuses her of covering for Nathan, and as good as killing Ryan. Natasha goes home to discover Will has returned from staying with a family friend and finds Cain in the kitchen. He reveals he kidnapped Nathan and has left Maisie with him, taking Natasha and Will to the barn where he is holding Nathan captive and after hearing Nathan scream, Natasha finds Maisie about to hit Nathan with a piece of wood. Nathan told Maisie that Natasha had killed Mark but Maisie didn't believe him. Thinking Nathan committed the murder, she asks Natasha to stop covering for Nathan. Natasha then confesses that she killed Mark but Will overhears her confession. Natasha gives Maisie her mobile phone and tells her that her fate is in her hands. Maisie calls the police, despite Natasha and Nathan's suggestions of a fresh start and telling Cain for forcing her to confess but she refuses. Natasha apologizes to Maisie and goes to hug Will to tell him that she still loves him but Will rejects her, saying he doesn't want her love, he wants his father back. The police arrive and Natasha is arrested and taken away. The following day, Maisie visits Natasha in prison and demands the whole truth. Natasha tells Maisie that she acted alone but Maisie refuses to believe her. Natasha asks Maisie to bring Will on her next visit but Maisie says that neither of them want to see her again. Natasha is then escorted to her cell by a prison guard. The door is shut and locked. Natasha sits down on a chair and resigns herself to her fate.

On 24 November 2010, Natasha is sentenced to life imprisonment for Mark's murder and ordered by the judge to serve a minimum term of 21 years before being considered for parole. Nathan attends Natasha's sentencing and is shocked by the length of the sentence. Faye also attends the sentencing. As Natasha is led away, she mouths the word "sorry" to Nathan. Natasha is last seen being escorted into prison by guards.

== Reception ==
Simon Swift, in his Soaplife blog criticised Emmerdale for not being "more radical" in their new characters, rather than having another "bitch" stereotype, although he said if Natasha was to "reach the heights of Kim Tate – we'll all be happy". Swift was, however, thankful that the character was not "another Dingle".
