= Lyndon Ogbourne =

English actor (born 1983)

- Born: 18 May 1983 (age 43); Swindon, Wiltshire, England
- Occupation: Actor
- Years active: 2000–present
- Children: 1
- Relatives: Michael Beint (grandfather)

Lyndon Saul Ogbourne (born 18 May 1983) is an English actor. He is known for his role as Nathan Wylde in the ITV1 soap opera Emmerdale.

== Biography ==
Ogbourne began acting at the age of six. He was educated at Commonweal School before studying drama, media and photography at Swindon College. He trained at the London Academy of Music and Dramatic Art.

Ogbourne's grandfather, Michael Beint and his brother, Tristan Beint, are also actors.

Ogbourne started his television career in 2000 with a part in TV film Anchor Me opposite Annette Crosbie. Guest roles in Spooks and Robin Hood followed in 2006. In 2008, Ogbourne appeared in Doctors as Ed Toomey.

In February 2009, Ogbourne joined Emmerdale as part of the new Wylde family. In August 2010, it was announced he was to leave the show.

In 2011, he toured the UK in Agatha Christie's play The Verdict.

In 2016, he played Connor in the feature film White Island.

== Filmography ==
Year	Title	Role	Notes
2000	Anchor Me	Young Billy	Television film
2006	Spooks	Blogger: Episode 5.2 (2006)	Spy drama
2006	Robin Hood	Rowan: Turk Flu (2006)	Drama
2008	Doctors	Ed Toomey: Heston C in Da House (2008)	Soap opera
2009	Vidiotic		Sketch show
2009	Emmerdale	Nathan Wylde (2009–2010)	Soap opera
2016	White Island	Connor	Film

== Awards and nominations ==
Year	Award	Category	Result	Ref.
2009	Inside Soap Awards	Best Newcomer	Nominated	
2010	The British Soap Awards	Villain of the Year	Nominated	
2010	The British Soap Awards	Best Newcomer	Nominated	
2011	The British Soap Awards	Villain of the Year	Nominated	
