= Alice Coulthard =

English actress

- Born: 18 November 1983 (age 42); London, England
- Occupation: Actress
- Years active: 1993–present
- Spouse: Owen Dyke (m. 2010)
- Children: 2

Alice Coulthard (born 18 November 1983) is an English actress. She is best known for her role as Maisie Wylde in ITV soap opera Emmerdale.

== Education ==
Alice Coulthard attended Fortismere School, Muswell Hill, N10 and later graduated in English Literature from University of Liverpool.

== Career ==
Coulthard has played a number of roles on British television, including The Bill, Holby City, Sex, the City and Me, and the lead role in drama short Goodbye, Hello. Coulthard also starred in the 1993 film The Cement Garden, and the stageplay Keeler in the title role of Christine Keeler. More recently she has played Kelly Tophet in the US TV series The Last Ship and the title role in independent film Josephine.

She played Maisie Wylde, introduced to the ITV1 soap opera Emmerdale by series producer Anita Turner, from February 2009 to January 2011.

She was a voice and motion capture actress for the virtual reality game Lone Echo's main character Cpt. Olivia Rhodes. In a March 2019 article in Upload VR, Jamie Feltham referred to Cpt. Olivia Rhodes as the best non-player character in a virtual reality game to date.

== Personal life ==
Coulthard married Owen Dyke, bassplayer of White Rose Movement on 1 August 2010.

== Awards and nominations ==
Year	Award	Category	Result	Ref.
2010	The British Soap Awards	Sexiest Female	Nominated	
2010	TV Choice Awards	Best Soap Newcomer	Nominated	
2010	Inside Soap Awards	Sexiest Female	Nominated	
