= Anita Turner =

British television producer

- Occupations: Script editor; television producer
- Years active: 2002–present
- Employers: ITV; CBBC
- Notable work: Emmerdale

Anita Turner is a British script editor and television producer. From 2008 to 2009, Turner was the series producer of the British television soap opera Emmerdale. She left the role after it was reported that her leadership on the soap had resulted in cast morale dropping, as well as being criticised for the controversial sacking of a child actor. Turner has since gone on to produce a series of the CBBC series Rocket's Island, as well as working as a script editor on various CBBC projects.

== Career ==
Turner initially worked as a script editor for the ITV soap operaEmmerdale and held that role for three years. She eventually replaced Kathleen Beedles as the series producer of Emmerdale in early 2008. She quickly "made her mark by axing characters and changing storylines", and later that year, it was reported by Digital Spy that cast morale was down since Turner had become the series producer. She also received criticism for firing a child actor, Benjamin Shooter, who portrayed Samson Dingle, for crying on set. Shooter's mother felt that her son had been treated like a "prop" and criticised Turner for allowing her young child to be in "horrifying scenes" including armed robber Sam Dingle (James Hooton) turning himself in to the police. On 15 January 2009, it was announced that Turner would leave her role as series producer of the show.

In 2015, she was a producer on the CBBC series Rocket's Island, as well as producing an episode of Jamie Johnson. She also worked as a script editor on several CBBC series including Stepping Up, The Sparticle Mystery and So Awkward.
