= James Sutton (actor) =

English actor (born 1983)

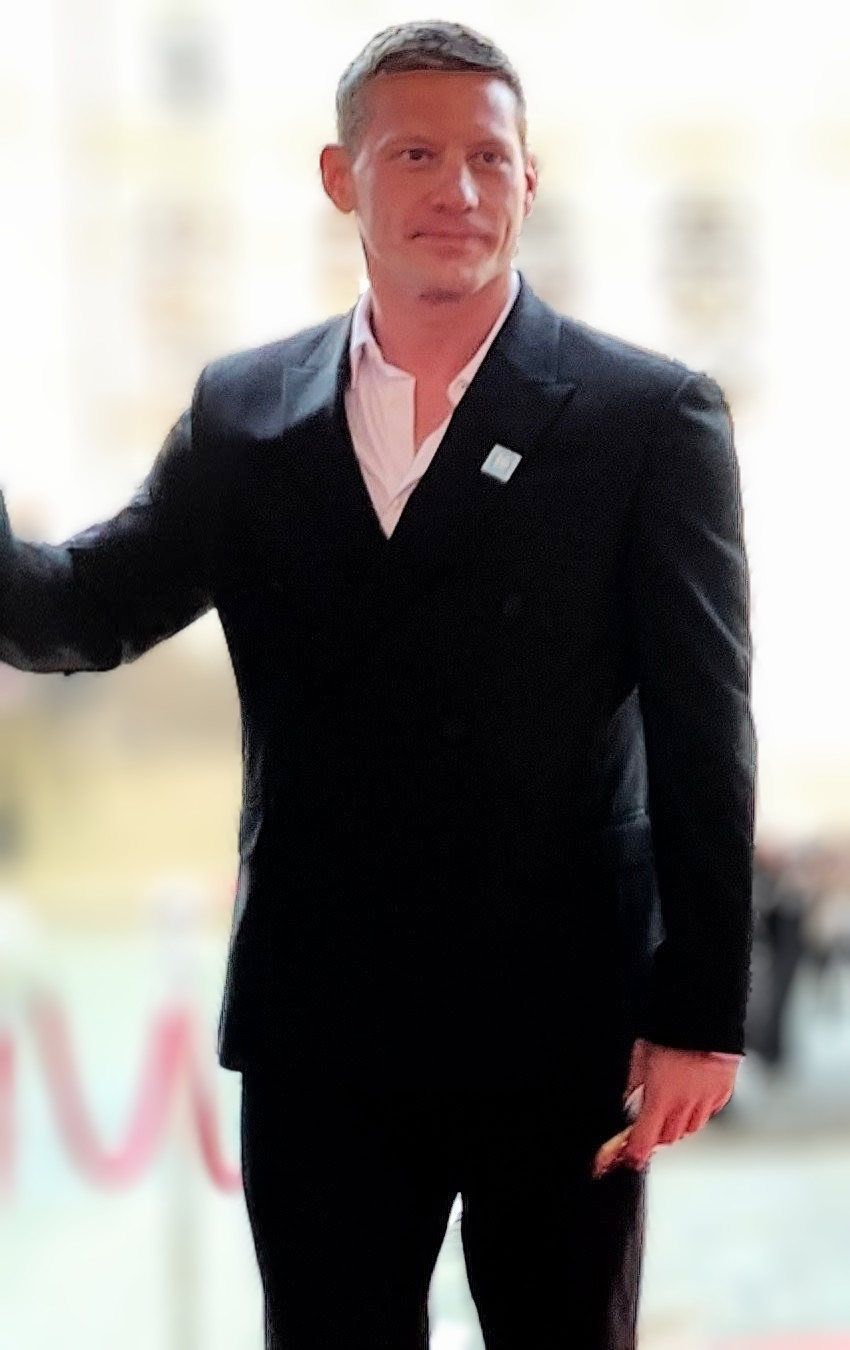
- Sutton in October 2025
- Born: James Cook; 31 January 1983 (age 43); Sutton Coldfield, West Midlands, England
- Education: Royal Welsh College of Music and Drama
- Occupation: Actor
- Years active: 2006–present
- Spouse: Rachael Collin (m. 2018; div. 2023)

James Cook (born 31 January 1983), better known as James Sutton, is an English actor known as John Paul McQueen on Hollyoaks (2006–2008, 2012–2017, 2019–2026) and Ryan Lamb on Emmerdale (2009–2011).

== Early life ==
Sutton was born James Cook on 31 January 1983 in Sutton Coldfield, Birmingham, the son of Jeanette and Donald Cook. It is from his hometown that he derived the stage name "Sutton". He has a younger brother and two younger sisters. He grew up in Haughton, Staffordshire, and attended King Edward VI School in Stafford. At the age of 14, he moved to Newport, Shropshire, where he attended the Burton Borough School. He went on to study drama at the Royal Welsh College of Music and Drama in Cardiff.

== Career ==
Prior to Hollyoaks, Sutton had roles in the Dream Team spin-off Dream Team 80s, playing Terry Glover, and in Lynda La Plante's Trial and Retribution X, playing a character called Barry Milne.

In September 2006 he joined the cast of Hollyoaks as John Paul McQueen. During this portrayal, his character came out as being gay and started having an affair with his best friend, Craig Dean. The storyline was nominated for, and won, many awards. He left the soap on-screen in September 2008. In Sutton's first post-Hollyoaks role, he guest starred as Eli Taylor who suffered from narcolepsy and cataplexy on the BBC series Casualty, in the episode titled 'Doing The Right Thing' which aired 13 December 2008.

On 23 March 2009, it was announced that Sutton would join the cast of ITV1's Emmerdale. Sutton played the role of mechanic Ryan Daniel Lamb, son of newcomer Faye Lamb and already established character Mark Wylde. Ryan's first appearance was on 15 June 2009. Speaking to Tis Yourself podcast in 2026, he said he didn't think his character made much of an impact on the show but praised the crew and cast saying it was a great place to work.

On 8 February 2011, it was announced that Sutton would leave Emmerdale after approximately two years in the show. His last day on the show was 18 March 2011. His last episode was aired on Tuesday 26 April 2011.

In 2011 he took on the role of Orsino from Twelfth Night in the BBC Learning project "Off By Heart Shakespeare" and delivered the speech "If music be the food of love, play on".

Sutton made a brief appearance in the second series of Bedlam on Sky Living together with Lacey Turner (EastEnders) in Spring 2012. His character was a paramedic called Andy.

Sutton made two guest appearances in episodes of the BBC1 series Doctors on Friday 9 March 2012 "Firestarter" and Monday 8 January 2019 “The Affair”. He also made a guest appearances in the second series of the hit ITV1 drama series Scott & Bailey which returned to the screens on Monday 12 March 2012 and Holby City on BBC1.

His return to Hollyoaks was announced on Digital Spy on 12 October 2012, with the character of Jean Paul returning to the show on 18 December 2012., before leaving the show in 2017.

In May 2012, he announced on Twitter that he had a new company, Broken Leg Workshops, which runs pop-up workshops for new actors offering help and advice of the kind he wished he had received when he first entered the business. The first workshop was held in Liverpool, followed by Manchester and Leeds.

Sutton met playwright Ian Salmon through The Anfield Wrap and this led to Sutton appearing in Salmon's play Venus Rising at the Hope Street Theatre in Liverpool in 2018.

In July 2019, Sutton reprised his role as Jean Paul in Hollyoaks, before departing the show in March 2026. Speaking on Tis Yourself podcast, he said he was glad he returned before Covid, but it became clear from 2024 onwards the writers had nothing for his character. He cited the fact that they did not put him in any scenes with his onscreen sister Mercedes after her cancer diagnosis as one of the final acts that made it clear to him he needed to leave.

In April 2026, Sutton announced that he had joined OnlyFans.

== Personal life ==
Sutton is a fan of Liverpool FC and a regular contributor to The Anfield Wrap.

== Filmography ==
| Year | Title | Role | Notes |
|---|---|---|---|
| 2006 | Trial & Retribution | Barry Milne | Episode: "Sins of the Father" |
| 2006 | Dream Team 80s | Terry Glover | |
| 2006–2008, 2012–2017, 2019–2026 | Hollyoaks | John Paul McQueen | Regular role (796 episodes) |
| 2008 | Casualty | Eli Taylor | Episode: "Doing the Right Thing" |
| 2009–2011 | Emmerdale | Ryan Lamb | |
| 2012 | Scott & Bailey | Gavin Bishop | Series 2, Episode 6 |
| 2012 | Holby City | Floyd Shepherd | Episode: "A Woman's Work" |
| 2012 | Bedlam | Andy | Series 2 |
| 2020 | Hollyoaks Later | John Paul McQueen | 2020 special |

== Awards and nominations ==
Hollyoaks was named Broadcast of the Year at the 2007 Stonewall Awards, held at London's Victoria and Albert Museum. The award was given for the portrayal of James Sutton's and Guy Burnet's gay affair storyline. Stonewall, an organisation that campaigns for LGBT equality, praised the show for its "sympathetic and convincing handling" of the "gritty and emotional" storyline.

Sutton was nominated for 'Sexiest Male', 'Best Actor' and 'Best Dramatic Performance' for The British Soap Awards 2007. He had been short-listed along with Gerard McCarthy (Kris Fisher) for 'Best Newcomer' for his role as John Paul McQueen, however McCarthy was chosen for the final nomination.

Sutton was nominated for 'Best Actor' and 'Sexiest Male' at the 2007 Inside Soap Awards, for 'Best Storyline' for "John Paul falls for Craig and comes out as gay", and, with Guy Burnet (Craig Dean) for 'Best Couple'. He did not win in any of the categories. Sutton was shortlisted for 'Most Popular Actor' at the National Television Awards 2007, alongside Charlie Clements (EastEnders), David Tennant (Doctor Who) and Antony Cotton (Coronation Street). The awards were voted for by the public and the ceremony took place on 31 October 2007. The award was won by David Tennant. Sutton was voted 'Most Popular Actor' and the John Paul/Craig storyline won 'Storyline of the Year'. Sutton was again nominated for the award of Best Newcomer, losing to Coronation Street's Craig Gazey.
