= Sam Dingle =

Fictional character from Emmerdale

- Emmerdale character
- Portrayed by: James Hooton
- Duration: 1995–1998, 2000–present
- First appearance: Episode 1947; 14 February 1995
- Introduced by: Keith Richardson
- Spin-off appearances: Emmerdale: The Dingles, For Richer for Poorer (2010)
In-universe information
- Occupation: Caretaker; Sales executive; Farmhand; Gamekeeper; Waiter
- Father: Zak Dingle
- Mother: Nellie Dingle
- Stepmother: Lisa Dingle
- Brothers: Nathan Dingle; Ben Dingle; Butch Dingle
- Sisters: Tina Dingle
- Half-brothers: Cain Dingle
- Half-sisters: Belle Dingle
- Wife: Alice Dingle (2006); Lydia Hart (2020–present)
- Sons: Samson Dingle
- Granddaughters: Esther Spencer
- Grandfathers: Jedediah Dingle
- Grandmothers: Peg Dingle
- Uncles: Shadrach Dingle; Albert Dingle; Caleb Dingle; Ezra Dingle
- Nephews: Nate Robinson; Kyle Dingle; Isaac Dingle Vinny Dingle
- Nieces: Debbie Dingle
- First cousins: Mandy Dingle; Marlon Dingle; Eli Dingle; Chas Dingle; Gennie Walker; Lilith Dingle; Del Dingle
- Other relatives: Charity Dingle; Noah Dingle; Sarah Sugden; Jack Sugden; Aaron Dingle; Nate Robinson; Leyla Sugden

Sam Dingle is a fictional character from the British ITV soap opera Emmerdale, played by James Hooton. He made his first appearance in the episode broadcast on 14 February 1995.

== Casting ==
Actor James Hooton was cast as Sam in December 1994. He decided to shave off his hair before his audition after learning what the role would entail. He commented "I thought, 'that will get it for me' and it did." The producers agreed, as the short haircut made Hooton look "tough", which was ideal for the character. Sam was introduced as a prominent member of the "roguish" Dingle family. Of his casting, Hooton stated "I love being part of Emmerdale. The Dingles are just like my real family now." He was originally supposed to be in the serial for eight episodes. His first contract ended in March 1995 and he hoped that it would be renewed, so he would become as well known as Annie Sugden and Seth Armstrong. He later received a contract extension to July 1996.

== Development ==
On his character profile on the ITV website, Sam is described as "a simple, sweet-natured man who can easily be taken advantage of". It is noted that he loves his family, and that he wants to "win their approval with his enthusiasm". He is billed as a "loyal, thoughtful, honest" character that "stands up for what is right". The profile states that he enjoys nature and working outside, and dislikes people thinking that he is "stupid". It adds that Sam has "one of the longest police records of anyone" on Emmerdale, despite his "innocent soul".

In 2010, actor Hooton spoke to Holy Soap about portraying Sam. He explained that since Sam is so different from him in real life, he likes to "hide behind the character", and that he enjoys portraying a character that is different from how he "might be perceived in real life". He stated that due to his differences from Sam, he does not get noticed in public, unlike his co-stars. In 2018, Hooton revealed that there were periods of time where he did not enjoy working on Emmerdale, and credited co-star Blick, who portrays his on-screen love interest Lydia, for making him enjoy it again. He commented: "It's been 23 years off and on I've been involved in the show, and obviously a lot of water goes under that bridge over that time. I've gone through many years when I've not enjoyed the job as much as I might have done, and it's been a bit of a renaissance period for me as I'm enjoying the job more so than I ever have done. And I think that's in part down to working with Karen and what she brings to the table." He confirmed that in those times, he considered leaving the soap, but decided against it since he had carved a career as Sam. A year later, he reflected on 25 years of his character. He expanded on his unhappiness, revealing that a few years into his tenure on the soap, a "young and ambitious" Hooton met with the then-executive producer of Emmerdale to discuss his future on the soap. He felt "sidelined" on the soap, and asked the executive producer if there was a chance of Sam being more involved in storylines, to which the producer told him that he would never receive a big storyline. Reflecting on his time since then, he expressed his joy that his feelings about working on Emmerdale had improved. Hooton went on to explain that for "a long-standing actor in a soap", being killed off is always a worry, since they are only contracted on 12-month contracts, which are renewed annually. He added that if he was written out, he would be "gutted", stating: "it's definitely the best job for me".

As a response to the COVID-19 pandemic, Sam and Lydia star in a standalone "lockdown" episode in 2020. Hooton stated that it is "not all fun and games", to reflect lockdown not being a fun process for others. He explained that there is "light-hearted jovial stuff" in the episode, as well as "motional and serious stuff". This is due to Sam's worries about Lydia having Huntington's disease, so he worries that the virus will have more of an effect on her than anyone else. He noted that the episode is "journey for both of them", and praised the writing. Hooton opined that his character deals with lockdown well, as he does the shopping and continues to work, but his "one overriding objective" is to protect Lydia from the virus, as he sees her as vulnerable. He notes that Lydia does not agree with Sam's protection of her.

== Storylines ==
Sam arrives in Emmerdale village following his release from a young offenders institute. He falsely claims to have kidnapped Robert Sugden (Christopher Smith) in order to claim ransom money from Robert's family. He gets involved in several dodgy schemes with his family, one of which is taking part in an armed robbery with his uncle Albert Dingle (Bobby Knutt). However, they are both caught by the police and subsequently jailed. Sam is released from prison two years later and he returns to the village for his brother Butch Dingle's (Paul Loughran) funeral. Sam serves another prison sentence for accidentally hitting pensioner Edna Birch (Shirley Stelfox) with a car. He is held in the same prison as his distant relative, Solomon Dingle (Paul Shane).

Sam begins a relationship with Alice Wilson (Ursula Holden-Gill) and they later leave Emmerdale to start life on their own farm in Norfolk. They return to Emmerdale soon afterwards, when Sam discovers Alice is pregnant. Alice gives birth to their son via caesarean section, so she can start treatment for cancer. Sam's younger half-sister, Belle Dingle (Eden Taylor-Draper), accidentally names the baby Samson Dingle (Bradley Milnes) when she mistakes "Sam's son" for his name. Sam and Alice marry upon discovering her cancer is terminal. Eventually, Alice becomes so weak that she is unable to hold Samson so, at Alice's request, Sam obtains morphine from his cousin Eli Dingle (Joe Gilgun) and gives Alice an overdose, ending her life. The police get involved when Detective constable Martin Crowe (Graeme Hawley), hears Ashley Thomas (John Middleton) tell Diane Sugden (Elizabeth Estensen) that he believes that Sam had helped Alice die. Martin opens a murder investigation and when the police come to arrest Sam at Wishing Well Cottage, the Dingles barricade themselves inside. After eventually gaining entry and arresting Sam, Del Dingle (Hayley Tamaddon) tells them that she helped Alice die, so she is arrested too. Soon, all the Dingles admit to helping Alice die in order to protect Sam. With the family worried that Social Services will remove Samson if Sam confesses, his half-brother Cain Dingle (Jeff Hordley) asks Sam to describe Alice's death to him in as much detail as possible. Cain tells the police he helped Alice die and they charge him with the crime.

Sam is arrested for drug possession after Eli persuades him to be his courier, so he and Samson are able to live in the village. Sam is afraid he will lose Samson when the police charge him, and he runs away with his son, but soon turns himself in. This is not the only incident that alarms the Dingles and social services – whilst living at Dale View, Samson leaves the house and is struck by Val Pollard's (Charlie Hardwick) car. He also drinks an alcoholic drink left lying around by Daz Eden's (Luke Tittensor) girlfriend, Penny Drury (Amelia Sefton). Sam rushes him to hospital, where Samson recovers.

Sam works at Butler's Farm, helping with Jo Stiles' (Roxanne Pallett) goats, but Andy Sugden (Kelvin Fletcher) soon sells them and fires Sam out of jealously. Sam secures a job at Eric Pollard's (Chris Chittell) factory, which he plans to sell to the King family. Eric lets his employees believe he is going out of business. When he tells Sam that he wishes the factory would go up in smoke, Sam takes him at his word and he and Eli set fire to the factory. When Andy goes away, Sam begins helping Jo out at the farm and develops feelings for her. Lisa Dingle (Jane Cox) tries to warn him off, but Sam ignores her, hoping he might have a chance with Jo. When Jo invites Sam for dinner, he misconstrues it as a date and she is shocked when he tries to kiss her. Jo lets him down gently, and Andy sees them share a hug. He confronts the pair and beats them both up, putting Jo in hospital. Lisa, his father Zak Dingle (Steve Halliwell), and uncle Shadrach Dingle (Andy Devine) see his bruises and after treating his cuts, warn Sam to stay away from Jo and Andy. Zak also tells Andy that while Sam was wrong to have approached Jo like that, Andy was wrong to have beaten him up. Jo and Andy's deteriorating marriage becomes common knowledge, and Sam warns Debbie Dingle (Charley Webb) about what is happening, so she can keep an eye on her and Andy's daughter Sarah Sugden (Sophia Amber Moore).

Sam finds Ukrainian immigrant Olena Petrovich (Carolin Stoltz) hiding in the Dingle's barn and helps tend to her wounded leg, while keeping her presence a secret. Eventually, he convinces Zak and Lisa to take her in and Olena helps out around the house. Sam persuades Eric to give her a job at the B&B and Sam began to fall in love with Olena. Zak asks Eli to spy on Sam and Olena, in case she is a gold-digger, but he decides that Olena is genuine and convinces Zak to let Sam make his own choices. Zak gives Sam his blessing, but as Sam's behaviour becomes more intense towards her, it is obvious that Olena does not reciprocate his feelings and she becomes uncomfortable around him. When Shadrach floods the Dingle house, Olena goes to stay with Eli and Marlon Dingle (Mark Charnock). Sam misses Olena and keeps visiting her at work, but Olena is distant. As Lisa, Sam and Olena are driving to pick up some building materials, they are pulled over by the police and Olena thinks they are looking for her. She and Sam flee into the woods, but are seen by the police. To give them a chance to get away, Lisa punches an officer and is arrested. Sam becomes jealous of Olena and Eli's close bond. When Olena tells him that she misses her son, Sam proposes, but Olena turns him down and says that does not have the right papers and would be deported. Sam asks Cain to obtain a fake passport for Olena and assures her that everything will be okay. Olena and Eli take this to mean that he accepts that Olena does not return his feelings. When Olena fails to attend Lisa's homecoming party, Sam goes looking for her and sees her kissing Eli. He then reports her to Border Control and watches as she is arrested.

When a drunken Eli accuses various people of reporting Olena, Sam admits that he is responsible and Eli throws a glass at his head. Sam breaks down in tears, telling his father that if he tried hard enough, Olena might have taken a chance on him. Zak comforts his son, but Sam feels guilty and decides to leave the village. Lisa persuades him to stay, saying that he cannot not sleep rough with a toddler. However, Eli blasts Sam for ruining Olena's life, before revealing that Zak had already told her to leave, or be deported. Sam is livid with his father for interfering and refuses to speak to Zak. He tries to apologise to Eric for getting him a £7000 fine for hiring Olena, but Eric refuses to forgive him. Zak convinces Eric to forgive Sam and Eric advises Sam to forgive his father. Sam tries to make amends to Olena by paying £200 into a bank account for her, before he finds Eric unconscious at the B&B, unaware that Eli had just robbed the B&B. Suspicions are raised over the missing money and Sam is accused of stealing the money. Eric tries to get Sam to tell him where the money for Olena came from, but Sam lies. Eli eventually confesses and apologises to Sam, before going on the run. Sam admits that he got the money through poaching from his employer, Natasha Wylde (Amanda Donohoe). Sam later discovers the body of Natasha's husband Mark Wylde (Maxwell Caulfield) in the woods, after his dog digs him up.

Sam becomes very close to Rachel Breckle (Gemma Oaten) and they eventually begin dating. He supports her throughout her pregnancy and they moves in together, but he and Samson move out when her family moves in after Megan Macey (Gaynor Faye) evicts them. Sam and Rachel's relationship ends when she is forced to leave the village by Sam's cousin, Charity Dingle (Emma Atkins). Sam later begins a relationship with Tracy Shankley (Amy Walsh), but reunites with Rachel when she returns. However, their reunion does not last long due as Rachel, who is going through a custody battle with Jai Sharma (Chris Bisson), starts hitting Sam. Rachel leaves for Liverpool with sister. Sam struggles when it is revealed that Zak has been having an affair with their lodger, Joanie Wright (Denise Black). The family excommunicate Zak, but Sam cannot cut Zak out of his life. Things for the family become worse when Aaron Livesy (Danny Miller) reveals that he was sexually abused as a child, and Cain instructs Sam not to tell Zak. However, Belle eventually tells him the truth. Sam begins talking to his father again, despite Lisa beginning divorce proceedings. When running to get help after Megan goes into labour, Sam is accidentally shot by Joanie. He is taken to the hospital and makes a full recovery. He later sets up a business called Scarborough Trader's in Scarborough. Sam is attacked in the grounds of Wishing Well Cottage by Belle's boyfriend, Lachlan White.

== Reception ==
For his portrayal of Sam, Hooton received a nomination for Best Actor at the 2006 Inside Soap Awards. In 2020, Sam and Lydia's wedding was longlisted for Feel-Good Moment.

A critic for the Daily Post commented on his dim-witted nature, writing "Sam Dingle isn't exactly known for his razorsharp wit and macho persona; neither is he much of a ladies' man. In recent weeks his worrying tendency to fail to think things through saw him burn down Eric's factory, and now he has got the wrong end of the stick again. When Jo shows him some kindness, Sam gets the wrong impression that some of his non-existent charms have rubbed off on the beleaguered farmer's wife."
