= Kim Thomson =

British actress

Kim Ellen Thomson (born October 1959) is a British actress who has appeared on stage, television and film since the early 1980s in both the United Kingdom and the United States.

== Early life ==
Thomson was born in October 1959, although other sources have said in 1960 and 1964, in Scotland or Bath, Somerset, England to a Scottish father and Irish mother. Her parents separated when she was three years old, and she was raised in Surrey by her father's parents, who were originally from Alloa. At the age of six, she was sent to a boarding school for five years. Much later she went on record to say boarding schools should be abolished.

She trained as an actress at the Central School of Speech and Drama.

== Career ==
Thomson's most noticeable mainstream role was as Lesley Bainbridge in the BBC sitcom Brush Strokes. In 1987, Thomson appeared in the final episode of the TV series Tales of the Unexpected, as hotel maid Elly Somerton alongside Topol, who starred as the lead character Professor Max Kelada.

Thomson shared her first lead in Stealing Heaven (1988) with Derek de Lint and Denholm Elliott. In its review, the highly regarded monthly film journal Films and Filming wrote, "Kim Thomson's Heloïse moves with delicate poise, a heroine worthy of Rossetti or Burne-Jones, with vivacity and intelligence." She played young Estella in the 1989 television series Great Expectations, directed by Kevin Connor, in which Miss Havisham was portrayed by Jean Simmons, who had played Estella in the 1946 film version. Also in 1989, Thomson performed on stage as Cordelia in King Lear, directed by Jonathan Miller. The British Theatre Yearbook described Thomson's Cordelia as "exquisite in beauty, tender in care, full of youthful integrity."

In 1991, she played Kitty Winter opposite Jeremy Brett in "The Illustrious Client," an episode of popular television series The Case-Book of Sherlock Holmes. In 1992, Thomson was the leading lady of the TV series Virtual Murder, followed by another leading role in 1994's costume drama series, The Wanderer.

In 1997, Thomson took on the role of Lady Chiltern in An Ideal Husband, of which the Theatre Record stated, "Others have played this pure, cool, idealistic, demanding role with more authority and finesse, but she is simply right for it". In 2001, she appeared as Irina in the West End theatre production of Uncle Vanya directed by Peter Gill. In 2004, she played a society reporter in The Princess Diaries 2: Royal Engagement (2004).

During 2008, Thomson had a recurring role in ITV's detective show The Bill, as barrister Naomi Woods, wife of DC Jacob Banks. From 2009 to 2011, she was a regular cast member of the ITV1 soap opera Emmerdale in the role of Faye Lamb.

== Personal life ==
In 2010, Thomson graduated from the University of London with a degree in politics, philosophy and history.

== Film and television ==
- The Lords of Discipline (1983) - Girlfriend
- Party Party – Brenda (1983)
- Screamtime – Lady Anne (1983)
- Cover Her Face – Sally Jupp (4 episodes, 1985)
- Lovejoy (1986) "The Firefly Cage" – Nicola Page
- Brush Strokes – Lesley Bainbridge (1986)
- The Life and Loves of a She-Devil – Elsie Flowers (1986)
- The Ruth Rendell Mysteries – "Wolf to the Slaughter" - Linda Grover (1987)
- A Killing on the Exchange (1987)
- Stealing Heaven – Heloise (1988)
- Tales of the Unexpected – Elly Somerton (1988) - episode (9/10) "Mr Know-All"
- The Tall Guy – Cheryl (1989)
- Minder – "Fatal Impression" Sylvie (1989)
- Great Expectations – Estella (1989)
- Jekyll & Hyde – Lucy Harris (1990)
- Perry Mason: The Case of the Desperate Deception — Cathy Bramwell (1990)
- Inspector Morse – "The Sins of the Fathers" Helen Radford (1990)
- Hands of a Murderer (TV film) – Sophie DeVere (1990)
- Murder 101 – Francesca Lavin (1991)
- The Case-Book of Sherlock Holmes: "The Illustrious Client" (1991) – Kitty Winter
- Virtual Murder – Samantha Valentine (1992)
- The Wanderer – Beatrice (1994)
- Loved By You – Becky Edwards (1997)
- The 10th Kingdom – Queen Riding Hood III (2000)
- Midsomer Murders – Janet Reason (2001)
- The Princess Diaries 2: Royal Engagement (2004) – Elsie Kentworthy, reporter
- Rosemary & Thyme (2006) – Andrea
- Secret Diary of a Call Girl (2007) – Della
- 1408 (2007) – Desk Clerk
- Messages (2007) – Frances Beale
- The Street (2007) – Pat Tinsey
- Judge John Deed (2007) – Marie Madsen
- The Bill (2008) – Naomi Woods
- New Tricks (2008) – Tiffany Barker
- The Green Green Grass (2009) – Antonia Page
- Taggart (2009) – Phyllis
- Emmerdale – Faye Lamb (2009–2011)
- Casualty (2009) – Amber
- Holby City (2014) – Catherine O'Malley

== Theatre ==
Theatre	Play	Role	Director
Phoenix Theatre	Alan Bleasdale's Are You Lonesome Tonight?	Priscilla Presley	Robin Lefevre
Haymarket Theatre & Old Vic	An Ideal Husband	Lady Chiltern	Peter Hall
Old Vic Theatre (1989)	King Lear	Cordelia	Jonathan Miller
Theatre Royal, Bath	Present Laughter	Joanna	Dominic Dromgoole
Battersea Arts Centre	The Stranger	Madame Y	Michael Billington
Battersea Arts Centre	Traveller Without Luggage	Valentine	Nicholas de Jongh
Field Day Theatre Company	Uncle Vanya	Elena	Peter Gill
Watford Palace Theatre	Wedding Song	Stella	Michael Attenborough
