= List of Emmerdale characters introduced in 2010 =

The following is a list of characters that first appeared in the British soap opera Emmerdale in 2010, by order of first appearance. All characters were introduced by the soap's executive producer, Steve Frost.

== Charlie Haynes ==
Charlie Haynes
- Emmerdale character
- Portrayed by: George Costigan
- First appearance: 8 March 2010
- Last appearance: 23 July 2010
- Introduced by: Steve Frost
In-universe information
- Occupation: Businessman
- Daughters: Melissa Haynes; Chloe Haynes

Charles "Charlie" Haynes, played by George Costigan, is an old friend of Rodney Blackstock (Patrick Mower). He made his first on-screen appearance on 8 March 2010.

Charlie was first seen when Rodney was on a date with a glamorous woman, revealing that he and Rodney were friends years ago but lost contact. The next day, Charlie and Rodney were having a drink in the Woolpack, and Diane Sugden (Elizabeth Estensen) realised that this was the 'famous' Charlie that Rodney used to talk about years ago. Charlie clearly fancies Diane, making Douglas Potts (Duncan Preston) dislike him, seeing him as a rival for Diane's affections.

Charlie returns from France with presents for Diane and Douglas. When Douglas sees that his present is a box of cigars, he tells Charlie he doesn't smoke so Charlie buys the drinks to apologise. Later that week, Diane invites Charlie to dinner as Douglas had to work late. After the meal, the pair kiss. A couple of weeks later, Diane and Charlie have become a couple and go to France on holiday to see where Charlie lives, taking Diane's stepdaughter, Victoria Sugden (Isabel Hodgins). Weeks on, Charlie tells Diane he is returning to France for good so when Diane has to decide whether to stay in Emmerdale or move to France. She decides to go to France with Charlie, despite his having an inoperable brain tumour.

Charlie returned on 23 July while Diane and Val Pollard (Charlie Hardwick) are searching for him. They go to his chateau and ask to see Charlie, but no one appears to have heard of, let alone seen him. Diane and Val wonder what is going on. They then ask to see the owner (thinking this will get them further) but then meet the truthful owner who also has not heard of Charlie. Diane finally puts two and two together and she breaks down in Val's arms, devastated at Charlie's actions, leaving her practically penniless. Charlie is seen later on in a restaurant with another woman returning a handbag, which was seemingly stolen by a mugger, much similar to the scenario with Diane. This scene confirms the fact that Charlie is, in fact, a conman, and preys on lonely women for their cash.

== Roz Fielding ==
Roz Fielding
- Emmerdale character
- Portrayed by: Kirsty-Leigh Porter
- Duration: 2010–2012
- First appearance: 22 April 2010
- Last appearance: 24 February 2012
- Introduced by: Steve Frost
In-universe information
- Occupation: Factory worker Textile pattern designer

Roz Fielding, played by Kirsty-Leigh Porter, made her first on screen appearance on 22 April 2010. Roz is Holly Barton's (Sophie Powles) best friend. She departed on 17 August 2011. On 15 January 2012, Susan Hill of the Daily Star announced Porter would be making a brief return to Emmerdale in 2012 for Holly's exit storyline. Roz returned to Emmerdale on 24 February 2012.

Roz is a friend of Holly Barton's from college. At first she appeared to be just a typical normal teenager but is later seen to be giving drugs to Holly. On Holly's 19th birthday Roz gives her some drugs in The Woolpack, when Holly's parents find out that Holly has been kicked out of college they confront her and tell Roz to leave. Holly is later banned from seeing or calling Roz. When Holly's father, John (James Thornton), accuses Holly of stealing ketamine, Holly stays at Roz's house. Holly later swaps the ketamine with Roz for cocaine. Holly later runs away from home and her parents John and Moira (Natalie J. Robb) go and see Roz thinking that Holly is staying at her house again but Roz tells them that she has not heard from Holly.

When Holly later returns home, John calls Roz and asks her to come and see Holly to give her some emotional support to help her cure her drug addiction. Roz and Holly go for a walk in the fields and talk but Holly then begins asking Roz for more drugs and they argue. John and Holly's brother Adam (Adam Thomas) witness the argument and Roz tells them about Holly's request for drugs. In November Roz returns again to see Holly but is sent away by Moira and Adam. She returns the following week and John reluctantly lets her in to speak to Holly and this appears to make her feel better. Roz tells Moira that she believes Holly is doing better than she expected.

The following day Roz returns but Adam confronts her and they argue. Moira overhears the argument whilst tending to Holly. Adam orders Roz to leave. Roz hides in the barn and waits for Moira to leave. She then sneaks into the house to see Holly and attempts to speak to her. Holly is asleep and Roz realises that she has taken more heroin. Moira returns and tells Roz to leave. Roz tries to convince Moira that Holly has taken more drugs but Moira dismisses her claims. Adam enters the house and overhears their argument. Believing Roz, Adam tries to ring John to tell him about the situation but Moira tries to stop him. Adam and Roz both realise that Moira has been buying heroin for Holly and Roz leaves in shock.

Roz returns on 16 December to see how Holly is doing. Moira apologises to Roz for misjudging her and Roz accepts it. Holly comes downstairs and is pleased to see Roz. Roz remarks that Holly looks better than when she last saw her. Holly asks Moira if Roz can take her to the clinic to get her methadone but Roz and Moira both decline, thinking it is too soon for her. Roz offers to come with her and Moira so they can catch up with each other's news and Moira agrees. When they return home Roz and Holly sit on the sofa, and after Moira leaves the house, Roz asks Holly how she is getting on and Holly tells her that she still suffers from withdrawal symptoms but doesn't want to hurt her family any more than she already has. Roz tells Holly that she has also given up using drugs. After her father throws her out, Roz subsequently moves in with the Bartons at Butler's Farm and later secures a job at Sharma and Sharma sweet factory.

Roz later becomes disillusioned with her job and takes a strong dislike to her boss Nikhil Sharma (Rik Makarem). After feeling that Nikhil has been treating the factory workers badly Roz instigates a strike. Nikhil's brother Jai (Chris Bisson) manages to convince Roz and the other employees to return to work. However, Roz reveals to Holly that a friend has offered her a job in Bradford at a textile factory, designing patterns for products and tells her that she has been offered a flat there from a friend. Roz later calls Nikhil and resigns from her job. She packs her belongings up and after bidding farewell to Holly and the Bartons, she leaves Butler's Farm and departs the village. Roz returns to the village to support Holly at John's funeral. She reveals that she is planning to move to London.

== Laura Prior ==
Laura Prior
- Emmerdale character
- Portrayed by: Elaine Glover
- Duration: 2010–2011
- First appearance: 27 July 2010
- Last appearance: 17 February 2011
- Introduced by: Steve Frost
In-universe information
- Occupation: Detective Constable

Detective Constable Laura Prior is a police officer investigating the murder of Mark Wylde (Maxwell Caulfield) with DS Nick Henshall (Michael McKell) after Mark's body was discovered by Sam Dingle (James Hooton). After questioning the Wylde and Lamb families, the detectives arrest Nathan Wylde (Lyndon Ogbourne) on suspicion of his father's murder but is released, due to a lack of evidence. Nathan's half-brother, Ryan Lamb (James Sutton), is arrested after Nathan frames him by planting the murder weapon at the garage where he works and a gold chain with Ryan's DNA at the murder scene. After questioning Ryan, Prior and Henshall charge him with Mark's murder.

Prior returns on 14 January 2011 to investigate the arson attack in which Viv Hope (Deena Payne) and Terry Woods (Billy Hartman) are killed. She is unaware that Nick Henshall is responsible for the blaze but his frequent mood swings make Prior suspect he is overworked. Together, they question Katie Sugden (Sammy Winward), Chas Dingle (Lucy Pargeter) and Gennie Walker (Sian Reese-Williams). Katie tells Prior that she thinks the arsonist has also been making prank telephone calls and broke into their home. Chas, however, thinks her ex-boyfriend, Carl King (Tom Lister), could be responsible but Gennie believes Andy Sugden (Kelvin Fletcher) is the culprit. After stating that Carl and Andy will be interviewed, the detectives leave. Henshall and Prior go to Butler's Farm and question Andy at the police station, where he protests his innocence. After the interview, Prior remarks to Henshall that they have no evidence against Andy, only hearsay and speculation.

On 20 January, Prior attends Terry's funeral with Henshall and notices Henshall's discomfort, asking if he is all right but he brushes off her concerns. On 1 February, Andy goes to the police station and makes a complaint about Henshall harassing him. Initially Prior insists that Henshall is just doing his job and has not broken any rules until he tells her Henshall and Katie are dating and he suspects Henshall is trying to frame him. Prior is surprised by Andy's revelation and confronts Henshall, who admits his relationship with Katie. Realising Henshall is jeopardizing the case, Prior reports him and Henshall is taken off the case. He angrily confronts Prior in the locker room, frightening her with his rage, accusing her of ruining his further promotion chances and being jealous of Katie. The following day, Prior goes to Victoria Cottage to review Katie, Chas and Gennie's witness statements and finds Henshall there. Katie tells her that on the night of the attack, she had been out for dinner with Henshall and after a confrontation with Andy, they ended their relationship.

Prior also visits Carl to review his statement and discovers a key piece of information missing from Carl's original statement. Carl had revealed that he nearly crashed into a car as he drove into the village in his van, just before he saw the fire. Carl says that he was not shown his statement to sign, surprising Prior, as this was police procedure. On 7 February, Prior confronts Henshall in The Woolpack and demands an explanation but he insists that he did not think the evidence was reliable. Prior warns Henshall that if she discovers the truth then she will not defend him.

On 15 February, Henshall spots Prior speaking to DC Darren Foster at the police station. He tells Henshall that Prior has found a CCTV camera across the road from the shop where the phone used to make the nuisance calls to Victoria Cottage was bought from. They find footage of Henshall leaving the shop, making Prior search for Henshall and warn Katie. On arrival in the village, Chas tells her that they have gone, first to Henshall's house for his luggage and then away for a while. Prior gives Chas her mobile number and asks her to call if either Katie or Henshall contact her. She and Foster go to Henshall's house and knock on the door, knowing that he and Katie are there, but no one answers. Realising the danger Katie is in, it soon turns into hostage situation and the area is cordoned off. Prior waits by the cordon when Andy and Gennie arrive and she reassures them that the situation is under control, and asks for Katie's mobile number. Prior calls Katie's mobile and Henshall answers. She tells him that she knows he was responsible for the prank calls and asks for his side of the story but he refuses to say anything or let her speak to Katie. On Prior's request to see that Katie is alive, he drags her to the window for her to see.

As night falls, Prior continues to call Henshall's phone but he doesn't answer. Prior's boss tells her that as she cannot handle Henshall, he will send a team in. Foster suggests they storm the place but she overrules him, reminding him that Henshall has already killed two people so they should not risk Katie's life. She tries again to speak to Henshall, putting Foster's mobile through the letterbox when he won't answer the door and calling it repeatedly but he doesn't answer that either so Prior gets a loudspeaker and asks Henshall to answer the phone but he ignores her. The Chief Inspector tells Prior that she did her best and they will send a team in. Andy tries breaking through the cordon and has to be dragged away, warning Prior that he will hold her responsible if anything happens to Katie. Gennie asks what will happen next and Prior tells her that she will try to talk to Henshall for as long as possible, reassuring her that the armed response teams are trained for the type of situation they were in. A shot later rings out and Prior is apprehensive, thinking Henshall has killed Katie but she emerges unharmed. Katie tells Prior that Henshall has shot himself and she is overcome with shock.

== Isaac Nuttall ==
Isaac Nuttall
- Emmerdale character
- Portrayed by: Jake Roche (2010); Benedict Shaw (2018–2019)
- Duration: 2010, 2018–2019
- First appearance: 10 August 2010
- Last appearance: 1 January 2019
- Introduced by: Steve Frost (2010); Jane Hudson (2018)

Isaac Nuttall made his first appearance on 10 August 2010, originally played by Jake Roche. The character and Roche's casting was announced on 5 July 2010. Isaac was introduced as a love interest for Hannah Barton (Grace Cassidy). The character was reintroduced on 31 December 2018, with Benedict Shaw in the role.

Hannah Barton befriends Isaac at college. Hannah and Isaac begin a relationship, but Hannah is unsure of whether she wants to have sex with him. She later tells her friend Victoria Sugden (Isabel Hodgins) that she has had sex, but Isaac reveals that it is not true. Victoria encourages Hannah to make the best of her relationship and holds a party at her brother Andy Sugden's (Kelvin Fletcher) house. At the party, Isaac takes Hannah upstairs and they have sex. They are spotted coming downstairs by Diane Sugden (Elizabeth Estensen) when she breaks the party up. Hannah panics when Isaac tells her the following day that the condom he used split. Hannah gets the morning after pill from a chemist and orders Isaac to stay away from her, but they make up and remain friends. Isaac later flirts with Victoria, so Hannah accuses Victoria of trying to steal him. Hannah meets up with Isaac in the café to discuss their relationship, but when Hannah spots her sister Holly Barton (Sophie Powles) leaving the pub, she goes after her leaving Isaac alone at the table. Isaac breaks up with Hannah via text message, as he does not want to be second best to her family.

Eight years later, Isaac and some friends attend a New Year's Eve party in Emmerdale. He meets Victoria and make it clear he is attracted to her, which angers her boyfriend Ellis Chapman (Asan N'Jie). When Matty Barton (Ash Palmisciano) comes over to see if everything is okay, Isaac recognises him as Hannah. Isaac's friends mock him for having dated a man. As Matty leaves the party, Isaac and his friends surround him and pull his top off. They run away after being interrupted by Victoria and Ellis.

== Alicia Gallagher ==
Alicia Gallagher, played by Natalie Anderson, made her first on-screen appearance on 11 August 2010. Alicia is Leyla Harding's (Roxy Shahidi) sister. Anderson joined the cast of Emmerdale in May 2010 and she said "I'm absolutely thrilled to be joining the show. It'll be wonderful to be working back home in Yorkshire again. I'm a Yorkshire girl so a part in Emmerdale is a dream come true!" Of her character, she said, "Alicia is a complex character, she's not all she seems and she's set to make life quite complicated for Leyla." Alicia is also described as "brassy and trashy and full of attitude.". In order to accommodate actress Natalie Anderson's maternity leave in Summer 2012, Alicia was temporarily written out of the show, she returned on 18 December 2012. Alicia permanently departed on 10 September 2015.

== Justin Gallagher ==
Justin Gallagher
- Emmerdale character
- Portrayed by: Andrew Langtree
- Duration: 2010–2012
- First appearance: 11 August 2010
- Last appearance: 22 June 2012
- Introduced by: Steve Frost
In-universe information
- Wife: Alicia Harding (2002–2012); Talia Brice (2012–present)
- Sons: Jacob Gallagher
- Granddaughters: Leyla Sugden (adoptive)

Justin Gallagher, played by Andrew Langtree, made his first appearance on 11 August 2010. Justin is the ex-husband of Alicia Gallagher (Natalie Anderson). Justin returned on 4 June 2012.

Justin attends the funeral of his mother-in-law, Yvonne Harding. Justin is unhappy to see his sister-in-law, Leyla (Roxy Shahidi), at the funeral. When Leyla later visits them, he asks her to leave as he thought it was a bad idea. Justin later visited Leyla and her boyfriend David Metcalfe (Matthew Wolfenden) and asked her to scatter her mother's ashes. Leyla carried on meeting Justin secretly and David believed that they were having an affair. Whilst David was away on a business trip, Justin visited Leyla and told her that his marriage had broken down and that Alicia blamed Leyla. It was later revealed during an argument between Leyla and Alicia that Justin was unhappy with the way that Alicia treated her sister because their son Jacob (Joe-Warren Plant) was actually Leyla's son. Alicia moved in with Leyla and David and on 23 September, Justin visited Jacob and Alicia but she wasn't pleased to see him and they argued. Justin returned on 30 November to visit Jacob as he was leaving for school and gave him an advent calendar. Alicia comes downstairs in her dressing gown, hungover and argues with Justin over Christmas plans. Justin wanted Jacob to spend Christmas with him but Alicia refused. She had earlier told Leyla that Justin had a new girlfriend. He then told Leyla that this was not true and that Alicia was trying to manipulate people to get her own way. Justin also tells Leyla that he doesn't want to be left out of Jacob's life. Justin returns on 17 December when Jacob goes missing. He immediately accuses Alicia of deliberately not telling him about Jacob's nativity play in revenge for him wanting to have Jacob for Christmas. He also blames her for the situation in front of the police. He gives DS Nick Henshall (Michael McKell) a picture of Jacob and reveals that his mother is waiting at his house in case Jacob goes there, as they believe Jacob had wanted to show his father his costume for the play. During another argument, Justin reveals that he is Jacob's biological father and that Leyla had slept with him in their flat when Jacob was conceived, leaving Alicia feeling betrayed by her sister again. Justin helps search for Jacob and when he is found, goes to hospital with him. He later suggests that Jacob come to stay with him after his recovery but Alicia refuses. In January, Justin tells Leyla that he misses Jacob and tells Alicia that he is going to fight for custody. Leyla supports her sister and tells Justin to leave. Leyla convinces Alicia to agree on access to Jacob on condition that he drop his custody battle and he does so.

In June 2012, Justin returns to the village with his new fiancé, Talia Brice (Carolynne Poole), in order to introduce her to Jacob. Alicia is unhappy to see them and instantly dislikes Talia. Jacob also dislikes Talia. She and Justin later marry offscreen and when Alicia is imprisoned for assaulting Val Pollard (Charlie Hardwick), Jacob refuses to go and live with his father and Talia. Alicia marries David so that Jacob can stay with him in her absence.

== Jacob Sugden ==
Jacob Sugden
- Emmerdale character
- Portrayed by: Joe-Warren Plant
- Duration: 2010–present
- First appearance: Episode 5681; 12 August 2010
- Introduced by: Steve Frost
- Crossover appearances: Corriedale (2026)
In-universe information
- Other names: Jacob Gallagher
- Occupation: Shop assistant Medical student
- Father: Justin Gallagher
- Mother: Leyla Harding
- Adoptive father: David Metcalfe (void)
- Adoptive mother: Alicia Gallagher (void)
- Stepfather: Liam Cavanagh
- Stepmother: Tracy Shankley (adoptive)
- Half-brothers: Theo Metcalfe (adoptive)
- Half-sisters: Amba Metcalfe (adoptive)
- Wife: Sarah Sugden (2026–present)
- Adoptive daughters: Leyla Sugden
- Grandfathers: Eric Pollard (adoptive)
- Grandmothers: Yvonne Harding; Lydia Halliwell (adoptive)

Jacob Gallagher (also Sugden), played by Joe-Warren Plant, first appeared on 12 August 2010. Jacob is the biological son of Justin Gallagher (Andrew Langtree) and Leyla Harding (Roxy Shahidi). Leyla had a one-night-stand with Justin, the husband of her sister Alicia (Natalie Anderson), resulting in her pregnancy with Jacob. Alicia adopted Jacob, believing that Leyla gave him to her out of kindness as she had fertility problems. He was later adopted by Alicia's second husband, David Metcalfe (Matthew Wolfenden).

When Alicia and Justin's marriage breaks down, Alicia and Jacob confront Leyla. Whilst the sisters argue, Eric Pollard (Chris Chittell) and Douglas Potts (Duncan Preston) keep Jacob occupied. When Alicia reveals she is homeless, Leyla invites them to stay with her. Alicia later becomes paranoid that Leyla will take Jacob away and tell him the truth about his parentage. Alicia and Jacob leave the next day but return, after failing to find somewhere else to stay. Alicia enrols Jacob in the local school and he befriends T.J. Woods (Connor Lee), Noah Dingle (Jack Downham), Sarah Sugden (Sophia Amber Moore) and Samson Dingle (Sam Hall). On his first day, Jacob is bullied for being new and T.J. sticks up for him. Alicia encourages Jacob to fight back if anyone picks a fight. Leyla's boyfriend, David, becomes concerned that Leyla is too maternal. At T.J.'s seventh birthday party, Jacob accidentally eats cake with nut traces, which he is allergic to. He goes into anaphylactic shock and Leyla is forced to inject him with his medication. Alicia and Terry Woods (Billy Hartman) take Jacob to hospital. Alicia is furious and accuses Leyla of being neglectful.

At Christmas, Jacob takes part in his school's nativity play. He is disappointed when Justin does not come, saying that he wanted his father to see his costume. Whilst Leyla is babysitting, Jacob sneaks out of the house, intending to go to his father's. The following morning, Alicia discovers he is not in his room and panics. The police are called and Jacob is reported missing. On the moors, Jacob finds shelter in a disused building. As he tries to leave, he is knocked unconscious after falling when part of the floor collapses. Jacob's helmet from his nativity play costume is found and the search focuses on the area where it was found. David finds Jacob and has him winched to safety by a rescue team and taken to hospital where he makes a full recovery. Emotions run high while Jacob is missing and Justin reveals to Alicia that he is Jacob's biological father as he and Leyla had a one-night stand. Leyla admits that Justin is telling the truth and had planned to have an abortion but her mother persuaded her not to, because of Alicia's fertility problems. In November 2013, Alicia tells him that she adopted him and that Leyla is his birth mother. Jacob is shocked and feels betrayed so he runs away. Alicia and David notice that he's gone and call the police. David goes looking for Jacob, assisted by the Sharmas and Rachel Breckle (Gemma Oaten). Priya Sharma (Fiona Wade) also offers to help and finds him hiding at Holdgate farm, assisted by Noah. Priya tells David and Alicia and they rush over. They ask Jacob to come home but he insists on staying with the Sharmas. Jacob eventually forgives Alicia and goes home and eventually moves to Portugal with them. They return, but he leaves again due to David and Alicia's separation in 2015. He returns soon after and is shocked to overhear David telling Leyla that he loves her. Wrongly assuming that the two are a new couple, he confronts them about it the next day. David explains that he and Leyla are not together and reveals his recent testicular cancer diagnosis. Jacob supports David in his diagnosis and celebrates his marriage to Tracy Shankley (Amy Walsh) later that year.

In February 2016, Jacob develops feelings for Gabby Thomas (Rosie Bentham). They attempt to have sex but are caught by her stepmother Laurel Thomas (Charlotte Bellamy), who bruises Jacob's arm. He and Liv Flaherty (Isobel Steele) clash but later become friends. Over time, he begins to develop a crush on Liv. In February 2018, Gabby asks Liv to figure out if Jacob still has feelings for her. Jacob wrongly assumes that Liv is asking him out, but is embarrassed when Liv tells him that she was trying to set him with Gabby. She explains to him that she isn't sure whether she likes boys or girls and he confirms that they will still be friends. Jacob is crushed when Leyla leaves for Greece in early 2018. He is further dismayed to learn of David and Tracey's separation in 2018 and is furious to learn of David's one-night stand with Leyla. David's tumultuous love life becomes a source of irritation for Jacob around this time.

David begins dating Jacob's teacher Maya Stepney (Louisa Clein) following the breakup of her marriage to Liam (Jonny McPherson). Jacob starts to spend time with Liam's daughter Leanna Cavanagh (Mimi Slinger), but is turned off by her trouble-making attitude and takes Maya's side in her feud with Leanna. When Leyla returns from her time in Greece, Jacob is less than thrilled at her return. He quickly accepts Maya as a part of his life and she begins a pattern of grooming behaviour with him, establishing a deep emotional connection. Jacob develops a crush on Maya and kisses her on her birthday. She tells him to forget it the kiss but leaves the door open for future interactions. Jacob starts spending more time with Liv and tells David and Maya that they are sleeping together in an attempt to make Maya jealous. Liv finds out and calls him out in front of David and Maya. Jacob and Maya talk and kiss again and she tries to put boundaries between them, swearing him to secrecy. Jacob starts getting distracted at school and football practice. He tells Ellis Chapman (Asan N'Jie) that he has a crush on someone older, who Ellis assumes to be a girl in sixth form. Ellis tells David and Maya about Jacob's crush and, fearing for her job, Maya angrily rejects Jacob, calling him a "stupid, needy little boy". Jacob makes a pass at Liv at a party and sleeps with Gabby later that night but rejects her after, causing Gabby's mother Bernice Blackstock (Samantha Giles) to storm over to David's shop and shout at him. Maya and Jacob begin an affair, but the stress of keeping the relationship secret begins to wear on Jacob. He ends things after he discovers her controlling, manipulative streak. Despairing at losing his affections, Maya tries to leave the village, but falls and hits her head trying to reach items from the top of her dresser. She ends up in the hospital and the incident pushes Jacob to restart their affair. Maya advises Jacob to be seen dating someone as cover for their activities. He starts dating Liv, who is not interested in having sex, but Maya gets jealous. Jacob arranges for him and Maya to have sex in the cricket pavilion on his sixteenth birthday, but Liv finds the spot first and he is forced to pretend that he arranged it for the two of them. Maya sees the two of them through the window and leaves. Liv takes off as well and Jacob gets drunk and nearly reveals the affair at his birthday party in the café but throws up before he can tell the truth. Jacob and Maya patch things up and a few days later, they go to a hotel where they have sex for the first time. Jacob confesses his love to Maya and dreams of leaving the village with her but worries about how to tell David.

Liv has Jacob over to have sex but he tells her he is no longer interested in the relationship and leaves. She wants to find out why and goes to his house catching he and Maya together. He temporarily convinces her not to say anything. Liv tells Aaron and Robert about Jacob's cheating without disclosing with whom. Jacob is defended by David when they tell him but David privately is ashamed of him. Jacob lies that Liv's drinking contributed to the breakup. Liv blackmails Maya for money in exchange for her silence. Maya is forced to sell her car to get the money and Jacob tries to steal Val Pollard's (Charlie Hardwick) ring to pawn it for cash. He is caught by Eric who brings him to David's house demanding an explanation. Maya lies and says that Jacob was being bullied at school by some older boys. David sends Jacob to Alicia in Portugal to get away from the village. Jacob does not get on the plane and goes to Hotten instead where he meets with Maya. They kiss and are seen by Tracy who is out with Priya and Leyla. The three women drive off with Maya to confront her over the affair with Jacob. After a fight in the woods, she escapes with a head injury and calls Jacob for help. They hide out in a hotel for a few days while she recuperates. Jacob sneaks back to the village to get Maya's passport and some money so they can run away together. He is caught by Tracy, Leyla, and Priya, who take him to David where they reveal everything that has happened. Jacob runs away and leaves by bus before Leyla catches up with him. David keeps trying to call Jacob to talk but Maya refuses contact. David sulks on the floor sobbing at the news that Maya is a sex offender.

Plant was nominated twice for the British Soap Award for Best Young Actor (Jacob) in 2014 and 2019. In 2020, it was announced that Plant would be taking a six-month break from appearing as Jacob due to competing in Dancing on Ice.

On 5 December 2024, it was announced that there would be a special "high-pressure" episode for Jacob in 2025 which would follow his character as he starts his placement working in A&E. Emmerdale producer Sophie Roper revealed that Jacob would possibly cross paths with other villagers in the hospital. She explained: "When Jacob first embarked on his aspirations of having a medical degree we knew at some point we wanted to show a day in his life," Roper said. In this episode, we step away from our usual environs of the village and head to the hospital. This episode takes place entirely on our purpose-built hospital set." She added: "Accident and Emergency is a place many of our characters end up in, but seldom by choice. As the episode unfolds, Jacob will encounter some challenging situations that also affect some of our Emmerdale villagers, pushing Jacob to his limits both professionally and personally." Plant was "hesitant but honoured when he first heard about the storyline and was determined to next year portray it as accurately as he could." He explained: "When I met with our producer Sophie, she told me about this hourlong episode dedicated to Jacob's first day of placement in A&E. I was hit with all these emotions." He continued: "Knowing how many people have this high-pressure job for real gave me the pressure to really knuckle down and get it right. Tackling this storyline scared me at first, but I feel honoured to know they trusted me enough to tell it. That means such a lot and I feel very honoured."

== Hazel Rhodes ==
Hazel Rhodes
- Emmerdale character
- Portrayed by: Pauline Quirke
- Duration: 2010–2012
- First appearance: 12 August 2010
- Last appearance: 25 January 2012
- Introduced by: Steve Frost
In-universe information
- Occupation: Art Teacher; Cafe and shop assistant
- Sisters: Polly
- Husband: Jerry Walsh; Joe Rhodes
- Sons: Jackson Walsh

Hazel Rhodes (also Walsh) is the mother of Jackson Walsh (Marc Silcock). Hazel made her first appearance on 12 August 2010 and on 16 May 2011 it was announced that Quirke had decided to quit Emmerdale. Hazel last appeared on 25 January 2012; Quirke has said she would like to return. Quirke was nominated for the 2011 British Soap Award for "Best Actress" (Hazel). Deborah Ross of The Independent commented on the character saying she "pops up but, sadly, isn't given much to do, bar sit under a pub umbrella and look sad".

Hazel first appears when she came to meet Jackson and quickly clashed with Aaron Livesy (Danny Miller). After Hazel floods Jackson's flat, he is evicted and Paddy Kirk (Dominic Brunt) suggests that they move in with him, but Aaron isn't happy about being under the same roof as Hazel. Jackson sees this and suggests moving Hazel into the B&B but Aaron surprises him by saying that Hazel can stay with them and Paddy.

Hazel settles into the village, starting art classes for the locals and she meets Viv Hope (Deena Payne). The pair start to get to know each other and throw friendly insults at each other, becoming friends. Hazel gets a job at the cafe and becomes friends with Viv's husband Bob (Tony Audenshaw). Bob and Hazel go on a date but when he takes her to his home, Hazel tells him that she only wants to be friends. Bob says he had hoped for a relationship but he agrees to be just friends.

In October 2010, Jackson is critically injured in a road accident when he crashes on a railway line after arguing with Aaron. The van is hit by a train and Jackson is left with life-threatening injuries. Hazel and Bob arrive at the hospital together and she questions Aaron about the accident. Hazel calls Jackson's dad, Jerry, to tell him about what happened. The doctor treating Jackson tells them that Jackson is on life support. Aaron breaks down in tears, blaming himself and Hazel comforts him and tells him that no one is to blame and that Jackson will pull through. When she is allowed to see him, Hazel talks to Jackson while he lies in a coma. Aaron refuses to go in and talk to him because he thinks Jackson wouldn't want him there but Hazel tries to reassure him. Jackson's father, Jerry (Michael J. Jackson), arrives in the hospital and blames Aaron for the accident, and when Jerry goes in to see Jackson with Hazel, he says that he thinks that it was Hazel's meddling that caused the accident too. Hazel tells Jerry he has no right to blame anyone. She reveals to Aaron that Jerry hit Jackson when he revealed that he was gay. A few days later Jackson wakes from his coma and Jackson's consultant tells Hazel, Jerry and Aaron that Jackson has two broken bones in his neck and may never walk again. Hazel remains positive and hopes Jackson will walk again. Later that day the consultant breaks the news to Jackson with Hazel and Aaron at his bedside.

Hazel rows with Jerry over who would take care of Jackson when he leaves hospital and Jerry tells her that he wants Jackson to stay with him. However, Hazel's landlord Declan Macey (Jason Merrells) offers her his old house Dale Head for both her and Jackson. Hazel gets builders to convert the ground floor into living quarters suitable for Jackson. Hazel becomes Jackson's full-time carer, but after Jackson persuades her she hires a full-time carer, Joe Chappell (Scott Taylor). Hazel confronts Aaron and tells him to listen to what Jackson has to say. Hazel is unhappy when Jackson ends his relationship with Aaron and lets him go and enjoy life. Hazel clashes with Aaron's mother Chas Dingle (Lucy Pargeter) about his behaviour telling her to tell Aaron to not hurt Jackson anymore.

Hazel agrees to help Jackson die, but she is unable to go through with it. Aaron gives Jackson's a cocktail of drugs and he dies, devastating Hazel. She is arrested, but released. Ashley tells Hazel that he cannot condone what she has done and refuses to carry out Jackson's funeral. Another vicar conducts the service instead.

== Jerry Walsh ==
Jerry Walsh
- Emmerdale character
- Portrayed by: Michael J. Jackson
- Duration: 2010-2011
- First appearance: 8 October 2010
- Last appearance: 28 July 2011
- Introduced by: Steve Frost
In-universe information
- Wife: Hazel Rhodes; Eileen Walsh
- Sons: Jackson Walsh; Josh Walsh

Jerry Walsh is the father of Jackson Walsh (Marc Silcock), played by actor Michael J. Jackson. Jerry first appeared on 8 October 2010 at the hospital after Jackson is badly injured in a car crash on a railway line. Jerry takes an instant dislike to Jackson's boyfriend Aaron Livesy (Danny Miller) and orders him to leave after discovering that Aaron had accidentally caused the crash by ringing Jackson and the crash was caused by Jackson trying to pick the up and answer his mobile phone. It is revealed that Jerry was strongly homophobic and had punched Jackson when he had revealed that he was gay. When Jackson is discovered to have suffered severe neck and spinal injuries which could potentially paralyse him, Jerry decides to leave the hospital after telling his ex-wife and Jackson's mother, Hazel Rhodes (Pauline Quirke), to not tell Jackson about the paralysis but she later does so. Jerry later visits Aaron in the village and Aaron convinces him to go and visit Jackson again. Jerry does so after Jackson regains consciousness and Jackson resolves things with his father and thanks him for coming to see him. Jerry returns on the day that Jackson has an operation on his back. Jerry offers Jackson encouragement. He is later devastated to learn from Hazel that Jackson will never walk again after she demands answers from the surgeon. Jerry asks Aaron not to tell Jackson so Aaron tells Jerry to tell him but he cannot bring himself to do it so Aaron does it for him. Jerry later suggests that Jackson come and live with him but Jackson rejects his offer as he was still angry at his father's previous homophobia towards him. Jerry tells Jackson that his offer is still there if he changed his mind but he agrees to give money to Hazel each month to help pay for Jackson's care. Jerry later asks Jackson to be godfather to his son Josh, Jackson's half-brother, at his christening but Jackson refuses. Jerry also attends a football match with Jackson, Aaron, Hazel, Chas Dingle (Lucy Pargeter), Rhona Goskirk (Zoë Henry) and Paddy Kirk (Dominic Brunt). In June 2011, Jackson invites Jerry to the village pub, The Woolpack, for a drink along with his other family and friends. Jackson tells Jerry that he loves him, wanting to say farewell to his father. The following day Aaron and Hazel help Jackson commit suicide by feeding him a cocktail of drugs. Jerry arrives in the village when he hears the news of Jackson's death and breaks down in tears. Jerry becomes outraged with both Aaron and Hazel after he discovers that they helped Jackson die. After laying flowers at the scene, he angrily attacks Aaron and calls him a "pervert", accusing him of murdering Jackson. Aaron's uncle Cain Dingle (Jeff Hordley) threatens Jerry and tells him to leave and he does so, telling Aaron that he will get his comeuppance. Jerry attends Jackson's funeral in the village church and is pleased when he hears that Aaron has been charged with Jackson's murder and cannot attend the funeral as he was in court. Two weeks later, Jerry arrives in the village drunk and confronts Aaron in the café and tells him that he has made a damning statement to the police in which he has implicated Aaron as a murderer in order to make sure he is imprisoned. He then attacks Aaron and Carl King (Tom Lister) and Bob Hope (Tony Audenshaw) eject him from the café and tell him to go home. During Aaron's trial, Jerry takes the stand to give evidence as a prosecution witness and tells the court what he believes but is threatened with contempt of court when he loses his temper and begins shouting at Aaron. After Aaron is found not guilty, Jerry confronts him and tells him that he still believes that he is guilty of murdering Jackson, even if the jury did not believe it. He then tells Aaron that he hoped that Jackson's death would haunt him for the rest of his life and walks away.

== Derek Benrose ==
Derek Benrose
- Emmerdale character
- Portrayed by: Stephen Bent
- Duration: 2010–2011
- First appearance: 1 November 2010
- Last appearance: 4 May 2011
- Introduced by: Steve Frost
In-universe information
- Occupation: Factory delivery driver

Derek Benrose is introduced as the delivery driver for Sharma and Sharma confectioners. Derek appears to be quite lazy and is forever being told off by his boss Jai Sharma (Chris Bisson) who always threatens to fire him if he does not work hard enough. During his time he becomes friends with many of the villagers. Towards the end of 2010 he forms a close relationship with Lisa Dingle (Jane Cox), it becomes apparent that he has feelings for her. Lisa's husband Zak (Steve Halliwell), is oblivious to this but forms a good friendship with Derek as he finds jobs for Zak for his delivery van business. On 6 January, Derek and Lisa are both working overtime in the factory together, while everyone else is out at the pub. During this time Derek attacks and rapes Lisa and calls her "a cheap little hussey" when she rejects him. He locks Lisa in the factory and tells her to keep it as their little secret, just after Jai and Charity Dingle (Emma Atkins), attempt to enter the factory and believe Derek and Lisa have gone home as the factory is locked. After Lisa demands to be allowed to go home, Derek lets her out just as Zak and their daughter Belle (Eden Taylor-Draper) arrive but Lisa does not tell Zak about the rape. Zak offers Derek a drink at the pub but Lisa wishes to go home. Afterwards Derek goes to the pub and Jai confronts him and asks him why the factory was locked and Derek tells him that Lisa was a bit jumpy from being on her own so they locked the factory to feel secure. The following day, Lisa orders Derek to stay away from her and her family. Derek acts as if nothing has happened and Lisa is openly hostile towards him, noticed by her colleagues and friends. Derek attends a school play in which his nephew is a member of the cast. Lisa's step-grandson, Samson (Sam Hall) is also in the production and Lisa is forced to sit near Derek during the performance. Afterwards, Lisa repeats her demands that Derek stay away from her. In February, Lisa is concerned when Derek starts flirting with her colleague Lizzie Lakely (Kitty McGeever) and asks her out on a date. Lisa then discovers that both Derek and Lizzie have signed up for overtime and she fears that he could strike again. Lisa tells Derek to stay away from Lizzie but he defiantly tells her that she cannot tell him who he can and cannot speak to. Lisa tries to convince Lizzie to stay clear of Derek but she is unsuccessful and Lizzie accuses her of being jealous. The following day, Lisa begs Lizzie to give up her overtime and the women argue and Derek gets involved. Lisa then reveals to Lizzie that Derek raped her. Derek attempts to deny Lisa's accusation and claims that she made a pass at him and that he turned her down, not wanting to betray Zak, but the other factory workers are not convinced and believe Lisa. Jai and his brother Nikhil (Rik Makarem) then suspend Derek from work and tell him to go home and he threatens to sue them. The following day Derek returns to the factory to the astonishment of the other workers and asks Jai and Nikhil if he can talk to them in their office but they refuse and tell Derek to go home. In frustration, Derek resigns from his job and leaves. On 14 March, the police reveal that there is not enough evidence to prosecute Derek for the rape. A furious Zak tracks Derek down to his home. He forces his way into the house and attacks Derek. Lisa follows Zak and manages to stop him from killing Derek. Zak then demands that Derek admits to raping Lisa but he refuses. Derek lies to Zak, claiming that Lisa was obsessed with him, which angers Lisa and she also demands that Derek admits to raping her. She then describes the details of the attack in front of Zak. Zak then tells Derek that he has not got away with his crime and that he will get his comeuppance one day. Zak and Lisa then leave and Derek is clearly shaken by their words. The following week, Lisa receives a letter from the Crown Prosecution Service telling her that Derek has raped another woman and has been arrested and charged and that her rape case was under review. Lisa tells Zak that the CPS want to charge Derek with her rape and intend to hold a joint trial for both offences. Lisa then explains to Zak that she wants to give evidence in order to make sure Derek is imprisoned. In May 2011, Derek stands trial and Lisa faces him in court. She gives evidence but is cross-examined and Derek denies raping her whilst giving evidence in his defence, still insisting that they had consensual sex. Derek is found guilty of the second rape, that of a woman called Claire Aston, but is acquitted of raping Lisa and he was sent to prison.

== Mia Macey ==
Mia Macey
- Emmerdale character
- Portrayed by: Sapphire Elia
- Duration: 2010–2011
- First appearance: 29 November 2010
- Last appearance: 31 August 2011
- Introduced by: Steve Frost
In-universe information
- Father: Jai Sharma
- Mother: Ella Hart
- Adoptive father: Declan Macey
- Half-brothers: Archie Breckle
- Half-sisters: Eliza Sharma
- Grandfathers: Rishi Sharma (adoptive); Dermot Macey (adoptive)
- Grandmothers: Georgia Sharma
- Uncles: Nikhil Sharma
- Aunts: Priya Sharma; Megan Macey (adoptive)
- First cousins: Robbie Lawson (adoptive); Eliza Sharma (adoptive); Amba Metcalfe

Mia Macey, played by Sapphire Elia, made her first on screen appearance on 29 November 2010. Mia is the daughter of Ella Hart (Corrinne Wicks) and established character Jai Sharma (Chris Bisson). Mia does not know Jai is her father and believes Declan Macey (Jason Merrells) is her father instead.

In early 2011, Elia confirmed she would be departing Emmerdale at the end of her contract. On 25 October 2011, it was announced Mia would be killed off-screen. Declan learns of Mia's death in November and the news comes shortly after he agrees to let her pay a visit to Home Farm. Mia dies following a car accident.

Mia follows her mother Ella to Emmerdale. Declan is unaware she is coming and Mia walks in on him kissing Alicia Gallagher (Natalie Anderson). Mia sings a duet with Adam Barton (Adam Thomas) at the pub, making his girlfriend, Scarlett Nicholls (Kelsey-Beth Crossley), jealous. Scarlett is further angered when she catches Mia kissing Adam. Scarlett slaps Mia and the two girls fight. Mia steps in as her father's PA after Nicola King (Nicola Wheeler) takes time off. Declan's gamekeeper, Sam Dingle (James Hooton), reports a wall has been knocked down and Mia suggests Adam should help fix it, angering Adam's father John (James Thornton). Later, Adam embarks on an affair with Mia's mother, Ella. Mia is livid when the affair is exposed and knees Adam in the crotch in fury.

Ella reveals to Declan that Jai Sharma (Chris Bisson) is actually Mia's biological father. Declan struggles to be around Mia following the announcement. He decides to send her away with his father and Mia departs the village with Dermot and goes to Ireland with him. Three months later, Declan allows Mia to visit Home Farm. Shortly before her arrival, Declan is informed by the police Mia has been killed in a car accident. Her funeral takes place off screen and she was cremated. Her ashes are later scattered by Declan.

== Dermot Macey ==
Dermot Macey
- Emmerdale character
- Portrayed by: Frank Kelly
- Duration: 2010–2011
- First appearance: 21 December 2010
- Last appearance: 31 August 2011
- Introduced by: Steve Frost
In-universe information
- Occupation: Businessman
- Sons: Declan Macey
- Daughters: Megan Macey
- Grandsons: Robbie Lawson
- Granddaughters: Eliza Sharma

Dermot Macey, played by Frank Kelly, made his first appearance on 21 December 2010. He departed on 31 August 2011. On 28 April 2011, it was announced that Frank Kelly had quit Emmerdale, to work closer to his home in Dublin and that Dermot would leave in the summer.

Dermot Macey arrives in Emmerdale to spend Christmas with his family and to make amends with his son Declan Macey (Jason Merrells), but when Declan sees him in the bus shelter, he insists it would be better if he leaves and gives him money to make him leave, but when Declan returns to Home Farm, Dermot was sitting with Declan's wife Ella and daughter Mia Macey.

He soon takes a liking to Pearl Ladderbanks (Meg Johnson), who lets him buy a drink for her. However, her friend Alan Turner (Richard Thorp) dislikes Dermot, as he thinks that Dermot is not the right sort of person Pearl should be going for. The evening initially goes well, and they seem to take a liking to each other, until Dermot insults her about her weight, which upsets her. An angry Pearl decides to ignore him for the rest of that night. In August, Declan is devastated to discover that Mia is actually Jai Sharma's daughter. Declan tells Jai to stay away from her, but when this doesn't happen, Declan asks Dermot to take Mia back to Dublin.

== Other characters ==
Date(s)	Character	Actor	Circumstances
8–18 March	Sue Hastings	Jan Francis	A woman who meets Rodney Blackstock (Patrick Mower) at a posh restaurant, where he plucks up the courage to introduce himself to her. They are getting along fine when Charlie Haynes (George Costigan) tells Sue that Rodney is a lawyer. Rodney does not deny it and bluffs his way through conversation. Days later, Sue asks to go to the Grange Restaurant in the village despite Rodney reluctance, as the restaurant is owned by his friends Eric Pollard (Chris Chittell) and Val Pollard (Charlie Hardwick). Sue asks Rodney some questions about his job, which catches him out, as Sue knows about the law. She is angry about the lies and tells Rodney that she would have been happy with someone who was a deliveryman and subsequently storms out.
25 May–8 June	Tania Page	Victoria Pritchard	A council employee who becomes attracted to David Metcalfe (Matthew Wolfenden). She attempts to seduce David in her flat but he turns her down and tells her to stay away from him. David later discovers that Tania had secretly recorded their meetings and that Nathan Wylde (Lyndon Ogbourne) had been behind it. Nathan had paid Tania to seduce David and make it look like they were having an affair in order to blackmail him.
26 May–17 June	Wayne Dobson	Gary Hanks	A local criminal and bully, Wayne is first seen doing community service alongside Aaron Livesy (Danny Miller), who is carrying out a community payback scheme for assaulting Jackson Walsh (Marc Silcock). Wayne bullies Aaron for being gay and then pushes him into a nearby lake and tries to provoke Aaron into a fight by threatening him with a spanner at the garage where he works, but Aaron does not take the bait.
11 August–14 October	Abi Peterson	Catherine Tyldesley	A prison guard who befriends Ryan Lamb (James Sutton) when he is remanded in custody to await trial for the murder of his father Mark Wylde (Maxwell Caulfield). She is instantly attracted to Ryan and acts as a confidant for him. They nearly kiss and are almost discovered by Ryan's cellmate Curtis Bevan (Kyle Rees). Abi later lends Ryan a mobile phone so he can call his mother Faye (Kim Thomson). Curtis later discovers the phone and beats Ryan up when he tries to get it back. Abi also breaks up a fight between Ryan and his half-brother Nathan Wylde (Lyndon Ogbourne), who had framed him for the murder, in the visiting room when Nathan visited Ryan so he could taunt him. Abi later goes to the village to speak to Faye and tells her about her relationship with Ryan, when Nathan spots her as she is leaving and recognizes her from the prison. He concludes that she and Ryan are in a relationship and threatens to tell the prison authorities. Abi later visits Faye at her work and tells her that she has been transferred to another prison and Faye concludes that Nathan reported her.
14–30 September	Curtis Bevan	Kyle Rees	Ryan Lamb's (James Sutton) cellmate. He realises that Ryan has been seeing prison guard Abi Peterson (Catherine Tyldesley). He also discovers a mobile phone that Abi had given him to contact his mother with but after Ryan continues to deny him usage of it, Curtis attacks him. Curtis is then transferred to another cell in a different wing of the prison.
17 September–6 October	Mickey Hall	Lee Oakes	A man who is given a lift in one of Terry Woods' (Billy Hartman) cars in which he leaves a dog collar. He returns to collect it and Aaron Livesy (Danny Miller) sells him a clocked car. Mickey discovers this and confronts Aaron but Aaron refuses to refund him so he leaves. When no one is around, Mickey vandalises the garage and taxi office. After repeated attempts by Mickey to get his money back, Aaron goes with his dog Clyde to Mickey's house and threatens him. Later, Mickey comes back to the village and sets his dog on Clyde. Clyde has to be put down and this leaves Aaron devastated and wanting revenge. It is revealed later that Aaron's boyfriend Jackson Walsh (Marc Silcock) has paid Mickey the money for the car in order to settle the feud between them. Mickey is last seen on a night out in Hotten when Aaron spots him in the street and starts stalking him, intending to assault him but Jackson stops him.
17 September–17 November	Dan Cravely	James Boyland	Holly Barton's (Sophie Powles) boyfriend. Dan and Holly first meet after she runs away from home. He first appears after Holly's parents, John (James Thornton) and Moira Barton (Natalie J. Robb) had just left their flat after finding where she was living. He gave her some cocaine but was on edge and worrying that they might discover that he is a drug dealer. He later appears to tell Holly that Moira and Adam had been near the flat and orders her to keep them away by reassuring them that she is fine by treating them to a meal. John later visits again on his own and Dan catches him searching the flat and John accuses him of dealing. Dan and Holly tell John to leave but Dan later throws Holly out after deciding that letting her stay was too risky. Moira visits Dan to buy drugs for Holly after she decides to try and wean her off the heroin slowly.
11 November 2010 – 2011	Nurse Summers	Vanessa Hehir	A nurse who takes care of Jackson Walsh (Marc Silcock) whilst he is in hospital recovering from his injuries sustained in a road accident, and has to feed and shave him because he is paralysed from the neck down. Summers often has to placate Jackson's family and friends when emotions are high and banter is often exchanged between her and Jackson.
