= Adam Barton (Emmerdale) =

Fictional character from Emmerdale

- Emmerdale character
- Portrayed by: Adam Thomas
- Duration: 2009–2018
- First appearance: Episode 5350; 17 July 2009
- Last appearance: Episode 8031; 2 January 2018
- Introduced by: Steve November
In-universe information
- Occupation: Farmhand; Businessman
- Father: James Barton
- Mother: Moira Dingle
- Adoptive father: John Barton
- Stepfather: Cain Dingle
- Stepmother: Emma Barton
- Half-brothers: Ross Barton; Pete Barton; Finn Barton; Matty Barton; Isaac Dingle
- Half-sisters: Holly Barton
- Wife: Victoria Sugden (2015–2020)
- Uncles: John Barton
- Nephews: Moses Dingle
- First cousins: Matty Barton; Holly Barton

Adam Barton is a fictional character from the British ITV soap opera Emmerdale, portrayed by Adam Thomas. The character first appeared during the episode broadcast on 17 July 2009, after the character and Thomas's role were announced alongside that other Barton family characters in May 2009. Thomas called Adam "a family man." Thomas decided to leave the show after seven years following a break from acting in 2016 to participate in I'm a Celebrity...Get Me Out of Here!. Adam's departure was announced on 22 June 2017, with the episode airing on 2 January 2018.

Storylines featuring Adam have included: a bromance with Aaron Dingle (Danny Miller), suffering a breakdown and committing arson following the death of his father, John Barton (James Thornton); discovering his uncle, James Barton (Bill Ward), is actually his biological father; his on-off marriage to Victoria Sugden (Isabel Hodgins); believing he fathered Johnny Woodfield after a one-night stand with Vanessa Woodfield (Michelle Hardwick); his fertility issues which prevent him having a child with Victoria; and admitting to killing his stepmother Emma Barton (Gillian Kearney) to protect his mother Moira (Natalie J. Robb), who had actually killed her.

== Casting ==
In May 2009, it was announced that Emmerdale's new series producer, Gavin Blyth, would introduce The Barton's, a new farming family, as part of an ongoing overhaul of the show. The family, which comprises five members – mother, father, two daughters and a son – took over the running of Butler's Farm. Of the family, Blyth said "I don't want to make Emmerdale a show about teenagers and young people, it's about family values. The Barton's are sexy, modern and contemporary. They're almost happy – and in soap land that's quite strange!" Natalie J. Robb and James Thornton were cast in the roles of parents, John and Moira. Sophie Powles and Grace Cassidy were cast their daughters, Holly and Hannah respectively.

Jake Roche auditioned for the role of Adam, however, it was actor Adam Thomas who was eventually cast. Speaking of his casting, Thomas said that "Adam's a family man... Whatever his dad says, he does. The whole family is really close. Even with his sisters, he's the middle child but he wants to be the older brother and look after them all."

== Development ==
=== Departure ===
In March 2017, it was reported that Thomas had decided to leave Emmerdale after appearing in reality TV competition, I'm a Celebrity...Get Me Out of Here!, although the actor denied the reports. However, on 22 June 2017, it was reported that Thomas had chosen to leave the show after eight years in the role. Adam's final scenes were broadcast on 2 January 2018, during an hour-long episode. Thomas called the decision to leave "tough", but cited his reasons for leaving as wanting to try new roles. He added that he had enjoyed working at Emmerdale and thanked the team for providing him with the role of Adam and for creating "some great storylines" for the character. The show's producer, Iain MacLeod, revealed that Thomas had alerted the show's bosses well in advance so that they would be able to create an "enormous" release story for him. He also commented, "Everyone will be really gutted to see Adam go! [...] It will be sad to say goodbye to such a brilliant character from the cast."

== Storylines ==
Towards the end of 2009, Holly Barton (Sophie Powles) starts flirting with Aaron Livesy (Danny Miller) and it looks like a relationship is brewing. At first, Adam isn't keen but comes around, making friends with Aaron. When Aaron suddenly starts playing hard to get with Holly, Adam questions it, but Aaron says it's all part of the plan. However, everything slots into place when the boys and Holly go on a "lads" night out. When Aaron and Adam are on their way back, they are involved in a car crash and Aaron cuts his head. As Adam is checking it out, Aaron leans in for a kiss. Adam is horrified and pulls away, questioning Aaron's sexuality, but Aaron convinces him that it's all in his head. Not completely convinced, he tells Holly after realising that she has slept with Aaron, but his parents insist he drops it when Holly, refusing to believe Adam, gets annoyed with him. Aaron watches jealously as Adam gets closer to Scarlett Nicholls (Kelsey-Beth Crossley) and starts dating her.

In early 2010, Adam is still convinced that Aaron is gay, but leaves Aaron alone as he learns that Hannah is being bullied, but is confused about why Victoria Sugden (Isabel Hodgins) did it. When sheep on the Barton's farm start being stillborn, John knows something is wrong but doesn't know what. When Carl King's (Tom Lister) children, Thomas (Jack Ferguson) and Anya (Ceryen Dean), are hospitalised, Jai (Chris Bisson) and Nikhil Sharma (Rik Makarem) are blamed but tests clear them and Adam remembers moving some toxic barrels a few months back and is shocked to discover he's responsible. When he confesses to his parents, John goes mad but realises that they have to admit responsibility. They are fined by Nathan Wylde (Lyndon Ogbourne) for the cleaning up, so John stops Adam's wages until the bill is paid.

In April, Adam witnesses Aaron kissing his secret boyfriend, Jackson Walsh (Marc Silcock), but tells Aaron that he'll still be his mate, regardless of his sexuality, and keep his relationship secret. On his birthday, Adam and others at The Woolpack see Aaron punch Jackson, after Aaron thinks he's flirting with him in public, resulting in Aaron being arrested. When released, Aaron decides he can no longer risk people finding out he's gay and attempts suicide in the garage. When Adam and Cain Dingle (Jeff Hordley) discover him, they save him but Aaron reveals that he wishes he had died.

Adam and his whole family struggle to come to terms with his sister Holly's addiction to heroin. He takes her to see Jackson who, after a horrific accident, has lost his ability to walk. Adam tries to show Holly that, she (unlike Jackson) can choose to get better, and she has made herself ill. The message doesn't sink in and Aaron is annoyed with Adam for using Jackson to get this message across to his sister.

Scarlett notices that Adam has less and less time for her, ignoring her phone calls and text messages. This decline in their relationship culminates in Adam kissing Mia Macey (Sapphire Elia) on New Year's Eve. Devastated by this, Scarlett leaves for a holiday in Canada. Adam tries to pursue Mia, although she plays hard to get. They later start a relationship although Adam ruins this when he starts an affair with Mia's mother, Ella (Corrinne Wicks). She is furious when she finds out the truth and leaves the village. Adam is understandably distraught when he learns of his mother's affair with Cain, but he is delighted when John and Moira patch things up and they get back together. When John and Moira spend the night in a hotel, Adam is stunned to receive a phone call from Katie Sugden (Sammy Winward), informing him that John and Moira have been in a car accident. Shortly after arriving at the hospital, Adam watches in horror as the doctors declare his father dead.

Adam falls to pieces after the death of John, blaming Cain for his death, believing that if Cain had not seduced Moira, his parents would have never split and had to go on the romantic break, resulting in John's death. Adam then set fire to the Dingle Automotors Garage, trapping Cain inside, then saving him. Adam confides in Aaron. Seeing Adam's pain at the grieving of John, Aaron tells the police he started the fire. Missing court, Adam helps Aaron escape to France with Ed Roberts (Lloyd Everitt).

In August 2014, Adam is shocked as Aaron returns two years later and is ready to cover for Adam, following events of the fire at the garage. Aaron confesses to arson for Adam, but Adam later clears his name and spends a while in prison. During his time there, Adam suffers a beating, but recovers in hospital and is later released from prison. Adam and Aaron set up a small scrapyard business nearby. Emma Barton sabotages them early on and things nearly end in tears when Aaron is hardly attending work, but the two friends continue to make it work. In March 2015, Adam proposes to Victoria Sugden on her 21st birthday. Victoria accepts, but later admits that she is not ready for marriage and lets Adam down, leading to the pair breaking up. Adam sleeps with Vanessa Woodfield, who later becomes pregnant, but the father is unknown. Eventually, results reveal that Adam is the father, when really the actual father of Vanessa's baby is Kirin Kotecha. Adam and Victoria elope to get married, following Victoria's accidental knock down of Ashley Thomas, who is hospitalised and diagnosed with epilepsy. Adam and Victoria marry on the day of Victoria's court hearing, and she is given a caution for accidentally running Ashley over. In late July 2015, Adam and Victoria return from their honeymoon and focus on their life as a married couple, but it is interrupted by the existence of Adam's unborn child, as it is still believed that Adam is the father. Adam fails to arrive at Vanessa's scan, which angers her and she makes the decision to leave Emmerdale because she does not want Adam involved in the upbringing of Vanessa's baby. In August 2015, Adam considers him and Victoria leaving instead to start a new life, but Victoria thinks Adam is mad thinking of leaving. Adam gets grief from Rhona Goskirk and he gets drunk, rather than attend the wedding of Pete Barton and Debbie Dingle. Adam falls asleep in a car at the scrapyard, but is unaware that a fire had been started, which then caused some gas canisters to explode and collide with a helicopter, which then crashed through the roof of the Village Hall. Adam wakes up in the car and Robert and Chrissie get him out before the car explodes.

In January 2016, Vanessa takes another DNA test to see if Adam really is the father of Johnny (Vanessa's baby), after she finds a birthmark which the midwife says that it is perfectly normal for a mixed-race baby to have. The DNA test reveals that Kirin is actually the father. When Vanessa breaks the news to Adam, he is devastated and attacks Kirin's father after he learns that it was him that switched the DNA results. Vanessa gives Adam some time alone with Johnny, but Adam takes off with him and hides in a hotel. Victoria talks Adam into returning Johnny to Vanessa before it gets serious. In February 2016, after learning that Aaron had been repeatedly raped at the hands of his father when he was younger, Adam is livid and offers to help Cain deal with Aaron's dad. After Aaron returns from giving evidence at the police station, he hugs him and apologises for not being there for him.

In March 2016, Adam left shocked to found out that Holly returned to the village after 4 years away. A month later, Adam supports Aaron through the court case where Gordon is found guilty and sent to prison. A few weeks later, Adam celebrates with the rest of the family when Aaron gets his deed poll letter officially declaring him as a Dingle.

In September 2016, Adam is heartbroken by the sudden loss of his sister Holly, who died from a heroin overdose. He and Victoria move back to Butlers to support Moira. On the day of the funeral, Adam is angry and upset that his sister Hannah is unable to attend and comforts Moira as they say their final goodbyes to Holly. The following week, Adam helps Robert pull Aaron out following a motorway collision and Adam went to the ambulance with Aaron who later survive. Later, on the same day, he is devastated when James dies as a result of the same accident. On the day of James' funeral, Adam tries to put a brave face on everything, insisting to Moira that he has already buried his dad. However, when Ashley interrupts the service Adam gets upset and asks Laurel to take her husband out, saying he's ruining his dad's funeral. Adam is surprised to learn that James has left him an equal share in his will much to Ross' displeasure. They clash over the issue and Adam admits he was not going to take it but changes his mind and decides to accept it.

Adam fights with Ross after he learns that he tried it on with Victoria. Victoria tries to break them up but ends up getting hurt. She is taken to the hospital where she tells a shocked Adam she might be pregnant. The test comes back negative, but Vic confides in Finn that she wants a baby and she's not sure how Adam feels. Later at Butlers, Victoria tells Adam she wants a baby and Adam concedes that if that is what she wants then they will start trying. The next day, Adam confides to Aaron his doubts about starting a family after his experience with Johnny. Aaron assures Adam he's already proven he'll be a great dad and offers to babysit for him anytime. Later, Ross apologises to Vic and Adam for his earlier behaviour and they call a truce. Adam tells Moira that he and Victoria are trying to start a family and she is delighted.

In February 2017, Adam helps the Sugdens and the Dingles organise Robert and Aaron's impromptu wedding. The next day, Adam is gutted when Aaron is sent to prison for 12 months on a GBH charge. However, he is released two months later much to Adam's joy. That year, Victoria and Adam try to conceive a baby, but Victoria fails to get pregnant. Diane Sugden (Elizabeth Estensen) pays for a private fertility clinic, where it is revealed that Adam has zero sperm count. The couple is devastated and begin to fall out. Adam kisses Vanessa during a moment of weakness, leading to Victoria breaking up with him.

== Reception ==
For his portrayal of Adam, Thomas won the Best Soap Newcomer at the 2010 TV Choice Awards.
