= Aaron Dingle =

Fictional character from Emmerdale

- Emmerdale character
- Danny Miller as Aaron Dingle
- Portrayed by: Danny Webb (2003–2006); Danny Miller (2008–present); Bryan Parry (2016)
- Duration: 2003–2004, 2006, 2008–2012, 2014–present
- First appearance: Episode 3616; 24 December 2003
- Introduced by: Steve Frost (2003); Kathleen Beedles (2006); Anita Turner (2008); Kate Oates (2014); Jane Hudson (2022)
- Crossover appearances: Corriedale (2026)
- Danny Webb as Aaron Livesy
In-universe information
- Other names: Aaron Livesy; Aaron Sugden-Dingle
- Occupation: Mechanic; Businessowner
- Father: Gordon Livesy
- Mother: Chas Dingle
- Stepfather: Paddy Kirk
- Stepmother: Sandra Flaherty
- Half-sisters: Liv Flaherty; Grace Dingle; Eve Dingle
- Husband: Robert Sugden (2018–2022); John Sugden (2025–2026)
- Stepsons: Sebastian White
- Grandfathers: Shadrach Dingle
- Grandmothers: Faith Dingle
- Uncles: Cain Dingle; Caleb Miligan
- Aunts: Gennie Walker
- First cousins: Debbie Dingle; Nate Robinson; Kyle Dingle; Isaac Dingle; Nicky Miligan
- Other relatives: Zak Dingle; Marlon Dingle; Eli Dingle; Belle Dingle; Mandy Dingle; Sam Dingle; Samson Dingle; Sarah Sugden; Jack Sugden; Charity Dingle; Noah Dingle; Ryan Stocks; Frankie Robinson; Leyla Sugden

Aaron Dingle (also Livesy) is a fictional character from the British soap opera Emmerdale, played by Danny Miller. The character was originally played by Danny Webb and appeared in a recurring capacity. Aaron made his first appearance during the episode broadcast on 24 December 2003. When Aaron was reintroduced in 2008, he was promoted to the full-time cast and the decision was made to recast the role. Miller successfully auditioned for the part and later admitted that he would have quit acting if he had not been cast.

Aaron is the son of Chas Dingle (Lucy Pargeter) and Gordon Livesy (Gerard Fletcher/Gary Mavers). His storylines have included being involved with the criminal McFarlane family, making a romantic advance towards his best friend Adam Barton (Adam Thomas) which resulted in attempted suicide, coming to terms with his homosexuality, his relationship with Jackson Walsh (Marc Silcock), and dealing with Jackson's suicide. Miller chose to leave the show in November 2011 and he made his final appearance on 5 April 2012. Aaron's exit storyline saw him accused of arson and so he left the village with his new partner Ed Roberts (Lloyd Everitt).

Two years later, Miller reprised the role and Aaron returned on 14 August 2014, as part of a heist storyline involving Donna Windsor (Verity Rushworth) and Ross Barton (Michael Parr). The character's most notable storylines since his return have been his affair and subsequent relationship with Robert Sugden (Ryan Hawley), his role in Katie Sugden's (Sammy Winward) death, self-harming, revealing that he was sexually abused by his father Gordon when he was a child which made him attempt suicide once more, reuniting with his estranged half-sister Liv Flaherty (Isobel Steele) and becoming her guardian, being sent to prison for grievous bodily harm, and breaking up and reuniting with Robert, playing a part in raising his son, and marrying him. In November 2021, it was announced that Miller would be competing in the ITV series I'm a Celebrity...Get Me Out of Here! and that he would be leaving Emmerdale once again and Aaron departed on 6 December 2021. However, the following year, Miller returned to the role of Aaron for a guest stint on 3 October 2022 to celebrate Emmerdale's 50th anniversary with Aaron departing once again on 31 October 2022. Miller made an unannounced return on 9 October 2023, revealed to be his uncles Cain and Caleb Miligan (William Ash)'s hostage at Wylies Farm.

== Casting ==
Jake Roche auditioned for the role of Aaron, however, it was actor Danny Webb who was eventually cast. Aaron first appeared in Emmerdale in 2003 as a recurring character. In 2008, Aaron was reintroduced as a full-time cast member and the decision was made to recast the part. Former Grange Hill actor Danny Miller successfully auditioned for the role of Aaron. Miller admitted in an interview with Sue Crawford of The People that he would have quit acting for good if he had not landed the role. On 20 December 2016, Aaron was temporarily played by actor Bryan Parry in a special episode focusing on the viewpoint of dementia patient Ashley Thomas (John Middleton).

== Development ==
=== Characterisation ===
Violent, angry and always in trouble, the character quickly established himself as the 'baddest' of bad boys. Describing Aaron, Lucy Pargeter (Chas Dingle) said "Aaron's an absolute pain in the arse for Chas. Danny Miller, who plays him, is brilliant. He gives so much and he's only young".

=== Sexuality ===
"I'd never thought Aaron could be gay – he's probably the most unlikely person in the village to be gay. I saw it as a challenge and said yes, but I was still quite anxious about it."

— Miller on his reaction to finding out Aaron is gay. (2010)

A high-profile storyline for the character was when he began to question his sexual orientation. As the storyline progressed, Aaron was seen struggling to come to terms with his sexuality, before admitting the truth to his friend and guardian Paddy Kirk (Dominic Brunt). Miller admits that he was apprehensive when the Emmerdale writers approached him and told him they were making Aaron gay. Miller said "Being a straight actor and having to kiss another lad, I'm not going to lie, I was a bit worried about it, because it's a great test of your acting skills."

Miller's co-star, Dominic Brunt has praised the storyline and told Media and Entertainment website, Digital Spy, that "It's done more realistically than I've seen in a soap." He went on to describe Aaron as being a homophobic homosexual, who does not like what he is. Miller has stated that he is enjoying the challenge presented by the storyline saying "It's definitely been a big challenge – I feel a big responsibility to get this right and portray it in a way that makes it real, because there are so many lads who are going through what Aaron is going through". Miller's co-star James Sutton, who previously played a gay character in Hollyoaks, has said that Miller did not need any advice for the role and said, "We've chatted but I've given him no advice – he's a great actor, he doesn't need me to give him any pointers".

Emmerdale producer Gavin Blyth explained the gay plotline to Miller saying, "There are hundreds of thousands of teenage lads out there who are struggling with it as we speak – they're sexually confused". He also added "Aaron keeps it in so much because he's worried about what people think of him". Miller has admitted that he felt "awkward" and "strange" when he filmed an intimate moment with his Emmerdale co-star Adam Thomas, who is his real-life flatmate. He said "You'd never think yourself to be in the position that these two are in. Knowing myself and knowing Adam and his long-term girlfriend, he's the last person you'd expect in that position."

=== Departure (2012) ===
On 18 November 2011, Miller announced he would be leaving Emmerdale in 2012. Of his decision to leave, Miller said "It has been an incredibly difficult decision but after three years playing Aaron and much soul-searching, I am eager to explore other roles. I am so grateful to Emmerdale for the opportunity that I have been given and have loved every moment. I will miss everyone enormously but this might not be the last we see of Aaron." Series producer Stuart Blackburn said he respected Miller's decision and was grateful for the hard work he had put into the role of Aaron. On 20 January 2012, Miller revealed the Emmerdale team were still discussing how to write out Aaron. The actor said "They keep chopping and changing [it] – I think because they want to make it quite impactful and dramatic. I hope it's not leaving in the back of a cab, but there's great storyliners and a great team there."

Miller and other members of the cast and crew were spotted filming Aaron's final scenes at Robin Hood Airport. Paul Millar of Digital Spy reported that Aaron's final scenes could see him on the run from the police after being accused of setting fire to the garage. Aaron made his last screen appearance on 5 April 2012.

In honour of his departure, the cast and crew made a parody video for the song "Written in the Stars" by Tinie Tempah.

=== Reintroduction (2014) ===
On 4 April 2014, Daniel Kilkelly from Digital Spy reported that Miller would be returning to Emmerdale. Kilkelly said that while producers had yet to officially announce the news, a show insider had confirmed Miller's return. Aaron will make his on-screen return later in the year. Aaron returned on 14 August 2014 to help Adam out of a scam that he was involved with Ross Barton and Donna Windsor.

=== Child sexual abuse ===
On 21 January 2016, a new story arc for Aaron began when he revealed to his ex-lover Robert Sugden that he was raped by his father, Gordon, when he was a child. Aaron explained to Robert that Gordon repeatedly raped him throughout his childhood from the age of 8 before Gordon kicked him out. Two weeks later on 3 February 2016, Aaron tells his mother Chas what Gordon did to him. After the emotional episode aired, Miller was overwhelmed by the response to his child abuse storyline with fans and co-stars praising his performance on Twitter. On 16 February 2016, it was announced that a new character would become involved in the storyline with Aaron; newcomer Ryan Harred (played by George Sampson). A week later, it's revealed that Robert paid Ryan to lie about being abused by Gordon in order for the police to charge him. On 15 April 2016, the jury found Gordon guilty of raping Aaron.

=== Car crash stunt ===
In May 2016, new Emmerdale producer Iain Macleod reveals Aaron will be heavily involved in the big October storyline along with Robert. Aaron and Robert will be caught in explosive and heartstopping twists. Iain says, "It's a massive, big storyline for Robron. It's funny, romantic and heartstopping in places. People will be on the edge of their seat – or possibly falling off the end of it. I think viewers want us to keep them together and they have earned the right to be together for a period. Obviously, there will be challenges, but I’m really rooting for them, I hope that they can make it through!"

=== Departure (2021) and return stint ===
On 16 November 2021, ITV announced that Miller would be competing in their competition series I'm a Celebrity...Get Me Out of Here!, meaning that a temporary exit for Aaron was speculated. However later that day, it was announced that Miller would not be returning to Emmerdale following his participation in the competition. Aaron's exit scenes were broadcast on 6 December 2021, as he leaves the village following the death of his partner Ben Tucker (Simon Lennon). However, under a year later, it was announced that Miller would reprise his role as Aaron for a guest stint in October 2022, as part of Emmerdale's 50th anniversary celebrations.

=== Permanent return (2023) ===
Miller made an unannounced return on 9 October 2023, revealed to be his uncles Cain and Caleb Miligan (William Ash)'s hostage at Wylies Farm.

== Storylines ==
=== 2003–2006 ===
When Aaron (Danny Webb) was young, his parents, Gordon Livesy (Gerard Fletcher) and Chas Dingle (Lucy Pargeter), separated and Chas left her son to live with his father and Gordon's second wife, Sandra (Janet Bamford). Aaron visits his mother in Emmerdale, where he tells her that he resents her for not raising him and explains that he feels that she abandoned him. The two begin to bond, before Aaron returns home to his father. Aaron returns to visit Chas, but she reprimands him after she catches him talking to other people about her behind her back.

Louise Appleton (Emily Symons) witnesses Chas slapping Aaron and tells Gordon when he arrives to collect his son. Gordon tells Chas that her relationship with her son is over and that Aaron will not visit her again. Despite this, Aaron returns to Emmerdale several months later, staying longer than expected as he came into contact with a person who had German measles and Sandra was pregnant. Aaron returns home to his father and his stepmother, after telling Chas that while she was in the Army, her partner Carl King (Tom Lister) had a one-night stand with her cousin, Del Dingle (Hayley Tamaddon).

=== 2008–2012 ===
Aaron (now Danny Miller) returns to the village two years later and is arrested by Ross Kirk (Samuel Anderson) for possession of drugs. He is cautioned then meets his mother but later runs away after Chas takes him home. Gordon reveals that he threw Aaron out for hitting Sandra, Chas' family learn that he is a drug courier for the McFarlanes and they bring him to Emmerdale after Gordon refuses to take him back.

Aaron clashes with Victoria Sugden (Isabel Hodgins) but they eventually become friends and Aaron helps rescue her when she falls into a frozen lake. Aaron convinces his cousin, Belle Dingle (Eden Taylor-Draper), to take the day off school and is also caught stealing so Lisa (Jane Cox) throws him out. Consequently, he and Chas move into Smithy Cottage with Paddy Kirk (Dominic Brunt) and Chas gives him the choice of going to college or getting a job so he gets a job at Cain's garage. Aaron begins dating Victoria and loses his virginity to her but they break up when he discovers her relationship with her foster brother, Daz Eden. When Aaron ignites a bale of hay at the Bartons' farm Holly's father, John (James Thornton), hits him and locks him in a stable. Aaron reports John to the police but later drops the charges.

Aaron discovers that Chas has resumed her relationship with Carl and he tells her that he wants nothing more to do with her. He refuses to move in with her and Carl and, after much convincing, gets Paddy to agree to let him stay with him. In anger over his mother's new relationship, he tampers with the brakes on Carl's car, but when he realises that Jimmy and Nicola King are driving it with their infant daughter, he stops them and fixes it. When Chas finds out, she angrily tells him that she does not want anything to do with him anymore. After this, Aaron slowly starts to change into a better person. Despite Paddy's initial annoyance at his presence, the two form a close father-son relationship.

Aaron begins dating Holly Barton (Sophie Powles) and makes friends with her brother, Adam (Adam Thomas). After Aaron and Adam are involved in a run-off-road collision, Aaron tries to kiss Adam. Aaron is embarrassed and tells Adam that he misunderstood the situation. Aaron sleeps with Holly and Adam tells his family that he thinks Aaron is gay. Adam tells Aaron that he is fine with him being gay but he does not want his sister to be used. Aaron denies it but Holly ends their relationship.

John can't believe that Aaron's gone to the police because as far as he's concerned, this lad has started a fire in his barn and all he's done is dealt with it in an old-school way by putting him in the stable to cool off... John could have phoned the police himself but he's not that sort of guy. The fact that Aaron reports him for assault and false imprisonment is absolutely shocking to him.

— James Thornton (John Barton) discussing a 2009 storyline in which Aaron ignited a bale of hay at the Barton family's farm

Aaron visits a gay bar and meets Jackson Walsh (Marc Silcock), he leaves his phone behind and Jackson returns it. Aaron returns to the bar to meet Jackson. When Paddy discovers that Aaron has visited a gay bar, he asks if Aaron is gay, only for Aaron to violently attack him. Aaron apologizes and admits that he is gay but rejects his sexuality. Jackson comes to the village to talk to Aaron. They go to kiss but are interrupted. After a night out at the bar Jackson and Aaron eventually kiss. Jackson comes to The Woolpack and when he touches Aaron's arm, Aaron punches him. Aaron is charged with ABH and told that he will stand trial. Aaron tries to kill himself at the garage but his uncle, Cain Dingle (Jeff Hordley), and Adam find him in time. During his court case Aaron admits that he hit Jackson because he himself is gay and struggling with this situation, Aaron is sentenced to community service. He meets Wayne Dobson (Gary Hanks) who taunts him about his sexuality, back in the village Jackson witnesses this and sticks up for Aaron. After talking things through, Aaron and Jackson start dating.

Aaron sells a clocked car to Mickey Hall (Lee Oakes). Aaron uses his dog, Clyde, to try to intimidate Mickey but Mickey sets his own dog on Clyde, seriously injuring him, so Clyde had to be put down. Jackson and Aaron argue and Jackson tells Aaron that he loves him. Aaron thinks things are becoming too serious and the pair do not talk for days. Aaron and Jackson invite Paddy and Marlon Dingle (Mark Charnock) on a night out. Jackson is hurt when Aaron does not say he loves him too and after realising that Aaron will not change his violent tendencies, Jackson drives off. Aaron tries to phone him and later finds Jackson has crashed his van onto a railway and has been hit by a train. Jackson is permanently paralysed from the neck down and Aaron tells him that he will not walk again as Jackson's mother, Hazel Rhodes (Pauline Quirke), cannot do it. Jackson blames Aaron for the crash and they break up, Aaron refuses to see Jackson, even when Hazel asks him to.

Aaron and Jackson get back together and Aaron helps Jackson and Hazel move into Dale Head. Jackson's mood starts to deteriorate and he pushes Aaron away. Aaron meets Flynn Buchanan (Ryan Prescott) and he feels like he is cheating on Jackson. Aaron tells Flynn about Jackson and that he cannot forget about him. Aaron then tells Jackson that he loves him. Aaron watches Jackson's video diary and is shocked to hear Jackson admit that he wants to die, he tells Hazel and they try to work out how to help Jackson. Aaron confesses to Jackson that both he and Hazel have watched his video diary. Aaron and Hazel then become determined to show Jackson that he has a life worth living. Jackson is admitted to hospital with a chest infection and it strengthens his resolve to end his life. Jackson, Aaron and Hazel go to Whitby and Aaron books Jackson on a tandem skydive. Aaron thinks Jackson has changed his mind about dying, but he has not. Aaron is shocked to learn that Jackson has managed to convince Hazel to help him end his life. Jackson later promises Aaron that nothing is going to happen until Aaron is ready. Jackson breaks up with Aaron to make the process easier and Aaron agrees to help Jackson end his life. Jackson tells his mother and Aaron how grateful he is for their support and – when Hazel cannot give Jackson the pills – Aaron takes the cup and gives it to Jackson. Jackson then dies and Aaron runs through the village. He then tells Adam about Jackson's death and his part in it.

The police investigate Jackson's death and arrest Aaron for murder. Aaron is forced to miss the funeral as he is due in court. He is released on bail and he goes to Jackson's grave to say goodbye. At his trial, Aaron is found not guilty of murder. However, Aaron blames himself for Jackson's death and starts lashing out at people. Aaron breaks into Carl's house with the intention of getting arrested, but Carl does not press charges. Aaron moves into The Woolpack with Chas and begins self-harming. During a drive Aaron starts speeding and crashes the car, Chas suffers minor injuries. When Sean Spencer (Luke Roskell) steals money from the garage Aaron chases after him then collapses. When he recovers Chas tries to get him to open up to her about his problems, later she catches Aaron self-harming and he starts attending counselling sessions. He also takes a break from the village for a while.

Aaron meets Ed Roberts (Lloyd Everitt) when he brings a minibus to the garage to be fixed and they slowly begin a relationship. Ed tells Aaron that he has been signed for a French rugby club and is leaving for France in four weeks. He asks Aaron to come with him but he turns him down. Aaron later spots a fire in the garage and helps Adam save Cain, who had become trapped. Aaron then learns Adam deliberately started the fire and, not wanting his friend to be sent to prison, tells the police that he was responsible for the fire. He is released on bail but on the day of his court hearing, Aaron goes to France with Ed.

=== 2014–present ===
Aaron returns to stop Adam Barton from joining a robbery with Ross Barton (Michael Parr) and Donna Windsor (Verity Rushworth). After the robbery and Donna's death, Adam confesses to the garage arson so that Aaron can come home. Aaron is arrested for perverting the course of justice but gets a suspended sentence and moves into The Woolpack with Chas. He has a one-night stand with Finn Barton (Joe Gill), then starts an affair with Robert Sugden (Ryan Hawley), who is engaged to Chrissie White (Louise Marwood). When Katie Sugden (Sammy Winward) tries to expose the affair, Robert pushes her and she dies. Aaron helps him cover it up and begins to self-harm. After Robert is shot, Aaron is arrested for hiding the gun to protect his mother and is remanded in custody until Robert makes a false statement to get him released.

Aaron's father, Gordon (Gary Mavers), visits the village. Aaron tells Robert and then Chas that Gordon raped him as a child. He agrees to go to the police to stop Cain Dingle from taking revenge. A second victim comes forward, and Gordon is found guilty and sentenced to 18 years. Aaron changes his surname to Dingle and takes in his half-sister, Liv Flaherty (Isobel Steele). Gordon later takes his own life in prison.

Aaron and Robert become engaged after a car crash into a quarry, and Aaron buys The Mill for the three of them. He gets drunk and beats Kasim Sabri after misreading an argument as a homophobic attack on Finn, and he is jailed for 12 months. They marry in a private exchange of vows in the Woolpack. In prison Aaron hides his sexuality, is bullied by the inmate Jason, who reveals he pushed Gordon to suicide, and he starts taking drugs. His appeal succeeds and he is released, but he has panic attacks and starts counselling. He discovers that Robert slept with Rebecca White (Emily Head) and that she is pregnant. Unable to cope, he ends the relationship. Robert and Rebecca's son, Sebastian, is born, and Aaron starts dating Dr Alex Mason before leaving him for Robert in early 2018.

After Rebecca is injured in a car crash, Aaron and Robert help care for Sebastian. They get engaged a second time and marry legally in the village. Aaron grieves when Chas's baby, Grace, dies shortly after birth. Rebecca moves to Liverpool with Sebastian after a custody fight. Aaron and Robert plan to have a child through surrogacy, but the plan is put on hold when Robert's sister Victoria Sugden is raped by Lee Posner (Kris Mochrie). When Lee admits it, Robert hits him with a shovel, and Lee dies. Aaron goes on the run with Robert, but Robert turns himself in to give Aaron his freedom. Robert pleads guilty to murder and is sentenced to life with a minimum of 14 years. He ends contact and files for divorce, hoping Aaron will move on. Aaron clashes with Lee's mother, Wendy (Susan Cookson), and brother, Luke, who move into the village, and has a series of one-night stands before reuniting with his family. He becomes godfather to his half-sister, Eve.

== Reception ==
For his portrayal of Aaron, Miller was nominated for the "Best Newcomer Award" at the Inside Soap Awards in 2009. Miller won the "Best Actor" award at the 2011 British Soap Awards, he was also nominated for "Sexiest Male". Miller was nominated in the category of "Serial Drama Performance" at the 2012 National Television Awards. The character was selected as one of the "top 100 British soap characters" by industry experts for a poll to be run by What's on TV, with readers able to vote for their favourite character to discover "Who is Soap's greatest Legend?". Miller was nominated for Best Actor for the 2015 British Soap Awards and won the 2014 Best Moment in All About Soap Awards (with Ryan Hawley, who played Aaron's on-off lover Robert). He won the Best Actor Award at the 2015 TV Choice Awards. In August 2017, Miller was longlisted for "Best Actor" at the Inside Soap Awards, while he and Hawley were longlisted for "Best Partnership". Both nominations made the viewer-voted shortlist. On 6 November 2017, Miller won the accolade for "Best Actor". Aaron's pairing with Robert won the accolade for "Best Soap Couple" at the 2018 Digital Spy Reader Awards.

A writer for Holy Soap said Aaron's most memorable moment was "His realisation about his sexuality and the emotional scenes where he told Paddy the truth." Miller revealed that he had been verbally abused in public for portraying a bad boy and a homosexual. He stated some viewers initially found it difficult to differentiate between character and actor. Miller said, "I get the odd bit of trouble here and there but nothing that I can't handle. I get people shouting stuff, names in the street, but nothing serious." He added, "There are people who think I'm the character but when they realise you're not they warm to you." Sarah Ellis of Inside Soap said that "given the impact he's had on Emmerdale, Aaron's farewell was always going to be an emotional one." The writer said that she and all of her colleagues from the publication will miss him. Ellis added that she would also "love" to watch Aaron in a spin-off series set in France. In 2014, Matt Bramford from What to Watch put Aaron on his list of the 18 best recastings in British and Australian soap operas. A reporter writing for the Inside Soap Yearbook 2017 named Aaron's "abuse agony" as one of the "best bits of February", describing viewers as being left "stunned" when he revealed he was abused by his father. They praised the scenes between Aaron and Chas at the seaside.

== See also ==
- List of soap operas with LGBT characters
