= Cain Dingle =

Fictional character from Emmerdale

- Emmerdale character
- Jeff Hordley as Cain Dingle
- Portrayed by: Jeff Hordley; James Prentice (2017 flashback); Aiden Kane (2022 flashback)
- Duration: 2000–2006, 2009–present
- First appearance: Episode 2674; 30 March 2000
- Introduced by: Keith Richardson (2000); Steve Frost (2009)
- Spin-off appearances: Emmerdale: The Dingles For Richer for Poorer
- Crossover appearances: Corriedale (2026)
In-universe information
- Occupation: Mechanic; Businessman; Farmer; Career criminal
- Father: Zak Dingle
- Mother: Faith Dingle
- Stepmother: Lisa Dingle; Joanie Wright
- Half-brothers: Nathan Dingle; Butch Dingle; Ben Dingle; Caleb Miligan; Sam Dingle
- Half-sisters: Chas Dingle; Tina Dingle; Belle Dingle
- Wife: Moira Barton (2014–present)
- Sons: Nate Robinson; Kyle Dingle; Isaac Dingle
- Daughters: Debbie Dingle
- Stepsons: Adam Barton; Matty Barton
- Stepdaughters: Holly Barton
- Grandsons: Jack Sugden
- Granddaughters: Sarah Sugden; Frankie Robinson
- Grandfathers: Jedediah Dingle
- Grandmothers: Peg Dingle
- Uncles: Shadrach Dingle; Albert Dingle; Caleb Dingle; Ezra Dingle
- Nephews: Aaron Dingle; Vinny Dingle; Nicky Miligan; Samson Dingle
- Nieces: Eve Dingle; Steph Miligan (adoptive)
- First cousins: Marlon Dingle; Eli Dingle; Mandy Dingle; Lilith Dingle; Del Dingle; Gennie Walker
- Other relatives: Charity Dingle; Ryan Stocks; Noah Dingle; Moses Dingle; Leyla Sugden

Cain Dingle is a fictional character from the British ITV soap opera Emmerdale, played by Jeff Hordley. Cain made his first appearance on 30 March 2000, and in 2006, he was written out of the series when Hordley left the soap; however, the option for a return was confirmed, which occurred when Hordley returned to the cast in February 2009. Cain's main storylines have focused on discovering his "uncle" Zak Dingle (Steve Halliwell) is his father; his relationship with his cousin Charity Dingle (Emma Atkins); discovering he is Debbie Dingle's (Charley Webb) father; his affair and subsequent relationship with Moira Barton (Natalie J. Robb); being attacked in a whodunit storyline where his assailant was eventually revealed to be his father; being diagnosed with a brain aneurysm; supporting his nephew Aaron Dingle (Danny Miller) after discovering Aaron was sexually abused by his father Gordon Livesy (Gary Mavers) as a child; reuniting with his and Chas' mother Faith Dingle (Sally Dexter); his relationship with local vicar Harriet Finch (Katherine Dow Blyton); building up a relationship with his children; being blackmailed by DI Malone (Mark Womack) to do drug runs for him; his feud with Al Chapman (Michael Wildman) and taking blame for Al's murder to protect his younger son Kyle who was responsible for killing Al.

== Creation and casting ==
In 2000, series producer Kieran Roberts introduced three new members of the Dingle family. The new characters made their first appearance at the funeral of Butch Dingle (Paul Loughran). Among them were Cain (Jeff Hordley), son of Zak Dingle (Steve Halliwell) and Faith Dingle (Gillian Jephcott). Cain's cousin/one-time lover is Charity Dingle (Emma Atkins), and Zak's brother is Shadrach (Andy Devine). In April 2006, it was announced that Jeff Hordley had quit, however, the door was left open for a possible return in the future. In January 2009, it was announced that the character would be brought back in April that year after a three-year break. Speaking to Digital Spy about his return, Hordley said "I am really looking forward to returning to Emmerdale. The storylines that led to Cain's return are in keeping with his character and a perfect way to bring him back to the heart of the Dingle clan where he belongs". Hordley later said that he initially turned down a return but when he was approached on the matter he approved of the storyline and felt like "the time was right for me". Lucy Pargeter, who plays Cain's sister Chas Dingle, commented on Hordley's return, saying, "I really hope that they get us together and give us a storyline which highlights the strength between them" before adding that Hordley is "amazing and everyone's so excited that he's coming back". James Prentice briefly portrayed Cain in a special flashback episode that showed Cain's childhood, which was originally broadcast on 17 November 2017.

== Development ==
=== Characterisation ===
Cain is a master criminal and the bad boy of the village. He's been involved in many scams (mostly involving money) and been to jail on more than one occasion, however, he's not evil to the core and has developed a conscience in recent years but still portrays evil in Emmerdale. Despite his difficult relationship with his daughter Debbie, he would do anything for her.

— itv.com on Cain.

The character was labelled a "ruthless hard man", a "bad boy" and a "villain" by Digital Spy. Itv.com also described Cain as the "village pariah" and commented that he likes "being in charge" but dislikes "being made a fool of". What's on TV described him saying "a villain through and through, Cain Dingle will even cross his own family if it's worth his while!" Cain has also been described as the "village's unmistakable bad boy". When casting a new family for the serial, one character specification described Cain as: "ruthless, unscrupulous, and extremely promiscuous". Hordley said Debbie is Cain's Achilles' heel who he would "move mountains for" while "women are his other Achilles heel, but he won't move mountains for them".

=== Relationship with Charity Dingle ===
Upon Cain's return to the village, he and Charity reunite. Charity proposes on Christmas Day to which Cain accepts, even though they're family. Hordley explained that the couple can't see they are made for each other as they are "so busy competing and getting one up on each other" which means that they fail to see that they are "the same". Atkins said Charity asked Cain to marry her to "prove a point". On a storyline in which Cain and Charity plan to carry out a scam Atkins said it would make the audience question "will they/won't they pull it off" before adding that it is a "Bonnie and Clyde storyline but without the deaths!" Hordley said he and Atkins "spark off and bounce off" each other which Hordley added made it "easier for me to act with her". Atkins added that she felt "having a good rapport in that way both on and off screen is vital". Digital Spy described the relationship as "volatile".

=== Reintroduction ===
Hordley said Cain's return is his way of "coming back unannounced", and added, "Cain's style is to surprise people, but there has been involvement in the storyline as he was the one to get Debbie released from prison". Hordley felt that upon Cain's return "everyone's moved on". He added that Cain "looks down on" Aaron Livesy (Danny Miller), and that Aaron is "like a little puppy looking up to Cain, thinking that his uncle's the bee's knees". He also stated, "There's a great relationship going to build there. Aaron stands for everything Cain was – he's a younger version of him and Cain recognises that. There's definitely lots of undiscovered territory there". On Cain and Chas's relationship Hordley also felt that it "hasn't really been explored"; even though they have been in the serial a long time together the relationship is still "non-existent". This left "so much scope" and "with Aaron being involved, too. There certainly should be more involvement and I'm hopeful there will be". On Cain's relationship with Debbie, Hordley said the relationship was "true to the character's roots". He added that Cain will "do whatever it takes to look after that girl. If there's one Achilles heel of Cain, it's his daughter. It's his weakness and he'll move mountains for her". Hordley also felt that Cain's relationship with Charity was "going to be a big thing" and that he expected there would be "a lot of stuff between Charity, Debbie and Cain".

=== Who attacked Cain? ===
In 2011, it was announced that Cain would become part of a "major" storyline where he is attacked by a "mystery" assailant in a "whodunit"-style storyline. The storyline developed after Cain had made several enemies throughout the year and forced one of his enemies to "take the ultimate revenge". Producers stylised the plot as a "whodunit storyline" which would keep viewers guessing as to whom the attacker was. The potential suspects were revealed to be John Barton (James Thornton), Moira Barton (Natalie J Robb), Jai Sharma (Chris Bisson), Amy Wyatt (Chelsea Halfpenny), Zak Dingle (Steve Halliwell) and Charity Dingle (Emma Atkins). A spokesperson for the serial stated that the characters had become "sworn enemies" of Cain, all "pushed to the limit after months of manipulation and destruction". Emmerdale's executive producer Stuart Blackburn said that the climax of Cain's actions "will be one of our most dramatic episodes this year" as viewers decide who took "matters into their own hands". The attacker was revealed to be Zak Dingle, Cain's father.

== Storylines ==
=== 2000–2006 ===
Cain Dingle first arrived in Emmerdale to attend the funeral of his late cousin Butch (Paul Loughran). Afterwards, Cain became sworn enemies with local businessman Chris Tate (Peter Amory) as the latter is blamed by the Dingles for his company's involvement in Butch's death – up to the point where Cain punches Chris in front of everyone at a press statement at one stage. Cain also harbors a grudge against policewoman Angie Reynolds (Freya Copeland) over the circumstances behind Butch's death and seeks revenge against her. He does this by seducing Angie's daughter, Ollie (Vicky Binns), and manipulating her into believing that he cares, despite sleeping with her mother. When Angie dumps Cain, he has her fired, has a steamy session with Ollie, and critically injures their family patriarch Len Reynolds (Peter Martin) after shoving him down a flight of stairs. Determined to get her own revenge, Angie goes along with Cain's plan to rob a Tate Haulage truck but she sets him up and is fatally injured in a car crash. He begs her to tell him she loves him but she tells him how much she loves her children.

It soon transpires that Cain had an incestuous fling with his cousin Charity Dingle (Emma Atkins) back when they were teenagers. He is later outraged when Charity begins dating Chris and attacks her for this, but she marries Chris regardless. Cain's resolve to complicate things in their marriage comes out of coincidence when local residents Paddy (Dominic Brunt) and Emily Kirk (Kate McGregor) foster a preteen schoolgirl, Debbie Jones (Charley Webb), in the village and the trio closely befriend the Dingles. When Cain sees a picture of Debbie's biological mother, he realises that Debbie is his and Charity's daughter. He blackmails Charity, threatening to tell Chris, so Charity tells him and spends time with Cain – eventually rekindling their affair and Chris catches them. Cain and Debbie leave the village but return so he can clear his name and admit his love for Charity; she ends the relationship when she realises she cannot live with him while on bail, due to pregnancy. She moves on to Tom King (Ken Farrington), and they plan to marry. Sadie King (Patsy Kensit), Tom's daughter-in-law, hires Cain to make Tom think Charity has been unfaithful but Charity clears her name and leaves the village. Sadie and Cain end up in bed; when she rejects him, he kills her dog.

Cain and Debbie move into Butler's Farm with local farmer Andy Sugden (Kelvin Fletcher). At somepoint Debbie dates Andy and they have sex on a brief occasion, which soon results in a daughter Sarah. Unlike Debbie, who lets Emily adopt Sarah, Cain bonds with her. Cain attempts to hurt Debbie by having a brief relationship with her friend/girlfriend Jasmine Thomas (Jenna-Louise Coleman) and ensuring that Debbie sees them together. Debbie and Sadie help Jasmine terminate her pregnancy, knowing that Cain wanted to be a father.

Cain and Sadie damage the King's River Show Home; when Sadie rejects him, he tells Jimmy that she paid him to vandalise the house and they are together. When Sadie confronts him, Cain threatens to tell Matthew as well so Sadie tells Ashley that Cain got Jasmine pregnant. The Dingles throw him out and allow Debbie to return. Cain leaves the village, unaware that he has damaged the show home's gas pipe. Despite Jimmy's temporary repair, the house explodes and kills Dawn Woods (Julia Mallam), Noreen Bell (Jenny Tomasin) and David Brown (Peter Alexander). Cain tells the police that he killed Alice so Samson will not lose both parents and his family forgive him (including Debbie), and Sadie bails him out. They plan revenge on Tom and Matthew King (Matt Healy) by plotting to kidnap Tom. Debbie tells Cain that Sadie paid for Jasmine's abortion; after a violent confrontation, Cain follows Sadie and kidnaps her and Tom. Chas (Lucy Pargeter) confronts him but he denies any knowledge of Tom and Sadie's disappearance. With the police closing in, Cain takes them to an abandoned factory and switches cars. They follow him to a quarry, where Cain sends his car over a cliff (with Tom and Sadie supposedly inside). While the police search the lake, Cain disguises himself as an officer. After shooting Sadie, Cain forces Tom to get Chas to deliver the ransom. Debbie begs Cain to let her go with him and they part in tears. Cain gives some of the ransom money to an old woman, asking her to post it to Debbie. Surprised by the woman's honesty, Cain realises he wants to change. At the airport, he gets on a plane and leaves Sadie behind, telling her that he does not want to continue as he was. He leaves Debbie a message that he has left Sadie, asking her to ignore what others say and telling her that he loves her more than he shows. On her 18th birthday, Cain sends her a silver watch.

=== 2009– ===
In February 2009, Cain returns to support his daughter Debbie as she is on remand for murdering Shane Doyle (Paul McEwan). He is arrested and hires a solicitor for Debbie who tells him that Andy is refusing her access to Sarah. Cain supports his daughter Debbie in her successful custody battle and tempts Maisie Wylde (Alice Coulthard), despite her parents' disapproval. After having a relationship with Maisie, Cain flirts with Faye Lamb (Kim Thomson). When he refuses to return money to Jimmy (Nick Miles) and Carl King (Tom Lister), they beat him up.

Cain dislikes Debbie's boyfriend, Michael, and learns that he is marrying his pregnant fiancée. Cain and Debbie arrive at the church and learn that Charity is Michael's fiancée. When Michael learns about Charity's past (and that she is not pregnant), he jilts her. Debbie invites Charity to stay with her, despite Cain's opposition. Charity and Carl plan to rob Cain but Cain and Debbie catch them and throw Charity out (after giving her the money she tried to steal). Cain returns on 22 December with gifts for Debbie and Sarah, reconciling with Charity on Christmas Day after she proposes to him.

Cain finds Mark Wylde's (Maxwell Caulfield) wallet in the woods after Mark is reported missing and blackmails his son Nathan (Lyndon Ogbourne). Sam's (James Hooton) dog, Alfie, digs up the body Nathan frames his half-brother and Natasha frames her stepson, Ryan Lamb (James Sutton) for Mark's murder, and Ryan is wrongfully convicted. Cain tells Maisie that Nathan and Natasha paid him to keep quiet and he cannot help Ryan without incriminating himself. After seeing Nathan lie in the witness box, Cain kidnaps him. When Maisie learns what her mother and brother did, she calls the police and tells them that her mother killed her father.

In April 2011, Charity ends her relationship with Cain again after he has a one-night stand with Faye and sleeps with Amy Wyatt (Chelsea Halfpenny). When he rejects her, she tells him she is pregnant so he "persuades" her to have an abortion but her pregnancy is too far advanced. Amy tells him and Victoria Sugden (Isabel Hodgins) that she had the abortion so Cain has an affair with Moira Barton (Natalie J. Robb) and tells John. Amy gives birth to Cain's son, Kyle, in a cemetery; thinking he is dead, she panics and leaves him in a phonebox. Hazel Rhodes (Pauline Quirke) and Lisa Dingle (Jane Cox) find him, and call an ambulance. Amy admits being his mother and Cain realises she lied about the abortion.

Cain dislikes Jai Sharma (Chris Bisson) so when Priya (Fiona Wade) shows an interest in him, Cain takes advantage of this. Jai accuses Cain of stealing from his parents' house and causing their father's road accident. Cain sends Jai a photo of Priya asleep nude and persuades her to report Jai to the police for assaulting her. Priya forgives Cain until she learns he is the father of Amy's baby and slept with Moira. Cain is arrested when Jai reports his threats to the police but released with a caution. Debbie throws him out and Cain confronts John, Moira, Chas and Amy before leaving the village. Cameron later finds Jai standing over Cain, now badly injured, and calls an ambulance. Cain recovers, claiming that Jai attacked him until Zak admits that he was responsible; he tells the police that a man he knew from Spain attacked him.

Cain saves Holly Barton's (Sophie Powles) life when she relapses on heroin and angers her brother, Adam (Adam Thomas). Confronting Cain at the garage, he demands an apology for what Cain has done to his family but Cain refuses. So Adam sets the garage on fire and leaves Cain to die but returns later. Cain's nephew Aaron Livesy (Danny Miller) begs Cain to tell the police the fire was an accident, and Cain threatens Adam. In 2012, Moira and Cain get together and on New Year's Day 2013, they announce their relationship by kissing in the Woolpack. In April, Moira learns that she is pregnant but miscarries. Despite this, their relationship gets stronger and Cain moves in with Moira and Adam, who adjusts to the situation. Cain is hospitalised after eating a rotten wolf, an incident which only further endears him to Moira.

In August, Debbie reunites with Cameron, angering Cain and Charity. Cain takes Cameron hostage and threatens to kill him but Debbie stops him harming Cameron. Reluctantly, Cain relents but warns Cameron that he'll be watching him. In October 2013, Cain rushes back from holiday when he learns that Cameron has laid siege to The Woolpack and is holding Debbie and Chas hostage. On his return, he is relieved to find Debbie and Chas safe and Cameron died in the siege. Cain supports Debbie through the trauma and eventually nurses her back to health. Cain resumes his romance with Moira, but later that month the man who terrorized Laurel Thomas arrives at the Bartons, injured. The man is revealed to be Ross Barton (Michael Parr), Moira's nephew, who assisted Cain in a crime he committed during his absence. Cain is not happy to see Ross but allows him to stay with him and Moira and gives him a job at the garage.

However, Cain and Moira's life is intruded on furthermore when Ross's father, James (Bill Ward), follows him to Emmerdale accompanied by his other sons, Pete (Anthony Quinlan) and Finn (Joe Gill). Cain and James instantly clash especially when Moira tells Cain that James made a pass at her in March 2014. Cain confronts James and warns him that he is keeping an eye on him. James later apologizes to Cain. Later that month, Moira proposes to Cain and he accepts. The couple get engaged and, assisted by Chas in wedding preparations, Cain and Moira set a date for 15 May 2014. They get married although James gets drunk at their reception.

In December 2014, Cain comes home from a business trip to France with bad pain in his head. He ignores it for a week, at which point he collapses and is found by Charity, who takes him to hospital. Cain is told he has a brain aneurysm and needs an operation immediately, but leaves the hospital. Returning to the village, he walks by the river but falls in after a dizzy spell. He is found by Vanessa Woodfield and Kirin Kotecha while they were walking out. Eventually, Cain recovers from his condition but is aware that the aneurysm will still exist inside his brain. Cain saves his sister, Belle Dingle after she tries to kill herself, and she is diagnosed with possibly Schizophrenia, following recent events which led to the teenager killing her best friend a year previously. Since Belle's diagnosis, Cain has been supportive towards his sister.

In June 2015, Cain and Moira discover that Charity was pregnant when she was sentenced to prison and the baby, Moses Dingle, could possibly be Cain's. Cain visits Charity in prison and questions if he is the father of her child. It is later revealed that Ross Barton is Moses's father, following a one-night stand with Charity. Cain soon finds out that Ross and Debbie have been having an affair and to stop Debbie from running away with Ross, he tells her that Ross is Moses's father. Debbie's wedding day approaches and Cain threatens Ross and warns him to leave Debbie alone. Debbie marries Pete Barton, but her affair with Ross is discovered on a recorded confession which Ross made on his mobile phone during a conversation with Debbie. Just as everyone finds out, a helicopter comes crashing through the roof of the Village Hall, leaving everyone's lives at risk. Cain and Pete carry Debbie out of the Village Hall, as she is discovered under some debris and therefore begins to fight for her life, due to serious injuries following the crash. But, Cain realises that Kyle is trapped in the debris, and goes in to rescue him, but Kyle hides from him. Cain manages to convince him to come out. Kyle eventually comes out, and Cain rescues him, just before the entire village hall collapses.

In February 2016, Cain was the third person to learn that Aaron was raped by his father, Gordon Livesy (Gary Mavers) when he was a child. The first was Aaron's ex-lover Robert Sugden (Ryan Hawley), 2 weeks later, Chas was the second person after Aaron told her. After Chas told him about Aaron's abuse, Cain drove to Gordon's house when he plans revenge on Gordon for what he did to Aaron. The next day, Cain goes to Gordon's house and punches Gordon when he returns. Cain ties him up and forces Gordon to drink vodka and take Chas' sleeping pills to make it look like he was trying to take his own life. Gordon riles Cain up so much that he picks up a chair intending to beat Gordon with it, but Aaron and Chas arrive in the nick of time to stop him. Aaron informs Cain that he wants to deal with this his way by calling the police on his father. As Aaron is giving his statement, Cain, instructed by Chas, has told the rest of the Dingles, Moira, Paddy and Adam about Aaron. When he is being questioned, Gordon tells the police that Cain tried to make him take his own life. The police arrive at Butlers to question Cain, but Chas and Moira give him an alibi.

Despite Cain's newfound role as protector of the Dingle name, due to Zak's excommunication, Chas criticizes him, citing that he hasn't bothered even glancing at Aaron since finding out he was abused and is ashamed of him. Cain tells her that this is utter rubbish and that he still loves Aaron, the problem being that whenever he looks at him, it reminds him "of what a sick, perverted man Gordon is". Alongside this newfound fatherly duty, Cain also tries to protect Debbie from long term lover (and Moria's nephew) Ross after she leaves the village and he will stop at no lengths to get in contact with her. Cain also supports Lisa as she celebrates turning 60 by divorcing Zak. However, Cain later tries being civil with his estranged father due to his troubles with Chas. Cain was in the pub when Chas accidentally reveals to everybody in the pub that Gordon abused Aaron when he was a child. After the police tell Aaron that they can't get Sandra to back Aaron up, Cain goes to the scrapyard and finds Aaron taking his frustrations out on a car. Cain tells Aaron that he loves him and wants to see Gordon face justice but not at the cost of what it is doing to Aaron, so persuades him to drop the case. Back at the woolpack Cain is present when the police tell Aaron that another of Gordon's victims has come forward.

In March 2016, Cain's car got stolen, Cain thought it was Charity or Ross. Then Cain and Moira track the car with somebody driving it. Cain and Moira chase after the driver before confronting the driver who is Holly. The following months, Cain went to the court to support Aaron. In May 2016, Cain discovers from Chas that Gordon is dead. Later, Chas went to the garage and asks Cain if he was involved of Gordon's death, Cain says no but he believes Robert could be involved. Cain and Chas went to the pub and told Aaron that they believe Robert could have had Gordon killed by paying somebody to do it but later, reveals on the next day that Gordon took his life by hanging himself.

In July 2016, after Holly relapses and becomes addicted to drugs again Moira confronts her drug dealer but falls onto a used needle causing her to believe she has contracted HIV. With Moira's help, Holly becomes clean; however, Cain is disgusted when he finds out Holly caused Moira to become contracted with HIV after he finds Moira's tablets. After that Cain walked out he tried to run James off the road the day after he walked out on Moira and kissed Charity at The Woolpack then after he moved in with Lisa Dingle and Belle Dingle at Wishing Well Cottage and after Moira ordered a divorce. Cain saved Charity's life when she tried to find Belle after she went missing following a mental breakdown, she ended up with broken ribs after a run-in with Holly's ex-boyfriend/drug dealer Dean, back at the garage Cain and Charity kissed then slept together. The following day Cain stood up for Charity in front of Zak and Lisa. Then he called Charity back to the garage he pulled her in and kissed her; then they had sex. The day after that Cain said that was another one-off. Charity said 'You'll be sending me dirty Emojis before the day's out'. They had sex again in a car but Holly Barton knocked on the garage door. They got rid of Holly. After fetching drinks for him and Charity drinks she joked 'Same time tomorrow?'.

In February 2017, Cain was shocked when his mother Faith returns to the village and help Robert and Aaron's family for his nephew and Robert's wedding, but turns bad news when his mother was accused of the murder of her husband.

In October 2018, after Joe Tate (Ned Porteous) leaves Debbie at the altar on their wedding day, Cain threatens to kill Joe if he ever shows his face again around the village and goes up to Home Farm to search for answers but sees Joe walking back into the grounds after deciding against Graham's wishes to stay away. Cain punches Joe in the face causing him to fall and hit his head on a rock which seemingly kills him. Although it is revealed several months later that Joe was still alive and that Graham helped him flee the country.

== Reception ==
At the 2002 British Soap Awards Hordley was nominated for "Sexiest Male" and "Villain of the Year". At the 2007 British Soap Awards Hordley was nominated for "Sexiest Male", "Villain of the Year" and "Best Exit". Hordley was nominated for "Best Actor" at the 2007 Inside Soap Awards. At the 2009 Inside Soap Awards Hordley was nominated for "Best Bad Boy" while Cain's and Debbie's custody battle for Sarah was nominated for "Best Storyline". At the 2010 British Soap Awards Hordley was nominated for "Sexiest Male" and "Villain of the Year". For his portrayal of Cain, Hordley was nominated in the category of "Villain of the Year" at the 2011 Inside Soap Awards. Hordley was nominated in the category of "Serial Drama Performance" at the 2012 National Television Awards, for his portrayal of Cain. In a poll to find the "most kissable soap stud" run by dating agency Dating Direct, Hordley came 6th with 1% of the vote. Hordley was nominated for "Best Villain" at the 2012 All About Soap Awards, while the "Who Attacked Cain?" storyline was voted "Best Mystery" by readers. The character was selected as one of the "top 100 British soap characters" by industry experts for a poll to be run by What's on TV, with readers able to vote for their favourite character to discover "Who is Soap's greatest Legend?"

Digital Spy reported that Hordley received a mainly positive reaction for his role. Tom Lister, who plays Carl King, said Cain is a "great character" adding that it was a "coup to get Jeff back". Duncan Lindsay from Metro praised Prentice's portrayal of Cain in the 2017 flashback episode, writing that he did well at the "mammoth job" of portraying an "iconic" Emmerdale character.

In 2022, a 2001 episode of Emmerdale aired on ITV3, and viewers branded Cain a 'pedophile' after he sleeps with 15 year old Ollie Reynolds (Vicky Binns) to get revenge on her mother Angie (Freya Copeland). Many fans demanded that Cain is axed for this. Emmerdale addressed the storyline in May 2022 when Cain opens up to Noah Dingle (Jack Downham), who had recently stalked his ex-girlfriend Chloe Harris (Jessie Elland), about how he also hurt a former partner and that what he did was wrong, although he does not tell Noah exactly what he did.
