= John Barton (Emmerdale) =

Fictional character from Emmerdale

- Emmerdale character
- Portrayed by: James Thornton
- Duration: 2009–2012
- First appearance: 17 July 2009
- Last appearance: 16 February 2012
- Introduced by: Steve November
In-universe information
- Occupation: Farmer
- Brothers: James Barton
- Wife: Moira Barton (until 2012)
- Sons: Matty Barton
- Daughters: Holly Barton
- Adoptive sons: Adam Barton
- Nephews: Pete Barton; Ross Barton; Finn Barton; Adam Barton
- Other relatives: Moses Dingle

John Barton is a fictional character from the British soap opera Emmerdale, played by James Thornton. The actor was asked to audition for the part and he called it the "most frightening audition" he had ever done. Thornton won the role of John, who was introduced to Emmerdale along with his family as part of an overhaul of the show by the series producer Gavin Blyth. The Barton family took over the running of Butler's Farm and they were described as being "sexy, modern and contemporary". Thornton made his debut screen appearance during the episode broadcast on 17 July 2009. The following year, he signed a one-year extension to his contract. In November 2011, Thornton revealed that he was to leave Emmerdale after three years and he departed on 16 February 2012.

Shortly before he arrived on-screen, Blyth described John as being "a very charismatic and modern farmer." He was a family man, who was honest and hard-working. Kate Woodward of Inside Soap called him "ruggedly handsome" and said he had a heart of gold. Thornton called his character a "proper bloke", who was quite moral. John and his family moved to the village to make Butler's Farm a success. John was good at business and employed a modern approach to farming. He and his wife, Moira (Natalie J. Robb), were childhood sweethearts and their marriage was initially solid. However, John shared a kiss with Eve Jenson (Suzanne Shaw) and two years later Moira had an affair with Cain Dingle (Jeff Hordley). John struggled to forgive Moira for her infidelity, but eventually realised that he could not be without her.

== Creation and casting ==
On 22 May 2009, it was announced a new farming family called the Bartons would be introduced to Emmerdale in July. Kris Green of Digital Spy reported the show's series producer, Gavin Blyth was introducing the new family as part of an ongoing reinvention of the soap. The family, which consisted of five members – a mother, father, two daughters and a son – took over the running of Butler's Farm. Of the family, Blyth said "I don't want to make Emmerdale a show about teenagers and young people, it's about family values. The Bartons are sexy, modern and contemporary. They're almost happy – and in soapland that's quite strange!" Natalie J. Robb was cast in the role of Moira Barton and Adam Thomas, Sophie Powles and Grace Cassidy were cast as teenagers Adam, Holly and Hannah respectively.

Former HolbyBlue actor James Thornton was cast in the role of Moira's husband, John. Thornton was asked to audition for Emmerdale when the role came through to his agent. He auditioned alongside Robb and they read scenes together. Thornton said "I thought I was just coming up for a chat so when we went on set it was mental. It's the most frightening audition I've ever done, but it must have gone well!" The actor said he had grown up with the show and was brought up twenty minutes from where it is filmed. He said his character appealed to him as he believed he would be fun to play, and there would be opportunities for him to film comedy and drama storylines. In September 2010, it was announced Thornton had signed a one-year extension to his contract.

== Development ==
=== Characterisation ===
"John is a hard-working and upstanding resident of Emmerdale. He loves his family and always wants to do right by them, although sometimes his fierce pride and quick temper can cause friction. He's certainly no soft touch and has had run-ins with a few villagers, but ultimately he's respected by most of the community."

— itv.com on John

Upon announcement of his casting, John was described as being a principled, ambitious farmer, who is trying to run a business and keep an eye on his family at the same time. Blyth quipped that John was "a very charismatic and modern farmer who's actually a success." The series producer said the character would be seen taking farming forward in Emmerdale. Thornton told a Yorkshire Post reporter that while John was a "laid-back family man", viewers could expect fireworks and feuds from him. He said "There are definitely going to be confrontations with the Dingles. John will enjoy that battle and give as good as he gets." John and his family also sparked a volatile relationship with the Wylde family. A writer for What's on TV said John was a successful, honest and hard-working farmer, who stood up for his himself and his family. While Kate Woodward of Inside Soap branded him "ruggedly handsome" and said he wanted to create a happy home for his family. Woodward added that John had a heart of gold and wanted to have fun, though he was not a push over.

Thornton told Amanda Killelea of the Daily Mirror that his character was a "proper bloke", who was quite moral. John and his family moved to the village to make a go of Butlers Farm, which John had big plans for. Thornton stated that John was good at business and he had a modern approach to farming. He was hands on and knew how to make money. When asked to describe John's approach to his work and family, Thornton said "Even though he's a business guy, he's not just about the money. He likes working hard and obviously cares about his family first and foremost. He's a genuine, grounded bloke and at the moment things are going really well for him." The actor revealed he did have some personal experience of farming as he used to help out on a farm near to where he grew up. For the role of John, Thornton had to take tractor lessons.

=== Marriage to Moira Barton ===
In their fictional backstory, John and Moira were childhood sweethearts, with the spark between them "instantaneous". It was love at first sight for the both of them and Robb commented that the couple had a "great chemistry" together. Following several dates, John and Moira married and had their three children. Robb stated that John and Moira had a lot of affection for each other, while a writer for ITV branded them a "striking yet down-to-earth couple". During an interview with Kris Green of Digital Spy, Thornton said John and Moira had a lot of fun in their youth and there had often been hints about their party lifestyle on screen. When asked if they were enough for each other, Thornton quipped "Yeah, definitely. What I love about their relationship is that she's a strong woman – she doesn't take any prisoners. She's the boss of the house and he respects that. She calls the shots!" He added that while no one knows much about the Barton's backstory, they were aware that John and Moira had a solid marriage. The actor thought John and Moira must have had their children when they were around eighteen as their family unit was quite young. During a feature of soap opera's longest marriages in 2010, Kate Woodward and Sarah Ellis stated that John and Moira had been married for twenty years. The writers added that as a couple, John and Moira had been solid and showed an easy attitude to keeping their family on an even keel.

When asked what kind of man it would take for Moira to cheat on John, Robb opined the man would have similar values to John and she thought Marlon Dingle (Mark Charnock) would be a safe bet as he is loyal and trustworthy. Thornton said he was worried the writers were going to break John and Moira up and Robb said if the characters were to split, they would find it hard to live without each other. In late 2011, John and Moira's marriage goes through a rough patch because of problems at the farm. Thornton opined that John is not giving Moira any attention because he is overworked. Moira becomes fed up of John not listening to her and the lack of communication and the distance between the couple becomes worse. Moira then begins an affair with Cain Dingle. Of why Moira puts her marriage in jeopardy, Robb revealed "She still loves John, but she feels isolated and neglected because he's stopped including her in the finances of the new business. He's changed the dynamic of their relationship." Cain later tells John what has been going on between him and Moira by dropping hints about their affair. John initially believes Cain is winding him up, but paranoia set in and he confronts his wife in a bid to get the truth. Speaking to Anne Richardson of Inside Soap, Thornton said John is shocked and heartbroken when Moira confirms she did have an affair. The situation is made worse because Moira cheated with Cain, a man hated by most residents.

John struggles to forgive Moira for her infidelity and Thornton said he makes the decision that their marriage is over and she has to go. He then asks his wife to leave their home. Allison Jones, writing for Inside Soap said John does not allow Moira to wallow in self-pity and he reminds her she was the one who threw their marriage away. The couple keep their children in the dark and Moira goes quietly. When Adam, Hannah and Holly do find out what has happened, Holly is firmly on John's side. John later has a fight with Cain in The Woolpack. On 17 November 2011, it was announced a major storyline would see Cain attacked by a mystery person and left for dead. John was named as one of six official suspects, along with Moira. Of John's motive Inside Soap's Kate White said "John's family is in ruins thank to Cain's affair with his wife, Moira. Violence erupts as the men have a vicious fight this fortnight – and when John is discovered fleeing from the crime scene with blood on his hands, it looks like an open-and-shut case!" Digital Spy conducted a poll asking viewers to select which suspect they thought had carried out the attack and John received 26.3% of the vote, placing him first in the poll.

=== Eve Jenson ===
In May 2010, John kissed Eve Jenson (Suzanne Shaw). Prior to the kiss, John had spent weeks trying to fend off Eve's advances. In an interview with What's on TV, Shaw said Eve developed a big crush on John and because they had a few things in common, it made her hopeful that he was interested in her. Both Moira and Adam noticed Eve flirting with John in The Woolpack, but they just teased him about it. Shaw revealed the attention from Eve was just a bit of fun for John, as he had some problems at home and used it as a way of escaping. Thornton told Inside Soap's Katy Moon that John was so secure in his relationship with Moira that he felt Eve was not a threat, so he did not put up any barriers. He thought Eve was "a nice girl" with nothing malicious about her, which left him open to her charms. Eve was given a job at Butler's Farm and she used that as an opportunity to flirt with John. Moira noticed and eventually warned her off when she thought Eve was getting too familiar with John. Thornton stated "I wouldn't want to get on the wrong side of Moira! Her fiery nature begins to show, but John assures her that Eve is just a tease and nothing more. John and Moira have quite an open relationship anyway, and they're both aware of their flirtatious natures in any case."

Moon quipped that John crossed a line when he confided in Eve about Holly's drug problem. Thornton agreed and said it was a stupid thing that men tend to do, he cannot keep his mouth shut despite the problem being a family secret. Cain Dingle (Jeff Hordley) later winds John up about working with Eve on the farm and does not fix his land rover properly as a joke. John refused to pay the garage bill and Thornton said despite John being warned about getting on the wrong side of Cain, he did not care. John and Eve share a kiss and Thornton explained that John gave in to Eve because he was flattered by her interest in him. John told Eve that their kiss was a mistake and she insisted that it be kept between the two of them. However, Cain saw everything and he blackmailed John into paying the outstanding garage bill. Cain later told Moira that he saw John and Eve kissing. Robb deemed John Moira's soulmate and said even though she knew he looked at other woman, she did not think he would ever act upon it. The actress added that Moira had sensed something before it happened, which made the situation worse.

=== Departure ===
"What becomes clear in this storyline is just how much John and Moira love each other, and that's what is really great about it. Because this has come off the back of the Cain and Moira storyline, it gives the whole thing a lot more power and makes it a lot more emotional."

— Thorton on John's final storyline

On 28 November 2011, it was announced Thornton was to leave Emmerdale. Of his decision to exit the soap, Thornton said "I have had a fantastic time playing John for the past three years, but it's the longest I have ever played one part and the time now feels right to move on. I have decided to leave on a high with a big exit storyline in 2012, which I'm really excited about. I will miss all my colleagues at Emmerdale and have many very fond memories of my time in the Dales." Series producer, Stuart Blackburn said Thornton had created a "truly memorable character in John" and that he would be missed. Thornton later told Daniel Kilkelly from Digital Spy that it had been a difficult decision to leave the serial, but he had decided at the beginning he would just do three years. He revealed that he was really sad about going and would miss his co-stars more than anything else. The actor said that Blackburn had been "absolutely brilliant and really understanding" about his departure.

On-screen John started to rebuild his relationship with Moira, following her affair with Cain. The couple decided to go and spend the night at a hotel together, but their car hit a patch of ice and crashed. The vehicle then slipped and fell off a ravine. Thornton revealed that he thought the storyline was "brilliant" and stated "As I learned more, I discovered that the scale of John's departure was going to be huge, and that the amount of money they were spending was massive. So I was really, really pleased. As an actor, you always want to do something that's going to grab the audience's attention." The actor explained that the crew spent three nights shooting the stunt and he was allowed to do as many of his own stunts as possible. Thornton commented that things would become "tricky" for the Barton family without John, but thought his exit would open up "brilliant opportunities" for Moira. He added "In a way, the Barton family have been quite isolated up on the farm. They have their own little world away from the village, but now it opens it all up." Thornton made his on-screen exit on 16 February 2012.

== Storylines ==
John and his family arrive in the village and move into Butler's Farm. When Rodney Blackstock (Patrick Mower) accidentally leaves his van's brakes off, it begins rolling through the village towards the shop. John tries to help Aaron Livesy (Danny Miller) stop it, but it crashes into the shop trapping three of the village residents. John then helps pull the van out of the debris using his tractor, so the villagers can be rescued. When John catches Aaron playing with a lighter in one of his barns, he hits him and locks him inside. After being released, Aaron reports John to the police and he is arrested. Moira goes to Aaron's family and begs them to get Aaron to drop the charges, and he does. John becomes worried when his lambs starting dying on the farm. When Adam confesses that there has been a chemical spill, John is furious as it incident could threaten the future of the farm and their business. Eve Jenson begins working on the farm and starts flirting with John. He ends up telling her about Holly's drug problems and when he gives her a lift home, John and Eve share a kiss, which Cain Dingle witnesses. He begins blackmailing John into paying an outstanding garage bill and later tells Moira what happened. She asks John to leave the farm, but she eventually forgives him and he returns.

John and Moira discover Holly has been thrown out of college for drug dealing and they make her work on the farm. When Rhona Goskirk (Zoe Henry) reveals that some ketamine has gone missing from her bag, John accuses Holly of taking it, but fails to find anything during a search of her room. Holly's drug problem becomes worse, but when she refuses to stop, John disowns her and she goes missing. John and Moira eventually find Holly and John tries to force her into his car, but she runs off. She eventually returns home and John and Moira decide to lock Holly her in her room, to stop her taking anymore drugs. The situation begins to affect the whole family and Moira goes out and buys some heroin to give to Holly, so she can be weaned off slowly. John becomes frustrated with the situation and when he threatens to try heroin unless she stops, Holly agrees to fight her addiction. Declan Macey (Jason Merrells) announces that he wants to sell the farm, but John refuses to leave and vows to make it into a profitable business so that he can buy it from Declan instead. The pressure of the business causes John and Moira's marriage to suffer. Cain later reveals that he has been having an affair with Moira and John tells her to leave their house.

Cain goads John into a fight and Adam later finds John walking down the road with blood on his hands. When Cain is found to have been attacked, John becomes a suspect and is arrested. He is later released due to a lack of evidence. John begins flirting with Chas Dingle (Lucy Pargeter), which causes a fight between Aaron and Adam. Moira is also unhappy that John is seeing Chas and the two women fight. John later informs Moira that he wants a divorce. When John and Chas go to have sex, John realises that he cannot go through with it and decides that he cannot live without Moira. He and Moira talk about their issues and reconcile. They tell Adam, Holly and Hannah that they are back together and they book a hotel room for them. John borrows Andy Sugden's (Kelvin Fletcher) Land Rover and he and Moira make their way to the hotel. However, John loses control of the Land Rover on some black ice and it crashes down a hillside. John and Moira are both trapped in the vehicle when Declan and Katie Sugden (Sammy Winward) discover them. Declan manages to get Moira out, before the Land Rover falls over a cliff. John is rescued and taken to the hospital, where he undergoes surgery for an aortic rupture which although was successful doctors warns the family that he still in a critical condition and that there was a risk of bleeding later on. Shortly after Moira tells him she loves him, John goes into cardiac arrest and despite doctors efforts to perform emergency surgery for another bleed, he dies.

== Reception ==
Thornton received a nomination for Sexiest Male at the 2010 British Soap Awards. In 2012, he earned a nomination for Best Exit and won Spectacular Scene of the Year for John and Moira's car accident. Of the John and Eve storyline, Inside Soap's Kate Woodward and Sarah Ellis commented "For some reason, John's head is being turned by foxy farmhand Eve. We think he needs that head read". Jane Simon of the Daily Mirror stated life was unfair when "lovely, gorgeous John" died. All About Soap's Laura Morgan called John "the fit farmer" and said "our hearts are broken" at his death. Of his final scene, Morgan explained "We couldn't hold back the tears as Moira stood over his hospital bed tenderly stroking his face, and John said they made the perfect team. And with those words he slipped away, watched by his devastated family."
