= Holly Barton =

Fictional character from Emmerdale

- Emmerdale character
- Portrayed by: Sophie Powles
- Duration: 2009–2012, 2016, 2024
- First appearance: 17 July 2009
- Last appearance: 20 November 2024
- Introduced by: Gavin Blyth (2009); Kate Oates (2016); Iain MacLeod (2024)
In-universe information
- Occupation: Waitress; Farm hand Factory worker Designer; Mechanic; Photographer
- Father: John Barton
- Mother: Moira Dingle
- Stepfather: Cain Dingle
- Brothers: Matty Barton
- Half-brothers: Isaac Dingle; Adam Barton
- Uncles: James Barton
- First cousins: Pete Barton; Ross Barton; Finn Barton
- Other relatives: Moses Dingle

Holly Barton is a fictional character from the British ITV soap opera Emmerdale, played by Sophie Powles. She made her first on-screen appearance during the episode broadcast on 17 July 2009. Holly was introduced to the soap as part of the Bartons, a new farming family who took over the running of Butler's Farm. Holly was joined by her mother, father and two siblings. The family were described as being "sexy, modern and contemporary" by the show's series producer, Gavin Blyth. Holly departed on 20 June 2012, but Powles later reprised her role and Holly returned on 24 March 2016 for a six-month stint. The character was killed off on 29 September 2016. Powles reprised her role on 20 November 2024 when she appeared in Moira's dream sequence whilst undergoing surgery.

== Creation and casting ==
In May 2009, it was announced that Emmerdale's new series producer, Gavin Blyth, would introduce The Bartons, a new farming family, as part of an ongoing overhaul of the show. The family, which comprises five members - mother, father, two daughters and a son - took over the running of Butler's Farm. Of the family, Blyth said "I don't want to make Emmerdale a show about teenagers and young people, it's about family values. The Bartons are sexy, modern and contemporary. They're almost happy - and in soapland that's quite strange!" Natalie J. Robb and James Thornton were cast in the roles of parents, John and Moira. Adam Thomas and Grace Cassidy were cast as their children Adam and Hannah.

Former Britannia High actress Sophie Powles was cast in the role of eldest daughter Holly. Powles received a call from her agent telling her about an audition for Emmerdale, which she thought was a great opportunity. Following the audition, Powles attended the subsequent recalls, before getting down to the final four. After a screen test with Robb and Thornton, Powles was given the role. Paula Lane, who would later be cast on the soap as Ella Forster, also auditioned for the role. Shortly before filming her first scenes, Powles had to go shopping for Holly's costumes and had her hair dyed brown for the part. Of her casting, Powles said "I always wanted to act and especially because it's a northern show and my family live just down the road in Otley, so I've got a strong Yorkshire connection. I did my first scene in the Woolpack and I was just amazed at how real it was and I feel so lucky to be doing a job I enjoy on a show that I love. It's really cool."

== Development ==
=== Characterisation ===
"When she arrived in Emmerdale Holly seemed just like any other teenage girl, but her growing dependence on drugs changed her personality dramatically and led her to lie and steal from her family. The old Holly was considerate and caring, but the drug-dependent Holly is more of an unknown... That makes her unpredictable."

— itv.com on Holly

Holly is described as being a "free spirit with a sense of adventure." Powles opined Holly is "the kind of girl who will get on with anybody." She becomes friends with the people she meets and does not judge a book by its cover. Holly is loyal to her family and close to her mother, who she shares a strong bond with. Holly and her brother, Adam, have grown up together and there is only a year between them. Adam is quite protective of his sister. Holly loves Hannah to bits and they enjoy teasing each other. Holly does not spend her time reading fashion magazines and she wears whatever she is comfortable in. Powles told the Liverpool Daily Post Holly "loves who she is and she's really happy. She's not image conscious and doesn't waste time thinking 'I'm too fat' or 'I'm too thin'." Upon her entrance to the show, Holly had not had a boyfriend before. Susan Griffin of the Liverpool Daily Post said she would not go short of an admirer or two, and Powles added "Holly wouldn't go for someone who was typically good-looking. She doesn't go for the obvious." The actress thought Holly may have some unexpected friendships and relationships, which would work.

When Powles was asked if she was anything like Holly in real life, she told Inside Soap, "I used to be quite similar to her when she got on well with her family and was bubbly - but now she's very moody and stroppy, I'm nothing like her!" Holly's descent into drugs changed her personality and Steve Hendry of the Daily Record noted Holly was once a girl from a good family with a cheeky twinkle in her eye and she had become a "desperate soul who is dragging her family down into the gutter along with her." Hendry pointed out Holly had acted out of character and Powles agreed, saying "When I came into Emmerdale Holly was a very bubbly character, obviously a bit cheeky and a bit naughty but never would you think she'd do drugs. That's why they picked her, to show there is no stereotype of the kind of person who gets into drugs." Powles said Holly had turned into a "nasty creature" because of the drugs. The actress believed Holly has always been fiery, but when she gets intimidated that turns into aggression, which worries her family.

=== Relationship with Aaron Livesy ===
Holly's first love interest was Aaron Livesy (Danny Miller). Aaron took an interest in Holly shortly after she arrived and he often came to the farm to see her. In August 2009, Aaron almost sets fire to a barn and he is locked up by John. Aaron has John arrested and his mother tells the Bartons that she cannot get him to drop the charges, so Holly "decides to take more direct action" by seducing him into dropping the case. However, Aaron realises what her plan is and he calls her bluff by telling her that he will drop the charges if she has sex with him. A writer for the Sunday Mail said Aaron's offer leads "a disgusted Holly to storm out", leaving him feeling guilty. A Daily Record reporter stated that Aaron appeared to have destroyed any chance he had with Holly, but she showed "incredibly bad taste in the opposite sex" by choosing to date him. Aaron later tries to kiss Holly's brother, Adam, and he struggles with his sexuality. When he asks Holly out, Adam warns his sister that she can do much better, but she does not listen and spends the evening with Aaron. During an interview with a What's on TV writer, Miller explained that Aaron uses Holly to convince people that he is not gay. When asked if Aaron fancies Holly or if he is just using her, Miller said "He does genuinely like Holly but he is sexually confused and constantly questioning himself 'Am I gay? Am I not gay? Do I want Holly? Or Adam?' It's a love triangle in the most confusing sense for Aaron. He wants to convince everyone, including himself, he isn't gay." Adam later tells Holly that Aaron tried to kiss him, but she does not believe him. Holly breaks up with Aaron when she tires of their relationship.

=== Drug addiction ===
"This is a serious, true story about cocaine and heroin. What I didn't want to do was to run a three-week storyline which sees an addition, discovery and cure in such a short space of time - that's not what happens in real life."

— Gavin Blyth on Holly's addiction storyline

In 2010, Holly became Emmerdale's first teenage drug-addict. Holly starts using drugs recreationally and she gives Maisie Wylde (Alice Coulthard) cocaine during a night out. Holly is fired from her job at Home Farm, when Maisie's mother, Natasha (Amanda Donohoe), finds out. In April 2010, Roz Fielding (Kirsty-Leigh Porter) was introduced to Emmerdale. Roz became Holly's cocaine dealer and she often joined Holly in taking the drug. Holly's drug use begins to affect her college work and she is later thrown out of college for dealing drugs. Holly decides to get clean, but she cannot resist stealing some ketamine and swapping it for cocaine. Powles told Inside Soap Holly does not like it when she is in her parents' bad books, so she tries to stay clean. However, she cannot help herself. While out clubbing with Aaron Livesy and Jackson Walsh (Marc Silcock), Holly bumps into Roz and they drink and take cocaine. Holly decides to flirt with a stranger for more drugs and she takes an ecstasy pill. Holly succumbs to the effects of the drug and she has a nasty turn. Powles explained "She locks herself in a toilet cubicle because she doesn't know what's happening to her. Holly feels her whole world is going to explode. It's a bit like an out-of-body experience for her." Powles added Holly is panicking and crying, so Aaron and Jackson kick the toilet door down and look after her. Aaron takes Holly home and she promises him it will never happen again. Powles revealed Aaron is unaware of how dependent on drugs Holly has become and the actress promised Holly would face more trouble in the future.

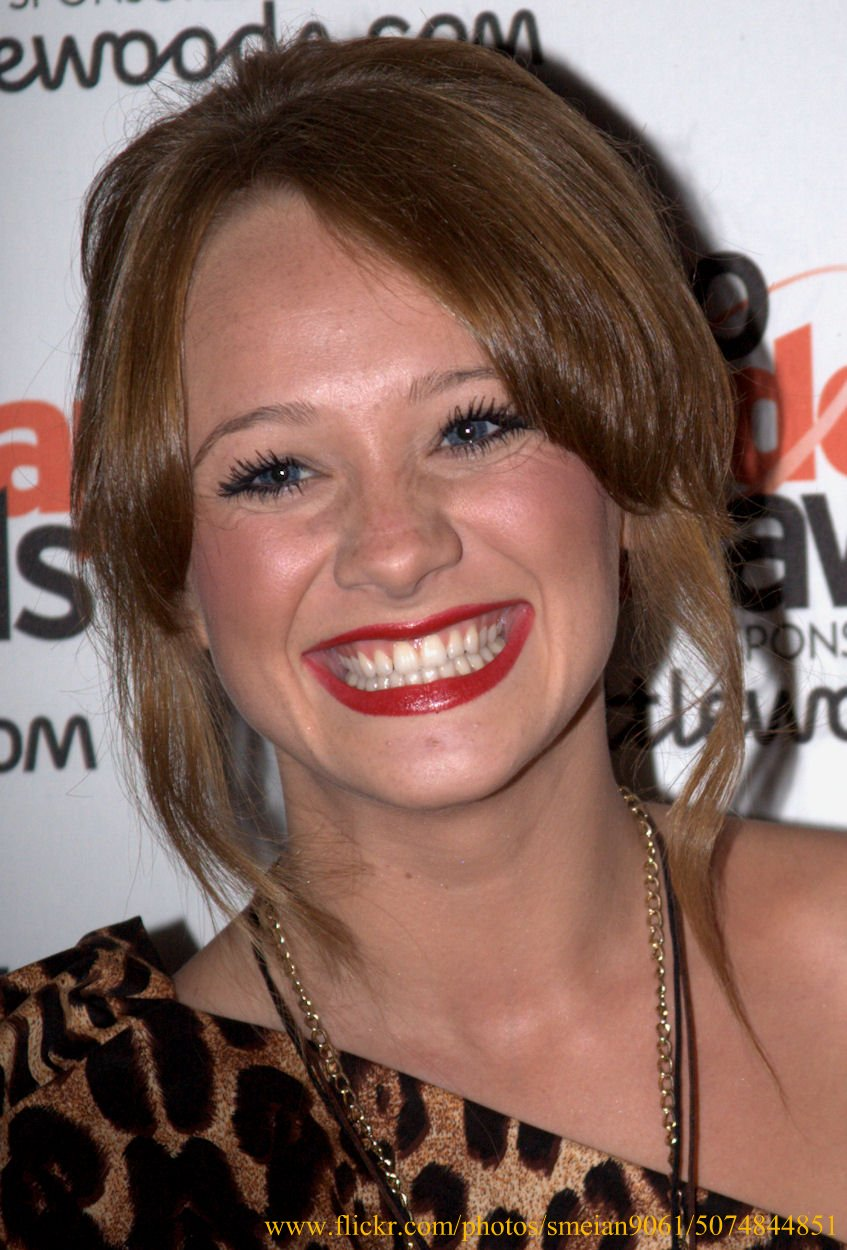
Kirsty-Leigh Porter was cast in the role of Holly's friend and drug dealer, Roz Fielding.

Powles said she has researched her character's storyline, by consulting a drug support group and talking to recovering addicts and the people who work with them. The actress said she did not have any experiences with the situation and she asked about how she should act. Holly is later disowned by her father and she runs away. Holly meets Dan Cravely (James Boyland), a drug dealer, who allows Holly to stay with him. Powles explained Dan is everything Holly wants, he may not be a nice person, but he can supply her with drugs. Powles said Holly is using drugs heavily and not being at home means she can take the drugs whenever she likes. Holly runs into Scarlett Nicholls (Kelsey-Beth Crossley) and Eve Jenson (Suzanne Shaw) in town and she asks Scarlett for money, but Scarlett lies that she does not have any. Scarlett later asks Holly to meet her, but it is a set up and John and Adam arrive instead. Powles said Holly is furious and cannot believe she fell for the trick. John tries talking to Holly, but does not get through to her and he tries to manhandle her into his car. Holly manages to escape and decides to rob her family, so she can raise money to buy more drugs. Holly and some of her friends take laptops, jewellery and other valuable possessions from Butler's Farm. Powles told Inside Soap that John and Moira are left in disbelief at what their daughter has done as they did not think she would ever do something like that. Powles opined Holly had lost all her "morals and sense of consequences" and the old Holly had gone. She added things would get worse for Holly before they get better.

"I've learned through research that people from all walks of life become addicted – those who've had terrible childhoods and those, like Holly, who come from a good family. The only clue is that she has an addictive personality. Once she tried drugs, she couldn't just take or leave them."

— Powles on how Holly became an addict

Dan eventually throws Holly out onto the streets and she heads back home. Powles told What's on TV Holly becomes more concerned about where she will get her drugs from than where she lives, but she goes to the village while under the influence of drugs. Ashley and Douglas Potts (Duncan Preston) find Holly in the graveyard and they call John and Moira to collect her. Holly starts going through cold turkey and her parents call a doctor. Powles said Holly asks for "tranquillisers, sleeping pills, anything" because she has been without drugs for weeks. Moira asks Holly to leave if she is going to continue using drugs and Powles said Holly admits she has a problem because of her mother's behaviour. When asked how tough the storyline has been, Powles replied "It's fantastic as an actress to have such a big storyline, but it's hard at times. When I get home after work I ask my boyfriend to make me laugh because I've been crying all day!" Holly decides to attend a counselling session with Moira, but she immediately resents it and during a moment alone, she runs away and buys some heroin. Holly returns home and John and Moira find her collapsed in her bedroom. They try to wake her up and she tells them she took heroin, before passing out again. Holly begins taking methadone to help her get off the drugs, but she starts craving heroin. Holly realises she has no money and sells her body to a stranger to fund her habit. Holly confesses to John and Moira about what she has done and they decide to lock her in her bedroom, forcing her to go cold turkey.

=== John's death and relapse ===
In February 2012, John dies, following a car accident. Holly struggles to cope with John's death as he was her best friend as well as her father. Powles told a writer for All About Soap that Holly lost her friends and her independence when she became addicted to drugs and John protected her. Powles explained "He kind of became her addiction, so with him gone that support has disappeared suddenly and she feels very lost and empty." Holly begins to resent Moira when she sees her lying around grieving for John because she blames her for causing a split within the family due to her affair with Cain Dingle (Jeff Hordley). However, Hannah tells Holly that if she had not got into drugs then there would not have been any tension between Moira and John in the first place. Holly and Moira have an argument when Holly washes some bed sheets that still smell of John and Powles said Holly is fed up of everyone thinking the worst of her when she is trying her best. Things become too much for Holly when the family discuss where to scatter John's ashes as she is not ready to let go and move on. Powles said "The agony's overwhelming and the only thing Holly can think of to get over the pain is to take a hit of heroin, so she succumbs - and goes out and scores a couple of wraps." Holly keeps the drugs hidden in her room as she thinks about whether to take them or not. She is tempted to have a small hit to numb her pain. Powles added that Holly does not want to cause her family anymore heartache, but she will carry "the heroin-taking ghost" in the back of her mind forever.

Holly gives in and takes the heroin after the family gather to scatter John's ashes. She is still not ready to let go and Powles told Inside Soap's Katy Moon "John's funeral was bad enough because she was trying to be strong for her brother and sister. Scattering her dad's ashes is just too much, and she feels Moira is being very pushy about it." After the family say goodbye, Holly prepares to take the drugs, but Alex Moss (Kurtis Stacey) stops her. He tells her to be strong for her family as she is the one person holding the family together. Moon stated that Holly takes Alex's words the wrong way and she feels that the only way to get through the situation is to numb the pain with heroin. Despite Alex getting rid of the drugs, he is unaware that Holly has more hidden away. She takes a hit and overdoses. Powles explained that Holly does not mean to overdose. She previously had a high tolerance for heroin, but when she uses it again after being clean for so long, her body cannot cope with it. Holly collapses near the local garage and she is found by Cain. Powles told Moon that Cain is initially reluctant to help Holly as he thinks his actions could be misinterpreted. He is worried that people will think he is doing it to try and redeem himself, but his instincts take over and he takes her to the hospital. Powles stated "The Bartons find it very difficult to swallow their pride and accept that Cain deserves their thanks, but Holly is really defensive of him." The actress added that it is "a terrible time" for the family; Moira has lost her husband, so she could not bear to lose her daughter too.

=== Departure ===
On 15 January 2012, it was announced Powles had quit her role as Holly. Her decision to leave Emmerdale came shortly after Thornton also announced his departure from the show. Of her exit, Powles stated: "I have had an awesome three years at Emmerdale. I have made the best friends and have worked, had fun and learned so much with an amazing cast and crew. But after three years I am ready for some freedom to travel and be able to say yes to other projects and opportunities. I just want to say thank-you to everyone at Emmerdale for making it such a brilliant place to work." It was also announced that Kirsty-Leigh Porter would reprise her role as Roz for Holly's exit storyline. Powles later told Claire Donnelly of The People that she was starting to feel "a bit tied down" with her routine and she got itchy feet. The actress said "People will think I'm mad giving up a job like this but I know it is the right thing for me to do." Powles continued to film until May and she made her screen departure on 20 June 2012. Holly's exit storyline sees her leave the village after accepting a job as a trainee designer in London. Holly invites Hannah to accompany her. Moira initially refuses to allow her to leave, but relents and says goodbye to her daughters.

=== Return ===
On 5 February 2016, new series producer Iain MacLeod announced that Powles had reprised her role and would be returning to Emmerdale the following month. MacLeod stated that Holly would bring "fresh trouble to the Dales" and cause trouble for her stepfather Cain. The producer continued, "Holly arrives with trouble trailing behind her and then we see Cain do what he does best, which is step in and save the day as only he can." Holly returned on 24 March 2016.

=== Death ===
On 29 September, the character was killed off after suffering a heroin overdose. Holly's mother Moira was seen struggling to wake her daughter, until she realised that Holly was dead. The storyline was not announced ahead of its broadcast, allowing viewers to be surprised. In an interview with Daniel Kilkelly of Digital Spy, Powles told him that when she was asked to return, she had known it would only be for a six-month storyline focusing on Holly's drug addiction. Powles found the storyline "challenging", but pointed out that it was "a very serious and stark warning" showing the effects that drug addiction can have on people. She also stated that Holly's addiction came about from one bad decision and her "addictive personality", which eventually got out of control. Powles added that she was proud of the storyline and hoped it would raise awareness.

== Storylines ==
=== 2009–2012 ===
Holly and her family arrive in the village and move into Butler's Farm. Holly gets a job at Home Farm, where she make friends with her employer's daughter, Maisie Wylde. She also begins studying art at college. Holly persuades Lisa Dingle (Jane Cox) to become a life model for her art class, after another model drops out. Holly meets Aaron Livesy and she is attracted to him. When Aaron accuses John of assault, Holly tries to seduce him into dropping the charges. Aaron calls her bluff and asks her to have sex with him, which she refuses to do. Holly and Aaron later go on a date and begin a relationship. Adam tells his family that he thinks Aaron is gay. Aaron denies Adam's accusations and Holly chooses to believe him. Holly later ends her relationship with Aaron. On a night out, Holly gives Maisie some cocaine. Maisie's mother, Natasha, finds out and sacks Holly, before telling her parents. When John and Moira confront Holly, she tells them she occasionally uses drugs. Holly starts taking drugs more frequently with her friend Roz Fielding, who supplies them to her. Holly is expelled from college after she fails to hand in her assignments. John and Moira find out about Holly's expulsion and learn she was dealing drugs. Holly is grounded and forced to work on the farm. She decides to stop taking drugs and earns the trust of her parents again. Vet Rhona Goskirk (Zoe Henry) visits the farm and finds some ketamine missing from her bag. John accuses Holly of taking it and searches her room, but does not find anything. Holly later retrieves the ketamine from Hannah's room, where she hid it, and swaps it for cocaine.

Holly overdoses in a toilet cubicle on a night out and Aaron takes Holly home. Holly begs him to keep her overdose a secret. Holly steals Scarlett Nicholls' purse to get money for drugs and babysits Viv Hope's (Deena Payne) children while high. Holly also steals Viv's Valium pills and Isaac Nuttall's (Jake Roche) MP3 player. Moira arranges for Holly to babysit for Laurel (Charlotte Bellamy) and Ashley Thomas' children. Holly invites Roz to keep her company. Roz is disgusted when Holly insists on taking some cocaine. On their return home, Laurel and Ashley become suspicious about Holly's behavior and later find a wrap of cocaine. Ashley tells John and Moira and they manage to persuade him not to call the police. They confront Holly and she blames Roz. Roz becomes angry and tells John and Moira their daughter has a drug problem. When Holly refuses to stop doing drugs, John disowns her. Holly disappears, but later returns to pick up some belongings. Holly runs into Scarlett in town, but she runs off when Scarlett refuses to give her money. Scarlett sends Holly a text asking if they can meet. Holly discovers she has been set her up, when John appears. He tries to manhandle her into his car, but Holly escapes and runs off. She and her friends later burgle Butler's Farm. Aaron finds Holly working in a bar in Hotten and tells Moira, who turns up and is angered when Holly shows no remorse for what she has done. Moira drags Holly into her car and takes her to the police station, where she asks an officer to arrest her. Moira changes her mind about pressing charges and Holly apologises to her parents. John and Moira later visit Holly at her new address and meet her boyfriend Dan Cravely. Dan throws Holly out, when she cannot pay her way and she returns to the village. Ashley and Douglas Potts find Holly in the graveyard and take her home. Roz comes to visit and Holly asks her for drugs, but Roz refuses to help her.

Moira takes Holly to a counsellor, but Holly excuses herself and runs away. She gets some heroin and John and Moira find her collapsed in her room. Holly later has sex with a stranger for money, so she can buy some more drugs. John and Moira decide to lock Holly her in her room and she is forced to go through drug withdrawal alone. The situation begins to affect the whole family. Moira eventually buys some heroin and gives it to Holly, so she can be weaned off slowly. When John offers to take the drug with her, Holly decides to try to get clean. She goes on a methadone programme and gets a job at the factory. When the Barton's struggle financially, they are forced to sell a car. Holly asks Cain Dingle to get a cheap 4x4 for them and Moira goes along with the plan, paying Cain back in instalments. Holly is angry when she learns Moira has been having an affair with Cain and is on John's side. However, when she realises John is flirting with Chas Dingle (Lucy Pargeter), she forgives her mother and tries to get her back with John. Holly, Hannah and Adam are delighted when John and Moira announce they are back together and they book them a hotel room for a night. They later learn their parents have been in a car accident and they rush to the hospital. Holly is devastated when John dies. Holly tries to be strong for Moira and helps out around the house. She starts to think that John's death was her fault and she purchases some drugs from a dealer. Alex Moss finds Holly in the barn with the drugs and he takes them off of her. Holly asks Alex not to tell Moira about the incident. Cain later finds Holly unconscious at the garage with some drugs beside her and he takes her to the hospital. When she wakes up, Holly tells her family that the incident was a one off and she will not take drugs again. Holly then begins seeing a drugs counsellor again.

Holly becomes disillusioned with her life in the village and decides to move to London to live with Roz, who has got a job there. Holly is also offered a job in designing. Adam is angry and believes that the family should stick together due to their father's death, but Holly is adamant that she is going and Hannah decides to join her. After a farewell drinks gathering in The Woolpack, Holly and Hannah bid farewell to Moira and Adam and leave the village.

=== 2016 ===
Four years later, Holly returns and takes Cain's car. Moira and Cain give chase and manage to intercept her. Holly apologises for taking the car; she believed it was Moira's. Holly then catches up with Adam. She later tells someone on the phone that she will have their money for them soon. Holly's ex-boyfriend Dean (Craig Vye) turns up at Butler's Farm demanding Holly pay him back for the drugs he supplied to her. Holly tries to make a deal with Charity, telling her she will split Cain and Moira up for £2000, but Charity declines. Holly then suggests that they steal the money they both need from The Woolpack safe. Holly is then attacked by Dean and is rescued by Cain, after which she then starts to develop feeling for him. She jealously ruins her mother's anniversary plans with Cain and tries to frame Charity, to cause further tension between Moira and Cain. After Cain defends Holly when Moira and Adam accuse her of stealing money from Adam's wife Victoria, Holly tries to kiss Cain. He immediately rejects her. The day after, Cain fires Holly from the garage and insists she leave the farm. Holly confesses all to Moira, but lies that it was Cain who made the first move, not her. However, Moira sees through Holly's lies and bans her from living with them. Holly leaves, asking her cousin Pete a lift.

Holly takes drugs in the village pavilion, leaving a message for Moira, telling her of her plans. Cain finds the message and, listening to only half of it, deleted it from his wife's phone. Pete and Ross found Holly unconscious, and take her to hospital. Moira arrives and Cain admits what he did. Moira chases after Holly and promises to help her through her addiction. Upon returning home, Cain tells Moira that he cannot and will not watch her daughter die. She promises Moira that she will not take it again and with her help starts to get clean. Moira falls on a used needle whilst going to confront Simon, Holly's drug dealer and believes she has contracted HIV. Holly finds support from fellow drug addict Jai Sharma (Chris Bisson) and they date in secret. They attend a wedding together, where Holly takes photographs for a friend. The next day, Moira fails to wake Holly and she later discovers Holly is dead from a heroin overdose. Moira phones the emergency services, who process the scene and take Holly's body away.

== Reception ==
In 2011, Holly's drug addiction was nominated for "Best Storyline" at the British Soap Awards. Daily Mirror writer, Tony Stewart, said Holly's drug addiction was "one of the most harrowing" storylines of 2010. He added "With a powerful and moving performance by relative newcomer Sophie Powles, Holly Barton has been transformed from a vivacious young student to a drug-ravaged, emaciated heroin addict over the last few months." Stewart's colleague, Jane Simon, said Holly was a "pretty Anna Friel look-alike." Simon later asked "If one of the Bartons had to die, why couldn't it have been vile Holly with her stupid voice like a creaky door?" Claire Donnelly of The People said Powles had made "quite an impact as junkie Holly", with some members of the public coming up to the actress and asking her for drugs in the street. In August 2017, Holly's death was longlisted for Best Shock Twist at the Inside Soap Awards. The nomination made the viewer-voted shortlist, but it lost out to the return of Andy Carver (Oliver Farnworth) in Coronation Street.
