= Sophie Powles =

British actress

- Born: 16 September 1988 (age 37); Cleethorpes, Lincolnshire, England
- Occupation: Actress
- Years active: 2001–present
- Children: 2

Sophie Powles (born 16 September 1988) is an English actress, known for her role as Holly Barton in the ITV soap opera Emmerdale.

== Career ==
Powles has guest-starred in dramas such as Holby City and Dalziel and Pascoe before landing a role in the ITV drama series Britannia High. Her character Ronnie was the only one of the main cast who was not a student at the fictional school of performing arts. Ronnie was created especially for Powles, as all the main cast were already in place. On 22 May 2009, it was announced that Powles was to join soap opera Emmerdale as Holly Barton. Powles dyed her natural blonde hair brown for the role. On 5 February 2016, new series producer Iain MacLeod announced that Powles had reprised her role and would be returning to Emmerdale the following month. However, just under seven months later in August 2016, Powles once again quit the soap, with a source stating that she "never saw her return as a long one". The actress had already filmed her final scenes at this point, and the character departed the show on 29 September 2016, when Holly was killed off. She then later took part in a theatre play called 'Rehearsal For Murder', which toured the UK.

== Personal life ==
In June 2021, Powles announced that she was pregnant with her first child. In August 2021, she gave birth to her daughter, Marli.
