= List of Emmerdale characters introduced in 2015 =

Emmerdale is a British soap opera first broadcast on 16 October 1972. The following is a list of characters that first appeared, by order of first appearance. The first character to be introduced was Emma Barton (Gillian Kearney) in January. Nurse Darren Thompson (Danny Horn) arrived in March and Lachlan White's (Thomas Atkinson) father, Donny Cairn (Alan Convy) arrived in April. The year's first birth, Moses Dingle, the son of Charity Dingle (Emma Atkins) and Ross Barton (Michael Parr), occurred in June. Jermaine Bailey (Micah Balfour) was also introduced during the same month. The second birth occurred in September as Vanessa Woodfield (Michelle Hardwick) gave birth to her and Kirin Kotecha's (Adam Fielding) child, Johnny Woodfield. Tess Harris (Nicola Stephenson), the woman whom Paddy Kirk (Dominic Brunt) had an affair with, also began appearing in September. Additionally, multiple other characters appeared in 2015.

== Emma Barton ==
Emma Barton
- Emmerdale character
- Portrayed by: Gillian Kearney
- Duration: 2015–2017
- First appearance: Episode 7070; 2 January 2015
- Last appearance: Episode 8015; 14 December 2017
- Introduced by: Kate Oates (2015); Iain MacLeod (2024)
In-universe information
- Occupation: Barmaid
- Husband: James Barton (1989–2016)
- Sons: Pete Barton; Ross Barton; Finn Barton; Lewis Barton
- Stepsons: Adam Barton
- Grandsons: Moses Dingle

Emma Barton, played by Gillian Kearney, made her first appearance on 2 January 2015. The character had previously been mentioned by her on-screen family and heard once on a family video. During a press event on 11 August 2014, series producer Kate Oates revealed that Emma would finally be introduced to the show. She said "Emma's had a bit of a build-up, hasn't she? She's the woman we haven't seen and she's a bit of a mystery at the moment. I think it's safe to say that she is going to show up, possibly in the not-too-distant future. She may cause chaos." On 2 December 2014, it was announced that Kearney had been cast in the role. The actress commented, "As an avid fan of Emmerdale, I'm delighted to be playing Emma Barton." Emma is described as "psycho" and one of the best soap villains of all time. Emma is the estranged mother of Pete (Anthony Quinlan), Ross (Michael Parr) and Finn Barton (Joe Gill), and the wife of James Barton (Bill Ward). She arrives in the village after Finn tracks her down following a 22-year absence from her family. Kearney called Emma "a fascinating and complex character", while Oates added that her appearance would "cause fireworks" for the Barton family.

On 9 May 2017, it was announced that Kearney would be leaving the role of Emma, as her character finally gets a comeuppance for her actions. Her final episode aired on 6 October 2017, where Emma was killed off in a whodunit-style storyline where she was pushed off a viaduct and murdered, however it was initially believed that the character committed suicide. Emma reappeared one last time during the 14 December 2017 flashback episode, where her killer was revealed to be Moira Dingle (Natalie J. Robb). The character made a brief return appearance on 9 September 2024, after Moira begins hallucinating during a confrontation with Ruby Fox-Miligan (Beth Cordingly) in a barn. This appearance was achieved using archival footage from 2017.

Kearney has received acclaim for her portrayal of Emma. She was longlisted for the 2015 Inside Soap "Best Bad Girl" award but did not progress to the shortlist. Kearney was nominated for Best Serial Drama Performance at the 2016 National Television Awards. In August 2017, She was longlisted for Best Actress and Best Bad Girl at the Inside Soap Awards, while the motorway crash and James' death was longlisted for Best Show-Stopper and Best Shock Twist. While Kearney did not make the Best Actress shortlist, her other three nominations made the viewer-voted shortlist. On 6 November 2017, Kearney won the "Best Bad Girl" and "Best Show-Stopper" accolades.

Harriet Finch (Katherine Dow Blyton) helps Finn find Emma's address and he meets her in secret. She is thrilled to see him and is eager to get to know her other sons again but this proves complicated, given their history. While at a bar, Ross gets into a fight and is injured. Emma comes to help Ross and is shocked to recognise her sons. Finn invites Emma to the village and Ross tells her that James and Moira slept together before she left. James is defensive and accidentally reveals that Adam Barton (Adam Thomas) is his son. Emma blames James for losing her family but he reminds her that the reason she left was because she tried to kill Ross when he was a child. Emma asks if James has told their sons the truth and he tells her he has not. Emma leaves and Pete later tells James that she returned once before, but he sent her away. Emma returns to the village and Ross and Finn try to persuade her to stay. She tries to talk to Pete but he makes it clear that he knows what she did and will not forgive her. When Finn babysits Debbie Dingle's (Charley Webb) son, Jack, Emma visits and Finn leaves her alone for a few minutes. When Pete learns this, he runs into the house and tells Emma to leave.

Emma befriends James's partner Chas Dingle (Lucy Pargeter), but remains hostile towards Moira. During an argument with James, Emma lashes out at him, causing a pallet to crash down on James and pin him under the load. Emma checks James to see if he is breathing and hesitates before calling an ambulance. Emma is defensive when Pete questions her about the accident but, thinking Emma saved James's life, Pete tells Emma that he will keep her secret and she can stay in the village. Relieved, she moves in with her sons after Ross "burgles" her house and then sets about ruining James's and Chas's relationship by making people think that they are having an affair. When Chas learns of this, she throws James out and he stays with Emma temporarily but this becomes permanent when she convinces him to give their marriage another chance. Emma then tries to make Chas think she is senile by smashing glasses in the pub and locks her in the cellar where Chas falls unconscious however Chas thinks Emma is continually breaking into the pub but is actually suffering from PTSD.

James falls down the stairs of his and Emma's new home during an argument with Ross, however while in the hospital Emma overhears a conversation between Ross and James about when he spent a night with Moira. Feeling betrayed Emma drugs James and holds him hostage in the bedroom for a week before confronting him, however she unties his hand after making him write and he hits her over the head with a glass bottle, Emma wakes up unconsciously and knocks James to the ground, in a struggle James manages to push Emma and she hits her head falling unconscious again, subsequently James believing he has killed Emma puts her in the car before stumbling away by himself. James is later in the woods by himself and Emma comes and confronts him leading them onto a bridge, after arguing and fighting. Emma accidentally pushes James from the bridge onto the motorway causing a large car pile up involving Ashley Thomas (John Middleton), Rhona Goskirk (Zoë Henry), Paddy Kirk (Dominic Brunt) and Pierce Harris (Jonathan Wrather) with some cars overturning. Emma tries to warn Aaron Dingle (Danny Miller) and Robert Sugden (Ryan Hawley) but Aaron and Robert drive into a nearby lake with Robert's former stepson Lachlan White (Thomas Atkinson) in the boot in an attempt to avoid the pile up. While this was happening, Emma watched in disbelief, still standing on the bridge. Distraught, Emma flees and begins to pack her things. She answers Finn's phone call and makes herself sounds calm and concerned before finding out that James is still alive and in hospital. Emma later goes to the hospital and tries to kill James by squeezing his breathing tube but backs away, James however later dies.

Within the next few weeks Emma puts on an act of sadness mourning James. Dementia sufferer Ashley tells Emma he remembers seeing her on the bridge before the car accident and she later offers to look after him whilst his wife Laurel Thomas (Charlotte Bellamy) is having a manicure, however she goes to confuse him which leads to Ashley becoming distressed by Emma telling him many different things at once to get rid of the memory of her on the bridge. Later when Laurel comes home she asks Ashley if he recorded anything on his video recorder which he says no too however it is shown that the video recorder is on and that it has recorded Emma telling Ashley he didn't see her on the bridge. In October 2017, Emma's crimes begin to catch up with her and she begins to unravel as Gabby Thomas (Rosie Bentham) learns the truth about her killing James and her lies to Ashley. She confronts Gabby and they fight, leading to Emma being knocked unconscious in the river. She is found by Finn, but she locks him in the church. Later, startled by a noise, Emma accidentally shoots Finn, and he later dies from his injuries. Wracked with guilt for everything she has done, Emma seemingly commits suicide by jumping from a viaduct. As she dies, she is met by the ghosts of James and Finn. Dying, she asks for their forgiveness, which they give her. On the day of her funeral, a flashback reveals that she was actually pushed off the viaduct by Moira following a confrontation between the pair over Holly's death, as well as the murders of James and Finn.

== Darren Thompson ==
Darren Thompson
- Emmerdale character
- Portrayed by: Danny Horn
- First appearance: Episode 7122; 5 March 2015
- Last appearance: Episode 7164; 23 April 2015
In-universe information
- Occupation: Nurse

Darren Thompson, played by Danny Horn, made his first on-screen appearance on 5 March 2015.

Darren is a nurse who attends to Val Pollard (Charlie Hardwick) after she collapses with pneumonia. Darren sees Finn Barton (Joe Gill) acting nervous in the waiting area. Finn has a heart-to-heart with Darren and explains that he feels confused as his mother Emma Barton (Gillian Kearney) has just recently come back into his life and Val was like a mother to him. Darren and Finn grow close and arrange to go for a drink. Victoria Sugden (Isabel Hodgins), who had previously claimed she recognized Darren from somewhere, tells Finn that he was at one of Val's HIV talks. Despite not been bothered about Darren's status, Darren misunderstands things and leaves, though later they clear the air and rearrange. His mum, Emma and his brother Ross Barton (Michael Parr) are both uncomfortable with Finn's relationship. When Darren returns from the toilet, he receives a text warning him to stay away from Finn and Darren accuses Finn. Finn denies this, but Darren leaves. After seeing how unhappy Finn is, Victoria later rings Darren and gets him to visit and apologise to Finn. As Finn goes to get changed for their date, Val vandalizes Darren's car by smashing the windows and spray painting it. She plants Finn's missing phone at the car to make Darren accuse Finn. Darren then drives off abandoning Finn. Finn, not knowing who did it, tells Val that he is going to find out who did it, leaving Val uncomfortable. He accuses his brother Ross and then his mum and throws her out. When Val confesses to her husband, Eric (Chris Chittell) and explains how she did it to protect Finn from been in a relationship with someone HIV positive as it put her and Eric's relationship to the test, Eric makes Val confess to Finn. Finn later forgives Val, however, wanting to put things right, Val calls and meets up with Darren and tells him an obsessive ex of Finn's did it, but then confesses that she did it. Finn and Darren then get back together. To impress Darren, Finn pretends that he's a vegetarian and that he shares the same interests as Darren. However, Finn finds that Darren is too overbearing and doesn't get any time to himself. He won't dare dump him as he worries about Darren getting upset. When he misunderstands and believes that Darren is about to propose, with advice from Val, he acts dirty and disgusting to try and 'scare' him off. However, later on in the pub, Darren says he's being trying to dump him and that he finds him annoying, despite Finn explaining his rudeness. Darren then leaves and Finn is upset that someone found him annoying.

== Donny Cairn ==
Donny Cairn
- Emmerdale character
- Portrayed by: Alan Convy
- Duration: 2015, 2019
- First appearance: Episode 7156; 14 April 2015
- Last appearance: Episode 8365; 11 January 2019
In-universe information
- Sons: Lachlan White

Donny Cairn, played by Alan Convy, made his first screen appearance on 14 April 2015. The character and casting was announced on 24 March 2015. Donny is the father of Lachlan White (Thomas Atkinson), and arrives in the village after his son admits to sexual assaulting Alicia Gallagher (Natalie Anderson). Donny's ex-partner, Chrissie Sugden (Louise Marwood), has tried to keep him out of the situation and Daniel Kilkelly of Digital Spy commented "viewers will have to wait and see how Donny's appearance affects the White family."

Donny first arrives after Chrissie contacts him about Lachlan's sexual assault. When Donny talks to Lachlan, he suggests that he could live with him. He judges Chrissie's parenting and tells her that Lachlan will stay with him instead. Chrissie becomes upset and finds out that Donny involved himself with loan sharks. While Lachlan packs his bags, Chrissie betrays Donny to the loan sharks. His fate is unknown.

Donny was revealed alive in January 2019, after Lachlan contacts him from a mobile phone in prison, where he is for several murders, including Chrissie. Donny terrorises the Dingles on Lachlan's orders as revenge. Donny secretly harasses Belle Dingle (Eden Taylor-Draper) and her family, ransacking the Dingle homestead and killing their pig, Gloria. Belle fears this is Lachlan acting through somebody else but it is not revealed who Lachan has working for him. Donny later returns to the village, setting fire to The Woolpack which has Belle and the Dingles inside. Vanessa Woodfield (Michelle Hardwick) catches him in the act and in an attempt to stop him, Donny stabs Vanessa and takes off with her car, unknown to him that her young son, Johnny, is in the back. When Donny discovers this, he stops the car and prepares to leave Johnny by the side of the road. However, Vanessa's girlfriend Charity Dingle (Emma Atkins), now aware of the situation is looking for Johnny and Vanessa's car. Charity finds Donny and Johnny and rescues Johnny. After a struggle, Charity fights Donny with a metal pole and contains him until the police arrive.

== Moses Dingle ==
Moses Dingle
- Emmerdale character
- Portrayed by: Arthur Cockroft
- Duration: 2015–present
- First appearance: Episode 7206; 11 June 2015
In-universe information
- Other names: Moses Barton
- Father: Ross Barton
- Mother: Charity Dingle
- Stepfather: Mackenzie Boyd
- Sisters: Leyla Sugden
- Half-brothers: Ryan Stocks; Noah Dingle
- Half-sisters: Debbie Dingle
- Grandfathers: Obadiah Dingle; James Barton
- Grandmothers: Emma Barton
- Uncles: Pete Barton; Finn Barton; Adam Barton
- Nephews: Oscar Grisham; Jack Sugden
- Nieces: Sarah Sugden
- Other relatives: Zak Dingle; Cain Dingle; Marlon Dingle; Chas Dingle; Aaron Dingle; Holly Barton; Matty Barton; Nate Robinson; Eve Dingle; John Barton

Moses Dingle (previously Barton), played by Arthur Cockroft, made his first appearance on 11 June 2015. Moses is Charity Dingle (Emma Atkins) and Ross Barton's (Michael Parr) son. She hopes that having a child will result in her prison sentence being reduced, but when things do not turn out as she hoped, she hands him over to her daughter Debbie Dingle (Charley Webb). Chas Dingle (Lucy Pargeter) believes that her brother and Charity's ex-lover, Cain Dingle (Jeff Hordley), is the baby's father, while other villagers suspect Declan Macey (Jason Merrells) and Jai Sharma (Chris Bisson). The Dingles name the baby Moses. Moses is admitted to hospital with a blockage in his stomach and needs to undergo surgery. Debbie pleads with Charity to call Moses' father to let him know his son is ill so Charity calls Ross.

Initially reluctant to be a father, Ross grew to love Moses and ended up becoming his primary carer after Debbie left the village. Ross' mother Emma Barton (Gillian Kearney) became extremely attached to Moses because of abandoning her own boys at a young age and thought of him as her second chance at motherhood. His uncle Finn Barton is later shot and killed by Emma, who also killed his grandfather James Barton. His father later leaves him in the custody of Charity and her girlfriend Vanessa Woodfield.

== Jermaine Bailey ==
Jermaine Bailey
- Emmerdale character
- Portrayed by: Micah Balfour
- Duration: 2015–2016
- First appearance: Episode 7211; 17 June 2015
- Last appearance: Episode 7688; 7 December 2016
In-universe information
- Occupation: Doctor; Trainee barman
- Father: John Bailey
- Mother: Caroline Bailey
- Wife: Angie Bailey (2008–?)

Dr. Jermaine Bailey, played by Micah Balfour, made his first screen appearance on 17 June 2015. Jermaine is a local doctor, who was initially set up on a date with Emma Barton (Gillian Kearney). In March 2016, it was announced that Jermaine would become a love interest for Belle Dingle (Eden Taylor-Draper), after he treats her for a minor injury.

Jermaine works at the local surgery. Finn Barton (Joe Gill) organises a date for Jermaine with his mother Emma. Emma fakes a romantic interest in Jermaine to make her ex-husband James Barton (Bill Ward) jealous. A few weeks later, Jai Sharma (Chris Bisson) calls Jermaine out to give Archie Breckle (Adam) a check-up. Jermaine later confides in James that he has no interest in Emma and does not like her constant phone calls. They continue to work together at the surgery. Jermaine discusses Sarah Sugden's (Sophia-Amber Moore) abnormal test results with her mother Debbie Dingle (Charley Webb). When David Metcalfe (Matthew Wolfenden) brings his father to the surgery, Jermaine offers to give him a check-up as well. He finds a lump on David's testicle and tells him that he is at risk of testicular cancer.

A few days later, Jermaine encounters Belle Dingle just as she cuts her hand on some glass. He treats her and later asks her out on a date, assuming that she is a university student. After having an allergic reaction to some perfume, Belle visits the surgery, but overhears Jermaine asking if his wife has called. Jermaine and Belle kiss, but Belle is determined not to get involved with a married man, as she does not want to be like her father, Zak Dingle (Steve Halliwell). However, Belle and Jermaine continue to see each other. Belle tries to put Jermaine off from coming to her house, and arranges for them to spend time at the Sharma & Sharma factory. As they are about to have sex, they are caught by Rakesh Kotecha (Pasha Bocarie). One of the candles Belle lit sets the office alight after Belle knocks it into the bin.

== Johnny Woodfield ==
Johnny Woodfield
- Emmerdale character
- Portrayed by: Luca Hepworth (2015–2020); Jack Jennings (2022–present)
- Duration: 2015–2020, 2022, 2024–present
- First appearance: Episode 7289; 11 September 2015
In-universe information
- Father: Kirin Kotecha; Adam Barton (legal) (void)
- Mother: Vanessa Woodfield
- Adoptive mother: Charity Dingle (void)
- Half-brothers: Ryan Stocks (adoptive); Noah Dingle (adoptive)
- Half-sisters: Debbie Dingle (adoptive); Leyla Sugden (adoptive)
- Grandfathers: Frank Clayton; Rakesh Kotecha; Obadiah Dingle (adoptive)
- Aunts: Tracy Robinson
- Nephews: Jack Sugden (adoptive); Oscar Grisham (adoptive)
- Nieces: Sarah Sugden (adoptive)
- First cousins: Frankie Robinson

Johnny Woodfield, originally played by Luca Hepworth, currently played by Jack Jennings is the biological son of Vanessa Woodfield (Michelle Hardwick) and Kirin Kotecha (Adam Fielding), who was born fourteen weeks premature.

Johnny's paternity was initially a mystery as Vanessa discovered she was pregnant not long after had a one-night stand with Adam Barton (Adam Thomas), whilst they were on a break from their respective partners, Kirin and Victoria Sugden (Isabel Hodgins). As a result, Vanessa wasn't sure whether her baby's father was Kirin or Adam. When Johnny was born, the DNA test results showed that Adam was the father, however it turned out that Kirin's father Rakesh Kotecha (Pasha Boucharie) had manipulated them, meaning Kirin was the father after all. For the first few months of Johnny's life, Adam raised him as his son.

In 2020, when Vanessa had cancer, Charity Dingle (Emma Atkins), her then partner legally adopted Johnny after Kirin (now played by Rish Shah) handed over his parental rights to Charity. In October 2020, Johnny left Emmerdale with Vanessa after she discovered that Charity had cheated on her with Mackenzie Boyd (Lawrence Robb). He returned in January 2022 when Vanessa returns permanently, however departs again when Vanessa takes a job in Canada.

== Tess Harris ==
Tess Harris
- Emmerdale character
- Portrayed by: Nicola Stephenson
- Duration: 2015–2016
- First appearance: Episode 7301; 25 September 2015
- Last appearance: Episode 7423; 11 February 2016
In-universe information
- Occupation: Teaching assistant
- Husband: Pierce Harris (until 2016)

Tess Harris, played by Nicola Stephenson, made her first screen appearance on 25 September 2015. The character and Stephenson's casting was announced on 20 August 2015. Of joining the show, the actress said "I'm thrilled to be joining the cast of Emmerdale. It's a British institution and I'm very excited about the storylines that they have planned for my character." Tess is a teaching assistant and was billed as "a good-natured and warm character". She will be involved in a storyline with established character Paddy Kirk (Dominic Brunt). On 11 February 2016, Tess made a previously unannounced departure when she was killed following injuries sustained when she was hit in a drink-driving accident. Stephenson denied she was sad to see the end of her character, but admitted she would miss working Brunt and Henry, naming them "fine, dedicated, generous actors". Stephenson described the crash as "easy" for her to film and called the stuntwoman "fearless" and "awesome". Of her experience on the show, Stephenson said she "loved it" and described it as a "lovely experience", "It's been an absolute joy to come in and get such a juicy storyline straight away. The writers have created a fantastic story with great twists and turns that have kept the audience hooked in all the way along. I've been really lucky."

Tess and her friend Chloe go out for the evening. Tess meets Paddy and he tells her about his recent problems with Aaron Livesy (Danny Miller) and they have sex in her car. Paddy begins to show remorse for what he did and decides not to contact her again. She appears as the teaching assistant of Paddy's stepson Leo Goskirk and befriends Rhona Goskirk (Zoë Henry). This annoys Paddy and they try to avoid each other. Tess then decides to leave her job at Leo's school, but after Leo throws a tantrum, Paddy tells Tess to return and forget about what happened between them.

Tess returns to her job as a teaching assistant and she starts her friendship with Paddy again. She has a heart-to-heart with Paddy that her husband, Pierce, never has the time for her due to his job and has no feelings for him anymore. She buys a pregnancy test and it turns out to be negative. She reveals that she wanted to have children, whilst Pierce didn't, causing their marriage to deteriorate. Paddy and Tess then have sex again and agree to start an affair. An unaware Rhona asks Tess to be one of their references as they want to adopt a child. When the social worker tells Rhona and Paddy that she has heard some worrying feedback, he accuses Tess, but she denies it angrily and Paddy later learns that Aaron was responsible. In revenge, Tess starts flirting with his best friend Marlon Dingle (Mark Charnock), but he does not take it seriously. She later admits that she is a married woman and decides to call off the relationship with Marlon.

Tess starts to become connected to Paddy again and invites him for a hotel break. At the hotel, Paddy rejects Tess and admits that he would not continue the affair due to his love for Rhona. Paddy then meets Rhona at the hotel and Tess almost exposes their affair. Tess later tells Paddy that she would expose their affair and announces to him that she would leave Pierce to start a new life with him. Tess and Paddy argue again, and Tess decides to tell Rhona and after phoning her to meet her, she walks across the road, but is struck by Kirin Kotecha's (Adam Fielding) car at speed and is left for dead. However, Megan Macey (Gaynor Faye) stops her car and notices Tess in the middle of the road. Paddy and Rhona arrive and Paddy stays with her, while Rhona helps a shocked Megan. Tess then regains consciousness and tells Paddy she loves him. He tells her he loves her too. Shortly after, the ambulance arrives and Tess is admitted to hospital. Her husband Pierce Harris (Jonathan Wrather) turns up, and is told that she died during surgery.

== Tanya ==
Tanya
- Emmerdale character
- Portrayed by: Hilary Connell
- First appearance: Episode 7341; 10 November 2015
- Last appearance: Episode 7346; 17 November 2015
In-universe information
- Occupation: Businesswoman
- Sisters: Alex

Tanya, played by Hilary Connell, made her first screen appearance on 10 November 2015. Connell's casting was announced on 3 November, while Tanya had previously been mentioned on-screen by other characters. She is the first Canadian character to appear on Emmerdale.

Tanya is the girlfriend of Nikhil Sharma (Rik Makarem). She flies over to England after Nikhil decides to stay in Emmerdale village to look after his family's failing business. Upon her arrival, Tanya meets Brenda Walker (Lesley Dunlop), the mother of Nikhil's deceased wife Gennie (Sian Reese-Williams), and is persuaded to attend Gennie's memorial birthday party. At the memorial, Tanya tells Nikhil's brother Jai (Chris Bisson) that she needs to go back to Holdgate Farm and check up on her business. However, Jai tells Nikhil that Tanya left because she felt pressured and out of place with the celebration.

A few days later, Tanya joins Jai for a drink at The Woolpack. He spikes her drink then takes her to The Grange B&B, where he undresses her and puts her to bed. He takes photos of Tanya and tries to convince her they had sex. He then blackmails her into taking Nikhil back to Canada and she slaps him. Tanya tells Nikhil that she is returning to Canada, as she cannot bare to be around Jai. Nikhil agrees and tells Tanya that his sister-in-law Megan Macey (Gaynor Faye) is pregnant with Jai's baby and intends to tell him. Tanya says Jai does not deserve to know and then tells Nikhil about Jai's blackmail scheme. Nikhil becomes disgusted with both Tanya and Jai. She returns to Canada, leaving Nikhil behind in Emmerdale. Tanya and Nikhil managed to preserve their relationship. However, they later break up, after Jai sends Tanya a photo of Nikhil with Megan suggesting that they were having an affair.

== Mrs Winterbottom ==
Mrs Winterbottom
- Emmerdale character
- Portrayed by: Liz Dawn
- Appears in: Episode 7381/7382; 25 December 2015

Mrs Winterbottom, played by Liz Dawn, made a guest appearance on 25 December 2015. The character and Dawn's casting was announced on 11 November 2015. Dawn came out of retirement to make a one-off guest appearance as Mrs Winterbottom. Filming took place the same week. Mrs Winterbottom is "a decidedly demanding guest", who is staying at Eric Pollard's (Chris Chittell) B&B. Describing Mrs Winterbottom, Dawn said "I love my character. What a feisty lady she is! Giving them all a run for their money in the B&B on Christmas Day. She's so rude to them, which isn't like me at all."

== Other characters ==
Date(s)	Character	Actor	Circumstances
26 March	Sunil Malla	Alton Letto	Sunil is Carly Hope's (Gemma Atkinson) ex-fiancé, who she jilted. Sunil comes to the café and demands money from Carly for the wedding. When he insults her, her father Bob Hope (Tony Audenshaw) punches him and then offers to give him the money. Ross Barton (Michael Parr) steals Sunil's car, so he calls the police. But he is branded a time waster when he spots the car across the street.
26 June	Clive	David Bowen	Clive is a vicar, who fills in for an injured Ashley Thomas (John Middleton). He performs Moses Dingle's christening.
13 July	Novak Ketov	Marko Leht	Novak is an illegal immigrant that Tracy Shankley (Amy Walsh) hires to drive trucks for Home James Haulage. While he is on his way to France with some televisions, Novak is attacked by Ross Barton (Michael Parr) and the televisions are stolen.
20 July	Alberto	John Moraitis	Alberto was Hilary Potts's (Paula Wilcox) fiancé. Following her death, Alberto tells everyone that Hilary was the love of his life. Hilary's ex-husband Douglas Potts (Duncan Preston) is annoyed by this, as Alberto had only known Hilary for a few months.
3 August	Alby	Robin Askwith	Alby is a friend of Rodney Blackstock (Patrick Mower), who runs a fairground. He arrives in the village shortly before Debbie Dingle (Charley Webb) and Pete Barton's (Anthony Quinlan) wedding. Pete then hires Alby's fair for the day and it is set up next to the village hall.
3 August	Gerald	Simon Wright	Gerald is called to check over Lawrence White (John Bowe) after he becomes light headed and falls over. Gerald takes a look at Lawrence's heart medication and reveals that it has been tampered with. He tells Lawrence to go to the hospital for a proper check-up.
17 August	Julia	Soraya Radford	Julia is a builder, who matches with Marlon Dingle (Mark Charnock) on a dating app. When Marlon tries to pull out of the date, he sends Paddy Kirk (Dominic Brunt) to the cafe to tell Julia. However, Marlon also turns up at the cafe and meets her. Laurel Thomas (Charlotte Bellamy) then introduces herself to Julia as Marlon's wife, causing her to leave.
1–3 September	Connor Jensen	Rob Mallard	A rent-boy hired by Robert Sugden (Ryan Hawley) to seduce Lawrence White (John Bowe).
28 September–22 October	DC Henry	Sushil Chudasama	The detectives leading the inquiry regarding the shooting of Robert Sugden (Ryan Hawley).
28 September–22 October	DS Hart	Kate Coogan	The detectives leading the inquiry regarding the shooting of Robert Sugden (Ryan Hawley).
