= 20th National Television Awards =

British awards ceremony in 2015

- Date: 21 January 2015
- Location: The O2 Arena, London
- Country: United Kingdom
- Presented by: Dermot O'Leary
- Website: http://www.nationaltvawards.com/

Television/radio coverage
- Network: ITV
- Runtime: 150 mins (inc. adverts)

The 20th National Television Awards were held at The O2 Arena on 21 January 2015. The event was presented by Dermot O'Leary, who himself was again nominated for an award. The ceremony was broadcast live on ITV.

During the show there was a tribute to Coronation Street actress Anne Kirkbride (Deirdre Barlow) who died on the evening of 19 January 2015, read by on-screen husband and close friend William Roache (Ken Barlow). The end was met with a moment's reflection, leading onto an interval by broadcaster ITV.

== Performances ==
- Ben Haenow – "Something I Need"
- Pixie Lott and The Proclaimers – "I'm Gonna Be (500 Miles)"

== Viewers ==
The show attracted an average of 6.30 million viewers on the night, up by around 400k viewers from the previous edition and the highest rating since the 2011 viewership of 6.50 million.

== Awards ==
Category Presenter(s)	Winner	Nominated
"Factual Programme"; Presented by Michael Buerk	Gogglebox (Channel 4)	Paul O'Grady: For the Love of Dogs (ITV); Long Lost Family (ITV); Top Gear (BBC Two)
"Entertainment Programme"; Presented by Claudia Winkleman and Tess Daly	I'm a Celebrity...Get Me Out of Here! (ITV)	Ant & Dec's Saturday Night Takeaway (ITV); Celebrity Big Brother (Channel 5); Through the Keyhole (ITV)
"Newcomer"; Presented by Emma Willis	Maddy Hill (Nancy Carter, EastEnders - BBC One)	Lee Mead (Ben "Lofty" Chiltern, Casualty - BBC One); Michael Parr (Ross Barton, Emmerdale - ITV); Cameron Moore (Cameron Campbell, Hollyoaks - Channel 4)
"Drama Performance"; Presented by Olivia Colman and David Tennant	Sheridan Smith (Cilla Black, Cilla - ITV)	Dame Maggie Smith (Violet Crawley, Downton Abbey - ITV); Benedict Cumberbatch (Sherlock Holmes, Sherlock - BBC One); Sarah Lancashire (Catherine Cawood, Happy Valley - BBC One)
"Daytime Programme"; Presented by Adam Hills	This Morning (ITV)	The Jeremy Kyle Show (ITV); Pointless (BBC One); The Chase (ITV)
"Comedy"; Presented by Sir David Jason	Mrs. Brown's Boys (BBC One/RTÉ One)	Outnumbered (BBC One); Benidorm (ITV); The Big Bang Theory (E4/CBS)
"Serial Drama Performance"; Presented by Natalie Gumede	Danny Dyer (Mick Carter, EastEnders - BBC One)	Kellie Bright (Linda Carter, EastEnders - BBC One); Verity Rushworth (Donna Windsor, Emmerdale - ITV); Nikki Sanderson (Maxine Minniver, Hollyoaks - Channel 4)
"Entertainment Presenter"; Presented by Graham Norton	Ant & Dec	Keith Lemon; Bradley Walsh; Dermot O'Leary
"Drama"; Presented by Julie Walters	Downton Abbey (ITV)	Cilla (ITV); Sherlock (BBC One); Doctor Who (BBC One)
"Serial Drama"; Presented by Lorraine Kelly	EastEnders (BBC One)	Hollyoaks (Channel 4); Coronation Street (ITV); Emmerdale (ITV)
"Talent Show"; Presented by Thierry Henry	The X Factor (ITV)	Britain's Got Talent (ITV); Strictly Come Dancing (BBC One); The Voice UK (BBC One)
"Skills Challenge Show"; Presented by Matilda Ramsay	The Great British Bake Off (BBC One)	MasterChef (BBC One); Come Dine with Me (Channel 4); The Apprentice (BBC One)
"TV Judge"; Presented by The Tapper Family (Gogglebox)	David Walliams (collected by Simon Cowell)	Simon Cowell; Mary Berry; Cheryl Fernandez-Versini
"Chat Show Host"; Presented by Mel B	Alan Carr	Michael McIntyre; Paul O'Grady; Jonathan Ross; Graham Norton
"Multichannel"; Presented by Kris Jenner	Celebrity Juice (ITV2)	The Walking Dead (Fox/AMC); Geordie Shore (MTV); Game of Thrones (Sky Atlantic/HBO)
"Landmark Award"; Presented by Davina McCall	Comic Relief	
"Special Recognition"; Presented by The Proclaimers	David Tennant	
