= Moira Dingle =

Fictional character from Emmerdale

- Emmerdale character
- Portrayed by: Natalie J. Robb
- Duration: 2009–present
- First appearance: Episode 5350; 17 July 2009
- Introduced by: Steve Frost
- Spin-off appearances: Paddy and Marlon's Big Night In (2011)
- Crossover appearances: Corriedale (2026)
In-universe information
- Other names: Moira Barton
- Occupation: Barmaid; Farmer
- Mother: Ann Boyd
- Brothers: Mackenzie Boyd
- Husband: John Barton (until 2012); Cain Dingle (2014–present)
- Sons: Adam Barton; Matty Barton; Isaac Dingle
- Daughters: Holly Barton
- Adoptive sons: Kyle Dingle
- Stepsons: Nate Robinson
- Stepdaughters: Debbie Dingle
- Nephews: Reuben Harris

Moira Dingle (also Barton) is a fictional character from the British ITV soap opera Emmerdale, played by Natalie J. Robb. The actress successfully auditioned for the role after a call came through her agent. Robb's character and her family were created and introduced to Emmerdale as part of an overhaul of the show by the series producer Gavin Blyth. The Barton family took over the running of Butler's Farm and they were described as being "sexy, modern and contemporary". Robb first appeared as Moira during the episode broadcast on 17 July 2009.

Moira is portrayed as being strong, feisty, vivacious and independent. She is a farmer's wife and very protective of her family, who she always puts first. Robb said being part of a modern-day farming family is what drew her to the role of Moira. Moira's early storylines often revolved around her marriage and her three children. She and her husband John (James Thornton) were childhood sweethearts. Moira managed to balance work and family because she had John's support. Moira's later storylines focused on an affair with Cain Dingle (Jeff Hordley), whom she later married after John's death and a casual relationship with farmhand Alex Moss (Kurtis Stacey); the revelation that she had had an affair with John's brother, James (Bill Ward), who was the biological father of her son Adam (Adam Thomas); murdering Emma Barton (Gillian Kearney); an affair with her farmhand Nate Robinson (Jurell Carter), who turned out to be Cain's long-lost son; and being diagnosed with a meningioma brain tumour. For her portrayal of Moira, Robb was nominated for Best Newcomer at the 2010 Inside Soap Awards.

== Creation and casting ==
In May 2009, it was announced that Emmerdale's new series producer, Gavin Blyth, would be introducing a new farming family called the Bartons, as part of an ongoing overhaul of the show. The family, which consists of five members – a mother, father, two daughters and a son – took over the running of Butler's Farm. Of the family, Blyth said "I don't want to make Emmerdale a show about teenagers and young people, it's about family values. The Bartons are sexy, modern and contemporary. They're almost happy – and in soapland that's quite strange!" James Thornton was cast in the role of John Barton and Adam Thomas, Sophie Powles and Grace Cassidy were cast as Adam, Holly and Hannah respectively.

Former The Bill actress Natalie J. Robb was cast in the role of John's wife, Moira. Robb said a call went through her agent asking her to audition for the role of Moira. She auditioned with several different actors, including Thornton. Robb's agent later called to tell her she had won the role. Robb explained finding out she had won the part was one of the best bits of the job. The actress said she was looking forward to joining because the Emmerdale team, which she described as "genuine and lovely." She added "Cast and crew have been very welcoming and that always helps. There’s nothing better than being able to really look forward to going into work."

== Development ==
=== Characterisation ===
"Moira is strong and feisty but always fair, with a huge heart and great compassion. She won’t take any nonsense from anyone, but has a great sense of fun and a vivacious nature. Although she has her own sense of pride, she’s more able to back down and eat humble pie than her husband, John. She's the glue that keeps her family strongly bonded together."

— itv.com on Moira

Upon announcement of her casting, Moira was described as being a vivacious, fun woman, who puts her family first. Though she values her independence too. The Yorkshire Post described Moira as "Fun-loving and feisty" and said she is guaranteed to cause a stir with the locals. Of Moira, What's on TV said she is a "farmer's wife and looking good on it, Moira Barton is a very down-to-earth woman – and that just adds to her appeal!" Robb said the idea of a modern-day farming family drew her to the role of Moira. She explained the family being a freshness to the Butler's Farm, saying "The Barton’s are very lively and young-spirited and that really appealed to me. There are families out there that do work together and aren’t dysfunctional so the chance to represent one of those groups really drew me to the role." Robb said her character is independent, fun-loving and strong. She loves her family and is very protective of them. Moira keeps them going and coordinates their lives.

During an interview with Inside Soap Robb said she would probably not make a good farmer's wife, unlike Moira. Robb said she is strong and loves animals, but could not send them to slaughter. Moira finds employment as a barmaid at The Woolpack and Robb said she was looking forward to getting behind the bar and pulling a few pints. The Yorkshire Post said her most volatile relationship will be with The Woolpack's chef Marlon Dingle (Mark Charnock). Robb told the paper, "Moira generally gets on with everybody. However, you'll see her and Marlon develop a love-hate relationship, which will be interesting." Robb later thought Moira would warm to Marlon, in between their battles.

=== Marriage to John Barton ===
In her fictional backstory, Moira married John Barton in 1990. They were childhood sweethearts. Robb said it was love at first sight for both Moira and John and they have a "great chemistry" together. The actress added "Moira really finds him attractive, fancies him a lot and loves him deeply. They have a lot of affection for each other." Thornton said John and Moira had a lot of fun in their youth and there have often been hints about their party lifestyle. When Marlon falls in love with Moira, she tells him she has not looked at another man during her twenty years of marriage to John. Robb thought Moira told Marlon that because she did not want to hurt him or cheat on John. Moira manages to maintain a good work and family balance because she has John's support. Together they make a strong team and do not take themselves seriously. John encourages Moira to have her independence, but to share her experiences with the family. Thornton told Kris Green of Digital Spy that John and Moira are enough for each other. John knows Moira is the boss of the house and he respects that. He added that while no one knows much about the Bartons' backstory, they do know John and Moira have a solid marriage.

John kisses Eve Jenson (Suzanne Shaw) and Thornton said it is because he is flattered by her interest in him. Robb explained John is Moira's soulmate and even though she knows he looks at other woman, she did not think he would ever act upon it. Robb added "Moira sensed it before it happened, which made it worse!" When asked what kind of man it would take for Moira to cheat on John, Robb opined the man would have similar values to John and she thought Marlon would be a safe bet as he is loyal and trustworthy. Thornton said he is worried the writers are going to split John and Moira up and Robb said if the characters were to split, they would find it hard to live without each other.

=== Affair with Cain Dingle ===
"Moira just can't help herself. So she does it. The sex is amazing – the chemistry is so powerful it's electric and she can't control it."

— Robb on Moira's attraction to Cain (2011)

In October 2011, Moira begins an affair with Cain Dingle (Jeff Hordley). Cain has been interested in Moira for a while as he knows how much she loathes him. Moira decides to purchase a Land Rover from Cain and agrees to pay him the money in weekly instalments. Moira asks Cain to keep the arrangement from John, as their marriage is under a lot of strain and is quite fragile at that moment. Hordley told Laura Morgan of All About Soap that Cain sees the deal as his chance to have a bit of fun with Moira. He explained "Cain enjoys causing friction between her and John – he just doesn't care about offending anyone. Cain keeps toying with Moira, and he knows that she secretly wants him..." When asked if Cain and Moira could be heading towards a full-blown affair, Hordley said he did not think so as Cain is still in love with Charity Tate (Emma Atkins). The actor added Cain is just playing with Moira like a cat plays with a mouse.

On 23 October, Nada Farhoud of The People reported the attraction between Moira and Cain was going to "explode into Emmerdale's steamiest ever fling." The affair starts after Cain tells John about his and Moira's arrangement. Moira goes to the garage to tell Cain off and they have a huge fight. Suddenly Moira kisses Cain and they have sex. Of the scene, Robb said "The director asked me to wear a crossover dress so my breasts look very voluptuous, perfect for a seduction scene. We ripped each other's tops off, he cleared everything off his fridge, picked me up and my legs were wrapped around him. We looked at each other and then went into a clinch." The actress told Kate White of Inside Soap that her character does not like Cain, but that is part of the attraction for her. She cannot explain why she has a thing for him, but she cannot help herself. Moira is left feeling dirty and guilty after the encounter. However, she cannot help giving into temptation again and Robb revealed Moira does not want to go back to Cain and she tries to fight it when she does. Robb opined the relationship is quite abusive but Cain brings out a different side to Moira. Farhoud said Moira and Cain end up having sex in a barn and on a bed. The writer said the scenes are "so hot" the soap's film crew became embarrassed during filming.

Of why her character puts her marriage in jeopardy, Robb explained "She still loves John, but she feels isolated and neglected because he's stopped including her in the finances of the new business. He's changed the dynamic of their relationship." Robb also said the way Cain treats Moira makes her realise what she has with John. Cain later decides to tell John what has been going on between him and Moira and Robb said it is not going to be a good Christmas for the family. On 17 November 2011, it was announced a major storyline would see Cain attacked by a mystery person and left for dead. Moira was named as one of six official suspects, along with John. Digital Spy conducted a poll on their website asking viewers to select which suspect they thought had carried out the attack. Moira received 16.3% of the vote, placing her fourth behind John, Amy Wyatt (Chelsea Halfpenny) and Zak Dingle (Steve Halliwell).

Following John's death, Moira and Cain begin a relationship, which culminates in their marriage. Moira proposes to Cain, who accepts following some initial doubts about her motives. Robb said that the couple's marriage "will be far from dull – those two aren't even dull when they're happy." She also said the wedding ceremony would be simple and not traditional, as that is what Moira had with John. In the lead up to the wedding, Moira's brother-in-law James Barton (Bill Ward) threatens to reveal that Adam is actually his biological son, having carried out a secret DNA test.

=== Alex Moss ===
Moira began a brief fling with her 21-year-old farmhand, Alex Moss (Kurtis Stacey), in July 2012. When Moira becomes aware of her feelings for Alex, she initially urges him to get back together with his ex-girlfriend, Victoria Sugden (Isabel Hodgins). Moss thought that Moira was just trying to block her attraction to Alex out. One night when Alex and Moira are having a drink together, he kisses her and she responds. However, Moira then pulls away and laughs, leaving Alex embarrassed. Moira and Alex later begin an affair and Robb believed that her character saw the situation as "a bit of fun", while Stacey thought that Alex's feelings are serious. The actress said that Alex brought out Moira's "sexy side" and was not entirely unsuitable as a long-term love interest. Robb commented "He's always been familiar to her, he's been on the farm, he knows Adam, he knew John. So he sort of fits in and that's a comfort to her."

== Storylines ==
Moira and her family move to Emmerdale to take over the running of Butler's Farm. Moira defends her husband, John, when he faces prison for locking Aaron Livesy (Danny Miller) in a barn. She also becomes concerned when her youngest child (then called Hannah) shows an interest in Andy Sugden (Kelvin Fletcher), who is recovering from a breakdown. When Moira spots Hannah running away from Andy's caravan in tears, she jumps to conclusions that he took advantage of Hannah and fires him. She later apologises to Andy. Moira begins working as a barmaid in The Woolpack and she frequently clashes with the chef, Marlon Dingle. She later learns that Marlon has feelings for her and she lets him down gently. Moira becomes good friends with Diane Sugden (Elizabeth Estensen), but their friendship is tested when Hannah reveals that she has been bullied by Victoria Sugden (Isabel Hodgins) and her friend, Kayleigh Gibbs (Lily Jane Stead). Eve Jenson (Suzanne Shaw) starts working at the farm and begins flirting with John. Moira notices and warns Eve off when she believes she is getting too familiar with John. Cain Dingle (Jeff Hordley) later tells Moira that he saw John and Eve kissing and she confronts John. He explains that what Cain said was true, but the kiss did not mean anything. Moira asks him to leave, but they eventually reconcile.

Holly develops an addiction to drugs, which puts a strain on the whole family. She runs away and later steals from the house. Moira and John try keeping Holly locked up in her room to make her go cold turkey. However, Moira cannot bear to see her suffer and she buys some heroin for her daughter. She is then caught and cautioned by the police. Moira finds out that her son, Adam, is having an affair with Ella Hart (Corrinne Wicks) and she demands that he ends it. Moira warns Ella to back off, but Ella's husband, Declan Macey (Jason Merrells), then finds out about the affair. Moira makes Adam tell John about the affair. John becomes angry because it could affect a deal he has with Declan about the farm. John and Moira's relationship becomes strained once more, especially when Cain reveals that Moira is paying him in instalments for a Land Rover. Angered by this, Moira goes to the garage to confront Cain. Despite the two arguing, they end up having sex which leads to them beginning an affair. Moira confides in Diane about the affair, but does not initially say who she is seeing. Cain tells John about the affair and when he throws Moira out, she goes to stay with her mother.

On her return, Moira moves in with Marlon and tries to help out her family. John allows her to come to the farm to help with the finances for the business. Adam, Hannah and Holly eventually forgive her and try to help her reconcile with John. However, Moira is devastated when John starts flirting with Chas Dingle (Lucy Pargeter). Moira tells John that she will agree to a divorce if that is what he wants, but John tells her it is not. Moira and John reconcile and their children book a night at a hotel for them. While driving, John loses control of the car as he hits some black ice and the car falls down a hill. Moira manages to free herself from the car with help from John and Declan. However, Moira cannot free John and the vehicle falls over a cliff. John is rescued and rushed to hospital, where he undergoes surgery. Shortly after Moira tells John that she loves him, he dies. Moira is devastated by John's death and the children try to help her around the farm. Hannah struggles with her studies, while Holly blames Moira for John's death. After turning to drugs again, Holly begins seeing a counsellor and is later offered a job in London. Hannah announces that she is bored of village life and wants to go with her. Moira initially refuses to let her go, but later relents.

Alex comes to stay at the farm, after his house floods. Moira and Alex begin an affair and try to conceal it from Adam. After confronting Alex, Victoria learns that he was seeing Moira and reveals the affair to the rest of the village. Moira and Cain begin a relationship. Moira's former brother-in-law, James (Bill Ward) and his three sons, Ross (Michael Parr), Pete (Anthony Quinlan) and Finn (Joe Gill), move to the village. It emerges that Moira and James had a brief affair many years previously and James admits that he still has feelings for Moira. Moira feels uncomfortable around James, but they work together to win a deal with a supermarket. James agrees to go back to his farm after apologising to Cain for making a pass at Moira. Moira proposes to Cain and he accepts. James does a DNA test and learns that Adam is his son, not John's. He threatens to reveal the truth, but decides not to. Adam tells Moira that he has worked out that she and James had an affair. Moira almost tells him that James is his father, but changes her mind. Cain and Moira marry in front of their friends and family on the farm. Moira is stunned when Pete, her marital nephew, kisses her. After Cain finds out about the kiss, he threatens Pete. Pete later gets himself arrested.

When Cain's car is stolen, Cain and Moira chase after the mystery driver, who turns out to be Holly. After Holly relapses into drug use, Moira confronts her drug dealer but falls onto a used needle causing her to believe she has contracted HIV. With Moira's help Holly becomes clean, however Cain is disgusted when he finds out Holly caused her to become contracted with HIV after he finds Moira's antiretroviral drugs. Cain leaves Moira and later shares a kiss with Charity at The Woolpack. When Moira finds out about Cain's kiss with Charity, she tires of Cain's actions and files for divorce. Moira is later relieved when she finds out that she is HIV negative, following tests at the clinic. However, relief turns to tragedy as Holly dies suddenly after overdosing. In October 2017, when Moira is out in the barn, Emma Barton confronts her about James and starts a fire. Moira becomes trapped in the fire and goes into labour. Moira tells Emma that the baby is Pete's and Emma rescues her from the burning barn. Emma delivers Moira's baby and then is found by Adam and Victoria. Moira is rushed into hospital and Emma steals her baby. Moira wakes up and goes to the farm and finds the gun but is called to say that her baby has been returned by Emma. Moira later finds out that nephew Finn Barton was shot by Emma. By the time Finn was pronounced dead, Moira confronted Emma on a viaduct and urged her to come back in a bid to tell Pete and Ross the truth. This appears to be successful until Emma begins to lash out and taunt Moira about Holly, resulting in Moira slapping Emma and subsequently pushing her to her death when she says Moira is to blame for Holly's death.

A DNA test later reveals that Cain is the baby's father. Moira names the child Isaac. She initially struggles to cope with caring for him, even attempting to have Adam and Victoria adopt him, but she adjusts. The police suspect Adam was Emma's murderer and arrest him, but he goes on the run with assistance from Cain and Aaron. He leaves a message for Moira saying goodbye as he leaves the country. Ross and Pete learn that Moira was the one who murdered Emma but agree to keep her secret, feeling that enough damage has been done.

Moira and Cain get back together in early 2018. He catches an intruder in the house one day and apprehends him. Moira recognises him as her child previously known as Hannah. Matty had undergone gender transition in the time after he had left the village with Holly and has been living as a man. Moira is hurt and confused to learn about Matty's transition and further dismayed to learn that he only returned to find his birth certificate to have his details legally changed and was not intending to see her at all. She has trouble accepting Matty's gender identity, frequently referring to him as "Hannah" or "her". However, she convinces him to stay after he is mugged at the train station and hospitalised. Though concerned for him, she realises that he knows who he is and slowly comes to accept his identity.

Moira has an affair with farmhand Nate Robinson (Jurell Carter). After Cain learns of the affair, he takes Moira and Nate out on a boat to confront them, where it emerges that Nate is his son. Cain moves out, taking their sons with him and starts divorce proceedings. Moira begins drinking to excess due to loneliness and she is hit by a car driven by Nate's mother Cara Robinson (Carryl Thomas). She temporarily leaves the village to recover. Months later, Moira goes into partnership with Rhona Goskirk (Zoe Henry) and she is targeted by DI Mark Malone (Mark Womack), after finding about his affair with Harriet Finch (Katherine Dow Blyton). She is struck by a car driven by Jamie Tate (Alexander Lincoln), who drives away from the scene. While she is recovering, she learns that Rhona has also gone into partnership with Nate.

In May 2023, Moira plans to sell her farm due to financial difficulties.

== Other appearances ==
Moira appears in the 2011 spin-off DVD Paddy and Marlon's Big Night In. The DVD centers around the characters of Paddy Kirk (Dominic Brunt) and Marlon Dingle who have a "not-so-quiet night in the country, and a morning after anybody would want to forget." The script was written by Paul Roundell and directed by Emmerdale assistant producer Tony Hammond. Filming took place over September and October and the DVD was released on 14 November 2011.

== Reception ==
For her portrayal of Moira, Robb was nominated for Best Newcomer at the 2010 Inside Soap Awards. The following year, Robb was shortlisted for Best Serial Drama Performance at the 16th National Television Awards. In 2012, Robb and Thornton won Spectacular Scene of the Year for John and Moira's car accident at the British Soap Awards. The following year, Cain and Moira's relationship was nominated in the Forbidden Lovers category at the All About Soap Awards. In August 2017, Robb was longlisted for Sexiest Female at the Inside Soap Awards, while Moira discovering Holly dead was longlisted for Best Shock Twist. Both nominations were shortlisted in their respective categories. On 6 November 2017, Robb won the "Sexiest Female" accolade.

During the Moira and Alex storyline, Carena Crawford from All About Soap commented that the sexual tension between them was "sizzling – and we love it!" Crawford thought that Moira's "girly, giggly face" after Alex kissed her meant that she wanted him just as much as he wanted her. She added "And we say, go for it! Why not have some fun after all she's been through? It's time for Mrs Barton to let her hair down – and if a hot young man wants to help her do it, then why not?!"
