= List of Emmerdale characters introduced in 2013 =

Emmerdale is a British soap opera first broadcast on 16 October 1972. The following is a list of characters that first appeared during 2013, by order of first appearance. Ross Barton (Michael Parr) made his debut in July. Joanie Wright (Denise Black) made her first appearance in August. October saw the introduction of Lindy (Nimmy March), the mother of established character Ruby Haswell (Alicya Eyo), and former Coronation Street actor Bill Ward as James Barton. Harriet Finch (Katherine Dow Blyton) and Gil Keane (David Easter) debuted in November, while Pete, played by Hollyoaks star Anthony Quinlan, and Finn Barton (Joe Gill) arrived in December. Additionally, multiple other characters appear throughout the year.

== Beattie Dixon ==
Beattie Dixon
- Emmerdale character
- Portrayed by: Eileen O'Brien
- First appearance: Episode 6440; 3 January 2013
- Last appearance: Episode 6643; 27 August 2013
In-universe information
- Grandsons: Alex Moss

Beattie Dixon, portrayed by Eileen O'Brien is the grandmother of Alex Moss (Kurtis Stacey), who first appears on 3 January 2013 unbeknownst that he was murdered by Cameron Murray (Dominic Power) on Christmas Day 2012. This was O'Brien's second role after playing Belle Dingle (Eden Taylor-Draper)'s teacher Bridget Burgess between 2006 and 2007.

Beattie comes to the village looking for Edna Birch (Shirley Stelfox), after she learns Alex has been accused of stealing from her, before apparently fleeing the village. She vows to find her grandson and clear his name, as she could not believe he would be capable of such a thing. However, is unable to clear his name and is also unable to find him. She returns on 26 August when Alex's body has been found and organises a memorial service for him.

== Neil Gutterson ==
Neil Gutterson
- Emmerdale character
- Portrayed by: Cameron Stewart
- First appearance: Episode 6629; 3 May 2013
- Last appearance: Episode 7735; 16 August 2013
In-universe information
- Occupation: Foreman

Neil Gutterson was a foreman working on construction of Declan Macey's (Jason Merrells) glamping site in the woods. He was played by Cameron Stewart, who had previously appeared in Emmerdale as businessman Larry Jacobs. Neil goes to Declan to inform him that they have found what appears to be human remains. Neil and Declan ultimately agree to turn a blind eye to the discovery in order to keep the building project on schedule, appalling Declan's wife, Katie (Sammy Winward). Declan's sister, Megan Macey (Gaynor Faye) says she has heard that the Dingles once buried an old poacher in the woods.

Subsequently, Katie made an anonymous call to the police regarding the body and it was later investigated and revealed to be the body of Alex Moss (Kurtis Stacey), who had been murdered by Cameron Murray (Dominic Power) on Christmas Day 2012.

== Ross Barton ==
Ross Barton, played by Michael Parr, made his first screen appearance on 9 July 2013. The character and Parr's casting was officially announced on 24 October 2013. Of joining the show, Parr stated "I am thrilled to be playing a regular character in Emmerdale. It was always the plan that Laurel's carjacker would be revealed as Moira's nephew – Ross Barton. It has been fun keeping his identity and my role a secret. Although I did nearly burst from wanting to tell people. Ross is a great character and there is lots to come for him in future episodes." Parr was nominated for "Sexiest Male" and "Best Newcomer" at The British Soap Awards 2014.

== Joanie Wright ==
Joanie Wright
- Emmerdale character
- Portrayed by: Denise Black
- Duration: 2013, 2015–2017
- First appearance: Episode 6629; 12 August 2013
- Last appearance: Episode 7735; 30 January 2017
In-universe information
- Other names: Joanie Dingle
- Occupation: Sweet factory worker
- Husband: Zak Dingle (2016–2017)
- Daughters: Karen Winchester
- Stepdaughters: Belle Dingle
- Grandsons: Kyle Dingle (adoptive)

Joanie Dingle (also Wright and Dingle-Wright) played by Denise Black, made her first screen appearance on 12 August 2013. The character and Black's casting was announced on 20 June 2013. The actress began filming in the same week as her casting announcement. Of joining the show, Black commented "'Joanie's a character I've never played before. My first grandma. Dear lord, that came round quick. She is going to get some very tasty stories, so I'm really looking forward to it. I already know quite a few of the cast and I met Lesley Dunlop (Brenda Walker) on my first day, who said 'you'll love it here, it's a lovely job'. The casting came through on my birthday so there we go, what a present. I can't believe my luck." Series producer Kate Oates added that Joanie's story would see her play against some of the show's best-loved characters and called Black "a fabulous asset to the show.". On 7 November 2013, it was announced that Black had filmed her final scenes and departed on 14 November 2013 at the end of her current storyline. On 6 May 2015, it was announced that Black had reprised her role and would return on 17 June 2015. Of her return, Black said "I am very excited to be coming back to Emmerdale. It's a lovely show to work on and I'm well set for Joanie's revival. I bet she has learned a thing or two since we last saw her. Is she still a single grandma? Has she changed? How is Kyle? I can't wait to find out." On 30 January 2017, Joanie was killed off in a previously unannounced departure. Laura-Jayne Tyler from Inside Soap called the character a "homewrecker".

Joanie is the adoptive grandmother of Kyle Wyatt (Huey Quinn), the son of Amy Wyatt (Chelsea Halfpenny) and Cain Dingle (Jeff Hordley). When Kyle reappears, viewers learn that he is now living with his "caring and loving grannie Joanie". Black called her character "feisty" and said that enjoys playing poker and drinking pints. Black also revealed that she had let her hair grow out grey for the part, causing people to give up their seats for her on the Tube. Ahead of her return in June 2015, Black explained that Joanie's life had taken a turn for the worse since she was last in the village. Struggling with her new situation, Joanie will seek out Kyle's father, Cain, and ask for financial support.

Joanie is the mother of Karen Winchester, who dies of carbon monoxide poisoning along with her husband, Tom. She attends their funeral and wake with her grandson, Kyle Wyatt. Joanie meets Amy and her friend, Victoria Sugden (Isabel Hodgins). Needing to see her son, Amy goes to Kyle's playgroup with Andy Sugden's (Kelvin Fletcher) son, Jack and she panics when Joanie thinks that she remembers her face. Thinking that Amy is studying childcare at college, Joanie asks her to look after Kyle, and they start to become friends. Concerned about how frequently Amy is looking after Kyle, Eric Pollard (Chris Chittell) visits Joanie and accidentally lets slip that Amy is Kyle's birth mother. Joanie is livid and threatens to call the police, but Eric calms her down, and she throws him out. The following day, Eric and Amy visit Joanie again but Eric tells Amy to stay in the car. He and Joanie talk about Amy and Kyle as they watch him play with a ball. While their backs are turned, the ball rolls onto the front garden and Kyle chases it. Amy grabs him and returns him to Joanie, who promptly accuses her of kidnapping Kyle. Joanie decides to give Amy a second chance and let her see Kyle. However, when Val Pollard (Charlie Hardwick) and Amy take Joanie and Kyle for a picnic, Kyle slips and falls into a river. Amy rescues him and they are rushed to hospital, where an upset and angry Joanie bans Amy from having any further contact with Kyle. Thinking she can get Kyle back as she and Andy could give him a better lifestyle, Amy contacts Social Services and Joanie hears this from Amy's mother, Kerry (Laura Norton). Joanie confronts Amy and an explosive argument ensues, leading to Joanie slapping Amy when she insults Karen. Amy slaps her back and Joanie angrily declares that Amy will not see Kyle again.

Amy visits Joanie a week later and Joanie sends her love to Diane Sugden (Elizabeth Estensen) following Cameron Murray's (Dominic Power) hostage siege at The Woolpack, as she saw it on the news. Joanie reveals that she has spoken to Social Services and that Amy will not get custody because she is Kyle's legal guardian. She also tells Amy to leave her and Kyle alone. Social Services confirm this to Amy but this simply makes her desperate for contact with her son as she now regrets having him adopted. Amy plans to snatch Kyle and go on the run. Kerry tells her that it is a bad idea but Amy refuses to listen. Knowing how it feels to not have contact with your child, Kerry helps Amy take Kyle from playgroup and drove her to the ferry. She even grabbed a pushchair that had been left in the carpark but Eric, Val and Cain caught up with them. Cain found Amy and told her what life on the run would be like and persuaded her to return Kyle to his grandmother but Amy stays on the ferry, knowing that she would not be allowed any contact and could even face a criminal prosecution.

Joanie returns in June 2015 after calling Cain for help. It transpires that Joanie is living on a very rough council estate, after her long deceased husband never paid the taxes before he died, leading to her losing her house and Social Services trying to take Kyle away from her, however they were unsuccessful. He gives Joanie a deposit for a flat, but on the condition that he never sees her again. The next day, she and Kyle arrive in the village, despite Cain's warnings not to return. She moves in with Cain's father and stepmother, Zak (Steve Halliwell) and Lisa (Jane Cox), after being harshly turned away by a volatile Val and Eric. Cain threatens Joanie to leave the village, which she does abruptly out of fear. Lisa, Zak and their daughter Belle (Eden Taylor-Draper) later go to Joanie's council estate and take her back to Emmerdale, with no excuses. In August 2015, Joanie is injured in a helicopter crash during Debbie Dingle (Charley Webb) and Pete Barton's (Anthony Quinlan) wedding reception. She is pulled from the rubble by Chas Dingle (Lucy Pargeter) and Aaron Livesy (Danny Miller), and is hysterical when she realises that Kyle is still trapped in the wreckage. She is relieved when Cain saves Kyle moments before the helicopter explodes.

Zak later develops feelings for Joanie despite being married to Lisa. He eventually kisses her, and is delighted when she responds. They begin an affair, however on Christmas Eve 2015, Belle catches the pair kissing. Belle reveals Zak and Joanie's affair at the dinner table on Christmas Day, and Zak and Joanie are subsequently kicked out of the house and Zak is exiled from the family. When Lisa suffers an angina attack due to the stress of losing Zak, Belle tries to persuade him to visit her, but Joanie informs Zak that she heard that Lisa got drunk. When Zak reveals this to Belle, she flies into a rage and angrily slaps Joanie and attacks her, but Cain pulls her away and Joanie is left stunned by Belle's violent streak, and Zak warns her that it is a sign of Belle's mental illness returning. When out poaching with Zak in the wood, Joanie accidentally shoots Zak's son Sam Dingle (James Hooton), who was running to get help after Megan Macey (Gaynor Faye) went into labour. Joanie is later devastated when her daughter, Karen's, ring is stolen, and when it is revealed to be Belle who stole it and she insults her and Karen, Joanie slaps Belle in front of Zak, Lisa and the other factory workers.

Zak and Joanie marry, despite Zak slipping up and calling Joanie "Lisa" on his stag do. After going to see Lisa, and questioning Lisa over whether or not Zak still loves her, Lisa tells Joanie that Zak would not have broken up their 18-year marriage for anything other than love, and obviously Zak hadn't been in love with Lisa for a very long time, or else he would not have fallen in love with Joanie so quickly. Lisa gives Joanie her blessing to marry Zak, and even though it breaks her heart, she watches as Joanie and Zak marry. At the hospital, Joanie is called as "Mrs Dingle", and as Lisa is there, it causes some confusion. While Lisa was going to change her name back to her maiden name, Joanie feels guilty as Lisa would have no need to change her name if it wasn't for her so Joanie then changes her name to "Joanie Dingle-Wright", as she realises that she doesn't actually want to lose her name of "Wright" as her daughter, Kyle's adoptive mother, kept it as well. Joanie decides this is fair for everyone, as she gets to take Zak's name, while ensuring that Lisa gets to keep "Mrs Dingle" and still having a connection with her daughter. Joanie and Zak separate when she realises he loves Lisa more than her, and she is later imprisoned for assaulting a police officer while defending Kerry. Lisa collects Joanie when she is released at the end of January 2017. While they are talking about Zak and Lisa getting back together, Joanie suddenly goes into cardiac arrest and dies.

== DS Shields ==
DS Shields
- Emmerdale character
- Portrayed by: Jayne Ashbourne
- First appearance: Episode 6631; 14 August 2013
- Last appearance: Episode 6688; 17 October 2013
In-universe information
- Occupation: Detective Sergeant

Detective Sergeant Shields, played by Jayne Ashbourne was one of the police officers who investigated the discovery of Alex Moss (Kurtis Stacey)'s body on the Home Farm estate. She appeared on a recurring basis between August and October 2013 after Katie Macey (Sammy Winward) anonymously reported that a body had been discovered on the site of a new glamping site that belonged to her husband Declan Macey (Jason Merrells), which he had paid the workers including Neil Gutterson (Cameron Stuart) and Thomas Hillam (Peter Toon) to cover up. The latter did report Declan for paying them. Adam Barton (Adam Thomas) later assaults Declan and is subsequently arrested and questioned about Alex's murder. The real murderer Cameron Murray (Dominic Power) had planted a glove covered in Adam's DNA near where Alex's body had been buried and due to her relationship with Alex, Adam's mother Moira Barton (Natalie J Robb) was also suspected. When the police searched their home Butler's Farm, Moira's boyfriend Cain Dingle (Jeff Hordley) distracted them so Adam could make an escape.

Subsequently Cain's half sister Chas Dingle (Lucy Pargeter) and daughter Debbie Dingle (Charley Webb), both of which had previously had romantic relationships with Cameron, decided to report their suspicions that he had murdered Alex as they had their suspicions that he also murdered Gennie Walker (Sian Reese-Williams) so Shields along with DC Flanagan interviewed them, but did not find enough evidence to arrest Cameron so they set up cameras in Debbie's house to see if they could gain a confession from Cameron. Debbie agreed reluctantly. Cameron confessed to killing Carl King (Tom Lister) out of the cameras' reach, so Debbie wore one, which gained his confession, but then told him about the wires, which caused him to hold her hostage. She managed to escape and Cameron was arrested.

== DC Andrew Flanagan ==
Andrew Flannagan
- Emmerdale character
- Portrayed by: Tom Roberts
- Duration: 2013-2014, 2018
- First appearance: Episode 6631; 14 August 2013
- Last appearance: Episode 8175; 13 June 2018
In-universe information
- Occupation: Detective Constable; Detective Sergeant

Detective Constable Andrew Flanagan, played by Tom Roberts, was one of the police officers who investigated the discovery of Alex Moss (Kurtis Stacey)'s body on the Home Farm estate. He appeared on a recurring basis between August and October 2013 and throughout 2014 and returned in 2018. This was Roberts' fifth role in Emmerdale and his most prolific.

He first appeared when Katie Macey (Sammy Winward) anonymously reported that a body had been discovered on the site of a new glamping site that belonged to her husband Declan Macey (Jason Merrells), which he had paid the workers including Neil Gutterson (Cameron Stuart) and Thomas Hillam (Peter Toon) to cover up. The latter did report Declan for paying them. Adam Barton (Adam Thomas) later assaults Declan and is subsequently arrested and questioned about Alex's murder. The real murderer Cameron Murray (Dominic Power) had planted a glove covered in Adam's DNA near where Alex's body had been buried and due to her relationship with Alex, Adam's mother Moira Barton (Natalie J Robb) was also suspected. When the police searched their home Butler's Farm, Moira's boyfriend Cain Dingle (Jeff Hordley) distracted them so Adam could make an escape.

Subsequently Cain's half sister Chas Dingle (Lucy Pargeter) and daughter Debbie Dingle (Charley Webb), both of which had previously had romantic relationships with Cameron, decided to report their suspicions that he had murdered Alex as they had their suspicions that he also murdered Gennie Walker (Sian Reese-Williams) so Shields along with DS Shields interviewed them, but did not find enough evidence to arrest Cameron so they set up cameras in Debbie's house to see if they could gain a confession from Cameron. Debbie agreed reluctantly. Cameron confessed to killing Carl King (Tom Lister) out of the cameras' reach, so Debbie wore one, which gained his confession, but then told him about the wires, which caused him to hold her hostage. She managed to escape and Cameron was arrested.

A month later Flanagan had informed Debbie that Cameron had escaped from a prison van. This led to him returning to the village and holding many villagers including Debbie and Chas along with Debbie's grandfather Zak Dingle (Steve Halliwell), her son Jack Sugden, her cousin Marlon Dingle (Mark Charnock), as well as Alicia Gallagher (Natalie Anderson), Ruby Haswell (Alicya Eyo), Dan Spencer (Liam Fox), Diane Sugden (Elizabeth Estensen), Bernice Blackstock (Samantha Giles), Nicola King (Nicola Wheeler), David Metcalfe (Matthew Wolfenden) and Priya Sharma (Fiona Wade) in a storyline known as The Woolpack Siege. As a result, Cameron ended up being electrocuted and killed whereas everyone else survived.

In 2014, Flanagan was contacted by Debbie after learning about Claire's Law, being a Domestic Violence Disclosure Scheme and asked if he could do a background check on new boyfriend, Pete Barton (Anthony Quinlan) to make sure he wasn't like Cameron. It was found that Pete had an old assault conviction years ago, which made Debbie reconsider the relationship. He also appeared when Megan Macey (Gaynor Faye) had her suspicions that her sister-in-law Charity Macey (Emma Atkins) was trying to poison her brother Declan. She then realised it was the other way around, but she slapped the detective when trying to leave the interview room, meaning she would spend another night in a cell.

In 2018, Flanagan appeared again to investigate the acid attack on Ross Barton (Michael Parr), by this point, he was demoted to Detective Sergeant. Debbie's daughter Sarah Sugden (Katie Hill) told Flanagan that her mother paid Simon McManus to attack Ross. McManus had previously been charged and found not guilty. Debbie denied, but although not convinced, there was no evidence to charge her.

== Lindy Haswell ==
Lindy Haswell
- Emmerdale character
- Portrayed by: Nimmy March
- First appearance: Episode 6683; 11 October 2013
- Last appearance: Episode 6685; 15 October 2013
In-universe information
- Daughters: Ruby Haswell

Lindy Haswell, played by Nimmy March, made her first screen appearance on 11 October 2013. The character and March's casting was announced on 21 September 2013. Lindy is Ruby Haswell's (Alicya Eyo) mother. A show spokesperson commented that Lindy and Ruby's relationship "is far from rosy" and Ruby becomes desperate to keep her identity a secret from her girlfriend Ali (Kelli Hollis).

Lindy comes to the village to visit her daughter Ruby, after Ruby calls her asking for money towards fertility treatment. During Lindy's visit, Ruby tells her that she is a lesbian and in a relationship with Ali Spencer. Lindy tells Ruby that she will give her the money, but only if she leaves Ali as a baby with two mothers is unnatural. Ruby initially agrees to Lindy's offer, but changes her mind after talking with Ali's son Sean Spencer (Luke Roskell).

== James Barton ==
James Barton
- Emmerdale character
- Portrayed by: Bill Ward
- Duration: 2013–2017
- First appearance: Episode 6696; 25 October 2013
- Last appearance: Episode 7955; 6 October 2017
In-universe information
- Occupation: Farmer
- Brothers: John Barton
- Wife: Emma Barton (1989–2016)
- Sons: Pete Barton; Ross Barton; Finn Barton; Adam Barton
- Stepsons: Lewis Barton
- Grandsons: Moses Dingle
- Nephews: Matty Barton
- Nieces: Holly Barton

James Barton, played by Bill Ward, made his first screen appearance on 25 October 2013. The character and Ward's casting was announced on 29 August 2013. The actor began filming his first scenes in September. Of his casting, ex-Coronation Street actor Ward said "I'm really looking forward to it. The Emmerdale team are a very talented bunch indeed and I'm extremely chuffed to have been asked to join them." Series producer Kate Oates commented that she was "delighted" to welcome Ward to the show and added that the arrival of his character would mark a new era for the popular Barton family. James is the older brother of John Barton (James Thornton). The brothers were estranged at the time of John's death due to a rift that was not healed. James is a single father to three sons and is a farmer like John. He makes "an unexpected visit" to John's widow Moira (Natalie J. Robb) at Butler's farm. Ward left the show and James was killed off. In August 2017, Ward was longlisted for Best Exit at the Inside Soap Awards, while James' death and the motorway crash were longlisted for Best Show-Stopper and Emma killing James was longlisted for Best Shock Twist. All three nominations made their shortlists. On 6 November 2017, Ward won the "Best Show-Stopper" accolade.

James is contacted by his sister-in-law, Moira, who reveals that his son, Ross (Michael Parr), is staying at her farm in Emmerdale. James arrives at the farm and it emerges that he and Ross have not seen each other in years. It is suggested over a period of weeks that James has feelings for Moira, and it is later revealed they had a dalliance many years ago. James' two other sons, Pete (Anthony Quinlan) and Finn (Joe Gill) also arrive in Emmerdale. The night before a meeting about the farm's potential supermarket contract, James tells Moira that he still has feelings for her and believes she does for him too. She is angry and the following day she tells Cain. However, James overcomes his feelings for Moira and begins a relationship with Chas Dingle (Lucy Pargeter). In 2014, James begins to believe that his nephew Adam (Adam Thomas), the son of his late brother John (James Thornton), may in fact be his son, as he had a one-night stand with Moira months before Adam's birth. Moira is eager to ignore James' questions, but he is adamant that Adam is his son. James secretly gets DNA proof that Adam is his son and tells Moira, but she begs him not to tell anyone. The first person he informs is Chas. Later, whilst watching an old video of the family, Moira and James are seen to be arguing in the background and it is later revealed that James is Adam's biological father.

In early 2015, James' ex-wife, Emma (Gillian Kearney), comes back into his life after Finn contacted her. Things are initially hostile between the two of them, due to Emma's manipulative nature and her constant antagonising of Chas. It is also revealed that Emma tried to kill Ross when he was an infant, which James is shocked to learn that Pete knew about. This is soon revealed by Pete's girlfriend Debbie Dingle (Charley Webb), and Ross is furious, however he later forgives Emma. Eventually, after a night of drinking, James and Emma sleep together, with James desperate to keep this from Chas. Emma cannot resist telling her, however, and so Chas throws a pint of beer in her face. Chas' fiery son, Aaron Livesy (Danny Miller), strikes James over the head with a glass bottle in front of a busy pub for cheating on Chas. After this, James and Emma reconcile. When it is revealed that Ross fathered the imprisoned Charity Dingle's (Emma Atkins) baby, Moses, James and Emma become the baby's guardians when Ross goes missing. James is stunned when Pete reveals that he accidentally killed Ross during an altercation, but it is later revealed that Ross is actually alive and comatose in hospital. He eventually recovers and a vicious feud between him and Pete ensues.

After Moira splits up from her husband Cain Dingle (Jeff Hordley) following the death of her daughter Holly Barton (Sophie Powles), she and James have sex, despite him now being engaged to Emma. Ross discovers this, and while helping James and Emma move into their new cottage, accidentally knocks James down the stairs while confronting him. Emma soon discovers about James' cheating with Moira, and so keeps him prisoner in their new cottage, with James unable to escape due to his leg injury after his fall down the stairs. Emma forces James to get married, however he strikes Emma over the head with a glass bottle, knocking her unconscious momentarily. Emma then lunges at James, knocking him over, however he kicks her leg, leading to her falling and hitting her head on the table. James then manages to escape with great difficulty due to his injury, and manages to find his way to a nearby bridge. He is stunned to see that Emma has followed him, and another argument about Moira ensues. When Emma realises that James is lying to her when he tells her he loves her, she angrily pushes him in a rage, however this causes James to fall onto Ashley Thomas' (John Middleton) car, causing it to flip dramatically. This causes a huge pile up, involving fellow villagers Aaron, Robert Sugden (Ryan Hawley), Lachlan White (Thomas Atkinson), Rhona Goskirk (Zoe Henry), Paddy Kirk (Dominic Brunt) and Pierce Harris (Jonathan Wrather). James is rushed to hospital, and Emma is left panic-stricken to be told by Finn that James is still alive. However, James succumbs to his injuries, and dies from major trauma in a similar fashion to that of his late brother, John, with his family watching devastated from afar.

In October 2017, James returns as an apparition appearing to Emma after she accidentally shoots and kills Finn, and steals Moira's newborn baby. After Emma commits suicide by jumping from a viaduct, the ghosts of both James and Finn appear to welcome Emma to the afterlife.

== Harriet Finch ==
Harriet Finch
- Emmerdale character
- Portrayed by: Katherine Dow Blyton
- Duration: 2013–2022
- First appearance: Episode 6719; 21 November 2013
- Last appearance: Episode 9496; 17 October 2022
In-universe information
- Other names: Michelle
- Occupation: Private detective Vicar; Police Officer
- Mother: Mildred Finch
- Other relatives: Edna Birch; Lily Butterfield; Eve Jenson; Peter Birch

Harriet Finch, played by Katherine Dow Blyton, made her first screen appearance on 21 November 2013 and her last appearance on 17 October 2022 when she was killed during a storm to celebrate Emmerdale's 50th birthday. The character and casting was announced on 31 October 2013. Of her casting, Dow Blyton commented "I am delighted to be joining the cast of Emmerdale. Harriet is great fun and I'm looking forward to seeing the character unfold." Harriet is a relative of established character Edna Birch (Shirley Stelfox) and will become a rival for Ashley Thomas (John Middleton), who wants to be the vicar of St Mary's church again. Harriet befriends Dom Andrews (Wil Johnson) and helps his daughter Gemma (Tendai Rinomhota) with a school project. When Gemma goes missing, Harriet, Ashley and many other locals help Dom find her. Harriet is the person who spots Gemma lying in a ditch, and demands that Zak Dingle (Steve Halliwell) calls for an ambulance. Harriet goes to the hospital with Dom and is devastated when the doctors reveal that Gemma has died. Harriet tries to help Dom through his grief, but he throws her out of his house. Harriet is the vicar who performs Gemma's funeral. Dom later apologises to her for his actions.

Harriet becomes curious when Ashley begins talking about a woman he met named Carole (Tracy Brabin). Harriet believes that Ashley is making Carole up, so she texts Carole from Ashley's mobile phone to meet him in Emmerdale village. Harriet is later shocked when Carole arrives in Emmerdale and is jealous as she secretly has feelings for Ashley. Harriet officiates an unauthorized wedding blessing for Ruby and Ali at St. Mary's church and is later sacked by the bishop. Harriet is eventually reinstated as vicar of St. Mary's Church following Ashley's retirement, due to his diagnosis with Vascular dementia. Harriet begins a relationship with Cain Dingle (Jeff Hordley), hiding it from others. Harriet is stalked by her ex-fiance Will Taylor (Dean Andrews), who is the father of Dawn (Olivia Bromley); when the stalking comes to a head, they reconcile their relationship. Will's gun is stolen by his grandson Lucas (Dexter Ansell). When Harriet gives the gun to Cain to dispose, he accidentally shoots his son Nate Robinson (Jurell Carter), which causes DI Mark Malone (Mark Womack) to arrive in the village to investigate the shooting. Mark knows Harriet from her time in the police force, and the pair begin an affair. However, Dawn discovers he is corrupt and exposes him to the police force. He attempts to kill Dawn, until she shoots him. Harriet helps her to bury his body.

Following Mark's arrival in the village, actress Blyton stated that despite the characters having a "history" with each other, Harriet is "not happy about him being back in their lives". Harriet does not know that Mark is forcing Cain to do drug runs for him. Blyton explains that whilst Harriet may not know all of the details, "she knows something's not right", which prompts her to "put her detective head on again and try to get to the bottom of it". She added that Harriet will "take some quite big risks" to protect Dawn and Will, and when asked if she is capable of taking him down, she teased: "watch this space — and believe in girl power!". Following Mark's murder, Blyton admitted that her character may be "too far gone for a redemption story", and that she would be axed. She explained: "You always worry that your days might be numbered. There have got to be consequences, whether that happens a year down the line or two years down the line, you can't get away with murder. But I'll stay for as long as they want me to stay. I love the show and the role; thank heavens for it." Digital Spy stated that prior to the storyline, Harriet was a fan-favourite character, but that "viewers have lost faith" following her actions. Despite the opinions on her character, Blyton's performance in the storyline was praised by viewers, with people describing her as "incredible" and stating that they will be "worshipping" her. Following Harriet's guilt over what happened to Mark, she locks herself in a basement. Since she is at "breaking point" and is trying to "unburden herself", she "needs time to reflect, to find her faith again". Harriet convinces that the best option is to lock herself away, though he thinks "that Harriet has lost her marbles". Blyton recalled a conversation that she had with executive producer Jane Hudson, where they agreed that they had to "ground Harriet". She explained: "it wouldn't be a rocking back and forth kind of madness: she wouldn't be climbing the walls. Instead, she needs time to ground herself." She added that while in real life she is not religious at all, her character "just doesn't know how to live without her faith", and without her role as a vicar, she would be "pretty lost".

The character made a surprise departure from the series on 17 October 2022 when she was killed off as part of the show's 50th anniversary celebrations.

In 2021, Laura-Jayne Tyler called Harriet rejoining the police the "most hilariously batty soap storyline in a long time", and joked whether Harriet would have to investigate the murder that she had helped cover up, calling it "Brillant".

== Gil Keane ==
Gil Keane
- Emmerdale character
- Portrayed by: David Easter
- First appearance: 21 November 2013
- Last appearance: 11 December 2013

Gil Keane, played by David Easter, made his first screen appearance on 21 November 2013. The character and Easter's casting were announced on 5 November 2013. Gil is a businessman and acquaintance of Declan Macey (Jason Merrells). Declan contacts Gil, hoping that he can help him out with his financial problems. Declan believes Gil might be interested in buying his properties. Gil is attracted to Declan's half-sister Megan Macey (Gaynor Faye), and they begin dating for a short while. At a celebration party, Declan begins gambling and if he wins, then Gil has to invest in Home Farm. Megan manages to stop the proceedings, which infuriates Declan. Gil leaves, and Declan slaps Megan for ruining his chances.

== Pete Barton ==
Pete Barton
- Emmerdale character
- Portrayed by: Anthony Quinlan
- Duration: 2013–2020
- First appearance: Episode 6733; 6 December 2013
- Last appearance: Episode 8728; 10 February 2020
In-universe information
- Occupation: Farmhand; Businessman
- Father: James Barton
- Mother: Emma Barton
- Brothers: Ross Barton; Finn Barton
- Half-brothers: Adam Barton; Lewis Barton
- Wife: Debbie Dingle (2015–2016)
- Stepsons: Jack Sugden
- Stepdaughters: Sarah Sugden
- Uncles: John Barton
- Nephews: Moses Dingle
- Nieces: Leyla Sugden
- First cousins: Holly Barton; Matty Barton

Pete Barton, played by Anthony Quinlan, made his first screen appearance on 6 December 2013. The character and casting was announced on 5 November 2013. Of joining Emmerdale, the ex-Hollyoaks actor Quinlan commented "I'm really excited to be part of Emmerdale as it's an iconic serial drama. I'm privileged to be working with such a great cast and crew on a fantastic production." Pete is the eldest of James Barton's (Bill Ward) sons. He is "a nice guy", who cares for his family, even when he finds himself at odds with his brother Ross (Michael Parr). Quinlan was nominated for the "Sexiest Male" award at The British Soap Awards 2014. On 30 November 2019, Quinlan quit Emmerdale, and his last scenes aired on 10 February 2020.

Pete and his brother Ross find themselves battling for the affections of Debbie Dingle (Charley Webb). Debbie and Pete sleep together after they fix Debbie's Land Rover together when it breaks down. Pete tries to be friendly with Debbie's daughter Sarah, who takes a shine to him. She draws a picture of him, which Debbie sees on the fridge where he lives. Debbie tells him she wants to sleep with him, but he declines, shocked, saying she scarcely pays him attention. Pete and Debbie later get back together, but the pair argue when Pete takes Sarah out on her bike, and Debbie tells him that if Sarah falls and cuts herself, she could die after her fanconi anaemia. Pete shouts at Debbie, saying she should have told him, before storming off. Pete and Debbie however make up and get engaged.

When Charity Dingle (Emma Atkins), Debbie's mother, gives birth while in prison and the baby, Moses stays with them, days before Debbie and Pete's wedding, the paternity is confirmed as Ross and everybody takes a hatred to him for not saying anything. Pete un-invites Ross to the wedding. On their wedding day, Pete finds out that Debbie has been cheating on him with Ross, before he can say anything however, a helicopter crashes into the venue. Debbie is seriously injured and while at the hospital, Pete and Ross fight, resulting in Pete thinking that he has killed Ross, he puts him into the boot of his car and takes him too the woods where he leaves his body and then goes to Debbie who is now conscious, forgives her and tells her never to mention Ross again, as he would have probably moved away anyway, which Debbie believes has happened.

After the police found a body that they thought was Ross, Pete confessed everything to Debbie as he was certain that he would be caught as the killer. After confessing, Debbie was left in shock and later told Pete that when James and Emma went to identify the body, it was not Ross's. Debbie storms out, shocked by the news that her husband has just delivered. Pete's father, James, goes into Debbie's house and finds Pete broken down on the floor. Pete then confesses the truth to his dad, and James demands that Pete show him where he hid Ross's body. However, when they drive into the woods and locate the place, Ross is nowhere to be seen. He is later seen in a hospital bed, recovering from the injuries that he suffered during his altercation with Pete.

Ross discharges himself from the hospital later that week and returns to the village and makes his way to Butler's Farm. When Pete returns to the farm, Ross greets him with the line "Hello bruv, bet you weren't expecting to see me again..." Within minutes of his return, Ross and Pete find themselves arguing again, and Ross throws a punch. However, when he extends his arm, he falls to the floor unconscious. Moira Dingle (Natalie J. Robb) walks in and immediately presumes that Pete has attempted to kill his brother once again, as do the rest of his family, until Ross regains consciousness in hospital and tells his loved ones that Pete was not to blame. Soon after Pete's confession he and Debbie separate due to his actions reminding her of ex-fiancé Cameron Murray and the fact she still loves Ross. The marriage is later annulled.

After growing closer to Moira, who was married to his uncle John Barton and had a son with his father James, Pete makes a rejected pass at her. Feeling ashamed, Pete deliberately assaults Ross to get arrested. As he is on licence, he is sentenced to prison, which he intended as a way of paying for his behaviour towards Ross and Moira.

Pete returns on 5 May 2016 when he is released from prison. He gave Robert Sugden (Ryan Hawley) a letter from Gordon Livesy (Gary Mavers) to his son Aaron (Danny Miller). Pete was reunited with his family. Ross discovers James's recent fling with Moira and pushes him down the stairs of James and Emma's new cottage, causing him to break his leg. A jealous and paranoid Emma locks James in their cottage, keeping him prisoner, and makes excuses to her sons about his absence. Pete later attends his father's funeral with the rest of his family, not knowing that Emma was the cause of it. Moira is depressed after the death of her daughter Holly and kisses Pete.

When Pete discovers that Moira is cheating on husband Cain Dingle (Jeff Hordley), he keeps it from Cain. When it emerges that Pete knew, Cain holds him hostage and beats him. Pete stops working for Moira, and begins working at Kim Tate's (Claire King) farm alongside Nate Robinson (Jurell Carter). Pete feels there is nothing left in the village for him, and leaves. His last scenes aired on 10 February 2020.

== Finn Barton ==
Finn Barton
- Emmerdale character
- Portrayed by: Joe Gill
- Duration: 2013–2017
- First appearance: Episode 6733; 6 December 2013
- Last appearance: Episode 7955; 6 October 2017
In-universe information
- Occupation: B&B Assistant (2013–2016); Businessman (2016–2017); Taxi driver (2016–2017)
- Father: James Barton
- Mother: Emma Barton
- Brothers: Pete Barton; Ross Barton
- Half-brothers: Adam Barton; Lewis Barton
- Uncles: John Barton
- Nephews: Moses Dingle
- First cousins: Holly Barton; Matty Barton

Finn Barton, played by Joe Gill, made his first appearance on 6 December 2013. The character and casting was announced on 5 November 2013. Of his casting, Gill said, "I'm very grateful to be given this opportunity. The cast and crew have been class with me so far and the fact I'm able to learn from these experienced professionals everyday is just brilliant. I'm hoping my character can contribute to how amazing the show is doing at the moment." Finn is the youngest of James Barton's (Bill Ward) sons. Unlike his brothers, he has a university education and plans that do not involve rural living. Finn made a previously unannounced departure from the serial on 5 October 2017, where the character was killed off after being accidentally shot by his own mother Emma Barton (Gillian Kearney). He made a further appearance on 6 October 2017, when he appeared as a ghost to Emma, however this was his last.

Upon his arrival, Finn reveals to Val Pollard (Charlie Hardwick) that he is gay and has a crush on David Metcalfe (Matthew Wolfenden), who just happens to be Val's stepson. Finn befriends Victoria Sugden (Isabel Hodgins) and begins working for Val and her husband Eric (Chris Chittell) at the B&B and later takes up a job working for Declan Macey (Jason Merrells), whom he reveals he also has a crush on. Finn makes a plan to move to Tokyo to start a new life, but realises he does not have enough money. He applies for another job and asks Declan to give him a reference. However, Declan gives him a disappointing reference of £15. Finn later leaves and returns to the B&B.

Finn is attacked by a man posing as his date, who actually wants to get back at Ross. Finn is left in a car with the exhaust on, and almost dies until he is rescued by Pete and Cain. Finn grows exasperated with Ross' antics and dangerous jobs. Along with his family, Finn tries to be supportive for Ross when Donna Windsor (Verity Rushworth) dies. Nobody had realised that Ross was in love with Donna, and everyone tries to be there for him, but Ross lashes out and wants nothing from his family. Finn discovers that Adam Barton (Adam Thomas), who he had previously believed to be his cousin, is actually his half-brother, after a brief affair between Finn's aunt Moira Barton (Natalie J. Robb) and Finn's father James. This causes ripples through the family and Finn is initially devastated and thinks that his mother's absence in his childhood was James' fault, but James insists that his mother left for another reason.

Finn, with the help of Harriet Finch (Katherine Dow Blyton), tracks down his mother, Emma Barton (Gillian Kearney). At first, things are awkward but a bond soon forms between Emma and Finn, and he desperately tries to convince the rest of his family to accept her back into the fold. Pete refuses to, but Ross is slightly more open. It is revealed that after the birth of Ross, Emma suffered from post-natal depression and later had Finn, which tipped her over the edge. She was consumed by paranoia about Moira and James and led to her trying to suffocate a young Ross with a pillow, which Pete had witnessed. Emma had left after this, when Finn was just a baby, and had only returned once to which Pete had told her to leave in order to protect his family. After hearing this, Ross and Finn turn against Emma. In time, they forgave her, and eventually move in together in Andy Sugden's (Kelvin Fletcher) old flat.

When Val nearly dies from pneumonia, Finn meets her nurse Darren Thompson (Danny Horn). Finn meets Darren for a drink but whilst in the toilets, Darren receives a text warning him off Finn and leaves. Later they reunite and enjoy a brief relationship, until Val panics about Darren's HIV status and frames Finn for vandalising Darren's car, so that Darren will break up with Finn. When Finn discovers Val was behind the break up of his relationship, he is furious, but after learning that in her own confused way she was trying to protect him, he forgives her and she helps him reunite with Darren. However, they soon break up again when Darren becomes too clingy and time-consuming for Finn. Finn discovers Ross is having an affair with Pete's fiancée Debbie Dingle (Charley Webb). Finn warns Debbie off the idea, but Ross orders Finn to back off. As Pete's best man, Finn struggles with whether to tell his brother about the affair but decides against it.

On the day of Pete and Debbie's wedding, a recording of Debbie confessing that she loves Ross is accidentally played. Shortly afterwards, a helicopter crashes into the village hall. Finn is pulled free from the wreckage by his parents. Val is killed, devastating Finn. In a video she recorded during her bout with pneumonia, Val calls Finn her favourite and jokes that she wants him to tattoo her name over his heart with her ashes mixed in the ink. He helps her sister Diane Sugden (Elizabeth Estensen) carry out her final wishes. Emma becomes concerned when Ross goes missing and Finn helps her search morgues and hospitals for him. Ross later shows up and reveals that Pete left him for dead. At first the family shun Pete, but Finn tries to reach out to his brother.

Finn is given an interesting bet by Jimmy King (Nick Miles), who proposes that if Finn can perform any dare he or his sister-in-law Bernice Blackstock (Samantha Giles) have given him, then he will pay him £100. Jimmy formulates almost unthinkable dares for Finn, thinking he will easily earn the £100 from Finn in order to fix his own financial problems. However, Finn, undertaking dares such as wearing a dress, waxing his thighs, and drinking a blended English breakfast, appears to show no mercy to these challenges, making Jimmy nervous. Jimmy's final dare for Finn was to re-enact a performance of his daughter's favourite film, Frozen. Bernice's daughter suggests they double the bet to £200 and both parties agree. When Finn performs the 2013 film Frozen, Jimmy informs him he has lost the bet as his daughter's favourite film was in fact the 2013 film Frozen. Finn tells Jimmy he has been conned, but Jimmy stands firm and Finn produces his money. Finn and his brothers set up their own taxi firm, Barton Brothers, operating from their home.

Finn discovers the truth about James' death after finding Emma unconscious in the river following a fight with Gabby Thomas (Rosie Bentham). Emma then locks him in the church to stop him telling Ross and Pete. Diane later finds Finn and he escapes. Finn later goes searching for Emma in the woods, however he is accidentally shot by Emma, who was startled by a noise. The following day, a badly wounded Finn runs into the road where Cain and Harriet help him. Finn is rushed to the hospital and is later visited by Ross, Pete and Victoria. Finn later descends into cardiac arrest, but the doctors fail to revive him and he subsequently dies. Ross, Pete and Victoria are devastated, and Victoria later phones Moira and Tracy Metcalfe (Amy Walsh) to inform them of Finn's death. Emma, who is on the run with Moira's newborn baby, hears of Finn's death on the radio, and after battling with her guilt, commits suicide by throwing herself from a viaduct. Finn then reappears to Emma as an apparition alongside James, who welcomes Emma to the afterlife.

== Other characters ==
Date(s)	Character	Actor	Circumstances
13–24 May	Kirk Stoker	Matt Kennard	A shady young businessman, introduced to Debbie Dingle (Charley Webb) by mutual friend, Robbie Lawson (Jamie Shelton). However Robbie becomes jealous when Kirk and Debbie go on a date or two, and after the pair fall out, Robbie tricks Debbie into thinking the disgruntled Kirk is trying to harm her, convincing her that he knows what he can be like. Robbie even goes to extreme measures such as smashing Debbie's windows, saying it must have been Kirk and persuading her to let him protect her and her kids. It is clear that Robbie has a crush on Debbie and hopes to win her affections. However, Debbie learns the truth after finding out that Kirk could not have been responsible for harassing her as her father put him in hospital after thinking he was.
29 May–17 June	Natalie	Gemma Danielle Salusbury	A farm-girl who lives with her family on a neighbouring farm to the Barton's. She is a supplier to Butler's Farm and Moira Barton (Natalie J. Robb) hires her after her son Adam (Adam Thomas) quits his job. Adam had previously tried to bribe Natalie into seducing Moira's partner Cain Dingle (Jeff Hordley).
19 June, 19 August	Thomas Hillam	Peter Toon	A workman who Declan Macey (Jason Merrells) pays to cover up the dead body of Alex Moss (Kurtis Stacey).
1–26 August	Gary Benson	Stephen Donald	Rhona Goskirk's (Zoe Henry) drug dealer.
