= Ross Barton =

Fictional character from Emmerdale

- Emmerdale character
- Portrayed by: Michael Parr
- Duration: 2013–2018, 2024–present
- First appearance: Episode 6600; 9 July 2013
- Introduced by: Kate Oates (2013); Iain MacLeod (2024)
- Crossover appearances: Corriedale (2026)
In-universe information
- Occupation: Mechanic; Career criminal Businessman
- Father: James Barton
- Mother: Emma Barton
- Brothers: Pete Barton; Finn Barton
- Half-brothers: Adam Barton; Lewis Barton
- Sons: Moses Dingle
- Daughters: Leyla Sugden
- Uncles: John Barton
- First cousins: Holly Barton; Matty Barton

Ross Barton is a fictional character from the British ITV soap opera Emmerdale, portrayed by Michael Parr. He made his first appearance in episode 6600 of the soap, broadcast on 9 July 2013. Ross first appears as the carjacker of Laurel Thomas (Charlotte Bellamy), before being revealed to be the nephew of Moira Barton (Natalie J. Robb). The character is initially characterised as a bad boy and a "nasty piece of work". The softer side of Ross' personality is explored when he enters a secret relationship with police officer Donna Windsor (Verity Rushworth), who has terminal cancer. When Donna dies, Ross bonds with her daughter April Windsor (Amelia Flanagan).

Producers created a whodunit storyline in 2015 when Charity Dingle (Emma Atkins) becomes pregnant and does not reveal the father. After giving birth to a son, Moses Dingle, Charity reveals that Ross is his father. Ross also embarks on an affair with Charity's daughter Debbie (Charley Webb), who at the time was engaged to Ross' older brother - Pete (Anthony Quinlan). The affair climaxes in the show's August stunt at Debbie and Pete's wedding.

Ross and Pete fight after the reveal, where Pete seemingly kills Ross and leaves his body in the woods. Parr confirmed that he had left the soap and a petition to reintroduce the character gained over 5,000 supporters. It was later revealed that the character is alive, with Parr stating that he liked the response to Ross' "death". The character later became involved in several of the show's major events, most significantly where Ross is revealed to have shot his enemy Robert Sugden (Ryan Hawley) in the Who Shot Robert Sugden? storyline; with Ross having formed a deal with Robert's adopted half-brother Andy (Kelvin Fletcher) that he would help kill his brother in exchange for Andy killing Pete, though Andy later changed his mind. In 2018, Ross became the subject of an acid attack in one of the show's most issued storylines and the character's most defying event. Parr researched extensively for the storyline. Parr's decision to leave the show was announced on 23 May 2018 and Ross departed on 2 November 2018, leaving the village to start anew with Robert's former sister-in-law Rebecca White (Emily Head) and their son Sebastian. For his portrayal of Ross Barton and through the character's story arc, Parr has received several award nominations - while critics have praised the character. On 17 September 2024 it was announced that Ross will return to the show later that year. His return aired on 28 October 2024.

== Casting ==
The character and Parr's casting was officially announced on 24 October 2013. On joining the show, Michael Parr stated "I am thrilled to be playing a regular character in Emmerdale. It was always the plan that Laurel's carjacker would be revealed as Moira Barton's (Natalie J. Robb) nephew – Ross Barton. It has been fun keeping his identity and my role a secret. Although I did nearly burst from wanting to tell people. Ross is a great character and there is lots to come for him in future episodes."

== Development ==
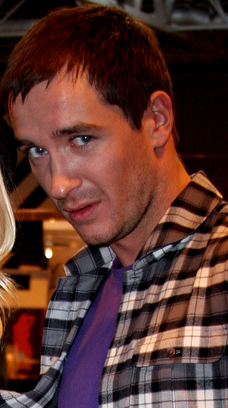
Ross was involved in a storyline where brother Pete, played by Anthony Quinlan, (pictured) was believed to have killed him.

Speaking of Ross' character, Parr explained "He [Ross] is a nasty piece of work, but nobody is just one thing. There are many levels to Ross, but all that we've seen so far is him just being a nasty piece of work. Over time you may see another side to him but predominantly he is that." Asked if Ross feels any guilt about what he's putting Laurel, Parr responded "There is an element of guilt but also he's out for himself - he's just trying to survive. Ross is an adapter, he's just doing whatever he has to do to get by"

In May 2014, in an interview with Digital Spy, Parr revealed that Ross makes a surprising alliance with Donna Windsor portrayed by Verity Rushworth. Asked what Ross makes of Donna, Parr replied "Donna is an attractive girl, but Ross knows that she's a police officer, so he doesn't trust her. Ross finds himself attracted to Donna and she has approached him with these deals to make money, so he's intrigued by her to start with."

=== Baby reveal ===
Emmerdale had a "Who's the daddy?" storyline in 2015 where it was a revealed after months of speculation that Ross was the father of Charity Dingle (Emma Atkins) baby Moses. Speaking about the twist, Parr, said: "I was chuffed to bits. I like working with kids and I have got a good relationship with Amelia, who plays April. I've got little sisters and I have always grown up around children. I got told that it was going to be a mystery and I had to keep my mouth zipped up. It has been good - a lot of people have guessed but I have never let anything go." Parr also teased that the latest twist will have huge repercussions for everyone involved if Debbie does eventually find out. He said: "When Debbie finds out, she is obviously going to react. But how she will react and if she will actually find out, we will have to wait and see." Other potential suspects included Cain Dingle (Jeff Hordley), Jai Sharma (Chris Bisson) and Declan Macey (Jason Merrells).

=== Fake death ===
On 6 August 2015, an episode aired where Ross got into a fight with brother Pete Barton (Anthony Quinlan) resulting in Pete seemingly killing Ross and dumping his body in the woods. Parr spoke of his 'exit' saying: "I'm sorry that I've had to keep this one a secret from you guys, Thank you so much for all your support over the last couple of years. I've had so much fun playing Ross. Thank you, keep watching the show, stay tuned and it's goodbye from me!" A petition to bring Ross back gained over 5,000 supporters. However a shock twist in an episode broadcast on 25 August 2015, where it was revealed that Ross had survived and was seen opening his eyes in a hospital bed. Discussing the huge secrecy involved in the storyline twist, Parr: "It's been difficult, fun and exciting. I've had to sneak in and out of the building at work to avoid being seen by fans outside, and I've even had to lie to family! People aren't idiots, so some people in my family have asked what I've been up to. I said that I've been working but I made a story up that I had a new job in a hotel. There's been a bit of speculation that Ross wasn't dead, so I've also been trying to throw people off. I was tweeting lies about going for auditions and stuff like that, so it's been good fun. The reactions I've had have been quite funny, actually - I've had so many different ones. It was funny when people were saying, 'You'll get something bigger' or 'This is going to be good for you, you'll get a film off the back of this'. I was thinking, 'No not really, because I'm still under contract!'"

=== Acid attack ===
On 5 November 2017, Parr confirmed that Ross would feature in an issue-based plot in 2018. The actor spent a lot of time researching for the story and said that he relied on his drama school studies for it. Parr told Daniel Kilkelly of Digital Spy that his new storyline is not "straightforward" and requires several acting techniques. On 30 January 2018, it was announced that Ross would be involved in an acid attack storyline after being attacked by drug dealer Simon McManus (Liam Ainsworth). The storyline commenced on 8 February 2018. Emmerdale decided to tackle to subject to raise awareness of how an attack can affect lives. Parr said that he is nervous about portraying the subject, commenting, "I know it's a reality for some people and it's so important to get it right and do the story justice." The story begins when Ross' employer, Joseph Tate (Ned Porteous), learns that Ross is working with Debbie Dingle (Charley Webb), who is Joe's enemy. Joe sacks Ross so Ross steals his car. Meanwhile, Debbie pays Simon to physically attack Joe and when Simon sees Ross stepping out of Joe's car, he believes Ross is Joe and throws acid in Ross' face. Duncan Lindsay, a reporter for the Metro, described the storyline as a "arduous and devastating journey" for Ross. The scenes prompted over 200 viewer complaints to broadcast regulator Ofcom.

=== Departure ===
On 23 May 2018, it was announced that Parr had decided to leave Emmerdale at the end of his contract.

== Storylines ==
Ross Barton made his first appearance when he hijacks local resident Laurel Thomas (Charlotte Bellamy), while she is waiting in her car. Laurel manages to escape and Ross takes the car. Laurel later tracks Ross down and tries to attack him with a pair of scissors, but she becomes scared of Ross. Cain Dingle (Jeff Hordley) and Marlon Dingle (Mark Charnock) rescue Laurel. Ross later comes to Butler's Farm looking for Cain, after he is shot while carrying out a job that Cain had initially intended to undertake himself. Cain's wife, Moira Dingle (Natalie J. Robb) later recognises Ross as her marital nephew and she allows him to stay at the farm.

Ross generally seems to believe he is a ladies' man and his wandering eye irritates various people. Ross has sex with Charity Sharma (Emma Atkins), as she is intent on making estranged husband Jai Sharma (Chris Bisson) jealous. He is seen on occasions with a woman called Laura Atkinson (Farrel Hegarty), and Ross's lodger Debbie Dingle's (Charley Webb) daughter, Sarah (Sophia Amber Moore), becomes fond of her. Debbie tells Sarah she will probably never see Laura again.

Ross becomes close to Donna Windsor (Verity Rushworth), who he enjoys flirting with and teasing. He realises she is a dodgy policewoman and he agrees to help her burgle the house of Gary North, a prolific local criminal. However, Ross overhears Donna saying that she is only luring him into this position so she can arrest him, as she is fully aware of his previous crimes. But Donna convinces Ross that she was only saying it to keep things under wraps and they go ahead with the burglary. Later on Gary North attacks Ross' brother, Finn (Joe Gill), and nearly kills him. To keep his family safe, Ross agrees to do a dodgy job for Gary. Everything goes terribly wrong and the outcome of the job leads Donna to throw herself of a building while handcuffed to Gary, leading to their deaths. Ross is left devastated.

Ross and Debbie begin an affair after weeks of flirting, whilst she is engaged to his brother Pete (Anthony Quinlan). They plan to run away a few days before the wedding, however Cain stops them and announces he is the father of Debbie's half-brother, Moses. Debbie panics and breaks up with Ross after Cain adds that Ross made a deal with Charity to keep the paternity of Moses quiet if he broke up Cain and his wife, Moira. Ross tells Finn everything and he manages to get the letter Debbie had addressed to Pete, in which she confesses to the affair and planning to run away with Ross, before Pete can read it. Debbie and Pete still intend to get married.

On the wedding day, Cain ties Ross up and puts him into the back of a van, which he parks at the edge of a cliff. Ross escapes by jumping into water below and is unconscious for a while. When he wakes up, he goes back to the village to witness Cain and Pete putting a lifeless Debbie into the car as a result of a helicopter crash. He goes to the hospital and asks Pete whether Debbie is alive; Pete does not respond, worrying Ross. Ross goes back upstairs to see Debbie, but Pete sees him again and attacks him. Security guards throw them out of the hospital, but they continue to fight outside. After Ross punches Pete to the ground and goads him, Pete charges at Ross, causing him to hit his head on a stone wall. Pete keeps punching him, but stops when Ross is unresponsive. Instead of finding help for his dying brother, Pete places Ross into the boot of his car and drives to the woods, where he hides him a ditch and covers his body with leaves.

Three weeks later, Pete and James go to the woods to find the body of Ross, but it was nowhere to be seen. The pair return to inform Chas, Cain and Debbie that the body is gone and that they believe he is still alive. Unbeknownst to anybody, Ross is lying in a hospital bed but in a coma. The next day, Ross wakes up from the coma. The hospital thought that he was named Stephen having found a passport given to him by Cain. Ross tries to get out of talking to the police and leaves the hospital, returning home. He finds Pete and they argue about the events with Ross being angry that Pete had told everyone what he had done and not been reported to the police. He collapses when he tries to punch Pete and returns to the hospital where his parents and Finn were reunited with him. Ross shocked everyone when he forgives Pete for his actions but later kidnaps him and ties him to a bridge with the intention of making him look like he committed suicide.

The Barton family suffered further anguish in 2016 with the death of James, and again in 2017 with the deaths of Finn and Emma. Emma was murdered by Moira Barton, yet Pete and Ross decided not report her.

In 2018 Ross was a victim of an acid attack at the hands of Simon ordered by Debbie Dingle, however the attack was actually meant for Joe Tate and Debbie never ordered acid. Months later Ross caught Simon and was going to kill him but was stopped by Moira. Simon was later arrested for the attack along with Debbie but Ross forgave her for her part.

Ross left the village in November 2018 to live in Liverpool with Rebecca White and her son Seb.

== Reception ==
Parr was longlisted nominated for "Best Villain, "Sexiest Male", " and "Best Newcomer", respectively at the 2014 British Soap Awards but did not make the shortlist for the latter two categories In August 2017, Parr was longlisted for "Best Bad Boy" and "Sexiest Male" at the Inside Soap Awards. He made the viewer-voted shortlist for "Sexiest Male", but lost out to Davood Ghadami, who portrays Kush Kazemi in EastEnders. In April 2018, he was nominated for "Best Actor" at The British Soap Awards 2018. For his portrayal of Ross, Parr was nominated for Best Soap Actor (Male) at the 2018 Digital Spy Reader Awards; he came in sixth place with 8.5% of the total votes. Parr was also longlisted for "Best Comic Performance" at the 2025 Inside Soap Awards.

== See also ==
- List of soap opera villains
