= Donna Windsor =

Fictional character from Emmerdale

- Emmerdale character
- Verity Rushworth as Donna Windsor (2014)
- Portrayed by: Sophie Jeffery (1993–1997); Verity Rushworth (1998–2014)
- Duration: 1993–2009, 2014, 2024
- First appearance: 31 August 1993
- Last appearance: 5 December 2024
- Introduced by: Nicholas Prosser (1993); Mervyn Watson (1998); Kate Oates (2014)
In-universe information
- Occupation: Police officer
- Father: Vic Windsor
- Mother: Viv Hope
- Stepfather: Bob Hope
- Half-brothers: Scott Windsor; Heath Hope
- Half-sisters: Kelly Windsor; Cathy Hope
- Husband: Marlon Dingle (2006–2009)
- Daughters: April Windsor
- Granddaughters: Rebecca Windsor
- Aunts: Lucy
- Nephews: Elliot Windsor
- Nieces: Jean Tate

Donna Windsor (also Windsor-Dingle) is a fictional character from the British ITV soap opera Emmerdale. She was originally played by Sophie Jeffery until 1997. Actress Verity Rushworth took over the role in 1998. She made her first appearance in the show on 31 August 1993. Donna departed on 30 January 2009. At the time of her departure, Donna was the third longest running character on Emmerdale. It was announced on 8 January 2014 that Rushworth had decided to reprise her role as Donna for five months. She returned on 19 March 2014 and it was revealed that Donna was terminally ill with lung cancer. Donna died by suicide on 14 August 2014, after throwing herself and Gary North (Fergus O'Donnell) from a multi-storey car park to her death, but made her final appearance the following day, on 15 August 2014. In December 2024 Donna appears in a flashback sequence to Ross after April is abducted and taken to the carpark where her mum died. This leads to Ross revealing to April that Donna took her own life.

== Storylines ==
=== 1993–2009 ===
Donna arrives in the village in August 1993 with her family from London. She finds the move unpleasant at first. On 30 December 1993, the Windsors visit Kim Tate's (Claire King) stables to see the horses and Donna wanders off. When a plane crashes into the village, she has to be rescued when the stables catch fire as a result of being struck by falling wreckage.

In 1994, while being given a ride on tractor by Michael Feldmann (Matthew Vaughan), the vehicle topples and Donna is left injured. Her mother, Viv, threatens to sue Michael's boss Joe Sugden (Frazer Hines). The following year, Woolpack bar manager Terry Woods (Billy Hartman) gets into trouble with his boss Alan Turner (Richard Thorp) after Donna gets drunk with her half siblings Scott and Kelly. One evening when her father Vic attempts to take a bb gun from Scott, Donna is shot in the head as a result but is only left with a scratch. When the knowledge of Viv's affair with Terry becomes common knowledge, Donna feels torn between her parents and she and Viv move into the pub with Terry but return when Vic and Viv reunite.

Donna is upset when Kelly runs away with her teacher Tom Bainbridge (Jeremy Turner-Welch) and more trouble comes when Andy Hopwood (Kelvin Fletcher) leads Donna astray and persuades her to bunk off school and go joyriding in Leeds with Robert Sugden (Christopher Smith) and himself. A feud between the Windsors and Sugdens ignites as a result. Donna and her school friend Chelsea Campbell (Elizabeth Ingram) begin bullying Andy at school, culminating in Robert, now Andy's adoptive brother, punching Donna in the face. Donna tries to blame Robert for the bullying but is unsuccessful. Chelsea is expelled and sent to a special needs school and Donna is warned if caught bullying again, she would suffer the same fate as Chelsea. When Vic is killed by Andy's father Billy (David Crellin), in a robbery at the post office on Christmas Day 1998, Donna is devastated and feels guilty as she had known Billy had been in the village and believes she could have prevented her father's death. Andy runs away from home in the aftermath and Donna enlists Kelly's help to track him down and convinces him to come home.

Donna begins a relationship with Marc Reynolds (Anthony Lewis) and subsequently loses her virginity. Viv catches Donna in bed with Marc and shortly afterwards, they split after Viv tells Marc's mother Angie (Freya Copeland) about them sleeping together. Later, Donna is upset to learn Marc is now seeing Eve Birch (Raine Davison). Donna, Marc and their friends are later involved in a hit and run accident in which leaves their headmistress, Jean Strickland dead. Marc is jailed for two years for causing death by dangerous driving while Donna is sentenced to community service.

When Viv remarries nearly three years after Vic's death, Donna has reservations about her new stepfather, Bob Hope (Tony Audenshaw) but soon warms to him and they become close. Donna is upset when Viv and Bob separate in 2003 and in a desperate cry for help, she takes an overdose which shocks Bob and Viv into reconciliation. Donna later begins a relationship with Robert (now Karl Davies), who believes it is just a casual fling but Donna feels more serious about it until Robert dumps her for Elaine Marsden (Samantha McCarthy). They reunite when the Marsdens leave the village but it does not last as Robert pursues Katie Addyman (Sammy Winward) behind Donna's back. Donna contracts chlamydia from with Robert, which causes him distress as he has the condition too. By this time, Robert and Katie are secretly seeing each other, despite her being engaged to Andy. When the affair is revealed, Donna feels deeply betrayed and ends her friendship with Katie. However they reconcile when Robert cheats on Katie with Sadie King (Patsy Kensit) and find a common enemy in Robert.

Donna forms an attraction to widower Marlon Dingle (Mark Charnock) but he is not interested in pursuing a relationship and she dates Danny Daggert (Cleveland Campbell) instead. However, The relationship does not last long and they both agree to a mutual break-up. Donna begins getting close to Marlon again and they begin a relationship. After a year together, Marlon proposes, much, to the surprise of Donna, who accepts. They plan their wedding but they are overshadowed when Viv insists they have a double wedding as she and Bob are remarrying. Prior to the wedding, Donna strikes up a close friendship with Max King (Charlie Kemp), whom she enjoys flirting with. When Max is killed in a car crash, caused by Robert, Donna is devastated and Marlon tries to help her through her grief. She keeps a recording of Max's voice on her phone which she regularly listens to. On the morning of the wedding, Donna confesses she has feelings for Max. After some soul-searching, Marlon decides to forgive Donna and they marry along with Viv and Bob.

Desperate to get their foot on the property ladder, the couple enter a competition to win the new show home on the King’s River development. They are successful and are delighted but shocked to discover they need a £10,000 deposit to clinch the prize. Viv, however, offers to help as she and Bob are desperate to have a baby and Viv asked Donna to be a surrogate mother and she would give them the deposit. A hesitant Donna agrees, knowing it is the only way she can get her own home, and eventually convinces Marlon. However, Marlon and Donna's house explodes on the day of the grand opening in July 2006 as a result of a gas leak. Three people are killed in the explosion and the body of murder victim Terence Turner (Nick Brimble) is discovered buried under the rubble at the site. Now homeless and discovering Viv was pregnant with twins, Donna returns her money, which she receives from Tom King (Ken Farrington) as compensation. Donna and Marlon face more problems when they are left looking after Marlon's cousin Lillith's (Amanda Hennessy) four children Luke, Matthew, Mark and Jon, following her arrest for armed robbery. Marlon decides the children should live with their paternal uncle as the current living arrangements are unsuitable. The children run away after being unhappy with their uncle and Social Services insist the children return to their uncle. After a failed escape attempt with the children, Donna and Marlon are arrested and the kids are put in foster care. They then make a formal application for guardianship but Lilith returns and the case against her collapses and she takes the children to Ireland with her.

Donna later joins the police force which, draws ire from her in-laws, the Dingles but Marlon supports her. Shane Doyle (Paul McEwan), Donna's colleague on the force, begins bullying her for her gender as well as her in-laws and their criminal records. Everyone Donna knows, including Marlon, likes Shane and enjoys being in his company, leading Donna to doubt her instincts. During a party at the Woolpack, Donna decides to make a fresh start with Shane. He misunderstands what she wanted, thinking she is attracted to him and kisses her. When he begins to force himself on her, Donna knees him in the groin and flees to her colleague Ross Kirk's (Samuel Anderson) house. Ross had witnessed the assault. Donna plans to file a complaint but Shane, had guessed that she would do so and before she can, he tells Superintendent Charles Vaughan (Richard Cole) Donna had made a pass at him and is going through a crisis in her marriage. Vaughan tells Donna to wait before making any decisions as it could harm her career. To Donna's anger, Ross does not back her up, meaning it is her word against Shane's.

When Viv is arrested for fraud after being framed by conman Freddie Yorke (Keith Woodason), Donna and Ross pursue him but Donna loses control of the car and they crash. Ross saves her and they are rushed to hospital. Donna undergoes spinal surgery and a splenectomy as her spleen had ruptured on impact. Donna is left immobile for a while, but regains the feeling in her legs. Donna is devastated when Viv pleads guilty to the charges and is sentenced to three years imprisonment.

After Ross reveals his feelings for Donna, they begin an affair but Shane, and later Ross's cousin Paddy Kirk (Dominic Brunt) find out about it. Ross accepts a transfer in London but returns when Shane's body is pulled from the lake. Donna, afraid Marlon will find out from the investigation into Shane's murder, confesses to the affair. An angry Marlon then implicates Ross as Shane's killer. Donna and Marlon separate briefly but reunite on the condition that Donna never sees Ross again. Donna, however, visits him in prison and Ross told her of his suspicions that Jasmine Thomas (Jenna-Louise Coleman), Debbie Dingle (Charley Webb) and Marlon's brother, Eli (Joseph Gilgun) had been acting suspiciously the night Shane went missing. Donna helps proves Ross's innocence by implicating Eli as a potential suspect for the murder and after he is arrested he implicates Debbie and Jasmine who go on the run and Ross is released from custody. But Marlon is unable to forgive Donna for her betrayal and for going to see Ross behind his back and shopping his brother to the police. He ends her marriage and throws her out and she moves in with Katie. Following Ross' departure, Donna applies for a transfer to Essex and Katie tries to convince her to stay but Donna is adamant that she needs a fresh start. She then leaves the village in a taxi for the train station.

=== 2014 ===
Donna returns to the village with her four-year-old daughter, April (Amelia Flanagan), moving in with Bob and Brenda Walker (Lesley Dunlop). The following day, April is nearly run over by Adam Barton (Adam Thomas), while on his quad bike, but she is saved by Marlon. He is then stunned to see Donna back in Emmerdale and when he confronts her, she reveals that he is the father of April. Marlon eventually warms to his daughter, and as Donna and April are leaving the village in Bob's car, Marlon stands in front them, causing Donna to hit her head on the windscreen, as Bob makes an emergency stop. Bob takes Donna to hospital, and as he sits in the waiting room, Donna reveals to a nurse that she has terminal mesothelioma, but does not want any one else to know. During a hospital appointment, Donna is told that her cancer is more aggressive than they anticipated and only has six months to a year left to live. Donna finds a confident in Rhona Goskirk (Zoe Henry), who persuades her to tell Marlon about her illness, but Donna tells her that she wants to tell him when the time is right and that she wants Marlon's relationship with April to grow organically and naturally, not over her illness. Following recent events, Donna and April move in with Rhona and her husband, Paddy (Dominic Brunt). Donna later flirts with Ross Barton (Michael Parr) at Cain Dingle (Jeff Hordley) and Moira Barton's (Natalie J. Robb) wedding. Donna decides to turn to crime, in order to raise more money to leave behind for April and Ross helps Donna burgle a jewellery store, belonging to a local criminal, but Ross is confronted by the property owner, an old aged pensioner, who Ross attacks and he is hospitalised. Donna decides to leave the village, alongside April, but later returns when the store owner makes a full recovery and is unable to identify his attacker.

Ross and Donna enter a sexual relationship, but Donna insists they keep it a secret. Marlon eventually realises that Donna is dying and confronts her, to which she reveals that she has lung cancer and only has months left to live, devastating Marlon. He informs his fiance, Laurel (Charlotte Bellamy), of Donna's condition, but she feels uncomfortable, however, after Marlon decides to bring their wedding day forward, in order for Donna to be able to attend, before she dies. Ross and Donna are eventually tracked down by Gary North (Fergus O'Donnell), the owner of the jewellery store that they burgled. Gary threatens Donna, demanding that she end her relationship with Ross, otherwise he will hurt April; Donna obeys Gary's demand, devastating Ross. Donna later collapses in Paddy and Rhona's kitchen, which confuses April, and Marlon accompanies Donna to a hospital appointment, where they are told that her cancer has spread and that she is now into stage-four and that her life expectancy is a matter of weeks. This devastates Donna, who shares a grief-stricken kiss with Marlon. Marlon eventually tells Paddy about the kiss and Paddy tells Donna to give Marlon space. Donna later visits Ross, as she has been worrying about him and she is stunned to find that he has obtained a gun, in order to carry out a job for Gary, who is blackmailing him and threatening to hurt his family. Ross and Donna rekindle their relationship, after Donna agrees to help Ross fulfil his final job for Gary.

Gary's final job for Ross is to retrieve photographs of him from a nightclub owned by another criminal, Stephen Banks. After obtaining a police uniform for Ross in order for him to pretend to be a police officer, he and Donna enter the nightclub with a search warrant. When the club manageress refuses to open the safe containing the photographs, Donna becomes aggressive with her, threatening her with her ASP. When Stephen arrives having been warned by one of his heavies, he opens the safe, and Donna takes the money and photographs inside. Ross gives himself away when he is unable to work his police radio and Stephen becomes suspicious. Realising that Ross is not a police officer and that Donna is corrupt and working for Gary, Stephen beats Ross up, forcing Donna to watch. As the situation escalates, Adam, Ross' half-brother who was acting as a lookout for them, crashes his car into Stephen's outside the club to create a diversion. This enables Donna and Ross to escape but they are unable to retrieve the photos. As they drive off, Donna ends her relationship with Ross but does not tell him about her illness, claiming that she does not love him and was just using him. She explains that she intends to report Gary for his crimes. Ross is heartbroken and brands Donna a "cold bitch". He drops Donna off at a multi-storey car park where she had agreed to meet Gary and she goes to face him alone. After revealing that she doesn't have the pictures, she threatens Gary with a taser gun, but Gary has a sniper as back-up and they are prepared to shoot Donna. Gary threatens to harm April again, and she puts the taser away, seemingly defeated. Ross then arrives having changed his mind and wanting to help her. Donna admits that she lied and tells Ross that she loves him. Donna then handcuffs herself to Gary and throws them both off the rooftop to their deaths. Donna's funeral takes place on 28 August 2014 and she is buried next to her father, Vic, in the village churchyard.

== Creation and casting ==
The character was introduced as part of the new Windsor family in 1993, by series producer Nicholas Prosser. Prosser cast Sophie Jeffery in the role. Donna is the only daughter of Viv (Deena Payne) and Vic Windsor (Alun Lewis). Donna was a little spoilt as a young child, often getting her own way but she was not as devious as her half-sister Kelly (Adele Silva), or as wild as half-brother Scott (Toby Cockerell; Ben Freeman). In 1998, series producer Mervyn Watson recast the role to Verity Rushworth.

== Development ==
=== Departure (2009) ===
On 8 April 2008, it was reported that Emmerdale actors were heading for the exit after new boss Anita Turner took over. The report also stated that Verity Rushworth, who plays Donna Windsor-Dingle, had told show bosses she wants a break after nearly eleven years on the soap, along with Jenna-Louise Coleman is also reported to be eager to leave her role as Jasmine Thomas. An insider told The Sun: "Both stars are contracted until December but they've warned bosses they don’t see themselves staying. Their final scenes will air early next year." A spokesperson for Emmerdale responded: "Verity and Jenna both expressed an interest last year in taking a break. Nothing will be confirmed until we begin contract negotiations for 2009.".

Both actresses told former series producer Kathleen Beedles separately last year that they would like to take a break from the soap. .". It was reported on 20 April that Emmerdale producers were hoping to dissuade Verity Rushworth from taking an extended break from the show. An official statement from the soap earlier this month confirmed that the actress, who plays Donna Windsor-Dingle, may decide to take time off when her contract expires. "Verity has been playing Donna for more than ten years so she's thinking about taking an extended break," an insider told the Daily Star Sunday. "It's only something that she's thinking about. No decision has been made yet." She's got some really exciting stuff coming and her contract doesn't run out until the end of the year, so there's still time to persuade her to stay. She'd be a huge loss..".

=== Return (2014) ===
It was announced on 8 January 2014 that Rushworth would reprise her role as Donna, making her return in March. In an interview published by Digital Spy on 11 March 2014, Rushworth confirmed that she be appearing for five months and would depart again once the storyline has reached its conclusion. It was later revealed that Donna was terminally ill. She departed from Emmerdale for the final time on 15 August 2014.

== Reception ==
The scene in which Donna filmed her emotional goodbye to April on a video camera was awarded "Spectacular Scene of the Year" at the 2015 British Soap Awards. Rushworth was also nominated for "Best Actress", but lost out to rival soap EastEnders actress Kellie Bright, who plays Linda Carter in the serial. Donna's cancer and suicide was also nominated for "Best Storyline" under the title of "Donna's Demise", however the highly-publicised Who Killed Lucy Beale? story from EastEnders won the award. Also, Rushworth was nominated for "Best On-screen Partnership" alongside Michael Parr, who plays Ross. They again lost to EastEnders' Adam Woodyatt and Laurie Brett, who play Ian and Jane Beale.
