= Michael Parr =

English actor (born 1986)

- Born: 6 August 1986 (age 40); St Helens, Merseyside, England
- Education: East 15 Acting School
- Occupation: Actor
- Years active: 2008–present
- Children: 1

Michael Parr (born 6 August 1986) is an English actor. He is known for his role as Ross Barton in the ITV soap opera Emmerdale. He initially appeared in the soap from 2013 to 2018, returning in 2024.

== Early life ==
Parr was born in St Helens, Merseyside. His mother is American and he holds dual U.S. and British nationality, enabling him to work in the U.S. without the need of a Green Card if he wished. He trained at the Elizabeth Hill School of Dance and Drama in St Helens and the East 15 Acting School in Essex, graduating in 2008.

Prior to being cast in Emmerdale, Parr worked between acting jobs as a learning support assistant in a special educational needs school. He also worked as a barman. In September 2025, Parr had his first child, a daughter, with girlfriend Isabelle Du Plessis.

== Career ==
Parr made his first appearance in the ITV soap opera Emmerdale in July 2013, playing an unnamed man who carjacked regular character Laurel Thomas (Charlotte Bellamy). It was only after his return to the show in October 2013 that his true identity was revealed. His character, Ross Barton, is one of three sons of James Barton (Bill Ward), as well as the nephew of Moira Barton (Natalie J Robb). During his first stint in Emmerdale, Parr was involved in a number of high-profile storylines, including an affair with policewoman Donna Windsor (Verity Rushworth); taking part in a violent robbery at Home Farm; an illicit affair with his brother's fiancée (later wife), Debbie Dingle (Charley Webb); and secretly fathering a child with Debbie's mother Charity Macey (Emma Atkins). In 2018, Ross Barton was the victim of an acid attack, leaving the character badly scarred. Parr described the storyline as challenging.

In October 2015, Parr won awards for Best Actor, Best Bad Boy and Sexiest Male at the 2015 Inside Soap Awards. In early 2018, it was announced that Parr would be leaving Emmerdale later that year. Parr has also appeared on stage in various roles, including Justin in Studies for A Portrait at the Oval House Theatre and Danny in Twothousandandsex at the Drill Hall in London. In September 2023, Parr appeared as Paul Hughes in the ITV1 drama The Long Shadow, alongside Katherine Kelly.

In September 2024, Emmerdale confirmed that Parr would return to the role of Ross later that year, following a six-year absence.

== Filmography ==
=== Film ===
Year	Title	Role	Notes
2009	No Way Through	Soldier	
2011	Queensbury Rules	Liam	
2011	A Beautiful Impurity	Gobba	
2013	Brothers in Arms	Chris	
2014	Territory	Keiren	
2016	Cain Hill	Arnie	
2017	Dark Ascension	'G'	
2019	The Eighty Fourth	Narrator	
2021	Our Home	Adam Wood	
2021	Mister Mayfair: Serena's Game	Lister	
2023	Ocean Deep	Adrian	
2025	Single People at the End of the World	Mike	

=== Television ===
Year	Title	Role	Notes
2011	Inside Men	PC Mayfair	1 episode
2012	Doctors	Kyle West	Episode: "Echo Chamber"
2012	Good Cop	Adam Riley	1 episode
2012	Casualty	Mark Satchmore	Episode: "The Kindness of Strangers"
2012	Hollyoaks	Billy Parker	1 episode
2013–2018, 2024–present	Emmerdale	Ross Barton	Regular role
2020	Bulletproof	Ben Woodall	1 episode
2022	Colosseum	Senator Olybruis	Episode: "The Pagan"
2023	The Long Shadow	Paul Hughes	1 episode
2024	Douglas Is Cancelled	Sebastian	1 episode
