= Joe Gill (actor) =

English actor

- Born: Joseph Peter Gill; 12 February 1994 (age 31); Manchester, England
- Occupation: Actor
- Years active: 2013–present
- Television: Emmerdale (2013–2017)

Joe Gill (born 12 February 1994) is a British actor. On television, he played Finn Barton in the ITV soap opera Emmerdale (2013–2017). He starred in the film Treading Water (2024) and is also known for his theatre work.

== Early life ==
Gill took Acting at Pendleton College in Salford.

== Career ==
Gill made his acting debut during an episode on Casualty as Moxy Price in the episode titled "What You Believe" in August 2013. Gill made his first screen appearance in Emmerdale on 6 December 2013. The character and casting was announced on 5 November 2013. Of his casting, Gill said, "I'm very grateful to be given this opportunity. The cast and crew have been class with me so far and the fact I'm able to learn from these experienced professionals everyday is just brilliant. I'm hoping my character can contribute to how amazing the show is doing at the moment." Gill later left Emmerdale in late 2017 when his character was killed off unexpectedly, although the storyline had been in the works for the better part of a year.

During the course of 2018 and 2019, Gill performed in The Full Monty on stage with Gary Lucy, Kai Owen, Andrew Dunn, James Redmond and Louis Emerick. He portrayed 'Lomper'.

Gill made his feature film debut with a starring role in the 2024 drama film Treading Water, which premiered at the BFI London Film Festival.

== Filmography ==
=== Television ===
| Year | Title | Role | Notes |
|---|---|---|---|
| 2013 | Casualty | Moxy Price | Episode: What You Believe (series 28) |
| 2013–2017 | Emmerdale | Finn Barton | Series regular |
| 2014 | In the Flesh | Al Dudgen | Series 2, Episode 1 |
