= Bill Ward (actor) =

English actor

- Born: 1967 (age 58–59); Newcastle upon Tyne, England
- Education: Bristol University
- Occupation: Actor
- Years active: 1984–present
- Known for: Coronation Street; Emmerdale

Bill Ward (born 1967) is an English actor. He is known for his soap opera performances, playing Charlie Stubbs in Coronation Street (2003–2007) and James Barton in Emmerdale (2013–2017). His stage work includes West End roles in Spamalot (2007), Viva Forever! (2012), Million Dollar Quartet (2016), and Everybody's Talking About Jamie (2019), as well as national tours of Shakespeare in Love, Legally Blonde (both 2017–2018), and The Full Monty (2023–2024). Outside acting, Ward is a noted photographer.

== Early life ==
Ward was educated at Oundle School and then Bristol University, where he obtained a degree in Modern British History. He worked as an advertising executive before beginning his professional acting career.

== Career ==
Having already worked extensively in theatre, Ward joined the cast of the long-running ITV soap opera Coronation Street in 2003, portraying local builder and serial womaniser Charlie Stubbs. His character was involved in two major coercive abuse storylines: first involving his fiancé Shelley Unwin, and later his girlfriend Tracy Barlow. To ensure authenticity, Ward worked closely with the charity Women's Aid during this period, becoming an ambassador for them. Stubbs was subsequently murdered by Barlow, with Ward departing the show in January 2007.

Ward's second regular soap role was that of charismatic farmer James Barton in Emmerdale, beginning in 2013. After announcing three years later that he had quit the series, Ward's character was killed off—dying in a car crash; an elaborate stunt filmed at Pinewood Studios—in October 2016. His other television credits include guest-starring roles in Jonathan Creek, Footballers' Wives, EastEnders, The Bill, Holby City, Midsomer Murders, Heartbeat, Casualty, Silent Witness, After Life, Vera, and Doctors.

Following national theatre tours of Shakespeare in Love and Legally Blonde between 2018 and 2019, Ward played retired drag queen Hugo Battersby (aka Loco Chanelle) in the musical Everybody's Talking About Jamie, from July to September 2019 at the Apollo Theatre. It was revealed the following year that Ward had briefly undertaken work as a delivery driver for Tesco—alongside teaching film and drama students—after several acting jobs he had scheduled were cancelled due to the COVID-19 pandemic. Next, he appeared in a 29-date tour of the musical The Full Monty (2023–2024), receiving strong reviews for his portrayal of Gerald, and headlined Jack and the Beanstalk at Bridlington Spa from December 2024 to January 2025.

== Filmography ==
=== Film ===
| Year | Title | Role | Notes | Ref. |
|---|---|---|---|---|
| 2000 | Scent of Burning Mortar | Jeremiah | Short film | |
| 2000 | Adam & Steve | Adam | Short film | |
| 2011 | The Great Ghost Rescue | Lord Alfred Seymour | | |
| 2014 | Nothing More | Unknown | Short film | |
| 2015 | A Dark Reflection | Terry | | |
| 2015 | The Haunting of Ellie Rose | Frank | | |
| 2023 | To a Cinder | Gustav | | |

=== Television ===
| Year | Title | Role | Notes | Ref. |
|---|---|---|---|---|
| 2001 | Jonathan Creek | Vernon Spools | Episode: "Satan's Chimney" | |
| 2002 | In Deep | Policeman | 2 episodes | |
| 2002 | Footballers' Wives | Mike Grainger | 2 episodes | |
| 2002 | Rose and Maloney | Mikey | Episode: "Pilot: Part 1" | |
| 2003 | EastEnders | Mike Parker | Episode #1.2447 | |
| 2003 | The Bill | Charlie Phillips | 2 episodes | |
| 2003 | Holby City | Patrick Sanders | Episode: "House of Cards" | |
| 2003–2007 | Coronation Street | Charlie Stubbs | Series regular; 421 episodes | |
| 2004 | Fallen | Sykes | Television film | |
| 2007 | Cold Blood | Paul Attwell | Episode: "Dead and Buried" | |
| 2008 | Midsomer Murders | Sam Nelms | Episode: "Talking to the Dead" | |
| 2008 | Heartbeat | Mad Dan Neeley | Episode: "It Came from Outer Space" | |
| 2008 | The Bill | Rob Towler | Recurring; 4 episodes | |
| 2009 | Robin Hood | Rufus | Episode: "Sins of the Father" | |
| 2009 | Doctors | Larry Bryan | Episode: "The Romantics" | |
| 2009 | Everything But the Ball | Geoff | Main cast; pilot | |
| 2010 | Tangled | Nick Hobbes | Main cast; pilot | |
| 2012 | Casualty | Vaughan Morrison | Episode: "Zero Sum Game" | |
| 2012 | Crime Stories | Carl Thompson | Episode #1.6 | |
| 2012 | Doctors | Reverend Roderick McAllister | Episode: "Blood Upon the Rose" | |
| 2013 | Silent Witness | Hearns | 2 episodes | |
| 2013–2017 | Emmerdale | James Barton | Series regular; 341 episodes | |
| 2020 | After Life | Simon | Recurring; 3 episodes | |
| 2021 | Natural History Museum: World of Wonder | Narrator (voice) | Documentary; 4 episodes | |
| 2021 | Before We Die | DI Sean Hardacre | Recurring; 3 episodes | |
| 2021 | Casualty | Mike Sartwell | Episode #35.26 | |
| 2022 | Vera | Peter Henson | Episode: "Tyger Tyger" | |
| 2023 | The Hunt for Raoul Moat | Mike Anderson | Miniseries; 2 episodes | |
| 2023 | Doctors | Mickey Gilmore | Episode: "Out in the Cold" | |
| 2026 | A Knight of the Seven Kingdoms | Ser Donnel of Duskendale | 3 episodes | |

== Theatre ==
Selected credits
| Year | Title | Role | Notes | Ref. |
|---|---|---|---|---|
| 2002 | Antigone | The Messenger | Bristol Old Vic | |
| 2002 | The Beggar's Opera | Ben Budge | Bristol Old Vic | |
| 2002 | A Chorus of Disapproval | Guy Jones | Bristol Old Vic | |
| 2003 | Oh, What a Lovely War! | Drill Sergeant | Theatr Clwyd | |
| 2007 | Not Dead Enough | DS Roy Grace | UK tour | |
| 2007 | Spamalot | Mortimer | Palace Theatre | |
| 2008 | Edward II | Mortimer | Battersea Arts Centre | |
| 2009 | Look Back in Anger | Jimmy Porter | UK tour | |
| 2010 | The Tempest | Prospero | Guildford Shakespeare Company | |
| 2010 | The Lady from the Sea | The Stranger | Royal Exchange | |
| 2012 | The Hairy Ape | Yank | Southwark Playhouse | |
| 2012 | Viva Forever! | Jonny | Piccadilly Theatre | |
| 2016 | Million Dollar Quartet | Sam Phillips | Noël Coward Theatre | |
| 2017–2018 | Legally Blonde | Professor Callahan | UK tour | |
| 2017–2018 | Shakespeare in Love | Lord Wessex | UK tour | |
| 2019 | Everybody's Talking About Jamie | Hugo/Loco Chanelle | Apollo Theatre | |
| 2020 | The Glee Club | Bant | UK tour | |
| 2021 | The Legend of Sleepy Hollow | Baltus Van Tassel | UK tour | |
| 2022 | Are You As Nervous As I Am? | Bob Parr | Greenwich Theatre | |
| 2023 | The Book of Will | Henry Condell | UK tour | |
| 2023–2024 | The Full Monty | Gerald | UK tour | |
| 2024 | Gerry & Sewell | Mr McCarten | Theatre Royal | |
| 2024–2025 | Jack and the Beanstalk | Fleshcreep | Bridlington Spa | |
| 2025 | The Winter's Tale | Polixenes/Lord Sicilia | Tobacco Factory Theatre | |
| 2025 | The Shawshank Redemption | Stammas | UK tour | |
