= Lucy Pargeter =

English actress

- Born: 1 March 1977 (age 49); Nottingham, England
- Occupation: Actress
- Years active: 1995–present
- Known for: Crossroads; Emmerdale
- Children: 3

Lucy Kate Pargeter (born 1 March 1977) is an English actress, known for her roles as Helen Raven in Crossroads (2002–2003) and Chas Dingle in Emmerdale (2002–present). She also finished third in the 13th series of the ITV reality show I'm a Celebrity...Get Me Out of Here! in 2013. For her role in Emmerdale, she won the 2019 British Soap Award for Best Actress.

== Early life ==
Pargeter was born in Nottingham. She trained at the Central Junior Television Workshop and New College, Nottingham. She was a member of the band Paperdolls, which toured with Boyzone in the 1990s and had a number 65 chart single with "Gonna Make You Blush". She also took part in Stars in Their Eyes as Emma Bunton.

== Career ==
Her first acting role was in the TV Movie "The Bare Necessities" in 1996 where she appeared with future Emmerdale co-star William Ash. She has appeared in Soldier Soldier, Dalziel and Pascoe, and played the role of Brenda in the film Anita and Me. However, it is for her roles as Helen Raven in Crossroads (2002–2003) and Chas Dingle, whom she currently plays in the long-running soap Emmerdale (2002–present), that she is best known. In January 2006, she appeared in the reality singing competition Soapstar Superstar and finished in third place. In 2007, the Irish channel TV3 hosted the TV Now magazine awards, in which Pargeter and fellow Emmerdale actor Tom Lister won Best Couple for their portrayal of Chas and Carl. In 2011, she appeared on a celebrity edition of Who Wants to Be a Millionaire?, with her Emmerdale co-star Danny Miller.

In November 2013, Pargeter entered the thirteenth series of I'm a Celebrity...Get Me Out of Here!, where she finished in third place. In December 2017, she appeared in a celebrity edition of The Chase, and won £5,000, out of the £15,000, for her selected charity, “Safe at Last”.

In June 2019, Pargeter won the Best Actress award at The British Soap Awards; she was also nominated for Best Female Dramatic Performance and Best On-Screen Partnership, alongside Dominic Brunt.

== Personal life ==
Pargeter has three daughters with her former partner, Rudi Coleano. She took maternity leave from Emmerdale in 2005 to have her first child, and another in 2017 to have twins. Coleano and Pargeter's relationship ended in 2019. She owns three English bulldogs: Bert, Lenny, and Pearl.

Pargeter was a bridesmaid at the wedding of her Emmerdale co-stars Charley Webb and Matthew Wolfenden.

== Awards and nominations ==
Year	Award	Category	Series	Result	Ref.
2011	All About Soap Awards	Best Actress	Emmerdale	Nominated	
2011	All About Soap Awards	Best Love Triangle (with Tom Lister and Suzanne Shaw)	Emmerdale	Nominated	
2011	TV Choice Awards	Best Soap Actress	Emmerdale	Longlisted	
2012	National Television Awards	Outstanding Serial Drama Performance	Emmerdale	Longlisted	
2013	National Television Awards	Outstanding Serial Drama Performance	Emmerdale	Longlisted	
2013	All About Soap Awards	Best Reveal	Emmerdale	Nominated	
2016	TV Choice Awards	Best Soap Actress	Emmerdale	Nominated	
2019	National Television Awards	Serial Drama Performance	Emmerdale	Shortlisted	
2022	National Television Awards	Serial Drama Performance	Emmerdale	Longlisted	
2023	National Television Awards	Serial Drama Performance	Emmerdale	Longlisted	
2023	TRIC Awards	Soap Actor of the Year	Emmerdale	Longlisted	
2024	National Television Awards	Serial Drama Performance	Emmerdale	Longlisted	
