= Anthony Quinlan =

English actor (b. 1984)

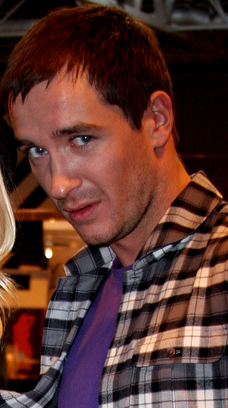
- Quinlan in 2009
- Born: 14 April 1984 (age 42); Salford, England, United Kingdom
- Occupation: Actor
- Years active: 2005–present
- Television: Hollyoaks (2005–2011); Emmerdale (2013–2020)
- Partner(s): Dianne Buswell (2017–2018); Nikki Sanderson (2022–present)
- Children: 1

Anthony Quinlan (born 16 October 1984) is a British actor from Salford, England, known for his roles as Gilly Roach in the Channel 4 soap opera Hollyoaks and Pete Barton in the ITV soap opera Emmerdale.

== Career ==
Quinlan played Gilly Roach in the Channel 4 soap opera Hollyoaks. He was nominated for the 2010 Inside Soap Awards" for Sexiest Male". He was nominated for the 2011 National Television Awards for "Best Serial Drama Performance"; that same year, he was nominated for the British Soap Award for "Best Actor".

On 5 November 2013, it was announced that Quinlan had joined the cast of Emmerdale as Pete Barton. On 30 November 2019, Quinlan quit the soap and left in 2020.

== Personal life ==
From 2017 to 2018, Quinlan was in a relationship with Strictly Come Dancing professional dancer, Dianne Buswell. Since January 2022, Quinlan has been in a relationship with Hollyoaks and Coronation Street actress, Nikki Sanderson.

== Filmography ==
Year	Title	Role	Notes
2005–2011	Hollyoaks	Gilly Roach	Regular role, 402 episodes
2009	Hollyoaks: The Morning After The Night Before	Gilly Roach	Regular role, 402 episodes
2009	Hollyoaks Later	Gilly Roach	Recurring Role
2009	T4 on the Beach	Himself	Guest
2010	Derren Brown Investigates	Himself	
2013	Doctors	Carl Scagell	Recurring Role
2013–2020	Emmerdale	Pete Barton	Regular role, 716 episodes
2017	Jessica Frost	Cutter	Pre-production
2025	Gods Of Salford	Zeus	Theatre production
2026	Time	Steve	Season 3

== Awards and nominations ==
Year	Award	Category	Work	Result	Ref.
2010	Inside Soap Awards	Sexiest Male	Hollyoaks	Nominated	
2011	16th National Television Awards	Serial Drama Performance	Hollyoaks	Nominated	
2011	The British Soap Awards	Best Actor	Hollyoaks	Nominated	
2011	TV Choice Awards	Best Soap Actor	Hollyoaks	Nominated	
2011	Inside Soap Awards	Best Wedding (shared with Carley Stenson)	Hollyoaks	Shortlisted	
2014	The British Soap Awards	Sexiest Male	Emmerdale	Nominated	
2014	Inside Soap Awards	Best Newcomer	Emmerdale	Nominated	
