= Charley Webb =

English actress (born 1988)

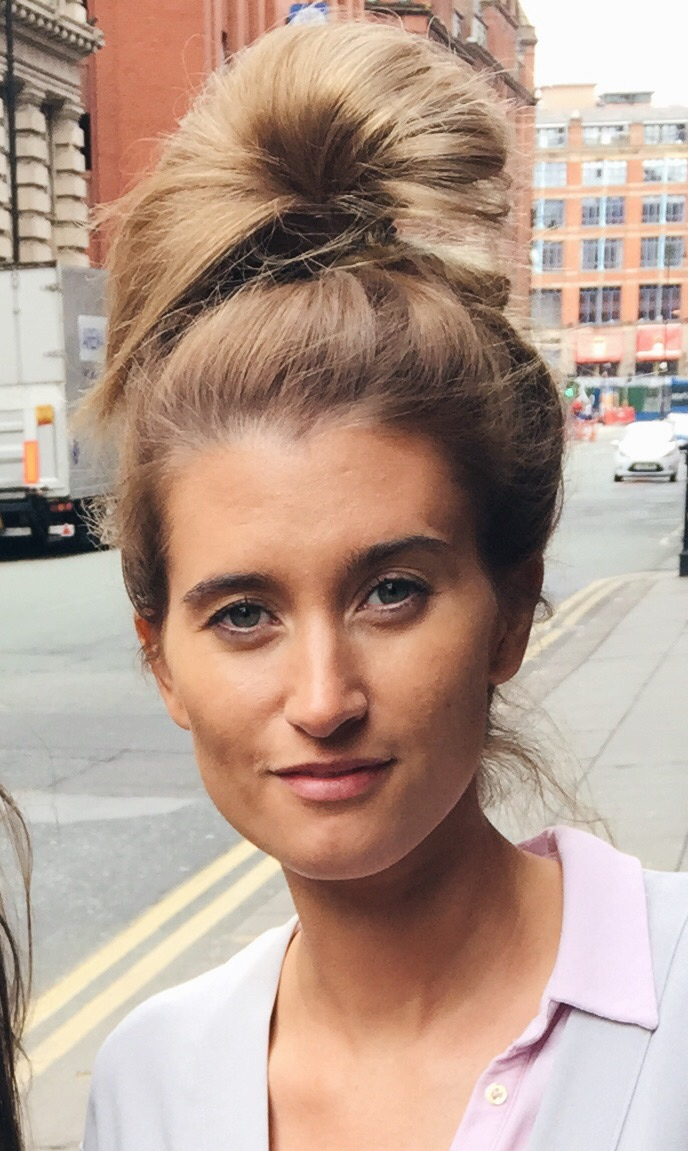
- Born: Charlene Joanne Webb; 26 February 1988 (age 38); Bury, Greater Manchester, England
- Occupation: Actress
- Years active: 2000–present
- Known for: Role of Debbie Dingle in Emmerdale
- Spouse: Matthew Wolfenden (m. 2018; sep. 2023)
- Children: 3
- Relatives: Jamie Lomas (brother); Kym Marsh (former sister-in-law)

Charlene Joanne Webb (born 26 February 1988), commonly known as Charley Webb, is an English actress. From 2002 to 2021, she played Debbie Dingle in the ITV soap opera Emmerdale. In 2014, she was nominated for Best Female Dramatic Performance at the British Soap Awards.

== Career ==
Before landing the role of Debbie, Webb previously appeared on the stage in Manchester in a production of Bugsy Malone when she was eight. She joined the soap opera Emmerdale in 2002 at the age of 14. She was nominated for Best Actress at the 2009 British Soap Awards and was also nominated for Sexiest Female at the 2010 British Soap Awards. In 2021, Webb announced that she had made the decision to leave Emmerdale after 19 years.

== Personal life ==
Webb attended Philips High School in Whitefield, Greater Manchester. She has two older sisters, and her older brother Jamie Lomas is an actor, known for playing Warren Fox in the Channel 4 soap opera, Hollyoaks. In September 2009, Webb and Emmerdale co-star Matthew Wolfenden announced that they were expecting their first child, due in spring 2010. Webb gave birth to a boy in April 2010. They announced in June 2015 that were having a second child, giving birth to another son on 19 December 2015. In February 2018, Webb and Wolfenden married; their co-star, Lucy Pargeter, was a bridesmaid. Webb announced her third pregnancy in February 2019, giving birth to a third son on 26 July 2019. In November 2023, they announced that they had separated.

In November 2025, Webb revealed that she has been initially diagnosed with both Attention deficit hyperactivity disorder (ADHD) and Autism.

== Filmography ==
=== Television ===
Year	Title	Role	Notes
2002–2021	Emmerdale	Debbie Jones/Dingle	Series regular. 1821 episodes
2006	The Royal	Kathy Carberry	Series 5; Episode 9: "Winners & Losers". Uncredited role
2012	All Star Mr & Mrs	Herself - Contestant	Series 4; Episode 9
2014	Text Santa 2014	Debbie Dingle	Television Special
2015	All Star Family Fortunes	Herself - Contestant	Series 11; Episode 10: "Matthew Wright vs Charley Webb"
2018	Celebrity Chase	Herself - Contestant	Series 8; Episode 5: "Emmerdale Special"
2020	Celebrity Supermarket Sweep	Herself - Contestant	Series 2; Episode 4
2023	Better	Elise	Episode 1
2023	The Long Shadow	WPC Anna Lawson	Mini-series; 4 episodes
2024	McDonald & Dodds	Hilary McLean	Series 4; Episode 2: "Jinxy Sings the Blues"
2024	Ellis	Abbie Summerfield	Episode 3: "Brindleton"
2026	Adultery	Leah Kirkman	

== Awards and nominations ==
Year	Award	Category	Result	Ref.
2003	Inside Soap Awards	Best Young Actor	Won	
2003	9th National Television Awards	Most Popular Newcomer	Nominated	
2005	British Soap Awards	Best Dramatic Performance from a Young Actor or Actress	Nominated	
2005	11th National Television Awards	Most Popular Actress	Nominated	
2005	Inside Soap Awards	Best Young Actor	Won	
2007	British Soap Awards	Best Actress	Nominated	
2007	Inside Soap Awards	Best Actress	Nominated	
2008	Inside Soap Awards	Best Bitch	Nominated	
2009	British Soap Awards	Best Actress	Nominated	
2009	Inside Soap Awards	Best Actress	Nominated	
2010	British Soap Awards	Sexiest Female	Nominated	
2012	17th National Television Awards	Serial Drama Performance	Nominated	
2012	British Soap Awards	Best Actress	Nominated	
2013	18th National Television Awards	Serial Drama Performance	Nominated	
2013	British Soap Awards	Villain of the Year	Nominated	
2013	British Soap Awards	Best Actress	Nominated	
2013	Inside Soap Awards	Best Bitch	Nominated	
2014	19th National Television Awards	Serial Drama Performance	Nominated	
2014	British Soap Awards	Sexiest Female	Nominated	
2014	British Soap Awards	Best Actress	Nominated	
2014	British Soap Awards	Best Dramatic Performance	Nominated	
2014	Inside Soap Awards	Best Actress	Nominated	
2015	TV Choice Awards	Best Soap Actress	Nominated	
2015	Inside Soap Awards	Best Actress	Shortlisted	
2015	Inside Soap Awards	Best Affair (shared with Michael Parr)	Won	
2016	21st National Television Awards	Serial Drama Performance	Nominated	
2019	24th National Television Awards	Serial Drama Performance	Nominated	
