= List of Emmerdale characters introduced in 2007 =

The following is a list of characters that first appeared in the British soap opera Emmerdale in 2007, by order of first appearance. All characters were introduced by the soap's executive producer, Keith Richardson.

== Charlotte Beecham ==
Charlotte Beecham
- Emmerdale character
- Portrayed by: Emma Hartley-Miller
- Duration: 2007–2009, 2015
- First appearance: 9 February 2007
- Last appearance: 26 November 2015
- Introduced by: Keith Richardson
In-universe information
- Occupation: Police officer

Charlotte Beecham is a new police recruit who joins up alongside Donna Windsor-Dingle (Verity Rushworth) and they receive their warrant cards at the same time. Charlotte has a casual relationship with Emmerdale resident and colleague Ross Kirk (Samuel Anderson). Another officer, Shane Doyle (Paul McEwan), makes a pass at her. In December 2008, Shane goes missing and Donna, who Shane knew was having an affair with Ross, convinces Charlotte to go to Shane's flat with her to investigate. They find evidence which suggests he is in Malta, and take it to Sgt. Andrew Drake (Steven Hillman). Charlotte believes that Donna knows more than she is saying, but Donna keeps quiet.

In January 2009, Charlotte and a colleague search Ross's bedroom, shortly before he is arrested for Shane's murder. Later that month, she searches the Dingles' house after Donna tells her superiors that she believes Eli Dingle (Joseph Gilgun) may have been involved with the murder. On 27 January 2009, PC Beecham is one of the police officers who find Jasmine Thomas (Jenna-Louise Coleman) and Debbie Dingle (Charley Webb), who Eli has admitted were involved in Shane's murder. In March, she and a colleague visit after a supplier alleges Bob Hope (Tony Audenshaw) stole his money. In May, Charlotte investigates a burglary at Holdgate Farm and arrests Cain Dingle (Jeff Hordley).

Charlotte returns in November 2015, investigating Diane Sugden's (Elizabeth Estensen) stabbing. She goes to Wishing Well Cottage, looking for Chas Dingle (Lucy Pargeter) but she isn't there so Charlotte tells Aaron Livesy (Danny Miller) to inform her if Chas shows up and leaves. She later returns to tell the Dingles that Chas has been arrested after confessing to stabbing Diane.

== Cathy Hope ==
Cathy Hope
- Emmerdale character
- Portrayed by: Ella Whitehouse Downes (2007); Gabrielle Dowling (2007–2025)
- Duration: 2007–2025
- First appearance: Episode 4595; 9 February 2007
- Last appearance: Episode 10,259; 4 April 2025
- Introduced by: Keith Richardson
In-universe information
- Father: Bob Hope
- Mother: Viv Hope
- Stepmother: Brenda Walker (2018–2019)
- Brothers: Heath Hope
- Half-brothers: Scott Windsor; Jamie Hope; Josh Hope
- Half-sisters: Dawn Woods; Donna Windsor; Carly Hope; Roxy Lockhart
- Uncles: Eddie Hope
- Nephews: T.J. Woods
- Nieces: April Windsor

Catherine "Cathy" Hope is the daughter of Bob (Tony Audenshaw) and Viv Hope (Deena Payne). She first appeared in February 2007.

Since Bob and Viv's remarriage in 2006 they had both wanted a child together. However, plans changed when Bob's daughter Dawn Woods (Julia Mallam) died in a show home explosion in July 2006. On the day of Dawn's funeral, Viv collapses and was found by her daughter Donna Windsor (Verity Rushworth). At the hospital, doctors revealed that Viv was pregnant. News spread quickly as Donna tells her brother and Viv's son Scott Windsor (Ben Freeman) and her husband Marlon Dingle (Mark Charnock) and Scott tells Dawn's ex-husband Terry Woods (Billy Hartman). Both Terry and Scott told Bob while his ex-wife Jean Hope (Susan Penhaligon) with Terry and Dawn's son T.J. Woods (Connor Lee) was inside. In August 2006, Viv was ready to have an abortion when Bob, Jean, Scott and Donna stopped her.

In February 2007, Viv went into labour, and gave birth to twins. Bob helps deliver a daughter while her twin brother is delivered by Paddy Kirk (Dominic Brunt). Having been born in a shed on the moors, Viv and Bob decide to name the children Cathy and Heath, with their actual names being Catherine and Heathcliff.

Cathy and Heath are baptised in May 2007, with nine godparents; Terry, Donna, Marlon, Paddy, Paddy's ex-wife Emily Kirk (Kate McGregor), Bob's two children Jamie Hope (Alex Carter) and Roxy Lockhart (Chloe Procter), Bob's brother Eddie Hope (Nigel Betts) and Viv's stepdaughter Kelly Windsor (Adele Silva). In July 2007, they are entered in a "Cute Kids" competition, which Heath wins.

In 2008, Viv begins raising money for children's charities, however, the man she entrusts with the charity money takes it and vanishes. By a series of mishaps, Viv implicates herself and is charged with conspiracy to defraud. With the help of a private investigator, she finds the man, but he threatens Cathy and Heath and gets away. In August 2008, Viv pleads guilty in court and is later sentenced to three years imprisonment. Her voice is later heard on a recording she makes of a bedtime story for Bob, Cathy and Heath.

In July 2009, Viv is released but is heartbroken when Cathy and Heath don't recognise her. Viv soon reveals that she had not been in touch with Bob, Cathy and Heath because she had been appealing against the length of her sentence. In January 2011, Viv, Cathy and Heath are inside the Post Office when it is set on fire by Nick Henshall (Michael McKell). Bob rescues Cathy and Heath and makes it out alive and Terry attempts to rescue Viv. The Post Office explodes and Viv and Terry are killed.

In late 2012, Bob starts dating Brenda Walker (Lesley Dunlop), who buys a part of the café and later moves in with them. Cathy and Heath develop a bond to her and the whole family struggles when in March 2013, she is diagnosed with a brain tumour. In March 2015, Bob's daughter Carly Hope (Gemma Atkinson) arrives in the village. In August 2015, Cathy and Heath stay with Brenda when Bob is sent to prison for fraud. However, he is released in September 2015, when Carly admits the truth about how she was fully involved in the fraud crime.

In December 2017, Brenda is devastated to find out Bob has been cheating on her with another woman. However, she decides to put it aside during Christmas for Cathy and Heath's sake. After Christmas Brenda tells Cathy and Heath that she and Bob are splitting up but decides to leave out the reason behind it so they won't hate their father. However, they overhear that he cheated on her and refuses to speak to him.

Despite the affair, Bob and Brenda reconcile and Brenda accepts when Bob proposes to her. After the wedding ceremony in May 2018, Brenda leaves Bob realising she won't settle for second best and Bob moves out of their home whilst Cathy and Heath stay with Brenda. However, Cathy is convinced they'll make up and questions Bob about returning home. Bob explains he isn't as he has done a selfish thing and Brenda deserves better. When Brenda realises Bob is still with Laurel Thomas (Charlotte Bellamy), she informs Cathy and Heath of her and Bob's relationship. Bob tries to explain himself to Cathy and Heath and says he is sorry. The next day, a furious Cathy insults Laurel.

In May 2018, Cathy and Heath set fire to a pile of Bob's belongings. When Bob confronts Brenda, thinking she was responsible, Cathy admits she and Heath did it. Bob sits them down and reminds Cathy and Heath that he loves them but states if they ever do anything like that again, they will be in a whole heap of trouble but Cathy and Heath walk out. Brenda finds them at the playground and Cathy expresses that she believes Bob no longer loves her and Heath. Brenda promises them that he does and assures them it is okay to be angry and upset but states it is never okay to start fires. Bob soon suggests it is better Cathy and Heath stay with him and Laurel. Despite Cathy and Heath's refusal to leave Brenda, Bob insists they'll just have to get used to it. In June 2018, Cathy and Heath continue to act up as they adjust to the new living arrangements and miss Brenda.

In November 2018, Cathy and Heath move back in with Brenda as Bob and Laurel's relationship starts to break down. Approaching Christmas 2018, Bob struggles to get enough money to buy Cathy and Heath their Christmas presents, disappointing them when he buys the wrong video games. In late January 2019, Bob's financial troubles gets so bad that he has to spend the night outside on a bench. He is found the next day and taken to hospital, suffering from severe hypothermia. He soon gets discharged and moves back in with Brenda, Cathy and Heath.

In March 2020, Cathy and Heath make a vegan cake in school which Brenda decides to give out to customers in the cafe in an attempt to stay on top of trends and not lose customers to the outdoor pursuits. However, she is horrified when the cake gives Dan Spencer (Liam Fox) an allergic reaction as he is allergic to almonds and Cathy and Heath reveal they used almond flour. They manage to sort things out but afterwards when Brenda tries the cake she is impressed by how good it is.

Over summer 2021, Cathy gets jealous of all the attention her niece April Windsor (Amelia Flanagan) is receiving on her memorial page for Donna. Cathy trolls April on a social media account about Donna and spreads her phone number all while pretending to be on April's side by giving her support. In September 2021, Cathy starts to regret her actions, but it's too late as other children have also started to troll April. Cathy confesses what she has done to April, and after a frosty reception from April, Cathy spends the night in the Cricket Pavilion. The next day Cathy is found by Rhona Goskirk (Zoe Henry), who has found out about the bullying, Rhona forces Cathy to confess to Bob and Brenda, which leads to a scuffle between Rhona and Brenda, in which Brenda is pushed to the ground.

For her role as Cathy, Dowling was longlisted for "Best Young Performer" at the 2024 Inside Soap Awards.

== Heath Hope ==
Heath Hope
- Emmerdale character
- Portrayed by: Lilith Kitching (2007); Sebastian Dowling (2007–2024)
- Duration: 2007–2024
- First appearance: Episode 4595; 9 February 2007
- Last appearance: Episode 9877; 1 January 2024
- Introduced by: Keith Richardson
In-universe information
- Father: Bob Hope
- Mother: Viv Hope
- Stepmother: Brenda Walker (2018-2019)
- Sisters: Cathy Hope
- Half-brothers: Scott Windsor; Jamie Hope; Josh Hope
- Half-sisters: Dawn Woods; Donna Windsor; Carly Hope; Roxy Lockhart
- Uncles: Eddie Hope
- Nephews: T.J. Woods
- Nieces: April Windsor

Heathcliff "Heath" Hope is the son of Bob (Tony Audenshaw) and Viv Hope (Deena Payne). He first appeared in February 2007. Dowling made an unannounced departure when his character was killed off in a car accident on 1 January 2024.

Since Bob and Viv's remarriage in August 2006, they had wanted a child. When Viv finally found out she was pregnant, Bob did not want another child because of the death of his daughter Dawn Woods (Julia Mallam). She was ready to have an abortion when Bob stopped her. Heath and twin sister Cathy Hope are born in February 2007 in a shed on the moors, hence their names, delivered by Paddy Kirk (Dominic Brunt). Heath is the younger of the twins. They are baptised in May 2007, with nine godparents; Paddy, Dawn's estranged husband Terry Woods (Billy Hartman), Marlon Dingle (Mark Charnock), Marlon's wife and Viv's daughter Donna Windsor-Dingle (Verity Rushworth), Bob's two children Jamie Hope (Alex Carter) and Roxy Lockhart (Chloe Procter), Paddy's ex-wife Emily Kirk (Kate McGregor), Bob's brother Eddie Hope (Nigel Betts) and Kelly Windsor (Adele Silva). In July 2007, Cathy and Heath are entered in a "Cute Kids" competition, which Heath wins.

== Sharon Lambert ==
Sharon Lambert
- Emmerdale character
- Portrayed by: Victoria Hawkins
- Duration: 2007–2008
- First appearance: 13 February 2007
- Last appearance: 17 June 2008
- Introduced by: Keith Richardson
In-universe information
- Father: Jimmy Pepper
- Mother: Val Pollard
- Half-brothers: Paul Lambert; Dane Pepper; Shane Pepper
- Husband: Lee (2012–present)
- Daughters: Alice
- Aunts: Diane Sugden
- First cousins: Bernice Blackstock

Sharon Lambert is the daughter of Val Lambert (Charlie Hardwick) and her former partner Jimmy Pepper (Michael Gunn), and sister of Paul Lambert (Mathew Bose). She appeared in 2007 and 2008.

Sharon arrives in the village in February 2007. With her upcoming wedding to footballer Dan McHerron (Patrick Molyneux), she sends invitations to her brother Paul and her aunt Diane Sugden (Elizabeth Estensen) but not her mother. Paul and Diane wonder whether to accept the invitations, partly as Paul also has issues with Sharon. Val sees in a magazine that Sharon is getting married and goes to meet Sharon at Skipdale Hall, the venue chosen for the wedding. Val gets drunk with Dan and she has an argument with Sharon after it is revealed that Val had slept with Sharon's first boyfriend when she was 15 and the boyfriend 17. Val is thrown out and goes for drinks with local journalist John McNally (Steven Farebrother). The following morning, the whole story is in the Hotton Courier. Sharon and Dan's wedding day does not go well and they do not marry as Sharon is revealed as a gold digger.

Sharon returns to the village on 2 June 2008 for Val's wedding to Eric Pollard (Chris Chittell) and seems a reformed character. After the ceremony, she ends up kissing Eric's son, David Metcalfe (Matthew Wolfenden), and while she only sees it as bit of fun, he seems to take things more seriously. David and Nicola De Souza (Nicola Wheeler), who is close to him, overhear Sharon telling a friend that she does not really care about David and is only staying until she has another celebrity party to go to. Nicola and Sharon later get into a fight in the Woolpack when Nicola tells her that David is leaving her. Val is furious that Sharon has gone back on her offer to take her to her next big party and washes her hands of Sharon, who then leaves Emmerdale, saying she wants nothing to do with any of them.

In September 2015, Sharon is unable to attend her mother's funeral as she is looking after her young daughter, Alice. She rings Paul after the service to ask how it went.

== Carrie Nicholls ==
Carrie Nicholls
- Emmerdale character
- Portrayed by: Linda Lusardi
- Duration: 2007–2008
- First appearance: 20 February 2007
- Last appearance: 5 February 2008
- Introduced by: Keith Richardson
In-universe information
- Occupation: Nurse
- Husband: Nick Barrie (2008–present)
- Daughters: Lexi King; Scarlett Nicholls

Carrie Barrie (also Nicholls), played by Linda Lusardi, first appeared on 20 February 2007. She was introduced as the former nurse of Tom King's wife Mary. It was subsequently revealed that she was the mother of his illegitimate daughter. It was announced on 28 September 2007 on ITV's This Morning that Lusardi had quit the role and would leave in early 2008.

Matthew King (Matt Healy) tries to get rid of Carrie and her daughter, Scarlett (Kelsey-Beth Crossley), by cutting all financial ties so Carrie would sell them Scarlett's shares. Carl King (Tom Lister) also wants to get rid of Carrie - it is later revealed that they had had a brief fling when Carl was a teenager. He seemed angry that she took his virginity and later rejected him. Scarlett refuses to sell her shares and insists that she and Carrie move to the village, buying Mill Brook Cottage. When the King brothers face prison sentences, Jimmy King (Nick Miles) suggests that Carrie be named a director of King & Sons so that she can run the business in their absence. The Kings are later cleared but Carrie stays within the business. It is later revealed that Carrie is Lexi Nicholls' (Sally Oliver) mother, not her sister. Carrie gave birth to Lexi when she was 14. She confides in Jimmy, and after eventually declaring her love to Jimmy, she realises that her feelings are unreciprocated. Carrie then receives a job offer from an ex-boyfriend, Nick Barrie (Sam Kane). The job is in Canada and she decides to take it and rekindle her relationship with Nick.

For her role as Carrie, Lusardi was nominated for "Best Newcomer" at the 2007 Inside Soap Awards.

== Douglas Potts ==
Douglas Potts
- Emmerdale character
- Portrayed by: Duncan Preston; Andrew C. Wadsworth (2016, Ashley’s perspective)
- Duration: 2007–2011, 2014–2020
- First appearance: Episode 4663; 30 April 2007
- Last appearance: Episode 8744; 27 February 2020
- Introduced by: Kathleen Beedles (2007); Kate Oates (2014)
In-universe information
- Occupation: Entrepreneur; Bar manager B&B assistant Cafe Waiter
- Wife: Hilary Potts (1967–2015)
- Daughters: Laurel Thomas; Caroline Swann
- Grandsons: Arthur Thomas; Edward Swann
- Granddaughters: Dotty Thomas; Beatrice Swann

Douglas "Doug" Potts, played by Duncan Preston, made his first appearance on 30 April 2007. He was introduced as Laurel Thomas's (Charlotte Bellamy) father, alongside Paula Wilcox as her mother Hilary Potts. Bellamy commented "I was so honoured when I found out they'd be playing my mum and dad. I've grown up with Duncan on TV, so it's great to be working alongside him." In July 2010, Preston announced that he was taking a break from the show, initially temporarily for several months to allow him to do some theatre work. However, it was later announced by Executive Producer, Steve November, that a return for the character of Doug wasn't definite. November stated that the door would remain open for Preston to come back to the show but that it was in the actor's hands if and when he decides to discuss a return. On 30 July 2014, it was announced that Preston has reprised the role and Doug is returning to the show as a regular character from September. During a December 2016 episode of the show, Doug was recast temporarily to provide an alternative physical appearance from the viewpoint of dementia patient Ashley Thomas (John Middleton). On Doug's most memorable moment; a writer from Holy Soap said that "despite bringing some real gravitas to the soap, he's best remembered for when he caught an unfortunate STD [...] and was arrested for indecent behaviour in a public place because he was scratching himself."

Doug is Laurel Thomas' father. He and Laurel's mother, Hilary Potts, come to the village to visit their daughter but after they leave, they are involved in a car accident. Doug suffers minor injuries but Hilary is comatose for several weeks. Laurel immediately goes to look after her father despite being heavily pregnant. Doug tells Hilary after she recovers that Laurel had moved in to take care of him and the house while she was ill. Doug returns with Hilary to meet their grandson, Daniel. Daniel dies of cot death and Hilary asks a devastated Doug to contain his grief for Laurel's sake, and he confides his true feelings to Pearl Ladderbanks (Meg Johnson). Hilary and Doug leave the village after Laurel bans Hilary from attending a memorial service for Daniel. They return a couple of weeks later. Laurel and Hilary resolve things and Hilary and Doug move in with Laurel and her husband, Ashley Thomas (John Middleton).

Hilary discovers that Daniel was not Laurel and Ashley's son and when she confides her suspicions to Doug, he is reluctant to believe her but she is later proved to be right. Hilary falls out with Laurel over this and leaves but Doug stays to support Laurel, and gets a job at Eric Pollard's (Chris Chittell) furniture factory. Doug makes plans to reunite with Hilary, but she telephones him and asks for a divorce. Doug begins suffering a midlife crisis and buys himself a new sports car and has sex with Bonnie Drinkwater (Sue Jenkins), a friend of Val Lambert's (Charlie Hardwick). Laurel and Ashley trick Bonnie into leaving the village, but she unwittingly causes more problems for Doug. In the village shop, Brenda Walker (Lesley Dunlop) notices him scratching his crotch, and assuming he is a pervert, calls the police. Doug is arrested but released without charge when it is revealed he had an STI, passed on to him by Bonnie. The news spreads around the village and Doug feels humiliated. Laurel reassures him that they would both laugh about the event sometime in the future. Doug disagrees but laughs with her.

Doug begins building a relationship with Brenda but her daughter, Gennie (Sian Reese-Williams), realises that Brenda has feelings for Bob Hope (Tony Audenshaw). Brenda initially denies it but eventually ends her relationship with Doug, and begins dating Terry Woods (Billy Hartman) instead. Brenda and Doug continue to be friends, and they form Emmerdale Explorers, a playgroup for the local children. They receive some funding from Natasha Wylde (Amanda Donohoe), but they disagree repeatedly over her son, Will (Oscar Lloyd), attending the group. Eventually, Doug returns her money. Doug begins to resent Terry's involvement in the Explorers project, and his jealousy is further increased when he learns that Brenda intends to buy half of Bob's business. Doug convinces Terry and Bob that Brenda only wants to buy into the business to try to win Bob's heart. When Bob reneges on the deal, a furious Brenda pours a pint over Doug's head. Doug later apologises for interfering.

Doug loses his job when Eric closes his factory as a result of the credit crunch. Doug soon begins running the Home Farm Fayre shop in the village with Leyla Harding (Roxy Shahidi). Doug becomes attracted to Diane Sugden (Elizabeth Estensen) and asks her out but she turns him down. Doug is unhappy when Charlie Haynes (George Costigan), a friend of Diane's ex-husband, Rodney Blackstock (Patrick Mower), arrives in the village and begins a relationship with Diane. Fearing Charlie is a con-artist, Doug informs Diane of his suspicions, but Diane does not believe him. Diane later discovers that Charlie has fled the village with her money and she forgives Doug for not believing him, but tells him she does not want a romantic relationship. Diane and Doug remain good friends and Doug offers Diane a loan when she faces financial problems as a result of Charlie's actions. Diane is reluctant to accept at first but eventually does so and Doug is pleased to have helped her.

Doug tells Diane that he is seeing a woman, but does not reveal details. Doug eventually tells Diane that his new girlfriend is Hilary. He asks Diane to not tell Laurel and explains that he wants to give his marriage another go. On 11 February, Doug tells Laurel that he is going on a cruise with Hilary. He also tells Laurel that he intends to move back in with her at their old home. Laurel is reluctant at first but eventually accepts her father's decision. At the same time Diane realises that she does have feelings for Doug after all and invites him to a romantic meal at The Woolpack. He tells her of his plans and she is disappointed. On Valentine's Day, as Doug is about to leave, Laurel and Diane's sister, Val, arrange for Doug to meet Diane at the pub. Diane tells Doug that she regrets turning him down, and pleads with him to stay and give her another chance. But Doug is dismissive, telling Diane that had Charlie not been a conman then she would have gone to Spain with him and that he was not the sort of man she wanted and that he did not want to settle for second best. Doug then leaves and says farewell to Laurel, Ashley, Leyla and Ashley's father Sandy (Freddie Jones). As he is leaving the pub, Diane follows him outside and wishes him well. They embrace and bid each other farewell, parting on good terms. Doug then gets into his waiting taxi and is driven out of the village.

Doug returns to the village for Laurel's wedding to Marlon Dingle (Mark Charnock), and he moves in with the couple and their children for a while. He reveals to Laurel and Marlon that Laurel's mother, Hilary, has begun a relationship with an Italian man named Alberto. He rekindles his relationship with Diane, and his friendship with Leyla. He starts a vlog about gardening and builds up a fan base, however other residents find this silly, which humiliates Doug. In early 2015, Doug notices that Laurel is drinking more than normal, and soon realises that she has descended into alcoholism. He tries to stop Laurel from drinking, but his actions result in Laurel throwing Doug out, forcing him to move in with Diane. Doug's worries for Laurel's health grow when she is hospitalised after choking on her own vomit after drinking two bottles of wine. He mentions his concerns regarding Laurel's drinking to Diane numerous times. Doug is upset to hear that Hilary has died from heart failure, but is furious at her funeral when Alberto acts as if he knew Hilary for longer than he did, despite Doug's almost fifty-year marriage to Hilary. Doug is later heartbroken to learn that Diane has stomach cancer. He supports Diane as she decides to sell her share of The Woolpack.

Doug finds out that Laurel is remarrying Ashley, which concerns him as Ashley has dementia. Laurel later miscarries her and Ashley's baby, and Doug realises he does not agree with Ashley and Laurel's marriage, and tried to talk Laurel out of it, but this only results in a rift in their relationship. They later reconcile on Laurel's hen night party, where Doug also discovers Laurel is still pregnant, and Doug witnesses Laurel and Ashley's wedding the following day. Their happiness is short lived as Ashley suffers a "mini-stroke" which results in him losing months from his memory, leading him to believe he is still dating Harriet Finch (Katherine Dow Blyton). Doug gives Laurel a shoulder to cry on, but Ashley suddenly and miraculously remembers his wedding. Diane and Doug invest in Eric's B&B becoming co-owners alongside Eric. At the same time, Diane sells her share of the pub to Charity Dingle (Emma Atkins), however, Doug does not trust her. He later serves behind the bar whenever he can, before going to Spain to help Diane look after an ill Annie Sugden (Sheila Mercier).

== Hilary Potts ==
Hilary Potts
- Emmerdale character
- Portrayed by: Paula Wilcox
- Duration: 2007–2008
- First appearance: 30 April 2007
- Last appearance: 7 May 2008
- Introduced by: Keith Richardson
In-universe information
- Husband: Douglas Potts (1967–2015)
- Daughters: Laurel Thomas; Caroline Swann
- Grandsons: Edward Swann; Arthur Thomas
- Granddaughters: Beatrice Swann; Dotty Thomas

Hilary Potts, played by Paula Wilcox, made her first screen appearance on 30 April 2007.

Hilary and her husband, Douglas Potts (Duncan Preston), arrived on 30 April, for a meal with their daughter Laurel Thomas (Charlotte Bellamy). All went well, but after they left, they were involved in a car accident. Both survived the crash and returned to the village to see their new grandson, Daniel. Tragically, Daniel died in February 2008 from sudden infant death syndrome. Hilary and Doug stayed until the funeral but a devastated Laurel told Hilary she blamed her for Daniel's death, as Hilary convinced Laurel not to check on Daniel when they heard him crying, believing that he was just having a bad dream. Hilary tried to work out their problems but Laurel asked her to leave. Hilary and Doug went home but visited again several weeks later. Laurel and Hilary reconciled and Hilary and Doug moved in with Laurel and her husband Ashley (John Middleton).

The family began to move on from the tragedy of Daniel's death, but Daniel's postmortem revealed that he had been a carrier for cystic fibrosis. Ashley, Laurel and her parents were puzzled as neither family knew of any relative with that condition. Hilary became concerned when she learned Melanie Doland (Caroline Strong), whose son, Arthur (Alfie Clarke), who was born the same day as Daniel, said her sister had died of cystic fibrosis. A few weeks later, Greg Doland (Shaun Prendergast) told Hilary that Arthur was allergic to seafood. This was common in Hilary's family. Hilary became convinced that Daniel was not Laurel and Ashley's son, and despite Douglas, Ashley and Laurel thinking what Hilary was saying was due to her grief, she convinced the doctor to check the blood types again. This proved what Hilary had been saying - that Daniel was not Ashley and Laurel's son. Laurel was devastated and slapped Hilary for adding to their agony. Hilary felt guilty for what her daughter had gone through, but told Doug she knew the Dolands were raising Laurel's and Ashley's son.

When Hilary found out the Dolands were going on holiday to Spain, she vanished with Arthur. They were soon found, but Ashley told the Dolands about the possible baby mix-up. Greg and Mel attempted to emigrate with Arthur, but Ashley stopped them. Hilary called the police, who said they could not intervene, but fearing she would lose her son, Mel ran away with Arthur. Laurel refused to accept that Arthur might be her son. Hilary told Laurel she could not watch her ignore her son and went home. Seven years later, Hilary dies after suffering heart failure. Doug informs Laurel by telephone. Laurel, her current husband Marlon Dingle (Mark Charnock), Ashley, Doug, and his partner Diane Sugden (Elizabeth Estensen) attended Hilary's funeral.

== Caroline Swann ==
Caroline Swann
- Emmerdale character
- Portrayed by: Sarah Moyle
- Duration: 2007, 2009, 2015
- First appearance: 25 May 2007
- Last appearance: 20 July 2015
- Introduced by: Keith Richardson
In-universe information
- Father: Douglas Potts
- Mother: Hilary Potts
- Sisters: Laurel Thomas
- Husband: Ben Swann
- Sons: Edward Swann
- Daughters: Beatrice Swann
- Nephews: Arthur Thomas
- Nieces: Dotty Thomas

Caroline Swann (also Potts) is the sister of Laurel Thomas (Charlotte Bellamy). Caroline first appeared on 25 May 2007, at the hospital when her mother Hilary (Paula Wilcox) woke up from a coma caused by a car crash. The elder of Doug (Duncan Preston) and Hilary's two children, Caroline was always her mother's favourite as a child, even in adult life, causing some resentment from Laurel. Caroline returns on 2 December 2007 when her parents return to their home after staying with Laurel and Ashley (John Middleton) in Emmerdale. Caroline says that her husband, Ben, has been made redundant and they have lost their house, so without asking they had moved into Doug and Hilary's house. Doug and Hilary then decide to move back to Emmerdale.

Caroline is seen again on 8 December 2009 when Doug and Ashley turn up at Hilary's house to see Laurel, following Ashley and Laurel's separation. During the visit, Caroline reveals that she was also having marriage issues with her husband Ben. In July 2015, Caroline appears again attending her mother's funeral. She hosts the wake at her house, assuming Laurel is pregnant when she wonders why she is not drinking alcohol. This causes Laurel to lash out at Caroline and reveal that she is an alcoholic and is splitting up with her husband Marlon (Mark Charnock). Caroline also reveals to Doug that she feels resentful at Laurel's lack of contact with Hilary in the previous years. Laurel later leaves to stay with Caroline for a few weeks to deal with alcoholism.

== Duke Woods ==
Duke Woods
- Emmerdale character
- Portrayed by: Dicken Ashworth
- Duration: 2007–2008
- First appearance: 20 June 2007
- Last appearance: 28 January 2008
- Introduced by: Keith Richardson
In-universe information
- Sons: Terry Woods
- Grandsons: Thomas Carter; T.J. Woods

Percy "Duke" Woods, played by Dicken Ashworth, made his first appearance on 20 June 2007. Ashworth's casting and character details were announced a month ahead of his character's on-screen debut. Duke is introduced as the father of established character Terry Woods (Billy Hartman). Ashworth told ITV.com: "Duke is Terry's estranged father. Basically they've not been in contact for a long time. But when Terry sees him on TV he thinks his dad might be in a bit of trouble and goes to see him, but he almost doesn't. Duke's wife died when he was very young and then he brought Terry up alone, He tried to push him too hard into sport, especially boxing, and live his own life though his son, so they don't speak – though I think there were other big issues as well."

Duke departed on 28 January 2008. Of his character's departure, Ashworth said: "I would have been quite happy to stay, but basically a lot depends in soap on the writers and storylines, and my storyline came to a natural end." He also said that as his character did not die, he had the opportunity to return.

Terry invites his father to the village after watching him confront some teenagers on television. He believes that Duke will do better in the Dales. Duke and Pearl Ladderbanks (Meg Johnson) vandalise Jacob's Fold and get arrested. An article in the Hotten Courier reveals that his first name is actually Percy. Duke leaves the village to help Ryan Hayworth (Reece Noi) with his football training.

== Brenda McFarlane ==
Brenda McFarlane
- Emmerdale character
- Portrayed by: Judy Holt
- Duration: 2007–2008
- First appearance: 5 August 2007
- Last appearance: 18 March 2008
- Introduced by: Keith Richardson
In-universe information
- Husband: Colin McFarlane (until 2007)

Brenda McFarlane is married to Colin McFarlane (Michael Melia). She first appears looking for Chas Dingle (Lucy Pargeter), who was sleeping with her husband Colin when he died. Chas thinks that Brenda wants revenge so she and Lexi Nicholls (Sally Oliver) prepare to run away. However, the following day they meet her when she turns up at Chas's house. To their surprise, Brenda hands them some money to thank them for killing her husband - although Colin died of natural causes.

Brenda reappears on 17 March 2008, when Chas goes to her to ask for her help. Chas and Debbie Dingle (Charley Webb) are trying to help Jo Stiles (Roxanne Pallett) get rid of Charlie Sellers (Michael Keogh), a former prisoner who is staying in Jo's house and threatening her. Brenda agrees to allow Charlie and Chas to rob one of her nightclubs, and let him then get caught by the police. However, the following day things go wrong when Charlie holds the bar manager hostage with a gun. He and Chas escape, but Brenda later comes after Charlie with a "heavy". She tells Charlie to leave and he has no choice but to agree.

== Daniel Thomas ==
Daniel Thomas
- Emmerdale character
- Portrayed by: Rachel Moonie
- Duration: 2007–2008
- First appearance: 26 August 2007
- Last appearance: 21 February 2008
- Introduced by: Keith Richardson
In-universe information
- Father: Greg Doland
- Mother: Melanie Doland
- Adoptive father: Ashley Thomas
- Adoptive mother: Laurel Thomas
- Half-brothers: Jake Doland; Arthur Thomas (adoptive)

Daniel Thomas was the biological son of Greg (Shaun Prendergast) and Melanie Doland (Caroline Strong), although during his short life, he is the son of Ashley (John Middleton) and Laurel Thomas (Charlotte Bellamy). He appeared from 2007 to 2008.

Born on 26 August 2007, an accidental baby-swap in the hospital saw Daniel given to Ashley and Laurel Thomas, while their biological son Arthur (Alfie Clarke) is given to the Dolands. He is christened in December 2007, with Shadrach Dingle (Andy Devine) acting as godfather, who surprises people by caring very much for Daniel and promising to teach him things when he is older. On 21 February 2008, Daniel dies in his sleep of cot death, leaving Laurel and Ashley devastated. Laurel's mother Hilary Potts (Paula Wilcox) soon starts to think that Daniel is not Laurel and Ashley's son, and eventually DNA tests prove this, and that Daniel was Greg and Mel's son. Greg and Mel leave the village in July 2008, after Laurel and Ashley are awarded custody of Arthur.

== Melanie Doland ==
Melanie Doland
- Emmerdale character
- Portrayed by: Caroline Strong
- Duration: 2007–2008
- First appearance: 22 August 2007
- Last appearance: 1 July 2008
- Introduced by: Keith Richardson
In-universe information
- Husband: Greg Doland
- Sons: Daniel Doland
- Stepsons: Jake Doland

Melanie "Mel" Doland is married to Greg Doland (Shaun Prendergast) and former biological mother of Daniel Thomas. She appeared from 2007 to 2008.

Mel first appears along with Greg when she is giving birth at the same time as Laurel Thomas (Charlotte Bellamy). Unbeknown to either couple, their babies are accidentally swapped at the hospital, and Mel's biological son, Daniel, goes home with Laurel and Ashley Thomas (John Middleton), while Laurel's biological son, Arthur (Alfie Clarke), goes home with the Dolands. The couples become friends and their children are baptised at the same time by Bishop George Postlethwaite (Peter Cartwright). The Dolands become more frequent visitors to Emmerdale village when Greg, a builder, and Jack Sugden (Clive Hornby) come to an arrangement for the redevelopment of Annie's Cottage. When Jack later sells Annie's Cottage, the Dolands buy it and move to the village.

On 21 February 2008, Daniel dies of cot death. Soon after, Laurel's mother Hilary Potts (Paula Wilcox) starts to suspect Arthur may be the Thomas' son not Greg and Mel's. They try and flee the country, but Ashley stops them. The police await their return, although they are not charged. Mel later runs away with Arthur on her own, but is later found. In June, the courts award custody of Arthur to his biological parents, Ashley and Laurel, leaving Mel particularly devastated. Over the coming weeks, Laurel has problems bonding with Arthur and Mel makes frequent visits to see Arthur. When Laurel finally bonds with Arthur, Greg and Mel leave the village as Mel realises there is no place for them anymore.

== Greg Doland ==
Greg Doland
- Emmerdale character
- Portrayed by: Shaun Prendergast
- Duration: 2007–2008
- First appearance: 22 August 2007
- Last appearance: 1 July 2008
- Introduced by: Keith Richardson
In-universe information
- Occupation: Builder
- Wife: Melanie Doland
- Sons: Jake Doland; Daniel Doland

Gregory "Greg" Doland is the husband of Melanie Doland (Caroline Strong), father of Jake Doland (James Baxter) and former biological father of Daniel Thomas. He appeared from 2007 to 2008.

Greg first appears along with Mel when she is giving birth at the same time as Laurel Thomas (Charlotte Bellamy). Unbeknown to either couple, their babies are accidentally swapped at the hospital, and Mel's biological son, Daniel, goes home with Laurel and Ashley Thomas (John Middleton), while Laurel's biological son, Arthur, goes home with the Dolands. The couples become friends and their children are baptised at the same time by Bishop George Postlethwaite (Peter Cartwright). The Dolands become more frequent visitors to Emmerdale village when Greg, a builder, and Jack Sugden (Clive Hornby) come to an arrangement for the redevelopment of Annie's Cottage. When Jack later sells Annie's Cottage, the Dolands buy it and move to the village.

On 21 February 2008, Daniel dies of cot death. During a period when Laurel is estranged from Ashley, Greg tries to comfort her and she kisses him. A guilt-ridden Laurel returns to her husband and she and Greg promise to keep quiet about what had happened. Soon after Daniel's death, Laurel's mother Hilary Potts (Paula Wilcox) starts to suspect Arthur may be the Thomas' son not Greg and Mel's. They try and flee the country, but Ashley stops them. The police await their return, although they are not charged. Mel later runs away with Arthur on her own, only telling her stepson Jake Doland (James Baxter) where she is. After a few weeks, Greg persuades her to come home. At a court hearing on 5 June, a judge decides to award custody of Arthur to his biological parents, Laurel and Ashley. Over the coming weeks, Laurel has problems bonding with Arthur and Mel makes frequent visits to visit him. Greg, however, does not visit Arthur, causing arguments between the couple. When Laurel finally bonds with Arthur, Greg and Mel leave the village as Mel realises there is no place for her anymore.

== Arthur Thomas ==
Arthur Thomas
- Emmerdale character
- Portrayed by: Billy Harrower (2007–2009); Luis Townley (2008–2009); Alfie Clarke (2009–present)
- Duration: 2007–present
- First appearance: Episode 4765; 26 August 2007
- Introduced by: Keith Richardson
In-universe information
- Father: Ashley Thomas
- Mother: Laurel Thomas
- Stepfather: Marlon Dingle; Jai Sharma
- Sisters: Dotty Thomas
- Half-sisters: Gabby Thomas
- Grandfathers: Sandy Thomas; Douglas Potts
- Grandmothers: Hilary Potts; Dorothy Thomas
- Uncles: Luke Thomas
- Aunts: Caroline Swann; Karen Thomas
- Nephews: Thomas Tate
- First cousins: Jasmine Thomas

Arthur Thomas (also Doland) is the son of Ashley (John Middleton) and Laurel Thomas (Charlotte Bellamy). He has appeared since 26 August 2007.

Born in August 2007, Arthur is the biological son of Ashley and Laurel. However, an accidental baby-swap sees him being given to Greg (Shaun Prendergast) and Melanie Doland (Caroline Strong), who gives birth nearby on the same day. Their biological son, Daniel Doland, dies of cot death in February 2008. Laurel's mother Hilary Potts (Paula Wilcox) soon starts to think that Arthur is not Greg and Melanie's son, and eventually DNA tests prove this. After a court decision, Arthur is handed over to Ashley and Laurel in June 2008. Arthur then refuses to eat and Melanie comes round and helps out. Eventually, Laurel bonds with Arthur, and Greg and Melanie leave the village. Arthur is last seen in December 2009 after Laurel believes that Sally Spode (Siân Reeves) has abducted him but is humiliated when he turns up with her and Ashley having gone out for a trip. Off-screen, he leaves with Laurel and Ashley's daughter Gabby Thomas to Hilary's house although Gabby later returns. Arthur returns to the village with Laurel and she and Ashley reconcile after Sally is arrested.

In early 2016, Arthur and Gabby (now Rosie Bentham) learn Ashley has dementia. When Ashley builds a pirate ship play house for Arthur, Arthur cuts himself with a saw and Ashley takes him to hospital. Arthur is left alone when Ashley wanders off and ends up at Laurel's baby scan. Laurel and Ashley are told that Ashley isn't to be left on his own with Arthur and Laurel tries to hide it from him. In September 2016, Laurel gives birth to hers and Ashley's daughter, Dotty Thomas, who is Arthur's younger sister. In December 2016, Laurel tells Gabby and Arthur that they are looking at full time care for Ashley following a stroke he has. Laurel struggles to cope, so she decides to move Ashley into full time care, upsetting Gabby and Arthur. Arthur visits Ashley with Laurel and Gabby and sees Ashley with a woman he has developed a bond with. After Gabby has a hard time at school, Laurel takes her and Arthur out of school on compassionate leave. In April 2017, Ashley is diagnosed with pneumonia when he coughs up blood and Arthur blames himself, after visiting Ashley and being sick. Laurel is told that Ashley is not responding to treatment and that the family should start saying goodbye, which she tells Gabby and Arthur. Laurel brings Ashley home for his final days and he later passes away. At Ashley's funeral, Arthur reads a poem, but runs off and tells Laurel he will never be able to make new memories with Ashley. Arthur overhears Laurel and her father Douglas Potts (Duncan Preston) talking about Gabby going to Australia with her mother, Bernice White (Samantha Giles), to visit her half-sister, Dee Dee. Arthur is upset with Gabby and thinks Dee Dee will take his place, but Gabby reassures him that won't happen. Arthur is troubled when he finds a video of Emma Barton (Gillian Kearney) talking to Ashley about a car crash that occurred months before Ashley remembers Emma was present.

Laurel starts dating Jai Sharma (Chris Bisson) in 2019. Not long afterwards, Jai's son Archie Breckle (Kai Assi) comes to live with Jai after losing his mother. Arthur begins to resent Archie and starts bullying him. Their differences come to a head when they accidentally cause a fire whilst out camping and putting Arthur's younger sister Dotty in danger. Laurel has the police interrogate Arthur to teach him a lesson.

In December 2022, Arthur comes out as gay to Nicola King (Nicola Wheeler), Laurel's friend. He is supported by Nicola, Laurel, and his friends, although Elliot Windsor (Luca Hoyle) reveals Arthur's sexuality to the rest of the school. Arthur becomes attracted to schoolmate Marshall Hamston (Max Fletcher), who tricks Arthur into thinking he is attracted to him. Consequently, Arthur records a video commentary calling Marshall out for his behaviour. Marshall tries to talk to Arthur, but Arthur's friend April Windsor (Amelia Flanagan) hits him, and Laurel orders Marshall to stay away from her son. However, it emerges that Marshall really is attracted to Arthur, and is being abused by his homophobic father Colin Hamston (Mark Noble). Marshall escapes from Colin with Laurel's help and moves in with Arthur. However, their relationship does not work out and Marshall moves away to live with relatives, leaving Arthur heartbroken. When Arthur's friend Heath Hope (Sebastian Dowling) is killed in an accident in 2024, Arthur mourns him and organises a tribute for him.

In February 2026, Arthur and Laurel were having a heated argument and Arthur wanted to go out. Laurel blocked Arthur's path to get him to stay inside. In result of this, Arthur pushed Laurel out of the way which made her hit her head on the stairs. Laurel was rushed into the hospital and Arthur thought that he had killed her. Laurel eventually woke up and when she was asked what caused it, she made up a lie about how she tripped over some toys. Later, Laurel confronted Arthur at home and said that she knew it was him who did it. Not long after that, Arthur did admit that he caused it to some other people. Previously, Arthur said that he was moving to Manchester because he got a job in tech. He had later revealed to Laurel that it was actually a lie though to make her seem more proud of him. Laurel was saying to Arthur that she was really proud of him as he was taking good responsibility.

In August 2017, Clarke was longlisted for Best Young Actor at the Inside Soap Awards. He made the viewer-voted shortlist. On 6 November 2017, Clarke won the "Best Young Actor" accolade.

== Patricia Foster ==
Patricia Foster
- Emmerdale character
- Portrayed by: Vicki Michelle
- Duration: 2007–2009
- First appearance: 31 August 2007
- Last appearance: 13 January 2009
- Introduced by: Keith Richardson
In-universe information
- Occupation: Housewife
- Husband: Sam Foster (1993–present)
- Sons: Jonny Foster

Patricia Foster is the mother of Jonny Foster (Richard Grieve). She appeared in 2007, 2008 and 2009.

Patricia first arrives in the village in 2007 to present a £5000 cheque to her son, local farrier Jonny Foster, which he can invest in his future with his partner Paul Lambert (Matthew Bose). She returns in 2008 for Jonny's commitment ceremony to Paul, who had already married Jonny hours beforehand in a civil partnership. On 12 January 2009, Patricia returns to the village and argues with Paul outside "The Woolpack" during a divorce party being held for him by his mother, Val Pollard (Charlie Hardwick). Patricia tells Paul that Jonny has emigrated to Australia. The following day Patricia and Val talk, and Val assures her that Paul still loves Jonny and that the divorce party was not his idea. The bonding moment is short-lived, as they begin to argue over who is the "woman" in the relationship, and soon Patricia tries to shame Val by bringing up Paul's fling with Grayson Sinclair (Christopher Villiers). Just as a furious Patricia prepares to leave, Paul arrives, and talks with her privately. Patricia tells him that Jonny is still in love with him.

== Freddie Yorke ==
Freddie Yorke
- Emmerdale character
- Portrayed by: Keith Woodason
- Duration: 2007–2008
- First appearance: 25 November 2007
- Last appearance: 19 August 2008
- Introduced by: Keith Richardson

Freddie Yorke is a con man who frames Viv Hope (Deena Payne) for fraud. He appeared in 2007 and 2008.

Freddie meets Viv in late 2007 and persuades her to work with the "Happy Smile Fund", his children's charity. After she has too much to drink, he kisses her. Viv works hard to raise money for the charity, but in early 2008 she realises that the money is not going to the charity. She makes it up with her own money, but fails to get in contact with Freddie. In March 2008, Viv is arrested for fraud and finds that her names have been put down on many pieces of incriminating paperwork. In July, a private investigator finds Freddie and records on tape saying what he had done. However, when the investigator is handing it over in a park, Freddie takes the tape off Viv after a tussle. He leaves her some of the stolen money and without her knowledge plants it in her babies pram. The police then find this and it further incriminates her. The day before the start of Viv's trial, her daughter Donna Windsor-Dingle (Verity Rushworth) and Ross Kirk (Samuel Anderson) see Freddie on a surveillance tape and find out where he lives. They try to talk to him, but he flees. A car chase follows, and while Freddie gets away Donna and Ross are seriously injured in a crash. Viv, guilt-ridden about what happened to her daughter, pleads guilty to fraud, and is sent to prison.

== Jake Doland ==
Jake Doland
- Emmerdale character
- Portrayed by: James Baxter
- Duration: 2007–2009
- First appearance: 30 November 2007
- Last appearance: 17 August 2009
- Introduced by: Keith Richardson
In-universe information
- Occupation: Chef
- Father: Greg Doland
- Stepmother: Melanie Doland
- Half-brothers: Daniel Thomas

Jake Doland is the son of Greg Doland (Shaun Prendergast). He appeared from 2007 to 2009, when his character was axed.

A writer from Holy Soap described Jake's most memorable moment as being the scenes in which he witnessed his stepmother realise her baby was dead.

Jake first appears when visiting the village for the christening of his half brother Arthur (Alfie Clarke) in November 2007. He is also Arthur's godfather.

Jake's mother died when he was a child and Greg married Melanie (Caroline Strong). He returns in January 2008 to help his father re-build Annie's Cottage. Jake does not take to building so when Jack Sugden (Clive Hornby) offers him a job on Butler's Farm, while Andy Sugden (Kelvin Fletcher) was in jail, Jake agrees. Victoria Sugden (Isabel Hodgins) takes a liking to him but he only sees her as a friend. With Andy in prison, Jake is more interested in Jo Stiles (Roxanne Pallett), but Sam Dingle (James Hooton) tells him to leave her alone. Jake continues to work there until Andy fires him in June 2008.

In early 2008, Greg and Mel learn that Arthur may not be their son as the hospital are investigating a possible baby swap. Convinced it is the Thomases' grief talking, Jake helps Greg and Mel go on the run. When thwarted at the airport, Mel disappears with Arthur but keeps in touch with Jake. Greg later finds out and convinces her to come home. Weeks later, DNA test results prove Arthur is Ashley and Laurel's son and custody of him is awarded to the Thomases. Daniel, the Dolands' biological son, died in February 2008. They leave town several weeks later to live in Spain, but Jake decides to stay in Emmerdale.

Jake takes over as head chef at The Woolpack after Marlon Dingle (Mark Charnock) quits in a huff and starts dating Jasmine Thomas (Jenna-Louise Coleman). Marlon is convinced to return and Jake returns to being assistant chef. In October 2008, Jake throws a party in an attempt to help his flagging romance with Jasmine. Unfortunately for Jake, PC Shane Doyle (Paul McEwan) wants Jasmine and ends the party by claiming that there have been complaints about noise and whispers to Jake that he'd slept with Jasmine. A furious Jake attacks him and is arrested. Jasmine tells him she has had enough and ends their relationship. Jake becomes close friends with Daz Eden (Luke Tittensor) and he moves in with Daz when Daz didn't want his girlfriend Scarlett Nicholls (Kelsey-Beth Crossley) to join him.

In mid-2009, Greg asks Jake to join him and Mel in Spain and finds him a job. In August, Lizzie Lakely (Kitty McGeever), who is blind, asks him to scratch a scratchcard for her and tell her if she has won anything – she wins £500 but Eli Dingle (Joseph Gilgun) convinces him to keep quiet and they split the money. Initially Jake agrees and cashes in the scratchcard, but feeling guilty, Jake confessed to Lizzie. Pleased at Jake's honesty, Marlon gave him the money for his flight to Spain.

== Other characters ==
Character	Date(s)	Actor	Circumstances
Jackie Stiles	3–5 January	Ishia Bennison	The mother of Jo Stiles (Roxanne Pallett).
Dan McHerron	14 February-30 May	Patrick Molyneux	The fiancée of Sharon Lambert (Victoria Hawkins), who is a Footballer in the lower English league. Sharon's estranged mother, Val Pollard (Charlie Hardwick) goes to meet her at Skipdale Hall, and later gets very drunk with Dan. When Sharon walks on Val and Dan drunk, a huge arguments starts, where Sharon says that Val slept with her first boyfriend when she was 15 and the boyfriend was 17. Val is thrown out, and is persuaded by local journalist John McNally (Steven Farebrother) to go for a drink with him. The following morning the entire affair is in Hotten Courier. Dan later appears in The Woolpack, having cancelled a date with Sharon the night before saying he had a press conference. However, Rodney Blackstock (Patrick Mower) sees a photo of Dan and two other women in the paper. Val decides not to tell Sharon, however, the wedding ends in disaster and the pair do not marry as Sharon is revealed as a gold digger.
Penny Drury	21 March-21 November	Amelia Sefton	A classmate of Daz Eden (Luke Tittensor). Debbie Dingle (Charley Webb) notices that he fancies Penny, she tries to get him to talk to her, but he cannot build up the confidence. Debbie invites Penny to Daz's birthday party but it is only the two of them there. They end up kissing on the sofa, only to be interrupted by Jack Sugden (Clive Hornby) and Billy Hopwood (David Crellin) arguing over who should look after Daz. Daz intervenes saying they are ruining his birthday and his chance of getting his leg over, causing Penny to leave. Penny returns months later when her father brings his car to Debbie's garage, where Daz works. Penny forgives Daz and the two start dating. After a few months, Penny leaves a glass of vodka and coke lying around at Daz's house, which is found and drunk by Samson Dingle (Sam Hall). When Penny shows no remorse and calls Samson's father Sam (James Hooton) names, Daz dumps her.
Jeff Brannigan	24 April	Ben Keaton	Rita Brannigan's (Emma Kearney) parents. They join Rita and her boyfriend Paddy Kirk (Dominic Brunt) for a meal at the Woolpack. When Jeff and Sue heap praise on Paddy for saving Rita's life from an oncoming car, he is uncomfortable as Rita has been doing the same lately and eventually snaps, which causes Sue to run off crying. Jeff tells Paddy that Rita's sister, Sally had been killed eight months earlier in a hit-and-run accident and Paddy is left feeling guilty.
Sue Brannigan	24 April	Stella Madden	Rita Brannigan's (Emma Kearney) parents. They join Rita and her boyfriend Paddy Kirk (Dominic Brunt) for a meal at the Woolpack. When Jeff and Sue heap praise on Paddy for saving Rita's life from an oncoming car, he is uncomfortable as Rita has been doing the same lately and eventually snaps, which causes Sue to run off crying. Jeff tells Paddy that Rita's sister, Sally had been killed eight months earlier in a hit-and-run accident and Paddy is left feeling guilty.
Errol Michaels	8–20 May	Anthony Booth	The ghost of a homeless man who persuades Bob Hope (Tony Audenshaw) to return home, having left without telling his family, is selling ice-cream. Bob later talks to Errol about his problems at home, and Errol tries to persuade him to go home, or he would regret it, like Errol now does having left home 18 years before. Errol seems often to appear out of nowhere. On 20 May, Bob's wife Viv (Deena Payne) is celebrating her 50th birthday in a park, and Errol persuades an unknowing Bob to go to that park to sell ice-cream. When Viv sees Bob, she runs off, and Errol tells him to go after her. Viv rejects Bob and returns to Emmerdale. Errol and Bob then follow her and he gives Bob some advice. He then says he will walk home, and after saying their goodbyes, Bob turns round, but Errol had disappeared.
Andrea Hayworth	25 June-17 August	Cathy Tyson	The neighbour of Duke Woods (Dicken Ashworth) who meets Terry Woods (Billy Hartman) visits his father, after hearing he was in hospital. Andrea tells Terry that Duke is in prison after punching a local hooligan. Andrea and Terry go to the prison to collect Duke, and she mediates between the two, who had been estranged for some time. She persuades Duke to go and stay with Terry for a while. She has a brief relationship with Terry. She reappears in the village and tells Duke that she has a new job and she and her son, Ryan (Reece Noi) are moving to Sheffield.
Ryan Hayworth	17 July-25 January 2008	Reece Noi	The son of Andrea Hayworth (Cathy Tyson), who lives next door to Duke Woods (Dicken Ashworth), the father of Terry Woods (Billy Hartman). He gets on well with Duke, who is persuaded by Andrea and Terry to go and live with Terry in Emmerdale. In August 2007, he has a failed trial with York City F.C. In early 2008, Ryan arrives in the village and tells Duke about his problems with his mother's new boyfriend. Terry later tells Duke that Ryan needs him, and Duke leaves the village to be nearer him.
Colin McFarlane	31 July-1 August	Michael Melia	A businessman who sleeps with Chas Dingle (Lucy Pargeter). She and Lexi Nicholls (Sally Oliver) are in an upmarket hotel and when they see Colin, they decide to have a bet - who can sleep with Colin. The loser will have to pay for their room there. Lexi soon gets drunk, and turns Colin off, however Chas makes her move and the two go to his room. The following morning, Chas wakes up in Colin's bed to find he has died. She and Lexi decide to make a run for it, although Lexi steals his wallet. The police later question them, while Colin's wife Brenda (Judy Holt) thanks them for killing her husband.
Kirsty Rayfield	24 October-28 November	Ruth Westley	The girlfriend of Ross Kirk (Samuel Anderson).
