= Scarlett Nicholls =

Fictional character from Emmerdale

- Emmerdale character
- Portrayed by: Kelsey-Beth Crossley
- Duration: 2007–2012
- First appearance: 2 March 2007
- Last appearance: 20 November 2012
- Created by: Kathleen Beedles (2007); Stuart Blackburn (2012)
In-universe information
- Occupation: Student; Businesswoman; PR consultant
- Family: King
- Father: Tom King
- Mother: Carrie Nicholls
- Stepfather: Nick Baine
- Stepmother: Rosemary King
- Half-brothers: Jimmy King; Matthew King; Carl King; Max King
- Half-sisters: Lexi King
- Grandfathers: Albert King
- Nephews: Thomas King; Elliot Windsor; Carl Holliday
- Nieces: Anya King; Angelica King

Scarlett Mary Nicholls is a fictional character from the British ITV soap opera Emmerdale. She is played by Kelsey-Beth Crossley and made her first appearance on 2 March 2007. It was announced on 8 May 2011 that Crossley was leaving the show. She made her final appearance on 28 July 2011. On 21 October 2012, it was announced Crossley would make a brief return to Emmerdale.

== Storylines ==
=== Background ===
Scarlett is the only daughter of millionaire Tom King (Ken Farrington) and Carrie Nicholls (Linda Lusardi). Carrie was a nurse taking care of Tom's wife, Mary, as she was dying of cancer and their relationship continued after Mary's death, resulting in Carrie getting pregnant. After Scarlett was born, Tom ended the relationship but offered to provide financial support for Carrie secretly. Carrie refused this but allowed Tom to finance Scarlett attending a private girls' school.

=== 2007–2012 ===
Following Tom's murder on Christmas Day 2006, he left 10% of King & Sons and 25% of Home Farm, to Scarlett Mary Nicholls, much to his sons' surprise. Jimmy (Nick Miles) realised that she was their half-sister, shocking him and his brothers. Carrie confirmed Jimmy's suspicions and told them that she and Tom had had a relationship but Tom refused to acknowledge Scarlett or tell them about his new relationship, worried about how his sons would react. Each of Tom's sons reacted differently. Jimmy wanted to get to know Scarlett, Matthew (Matt Healy) wanted to buy her out and Carl (Tom Lister) saw her existence as a betrayal of his mother's memory.

Carrie was outraged to learn that the King brothers had been charged with their father's murder, demanding they stay away from Scarlett and buy her out as she was Scarlett's trustee, delighting Matthew. He wanted the shares cheap and to make sure he'd get them, he cancelled all payments to Carrie, including Scarlett's school fees, prompting an argument when Carrie learned of this. She told Scarlett to stay in the car but Scarlett recognised Jimmy and followed him, only to hear Carrie refer to her as their "flesh and blood". She promptly burst into the room and demanded an explanation. Jimmy told her that she was their half-sister but had only just learned of her existence. Shocked, Scarlett ran away and Jimmy followed her, finding her on the main road. He took her to visit Tom's grave and told her that their father was "a good man". On returning to Pear Tree Cottage, Scarlett asked Carrie why she had not told her that she had four brothers and Carrie replied that they were due to stand trial for conspiracy to murder her father. Shocked, Scarlett left with Carrie. Jimmy reassured her it was not true and they became close, Scarlett was also keen to get to know Matthew and Carl, much to Carrie's dismay.

On one of Scarlett's first visits to the village, she met Daz Eden (Luke Tittensor). She fell in love with him but he saw her as a friend and started dating his classmate, Penny Drury. Scarlett was heartbroken when she found out and pined for Daz, much to Victoria Sugden's (Isabel Hodgins) amusement. When Daz found out that Penny and Victoria had made fun of Scarlett, he was angry and went looking for Scarlett. On finding her, he made it clear he was flattered but he was still dating Penny.

A few months later, Scarlett's aunt, Lexi (Sally Oliver) visited Carrie and Scarlett. Scarlett loved and admired Lexi but Carrie was indifferent and was shocked to discover that Lexi spent a year in prison in Mexico for drug trafficking. Scarlett was more concerned. The situation was tense between Carrie and Lexi and during a heated argument, Lexi told Carrie she knew that Carrie was her birth mother. Carrie refused to confirm that she was Lexi's mother, so she left. When Lexi returned, Scarlett learnt that Lexi was her half-sister and her aunt by adoption. She was horrified to learn that her mother had kept another secret from her as she had gone from being an only child to suddenly being the youngest of six. Eventually, Scarlett forgave Carrie and recognised Lexi as her sister and they lived together until Carrie moved to Canada in February 2008.

Scarlett still had feelings for Daz and was happy to hear that he and Penny had split up. Persuaded by Lexi and Scarlett, Carrie and Jimmy agreed Scarlett could have a small party with a few friends. Victoria, however, posted news of the party on the Internet so many people came to Home Farm. Scarlett got drunk and told Daz she loved him, dragging him on to the sofa and kissing him, until they were interrupted by Jimmy and Carrie. Jimmy was enraged and chased Daz down the driveway but Lexi persuaded Jimmy to let Scarlett and Daz start dating and Jimmy wanted Daz to take Scarlett to nice places so he gave him money but Scarlett was humiliated when she found out. Carrie's relationship with Jimmy didn't last and she chose to emigrate to Canada but Scarlett stayed with Lexi and Daz. On Daz's birthday, Scarlett picked out a beautiful necklace for him but was mortified when the necklace was swapped for a red camouflage thong by Debbie Dingle (Charley Webb). He revealed his feelings for her and they started dating properly. Lexi tried to take over as Scarlett's trustee, jealous of her younger sister's trust fund and determined to get some herself, but Matthew was appointed her new trustee. Disappointed in her older sister when this was revealed, Scarlett insisted on moving into Home Farm with her brothers.

On Scarlett's return from visiting Carrie in Canada, she lost interest in school, feeling her trust fund would get her through life. When she failed her GCSEs, Jimmy insisted she do resits. At Daz's suggestion, Scarlett bribed Zak Dingle (Steve Halliwell) to take her shopping instead of to college. When Jimmy and Zak's granddaughter, Debbie, found out, Jimmy almost cancelled his contract with Debbie and Debbie nearly fired Zak. This made Scarlett see the consequences of her behaviour and pledged to become more attentive to her education. Things went well for Scarlett and Daz until she discovered he was having trouble paying his rent. She offered to have a word with Carl, Daz's landlord, but Daz refused so she suggested she move in, telling him that she could get round Jimmy. Daz, however, didn't feel ready for that so he asked Jake Doland (James Baxter) to move in instead as he was homeless. Jake suggested making the place a mess and then Scarlett would not want to move in. Jake was proved right when Scarlett reacted with horror at the mess.

In December 2008, Scarlett's life fell to pieces when the bank got a court order to wind up King and Sons, due to their debts. On Matthew and Anna De Souza's (Emma Davies) wedding day, Carl visited their solicitor who revealed Donald De Souza (Michael Jayston), was responsible for their troubles. Donald had recently died, leaving Anna an interest in his company, making Carl realise that Matthew, as her husband, would also gain from the company's failing. This led to Carl and Matthew fighting and ended in Matthew's death when he tried to run Carl over in a van. Following this, Scarlett, Carl and Jimmy were questioned and spent the night at the police station. The following day, she and her family were evicted from Home Farm and moved into Mill Cottage, which Carl owned. Scarlett argued with Carl as she was upset by Matthew's death and the family's money problems but Carl thought she only cared about her trust fund being reduced so she offered it to them. Jimmy refused to take it, however, telling Scarlett that Tom had left it to her and it was not enough anyway. As she and Lexi packed up their possessions, Scarlett told Lexi that she wanted to join Carrie in Canada but Lexi told her that, given recent events, it was not a good time to make big decisions and suggested that she stay until after Christmas. In January, Scarlett agreed to give life in the village a second chance when Carl started a new company and she decided to help him.

Carl bought a truck and started Emmerdale Haulage and Scarlett began work as his personal assistant. After being accidentally shot, Jimmy received £10,000 compensation if he agreed not to press charges and also began working at the new company and took over as Scarlett's trustee. Lexi, worried about her relationship with Carl, proposed marriage. The wedding date was set for 31 March and Lexi asked Scarlett to be her bridesmaid. Scarlett was thrilled and accepted.

In April, Scarlett and Daz went to Dublin for the weekend but the trip was unsuccessful as Daz was worried about Victoria possibly being pregnant, following a one night stand. When challenged, she admitted it was a false alarm but Scarlett was devastated to learn that Daz had cheated on her and ended their relationship. Jimmy, Carl and Lexi knew there was a problem but Scarlett refused to explain. Daz's half-brother, Andy Sugden (Kelvin Fletcher), asked Scarlett not to tell anyone and she agreed. Daz later left the village after Andy threw him out.

In June, Scarlett discovered that Lexi and Carl were trying for a baby and by July, Lexi was pregnant but the pregnancy was ectopic. Following losing the baby and further tests to assess the damage, Lexi was told that she was unlikely to conceive again without IVF as her remaining fallopian tube was blocked. Scarlett and Jimmy's girlfriend, Nicola De Souza (Nicola Wheeler), supported her and Scarlett offered to pay for them to go private and Lexi agreed. Carl, however, was not keen and persuaded Lexi that them being together was more important but Lexi was more hurt by this than she admitted. Nicola tried to comfort her but this ended in them arguing and Nicola fell down the stairs and was rushed to hospital, where she gave birth to her and Jimmy's daughter, Angelica. Following another argument with Carl, Lexi left him and went to Canada. Scarlett joined her at their mother's and returned to Emmerdale in September to find that Carl had moved his new girlfriend, Chas Dingle (Lucy Pargeter), in and Jimmy, Nicola, Angelica living at Mill Cottage. Nicola and Scarlett were disgusted with Carl's behaviour and behaved so badly to Chas that Carl lost his temper and demanded they either accept her or move out. They accepted Chas and made an effort to get on.

In December, Scarlett celebrated her 18th birthday. Realising that Nicola was planning to spend her inheritance for her, she said she was reinvesting it until she was 21. Nicola was furious but Scarlett told Jimmy that she had her inheritance but did not want Nicola to know. Nicola softened a little when Scarlett said she would set some money aside for Angelica but was angered when Scarlett said it would be invested until Angelica's 16th birthday. Towards the end of the month, Scarlett began dating Adam Barton (Adam Thomas).

In August 2010, Scarlett quits her job working for Carl, feeling that he was patronising her and started her own business with Eve Jenson (Suzanne Shaw) organising parties and hen nights. In September, Scarlett learns about Holly Barton's (Sophie Powles) drug problem after Holly stole her purse. Scarlett does her best to support Adam and helps the Bartons find Holly in Hotten after she runs away from home.

In December 2010, after learning of Carl and Eve's affair, Scarlett moves out of Mill Cottage and asks Adam to move in with her, intending to buy a house for them, but Adam is not keen. On New Year's Eve, Scarlett sees Adam kissing Mia Macey (Sapphire Elia), and after a brief argument, Scarlett slaps Mia. On 3 January 2011, Adam visits Scarlett and they reconcile briefly, but he tells her that their relationship is not working and ends it. The following day, Scarlett decides to visit her mother and tells Nicola and Jimmy that she is over Adam. As they are about to leave for the airport, they see Adam and Mia. Jimmy loses his temper, angrily confronts Adam, and goes to hit him, but Scarlett and Nicola stop him before they leave for the airport. Scarlett returns to the village in February 2011 and is concerned when Jimmy goes missing. She is relieved when Jimmy is found, suffering from amnesia. Scarlett tries to help Jimmy get his memory back. When Jimmy's ex-fiancée, Kelly Windsor (Adele Silva), returns to the village, Scarlett is pleased to see her and defends her when Jimmy asks about Kelly's aborting their child. Scarlett is disappointed when it is revealed that Kelly attacked Jimmy and caused his memory loss. He insists that he does not owe Kelly anything but he refuses to report her to the police as he blackmailed her not to report Nicola to the police for attacking her.

In July, Carl asks Scarlett for money to fund Chas's son, Aaron Livesy's (Danny Miller), defence barrister when he is accused of murder but Aaron and Chas reject his offer so Carl spends it on new vehicles for the business and expands the firm. Scarlett is angry and feels betrayed by Carl. Matters worsen when Jimmy looks at her paperwork and realises that her business is struggling and she is using her own money to prop up her business. Scarlett reluctantly admits that her business is doing badly and is angered when Jimmy suggests Carl's actions were for the best as this gives her a bigger stake in his business. Scarlett now feels that there is nothing left for her in Emmerdale and Adam convinces her to live life to the full so she books flight tickets and tells her brothers that she is going on holiday to Mexico before joining her mother in Canada. Jimmy attempts to convince her to stay but is unsuccessful and he wishes her well. Scarlett bids farewell to Chas, Eve and Eve's great aunt Edna Birch (Shirley Stelfox) and Carl apologizes for using her money. He also wishes her well and tells her to be good before Jimmy takes her to the airport.

Scarlett returns to the village in October 2012, following Carl's murder. She arrives in the offices of the haulage firm and is shocked to discover Charity Sharma (Emma Atkins) has bought into the business. Rodney Blackstock (Patrick Mower) fills Scarlett in on what has occurred since she left. Robbie Lawson (Jamie Shelton) flirts with Scarlett in the cafe and she catches up with Adam. The night before Carl's funeral, Jimmy gets drunk and tells a shocked Scarlett that Carl killed their father. Scarlett is disappointed that Jimmy had not told her sooner but forgives him. Scarlett attends Carl's funeral and is comforted by Nicola during the service. Scarlett chooses to stay in the village to support Jimmy against Charity, who is attempting to convince him to sell his share of the business to her.

Eventually, Jimmy changes his mind about selling the business, infuriating Charity. Scarlett and Jimmy celebrate. The following day, Scarlett gets ready to return to Canada. Nicola thanks her for her efforts to help and Scarlett invites them to come and visit her in Canada and bring Angelica with them. Jimmy bids her farewell and she gets a taxi to the airport.

== Development ==
In May 2011, Kelsey-Beth Crossley confirmed that she was leaving the show. Crossley revealed via her Twitter page that she was waiting for news on an audition. The 18-year-old posted: "The most stressful part of auditions is waiting for a verdict! Ahh ha! X (sic)." When asked if this meant she was leaving Emmerdale, Crossley confirmed that she would be exiting the show. After a series of well wishers contacted her, she added: "Thanks guys, had to announce because I didn't know how to reply to the tweets asking about storylines. Love you all and the support xxxxxx."

On 21 October 2012, Daniel Kilkelly from Digital Spy reported that Crossley would reprise her role for a brief return in November.

== See also ==
- King family
