= Debbie Dingle =

Fictional character from Emmerdale

- Emmerdale character
- Portrayed by: Charley Webb
- Duration: 2002–2021
- First appearance: Episode 3337; 24 December 2002
- Last appearance: Episode 8967; 11 February 2021
- Introduced by: Steve Frost
In-universe information
- Other names: Debbie Jones
- Occupation: Business owner; Taxi driver; Mechanic; Personal assistant
- Father: Cain Dingle
- Mother: Charity Dingle
- Stepfather: Chris Tate; Jai Sharma; Declan Macey
- Stepmother: Moira Dingle
- Half-brothers: Ryan Stocks; Nate Robinson; Noah Dingle; Kyle Dingle; Moses Dingle; Isaac Dingle
- Half-sisters: Leyla Sugden
- Husband: Pete Barton (2015–2016); Chris (2025–present)
- Sons: Jack Sugden
- Daughters: Sarah Sugden
- Granddaughters: Leyla Sugden (adoptive)
- Grandfathers: Zak Dingle; Obadiah Dingle
- Grandmothers: Faith Dingle
- Uncles: Sam Dingle; Butch Dingle; Ben Dingle; Caleb Miligan
- Aunts: Belle Dingle; Chas Dingle; Tina Dingle
- Nephews: Oscar Grisham
- Nieces: Frankie Robinson
- First cousins: Aaron Dingle; Samson Dingle; Nicky Miligan; Vinny Dingle; Eve Dingle; Steph Miligan (adoptive)
- Other relatives: Shadrach Dingle; Marlon Dingle; Eli Dingle; Gennie Walker; Mandy Dingle; Albert Dingle; Del Dingle; Lilith Dingle; Molly Sharma; April Windsor; Leo Goskirk; Bert Dingle; Elvis Dingle; Solomon Dingle

Debbie Dingle (also Jones and Barton) is a fictional character from the British ITV soap opera Emmerdale, played by Charley Webb. Webb has taken maternity leave three times, with the first time being in 2010, and the second in 2016, with Debbie departing on 1 January 2016. She returned on 24 January 2017, and then went on maternity leave for a third time in 2019, with Debbie leaving for Scotland on 13 August 2019. She returned for a short stint on 25 December 2020, and made her final appearance on 11 February 2021.

Debbie was introduced as the foster child of Paddy Kirk (Dominic Brunt) and Emily Kirk (Kate McGregor) before being revealed as the daughter of Charity Dingle (Emma Atkins) and Cain Dingle (Jeff Hordley). She has featured in many storylines on Emmerdale, including her relationships with Andy Sugden (Kelvin Fletcher) (which lead to her pregnancy at the age of 15), Jasmine Thomas (Jenna-Louise Coleman) and Scott Windsor (Ben Freeman); her daughter Sarah being diagnosed with a blood disorder; her disastrous relationship with Cameron Murray (Carl King's, Alex Moss's, and Gennie Walker's real killer) (Dominic Power), which sparked the 2013 week of episodes known as "The Woolpack Siege"; a relationship with Pete (Anthony Quinlan), who she later marries, and her affair with Ross (Michael Parr); a relationship with Joe Tate (Ned Porteous), and being conned by him; accidentally having Ross as the victim of an acid attack; learning Sarah suffers from heart failure and needs a transplant; and dealing with the false revelation that Cain killed Joe.

== Development ==
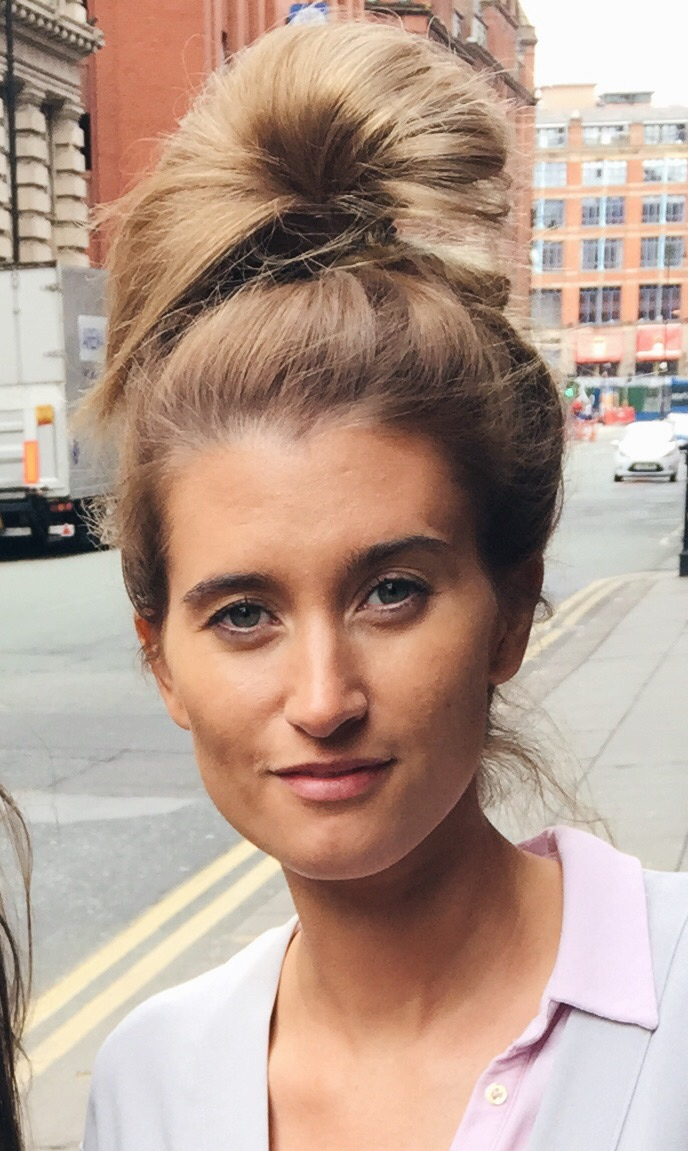
Charley Webb portrays Debbie.

=== Characterisation ===
Debbie is a self-sufficient Dingle and in many ways her mother's daughter. Despite a rocky start in life she's done well for herself, running her own business and acquiring custody of daughter Sarah. Like most of the Dingles she has been involved in lots of scams and money is important to her. Sometimes she feels like she ends up parenting Cain and Charity and she's not afraid to tell them what's what. She does have a more vulnerable side which comes out when she’s in a relationship.

— itv.com on Debbie..

Webb told Gemma Graham from TV Buzz that the reason she "loves" playing Debbie is that she has always been a fighter. "Nothing will knock her down and if it does she'll get back up again". Webb said that she would not pick a fight with Debbie because she would win "any day".

In one storyline Debbie takes part in a jewellery heist with the help of Chastity Dingle (Lucy Pargeter) and Lexi Nicholls (Sally Oliver). Lexi is given a bracelet at a sale and pretends she has stolen it to impress Debbie. Oliver told Kris Green of Digital Spy that Debbie thinks that stealing jewellery must be easy. Debbie thinks of a "big master plan" and they attend a party at Home Farm. The three females "dress up-the-nines" in "camp costumes". Debbie gets Chas and Lexi to cause a diversion while she steals an expensive necklace. Oliver said that over the following episodes viewers found out what really happened with the necklace and what they plan to do with it. Debbie's attitude causes Lexi to become suspicious; Oliver said that Lexi "wants the necklace straight back, it's not the sort of thing she's going to take lightly." Debbie starts plotting to sell the necklace and keep the proceeds for herself. Oliver said Debbie swaps the necklace for a fake and makes Chas and Lexi think she has lost it. The production team did not use real diamonds in the storyline and opted for plastic glass. Oliver said that she did not think they would get away with the scam.

=== Temporary departure ===
In June 2015, Webb announced she was pregnant with her second child and took her maternity leave later that year. Debbie departed on 1 January 2016 and it was confirmed in December 2016 that Webb will make her return in January 2017. Her return scenes aired on 24 January 2017.

=== Maternity leave and departure (2019, 2021) ===
In 2019, it was announced that Webb would be taking maternity leave for a third time; her return scenes aired in December 2020. Her exit scenes aired in February 2021; Webb's husband Wolfenden has stated that she would only reprise her role once the COVID-19 pandemic protocols in place on the soap were retired, but confirmed that she had no plans to return. Later that year, Wolfenden was accused of mimicking the accent of a mixed race actress on set. An investigation into the accusations was launched and Webb was reported to have sided with Wolfenden. Webb subsequently made the decision to leave Emmerdale permanently.

== Storylines ==
Upon arriving in Emmerdale in December 2002, Debbie was fostered by Paddy (Dominic Brunt) and Emily Kirk (Kate McGregor). When Debbie shows Sam Dingle (James Hooton) a photograph of her biological mother, he recognizes the young woman as his cousin, Charity Dingle (Emma Atkins). They eventually meet and she gets close to her stepfather, Chris Tate (Peter Amory), but after meeting her biological father, Cain Dingle (Jeff Hordley), the trio become a family and Chris is sidelined. This affects him extremely, resulting in him cancelling plans to adopt Debbie.

Debbie, Charity and Cain move into Pear Tree Cottage and live together until Charity is found guilty of Chris's murder, so she and Cain move in with the Dingles. When the house becomes over-crowded, she and Cain move in with Andy Sugden (Kelvin Fletcher) and Daz Eden (Luke Tittensor). Debbie's behaviour becomes erratic as she shows an interest in glamour and boys, resulting in her capturing Daz's affections. Debbie, however, prefers Andy and local curate, Ethan Blake (Liam O'Brien), who is engaged to Niamh O'Connor (Tracey Moore). Debbie loses her virginity to Andy and he tells her that he has a crush on her. They begin dating, until Charity and Cain find out. Charity accepts the relationship but Cain disapproves and blackmails Andy into ending it, unaware that Debbie is pregnant. Andy's wife Katie Sugden (Sammy Winward) had discover her affair with Andy and was pregnant with his child, causing angry at her and nearly divorce with him. Distraught, she hides it and plans to abandon the baby after giving birth but Daz sees her bump. Daz is with her as she gives birth and names her daughter, Sarah. Debbie and Andy reunite briefly but it is short-lived and his brother, Robert Sugden (Karl Davies), becomes romantically involved with Debbie. She, however, is unaware that he has an ulterior motive until he ends the relationship when Debbie tells him that she feels baby Sarah should stay with the Dingles while they go travelling. He then tells her that he wanted Sarah, not her. Feeling unable to cope with motherhood and knowing that Emily is leaving, she asks her to take Sarah. The Dingles are horrified so she moves in with Ashley Thomas (John Middleton), where she makes friends with Jasmine Thomas (Jenna-Louise Coleman). Debbie confesses her love for Jasmine and they date for a while until Cain deliberately tempts Jasmine into sleeping with him. Wanting to hurt her, he makes sure Debbie sees them together. Debbie and Jasmine break up for a while but reconcile when Debbie learns that Jasmine is pregnant and wants an abortion. Sadie King (Patsy Kensit) pays for her to go private and Debbie, knowing that Cain wants another child, tells him this, leading him to kidnap Sadie and Tom King (Ken Farrington) for financial gain to start a new life. Debbie tries to convince Cain to stay but he leaves and gives her money.

Emily returns Sarah to Andy and Debbie tells Andy that she does not want to be a mother. Lisa Dingle (Jane Cox) deliberately asks Debbie to visit when Sarah is there, hoping to create a mother-daughter relationship. She's successful and Debbie asks Andy for access but he refuses. Debbie briefly dates Scott Windsor (Ben Freeman). Debbie gets Eli Dingle (Joe Gilgun) to pose as Scott so she can get a bank loan. Debbie, Chas Dingle (Lucy Pargeter) and Lexi King (Sally Oliver) decide to stage a jewellery scam at Home Farm so they can steal a valuable necklace and share the proceeds. Debbie wants more money so she gets Eric Pollard (Chris Chittell) to help scam Chas and Lexi but Lexi discovers the truth and the pair fight in the street, accidentally dropping the necklace down a drain.

When Andy is sent to prison, Jo Stiles (Roxanne Pallett), Andy's ex-wife, asks Debbie to look after Sarah, which Debbie enjoys. Debbie discovers that Andy is hitting Jo and worries about Sarah's safety. Debbie gives Jo money so she and Sarah can leave but Jo stays and allows Andy to see Sarah again, annoying Debbie. However, this does not last long as Jo leaves Sarah with Debbie and the Dingles as Debbie gets involved in the murder of PC Shane Doyle (Paul McEwan), Jasmine's ex-boyfriend. Jasmine is the real culprit as she killed him to save Debbie. She, Debbie and Eli attempt to conceal what they'd done but Jasmine wants to confess especially after Ross Kirk (Samuel Anderson) is charged with his murder. Debbie persuades her not to and they start dating again. They decide to run away together but the police catch Debbie and arrest her. With Jasmine on the run; Debbie is left to take the blame for the murder. Eli enlists Danielle Hutch to harm Debbie, so she is sent to hospital as part of a rescue attempt but Debbie refuses to go. At Debbie's court hearing, Jasmine arrives and admits murdering Shane. Debbie and Jasmine are found guilty and Debbie is released because of time served and her time in prison has made her realize that she wants Sarah back. Natasha Wylde (Amanda Donohoe), concerned about Andy's reputation now that he is dating her daughter, Maisie, pays for Debbie to sue Andy for custody. However, Maisie Wylde (Alice Coulthard) does not approve. Maisie and Debbie have a fight and Debbie thinks that she has ruined her chances but Maisie ends her relationship with Andy so she will not be involved. Cain helps by asking Aaron Livesy (Danny Miller) to help. Aaron is dating Andy's sister, Victoria, and he persuades her to play truant from school and steal from local shops. Cain reports Andy to social services, informing them of Victoria's behaviour and his past domestic abuse. The social worker is concerned about Andy's ability to run the farm and look after Victoria and Sarah even before Jo confirms the domestic abuse allegation so Andy withdraws his claim for residency and Debbie is awarded sole residency.

Debbie dates Michael Conway but he admits that he already has a girlfriend and they are due to marry within days. He insists that he loves Debbie so she tells him to call off his wedding but he cannot because his fiancée is pregnant. On attending the wedding, Debbie and Cain are shocked to discover that his bride is Charity. He calls the wedding off, wanting Debbie back, but she ignores him, choosing to build relationships with Charity and Noah instead until she catches Charity stealing Cain's money. Cain and Charity later reconcile but annoyed at their inability to get along, Debbie takes a job in Jersey. She returns months later and moves back in with her parents. Later she reveals that her boss tried to take advantage of her and she got revenge by humiliating him and stealing money. Debbie starts a new relationship with Cameron Murray (Dominic Power), a man she previously had an affair with in Jersey, and discovers she is pregnant but has a miscarriage and is annoyed that Cameron doesn't seem bothered.

Sarah is diagnosed with a blood disorder, fanconi anaemia. Debbie and Andy decide to have a child together to create a bone marrow donor. Cameron and Andy's girlfriend, Alicia Gallagher (Natalie Anderson), are uncomfortable with the idea but Debbie and Andy go ahead. When they are refused IVF and artificial insemination attempts are unsuccessful, Debbie sleeps with Andy and is overjoyed to discover that she is pregnant but Cameron has had enough and leaves. Charity, thinking it was artificial insemination, persuades him to give Debbie another chance but Andy tells Cameron the truth. Debbie begs Cameron to stay, for Sarah's sake as well as hers. Andy and Debbie learn that the baby is a match for Sarah after a CVS test. Cameron and Debbie reunite after Debbie admits he is the only person she has ever truly loved. Cameron starts an affair with Chas. Cain and Debbie become suspicious and confront Cameron, he lashes out at Cain but accidentally hits Debbie. She hits her head and fears she may lose her baby. Back home, Sarah asks if her brother still has "the magic potion" to save her and Debbie is tearful as she realizes how much Sarah wants her brother and how hurt she would be if anything happened to him. This, however, brings Cameron to his senses as he realizes how much he loves Debbie.

Debbie is angry when Cameron forgets to check on Sarah when she is ill because he is on the phone to Carl about the £30,000 Carl is blackmailing them for. Meanwhile, Debbie gets home from shopping with Charity to find that Sarah has collapsed. When rushed to hospital, Debbie, Cameron, Charity and Victoria discover Sarah is in a pre-leukaemic state. Debbie demands to be induced but is refused, as her son will be premature, and could die. Debbie gave birth to a boy called Jack. When Debbie returns from hospital, she is unaware that Cameron killed Carl King (Tom Lister) the night before. Debbie finds messages from Carl on her phone which reveal Chas and Cameron's affair so Debbie throws Cameron out before showing the pictures to Cain and Charity. Cameron begs Chas to leave but they are stopped by Charity, Cain, Debbie and Zak. Cameron stands by Chas and declared his love for her in front of Debbie. As revenge, Debbie set fire to his possessions and trashes his truck.

Debbie decides to set up a delivery firm, sleeping with newcomer Dom (Wil Johnson) to get his contacts. Dom's boss, Pete, tries to get Debbie to do drugs runs for him and threatens Sarah, so Debbie terminates the contract. Debbie hires Robbie Lawson (Jamie Shelton) as her assistant and they begin selling cheap vodka. Debbie and Robbie set up a meeting with an old friend of Robbie's, Kirk, who is very interested in Debbie. Jack and Sarah almost die when Andy's girlfriend, Kerry Wyatt (Laura Norton), accidentally sets fire to Dale View. Debbie swore to pay Kerry back and almost kills her in the street. Kirk's interest in Debbie continues even though Robbie reveals he is engaged to another woman. Debbie becomes wary when Robbie kisses, remembering previous times with engaged men. Debbie gets closer to Belle and is horrified when she drinks half a bottle of her dodgy vodka and is left with possible brain damage. The Dingles throw Debbie out and Andy takes the children away. She stays with Zak, gets her life back on track and gets closer to Cameron when he comforts herm and the pair sleep together. Just after sleeping with Cameron, he tells Debbie "that it felt right" in his opinion, and she is horrified that he wants to cheat on Chas. Cameron continues to fight for Debbie and after she angrily admits trying to kill Chas, Cameron realizes that it took a lot for her to confess, so he thinks she still trusts him. He follows her home, unaware that Gennie is hidden upstairs with a dictophone, taping their conversation. Cameron confesses that he killed Carl. Debbie says she still loves him and they can get through it together, as she believed that he was with Chas while she was giving birth to Jack, but realizes that Cameron was "threatened" by Carl and killed him in "self-defence". Debbie and Cameron kiss and head to tell Chas they are back together and they notice Gennie leave Tug Ghyll. The pair chase her, leading to Gennie's car crashing down a ravine. Cameron pulls a hurt Gennie out of the car and kills her while an unaware Debbie calling an ambulance, not realising Cameron's crime.

Cameron's murderous crimes are exposed by Debbie and Chas after finding Gennie's Dictaphone. Cameron holds Debbie hostage and threatens to have her killed but he is injured when he falls down the stairs. Debbie escapes while Cameron is arrested. A month later, he manages to escape for jail and Debbie, Chas and the other villagers panic. Cameron takes Sarah and locks her in a barn, assuring her he will get Debbie and Jack, and go away as a family. Debbie and other villagers are in The Woolpack when she learns Sarah has been found by Andy and Moira, but Cameron breaks into the Woolpack, taking everyone hostage. He knocks Marlon unconscious and leaves him in the cellar, where the flood water rises. Cameron lets the villagers out except Debbie and Chas. After being hit by Marlon after he regained consciousness, Debbie and Chas rush to the cellar, followed by Cameron. He insists that he and Debbie will drown together but Debbie and Chas manage to escape. Trying to pull Debbie back in, he fails but grabs a light bulb and electrocutes himself.

Debbie moves on from Cameron after a new employee at Dingle Automotives, Ross Barton (Michael Parr), makes a clumsy pass at her, she attacks him when he touches her arm. He constantly attempts to impress her but always fails. When his brother, Pete (Anthony Quinlan), thinks Ross is harassing her, he attacks Ross. An angry Ross later sets up Pete's car so he cannot go to a meeting, so Debbie comes out in the recovery vehicle. They realize their attraction to each other and kiss. They have sex, but when Pete mentions Cameron, Debbie tells him to get lost. She tries to ignore him, but Chas persuades Debbie to try and leave Cameron in the past and make up with Pete. Debbie and Pete begin a secret relationship, but a jealous Ross soon finds out. When he deliberately damages Ashley's car after an argument at the garage, Debbie insists he must pay to repair the damage himself. Ross later buys dodgy flash cars for Debbie to try and win her affections, but furious, she insists he get rid of them before her father finds out. He sells them and gives the money to her. Debbie briefly ends her relationship with Pete when he tries to insist she see someone about getting over what Cameron did to her. When Alistair Harper, a man on a callout, comes onto her, she ends up stabbing him in the leg with a screwdriver. She's arrested for assault but is let out on bail. She admits that she's still vulnerable to Pete who confronts Harper in hospital and threatens him to drop the charges. After discovering this, Debbie kisses him and they get back together.

Debbie becomes guardian to Charity's baby son while Charity is in prison. The Dingles name the baby Moses. While leaving Moses in Pete's care, Debbie begins an affair with Ross. Ross, however, is later revealed to be the father of Moses. Debbie is unaware of this and continues sleeping with him. Debbie and Pete later plan to marry in August but Debbie and Ross intend to run away together a few days before. There plan is discovered by Cain and ruined as he reveals to Debbie that Ross is Moses' father. Debbie then orders Cain to dispose of Ross, so he leaves him in a locked van on the edge of a cliff. Debbie and Pete get married, but he learns about her affair with Ross due to Ross recording a conversation with Debbie which was accidentally played as Chas, thinking it was the first wedding song. Pete is furious with Debbie, but moments later a helicopter damaged by an explosion caused by Chrissie White (Louise Marwood) crashes into the village hall, killing Val Pollard (Charlie Hardwick) and Ruby Haswell (Alicya Eyo). Debbie is found under collapsed debris and fights for her life. Debbie is on life support and wakes up later, and she begs for Pete's forgiveness. Debbie later comes home but Pete cannot cope with his guilt and tells Debbie he killed Ross, shocking her. Ross is then revealed to be alive, determined to win back Debbie. They later begin a relationship. Debbie leaves after learning Ross shot Robert (now Ryan Hawley) and that Andy was involved.

In January 2017, Cain is watching the news and spots Debbie and her children on the run after stealing a car with 50,000 euros in it and committing a hit and run. Debbie returns to the village with French and English police looking for her. She tells Charity and Cain the hit and run wasn't her and must've happened before she stole the car. Two men then turn up at the Dingles, and after tying up Sam, they kidnap Sarah and Jack, and demand £50,000 by later that evening. Debbie, Cain, Charity, and Ross manage to acquire the money. The men get their money and return Sarah and Jack in a tense standoff. Debbie reveals she needs the money for Sarah's medical treatment as she has been diagnosed with cancer. Debbie tells everyone that she is taking Sarah to Prague for her treatment, which is met with her families doubt on whether she will make it out of the country without being arrested, so Sarah is taken by Charity.

Debbie later begins a relationship with businessman "Tom Waterhouse" (Ned Porteous) after he buys her a new car, but he is revealed to be Joe Tate, Chris' son and Debbie's former stepbrother, who blames Charity for Chris' death. He starts feuding with the Dingles and she soon learns that Tom has invested in a golf course that will be built on the Dingles' cottage which Joe demolishes. Debbie pays drug dealer Simon McManus (Liam Ainsworth) to physically attack Joe and when Simon sees Ross stepping out of Joe's car, he believes Ross is Joe and throws acid in Ross' face, however Debbie begins a relationship with Joe. Debbie is arrested for the crime but found not guilty.

== Reception ==
For her portrayal of Debbie, Webb won the "Best Young Actor" award at the 2005 Inside Soap Awards. In 2007, Webb was nominated for "Best Actress" at the British Soap Awards and the Inside Soap Awards. On Digital Spy's 2012 end of year reader poll, Chas and Cameron's affair and the subsequent effect on Debbie was voted fourth in the "Best Storyline" category, receiving 8.9% of the vote. Webb told Gemma Graham from TV Buzz that the reason she "loves" playing Debbie is the fact she has always been a fighter. "Nothing will knock her down and if it does she'll get back up again". Webb said that she would not pick a fight with Debbie because she would win "any day". Webb was nominated for the Best Actress award and the Villain of the Year award at The British Soap Awards 2013, and has been nominated for the Best Actress award again in 2014.

Kris Green of Digital Spy said that he thought the jewellery heist storyline was inspired by the 2000 Millennium Diamond heist. A writer from Holy Soap said "this tough cookie has had an eventful life, despite her tender years" and named Debbie's most "memorable moment" as being imprisoned for Shane's murder. In 2011, Gemma Graham of TV Buzz said that Webb had spent ten years in British living rooms playing Debbie. They said she is a character that has received numerous blows because she is a Dingle – but always came back fighting. If anyone needed a character from Emmerdale to fight their battles, Graham said that Debbie would be their choice. Of her attitude Graham added, "There's barely a soul in the soap's village who hasn't received a tongue-lashing from our Debs at one time or other. Quite honestly, she even puts the fear of God into us." Sarah Ellis of Inside Soap said that Debbie was not happy with Cameron nor Andy, "judging by the amount of time she spends looking miserable." Roz Laws of the Sunday Mercury branded Debbie as an "ice queen". In 2017, a writer from Inside Soap commented on how Debbie had become a long-running character despite being introduced as Emily and Paddy's "surly foster-daughter" in what "seemed like a dull plot we could live without"; they also attributed Debbie and Chas as being examples of "new soap characters" who rose to "soap greatness". In 2024, Roxanne Hughes from OK! called Debbie an "iconic Dingle favourite" and reported on how fans were speculating that Debbie would return for Zak's funeral, which didn’t happen.

== See also ==
- List of Emmerdale characters (2002)
- List of LGBT characters in soap operas
- List of soap opera villains
