= Lexi King =

Fictional character from Emmerdale

- Emmerdale character
- Portrayed by: Sally Oliver
- Duration: 2007–2009
- First appearance: 20 July 2007
- Last appearance: 13 August 2009
- Introduced by: Kathleen Beedles
In-universe information
- Other names: Lexi King
- Occupation: Barmaid (until 2009)
- Family: King
- Father: Barry
- Mother: Carrie Nicholls
- Stepfather: Nick Baine (2008–present)
- Half-sisters: Scarlett Nicholls
- Husband: Carl King (2009)
- Stepsons: Thomas King (2009)
- Stepdaughters: Anya King (2009)

Lexi Nicholls (also King) is a fictional character from the British ITV soap opera Emmerdale played by Sally Oliver. She appeared from 2007 to 2009.

== Casting ==
Oliver's casting was announced in June 2007. Lexi was initially introduced as the younger sister of the established Carrie Nicholls (Linda Lusardi). Oliver said "I’m thrilled to have been offered this fantastic opportunity, I’m so excited to be joining such an established show and I can’t wait for Lexi to make her mark on the village". Emmerdale series producer Kathleen Beedles says: "We’re delighted to welcome Sally to the cast and viewers can look forward to some explosive storylines after Lexi’s arrival. Oliver described Lexi as "a loose cannon"

In August 2009, after two years on the serial Oliver made an unannounced exit.: "I have loved every minute of playing Lexi but felt the time was right to move on. Oliver told the Daily Mirror "It was very emotional filming my last scenes due to the nature of the storyline, but also because I knew that I was leaving. She added: "I am going to miss everyone loads, particularly my on-screen family."

== Storylines ==
Lexi first appears in July 2007 hanging around Home Farm. Rodney Blackstock (Patrick Mower) asks her to leave but she tells him she is related to the family. While he goes to check, she climbs into the house via the kitchen window, and when she is found, Carrie Nicholls says Lexi is her younger sister. Lexi stays in Emmerdale, and Carrie insists she get a job.

Lexi soon starts at The Woolpack as a barmaid. While Carrie and Lexi's relationship is difficult, Lexi is close to Carrie's daughter, Scarlett (Kelsey-Beth Crossley), and makes friends with Chas Dingle (Lucy Pargeter). Eli Dingle (Joseph Gilgun) discovers that Lexi was previously in prison in Mexico. After leaving "The Woolpack", she gets a job at Eric's factory, and in late 2008, is appointed supervisor, over many more experienced and long-serving employees, causing resentment from other workers but they come round eventually.

In September 2007, Lexi, Chas and Debbie Dingle (Charley Webb) steal a necklace worth £50,000 from a jewellery auction at Home Farm. Lexi cuts the power and, in the dark, Debbie snatches the necklace and hides it in her jacket. They plan to get Eric Pollard (Chris Chittell) to sell it and split the money four ways. However, Debbie is unhappy with this, so she and Eric plan to tell Chas and Lexi that the necklace was a fake and quietly sell it later, splitting the money between themselves. However, Lexi hears Debbie and Eric discussing this and they fight but the necklace is lost down a drain. Horrified, Carrie asks Lexi what has happened to her since their mother died and Lexi tells her that she knows Carrie is her real mother. Carrie gave birth to her when she was 14 and her parents adopted baby Lexi. Lexi wanted Carrie to acknowledge that they were mother and daughter but Carrie refused. She did, however, tell Lexi that her father's name was Barry and was three years older than her. Carrie had been impressed with him because he had a car but wasn't in love with him. Disappointed, Lexi leaves the village for a while.

On her return, Lexi starts sleeping with Ross Kirk (Samuel Anderson), unaware that he is also sleeping with Chas. Carl realises and tells Lexi who, furious, tells Chas. Chas sees that Lexi is interested in Carl King (Tom Lister) and warns her to stay away from him but Lexi ignores her and sleeps with Carl, in the hope he would make her Scarlett's trustee at King & Sons. Matthew becomes trustee and when Chas finds out about Lexi and Carl, she wants nothing more to do with them.

When Carl goes to work with Donald De Souza (Michael Jayston), Matthew King (Matt Healy) blackmails Lexi to spy on Carl; threatening to tell Scarlett that she had worked as a lap dancer if she refused. Chas realises what Lexi is planning and warns Carl but he hires her anyway. They soon get back together and as she falls in love with Carl, Lexi is increasingly reluctant to work for Matthew. Carl discovers Matthew using the proposals he was working on and blames Jimmy King (Nick Miles). After punching Jimmy, he and Donald tell Carl the truth. Carl makes up with his brothers and Lexi loses her job. Although Carl is angry, they soon made up.

When Lexi returns from Carrie's wedding in Thailand, she tells Carl that Carrie told her that he murdered his father Tom King (Ken Farrington). The revelation makes Carl feel he has to stay with Lexi, instead of ending things with her for Anna De Souza (Emma Davies). By December 2008, Lexi is involved with many King family activities and is living with them. After Matthew's death and the company going bust, they move into Mill Cottage. These changes make the family want to make a new start, and Scarlett wants to join her mother in Canada but Lexi persuades them to stay until the New Year, and later decide not to leave the area.

After a brief engagement, Lexi and Carl marry on 31 March 2009. The wedding almost does not happen, when Carl does not appear. Unknown to Lexi, he had been trying to persuade his former love, Chas, to be with him again but she refuses, so he goes ahead with the wedding. In April, Lexi tells Carl that she wants a baby and he unwillingly agrees. In June, Lexi discovers that she is pregnant but only days later, discovers her pregnancy is ectopic. A few days later, she learns that her remaining fallopian tube is badly damaged and is unlikely to conceive naturally. He recommended she and Carl try IVF treatment. Around the same time, Lexi lost her job when the factory closed. Carl refuses to go ahead with the IVF, finally admitting that he does not want more children. He suggests they separate if she wants children that badly but she decides Carl means more to her than a family of her own. However, on 13 August, Lexi and Carl finally confront each other on the hospital roof days after Nicola King (Nicola Wheeler) gave birth to her and Jimmy's daughter, Angelica. Carl admits he never loved her and only married her because she knew he killed his father. She then decides to leave the village for Canada, and her divorce from Carl is finalized off-screen.

== Reception ==
In 2009 Ruth Deller of entertainment website Lowculture praised Lexi's exit storyline branding it as heartbreaking, being her favourite storyline of the time, also stating: "Another character bowing out this month, but this time doing so in heartbreaking style. Sally Oliver’s portrayal of Lexi going through an ectopic pregnancy was fantastic, and the explosion of Lexi and Carl’s relationship provided a very emotional and well-written departure. Applause all round."

Lexi's exit episode drew 6.8 million viewers and the preceding episode drew 5.5 million.
