= Stella Madden =

English actress

Stella Madden is an English actress who played Sue Brannigan in ITV soap opera Emmerdale. She has had several other one-off appearances in other British shows, such as Casualty and Holby City.
