= Victoria Hawkins =

English actress (born 1983)

- Born: 24 September 1983 (age 42); Gateshead, England
- Occupation: Actress

Victoria Temperley (née Hawkins), also known as Vicky Hawkins, (born 24 September 1983) is an English actress known for her Geordie roles. She played the role of Sharon Lambert in the ITV soap opera Emmerdale.

Victoria Hawkins was born in Gateshead, in the northeastern part of England whose residents are often called "Geordies." Her father is a plumber; her mother is a hairdresser.

Her first acting job was in BBC's Byker Grove, a teen drama set in a Geordie youth club. Hawkins auditioned for a part as an extra, to earn pocket money. She joined the show at the age of fifteen, playing a tomboy and disc jockey named Claire. After playing the role for four years, she left the show in 2002.

From 2002 until 2004, Hawkins worked at her local radio station, Century Radio in Newcastle/Gateshead, as Husky Hawkins reading the travel.

She also appeared in ITV's Steel River Blues, a fire-fighting drama set in North Yorkshire, which played for a single season, in 2004. Her role as control room officer Sandra Harris was described by the Yorkshire Chronicle as "a starring role ... playing a tart with a heart."

When not performing, Hawkins has worked for the Newcastle-based bank Northern Rock and Newcastle Nightclub 'Blu-Bambu'.

In 2019, under the name Victoria Temperley, she was cast in a leading role for gangster drama Moreland's Firm.
