= Ross Kirk =

Fictional character from Emmerdale

- Emmerdale character
- Portrayed by: Samuel Anderson
- Duration: 2007–2009
- First appearance: 10 October 2007
- Last appearance: 29 January 2009
- Introduced by: Kathleen Beedles
In-universe information
- Occupation: Police officer
- Father: Bill Kirk
- Half-brothers: Jason Kirk
- Uncles: Kenneth Kirk
- First cousins: Paddy Kirk (adoptive); Colin Kirk

Ross Kirk is a fictional character from the British ITV soap opera Emmerdale, played by Samuel Anderson. He appeared from 2007 to 2009. A cousin of Paddy Kirk (Dominic Brunt), Ross is a police officer and during his 15 months in the village he has an affair with Donna Windsor-Dingle (Verity Rushworth), and after being convicted of murder is imprisoned. After his release, he leaves the village.

== Character creation and development ==
Ross's arrival in the village was announced in September 2007 and Samuel Anderson said it was "great" to be joining "such a successful show". The series producer Kathleen Beedles said that Anderson was "a fantastic addition to the cast", and commented on the instant chemistry between Ross and Donna.

== Storylines ==
Ross arrives in the village in 2007 after being transferred to Hotten Police Station. He is the cousin of Paddy Kirk, the village vet, who he soon moves in with.

From the start he gets on well with his colleague Donna Windsor, which makes husband, Marlon Dingle, suspicious. In November 2007, Ross dumps his girlfriend Kirsty Rayfield – who left her husband for him. In January 2008, he begins dating Lexi Nicholls and Chas Dingle until they learn that he has been seeing both of them and get revenge for his lies by taking photographs of him handcuffed to a bed.

On 1 April 2008, a hung-over Ross accidentally brushes against a motorcyclist – Gennie Walker – whilst driving with Paddy. Worried about losing his job if he fails a breathalyzer test, Ross convinces Paddy to say he was driving. When Gennie is moved to intensive care, Paddy insists that Ross tells the truth. However, PC Shane Doyle tells Paddy that he should keep quiet in return for a light sentence. In return, Shane asks Ross to persuade Donna not to file a complaint against him for sexual harassment. Donna ignores Ross and files the complaint but Ross is deliberately vague about what he saw. This makes Paddy and Donna shun him, and feeling guilty, Ross agrees to help the Dingles punish Shane, although Donna stops this. Ross and Donna continue as partners at work, and on a stakeout, Ross tells Donna he loves her. She rebuffs him but seems to doubt her feelings. At a police comedy night, Marlon is asked to leave after a fight with a comedian and Ross and Donna spend the night together. However, Marlon and Donna soon go on holiday and return, announcing they want to have children. However, Ross tries to convince Donna that this is not a good idea and while they are both on a training course in London, they start having an affair. On their return to the village, she says she will leave Marlon so she and Ross can be together. Paddy later catches them kissing. He punches Ross and tells Donna not to ruin her marriage. Despite his love for her, he tells Donna it is probably best that Marlon never found out and they end their affair.

Shane is also blackmailing them after learning about their affair. Paddy tells Ross that he wants him to leave, and Ross agrees, and transfers to Newcastle. Donna spots him leaving and they have a heart-to-heart before he leaves. A while after Ross leaves Emmerdale, Shane's body is found in a nearby lake and Ross has to return. Marlon – now knowing about their affair – tells the police that he believes Ross killed Shane, as they were seen arguing. The police suspect Ross and he is arrested and charged with Shane's murder and remanded in custody. Donna – although reconciled with Marlon – insists he is innocent and visits him in prison. When Marlon finds out about this, he ends his relationship with Donna, saying he wants a divorce. Donna suspects that Eli Dingle murdered Shane and reports her suspicions to DS Williams and DC Henshall, Eli is arrested and later charged with murder when DNA evidence links him to the murder. Days later, Ross is released and tries to reconcile with Donna. However, she says still loves Marlon and that their relationship would never work. That night he returns to Newcastle.
