= Shaun Prendergast =

British actor

- Born: 1958 (age 67–68); North Shields, Northumberland, England
- Occupations: Actor; writer
- Years active: 1987–present

Shaun Prendergast (born 1958) is an English actor and writer.

== Career ==
Prendergast was born in North Shields and holds a BA (Hons) degree from Bretton Hall College. He was an actor and playwright in residence for Northumberland Theatre Company before joining the BBC Radio Drama Company, and subsequently became a founder member of Kenneth Branagh's newly formed Renaissance Theatre Company. Recognition for his work includes a Sony Award, a Writers' Guild Award and a Time Out Award. In 2020 he published his first novel, Benny Blue Eyes.

=== Selected TV credits ===
Prendergast has appeared in The Bill, EastEnders, Holby City, Hotel Babylon, The Lightning Kid, Heartbeat, New Tricks, Emmerdale and Collision by Anthony Horowitz. From 1988 to 1989, he voiced Sunshine, Zak and a buoy in TUGS. In summer 2010, he filmed an episode of Tracy Beaker Returns, which aired on CBBC Channel. As well as appearances in Casualty, Doctors, WPC 56, and Father Brown he plays the role of Robert Bain, the Head of Education for East Kilbride, in the drama series Waterloo Road. In 2020, he appeared in an episode of the BBC soap opera Doctors as Archie Matthews. He appeared again in 2021 as Doug Abbott. Finally, he appeared in the final episode of Doctors as Carson Black.

=== Selected film credits ===
- The Stepdad
- Henry V
- Mary Shelley's Frankenstein
- In the Bleak Midwinter
- Frozen
- Wicked Part One as Shiz President

=== Stage credits ===
At Christmas in 2010 Prendergast played the role of Sarah the Cook in the pantomime Dick Whittington at the Lyric Theatre, Hammersmith, directed by Steve Marmion. The production was given excellent reviews, with the Daily Telegraph declaring that Prendergast, in his pantomime debut, had created the "finest, funniest pantomime Dame in London". In early 2010 he played Mr Boo in The Rise and Fall of Little Voice by Jim Cartwright at the Vaudeville Theatre, London. The play was directed by Terry Johnson. Shaun was also involved in Glamour by Stephen Lowe, and directed by Bill Alexander at Nottingham Playhouse; and in Searching for Tom Hadaway for Live Theatre, which he also wrote and directed. Other appearances include:

- Hamlet
- Much Ado about Nothing
- Twelfth Night
- As You Like It (for Kenneth Branagh's Renaissance Company national tour and Phoenix Theatre, West End)
- The Glee Club (Bush and the Duchess Theatre, West End)
- Macbeth and the Sam Shephard season at the BAC
- A Going Concern at Hampstead Theatre Club
- Waitress at the Adelphi Theatre London

Other theatre credits include Grace, Twelfth Night, Candida, (NTC), Dracula, Spot the Lady, A View from the Bridge, Strippers, (Newcastle Playhouse), Twelve Tales of Tyneside (Live Theatre), Sisterly Feelings (Manchester Library Theatre), As You Like it (Nottingham Playhouse), and The Miser (Salisbury).

=== Radio credits ===
- Westway
- The Goldfish Bowl
- Phoenix England
- The Bee-keeper's Apprentice
- The Little World of Don Camillo
- My Uncle Freddie

plus more than two hundred individual plays

== Writing credits ==
=== Television and radio ===
Multiple episodes of:

- The Roman Mysteries
- Rocket Man (BBC)
- The Lightning Kid (BBC)
- My Parents Are Aliens (ITV)
- EastEnders (BBC)
- Grafters (ITV)
- Equinox (BBC)
- Microsoap (BBC)
- Soldier Soldier (ITV)

=== Film ===
- Rebel Zone (BBC Films)
- The Stepdad
- Henry V
- Mary Shelley's Frankenstein
- In the Bleak Midwinter
- Frozen
- Bye Bye Columbus
- Harrigan
- Stupid Cults
- Rudolph & His New Friend Frosty
- Mikey The Canary

=== Theatre writing ===
- Potter's Wheel
- The Firefawn Trilogy
- A Fine and Private Place
- Distinguished Service
- Little Victories
- The Green Eyed Monster of Ecrovid
- The Witches' Kitchen
- Twelve Tales of Tyneside
- Poles Apart
- Come and Make Eyes at Me
- Karl Marx Live in Concert
- The True History of the Tragic Life and Triumphant Death of Julia Pastrana, the Ugliest Woman in the World
- The False Corpse
- The Biggest Adventure in the World

In 2013 The True History of the Tragic Life and Triumphant Death of Julia Pastrana, the Ugliest Woman in the World was presented at the Brick Theatre in Brooklyn and the Tympanic Theatre in Chicago. Earlier that year, Julia Pastrana's body had been returned from Oslo to her birthplace in Mexico. An article in The New York Times credited Prendergast's play as being the inspiration for the campaign to have Julia Pastrana repatriated to her birthplace.

=== Adaptations ===
- Cinderella
- Beauty and the Beast
- The Giant Prince
- The Three Musketeers
- The Canterville Ghost
- The Day of the Triffids

=== Television ===
- The Lightning Kid
- Rocket Man
- Soldier Soldier
- EastEnders
- Grafters
- Equinox
- My Parents are Aliens
- Microsoap.

=== Radio ===
- Open Mike
- Kiss Me Quick
- Only the Good Die Young
- Phoenix England
- A Fake's Progress
- Travellin' Light
- The Bee-Keeper's Apprentice
- Spread a Little Happiness
- The Goldfish Bowl
