= Chas Dingle =

Fictional character from Emmerdale

- Emmerdale character
- Lucy Pargeter as Chas Dingle
- Portrayed by: Lucy Pargeter; Lynette Creane (2016, Ashley's perspective); Charleigh Brierley (2017 flashback); Maddy Barker (2022 flashback)
- Duration: 2002–present
- First appearance: Episode 3287; 16 October 2002
- Introduced by: Keith Richardson
- Spin-off appearances: Emmerdale: The Dingles, For Richer For Poorer (2010)
- Crossover appearances: Corriedale (2026)
In-universe information
- Other names: Chas Livesy; Chas Spencer; Chastity Dingle
- Occupation: Stripper; Barmaid; Pub landlady; Armed forces
- Father: Shadrach Dingle
- Mother: Faith Dingle
- Half-brothers: Cain Dingle; Caleb Miligan
- Half-sisters: Gennie Walker
- Husband: Gordon Livesy (backstory); Dan Spencer (2012–2013); Paddy Kirk (2020–2024)
- Sons: Aaron Dingle
- Daughters: Grace Dingle; Eve Dingle
- Stepsons: Sean Spencer
- Stepdaughters: Amelia Spencer
- Grandfathers: Jedediah Dingle
- Grandmothers: Peg Dingle
- Uncles: Zak Dingle; Albert Dingle; Ezra Dingle; Caleb Dingle
- Nephews: Nate Robinson; Kyle Dingle; Isaac Dingle; Nicky Miligan
- Nieces: Debbie Dingle; Molly Sharma; Steph Miligan (adoptive)
- First cousins: Sam Dingle; Lilith Dingle; Del Dingle; Marlon Dingle; Mandy Dingle; Tina Dingle; Butch Dingle; Eli Dingle; Belle Dingle
- Other relatives: Charity Dingle; Ryan Stocks; Noah Dingle; April Windsor; Leo Goskirk; Moses Dingle; Obadiah Dingle; Sarah Sugden; Jack Sugden; Frankie Robinson; Leyla Sugden

Chastity "Chas" Dingle (also Spencer) is a fictional character from the British ITV soap opera Emmerdale, played by Lucy Pargeter. She made her first appearance during the episode broadcast on 16 October 2002. Chas returned on 21 September 2003. Chas was absent for six months in 2005 when Pargeter took maternity leave. She left temporarily on 5 June 2005, and returned full-time from 13 December 2005. In 2013, Pargeter announced that she would be taking a short break from the show in order to appear in I'm A Celebrity... Get Me Out of Here!. Pargeter was briefly recast for one episode on 20 December 2016 to provide an alternative physical appearance to the character through the eyes of Ashley Thomas (John Middleton). Chas departed temporarily once again on 31 March 2017 when Pargeter took a second maternity leave. Pargeter confirmed her return to filming on 31 August 2017. Chas returned on 25 October 2017. In January 2024, it was announced that Chas would be diagnosed with triple-negative breast cancer in an upcoming storyline.

Chas's main storylines have focused on her turbulent relationship with Carl King (Tom Lister), becoming a prime suspect in the murder of Tom King (Ken Farrington), discovering she has a half-sister Gennie Walker (Sian Reese-Williams), rebuilding a relationship with her son Aaron Dingle (Danny Miller) who she abandoned as a child, her relationship with Paddy Kirk (Dominic Brunt), disputing with her niece Debbie Dingle (Charley Webb) after having an affair with Debbie's fiancé Cameron Murray (Dominic Power), her grief over the loss of her father Shadrach Dingle (Andy Devine), sister Gennie and best friend Katie Sugden (Sammy Winward), developing post-traumatic stress disorder after witnessing Robert Sugden (Ryan Hawley) being shot, discovering Aaron's sexual abuse at the hands of his father Gordon Livesy (Gary Mavers), discovering that she is pregnant with Paddy's child but that the baby Grace will not survive long after birth due to bilateral renal agenesis, and falling pregnant again with their second daughter, Eve.

== Development ==
=== Casting ===
Charleigh Brierley briefly portrayed Chas in a special flashback episode that showed the childhood of Chas and her brother Cain Dingle (Jeff Hordley), which was originally broadcast on 17 November 2017.

=== Prison life and affair ===
Daniel Kilkelly of Digital Spy confirmed that Chas Dingle would begin a steamy affair with Cameron Murray (Dominic Power), the boyfriend of her niece Debbie Dingle (Charley Webb). The pair's attraction ignites after Cameron is employed at the Woolpack and later succumb as their love strengthens. However, back in the summer, Chas's half sister Gennie Walker (Sian Reese-Williams) discovered that half-sister Chas was having an affair with Cameron, but she ultimately decided to conceal her discovery upon the illicit couple agreeing to end the fling. The latest twist begins as Chas plays with fire by suggesting that Cameron should meet her at Gennie's place as nobody will be in. However, as the pair passionately kiss in the house, the front door suddenly opens and Gennie catches them red-handed! Sian Reese-Williams hinted that Gennie may be later involved with protecting her secret, commenting: "Nothing ever goes unpunished in soapland, does it? I'm sure that this won't, either. Gennie's role in keeping the secret will be brought up again, I'm sure. It's lurking in the background!" As Emmerdale's 40th anniversary episodes aired, Debbie, along with parents Cain Dingle and Charity Sharma, finally uncovered Chas's affair with Cameron, marking the climax of one of the biggest stories in Emmerdale's history.

=== Temporary departure (2017) ===
On 31 October 2016, Pargeter announced she was pregnant, and as such the character of Chas would be temporarily written out in 2017. Chas made her final appearance in the episode broadcast 31 March 2017, alongside actress Isobel Steele, who played Olivia Flaherty, as Steele was also leaving temporarily to take her GCSEs. Pargeter gave birth to twin daughters in April 2017, and she returned to filming in August 2017. Chas made her on-screen return to the programme on 25 October 2017.

=== Pregnancy and daughter's death ===
In late 2017, producers reunited Chas and Paddy Kirk (Dominic Brunt). A few months later, Chas discovers she is pregnant. Laura Morgan of Digital Spy observed, "It's obvious why the Emmerdale writers love these two together – they have a strong bond, a shared history, and are first and foremost best mates who are not afraid to take the mickey out of each other. We've watched them co-parent Aaron over the years, but to see them have a biological child would be a whole new world." Chas initially decides to have an abortion, but she changes her mind while she is at the clinic and tells Paddy that she wants to be a mother again.

In May 2018, Chas attends a scan alone, as she has mixed up the dates, and the sonographer notices something wrong with the baby. Chas is then informed that her baby has bilateral renal agenesis, a fatal condition in which the kidneys do not develop properly.

Grace's birth takes place during an "experimental episode", in which Paddy imagines he and Chas have taken their daughter on a trip. Scenes show Grace when she is one, four, and 12 years old. Pargeter explained, "It's the kind of things they would have done with her if she'd have still been around – it's in their heads in the delivery room after she's just been born. They're thinking about all of the things that they won't get to do with her. They kind of go there with her in their minds." Pargeter believed the episode needed some "lightness" because of how sad the rest of the storyline is. Grace dies in Chas's arms at the end of the episode.

== Storylines ==
Chas first appeared when she arrives in Emmerdale dressed as a nun for the stag night of her cousin Marlon (Mark Charnock). She is hired by her father, Shadrach Dingle (Andy Devine), and ends the evening locked in the back of a van with Ashley Thomas (John Middleton). Several months later, she becomes homeless and moves in with the Dingles and gets a job as barmaid at The Woolpack. Chas has a son, Aaron Dingle (Danny Miller), with her ex-husband Gordon (Gerard Fletcher), whom she allowed custody. Aaron hates his mother, feeling that she had abandoned him. Aaron rejects Chas's attempts to make amends for this and after he deliberately tells her about Carl and Delilah's fling, she ceases contact in order for Gordon, Aaron and his new wife, Sandra, to become a proper family.

Soon enough, Chas makes friends with Carl King (Tom Lister) shortly after he and his family move into Holdgate Farm. They share a bond due to the fact that they are both parental failures and begin dating. The attraction strengthens into love but Carl's family disapprove and send him away after Paul Marsden (Matthew Booth) dies but he later returns and they get together. Chas's relationship with Carl was never stable, and the couple go through numerous break-ups and reconciliations. Despite Chloe Atkinson's (Amy Nuttall) poison pen letter scheme, Tom and Rosemary's blackmail, Carl's guilt over murdering his father and marriage to Chas's former friend, Lexi Nicholls (Sally Oliver), the relationship survives but finally deteriorates upon Chas discovering Carl was sleeping with Eve Jenson (Suzanne Shaw). Heartbroken, she follows her second cousin Charity's (Emma Atkins) advice to persuade him to marry her and falsely claims to be pregnant. However, she steals the money meant for the wedding and jilts him at the altar, telling him that he should be grateful that she lied about expecting his child.

Chas also develops a relationship with her half-sister, Gennie Walker (Sian Reese-Williams). Laurel Thomas (Charlotte Bellamy) tells her that Shadrach put Gennie up for adoption after her mother died in childbirth, believing he couldn't bring her home to his wife, Faith. After coming to terms with this, she helps her father write to Gennie and feels neglected when Shadrach seems obsessed with his new daughter. Chas and Gennie become friends and Chas advises Gennie on how to care for her mother. Chas also manages to rebuild her relationship with her son, Aaron (now Danny Miller). She discovers his whereabouts, with help from her cousin Marlon's wife, Donna (Verity Rushworth), who has arrested Aaron for drug offences. Initially he is not pleased to see her but after the Dingles rescue him from the McFarlanes, he moves in with them. Aaron is pleased when Chas stands up for him when Lisa (Jane Cox) throws him out for encouraging Belle Dingle (Eden Taylor-Draper) to steal, so they move in with Paddy Kirk (Dominic Brunt). Initially, Chas enrolls him at the local school but he refuses to go and starts work at the garage with Cain Dingle (Jeff Hordley) and Debbie Dingle (Charley Webb).

Eventually, Chas's friendship with Paddy develops into a serious relationship. Chas is unsure of the relationship's future but Katie Sugden (Sammy Winward) encourages her. Unfortunately Carl, newly separated from Lexi, decides he still loves Chas. Chas later succumbs to Carl's advances, but Chas decides that she wants to improve her relationship with Paddy and keeps her night with Carl a secret. Infuriated with this, Carl tells Paddy of their one-night stand, leading Paddy to kick her and Aaron out. No one is pleased with Chas but only Katie and Debbie support her. Aaron insists she choose between him or Carl. Chas chooses Carl, moves back in with the Dingles but then soon moves back in with Paddy. Angry with Carl, Aaron disconnects the brakes on Carl's car, nearly killing Jimmy King (Nick Miles), his wife Nicola (Nicola Wheeler) and their newborn daughter, Angelica King, when they borrow the car. Horrified, Aaron runs Jimmy off the road to warn him and Chas loses her temper with Aaron, telling him that she wants nothing more to do with him. This incident has more of an effect on Aaron than Chas realises and makes him seriously rethink his behaviour. Though she continues to show concern for him, he resists allowing her back into his life. Paddy tells Chas that Aaron is gay, surprising her. She is devastated when Aaron attempts suicide but immediately supports him. After this, they slowly begin to reconcile. She is thrilled for him when he meets Jackson Walsh (Marc Silcock) and they build a relationship, albeit a bit rocky.

Chas convinces Diane Sugden (Elizabeth Estensen), landlady of The Woolpack, that they would benefit if Chas bought into The Woolpack. After weeks of pestering, which include Chas helping out behind bar for free, Diane relents and in desperate need of the money, sells half The Woolpack to Chas. Chas becomes colleagues with Debbie's boyfriend Cameron Murray (Dominic Power), needing the money, and an attraction grows. They finally give in to temptation and have a steamy sex session in the cellar. Chas tells Cameron that it was a mistake but they later begin an affair. After a fight between Cain and Cameron led to an impregnated Debbie being accidentally injured, endangering her and the baby she's expecting, they realise they cannot be together and part ways. Chas is told by Bob in the cafe that Dan Spencer (Liam Fox) fancies her. She invites him to dinner and they become a couple. Chas proposes to Dan after several dates, but he declines. However, he changes his mind and as he proposes to her, Chas accepts. Carl takes Chas's phone and finds photos of her with Cameron, discovering her relationship with Cameron. He threatens to tell Debbie about the affair, unless he is given his money back.

However, when Chas and Cameron refund the money, Carl reveals he still loves her and thinks she shouldn't marry Dan and Chas almost misses her hen night, arguing with him. Not long after marrying Dan, Chas tries to leave the village. Carl finds her and he tries to rape her but Chas picks up a brick and hits him over the head with it, before running back to the pub. Carl is later found dead and Chas believes she killed him. However, Cameron visited Carl soon after and as the pair had a heated confrontation, Cameron delivered the final attack, murdering him. Chas is then arrested for Carl's murder, facing trial. Debbie, wanting revenge for her affair with Cameron, takes to the stand against Chas, wanting her sent down in a bid to split up Chas and Cameron. Chas is found not guilty and returns to the village, much to the dislike of Debbie and Charity, with Debbie swearing to make Chas and Cameron's life a living hell.

While on her way to a party, Chas takes a lift from Debbie, but she takes Chas to an abandoned barn and pulls a gun on her. She ties Chas to a wooden pillar and blindfolds her, she intimidates her so she can understand how angry she is for what Chas has done with Cameron. Cain and Charity then arrive, and at first it seems as though Cain is willing to let Debbie execute Chas, but he and Charity eventually talk Debbie into letting Chas go. After this incident, Chas returns to running The Woolpack, however customers avoid the pub, due to the atmosphere. Chas tries her best to regain the regulars, but she is unsuccessful. She takes out a loan against the pub to try to keep the business afloat, stating she is very close to bankruptcy, with mounting legal fees to pay also. Chas and Cameron continue their relationship and remain in the village. In July, Gennie suspects that Cameron and Debbie are having an affair, and warns Chas about it. However, Chas thinks Gennie is trying to tear them apart and dismisses her claims. Soon, Gennie's suspicions are confirmed when she records a conversation in which Cameron confesses to killing Carl to Debbie, and the pair rekindling their romance. Gennie intends to tell Chas, but later dies after being suffocated by Cameron in order to keep his secret following a car chase between her, Cameron and Debbie. At Gennie's funeral, Chas learns that Cameron has been having an affair with Debbie. Chas delivers an emotional eulogy and then marches out of the church. Later, Chas packs Cameron's bags and brings them to Debbie's home, where she tells them they are selfish and deserve each other. Debbie and Charity both soften towards Chas and Charity apologises to her for treating her coldly for her affair with Cameron.

In September 2013, when Cameron's murderous crimes are exposed by Debbie and Chas, after gaining evidence from Gennie's phone, he is arrested and charged with the murders of Carl, Alex, and Gennie. In October 2013, he manages to escape jail, gaining his passport and clothes. He then buys a ticket for a ferry, so people would assume he's left Yorkshire for good. However, he doesn't attend the ferry. When Debbie, Chas and the other villagers are aware of his escape, they panic, with Debbie fearing the worst. Later on, Sarah is taken by Cameron, and is locked in a barn, assuring her that he will get Debbie and Jack, and go away as a family somewhere. She believes him, but when Zak and Moira are alerted of her disappearance, they look for her. Debbie and other villagers, including Chas, Diane and Zak, are in The Woolpack, panicking. They learn that Sarah has been found by Andy and Moira, but also know that Cameron is back and he breaks into The Woolpack, taking everyone hostage, knocking Marlon unconscious and leaving him in the cellar, where the flood water rises. Cameron accidentally shoots Alicia Harding (Natalie Anderson) in the stomach, and David Metcalfe (Matthew Wolfenden) begs Cameron to let her out, in need of medical assistance, as she is dying. He lets David and Alicia out, along with the rest of the villagers, except for Debbie and Chas. After Marlon gains consciousness, Debbie and Chas rush to the cellar, as they are engulfed by the water rising to the top. Cameron manages to get to the cellar and insists on him and Debbie drowning together. They float to below the water. As Debbie struggles, she manages to get out of Cameron's reach with Chas intact. As Cameron gasps for breath, trying to pull Debbie back in, he fails, as she is outside, safe. He grabs a bulb and because of the encounter with the water, he is electrocuted, and is finally killed, ending his wrath and getting his comeuppance. Debbie rushes to Zak, soaking wet and crying as he reassures her Cameron is where he belongs – in hell, ending The Woolpack siege and Cameron's life. Chas then decides to go and stay in Southern France with Aaron for a few months.

In February 2014, Chas returns and quickly becomes romantically involved with James Barton (Bill Ward), who turns out to be Adam Barton's (Adam Thomas) biological father. When Chas discovers this, Adam's mother Moira Barton (Natalie J. Robb) goes to great lengths to make sure Chas does not tell her brother, Cain, who is married to Moira. She even locks her in The Woolpack cellar to make sure she does not tell anyone. The truth is revealed in April, however, when at Finn Barton's (Joe Gill) birthday party, an old tape recorder of the younger Bartons is played. In August 2014, Aaron returns to help his best friend Adam, who is involved in illegal dealings with Ross Barton (Michael Parr). Chas realises she misses Aaron so decides to hand him and Adam in to the police, but Aaron stops her. Instead, Adam and Aaron both hand themselves in. Adam is granted bail but Aaron is not because he has already missed his court case. Eventually, he gets a suspended sentence and Aaron moves in with Chas in The Woolpack.

In February 2015, Chas loses her best friend, Katie, in an accident at Wylie's Farm when Robert Sugden (Ryan Hawley) pushed her during an argument and she fell through rotting floor. In his grief, Aaron bursts into tears and Chas comforts him and tells him that she needs him strong for her. The next day, she finds out that Robert and Aaron are having an affair so she slaps Aaron, which leads to Aaron ending the affair. She is furious when Tracy Shankley (Amy Walsh) disrespects Katie's memory, so she throws a drink over her and orders her to leave. Chas later accompanies Aaron on his running sessions, unaware that he is actually self-harming. When he goes missing after suffering a fall, Robert helps Chas find him; however, she threatens to tell his wife Chrissie White (Louise Marwood) about his affair with Aaron. In order to keep her silence, Robert contemplates killing Chas with a rock, but when they find Aaron, he throws the rock away. When they return to the village, Robert hires a hitman to make Chas disappear once and for all. However, when Chas later tells Robert that she is not going to tell Chrissie, and Aaron tells Robert that he is not always the best at dealing with things on his own and needs Chas and Paddy, Robert realises that he has made a big mistake. When he spots the hitman about to abduct Chas outside The Woolpack, Robert quickly stops him and pays him a large amount of money not to hurt Chas. Later, Chas is livid when she discovers that James has slept with his scheming ex-wife, Emma Barton (Gillian Kearney), leading to Chas throwing a drink over Emma and Aaron hitting James over the head with a glass bottle.

In August 2015, while attending Debbie's wedding to Pete Barton (Anthony Quinlan), Chas and the rest of her family are involved in a helicopter crash when a helicopter which Pete had hired as a surprise for Debbie is hit by a gas canister from an explosion caused by Chrissie, and the helicopter careers into the village hall. Chas is not seriously injured, and helps other villagers out of the rubble. Chas later confronts Chrissie when she sees her with a gun vowing to kill Robert after the truth about Katie's death is revealed. After Robert is shot while arguing with Chas, she immediately accuses Chrissie, believing the shooter was Aaron. In a flashback episode, the shooter is revealed to be Ross. Diane and Chas fall out over the shooting and a series of mysterious events beginning to occur at the Woolpack. Chas becomes convinced that Emma is stalking her but it's later revealed that Chas is the real culprit as she has been sleepwalking. Late one night, Chas believes the "intruder" has returned to the pub and picks up a knife for defense, accidentally stabbing Diane. She is overwhelmed with guilt and after hearing Cameron's voice in her head, she hands herself in to the police, but is released on bail. When staying over at Cain's house, Chas has a psychotic episode where she hallucinates Robert, Carl, and Cameron. She flees into the woods but trips and hits her head on a rock, knocking her unconscious. She is found by Nicola and taken back to Aaron and Cain. By then, Emma has correctly diagnosed her with post traumatic stress disorder, resulting from years of built up stress from Cameron's reign of terror and Carl's murder, and triggered after she witnessed Robert being shot.

In December 2015, as a result of the stabbing, it is discovered that Diane's cancer has returned in her stomach. While receiving chemotherapy, Diane encounters Gordon (now played by Gary Mavers), Chas's ex-husband and Aaron's father. Although initially reluctant, Gordon decides that he wants to meet Chas and Aaron again to try to make amends. Chas and Gordon start dating again behind Aaron's back, which upsets Aaron when he catches them together, and triggers Aaron's self-harming. Later, after confronting Chas about her and Gordon, Aaron prepares to leave the village. He collapses from sepsis as a result of his self-harming and is rushed to the hospital by Robert, unknown to Chas.

Meanwhile, Diane puts her half of The Woolpack up for sale and Gordon offers to buy it, which Aaron learns about and is vehemently against, and after he confronts his father, Gordon breaks up with Chas. Chas takes out a loan so she can buy Diane out. Thinking that this is Gordon's doing, Aaron accuses Chas of getting back with Gordon, which causes Chas to tell Aaron to move out. Robert learns of this and tells Chas that Aaron is in a dark place and shouldn't be left on his own. After Cain tells Chas that he caught Aaron trying to burn himself on his birthday and that he believes Robert knows something, Chas pays Robert a visit where Robert tells Chas that Aaron is cutting himself again and that he ended up in hospital because of Gordon. Chas asks Robert what else he knows and Robert states that has to come from Aaron. The next day, after spending a day at the seaside, Aaron tells Chas his dad raped him. Chas hugs Aaron and tell him she will make everything better. The next day, Chas visits Gordon and confronts him about what he did to Aaron. Gordon lies that Aaron was actually abused by his football coach, but Chas refuses to believe him. As Chas is about to leave, Gordon blocks her way and threatens her. Gordon showed his dark side and admits to Chas to abusing Aaron. When Chas returns, Chas tells Cain about Aaron's abuse, leaving Cain horrified. Chas tells Cain to make Gordon suffer for what he did to Aaron. The next day, Moira asks Chas about Cain's whereabouts, which forces Chas to tell Aaron, that Cain had gone to see Gordon. They drive to Gordon's house where they stop Cain, from killing Gordon. In order to do so, Aaron tells Cain that he will call the police on Gordon. Aaron tells Chas to inform Paddy, Adam and the rest of the Dingles, and after Gordon threatens Aaron at the scrapyard, Chas convinces Aaron to take some time away from the village.

The case against Gordon is running too slow for Chas's liking so she decides to take matters in her own hands. She goes to Gordon's house, and sprays "Paedo" on his car before Robert turns up. Robert warns Chas that she's making life much worse for Aaron. Chas returns after being given a warning for the vandalism and comes face to face with a furious Aaron who just found out. Aaron gives Chas an ultimatum, tell everyone Gordon is innocent or he will walk away but Chas blurts out to everybody what happened to Aaron, Chas confronts Cain after he appears to be ashamed of Aaron, now that his past is revealed but Cain explains that he feels that he is failing Aaron. During this time, Robert helps Aaron track down his stepmother Sandra and his half-sister, Liv Flaherty (Isobel Steele), to see if Sandra can back-up his story. The police inform Aaron that another male victim has come forward, which leads to Gordon going to the pub and accusing Chas for paying his neighbour Ryan Harred (George Sampson) to lie to the police and say he abused him, of which Chas has no idea of this. Gordon threatens and pins Chas against a wall and orders her to call Ryan to get him to retract his statement. Marlon walks in and grabs Gordon before the police arrive and take Gordon away. Later, Robert confesses to Chas that he was the person who paid Ryan. Chas is worried that this is going to hurt Aaron's case and is contemplating telling him what Robert has done, but the police arrive and tell Aaron that because of Ryan's statement, they believe that they now have a case. Some time later, Chas confesses to Aaron that Robert paid Ryan to lie to the police. Aaron breaks down and warns Robert if the case falls apart, he will blame it on him. Aaron visits Ryan to tell him to drop his statement, and Chas gets a visit from DS Wise (Neil Roberts) who told her the second witness has dropped his statement but they will charge Gordon anyway. Chas then reveals the excellent news to Aaron.

On top of the court case, Chas also has to deal with the return of Charity. She is revealed to have bought Diane's half of the pub, and intends to give her the money in due time. However, as time itself drags on with no payment from Charity, Chas warns her not to screw Diane over. Diane's partner Doug Potts (Duncan Preston) does not trust Charity, especially as he is the one who shall be receiving Charity's payment due to Diane caring for her ill mother-in-law Annie (Sheila Mercier) in Spain.

In April 2016, Chas supported Aaron in court. Aaron takes on the stand and brings questions about his mum's past relationship. Later, Chas went to confronts Gordon who told her he blames her for the way their son has turned out. The next day, Chas take on the stand. Gordon's barrister questions Chas on why Aaron still has the same surname as his alleged attacker. He quizzes Chas on her blaming herself for Aaron being messed up, suggesting she believes Aaron to alleviate her own guilt, but Chas hits back that the abuse has made her feel even more guilty for not protecting her son. The defence brings up Chas's PTSD and Aaron leaving for Ireland when she needed him most. Later, Aaron reassures Chas she did great but Chas apologizes. Aaron admits to Chas, Gordon's barrister was right about one thing, he doesn't want Gordon's name – so he is going to change it to Dingle. 2 days later, Gordon is found guilty of rape by the jury.

In May 2016, DS Wise arrives at the village and tells Aaron, Chas and Liv that Gordon has been found dead in his prison cell the day after Gordon is sentenced to 18 years imprisonment. Chas confronts an upset Liv, who has been staying with Chas and Aaron at the pub. Later, Chas went to the garage and asks Cain if he got somebody to finished Gordon off. Cain tells her no but he had a feelings that Robert could be involved in Gordon's death. Chas and Cain went to the pub and tell Aaron that they believe Robert paid somebody to have Gordon killed. Aaron starts to believe that it could be true. They were unaware that Liv was listening upstairs. The next day, Chas and Aaron are left shocked to see DS Wise turn up after Liv texts him on Chas's phone. Liv tells DS Wise that Robert killed her dad but DS Wise tells her that Gordon took his life by hanging himself. A few weeks later, Chas, Aaron, Robert and Liv attended Gordon's funeral. Chas watched on as Aaron delivered his eulogy, telling Gordon he is going straight to hell. Shortly after, Aaron and Robert take Liv on holiday and in their absence, the stress of the last few months finally takes its toll on Chas and she starts having nightmares again. Emma convinces her that her PTSD has returned and Chas admits herself into a mental health clinic. She returns a few weeks later and is told that Aaron finally learnt the truth about Robert's shooting and informs her son that she knew the truth months ago but didn't tell him in order to protect him.

In September 2016, Chas and Diane go to Butlers farm to take Moira out only to find out the devastating news that Holly has died from an overdose. Chas tells Cain to support his estranged wife, telling him she needs him. In October 2016, Aaron is admitted to hospital after he and Robert crashed into a lake. While waiting for news of Aaron's condition, Chas offers a consoling hug to Robert and is pleasantly surprised to discover he was planning on proposing to Aaron. She jokingly tells him they'll have a "big, gay wedding". Chas, Robert and Liv keep vigil at Aaron's bedside and Chas happily watches on as her son accepts Robert's proposal. The next day, Chas learns that James died following the recent motorway collision and offers her condolences to Adam. Two weeks later, Chas gathers with the rest of the village to pay their final respects to James.

In January 2017, Chas is worried about Aaron when he is arrested for attacking Kasim Sabet (Ethan Kai). As she waits at the police station, she is reunited with DS Wise who offers to help but Paddy's interference causes him to back off and Chas is worried what will happen if her son goes to prison. Chas is shocked and angry when her estranged mother, Faith Dingle (Sally Dexter) turns up in the village and is quick to let her know what she thinks of her. She is skeptical when Faith claims to have donated £20,000 anonymously to Sarah's cancer fund and is frustrated when Cain offers to pay for her lodgings at the B&B.

After Robert tells her he wants to prove his commitment to Aaron and Liv before Aaron goes to prison, Chas, with the help of the Dingles and Sugdens, organises a surprise wedding in The Woolpack. Just as the service gets underway the police show up looking for Faith in connection with the £20,000. As chaos unfolds, Robert and Aaron sneak away on their own and exchange their vows in private before heading back to the pub to tell their guests. Chas is delighted for them but is furious with her mother for the trouble she caused and tells her to leave the village. The next day, Chas accompanies Aaron to court and returns soon after to tell Robert that he's been sentenced to 12 months in prison, leaving her new son in law devastated.

Chas returns from Prague to the shocking news that Aaron has been taking drugs in prison as well as the fact that Robert had sex with Rebecca White (Emily Head). Livid, Chas slaps him before ordering him to stay away from Aaron and Liv. Chas later slaps Rebecca for sleeping with Robert. The next day, Robert tells Chas that Aarons appeal was successful and he'll be released in a few weeks. At the prison, Chas is concerned about her son's fragile state of mind and decides to interject just as Robert is about to confess to Aaron about Rebecca. Back at the pub, she insists she only covered for him for Aaron's sake and warns him to make sure Rebecca doesn't say anything. While still awaiting Aaron's return from prison, Chas receives a phone call from Liv's aunt, who reveals that Liv's mother Sandra is in a coma after suffering an accident abroad. While reluctant, Chas opts to escort Liv to Ireland to see Sandra. Later in the year, Liv returns home while Chas remains in Ireland to look after a recovering Sandra.

Chas returns to Emmerdale in October 2017 and immediately reunites with Paddy. She also finally makes up with her mother Faith after years of being estranged and hostile. She is also furious to find out she owes money to save The Woolpack pub thanks to Charity and Debbie, after her signature was forged. Upon her return, Chas and Paddy get back together. In early 2018, she learns that she is pregnant.

== Reception ==
On Digital Spy's 2012 end of year reader poll, Chas and Cameron's affair was voted fourth in the "Best Storyline" category, receiving 8.9% of the vote. Pargeter was nominated for the "Best Actress" award at the 2013 British Soap Awards, and was also nominated for the same award in 2014. For her portrayal of Chas, Pargeter won the accolade for Best Soap Actor (Female) at the 2018 Digital Spy Reader Awards. In 2019, Pargeter received a National Television Awards nomination in the Serial Drama Performance category for her portrayal of Chas. The same year, she was the final winner of the British Soap Award for Best Actress for her work in the baby loss storyline. In 2017, a writer from Inside Soap commented on how Chas had become a long-running character despite the magazine "barely" giving her a mention when she first appeared as a stripper in her debut episode; they also attributed Debbie and Chas as being examples of "new soap characters" who rose to "soap greatness". In 2024, Gary Gillatt from Inside Soap praised Chas's Breast Cancer storyline, writing, "We wept for Faith, and now we do so again for Chas – who bravely faced a double mastectomy – thanks to top-drawer writing and a subtle, eloquent performance from Lucy Pargeter. And the story goes on. Powerful, educational, important...and full of truth". Gillatt's colleague, Laura-Jayne Tyler, later praised the follow up of the storyline, writing, "Chas steals our bullseye for the second time this year, as we applaud Emmerdale on its diligent plotting of her storyline, from the initial breast cancer diagnosis to the realities of undergoing a double mastectomy. Women navigating the same journey will certainly relate to her fears, vulnerability and – indeed – courage, while everyone else has received a very powerful education. Sobering stuff." Pargeter longlisted for "Best Actress" at the 2024 Inside Soap Awards.

Lucy Lather from Inside Soap included Chas in a feature profiling positively received storylines and branded Chas her "new soap heroine". Lather also opined that she is a "Dingle with brains and beauty - let's face it, most of them have neither!" Duncan Lindsay from Metro praised Brierley's portrayal of Chas in the 2017 flashback episode, writing that she did well at the "mammoth job" of portraying an "iconic" Emmerdale character.
