= Sally Oliver =

English actress

- Born: 26 December 1983 (age 42); Dagenham, London, England, UK
- Occupation: Actress
- Known for: Playing Lexi King in Emmerdale

Sally Oliver (born 26 December 1983) is an English actress who appeared in British soap opera Emmerdale from July 2007 to August 2009, playing the character of Lexi, the sister of Carrie Nicholls (played by Linda Lusardi) and the aunt of Scarlett Nicholls (played by Kelsey-Beth Crossley). Emmerdale was Sally's first television role.

As a theatre actress, Sally made her professional London debut playing the role of Catherine in Proof at the Arts Theatre in February/March 2007. The role was originally played in London by Gwyneth Paltrow.

Sally grew up in Dagenham, east London, and attended William Bellamy Junior and Infants Schools, St Edwards Secondary School, before later moving to Havering Sixth Form College in September 2000 to study for her A' Levels.

Sally had a cameo role as Caitlin in Holby City in August 2010.
