= Kelsey-Beth Crossley =

British actress

- Born: 8 July 1992 (age 33); Fleetwood, England, United Kingdom
- Occupation: Actress
- Years active: 2007–present;
- Television: Emmerdale (2007-2011, 2012)
- Children: 1

Kelsey-Beth Crossley (born 8 July 1992) is a British actress from Fleetwood, England, who played the part of Scarlett Nicholls, the secret teenage daughter of deceased millionaire Tom King and Carrie Nicholls on the ITV soap opera Emmerdale. She made her first appearance in March 2007, and last appearance on 20 November 2012.

== Background ==
Crossley was a pupil at Bispham High School Arts College in Blackpool, England. She was put forward for an audition in Emmerdale by Blackpool-based children's casting agency, Scream Management, and from hundreds, she made it through to the final six, who were then invited to take part in a workshop. She then made the final two, took part in screen tests and was sent back to the Fylde to await the decision.

Emmerdale is not her first television appearance. In 2006 she appeared in a support role in a one-off Docudrama, Becky's Story on BBC One, a special episode of the current affairs programme, Real Story hosted by Fiona Bruce. The episode she appeared in looked at how a vulnerable teenager was failed by a system supposed to protect her from a dangerous paedophile and prostitution. She had won two awards in the annual Scream Awards – and got her seen by TV director Fran Baker, one of the judges, who called her to audition for "Becky's Story".

When she was nine years old, she played the part of Eva Lauren in rags-to-riches musical Her Benny at Liverpool Empire Theatre. And at eleven years old, she won the national Teeny Bopper Talent Show and competed against hundreds at festival4stars where she was crowned the winner. She has studied drama at Scream Theatre School, Blackpool. Beth also trains her singing with top vocal coach Zoë Tyler and drama with Seren Mistery. She also studied piano with leading piano teacher Ruth Birchall.

She has also played the main role of Aladdin, at the Floral Pavilion's 2011 production of Aladdin.

Crossley auditioned for the 2014 series of The Voice UK, in the episode shown on 18 January 2014, and made it through it to the Battle Rounds but did not progress.

Kelsey also revealed in The Sun newspaper that after leaving The Voice she had had a breast enlargement to go from 34A to 34DD to boost her confidence; having lost 3 stone in weight, she had lost her curves.
