= James Hooton =

English actor (b. 1973)

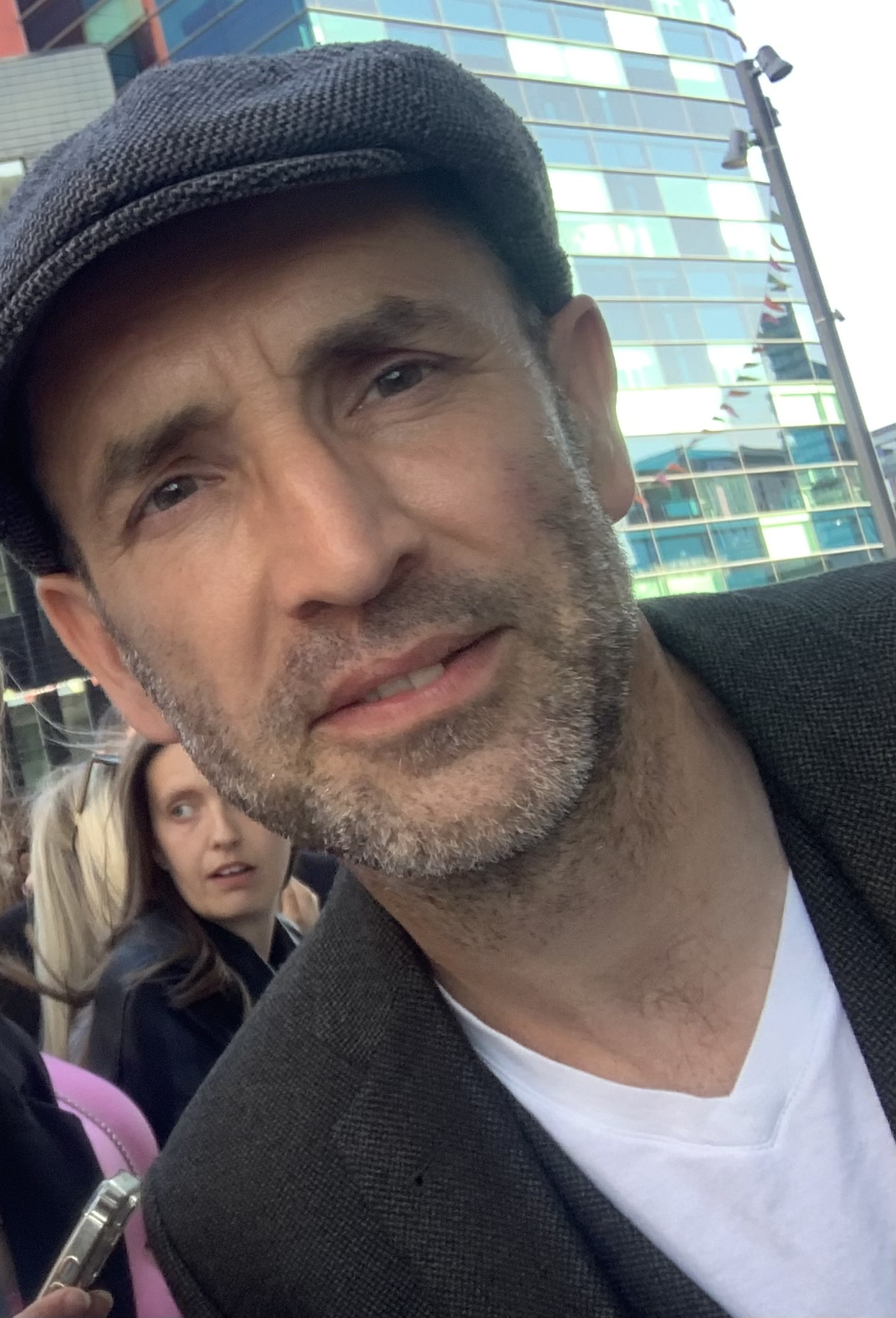
- Hooton in 2023
- Born: 13 July 1973 (age 53); Carlton, Nottinghamshire, England
- Occupation: Actor
- Years active: 1985–present
- Television: Emmerdale
- Partner: Nancy Lucas (2010–present)
- Children: 2

James Hooton (born 13 July 1973) is an English actor, best known for his role as Sam Dingle on the ITV soap opera Emmerdale, a role he has played since 1995.

== Early and personal life ==
Hooton was born and raised in Carlton, Nottinghamshire, where he attended Frank Wheldon Comprehensive School. He has been engaged to dance company owner Nancy Lucas since 2010, after they became engaged on St Valentine's Day. The couple have two children together.

== Career ==
In 1985, at the age of 12, he made his television debut in the children's TV series Your Mother Wouldn't Like It. He has also appeared in several other programmes, including Peak Practice, The Bill, Heartbeat and Touching Evil. In 1995, he was cast in the ITV soap opera Emmerdale as Sam Dingle. He filmed his first scene on 10 January 1995. In 1997, he appeared in director Shane Meadows' first feature film, Twenty Four Seven, where he played the character 'Wolfman' Knighty. Then a year later, he announced his decision to leave Emmerdale. He subsequently starred in The Loneliness of the Long-Distance Runner after Chris Gascoyne dropped out of the show, with Hooton having ten days to prepare for the role. In 2009, he attended the Eurogamer Expo alongside co-star Alex Carter where he revealed that he was trying to get sponsorship for a video game show he was planning to pitch to television studios. Hooton returned to Emmerdale in 2000. In 2012, Hooton returned to the stage after 15 years to star in a stage production titled Our Style is Legendary.
