= List of Emmerdale characters introduced in 2016 =

Emmerdale is a British soap opera first broadcast on 16 October 1972. The following is a list of characters that appeared in 2016, by order of first appearance. Pierce Harris (Jonathan Wrather), the husband of established character Tess Harris (Nicola Stephenson), was introduced in February, along with Ryan Harred (George Sampson) and Aaron Livesy's (Danny Miller) half-sister, Liv Flaherty (Isobel Steele). The first birth of the year was in March when Megan Macey (Gaynor Faye) and Jai Sharma's (Chris Bisson) daughter, Eliza Sharma, was born. Holly Barton's (Sophie Powles) ex-boyfriend Dean (Craig Vye) first appeared in March, while Ronnie Hale (John McArdle) was introduced in April as a relation to the White family. Tracy Shankley's (Amy Walsh) father, Frank Clayton (Michael Praed) joined the show in August and Dotty Thomas made the second birth of the year in September. Lawrence White's (John Bowe) daughter, Rebecca White (Emily Head), was introduced in October and the final character to be introduced in 2016 was Will Scott (Ben Gerrard), who made his first appearance in December. Additionally, multiple other characters appeared in 2016.

== DS Jason Wise ==
DS Jason Wise
- Emmerdale character
- Portrayed by: Neil Roberts
- Duration: 2016–2017, 2019–2020, 2023
- First appearance: Episode 7419; 8 February 2016
- Last appearance: Episode 9828; 6 November 2023
In-universe information
- Occupation: Detective Sergeant

DS Jason Wise, played by Neil Roberts is the detective who investigates the historic sex abuse allegations brought by Aaron Livesy (Danny Miller) against his father Gordon Livesy (Gary Mavers). Two weeks later, DS Wise lets Aaron's mother Chas Dingle (Lucy Pargeter) off with a warning after she vandalises Gordon's car and tells his neighbours that Gordon abuses children. A few days later, Robert Sugden (Ryan Hawley) gives DS Wise Gordon's ex-wife Sandra Flaherty's (Joanne Mitchell) address. Sandra denies knowing anything and refuses to be a witness for the defence or prosecution. DS Wise informs Aaron that another victim has come forward and that they now have enough evidence to charge Gordon. However, he later informs Chas and Robert that the witness has retracted his statement, but Gordon will still be charged. DS Wise attends Gordon's plea hearing, where Chas asks him why he did not say anything about Gordon faking the side effects of his cancer treatment. Gordon later tells DS Wise that the other witness was paid to give evidence against him and sends him after his daughter Liv Flaherty (Isobel Steele). Gordon is found guilty on all charges. Before Gordon's sentence hearing, DS Wise takes Liv home after she is caught shoplifting and he lets slip about the hearing. Days later, DS Wise breaks the news to Aaron and Liv that Gordon has died in prison. The following day, Liv texts DS Wise from Chas' phone asking him to come round quickly. When he arrives, Liv tells him Robert is responsible for Gordon's death, but DS Wise explains Gordon committed suicide. A few weeks later, DS Wise asks Chas out for a drink and she accepts. After their date, Chas invites him up to her room, but when DS Wise knocks over a box of old photos, she orders him to leave. He later return to arrest Robert. DS Wise questions Dawn Taylor (Olivia Bromley) when DI Mark Malone (Mark Womack) does not show up to work after she had filed a complaint about him. Wise returns to question Kim Tate (Claire King) and Will Taylor (Dean Andrews) about the death of Craig Reed (Ben Addis) and Kim reveals her horse trampled Craig to death after accidentally getting free.

== Pierce Harris ==
Pierce Harris
- Emmerdale character
- Portrayed by: Jonathan Wrather
- Duration: 2016–2017, 2020
- First appearance: Episode 7423; 11 February 2016
- Last appearance: Episode 8744; 27 February 2020
In-universe information
- Occupation: Lawyer
- Father: Tim Harris
- Mother: Martha Harris
- Wife: Tess Harris (until 2016); Rhona Goskirk (2017–2018)
- Sons: Marcus Dean
- Stepsons: Leo Goskirk

Pierce Harris, played by Jonathan Wrather, made his first screen appearance on 11 February 2016. The character and Wrather's casting were announced on 10 January 2016. Of his casting, Wrather said "I am thrilled to be joining Emmerdale. It's a great opportunity to be offered the chance to create a new character in one of TV's most popular shows, and I'm very excited to be working with such an outstanding cast and team." Pierce is the husband of established character, Tess Harris (Nicola Stephenson) and has been mentioned on several occasions since Tess' arrival. Tess has been having an affair with Paddy Kirk (Dominic Brunt), who was described as not expecting to meet Tess' husband.

Pierce turns up at the hospital to see his wife Tess, who was admitted after being struck by a car driven by a drunk Kirin Kotecha (Adam Fielding). Tess's friends, Paddy and his wife Rhona Goskirk (Zoe Henry), introduce themselves to Pierce, but he is led away by the doctors who want to discuss Tess's operation. Pierce is later told that Tess has died during surgery due to her injuries, and he rushes from the hospital. The following month, Pierce was given personal items of Tess' that were in her car. He discovered Tess had been having an affair and had a secret phone. He also found a brochure for the Mill Cottage development and wanted to have a look. Before looking at the development he went into The Woolpack for a drink where he saw Paddy and Rhona. He revealed that he had Tess's affair phone, which made Paddy squirm. Paddy's best friend Marlon Dingle (Mark Charnock) came to his rescue, but Rhona, who knew about the affair, agreed to meet with Pierce the following day. Pierce showed Rhona some of the texts Tess had sent to her lover, and after learning they were texting on Christmas Day and planning to go to Paris, Rhona cracked and revealed to Pierce that Paddy was Tess' mystery man.

Pierce wrote numerous bad reviews for Paddy and Rhona's vet's surgery on a local business review site. Rhona realised he was behind them and confronted Pierce. Pierce tried to make Rhona see that she was kidding herself that she could patch up her marriage to Paddy. A few days later, Pierce handed out flyers on Hotten Road, hoping to find a witness to Tess' death. Pierce handed Rhona and her friend Vanessa Woodfield (Michelle Hardwick) one, so Rhona invited him back to Smithy Cottage for a cup of tea. Pierce explained he had moved into a hotel since Tess died, so Rhona allowed him to temporarily stay with her and son Leo for a few days as she and Paddy had split up. Pierce continued looking for answers on how Tess died, and questioned Rakesh Kotecha (Pasha Bocarie) about whether he knew Tess, as Rakesh's was the owner of the flat development Tess had a brochure of. Rakesh denied knowing Tess, but Rhona later admitted that Rakesh's son Kirin was the police's main suspect in Tess's death before he scarpered. Pierce confronted Rakesh and called the police to say Rakesh was covering for his son. PC Williams visited Pierce and told him that, as there was no evidence of Rakesh being in contact with Kirin, the police couldn't do anything, although she told him the investigation was still ongoing. Pierce's manipulative relationship with Rhona ended in marriage, but his insecurity and jealousy caused him to rape her on their wedding night.

Pierce was found guilty of rape in July 2017 and sentenced to five years in prison. He was released on parole two and a half years later. Wrather reprised his role in 2020 in a previously unannounced twist. He returns as part of a "whodunnit" story focusing on the apparent murder of Graham Foster (Andrew Scarborough), where he is exposed as Graham's supposed murderer. Wrather's return was kept secret from the cast and crew with the character's name hidden in the scripts. He explained that he was told more about the story in small snippets and did not confirm how long Pierce would return for.

Pierce was responsible for kidnapping Vanessa Woodfield (Michelle Hardwick) and Johnny Woodfield (Luca Hepworth) due to the fact that Vanessa threatened to expose him. A terrified Rhona sees Pierce out of prison. She gets Pierce to confess to seemingly murdering Graham on video footage. Enraging him, Pierce gets stabbed in his arm with a horse tranquilliser and is then arrested for Graham’s alleged murder, kidnapping, and false imprisonment. Offscreen, Pierce pleads guilty and is then sentenced to life in prison. Pierce's son, Marcus Dean (Darcy Grey), is informed that Pierce has died whilst in prison from cancer.

== Ryan Harred ==
Ryan Harred
- Emmerdale character
- Portrayed by: George Sampson
- First appearance: Episode 7431; 22 February 2016
- Last appearance: Episode 7558; 18 July 2016

Ryan Harred, played by George Sampson, made his first screen appearance on 22 February 2016. Sampson's casting was announced on 14 January 2016 and originally appeared in four episodes. Show producers reintroduced the character for four episodes between May and July 2016.

On his casting, Sampson said, "I'm really excited to play a guest part in Emmerdale. The cast and crew have been really friendly, and the village is a spectacular place to be. It's such an iconic show and it's brilliant to be able to be a part of it." Sampson's character and storyline were initially kept secret ahead of his first scenes. The actor later revealed that his character is called Ryan and would be sharing scenes with Aaron Dingle (Danny Miller) and Robert Sugden (Ryan Hawley). Sampson described Ryan as "a lads' lad. He's a local guy who just wants to intervene in people's business. Where he can get what he wants in a certain situation, he will do so." On 15 June 2016, Sampson expressed an interest in joining the show's main cast.

Ryan first appears outside Gordon Livesy's (Gary Mavers) house when his ex-wife Chas Dingle (Lucy Pargeter) spraypaints "paedo" on his car, following the recent revelation, that Gordon abused their son, Aaron, when he was a child. Robert pays Ryan to be an invented sexual abuse victim so that Gordon can be charged after the abuse allegations made by Aaron are taken seriously. Chas discovers this and warns Robert that she will tell Aaron, but he convinces her not to. Aaron eventually learns the truth and implores Ryan to retract his statement, which he agrees to do. Ryan runs into Gordon's daughter Liv Flaherty (Isobel Steele) and she realises Ryan was the invented sexual abuse victim. Liv offers him £50,000 to tell the police the truth and Ryan agrees, but when Liv decides against the agreement, she cannot contact Ryan and Robert is arrested. Ryan later arrives at the pub, wanting the money he feels he is owed by Liv. Robert refuses to give him the money and Ryan threatens to report Robert for assault so Robert kidnaps Ryan. The next day, Ryan begs Robert to let him go and he does, which Aaron oversees. When Ryan confesses he is in £200 debt, Robert gives him £100 and warns him never to return to the village.

== Liv Flaherty ==
Liv Flaherty, played by Isobel Steele, made her first screen appearance on 25 February 2016. The character and casting was announced on 16 February. Liv is the daughter of Sandra Flaherty (Joanne Mitchell) and Gordon Livesy (Gary Mavers) and the half-sister of Aaron Dingle (Danny Miller). She was introduced as part of Aaron's child sex abuse storyline.

Liv became the first asexual character to be featured on a soap opera, and Steele has been praised by viewers and critics for her role in the storyline. Liv's other storylines have seen her become an alcoholic, be imprisoned for spiking Lisa Dingle's (Jane Cox) drink with ketamine, form relationships with Jacob Gallagher (Joe-Warren Plant) and Vinny Dingle (Bradley Johnson), be diagnosed with epilepsy, and expose numerous criminals for their behaviour. Within months of her debut appearance, Steele was nominated for the British Soap Award for Best Newcomer. She was then nominated for three further Newcomer awards, winning one at the TVTimes Awards. Steele has also been awarded two awards for Best Young Actor.

== Eliza Sharma ==
Eliza Sharma
- Emmerdale character
- Portrayed by: Kyrena Robinson
- Duration: 2016–2019
- First appearance: Episode 7441; 3 March 2016
- Last appearance: Episode 8578; 27 August 2019
In-universe information
- Other names: Eliza Macey
- Father: Jai Sharma
- Mother: Megan Macey
- Half-brothers: Robbie Lawson; Archie Breckle
- Half-sisters: Mia Macey
- Grandfathers: Dermot Macey; Rishi Sharma (adoptive)
- Grandmothers: Georgia Sharma
- Uncles: Declan Macey; Nikhil Sharma
- Aunts: Priya Sharma
- First cousins: Molly Sharma; Amba Metcalfe

Eliza Sharma (also Macey), portrayed by Kyrena Robinson, made her first appearance on 3 March 2016. She is the daughter of Jai Sharma (Chris Bisson) and Megan Macey (Gaynor Faye).

During Eliza's birth in March 2016, she suffers shoulder dystocia and her brain is deprived of oxygen for some time. Jai and Megan are told it's too early to tell if Eliza will have permanent brain damage. They are later informed that Eliza could have cerebral palsy. Eliza suffers a seizure and Megan is annoyed with Jai not being able to handle it. When Eliza arrives home, Megan refuses to let Jai near Eliza, but he soon convinces Megan to let him be a part of Eliza's life. In February 2017, when Megan has a meeting with a client, she forgets Eliza in the back of the car and when Jai rings about Eliza, Megan realises she left Eliza. Megan finds Eliza gone and the police are called, but she is returned by Nell Fairfax (Scarlett Archer), a recovering drug addict, who Megan accuses of kidnap and Megan is informed that social services will be told. Jai finds out from Lisa Dingle (Jane Cox) that Nell told the truth about trying to find Jai when she had Eliza. Megan and Jai meet with social services, where Jai suggests something formal should be put in place and Megan thinks Jai is using her mistake against her to get custody. Megan's boyfriend, Frank Clayton (Michael Praed) takes a photo of Jai talking to Nell and at another meeting, Jai assures Megan he does not want full custody. Megan lets Jai see Eliza, but when she finds out Jai is in a relationship with Nell and that his niece, Amba Metcalfe (Ava Jayasinghe), got hold of some pills of Nell's, which turn out to be anti-depressants in May 2017, Megan threatens to prevent Jai seeing Eliza. Frank persuades Megan to let Jai see Eliza, despite being with Nell. In October 2017, Eliza suffers a seizure in the care of Jai's sister and Amba's mother, Priya Sharma (Fiona Wade), and Leyla Harding (Roxy Shahidi). At the hospital, Megan and Jai are told that Eliza has bilateral spastic diplegia, a form of cerebral palsy. In March 2018, a day before her 2nd birthday, Eliza is distraught when a stressed Priya throws her plate at the wall in an outburst witnessed by Rishi Sharma (Bhasker Patel). On the following day, Jai, while changing Eliza shortly after she burst into tears during her party as Priya attempted to help her open a present, finds bruises on her legs which, believing them to be a result of seizures, leads him to take her to a doctor for investigation only for results to indicate otherwise. Priya confesses to her prior outburst but insists that she would not harm Eliza, nevertheless remaining under suspicion. A month later, Eliza's bruises return while she is with Megan, and are ultimately determined to have been caused by the medication prescribed to treat her condition, proving Priya's innocence.

== Dean ==
Dean
- Emmerdale character
- Portrayed by: Craig Vye
- First appearance: Episode 7460; 25 March 2016
- Last appearance: Episode 7594/7595; 23 August 2016
In-universe information
- Occupation: Drug dealer

Dean, played by Craig Vye, made his first screen appearance on 25 March 2016. The character and casting was announced on 22 March 2016. Vye was initially contracted for a short guest stint. Dean is the antagonizing ex-boyfriend of Holly Barton (Sophie Powles). Powles, who portrays Holly, stated "Holly was doing very well in London. She was having a great time and working hard, but then people she was working with on a weekend were doing the party lifestyle and dabbling in cocaine. Holly, being Holly, thought: 'I'll be fine now, I'm clean, I'll be fine with a bit of coke'. But then it turned from cocaine to harder substances and she got herself into a bit of a mess. Dean didn't want to go out with her anymore as she was a mess, but she still owes him money for the drugs she had. When Dean comes back, to everybody else it seems like he's just her boyfriend, but later on when everyone is gone we're left with a very intimidated Holly and a boyfriend demanding money." Dean will be dealt with by Holly's mother Moira Barton (Natalie J. Robb) and stepfather Cain Dingle (Jeff Hordley).

Holly arrives home to find Dean at the house and he has introduced himself as Holly's boyfriend. When Holly and Dean are left alone, Dean demands £2,000, a drug debt. Moira pays off the money, but Dean demands more. A plan is formed by Moira and Cain, using Charity Dingle (Emma Atkins) and Ross Barton (Michael Parr). Cain forcefully drags Holly into one of Charity's vans and drives off and Charity reports it stolen. Cain meets with Dean and bribes him into taking the van loaded with goods, but Holly tells Dean that Cain is most likely scamming him. When Dean persuades Holly to leave with him, he turns violent on Holly and Cain fights Dean and another man off Holly. Later, Charity and Ross spot Dean with the van and Ross phones the police, reporting Dean and causing his arrest later on.

== Ronnie Hale ==
Ronnie Hale
- Emmerdale character
- Portrayed by: John McArdle
- Duration: 2016–2017
- First appearance: Episode 7476; 14 April 2016
- Last appearance: Episode 7894/7895; 1 August 2017
In-universe information
- Occupation: Plumber (until 2016); Builder (2016–2017)
- Brothers: Brian Hale

Ronnie Hale, played by John McArdle, made his first screen appearance on 14 April 2016. Of his casting, McArdle stated "I am really pleased to be joining the cast of Emmerdale. The standard of the show is equal to anything I have worked on before and I am really happy to become part of that." The character was introduced as the potential biological father of established character Chrissie White (Louise Marwood). He will also be the centre of a big storyline at Home Farm. New show series producer, Iain MacLeod, stated "I am thrilled to welcome an actor of John's pedigree to the show. And in Ronnie, we have a character that will unearth every painful fragment of love and loss buried in the White family's past - with the odd unexploded bomb thrown in for good measure!"

Chrissie finds a love letter from Ronnie Hale in her mother, Ellen's, belongings, believing him to be her biological father after discovering that Lawrence White (John Bowe) is not. Chrissie calls Ronnie to Home Farm to fix a leak. Before he leaves, Chrissie shows him a picture of Ellen asking if he knew her, but Ronnie says he does not. Ronnie turns up at Home Farm looking for Lawrence. Lawrence tries to blackmail Ronnie into staying away, leading to an argument between the pair. Lawrence's wife, Bernice (Samantha Giles), interrupts the argument. Ronnie says goodbye to Lawrence before leaving. It is then discovered that the love letter that Ronnie wrote wasn't to Ellen, but it was to Lawrence. Ronnie and Lawrence were having an affair while Lawrence was married to Ellen. When Lawrence sees Ronnie talking to Chrissie's son Lachlan (Thomas Atkinson), he tells Ronnie to leave the village but Ronnie insists he's staying. Lawrence then asks Sam Dingle (James Hooton) to shoot him. Sam reluctantly agrees. When Sam goes to shoot Ronnie he talks him down and Sam gives him the gun. Ronnie then pays Lawrence a visit and gives him back the gun threatening to tell the police about his plan to kill him. Lawrence accidentally punches Ronnie and Ronnie leaves telling Lawrence that he won't be bothering him again.

Ronnie saves Nicola King (Nicola Wheeler) from a fire started by Rakesh Kotecha (Pasha Bocarie). He goes back in for Rakesh and his wife Priya (Fiona Wade), who are not in the house. He is knocked unconscious when he is hit over the head with a candlestick. He is later pulled out by Rakesh and Carly Hope (Gemma Atkinson). The next day, Lawrence visits Ronnie in hospital and apologises for being so cruel to him. He is seen holding his hand by Chrissie's boyfriend, Andy Sugden (Kelvin Fletcher). Just after Lawrence leaves, Ronnie moves his head. He discharges himself the following day. Douglas Potts (Duncan Preston) gives him a place to stay in the B&B. Ronnie later finds an ornament Priya bought into the house before the fire started. He then confronts Rakesh and suspects that he started the fire. Rakesh admits that he did and Ronnie tells him he has no choice but to tell the police. However, when the police question Ronnie he keeps quiet about Rakesh's involvement.

Bernice secretly books a hotel room for Ronnie and Lawrence although Lawrence thinks it is for him and Bernice. When Lawrence goes ahead he is surprised to see Ronnie there. Lawrence leaves Bernice a message telling her that he doesn't blame her and he is coming home but is stopped by Ronnie. The pair break down in tears and admit their feelings for each other while Bernice leaves for the airport in a taxi. The next day, Chrissie finds a love letter written from Ronnie to Lawrence and hints that Ronnie is her father. She then humiliates both Ronnie and Lawrence in front of the whole pub, in which Ronnie admits that he and Lawrence were lovers. Chrissie and Lachlan are then thrown out of Home Farm by Lawrence and go to stay in the B&B where Ronnie is still staying. Chrissie confides in Ronnie about how Lawrence threw her out and Ronnie decides to go and talk to him. When he does so, Lawrence comes out with a gun threatening to shoot Ronnie. Ronnie doesn't believe that Lawrence would have it in him to shoot him. Lawrence shoots a hole in the window of Ronnie's van and Ronnie drives off while Lawrence breaks down on the doorstep.

After Lawrence is shot by Lachlan, there are several suspects. Chrissie frames and destroys Andy by putting him on the path of destruction after discovering he had sex with Bernice, and he is charged with attempted murder. Chrissie pretends to help Andy and accuses Ronnie of shooting Lawrence in front of a whole pub. This upsets Ronnie and he denies the allegations. Chrissie later apologises to Ronnie.

In 2017, Ronnie and Lawrence plan to move to Cornwall; however, he is traumatised when he hears that Lawrence drove Chrissie's real father to suicide. He plans to leave alone, however, Lawrence's biological daughter Rebecca tells him that he'll call him in five minutes. Sadly, Lawrence collapses due to an aneurysm, and Ronnie discards his mobile phone and boards a train, leaving the village for good.

== Angie Bailey ==
Angie Bailey
- Emmerdale character
- Portrayed by: Nina Toussaint-White
- First appearance: Episode 7488; 28 April 2016
- Last appearance: Episode 7591; 18 August 2016
In-universe information
- Husband: Jermaine Bailey (2008-?)

Angie Bailey, played by Nina Toussaint-White is Jermaine Bailey's (Micah Balfour) wife and trustee of the charity 'Cerebral Palsy Yorkshire'. Angie is a doctor like her husband. Angie first appears at the charity fundraiser of Megan Macey (Gaynor Faye). She meets Belle Dingle (Eden Taylor-Draper) who compliments her on her necklace. Belle then plants her lipstick in Jermaine's car to try and expose their affair. Angie finds the lipstick but Jermaine lies and says that he took a colleague home and it must be hers. She is seen again when she walks into Jermaine's surgery with him and finds Cain Dingle (Jeff Hordley) in his room. Angie demands that Cain leave or she would call security. Angie is shocked when Cain reveals that Jermaine is having an affair with a seventeen-year-old patient but refuses to believe him. Belle enters the room and exposes the affair by revealing that she planted lipstick in the car. However, Jermaine tells Angie and Cain that Belle is stalking him and he is offering her guidance for her mental health. Angie believes him and tells Belle to find herself a new general practitioner. After, Angie wants answers for Belle's behaviour and storms into the sweet factory. She confronts Belle and reveals Jermaine's accusations in front of her parents. Belle's friend, Lachlan White (Thomas Atkinson), trashes her house and Angie finds Belle, threatening to report her to the police. She returns to Emmerdale and soon discovers the truth about the affair after Belle breaks down. She plans her revenge on Jermaine. She makes him lose his job as a doctor and throws him out of her house. She finds out about Belle's pregnancy and demands answers from Charity Dingle (Emma Atkins). When Belle attempts to feign a miscarriage, Angie sees her at the hospital and tells her that she had a miscarriage and it affected the couple.

== Frank Clayton ==
Frank Clayton
- Emmerdale character
- Portrayed by: Michael Praed
- Duration: 2016–2019
- First appearance: Episode 7583; 11 August 2016
- Last appearance: Episode 8554; 1 August 2019
In-universe information
- Occupation: Criminal; Sweet Packer
- Daughters: Tracy Shankley; Vanessa Woodfield
- Grandsons: Johnny Woodfield
- Granddaughters: Frankie

Francis "Frank" Clayton, played by Michael Praed, made his first screen appearance in 2016. The character and casting was announced on 9 July 2016. Of his casting, Praed stated "I'm thrilled to be joining the cast of Emmerdale to play the role of Frank. From what I understand his life is fairly complicated and I'm looking forward to getting to know him and portraying this complex man."

The character was introduced as the father of established character Tracy Shankley (Amy Walsh). He will first appear when unbeknownst to her, Tracy's boyfriend David Metcalfe (Matthew Wolfenden) visits him in prison, where he has spent "the last few years". Series producer Iain MacLeod stated "The character of Frank is really fascinating: flawed, funny, flirtatious – even fatherly, when it suits him! His tale is a story of a man trying to find redemption in the face of huge temptation, with a massive twist or two thrown in for good measure. I am thrilled that Michael is on board in the role. He is an actor of real skill and understatement and a brilliant addition to the cast."

Frank is a convicted criminal and has spent the last few years in prison. His daughter, Tracy's boyfriend, David Metcalfe (Matthew Wolfenden), visits him in prison and tells him about his testicular cancer. David also informs him about his relationship with Tracy and that they're getting married. Frank tells David he's been writing to her and wants to reconcile with her, and that he is being released. He later calls Vanessa Woodfield (Michelle Hardwick), who also turns out to be his daughter.

A few days later, Vanessa and Tracy receive a phonecall explaining that Frank has been hospitalised after a fight in prison. Vanessa visits him in hospital the next day. She refuses to call him, "dad", and uses his name. Frank asks her if she wants to talk about her ex-boyfriend Kirin Kotecha (Adam Fielding) and if he can see a photo of her infant son, Johnny, which she shows him. Frank tells Vanessa a fake story about when they went away together, which infuriates Vanessa and she storms out, just as Frank suffers a seizure. The doctors inform Vanessa that the injuries Frank sustained have created several blood clots in his lungs and that he has been moved to intensive care and is in a coma. David and Tracy later visit Frank and are also informed of this. Tracy decides that visiting Frank was a bad idea and leaves, however she returns the following day. Tracy tells Frank that she remembers little about him. She finds some photos of them together when she was a child. The following week, Vanessa and Tracy receive a phonecall to say that Frank is being brought out of the coma. Vanessa visits him and sees Tracy there. The pair have engage in a blazing argument and the nurse threatens to call security. Frank regains consciousness and tells Vanessa and Tracy that they are half-sisters. Neither can forgive Frank for not telling them the truth and disown him.

A few weeks later, Vanessa calls Frank and tells him that he can stay with her, on the condition that he reconciles with Tracy. He is released a few days later. Vanessa tells Frank not to tell anybody that he is her father. They then go for a drink in the pub, where Tracy and her friend Leyla Harding (Roxy Shahidi) are. Tracy furious that Frank is moving in with Vanessa and while she shouts at Vanessa, Frank collapses. Tracy is adamant that she wants nothing more to do with Frank and walks out. Charity Dingle (Emma Atkins) later suspects that Frank pretended to collapse to stop Vanessa and Tracy arguing. He tells Vanessa it is best they forget about Tracy, which she and David overhear. Frank is also introduced to David's father Eric Pollard (Chris Chittell). Tracy decides to give Frank another chance after being persuaded by David. They have drinks to celebrate while Tracy puts Eric's credit card in Frank's pocket to make him look like a thief. She arrange to meet him so she can take it back but puts it back in. When Eric realises his credit card his missing he immediately suspects Frank and calls the police and Frank is arrested. He is later charged with theft and Vanessa tells Tracy that Frank is being sent back to prison. Tracy later confesses the truth to Eric and he calls the police to drop the charges and Frank is released. He believes Eric put his credit card in his pocket on purpose and grabs hold of him. He lets go when Tracy confesses to him. Frank later tells Vanessa the truth and she apologises for believing he could ever have stolen Eric's credit card. He later tells Tracy he forgives her. Tracy tells Frank that he has no right to forgive her and that she hates him for the way he treated her and her mother and that she will never forgive him. Frank just walks away. When David finds out his cancer is gone him and Tracy celebrate but throws a drink at Frank when he interrupts the stag and hen do. Eric tries to convince Frank to stay away from Tracy. When Tracy sees him in carrying a back pack she asks him what his doing. Frank tells her he wants to do right by her and that his leaving the village. Tracy tells him to prove that he loves her. Frank tells her to get into the back of his car which she does and he drives off with Tracy clinging on in the back of the car. The next day Tracy wakes up to discover she's in a woods with Frank asleep in the driving seat. She wakes him up and isn't impressed with him. She calls Vanessa and tells her she's in a woods with Frank and he'll text her the directions. While they wait for her Frank shows Tracy a tree he carved her name into. He also tells her that was where her mother went into labour with her and that he couldn't help crying and that the labour lasted 18 hours. Vanessa then arrives and Tracy goes to get her wedding dress on. Vanessa confronts Frank and asks him what he was doing. Tracy then gets out of the car with the wedding dress on. Vanessa and Frank think she looks stunning. Vanessa car then rolls into a pond. Tracy tries to stop it but ends up falling into a big piece of mud causing her wedding dress to get muddy. She is angry with Frank as he is the reason they ended up there. They then hear a car and try catch it but miss it causing Tracy get splashed by a puddle. Frank later brings them a tractor to get to the church. They soon get there to David's relief. Tracy allows Frank to walk her up to the isle. During the wedding ceremony Tracy finds a frog in her dress and her and David say their vows and officially become husband and wife. Eric later warns Frank not to hurt Tracy.

Frank finds a new love interest in Megan Macey (Gaynor Faye). However, he lies to her about his criminal past and tells her he's just returned from travelling in Australia. Leyla warns her about him but the pair sleep together. After finding out about Frank's criminal past from Leyla, Megan dumps him on the spot with Vanessa watching.

Frank starts using Johnny as an excuse to spend more time with Megan. He asks her on a date to go the dales on a motorbike. Megan tells him it would be better if they just went for a drive with Johnny and her intranet daughter Eliza. Frank tells her that would be boring as they don't do much when their that young which Vanessa overhears and tells Frank she'll never trust him with Johnny again and Megan turns down his date. She later asks Tracy if Frank can move in with her and David as his taking up to much space which they don't agree to but Vanessa doesn't give them a choice.

Megan accidentally punches Frank when he comes up to her wearing a mask at a Halloween party. She starts avoiding Frank and he sees her talking to Dr. Jermaine Bailey (Micah Balfour). When Frank starts working at David's shop he serves Megan's friend Sam Dingle (James Hooton). He confides in him about everything and Sam tries to get them a date. Megan lets Frank mind Eliza which her father Jai Sharma (Chris Bisson) isn't happy about when he finds out that Frank was in prison and orders Megan to ask him what he was in there for. Megan does what Jai asks. Frank tells her that he was on a night out when he got into a fight with someone and accidentally knocked him out. Megan decides that she can't take any chances and officially ends things with Frank. She meets him the next day and decides to give him another chance which Jai isn't impressed about.

Frank and Megan go on a date to a restaurant where Frank sees a familiar face from the past, a man called Bobby working. During dinner he starts to get shifty with Megan and eventually decides to leave with her. On his way out Bobby confronts Frank. Megan isn't happy with him for leaving early and tells him he can make it up to her by spending the night with her which he does. He is shifty again the next morning and later decides to end their relationship which Megan reacts badly to. A week later it's David's birthday and Frank and Tracy decide to organise a surprise parachute jump for him. David later finds out about this thanks to Eric but tells Tracy he knew anyway because she left the stuff lying around and tells her that he wants to raise money for the cancer fund instead. Frank decides t help by dressing up as an elf while Bobby tracks him down and arrives in the village and sees him dressed as the elf. He meets Tracy and tells her he wants to speak to Frank. Tracy tells him his busy and they have a drink together while he waits for him. Tracy tells Bobby why Frank was in prison. He comes into the pub and sees Bobby. Vanessa comes into the pub to and Bobby sees her. They leave them alone and Bobby guesses that their Frank's daughters. Frank tells Bobby that his changed. Bobby tells Frank what Tracy told him about him being in prison. Later Bobby confronts Frank and tells him his ruined his life and demands money from him by tomorrow. He punches Frank in the gut and tells him that if he doesn't have it by then he'll tell Vanessa and Tracy that he really went to prison for conning him. The following day Frank arranges to meet Bobby the following day and steals David's money for the cancer fund to pay him off. When Frank meets Bobby he has a baseball bat and Frank tries to run but Bobby attacks him with the baseball bat. Frank has the money in a safe and lets Bobby take it. He soon returns to the village and informs Vanessa, Tracy and David about this. He tells Tracy and David he'll go to the police. However, when he doesn't he goes round to Vanessa's where there is a police officer waiting for him. Frank lies to the police about what happened and they aren't very convinced by his story. He later decides to go away for a while. Vanessa demands to know if he took the charity money or not and tells him not to come back if he walks out. Tracy and David soon come round and Frank is forced to admit that he took the charity money and that fraud was the real reason he was in prison. Tracy is upset that Frank lied to her. He decides to leave anyhow despite Vanessa's ultimatum. He returns a day later and is forgiven by Tracy but not by Vanessa. He later promises that any money he earns from now on will go to the cancer fund.

Frank later goes into crime with Charity. He gives her more detail about his criminal past which she records on her phone. She blackmails him and threatens to tell a Vanessa and Tracy everything. He agrees to help her rob home farm and they pretend to be a married couple while they try to get into business. The businessman has diamonds and when he loses them he tells Frank and Charity no one goes anywhere until he finds them. Megan arrives but doesn't see anything. TpFrank and Charity eventually get rid of the businessman and Frank and Charity also leave when they end up having sex. When the owners of home farm, Lawrence White (John Bowe) his daughter Rebecca (Emily Head) and his adoptive daughter Chrissie (Louise Marwood) find out about this, they confront Charity and threaten to call the police. Charity tells Frank that if she goes to prison for this, he's going with her. Frank later agrees to spend the night with a Charity but later tells her he only did it so he could delete the recording of him telling her about his past.

In July 2017, Megan gives Frank a share of her business. Tracy and David later overhear Frank and Charity talking about their one night stand. She confronts him about this and tells him that unless he tells her everything, she will tell Megan. Frank tells her about Charity's blackmail. Tracy later tells Megan the truth during a family meal and she slaps Charity in the face and ends her relationship with Frank. He spends the night on Vanessa's sofa. Megan later dumps Frank's clothes in Charity's. She later attempts to throw paint over her car but Charity's daughter Debbie (Charley Webb) gives her a sob story about her kids needing the car. Charity goads Megan into throwing the paint over her. Frank later begs Megan for a second chance but she rejects him. The following day, Frank tries to get a choir singing outside Megan's business. She again, refuses to take him back and knees him in the groin. He later tries to give her flowers but she refuses to take them and tells Frank she's going on holiday and that she expects him to have moved on from her when she gets back. Megan returns over a week later. Frank offers her a business deal, which she agrees to her. Frank later proposes to Megan and she walks away but later accepts and they get back together.

Lydia Hart (Karen Blick) finds out that Frank has been stealing money from the business. She tries to tell Megan but she refuses to believe her and stands by Frank. Tracy later confronts Frank and locks him in the shop until he admits the truth. Frank texts Megan and tells her about this. Megan gets Frank out of the shop. They then go to the pub to celebrate their engagement. Charity suspects Megan of stringing Frank along. Megan tries to convince Charity that there is no revenge but later tells her that she plans on putting Frank back in prison by stealing money from the business and framing Frank.

Megan starts to have second thoughts about the revenge until Charity steels Frank's phone and sends a text to herself saying he has a hotel room booked for them. He sets up a kids charity. Most of the residents are interested in contributing but Megan turns them off it. She later organises a business trip to Australia and Frank books a surprise wedding. He asks Vanessa and Tracy to be bridesmaids and they say yes. Marlon Dingle (Mark Charnock) contributes to the charity along with Rishi Sharma (Bhasker Patel). Frank soon realises there is a problem and confronts a Megan. She tells him she'll call a solicitor and sort it out. Marlon soon finds out that he could lose all his money and Frank calls the bank and Charity answers. She puts on a foreign accent in which she assures Marlon his money is safe. The following day, Megan finds out that Charity sent the text about Frank booking a hotel room and calls off the revenge. Charity locks her in the pub cellar and calls the police. Frank soon finds a bag of cash and he police arrive. He escapes out the back door. He asks Vanessa and Tracy to help him escape and they agree. Marlon soon lets Megan out of the cellar and tries to call the police and tell them there was a mix up before calling Frank and telling him not to run. A few minutes later, he comes into the pub. Megan admits that she wanted to get revenge, while Charity calls the police. A few minutes later, they walk into the pub and arrest Frank for fraud. The following day, most of the locals are talking about Frank. Megan goes to the police station and tells them that she's at fault and that Frank's completely innocent. He is later released and tells Megan that their relationship is over, though they would eventually reconcile a couple of months later.

On 1 August 2019, Frank discovers that the factory is on fire and that Tracy is inside the building. He rushes in to save her and manages to bring her to safety, but then rushes back in to retrieve the engagement ring that he brought for Megan - with the intent of proposing to her. Just as he emerges outside, however, Frank is caught in the explosion and is thrown against one of the factory vans in the blast. The arriving paramedics instantly try to revive Frank to no avail, and he ultimately passes away in front of both his daughters and Megan along with several other residents.

In 2017, Laura-Jayne Tyler from Inside Soap criticised the use of the character, writing, "What is the plan for Frank? He's tagging on to the end of Megan's custody battle snore-fest when he should be seducing and scamming left, right and centre. Make it happen, Emmerdale!"

== Dotty Thomas ==
Dotty Thomas
- Emmerdale character
- Portrayed by: Tilly-Rue Foster (2016–present); Ellerie Carroll (2016)
- Duration: 2016–present
- First appearance: Episode 7606; 2 September 2016
In-universe information
- Father: Ashley Thomas
- Mother: Laurel Thomas
- Stepfather: Jai Sharma
- Brothers: Arthur Thomas
- Half-sisters: Gabby Thomas
- Grandfathers: Sandy Thomas; Douglas Potts
- Grandmothers: Dorothy Thomas; Hilary Potts
- Uncles: Luke Thomas
- Aunts: Karen Thomas
- Nephews: Thomas Tate
- First cousins: Jasmine Thomas

Dotty Thomas, played by Tilly-Rue Foster and Ellerie Carroll, made her first appearance on 2 September 2016. She is the daughter of Ashley (John Middleton) and Laurel Thomas (Charlotte Bellamy), the sister of Arthur Thomas (Alfie Clarke) and half-sister of Gabby Thomas (Rosie Bentham).

Laurel starts getting twinges at work and is taken to hospital by Rishi Sharma (Bhasker Patel), however, it turns out to be a false alarm and she is sent home. A few hours later, Laurel's water breaks and she goes into labour. Ashley delivers their daughter, who they decide to name Dotty after Ashley's & Luke's late mother and Sandy's late wife, Dorothy. Ashley has dementia and at Dotty's christening, he does not remember that Dotty is his daughter and is upset when he does remember. His dementia begins to get worse and the family get a carer, Will (Ben Gerrard) to help out, but when he is ill, Gabby is forced to look after Dotty and Ashley. Laurel is angry with Gabby when Ashley is found alone after Gabby had to change Dotty. Ashley moves into a care home, but when he is diagnosed with pneumonia, Laurel brings him home, where he later dies.

David Brown from Radio Times said that the birth of Dotty "provided a rare moment of contentment and happiness for the Thomases, who are currently coping with Ashley’s diagnosis of early-onset vascular dementia." Bellamy said that following Ashley's death, Laurel's focus "will be to look after everyone, from Sandy down to little Dotty."

== Lydia Dingle ==
Lydia Dingle
- Emmerdale character
- Portrayed by: Karen Blick
- Duration: 2016–present
- First appearance: Episode 7619 19 September 2016
In-universe information
- Other names: Jenny Finn; Lydia Hart
- Occupation: Cleaner
- Mother: Agatha Finn
- Sisters: Beth Finn
- Husband: Steve Hart (backstory); Sam Dingle (2020–present)
- Sons: Toby Finn
- Stepsons: Samson Dingle

Lydia Dingle (also Hart), played by Karen Blick, made her first appearance on 19 September 2016. Lydia is the leader of a bereavement support group that Jimmy King (Nick Miles) attends by mistake. He explains that his wife has died and Lydia supports him, unaware his wife is alive. Lydia later arrives at the local vets and agrees to a date with vet Paddy Kirk (Dominic Brunt). After he is warned about Lydia's personality, Rhona Goskirk (Zoë Henry) and Chas Dingle (Lucy Pargeter) claim to be Paddy's wife and mistress respectively, outraging Lydia. She returns after meeting Rishi Sharma (Bhasker Patel) on a dating website and agreeing to go on a date. Despite deciding not to go on a second date with Rishi, Lydia is employed as a cleaner in his factory as well as at Home Farm estate. Lydia later goes on a date with Sam Dingle (James Hooton), but he decides to focus on his son instead. After helping Arthur Thomas (Alfie Clarke) grieve for his father Ashley (John Middleton), Sam suggests that Lydia begin lodging with the Thomas family.

Over time, Sam and Lydia fall in love, and she agrees to adopt his son, Samson Dingle (Sam Hall). When a story in the local newspaper is written about the body of a dead baby being found underneath the school, Lydia begins acting strangely. She flees from the village, but upon her return, she reveals that the newspaper story is about her. She explains that when she was a teenager, she gave birth to a stillborn baby, Toby. Unsure of what to do, she buried the baby at the school and left home. Mandy Dingle (Lisa Riley) helps Lydia to find her family: mother Agatha Finn (Judith Barker) and sister Beth Finn (Jeanette Percival). Agatha informs Lydia that her father was a carrier of Huntington's disease and that she is too. Sam tries to persuade Lydia to get tested to see if it will affect her, but she refuses.

Blick expressed her nervousness about being a key part of the Huntington's storyline due to its seriousness. She explained: "Whenever you get a fantastic story as an actor it's a double-edged sword, you're delighted to be able to really get your teeth into it. But there is the challenge of 'I need to do this justice'. It's a really powerful storyline that affects so many families and individuals across the world, and people in generations of families that have been affected by this disease, and having spoken to people and done research, you understand the impact that has on families." Blick added that if Lydia is diagnosed with the disease, it would be a "challenge" that she would be "daunted" by, from an acting perspective.

Lydia's stillborn baby storyline is revisited when the father of the baby arrives in the village. Craig Reed's (Ben Addis) arrival shakes Lydia and it soon transpires that the pair grew up together in a children's home. After Craig meets Lydia at a careers fair in the village, it was confirmed that Craig would feature prominently on-screen after Lydia accepts a job offer from him. He was introduced as a successful businessman with a fancy car that impresses Samson. It was hinted by Digital Spy's Daniel Kilkelly that Craig's presence would make Sam feel threatened. Shortly after Craig's introduction, it was announced that he would rape Lydia in an issue-led storyline that Blick described as the most challenging storyline she had covered in her career. The soap and Blick herself worked with Rape Crisis England & Wales to depict the portrayal accurately.

== Rebecca White ==
Rebecca White
- Emmerdale character
- Portrayed by: Emily Head
- Duration: 2016–2018
- First appearance: Episode 7638; 11 October 2016
- Last appearance: Episode 8303; 2 November 2018
In-universe information
- Occupation: Businesswoman
- Father: Lawrence White
- Mother: Ellen White
- Half-sisters: Chrissie White
- Sons: Sebastian White
- Uncles: Henry White
- Nephews: Lachlan White

Rebecca White, played by Emily Head, made her first screen appearance on 11 October 2016. Head's casting was announced on 12 September, while the character has often been referred to by members of her family. Of joining the show, Head commented "I am really looking forward to joining the Emmerdale cast, and so excited to be the one to put a face to the name Rebecca White. I can't wait to see how the village reacts to her arrival." Rebecca made a previously unannounced departure on 2 November 2018.

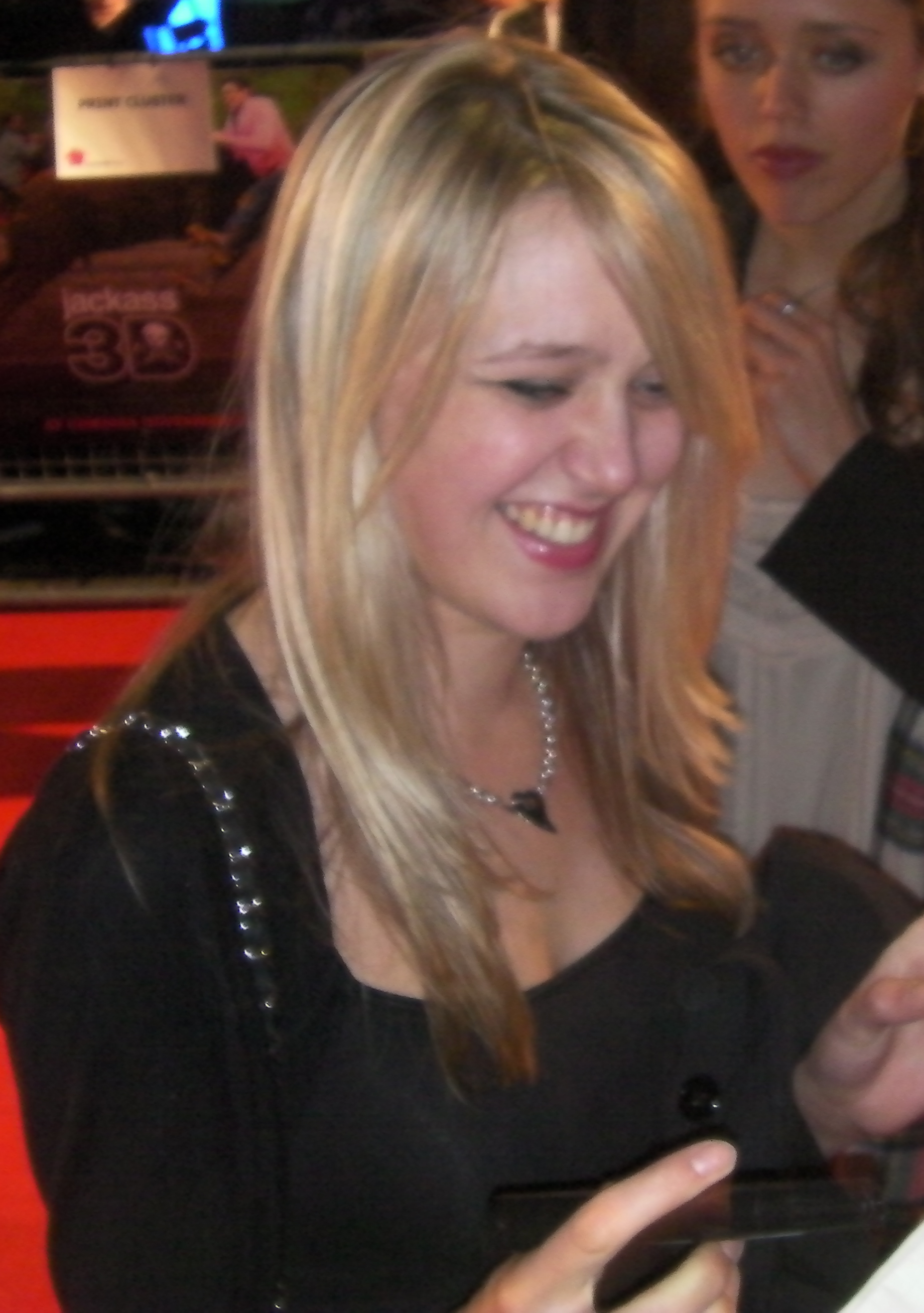
Emily Head was introduced as Rebecca in October.

Rebecca had "a dramatic entrance", as she joined her father Lawrence (John Bowe), sister Chrissie (Louise Marwood) and nephew Lachlan White (Thomas Atkinson) in the village. The show's series producer Iain MacLeod described Rebecca as "funny, feisty and flirtatious" and added that she had "a good heart." A reporter writing for the Inside Soap Yearbook described Rebecca's entrance as "a great arrival", before noting that she "swept into Emmerdale village courtesy of a helicopter". In August 2017, Head was longlisted for Best Newcomer at the Inside Soap Awards. She did not progress to the viewer-voted shortlist.

Rebecca first arrives by helicopter in the village during Ashley Thomas's (John Middleton) dementia fundraising event. This upsets Chrissie and the locals as Chrissie caused a helicopter crash the previous year, killing two people. The Whites are delighted to see her, and she angrily slaps Chrissie's former husband, Robert Sugden (Ryan Hawley), for cheating on Chrissie with another man, Aaron Livesy (Danny Miller). It is later revealed that Robert asked Rebecca to come to Emmerdale to help him expose Chrissie for framing his adoptive brother Andy Sugden (Kelvin Fletcher) for shooting Lawrence. Rebecca is also aware that Chrissie is not Lawrence's biological daughter. The following day, Rebecca attempts to lure Robert into bed and it becomes clear that they had an affair while he was engaged to Chrissie, which her son Lachlan overhears. Rebecca kisses Robert but he rejects her, stating that he is now certain that he is bisexual and very much in love with his boyfriend, Aaron. On Rebecca's birthday, Lachlan finds Chrissie's birthday card ripped up and in the fire, so exposes her affair with Robert to Chrissie and Lawrence. Chrissie slaps Rebecca but Rebecca slaps her back, and upon returning to Home Farm, Rebecca reveals that she knows Chrissie is not Lawrence's daughter and that she has taken a DNA sample from Lawrence to see if he is her biological father. The results reveal that Rebecca is Lawrence's biological daughter, panicking Chrissie. She also promises to stay in Emmerdale to protect Lawrence from Chrissie and Lachlan. Rebecca then persuades Lawrence to give her a role in the family business, further angering Chrissie.

Rebecca makes Lachlan think that Robert has found the evidence incriminating him and follows him to the stream where the evidence is concealed. Chrissie later realises what Rebecca is up to, so she and Lachlan confront her outside The Woolpack. When Rebecca tries to walk away, there is a scuffle between her and Chrissie, resulting in Rebecca being knocked unconscious after Chrissie pushes her over. Chrissie and Lachlan run away with the evidence and Doug Potts (Duncan Preston) finds Rebecca. At the Whites' bonfire party, Rebecca arrives and tells the village that Lachlan shot Lawrence and that Chrissie framed Andy, bitter that Chrissie and Lachlan left her for dead. Lachlan is subsequently arrested and imprisoned for shooting Lawrence, making Chrissie loathe Rebecca.

Aaron steals money from Home Farm, which Rebecca discovers and confronts him about. He explains his reasons for the theft so Rebecca does not inform the police and suggests that he should use the money to buy a family home. Chrissie later hides their mother's wedding ring and accuses Rebecca of stealing it, however, when Rebecca realises the truth, they scuffle and Chrissie falls over the staircase and through a glass table. Rebecca calls an ambulance and Chrissie threatens to claim Rebecca pushed her. When Lawrence discovers Chrissie's intentions, he reconciles them. Rebecca later has sex with an intoxicated Robert and discovers she is pregnant. This scene was considered controversial as Robert was drunk, and Rebecca sober. It was considered controversial as a rival soap was running a similar storyline regarding assault at the time. However the subject of consent was not brought up in the show, (nor was it ever intended to be), which drew criticism at the time it aired. Robert asks her to have an abortion. She reveals that before arriving in the village, she also got pregnant while sleeping with her sister's partner and Robert asked her to have an abortion. When she begins having stomach cramps, she fears she is miscarrying but after doctors confirm she is not, Rebecca makes amends with Chrissie and leaves the village but returns soon after. Rebecca gives birth to a baby boy in November 2017 and names him Sebastian. No paternity test for the child was ever taken, despite Rebecca being in a relationship with Ross Barton around the time of conception.

In January 2018, Rebecca planned to emigrate to Australia with her family, taking Sebastian without Robert's knowledge. However, Robert hired a private investigator, and discovered the family's plans. He took Sebastian, and after seeing Robert leave, the family jumped in the car and went in pursuit. However, the consequences end up being tragic as Lachlan has a psychopathic moment and grabs the wheel, steering the vehicle into the path of an oncoming lorry. The crash kills both Lawrence and Chrissie, whilst Rebecca is left in a coma, although Lachlan survives with just cuts and bruises. He tries killing Rebecca whilst she is in a coma but doesn’t succeed. Rebecca is later diagnosed with executive dysfunction, a condition caused by a trauma which leads to memory loss with neurocognitive deficits and behavioural symptoms.

When she wakes up she agrees to let Robert and Aaron care for their son for his safety, due to her executive dysfunction. Shortly thereafter she is gaslit by nephew Lachlan into believing she was responsible for the car crash. After she walks in on Robert and Liv unconscious at Mill Cottage, Lachlan prevents her from calling them an ambulance, leading to her realising that Lachlan was responsible and so he kidnaps her and holds her captive in a cabin in the woods. After her attempts to reason with him and later escape are unsuccessful, he attempts to kill her, only to change his mind at the last minute for an unknown reason. He hands over her care to a nurse who keeps her drugged and locked up. During this time, Lachlan has led the villagers to believe that Rebecca has fled of her own free will, leaving her son behind. When Lachlan’s crimes come to light, it becomes apparent that Rebecca may have become one of his victims. The nurse, upon realising that Lachlan had lied to her and eager to escape prosecution for being his unknowing cohort, releases Rebecca whereupon she is discovered wandering around randomly in the Emmerdale cemetery by Robert, Aaron and Victoria. She later departed the village with Ross Barton and Seb for Liverpool. In January 2019, Rebecca called Belle to tell her that Lachlan had been sentenced to life imprisonment, much to her relief.

In October 2024, Ross, returns to the village and says they split a couple of years ago and that later on, Rebecca died from surgical complications.

== Kasim Sabet ==
Kasim Sabet
- Emmerdale character
- Portrayed by: Ethan Kai
- Duration: 2016–2017
- First appearance: Episode 7647; 20 October 2016
- Last appearance: Episode 7750; 16 February 2017
In-universe information
- Father: Paul Sabet

Kasim Sabet, played by Ethan Kai, made his first screen appearance on 20 October 2016. He was originally credited as Crash Victim when he involved in a multiple-car pile-up on the Hotten Bypass and saved by Finn Barton (Joe Gill). He was left comatose for several months and Finn regularly visits him until he is moved hospitals. When Karim recovers, he begins a relationship with Finn and they sleep with each other for the first time before Christmas. His boyfriends mother Emma Barton (Gillian Kearney) is overbearing which places strain on the relationship. Finn buys them tickets to see Kylie Minogue in Australia despite warnings from his family. The relationship ends when Kasim believes Finn is too clingy. In January, Aaron Livesy (Danny Miller) beats Kasim up. In February, Finn breaks into Kasim's house intending to trash the place.

== Will Scott ==
Will Scott
- Emmerdale character
- Portrayed by: Ben Gerrard
- Duration: 2016–2017
- First appearance: Episode 7694; 14 December 2016
- Last appearance: Episode 7798; 13 April 2017
In-universe information
- Occupation: Social worker

Will Scott, played by Ben Gerrard, made his first screen appearance on 14 December 2016. He is introduced as a new social worker to help care for Ashley Thomas (John Middleton), who is suffering from vascular dementia. Gerrard previously appeared in the soap in 2012, as guest character Luke. Will proved to be popular with viewers, who deemed him very attractive.

Laurel Thomas (Charlotte Bellamy) hires Will to care for her husband Ashley, who is suffering from dementia. Laurel tells Will that she is struggling to look after Ashley, as she also has a young son and a baby to care for. Will assures Laurel that he is there to help her. Will plays the guitar with Ashley, and gives him and Laurel some time alone together. He tells Ashley's daughter Gabby Thomas (Rosie Bentham) that Ashley's condition is worsening, and she promises to tell Laurel. After Ashley dies, Will attends his funeral.

== Other characters ==
Date(s)	Character	Actor	Circumstances
18 January	Davenport	Simon Ludders	Davenport comes to an open day at The Woolpack, following Diane Sugden's (Elizabeth Estensen) decision to sell her half of the pub. Diane shows Davenport around, but when he asks to see the cellar where Cameron Murray (Dominic Power) died, Diane gets him to leave.
19 January – 4 February	Duncan	Richard Southgate	Duncan is a wine rep, who delivers too many boxes of wine to David Metcalfe's (Matthew Wolfenden) shop. He later finds them being sold at a wine tasting night. Duncan agrees not to report the incident in exchange for a date with Tracy Shankley (Amy Walsh). Duncan and Tracy have lunch at The Grange, but when she refuses to have sex with him, he goes to The Woolpack and asks Carly Hope (Gemma Atkinson) on a date. Finn Barton (Joe Gill) realises Duncan is married and tells Carly and Tracy, who get their revenge by stealing some cases of wine from his van.
19 January	PC Emerson	Laura Howard	PC Emerson comes to the village to question Rakesh (Pasha Bocarie) and Kirin Kotecha (Adam Fielding) when Kirin reports Rakesh for faking the DNA test.
16 March–11 May	Defence Barrister	Andrew Readman	Defence Barrister and Prosecution Barrister was present during Gordon Livesy's (Gary Mavers) plea hearing in March 2016. Gordon pleaded not guilty to the historic charges of sexually abusing his son Aaron Livesy (Danny Miller) whilst he was growing up. They were both the prosecution for the trial.
16 March–11 May	Prosecution Barrister	Mandana Jones	Defence Barrister and Prosecution Barrister was present during Gordon Livesy's (Gary Mavers) plea hearing in March 2016. Gordon pleaded not guilty to the historic charges of sexually abusing his son Aaron Livesy (Danny Miller) whilst he was growing up. They were both the prosecution for the trial.
16 March–11 May	Judge	Rosalind March	The judge presided over Gordon Livesy's (Gary Mavers) plea hearing in March 2016, after Gordon's son Aaron Livesy (Danny Miller) accused him of historic sexual abuse. Gordon pleaded 'Not Guilty', so the judge released him on bail until his trial. During the hearing, the judge had to warn Aaron's mother, Chas Dingle (Lucy Pargeter) numerous times about shouting from the gallery and she eventually asked security to clear the courtroom. A month later, the same judge presided over Gordon's trial.
12 – 15 April	Jury Foreman	Humphrey Casely-Hayford	Jury Foreman read out the jury's verdict at Gordon Livesy's (Gary Mavers) trial for raping his son Aaron Livesy (Danny Miller) during his childhood. The foreman told the court that the jury had found Gordon guilty on all four counts.
19 July – 12 September	Ellie	Ashlie Robinson	Ellie is a hallucinated friend of Belle Dingle from when they were both in prison. In July 2016, Belle, who was lying she was pregnant, stopped taking her medication, and began to have hallucinations while at a spa break with Charity and Lisa Dingle. She ran away from them and into a sauna when she hallucinated that Ellie was there too. The hallucinations told Belle that Ellie was pregnant and she has to take Ellie's baby if she didn't want to lose her boyfriend Jermaine Bailey. Belle was too busy talking to hallucinated Ellie, that she didn't notice a runaway supermarket trolley. The trolley rolled down Main Street and into Belle, knocking her to the ground. Charity thought this was the prefect opportunity to fake a miscarriage, but upon Ellie's prompting Belle ran away from a sonographer at the hospital.
