= Chrissie White (Emmerdale) =

Fictional character from Emmerdale

- Emmerdale character
- Portrayed by: Louise Marwood
- Duration: 2014–2018
- First appearance: Episode 7006; 23 October 2014
- Last appearance: Episode 8041; 11 January 2018
- Introduced by: Kate Oates
In-universe information
- Other names: Chrissie Sugden
- Occupation: Businesswoman; Beautician
- Family: Sugden
- Father: John Richards
- Mother: Ellen White
- Adoptive father: Lawrence White
- Stepmother: Bernice Blackstock
- Half-sisters: Rebecca White
- Husband: Robert Sugden (2015–2016)
- Sons: Lachlan White
- Uncles: Tim Richards
- Nephews: Sebastian White

Chrissie White (previously Sugden) is a fictional character from the British ITV soap opera Emmerdale, played by Louise Marwood. She made her first screen appearance on 23 October 2014. The character and casting was announced on 4 October 2014. The character was the fiancé of established character Robert Sugden (Ryan Hawley), who announced the character to return to the series after five years. Her storylines have included: her turbulent relationship and later marriage to Robert; being caught up in a raid at Home Farm organised by Robert; defending her teenage son Lachlan (Thomas Atkinson) when it is revealed that he sexually assaulted Alicia Metcalfe (Natalie Anderson); discovering that Robert has been having an affair with Aaron Livesy (Danny Miller); accidentally causing a helicopter crash which killed multiple residents; discovering that Lawrence (John Bowe) is not her biological father; embarking on a relationship with Robert's adoptive brother Andy Sugden (Kelvin Fletcher), which ended with Chrissie fitting up and destroying Andy for Lawrence's attempted murder when Lachlan shoots him after discovering that Andy had cheated on her; and her intense feud with her younger sister Rebecca (Emily Head). Chrissie was killed-off, alongside Lawrence, in a previously unannounced departure on 11 January 2018, after being involved in a car accident involving the entire White family caused by Lachlan.

== Casting ==
On 4 October 2014, Emmerdale announced the arrival of a new family who would be taking over Home Farm. With former Coronation Street actor John Bowe having already made his first appearance on-screen as Lawrence White, with Louise Marwood being cast as Lawrence's daughter Chrissie who is also the fiancé of already established character Robert Sugden now played by Ryan Hawley and Thomas Atkinson being cast as Chrissie's 14-year-old son Lachlan. Series producer Kate Oates commented: "Home Farm has always been the seat of power in Emmerdale. In Lawrence, we have a family man with serious status and a complex history. Robert's going to have to prove himself worthy - not just of the big house on the hill, but of Lawrence's daughter Chrissie. But will the ghosts of his past hold him back?"

== Development ==
In an interview with Digital Spy in October 2014, Marwood revealed that Chrissie would not feel threatened by Robert's ex-girlfriend Katie Addyman (Sammy Winward). Discussing Chrissie's reaction, Marwood said: "I think Chrissie is a very confident person and she is confident in her relationship as well. Obviously there's always going to be something where exes are concerned, but I think Chrissie finds it quite amusing as well. She's not threatened by Katie. Chrissie has obviously grown up with wealth and with that comes her confidence. She's very hard-working, as she's gone out and made her own wealth on top of the money that her family have got. Chrissie is also a good person, so she's not an archetypal character who's coming in - she's very complex."

Revealing what viewers can expect from the White family, Marwood said: "They come in as a different dynamic which is going to shake things up in the village. Chrissie is a single mum and she had Lachlan when she was quite young, so she's got this weak spot with him. Lachlan means more to her than anyone else in the world, but he is her weakness because she has slightly overindulged him. Lachlan is slightly troubled so she's trying to deal with that. There's the question of how to deal with that person you love more than anyone in the world when you know there's something that's not quite right, or they're behaving in a way that isn't right. On top of that, Chrissie is older than Robert and she's got all of his troubles and past history to deal with. They're planning their wedding, so there's a lot on her plate when she comes in. She's also a businesswoman and she keeps that going. There's loads of things going on, and there is scope for relationships with people in the village and female friends for Chrissie. I think people are also slightly in awe of her in the beginning, just because of the way that she comes in."

Discussing his plans for Chrissie, Emmerdale producer Iain MacLeod said: "Andy is going to break her heart in spectacular fashion. What we're going to do with Chrissie after that point is to transition her into a slightly different chapter of her life. She has been destroyed by Robert and just about managed to trust again with Andy and let him put her heart back together again but he’s smashed that as well and something in Chrissie snaps. We are going to see a sharper, funnier, bitchier, harder, much more kind of classic queen bee soap bitch character evolving over the summer. We're excited about it – the idea came to us when Louise came in with her new bob and we loved it and thought “she looks like a killer bitch” so essentially it's the first ever soap storyline that's been inspired by a haircut! No, I’m joking of course, it’s going to be a fantastic new direction for Chrissie and the Whites more generally."

In an interview with the Metro in July 2016, Marwood was asked how she felt about Chrissie recently becoming a "soap bitch" and the change in character, Marwood responded: "I think it's going to be fun actually, because last year there was a lot of Chrissie being a victim. For pretty much the whole year it was one thing after another. So this was quite empowering to turn it around a bit and there's just one tiny little thing too far that's sent her over the edge. I mean, it's a build-up of everything that's happened to her with the men in her life and then she sort of turns. And she really turns as well, which is good. It's fun". Asked if she took inspiration from other Emmerdale bitches like Charity Dingle (Emma Atkins) and Kim Tate (Claire King), Marwood replied: "No but they're pitching me against Charity a bit, so I think we might have [that] at some point. I think that’s still happening, where they're vying for queen bee in the village. I think that’s still going to happen, which will be fun because she's brilliant. It doesn't end well for any of them though, does it? I think what they're trying to do again is separate Home Farm from the village because we've sort of been on par with everyone and the way that Emmerdale used to be is that there was very much the ladies and lords of the manor and the rest of the village. So they're trying to bring that back in through this. They're trying to separate us by any means necessary I think. Marwood described Chrissie becoming a "soap bitch" as "empowering".

== Storylines ==
Chrissie moves into Home Farm with her father Lawrence (John Bowe) and teenage son Lachlan (Thomas Atkinson). Upon her arrival, she realises her fiancé Robert Sugden (Ryan Hawley) previously had a life in Emmerdale and has unfinished business with his family. She becomes relieved when her father Lawrence and Robert manage to get along, after Lawrence had an angina attack when Home Farm was robbed, which Chrissie and Robert were also caught up in. Chrissie begins making wedding plans and becomes unhappy when her half-sister Rebecca (Emily Head) is unable to book a flight in time for the wedding.

Chrissie befriends David (Matthew Wolfenden) and Alicia Metcalfe (Natalie Anderson), grateful that Alicia is taking an interest in Lachlan as he has made friends with her son, Jacob (Joe-Warren Plant). She even suggests that they invest in David's shop, which David agrees to. Sadly, Lachlan's interest in Alicia becomes unhealthy and leads to Lachlan sexually assaulting her. Chrissie initially believes Lachlan's version of events but, on finding a violent pornographic video on his laptop and his past history, later realises that Alicia is telling the truth. She then calls the police herself, insisting to Lachlan and Lawrence that Lachlan must take responsibility for his actions.

Chrissie later discovers that Robert organised the robbery at Home Farm, so locks him in a barn and threatens to set fire to it. After pouring petrol everywhere, it is revealed only to be water as she wanted to scare him like he frightened her and Lawrence. Chrissie shares a passionate kiss with Cain Dingle (Jeff Hordley) at the garage, which Harriet Finch (Katherine Dow Blyton) photographs after being hired by Robert to spy on Cain. Robert continually blackmails Cain with the photographs, and expresses his disgust towards Chrissie, revealing to Lawrence what she has done with Cain. Eventually, Cain kidnaps Robert and tortures him until he agrees to get rid of the photographs. However, Cain's wife, Moira (Natalie J. Robb), finds out and hits Chrissie in front of Cain and Robert for kissing her husband.

After discovering that Robert has been having an affair with Aaron Livesy (Danny Miller), Chrissie throws him out. She repeatedly attempts to get Robert to sign divorce papers but he refuses. In a fit of grief, Chrissie snaps; she pours petrol over Robert's car and eventually commits arson by setting fire to it. Robert eventually puts out the flames with an extinguisher, but are soon reignited when they touch some nearby gas canisters placed near a car that Adam Barton (Adam Thomas) is sleeping in. They explode, sending a can flying into the air and hitting a helicopter that is flying above, which was the one that Pete Barton (Anthony Quinlan) had booked as a surprise for his new wife Debbie Dingle (Charley Webb) to have a romantic getaway in. The helicopter crashes into the village hall, leaving several villagers' lives on the line, eventually resulting in the deaths of Ruby Haswell (Alicya Eyo) and Val Pollard (Charlie Hardwick). Chrissie is left devastated over the whole situation and informs the mourners and the police of her guilt. She then goes to stay with Rebecca.

Chrissie returns some weeks later and pleads guilty to arson. However, she pleads not guilty to reckless arson. Val's furious husband Eric (Chris Chittell) is desperate for justice and holds Chrissie hostage in Home Farm with a cricket bat. Robert later arrives and convinces Eric to leave. Chrissie is later arrested for the attempted murder of Robert after he is shot, however she is not charged and Lawrence tells the police it was he who shot Robert to protect Chrissie. She later develops feelings for her solicitor Rakesh Kotecha (Pasha Bocarie) as he helps her when she and Lawrence are arrested for shooting Robert. Chrissie makes a pass at him, but he rejects her advances due to his engagement to Priya Sharma (Fiona Wade).

Chrissie is happy to hear that Lawrence and Bernice Blackstock (Samantha Giles) are engaged. However, on the night before the wedding, Chrissie sees Bernice kissing her ex, Andy Sugden (Kelvin Fletcher). Chrissie tells Lawrence but he marries Bernice anyway, much to Chrissie's disgust. When Chrissie stands trial for the helicopter crash, she is convinced that Robert is going to testify against her and is surprised when he defends her. Chrissie is relieved to be found not guilty and she receives a suspended sentence. Eric is appalled at this and throws a paintball at her in the courtroom, leading to his arrest. After Priya ends her relationship with Rakesh, he gets drunk and tries to kiss Chrissie. However, she rejects his advances. Chrissie then begins a serious relationship with Andy. Chrissie is convinced that Bernice is cheating on Lawrence, but is shocked to discover that Lawrence gave Bernice permission. She is even more shocked to discover that he had the same arrangements with her mother. Chrissie then begins to doubt her true paternity and Lawrence confirms her suspicions by telling her that he is not her biological father.

Chrissie finds a love letter in her mother's belongings from a man named Ronnie Hale (John McArdle), and becomes convinced that he is her father. However, she is unaware that the love letter is actually to Lawrence and that Lawrence and Ronnie were having an affair while Lawrence was married to her mother. In July 2016, Chrissie discovers the truth about Lawrence and Ronnie, and reveals this in The Woolpack. As a result, Lawrence throws Chrissie and Lachlan out of Home Farm. Lachlan then shoots Lawrence during a confrontation, however Chrissie sees this as an opportunity to frame Andy after discovering that he has cheated on her with Bernice. After planting incriminating evidence of the shooting in Andy's belongings, chrissie put andy on the path of destruction by having him destroyed, arrested and charged with attempting to murder Lawrence. In August 2016, Andy stands trial for the shooting, and is still unaware that Chrissie has framed him. Upon discovering that Rakesh started the fire that nearly killed Ronnie and Nicola King (Nicola Wheeler), Chrissie blackmails him to have Andy sent to prison for good. Rakesh then helps Andy to escape court; Andy returns to the village to confront Chrissie. She admits that she framed him and put him on the path of destruction, but then phones the police. As the police arrive, Chrissie slits her wrist, gives Andy the knife and shouts for help in order to frame him for trying to kill her. Andy is forced to flee the village under a new identity, with the help of Robert, who vows to get revenge on Chrissie.

Not long after, Rebecca arrives in Emmerdale; however, the Whites are unaware that Rebecca is working with Robert to expose Chrissie and Lachlan. After tricking Lachlan, Rebecca finds the last remaining evidence of the shooting; however, Chrissie finds out and a scuffles ensues, resulting in Rebecca's falling and hitting her head, knocking her unconscious. Chrissie and Lachlan then flee the scene, believing that Rebecca is dead. However, she turns up at the bonfire party, and reveals to the entire village that Lachlan shot Lawrence and Chrissie framed Andy. Diane is furious and wants revenge on the Whites, slapping Lachlan and throwing a brick through their window. Diane later threatens Chrissie with Lawrence's shotgun, desperate for her to understand how she feels. Chrissie then reveals to Diane that she believes that Lachlan shot Lawrence on purpose, unaware that Lachlan has videoed the entire conversation. Lachlan then hands himself in to the police, devastating Chrissie, and Lawrence is appalled to hear Rebecca manipulating Chrissie into telling the police that she shot him. Chrissie and Rebecca's feud subsequently intensifies, and when Lawrence gives Chrissie their mother's wedding ring, she withholds it and accuses Rebecca of stealing it. When this is revealed, a scuffle on the staircase results in Chrissie's falling over the bannister and through a glass table, leaving her unconscious and bleeding. When at hospital, Chrissie tells Rebecca that she will inform the police that Rebecca intended to murder her; however, Lawrence discovers this and reveals his shame towards Chrissie. She then decides against it, and Lawrence forces them to reconcile.

Rebecca later falls pregnant by Robert and decides to keep the baby, which Chrissie supports. Chrissie later discovers that her biological father is a man named John Richards, who was in love with her mother however Lawrence framed him for a crime that he did not commit, which led to John committing suicide. Tim Richards (Mark Moraghan) later arrives in Emmerdale and Chrissie develops feelings for him, unaware that Tim is actually John's brother and Chrissie's biological uncle. Tim later flees after being kidnapped and threatened by Lawrence, Lachlan and Robert. Rebecca gives birth to a baby boy, whom she names Sebastian. Lachlan later goes missing, much to Chrissie's despair, however everyone is unaware that Lachlan is actually hiding in the attic and faking his disappearance to gain sympathy and until the Whites see Robert for what he is. It later transpires that Robert has been manipulating the Whites, and following the revelation, Lachlan comes home. The Whites then decide to leave for Australia in order for Rebecca to leave the country with Sebastian without Robert knowing, however Lachlan is adamant he wants to stay after beginning a relationship with Belle Dingle (Eden Taylor-Draper).

Chrissie visits Belle to reveal that Lachlan faked his disappearance, and convinces her to end the relationship so that he leaves to Australia with the rest of his family. Belle does so, however lets slip that she has spoken to Chrissie. Elsewhere, Robert snatches Sebastian from the Whites after hiring a private investigator, who learns of the family's plans to flee the country. A car chase then ensues, and Lachlan confronts Chrissie over never allowing him to be happy. Lachlan then grabs the wheel, sending the car into the path of an oncoming lorry; the vehicle is overturned and rolls into a nearby field. Lawrence is killed instantly, however Lachlan regains consciousness. Rebecca is alive however remains unconscious, and Chrissie awakens while Robert calls for an ambulance. Lachlan reveals to Chrissie that Lawrence has died, and that he needs her help to resolve the situation. However, within moments and just as the ambulance arrives, Chrissie dies from her injuries, leaving Lachlan devastated.

== See also ==
- List of soap opera villains
