= Robert Sugden =

Fictional character from Emmerdale

- Emmerdale character
- Ryan Hawley as Robert Sugden (2015)
- Portrayed by: Richard Smith (1986–1989); Christopher Smith (1989–2001); Karl Davies (2001–2009); Ryan Hawley (2014–present)
- Duration: 1986–2005, 2009, 2014–2019, 2025–present
- First appearance: Episode 1042; 22 April 1986
- Introduced by: Richard Handford (1986); Anita Turner (2009); Kate Oates (2014); Iain MacLeod (2025)
- Crossover appearances: Corriedale (2026)
In-universe information
- Other names: Robert Sugden-Dingle
- Occupation: Mechanic; Barman; Chef; Estate manager; Businessman
- Family: Sugden
- Father: Jack Sugden
- Mother: Pat Sugden
- Adoptive mother: Sarah Sugden
- Stepmother: Diane Sugden
- Brothers: Jackie Merrick
- Half-brothers: Tommy Merrick; John Sugden; Andy Sugden (adoptive)
- Half-sisters: Sandie Merrick; Victoria Sugden
- Spouse: Chrissie White (2015–2016); Aaron Dingle (2018–2022); Kev Barton (2022–2026)
- Sons: Sebastian White
- Stepsons: Lachlan White; Lewis Barton
- Grandfathers: Jacob Sugden; David Harker
- Grandmothers: Annie Sugden; Dolly Harker
- Uncles: Joe Sugden; Syd Harker
- Aunts: Peggy Skilbeck; Janie Blakey
- Nephews: Harry Sugden; Jack Sugden (adoptive)
- Nieces: Sarah Sugden (adoptive)
- First cousins: Sam Skilbeck; Sally Skilbeck
- Other relatives: Sam Pearson Serena Sugden; Leyla Sugden (adoptive)

Robert Sugden is a fictional character from the British ITV soap opera Emmerdale. The character originally appeared on the show regularly between 22 April 1986 and 3 October 2005. During that time he was first played as a baby by Richard Smith between 1986 and 1989 before the role was taken over by Christopher Smith from 1989 until 2001. In 2001, Karl Davies took over the role in order for the character to become involved in more adult storylines, as he grew older. Davies briefly reprised his role as Robert for one episode, airing on 10 February 2009, when he returned for the funeral of his father and Emmerdale's longest-running character, Jack Sugden (Clive Hornby). The character returned on 23 October 2014, with actor Ryan Hawley taking over the role. Robert made his return to the show on 28 May 2025.

During his first stint, Robert has embarked on a longstanding feud with his adoptive brother Andy Sugden (Kelvin Fletcher) after discovering he started the fire that killed their mother Sarah Sugden (Alyson Spiro). Their rivalry led to the events of Robert having an affair with Andy's wife Katie Sugden (Sammy Winward), whom he later cheated on by sleeping with her rival Sadie King (Patsy Kensit), and culminated with him causing the tragic death of Max King (Charlie Kemp) after the pair tried to kill each other by running the other down in their own vehicle. Robert subsequently left the village to avoid going to prison for Max's death, but came back briefly for Jack's funeral in February 2009. The character returned to the series on 23 October 2014, and became the show's main antagonist throughout 2015. During that year, Robert had an affair with Aaron Dingle (Danny Miller), which led to the events of Robert accidentally killing Katie on the day he married Chrissie White (Louise Marwood); embarking on a feud with Aaron's mother Chas Dingle (Lucy Pargeter) and Paddy Kirk (Dominic Brunt); getting beaten up and blackmailed by Chas' brother Cain Dingle (Jeff Hordley); and being shot by Ross Barton (Michael Parr) in the "Who Shot Robert Sugden?" storyline, in the light of his affair with Aaron and role in Katie's death both being exposed.

Following his shooting, Robert became one of the show's major protagonists as his relationship with Aaron dominated the events of the series. This long-running story arc involved Robert supporting Aaron upon discovering that he was sexually abused by his father, Gordon Livesy (Gary Mavers), as a child; becoming engaged to Aaron and later surprising him with an unofficial wedding between them in 2017; bonding with Aaron's half-sister Liv Flaherty (Isobel Steele), and temporally becoming her guardian after Aaron is arrested and sentenced to 12 months in prison – which involved Robert struggling to cope with Aaron's drug use amid serving his prison sentence; their marriage having a breakdown after Robert ends up sleeping with Chrissie's sister Rebecca (Emily Head); and the pair remarrying in 2018 after Robert and Aaron manage to reunite and reconcile over their differences.

During this time, Robert's storyline with Andy and the Whites concluded with him and Andy making amends after the pair nearly killed each other in a car-game of chicken; Robert clearing Andy's name after Chrissie framed the latter for shooting her father Lawrence (John Bowe), with the culprit being her son Lachlan (Thomas Atkinson); his one-night stand with Rebecca that results in her getting pregnant and giving birth to her son Sebastian; his scheme to con the Whites in a revenge plot; kidnapping Sebastian when he found out that Rebecca and her family were planning to emigrate with Sebastian without his knowledge, which led to the events of Lachlan causing the deaths of Chrissie and Lawrence in a road collision; being held hostage by Lachlan after he and his girlfriend, Cain's half-sister Belle (Eden Taylor-Draper), discover that Lachlan had killed their friend Gerry Roberts (Shaun Thomas) and allegedly murdered his false uncle Paul Tozer (Daniel Casey) for discovering that he caused the deaths of his mother and grandmother; helping Rebecca from her trauma of being kidnapped by Lachlan for months and later allowing her to leave the village with Sebastian to start anew with Ross, her new boyfriend (also Seb's potential father as no paternity test was ever taken); and supporting his sister Victoria (Isabel Hodgins) after learning that she had been raped by car salesman Lee Posner (Kris Mochrie). In the latter storyline, Robert ends up killing Lee after hospitalising him in retaliation for denying to have perpetuated Victoria's rape ordeal – which sparks the events of the character's impending departure from the show when Robert, after being detained and later pleading guilty to Lee's attack prior to his death, goes on the run to avoid going to prison for the murder he unintentionally committed.

== Casting ==
The character of Robert Sugden was introduced as the second son of Jack (Clive Hornby) and Pat Sugden (Helen Weir). He made his first on-screen appearance on 22 April 1986 as a baby. Initially played by Richard Smith, after three years on the show the character was recast and Christopher Smith took over the role. Christopher Smith remained in the role for twelve years between 1989 and 2001, making him the longest actor to play the character. During the 1990s, he was only involved in small storylines, including Sugden's decision to not work on his father's farm and his stepmother Sarah's (Alyson Spiro) death in 2000.

In May 2001, Christopher Smith was axed from the role after twelve years. ITV announced that they were casting an older actor in the role of Robert in order to involve him in more adult storylines. The character returned in August 2001, now played by Karl Davies. In September the same year, Smith sued Yorkshire Television for unfair dismissal from the role of Robert.

== Development ==
Karl Davies's reign as Robert increased the character's popularity as well as establishing the character as a sex symbol. Much of Davies's time on Emmerdale centred upon his long-standing feud with adoptive brother Andy Sugden (Kelvin Fletcher), which was used by Emmerdale producers to compete with rival soap opera EastEnders. His popular relationships with Donna Windsor, Andy's wife Katie Sugden and Debbie Dingle, established him as a bad boy, but the storyline which saw him leave his love interest Elaine Marsden for dead in a car accident, led to him being described as "an out-and-out villain" by critics. In mid–2005 it was announced that either Robert or Andy Sugden. Max King (Charlie Kemp) would be killed in a car accident that would take place in October of that year. The decision to kill off one character came after actor Charlie Kemp quit the show and producers decided to have Karl Davies written out of the soap. The episode which took place on 2 October 2005 saw Max killed while in Andy's land rover, after he grabbed the wheel when Andy and Robert began driving towards each other at high speed after Andy thwarted Robert's plan to escape the village with Andy's daughter Sarah and Sarah's mother Debbie Dingle. The following episode saw Robert leave the serial to avoid trouble with the police.

=== Return ===
Karl Davies was asked to return to the show four years following his initial departure from the show, for one episode centred on the funeral of his on-screen father Jack Sugden, following the death of Jack's real-life portrayer Clive Hornby. Davies reprised his role as Robert on 10 February 2009, which saw him return to the village alongside grandmother Annie Brearly (Sheila Mercier), who had previously been absent from the show since 1996. Davies left the show soon after.

=== Reintroduction ===
In an interview with Digital Spy in April 2014, Davies stated that he would not rule out a return to Emmerdale. He said he would "never say never". Davies told Digital Spy, "I'm still really glad to be working and to be part of some lovely stuff, so at the moment I'm very happy but who knows in the future? I love what I do and if that means a return to Emmerdale then so be it, but at the moment that's not on the cards." Davies also said that people still recognized and remembered him from his role in Emmerdale, saying, "It's still very much in people's memories – I don't quite know how! I've almost forgotten what I did, but people still linger on that. I guess it's 'cos you're in their house every night – six nights a week [or] whatever it was at the time. People still seem to remember that character – nearly a decade later which is very strange."

In September 2014 it was confirmed that Robert would be returning, but not played by Davies; instead the role was recast to Ryan Hawley. Series producer Kate Oates said: "I'm delighted to welcome Ryan to the show. Robert is a complex character and when we were looking for someone to take over the role, Ryan had the perfect balance of charm and edge, Robert Sugden's life has moved on in many ways... but those ingrained feelings – about his father, Andy, Katie, and the village where he grew up – are sure to find an explosive outlet."

=== Sexuality and relationship with Aaron Dingle ("Robron") ===
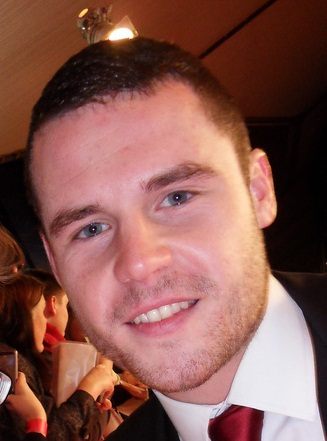
Robert was paired romantically with and eventually married Aaron Livesy played by Danny Miller (pictured).

Following Robert's return and recast in 2014, the character showed romantic interest in Aaron Livesy as played by Danny Miller and has been portrayed as bisexual. Series producer Kate Oates spoke at an Emmerdale conference saying: "Chrissie [Robert's fiancée] doesn't know about the relationship with Robert and Aaron, and that's obviously going to be a long-burner. She doesn't know that her husband-to-be has this tendency that he also fancies men, so that might be a big surprise to her!" In an interview with Digital Spy she also said: "Robert is very different from his brother in that Andy can live in the terraced house in the village with the girl that he's always loved and be happy. He works as a farmhand on the farm where he grew up, he doesn't need any more and he's a really happy guy like that. Robert always wants more – there's never enough. He's in a position now where he's with Chrissie and he's in the big house on the hill. He's also got Lawrence in his back pocket now, but it's still not enough. Robert is still taking risks and seeking adrenaline. He just wants more all the time. I think Aaron is going to be a victim of that to a certain extent, but the attraction between them is genuine."

Praising Danny Miller and Ryan Hawley, Oates continued: "What I really like is that the lads have done a great job of creating that chemistry. In the scenes where they're together, you absolutely believe it and I think that they've done brilliantly with that. It's genuine to a point, but Robert will always be out for himself!"

Oates also revealed that she spoke to Karl Davies and offered him the chance to return. When he declined the opportunity, a decision was made to recast the role with Hawley in the part.

In an interview in December 2015, Danny Miller commented that the "power of Twitter" would keep the "Robron" storyline going. Paying tribute to Ryan Hawley, Miller said: "I'm very proud to work with him. He's been here a year now and he's been amazing. He's a good lad. I say too much about him, actually – I think people think I fancy him! But he's great – he's really good, and I think they know that. They've shelved the storyline for now, but I think they're quite keen to see it again."

=== Engagement ===
In May 2016, new Emmerdale producer Iain MacLeod reveals Robert will heavily involves the big October storyline along with Aaron. Aaron and Robert will caught in explosive and heart-stopping twist. Iain says 'It's a massive, big storyline for Robron. It's funny, romantic and heartstopping in places. People will be on the edge of their seat – or possibly falling off the end of it. I think viewers want us to keep them together and they have earned the right to be together for a period. Obviously there will be challenges but I'm really rooting for them, I hope that they can make it through!’ The crash storyline also saw the characters of Robert and Aaron get engaged.

Following Robert and Aaron's engagement in October 2016, producer Iain MacLeod was asked at a press conference if the wedding would be a "big event", he responded: "In keeping with their characters, I don't think anybody is expecting dancing girls and show tunes. It's quite raw and honest, and it has got a healthy dose of Dingle craziness at the heart of it that threatens to derail things. It is huge emotional territory, but it's not dancing girls and 'Dancing Queen'. It is kind of more Robert and Aaron than that, which I hope people will like. It's happening next year." Danny Miller, who plays Aaron, was also present at the press conference – so this was all news to him, as he hasn't read the wedding script at the time. Danny said: "I was just listening in! I haven't read anything myself yet. Like Iain said, it's next year. We only really get scripts about two or three weeks before we record them, so I've not read anything yet. I think Iain's right that it would be against the characters if it was too big, or a stereotypical big pink wedding. I think it's nice that they keep it to more of a Dingle-type celebration, I guess."

MacLeod was also quizzed on what he makes of the Robron craze, which began when his predecessor Kate Oates decided to put the pair together in 2014. MacLeod said: "I have never seen anything like it, to be honest. It is a phenomenon – the Robron phenomenon. I was aware of it before I came to Emmerdale and you think you understand it. But it's only when you are immersed in it you realise how passionately our audience care about those two characters. They have been through so much and survived it, so the audience are rooting for them and so am I fundamentally. I should also say a quick word on the Robron episode you watched this week. The writer Maxine Alderton, one of our very many talented writers, is a huge Robron fan. She has got Robron dolls and stickers on her laptop, so there was never any doubt about who would write that particular episode as she is a massive superfan.

== Storylines ==
=== 1986–2009 ===
Robert Sugden was born on 22 April 1986 to Jack (Clive Hornby) and Pat Sugden (Helen Weir). He is their youngest child and has three older siblings, a brother Jackie (Ian Sharrock), a half-sister Sandie Merrick (Jane Hutcheson) and a half-brother Tommy Merrick. When Robert was four months old, his mother was killed in a car crash and his brother, Jackie, was killed in a shooting accident when he was three. Sandie also leaves the village for Scotland, and Robert loses contact with his maternal family. After Pat's death, Robert stays with his father who brings him up alone for the next two years but gets a new mother figure in Sarah Connolly (Madeleine Howard), whom Jack starts dating in 1988 and later marries in May 1994. Robert's half-sister, Victoria (Jessica Haywood), is born the same year.

When Jack and Sarah start having marriage problems after Sarah gets a new job and Jack wrongly believes she is having an affair with her boss Professor Andrew McKinnon (Michael J. Jackson), causing major rows between the couple, Robert feels neglected and runs away from home. He befriends Derek Simpson (Garry Cooper) a former soldier who lives alone and Derek allows Robert to stay with him. Eventually, Robert returns home and Jack and Sarah both promise him things will be better from then on.

In 1996, Robert befriends Andy Hopwood (Kelvin Fletcher), a boy the same age in the care of the local authority whilst his father Billy (David Crellin) is in prison for robbery and manslaughter. Robert takes Andy to a local quarry where Andy traps his foot under a rock. Robert runs to get help and Biff Fowler (Stuart Wade) rescues Andy. When Andy's grandmother (Beatrice Kelly) dies, Jack and Sarah (now Alyson Spiro) foster him so he moves in with the Sugdens. Andy and Robert take Donna Windsor (Verity Rushworth) joyriding in Leeds, causing a feud between the Sugdens and Windsors. After a while, Robert begins to resent Andy's presence and is unhappy at having to share his home and belongings. Despite this, Robert defends Andy when he is bullied by Donna and punches her. Donna's friend Chelsea Campbell (Elizabeth Ingram), who had been encouraging her to bully Andy, convinces her to get revenge on Robert and gets Donna to help her beat Robert up in the school playground. Chelsea is expelled from school and Donna is temporarily suspended and warned it will be permanent if she does it again. She makes amends with both Robert and Andy after this.

In 1997, Robert's life is rocked when he discovers that his father is having an affair with Rachel Hughes (Glenda McKay). Robert catches Jack and Rachel kissing. When the affair is discovered, Jack and Sarah stay together for the sake of the children.

In 2000, Jack grows disappointed in Robert as he doesn't want to work on the farm and shows an interest in computers. During an argument over this and Andy's adoption, Jack hits Robert. The same year, Sarah has an affair with Richie Carter (Glenn Lamont), and leaves Jack for Richie, taking Victoria with her. Robert sides with Sarah over his father but Jack wins custody of him, as Sarah is not his biological mother. Robert stays with Kathy Glover (Malandra Burrows) and tells her that he intends to leave home when he is sixteen. On 16 November 2000, Robert returns to the farm to collect some belongings and discovers the barn is on fire. Sarah is inside and subsequently dies. Jack is arrested and stands trial for Sarah's murder and is acquitted. Robert discovers that Andy started the fire and disgusted by this, he goes to Spain in May 2001 to stay with his grandmother Annie Brearly (Sheila Mercier), and her husband Amos (Ronald Magill).

Robert (now Karl Davies), returns in August 2001. Wanting rid of Andy, Robert starts taunting him about his love life. He tries to cause problems between Andy and his girlfriend Katie Addyman (Sammy Winward) but is unsuccessful. In September 2001, Robert and Andy go on a night out in Leeds with Katie, Donna, Ollie (Vicky Binns) and Marc Reynolds (Anthony Lewis), and Eve Birch (Raine Davison). When Andy is refused entry to a nightclub, the teenagers miss their bus home and Andy steals a car to drive home. On their way back, they run over and kill their headmistress Barbara Strickland (Alex Hall). Robert suggests they cover their tracks and subsequently burn the car. The truth eventually comes out, Marc is jailed and the other teenagers receive community service.

After Andy taunts him over not having a girlfriend, Robert loses his virginity to Nicola Blackstock (Nicola Wheeler), a 24-year-old woman, a few months after his sixteenth birthday. Nicola dumps him the following day when she invites him round to her house in order for him to discover her having sex with Syd Woolfe (Nathan Gladwell).

After leaving school, Robert gets a job working as a mechanic at Scott Windsor's (Ben Freeman) garage. After having sex with her in the back of his car, Robert starts dating Donna, who is Scott's half-sister. He also starts secretly dating Elaine Marsden (Samantha McCarthy). Donna finds out about Robert's cheating and dumps him. Robert continues his romance with Elaine, but in September 2003, he and Elaine are involved a car accident while Robert is driving. Panicking, Robert flees the scene, leaving Elaine unconscious in the car. Robert lies his way out of trouble, as Elaine has no memory of how the accident happened. She later realizes the truth when she sees bruising from the seat belt across his chest, which suggests that Robert was driving, not her as Robert told everyone. In December 2003, Elaine and her family leave the village. Robert and Donna reconcile that month. Despite this, Robert begins an affair with Katie, now Andy's fiancée. Robert and Katie are caught by Andy's half-brother, Daz Eden (Luke Tittensor), in January 2004 when he sees them kissing in the garage. Katie threatens Daz, telling him he will be put into care if he says anything. Daz tells Andy but Katie convinces him that Daz is lying and is too much for them to cope with so he is returned to foster care. Victoria (now Hannah Midgley) also catches them together. Robert swears her to secrecy and Katie threatens her so she becomes too scared to talk and uses a puppet to speak through instead.

Feeling guilty, Katie ends the affair the day before her wedding to Andy in February 2004, leaving him devastated. They resume the affair after the wedding, despite Robert's reconciliation with Donna. They intend to run away together but Robert insists they tell Andy the truth when he finds Katie's farewell note, leaving him distraught. Donna is also devastated by the revelation and feels betrayed by her boyfriend and best friend. The aftermath of the affair leads to Andy waiting in Robert's caravan with a shotgun, planning to kill them both. He accidentally shoots Jack instead, leaving him fighting for his life. Robert initially refuses to forgive Andy but when he realizes that he is responsible for the situation, they reconcile and embrace in the hospital. Jack survives the gunshot wound and sticks to the coverup story the boys told the police, but unable to see Andy unpunished for trying to do such a thing to Robert disowns him and he returns alone to Butler's Farm. Robert also continues his relationship with Katie. In early 2005, Robert proposes to Katie and she accepts, and the pair plan to marry later that year. He is seduced by Sadie King (Patsy Kensit), a woman sixteen years his senior. Robert and Sadie embark on an affair and Robert thinks he can keep it a secret. Daz sees Robert kissing Sadie and he tells Andy who confronts Robert in the garage and attacks him. He tries to force Robert to tell Katie about his affair with Sadie, but Robert insists that Andy is lying. Katie eventually learns the truth when she finds erotic text messages on Robert's phone from Sadie. Heartbroken, Katie ends the relationship and Andy comforts her, leading to them sleeping together. Despite Robert begging her to stay, Katie leaves the village the following day. Heartbroken and enraged by Andy and Katie sleeping together, Robert vows to get revenge on Andy, and helps Jimmy King (Nick Miles) and Cain Dingle (Jeff Hordley), set fire to the barn at Butler's Farm. Robert sees Jimmy and Cain beat up Andy and stops them. Daz accidentally stabs Jimmy with a pitchfork while trying to protect Andy. Robert and Cain take Jimmy away and Jimmy's brother, Max (Charlie Kemp), patches him up at the vets. The truth soon emerges and Jack throws Robert out, disowns him and calls him a traitor. Robert and Andy's feud is reignited by this and Robert starts dating Debbie Dingle (Charley Webb), the mother of Andy's daughter, Sarah (Lilly-Mae Bartley). Robert and Debbie plan to go to London, along with Max who was leaving the village after poisoning cows belonging to the Briggs family for his father, Tom (Ken Farrington). On the day they plan to leave in October 2005, Andy finds out about Robert and Debbie's plan and forces her to tell him where she is going to meet Robert, he goes there and confronts him, and they start fighting. Max is forced to separate them and Robert tells Debbie that he doesn't care about her and was only interested in her because of Sarah and wanted to hurt Andy by taking his daughter away. Debbie leaves and returns to the village, heartbroken.

Max decides not to go with Robert and asks Andy to drive him to the railway station. Filled with rage, Robert turns the car round and accelerates, driving straight at Andy's Land Rover. Max panics and grabs hold of the steering wheel. The Land Rover goes off the road and rolls onto its roof. Robert parks his car, gets out and rescues Andy but the Land Rover explodes before he can rescue Max. Max is killed and Jack arrives just after the accident and Robert tells him what happened. Jack calls the emergency services and tells Robert to leave. Robert gets into his car and drives away. Robert is last seen at a service station, ordering some food and tells the waitress that he intends on travelling whichever direction his car is pointing.

Four years later, Robert returns on 10 February 2009, the day of his father's funeral. Robert visits Butler's Farm, and meets Natasha Wylde (Amanda Donohoe), who is on her horse and thinks Robert is an intruder. He explains that his father's funeral is taking place and watches from a distance, and Andy sees him. Andy tries to persuade Robert to stay and run the farm, but Robert tells Andy that he doesn't belong there any more, before driving off. Robert returns to the cemetery after nightfall, and lays a rose on his Jack's grave, before leaving.

=== 2014–2019 ===
Five years later, Robert (now Ryan Hawley) returns and moves into Home Farm with his fiancée, Chrissie White (Louise Marwood) and her father Lawrence White (John Bowe). Robert learns that Donna has recently died and he is reunited with Victoria (now Isabel Hodgins) and their former stepmother Diane (Elizabeth Estensen) at The Woolpack. Robert gets into an argument with Andy, who has recently reunited with Katie (who had returned to the village during Robert's absence), and Andy punches him when he insults her. Lawrence doesn't like Robert and wants him out of Chrissie's life. When Robert learns Lawrence had an affair with Edna Birch's (Shirley Stelfox) husband, he tells Victoria, Finn Barton (Joe Gill), Val (Charlie Hardwick) and Eric Pollard (Chris Chittell). Chrissie's son Lachlan (Thomas Atkinson) soon moves into Home Farm. Robert catches Aaron Livesy (Danny Miller) and Ross Barton (Michael Parr) with his stolen car and he blackmails them into robbing Home Farm, in order to teach Lawrence a lesson. Ross knocks Lawrence unconscious but Chrissie comes home unexpectedly, Ross and Aaron threaten her. Robert feels guilty when Chrissie discovers that her mother's ring was stolen and Aaron helps get it back. Robert is surprised to discover that Aaron is gay. He calls him to say his car has broken down and kisses Aaron, before pulling away and driving off. They later have sex in a car at the garage.

Robert is jealous of Andy and Katie and they get into a fight during Andy's stag night. Robert says that he is glad Jack is dead and that with him gone he will stay in the village as long as he wants. He also taunts Andy about his and Katie's affair. Victoria and Finn break up the fight. Andy warns Robert to stay away from the wedding. Andy and Robert eventually put their differences aside as Andy and Katie remarry. Robert begins an affair with Aaron, while Katie realises Robert is cheating on Chrissie. Aaron betrays Robert to Katie when Robert insists on going ahead with his marriage to Chrissie. Katie takes a photograph of Aaron and Robert kissing and threatens to tell everyone. Robert and Katie argue and he pushes her away. The floor collapses and she falls through to the basement, breaking her neck. Robert deletes the photo from her phone. Robert then calls Aaron and says the floor collapsed and Katie died. Aaron sends Robert to marry Chrissie and cleans up, leaving Katie lying dead at Wylie's Farm. Robert and Chrissie marry. Andy finds Katie's body, Robert invites Andy to stay with him and Chrissie.

Robert becomes overprotective of Victoria and disapproves of her fiancé Adam Barton (Adam Thomas). Chrissie breaks up with Robert after learning about his role in the robbery. Chrissie locks him in a shed and pours what Robert thinks is petrol over it. She uses her cigarette lighter to scare Robert and then throws it into the liquid, with Lachlan looking on. Robert thinks he will die the same way as his mother but is relieved when nothing happens. Robert asks Aaron to run away with him to Manchester, but Aaron refuses. Lachlan convinces Robert to let Chrissie believe that Lachlan will kill himself, making her think it's because he believes it's his fault they're breaking up. Chrissie then takes Robert back. Robert becomes furious when Victoria elopes with Adam, he worries that Victoria would miss her court case after running over Ashley Thomas (John Middleton) in her car. When Robert gets Harriet Finch (Katherine Dow Blyton) to follow Cain, believing he knows where they are, she takes a photo of Cain and Chrissie kissing. Robert later blackmails Cain to find out where Victoria and Adam are. He finds out they're getting married and attempts to stop the wedding. When he gets to where Cain said they'd be, Cain punches him in the face and puts him in the boot of his car. Robert's later beaten by Cain until Aaron saves him. Aaron later tells Cain about the affair – Cain, in turn, blackmails Robert with the information.

Paddy Kirk (Dominic Brunt), after finding Robert and Aaron in the portacabin together after they had sex, sends Chrissie a note saying to "Rein your cheating husband in." Later Robert gets drunk and turns on a grain machine and buries Paddy in grain. He goes back and turns it off when he realises that Paddy might die. He hears Andy when attempting to save Paddy and flees, leaving Andy to deal with the situation. As Paddy lies in the hospital, Robert then threatens to harm his son Leo if Paddy says anything. Later, Paddy tells Aaron that Robert tried to kill him which leads to Aaron booking a cabin for him and Robert to try and trick him into confessing about Paddy and Katie on tape. His plan doesn't work and Robert is soon holding a bound and gagged Aaron at gunpoint after knocking him unconscious with a glass vase. Robert struggles to kill Aaron, and as he's about to pull the trigger, Paddy bursts into the cabin and Robert shoots him in the arm. Robert sews up Paddy's arm after being convinced to do so by both Aaron and Paddy. He releases both of them.

A few hours later, a furious Aaron reveals all to Chrissie about his affair with Robert and she throws Robert out of Home Farm. The next day, Chrissie tells the entire pub about Robert and Aaron's affair. Robert, not wanting him to find out by someone else, tells Andy why Chrissie is so angry and he throws Robert out saying that he wishes he had killed him years ago when he had the chance. With nowhere else to go Robert stays at Val and Eric's B&B. In the following weeks, at the scrapyard, Chrissie desperately tries to get Robert to sign the divorce papers and to sign everything over to her and Lawrence. Robert refuses, so Chrissie pours petrol over his car and burns it. Once Robert thinks the flames are out, they leave arguing, while the fire spreads to a nearby car where Adam sleeps and some gas canisters, causing an explosion and helicopter crash. Robert saves Adam from the flames before they and Chrissie are sent flying when the car explodes. Diane's sister, Val, is killed in the house of mirrors. Robert and Lawrence are desperate for Chrissie not to tell anybody about her involvement in the incident. She ignores them and reveals to everybody what she has done in The Woolpack. Eric is furious and orders Chrissie to leave the village, so she leaves to stay with her sister, Rebecca. While she is away Robert organizes for a man named Connor to turn up at Home Farm badly beaten, leading to Lawrence cleaning him up. Connor calls the police lying that Lawrence assaulted him, leading to Lawrence being in trouble with the police.

Robert is shot and placed in a coma. There are numerous suspects. When Robert wakes up, he is told that Aaron shot him. Robert struggles to believe it and accuses Andy and Chrissie of shooting him and framing Aaron. Robert attends Aaron's plea hearing and he goads Aaron to tell the truth, only for Aaron to lash out and say he should have done everyone a favour and died. Robert is left a voicemail by Ashley, who calls him instead of Andy, saying that he wants to know what deal Andy had made and why he cannot let an innocent man go down. Robert confronts Andy, who admits to being involved in his shooting. Robert and Andy drive their cars at each other, only Robert swerves leading both of them to crash. Robert saves Andy from his burning car and they call a truce. Robert calls the police and gives them a false description of his shooter to free Aaron. Once Aaron is released from prison he tells Robert that he hates him.

On New Year's Eve Robert finds out Ross shot him as a result of his deal with Andy. Robert vengefully confronts Ross with a gun until Debbie and Andy walk in. Robert tells Debbie what Ross did and she moves the next day with the kids, leaving Andy and Ross devastated. Andy angrily confronts Robert, telling him he wins again. Robert, who had only wanted to get revenge on Ross, didn't think Andy would lose his kids as a result and feels guilty.

In January 2016 Robert learns Aaron is running away due to his parents', Gordon (Gary Mavers) and Chas, reconciliation, Aaron collapses in Robert's arms and Robert takes him to hospital. Aaron has sepsis from an infection in his self-inflicted wounds. Aaron admits he is self-harming because of his father. He leaves the hospital and Robert finds him hiding in Debbie's house. Robert is shocked when Aaron reveals that Gordon raped him as a child. When Robert comes face-to-face with Gordon he tells Gordon he knows what he did to Aaron and threatens him.

Robert worries for Aaron after learning Chas has kicked him out. He tells Chas that Aaron has been cutting himself because of Gordon but refuses to tell her what Gordon did to Aaron. Later Robert finds out Aaron finally told Chas about his rape. Aaron goes to the police and takes time away from the village to get his head together, Robert helps out at the scrapyard to support him. Chas enlists Robert's help to speed things up but grows impatient and vandalises Gordon's car by spraying "Paedo" on it. Robert explains that this isn't helping and takes her home. Robert tracks down Aaron's stepmother Sandra Livesy (Joanne Mitchell) who has changed her name to Flaherty. He and Aaron go to see if she can help. Arriving there Aaron needs some time to pluck up the courage to say what he needs to so he and Robert take a walk which leads to them reconnecting, but they agree to take things slow. A young thief tries to make off with Aaron's wallet and Robert gives chase earning him a knee to the groin. They later learn that the thief is Aaron's half-sister Liv Flaherty (Isobel Steele). Aaron pleads with Sandra to help him and, after initially feigning ignorance, Aaron works out that she knew about the abuse the whole time. He grows angry with his former stepmother but she still refuses to help him. Back at the Woolpack Aaron is fearful that he has ruined his chances of convicting his father. The police inform Aaron that another male victim has come forward. It is revealed that Robert is paying Gordon's neighbour Ryan (George Sampson) to lie that Gordon abused him as well. After Gordon accuses Chas of paying Ryan, Robert confesses to Chas that he was the person who found Ryan to help in Aaron's case. Two days later Ryan arrives at the pub. Aaron sees Robert talking to Ryan and asks who he is. Robert is forced to admit Ryan is the second 'victim'. Robert tries to explain to Aaron that he did it for him to get justice but Aaron leaves upset and furious. Aaron tells him if the case falls apart he will blame it on him.

Robert goes to Gordon's plea hearing to support Aaron. When Gordon turns up he pretends to be still suffering the side-effects of his treatment and then collapses with Aaron, Robert, Lisa, Belle and Chas witnessing in disbelief. Later Robert meets Aaron on the bridge, further reassuring Aaron and then hugging him, unaware of Liv watching them.

Liv comes to stay with Aaron for a while and Robert gets suspicious when Liv questions him about the other witness. Robert arrives at the pub and tells Aaron about her questioning about Ryan, Aaron puts it down to curiosity and he brings up that Robert paid him. Robert finds out from Aaron that Liv recorded them talking about Ryan. Robert blames himself and is prepared to hand himself in to the police but Aaron tells him he doesn't want him going to prison for trying to help him. DS Wise (Neil Roberts) visits the pub. When Robert is about to confess Chas covers for him by saying that this is another one of Gordon's lies.

While this is going on Robert learns that Chrissie has begun a relationship with his brother Andy. This riles Robert but also irritates Aaron as Robert's attentions are elsewhere when he needs him the most. A week later Aaron tells Robert not to come to court so Robert goes the next day when he is taking the stand. On the stand Robert insists Aaron wouldn't lie about something of this magnitude and admits publicly to his feelings for Aaron. The next day Robert goes to court to support Aaron as Gordon and Liv take the stand. Later Robert arrives at the pub to see Aaron. When Robert is about to leave Aaron asks him to stay to have a drink. Robert admits to Aaron that he is trying to be good. Aaron wants to trust him again, Robert promises he won't let Aaron down and they kiss. The next day Gordon is found guilty of rape by the jury. At the pub Robert comforts Aaron who is worried that Gordon going to prison won't help him to forget what he did, but Robert encourages him to be happy.

Robert stays over at the Woolpack with Aaron. After the first night he stays, Chas seems elated to see him at breakfast the following morning and he and Aaron discuss taking a trip somewhere to get away from it all. He later turns up with two tickets for them to go to Barcelona for the weekend but is disheartened when they can't go due to Liv turning up, wanting to stay at the Woolpack with Aaron.

When Pete Barton (Anthony Quinlan) is released from prison, he gives Robert a letter to Aaron from Gordon. Robert burns the letter after Aaron says he wants nothing more to do with Gordon. Robert discovers Liv has skipped school to go to Gordon's sentencing and he goes to court to find her. Robert also calls Aaron, who turns up and stays to see Gordon get 18 years imprisonment. Robert panics when Gordon tells Aaron about the letter, but he quickly rushes Aaron and Liv out of the court. Later Aaron asks about the letter but Robert says Gordon was lying. Aaron discovers Robert got rid of Gordon's letter. Aaron and Liv are informed that Gordon was found dead in his prison cell. Aaron blames Robert for not giving him the letter. Robert tells Aaron that Gordon was going to commit suicide. Aaron, Chas and Cain believe Robert was involved in Gordon's death, but DS Wise informs them that Gordon hung himself. Aaron apologises to Robert, who explains that he was trying to protect him. Robert suggests Aaron visits Gordon's body in the mortuary. The next day Aaron discovers Gordon left him and Liv £250.000 each in his will. Aaron and Liv refuse to have anything to do with Gordon's money. Robert and Charity talk about Aaron's decision to walk away from Gordon's money, unaware that Aaron is listening. Aaron walks in and angrily confronts Robert, calling him manipulative and controlling. Robert tries to apologise to Aaron but Aaron refuses to listen. Aaron tells Robert that he will never change. Aaron orders him to stay away from him and his life. Robert walks off upset.

Later, after Gordon's funeral, at the pub Robert is arrested for perverting the course of justice after Liv gets Ryan to go to the police about Robert paying him. Liv admits to Aaron she tried to call off the deal but it was too late. The next day Robert returns and tells Aaron he is worried that he could face prison. Robert finds out it was Liv who reported him to the police. Robert is upset to realise Aaron already knew. He is upset that Aaron chose Liv over him.

Liv runs away thanks to some nasty texts, Robert tracks her down at the cricket pavilion. Liv explains that she tried to stop Ryan from going to the police but it was too late. Robert tells her he might go to prison but he thinks it's karma for his wrongdoings. Liv and Robert decide to put their differences aside.

Robert accidentally sees Noah Dingle (Jack Downham)'s phone messages and realises that Noah is Liv's online bully. Robert warns Noah to stop his actions and Noah agrees. It is later revealed by Liv that her bully's account had been taken down. Robert, Liv and Aaron go for a holiday together shortly after.

Ryan returns wanting money from Robert or he will report him to the police for assaulting him. Robert kidnaps Ryan and locks him in the boot of his car. The next day Robert lets Ryan go, unaware that Aaron is watching him. Robert gives Ryan money and tells him to stay away from him, Aaron and Liv. Robert tries to explain to Aaron that he was scaring off Ryan to protect them but Aaron walks off upset at Robert. The next day Liv texts Robert from Aaron's phone. Liv tricks Aaron and Robert, getting them together at The Woolpack and leaves them to themselves out. Robert tells Aaron that he matters to him and he will keep trying to change for him. Aaron asks and Robert agrees to move in with him. Aaron and Robert share a kiss while a delighted Liv overhears.

Robert finally tells Aaron that it was Ross who shot him because of his deal with Andy. Aaron is upset but Robert begs him to leave it. Later Aaron sees Andy with Chrissie and punches him. Aaron tells Chrissie that Andy got Ross to shoot Robert before he walks off. Later on Andy is framed by Chrissie for Lachlan's shooting of Lawrence and Robert plans to help him. When Andy escapes from court Robert finds him where Andy reveals the truth about Chrissie. Aaron's unimpressed when he finds out Robert knows where Andy is and tries to persuade Robert to contact the police but Robert then helps Andy leave the country. Aaron's not happy with Robert over his involvement with Andy's escape but soon warms to the idea. Aaron and Robert begin plotting against Chrissie and the Whites. Lachlan finds out Robert is behind the profile of his dad Donny and Aaron protects Robert when Lachlan goes for him. Chrissie and Lachlan argue with Aaron and Robert over the messages and Robert contacts the police. The next day Lachlan pins Robert up against the portacabin at the scrapyard and Robert reveals the truth about why Donny left. Aaron gets offered a chance to learn export trade in France and Robert's keen for them to go together. Aaron and Robert plan their holiday but are soon stopped when Liv plays up in school. Aaron kisses Robert as he leaves for France and is left looking after Liv. Robert's annoyed when he finds out Chrissie has hired Victoria to cater for the launch for her new Adventure Park. Robert attempts to sabotage Chrissie's adventure park by messing with the zip wire but the next day Robert ends up hanging upside-down as he attempts to fix his sabotage after finding out Victoria has agreed to take Chrissie's place. Robert calls Victoria to help him and tells her that Chrissie has framed Andy for shooting Lawrence.

Robert asks Chrissie's sister, Rebecca White (Emily Head) to come to the village to help him with his vendetta against Chrissie. She sends a DNA test off to prove Lawrence is not Chrissie's biological father. When the topic of marriage comes up Aaron is embarrassed when Robert jokingly dismisses the idea. After rejecting Rebecca's advances Robert confides in Victoria that he is going to propose to Aaron. Robert asks Paddy for his blessing to marry Aaron, but Paddy tells him that he's not good enough for Aaron. Rebecca meets Robert at the scrap yard to apologise for making advances towards him. Lachlan overhears their conversation and threatens to make false sexual abuse allegations against Robert. Aaron suddenly appears and shoves Lachlan's head into a barrel of water before warning him to stay away from Robert. Robert arranges to meet Aaron at a barn so he can propose. Aaron reveals he has Lachlan tied up in the boot of his car and Robert reprimands Aaron for his actions. Lachlan escapes and they are forced to give chase and stop him from falling off a cliff. Lachlan tells Aaron that Robert is sleeping with Rebecca. With Lachlan back in the boot, Robert admits to Aaron that he is bisexual and did have an affair with Rebecca before getting serious with Chrissie. Robert tells Aaron that when he was 15 he had a feelings for a male farmhand. Jack caught them together and beat Robert. They never spoke of it again and Robert admits to feeling like a disappointment to his father. Aaron tells Robert that he loves him and Robert decides to propose but realises he has left the ring in the car. While driving back to the village Aaron tells Robert that he doesn't think he will be enough for him after romancing Chrissie and Rebecca, then him. Robert angrily reveals that he was going to ask Aaron to marry him. Aaron takes his eyes off the road Robert yells for him to watch out and they crash into lake after Emma Barton pushing her husband James Barton off which he lands on Ashley's car and causing a huge car crash involving Ashley, Pierce Harris, Rhona and Paddy.

When Robert comes round he pleads with Aaron to wake up. Aaron is terrified as he realises his foot is stuck and the water levels are rapidly beginning to rise inside the car. Robert tries to keep himself and Aaron calm and makes several attempts to free him but Aaron tearfully begs Robert to go and tells him he loves him before slipping under the water. Robert screams in horror and refuses to give up, going under the water to give Aaron air before making a final attempt to free him. Adam and Victoria arrive at the scene to see Robert dragging Aaron to the surface. He desperately administers CPR and Aaron spits out water as a paramedic arrives. Robert then dives back into the lake to save Lachlan, unaware that the teen had already freed himself from the boot and is watching from a distance. Adam heads to the hospital with Aaron while Vic stays behind to wait for Robert. When Robert rises from the water again, he desperately asks Vic how Aaron is. She tells him Adam went with him to the hospital and it didn't look good. Robert suddenly sees Lachlan on the bankside and is furious that his former stepson just stood there while he risked his own life going in after him. Robert threatens Lachlan that if Aaron dies he'll come for him. Robert then heads to the hospital with Vic, needing to make sure Aaron is safe.

When they arrive Adam informs Robert that Aaron is in surgery for his liver. As they wait Vic asks Robert if Aaron said "yes" to the proposal and Robert tells her he didn't get the chance to ask properly. Chas and Liv arrive but Robert abruptly leaves to Liv's dismay. He heads back to the quarry to retrieve the ring. After Robert arrives back at hospital Chas hugs him and she is pleasantly surprised to discover that Robert planned to propose to Aaron. Robert is moved by Chas' acceptance of him and laughs as she and Liv jokingly plan the wedding. They keep vigil at Aaron's bedside and Aaron wakes and whispers to Robert "Yeah" accepting his proposal. With tears in his eyes Robert gently slips the ring onto Aaron's finger. Aaron's eyes close and the heart monitor starts beeping. Chas runs to get help and Robert and Liv watch in fear as Aaron fights for his life, but happily survives.

Robert spends the night by Aaron's bedside and is relieved when he wakes up. They discuss the aftermath of the crash, including Lachlan's escape and James' death. Aaron notices the engagement ring on his finger and asks Robert if marriage is definitely what he wants. Robert responds by tenderly touching the scars on Aaron's arm, reminding Aaron that he almost lost him once already, that he couldn't bear the thought of it happening again and he wants to be with him forever. Moved by this, Aaron asks Robert to marry him. Robert immediately agrees and they kiss. Adam and Vic drop by the hospital and Vic gives Aaron the second engagement ring. He slips it onto Robert's finger making their engagement official. Chas and Liv also visit to celebrate the good news. Later, at the pub, Robert runs into Rebecca and lets her know that Lachlan knows about their past affair. Rebecca promises to help by finding evidence against Chrissie and Lachlan to secure Andy's freedom and also offers Robert shares of her inheritance, which he accepts as he has a wedding to plan. The next day Lachlan tells Chrissie about Robert and Rebecca in front of the entire pub. Robert assures Liv that Aaron already knows. Two days later, still reeling from the bombshell of Rebecca and Robert's fling, Chrissie confronts Robert in the pub and after winding her up about Rebecca and hinting that Lawrence once had a crush on him, Robert promises he will make her life hell for what she did to Andy.

Robert and Aaron gather with the rest of the village to pay their final respects to James. During the burial Aaron takes Robert's hand for comfort. At the wake Victoria's unimpressed with Rebecca offering to buy everyone drinks to gain popularity. Robert assures her Rebecca's on their side.

Rebecca finds evidence from the shooting which was used to frame Andy and shows it to Robert. He wants to go to the police with it but she tells him she wants to do it her way. Later Robert and Aaron go to the Home Farm bonfire night where Rebecca publicly accuses Chrissie of framing Andy. Diane is horrified when she learns the truth and is angry with Robert for keeping it from her. Robert is upset that even if they can clear Andy's name, he has no way of letting him know. Rebecca arrives at the pub with an incriminating video of Lachlan which Diane hopes will be evidence enough to make Chrissie and Lachlan pay. The next day Diane and Robert wait for news from the police regarding the video footage of Lachlan. Robert voices his concerns it might not be enough but Diane reminds him that she promised Jack she would look after his children. She later goes to Home Farm and warns the Whites they won't get away with what they did to Andy. Robert is livid when Lawrence threatens to evict Diane after she stages a protest outside Home Farm. Later Rebecca comes to apologise for her father and Robert instructs her to get back her family's trust so they can carry out their revenge plan against them. Robert is left reeling when Diane is arrested for hitting Lachlan.

Robert thanks Rebecca for getting Lawrence to change his mind about evicting Diane. Aaron is jealous when he spots them together and despite Robert's protestations that his involvement with Rebecca is strictly business and purely to get Andy home, Aaron believes she has other motives and tells Robert to stay away from her. Later, at the pub, as they reminisce, Rebecca kisses Robert. He gently pushes her back and reminds her they need to stick to their plan. It's not about them – it's not even about Andy – it's about Home Farm, at which point Diane walks in with a darkened expression on her face leaving Robert worried about what she may have overheard. The next day, Robert lays flowers at his mum's grave as Aaron watches on. Diane then arrives and voices her disapproval of Robert scheming with Rebecca to get their hands on Home Farm. Robert defends his actions, saying Chrissie deserves to lose everything after what she did to Andy but Diane coldly informs her stepson that Sarah would have been heartbroken to see what he's become, leaving Robert stunned and hurt. After some coercion from Rebecca, Lachlan hands him himself into the police where he is charged with attempted murder and perverting the course of justice. Robert excitedly tells Diane the news and they hope it will finally get Andy exonerated.

Robert and Aaron prepare for Lachlan's plea hearing, discussing the possibility of finally clearing Andy's name as well as their wedding plans. Robert receives a text from Rebecca saying she needs to see him urgently. Aaron asks why they can't be done with her and Robert reminds him of their Home Farm deal and insists the extra money will be useful. Diane comes to see Robert and apologises for the comments she made about Sarah. Robert reiterates to her that even though his underhand tactics against Chrissie may not be agreeable, all he really wants is to get Andy home. Rebecca meets Robert at the pub and blackmails him into breaking Lachlan out of prison, saying she'll tell Aaron about their recent kiss if he doesn't comply. They arrive at court where Rebecca sets off the alarm, causing the building to be evacuated but before Robert can get to Lachlan. Robert gets a call from Aaron, bringing him to his senses, he abandons the plan. When Rebecca confronts him, still threatening to tell Aaron about the kiss, Robert tells her he used her and never hid his relationship with Aaron and only wants him, leaving her devastated. Back at the pub Aaron informs Robert that Lachlan pleaded guilty to perverting the course of justice. Robert is satisfied with the result and tells Aaron the deal with Rebecca is off. The next day Robert brushes Rebecca off when she comes to see him, saying they have nothing to talk about anymore. Rebecca then turns her attentions to Aaron and tells him about the kiss but is shocked when he calmly calls her bluff, saying he already knew about Robert playing her before telling her she isn't a threat and to get over herself. Humiliated, Rebecca walks off in tears. In the back room, Robert assures Aaron he was indeed playing Rebecca all along in order to help Andy and also tells him about the failed breakout attempt for Lachlan. Aaron is incredulous but Robert promises him he changed his mind because he couldn't risk losing him. Frustrated, Aaron keeps trying to leave the room but Robert passionately defends himself, reiterating what he said a month ago – being bisexual doesn't mean he will cheat and it's because he's changed out of his love for Aaron before telling him maybe he needs to change too. The next day, things are still tense between the Robert and Aaron. Charity and Chas moan about the couple's constant bickering as well as how overcrowded the pub is which prompts Liv to ask Aaron and Robert why they can't get their own place. Later that evening, Robert looks for flats for the three of them and Joanie mentions that The Mill is up for auction. Liv offers to chip in using her inheritance but Aaron flat out refuses to use Gordon's money. Robert tells Aaron that having some security is just what Liv needs and the move would be good for them all. They bring up their argument from the previous day and have an honest discussion about everything. Robert assures Aaron of his feelings for him and they kiss.

Robert agrees to help Rebecca secure a business deal in order to help Aaron get a deposit for a house and is later delighted when Aaron, after a discussion with Rebecca which leads to them setting their differences aside, decides to use the inheritance money to buy The Mill. Robert enjoys his first Christmas with Aaron, Liv and the rest of the Dingles.

With Rebecca's help, Robert plans a surprise trip to Vegas for Aaron's birthday. He meets Aaron at the pub but Chrissie attempts to ruin the mood by reminding Aaron of Robert's past infidelity and warns it will happen again. Robert tells his ex-wife she is bitter and pathetic then takes Aaron into the back room which he has decorated in the theme of Vegas and excitedly tells him about their trip. Sensing Aaron is a little shaken after Chrissie's comments, Robert assures him he loves him but is upset when Aaron lets slip that he already knew about the trip after confronting Rebecca, thinking Robert was cheating on him. Robert tells Aaron they can't keep having the same argument about trust and asks him to believe in him. Robert then tells him that in exchange for the trip to Vegas, Rebecca needs his help at Home Farm during Lawrence's absence which requires an overnight stay to negotiate a business deal. Panicking, Aaron tells Robert he booked a weekend away in Manchester for them both and offers to cancel it but Robert instantly forgoes his business deal in order to be with him.

Robert attends Lachlan's trial with Diane, Victoria and Bernice where they express their disgust at Chrissie for not admitting to framing Andy and letting her son take the fall for everything. Lachlan is acquitted of attempted murder but the judge reminds the teen that he had already pleaded guilty to perjury and is therefore remanded in custody, leaving the Whites in shock and the Sugdens delighted with the result. Following a suggestion from Charity, Robert and Aaron flip a coin and decide to have a secret wedding in Vegas. The next day, Robert is celebrating a business deal with Rebecca when Aaron bursts in. Fed up with his insecurity and jealousy, this leads to a heated argument between the pair, after which Robert tells Aaron he can't do this anymore and removes his engagement ring. Later that night, after a chat with Vic, Robert tells Aaron he doesn't want to give up on them but they are interrupted by the police who arrest Aaron for attacking Finn's love interest Kasim. Aaron is released on bail the next day and offers Robert the chance to walk away for good but Robert promises to stick by him.

Robert grows concern for Aaron as his court day approaches quickly and learns that Aaron is more worried about who will look after Liv while he is inside. Robert plans a surprise wedding for him and Aaron the day before his sentencing to give Aaron more security about their family. Robert, Chas, and the Dingles keep Aaron away from the Woolpack while they decorate it for the ceremony. Paddy expresses his disapproval when he finds out, but Robert doesn't back down and Chas convinces him to accept their marriage. Just as the wedding is about to take place, the police raid the pub with a woman claiming that Faith killed her father. The wedding is then thrown in chaos as Faith runs off and is later arrested. This causes Robert to walk off as he wanted the day to be perfect. Aaron catches up to him outside the garage (where they first had sex) with the rings and they have their own ceremony in there. At the reception, Aaron tells Robert that he is worried about going to prison and doesn't want to leave him. Robert says that when it's over they can put it behind them and move on and they hug each other.

Aaron is sentenced to a year in prison. Early on he is singled out by another prisoner, Jason, and develops a drug addiction to cope with the stress. Robert and Chas visit Aaron and are shocked at the changes. Robert is further dismayed when Aaron tells him to forget about him. Hurt over his husband's rejection, Robert gets drunk, destroys his and Aaron's home, and seeks comfort from Rebecca, telling her that he and Aaron are over. They sleep together but Robert regrets it the next morning. He tells Chas who furiously slaps him. The next time they visit Aaron, Robert nearly tells him what happened, but Chas covers for him. Aaron is released early after his appeal succeeds and Robert is excited to have him back. The two begin to repair their relationship when Robert learns that Rebecca is pregnant. He tries to keep the news from Aaron, and Rebecca's boyfriend Ross attempts to blackmail him into paying him to keep quiet about the baby, leading to a feud between the two of them. Robert admits his one night stand and Rebecca's pregnancy to Aaron. After some consternation, Aaron forgives Robert and tries to move on. Robert tries to get Rebecca to have an abortion, but she refuses. He wants nothing to do with the child but Aaron convinces him to go to an ultrasound where it is discovered that Rebecca is carrying a boy. Aaron's negative feelings about Robert, Rebecca, and the baby begin to impact him. He starts taking drugs, resumes self-harming, and even attacks Robert. Aaron later comes clean about his struggles and admits that he hates the baby. After an emotionally charged conversation, Aaron despondently ends their relationship, admitting that although he does love Robert he cannot be with him anymore. Giving Robert his ring back and telling him to go, the pair part ways. The next day, in spite of Robert attempting to show Aaron that they can still be together, Aaron admits that he doesn't want to be the needy angry person he is anymore and plans to visit Liv and his mother in Ireland to get away.

Missing Aaron, Robert tries to take over Home Farm. He gets Rebecca to bring him back into the business and impacts Lawrence's health by spiking his drinks with drugs. He even manipulates Lawrence into thinking that they have slept together, makes him believe that he murdered Tim Richards (Chrissie's biological uncle) plays on Lawrence's burgeoning feelings for him. When Aaron returns, Robert attempts to get back together but is rebuffed. After Liv learns why they broke up, she is furious at Robert and Rebecca. She confronts him over this, leading Robert to express his anger towards Rebecca and the baby and his continued love for Aaron. Liv shows up at Home Farm trying to get Robert to admit his resentment to Rebecca, but Robert harshly tells her to leave. She steals a spiked bottle of brandy and Robert's car. She passes out after drinking some of it and is taken to the hospital where Robert is forced to admit his tampering to Aaron. Aaron swears to kill Robert if Liv dies, but she survives. While she recovers, Aaron takes an interest in her doctor, Alex Mason. Liv encourages him to pursue a relationship with him and Robert gets jealous. At first, it goes nowhere, but Aaron and Alex later begin a tentative relationship to Robert's dismay.

Rebecca goes into labour and, with Robert present, delivers a baby boy named Sebastian. Robert, fearing that he will ruin his son's life, planned to leaves the village, but after Robert comes clean to Aaron about everything he did to the Whites, Aaron convinces him to stay and be a father. He agrees, and promises to be a better man and a good father. He abandons his schemes against the Whites but Rebecca discovers his lies and later reveals it all to them. Lawrence beats up Robert and Rebecca keeps him from seeing Sebastian. At Christmas, they stop Robert from giving Seb presents. Robert drowns his sorrows at the Woolpack and drunkenly attempts to persuade Aaron to take him back, humiliating himself and insulting Alex. That night, still intoxicated, he is hit by the Whites' car and is knocked unconscious. While unconscious, he has disturbing dreams where he the same day, watches Aaron's funeral, and receives advice from the ghost of Val Pollard. When Robert wakes up, he vows to become a less selfish person and encourages Alex not to give up on Aaron.

Robert continues to try and see his son, but the Whites don't believe that he is trying to change. Lachlan manipulates them into thinking that Robert has hurt him, and Rebecca forbids Robert from seeing Seb. Robert attempts to force mediation between him and Rebecca, but she and the Whites decide to flee to Australia in secret. When Robert learns of the move, he kidnaps Sebastian from his car seat. The Whites chase after him in their car, but are hit by a truck. Chrissie and Lawrence are killed and Rebecca is put in a coma. When Rebecca wakes up, she has post-traumatic amnesia and can only remember that Robert kidnapped Seb. Robert struggles with his duties as a single parent, and enlists the aid of his friends and family while Rebecca recovers.

On Valentine's Day, Robert offers to help Aaron cook a meal for his boyfriend Alex and they end up sharing an intimate moment when Aaron leans in to kiss Robert, interrupted when Alex arrives unexpectedly. Robert is hopeful and confused about whether Aaron still has feelings for him after all. On their wedding anniversary his hopes are dashed as he sees Alex moving in to live with Aaron at Mill Cottage. The following evening, to get over Aaron, he goes to a gay bar with his sister, step sister and other morally supportive ladies from Emmerdale. He reluctantly agrees to get the phone number of an Irish hiker called Mike, and while they are talking, Aaron arrives and sees them. Aaron finishes with Alex because he says he misses Robert, but Robert leaves with Mike. Aaron goes back to Emmerdale to the Woolpack. When he leaves the Woolpack, he hears noises coming from the garage and finds Robert inside with a bottle of whiskey. Robert admits he didn't go back to Mike's place after all, because even if it doesn't count anymore he still feels he wants to be faithful to Aaron. Aaron tells him he finished with Alex and that he still wants him, and the two talk over their past issues but Robert says he can't get back with Aaron because losing him was so hard he would rather not have him back than lose him again when Aaron figures out he is a terrible person after all. He goes back to Keepers Cottage, but an emotional Aaron arrives on the doorstep and lists all the reasons he knows Robert and the good things Robert has done, and he asks Robert to come home. Robert tells him he loves him so much, and they reunite and Robert goes home to Aaron.

The following day, Liv comes home and wonders why Robert is in the house leaving Robert no choice but to inform her of his and Aaron's reconciliation. He has a heart to heart with Liv admitting he never stopped caring about her. He tells her he loves her and she is his sister. The pair prank Aaron pretending that Liv isn't happy he's back. They inform Aaron that they have talked and Liv tells Aaron she is happy to have him back.

Robert tells Rebecca he is moving back home with Aaron. He informs her he will still help her, but he loves Aaron and wants to make a life with him. Robert moves back into The Mill with Aaron and Victoria's help. Aaron suggests they take Seb to give Rebecca a break.

Robert argues with Joe Tate after he keeps getting Jimmy to do work for him. He then has another row with him after he insults the Dingles, which pushes Robert to lose him a client by revealing the truth about Wishing Well. Robert accepts Joe's offer of making amends unaware of his true motive.

Victoria informs Robert and Aaron about Rebecca's strange behavior. Robert suggests they take Seb to Eliza's birthday party. After attending the party, Robert informs Victoria she was perfectly fine. Robert goes to see Rebecca who asks if she can join him and Aaron on a date. Despite feeling awkward he agrees. Later, Victoria informs Aaron and Robert that Rebecca has vanished. They arrive back at Victoria's and Robert is unhappy he and Aaron couldn't go out on a date because it seems Rebecca wasn't missing after all and had only wanted to sleep. She tells them to keep Seb for the night as they are taking him to the zoo the next day. Later, Robert discovers that Joe had Rebecca arrested and confronts him. Arriving back at Keepers Cottage Robert discovers smoke and is told by Aaron he had to break in to get Seb as he'd been left unattended with the cooker was on. Rebecca is shocked to discover it was her fault, so Aaron, Robert and Victoria encourage her to go the hospital where she's told she is suffering with executive dysfunction.

Robert and Aaron worry about Seb's safety, whilst Robert praises Aaron for saving Seb, Aaron suggests Seb comes to live with them, but Robert is unsure about taking him from Rebecca after everything she's been through. Rebecca calls Aaron and Robert round to Keepers Cottage and informs them she no longer trusts herself and tells them to take Seb. As they pack up his belongings, Rebecca says a tearful goodbye promising Seb she still loves him before handing him over to Robert.

A couple of days later Robert and Aaron arrive home at The Mill with Seb where Liv is giving Aaron the silent treatment. As they talk about Gabby, Liv confesses to her role in drugging Lisa. Robert and Aaron are shocked but decide to protect Liv insisting she keeps it quiet. In September, he was thrilled alongside Rebecca when Lachlan was sentenced to life imprisonment without parole. Shortly after, Rebecca leaves the village with Ross and Seb, prompting Robert and Aaron to begin the process of looking for a surrogate to have their own child.

In 2019, Victoria is raped by Lee, a stranger on a night out and Robert attacks him after Victoria receives harassment from Lee and his mother, leading Robert to be arrested for grievous bodily harm. This ends the surrogacy plans. Robert pleads guilty to GBH with intent. Later Lee dies from a brain haemorrhage sustained from the attack. Robert and Aaron both decide to go on the run together, but Robert hands himself in to the police for Aaron's safety. Robert is charged with Lee's murder and is sentenced to life in prison, minimum fourteen years without parole until full-time has been served.

=== 2025–present ===
Robert returns after being released from prison early, he walks into Aaron's wedding to John, Robert confirms that someone posted on social media to that is how he found out about the wedding, Robert admits he still loves Aaron and they kiss on the bridge, John and Robert get into a fight, Robert later gets arrested for breaking his bail conditions and is banged up for breaking his licence. Robert goes on a date with Owen Michaels, who spikes Robert's drink and attempts to abduct him before being thwarted by John. John drives away with the unconscious Robert in his van.

== Reception ==
Karl Davies, who was the third actor to portray Robert, received much praise from fans and critics for his portrayal of the character. Anthony D. Langford of The Backlot remarked that Cain knocking Robert to the floor in one punch was "ridiculous", because Robert isn't "exactly a small guy". He also mentioned how he noticed that Robert, Aaron and Finn (all of which are either homosexual or bisexual) had been "beaten up, shoved around and/or intimidated by Cain". In August 2017, Hawley was longlisted for "Best Actor" and "Best Bad Boy" at the Inside Soap Awards, while he and Miller were longlisted for "Best Partnership". The nominations for "Best Bad Boy" and "Best Partnership" made the viewer-voted shortlist. In September 2017, Ryan Hawley won "Best Soap Actor" for TV Choice Awards. On 13 March 2018, Ryan Hawley won the industry voted TRIC award for "Best Soap Actor". For his portrayal of Robert, Hawley won the accolade for Best Soap Actor (Male) at the 2018 Digital Spy Reader Awards. Robert's pairing with Aaron also won for the "Best Soap Couple" award.

Monde Mwitumwa from LeedsLive called Robert one of the soap's "most popular yet complicated characters", a "fan favourite" and "truly original". However, he also called Robert a "bad lad", "The Dales troublemaker", "a manipulative killer and a cut-throat businessman", "duplicitous" and a "scheming murderer" who would "stop at nothing to trick people out of their money". Mwitumwa also wrote that Richard Smith played the role of baby Robert "to perfection" and called Christopher Smith's exit from the role "dramatic", as well as noting that Robert's "bitterness" stemmed from his jealousy of Andy. He also wrote that Hawley's version of the character was the most popular out of Robert's portrayers, and called for Robert to return to the show.

== See also ==
- List of soap operas with LGBT characters
- List of soap opera villains
