= Emily Head =

British actress (born 1988)

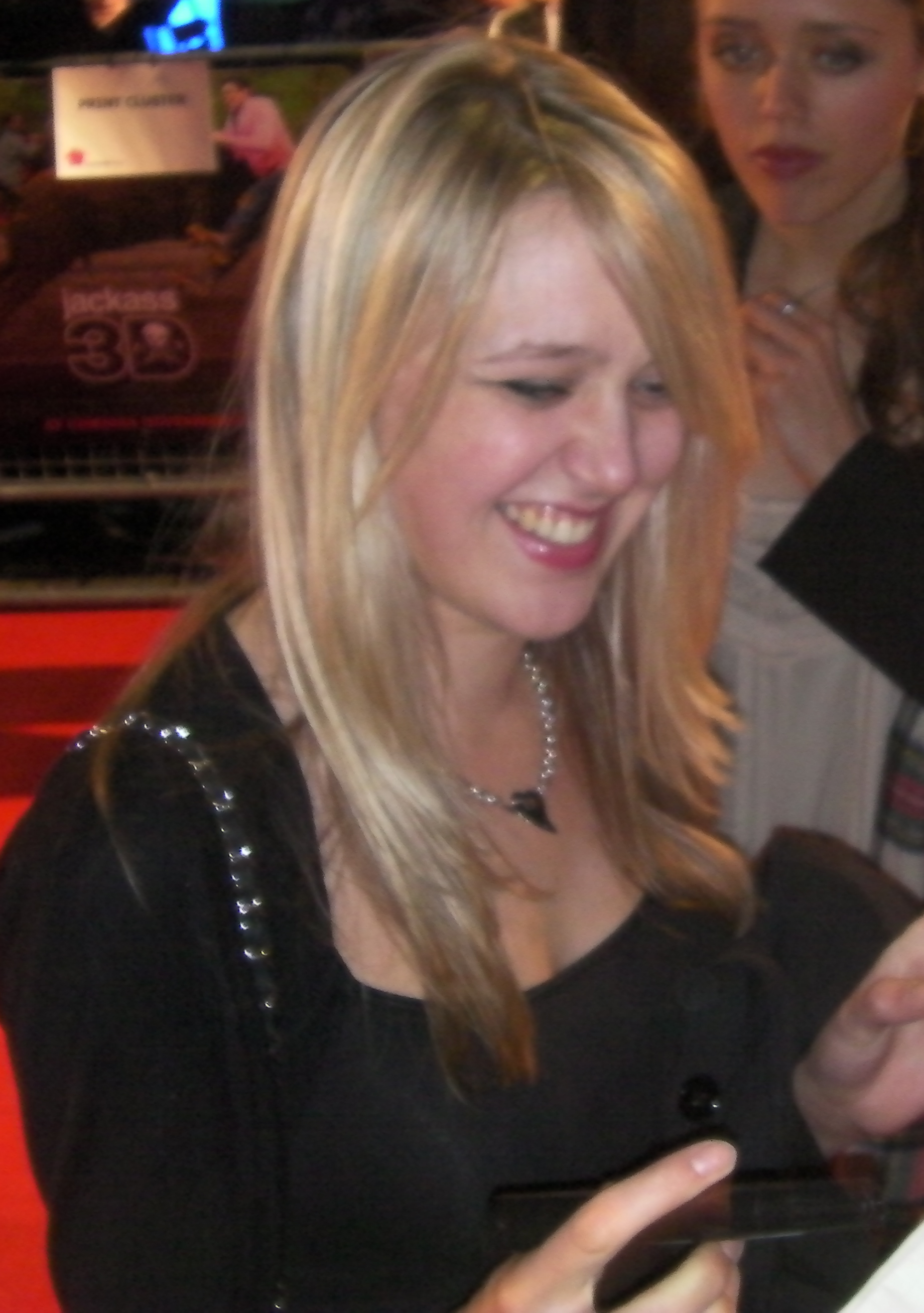
- Head at the Jackass 3D London premiere, 2010
- Born: 15 December 1988 (age 37); Fulham, London, England
- Education: BRIT School
- Occupations: Actress; presenter
- Years active: 2003–present
- Father: Anthony Head
- Relatives: Daisy Head (sister); Helen Shingler (grandmother); Murray Head (uncle)

Emily Head (born 15 December 1988) is an English actress. Her breakout role was as Carli D'Amato in the E4 sitcom The Inbetweeners (2008–2010), and she later played Rebecca White in the ITV soap opera Emmerdale and Colette Andrews in BBC One drama The Syndicate.

== Early life ==
Head is the elder daughter of actor Anthony Head. She has a sister, Daisy, who is also an actress. She attended the BRIT School in Croydon, where she studied acting and was a schoolmate of singers Katy B and Adele.

== Career ==
Head played a supporting role as Carli D'Amato in E4's sitcom The Inbetweeners from 2008 to 2010 and appeared in the follow-up 2011 film The Inbetweeners Movie and is set to reprise the role for The Inbetweeners 3. She also appeared in an episode of M.I. High, in which she played an evil mastermind involved in a bank scam.

In 2011, she appeared alongside Coronation Street star Craig Gazey in Jason Hall's play Third Floor. In December 2011, she played Melissa Milcote in the Bristol Old Vic production of Helen Edmundson's Coram Boy at the Colston Hall in Bristol.

In 2013, it was announced she would be appearing in the Bravo drama Rita, playing the title character's daughter. In 2014, she played Angela "Ange" in an in-the-round production of Abigail's Party at Leicester's Curve.

=== Emmerdale ===
In September 2016, it was announced that Head would be joining the cast of the ITV soap opera Emmerdale, playing the role of Rebecca White. Rebecca is the daughter of Lawrence White (John Bowe), half-sister of Chrissie White (Louise Marwood) and aunt of Lachlan White (Thomas Atkinson). Head made her first appearance as Rebecca on 11 October 2016. Head's character left Emmerdale in the episode broadcast on 2 November 2018.

== Filmography ==
Year	Title	Role	Notes	Ref(s)
2005	Trial & Retribution: The Lovers	Natalie Franke	1 episode	
2007	Doc Martin	Poppy, "Movement"	1 episode	
2008	The Invisibles	Grace Riley	Supporting role	
2008–2010	The Inbetweeners	Carli D'Amato	Main role; 11 episodes	
2010	MI High	Bre (Waitress)	1 episode	
2010	Doctors	Liz Wates	1 episode	
2011	The Inbetweeners Movie	Carli D'Amato	Film	
2011	My Piece of the Pie	Baby-sitter Londres	Film	
2011	William & Catherine: A Royal Romance	Cynthia	Hallmark movie	
2012	Robot Chicken	Mary Poppins / Wife	Voice role; 1 episode	
2015	Doctors	Paula Dowling	1 episode	
2016–2018	Emmerdale	Rebecca White	Regular role; 280 episodes	
2019	The Inbetweeners: Fwends Reunited	Herself	1 episode (special)	
2020	Life	Julia	1 episode	
2021	The Syndicate	Colette Andrews	Main role	
TBA	The Inbetweeners 3	Carli D'Amato	Film	

== Awards and nominations ==
Year	Award	Category	Result	Ref.
2017	22nd National Television Awards	Newcomer	Nominated	
2017	Inside Soap Awards	Best Newcomer	Nominated	
