= Louise Marwood =

English actress and comedian (born 1979)

- Born: Louise Howells; 13 March 1979 (age 47); Bristol, England
- Occupations: Actress; comedian
- Years active: 2002–present
- Known for: Emmerdale

Louise Marwood (born 13 March 1979) is an English actress and comedian, known for playing Chrissie White in the ITV soap opera Emmerdale, which she played from 2014 until 2018.

== Early life ==
Marwood was born on 13 March 1979 in Bristol, England as Louise Howells. She trained at the Oxford School of Drama.

== Career ==
=== Early work ===
Acting under the name of Louise Howells, she appeared in various television programmes including Holby City, Doctors, The Royal, Waking the Dead, Hollyoaks, The Bill and Law & Order: UK. She also appeared as part of sketch show Comedy Bitch until 2010. In 2022, she made an appearance in the BBC One medical drama Casualty, and also joined the ITV soap opera Coronation Street, playing the recurring role of Camilla Perrin.

=== Emmerdale ===
On 4 October 2014, Marwood was cast in the role of Chrissie White in the ITV soap opera Emmerdale, the fiancée of established and returning character Robert Sugden, played by Ryan Hawley respectively. She was also introduced as part of a new Emmerdale fictional family, the White family. Chrissie arrived in the village with her fiancé Robert, her father Lawrence White (John Bowe) and her son Lachlan White (Thomas Atkinson). Marwood made a previously unannounced departure from Emmerdale on 11 January 2018, after her character was killed-off in a car accident. She appeared in 459 episodes.

== Personal life ==
Marwood was born and raised in Bristol, England, under the name of Howells.

In April 2023, Marwood revealed she had been battling a cocaine addiction since leaving her role in Emmerdale in 2018.

== Filmography ==
Year	Title	Role	Notes
2002	Holby City	Sinead Cummings	Episode: "Repercussions"
2003, 2006	Doctors	Sam McGuire	Episodes: "As Time Goes By" and "Too Soon"
2003	The Royal	Paula Brodie	Episode: "The Last Waltz"
2004	Waking the Dead	Roommate	Episode: "Shadowplay: Part 1"
2005	Hollyoaks	Ally Harrison	Recurring role; 4 episodes
2005	Hollyoaks: Crossing the Line	Ally Harrison	All 4 episodes
2005	Hollyoaks: Let Loose	Ally Harrison	Main role; 11 episodes
2006	The Bill	Pam Jackson	Episode: "Echoes (Part 1)"
2007	The Bill	Charley Myers	Episode: "Operation Brass Balls"
2009	Law & Order: UK	Anna Shorofsky	Episodes: "Care" and "Samaritan"
2010	Emmerdale	Fiona Heath	2 episodes
2011	Showreel	Vicky	Film
2012	David's Fine	Viv	Short film
2014	Suspects	Jess Holland	Episode: "Sensitivity"
2014–2018	Emmerdale	Chrissie White	Regular role; 459 episodes
2022	Casualty	Sadie Bexon	Episode: "Break Your Heart"
2022	Coronation Street	Camilla Perrin	4 episodes
2023	Sister Boniface Mysteries	Jackie Rice	Episode: "The Book of Shadows"
