= Ryan Hawley =

English actor (born 1985)

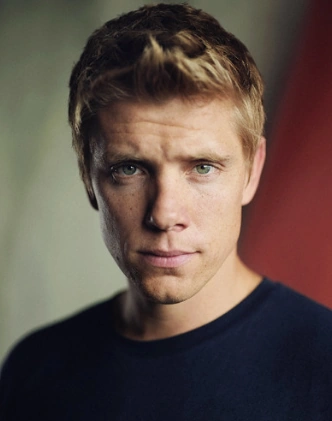
- Ryan Hawley (2021)
- Born: Ryan Alexander Hawley; 21 September 1985 (age 40); Sharjah, United Arab Emirates
- Education: Royal Central School of Speech and Drama
- Occupation: Actor
- Years active: 2007–present
- Known for: Emmerdale
- Spouse: Daisy Prestes de Oliveira (m. 2013)
- Children: 2

Ryan Alexander Hawley (born 21 September 1985) is an English actor, known as Robert Sugden on Emmerdale from 2014 to 2019, and then again from 2025 onwards.

== Early life ==
Hawley, son of Christine and Steve, spent his childhood partly in Sheffield and partly in the UAE due to his parents' work, making him a Third Culture Kid.

In school, Hawley took A-Level Media Studies and took part in numerous school plays, subsequently realising his dream of becoming a film director was very difficult. Hawley went to university and trained to become an actor at The Royal Central School of Speech and Drama in London, England.

== Career ==
Hawley's acting career began in 2007, when he began to appear in a number of television series, films and stage productions. He made his television debut in the pilot of the American series Life Is Wild as Tim. In 2013, he appeared as Andy Thatcher in Devil's Pass, a Russian-British horror film.

In 2014, Hawley was cast in his most prominent role as Robert Sugden on the ITV soap opera Emmerdale, becoming the fourth actor to portray the character.

He has received critical acclaim for his portrayal and has been nominated for several awards, including "Best Villain" and "Best Actor" at The British Soap Awards.

In June 2019, it was announced that Hawley would be leaving Emmerdale after five years. His exit aired on 1 November of that year. In May 2025, Despite initially being reported as a guest stint, it was confirmed soon after that he was being reintroduced permanently.

== Personal life ==
In 2013, Hawley married Daisy Prestes de Oliveira. Together they have a son, born in 2021. They welcomed a second son together in 2023.

In 2025, he revealed he was living with his family in Brazil for about a year between 2023 and 2024, but moved back to the UK to resume his role in Emmerdale.

== Filmography ==
Television and film roles
Year	Title	Role	Notes
2007	Life Is Wild	Tim	Pilot
2008	Doctors	Jeremy Evesham	1 episode
2008	Survivors	Will	1 episode
2008	Live!	Unnamed	Short film
2010	The Wyoming Story	Dakon Thorpe	Television film
2010	Rules of Love	Tarrant	Television film
2010	Between You & Me	Josh	Short film
2011	The Royal	Phil Cooper	1 episode
2012	Red Tails	Mitchell	Film
2012	Titanic	Jack Thayer	2 episodes
2013	Father Brown	John Van Ert	1 episode
2013	Devil's Pass	Andy Thatcher	Film
2014	The Magnificent Eleven	Kurt	Film
2014–2019, 2025–present	Emmerdale	Robert Sugden	Regular role
2021	Silent Witness	Michael Robson	2 episodes
2023–2024	All Creatures Great and Small	Sid Crabtree	2 episodes
2024	Casualty	Jamie Cleveland	5 episodes
2025	Miss Scarlet and the Duke	Mr. Bailey	1 episode

Stage
Year	Title	Role	Venue
2007	The History Boys	Rudge	Wyndhams Theatre and UK Tour
2009	Letting in Air	Adam	Old Red Lion Theatre
2010	You May Go Now	Unnamed	Finborough Theatre

== Awards and nominations ==
Year	Result	Award	Category	Film or series	Character
2015	Nominated	British Soap Awards	Best Newcomer	Emmerdale	Robert Sugden
2015	Nominated	British Soap Awards	Villain of the Year	Emmerdale	Robert Sugden
2015	Won	All About Soap Awards	Best Moment 2014 – Robert Kisses Aaron	Emmerdale	Robert Sugden
2015	Won	Inside Soap Awards	Best Newcomer	Emmerdale	Robert Sugden
2015	Nominated	TV Choice Awards	Best Soap Newcomer	Emmerdale	Robert Sugden
2016	Nominated	British Soap Awards	Villain of the Year	Emmerdale	Robert Sugden
2016	Nominated	British Soap Awards	Best Onscreen Partnership (with Danny Miller)	Emmerdale	Robert Sugden
2016	Won	Inside Soap Awards	Best Partnership (with Danny Miller)	Emmerdale	Robert Sugden
2017	Won	TV Choice Awards	Best Soap Actor	Emmerdale	Robert Sugden
2017	Nominated	Inside Soap Awards	Best Bad Boy	Emmerdale	Robert Sugden
2017	Nominated	Inside Soap Awards	Best Partnership (with Danny Miller)	Emmerdale	Robert Sugden
2017	Won	Digital Spy Readers' Awards	Best Soap Relationship (with Danny Miller)	Emmerdale	Robert Sugden
2018	Won	TRIC Awards	Soap Actor	Emmerdale	Robert Sugden
