= List of Emmerdale characters introduced in 2014 =

Emmerdale is a British soap opera first broadcast on 16 October 1972. The following is a list of characters that first appeared or will appear during 2014, by order of first appearance. William Makepeace (Dudley Sutton) and his grandson, Seb (James Redmond) arrived in February. The following month saw the introduction of Donna Windsor (Verity Rushworth) and Marlon Dingle's (Mark Charnock) daughter, April (Amelia Flanagan). Tracy Shankley (Amy Walsh), Daz Spencer (Mark Jordon), Rakesh Kotecha (Pasha Bocarie) and Carole (Tracy Brabin) made their first appearances in July. Rakesh's son, Kirin (Adam Fielding), made his debut in August. The White family – Lawrence (John Bowe), Chrissie (Louise Marwood) and Lachlan (Thomas Atkinson) – arrived in September, October and November. Additionally, multiple other characters appeared in 2014.

== Ian Chamberlain ==
Ian Chamberlain
- Emmerdale character
- Portrayed by: Robert Cavanah
- First appearance: 6 January 2014
- Last appearance: 17 April 2014
In-universe information
- Wife: Alison Chamberlain
- Daughters: Rebecca Chamberlain; Chloe Chamberlain

Ian Chamberlain, played by Robert Cavanah was a man who Val Pollard (Charlie Hardwick) had a fling with Ian while she was in Portugal. The character's arrival was announced on 28 December 2013, and made his first appearance on 6 January 2014.

Ian arrives in Emmerdale to look for Val. Finn Barton (Joe Gill) points Ian in the direction of The Woolpack, but as he arrives Val hides in the back. Her sister, Diane Sugden (Elizabeth Estensen) tries to persuade him to leave, but she can see what he needs to see is really important. Ian later manages to catch up with Val and their fling in Portugal transpires. Ian's identity is finally revealed, but Val makes it clear that they won't be repeating their fling. He then informs Val that he has HIV and may have passed it on to her. Ian tells Val that she needs to get herself tested. He returns later and they go on a few dates. Val then decides to split with him and he leaves.

Cavanah, who played Ian, returned to Emmerdale on 30 September 2024, but this time playing DS Foy, who was investigating the attack on Thomas King (James Chase).

== Liam Cavanagh ==
Liam Cavanagh
- Emmerdale character
- Portrayed by: Jonny McPherson
- Duration: 2014–present
- First appearance: 9 January 2014
- Crossover appearances: Coronation Street (2021); Doctors (2021); Corriedale (2026)
In-universe information
- Other names: Anna Le Monde
- Occupation: General Practitioner
- Wife: Lara Cavanagh (backstory); Maya Stepney (until 2019); Leyla Harding (2021–2023)
- Daughters: Leanna Cavanagh
- Stepsons: Jacob Gallagher

Dr Liam Cavanagh, played by Jonny McPherson, made his first appearance on 9 January 2014. In June 2018, it was confirmed that McPherson had been promoted to the regular cast. The news came shortly after the character's wife and daughter were introduced.

Dr Cavanagh examines a pregnant Priya Sharma (Fiona Wade) after there are concerns that her eating disorder may be returning. Dr Cavanagh tells her that her baby is fine, but he is still concerned for the health of her and the baby. He tries to give Priya the number for a support group but she refuses to take it, determined that everything will be fine. Later the same month, Val Pollard (Charlie Hardwick) called Dr Cavanagh out to Pollard's Barn to examine her husband Eric Pollard (Chris Chittell), whom she was concerned had contracted HIV. The doctor examined Eric and came to the conclusion that Eric had flu. Liam briefly visits the village and encounters James Barton (Bill Ward) and Finn Barton (Joe Gill) who express to him their concerns for their family member and his colleague, Emma Barton (Gillian Kearney), who has gone missing. James and Finn ask him if he knows anything such as where she might currently be working. Liam is initially reluctant, citing reasons of professional confidentiality but later relents and discreetly slips James some information.

When Leanna tells Liam that she has taken a morning after pill as a result of being sick after losing her virginity to Jacob Gallagher (Joe-Warren Plant), Liam goes to confront Jacob in front of his family. However Jacob insults Leanna in front of her, which results in Liam punching him and he is later arrested for his actions. However Jacob sees the errors of his behaviour and drops the charges.

== William Makepeace ==
William Makepeace, played by Dudley Sutton, made his first screen appearance on 27 February 2014. The character and Sutton's casting was announced on 30 January 2014. The actor commented "This will be my second appearance in Emmerdale as I appeared in 1997 as a tramp! It's great to be back in Yorkshire and I have fond memories of filming the Beiderbecke Trilogy in the same building as Emmerdale is now filmed." William is Seb Makepeace's (James Redmond) grandfather and is cared for by Seb's former girlfriend Ruby Haswell (Alicya Eyo). William has "an old-fashioned attitude" and he makes life difficult for Ruby.

== Seb Makepeace ==
Seb Makepeace, played by James Redmond, made his first screen appearance on 27 February 2014. The character and casting was announced on 30 January 2014. Of his casting, Redmond stated "Having taken a 5-year break from acting to concentrate on stand-up comedy, I am really looking forward to getting back on the horse. It will be great to join the cast of Emmerdale and Seb will be my first time playing a northerner!" Seb is established character Ruby Haswell's (Alicya Eyo) ex-boyfriend. They meet again when Ruby becomes a carer to Seb's grandfather William (Dudley Sutton).

== April Windsor ==
April Windsor
- Emmerdale character
- Portrayed by: Amelia Flanagan
- Duration: 2014–present
- First appearance: Episode 6821; 19 March 2014
In-universe information
- Occupation: Student
- Father: Marlon Dingle
- Mother: Donna Windsor
- Stepmother: Laurel Thomas; Jessie Grant; Rhona Goskirk
- Sisters: Ivy Malcolms (step)
- Half-brothers: Leo Goskirk
- Daughters: Rebecca Windsor
- Grandfathers: Albert Dingle; Vic Windsor
- Grandmothers: Viv Hope
- Uncles: Scott Windsor; Eli Dingle; Heath Hope
- Aunts: Kelly Windsor; Cathy Hope
- First cousins: Elliot Windsor; Jean Tate
- Other relatives: Aaron Livesy; Chas Dingle; Zak Dingle; Cain Dingle; Belle Dingle; Charity Dingle; Debbie Dingle; Noah Dingle; Moses Dingle; Ryan Stocks; Sarah Sugden; Jack Sugden; Nate Robinson; Eve Dingle; Leyla Sugden

April Windsor, played by Amelia Flanagan, made her first screen appearance on 19 March 2014. The character was announced in the same month and plays a part in Donna Windsor's (Verity Rushworth) return storyline. April is Donna and Marlon Dingle's (Mark Charnock) daughter. Rushworth explained that when Donna left the village four years ago, she was pregnant with April at the time. Now April is four, Donna realises that it is time she got to know her father and meet her family. Rushworth continued, "Having said that, Donna is just thinking about little April. She hasn't really considered the impact this will have on Marlon's life." Marlon meets April when he saves her from being run over by a quad bike. In August 2017, Flanagan was longlisted for Best Young Actor at the Inside Soap Awards. She made the viewer-voted shortlist, but lost out to Alfie Clarke, who portrays Arthur Thomas. Flanagan's younger twin siblings, Isabella and William, appear in Coronation Street as cousins Hope Stape and Joseph Brown.

Donna and April arrived in March 2014, telling Marlon, Donna's former stepfather Bob Hope (Tony Audenshaw) and his partner Brenda Walker (Lesley Dunlop). Marlon reacted badly, initially telling Donna that he didn't want anything to do with them and they should return to Essex. Marlon's ex-girlfriend Rhona Goskirk (Zoë Henry) decided she wanted her and Marlon's son Leo Goskirk (Harvey Rogerson) to know that he had a half-sister and met Donna. Marlon came around to the idea of Leo getting to know April but insisted he didn't want either Donna or April in the village and that they must never know that they are siblings.

In 2014, Donna died after jumping from a building with Gary North (Fergus O'Donnell) after he threatened to abuse April. She told her partner Ross Barton (Michael Parr) to tell April that she loved her very much. Later that day, a devastated Marlon broke the news to April about Donna. However, April didn't realise that Donna was dead and went to visit Ross at the garage because she knew he knew Donna well. Ross lashes out at April and she went looking for Donna but later was found the next day. Marlon was then awarded full custody of April and she now lives with him and regularly sees Leo.

In March 2016, April went to see Ross's mother Emma Barton (Gillian Kearney) because she had bruises on her left arm and asked if she could make it better. Bob's daughter Carly Hope (Gemma Atkinson) confided in Marlon that she had a son Billy who died from cot death when he was two months old. April tells Marlon and Carly that Leo hit her, causing the bruises.

Towards the end of 2016, April notices that Marlon and Carly like each other, and she questions if they are already dating or not. Eventually, Marlon and Carly do start dating.

In March 2017, while making a cake for Marlon's birthday, April chokes on a sweet in front of Carly. Terrified, she froze but Marlon managed to bring the sweet up and April starts crying in shock. Marlon is furious at Carly for not trying to save April when she could see that she was choking. The next day Marlon keeps April off school and she runs away to the pirate ship because she thinks Carly doesn't like her as she didn't try to help. Carly explains to April that she was in shock and didn't know what to do. April forgives Carly and said she wants her as a new mother figure to her.

At the end of June 2017, Carly heroically ran into a burning house and dragged an unconscious Ronnie Hale (John McArdle) out, with the help of Rakesh Kotecha (Pasha Bocarie). Marlon and Carly spent the night together on what would've been Billy's birthday. After sleeping together, things became awkward between Marlon and Carly, even more so when April told Carly she wants her to adopt her. Whilst out looking for his missing cousin Belle Dingle (Eden Taylor-Draper), Marlon fell and injured his groin, so Carly carried him home. Whilst nursing his injury with a frozen lasagna, Marlon told Carly they should be friends and she should resume looking after April. Carly admitted that she wanted more as she was in love with Marlon. After a second night together, Bob learned of Marlon and Carly's relationship, and disapproved, although soon came round with a bit of encouragement from Brenda.

In July 2021, after the death of Leanna Cavanagh (Mimi Slinger), April is inspired to create a social media account dedicated to helping those who have lost someone. Whilst April initially receives praise, she is later trolled when a malicious account about Donna is made and April's phone number is circulated online. When she tells Marlon, he makes her delete social media, however she later secretly reinstalls them. In September 2021, April feels betrayed when Bob's daughter Cathy Hope (Gabrielle Downling), who she had been confiding in, reveals that she caused all the hate. April then tells Rhona who goes on a rampage to Bob, Brenda and Cathy, resulting in Rhona being arrested for assaulting Brenda, which upsets April even more.

April and Cathy eventually settle their differences. In March 2022, Marlon has a stroke shortly after getting engaged to Rhona. It is April who finds Marlon and she calls an ambulance. She fears that Marlon will die, but he is cleared to return home and marries Rhona in August, just as April turns thirteen. April develops feelings for her friend Arthur, but is supportive when he comes out as gay, and punches Marshall Hamston (Max Fletcher) for bullying Arthur. In January 2024, her uncle Heath Hope (Sebastian Dowling) dies in a joyriding accident and April grieves his loss.

== Amba Metcalfe ==
Amba Metcalfe
- Emmerdale character
- Portrayed by: Ava Jayasinghe
- Duration: 2014–2023
- First appearance: Episode 6872; 16 May 2014
- Last appearance: Episode 9587; 27 January 2023
In-universe information
- Occupation: Student
- Father: David Metcalfe
- Mother: Priya Sharma
- Stepfather: Rakesh Kotecha
- Stepmother: Alicia Gallagher; Tracy Robinson
- Half-brothers: Jacob Gallagher (adoptive); Theo Metcalfe
- Grandfathers: Eric Pollard; Rishi Sharma
- Grandmothers: Georgia Sharma
- Uncles: Jai Sharma; Nikhil Sharma
- Nieces: Leyla Sugden (adoptive)
- First cousins: Mia Macey; Molly Sharma; Archie Breckle; Eliza Sharma

Amba Metcalfe, played by Ava Jayasinghe is the daughter of David Metcalfe (Matthew Wolfenden) and Priya Sharma (Fiona Wade). She is born seven weeks premature. She is delivered by her stepmother Alicia Metcalfe (Natalie Anderson) and Alicia's sister, Leyla Harding (Roxy Shahidi).

She departed the series when Priya left the village for a job in London.

== Gary North ==
Gary North
- Emmerdale character
- Portrayed by: Fergus O'Donnell
- First appearance: 29 May 2014
- Last appearance: 15 August 2014
In-universe information
- Occupation: Criminal

Gary North played by Fergus O'Donnell, was a notorious crime lord. Ross Barton (Michael Parr) robs Gary and he retaliates by hiring a man called Brad to gas Ross's brother Finn (Joe Gill). Donna Windsor (Verity Rushworth) tries to help Ross by planting illegal drugs in Gary's house, but Gary finds them and disposes of them. Gary later threatens Donna and her daughter, April (Amelia Flanagan). Gary's final job is to retrieve explicit photographs from a safe in a nightclub owned by his arch enemy, Stephen. Donna and Ross attempt to get to the photos, but their plan goes wrong. Stephen brutally beats Ross, while Gary forces Donna to watch. Donna goes to face Gary alone on the roof of the police station and she threatens him with a taser gun, however, North has back up, aiming at Donna. Gary threatens to harm April, saying she will be the subject of an explicit photo, and so Donna puts the gun down. Ross runs towards them and Donna tells him that she lied and she really does love him. She then handcuffs herself to Gary and jumps off the roof, killing herself and Gary.

Upon the character's departure, an Emmerdale statement teased: "Things take a dramatic turn when Donna meets Gary and realises he has brought back-up. Ross can only look on in horror as Donna makes the ultimate sacrifice." Rushworth told Digital Spy: "You can expect a massive shock, a stunt, lots of drama, lots of heartache, lots of tragedy. [It's] a completely unexpected end for Donna that I don't think people will realise. [There's] lots of heat, intensity, tears and drama basically – quite epic! And a massive twist, so watch out for the twist!" Rushworth also discussed the nature of Gary's character and how it impacted her exit story: "Donna's story of her journey with terminal illness is quite a unique one for her, because most people would want to spend lots of time with their family. But for her, she knows April's in danger and Gary North is a huge threat to April. As soon as she realises how dangerous Gary is, she has to prioritise protecting April over being with her and her last few weeks. Her priorities have shifted from what you'd think would normally happen."

== Tracy Shankley ==
Tracy Shankley
- Emmerdale character
- Portrayed by: Amy Walsh
- Duration: 2014–present
- First appearance: Episode 6907; 7 July 2014
In-universe information
- Other names: Cindy; Tracy Robinson; Tracy Metcalfe
- Occupation: Cleaner; Shop assistant Guest liaison
- Father: Frank Clayton
- Mother: Yvette Shankley
- Half-sisters: Vanessa Woodfield
- Husband: David Metcalfe (2016–2018); Nate Robinson (2023–2024)
- Daughters: Frankie Robinson
- Stepsons: Jacob Gallagher
- Stepdaughters: Amba Metcalfe
- Nephews: Johnny Woodfield

Tracy Shankley (also Robinson and Metcalfe), played by Amy Walsh, made her first screen appearance on 7 July 2014. Walsh's casting was initially announced on 2 May 2014, but it was not confirmed which character she would be playing until 1 July. Tracy is initially introduced as a love interest for established character Sam Dingle (James Hooton). Daniel Kilkelly from Digital Spy reported that Tracy is "a chaotic character who divides opinion when she makes her first appearance in the village". Tracy comes to Emmerdale to meet Sam, after they begin talking via an adult chat line. Sam asks Tracy to stay with him, but his stepmother, Lisa (Jane Cox), kicks Tracy out when she becomes suspicious of her. Sam and Tracy then move into Brook Cottage with Robbie Lawson (Jamie Shelton). It was confirmed that Tracy would return in 2015 after Walsh impressed producers and wanted the character to return. Tracy returned later in 2015 as a series regular. On 6 September 2021, Walsh announced that she was expecting her first child and would be going on maternity leave. She departed on 14 January 2022.

Tracy cons Sam on her arrival and leaves with his money. Sam finds her sleeping rough in a barn and he invites her to stay with him, much to Zak and Lisa's horror. When Sam's ex-girlfriend Rachel Breckle (Gemma Oaten) returns, they reconcile and Tracy is thrown out. Tracy intends to leave the village again. Whilst staying at the B&B, Val Pollard (Charlie Hardwick) takes her in and gives her a job. She tries to leave the village again and steal money out of Val's purse, but Val finds her and becomes annoyed with her. When Val dies in a helicopter crash, she finds Val's farewell videos humorous. In September 2016 she marries David Metcalfe (Matthew Wolfenden) but they separate in March 2018 after David struggles to accept Tracy's past as a prostitute along with the discovery of his one-night stand with Leyla Harding (Roxy Shahidi) the previous Christmas. The former couple sleep together in June 2018 which results in Tracy falling pregnant, but after learning that David has moved on and is now in a relationship with Maya Stepney (Louisa Clein) she undergoes an abortion.

When Tracy finds out her stepson Jacob Gallagher (Joe-Warren Plant) is being groomed by Maya she takes part in a plot to kidnap her and run her out of town with Leyla and Priya Sharma (Fiona Wade). However, after an altercation with Maya the women believe they have killed her. It later transpires Maya survived her injuries and is soon arrested, tried and sentenced for her crimes. In an attempt to move on from her marriage, Tracy takes an interest in Billy Fletcher (Jay Kontzle) and after a series of false starts, they plan to meet at the factory for a night of passion in August 2019. However, a drunk Tracy inadvertently starts a fire, gets trapped in a cupboard and has to be rescued by her father Frank Clayton (Michael Praed), who dies after an explosion at the factory throws him against a van. Tracy is overwhelmed with guilt for feeling as though she caused her father's death and once this is revealed to her sister Vanessa Woodfield (Michelle Hardwick), a major rift develops between the siblings. However, they reconcile when Vanessa is diagnosed with bowel cancer in March 2020. Tracy supports her sister through her treatment. After a fling with Pete Barton (Anthony Quinlan), Tracy begins a relationship with Nate Robinson (Jurell Carter) in February 2020, which is met with immediate disapproval from the villagers following his affair with Moira Dingle (Natalie J. Robb), the wife of his father Cain (Jeff Hordley). The relationship is initially just a bit of fun for both involved, but turns serious when Tracy discovers she is pregnant. Tracy gives birth to a daughter, Frankie, in February 2021 with Nate by her side but she immediately struggles to cope. This goes unnoticed by family and friends as they think she is just suffering from lack of sleep. Suffering with post-natal depression in silence for months results in Tracy trying to take her own life by jumping off the viaduct in August 2021 but after coming to her senses she leaves Frankie in Nate's care and commits herself to a psychiatric ward to get the help she needs.

Tracy returns to the village a few months later, determined to resume normal life with Nate and Frankie. However her world is turned upside down in December 2021 when she learns Nate has had a one-night stand with Fiona, Vanessa's new girlfriend. After realising she cannot forgive him Tracy accepts a job offer with a post-natal depression charity in Nottingham and departs the village with Frankie in January 2022.

Laura-Jayne Tyler of Inside Soap spoke negatively of Tracy's book storyline, writing: "The last thing she needs, as we head into Week 327 of this storyline, is renewed confidence." On Tracy's abortion, Walsh stated: "going through that with David was something she never envisaged having to do but she knew it was the right decision at the time. I think she had to do it with David as she knew she would've fallen back in with him and depending on him and he didn't deserve that". In July 2020, it was announced that Tracy would become pregnant with Nate Robinson's (Jurell Carter) baby. On the storyline, Walsh said that for Tracy, the news "does come as a massive surprise and in general it's quite shocking news to hear". Digital Spy noted that it would bring back memories from her abortion, and Walsh stated that she is "a bit older than she was then, she's a bit more strong and independent". On Tracy and Nate's relationship, Walsh commented that "neither of them really know how each other feels about each other – they've never properly told each other that they love each other or any of that – so it is very soon to be going into parenthood together. They know it's a bit ridiculous that this is where they're at in this stage of the relationship". Despite this, Walsh stated that both characters would be happy to be parents, and that they "know that they can do it".

After leaving in January 2022 and making a brief appearance in the 50th anniversary last October, Tracy returned on 3 July 2023 to Emmerdale permanently as she marries Nate Robinson on her return. She becomes Tracy Robinson as titled in the closing credits on 3 July 2023.

== Daz Spencer ==
Daz Spencer
- Emmerdale character
- Portrayed by: Mark Jordon
- Duration: 2014, 2017–2019, 2024
- First appearance: Episode 6908/6909; 8 July 2014
- Last appearance: Episode 10,169; 20 December 2024
In-universe information
- Occupation: Soldier (backstory); Cafe waiter (2017–2018)
- Brothers: Dan Spencer
- Sisters: Karen Spencer
- Daughters: Amelia Spencer
- Granddaughters: Esther Spencer
- Nephews: Sean Spencer
- Other relatives: Ali Spencer (sister-in law, 1994–2012); Chas Dingle (sister-in law, 2012–2013)

Daz Spencer, played by Mark Jordon, made his first screen appearance on 8 July 2014. The character and Jordon's casting was announced on 5 May 2014. Of his casting, Jordon stated "ITV Studios in Leeds has always felt like a second home and I'm really looking forward to being back there, this time with the cast and crew of Emmerdale." Daz is the brother of established character Dan Spencer (Liam Fox). He is a former soldier, holding the rank of Staff Sergeant, who easily makes friends with the local residents, but his presence leaves his brother "feeling conflicted." Daniel Kilkelly from Digital Spy reported that Dan would be unsettled by his brother's "wayward reputation" and that he may be jealous of his Daz's popularity in the village.

Daz arrives in Emmerdale village and is immediately popular with his brother, Dan's, fiancée Kerry Wyatt (Laura Norton) and his son Sean (Luke Roskell). Eventually, Sean and Kerry manage to persuade Dan to allow Daz to stay with them for a while. Noticing how close Daz is getting to married barmaid Alicia Metcalfe (Natalie Anderson), Dan tries to warn Alicia's husband David (Matthew Wolfenden) that Daz will ruin their marriage. His plan fails, however, when he witnesses Daz, David and Alicia having a friendly chat in the local pub. A few days later, Daz arranges a burglary at David and Alicia's shop, which leads to Alicia being mildly attacked. Daz tries to run after the burglar, but he punches Daz in the nose, causing him to suffer a nosebleed. David and Alicia hail Daz "the hero", but Dan is suspicious about Daz's actions. He later meets up with the burglar and praises him for punching him in the face, and states that it made the burglary look more realistic and dramatic.

A few weeks later, Daz causes more trouble for Dan, after constantly flirting with Kerry and convincing Sean to go into the army. Dan and his ex-wife, Ali (Kelli Hollis), are furious that Sean has signed up for the army, and while Dan shouts at Daz for convincing Sean to sign up, Kerry defends Daz. This leads to Kerry punching Dan in the face after an argument over Daz. Kerry and Daz then go on a night out and steal a bus from Hotten. On Dan's stag night and Kerry's hen party, Daz and Kerry leave the parties early, and Daz makes a pass at Kerry, just as Dan enters. He angrily declares that the wedding is off, much to Kerry's and Daz's upsets. The next day, Kerry tries to win Dan round, and frantically gets dressed for their wedding. Daz, however, tries to persuade Kerry not to go through with the wedding and to go into town with him. However, Kerry eventually learns about Daz's deception; she is furious with Daz and, whilst belittling him, declares that Dan is better than him. Daz is later seen congratulating Dan and Kerry for getting married, which is soon interrupted when Kerry's secret husband Kev Berry (Christopher Connel) turns up in The Woolpack at her reception; Daz's attempt to interfere doesn't stop a fight breaking up in which he and Dan, along with both Kerry and Kev, are all arrested by the police. Afterwards, Dan tells the police that Daz stole a bus from Hotten. Daz is furious that Dan grassed him up, which leads to the pair having an argument that ends with Dan kicking Daz out of the house. Daz then leaves the village.

Daz returned in 2017, having lived without a roof over his head for three years. Kerry then took him in, despite Dan's hatred for his brother. Daz was made to live in Hettie the camper van, until he got back on his feet. He got a job at the cafe, working as a waiter, and life seemed to be going well for him, until it was discovered he had a military knife in his possession; at some point during his homelessness period, Daz was beaten up by a group of hooligans, and left hospitalized. Since then, he has carried it with him, in self-defence as the incident left him with Posttraumatic stress disorder. Later on, after Amelia tries to help Daz create a digital CV of himself, a loan shark appeared and robbed the cafe's cash desk, later turning up at Dale Head and stealing the television. Dan once again threatened to throw Daz out, as it was revealed the loan shark was from his past, but Kerry and Amelia pleaded on Daz's behalf, and he was allowed to stay. Daz later developed an interest in Bernice, an interest that was reciprocated, to the extent that they had dinner together a few times. However, Bernice's daughter, Gabby, disapproved of this relationship, and she and Liv threatened Daz; if he caught them helping themselves to alcohol, or doing things they would otherwise be disciplined for, they would say he was plying them.

On 5 December 2024, it was announced that Jordon would reprise the role of Daz once more as part of Amelia's exit storyline, who was axed earlier in the year. Daisy Campbell, who plays Amelia, spoke to Digital Spy about Jordon's return: "It was emotional to film the final episodes. It was weird, because we film in two-week blocks. So, the first week was really emotional, because Mark Jordon, who plays Daz, comes back. It was lovely to see him again. Then on the second week, I think I was used to it. I was really dreading my last block, because I hate crying in front of people unless it's for a scene. But my last week just felt fine. I didn't really cry that much. I was actually proud of myself. I was like: 'Oh, I've not got teary scenes this week'. But it was emotional, really emotional." So, that was really emotional, and whenever I work with Laura Norton, who plays Kerry, she's so good at doing emotions. The way she cries, I cry!" She added: "Amelia ends up going to live back with Daz in Leicester. We had a scene where I had to say: 'I'm off to move to Leicester with Esther!' So she ends up moving back with Daz, which is nice. He comes back for one episode, which is lovely."

== Rakesh Kotecha ==
Rakesh Kotecha
- Emmerdale character
- Portrayed by: Pasha Bocarie
- Duration: 2014–2017
- First appearance: Episode 6914; 14 July 2014
- Last appearance: Episode 7850; 14 June 2017
In-universe information
- Occupation: Lawyer
- Wife: Priya Kotecha (2016–2020)
- Sons: Kirin Kotecha
- Daughters: Rhoni Kotecha
- Stepdaughters: Amba Metcalfe
- Grandsons: Johnny Woodfield

Rakesh Kotecha, played by Pasha Bocarie, made his first screen appearance on 14 July 2014. The character and casting was announced on 11 June 2014. Rakesh is a businessman, who was introduced as part of an arranged marriage storyline for Priya Sharma (Fiona Wade). While Priya believes she and Rakesh are well suited, her brother Jai (Chris Bisson) is not happy with arrival of his "old business associate." David Metcalfe (Matthew Wolfenden) also becomes suspicious of Rakesh.

On 14 June 2015, it was announced that Bocarie had signed a new contract with Emmerdale which would see him in the show for another year as Rakesh. Bocarie commented on his new contract saying: "When they offered me a contract it was a real moment of celebration. I knew straight away I wanted to stay on. I knew my current contract was coming to its end but I was thinkingly positively." He also spoke about how he was unaware whether he could be killed off, but he is happy to know he is staying with the soap. On 14 June 2017, Bocarie made a previously unannounced departure from the series; on-screen, Priya tells Rakesh that she has had sex with another man (who, unknowingly to Rakesh, was Pete Barton (Anthony Quinlan)). This, and Rakesh' arson being revealed, leads to Rakesh deciding to leave the village. Despite Bocarie's departure being hinted to, it had not been confirmed by show officials. Bocarie thanked fans for their "love and support" and called his time on the show "a privilege".

== Carole ==
Carole, played by Tracy Brabin, made her first screen appearance on 23 July 2014. The character and casting was announced on 30 June 2014. Of her casting, Brabin said "It is a total delight to be playing Carole back in my home town of Leeds. She's funny and sexy with a dark secret. Ever since I played Tricia in Coronation Street, it's been a personal and professional ambition to work with the wonderful actors and writers of Emmerdale. I hope the public take to Carole as much as I have." Carole will be introduced as a love interest for established character Ashley Thomas (John Middleton). Ashley is initially reluctant to introduce Carole to his friends, but Harriet Finch (Katherine Dow Blyton) texts Carole using Ashley's phone and Carole soon arrives in the village.

== Kirin Kotecha ==
Kirin Kotecha
- Emmerdale character
- Portrayed by: Adam Fielding (2014–2016); Rish Shah (2020)
- Duration: 2014–2016, 2020
- First appearance: Episode 6951; 21 August 2014
- Last appearance: Episode 8839; 17 September 2020
In-universe information
- Occupation: Businessman
- Father: Rakesh Kotecha
- Stepmother: Priya Sharma
- Sisters: Rhoni Kotecha
- Sons: Johnny Woodfield

Kirin Kotecha made his first screen appearance on 21 August 2014. The character and casting was announced on 23 July 2014; Kirin was initially played by Adam Fielding. Fielding's character is the teenage son of Rakesh Kotecha (Pasha Bocarie) and a new love interest for Vanessa Woodfield (Michelle Hardwick). Kirin will meet Vanessa while on a night out in Hotten, things become awkward when Vanessa learns Kirin is only 17. Of his casting, Fielding said "I am thrilled to be joining Emmerdale as Kirin. He's only 17 but he's a cool and confident guy and isn't going to let his age stop him where Vanessa is concerned." On 18 August 2020, it was announced that Kirin would be returning to Emmerdale after four years, with the role recast to Rish Shah.

Kirin and Vanessa sleep together after meeting on a night out. The next day, he moves to the village and meets his father's fiancée Priya Sharma (Fiona Wade) and gives him his blessing. Kirin and Vanessa meet again and Kirin admits that he is seventeen, much to Vanessa's horror. Vanessa later decides to start a relationship with him and they announce this to Rakesh. Rakesh disapproves with the relationship, but Priya is accepts it. When Vanessa becomes pregnant, she dumps Kirin, after she slept with Adam. Kirin cannot forgive Vanessa and starts rebelling. Rakesh finds out Kirin is the father of Vanessa's baby and changes the DNA result, in order to prevent Kirin and Vanessa resuming their relationship. Kirin finishes college and starts looking at business ventures. Kirin goes into business with Belle Dingle (Eden Taylor-Draper), after their cordial business becomes a success. They employ Laurel Potts (Charlotte Bellamy) as a mascot for their opening evening for the cordial. One day, Vanessa is knocked over by Jai Sharma (Chris Bisson), after he took cocaine. This causes Vanessa to go into labour and she gives birth to a boy, whom she names Johnny, after Adam's late father. Vanessa thanks Kirin for the support. Belle and Kirin begin a relationship soon after, much to the horror of Belle's parents, who warn him not to take advantage of her. After the success of his and Belle's new drink going to Sharma & Sharma, Kirin agrees to go for a drink with Jai. Jai suffers from a drug overdose, so Kirin leaves him at the front of the hospital. Jai later returns the following day and confronts Kirin. Priya then calls the police off Jai but when the police pull Jai and Kirin over in Jai's car, Kirin says that the drugs are his and is arrested. When Belle returns, her parents inform her of Kirin's previous arrest during when she was away. She ends her relationship with Kirin. He then finds out that he is Johnny's biological father and tells Rakesh that he does not want any involvement with him from that day forward. Rakesh is left devastated. Kirin then decides to become a better father to Johnny, but struggles when Vanessa temporary leaves for a few days. When Johnny will not stop crying, Kirin then picks him up to shake him until Carly Hope (Gemma Atkinson) arrives and stops him.

After seeing Vanessa let Adam hold Johnny for a few minutes in the pub, Kirin angrily drives away at top speed. He then accidentally runs over and kills Tess Harris (Nicola Stephenson). He abandons the car in the woods and sets it on fire. Vanessa then tells Kirin that all parents make mistakes and forgives him. When Sam Dingle (James Hooton) discovers his burnt-out car, Kirin panics and decides to leave before he is caught. When Vanessa walks in on him with his bags packed, he lies and says that he does not love Johnny, states that he is not cut out for parenthood, and suggests it would be better if Vanessa lied to Johnny about his real father. Vanessa throws him out. He then tells Rakesh about the hit-and-run. Rakesh promises to get the best legal counsel for Kirin and seemingly convinces him to stay and face the music. While Rakesh is upstairs for a few minutes, Kirin steals his car and flees. Following this, he fled to continental Europe, before ending up in South America, where he contacted Rakesh and requested £20,000 to settle down there. This was a contributing factor to the financial troubles that resulted in Rakesh burning down Mill Cottage to claim the insurance money to pay off his debt. The fire itself resulted in Nicola King (Nicola Wheeler) becoming paralysed and Ronnie Hale (John McArdle) slipping into a coma, and the plan ultimately backfired when the insurance company concluded the fire was started fraudulently.

Kirin returns in September 2020 when he learns that Charity Dingle (Emma Atkins) wants to adopt his son; he demands £15,000 in return for signing the adoption form. Unable to raise the funds, Charity offers Kirin £12,000, which he takes when he sees nearby police cars. However, he injures himself trying to break into a garage; Paddy Kirk (Dominic Brunt) finds him and calls for an ambulance and the police. Charity learns that he is in the hospital, and disguises herself as a nurse in offer to talk to him. She promises Kirin that she will sneak him out of hospital in return for signing the adoption forms, but then reveals that she had no intention of helping him to escape, and gives him advice for going to prison. Kirin is later sentenced to seven years imprisonment for the hit-and-run on Tess.

In 2020, Gary Gillatt from Inside Soap joked about Kirin's recast, writing that the "new Kirin looks as if he could be the old Kirin's son – never mind have a child of his own!"

== Juliette Holliday ==
Juliette Holliday
- Emmerdale character
- Portrayed by: Amelia Curtis
- Duration: 2014, 2016, 2021
- First appearance: Episode 6985; 3 November 2014
- Last appearance: Episode 9121; 9 August 2021
In-universe information
- Husband: Greg Holliday
- Sons: Carl Holliday

Juliette Holliday, played by Amelia Curtis is the mother of Carl Holliday (Charlie Munro Boyce), who first arrives at Home Farm heavily pregnant and reveals to Jimmy King (Nick Miles) and his wife Nicola King (Nicola Wheeler) that Jimmy is the father of her baby. She admits that this is her first meeting with Jimmy, but it later transpires that Jimmy donated sperm to a sperm bank, and that Juliette has been supplied with the wrong sperm. Juliette later reveals that her husband left her when she became obsessed with having a baby, and later reveals that she intends on naming her unborn child Carl, which is coincidental after Jimmy's deceased brother was named Carl (Tom Lister). Juliette returns a week later and gives birth in Jimmy and Nicola's house to baby Carl, and Nicola is forced to deliver him. Juliette later asks Jimmy if he wants anything to do with Carl, and Jimmy agrees he wants access to his newborn son, although does not tell Nicola. Juliette announces she is moving closer to the village, but later leaves on behalf of Carl.

In January 2016, Jimmy calls Juliette asking to see Carl and she arrives in the village, revealing that her husband has left her and she is struggling to look after Carl. Jimmy offers to look after Carl whilst she clears her head, to the shock of Nicola. Juliette returns again in February when she is expected to take Carl back to live with her, but still in an unstable mindset, requests Jimmy and Nicola continue to look after Carl. They are delighted with this and discuss having Jimmy and Nicola as the legal guardians of Carl.

Juliette returns again in January 2021, wanting to be a part of Carl's life again. Over the next few months, she made many attempts to build a relationship and even gain custody of him. She moved closer to the village by renting a flat nearby. Her presence begins to affect Jimmy and Nicola's relationship as they both had different views on Juliette's involvement in Carl's future, which only gets worse when Jimmy's involvement in Paul Ashdale's death is revealed. As a result, Juliette begins to sense that something's not quite right with the Kings' relationship and encourages them to allow Carl to stay with her more often. She then decides to hire a private investigator to find out information from them, using their marriage woes to try and get custody of Carl. In August, she announces her intentions of moving to New York, leaving Jimmy and Nicola worried that she'll take Carl with her, however she shocks them when she reveals that she wants to cut all ties from Carl, as her boyfriend Allister doesn't like children and that she struggled with parenting.

== Lawrence White ==
Lawrence White
- Emmerdale character
- Portrayed by: John Bowe
- Duration: 2014–2018
- First appearance: Episode 6986; 30 September 2014
- Last appearance: Episode 8041; 11 January 2018
In-universe information
- Occupation: Businessman
- Brothers: Henry White
- Wife: Ellen White (backstory); Bernice Blackstock (2015–2016)
- Daughters: Rebecca White
- Adoptive daughters: Chrissie White
- Stepdaughters: Gabby Thomas
- Grandsons: Sebastian White; Lachlan White (adoptive)

Lawrence Alexander Hugo White, played by John Bowe, made his first screen appearance on 30 September 2014. Bowe was initially contracted for six months. Of his casting, Bowe said "I am delighted to be joining the cast of Emmerdale and having already recorded scenes involving Edna's long forgotten past, it is now fantastic to have been given the keys to Home Farm. I can't wait to stir things up." Lawrence had an affair with Edna Birch's (Shirley Stelfox) husband, Harold, and she reported Lawrence to the police, who then sent him to prison. Edna assumed that Lawrence had died, before they came face-to-face again. On 3 October 2014, it was announced that Lawrence and his family would become the new owners of Home Farm. On 27 April 2017, Bowe revealed that he would be leaving the soap after being axed by new executive producer, Iain MacLeod. Lawrence, along with Chrissie, was killed off on 11 January 2018 in a car accident involving the White family.

Lawrence had an affair with Edna's husband Harold, during a time when homosexuality was illegal. Edna found out about the affair and reported him to the police. She believed Lawrence died in prison. In fact, Lawrence married a woman, Ellen, and had two daughters, Chrissie (Louise Marwood) and Rebecca (Emily Head). Lawrence moves into Home Farm and looks around the village. He meets Edna and is shocked. They talk and he reveals that after his prison sentence, he changed his ways and settled down. His daughter Chrissie and her fiancé Robert Sugden (Ryan Hawley), along with his grandson Lachlan (Thomas Atkinson), move into Home Farm. Lawrence shows resent towards Robert and tries to convince Chrissie to call off their engagement. Robert then stages a robbery, resulting in Lawrence suffering an angina attack. Lawrence and Robert then start to bond, after he believes that Robert saved him and Chrissie.

In 2015, Lawrence falls in love with Bernice Blackstock (Samantha Giles) and they quickly become engaged. When their wedding day arrives, Lawrence offers Bernice the option of having an open marriage if she becomes unhappy with him. Bernice becomes concerned about this, so Lawrence decides to call the wedding off. Whilst Lawrence tells the guests about the wedding being called off, Bernice turns up having realised how much she loves Lawrence and the ceremony carries on as planned.

David Metcalfe (Matthew Wolfenden) finds out that Lachlan and Lawrence's stepdaughter, Gabby (Rosie Bentham), were responsible for the break in at Eric Pollard's (Chris Chittell) house and the theft of Val's ring. David is unhappy at Lawrence's discipline suggestion by paying for damages and insists on phoning the police. When Gabby's father, Ashley Thomas (John Middleton), finds out what Gabby has done, he is furious with Bernice and Lawrence and insists Gabby lives with him full-time. Later, Lawrence talks to Ashley, agreeing with what he said and the reason he is soft with Gabby is because he doesn't feel like it's his place to discipline Gabby, but Ashley reminds him he has to be a dad through the bad as well as the good. They later inform Bernice of the plan for Lawrence to adopt Gabby when Ashley's dementia worsens. Lawrence arranges for Lachlan and Gabby to apologise to Eric in front of their parents. When Gabby complains about being embarrassed and that Lawrence isn't her father, Ashley tells her that Lawrence is as much of a parent to her as him and Bernice. Later, Lawrence finds Lachlan's laptop open and finds footage of Bernice. He suspects Lachlan is responsible, when in fact it is Chrissie and he tells Bernice what Lachlan may be doing. Chrissie later confesses it was her and that she didn't want Bernice betraying him, but Chrissie learns her dad offered Bernice an open marriage and did the same with her mother. Chrissie later fears that she and Rebecca may not be Lawrence's children. A few weeks later Chrissie's new boyfriend Andy Sugden (Kelvin Fletcher) convinces her to ask for a DNA test but after an argument over it Lawrence finally tells Chrissie the truth, that he is not her real father. Ronnie Hale (John McArdle), who Bernice believes to be Chrissie's biological father, turns up at Home Farm looking for Lawrence. He reveals that Chrissie asked him to fix a leak weeks before. They have an argument until Bernice interrupts. Ronnie says goodbye to Lawrence and leaves. He tells Bernice who he really is. It is later confirmed that Lawrence and Ronnie were lovers while he was married to Ellen. When he sees Ronnie talking to Lachlan he orders him to leave but Ronnie refuses. He then asks Sam Dingle (James Hooton) to kill Ronnie. He reluctantly agrees. When he goes to shoot him Ronnie talks him down. He then gives Lawrence back the gun and confronts him. Lawrence accidentally hits Ronnie and Ronnie leaves telling Lawrence that he won't be seeing him again. Lawrence later tells Bernice she made the biggest mistake of her life marrying him.

== Nisha Sharma ==
Nisha Sharma
- Emmerdale character
- Portrayed by: Sheena Patel
- First appearance: Episode 6991; 6 October 2014
- Last appearance: Episode 6992/3; 7 October 2014
In-universe information
- Occupation: Mehnndi Artist
- Father: Amit Sharma
- Mother: Sanya Sharma
- Brothers: Suni Sharma
- Half-brothers: Jai Sharma
- Husband: Raj
- Uncles: Rishi Sharma
- Nephews: Archie Breckle
- Nieces: Mia Macey; Eliza Sharma
- First cousins: Nikhil Sharma; Priya Sharma
- Other relatives: Molly Sharma; Amba Metcalfe

Nisha Sharma, played by Sheena Patel, is the cousin of Priya (Fiona Wade), who attends her Mehnndi hen party, ahead of her arranged marriage to Rakesh Kotecha (Pasha Bocarie). Nisha tells Priya that it took her a year to fall in love with her husband Raj, which was also an arranged marriage.

In 2023, Nisha was mentioned again when her brother Suni Sharma (Brahmdeo Shannon Ramana), and father Amit Sharma (Anil Goutam), are introduced to the series, following the revelation that Rishi Sharma (Bhasker Patel), wasn't Jai Sharma's (Chris Bisson) biological father. It was revealed that Jai's mother Georgia Sharma (Lin Blakley) had a fling with her father Amit Sharma (Anil Goutam), who is Jai's biological father. When her brother Suni and father Amit arrived in the village, it was revealed that Nisha had left her husband, Raj.

== Carl Holliday ==
Carl Holliday
- Emmerdale character
- Portrayed by: Dexter Sol Ansell (2016); Charlie Munro Joyce (2016–present)
- Duration: 2014, 2016–present
- First appearance: 7 October 2014
In-universe information
- Occupation: Student
- Father: Jimmy King
- Mother: Juliette Holliday
- Adoptive mother: Nicola King
- Half-brothers: Elliot Windsor
- Half-sisters: Angelica King
- Grandfathers: Tom King
- Uncles: Carl King; Matthew King; Max King
- First cousins: Thomas King; Anya King

Carl Holliday made his first on screen appearance on 7 October 2014. He's the son of Jimmy King (Nick Miles) and Juliette Holliday (Amelia Curtis).

Carl was conceived after a mix up at the fertility clinic meant Juliette was impregnated with Jimmy's sperm rather than that of her chosen donor. Juliette tracked down Jimmy so he could sign the papers that waved his rights to her unborn baby but she ended up going into labour at Jimmy's house. Jimmy's wife Nicola King (Nicola Wheeler) helped Juliette deliver a son, whom she named Carl, unaware that it was also the name of Jimmy's deceased brother Carl King (Tom Lister). Juliette initially allowed Jimmy to have access to Carl but that stopped when she and her husband reconciled and decided to be a proper family. Nicola guilt-tripped Juliette into allowing Jimmy to see Carl for one last time, but Nicola took him and ran away. Nicola returned not long afterwards and Juliette was persuaded not to press charges against her.

In January 2016, Jimmy called Juliette to check up on Carl. Juliette appeared in the café and gave Carl to Jimmy explaining her husband had left her again. Jimmy agreed to look after Carl until Juliette had put her life back together. A few weeks later, Juliette agreed to give Jimmy parental responsibility as Carl was staying with Jimmy and Nicola on a more permanent basis.

After struggling to juggle childcare, Nicola became a stay-at-home mother to Carl, and his half-siblings Elliot Windsor (Luca Hoyle) and Angelica King (Rebecca Bakes), but she soon became fed up and she and Jimmy switched roles so he became a full-time stay-at-home father.

In January 2021, Juliette returned to the village, looking to get to know Carl now that she felt more able to care for him. Juliette's return was met with hostility from Jimmy and Nicola, who were understandably worried about losing Carl, and they insisted that Juliette leave them alone. However, the situation was taken out of their hands when Juliette approached Carl in the village, introduced herself as his mother, and handed him a piece of paper with her mobile number on it. Carl told nobody expect Angelica about the note and, the following day, he snuck out to meet Juliette. When Carl's absence was noticed, Jimmy and Nicola contacted the police and Angelica eventually revealed where Carl was. Juliette soon brought Carl home and told Jimmy and Nicola that, if they could not reach a compromise regarding access to Carl, she would not hesitate to involve solicitors. Whilst Jimmy refused to be threatened, Nicola was more sympathetic and, realising that Juliette had a genuine case, agreed to meet with her to discuss Carl. Jimmy was furious when he realised what Nicola had done, but soon came round when he realised that they couldn't keep Carl away from Juliette for good, especially now that Jimmy and Nicola had met.

Juliette's return, along with Jimmy's involvement in the crash that claimed the life of Paul Ashdale (Reece Dinsdale), placed a huge strain on Jimmy and Nicola's marriage and Juliette managed to convince them that Carl should stay with her as a temporary measure. However, a short time later, Juliette announced that motherhood had not been what she expected and that she was going to follow her new boyfriend to New York, leaving Carl behind. By this point, Jimmy and Nicola had agreed to separate, with Jimmy staying elsewhere, but with Carl confused and upset by Juliette's departure, it was agreed that Jimmy should move back in.

== Mark Bails ==
Mark Bails
- Emmerdale character
- Portrayed by: Rocky Marshall
- Duration: 2014–2015, 2018
- First appearance: Episode 6998; 14 October 2014
- Last appearance: Episode 8257; 12 September 2018
In-universe information
- Occupation: Detective Inspector
- Wife: Chloe Bails (until 2023)
- Sons: Ryan Stocks; Luke Bails
- Daughters: Molly Bails
- Grandsons: Oscar Grisham

DI Mark Bails, played by Rocky Marshall, made his first appearance on 14 October 2014. The character was brought back in 2018 as part of a storyline involving Tracy Metcalfe (Amy Walsh), before it was revealed that he had sexually abused and raped Charity Dingle (Emma Atkins) when she was 14 years old.

After Charity's ex-husband Declan Macey (Jason Merrells) implicates her in an insurance fraud, Bails believes he can secure a conviction and have her sent to prison. Charity doubts that Bails can prove anything, and tells him that she could lie on the stand that Declan threatened her son so she would provide him with an alibi. Bails then focuses his attentions on Pete Barton (Anthony Quinlan). He has photographic evidence of Pete dealing ecstasy and when he accuses Pete of supplying a girl with pills that ended up killing her, Pete is charged with manslaughter. Bails gets Pete's plea hearing postponed and then tells him that if he wants the charges to go away, Pete needs to convince Charity to confess to her involvement in the insurance fraud. Pete eventually tells Charity about Bails' threats. Charity reveals to Pete and her daughter Debbie Dingle (Charley Webb) that Bails used to abuse her and when she reported him for beating her up, his wife left him and he lost a promotion, which he blamed on Charity. She then goes to the police station and make a full confession. Charity is charged and sentenced to two years in prison.

Three years later, Bails begins working with Tracy on a police campaign to support sex workers. Charity tells her girlfriend Vanessa Woodfield (Michelle Hardwick) that Bails repeatedly raped her when she was 14 years old, after he picked her up for soliciting. Charity exposes Bails as a sex abuser at a press event for the police campaign, then a few months later Bails is found guilty of his crimes and consequently sentenced to 30 years imprisonment and is placed on the sex offenders register list for life. In February 2023, Charity receives a phone call notifying her of Bails' death of a heart attack and she and Cain Dingle (Jeff Hordley) drive to a cemetery and see his gravesite, confirming the fact. Charity then spits on the grave.

== Chrissie White ==
Chrissie White (also Sugden) is played by Louise Marwood. She made her first on-screen appearance on 23 October 2014. The character and casting was announced on 4 October 2014. Her storylines have included: her turbulent relationship and later marriage to Robert; being caught up in a raid at Home Farm organised by Robert; defending her teenage son Lachlan White (Thomas Atkinson) when it is revealed that he sexually assaulted Alicia Metcalfe (Natalie Anderson); discovering that Robert has been having an affair with Aaron Livesy (Danny Miller); causing a helicopter crash which killed multiple residents; discovering that Lawrence White (John Bowe) is not her biological father; embarking on a relationship with Robert's adoptive brother Andy Sugden (Kelvin Fletcher); pulling a sick stunt by destroying and fitting Andy up for Lawrence's attempted murder when Lachlan shoots him after discovering that Andy had cheated on her; and her intense feud with her younger sister Rebecca White (Emily Head). Chrissie made her final on-screen appearance on 11 January 2018, after being killed off in a car accident involving the entire White family.

== Lachlan White ==
Lachlan White
- Emmerdale character
- Portrayed by: Thomas Atkinson
- Duration: 2014–2019
- First appearance: Episode 7021; 10 November 2014
- Last appearance: Episode 8365; 11 January 2019
In-universe information
- Occupation: Student
- Father: Donny Cairn
- Mother: Chrissie White
- Stepfather: Robert Sugden
- Grandfathers: John Richards; Lawrence White (adoptive)
- Grandmothers: Ellen White
- Aunts: Rebecca White
- First cousins: Sebastian White
- Other relatives: Tim Richards

Lachlan White, played by Thomas Atkinson, made his first screen appearance on 10 November 2014. The character and casting was announced on 4 October 2014. Lachlan is Chrissie White's (Louise Marwood) son and he was described as being a "troubled 14-year-old". Atkinson took a break from the show between January 2017 until April 2017 due to his education; Lachlan made a full-time return on 20 April 2017. Atkinson made his final appearance on 19 September 2018. Atkinson reprised the role of Lachlan for a guest stint in January 2019.

Lachlan befriends Belle Dingle (Eden Taylor-Draper), but her strange behaviour causes others to think Lachlan has been harassing her. Lachlan photographs Belle and realises that something is wrong with her. He helps her realise that she needs help, as do her family. Lachlan also makes friends with Jacob Gallagher (Joe-Warren Plant) and spends time with him at his house. Jacob's mother, Alicia (Natalie Anderson), takes an interest in him as she can see he is a bit different. Chrissie is grateful for this but it soon becomes clear that Lachlan's interest in Alicia is inappropriate as shown when Chrissie finds that Lachlan has a lot of photos of Alicia. He claims that this is because he is helping Jacob make a photo book, which is true, and Jacob gives it to his mother as a present. Lachlan later buys Alicia an expensive handbag as a Valentine's present, making her husband, David Metcalfe (Matthew Wolfenden), wonder where it came from until Nicola King (Nicola Wheeler) tells him that she saw Lachlan with it. David tells Alicia and she returns it, letting him down gently, but Lachlan ignores it and David's warning to keep his distance. Believing Alicia returns his feelings, he sexually assaults her but a distraught Alicia throws him out of the house and calls the police. He initially tells the police that their relationship was consensual, leading her to be questioned about this. Chrissie initially believes him but later finds evidence that he is lying and on hearing Alicia's version of events, calls the police herself. She tells him and her father that Lachlan must take responsibility for what he has done.

After finishing his counselling, Lachlan begins suffering abuse from other students. He starts to blame Chrissie for ruining his reputation. Chrissie decides to get in contact with his father Donny Cairn (Alan Convy) in order to get through to him. Donny suggests to Lachlan that he lives with him in Scotland, to which Lachlan agrees. The next morning, Chrissie and her father Lawrence White (John Bowe) tell Lachlan that Donny had left to go abroad, when in fact he had been beaten up by loan sharks. After nearly being beaten up from other students and was saved by Alicia, Lachlan finally showed remorse and apologises to Alicia. A few weeks later, Lachlan goes to stay with Rebecca for a few weeks. He returns, aware of his mother's fiancé Robert Sugden's (Ryan Hawley) affair with Aaron Livesy (Danny Miller), and becomes resentful towards him. After Chrissie is arrested for causing the helicopter crash, Lachlan becomes determined to kill Robert and gets a gun from the safe. Lachlan walks with a gun around the village and is informed by Rakesh Kotecha (Pasha Bocarie). That evening, Robert is shot and left in a coma. After Lawrence confesses to attempted murder, Chrissie arranges Lachlan return to Rebecca for a few months. Upon his return, he and Lawrence's stepdaughter Gabby Thomas (Annelise Manojlovic) rob Eric Pollard's (Chris Chittell) house and steal his wife Val's (Charlie Hardwick) wedding ring, who was killed in the helicopter crash.

Lachlan supports Belle as she confides in him about her relationship with a married man, Dr. Jermaine Bailey (Micah Balfour). Fearing that Belle is being used by Dr. Bailey, Lachlan takes drastic action and trashes his house but Belle leaves her bag behind and is thus suspected of trashing the house herself. Belle confronts Lachlan about what he did and he lets slip that he is in love with her. In October 2016, Lachlan gets kidnapped by Aaron after Lachlan threatens to lie and tell everybody that Robert sexually abused him. Aaron and Robert took Lachlan to the quarry when he escape and Aaron and Robert chase him. Lachlan nearly pushes Aaron over but Robert grabs him. Lachlan tells Aaron that Robert used to sleep with his aunt Rebecca White (Emily Head), when he was engaged to Chrissie. Aaron and Robert put Lachlan back in the car boot. Later, Robert and Aaron have a chat when they see Ashley's wrecked car. Aaron avoids hitting the car but crashes into a lake. Robert rescues Aaron and went back for Lachlan who managed to make his own escape. Robert comes out of the lake and gets angry with Lachlan. Robert threatens Lachlan if Aaron dies, he will come after him however, Aaron survives. A week after, Lachlan lies to his family where he was, making them unaware that Lachlan was involved in the crash that killed James Barton (Bill Ward).

In November 2016, Lachlan finally confesses to the police that he shot Lawrence but conceals Chrissie's involvement in framing Andy. The Whites are in shock when they learn that Lachlan has been charged with attempted murder and perverting the course of justice. Whilst in prison, Lachlan meets his cell-mate Gerry Roberts (Shaun Thomas). Gerry then gives Lachlan a black eye, which makes Chrissie feel sorry for her son, so she gives Lachlan a Porsche when he is released, to make him feel better. When Lachlan visits Gerry in prison, he thanks him, as Chrissie will give Lachlan anything as she feels sorry for him. When Gerry is released he turns up at Home Farm and after making up a story to Chrissie, saying that his family are either in prison or in rehab, she agrees to let him stay for a few days. After Lachlan tells Gerry that he is yet to lose his virginity, Gerry arranges for him to have sex with a prostitute, for experience for when he sleeps with his girlfriend, Belle. However, Lachlan refuses to go through with the plan.

In summer 2017, Chrissie begins to manipulate Rakesh and while he is preparing to go on the run, he attempts to rob Home Farm, leading to a fight between him and Lachlan with Lachlan getting punched to the ground by Rakesh. During this confrontation, Rakesh's wife Priya Sharma (Fiona Wade) walks in and instead of calling the police, allows Rakesh to escape, telling him to try to be happy, however they are both unaware that Lachlan is listening to their every word. When the police arrive at the house they arrest Priya, after Lachlan informs them of what Priya said. Lachlan later goes missing after Belle breaks up with him, much to Chrissie's despair, however everyone is unaware that Lachlan is actually hiding in the attic and faking his disappearance to gain sympathy and until the Whites see Robert for what he really is. It later transpires that Robert has been manipulating the Whites, and following the revelation, Lachlan returns home.

In January 2018, having become tired of his family, Lachlan blackmails the Whites into getting him a place with Belle, or he will tell Robert that the family plans on moving to Australia with Rebecca and Robert's baby son, Seb. However, Lachlan is horrified when Belle breaks up with him. When he finds out it was Chrissie's doing, he goes to confront her, but he finds his family about to give chase to Robert in a car when he snatches Seb. Lachlan reluctantly joins them. While going down a country lane, Lachlan suffers a mental breakdown and tries grabbing the steering wheel, sending the car into the path of an oncoming lorry. The car overturns and crashes into a field, killing Lawrence instantly, as was not wearing a seatbelt trying to pull Lachlan away from the steering wheel. Chrissie is trapped in the front seat, and dies minutes later as a result of shock from blood loss. Rebecca also has a serious head injury but slips into a coma and is rushed to hospital. She is treated in the ICU. One month later, Rebecca wakes up from the coma and cannot remember anything about the crash. She suddenly remembers days later, but Lachlan manipulates her into believing that Chrissie lost control of the car. The nurses say to Robert that Rebecca's memory has been affected due to her head injury. Home Farm is signed over to Joe Tate (Ned Porteous) and Graham Foster (Andrew Scarborough) following the crash. After Rebecca is discharged from hospital, she moves in with Victoria Barton (Isabel Hodgins) and Lachlan moves in with the Dingle family at Wishing Well Cottage.

Belle and Lachlan begin a company they named Whingles Ale, operating it out of a barn of Wishing Well Cottage using a starter kit. They recruit Priya to help sell the product, and Gerry to help with the making and advertising of the product. In May 2018, Belle goes missing so he and Gerry go looking for her, as Lachlan becomes increasingly worried he says he doesn't want anyone else to die because of him, Gerry takes notice of this and becomes suspicious, so he makes it his priority to find the incriminating voicemail Lachlan sent him the day of the crash. He eventually recovers it and is horrified to hear the crash unfold. He later confronts Lachlan to which Lachlan tells him not to tell anyone. As Lachlan becomes increasingly worried that Gerry will let his secret slip as Gerry makes jokes relating to the crash, he lures Gerry to the B&B which was under renovation and tells him to go over to get one of the beer kegs which Lachlan had moved. Gerry does and Lachlan kicks a barrel into the support column, knocking it down and bringing the roof with it. Gerry is crushed by debris, whilst Lachlan narrowly avoids getting crushed. However, Gerry survived, and, despite his pleas, Lachlan hits Gerry over the head with a rock, killing him.

Lachlan allows Gerry's friend Doug Potts (Duncan Preston) to take the blame. However, he tries to reassure Doug that Gerry's death was not his fault, all the while keeping his role in Gerry's death secret. Doug was found guilty of manslaughter and sentenced to community service. A man arrives, claiming to be Gerry's uncle, Terry. He threatened to sue Doug but Doug took care of him and Terry dropped the charges. However, Lachlan caught the Terry (who at this point was revealed to be a conman) robbing The Grange. When Terry revealed he had seen Gerry's incriminating drawings, a fight ensued but Terry got away. Lachlan and Belle stormed into a meeting between Priya and potential client Freddy. Freddy was unimpressed and pulled his investment but Belle gave him a talking to. Belle was offered a job in London, however Lachlan was furious to discover he wouldn't be able to see Belle for a year. After celebrating Belle's job offer in The Woolpack, Priya gets Lachlan to drive her home. Instead, Lachlan follows Freddy to a nearby hotel and sneaks up behind him with a rock, intending to cave his head in. However, he is interrupted with a call from Belle and is shocked to turn around and see a frightened Priya run into a taxi. His fears were put to rest though, as Priya confronted Lachlan with her beliefs that he was about to sexually assault her. Belle stood up for Lachlan and, as a result, Priya quit her job.

Lachlan began receiving anonymous text messages, and assumed Terry had managed to obtain his number. Worried about the conman revealing his secret, Lachlan went to lengths to try track him down – going around the funeral homes to see if he could find Terry. Eventually, he had success and followed the man in his car. He caught up and killed Terry, burying his body in the Home Farm woods. After the Terry's death, Lachlan was confused and horrified when the texts continued. He discovered that Liv Flaherty (Isobel Steele) was the culprit and caused a carbon monoxide leak in Mill Cottage. Lachlan realized that Seb may have been inside the house and goes to look for him, and is relieved to discover Robert had asked Diane to look after him. However, on his way out, Lachlan bumped into Liv. Liv became suspicious of Lachlan but Lachlan shoved her, causing her to head her head on a plug point, and left her unconscious in the gassed house. Leaving the property, he encountered Rebecca who did not realise Seb was with Diane. Lachlan told her Seb was with Diane and was insistent that she could not enter, scaring Rebecca who ran past and found Robert and Liv unconscious. Lachlan then grabs a terrified Rebecca and her fate is left unknown. Later, Aaron returned home and rung an ambulance. Robert not Liv could remember what happened, but Liv was insistent that Lachlan caused the leak. Liv was forced to keep quiet when Lachlan claimed he did not know anything, and Aaron and Robert told her to drop it.

Rebecca is later revealed to be alive and Lachlan had held her hostage in one of the huts on the Glamping Site. Rebecca pleads with Lachlan to let her go and offered to move away with Seb. Lachlan didn't trust her and refused to let her go, however Rebecca managed to break free and hit Lachlan over the head with a pan. Lachlan awoke and a foot chase ensued, resulting in Lachlan tripping and falling down a bank. Distracted by the sight of an unconscious Lachlan, Rebecca tripped and knocked herself out, and Lachlan regained consciousness. Eventually, Rebecca woke up back at the hut and pretended to have forgotten everything this year, but Lachlan saw through her facade and began to suffocate her.

Lachlan managed to make it look like Rebecca had fled to Wales to stay with friends without any sort of warning. He managed to get Rebecca's memory book so nobody would try find it. However, Lydia Hart (Karen Blick) found it in Lachlan's possession and Lachlan spun her a web of lies about how he held onto it to remember her. Robert was unconvinced that she would leave Seb and made attempts to try find her, but to no avail. Lachlan seemed out of the woods until new Home Farm owner Joe hired Priya, and Priya pitched an idea to Joe about how the old glamping site could be used. Lachlan began becoming wary of Priya's presence and when she discovered some writing Rebecca had carved into the wall that read "LACHLAN IS A KILLER", he attempted to scratch it out. He was nearly caught by Priya, and he quickly lied that he was going for a jog. Priya discovered the writing and a desperate Lachlan burnt down the hut. Priya rang the police but they found a bloody rock, with the blood coming back as belonging to Terry. Lachlan caught wind of the fact that it had become a murder investigation and quickly dug up the body.

Lachlan tried to bury Terry's body in the garden of Wishing Well Cottage. However, unknown to him, Belle's half-brother Sam (James Hooton) had returned home and caught Lachlan burying Terry's body. In his desperation, Lachlan beats Sam and leaves him unconscious and bleeding behind the bar inside. Belle discovered blood on Lachlan's jersey and caught Lachlan out on his lies. He revealed that it was Sam's blood and Belle found her brother severely beaten behind the bar – seeing Lachlan's true colours. Lachlan begged for Belle to leave with him, telling her she could call an ambulance on the way. However, he was disturbed by someone at the door – Robert. He hid from Lachlan upon realising he was armed and managed to sneak into the house. He tried to help Belle escape but Lachlan walked in and caught him, tying him to a chair and smashing his phone. Lachlan then confesses to causing the crash that killed his mother and grandfather, as well as murdering Gerry and Paul. As Lachlan insists that he loves Belle and wanted to keep them together, Robert managed to untie himself and made a dive for the gun – resulting in a scuffle that caused the gun to go off, slightly injuring Lachlan and alerting Belle's father Zak Dingle (Steve Halliwell) and brother Cain Dingle (Jeff Hordley). However, when the pair made it to the farmhouse, Belle and Lachlan had gone and Zak rang an ambulance for Sam and police for Lachlan – with Cain and Robert in pursuit of Lachlan and Belle.

Lachlan broke into the flat he and Belle were purchasing and kept Belle captive in the house. Belle told Lachlan that Cain had a friend who could get them fake passports and possibly her schizophrenia medication so they could skip the country, but Lachlan became suspicious when she suddenly became nice to him. Belle lied that she was pregnant and she got into the car. However, Belle quickly locked the doors before Lachlan could get in but the car cut out when Belle was reversing. Lachlan caught up and Belle swung open the door, bashing Lachlan's leg where he had been injured by the gunshot wound. She made a run for it, and he went into pursuit, finally catching up to her. He confronted her and realised that Belle had been playing him since the revelation, and began to believe Belle didn't really love him. When Belle runs off, Lachlan goes in pursuit, but trips and fires the gun, making Belle go even faster in the opposite direction. He eventually made it onto the road where he was horrified to find that she had been hit by Robert's car and accused Robert of running Belle over for revenge. He tried to awaken Belle but armed officers arrived as well as an ambulance and Lachlan was arrested.

Lachlan demands to know if Belle is alright, but DI Cox refuses to disclose any information about her condition. Knowing there is a search out for Rebecca, Lachlan tells DI Cox that he will disclose Rebecca's whereabouts if he is allowed to see Belle. Months later, Belle finds a number of items, including dead flowers and a birthday card, on her doorstep and automatically assumes Lachlan is behind them. After Gloria the pig is killed, she arranges a visit with Lachlan to find out what he is up to. It emerges that Lachlan has promised his father Donny money to intimidate and get revenge on the Dingles.

It is unknown what Lachlan was facing but it seems Lachlan was possibly charged with: four counts of murder, grievous bodily harm, kidnapping, false imprisonment, possession of an illegal firearm and other charges including: conspiracy to arson, attempted murder, assaulting a police officer and perverting the course of justice. Lachlan is then sentenced to life in prison.

== Other characters ==
Date(s)	Character	Actor	Circumstances
11–20 February	Anton Bluth	Andrew Dowbiggin	Bernice Blackstock (Samantha Giles) meets Anton online, but while on a date with him, Anton handcuffs Bernice to a bed in Jimmy (Nick Miles) and Nicola King's (Nicola Wheeler) house, before robbing the place and fleeing. Bernice talks Nicola into helping her spring a trap for Anton; Nicola dons a disguise and the sisters head to a speed dating event, where as they had hoped, they spot Anton trying to meet other women who he can dupe. Nicola flirts with him and they arrange a date. Bernice watches from a safe distance. Nicola panics when Anton suggests they go back to her place and locks herself in a toilet cubicle. Bernice comes in and knocks Anton out, she then handcuffs him to a toilet and takes his picture.
21–27 February	Mark	Chris Lindon	Mark approaches Jai Sharma (Chris Bisson) with information about Rachel Breckle (Gemma Oaten) and his son, Archie's whereabouts. Mark asks Jai for money before giving him the information.
7 March	Laura Atkinson	Farrel Hegarty	Laura is a brief "girlfriend" of Ross Barton (Michael Parr). Sarah takes a shine to Laura and promises to paint her nails for her.
1–5 May	Tiny Alcock	Tony Pritchard	Tiny is a delivery driver who goes on several dates with Val Pollard (Charlie Hardwick). When Val admits that she is HIV positive, Tiny gets extremely angry and begins shouting at Val, hitting her to the floor in disgust. He confronts her husband, Eric (Chris Chittell), furious that he did not tell him she was HIV positive. Eric becomes aware that Tiny hit Val and confronts him in the village. Tiny begins insulting Val, causing Eric to try and punch him. Tiny puts Eric in a headlock and Val scratches his van as the police arrive. She is arrested from criminal damage. Eric kicks and punches Tiny and is subsequently arrested for assault. The café and David Metcalfe's (Matthew Wolfenden) shop cancel their bread orders because of Tiny's behaviour.
29 May–2 June	Laurent	Alexander Devrient	Laurent is a French cyclist, who falls off his bike when Kerry Wyatt (Laura Norton) steps into his path. Kerry apologises and invites Laurent to stay at her house, when she becomes worried that he will sue her. Shortly before Laurent is due to leave, he kisses Kerry, but she rejects him.
22–24 July	Brad	Jaz Martin	Brad arrives in the village looking for Finn Barton (Joe Gill). He later attempts to murder Finn on orders from Gary North (Fergus O'Donnell).
22 July	Kev Berry	Christopher Connel	Kev gatecrashes Kerry Wyatt's (Laura Norton) wedding reception and reveals that he and Kerry are married. A fight breaks out between Kev, Kerry, Kerry's new husband Dan Spencer (Liam Fox) and Dan's brother Daz Spencer (Mark Jordon). The police then arrive and Kev, Kerry, Dan and Daz are all arrested. Kerry is arrested and charged for bigamy, while Kev, Dan and Daz are all arrested for affray.
