= Alicia Gallagher =

Fictional character from Emmerdale

- Emmerdale character
- Portrayed by: Natalie Anderson
- Duration: 2010–2015
- First appearance: 11 August 2010
- Last appearance: 10 September 2015
- Introduced by: Gavin Blyth
In-universe information
- Other names: Alicia Harding; Alicia Metcalfe
- Occupation: Barmaid; Shop assistant Businesswoman
- Mother: Yvonne Harding
- Sisters: Leyla Harding
- Husband: Justin Gallagher (until 2012); David Metcalfe (2012–2013, 2013–2015)
- Adoptive sons: Jacob Gallagher
- Stepdaughters: Amba Metcalfe

Alicia Metcalfe (also Harding and Gallagher) is a fictional character from the British ITV soap opera Emmerdale, played by Natalie Anderson. She made her first screen appearance during the episode broadcast on 11 August 2010. Alicia was introduced as the sister of established character Leyla Harding (Roxy Shahidi). On 24 May 2015, it was announced that Anderson had quit the show and Alicia made her final on-screen appearance on 10 September 2015.

== Casting ==
On 23 May 2010, it was announced that Anderson had joined the cast of Emmerdale as Alicia, the estranged sister of established character Leyla Harding (Roxy Shahidi). Of her casting, Anderson commented "I'm absolutely thrilled to be joining the show. It'll be wonderful to be working back home in Yorkshire again. I'm a Yorkshire girl so a part in Emmerdale is a dream come true!" Anderson revealed that she had known the series producer for a long time and had previously auditioned for a role in another soap opera in front of him, so when the part of Alicia came up he thought of her and asked her to audition. Series producer Gavin Blyth stated that Anderson was "a wonderful addition to the cast" and said Alicia would stir things up in Leyla's life from the minute she arrives. Anderson initially signed a six-month contract and began filming in June. She made her screen debut as Alicia in August.

== Development ==
=== Characterisation ===
Upon her introduction, Alicia was described as being "in-your-face" and "trashy" by Steve Hendry from the Sunday Mail. Anderson told the reporter, "She's bold and she's brassy and she does have quite a hard exterior. She is an extremely protective alpha-female. She is like a lioness of her pride, she will protect her family from anything." The actress said Alicia can display a vulnerable side and she was hoping that after a few episodes, viewers would get to see why she is the way she is. She also explained that there are many levels to Alicia and despite her initial appearance, she is anything but a bimbo. Alicia was not happy to see her estranged sister, Leyla, but Anderson did not think Alicia hated Leyla. She said "Alicia is the older, more dominant sister who has the potential to spoil everything Leyla has created in the village." A writer for the show's official website described Alicia as being spontaneous, hard-working and driven. A What's on TV writer called Alicia "a brazen, spiteful, mouthy barmaid".

Anderson worked closely with the make-up and wardrobe teams to make Alicia look "as extreme as possible." Alicia's distinctive look consists of fake tan, long nails, hair extensions and much gold jewellery. She also often wears high heels and mini skirts. Anderson also wore extra-padded bras to make her breasts look bigger. Anderson thought Alicia saw herself as glamorous, but said that her idea of glamorous and Alicia's were very different. The actress told Hendry that Alicia was not based on anyone in particular, but a type of girl who is often seen hanging around the city centre. She added that Alicia was quite unlike herself and she was excited to be seen in a different light. Katie Begley from the Daily Star observed that Alicia was a wannabe WAG.

=== Family ===
Alicia was introduced along with her husband, Justin (Andrew Langtree), and their son, Jacob (Joe Warren-Plant). Anderson told Digital Spy's Daniel Kilkelly that Alicia dotes on her son and "loves him to pieces", but things between her and her husband were strained when they first arrived. Anderson called Alicia "a strong family woman", who wanted to be a good wife and mother. Alicia came to the village to warn her sister, Leyla, not to attend their recently deceased mother's funeral. Anderson thought her character would be disliked straight away because of her introduction. Leyla ignored Alicia's warning and turned up at the funeral, where the two sisters had "a screaming match" at each other. Alicia was annoyed with Leyla, but Anderson said she respected that it was Leyla's mother too and she had a right to be there. When asked what had caused the issue, Anderson explained "All I can really say is that something has definitely gone on between them! What it is will be revealed in the next few weeks. The biggest clue I can give is that Alicia is fiercely protective of her family unit and she doesn't want anything to come between that. So you can read into that what you want!"

Anderson added that Alicia does not want to cause trouble, but she does not want her sister around. The actress hoped that viewers could see that despite the bad blood between them, the sisters were close and that they did love each other. It later emerged that Leyla was the biological mother of Jacob, not Alicia. Shahidi thought Leyla just wanted to be Jacob's aunt and treat him like anyone would treat their nephew. The actress also believed that Alicia would definitely be worried that Leyla would want to play a bigger part in Jacob's life because she is his biological mother. Shahidi said that it is something the two sisters would have to sort out for themselves. In October 2013, Alicia was forced to tell Jacob that she was not his mother, as she believed Priya Sharma (Fiona Wade) was going to do it instead. While attending a Halloween party, Alicia noticed Priya getting drunk and became worried, so she decided to tell Jacob the truth. Speaking to a What's on TV reporter, Anderson admitted that the scene was heartbreaking for her to film. She continued "This woman has looked after this little boy for 10 years and has to tell him she's not his mum. He cries his eyes out." Alicia's worst fear then came true when Jacob ran away.

=== Andy Sugden ===
Following a brief fling with Declan Macey (Jason Merrells), Alicia had a relationship with Andy Sugden (Kelvin Fletcher). Alicia learned all about Andy's troubled past and told her sister that it was ancient history as far as she was concerned. Anderson told Kate Woodward from Inside Soap that Alicia could pack a punch and Andy had one chance, so if he blew it, Alicia would be off. Anderson explained that Alicia really liked that Andy was down-to-earth and just wanted to have a family, work on the farm and come home for his tea. She said Alicia shared the same sentiments and did not have big ambitions. Fletcher and Anderson came up with the idea of Alicia being a fan of pop group Take That and so Andy buys Alicia tickets to see them live. Anderson said Alicia was flattered by the gift and loved that Andy had thought of her. Andy and Alicia's relationship went through a rough patch when Andy offered to loan Alicia some money and then tried to get her a job at the local veterinary surgery.

Anderson told Woodward, "Alicia is an incredibly proud person and thinks she's confided in Andy alone about her situation. So the fact he's gone behind her back and talked about her problems with other people makes her absolutely furious." Alicia was hurt that Andy had taken her confidential worries to someone else. Anderson hoped the couple would be able to work out their issues and get their relationship back on track. Alicia later became involved in the show's saviour sibling storyline, which saw Andy agree to have another baby with Debbie Dingle (Charley Webb) in a bid to save his sick daughter Sarah Sugden Jr. (Sophia Amber Moore). Alicia tried to be supportive, but her feelings surrounding her own infertility made it hard for her to deal with her boyfriend having a baby with someone else. Anderson stated that Alicia was aware of how ill Sarah was, but there was a point at which she would have to make "a huge decision" about her relationship with Andy.

=== Financial problems ===
When Justin began spoiling Jacob, Alicia felt that like she could not compete, which upset her. Alicia did not have enough money coming in to meet the demands of a seven-year-old. Deciding that she needed to give Jacob the perfect birthday, Alicia began stealing from Leyla's shop. Alicia stole cigarettes and alcohol from the stockroom and sold them on. Anderson explained that Alicia resorts to stealing because of a gift Justin sent to Jacob, which she knows will be great. During the burglary, David Metcalfe (Matthew Wolfenden) and Leyla hear a noise, but Alicia has gone by the time they investigate. Alicia's financial worries affected her relationship with her sister and things became strained between them. Alicia was forced to admit to stealing from the shop when Leyla accused employee Amy Wyatt (Chelsea Halfpenny) of committing the thefts. Alicia begged Leyla for forgiveness and admitted to stealing so she could buy Jacob presents. However, Leyla was "furious" and ordered her sister to pack her bags and leave her house.

Alicia and Jacob went to stay with Andy, who made it clear that it was not a permanent arrangement. He was also shocked that Alicia had resorted to stealing from the shop. The sisters eventually called a truce, after Leyla asked Andy to convince Alicia to come back home. Leyla missed Jacob and found it hard to cope without him around. Andy became curious about Alicia and Leyla's relationship and he pressed Alicia for more information. A show spokesperson commented "She really struggles to talk openly about the situation with Andy. But he's insistent – they can't have any secrets if their relationship has a hope in hell of working." Alicia then admitted that she was not Jacob's biological mother. Andy was shocked by the news, but glad that she had confided in him. Alicia also revealed that she felt huge pressure to compete with Leyla and Justin to be a good parent and Andy realised how much Alicia had been hurting. Meanwhile, David was unhappy that Leyla had apologised to Alicia about their argument and worried that if Alicia moved back in, there could be trouble and they could fall out again.

=== Temporary departure ===
On 19 March 2012, Anderson announced that she was four-and-a-half months pregnant, and joked that she would have to conceal her bump on-screen with large handbags and by standing behind the bar, before going on maternity leave. Alicia was temporarily written out of the show and her exit storyline saw her sent to prison, after she punched Val Pollard (Charlie Hardwick) in the face. Of learning about the storyline, Anderson said "When I told the show I was pregnant I had no idea what they were going to do. I had absolutely no say and, to be honest, I really thought they would say, 'She's gone off in a taxi to see her sister', something really normal, and that would be that. Then this elaborate story came about with a previous conviction and I was going, 'thank you'. I just thought it was brilliant. It's really good fun and comic in a lot of ways. I felt privileged they had thought of it that way." The actress was six-and-a-half months pregnant when she filmed Alicia's exit. The storyline began with Alicia declaring her love for David Metcalfe (Matthew Wolfenden). After Val interrupted, Alicia ended up punching her. When Val reported her to the police, it emerged that Alicia had broken the terms of a previous suspended sentence and she was sent to prison. Before she went, Alicia married David, so he could look after Jacob for her. Alicia returned on 18 December 2012, while Anderson signed a new one-year contract.

=== Dom Andrews ===
In June 2013, Alicia began dating village newcomer Dom Andrews (Wil Johnson), despite still harbouring feelings for David. Johnson told Digital Spy's Daniel Kilkelly that Dom liked Alicia "a lot" and wanted to make a go of things with her. He was unaware of how deep Alicia's feelings were for David, as he did not know about her history. He commented "It's been quite a slow process with Dom and Alicia, and I think that's because Dom also has to protect himself because of his own history." Dom's teenage daughter Gemma (Tendai Rinomhota) did not approve of Alicia, who quickly realised that she was "a daddy's girl". When Dom found a positive pregnancy test in his home, he assumed it belonged to Gemma. However, Alicia surprised them both when she claimed the pregnancy test belonged to her. Dom later asked Alicia to move in with him and Gemma, but she did not react well. When asked if Dom and Alicia should be together, Johnson replied that they should as they are right for other. He added "Time will tell if their hearts are truly committed to each other."

=== Departure ===
On 24 May 2015, it was announced that Anderson would leave Emmerdale at the end of her contract in the latter half of 2015. On-screen, Alicia had been sexually attacked by teenager Lachlan White (Thomas Atkinson) and he had only recently confessed to the crime. Alicia persisted on a new start with David and Jacob in Portugal. Speaking of her decision, Anderson said "I've had the most incredible five years at Emmerdale and made some wonderful friends. I'm so grateful to the writers, directors, producers and everyone I've worked with. This year has been such a highlight and so amazing that I felt now was the right time to say bye to Alicia and see what the future holds." On 3 June, Alicia, David and Jacob were seen leaving the village for Portugal, but it was later confirmed that this was not Alicia's final exit scenes. A show spokesperson explained that Anderson's departure would air later in the year. Anderson revealed her reason behind quitting the soap on Lorraine, stating that she left to spend more time with her three-year-old son, Freddie, ""To be honest, the main thing was my little boy. I went back to work really early after I had him... he was 11 weeks old when I went back to work." She continued to state how the show's filming schedule proved too much for her, especially when she would "go a week" without seeing her son. It had also recently been revealed that Alicia would leave without her husband David. Alicia's exit scenes aired on 10 September 2015.

== Storylines ==
Alicia comes to the village to warn her sister Leyla to stay away from their mother's funeral. Leyla attends anyway and Alicia tells her not to expect a reconciliation. Alicia returns when her marriage to Justin breaks down and she argues with Leyla, revealing that she adopted Leyla's son, Jacob. Their mother had persuaded Leyla to allow Alicia to adopt him as Alicia is infertile. Leyla asks Alicia and Jacob to move in with her and her boyfriend, David Metcalfe, and Alicia gets a job in The Woolpack. When Jacob has an allergic reaction to some nuts, Alicia accuses Leyla of neglecting him. She also feuds with Chas Dingle (Lucy Pargeter) and Eve Jenson (Suzanne Shaw). Alicia flirts with Nathan Wylde (Lyndon Ogbourne) and Leyla warns Alicia not to trust him. Alicia also flirts with Declan Macey and he invites her to a housewarming party at Home Farm. Alicia and Declan flirt as he shows her around and he invites her upstairs, but his ex-wife and his daughter arrive and Alicia leaves. After an argument with her ex-husband, Alicia meets Declan at The Woolpack and they have a drink together, before she goes home with him.

Leyla and Alicia argue about Jacob and her going out at night, but Jacob overhears them. Alicia soon discovers that Jacob has run away and blames Leyla, but Justin blames her. The police are called in and Alicia gives a press conference. Justin tells Alicia that he is Jacob's biological father and Leyla admits they had a one-night stand. David finds Jacob in an abandoned building and comforts him as he is taken to hospital. Alicia refuses to give Justin access to Jacob and he threatens to go for custody, but Leyla defends Alicia. Alicia is furious when Justin collects Jacob from school without informing her. She reveals her fear that Jacob will hate her as a result of Justin spoiling him. Leyla tells Alicia that she should not stop Justin seeing Jacob, as Jacob misses him. Alicia later calls Justin and agrees that he can have access to their son. Alicia begins dating Andy Sugden. When she suffers financial problems, Andy offers her a loan, but she refuses to take his money. Andy then tries to get her a job at the veterinary surgery, but she tells him not to interfere in her life.

When Andy and Debbie Dingle find out that their daughter needs a bone marrow transplant, they decide to conceive a saviour sibling. Alicia supports Andy, but is dismayed when he and Debbie have sex to conceive the baby. Alicia struggles with the situation and she and Andy break up. Alicia turns to David for support and she moves back in with him. Although David views their friendship as platonic, Alicia finds herself developing feelings for him. When Val Pollard berates David for allowing her husband to begin a new relationship, Alicia becomes angry and punches Val. Val reports her to the police and Alicia is charged with assault. It emerges that Alicia has a prior conviction for assault and has a suspended sentence. Worried that Justin will take Jacob, David suggests to Alicia that they marry so he can be Jacob's guardian. Alicia agrees and they marry. She then admits her true feelings to David, but he tells her he does not feel the same. Alicia is then sentenced to a year in prison.

When Alicia is released from prison, she is upset to learn that David is now dating Priya Sharma. Weeks later Alicia begins dating Dominic Andrews, although his daughter, Gemma, does not like her. Alicia realises her true feelings for David and goes to his house to tell him, but Priya answers the door and tells a stunned Alicia that the couple are now engaged. This devastates Alicia, but she soon has to concentrate on her new family with Dom when he discovers that Gemma is pregnant. Gemma confides in Alicia about her mother walking out on her and Dom, the pregnancy and her feud with Belle Dingle (Eden Taylor-Draper). During a siege in The Woolpack, Cameron Murray holds several residents hostage, including Alicia, David and Priya. Alicia is accidentally shot by Cameron and she starts to succumb to her injury, before Cameron allows David to take her out of the pub. Alicia is rushed to hospital where she is treated and later resuscitated. David and Alicia admit their feelings for one another and they begin a relationship, which devastates Priya and Dom. Believing Priya will tells Jacob that she is not his mother, Alicia and David sit him down and tell him the truth. Jacob is upset and runs away to stay with Priya. Alicia and David soon get engaged and immediately book a Christmas wedding. After a few incidents before the wedding, Alicia and David marry. On the same day, Leyla returns and the sisters argue. Leyla tells Alicia that her boss is calling her and is working as a recruitment consultant. Alicia doesn't believe the story and finds out that Leyla is actually impersonating her as a stripper. Leyla and Alicia have a heart to heart and with the realisation that Leyla isn't coping, she lets her sister stay in her house.

The following year, Alicia is sexually assaulted by Lachlan White after he misunderstands her friendliness for affection. The ordeal causes Alicia to breakdown. When Val's son, Paul, offers her and David to run a bar with him in Lisbon, they accept. David and Alicia leave the village. David makes a return when Eric has a heart attack. Alicia joins him, after Val is killed in an explosion. Alicia and David try to console a grieving Eric, but Alicia tells David that she wants to return to Portugal. However, David refuses and reveals that he bought the shop and needs to be there for his father. Realising they want different things, Alicia and David break up and she leaves for Portugal the next day. Alicia then files for a divorce.

== Reception ==
In 2015, Anderson was nominated for Best Actress at the British Soap Awards. When Alicia arrived, Katie Begley from the Daily Star commented "If Emmerdale suddenly finds itself facing a shortage of push-up bras, fake tan and hair extensions then we know exactly who to blame – brassy newcomer Alicia Gallagher." Kerry Barrett from All About Soap branded Alicia a "mouthy mum" and said she could not help feel sorry for her, as she is "desperately" in love with David. When Alicia was shot, Barrett's colleague Mark James Lowe quipped "Our hearts were in our mouths as we watched the docs desperately trying to resuscitate poor Alicia. Is it only us who thought she was a goner for a moment there?"
