= Leyla Harding =

Fictional character from Emmerdale

- Emmerdale character
- Portrayed by: Roxy Shahidi
- Duration: 2008–2011, 2013–2025
- First appearance: 11 August 2008
- Last appearance: 6 March 2025
- Introduced by: Keith Richardson (2008); Kate Oates (2013)
In-universe information
- Other names: Leyla Cavanagh
- Occupation: Packer; Shop assistant Shopkeeper; Businesswoman; Events planner
- Mother: Yvonne Harding
- Sisters: Alicia Gallagher
- Husband: Liam Cavanagh (2021–2023)
- Sons: Jacob Gallagher
- Stepdaughters: Leanna Cavanagh
- Granddaughters: Leyla Sugden (adoptive)

Leyla Harding (also Cavanagh) is a fictional character from the British ITV soap opera Emmerdale, played by Roxy Shahidi. She made her first on-screen appearance on 11 August 2008 and was introduced by series producer, Anita Turner. The character departed on 5 August 2011. Shahidi returned to Emmerdale for two episodes on 25 December 2013. She returned full-time in January 2014. On 5 January 2018, Shahadi took maternity leave from the show whilst pregnant with her first child. She returned on 3 October 2018. In October 2024, it was announced that Shahidi would be leaving the soap and Leyla was killed-off in the episode broadcast on 19 February 2025, following a limousine crash.

== Casting ==
In July 2008, the Prestwich Advertiser reported that actress Roxy Shahidi had joined the cast of Emmerdale as Leyla Harding. Shahidi signed an initial six-month contract. She said of her casting: "I've been filming for two weeks now and it's great. [...] I've done a lot of theatre but not much TV work up to now so it's great for me to work on such a popular and well established show. It's a dream come true in fact." Shahidi later said that she was "so excited", commenting: "This is a brilliant opportunity for me as I've done lots of theatre but not much TV. Everyone at Emmerdale has been so warm and welcoming. It's such a well-established show and I can't wait to see what Leyla gets up to." Emmerdale series producer Anita Turner added, "Rokhsaneh is a terrific actress and an exciting new addition to the cast. Leyla's going to have some fun stirring up the factory."

== Development ==
=== Characterisation ===
Leyla is slightly ditzy but a fun loving, loyal girl. She's easily led which can get her into trouble, but she's finally achieved her dream of buying the old farm shop, and is settling down with David at Farrers Barn. She's funny but often gets laughed at.

— itv.com.

Leyla is described as "streetwise" and "savvy". Shahidi described her as "very down to earth", "very lovable" and "really ballsy". Leyla was initially a new worker at Eric Pollard's (Chris Chittell) factory and it was said that she would immediately get on the right side of him. Leyla is reluctant to talk about her past, which sparks speculation about why she has moved to the village. Channel Five's soap opera reporting website Holy Soap describe Leyla as a "naive, honest, hard worker who can sometimes be a bit too trusting of people". What's on TV deemed her an "attractive woman". Shahidi told the Daily Mirror that she and Leyla are "quite similar in some ways" saying "We're both pretty ditsy and we have the same sense of fun. Leyla says things without thinking, and I can do that too." She added that their lives and relationships are very different because she and Leyla are "worlds apart".

=== Relationship with David Metcalfe ===
Leyla begins a relationship with Eric's son, David Metcalfe (Matthew Wolfenden). In October 2009, Leyla sleeps with her new boss, Nathan Wylde (Lyndon Ogbourne). However, when she admits that she regrets cheating on David, Nathan warns that he will not let her forget what happened and begins a "campaign of manipulation". Of the plot, Ogbourne told the Press Association: "The switch between being such a seemingly nice guy and the malicious way he's controlling Leyla is quite horrific." He added that Nathan would get "worse and worse" and could "easily fit into the cast of American Psycho by the end of it". Leyla then fears that Nathan will tell David the truth. Shahidi said this causes Leyla to be "under a lot of stress". However, Leyla confesses to David. Leyla and David later reconcile. Wolfenden said he believes that Leyla is the "right woman" for David, despite "all of the things she has done to him". He said "David seems to be under the thumb, and Leyla gets away with cheating, stealing and having a secret son. But David has been good enough to put that to one side, so because of that I reckon she must be the right girl for him."

=== Family ===
In May 2010, Digital Spy reported that Leyla's sister, Alicia Gallagher (Natalie Anderson), would be introduced. The website said Alicia arrives in the village and makes it clear that she has unfinished business with Leyla. Leyla and Alicia's relationship is "far from perfect". Leyla is forced to deal with Alicia's arrival in an attempt to keep her "murky and scandal-ridden" past buried. Anderson said that Alicia was set to make life quite complicated for Leyla. Emmerdale series producer Gavin Blyth added that Alicia will start stirring things up in Leyla's life the minute she sets foot in the village. Alicia arrives in the village to warn Leyla that she does not want her at their mother's funeral. However, Leyla ignores Alicia and they "have a bit of a screaming match" at the funeral, which leaves Alicia annoyed. Discussing what caused the "bad blood" between Alicia and Leyla in an interview with Digital Spy, Anderson said, "All I can really say is that something has definitely gone on between them! [...] The biggest clue I can give is that Alicia is fiercely protective of her family unit and she doesn't want anything to come between that. So you can read into that what you want!" Anderson said that Alicia does not want to cause trouble, but does not want Leyla around. Anderson added that Alicia would "prefer it if [Leyla] just disappeared". Alicia was introduced along with her husband, Justin (Andrew Langtree), and their son, Jacob (Joe-Warren Plant).

In September 2010, it was revealed that Leyla is the biological mother of Jacob. Shahidi said that she was "really shocked" when she learned about the storyline, but was also excited as she thought it would be "really interesting" to play. She opined that the storyline would bring a new dimension to Leyla. Shahidi was involved in Warren-Plant's casting as Jacob. Shahidi admitted that she was surprised that Leyla had not seen Jacob for so long, but understood as Leyla wanted to get on with her life and escape her past. Shahidi said that Leyla just wants to be Jacob's aunt. Leyla wants to see Jacob and interact with him like a normal aunt and nephew. Shahidi had previously said that Leyla kept the secret as she wanted to get on with her life. Shahidi also said that the easiest way for Leyla to move on in her life was to ignore it.

Leyla takes Jacob to a birthday party, where he goes into anaphylactic shock due to an allergic reaction to some cake. Speaking about the plot, Shahidi commented: "It's Leyla's fault because she hasn't listened to her sister's warnings about not letting Jacob eat anything because of his nut allergy." Shahidi added that if Leyla had listened to Alicia, it could have been avoided. The situation shocks Leyla and makes her realise that Alicia is Jacob's mother and needs to be listened to. Shahidi said that Leyla needs to learn to be "less full-on" and stop "indulging and spoiling" Jacob.

=== Departure (2011) ===
In June 2011, the Daily Star Sunday reported that Shahidi was to leave Emmerdale. Speaking to the newspaper, Shahidi confirmed: "I have had an amazing three years at Emmerdale and it has been a really tough decision to leave." She filmed her final scenes as Leyla later that month. Shahidi admitted to We Love Telly that it took her six months to reach the decision to leave the show. The actress explained that Anderson helped her reach the decision as she has experience of leaving a long-running serial. Shahidi said that viewers would see a "desperate" side to Leyla in the build-up to her departure.

=== Reintroduction (2013) ===
Leyla returned to Emmerdale during the episode broadcast on 25 December 2013. Shahidi revealed that when she received the call from producer Kate Oates about coming back, it came at the "perfect time." She was initially in talks about coming back earlier, but the play she was appearing extended its run. She continued, "I went away from that not knowing whether Leyla was coming back, but then when Kate got in touch with this Christmas Day storyline, it just felt like fate because it was a much better way for Leyla to come back into the show." Shahidi said that she had always hoped Leyla would return at some point and she was excited about Leyla's return storyline. The show's producers decided not to announce Shahidi's return, so viewers would be surprised. When asked how long she would be staying with the show, she quipped that Leyla would have "lots of exciting stuff" in 2014 and she and Anderson had spent time filming on location. The actress added "After that, there's stuff in the pipeline but I haven't read the scripts yet!"

Alicia later finds Leyla working as a pole dancer. To prepare for the storyline, Shahidi took pole dancing lessons and had to wear a PVC catsuit. Shahidi explained that it was important for viewers to warm to Leyla and she did not want to be wearing "a little pair of panties", as it may have been off putting to some. She thought the catsuit was the perfect outfit for Leyla as it made her look ridiculous. She told Susan Hill from the Daily Star that she enjoyed the fact Leyla did not come back to the village straight away following her appearance at Christmas, saying "It means the viewers can see what she's been doing while she's been away." Hill reported that there would be "lots of twists and turns" as Leyla continues to work on her relationships with her sister and son. Shahidi added that she was looking forward to the next chapter in Leyla's life.

=== Departure and death ===
On 6 October 2024, it was announced that Shahidi would be departing Emmerdale as Leyla once again, with the desire to "spread her wings." A spokesperson told The Sun: "Roxy has adored her time on the soap and has made so many happy memories since first joining. The cast have become like family to her and she has grown so much as an actress, but now feels like the perfect time to spread her wings and try something new. She is really excited about her meaty exit storyline, which will see her character Leyla die on screen. She'd rather go out in a blaze of glory and be remembered."

In the weeks running up to her final scenes, Leyla is shown to have developed extreme loneliness. She "is left miserable as she wallows in her loneliness" and feels that her friends and family have become too busy with other people to find time for her. At the end of the episode broadcast on 18 February 2025, Leyla was killed off in a limousine crash stunt which saw the vehicle plunge into an icy lake. Leyla was initially pulled from the water and was taken to hospital. In a cliff-hanger, one character was pronounced dead prior to their arrival at hospital. In the following episode on 19 February, it was revealed that Leyla had died. Her final scenes feature Jacob saying goodbye to Leyla as she lay dead in a hospital bed.

After finding out the producers were set to kill her character, Shahidi said she was shocked since she had been on Emmerdale for a long time. She felt that for long-running cast members like herself, "Emmerdale becomes a fabric of [their] existence" so was not expecting to be killed off. However, Shahidi tried to take it as a compliment. She recalled a producer telling her "you have to be worth killing!". She found filming her final scenes difficult, accrediting this to Plant's portrayal of grief in Jacob. She added: "At one point I was supposed to be dead and I had tears streaming down my eyes, I was a weeping corpse."

On 1 March, it was confirmed that Leyla would feature through voiceover during her funeral episode, which aired on 6 March. The day before the episode, it was further revealed that Leyla would appear in flashback scenes, which reveal three secrets the character learned prior to her death to the audience. Shahidi described the scenes as "a really unique way to end Leyla's time on the show".

== Storylines ==
=== 2008–2011 ===
Leyla visits Emmerdale for a job interview with Eric Pollard (Chris Chittell). She tells him that she won Machinist of the Year in 2007 and left her last job because of "inappropriate overtime" with a young manager. Eric gives her the job and Leyla soon makes friends with her colleagues and joins the St. Mary's Church Choir, formed to enter a competition and save the church from closure.

Months later, colleague Lily Butterfield (Anne Charleston) sees Leyla leaving the building late at night and arriving very early. Eventually, Leyla reveals she is sleeping there and that she was at university. Unfortunately her part-time jobs as a cleaner and barmaid meant things got on top of her and she left. Lily asked Leyla to move in with her and Edna Birch (Shirley Stelfox), Lily's sister, who was unhappy with the arrangement so Lily and Leyla joined Pearl Ladderbanks (Meg Johnson). When Pearl or Lily ask Leyla about her family, she is evasive.

Leyla is interested in David Metcalfe (Matthew Wolfenden), inviting him to a concert but he is sidetracked by Nicola De Souza (Nicola Wheeler), who is upset due to thinking that her father is terminally ill. On learning Rodney is healthy, David tells Leyla he can go after all. In early February, they go out for the night and meets Skin (Greg Wood), who drives them back to Emmerdale. When Skin tries getting close to Leyla, she makes him sleep in his van. The next day, Pearl sees him leaving with their valuables. David, by chance, knocks him down and Leyla kisses him as a thank you. They have a brief relationship but he breaks up her when she believes he has feelings for Nicola. In April, they reconcile and Leyla tells David that her mother is in a care home, so she needs to earn more to fund it. They grow closer when campaigning for his election to the local council, which he wins that June.

Leyla starts work as deputy manager of the farm shop opened by Natasha Wylde (Amanda Donohoe) in the village. On seeing Maisie's new shoes, Leyla was jealous and stole £250 from the shop for a pair, planning to put it back when she got paid. However, Natasha's son Nathan (Lyndon Ogbourne) found out and surprised Leyla be being understanding. After going to a concert together, they got drunk and had a one-night stand. Attempting to quit her job, Nathan turned nasty and blackmailed her, but made David suspicious. In November, she admits to her one-night stand with Nathan and, disgusted, he left. When he saw Nathan attacking Leyla, he punched him and later forgave her, reuniting in December. Leyla bought the farm shop and renamed it "Leyla's".

Now officially together, they bought Farrers Barn. Leyla got the news that her mum had died and insisted on attending the funeral alone. She comforted her sister Alicia Gallagher (Natalie Anderson), during the service but Alicia insisted Leyla leave, saying that she could not be trusted. Leyla later visited her sister's house and watched her with her husband, Justin, and young son, Jacob (Joe-Warren Plant). She met Justin several times in secret, making David think she was having an affair. She swore she wasn't but wouldn't explain so David left for a council trip, thinking Leyla was lying. While away, Alicia and Jacob visited and Leyla's difficult relationship with her mother and sister was explained. Jacob is, in fact, Leyla's son. When she was 18, she got pregnant accidentally and her mum and Alicia encouraged her to let Alicia and her husband adopt the baby, despite Leyla not wanting to give Jacob away after he was born. After much persuasion, Leyla gave Jacob to Alicia as she couldn't have children and she felt like she owed her. It was later revealed that Alicia's husband is, in fact Jacob's biological father, after a drunken one night stand with Leyla.

When Alicia revealed that she and Justin had split up, Leyla insisted they stay with her and David. David was unhappy but accepted it to make Leyla happy. Alicia soon got a job as barmaid at The Woolpack but annoyed David by assuming that Leyla would babysit. Eventually, David got so fed up of the complications that having Jacob around caused, he demanded Leyla choose: him or Jacob. She promptly left but later sent Jacob a present. After Alicia and David tell Jacob that Leyla is his birth mother, Jacob begins emailing Leyla.

=== 2013–2018 ===
Leyla returns, demanding to speak to Alicia and Jacob. She meets David and tells him that Jacob has been emailing her, as he knows she is his biological mother. Leyla then learns that David is marrying Alicia. Val Pollard (Charlie Hardwick) lock Leyla in a cupboard, to stop her ruining the wedding. She is later let out and sees Alicia, who promptly slaps her.

Alicia sees that Jacob is confused and upset, following Leyla's visit, and agrees to let her be part of Jacob's life. After dropping Leyla at her flat, Alicia sees her leave and follows her to a strip club. She learns that Leyla is now a pole dancer and angrily drags her offstage before being arrested on suspicion of soliciting. They are released the next day and Leyla returns to Emmerdale with Alicia, much to David's annoyance. Leyla makes friends with Priya Sharma (Fiona Wade) who helps her get a job at the factory. She moves in with Katie Sugden (Sammy Winward). Leyla tries to help Priya through her pregnancy, as she has an eating disorder. She is surprised to learn that David is the baby's father but more concerned that Priya is putting the baby at risk. She denies that she has an eating problem but finally confides in her and Leyla accompanies Priya to a scan, where they are told the baby is smaller than average, but unharmed. However, Priya is worried but repeatedly tells Leyla not to tell anyone, adamant that she can cope alone. However, Leyla tells Jai Sharma (Chris Bisson), and he forces her to eat a biscuit, making her angry. She is also angry with Leyla for telling him but Leyla also tells Alicia.

Alicia receives a £70,000 inheritance from the recently deceased Keith Cheesedale. Alicia accepts the money and learns that Mr. Cheesedale was Leyla's boss/lover. The money was mistakenly given to Alicia as Leyla's stage name was "Alicia Harding". Alicia and David refuse to give Leyla the money until Jacob throws it in the river. David and Leyla recover most of it and she repays Jacob the money he lent her and gives Alicia and David enough for a new car. A delighted Leyla then enjoys her windfall.

Leyla later becomes business partners with Megan Macey (Gaynor Faye) and they decide to base their new-found business around wedding planning. They plan Laurel Thomas (Charlotte Bellamy) and Marlon Dingle's (Mark Charnock) wedding and Priya's wedding to Rakesh Kotecha (Pasha Bocarie). When flirting with Megan's boyfriend, Jai, Leyla realises that she has a crush on him, touches him and they end up copulating. Leyla tries to end her affair with Jai repeatedly but keeps falling for his charms and they are caught by Rakesh. Leyla swears Rakesh to secrecy but her friends become suspicious, knowing that she is in a secret relationship. Jai and Leyla are nearly caught by Megan but Leyla manages to hide. After Jai is rushed to hospital following an accident at home, Megan discovers Jai and Leyla's affair. She tries to convince Leyla to sell her half of the business to her, but Leyla refuses. She does, however, agree to stay away from Jai and Megan reconciles with him.

Leyla supports Alicia when she is sexually assaulted by Lachlan White (Thomas Atkinson), and helps Alicia, David and Jacob through their difficult time. She slaps Georgia Sharma (Trudie Goodwin), for snide remarks about Alicia dress sense, saying that is what made Lachlan attack her. Alicia changes her style and appearance, upsetting Leyla as she tries to convince her sister not to change because of what Lachlan did. She is pleased for Alicia and David when they decide to move to Portugal but argues with Alicia on realising that she will not be able to spend time with Jacob. Leyla rekindles her affair with Jai, who is still with Megan, and he promises that he will marry Leyla after leaving Megan, which excites her. However, her feelings are challenged when she sees him violently grab Rachel Breckle's (Gemma Oaten) and threaten to murder her if she does not give him custody of their son, Archie. Leyla tells the court about Jai's behaviour, which causes Jai to lose his case for residency. The affair ends when she thinks that Megan has miscarried Jai's baby.

Alicia returns to the village when Val is killed in a helicopter crash and is shocked by David's plans to stay and buy the shop back. When Alicia and David announce their separation, Leyla tries to make David see what he is throwing away and books him a ticket to Portugal but he refuses to go, frustrating Leyla. She says a tearful farewell to Alicia and Jacob and insists David made the wrong decision. Leyla tells him that Alicia is filing for divorce and is annoyed that he does not care.

Leyla begins dating Pete Barton (Anthony Quinlan) and they become engaged. However, they end the relationship after deciding, on their wedding day, that they are rushing things. She later discovers from Pete's mother, Emma Barton (Gillian Kearney), that Pete had been having an affair with Leyla's best friend, Priya. She attacks Priya in the salon after finding out and declares they are no longer friends.

Following the death of Pete's mother, Emma, and younger brother, Finn Barton (Joe Gill), Leyla supports Pete as a friend, however is shocked to learn that Pete could potentially be the father of his aunt, Moira Dingle's (Natalie J. Robb) baby after having sex with her while engaged to Leyla. After learning that Emma was murdered, Leyla also informs the police that Priya had threatened Emma.

=== 2018–2025 ===
Shahidi took maternity leave in early January 2018 and returned in October 2018 where her character Leyla reconciled with Jacob. In April 2019, Leyla is involved in the soap's Big Night Out and attacks paedophile teacher Maya Stepney following the revelation that she had been grooming her student Jacob Gallagher throughout the end of 2018 and start of 2019.

She along with Priya Kotecha and Tracy Metcalfe attempted to cover up the teacher's supposed "death" believing that they had killed her. However, it was later revealed she had survived and she was later put on trial for her crimes. Although they hoped that would put an end to it, Leyla and David struggled as Jacob still didn't see what Maya had done as anything wrong and was convinced they were in love. Subsequently, he despised Leyla and David for what they had done and blamed them for Maya going to prison.

In June 2021, Leyla marries Liam Cavanagh. Their wedding day is slightly catastrophic as Liam's ex-partner Bernice Blackstock does all she can to sabotage the day since she wanted Liam back, although in the end, she backs down, and lets the two get married. Not even a month after their marriage, Liam's daughter Leanna dies on her 18th birthday, supposedly after falling off a bridge, later found out to have been murdered by Meena Jutla. Liam grieves and is very down as Leyla supports him. Liam begins to act suspiciously and starts illegally visiting his old house where he, Leanna, and his ex-wife lived when Leanna was a child. Leyla initially suspects that he is having an affair with Bernice, so follows him to the house and learns that he has been gardening where Leanna had planted a tree which was now fully grown. The home owner comes out and confronts Leyla, who puts up a fight and smashes a garden gnome. The police then arrive and Liam returns after a break, horrified by what he is seeing. Leyla explained everything to the police, who are sympathetic towards her. After she learns of her husband's interest in gardening, she gets him a spot at the village allotment, where he spends much time with various villagers, and eventually turns a tide.

In January 2022, it is revealed that Leanna's death was not an accident and that she was actually murdered by their supposed friend, Meena Jutla, who had also murdered Nadine Butler, Leyla's business partner Andrea Tate, her neighbour Ben Tucker and had also attempted to murder several more people. Liam understandably regresses and feels as if he has lost Leanna all over again. Leyla too is affected by this. After this revelation, Meena flees the village, although returns on the day of her ex-boyfriend Billy Fletcher's wedding to Dawn Taylor, somebody who Meena did not like at all. Meena kidnaps them and holds them hostage on an abandoned viaduct and issues them an ultimatum. Leyla, who had been planning their wedding, realises that something is not right when the location of the limousine they had hired was on the viaduct, and not on the way to Home Farm, where the reception was. Leyla heads out to see what is going on, and is shocked to find Meena on the viaduct with Billy and Dawn. Dawn pleads with Leyla to go back, although as she is doing so, Meena shoots her with a gun. She is later taken to hospital, and fortunately survives, however, it's clear that had a huge impact on Leyla's mental health.

At some point after her recovery, Leyla meets somebody called Suzy Merton who occasionally took cocaine. She also allows Leyla to take some, and she begins to come an addict. When Leyla spots Suzy in the village on a date with Vanessa Woodfield, she is horrified and worried that her drug use may be revealed. Eventually Leyla becomes okay with Suzy being in the village, and they even go to have a meal at Moira Dingle's house with Vanessa. When they are there, the conversation directs to Moira's daughter Holly, who died of a heroine overdose a few years prior. Moira points out the photo of Holly on the fridge, and Suzy is visibly on edge after seeing it. Afterwards, Leyla asks her what was wrong, and Suzy reveals that she knew Holly, and that she had given her the money for the heroine that killed her, thinking she was only going to buy cocaine.

Following this, Suzy decides to get clean, and stops doing drugs permanently. Leyla reluctantly agrees, although when she cannot cope, she encourages Jai Sharma to give her his old dealers number, supposedly to make him a better person and that she would burn it on a fire. He agrees, and assumes that she had burnt it along with other bits of scrap, although she had actually hidden it in her hand and when he leaves, she starts using it. When she meets him, it's obvious that he is dodgy. He is very threatening and when Leyla calls him twice in one day after having to throw away the previous drugs she had purchased after a police officer was in her midst, he accuses her of ripping him off and selling his drugs on. Eventually, he begins to blackmail her and says that if she does not get Jai back on his drugs, he will not serve her again. Suzy discovers this along with Leyla feeling unwell after taking some of his drugs. She explains that dealers like him are bad news and that drugs are of terrible quality. Eventually she confronts the dealer and tells him that she had been recording when he was talking about dealing drugs, and tells him to leave and never bother Leyla again. Leyla is furious with Suzy and then tells her that if she doesn't give her the phone number of her dealer, she would tell Moira about her role in Hollys death. Suzy reluctantly agrees but tells her that their friendship is over.

Leyla continues to take drugs and is eventually caught by David Metcalfe, who is disgusted by what he sees. Leyla begs him not to tell Liam, and he reluctantly agrees, but tells her that she needs to get help, she tells him that she has stop and has been attending support sessions, although avoids them and end up attending Italian for beginners. Eventually, Leyla calls up her dealer again, and explains that she has no money, so he therefore says that she can store drugs for him instead. The drugs are then stolen by Matty Barton, who plants them on Suzy to get revenge on her for Holly's death, after The Bartons learn the truth, although his plan backfires as Leyla finds the drugs and returns them to her office. That same day, Leyla takes more drugs and eventually has a heart attack. Liam then finds her unconscious and all is revealed. Liam is disgusted with his wife, and has Suzy and Cain Dingle return the bag of drugs to her dealer. Once she is off the hook, Liam forgives her and she acknowledged that she is an addict, and goes to rehab.

When Leyla returns from Rehab in November, her relationship with Liam breaks down, as Liam kisses Bernice, and Leyla goes away again to stay with a friend. When she returns, they talk and agree that their marriage has come to the end of the line, and Liam informs Leyla that he has filed for divorce. On New Year's Eve, she is about to tell Liam she still has feelings for him before fireworks go off and he and Bernice are together, which causes her to relapse in early 2023 and returns to message Callum for drugs, which Jacob finds out about and is furious.

Jacob decides to confront her former drug dealer Callum before he is stabbed. Leyla vows for revenge but he is nowhere to be seen. At the end of January, she is offered a job in London to expand her career as a wedding planner but eventually gives the job to Priya (Fiona Wade) as she continues to deal with triggers from the damage Meena did to her and the village. She overcomes them and heads to London with her daughter Amber, which causes a stir between her and David. Leyla says goodbye to her best pal as she heads out. In March, there has been sightings of Callum before Leyla comes forward with information as he threatens to kidnap her. Leyla is then kidnapped before Jacob and Suzy search for her. They find her but also get trapped where the three are held at gunpoint, they all convince Callum to surrender, which he does, as they all move on and Leyla overcomes her addiction to drugs. In November, David is shocked at Jacobs affair with Victoria, his ex, and heads to London to join Priya and Amber before he and Leyla say goodbye and he asks Jacob to take care of her always.

In 2024 she helps Eric run David's shop as she and Victoria later have a heated argument about her causing a havoc before Victoria slaps her after saying she is just as bad as Maya. In July she gathers around with her friends at the woolpack to mark an important celebration for Kerry.

In February 2025 disaster strikes when Leyla is involved in a limousine crash with several other villagers, she is badly injured and eventually dies en route to the hospital. Jacob, who is on shift at the hospital, searches for Leyla and is devastated when he finds her in the mortuary. He tells her he is sorry and he loves her. Later with Eric, Jacob listens to a voicemail Leyla left on the night of the accident telling him she loves him very much.

== Reception ==
A reporter from Holy Soap named Leyla's most "memorable moment" as being when she thought Rodney was attempting to seduce her. Leyla's death was shortlisted for "Best Exit" at the 2025 Inside Soap Awards, whilst the Limo crash disaster was longlisted for "Best Showstopper".
