= Natalie Anderson (actress) =

English actress (born 1981)

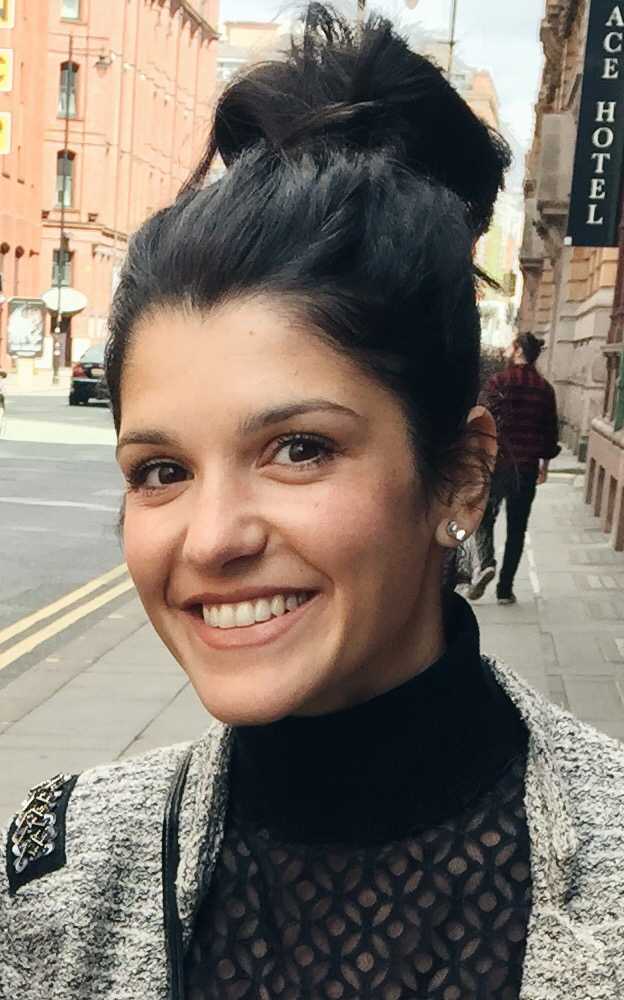
- Anderson in 2015.
- Born: 24 October 1981 (age 44); Bradford, West Yorkshire, England
- Occupations: Actress; singer; television presenter
- Years active: 1996–present
- Television: Emmerdale; The Royal; This Morning; Loose Women; Hollyoaks; Coronation Street
- Spouse: James Shephard (m. 2008)
- Children: 1

Natalie Jane Anderson (born 24 October 1981) is an English actress, singer and television presenter who is known for her roles as Stella Davenport in the medical drama The Royal from 2005 to 2008 and Alicia Metcalfe in the ITV soap opera Emmerdale from 2010 to 2015. She also played the role of Nessarose in the London production Wicked from May 2009 to March 2010. In 2015, she began appearing on the ITV talk shows This Morning and Loose Women on a recurring basis; Anderson also played Lexi Calder in the Channel 4 soap opera Hollyoaks from 2021 to 2022. In 2021, she played the role of Maryanne Borden in Liam Neeson action thriller Memory. In 2023, Anderson took guest roles in Happy Valley and Boiling Point and appeared on stage at Hull Truck Theatre as Kayla in Anna Jordan’s two hander play Pop Music. In 2024, Anderson played Claire Walker in the Netflix adaptation of Harlan Coben’s thriller “Fool Me Once”.

== Early and personal life ==
Anderson was born in Bradford, West Yorkshire, England. She was once a Bradford Bulls cheerleader. Anderson married James Shepherd at a ceremony in Harrogate on 6 June 2008. On 1 August 2012, Anderson gave birth to their first child, a son.

== Career ==
In 2001, Anderson competed in Pop Idol; she narrowly missed out on a place in the live finals after finishing third in her group. Anderson appeared as Nurse Stella Davenport in the ITV drama series The Royal between 2005 and 2008. Then in 2008, she released an album, Return to Me.

From 2009–2010, Anderson played the role of Nessarose in the West End production of Wicked at Apollo Theatre taking over the role from Caroline Keiff.

Anderson joined the cast of Emmerdale in 2010 as Alicia Gallagher, Leyla Harding's (Roxy Shahidi) sister. On 24 May 2015, Anderson announced she would be not be renewing her contract for Emmerdale and would leave the soap after five years.

On 9 February 2014, Anderson appeared on the ITV entertainment show, All Star Family Fortunes with her family, who were competing against Steve Redgrave and his family. On 27 September 2014, Anderson appeared in a celebrity episode of The Chase. In 2015, she began appearing on the ITV talk shows Loose Women and This Morning as a features presenter. In 2016, she launched the lifestyle brand, the Capsule; the brand focuses on fashion, beauty and wellbeing, and in 2019, its accompanying podcast The Capsule in Conversation interviewing celebrities and experts was launched. From 2017 to 2018, Anderson originated the role of Lauren in Kay Mellor’s Fat Friends The Musical which had its world premiere at Leeds Grand Theatre. From 2018 to 2019, Anderson hosted Mishaps Podcast with Jodie Prenger and Neil Hurst. In October 2021, she began appearing in the Channel 4 soap opera Hollyoaks as Lexi Calder. Natalie played Maryanne Borden in the Liam Neeson action feature Memory, released 29 April 2022. In 2023, Anderson took supporting roles in BBC’s Happy Valley and Boiling Point. In 2024, Anderson played Claire Walker in the Netflix adaptation of Harlan Coben’s thriller Fool Me Once.

== Filmography ==
Year	Title	Role	Notes
1996	The Biz	Francesca	Main role
2001	Pop Idol	Herself	Contestant
2005	Dalziel and Pascoe	Nurse Corby	2 episodes
2005	Holby City	Justine Lake	Episode: "Patience"
2005–2008	The Royal	Nurse Stella Davenport	Main role
2006	Wire In The Blood	Joanne Railton	Episode: "Time to Murder and Create"
2009	Freight	Ewa	Film
2010–2015	Emmerdale	Alicia Gallagher	Regular role; 616 episodes
2013	Your Face Sounds Familiar	Herself	Contestant; winner
2015–2025	Loose Women	Herself	Regular competition presenter
2015–2025	This Morning	Herself	Recurring presenter
2021–2022	Hollyoaks	Lexi Calder	Regular role; 30 episodes
2022	Memory	Maryanne Borden	Supporting role
2024	Fool Me Once	Claire Walker	Supporting role
2025–present	Coronation Street	Danielle Silverton	Recurring role

== Awards and nominations ==
Year	Award	Category	Work	Result	Ref.
2006	12th National Television Awards	Most Popular Newcomer	The Royal	Nominated	
2011	British Soap Awards	Sexiest Female	Emmerdale	Nominated	
2011	TV Choice Awards	Best Soap Newcomer	Emmerdale	Nominated	
2011	Inside Soap Awards	Sexiest Female	Emmerdale	Nominated	
2012	British Soap Awards	Sexiest Female	Emmerdale	Nominated	
2012	All About Soap Awards	Best Dressed Soap Star	Emmerdale	Nominated	
2012	Inside Soap Awards	Sexiest Female	Emmerdale	Shortlisted	
2013	British Soap Awards	Sexiest Female	Emmerdale	Shortlisted	
2013	Inside Soap Awards	Sexiest Female	Emmerdale	Shortlisted	
2014	2014 British Soap Awards	Sexiest Female	Emmerdale	Nominated	
2014	Inside Soap Awards	Sexiest Female	Emmerdale	Shortlisted	
2015	2015 British Soap Awards	Best Actress	Emmerdale	Shortlisted	
2015	2015 British Soap Awards	Best Dramatic Performance	Emmerdale	Nominated	
2015	TV Choice Awards	Best Soap Actress	Emmerdale	Shortlisted	
2015	Inside Soap Awards	Best Actress	Emmerdale	Nominated	
2015	Inside Soap Awards	Sexiest Female	Emmerdale	Shortlisted	
