= Marshall Hamston =

Fictional character from Emmerdale

- Emmerdale character
- Portrayed by: Max Fletcher
- First appearance: 5 January 2023
- Last appearance: 20 July 2023
- Introduced by: Jane Hudson
In-universe information
- Father: Colin Hamston
- Mother: Rachel Hamston
- Aunts: Jean

Marshall Hamston is a fictional character from the British soap opera Emmerdale, portrayed by Max Fletcher. He made his first appearance on 5 January 2023. Marshall is introduced as a classmate of established character Arthur Thomas (Alfie Clarke) and his initial storyline sees him tell Arthur that he wants to go on a date with him, but it turns out that Marshall's friends are pulling on a prank on Arthur instead. Marshall then reveals that he actually does like Arthur and the pair almost kiss, but Marshall then tells Arthur that they are just friends. Marshall's homophobic father Colin Hamston (Mark Noble) tries to separate the teenagers and attempts to send Marshall away to boarding school. After discovering that Colin has been abusing Marshall, Arthur's mother Laurel Thomas (Charlotte Bellamy) rescues the teenager and he moves in with her family. Marshall struggles with his mental health and almost drinks himself to death, but he begins to accept his sexuality and becomes Arthur's boyfriend. Fletcher later departed the soap and Marshall made his last appearance on 20 July 2023. His exit storyline saw him break up with Arthur and move away with his aunt. Emmerdale executive producer Jane Hudson had previously said that Arthur and Marshall's storyline was meant to be about teenage first love and hinted it would be short-lived. Marshall continued to influence storylines after his departure due to the aftermath of Arthur's heartbreak and Colin kidnapping Laurel. Marshall and Arthur's romance was well-received and compared to the story of Heartstopper. However, Marshall's departure and the sudden end of his relationship with Arthur was criticised by viewers and critics.

== Development ==
=== Introduction ===
The character's debut was reported in December 2022, where it was teased that established character April Windsor (Amelia Flanagan) would get into a fight with Marshall, although the casting and further details were not yet disclosed. Marshall is introduced as the schoolmate of several established characters, including April and Arthur Thomas (Alfie Clarke), the latter of whom had just come out as gay weeks prior and posted an inspirational" coming out video, which makes him the target of school bullies. Arthur develops a crush on Marshall and is "thrilled" when Marshall wants to spend time with him. At April party, Marshall appears to be genuine towards Arthur but two other boys make fun of Arthur. Arthur cannot "believe it" when Marshall asks him if he likes him romantically, which he replies that he does, although he is tentative with his response as he tries to figure out what Marshall's trying to say. When it appears that Marshall is about to kiss him, it is then revealed to be a "cruel prank" as the other boys start laughing outside and give money to Marshall as part of the bet. Arthur is devastated as he realises that Marshall had gone along with their "nasty" trick, and although Marshall plays along and laughs, he appears guilty and mumbles a "quiet apology" before a "heartbroken" Arthur runs off and cries about what has just happened. Following the prank, April defends Arthur and punches Marshall, whilst Arthur also creates a plan to stand up to Marshall. Laura Denby from Radio Times questioned whether Marshall would put things right with Arthur following his prank. Denby also questioned whether Marshall was displaying homophobic behaviour, and if Arthur's plan would tackle the situation "the right way".

=== Near kiss and abusive father ===
Marshall regrets his actions and later publicly defends Arthur in front of his tormentors, which makes Arthur believe that Marshall may be on his side and he begins to hope that Marshall has feelings for him. Arthur's mother, Laurel Thomas (Charlotte Bellamy), is not happy that Arthur is hanging out with Marshall after the bullying scandal so she warns him to stay away. When Arthur is upset about his LGBTQ+ History Month assembly being cancelled due to someone complaining about it, Marshall tracks him down and offers his sympathy about it, which surprises Arthur as he was making his life "hell" a few weeks ago and now is trying to make amends. An Emmerdale insider explained to Inside Soap that whilst Arthur is grateful that Marshall is being nicer, he is also "suspicious" about whether he can trust Marshall after the trick he played. The insider added, "Could Marshall be actually be secretly attracted to Arthur, but doing his best to deny it to avoid being bullied himself? It certainly appears that way when the boys are alone and the atmosphere is practically crackling with electricity". There, things heat up for the boys when Marshall admits that he would like to go on a date with Arthur and leans in to kiss him, which stuns Arthur. They have a "charged moment" and they are about to kiss, but Marshall's phone rings with a phone call from his father and the interruption breaks the intimacy. Marshall pulls away and" storms off" and insists that he should not have been there, which leaves Arthur feeling "more confused than ever". Johnathon Hughes from Inside Soap questioned whether there could be a potential romance for Marshall and Arthur.

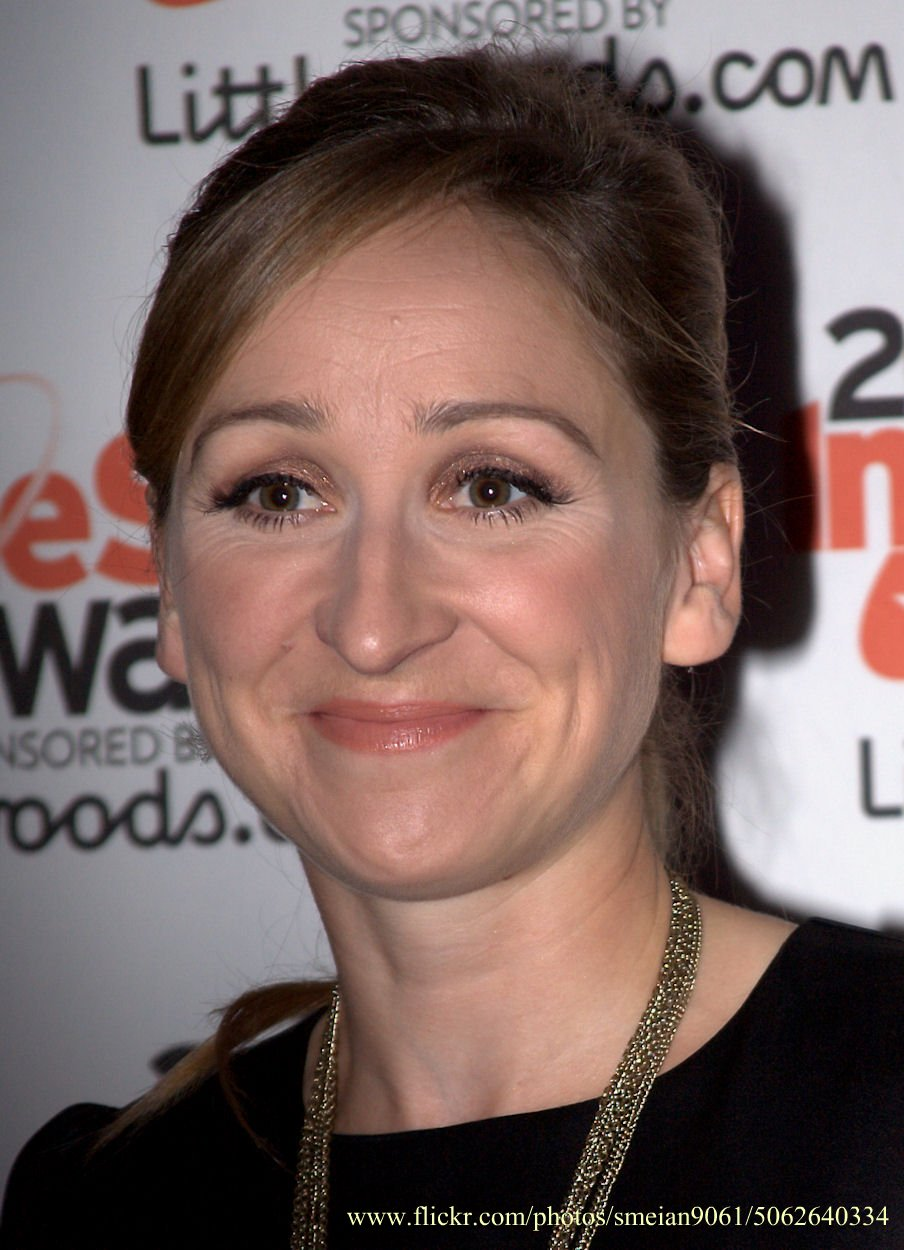
Charlotte Bellamy (pictured) portrays Laurel Thomas, who saves Marshall from his abusive father.

Laurel has to tell Arthur that his LGBTQ+ assembly is receiving pushback due to a complaint from a parent. Laurel then has a confrontation with Colin Hamston (Mark Noble), who argues that parents have rights to their beliefs, which upsets Arthur. Arthur is then further upset when Marshall tells him that he is not gay despite their near-kiss, but he is forgiving and the pair go on a bike ride. Laurel then realises that Colin is Marshall's father and the parent who made the complaint and warns him to not look at his son after Colin sneers at Arthur. Arthur confides in Laurel about what has been happening with Marshall and says that he wants to help him, but Laurel warns him as she does not want her son getting hurt. Marshall then tells Arthur that they cannot be friends and says some "vile and hurtful things" about homosexuality and tells him to leave him alone, leaving Arthur "heartbroken".

Arthur and Marshall remain friends but Arthur continues to have a crush on him. Arthur begins hoping that Marshall will admit his romantic feelings for him, but Marshall insists that the two cannot even be friends and that he wants nothing to do with him. This devastates Arthur, who puts his energy into organising his presentation for LGBTQ+ History Month. Inside Soap questioned whether Arthur could still be secretly hoping that romance could "blossom" for the pair. Marshall continues to keep his distance, but he listens to Arthur's LGBTQ+ speech, which seems to show a "change of heart". However, Colin sees Arthur and Marshall talking and takes Marshall away, and the next day Marshall reveals that Colin is planning to send him away to boarding school, leaving Arthur heartbroken. Marshall also claims that he does not have feelings for Arthur and that they are only friends. Laurel then finds out something "surprising" about Marshall and when he cries uncontrollably to her, she realises that he is going through something; Colin ends up hugging Marshall and tells him that he can stay at his school.

In order to keep Marshall from being sent away to boarding school, Arthur hides Marshall in Rishi Sharma's (Bhasker Patel) house. The identity of "mystery person" staying in his house was initially kept a secret from viewers until the reveal that it was Marshall. Laurel then discovers the boys and is shocked to learn that they had hidden the disappearance by forging a letter to the boarding school. Despite Arthur's pleas, Laurel tells Colin of Marshall's whereabouts and Colin surprises a "tearful" Marshall by apologising for his actions. Laurel is pleased when Colin tells Marshall that he can return to his old school, but she is later worried when Arthur tells her that he has not been replying to his messages and reveals his previous nasty encounter with Colin. This leads Laurel to believe that Colin was putting on an act in front of her earlier and she fears for Marshall's safety. Arthur then hears back from Marshall, who tells him that Colin has locked him in his room. Laurel arrives at Marshall's house and after arguing with Colin, she finds bruises on Marshall's arms and realises that Colin is mentally and physically abusing Marshall. Marshall confirms that Colin is responsible and Laurel tells him that he can move in with her, which he accepts; Colin tries to block the move but Laurel threatens to call the police. Before leaving, Marshall tells Colin that he believes he may be gay, leading to Colin insulting and disowning him. Laurel supports Marshall and tells him that he can stay for as long as he likes and Arthur is delighted when Marshall arrives at his home. However, Marshall is unable to return to his school without his father's approval as he had withdrawn Marshall to keep him away from Arthur. When Colin agrees that it is okay, Laurel suspects that he is saying that to keep his abuse of Marshall hidden. Marshall ends up overhearing Laurel's boyfriend Jai Sharma (Chris Bisson) telling Laurel that is unsure about Marshall staying long-term, which leaves him devastated. Colin then starts manipulating Marshall into coming home, claiming to be sorry for disowning him for his sexuality and expressing that he misses him, although he is really just trying to save his reputation. Colin then tells Marshall that he does not what his sexuality is until he has been with a girl and suggests that he joins a football team to keep busy with "normal" activities and tells him that it is time to come home as he has overstayed his stay at Laurel's house.

Arthur is upset when Marshall arranges a date with Cathy Hope (Gabrielle Dowling) and Laurel tells her son to be patient with Marshall. At the date, Cathy tries to make a move on Marshall, but he rushes off. He then tells Arthur that his father had told him that he could not label his sexuality without experimenting with women, and Arthur talks him into letting Cathy down gently. There is then a "sweet moment" between Arthur and Marshall where Marshall accepts that his father was only looking out for himself.

=== Mental health and binge-drinking ===
Having been disowned by his father, Marshall goes "off the rails". He later confides to Laurel about his mental health struggles and his struggle with accepting his sexuality. After taking Marshall in, Laurel begins hoping that he will open up now that he is not under his father's influence. However, Laurel worries about Marshall when she begins noticing some things that make her suspect that something is up with him. Inside Soap questioned whether Laurel had made things better by moving Marshall into her home, or if there was something else "entirely" that was bothering him.

Marshall continues to struggle to cope and turns to alcohol. He confides in Laurel that it is the anniversary of his mother's death and opens up to Arthur about it, but he dismisses Arthur when he tries to support and says that he is being ignored by his father when he needs him the most. Marshall then bumps into Cathy and the pair drink vodka whilst discussing their problems. Marshall ends up getting drunk and apologises for his behaviour; Laurel grounds him but promises to be there for him. At home, Marshall tells Arthur that he has been stupid, but he continues to secretly drink in his room. He continues drinking until he vomits and passes out and he is discovered unconscious and in a bad way the next morning by Laurel, leading him to be rushed to hospital. An Emmerdale insider revealed that Laurel is terrified that Marshall might die and would never forgive herself if he did, and hinted that Marshall's drinking could cause some issues for her due to Laurel being a recovering alcoholic herself. At the hospital, Colin blames Laurel and Jai for neglecting his son and threatens to hold them responsible if he has brain damage, but Laurel tells him that they both let him down. A nurse then tells them that Marshall should be back to normal in 24 hours and Colin speaks to his son and says that this was a message from God that he was on the wrong path. Arthur intervenes when Colin suggests that Marshall will not be able to go to Heaven and Marshall asks his father to leave. Marshall makes a full recovery from his binge-drinking and his health improves. Marshall then "feels ready to take the plunge" and goes on his first official romantic date with Arthur. hinted that the romance could bring Marshall a "brighter future", calling it a "welcome new romance" that could "lift his spirits".

=== Departure ===
On 11 July 2023, it was announced that Fletcher would be leaving Emmerdale as Marshall following the end of Arthur and Marshall's relationship. Emmerdale executive producer Jane Hudson had previously hinted that Arthur's romance with Marshall could be short-lived on Loose Women, calling it a "lovely" storyline and adding, "It's not just a story about coming out as gay. It's a story about teenage love and teenage angst. I think we all remember when we first broke up and we thought: 'Oh, I'm never going to find love again!"" Leading up to his departure, things become tense between Arthur and Marshall, with the latter sniping at the former for not giving him enough space. The bickering between Marshall and Arthur makes things difficult for the other people living in the house. Marshall is visited by his aunt, Jean (Emma Beattie), where he discovers that Colin had never passed on her "loving" letters, and he decides to move to Formby to live with her, though he initially struggles to tell Laurel and Jai.

Marshall made his final appearance on 20 July 2023. In the episode, which takes place during Laurel's hen do, Marshall fails to tell Laurel about his departure, and he walks out on Arthur during Jai's stag do party when the pair are at odds. When Jai catches Marshall looking at houses in Formby, Marshall is able to tell him how he is feeling and his plan to leave; Jai is surprised by this and saddened that Marshall does not want to be with Arthur anymore, and he encourages Marshall to tell him the truth. Marshall then shocks Arthur by breaking up with him after weeks of arguing, explaining that he has not been happy for a while but did not say anything as he did not want to hurt him, but still wants to stay friends; he also announces that he has decided to leave the village as he believes it is time for a "fresh start". Before leaving, Marshall says his goodbyes, thanking Laurel for everything she has done and giving Arthur an "emotional" hug goodbye, saying that he will truly miss him. Having met Jean and spoken to Marshall, Laurel is confident in Marshall's decision. Marshall's departure leads to "Poor Arthur" feeling "crushed" and heartbroken, and he is left crying in Laurel's arms. Arthur continues to struggle following Marshall's departure, with the Daily Mirror reporting that viewers would be able to "watch Arthur try to get over the heartbreak of losing his first love". The following month, Colin keeps Laurel captive in Marshall's bedroom when she tries to retrieve Marshall's passport from Colin's home, blaming her for the deterioration of his relationship with his son – revealing that Marshall does not even speak to him – and wishing he had been stricter with him, and he vows to not release her until she gets Marshall to come home, though she survives the ordeal and Colin is arrested.

== Storylines ==
Marshall meets up with his schoolmates Arthur Thomas (Alfie Clarke) and April Windsor (Amelia Flanagan) at the local café and April invites him to her party. Marshall attends the party with his two friends and he speaks to Arthur privately, saying that he would like to go on a date with him. However, Marshall's friends appear and say that Marshall won the bet, with a humiliated Arthur running away. The next day, Marshall tries to apologise to Arthur and April punches him after they get into an argument. Marshall tries to apologise again a few weeks later and stands up to his friend when he makes fun of Arthur. Marshall admits that what he said at the party was true and he does like Arthur and he did not know that his friends were watching them. Marshall and Arthur nearly kiss but are interrupted by a phone call from his father. Marshall runs away and the next day he tells Arthur that he is not gay. Arthur's mum Laurel Thomas (Charlotte Bellamy) is not a fan of Marshall for his treatment of Arthur and finds out that his father Colin Hamston (Mark Noble) is the one who has complained about Arthur's LGBTQ+ presentation. Marshall then tells Arthur that they cannot be friends and says that homosexuality is sick and wrong. Marshall later tells Arthur that he did not mean it and turns up to Arthur's LGBTQ+ event in the village hall. Arthur tells Marshall that he believes that he is not being true about his feelings for him but Colin interrupts the boys. Marshall tells Arthur that Colin is sending him away to a boarding school.

Laurel finds Arthur hiding Marshall in Rishi Sharma's (Bhasker Patel) house and she calls Colin to tell him where his son is. Colin pretends that he believes that he handled the situation badly and tells Marshall he will not send him away to boarding school and that he can still see Arthur, but Marshall ends up messaging Arthur to tell him that it was lies. Hearing of this, Laurel goes to Colin's home and discovers bruises on Marshall's arm. After Colin gets aggressive with Laurel, she offers for Marshall to move in with her, which he accepts and is grateful for. Colin disowns Marshall after he tells his father that he thinks he is gay and Laurel tells Marshall he can stay as long as he would like. Marshall goes on a date with Cathy Hope (Gabrielle Dowling) but he lets her down after realising his sexuality. Marshall ends up binge-drinking due to the pain of the anniversary of his mother's death and the rejection from his father and he passes out. He is rushed to hospital but makes a full recovery. He then goes on a date with Arthur and they become boyfriends. However, they begin arguing over various things. Marshall then reunites with his maternal aunt Jean (Emma Beattie) and finds out that Colin prevented the pair from seeing each other. Marshall decides to move to Formby with her and breaks up with Arthur but tells him that they are still friends. Marshall thanks Laurel for her kindness and leaves the village, leaving Arthur heartbroken.

== Reception ==
Laura Denby from Radio Times called the prank that Marshall and the boys played on "poor" and "heartbroken" Arthur "cruel", "nasty" and a "betrayal". She added that whilst Marshall had seemed genuine, the situation had "spiralled" at the party. She added that, "For his part, Marshall had the grace to look guilty" for what he did, and questioned whether he would put things right with Arthur. Denby also questioned whether Marshall was showing signs of homophobic behaviour. In early 2023, Alice Penwill from Inside Soap believed that there was a "lot to come" for Marshall and Arthur. Her colleague Laura-Jayne Tyler believed that Marshall looked like a "clone" of Will Byers from Stranger Things, and joked that one could not unsee it after realising. Late Lally from Liverpool Echo reported how viewers predicted that Marshall would become Arthur's love interest after the pair almost kissed, with some viewers on Twitter expressing sadness when Marshall told Arthur that he believed that being gay is wrong. In 2024, Ash Percival from Metro noted how Marshall and Arthur's romance was "well received" by viewers and that some made "positive comparisons" to Heartstopper.

Discussing Marshall's near kiss with Arthur, Johnathon Hughes from Inside Soap questioned whether there could be a potential romance for the pair and questioned whether Marshall could be Arthur's "first love". Kate Lally and Monde Mwitumwa from Leeds Live reported how Emmerdale received a "backlash" from viewers online for "ruining" Arthur and Marshall's first kiss, which was deemed a "special moment", although they also wrote how viewers were "loving" the storyline. Lally and Mwitumwa added that Marshall and Arthur did not have a good start to their "possible romance" after Marshall humiliated Arthur in the prank, which they called an "intense moment". Mwitumwa, along with Charlotte Tutton, later called Marshall a "fan-favourite" who had a "tough" few months on the soap, and also called his departure "heartbreaking" and "sad". A writer from Inside Soap called Marshall a "troubled young lad" who was under his father's "overbearing influence". Sophie May-William From OK! called Marshall's storyline "heartbreaking" and wrote that Marshall had "made quite the impact on fans" despite being on Emmerdale for only six months. She also called his storylines "dramatic" and noted that Marshall "had his fair share of heartbreaking scenes". Mia O'Hare from the Daily Mirror noted that Marshall had had a "rocky" stint on the soap opera and how he had initially gone "off the rails" after moving in with Arthur's family. O'Hare believed that Emmerdale viewers had hoped that Marshall would begin a romantic relationship with Arthur, and called his goodbye to Arthur "emotional". Dave Himelfield from Leeds Live reported how viewers were worried for Marshall when Colin appeared to change his views, with some viewers believing that he was planning something bad. Dan Seddon from Digital Spy believed that Marshall made a "self-acceptance breakthrough" after his failed date with Cathy and questioned whether he would try to date Arthur now. His colleague George Lewis called Marshall's storyline "upsetting" but opined that dating Arthur could "lift his spirits". Charlotte Tutton from the Daily Mirror called Marshall's collapse from drinking too much "horrifying" and believed that he had a "heartbreaking" backstory.

Discussing Marshall's departure, a writer from Inside Soap believed that Marshall had let down Arthur and had decided to have a fresh start just a months after the "confused lad" had found "solace" from his homophonic father. They also believed that Laurel had been a "rock" for Marshall "as he battled his demons" – now needed to be there for Arthur as he deals with the heartbreak of "losing his first love". Ellis also commented that "Poor Arthur" could not go anywhere without a "sympathetic word" about his and Marshall's breakup. A writer from Heart called Marshall's departure "emotional" and believed that Marshall had "won over fans with his storylines including abuse and homophobia". They also believed that Marshall living with Arthur and his family had added a strain to their romantic relationship. Grace Morris from What to Watch wrote that Marshall's romance with Arthur came to a "heartbreaking end" and believed that the pair were torn apart following Marshall's departure. What to Watch added that the romance had a "rocky start" that "faced its fair share of obstacles", though she believed that Marshall living in Laurel's home was a "safe environment" that gave him the "freedom" to be himself. Daniel Kilkelly from Digital Spy believed that Marshall was Arthur's "first love". Kilkelly's colleague Justin Harp called Marshall's departure "sad". Laura Denby from Radio Times called Marshall's departure a "swift exit" that included "sad scenes", and she questioned whether Arthur would be able to move on. Denby added that the fact that Marshall's "sniping" at Arthur for his lack of space showed that he was not as "content as everyone had hoped". She also called his relationship with Arthur "tentative", and his reunion with his aunt "lovely". Stephen Patterson from Metro included the breakup of Marshall and Arthur's relationship as an example of LGBTQ+ couples in soap operas never having a "happy ending", which he criticised as he believed that soap operas were not showing the "joys" that come with being part of the LGBTQ+ community. Patterson compared the storyline to Heartstopper and wrote, "Against all odds, the pair bravely accepted who they were and became boyfriends", but opined that Marshall's departure "stopped the story in its tracks".
