= Jonny McPherson =

English actor (born 1982)

- Born: Jonathan Andreas Oliver McPherson; 4 January 1982 (age 44); Kingston upon Thames, London, England
- Education: Webber Douglas Academy of Dramatic Art
- Occupation: Actor
- Years active: 2008–present
- Television: Emmerdale

Jonathan Andreas Oliver McPherson (born 4 January 1982) is an English actor, known for his role as Liam Cavanagh on the ITV1 soap opera Emmerdale. As well as his appearances on the soap, McPherson has also appeared in various short films

== Early and personal life ==
McPherson was born on 4 January 1982 in Kingston upon Thames, London. He trained in acting at the Webber Douglas Academy of Dramatic Art. McPherson began dating Emmerdale co-star Natalie J. Robb in January 2020. Due to the COVID-19 lockdowns, the two decided to move in with each other later that year. The two split in 2021. As of 2023, he is in a relationship. McPherson lived in a houseboat for several years but decided to sell it due to his acting commitments on Emmerdale, after which he moved into a flat in Leeds.

== Career ==
In 2008, McPherson made his television debut in two episodes of the ITV1 soap opera Emmerdale. He portrayed Jonathan Boam, a doctor. He appeared again in 2010 as a nurse, before making other small appearances in 2011 and 2013. In 2014, he began portraying Liam Cavanagh, a doctor who appeared on a recurring basis as part of regular characters' medical stories. McPherson was promoted to be a regular cast member in 2018, with a fictional family introduced alongside him. In 2021, he made a cameo appearance as Liam in fellow ITV1 soap opera Coronation Street as part of a special crossover event involving multiple British soaps to promote the topic of climate change ahead of the 2021 United Nations Climate Change Conference.

In 2010, McPherson made his stage debut, appearing in A Yorkshire Christmas Carol. He made numerous theatre appearances until 2017, when he began filming on Emmerdale regularly. In 2016, he appeared in the short film Night Owls, for which he received five awards.

== Filmography ==
Year	Title	Role	Notes
2008, 2010–2011, 2013	Emmerdale	Various	6 episodes
2014–present	Emmerdale	Liam Cavanagh	Regular role
2014	'Til Death	Steve Smith	Film
2015	Inhabit	Danny	Short film
2015	Thus	Farmer	Short film
2015	Rest Stop	Lee (voice)	Short film
2016	Night Owls	David Kenton	Short film
2017	Russia 1917: Countdown to Revolution	Kerensky	Short film
2021	Coronation Street	Liam Cavanagh	Cameo

== Stage ==
Year	Title	Role
2010	A Yorkshire Christmas Carol	Ebenezer Scrooge
2011	Toad	Rat
2011	The James Herriot Story	James Herriot
2012	Write Me a Murder	Clive
2012	Twelfth Night	Sir Andrew Aguecheek
2012	Mary Stuart	Kent
2012	Eddie and the Gold Tops	Eddie
2013	Three Sisters	Vershinin
2013	Economy of Thought	Reece
2013	Blood Wedding	Leonardo
2014	The Robbers	Karl
2014	Hamlet	Hamlet
2015	The 39 Steps	Hannay
2015	Fallen Angels	Willy
2015	Abigail's Party	Tony
2016	The End of Longing	Jack / Joseph
2017	Just to Get Married	Adam Lankester
2017	Ink	Various

== Awards and nominations ==
Year	Ceremony	Category	Nominated work	Result
2016	Los Angeles Film Awards	Best Actor	Night Owls	Won
2017	Short Film Awards	Best Actor in a Short Film	Night Owls	Nominated
2017	IndieFEST Film Awards	Lead Actor	Night Owls	Won
2017	Depth of Field International Film Festival Competition	Lead Actor	Night Owls	Won
2017	Actors Awards, Los Angeles	Best Actor in a Drama	Night Owls	Won
2017	Actors Awards, Los Angeles	Best Performance of the Festival	Night Owls	Nominated
2017	Beeston Film Festival	Best Actor	Night Owls	Nominated
2017	Midlands Movie Awards	Best Actor in a Leading Role	Night Owls	Won
