= Roxy Shahidi =

English actress (born 1983)

- Born: 14 March 1983 (age 43); Manchester, England
- Other name: Rokhsaneh Ali
- Occupations: Actress; screenwriter
- Years active: 2005–present
- Television: Emmerdale; Dancing on Ice
- Spouse: Arsher Ali (m. 2010)
- Children: 1

Rokhsaneh Ghawam-Shahidi (Persian: رخسانه قوام شهيدي; born 14 March 1983) is an English actress and screenwriter. She is known for portraying from 2008 to 2011 and from 2013 to 2025 the role of Leyla Harding in ITV soap Emmerdale. In 2024, she was a contestant on the sixteenth series of Dancing on Ice.

== Early life ==
Shahidi was born Rokhsaneh Gwaham-Shahidi on 14 March 1983 to an Iranian father and an English mother, and grew up in Whalley Range in Manchester. She became a vegetarian at the age of 8, and has been a vegan since the age of 21.

== Career ==
Shahidi began her career as part of Contact Young Actors Company in 2004 and went on to work for Peskar Productions as a drama workshop leader in Oldham and Bolton. Her theatre credits include East is East, Janus (for West Yorkshire Playhouse), Christie Malry's Own Double Entry at the Palace Theatre, Manchester, Freshly Scratched (for the Battersea Arts Centre) and Rafta, Rafta... at the National Theatre. Shahidi made her on-screen debut in the BBC Three comedy-drama series Sinchronicity in 2006. She has also acted in radio plays, e.g. Nadeem Aslam's Maps for Lost Lovers. From November 2012 through to January 2013 she played the role of Shahrazad in the Manchester Library Theatre Company performances of Arabian Nights at the Lowry Theatre in Salford, near Manchester.

In August 2008, Shahidi joined the cast of the ITV soap opera Emmerdale as Leyla Harding. After departing the role in August 2011, Shahidi returned to Emmerdale for two episodes in December 2013, before reprising the role on a permanent basis from January 2014. Her character was killed off in a limousine crash in February 2025, with Shahidi making her final appearance in a flashback the following month. In 2022, Shahidi and Emmerdale co-star Matthew Wolfenden were co-signed to United Agents as screenwriters. They collaborated on an episode of the BBC medical drama Holby City and three episodes of the BBC soap opera Doctors. In 2024, Shahidi appeared as a contestant on the sixteenth series of Dancing on Ice. She was paired with Sylvain Longchambon and was fourth to be eliminated.

== Personal life ==
Shahidi married actor Arsher Ali in 2010. They have a daughter together born in 2018.

Shahidi has set up a Yoga Lunch Club in the Creative Quarter in Hockley, Nottingham where she also is based. She also has a YouTube channel on which she regularly shares yoga videos.

== Filmography ==
Year	Title	Role	Notes	Ref(s)
2006	Emmerdale	Lila Wray	1 episode	Guest role
2006	Sinchronicity	Ivory	1 episode	
2008–2011, 2013–2025	Emmerdale	Leyla Harding	Regular role	
2013	National Theatre Live: Othello	Bianca	Live theatre	
2020	Naimh Armstrong: On A Different Planet	Miss Hussain	Short film	
2024	Dancing on Ice	Herself	Contestant; series 16	
2024	Drama Queens	Herself	Main cast	
2026	G'wed	Lorraine	Guest role	

== Awards and nominations ==
Year	Award	Category	Result	Ref.
2019	TV Choice Awards	Best Soap Actress	Nominated	
2019	Inside Soap Awards	Best Actress	Longlisted	
