= List of Emmerdale characters introduced in 2021 =

Emmerdale characters introduced in 2021

Emmerdale is a British soap opera first broadcast on 16 October 1972. The following is a list of characters that debuted during 2021, by order of first appearance. All characters are introduced by the soap's executive producer, Jane Hudson. Ethan Anderson (Emile John) is introduced in January as the son of vicar Charles Anderson (Kevin Mathurin). Frankie Robinson is then born in February. In August, Rob Jarvis joined the cast as Wendy Posner's (Susan Cookson) ex-husband Russell, later followed by Chloe Harris (Jessie Elland), the sister of Sarah Sugden's (Katie Hill) heart donor. Ben Richards then joined the cast in November as loan shark Gavin. He was followed by Carol Butler (Laura Pitt-Pulford) in December, who was introduced as the sister of one of Meena Jutla's (Paige Sandhu) victims. Additionally, multiple other characters appeared in 2021.

== Ethan Anderson ==
Ethan Anderson
- Emmerdale character
- Portrayed by: Emile John
- Duration: 2021–2024
- First appearance: Episode 8937; 7 January 2021
- Last appearance: Episode 10005; 28 May 2024
- Introduced by: Jane Hudson
In-universe information
- Occupation: Lawyer
- Father: Charles Anderson
- Mother: Esme
- Sisters: Naomi Walters
- Grandfathers: Victor Anderson
- Grandmothers: Claudette Anderson

Ethan Anderson, played by Emile John, made his first appearance in episode 8937, first broadcast on 7 January 2021 and his last appearance on 28 May 2024 when he was killed off following injuries sustained in a hit and run incident. Ethan is introduced as the son of vicar Charles Anderson (Kevin Mathurin). Ethan's character and casting details were announced on 26 November 2020, alongside that of Charles'. Ethan was described as "intelligent", and Digital Spy noted that he "inherited his father's strong sense of justice and worked hard to carve himself a successful law career". It was also stated that Ethan would be accused and arrested of a crime he did not commit, which would lead to a rivalry between himself and the established Dingle family. Ethan works at a law firm after years of "working hard for a successful career", and John confirmed that the storyline would have "consequences" on his career.

Producer Sophie Roper stated that Emmerdale are "delighted" to be welcoming John to the soap, and noted the "dynamic new father and son duo" will "send shockwaves through the village as they find themselves embroiled in the heart of a thought-provoking story with one of our most loved families", referring to the Dingle family. She added: "With two actors of such great calibre, they're certainly set to make their mark on the Dales." Producers later confirmed that Ethan will be a heavily featured character in 2021, with the younger cast getting a focus throughout the year, and Ethan set to have a "longer-term story arc" after the conclusion of the justice storyline. John stated that playing Ethan is "a dream", and on the storyline, he stated: "I feel a tremendous sense of responsibility in articulating his struggle with truth and authenticity and I can only hope that the audience fully engage with him in the same way I have." He added that Ethan's arrival in the village would be "far from quiet", and revealed that Ethan's presence in the village will have "huge consequences" for other characters.

Ethan attends a stag party with his friends at the Woolpack, where Sarah Sugden (Katie Hill) hides a bag of drugs inside of his coat pocket, since she needs to get rid of the drugs quickly. When the police arrive at the party, they discover the drugs in his pocket, and this leads to Ethan getting arrested. He is later released on bail, but is suspended from his law firm, leading him to demand justice from Sarah. Charles advises him not to cause a rivalry between himself and the Dingle family, but feeling he has worked too hard for his career to be ruined, he continues to demand justice for himself.

== Frankie Robinson ==
Frankie Robinson
- Emmerdale character
- Portrayed by: Ezra (2021); Eden Ratcliffe-Knights (2021–present)
- Duration: 2021–present
- First appearance: Episode 8979; 25 February 2021
- Introduced by: Jane Hudson
In-universe information
- Father: Nate Robinson
- Mother: Tracy Shankley
- Grandfathers: Cain Dingle; Frank Clayton
- Grandmothers: Cara Robinson
- Uncles: Kyle Dingle; Isaac Dingle
- Aunts: Vanessa Woodfield; Debbie Dingle
- First cousins: Sarah Sugden; Jack Sugden; Johnny Woodfield
- Other relatives: Zak Dingle; Faith Dingle; Chas Dingle; Aaron Dingle; Caleb Miligan

Frankie Robinson first appeared on 25 February 2021, when she was born. She is the daughter of Nate Robinson (Jurell Carter) and Tracy Shankley (Amy Walsh). Tracy and Nate's relationship is initially not serious, so when she discovers she was pregnant, it results in divided feelings for the couple, but they went through with the pregnancy. Tracy goes into labour two weeks early in front of Nate's father Cain Dingle's (Jeff Hordley) and Cain's half-sister Chas Dingle (Lucy Pargeter) at Cain's garage. Cain then drives Nate and Tracy to the hospital where she gives birth to Frankie. Nate is initially scared of becoming a father, until Cain talks to him. She is named after her late grandfather Frank Clayton (Michael Praed), who died 18 months before she was born.

In July 2020, it was announced that Tracy would become pregnant with Nate's baby. On the storyline, Walsh said that for Tracy, the news "does come as a massive surprise and in general it's quite shocking news to hear". Digital Spy noted that it would bring back memories from her abortion from a previous relationship, and Walsh stated that she is "a bit older than she was then, she's a bit more strong and independent". On Tracy and Nate's relationship, Walsh commented that "neither of them really know how each other feels about each other – they've never properly told each other that they love each other or any of that – so it is very soon to be going into parenthood together. They know it's a bit ridiculous that this is where they're at in this stage of the relationship". Despite this, Walsh stated that both characters would be happy to be parents, and that they "know that they can do it".

== Warren Tucker ==
Warren Tucker
- Emmerdale character
- Portrayed by: Steve Marsh
- First appearance: Episode 9087; 30 June 2021
- Last appearance: Episode 9108; 23 July 2021
- Introduced by: Jane Hudson
In-universe information
- Sons: Ben Tucker

Warren Tucker, (Note: Warren is initially credited as "Drunk Man".) played by comedian Steve Marsh, is the alcoholic father of Ben Tucker (Simon Lennon). He initially appears when he is drunk and argues with Aaron Dingle (Danny Miller) in The Woolpack. Liv Flaherty (Isobel Steele) later sees Aaron's boyfriend Ben Tucker (Simon Lennon) into a taxi. This was after he turned up at Ben's work asking him for money for more alcohol. Liv informs Aaron of the two interacting, and he demands to know who Warren is; Ben reveals that he is his father. He also reveals that he is an alcoholic. Aaron had suspected that Warren had something to do with Ben's murder, which was actually at the hands of Meena Jutla (Paige Sandhu), but it turns out that Warren had been arrested for being drunk and disorderly on the night of Ben's murder.

Lennon who plays Ben commented on Marsh's casting by saying "Steve, who plays Warren, is a brilliant actor and it’s been amazing to explore a bit about Ben’s private life." Lennon also commented on the father and son relationship between Warren and Ben, "There are so many obstacles that come with having a loved one who is an alcoholic. It can manifest in so many ways for the person struggling with it, and the people close to them...Ben has been involved in his Dad’s journey with alcoholism for years. Which is why he has tried to help Aaron with Liv, without giving away any of his own difficulties." Lennon also commented on how Ben's relationship with his father would impact his relationship with Aaron, "Ben prides himself on being a support to others, and therefore finds it so hard to face up to his own demons and the obstacles he’s facing with his Dad. It’s not as easy as just cutting ties, especially when family is involved."

== Russell Posner ==
Russell Posner
- Emmerdale character
- Portrayed by: Rob Jarvis
- First appearance: Episode 9128; 17 August 2021
- Last appearance: Episode 9153; 16 September 2021
- Introduced by: Jane Hudson
In-universe information
- Wife: Wendy Posner (backstory)
- Sons: Lee Posner; Luke Posner
- Grandsons: Harry Sugden

Russell Posner, played by Rob Jarvis, made his first appearance on 17 August 2021. Jarvis' casting was announced on 12 August 2021, with his character being described as a "mystery newcomer" set to be involved in a storyline for Wendy Posner (Susan Cookson); his connection to Wendy was not initially revealed. His initial scenes see him approach Ben Tucker (Simon Lennon) for information on Wendy and he confirms that he will be sticking around in the village to see her. Russell was later confirmed to be Wendy's abusive ex-husband. He confronts Wendy about his dead mother leaving Harry Sugden (Brody and Teddy Hall) money in her will rather than him. He tells Wendy that if she does not help him to get the inheritance from Harry, her and Harry's mother Victoria Sugden (Isabel Hodgins) will "face consequences".

On 31 August 2021, it was confirmed that Russell would hold Wendy and Victoria hostage in a siege at the Hide café to get his money. Speaking about the plot, Jarvis said that Russell tells Wendy that he has been involved in an armed robbery and that the police are after him. Jarvis opined that Russell does not want to shoot anyone, but sees a siege as a last resort to getting the money he needs. The actor also felt that Russell would be capable of shooting someone due to the desperation of his situation. Despite the state of their relationship, Jarvis stated that his character likely still has feelings for Wendy, due to the pair sharing children together. Following the police being called to the siege, Russell is imprisoned and Jarvis made his final appearance on 16 September 2021.

== Chloe Harris ==
Chloe Harris, played by Jessie Elland, made her first appearance on 20 August 2021. Chloe was introduced as the sister of Gemma Harris, a dead teenager whose heart was given to Sarah Sugden (Katie Hill) in a transplant. Elland was attracted to the role as she felt that Chloe is a well-written character and she felt a responsibility to do the role justice when she was cast. Chloe is characterised as a sweet and genuine person who is secretly struggling with feelings of sadness, anger, and frustration. This is initially explained through her grief for her dead sister, but later into her tenure, it is revealed that she has a controlling father who is in prison. Chloe's family home is installed with several cameras and her father hires numerous people to watch over her. Eventually, Kerry Wyatt (Laura Norton), her housekeeper, helps her to escape and invites her to live with Kerry in Emmerdale village. Elland has since hinted that her father could be cast on the series at some point in the future.

When Chloe moves into the village, she forms a relationship with Noah Dingle (Jack Downham). She eventually loses interest in him and has casual relationships with Jacob Gallagher (Joe-Warren Plant) and Nate Robinson (Jurell Carter). This led to the introduction of a stalking storyline for Chloe, when Noah forms an unhealthy and sexist obsession with Chloe. The storyline saw him tracking her location, letting himself into her room, photographing her and her belongings and eventually holding her hostage when she learns of his obsession. Elland praised Emmerdale for covering a storyline about misogyny and sexism, a topic she described as "such a relevant conversation, especially in this day and age". She also felt privileged to be given an important topical storyline. Viewers did not initially trust Chloe and were unsure of her intentions with Sarah, but as her tenure progressed, they have warmed to her.

== Esme ==
Esme
- Emmerdale character
- Portrayed by: Eva Fontaine
- Duration: 2021–2022
- First appearance: Episode 9172; 7 October 2021
- Last appearance: Episode 9433; 17 August 2022
- Introduced by: Jane Hudson
In-universe information
- Husband: Charles Anderson (backstory)
- Sons: Ethan Anderson
- Daughters: Naomi Walters

Esme, played by Eva Fontaine, is the ex-wife of Charles Anderson (Kevin Mathurin) and the mother of Ethan Anderson (Emile John) and Naomi Walters (Karene Peter). She first appeared on 7 October 2021. This was Fontaine's second role in Emmerdale, after playing consultant Dr Hamley between 2018 and 2019. Esme arrived in Emmerdale in October 2021 to make contact with Charles and Ethan and gives her son a letter. Ethan wasn't so keen on talking to Esme due to her abandoning him, but built a relationship with her when the truth of Charles' past is revealed. Charles was also shocked to learn of his daughter. After Esme's arrival in the village, Mathurin, who plays Charles, told Digital Spy: "When I first joined Emmerdale, I knew that down the line, there would be other family members or people from the past coming in, but I wasn't sure exactly when that would happen. We had an idea that Ethan's mum would arrive at some point. When the storyline came in, we had a fair warning beforehand – maybe about a month in advance."

Esme was married to Charles in the late 1990s, and suffered with post-natal depression, which Charles mistook the symptoms of believing she didn't love him any more, which led to him pursuing an affair with a woman named Tasha. As a result, Esme left Charles, however she learned that she was pregnant again and tried to meet up with Charles and Ethan after 8 months, but couldn't go through with it. She later gave birth to Naomi, whom she tried to look after, but her PND symptoms took over again, so she gave her up for adoption. In 2020, Naomi made contact with Esme and their relationship flourished. Mathurin also told Digital Spy: "I was a bit surprised myself! But it's great and it just shows there was even more to Charles' backstory. Nothing is black and white in Charles' world. It'd be so easy to blame Esme for leaving and say that she was a dysfunctional mother, but she had her reasons. You can't help but have some empathy and sympathy for Esme's point of view. It's not just cut and shut that she ran off and left Charles to deal with everything, which is what he's thought for a long time. Charles had no idea that Esme was suffering from post-natal depression. He also had no idea that she was pregnant when she left."

In 2024, ahead of his hearing for dangerous driving, Ethan reveals to Charles that Esme has relocated to Brisbane and Naomi has joined her.

== Thomas Tate ==
Thomas Tate
- Emmerdale character
- Portrayed by: Bertie Brotherton
- Duration: 2021–present
- First appearance: Episode 9191; 28 October 2021
- Introduced by: Jane Hudson
In-universe information
- Father: Jamie Tate
- Mother: Gabby Thomas
- Stepfather: Vinny Dingle
- Half-sisters: Millie Tate
- Grandfathers: Frank Tate; Ashley Thomas
- Grandmothers: Kim Tate; Bernice Blackstock
- Uncles: Liam Hammond; Chris Tate; Caleb Miligan; Arthur Thomas
- Aunts: Zoe Tate; Thea Ramsden; Dee Dee; Dotty Thomas
- First cousins: Joe Tate; Nicky Miligan; Jean Tate; Noah Dingle
- Other relatives: Diane Sugden; Rodney Blackstock; Sandy Thomas; Nicola King; Angelica King

Thomas Tate, played by Bertie Brotherton, is the son of Gabby Thomas (Rosie Bentham) and Jamie Tate (Alexander Lincoln), who was conceived after a one night stand. Gabby discovered that she was pregnant in February, which she confided in her stepmother Laurel Thomas (Charlotte Bellamy). Over the course of her pregnancy, Gabby and Jamie constantly butted heads, and eventually Jamie made it clear he did not want to be a part of his son's life, which lead to him faking his death in September 2021, as well as to get back at his mother Kim Tate (Claire King).

After Thomas was born on 28 October 2021, Kim fought to be a part of Thomas' life and stop Gabby from moving to Portugal with her maternal grandmother Diane Sugden (Elizabeth Estensen), leading to her making a deal with Diane that she would sign 20% of what she owned to Gabby, which was worth approximately £4 million. Kim agreed providing the baby's last name was Tate. Gabby accepted this offer and named her son Thomas Tate.

== Hazel ==
Hazel
- Emmerdale character
- Portrayed by: Kate Anthony
- Duration: 2021–2022
- First appearance: Episode 9196; 3 November 2021
- Last appearance: Episode 9476; 26 September 2022
- Introduced by: Jane Hudson
In-universe information
- Daughters: Andrea Tate
- Granddaughters: Millie Tate

Hazel, played by Kate Anthony, is the mother of Andrea Tate (Anna Nightingale), who had recently been killed in the maze fire by Meena Jutla (Paige Sandhu). She first appears on 3 November 2021, when Charles Anderson (Kevin Mathurin) invites her to Andrea's funeral. Anthony's casting was announced on 25 October 2021. Daniel Kilkelly from Digital Spy described: "Kim's joy turns to horror when the person in question turns out to be Hazel, who has a big bombshell to drop."

Whilst she is in the village, she battles for custody of granddaughter Millie Tate (Willow Bell) with Kim Tate (Claire King), however Millie decides to move to Hampshire with Hazel, only to find her father Jamie Tate (Alexander Lincoln), who recently faked his death by driving into a lake, at Hazel's house, which was revealed to be a revenge plot against Kim. Hazel returns with Millie twice. First in April 2022 for the christening for her half-brother Thomas Tate (Bertie Brotherton) and again in September for Kim's wedding to Will Taylor (Dean Andrews).

== Gavin ==
Gavin
- Emmerdale character
- Portrayed by: Ben Richards
- Duration: 2021–2022
- First appearance: Episode 9216; 25 November 2021
- Last appearance: Episode 9266; 8 March 2022
- Introduced by: Jane Hudson
In-universe information
- Occupation: Loan shark Businessman

Gavin, played by Ben Richards, made his first appearance on 25 November 2021. Richards confirmed his casting on 7 October 2021 via Twitter, where he wrote that he was "chuffed" to be appearing on Emmerdale. It was later confirmed that Gavin would act as a villain on the soap and would be a business partner of Al Chapman (Michael Wildman). Richards was doing a gig on a ship when he learned of his audition for the role of Gavin and filmed his self-tape audition in a cabin. When he read the brief for the role, he felt that he knew exactly how to portray Gavin and felt that he was well written. He was also attracted to the role as he finds it "so much fun to play a baddie" since he felt that they are more interesting than nice characters. Digital Spy confirmed that Gavin was a recurring character and asked Richards if he would take on a regular role on the soap, to which he replied that if viewers want more Gavin, he would be happy to portray him for a longer tenure.

On his character, Richards said that Gavin has a lot of danger about him but is not brutal. He explained that Gavin is "clever and cultured – he's a modern-day gangster and doesn't get his own hands dirty if he wants something doing". When asked about his character's backstory, Richards said that Gavin grew up on a council estate in poverty but began a loan shark business through charging high interest rates. He said that Gavin has a number of customers who cannot lend money from a bank and hinted that people who do not pay him back end up in hospital. Richards said that when Al and Gavin interact, Al becomes "out of his depth" due to Gavin and his investors being very serious; he also hinted that Al and his relatives are in danger with Gavin. He also revealed that he had been filming with Jeff Hordley and opined that Gavin is a match for his character, Cain Dingle. He added that their scenes together are "explosive and really exciting to play".

== Alex Moore ==
Alex Moore
- Emmerdale character
- Portrayed by: Liam Boyle
- Duration: 2021–2023
- First appearance: Episode 9235; 20 December 2021
- Last appearance: Episode 9644; 5 April 2023
- Introduced by: Jane Hudson
In-universe information
- Sons: Lucas Taylor
- Daughters: Clemmie Reed

Alex Moore, played by Liam Boyle, is the ex-boyfriend of Dawn Taylor (Olivia Bromley) and the estranged father of their son, Lucas Taylor (Noah Ryan Aspinall). He reveals to Lucas that he is his father, and after initially showing anger, Dawn allows him to spend time with Lucas. As revenge on Dawn for taking her boyfriend, Meena Jutla (Paige Sandhu) wrongly informs Alex that Lucas lives in a dangerous household and to take action to protect him.

Alex returns again, when Dawn and Billy decide to go for custody of his daughter, Clemmie Reed (Mabel Addison), when Dawn discovers her sleeping in a dog basket in one of her old friend's homes. She was revealed to be the daughter of her friend, Beth Reed, who died from an overdose. After noticing a resemblance to Lucas, Dawn realises that Alex is Clemmie's father also, meaning he was having an affair with her best friend when they were together. In October, Alex returns to try and gain custody of both of his children, but ends up being tied up in a barn by Dawn's father Will Taylor (Dean Andrews) and stepmother Kim Tate (Claire King) and as a result is paid off.

He later returns and embarks on a false relationship with Naomi Walters (Karene Peter) due to Manpreet Sharma (Rebecca Sarker) dating Naomi's father. His intention is to steal drugs from the local doctor's surgery, where Manpreet works. Before Alex departed the series, he was involved in a hit and run story line, where he'd be run over by someone unknown, who was later confirmed to be Dawn's husband Billy Fletcher (Jay Kontzle).

== Other characters ==
Character	Episode date(s)	Actor	Circumstances
Mason	7 January	Noah Valentine	A drug dealer that Danny Harrington (Louis Healy) helps to sell drugs.
Fake Greg	3 February	Paul Hawkyard	A man that Mackenzie Boyd (Lawrence Robb) pays to pretend to be Greg (Frank Laverty), a business contact seeing Jamie Tate (Alexander Lincoln).
Greg	4 February	Frank Laverty	A business contact that Kim Tate (Claire King) meets with. He makes Gabby Thomas (Rosie Bentham) feel uncomfortable by flirting with her at the meeting. When Moira Dingle (Natalie J. Robb) storms into the meeting with a shotgun, he pulls out of the investment deal.
Kenny Cheadle	25 February	Ronnie Leek	The ex-boyfriend of Faith Dingle (Sally Dexter). When she discovers that he has been cheating on her, Faith steals a hearse from his undertaking business as revenge.
Private Investigator	9–25 March	Tom Colley	A private investigator that spies on Jimmy (Nick Miles) and Nicola King (Nicola Wheeler) after being hired by Juliette Holliday (Amelia Curtis).
Hot Dog	24–26 March	Dean Williamson	An affiliate of Connor Cooper's (Danny Cunningham) who works with Aaron Dingle (Danny Miller) and Mackenzie Boyd (Lawrence Robb) to sell stolen televisions.
Max	17 May	Will Barnett	A man that buys alcohol and condoms for himself and Liv Flaherty (Isobel Steele). Aaron Dingle (Danny Miller) arrives and interrupts the pair.
Airport Security	21 May	Vincent Davies	A security guard at an airport that notices Liv Flaherty's (Isobel Steele) drunken state. He tells Liv that she cannot board the plane to Dublin due to her drunkenness.
Tyson	24 May, 14 June	Jamie Redford	A friend of Sandra Flaherty's (Joanne Mitchell) who greets Liv Flaherty (Isobel Steele) when she arrives on their campsite.
Eddy	3 August–3 September	George Martin	A man that Ethan Anderson (Emile John) arranges a date with. The pair agree that they cannot see a relationship between them in the future, but agree to have sex. Eddy later interrupts Ethan's date with JJ (James McDowall) to inform him that his ex-boyfriend has HIV and that he may have transmitted it to Ethan. Eddy later informs Ethan that he is HIV-positive.
George	25–26 August	Callum McArthur	Two customers at the Hop who unknowingly test Liv Flaherty's (Isobel Steele) alcoholism by ordering alcoholic drinks from her. They later see her in the village and persuade Liv to get drunk with them.
Hannah	25–26 August	Joelle Rae	Two customers at the Hop who unknowingly test Liv Flaherty's (Isobel Steele) alcoholism by ordering alcoholic drinks from her. They later see her in the village and persuade Liv to get drunk with them.
JJ	25 August	James McDowall	A man who arranges a date with Ethan Anderson (Emile John), which is interrupted by Eddy (George Martin).
DS Rogers	24 September-9 March 2022	Matthew Flynn	A detective sergeant who investigates the disappearance of Jamie Tate (Alexander Lincoln), and the following month, investigates the death of Andrea Tate (Anna Nightingale). After Meena Jutla (Paige Sandhu) leads him to believe that Kim Tate (Claire King) is responsible for the murder, he arrests her. After Kim is released due to no evidence being found, DS Rogers and the police decide that there is not enough evidence to suggest Andrea was murdered. He later investigates the murder of Ben Tucker (Simon Lennon). After discovering footage of Liv Flaherty (Isobel Steele) attacking Ben, he assumes that she murdered Ben, and charges her for it. After Meena was finally caught out, Liv is released. Meena later frames Manpreet Sharma (Rebecca Sarker) for Andrea’s murder. Rogers questions Manpreet under caution, although she is later released.
Fiona Murphy	11 November-31 December	Yemisi Oyinloye	A woman who meets Nate Robinson (Jurell Carter) at a bar in Hotten and takes him back to her house. She tells him that she is on a break from her partner and the pair have a one-night stand. However, Nate was in a relationship with Tracy Metcalfe (Amy Walsh), who was suffering from post-natal depression. Fiona is later revealed to be the girlfriend of Vanessa Woodfield (Michelle Hardwick), who is the half-sister of Tracy. Fiona reveals that she had sex with Nate to Vanessa and Tracy, causing Tracy to leave the village with her and Nate's daughter Frankie (Eden Ratcliffe-Knights).
Justine Norris	11 November	Ceri Bostock	A journalist that interviews Aaron Dingle (Danny Miller) on the Hop's ongoing case of health and safety breaches. She attempts to talk to Ben Tucker (Simon Lennon) and Jai Sharma (Chris Bisson) for her piece, but they both decline involvement.
Carol Butler	24 December-14 April 2022	Laura Pitt-Pulford	The sister of Nadine Butler, who was murdered by Meena Jutla (Paige Sandhu) several years prior to her arrival in the village. Carol meets with Meena's sister, Manpreet Sharma (Rebecca Sarker), and tells her what Meena did to Nadine, which involved manipulating and isolating Nadine from her family and friends, leading to Meena murdering her. She warns Manpreet that Meena is dangerous. She later attends Meena's trial once she is arrested, but walks out after an outburst regarding the court not prosecuting Meena for Nadine's murder due to lack of evidence. Carol ends up smashing a mirror in a fit of rage, injuring her hand. When Meena is found guilty for her crimes, she throws a huge tantrum and Carol angrily confronts her in the courtroom. Meena mocks Nadine and says that Nadine was so irrelevant that she was not even charged for her death. Carol then furiously stabs Meena with a piece of glass from the broken mirror, but she survives, and Carol is arrested.
