= List of Emmerdale characters introduced in 2020 =

Emmerdale characters introduced in 2020

Emmerdale is a British soap opera first broadcast on 16 October 1972. The following is a list of characters that first appear during 2020, by order of first appearance. All characters are introduced by the soap's executive producer, Jane Hudson. The first character to be introduced was Harry Sugden (Brody and Teddy Hall), the son of Victoria Sugden (Isabel Hodgins) and Lee Posner (Kris Mochrie), followed by Cara Robinson (Carryl Thomas). DI Mark Malone (Mark Womack) first appeared in March, and Paul Ashdale (Reece Dinsdale) was introduced in April as the father of Vinny (Bradley Johnson). Ben Tucker (Simon Lennon) was introduced in September as a love interest for Aaron Dingle (Danny Miller), and Meena Jutla (Paige Sandhu) and Mackenzie Boyd (Lawrence Robb) made their debuts in September and October, respectively. In December, vicar Charles Anderson (Kevin Mathurin) was introduced. Additionally, multiple other characters appeared in 2020.

== Harry Sugden ==
Harry Sugden
- Emmerdale character
- Portrayed by: Brody and Teddy Hall (2020-2021); Adam Pryor (2022-present)
- Duration: 2020–present
- First appearance: Episode 8692/3; 1 January 2020
- Introduced by: Jane Hudson
In-universe information
- Family: Sugden
- Father: Lee Posner
- Mother: Victoria Sugden
- Grandfathers: Russell Posner; Jack Sugden
- Grandmothers: Wendy Posner; Sarah Sugden
- Uncles: Jackie Merrick; Robert Sugden; John Sugden; Andy Sugden (adoptive); Luke Posner
- First cousins: Sebastian White; Sarah Sugden (adoptive); Jack Sugden (adoptive)
- Other relatives: Annie Sugden; Joe Sugden

Harry Sugden is the son of Victoria Sugden (Isabel Hodgins), who was conceived when she was raped by Lee Posner (Kris Mochrie). He was born on New Year's Day 2020 and was originally played by Brody and Teddy Hall, before being taken over by Adam Pryor in 2022. Despite being conceived in horrific circumstances, Victoria decided to keep her baby, but feared that he would grow up to be like his father. However, when she held Harry after giving birth to him, she immediately fell in love with him.

After Harry's birth, his paternal grandmother Wendy Posner (Susan Cookson) wanted to meet him, but Victoria was anxious because initially she refused to believe that Lee raped her and her insistence that she was lying. When Harry was a month old, Victoria grew close to his uncle, Luke Posner (Max Parker), who then began to babysit Harry, which Wendy was delighted with. Eventually, Victoria allowed Wendy to look after him and the four grew quite close. On 23 March 2020, Harry was christened at a joint ceremony with Eve Dingle (Billy and Bonnie Clement) and Theo Metcalfe (Talitha Taylor and Eve Rowlinski).

== Cara Robinson ==
Cara Robinson
- Emmerdale character
- Portrayed by: Carryl Thomas
- Duration: 2020, 2025
- First appearance: Episode 8700; 9 January 2020
- Last appearance: Episode 10342/43; 17 July 2025
- Introduced by: Jane Hudson
In-universe information
- Occupation: Accountant
- Sons: Nate Robinson
- Granddaughters: Frankie Robinson

Cara Robinson, portrayed by Carryl Thomas, made her first appearance on 9 January 2020. Cara is introduced as the mother of established character Nate Robinson (Jurell Carter), who arrives in the village after receiving a voicemail from Moira Dingle (Natalie J. Robb) about the affair Moira had with Nate. Cara attempts to persuade Nate to leave the village with her, but he stays in Emmerdale. When Nate is accidentally shot by Cain Dingle (Jeff Hordley), she returns, suspicious of Cain and Moira. However, as he feels guilty over the affair, Nate covers for them by lying to Cara about what happened, saying he was shot by random farm hustlers, and she leaves again.

The character's backstory states that Cara was in a relationship with Cain, but Cain's stepfather (then believed to be his father), Shadrach Dingle (Andy Devine), detested the pair together due to his racism. Cara fell pregnant, and when Cain's mother Faith Dingle (Sally Dexter) found out, she persuaded her to leave. After having the baby, Nate, Cara made numerous attempts to contact Cain but Faith intercepted in an attempt to cover up what she had done.

In October 2020, it was announced that Thomas would be reprising her role, with Cara set to make her onscreen return later in the month. Carell told Digital Spy: "I don't know how long Cara is back for, but with the whole situation of Nate taking the rap for Belle, Tracy gets involved and wants to do the best she can to prevent that. She calls for Cara's help. Cara comes back to the village in the hope of changing Nate's mind. For how long who knows, but she's going to be making an appearance. That's amazing for me." He added: "Nate and Cara have a really strong relationship. Out of everyone, Nate's relationship with Cara is the strongest and most loving, as she is all he has had. There's a lot of legs with that relationship so it'll be interesting to see." Laura-Jayne Tyler from Inside Soap questioned why Cara was not a regular character, writing that she is "the best new character in years!"

== DI Dent ==
DI Dent
- Emmerdale character
- Portrayed by: Linda Armstrong
- Duration: 2020, 2026
- First appearance: Episode 8715; 27 January 2020
- Last appearance: Episode 10,491; 16 January 2026
- Introduced by: Jane Hudson (2020); Ian MacLeod (2026)
In-universe information
- Occupation: Detective Inspector; Police Officer
- Daughters: Ava

Detective Inspector Dent, portrayed by Linda Armstrong, is a police officer who investigated the murder of Graham Foster (Andrew Scarborough), who actually faked his death. She first appeared on 27 January 2020 alongside DS Ward (Simon Delaney), who was helping investigate Graham's faked murder at the hands of Pierce Harris (Jonathan Wrather). Upon her arrival fans recognised Armstrong from previous roles, including ITV long-running drama The Royal, with Justin Harp from Digital Spy saying: "Viewers will just have to wait and see if DI Dent can rely on some of Sister Brigid's divine intervention to catch Pierce Harris before it's too late!" Harp also described Armstrong: "With such an iconic role on her CV, it's no wonder some Emmerdale viewers were having flashbacks in Monday's episode."

On 16 January 2026, Dent reappeared after Graham's death was revealed to be fake during the Corriedale crossover episode. She arrives in Emmerdale after Joe Tate (Ned Porteous) hired a private investigator to see if Graham was still alive after seeing him in the hospital. She tells Joe that she could confirm that Graham was dead, but later called someone, presumably Graham, to say she had told Joe all he needed to know.

== DI Mark Malone ==
DI Mark Malone
- Emmerdale character
- Portrayed by: Mark Womack
- First appearance: Episode 8749; 5 March 2020
- Last appearance: Episode 8823; 19 August 2020
- Introduced by: Jane Hudson
In-universe information
- Occupation: Detective inspector

Detective Inspector Mark Malone, portrayed by Mark Womack, made his first appearance on 5 March 2020. Mark is a former colleague of Harriet Finch (Katherine Dow Blyton), and the boss of Will Taylor (Dean Andrews) former gang. Mark arrives in the village to investigate the shooting of Nate Robinson (Jurell Carter). He is later revealed to be a corrupted police officer, and he blackmails Will, Cain Dingle (Jeff Hordley) and Billy Fletcher (Jay Kontzle) into working for him, threatening their arrest if they do not comply. When he is reintroduced to Harriet, the two begin to have an affair behind Will's back. When he learns that Harriet and Will are set to get married, Mark attempts to frame Will for possession of drugs. When Will learns what he is trying to do, he attacks Mark by bludgeoning him with a spanner. After Mark threatens Dawn Taylor (Olivia Bromley), she reports him to the police. When Mark learns of Dawn's police report, he tries to force her to suicide with heroin, which is interrupted when Harriet bludgeons him over the head. He gets up and attempts to fight, until Dawn shoots him three times, killing him.

Upon the announcement of his casting, the Emmerdale Twitter account described him as a "police officer with a dark history". In an interview with Stephen Patterson of Metro, actor Womack talked about his character saying: "He likes messing with people's heads, especially Will's. I think he's generally just enjoys the whole game of it all. That's his thing, there's a bit of him that just enjoys manipulating people and getting them into situations and controlling people and that might be his downfall. He kind of loses control along the way and that might be what gets him." He hinted that Mark could be responsible for his own downfall, as well as the downfall of other characters, and added that he enjoys playing a villain. Talking to Inside Soap, Womack described Mark as "very dastardly", and stated that "you wouldn’t want to lock horns with him". He added: "Malone will stop at nothing to get what he wants and is very Machiavellian. Even though Malone's a policeman, he behaves in much the same way as the criminals he’s going after."

== Paul Ashdale ==
Paul Ashdale
- Emmerdale character
- Portrayed by: Reece Dinsdale
- Duration: 2020–2021
- First appearance: Episode 8777; 15 April 2020
- Last appearance: Episode 9100; 1 April 2021
- Introduced by: Jane Hudson
In-universe information
- Other names: Alex
- Occupation: Scrap dealer
- Sons: Vinny Dingle

Paul Ashdale, portrayed by Reece Dinsdale, made his first appearance on 15 April 2020. Upon his casting, it was revealed that Paul would have a connection to established characters Mandy Dingle (Lisa Riley) and her adoptive son, Vinny (Bradley Johnson). On his casting, Dinsdale commented "I'm absolutely delighted to be joining the cast of Emmerdale. Having recently directed a couple of episodes and seen at close quarters the superb work the cast, crews, and creatives produce, I can't wait to become part of the team once again – albeit in a different capacity." Paul is revealed to be the ex-partner of Mandy, as well as the biological father of Vinny. It has been suggested that Paul and Mandy will rekindle their relationship.

Upon his arrival in Emmerdale, Mandy sees him and confronts him. He asks to see Vinny, but Mandy states that she does not know of his whereabouts. However, when Paul sees Vinny in the village, he confronts him, using the alias Alex to befriend him. Mandy sees the pair together, and texts Paul from Vinny's phone, asking to meet him. When she meets with Paul, she insists that he should leave the village, until Vinny interrupts. When Vinny presses the pair, they admit that Paul is his father. Despite Mandy's mistrust of Paul, she allows the pair to see each other, and eventually, Paul rekindles his relationship with Mandy. Vinny discovers that Paul has a gambling addiction, and finds that Paul has stolen money from the Dingle family and a watch from Ellis Chapman (Aaron Anthony). Vinny asks him to attend an online addiction group, but when he discovers that Paul has not attended, he presses him to get help, and threatens to tell Mandy. Paul punches Vinny, and assaults him further while he is on the floor. Unwilling to tell Mandy, they claim that Vinny was the victim of a random assault.

Liv Flaherty (Isobel Steele) confronts Paul after she discovers his role in Vinny's beating. The two argue in a barn and Paul assaults her, first slapping her then repeatedly kicking her after throwing her the floor. Just as Paul goes to kick Liv again, Jimmy King (Nick Miles), blinded by sunlight, accidentally crashes his van into the barn. Liv is able to get to her feet and Paul begs her to help him as his legs are broken, Liv forces him to admit he beat up his son, but she then refuses and leaves. Paul then curses Liv and attempts to crawl out of the wreckage. Just as Liv is about to return, the barn explodes after a spark of flame hit gas canisters. Paul, Liv and Jimmy all become unconscious and are then rushed to hospital. This then results in Paul going into cardiac arrest from his injuries. Mandy begs the doctors to save Paul but they are unable to as he flatlines and dies.

Dinsdale was contracted on Emmerdale as a director, but was asked if he would play the role of Paul. Dinsdale enjoyed portraying Paul as he felt that Paul became "a fully rounded character" due to the arc given to him with abusing Vinny. He appreciated that writers did not make Paul villainous from his introduction, but rather "let his badness slowly bleed out". On Paul's death, Dinsdale stated that he was glad to leave "with a bang", and felt that his exit topped his exit as Joe McIntyre on the ITV soap opera, Coronation Street. COVID restrictions had an effect on the filming process of Paul's death stunt, which he described as "painstaking", due to the attention to detail and safety. Although it was confirmed that Emmerdale would be featuring the death of a character, the identity of the victim was unknown until the episode was transmitted. Dinsdale stated that he found it difficult to do interviews for the press for over a month without being able to say anything publicly. Despite this, he was "thrilled" that it was kept a secret. Following his onscreen exit, Dinsdale continued working on Emmerdale as a director.

== Ben Tucker ==
Ben Tucker
- Emmerdale character
- Portrayed by: Simon Lennon
- Duration: 2020–2021
- First appearance: Episode 8842; 22 September 2020
- Last appearance: Episode 9216; 3 December 2021
- Introduced by: Jane Hudson
In-universe information
- Occupation: Activities leader
- Father: Warren Tucker

Ben Tucker, played by Simon Lennon, made his first appearance on 22 September 2020. Upon his casting, Lennon expressed his excitement to be appearing on Emmerdale, stating that he feels lucky to be a part of the soap. He expressed his excitement for viewers to see what unfolds for Ben. When Ben's character details were announced, it was confirmed that he is a figure from Aaron Dingle's (Danny Miller) past and that the pair become reacquainted when Aaron sees Ben working at a café he visits. Lennon was nervous about his first day and found the set to be much larger than he anticipated, with assistant director Val Lawson giving him a tour of the set. When asked what his favourite thing about Ben is, Lennon replied that he admires Ben's passion for what he believes in, as well as that Ben is confident in his own abilities and is not afraid to show his vulnerability.

Lennon noted that Ben and Aaron "have a lot of history and it will all come to the forefront when they're reunited after a long time apart". It was later confirmed that Aaron bullied Ben at school for his homosexuality, but since Aaron's realisation that he is gay, Jess Lee of Digital Spy noted that their reunion "could result in a romance developing between them". Lennon admired that Ben is assured within himself in spite of his childhood, which he accredited in part to people like Aaron who bullied him. Miller, who portrays Aaron, stated that due to the history of bullying, Ben finds it quite hard to accept and move on with, but confirmed Aaron will attempt to make it up to Ben.

When Liv Flaherty (Isobel Steele) sees Ben accompanying a drunk man home, she informs Aaron, who questions Ben on who the man is. He later reveals that the man, Warren (Steve Marsh), is his alcoholic father. Ben reveals that he has given his father lots of money to pay for bills, which Warren spent on drinking. The loans left Ben struggling for money and led to him sleeping in one of the cabins at his workplace. Lennon explained that Ben has grown up around his father being drunk, and as a result, knows a lot about the trauma and struggle involved in alcoholism.

On 25 November 2021, Ben is killed by Meena Jutla (Paige Sandhu) in previously unannounced scenes. Her motive for the murder is that Ben unearths footage of Meena attempting to murder Victoria Sugden (Isabel Hodgins); when she discovers that he has the footage, she fights him for the camera and after attaining it, she strikes him over the head with an oar. As he gasps for help, she fatally strikes him with the oar a second time.

== Meena Jutla ==
Meena Jutla, played by Paige Sandhu, made her first appearance on 24 September 2020. Meena is the estranged sister of established character Manpreet Sharma (Rebecca Sarker), who comes to the village to reconcile her relationship with Manpreet. It was also confirmed that she would be a love interest for Billy Fletcher (Jay Kontzle). On her casting, Sandhu commented: "Meena is such a fun and complex character to play and I'm really looking forward to seeing how people react to her". Speaking to Digital Spy about her character, Sandhu stated that if she was "watching someone play this character", she "wouldn't like the character", and that Meena is "going to annoy some people" and "likes to wind people up, especially women, and flirt with men". She noted that Meena will make enemies in the village, since there is a "selfish side" to her. She added: "Meena comes to the village because she wants a reconciliation with Manpreet, but there's always some selfish reason behind all she does".

In June 2021, it was confirmed that Meena would be Emmerdale's next villain. After Meena's murder of Leanna Cavanagh (Mimi Slinger), Yasmine Leung of HITC noted that she has "left quite the impression on viewers". Leung noticed that fans of the soap had praised Sandhu for her portrayal of Meena and that they had become invested in the storyline due to her acting skills. Despite some viewers wanting Meena gone from the soap due to disagreeing with her actions, Leung herself admitted that she loves Meena and enjoys seeing her "psycho, unpredictable nature" as it incites drama on the soap. Metro's David Brown echoed Leung's comments, opining that she could become a "top soap serial killer" and "could go down in the soap history books". Since murdering Leanna, Meena has killed Andrea Tate (Anna Nightingale) and Ben Tucker (Simon Lennon). For her portrayal of the role, Sandhu won the award for Best Villain at the 2021 Inside Soap Awards.

== Mackenzie Boyd ==
Mackenzie Boyd
- Emmerdale character
- Portrayed by: Lawrence Robb
- Duration: 2020–present
- First appearance: Episode 8876; 29 October 2020
- Introduced by: Jane Hudson
- Crossover appearances: Corriedale (2026)
In-universe information
- Mother: Ann Boyd
- Sisters: Moira Dingle
- Wife: Charity Dingle (2023–present)
- Sons: Reuben Harris
- Stepsons: Ryan Stocks; Noah Dingle; Moses Dingle
- Stepdaughters: Leyla Sugden
- Nephews: Matty Barton; Isaac Dingle

Mackenzie Boyd, played by Lawrence Robb, made his first appearance on 29 October 2020. Mackenzie was introduced as the brother of established character Moira Dingle (Natalie J. Robb). Duncan Lindsay of the Metro wrote that his arrival means Moira's "life is set to be turned upside down". On being cast in the role of Mackenzie, Robb stated that he is "absolutely thrilled" and that he "has had so much fun playing around with the character already". Robb added that he is completely different to his character, so portraying him "will no doubt have its challenges".

On Mackenzie's relationship with Moira, Digital Spy wrote: "Mackenzie had a close bond with his sister Moira when they were growing up together. Sadly, their time together came to an abrupt end when a surprising turn of events led to Moira leaving the family home forever." Actor Robb added that while growing up, his character "had it drilled into him that something happened and that's why Moira left". He explained that this led to Mackenzie having a "preconceived idea of who she's become" prior to arriving in the village. However, when he arrives, Moira informs him that it is different to what he believes. Actress Natalie J. Robb, who portrays Moira, praised the decision to bring Mackenzie into the programme. She stated that the decision was "talked about for quite a while really, and it was just knowing when the right time was going to be".

In August 2025, it was reported that Robb would be leaving that soap and that Mackenzie would be killed-off in a storyline where he is murdered by John Sugden (Oliver Farnworth). A source revealed, "Mack has survived quite a lot over the years but his time is well and truly up this time. What his exit does is set the stage for an exciting next stage to John's saga later in the autumn that will leave fans quite literally on edge". On 29 August, it was shown that Mackenzie wasn’t killed off and that John kidnapped him.

== Connor Cooper ==
Connor Cooper
- Emmerdale character
- Portrayed by: Danny Cunningham
- Duration: 2020–2021
- First appearance: Episode 8884/5; 10 November 2020
- Last appearance: Episode 9006; 26 March 2021
- Introduced by: Jane Hudson

Connor Cooper, played by Danny Cunningham, is a man who Paul Ashdale (Reece Dinsdale) borrows money from so that he can gamble. When Paul fails to win his bets, Connor begins threatening him to get his money back. The debt comes to £4000, and in order to get the money quickly, Paul arranges for Connor to pretend to hold him hostage. Connor demands £4000 ransom from Mandy in return for Paul. However, after Mandy only delivers a portion of the money and threatens to kill him, Connor continues to threaten Paul. Liv Flaherty (Isobel Steele) sees Connor and questions him on what Paul has done; Connor confesses everything to her.

Connor appeared again on 16 January 2021, when he went to the scrapyard to demand for more money from Paul. Upon his reappearance, Lucy Needham from The Mirror reported that fans recognised Cunningham from other soap roles. Needham also described Connor to "cut a menacing figure" when approaching Paul in the scrapyard.

== Charles Anderson ==
Charles Anderson
- Emmerdale character
- Portrayed by: Kevin Mathurin
- Duration: 2020–present
- First appearance: Episode 8925; 25 December 2020
- Introduced by: Jane Hudson
In-universe information
- Occupation: Vicar
- Father: Victor Anderson
- Mother: Claudette Anderson
- Wife: Esme (backstory)
- Sons: Ethan Anderson
- Daughters: Naomi Walters

Charles Anderson, played by Kevin Mathurin, made his first appearance on 25 December 2020. Charles is introduced as a new vicar in the Emmerdale village, when struggling vicar Harriet Finch (Katherine Dow Blyton) phones him to ask if he can perform the honours at Chas (Lucy Pargeter) and Paddy Kirk's (Dominic Brunt) wedding. Digital Spy stated that Charles would be a "hit" with other villagers, and that be would "provide great support to Harriet".

Charles' character and casting details were announced on 26 November 2020, alongside that of his onscreen son, Ethan (Emile John). It was stated that when his son Ethan is accused of a crime he did not commit, Charles' "intense need to fight injustice" leads to a rivalry with the established Dingle family. On his casting, Mathurin commented: "The show has always been a family favourite and my mum is a huge fan. The cast and crew have all been so welcoming and I am really looking forward to Charles' storylines in the Village." Producer Sophie Roper stated that Emmerdale were delighted to be welcoming Mathurin to the soap and noted the "dynamic new father and son duo" will "send shockwaves through the village as they find themselves embroiled in the heart of a thought-provoking story with one of our most loved families", referring to the Dingle family. She added: "With two actors of such great calibre, they're certainly set to make their mark on the Dales."

Charles meets with ex-wife Esme (Eva Fontaine), who informs him that the pair have a daughter together, Naomi Walters (Karene Peter). Naomi's backstory involves being put up for adoption by Esme, who was cheated on by Charles and suffered from postpartum depression. Esme and Naomi later met up, but Charles had never met his daughter since he declined on getting to know her. Charles learns that Naomi has gone missing, and feeling responsible for her, he hunts for her. He discovers her working in a bar, arguing with her boss. Charles defends her in the argument and knocks her boss over. On the scenes where Naomi meets her father, Peter said: "Charles is there and has been looking for her, unbeknownst to her. He's been watching this interaction between her and her manager take place and it escalates to the point where he intervenes. In that intervention, he blurts out that Naomi is his daughter. So that kind of shocks her to the core a little bit. She doesn't know how to react to it in that moment." Mathurin explained that Charles did not plan on revealing that he was Naomi's father in that way, but afterwards, he affirms that he wants to get to know her. However, due to Charles being an empathetic character, he would go at the pace Naomi allows the relationship to go at, and if she did not want to know Charles, he would respect that.

== Other characters ==
Character	Episode date(s)	Actor	Circumstances
DS Ward	27 January–4 March	Simon Delaney	A detectives investigating the murder of Graham Foster (Andrew Scarborough).
Carol	26 March–27 April	Susan Mitchell	Experienced foster parents who take care of Lucas (Dexter Ansell) while he is away from his mother Dawn Taylor (Olivia Bromley).
Ted	26 March–27 April	Matt Lanigan	Experienced foster parents who take care of Lucas (Dexter Ansell) while he is away from his mother Dawn Taylor (Olivia Bromley).
Masseuse	13 April	Luke Delaney	A masseuse who massages Eric Pollard (Chris Chittell).
Ricky	1 June–1 July	Max Dowler	A restaurant owner that flirts with Moira Dingle (Natalie J. Robb).
Gaz	10 August	Kem Hassan	A man who boasts about going on a date with Leyla Harding (Roxy Shahidi), having met her on a dating app. When he meets with her, she does not know who he is, and insists that the dating profile set up in her name is fake, and forces a disgruntled Gaz to leave.
Gwyn	22 October	Jon-Paul Bell	The best man of a groom who meets with Gabby Thomas (Rosie Bentham) to discuss wedding plans.
