= Naomi Walters =

Fictional character from Emmerdale

- Emmerdale character
- Portrayed by: Karene Peter
- Duration: 2022–2023
- First appearance: Episode 9388; 14 June 2022
- Last appearance: Episode 9723; 6 July 2023
- Introduced by: Jane Hudson
In-universe information
- Occupation: Bartender; Chef
- Father: Charles Anderson
- Mother: Esme
- Brothers: Ethan Anderson
- Grandfathers: Victor Anderson
- Grandmothers: Claudette Anderson

Naomi Walters is a fictional character from the ITV soap opera Emmerdale, played by Karene Peter. After making an uncredited appearance on 14 June 2022, she began appearing regularly the following month. She was introduced as the estranged and difficult daughter of Charles Anderson (Kevin Mathurin) whose first major storyline sees her involved in an attack against village local Nicola King (Nicola Wheeler). The reaction from locals sees her ostracised, but despite their distaste for her, Naomi's characterisation remains bolshy and argumentative.

Throughout her tenure, Naomi is shown to be a feisty, stubborn and strong-willed character. She has various feuds, including spats with her family, Manpreet Sharma (Rebecca Sarker), Rhona Goskirk (Zoë Henry) and her bosses at the Woolpack. She is also conned by Alex Moore (Liam Boyle), which shows a vulnerable side to Naomi when she is devastated by his lies. Peter announced her decision to leave Emmerdale in April 2023, with her exit airing on 6 July 2023. Viewers were not a fan of Naomi, with many being unappreciative of her nasty nature. However, Metro writer Sue Haasler appreciated that she is "a headstrong young woman who insists on making her own decisions in life".

== Casting and characterisation ==
Channique Sterling-Brown was among the actresses to audition for the part of Naomi, but Karene Peter was ultimately chosen for the role. Peter made an uncredited appearance as Naomi on 14 June 2022, with her first credited appearance airing on 5 July 2022. Peter said it was surreal to be joining Emmerdale due to having watched the soap as a child. She felt like she had been "transported into [her] TV". She was cast by Faye Styring, Emmerdale's casting director, who knew she Peter would make an impact on the series. Naomi was introduced as the daughter of established characters Charles (Kevin Mathurin) and Esme (Eva Fontaine), and the younger sister of Ethan (Emile John). Naomi was initially referenced on the soap in October 2021 when Esme mentions her to Charles. Her backstory involves being put up for adoption by Esme, who was cheated on by Charles and suffered from postpartum depression. Esme and Naomi later met up, but Charles had initially refused to meet her.

On her character, Peter said that Naomi has "got a bit of an edge and she's a little bit misunderstood". She is "a troubled and troublesome soul" who is going through an angsty and rebellious period at the point of her introduction. Peter clarified this is nothing to do with her being adopted. She said that Naomi's adoptive family are caring and that she grew up in a loving family unit. When she arrives on the series, she does not make many friends due to her argumentative nature. Peter opined that the reason for Naomi's rebellious streak comes from abandonment issues with her biological parents. She explained that while Naomi's relationship with Esme had improved from when they first met, it was not the "rose-tinted, fairytale, mother/daughter relationship" that she wanted. Esme believes that she is closer to Naomi than she actually is. Charles initially not wanting to know Naomi had also given her a bad impression of him.

== Development ==
=== Relationship with her father ===
When Charles learns that Naomi has gone missing, he feels responsible for her disappearance so he hunts for her. He discovers her working in a bar, arguing with her boss. Charles defends her in the argument and knocks her boss over. On the scenes where Naomi meets Charles, Peter said: "Charles is there and has been looking for her, unbeknownst to her. He's been watching this interaction between her and her manager take place and it escalates to the point where he intervenes. In that intervention, he blurts out that Naomi is his daughter. So that kind of shocks her to the core a little bit. She doesn't know how to react to it in that moment." Mathurin explained that Charles did not plan on revealing that he was Naomi's father in that way, but afterwards, he affirms that he wants to get to know her. However, due to Charles being an empathetic character, he would go at the pace Naomi allows the relationship to go at, and if she did not want to know Charles, he would respect that.

Charles makes "an emotional call" to Naomi trying to establish a relationship, which results in Naomi arriving in Emmerdale village. She meets him and Ethan, demands money, tels them to delete her number and carry on pretending she was never born. Her vulnerable side is briefly shown when she admits that "she's never fit in anywhere" and feels that she would complicate their life. She then leaves. However, Digital Spy confirmed that she would be returning to the soap after she establishes an off-screen relationship with brother Ethan. Naomi returns and argues with Charles, after which his partner, Manpreet Sharma (Rebecca Sarker), finds him unconscious. She reports Naomi to the police and she is arrested, despite being innocent. This causes a feud between the pair.

=== Attack against Nicola King ===
In August 2022, Naomi shows more of her nasty side when she threatens Manpreet to not get involved in her life in a "flicker of rage". This led viewers to begin theorising that Naomi was involved the attack of Nicola King (Nicola Wheeler), which aired in June of that year. The theory was later confirmed as it transpires that Naomi witnessed the attack and did nothing to help. When Nicola recognises her, Naomi does not, as she has blocked the traumatic night from her memories. Speaking from her character's perspective, Peter explained that she wants a place of belonging and temporarily found it with the girls who attacked Nicola. However, she did not support the attack and Peter clarified that Naomi does feel guilty due to not doing anything to help.

Naomi does not initially admit her involvement to anyone due to not wanting to be ostracised. Writers paired her in scenes with Nate Robinson (Jurell Carter) and confirmed that they would become a romantic couple. Naomi is shown to be very confident and flirty whilst pursuing Nate and he falls for her charms quickly. However, Nate hears of the attack and this causes a rift between them. The Anderson family also see a backlash from the community due to siding with Nicola. After admitting her role that night and apologising for not doing anything to help, she is met with hostility rather than forgiveness. Her response leaves "a lot to be desired" as she remains argumentative and self-defensive to the villagers who challenge her. Naomi is eventually arrested for grievous bodily harm when her former friends pin the blame on her and set her up. She considers running away but is stopped by Nate and her family. She is "touched" by their support and decides to battle the investigation.

A court trial is held, which Naomi is apprehensive for. The issue has "become so much more serious than she ever imagined" and knowing what her former friends are capable of, she has fears of going to prison. Peter enjoyed filming in the courthouse due to it feeling like a legitimate. She explained that it felt "very authentic and visceral watching it all unfold". She was glad the storyline had climaxed in a court trial and agreed that Nicola deserved justice for what happened to her. She admitted that playing Naomi, who has questionable emotions and decisions in the storyline, had been a challenge for her.

=== Feuds and encountering Alex Moore ===
"I think part of her would definitely want revenge. I don't know if her family would let her do anything, but she'd want revenge. I think Naomi would be torn, as she is a misunderstood soul. I think she'd feel devastated more than angry, but I'm sure there'd be a part of her that would want to get Alex back for what he's done."

— Peter on Naomi's reaction to Alex's lies.

At the end of 2022, Digital Spy wrote that Naomi would be set for a "turbulent" 2023. Marlon Dingle (Mark Charnock) hires her as an assistant chef at the Woolpack. After interacting with his daughter April Windsor (Amelia Flanagan), her first feud of the year begins with Rhona Goskirk (Zoë Henry), April's stepmother. April goes from her usual kind self to having arguments and getting secret piercings. Nicola turs Rhona against her, who "uses Naomi as a scapegoat". She confronts Naomi, which results in a physical altercation where Marlon takes Naomi's side. Naomi dumps Nate due to finding him boring. Naomi, who lives with Nate and Ryan Stocks (James Moore), misses her rent several times due to partying and relies on Ryan to cover it. She is gently told by Marlon that she cannot rely on him, to which she furiously decides to move out. She lies to Charles and Manpreet about needing to move out and away from her ex, who soon find out that she is lying, but decide to take her in. Digital Spy's Justin Harp remarked that she would have to "give up her partying lifestyle".

In February 2023, it was announced that Emmerdale producers had decided to reintroduce villain Alex Moore (Liam Boyle) as part of a storyline for Naomi. Naomi goes on a date with Alex, "oblivious to the problems that she might be getting herself into by associating herself with Alex", which worries her father and brother. They begin a relationship despite their fears and Naomi feuds with them in his defence, due her "stubborn and strong-willed" ways. Naomi gets with him due to wanting an adventure and to "spice up her love life" after her boring encounter with Nate. She also uses him as a way to goad and test Charles' patience. Producers soon confirmed that their relationship is a sham. It transpires that Alex is trying to get close to Manpreet due to her work as a doctor at the surgery, which Alex wants to steal medication from.

Peter said that if her character knew the truth, she would be angry and embarrassed due to her defending him. She said: "Naomi will feel very let down that she was played by this guy, who has drawn her in and used his charm to get her on side." When asked if Naomi wants revenge after it is revealed, Peter said that despite the view of her, Naomi is a "misunderstood soul". Although there is a part of Naomi that wants revenge after the truth is revealed, she is more sad than angry.

=== Departure ===
On 25 April 2023, a day after the casting announcement of Naomi's grandmother Claudette (Flo Wilson), it was announced that Peter had quit her role as Naomi. A spokesperson said that Peter had enjoyed her time on Emmerdale, but due to wanting to play different roles, she had made the decision to leave. Radio Times reported that her exit would be set to air in summer 2023. After her short but "eventful" tenure on the soap, it was confirmed that her exit would be written in a way that could accommodate her return in the future. No details were given about her exit at the time, but Leeds Live wrote that it would be "major".

In the lead-up to her exit, Naomi gets to know grandmother Claudette, as well as fellow newcomer, grandfather Victor (Eddie Osei). Naomi getting to know Victor infuriates Charles, since he is an ex-prisoner who Charles detests. The Metro hinted that Victor could have something to do with Naomi's exit and worried what it would do to Charles. Her final weeks become "calmer waters relationship-wise" in scenes that see her paired with Vinny Dingle (Bradley Johnson). She is accused of giving Victor free pints at work and in a fury, has an argument with her bosses and quits. Victor influences Naomi by telling her that she should take money from Vinny to start a new life. Naomi then made her exit from the village on 6 July 2023.

Mathurin posted a tribute to Peter following her departure from the soap. He stated that although Naomi was always written to be a problem for Charles, he felt Peter had portrayed Naomi in a way that made viewers instead sympathise with Naomi. He added: "You are a beautiful human being who knows her path. I really admire that. Stay on it. You’re definitely heading in the right direction. PEACE MI DAWTA!" Peter responded to Mathurin's post, expressing her admiration for him.

== Reception ==
Metro's Sue Haasler described Naomi as "a feisty character with quite a temper", as well as "a headstrong young woman who insists on making her own decisions in life". Leeds Live writer Phoebe Fuller called Naomi a "nasty, grumpy" person and likened her to serial killer Meena Jutla (Paige Sandhu). Viewers echoed Fuller's comments, describing her as dangerous and "a horrible character [who] thinks the world revolves round her". Naomi proved to be more unpopular after her feud with Manpreet, with viewers having "well and truly had enough of her". Her involvement in Nicola's attack further fuelled dislike towards Naomi, with viewers calling for the "nasty and unlikeable" character to be axed.

Viewers "were left exasperated" after Naomi's lies to Charles and Manpreet about her reasons for moving out. She was described as a "grade A sponger who spends all her money on a good time". Sarah Smith, writing for Entertainment Daily branded Naomi "a selfish liar". Others were entertained by her nasty nature and wished for her to become a serial killer. After Alex's lies to Naomi are revealed, viewers believed that her reaction was out of character. They found her to be unusually gullible and stupid and noted that she should not have believed him.
