= Liv Flaherty =

Fictional character from Emmerdale

Liv Dingle
- Emmerdale character
- Portrayed by: Isobel Steele
- Duration: 2016–2022
- First appearance: Episode 7434; 25 February 2016
- Last appearance: Episode 9506; 28 October 2022
- Introduced by: Kate Oates
In-universe information
- Father: Gordon Livesy
- Mother: Sandra Flaherty
- Adoptive father: Aaron Dingle (legal guardian)
- Stepfather: Robert Sugden (legal)
- Half-brothers: Aaron Dingle; Sebastian White (legal)
- Husband: Vinny Dingle (2022)

Liv Dingle (also Flaherty) is a fictional character from the ITV soap opera Emmerdale, played by Isobel Steele. The character made her first on-screen appearance on 25 February 2016. Liv was introduced as part of her half-brother Aaron Dingle's (Danny Miller) sex abuse storyline, which would see her realise that her father is a sex offender. Liv was initially characterised as a troublemaker, but her depth was explored following the decision to move in with Aaron. Steele has noted that similar aspects of her character are similar to herself, and appreciates that Emmerdale wrote her as a teenage with authority since she felt that this is rarely seen on television. Liv became the first asexual character to be featured in a British soap opera, and Steele has been praised by viewers and critics for her role in the storyline. Asexual people felt that the character was an accurate portrayal of themselves and Steele has expressed her gratitude at being able to represent them on-screen.

As well as her asexuality, Liv's storylines have seen her become an alcoholic, be imprisoned for spiking Lisa Dingle's (Jane Cox) drink with ketamine, form relationships with Jacob Gallagher (Joe-Warren Plant) and Vinny Dingle (Bradley Johnson), be diagnosed with epilepsy, expose numerous criminals for their behaviour and be wrongly imprisoned for the murder of Ben Tucker (Simon Lennon). Within months of her debut appearance, Steele was nominated for the British Soap Award for Best Newcomer. She was then nominated for three further Newcomer awards, winning one at the TVTimes Awards. Steele has also been awarded two awards for Best Young Actor. Claire Lindsay of Metro labelled Steele "an Emmerdale stalwart in the making", with Chloe Timms of Digital Spy stating that Liv has forged a meaningful place on the soap, accrediting this to Steele's "vulnerable performances" in her issue-led storylines.

The character was killed-off on 19 October 2022 after being crushed by a caravan during a storm to celebrate Emmerdale's 50th anniversary.

== Casting and characterisation ==
Steele's casting was announced on 16 February 2016, and it was confirmed that her first appearance would air on 25 February 2016. Emmerdale producers made the decision to introduce "teenage troublemaker" Liv as part of her half-brother Aaron Livesy's (Danny Miller) sex abuse storyline. Steele said that she likes her character and that she sees several aspects of herself in Liv. She described Liv as "very strong willed and quite powerful", and liked that Liv is a difficult character to intimidate. Steele felt that having a teenage character with authority is good for Emmerdale to show, since teenagers are usually portrayed as "timid and easy to intimidate". She felt that over her tenure, Liv has become "a character in her own right", and expressed her gratitude at having the role. As well as showing strong tendencies, Liv's "softness and vulnerability" has also been explored by the soap.

== Development ==
=== Introduction ===
Liv first appears when Aaron hunts for evidence on Gordon Livesy (Gary Mavers), Liv and Aaron's father, since he sexually abused Aaron. Aaron and his boyfriend Robert Sugden (Ryan Hawley) arrive at Liv's house to confront her mother Sandra Flaherty (Joanne Mitchell), and while they are standing outside, Liv steals Aaron's wallet. Miller stated that his character's introduction to Liv "isn't a great start", but noted that viewers would be able to see an instant bond form between the pair. He described Liv as "cheeky and a bit naughty", and likened the character to his own at his age. Aaron does not tell Sandra about Liv stealing his wallet, as he "instantly loves her" and wants to protect her. Liv sees Aaron confronting Sandra and pinning her against a wall, which "breaks her heart". Sandra refuses to stand in court for Aaron, and although Liv does not initially believe Aaron, she soon realises that Gordon is lying. Sandra states that she will be moving to Dublin with Liv. It becomes "increasingly clear" that Liv wants to stay in Emmerdale, Aaron offers to become her full-time guardian. Sandra accepts and allows Liv to live with Aaron. Executive producer Iain MacLeod stated that Liv will challenge Aaron and Robert's relationship, accrediting this to Liv not getting on with Robert and wanting Aaron's attention.

=== Asexuality ===
In October 2017, Liv begins to struggle with her sexuality. Gabby Thomas (Rosie Bentham) makes a remark that Liv is not into boys, so in retaliation, she kisses Gerry Roberts (Shaun Thomas). She then opens up to Belle Dingle (Eden Taylor-Draper) and tells her that she is not into boys or girls. She tells Belle that it would be easier if she liked Gerry, but that she "has nothing" romantically. This led viewers to believe that Liv is asexual, and Digital Spy confirmed that if she is asexual, it would "mark new ground" for Emmerdale due to never having had an asexual character prior to this. Producers announced their plans for Liv to have a "big storyline", and in January 2018, Daniel Kilkelly of Digital Spy wrote that they are "taking their time delivering it". Kilkelly also suspected that the storyline would be based around Liv's asexuality hints from October. Later in January, Miller confirmed in an interview with Kilkelly that they were filming the aforementioned storyline at that point in time. He revealed that there would be a point in the storyline where his character advises Liv, as Aaron had been through something similar. However, he noted that Liv may not "allow him in to talk to her about that kind of stuff." Miller opined that Liv is similar to Aaron, and that both he and Steele worked hard on making their mannerisms similar for the purpose of the storyline.

In March 2018, it was announced by Digital Spy that Emmerdale would be revisiting Liv's asexuality storyline. Scenes continue to show Liv struggling to put a label on her sexuality, as she becomes concerned when she feels no sexual attraction to males nor females. Liv sets Gabby up on a date with classmate Jacob Gallagher (Joe-Warren Plant), but Jacob assumes that Liv is the person who likes him. Liv opens up to Gabby about her lack of attraction to people, and despite supporting her, Gabby assumes she is just picky. Speaking on the storyline, Steele stated that she enjoyed being involved in the storyline since it had never been done on a soap opera before. She felt that it was important to portray asexuality particularly due to its rarity on television. Steele noted that she was well informed on asexuality prior to filming the storyline, but confirmed that she looked into real people's stories to gauge their opinions on certain topics. Eventually, she opens up to Aaron, who tells Liv that there is no rush to label herself, and that it is normal to not know since she is young. Steele noted that this was not easy for her character to do, and that it takes a "bit of goading". The actress noted that despite usually being open with Aaron, it was understandable for Liv to not want to talk about her asexuality with Aaron since it is a personal topic. Steele added that Liv invested herself in Aaron's relationship with Robert as a way to not focus on her own problems.

=== Alcoholism and imprisonment ===
In March 2018, it was announced that Liv would be seen "getting into trouble" after a prank involving Gabby becomes "out of control". MacLeod described Steele as "super-talented and a rare find", and stated that the production team conjured the "quite big and dark" storyline to explore Steele's acting talents. Liv and Gabby steal a vial of ketamine from vet Vanessa Woodfield (Michelle Hardwick) with intentions of spiking Daz Spencer's (Mark Jordon) drink. However, Liv accidentally spikes Lisa Dingle's (Jane Cox) drink, who collapses and goes into cardiac arrest. Speaking on the storyline, Steele explained that her character has a "better perspective of how things can go wrong" unlike Gabby, who she described as "very immature". She opined that Liv did not want to carry out the prank, but Gabby's "nasty streak" makes her character feel pressured to please Gabby and fit in. Since Gabby feels guilty for Liv's involvement, she takes the blame, which Steele noted has "quite the effect" on Liv. Liv's struggle with guilt causes her to drink more alcohol than usual, as she feels responsible for a "massive betrayal". A member of the Dingle family informs the police of Liv's involvement, and she is questioned by the police, and Liv then admits to spiking Lisa's drink. Miller explained that Aaron becomes terrified that Liv will be imprisoned, especially due to her asexuality. Since Aaron's homosexuality was a target for him in prison, he "knows what it's like to be inside and the possibilities of drugs". Liv is then charged with theft and administering a noxious substance, which "adds to the fears that she could end up behind bars". The backlash Liv faces from almost everybody around her causes her to turn to alcohol on several occasions, and Kilkelly wrote that her drinking could become a problem. At her court hearing, Liv's representative is swapped at the last minute, and she is given a man who has not prepared. Liv hopes that Lisa will be able to speak for her, but her new lawyer does not bother to phone her. Due to her anxiety, Liv is not able to make an apology; since Gabby has apologised, it "paints Liv in a bad light". Duncan Lindsay, writing for the Metro, stated that since Liv is secretly battling with an alcohol dependency, it would be difficult for her to cope in prison.

Liv is sentenced to four months in a youth detention centre. Following her sentencing, "viewers' worst fears were finally confirmed" when it was revealed that Joe Tate (Ned Porteous) is responsible for her lawyer being swapped. This was due to Joe wanting to make Aaron vulnerable for a business deal. Liv repeatedly affirms to Aaron that she is fine in the unit, but when he visits her, she opens up about her alcohol problem. Aaron vows to be supportive of Liv, but Lindsay wrote that it "may prove easier said than done" due to being in prison. When Liv is in prison, Gerry is killed, which leads her to be "overcome with sadness over her loss". Following her release from prison, Aaron becomes worried that she will not be able to cope. Liv gives Terry (Daniel Casey) a comic strip drawn by Gerry, and Lachlan White (Thomas Atkinson), who murdered Gerry, realises that it incriminates him. Liv begins a cat and mouse situation with Lachlan when she notices that he is hiding something. She texts him threatening messages anonymously, and Atkinson stated that although his character is initially unaware of who is sending the messages, Liv is in danger. He explained that Liv "doesn't really know what Lachlan is capable of", as Liv believes he is only responsible for a robbery rather than Gerry's murder. Lachlan realises that Liv is responsible for the text messages when he sees her acting suspiciously with a phone. Emmerdale then listed Liv as a potential victim of Lachlan, who becomes "grimly satisfied" when he believes that he has killed her by breaking the carbon monoxide detector at her house and deliberately causing a gas leak. Liv survives and blames Lachlan for her potential death, but nobody believes her. As a result, Liv begins drinking again in a "heartbreaking twist".

=== Relationship with Jacob Gallagher ===
In October 2018, Steele told the Daily Mirror that Liv would be getting a love interest. She confirmed that the asexuality storyline would be revisited as part of Liv's new connection, when she "fancies someone and she wants to spend time with this person but she has to explain that she's not sexually interested in them". She expressed her interest in the story since "for some boys [sex is] all it's about!" Steele explained that the storyline results in Liv "reiterate how she feels towards relationships and sex and explain it all again to people she thought understood". She added that it was interesting since Liv's asexuality was last mentioned six months prior to that point in time, and viewers were afraid that it would not be revisited. The love interest was later confirmed to be Jacob. Maya Stepney (Louisa Clein) is grooming Jacob, and he tries to pressure Liv into having sex so that he can lose his virginity to impress Maya. The pair reconcile and go on a date, where the pair share a "poignant moment" when Jacob assures Liv that he understands that their relationship will have a lack of sex. Their date is ruined by Aaron when he embarrasses Liv, assuming that the pair are about to have sex, which leads Liv to open up to Aaron about her asexuality again. Jacob later learns that Maya is responsible for telling Aaron about their date. As part of Jacob being groomed by Maya, she "drags Liv Flaherty into her games" by telling him to form a relationship with Liv that acts as a cover for their secret and illegal bond. Maya sees Jacob ignore a call from Liv, and tells him to "keep up appearances", so he arranges a date for the pair of them. Liv becomes excited about their growing relationship, unaware that she is being used. Maya tells Jacob that they can be together after he has finished school, so he dumps Liv in retaliation. Jacob goes home, and a confused Liv follows him to question him. She hears a female voice from inside his bedroom, and Liv's "worst fears were confirmed" when he leaves the room half-naked. She pushes past him into his bedroom, where she sees Maya. Liv then rushes off in shock.

Maya confronts Liv, who tries to explain that Jacob has an obsessive crush on her. However, Liv likens Maya to her father Gordon, who she labels a "sick perv". Maya tells her that she will use Liv's history of alcoholism against her if she speaks out, but Liv demands £5000 for her silence. Liv gets "cast-iron proof" of Maya's grooming in the form of an audio recording of the pair, which leaves Maya worried that she will expose her. When Maya is unable to raise the money, Liv doubles it, asking for £10,000. Despite wanting the money for Aaron and Robert's surrogacy plan, Liv fears the person she is becoming and admits everything to Gabby. Liv later tells David Metcalfe (Matthew Wolfenden) and Leyla Harding (Roxy Shahidi), who "rebuke" her for not telling them sooner. Aaron later discovers her "ruthless behaviour", but forgives her due to her good intentions. Following Maya being exposed, Steele hinted that her character may be the only one that is able to comfort Jacob. She explained that due to their "special relationship", Liv would be able to show him the understanding and empathy that he requires to "piece his life back together". Steele expressed her joy in being involved in the storyline, and enjoyed working closely with Clein and Plant.

=== Epilepsy and involvement with the Ashdales ===
In August 2019, Liv suffers from a "scary seizure". Due to Robert being imprisoned, Aaron runs away, and knowing his history of self harm and depression, she tries to find him. She retraces his steps to the woods, and "an unexpected twist which casts a shadow on Liv's fate" occurs when she has a seizure. Metro wrote that since Steele had not announced her departure from the soap, Liv would likely survive the seizure. She is found by Wendy Posner (Susan Cookson) who rushes her to hospital, where she has an "emotional conversation" with Aaron about his mental health. The doctors are unable to diagnose her formally, but state that if her seizures continue, her life may be impacted largely, which finds difficult to come to terms with. Entertainment Daily described the storyline as a "horrifying ordeal" for Liv since she becomes worried that she will have more seizures. Emmerdale worked with the British charity Young Epilepsy for the storyline, who advised them how epilepsy affects young people. Chief executive Mark Devlin found it fantastic to work with the soap, and appreciated that the storyline could highlight the various symptoms of epilepsy.

In June 2020, scenes suggested that Vinny Ashdale (Bradley Johnson) has formed an attraction to Liv. Vinny tells his father Paul Ashdale (Reece Dinsdale) that he has a crush on Liv, and he sets up a dinner date for the pair. Johnson stated that Vinny sees a similarity to himself in Liv, since both of their guardians have made the teens mature and wise. When asked if there is potential of them forming a relationship, Johnson replied that it's possible if his mother Mandy Dingle (Lisa Riley) "can keep her nose out and lets them have a chance together!" After Mandy attempts to matchmake the pair but "gets her wires crossed in regards to Liv's asexuality", Liv is "destroyed" by her comments. Vinny apologises on her behalf, and he arranges a date with her. However, he is forced to stand Liv up when he learns that Paul, a recovering gambling addict, has been gambling again. Reassured that Paul has stopped gambling, Vinny moves in with Liv to ensure his father's recovery process runs smoothly. However, Liv discovers that Paul is still gambling. Afraid that Mandy and Vinny will discover his gambling, Paul threatens Liv to stay quiet. However, Liv has a sudden seizure. With Liv wanting to keep her epilepsy a secret and Paul determined to hide his gambling, the two agree to keep each others' secrets.

Liv accuses Paul of being a bad father due to making Vinny lie for him. He follows her home, and Liv becomes "terrified" when he locks her inside her house with him. She has a seizure due to the stress Paul causes her, and when she regains consciousness, he tells Liv that he will inform Aaron of her two recent seizures. Liv responds with a threat, telling him that she will reveal his gambling if he informs Aaron. Steele noted that she was interested to see their relationship "put to the test" with the secret, but hoped that they would continue to develop. Paul learns that Liv is adamant on learning to drive, and informs Aaron of her seizures due to the risk they may pose when driving. As a result, Liv informs Vinny of his gambling. After suffering from another "deadly" seizure, Liv is diagnosed with epilepsy. Steele was excited to see Liv's change in confidence following her diagnosis. Due to his heavy gambling debts, Paul forms a "sickening plan against Liv" when he learns that she owns her own property. He pretends to have been kidnapped by Connor Cooper (Danny Cunningham) so that Liv will pay the ransom for his debts.

Liv becomes suspicious of Paul's behaviour following the successful fake kidnapping, and Dinsdale hinted that Liv is in danger by being suspicious of his character. He described Liv as "the thorn in Paul's side" since she is unhappy with the relationship he has with Vinny. Steele opined that Liv is talented at knowing when somebody is acting strangely, but admitted that she is not great at knowing the exact issue. As a result, Liv knows that "something's off with the relationships" but does not know what exactly is happening. Liv is unaware that Vinny is being physically abused by Paul, and Steele said that the reality has not "even crossed Liv’s mind". After Vinny is hospitalised, Liv suspects that Paul is involved. However, Vinny defensively turns it around on Liv. Steele explained that Vinny does this because he is smart, and that "Liv looks like someone who's lost her mind" due to the accusations she makes. This "drives a wedge" between Liv and Vinny, but Steele clarified that Vinny does love her and is manipulating her to protect her. Paul tells Vinny to end his relationship with Liv and he obeys out of fear. Steele noted that it leaves her character devastated, since she finds it difficult to trust people which makes it especially hard to understand. However, despite her upset, Steele said that Liv knows there is more to his behaviour than a breakup, and that Paul is involved. This leads Liv to figure out the truth rather than "wallowing in the heartbreak". She hinted that Liv digging to find out the truth would leave her in danger, specifically with Paul. Liv confronts Paul in a barn on his wedding day to Mandy and openly accuses him of abusing Vinny. He lashes out at Liv, throwing her into a glass table and kicking her repeatedly. Whilst beating her, Jimmy King (Nick Miles) drives a lorry into the barn which causes it to collapse on the pair. Liv tries to help Paul get out from under a beam, but when the barn sets on fire, she leaves him. The barn explodes just as Liv makes it outside, and she collapses from the impact. After she learns that Paul has died in the barn, a "battered and bruised" Liv informs Mandy of his gambling and abuse of Vinny.

=== Departure ===
In October 2022, it was announced that Steele had made the decision to leave Emmerdale after six years to focus on her music career. The Metro said that Liv is set to die in the soap's 50th anniversary week, the premise of which focuses on a deadly storm. Liv was killed off during the episode broadcast on 19 October 2022 to celebrate Emmerdale's 50th anniversary.

== Reception ==
In 2016, Steele was nominated for four awards in the Newcomer category; the British Soap Awards, the TV Choice Awards, the Inside Soap Awards, and the TVTimes Awards, the latter of which she won. In 2017, she was nominated for Best Young Actor at the British Soap Awards. A year later, she was nominated again and won the award. She then won Best Young Actor at the 2018 Inside Soap Awards.

Liv's asexuality has been widely praised by viewers of the soap. When hints that she could be asexual aired in October 2017, Digital Spy wrote that viewers were happy to see Emmerdale "tackling an under-explored subject", and they expressed their hope that she would be confirmed as asexual. When the storyline was revisited, viewers continued to praise the soap for its portrayal of asexuality, since it "is rarely covered on television". Viewers appreciated that Emmerdale continued to visit her identity and praised them for "highlighting an LGBTQIA character". Asexual people have expressed their joy with Liv, since they felt that they could relate to her. Steele stated that she had received a lot of feedback on the storyline on Twitter. She recalled having numerous people tell her that Liv's asexuality being represented on television was important to them. Steele said that she had received comments from both asexual and unlabelled individuals, which she appreciated since Liv's experience showed "someone who's not in an A or B category". Steele has also earned praise for her acting capabilities when her character has seizures, with Digital Spy noting that viewers were concerned for Liv during her first seizure.

Following Liv's role in exposing Maya as a groomer, Chloe Timms of Digital Spy wrote a piece praising both the character and Steele. Timms acknowledged that upon her introduction, Liv "seemed every bit your troublesome teenager", but that immediately, there was a lot to explore with her character. She noted that at the beginning of Liv's tenure, she was embroiled in a powerful issue-led storyline with Gordon's grooming, but that Liv "managed to hold her own alongside huge fan-favourite characters". Timms liked that despite the storyline being largely centred on Aaron, viewers could also see the impact that the revelations of her father's crimes had on Liv too. Due to this introductory storyline, Timms labelled Liv as "multi-layered and conflicted" from the start, and was impressed by Steele's "emotionally-charged performances". Timms stated that due to being connected to a popular character such as Aaron, she could have struggled to be a highlight, and opined that writers initially "were set on moulding Liv into a mini-Aaron". However, she wrote that Liv has "forged her own personality" after her years on the soap. She accredited this to Liv's numerous issue-led storylines which showcased Steele's "vulnerable performances" as Liv. Timms liked that Liv has been shown to be a versatile character who has matured over her tenure, and that she has formed enduring connections with various characters including Douglas Potts (Duncan Preston), Gabby, Aaron and Robert. Contrasting to this, Timms appreciated that Liv is "not afraid" to make enemies in the village, noting her rivalries with Lachlan and Maya. Timms loved Liv's role in Maya's grooming storyline. She felt that since Liv showed both "tentative and relatable teenage worries about dating" and a "massive moral dilemma", it was a surprising arc for the character. Timms wrote that the story proved that Liv is "more than capable of leading a storyline", and noted that Emmerdale have "set a precedent for her involvement" in big storylines. She also liked seeing her in scenes with characters that she would not typically interact with. Timms billed Liv "a rising star for the future", and expressed her excitement to see how the character is utilised in the future.

In a Metro piece on the "12 female soap stars of the future", Claire Lindsay listed Steele. She wrote that from her introduction, Liv had her "forced to sit up and take notice of the screen". Lindsay appreciated Liv's depth, referring to storylines such as learning about her father's crimes and forming relationships with other characters on Emmerdale. She also highlighted Liv for being the first asexual character on a soap. Lindsay concluded with a nod to Steele's diverse acting capabilities, and billed her as "an Emmerdale stalwart in the making".

== See also ==
- List of Emmerdale characters (2016)
- List of LGBT characters in soap operas
- Media portrayal of asexuality
