= List of Emmerdale characters introduced in 2019 =

Emmerdale characters introduced in 2019

Emmerdale is a British soap opera first broadcast on 16 October 1972. The following is a list of characters that appear during 2019, by order of first appearance. All characters are introduced by the soap's executive producer, Jane Hudson. The first character to be introduced is Vinny (Bradley Johnson), the adoptive son of Mandy Dingle (Lisa Riley), followed by Bear Wolf (Joshua Richards), the biological father of Paddy Kirk (Dominic Brunt), in February. Will Taylor (Dean Andrews), the father of Dawn Taylor (Olivia Bromley), and Nate Robinson (Jurell Carter), a farmhand, were introduced in April. Jamie Tate's (Alexander Lincoln) family, consisting of wife Andrea Tate (Anna Nightingale) and daughter Millie Tate (Willow Bell), made their debuts in June. Wendy Posner (Susan Cookson), the mother of Lee Posner (Kris Mochrie), first appears in July, followed by Al Chapman (Michael Wildman) the father of Ellis Chapman (Asan N'Jie/Aaron Anthony) in August. September features the introductions of Danny Harrington (Louis Healy) and Derek (Tommy Cannon) in guest stints. Additionally, multiple other characters were featured during the year.

== Vinny Dingle ==
Vinny Dingle
- Emmerdale character
- Portrayed by: Bradley Johnson
- Duration: 2019–2026
- First appearance: Episode 8358; 4 January 2019
- Last appearance: Episode 10,675; 12 October 2026
- Introduced by: Jane Hudson
In-universe information
- Other names: Vinny Ashdale
- Occupation: Scrap dealer
- Father: Paul Ashdale
- Mother: Tina Dingle
- Adoptive mother: Mandy Dingle
- Stepfather: Paddy Dingle (adoptive)
- Wife: Liv Flaherty (2022); Gabby Thomas (2025–2026)
- Stepsons: Thomas Tate
- Grandfathers: Zak Dingle
- Grandmothers: Nellie Dingle
- Uncles: Cain Dingle; Sam Dingle
- Aunts: Belle Dingle
- First cousins: Debbie Dingle; Nate Robinson; Samson Dingle; Kyle Dingle; Isaac Dingle
- Other relatives: Chas Dingle; Marlon Dingle; Charity Dingle; Sarah Sugden; Aaron Dingle; Leyla Sugden

Vinny Dingle, played by Bradley Johnson, first appears on 4 January 2019. The character and Johnson's casting details were announced on 28 December 2018. Vinny is introduced as the 16-year-old son of Mandy Dingle (Lisa Riley), who returns after a 17-year absence, having lived in Southampton with her son. Riley explained that Vinny is similar to Mandy, creating "a lot of scope" and big stories. The actress praised Johnson and enjoyed working with him, describing the prospect of Vinny's future stories as exciting.

Since Mandy had sex with her former husband Paddy Kirk (Dominic Brunt) before leaving in 2001, it is suggested that he could be Vinny's father. Allison Jones of Inside Soap predicted that the identity of Vinny's father could "blow the Dingles apart". When Paddy meets Vinny, he does not question if he could be his son. Brunt confirmed that the writers had not decided how to conclude the story. Lucy Pargeter, who portrays Paddy's partner Chas Dingle, thought that Vinny's paternity could "go in any direction" and could have implications for Paddy's relationship with her son Aaron Dingle (Danny Miller).

Vinny departed in the episode broadcast on 8 January 2019. Following his exit, Daniel Kilkelly of Digital Spy described Vinny as "bumbling and awkward" and thought he resembled Paddy, believing the character's parentage would be a good storyline in the future. Kilkelly enjoyed Johnson's portrayal of Vinny and thought that there was scope for Vinny to be "a great character in his own right", adding that the soap was missing "a comic young male presence" following the death of Gerry Roberts (Shaun Thomas).

When Vinny discovers that Samson Dingle (Sam Hall) has pawned a wedding ring that belonged to Samson's dead mother, Vinny covers for him so that Sam Dingle (James Hooton) is not upset. When Sam threatens to throw Vinny out, Samson reveals that it was him. Upon confiding in Sam, Samson and Lydia Hart (Karen Blick), he reveals that Mandy is not his birth mother, but his stepmother, and that Paul Ashdale (Reece Dinsdale) is his father. Vinny became an official Dingle after drinking out of the welly boot on Sam and Lydia's wedding. However, his real last name was revealed after Mandy stated Paul's last name was Ashdale.

In 2024 It was revealed that Tina Dingle Is his biological mother.

== Bear Wolf ==
Bear Wolf (otherwise known as "Edward"), played by Joshua Richards, first appears in February 2019. The character was referenced on-screen during January 2019 episodes, where it was suggested that he could be the father of Paddy Kirk (Dominic Brunt) following an affair with Paddy's mother. Richards' casting details were announced on 15 January 2019. Bear is introduced when Paddy's partner, Chas Dingle (Lucy Pargeter), and friend, Marlon Dingle (Mark Charnock), encourage him to meet him in Belfast at a wrestling convention. He is billed as a "ageing pro wrestler". Multiple members of the Emmerdale cast filmed scenes in Northern Ireland for Bear's introduction. Richards expressed his delight at joining the cast and filming in Yorkshire. He added that Bear is "a great character".

== Gail Loman ==
Gail Loman
- Emmerdale character
- Portrayed by: Rachael Gill-Davis
- Duration: 2019, 2023–2025
- First appearance: Episode 8449; 19 February 2019
- Last appearance: Episode 1,0286; 7 May 2025
- Introduced by: Jane Hudson
In-universe information
- Occupation: Kitchen Assistant; Barmaid
- Sons: Oscar Grisham

Gail Loman, played by Rachael Gill-Davis is the girlfriend of Ryan Stocks (James Moore). She originally appears in one episode, 19 February 2019, when she goes on a date with Ryan. They share a kiss, but she ends up mortified when she finds out that he is attracted to Dawn Taylor (Olivia Bromley). Just over four years later, Gail reappears in Emmerdale on 25 May 2023. At first Ryan is very sceptical of why she has come back after four years of no contact, however they end up dating again. Gail ends up getting a job as a kitchen assistant in The Woolpack, but ends up fulfilling a barmaid position instead, after Marlon Dingle (Mark Charnock) fired her.

In September 2023, it was revealed that her and Ryan had more history together than that one date in 2019. On 21 September 2023, it was revealed that in 2010, Gail gave birth to a son named Oscar (Harley Hamilton), who was adopted by a lady named Sophie Grisham (Martha Cope), and Ryan is his father. Sophie has made contact with Gail because Oscar, now thirteen years old, has been diagnosed with aplastic anemia and needs a bone marrow transplant. Therefore, Gail gets tested to see if she is a match. After she has been tested, Gail agrees to meet Oscar, who isn't upset about being put up for adoption as Sophie has given him a good life. On 4 March 2025, it was announced that Gill-Davis would leave the series. A source told The Mirror that Gill-Davis wanted to "spread her wings." The source also said: "Rachael has loved her time on the show but it’s time to go. Bosses felt the character wasn’t inspiring much story and so it was all very amicable. The door has been left open but it’s a definite goodbye for now. Rachael is looking forward to spreading her wings and showing off her talents on other shows." She left On 7 May 2025

== Will Taylor ==
Will Taylor
- Emmerdale character
- Portrayed by: Dean Andrews
- Duration: 2019–2025
- First appearance: Episode 8449; 17 April 2019
- Last appearance: Episode 10185; 9 January 2025
- Introduced by: Jane Hudson
In-universe information
- Occupation: Mechanic; Groundskeeper
- Wife: Rose Jackson (backstory); Kim Tate (2022–2024;void)
- Daughters: Dawn Taylor
- Stepsons: Jamie Tate
- Grandsons: Lucas Taylor; Evan Fletcher

Will Taylor, portrayed by Dean Andrews, first appears on 17 April 2019. Andrews' casting details were announced on 21 January 2019, but further details about the character, including his name, were embargoed until his first appearance. Will is the father of established character Dawn Taylor (Olivia Bromley) and the former partner of Harriet Finch (Katherine Dow Blyton), who was an undercover police officer during her marriage to Will and assisted in his arrest. The character is also introduced as a rival for Cain Dingle (Jeff Hordley). Andrews expressed his delight at joining the cast of Emmerdale, which executive producer Jane Hudson also reiterated. She praised his performances and teased that he would "shake things up" for some characters. Andrews later admitted that he found it hard to keep his role a secret and looked forward to exploring the character.

Prior to his introduction, Harriet began being tormented by an unknown person. When Dean arrives, it emerges that Will is the tormenter and he and Dawn are working together to get revenge on Harriet for sending Will to prison. Andrews told Daniel Kilkelly of Digital Spy that Will is resentful towards Harriet for sending him to prison, partly because it meant he became estranged from Dawn. The actor wanted to explore Will's emotional state. Dow Blyton observed that Harriet does not expect to see Will again and explained that Will and Dawn "want her to suffer as much as they have; they want to ruin her life." The actress added that Harriet would try to "reach out" to Will after discovering he is responsible because she naturally seeks the best in people.

== Nate Robinson ==
Nate Robinson
- Emmerdale character
- Portrayed by: Jurell Carter
- Duration: 2019–2025
- First appearance: Episode 8457; 25 April 2019
- Last appearance: Episode 10263/4; 10 April 2025
- Introduced by: Jane Hudson
In-universe information
- Occupation: Farmhand; Farmer
- Father: Cain Dingle
- Mother: Cara Robinson
- Stepmother: Moira Dingle
- Half-brothers: Kyle Dingle; Isaac Dingle
- Half-sisters: Debbie Dingle
- Wife: Tracy Metcalfe (2023–2024)
- Daughters: Frankie Robinson
- Grandfathers: Zak Dingle
- Grandmothers: Faith Dingle
- Uncles: Sam Dingle; Caleb Miligan
- Aunts: Chas Dingle; Belle Dingle
- Nephews: Jack Sugden
- Nieces: Sarah Sugden
- First cousins: Aaron Dingle; Samson Dingle; Eve Dingle; Nicky Miligan
- Other relatives: Charity Dingle; Noah Dingle; Mandy Dingle; Marlon Dingle

Nate Robinson, portrayed by Jurell Carter, made his first appearance on 25 April 2019. The character was introduced during the Big Night Out week of episodes, where he shares a kiss with Rhona Goskirk (Zoë Henry). He later secures a job working on Moira Dingle's (Natalie J. Robb) farm and pursues a relationship with Amy Wyatt (Natalie Ann Jamieson). He later begins a sexual affair with Moira behind Amy and Cain Dingle's (Jeff Hordley) backs. After Cain learns of the affair, he takes Moira and Nate out on a boat to confront them. As he and Nate fight, Nate reveals that he is Cain's son. Months later Nate is accidentally shot by his father Cain. Nate later makes up to his family after the revenge scheme on his father. After Moira's hit-and-run accident, Nate takes the blame for the incident after Belle was charged with 4 offences. Nate was given a 2-year suspended sentence and an 80-hour community order along with a 6-month driving ban.

Nate begins a casual relationship with Tracy Metcalfe (Amy Walsh) in February 2020 and after she discovers she is pregnant Nate pledges to stand by her and they become a proper couple. Tracy gives birth to their daughter Frankie in February 2021 but after suffering in silence for months she is diagnosed with post-natal depression after she attempts to take her own life, admitting herself to a psychiatric ward in order to get the help she needs. Nate struggles to adapt as a single father but soon receives support from Cain. When Tracy returns to the village the couple struggle to get back on track as Nate finds it hard to leave Tracy on her own with Frankie should she find it difficult to cope. Their relationship hits crisis point in December 2021 when Tracy discovers Nate's one-night stand with Fiona Murphy (Yemisi Oyinloye), the new girlfriend of her half-sister Vanessa Woodfield (Michelle Hardwick). Unable to forgive him, Tracy accepts a job offer in Nottingham and leaves with Frankie the following month, devastating Nate in the process.

After a one-night stand with Chloe Harris (Jessie Elland) in April 2022, Nate is pursued by Naomi Walters (Karene Peter) and they begin a relationship in August 2022. This is met with adversity from the village as it transpires Naomi witnessed the attack on Nicola King (Nicola Wheeler) and has refused to cooperate with the police and name the attacker. Despite a kiss with Tracy, Nate remains with Naomi as she settles into life at the village. However, she eventually leaves when she decides Nate and life in the village is too boring for her. Nate and Tracy quickly reunite and marry, although this ends sharply when it is revealed at Belle Dingle (Eden Taylor-Draper) and Thomas King's (James Chase) wedding in February 2024 that Tracy has been having an affair with Nate's uncle, Caleb Miligan (William Ash). Although Nate tries, he cannot forgive his wife and they separate, eventually forming an amicable co-parenting relationship.

In September 2024, Tracy and Nate grow close again and agree to give things another try. They happily plan a move to Shetland together, with Frankie, where Nate has been offered a job. Tragedy strikes, however, when Moira - who, unbeknownst to everyone, is suffering from a brain tumour - makes a misguided pass at Nate, which he immediately rebuffs. When Cain and Tracy discover this, they wrongly believe Moira and Nate have reignited their affair, despite Nate's protests otherwise, and Moira is unable to clearly explain what happened. Cain violently attacks Nate and disowns him, while Tracy refuses to move to Shetland and tells Nate they are over. A devastated Nate disappears off-screen, with Tracy and Cain learning soon afterwards of Moira's tumour and subsequently Nate's innocence. Despite attempts to reach out, Nate ignores all contact.

In February 2025, a limousine driven by Charity Dingle (Emma Atkins) crashes into a frozen lake, instantly killing Suzy Merton (Martelle Edinborough) and later Leyla Harding (Roxy Shahidi). While crossing the lake, Amy falls beneath the ice. As she sinks under the water, she sees a wrapped and chained body with an arm broken loose and a decayed hand wearing a friendship bracelet - identical to one Amy wears, which was made by Frankie. While Tracy manages to rescue Amy from underneath the ice, Amy suffers from hypothermia and is admitted to hospital. Amy awakens briefly and tries to tell her husband Matty Barton (Ash Palmisciano) that she saw Nate's body in the water, however before she can finish, she flatlines and dies. Tracy is seen to make a call to Nate, saying that she does not know why he would answer now when she hasn't heard from him in months, begging him to get in touch. Nate's body remains underneath the ice and a figure in a black hoodie is seen watching after the limousine is recovered.

That April, John Sugden (Oliver Farnworth) is revealed to have killed Nate after he was beaten up by Cain. On his way out of the village, Nate had run into John, who suffered from hero syndrome and tried to "save" him by giving him a sedative. Unfortunately Nate suffered an adverse reaction to the sedative and died, so John, desperate to cover his tracks, threw Nate's body into the lake. Everyone besides John is unaware of what happened to Nate. In June, after the lake is dredged following a slurry leak caused by John, Nate's body is found and subsequently identified. Cain and Tracy both grieve and accuse each other of killing Nate. However, after the funeral, they put their differences aside and work together to find out who killed him. The entire family, including Cara, attends Nate's funeral.

Prior to filming on Emmerdale for the first time, Carter said that he prepared to meet the cast by watching interviews online. Talking about his character, Carter stated that "Nate is a very loyal character" who "definitely does like the ladies", and that he is a "young jack the lad type of guy". On Nate's rivalry with father Cain, Carter explained that Nate is "physically big plus he's mentally a strong character and very streetwise", and a " great match for Cain". He also revealed that prior to appearing in a scene that required Nate to swim, Carter had to learn to swim in real life. Following viewers' dislike for Nate, Carter spoke out about hurtful comments he has received as a result of his character, explaining that "lines were blurred and it became a bit personal". Due to the online comments being made about him, he "made the decision not to even look" at what was being said.

== Andrea Tate ==
Andrea Tate
- Emmerdale character
- Portrayed by: Anna Nightingale
- Duration: 2019–2021
- First appearance: Episode 8493; 3 June 2019
- Last appearance: Episode 9185; 21 October 2021
- Introduced by: Jane Hudson
In-universe information
- Occupation: Wedding Planner
- Mother: Hazel
- Husband: Jamie Tate (until 2021)
- Daughters: Millie Tate

Andrea Tate, played by Anna Nightingale, first appears on 3 June 2019. The character and Nightingale's casting details were announced on 28 May 2019. Andrea is introduced as the wife of Jamie Tate (Alexander Lincoln), alongside their daughter Millie Tate (Willow Bell). She also becomes a new rival for Jamie's mother, Kim Tate (Claire King). Lincoln billed Andrea as fiery, "less innocent than Jamie", and protective of Jamie. He added that Andrea is not as "manipulative" as Kim, but she will "not [...] take any nonsense from [Kim]". Nightingale also teased her character's romantic side, describing her as "a harmless flirt [who] loves her husband". Lincoln thought Andrea's characterisation made her an "interesting" character. Nightingale enjoyed working with her on-screen family and hoped that writers would place Andrea in friendships with Leyla Harding (Roxy Shahidi), Tracy Metcalfe (Amy Walsh), Rhona Goskirk (Zoe Henry) and Priya Sharma (Fiona Wade). Imogen Groome, writing for the Metro, predicted that Andrea's arrival would create "some explosive drama". On 27 September 2021, Nightingale announced she was pregnant with her second child and would be leaving Emmerdale. She made her final appearance on 21 October 2021 when she is murdered by serial killer Meena Jutla (Paige Sandhu).

Prior to the character's introduction, she was not referenced; Lincoln explained that Jamie does not mention his wife because he "wanted to keep his wife and daughter away from everyone in the village". Andrea and Jamie's marriage is strained upon her arrival as he has ignored her attempts at contact in the previous weeks. Lincoln did not believe that Jamie intentionally ignored his family, but also pointed out that Jamie failed to tell Andrea about what he was doing in the village. Jamie wants Andrea and Millie to relocate to the village, so gets Andrea a job and moves the family into Home Farm, which Lincoln said would create "a bit of conflict".

In their fictional backstory, Andrea and Jamie have been married for five years and met at university in Liverpool. It soon emerges that after Kim asked Graham Foster (Andrew Scarborough) to look after Jamie when she was imprisoned, Graham employed Andrea to do the job, having met her in a local bar. However, when Andrea fell in love with Jamie, she cut contact with Graham and he had not seen her since. Nightingale noted that when she and Graham meet again, Andrea understands that her disappearance has "repercussions". She also pointed out that Graham is a "pretty terrifying" character who Andrea should be afraid of.

Andrea clashes with Kim after scaring one of her horses, leaving Jamie "stuck in the middle of some awkward conversations". Kim is surprised to discover that Jamie has a family, which does not ease the tension between Andrea and Kim. Lincoln observed that Kim thinks "Jamie can do much better". Due to Jamie and Kim's estranged relationship, Andrea does not expect him to be close with his mother. Lincoln thought that Andrea was "annoyed" by Kim's presence in Jamie's life considering their history, but Nightingale explained that although Andrea feels "secure" in her marriage, she is also "cautious" of Kim. Lincoln added that Jamie becomes "stuck between these women" as they both want the best for him. Laura-Jayne Tyler of Inside Soap predicted "plenty of spiky showdowns between [Andrea] and her overbearing mother-in-law!"

== Millie Tate ==
Millie Tate
- Emmerdale character
- Portrayed by: Willow Bell
- Duration: 2019–2022
- First appearance: Episode 8493; 3 June 2019
- Last appearance: Episode 9476; 26 September 2022
- Introduced by: Jane Hudson
In-universe information
- Father: Jamie Tate
- Mother: Andrea Tate
- Half-brothers: Thomas Tate
- Grandfathers: Frank Tate
- Grandmothers: Kim Tate; Hazel
- Uncles: Chris Tate; Caleb Miligan
- Aunts: Thea Ramsden
- First cousins: Nicky Miligan; Joe Tate; Noah Dingle; Jean Tate

Millie Tate, played by Willow Bell, first appeared on 3 June 2019. The character and Bell's casting details were announced on 28 May 2019. Willow is introduced as the five-year-old daughter of established character Jamie Tate (Alexander Lincoln) and Andrea Tate (Anna Nightingale), the latter of whom she is introduced with. Lincoln billed Millie as "a bossy one" who further complicates Jamie's life. Writers did not mention Millie and Andrea prior to their introduction to create a surprise for the audience when they discovered Jamie had a family. Millie and her family move into the Home Farm estate, where Jamie's estranged mother, Kim Tate (Claire King), lives. Lincoln explained that Jamie wants Millie to grow up in the village. Kim struggles with Millie's existence as she did not expect to be a grandmother. On this, Lincoln commented, "Kim really doesn't like being called grandma. She hates it!"

In 2021, two separate storylines see the death of Millie's parents; Jamie is said to have died through driving through a river and Andrea is killed by Meena Jutla (Paige Sandhu). this leads to Millie's custody being given to Kim, until Millie's other grandmother Hazel (Kate Anthony) arrives. It was confirmed by Digital Spy that Anthony had been cast for Millie's exit storyline, which sees her choose to live with Hazel rather than Kim. It is then revealed that Jamie is alive and that he had been secretly working with Hazel to regain custody of Millie, which they succeed with. Carena Crawford of Entertainment Daily opined that Millie should have stayed with Kim instead of going with Hazel. They felt that Millie's bond with Kim should have swayed her decision, writing: "she would never give up on granddaughter Millie [...] to just allow Hazel to take her away when the chance to keep her for good was being handed to her on a plate is VERY unlike Kim Tate."

== Lucas Taylor ==
Lucas Taylor
- Emmerdale character
- Portrayed by: Dexter Sol Ansell (2019–2021); Noah Ryan Aspinall (2021–present)
- Duration: 2019–present
- First appearance: Episode 8518; 27 June 2019
- Introduced by: Jane Hudson
In-universe information
- Father: Alex Moore
- Mother: Dawn Taylor
- Adoptive father: Billy Fletcher
- Half-brothers: Evan Fletcher
- Half-sisters: Clemmie Reed
- Grandfathers: Will Taylor
- Grandmothers: Rose Jackson

Lucas Taylor, originally played by Dexter Ansell, currently played by Noah Ryan Aspinall, is the son of Dawn Taylor (Olivia Bromley) who is taken away from her when she becomes addicted to drugs. She later regains custody of him. His estranged father, Alex Moore (Liam Boyle), later introduces himself to Lucas, however Dawn and her husband Billy Fletcher (Jay Kontzle) don't think he is suitable, which he later proves.

In July 2022, it is revealed that Lucas has a half-sister Clemmie Reed (Mabel Addison), who was sleeping in a dog basket in an old friend of Dawn's flat, who had been taking care of her since her mother's death. When Dawn notices a resemblance of Lucas in Clemmie, she realises that Alex is her father, which is later confirmed to be true when her and Billy go and visit him in prison to tell him that they want to adopt Clemmie as well as Billy adopting Lucas. In 2023, Billy adopts Lucas, whereas he and Dawn become special guardians for Clemmie.

== Wendy Posner ==
Wendy Posner
- Emmerdale character
- Portrayed by: Susan Cookson
- Duration: 2019–2025
- First appearance: Episode 8521; 1 July 2019
- Last appearance: Episode 10193; 17 January 2025
- Introduced by: Jane Hudson
In-universe information
- Occupation: Nurse
- Husband: Russell Posner (backstory)
- Sons: Lee Posner; Luke Posner
- Grandsons: Harry Sugden

Wendy Posner, played by Susan Cookson, first appears on 1 July 2019. The character and Cookson's casting details were announced on 19 June 2019. Wendy is introduced as the mother of Lee Posner (Kris Mochrie), who is the rapist of Victoria Barton (Isabel Hodgins). Cookson expressed her delight at joining the cast and called Wendy "a fantastic character" with "gritty and emotional storylines". Jane Hudson, the soap's executive producer, called Cookson a "fabulous addition to the cast" and looked forward to the character's introduction. Cookson previously appeared in Emmerdale in 1993, 1997 and 2003 as minor characters.

The character is billed as "indignant" by Inside Soap. Wendy arrives to confront Victoria about the rape allegations, which she claims are false. Hodgins explained that when Wendy arrives, Victoria is "shock and scared" because Wendy is the "enemy". The actress pointed out that Wendy has Lee's interests "at heart". Wendy leaves when Charity Dingle (Emma Atkins) confronts her. When Wendy returns the following day with Lee, they discover that Victoria is pregnant with Lee's baby. Hodgins told Allison Jones of Inside Soap that this is "opening a can of worms that Victoria wanted to keep closed". Victoria later agrees to speak to Wendy, who reveals that she wants a role in the child's life and suggests that Lee could go for custody of the baby. A show spokesperson noted that this is "the worst scenario as far as Victoria is concerned".

On 29 December 2024 it was announced that Cookson had been axed from the soap with Wendy's final scenes airing on 17 January 2025, which saw her go to stay with her son Luke.

== Al Chapman ==
Al Chapman
- Emmerdale character
- Portrayed by: Michael Wildman
- Duration: 2019–2022
- First appearance: Episode 8564; 13 August 2019
- Last appearance: Episode 9513; 7 November 2022
- Introduced by: Jane Hudson
In-universe information
- Occupation: Entrepreneur
- Wife: Jessie Grant (backstory)
- Sons: Ellis Chapman

Al Chapman, played by Michael Wildman, first appears on 13 August 2019. The character and Wildman's casting details were announced on 14 July 2019. Al is introduced as the estranged father of Ellis Chapman (Asan N'Jie) and the former husband of Jessie Dingle (Sandra Marvin). Wildman began filming on a regular contract in July 2019. Wildman expressed his joy at joining the cast and was unsure about how well-received his character, who he called "interesting", would be. Wildman and N'Jie also starred on Ready Player One together and N'Jie found the connection between their characters "surreal". Wildman previously performed a screen test for a different character, but was unsuccessful.

Wildman billed the character as "ambiguous" and a "judge of character". He explained that Al is manipulative and able to "talk to five people at the same time and talk to them all in different ways". Al arrives to connect with Ellis and Wildman explained that Al "thinks he can just come back in to his life and pick up where he left off". He noted that the character would arrive "ruffling a few feathers". The actor added that Al quickly makes Jessie's husband, Marlon Dingle (Mark Charnock), feel "insecure".

In October 2022, the character was killed-off after being shot by Kyle Dingle (Huey Quinn), the son of Al's enemy Cain Dingle (Jeff Hordley). Al last appeared on screen during the episode broadcast on 7 November 2022 in a flashback scene of his death.

Marianna Manson from Closer Online put Al on her list of the 11 most iconic black characters in British soap operas, writing, "Al is a relative newcomer to Emmerdale, making his debut in the village in 2019, but anyone who can give Kim Tate a run for her money is pretty iconic in our eyes. After initially masquerading as an investor, it was later revealed that Al was the father of Jessie Grant's son Ellis. He's since been in cahoots with Kim and is the perfect soap villain."

== Luke Posner ==
Luke Posner
- Emmerdale character
- Portrayed by: Max Parker
- Duration: 2019–2021
- First appearance: Episode 8580; 29 August 2019
- Last appearance: Episode 9075; 16 June 2021
- Introduced by: Jane Hudson
In-universe information
- Occupation: Server; Chef
- Father: Russell Posner
- Mother: Wendy Posner
- Brothers: Lee Posner
- Nephews: Harry Sugden

Luke Posner, played by Max Parker, first appeared on 29 August 2019. Luke is the brother of Lee Posner (Kris Mochrie), and the son of Wendy Posner (Susan Cookson). Parker's casting details were not announced prior to his first on-screen appearance, and Luke's relatives were kept a secret from viewers. Luke meets Victoria Barton (Isabel Hodgins) in the hospital while working in the hospital canteen. Both Luke and Victoria are unaware of who the other person is, but when it transpires that Luke's brother Lee raped Victoria and she is pregnant with Lee's baby, the pair split. Luke accompanies Wendy in moving to Emmerdale village, and when he reconciles with Victoria, Wendy is upset with him. Wendy believes that Victoria is lying about being raped, but Luke insists that he knows his brother did it. Luke begins working as a chef at the Woolpack. When Luke and Victoria have sex, she expresses that she feels uncomfortable with being intimate, and the pair split.

Parker originally auditioned for the part of Jamie Tate, which was given to Alexander Lincoln. He stated: "Originally I had auditioned to play Jamie Tate, which was funny. At the time they did so many rounds – more than usual, I think – and they just couldn't find anybody. In the screen test, that was the first time I saw Alex Lincoln who plays Jamie and I was like: 'He's not been in any of the auditions!' Pretty much when they told him that he'd got that, they said: 'We would like you to play Luke. We've been writing this character, it would be really good for you'. But there was a gap before I started." He added: "I just knew my relation – I knew the whole time when Luke was in the canteen at the hospital, but there was no agenda though. A lot of people were saying that Luke knew from the start about Victoria, but it was definitely innocent flirting in the canteen." On his character, Parker commented: "I relate Luke a lot to myself. He's very assured, he's very cheeky and a showman, but there's definitely some cogs broken inside. I don't think you've seen all sides of Luke just yet."

In January 2021, it was confirmed Emmerdale would explore Luke's sexuality via his past connection with recently introduced character Ethan Anderson (Emile John). This followed the real-life coming-out of actor Max Parker, who is gay and in a relationship with Kris Mochrie, who played his on-screen brother, Lee. In the narrative, Luke is introduced by partner Victoria to Ethan, hiding that they have met; scenes later in the same episode see Ethan comment on Luke's “sham” relationship with Victoria as well as his past affairs with both Ethan himself and another mutual acquaintance, which Luke dismisses as “history” and affirms that he is now straight.

== Danny Harrington ==
Danny Harrington
- Emmerdale character
- Portrayed by: Louis Healy
- Duration: 2019–2021
- First appearance: Episode 8594; 16 September 2019
- Last appearance: Episode 8943; 14 January 2021
- Introduced by: Jane Hudson
In-universe information
- Occupation: Student

Danny Harrington, played by Louis Healy, first appears on 16 September 2019. The character and Healy's casting details were announced on 3 September 2019. Danny is introduced as a love interest for teenage character Sarah Sugden (Katie Hill). Healy was contracted for a guest stint, which Tilly Pearce of the Metro confirmed would last a "few months". The character, who is billed as a "new boy-next-door", will feature in a "sinister" storyline with Sarah. As a result of spending time with Danny, Sarah soon neglects her studies, creating tension with her grandmother, Charity Dingle (Emma Atkins). Radio Times' Johnathon Hughes described Danny as the "school heart-throb". Pearce warned that Sarah should be cautious around Danny.

Danny and Sarah initially talk to each other online, and when they begin meeting in person, Sarah skips school to spend more time with him. Charity and her partner Vanessa Woodfield (Michelle Hardwick) warn Danny to stay away from Sarah, but after Sarah explains that she meets with him due to fearing she will die young from her Fanconi anaemia, and that she wants to enjoy herself. Charity allows her to continue seeing Danny, and when she invites him to a party, he gives her drugs. He later convinces Sarah to sell drugs for him, claiming he will get beaten up if he does not deliver his selling targets, showing her injuries on his body. Danny's friend later informs Sarah that the injury was from falling from his bike, and realising she has been used, Sarah plants drugs in his pocket and reports him to the police. He is later sent to prison. Upon his release, he continues to sell drugs, and when Sarah is warned about the seriousness of his dangerous lifestyle, she cuts contact with him.

== Derek Malone ==
Derek Malone
- Emmerdale character
- Portrayed by: Tommy Cannon
- First appearance: Episode 8597; 19 September 2019
- Last appearance: Episode 8606; 30 September 2019
- Introduced by: Jane Hudson

Derek Malone, played by Tommy Cannon, first appears on 19 September 2019. Cannon announced on Twitter in August 2019 that he would be appearing in Emmerdale, but deleted his tweet shortly after. In the tweet, he expressed his delight at his casting. A show spokesperson declined to comment on Cannon's casting. Further details about Cannon's casting and the character were announced on 3 September 2019. Derek is introduced as a patient of established character Manpreet Sharma (Rebecca Sarker). Cannon was contracted for a guest stint, which was billed to create "serious consequences" for other regular characters. Cannon's casting was well received by the press and media and Emmerdale cast members congratulated him.

It was later confirmed that Derek would be killed off at the conclusion of his stint, sparking a new story for the Sharma family. He dies from Salmonella poisoning after eating Rishi Sharma's (Bhasker Patel) homemade chocolates, which also makes David Metcalfe (Matthew Wolfenden) ill. When Manpreet sorts Derek's belongings, she discovers a valuable stamp collection which could help the family's financial crisis. The character departed in episode 8606, originally broadcast on 30 September 2019. Kyle O'Sullivan of the Daily Mirror dubbed Derek's death as "gruesome".

== Eve Dingle ==
Eve Dingle
- Emmerdale character
- Portrayed by: Billy Clement (2019–2020); Bonnie Clement (2019–2022); Bella James (2022–present)
- Duration: 2019–present
- First appearance: Episode 8627; 23 October 2019
- Introduced by: Jane Hudson
In-universe information
- Father: Paddy Kirk
- Mother: Chas Dingle
- Stepmother: Mandy Dingle
- Sisters: Grace Dingle
- Half-brothers: Aaron Dingle
- Grandfathers: Bear Wolf; Shadrach Dingle
- Grandmothers: Barbara Kirk; Faith Dingle
- Uncles: Cain Dingle; Caleb Miligan
- First cousins: Debbie Dingle; Nate Robinson; Nicky Miligan; Kyle Dingle; Isaac Dingle
- Other relatives: Zak Dingle; Charity Dingle; Noah Dingle; Mandy Dingle; Marlon Dingle; Samson Dingle; Leyla Sugden

Eve Dingle, portrayed by Bella James is the daughter of Paddy Kirk (Dominic Brunt) and Chas Dingle (Lucy Pargeter). She was born in the men's toilets at The Woolpack public house, after Chas gets locked in along with Marlon Dingle (Mark Charnock). Eve's gender comes as a surprise, as her dyslexic paternal grandfather Bear Wolf (Joshua Richards) thought he had read that she would be a boy.

In March 2020, Paddy took Eve along on a car ride to cheer up Marlon Dingle (Mark Charnock), who was having a rough time. He later suffered a heart attack, leading to Paddy leaving Eve alone in the car when taking him to hospital. When Paddy returned, he found the back seat of the car empty, however a police officer told him his daughter was safe, but social services would have to be called. Eve spent a night in hospital as a precaution, but was discharged the next day. On 23 March, Eve had a joint christening ceremony with Theo Metcalfe (Talitha Taylor and Eve Rowlinski) and Harry Sugden (Brody and Teddy Hall), but the occasion was not the happiest as Chas couldn't believe that Paddy left Eve alone in the car, but subsequently managed to work things out when the social worker told her that they had nothing to worry about.

== Theo Metcalfe ==
Theo Metcalfe
- Emmerdale character
- Portrayed by: Talitha Taylor and Eve Rowlinski (2019–2020); Beau-Ronnie Newton (2021–2023)
- Duration: 2019–2023
- First appearance: Episode 8685/6; 25 December 2019
- Last appearance: Episode 9722/3; 6 July 2023
- Introduced by: Jane Hudson
In-universe information
- Father: David Metcalfe
- Mother: Maya Stepney
- Half-brothers: Jacob Gallagher (adoptive)
- Half-sisters: Amba Metcalfe
- Grandfathers: Eric Pollard
- Grandmothers: Lydia Halliwell
- Nieces: Leyla Sugden (adoptive)

Theodore Eric "Theo" Metcalfe (legally named Alex Stepney), originally portrayed by Talitha Taylor and Eve Rowlinski, then later on by Beau-Ronnie Newton, is the son of David Metcalfe (Matthew Wolfenden) and Maya Stepney (Louisa Clein) who is abandoned by Maya and left on David's doorstep. It is initially unknown whether David or his adoptive son Jacob Gallagher (Joe-Warren Plant), who Maya groomed and sexually abused, is the father until a paternity test confirms the results. David was didn't report the matter to social services due to the fact they could potentially take Theo off him, so his friend Doctor Liam Cavanagh (Johnny McPherson) took the DNA test, but insisted that he reported it. After contacting the social worker, Maya was also contacted, and as the name was Alex Stepney on the birth certificate and his name was absent, he needed to apply for parental responsibility to secure his rights to Theo.

On 23 March 2020, Theo was christened as part of a joint ceremony with Eve Dingle (Billy and Bonnie Clement) and Harry Sugden (Brody and Teddy Hall). On the same day, David received a letter informing him that he had parental rights. In 2021, David begins to take it in turns with Victoria Sugden (Isabel Hodgins) to mind Theo and Harry, which leads to them growing closer. As Meena Jutla (Paige Sandhu) is David's girlfriend at the time, she begins to feel jealous and insecure, so she steals Theo from Victoria's house when she isn't looking and when a search party is sent out, she returns him making her look like the hero of the hour.

Theo left Emmerdale with his father after he discovered that Victoria and Jacob have been having a secret relationship and therefore decided to move away to live nearer his daughter Amba Metcalfe (Ava Jayasinghe) and her mother Priya Sharma (Fiona Wade). Theo was last seen on 6 July 2023, however David's last appearance was 30 November the same year.

== Other characters ==
Character	Date(s)	Actor	Circumstances
Hilary Benshaw	2 April-2 May	Gabrielle Glaister	A rival for Nicola King (Nicola Wheeler), who is also standing in for the local election, in order to impress Kim Tate (Claire King) and stay on her good side. Hilary proves to be popular with the locals of Emmerdale, meaning Nicola has a fight on her hands.
John Richmond	4 April	David Roper	A man who attends a dance at St. Mary's Church in Emmerdale, where he meets Laurel Thomas (Charlotte Bellamy), and asks her to dance with him.
Max Garrick	12 April-25 June	Jordan Reece	An old criminal acquaintance of Billy Fletcher (Jay Kontzle) that turns up in Emmerdale when he needs someone to work for him as a getaway driver during the robbery, which he initially refuses but later changes his mind when he needs money. Billy's brother Ellis Chapman (Asan N'Jie) later discovers this plan and puts a stop to it. When Max finds out that Billy pulled out of the plan he begins to threaten his family and even stabbed Ellis on a night out. He then broke into Billy's home, holding his family, including his mother Jessie Dingle (Sandra Marvin), stepfather Marlon Dingle (Mark Charnock) and 10-year-old step-sister April Windsor (Amelia Flanagan) hostage at gunpoint. He ends up shooting Jessie, but she is rushed to hospital and makes a recovery.
Natalie	16 April–8 August	Thea Beyleveld	A potential surrogate for Aaron Dingle (Danny Miller) and Robert Sugden (Ryan Hawley).
Lee Posner	25 April-15 October	Kris Mochrie	A man who meets Victoria Barton (Isobel Hodgins) at a nightclub. He later accompanies her back to her house, where she invites him in for a drink. Victoria asks Lee to leave, as she is tired, but he follows her upstairs and rapes her. Victoria reports the rape a week later after confiding in her mother-in-law Moira Dingle (Natalie J. Robb), but Lee cannot be charged due to lack of evidence. Victoria soon learns she is pregnant. Her brother, Robert Sugden (Ryan Hawley) tries to get his revenge on Lee. After initially bribing Lee to go away, he brags about raping Victoria to Robert, who beats him into a coma with a shovel, leading him to be arrested for GBH. Although he eventually wakes up, Lee dies sometime after, which leads to Robert being sent down for 14 years.
Jono Laverne	25 July–16 August	Eddie-Joe Robinson	A friend of Matty Barton (Ash Palmisciano). He insults Ryan Stocks (James Moore) on several occasions, annoying Matty's friends, believing he is just using him so he can buy drinks for him.
Karen	30 July–1 August	Reanne Farley	A woman who comes to Emmerdale to confront Amy Wyatt (Natalie Ann Jamieson) over her stolen money. Amy and her mother, Kerry (Laura Norton), are then driven to breaking into Sharma and Sharma to steal £4,000 in charity funds from the safe, paying Karen off, but also starting a fire that kills Frank Clayton (Michael Praed).
Terry	25–30 October	Rene Zagger	A casino owner who Mandy Dingle (Lisa Riley) and Vinny (Bradley Johnson) stole £20,000 from.
Beth Finn	7 November-17 April 2020	Jeanette Percival	The sister of Lydia Hart (Karen Blick), who she meets for the first time when she comes to see their mother, Agatha Finn (Judith Barker). Beth tells her that Agatha is dead, and she has no interest in getting to know Lydia. Inside the house, Beth tells Agatha that the person at the door was just selling raffle tickets. However, after Lydia finally sees her mother she later becomes more involved in Lydia's life, and stays in contact.
Agatha Finn	7 November-17 July 2020	Judith Barker	The estranged mother of Lydia Hart (Karen Blick), who left her some money. When Lydia comes to see Agatha, she meets her sister Beth Finn (Jeanette Percival) instead, who tells her that their mother is dead. After Lydia leaves, Agatha appears and asks Beth who was at the door, but is told that it was just a raffle ticket seller. Agatha and Beth later become more involved in Lydia's life, and stay in contact. Lydia visited Agatha in 2023, when she was having marital problems with her husband Sam Dingle (James Hooton) after she was raped by her childhood friend and boss Craig Reed (Ben Addis), whom she had recently regained contact with.
Sean	11–20 January 2020	Mark Holgate	A criminal who has his cars stolen by Cain Dingle (Jeff Hordley) and Aaron Dingle (Danny Miller) He kidnaps Moses Dingle (Arthur Cockroft) in revenge.
Barbara	26 December	Sandra Duncan	The mother of Maya Stepney (Louisa Clein) who tells Leyla Harding (Roxy Shahidi) and Liam Cavanagh (Jonny McPherson) that she has left the country.
