= Mouth to mouth =

Mouth to mouth may refer to:

- Mouth-to-mouth resuscitation, a part of cardiopulmonary resuscitation

== Film ==
- Mouth to Mouth (1978 film), an Australian film by John Duigan
- Mouth to Mouth (1995 film), a Spanish film by Manuel Gómez Pereira
- Mouth to Mouth (2005 British film), a drama by Alison Murray
- Mouth to Mouth (2005 Swedish film), a drama by Björn Runge

== Music ==
- Mouth to Mouth (The Blackeyed Susans album), 1995
- Mouth to Mouth (Levellers album), 1997
- Mouth to Mouth (Lipps Inc. album), 1979
- Mouth to Mouth (Mental As Anything album), a 1987 album by Mental As Anything
- Mouth to Mouth, a 1992 EP by Genkaku Allergy
- "Mouth to Mouth", a song by Faith No More from Album of the Year
- "Mouth to Mouth", a song by The Vaselines from Sex with an X

== Television ==
- Mouth to Mouth (TV series), a 2009 British comedy-drama series
