= Laura Pitt-Pulford =

British actress

Laura Pitt-Pulford is a British actress, best known for her work in musical theatre and for playing Carol Butler in Emmerdale.

== Early life ==
Pitt-Pulford grew up in Rugby, joined a local youth operatic group at age 12, and trained in drama at the Mountview Academy of Theatre Arts. She is currently playing the bakers wife in the hit musical ‘Into The Woods’ in the London west end.

== Career ==
In 2015, she played Milly in Regent's Park Open Air Theatre production of Seven Brides for Seven Brothers. She received great acclaim for her performance, with a review from Claire Allfree in The Daily Telegraph commenting "In a marvellous performance, Laura Pitt-Pulford's sparky, indomitable Milly holds all the power here". Mark Shenton of The Stage stated that "Pitt-Pulford, too, is a radiant, ravishing Milly, combining brassy toughness with vulnerability". She was nominated for the Laurence Olivier Award for Best Actress in a Musical for her performance.

In 2016, she appeared in the musical Flowers for Mrs. Harris at the Crucible Theatre, Sheffield She also starred as Violet in the UK premiere of Side Show at the Southwark Playhouse.

In 2017, she played the title role in a UK touring production of Nell Gwynn. Pitt-Pulford most recently appeared in the role of Chairy Barnum in the 2017 revival of the Cy Coleman musical Barnum at the Menier Chocolate Factory alongside comedian Marcus Brigstocke.

In 2019, she played the role of Sheryl Hoover in the Off West End European premiere of Little Miss Sunshine at the Arcola Theatre.

In 2020, she sang the song "One Small Step" from the anime Dr. Stone.

Pitt-Pulford appeared in The Sound of Music in 2014 as Maria Von Trapp with Michael French at the Curve Theatre in Leicester and earned a UK Theatre Award nomination for her performance of Maria. Pitt-Pulford starred in Craig Revel Horwood’s production of Sunset Boulevard in 2008 in the role of Betty alongside Ben Goddard and Kathryn Evans who played Norma Desmond at the Watermill Theatre and the Comedy Theatre. Pitt-Pulford also played Irene Molloy in 2012’s Leicester Curve production of Hello Dolly! with Michael Xavier and Janie Dee.

She starred as Trina in Falsettos at The Other Palace from August 2019. Pitt-Pulford has also had guest roles in TV dramas Father Brown (where she played Scarlett Dreyfuss) and Doctors (Tina Hempsey), and as the Deputy Head in second series of the BBC legal drama The Split in 2020. In December 2021 and April 2022, she appeared in Emmerdale as Carol Butler.

Laura played Rose Vibert in the revival of Aspects of Love at the Lyric Theatre alongside Michael Ball from Saturday 13 May 2023 – Saturday 19 August 2023.

Laura played Poppy in the musical Standing at the Sky's Edge at the Gillian Lynne Theatre from February 8, 2024 to August 3, 2024.
