= Carryl Thomas =

British actress

- Born: 17 May 1978 (age 47); London, England
- Education: Mountview Academy of Theatre Arts
- Occupation: Actress
- Years active: 2001–present
- Spouse: Wil Coleman (m. 2014)
- Children: 4

Carryl Thomas (born 17 May 1978) is an English actress, known for her roles as Kelly Boulter on the Channel 5 soap opera, Family Affairs (2003–2005) and Cara Robinson on the ITV soap opera Emmerdale (2020, 2025).

== Filmography ==
Year	Title	Role	Notes
2003–2005	Family Affairs	Kelly Boulter	Regular role
2006	Holby City	Amber Simon	Episode: "Extreme Measures"
2008	The Sarah Jane Adventures	Cheryl Farley	2 episodes; Secrets of the Stars
2011	Demons Never Die	Girl at Party	
2013	Jo	Nina Okoro	Miniseries
2013	Holby City	Ruth Egleberry	Episode: "The Cost of Loving"
2017	Fight the Good Fight	Bernadette	
2018	On The Edge	Claudia	Episode: "A Mother's Love"
2019	The Athena	Arabelle	2 Episodes: "The List"
2020, 2025	Emmerdale	Cara Robinson	Recurring role

== Stage ==
Year	Title	Role	Writer	Director	Venue
2001	My Fair Lady	Flower Girl	George Bernard Shaw	Trevor Nunn	National Theatre, London
2001	My Fair Lady	Flower Girl	George Bernard Shaw	Trevor Nunn	Theatre Royal Drury Lane, London
2002	Our House	Heather	Tim Firth	Matthew Warchus	Cambridge Theatre, London
2008	Flashdance	Keisha	Thomas Hedley, Robert Cary	Kenny Leon	UK Tour
