= Karene Peter =

English actress (born 1991)

- Born: Karene Estelle Peter; 18 January 1991 (age 35); Waltham Forest, London, England
- Education: Identity School of Acting
- Occupation: Actress
- Years active: 2013–present

Karene Estelle Peter (born 18 January 1991) is an English actress. Whilst working in retail, a friend convinced her to join her acting class and she eventually began making appearances in British television series including Holby City and Doctors. She then portrayed the role of Serena in the CBBC series The Sparticle Mystery. After a recurring role in the BBC period drama Call the Midwife, she was cast as Naomi Walters in the ITV1 soap opera Emmerdale, a role she stayed in from 2022 to 2023.

== Life and career ==
Karene Estelle Peter was born on 18 January 1991 in the London Borough of Waltham Forest. Whilst on a gap year from university, she worked in Sports Direct. Whilst there, a friend told her to join her acting class, and after she trained at the Identity School of Acting, she started booking television, advertisement and stage roles. Peter's television debut was in an episode of the BBC medical drama Holby City in 2013, shortly followed by a role in fellow BBC medical soap opera Doctors that same year. Also in 2013, Peter was cast in the role of Serena on the CBBC science fiction series The Sparticle Mystery. She starred in the second and third series.

In 2016, Peter made her film debut in the comedy film Mindhorn. A year later, she appeared in an episode of the ITV1 crime drama series Unforgotten. 2021 saw Peter appear in the recurring role of student midwife Georgette Baines in the BBC period drama series Call the Midwife. A year later, she was cast in the ITV1 soap opera Emmerdale as Naomi Walters. Peter said it was surreal to be joining Emmerdale, having watched the soap as a child. Her character was introduced as the daughter of established characters Charles (Kevin Mathurin) and Esme (Eva Fontaine) and the younger sister of Ethan Anderson (Emile John). Naomi was initially referenced on the soap in October 2021 when Esme mentions her to Charles. She made her first appearance on 14 June 2022. In April 2023, it was announced that Peter had quit her role as Naomi. A spokesperson said that Peter had enjoyed her time on Emmerdale, but due to wanting to play different roles, she had made the decision to leave. Peter's character made her final appearance on 6 July 2023, with the soap writing her out in a way that could accommodate Peter's return in the future, if she wanted.

Following her Emmerdale exit, Peter appeared in the 2023 film Rye Lane. In 2026, she joined the stage production of Jaja's African Hair Braiding at the Lyric Theatre in Hammersmith. The play is set in a Harlem hair braiding salon and follows a group of West African immigrant braiders and their customers.

== Filmography ==
Year	Title	Role	Notes
2013	Holby City	Lyndsey Campbell	Episode: "Promises, Promises"
2013	Doctors	Amy Chander	Episode: "Where the Buck Stops"
2013–2015	The Sparticle Mystery	Serena	Main role
2016	Mindhorn	Jane the Runner	Film
2017	Unforgotten	WPC Grant	Guest role
2021	Call the Midwife	Georgette Baines	Recurring role
2022–2023	Emmerdale	Naomi Walters	Regular role
2023	Rye Lane	Gia	Film

== Stage ==
Year	Title	Role	Venue	Ref.
Unknown	The Petticoat Rebellion	Ensemble	Shaftesbury Theatre	
Unknown	Licence to Thrill	Ensemble	Theatre Royal Drury Lane	
2026	Jaja's African Hair Braiding	Jennifer	Lyric Theatre	
