= Kevin Mathurin =

British actor (born 1973)

- Born: 1973 (age 52–53); London, England
- Occupation: Actor
- Years active: 1977–present
- Children: 2

Kevin Mathurin (born 1973) is an English actor. After an initially dance-focused career, he trained in acting as an adult and appeared in numerous stage productions throughout the 2000s and 2010s. In 2020, he was cast as Charles Anderson on the ITV1 soap opera Emmerdale, a role he has portrayed since.

== Early and personal life ==
Mathurin was born in 1973 in London. Aged seven, he began attending the Sylvia Young Theatre School. When founder Sylvia Young died in 2025, he paid his tributes, writing: "Thank you for the opportunities and belief". Since 2011, Mathurin has been in a relationship with DJ Nikki Beatnik. They have a son together. Mathurin also has a daughter. They live in south London, with Mathurin regularly travelling to Leeds for filming on Emmerdale.

== Career ==
Mathurin left college in 1991 and initially embarked on a dance-focused career; this included being a backing dancer for Diana Ross at Madison Square Garden. After acting in various projects as a child, Mathurin embarked on a stage career in the mid-2000s. He studied at City Lit, an adult education college in Holburn, where he appeared in numerous stage productions. After graduating from there, he continued making theatre appearances throughout the 2010s, as well as making various television and film appearances. In 2019, he appeared in an episode of the BBC soap opera Doctors as James Bailey. That same year, he made his National Theatre Live debut in Nine Night. He returned a year later for The Visit.

In 2020, Mathurin was cast as vicar Charles Anderson on the ITV1 soap opera Emmerdale. An onscreen family was introduced for his character, including children Ethan Anderson (Emile John) and Naomi Walters (Karene Peter) and mother Claudette Anderson (Flo Wilson). Wilson, who portrays his onscreen mother, had previously worked alongside Mathurin in The Visit. Upon his casting, he joked that his mother finally believed he had "made it", since she had watched Emmerdale since its first episode. For his role as Charles, Mathurin was nominated for Best Newcomer at the 2021 Inside Soap Awards. At the 2023 ceremony, he was nominated for Best Actor, as well as Best Partnership alongside Rebecca Sarker. The Andersons were also nominated for Best Family.

== Filmography ==
Year	Title	Role	Notes
1977	The ITV Play	Mr Clifton	Episode: "Are You Stone Cold, Santa Claus?"
1985	Der Rosenkavalier	Mohammed	Television film
1990	Press Gang	Member of the News Team	Episode: "Picking Up the Pieces"
2011	Ghosted	Prison Inmate	Film
2014	Narcissists	Private Inspector	Film
2015	Simulated Dead People	Dean	Guest role
2016	Rillington Place	Beresford Brown	Episode: "Reg"
2017	Michael Jackson: Man in the Mirror	Berry Gordy	Television film
2017	Warhammer 40,000: Dawn of War III	Orks (voice)	Video game
2017	Gloves	Al	Short film
2017	Justice League	Sketch Witness	Film
2017	War Has No Eyes	Gary	Short film
2018	Banged Up Abroad	Manny	Episode: "Narco at Nineteen"
2018	Hooligan Escape the Russian Job	Tom	Film
2019	Doctors	James Bailey	Episode: "Believe Her"
2019	Bronzed	Hector	Main role
2020	Faded Glory	Lenny	Short film
2020	Break	Drug Dealer	Short film
2020	The One and Only Ivan	Mike	Film
2020	Home by 8.30	Dad	Short film
2020–present	Emmerdale	Charles Anderson	Regular role
2021	The Thirteenth Doctor Adventures	King Henry II / Prince Richard (voices)	Episode: "Lionesses in Winter"
2023	The Big Quiz	Himself	Contestant

== Stage ==
Year	Title	Role	Venue
2006	This Happy Breed	Frank Gibbons	City Lit Theatre
2006	Agamemnon	Aegisthus	City Lit Theatre
2006	Oedipus the King	Oedipus	City Lit Theatre
2007	Metamorphoses	Various	City Lit Theatre
2007	Antigone	Creon	City Lit Theatre
2007	The Winter's Tale	Leontes	City Lit Theatre
2008	Blood Wedding	Leonardo	City Lit Theatre
2008	The Country Wife	Harry Harcourt	City Lit Theatre
2008	Blue Orange	Christopher	City Lit Theatre
2008	D.N.A.	Richard	City Lit Theatre
2009	One Flew Over the Cuckoo's Nest	R.P. McMurphy	City Lit Theatre
2009	Stags and Hens	Eddie	Landor Theatre
2010	Kids Company	Various	Royal National Theatre
2010	A Consumers Dream	Terry	LOST Theatre
2011	Free Fall	Roland	White Bear Theatre
2012	Monostereo	Danny Marshall	Drayton Arms Theatre
2013	Out in the Open	Mick	Chelsea Theatre
2014	Monogamish	Charles	White Bear Theatre
2014	Nightingale & Chase	Nightingale	Albany Theatre
2014	74 Ruby Street	DCI Woods	Excel Centre
2018	Of Mice and Men	Crooks	Selladoor Worldwide
2019	Nine Night	Robert / Uncle Vince	National Theatre Live
2019	The Exonerated	David Keaon	Hope Mill Theatre
2020	The Visit	Bill	National Theatre Live

== Awards and nominations ==
Year	Award	Category	Nominated work	Result	Ref.
2021	Inside Soap Awards	Best Newcomer	Emmerdale	Nominated	
2023	Inside Soap Awards	Best Actor	Emmerdale	Nominated	
2023	Inside Soap Awards	Best Partnership (with Rebecca Sarker)	Emmerdale	Nominated	
