= Mouth to Mouth (TV series) =

2009 British comedy-drama television series

- Genre: Comedy drama
- Written by: Karl Minns
- Directed by: Craig Young
- Country of origin: United Kingdom
- Original language: English
- No. of series: 1
- No. of episodes: 6

Production
- Producer: Mark Iddon
- Running time: 30 minutes

Original release
- Network: BBC Three
- Release: 23 November – 7 December 2009

Mouth to Mouth is a 2009 comedy-drama television series written by Karl Minns and broadcast on BBC Three. A successful pilot episode of the programme aired in 2008, featuring the same female cast as the full series but without any male characters and with a significantly different story. Each of the six episodes follows a monologue structure (with brief comments from other characters) in which each of the main characters describes their life around the same date. As the series progresses, the viewer discovers how the lives are interwoven. On the surface, the script contains some fine humorous moments, but it also addresses serious issues.

== Cast ==
- Anna Nightingale as Meeshell Reeves
- Alex Price as Tyler Cooke
- Simon Coombs as Luke Sobers
- Ayesha Antoineas Devine Bello
- Shane Zaza as Rakim Prateek
- Pippa Duffy as Faith

== Episodes ==
No.	Title	Original release date
1	"Meeshell"	23 November 2009
2	"Tyler"	23 November 2009
3	"Luke"	30 November 2009
4	"Devine"	30 November 2009
5	"Rakim"	7 December 2009
6	"Faith"	7 December 2009

== Reception ==
Tim Dowling of The Guardian said of the first episode that the "monologue format is a bit stilted but the writing is sharp and at times very funny". Joe Clay in The Times called it "brave thought provoking telly that is also very funny". Matt Bayliss in The Daily Express thought the series "a modern fairy tale that managed to be both original and still actually work". The Radio Times was also a fan, calling it "beautifully written and splendidly acted...a treat of the kind seldom found on BBC3".
