= Michael Wildman =

English actor

- Born: Enfield, London, England
- Occupation: Actor
- Years active: 1997–present
- Television: Harry Potter and the Order of the Phoenix (2007); Emmerdale (2019–2022); Baby Reindeer (2024)

Michael Wildman is an English actor.

== Early life ==
Wildman was born and raised in Enfield.

== Career ==
Wildman appeared in the film Harry Potter and the Order of the Phoenix, where he played the role of a centaur Magorian. Prior to accepting this role, Wildman was in the West End playing other programmes, most notably in Episode 5 of the British sitcom Extras alongside Samuel L. Jackson and in the part of the first Marc MacKenzie in Family Affairs. He portrayed the role of Al Chapman on the ITV soap opera Emmerdale between August 2019 and October 2022.

== Personal life ==
Wildman married Welsh singer and actress Ceri Ann Gregory in 2018. They have one son and live in Henley-on-Thames, Oxfordshire.

== Screen credits ==
- Bring Me the Head of Mavis Davis (1997) as Hilary
- Smack the Pony Episodes No.1.7 (1999) and No.1.3 (1999)TV episode
- Happiness (2001) TV Series as Toby X
- Is Harry on the Boat? Episode No.1.6 (2002) TV Episode as Josh
  - "Team Work" (1999) TV Episode as Karl Lawrence
  - "A Hard Day's Night" (2003) TV Episode as Rollo
  - "Dark Places" (2010) TV Episode as Troy
- Casualty
- Peep Show Episode No.1.5 (2003) TV Episode as Band Member
- Family Affairs (2003–2004) as Marc MacKenzie No.1
- Down to Earth "Ignorance Is Bliss" (2005) TV Episode as Alex Faraday
- Extras Episode No.1.5 (2005) TV Episode as Danny
- Waking the Dead Black Run (2005) TV Episode as Tom
- The Bourne Ultimatum (2007) as CRI Agent
- W delta Z (2007) as O'Hare
- Frankenstein (2007) as DCI Connely
- Harry Potter and the Order of the Phoenix (2007) as Magorian Centaur
- HolbyBlue (2008) as Adam Starkey
- Miranda (2009) as The Gym Instructor (Series 1 Episode 3 "Job")
- Primeval (2009) as Captain Ross
- Plus One (2009) as Vic
- New Tricks (2010) as Milton Joseph
- Walter's War (2011) as Edward Tull
- Me and Mrs Jones (2012) as Nero
- Acts Of Godfrey (2012) as Jamie
- Being Human (2012) as Milo
- The Sweeney (2012) as Evelyn Simmonds
- Eve (2016) as Lord Hoffman
- Silent Witness (2016) as DI Joe Curtis
- Midsomer Murders as Killion Staples episode 18.4 "A Dying Art"
- London Has Fallen (2016) as Agent Voight
- Death in Paradise (2017) as Archer Browne
- Back (2017–2021) as Tom
- American Assassin (2017) as Orion instructor
- Ready Player One (2018) as Sixer Drill Instructor
- Emmerdale (2019–2022) as Al Chapman
- Liar (2020) as DI Michael McCoy
- Baby Reindeer (2024) as Greggsy
- Maigret (2025) as Gustave Fernand
- Ludwig series 2 (2026) as DCC Clint Radley
- Inga Campbell show (1999)
