= Liam Boyle (actor) =

British actor

Liam Boyle (born 19 September 1985) is a British actor.

== Early life ==
Boyle was born in Bolton, Greater Manchester on 19 September 1985, and grew up in Heywood, Greater Manchester, England.

== Career ==
It was in his final preparations for a teaching degree at University that Boyle was spotted by a casting director at an open audition for a film. Instead of going to the final interviews for his degree he made the decision to go to the recalls for the film, which fell on the same day. He was trained in drama at the Oldham Theatre Workshop. Whilst at college Boyle was auditioned by the casting agent David Shaw for a film called Love + Hate, getting a small role in the film as Steve.

He has since appeared in various TV and film roles, including the awarding series The Street, Instinct and Land Girls. His most well known performance was as Elvis in the movie Awaydays. In December 2021, he joined the cast of Emmerdale as Alex Moore.

== Filmography ==
Year	Film	Role	Notes
2005	Love + Hate	Steve	
2005	Magnificent 7	Liam	TV movie
2005	Shameless	Mick	TV series (2 episodes: 2005–2006)
2006	Northern Lights	Nicky	TV series (1 episode: "Episode #1.2")
2006	The Street	Mick	TV series (1 episode: "Football")
2006	The Bill	Scott	TV series (1 episode: "Episode #448")
2006	Goldplated	Russell	TV series (2 episodes)
2006	The Innocence Project	Craig	TV series (1 episode: "Episode #1.2)
2006	Drop Dead Gorgeous	Darren Fairhurst	TV series (10 episodes: 2006–2007)
2007	Casualty	Alan Jessup	TV series (Season 21, Episode 25: "The Miracle on Harry's Last Shift")
2007	Instinct	Jake Richards	TV movie
2007	Doctors	Ritchie Tyler	TV series (1 episode: "The Story of My Life")
2008	Spooks: Code 9	Charlie Green	TV series (6 episodes)
2009	Awaydays	Mark "Elvis" Elways	
2009	Robin Hood	Edmund	TV series (Season 3, Episode 4: "Sins of the Father")
2009	Land Girls	Billy Finch	TV series (10 episodes: 2009–2011)
2010	Powder	Keva McCluskey	
2012	Scott & Bailey	Dominic Bailey	TV series (8 episodes: 2012)
2012	Truth or Dare	Paul	
2013	Skins	Louie	TV series (Season 7, Episodes 5-6: "Rise")
2013	The Look of Love	Derry	
2019	Coronation Street	Abe Crowley	
2021–2023	Emmerdale	Alex Moore	Recurring role
