= Anna Nightingale =

British actress (born 1990/1991)

- Born: 1990 or 1991 (age 34–35); London, England
- Education: BRIT School
- Occupation: Actress
- Years active: 2007–present
- Children: 2

Anna Nightingale (born 1990/1991) is an English actress. She is known for her roles in the television series Mouth to Mouth (2009), Doctors (2013) and in the British soap opera Emmerdale (2019–2021).

== Life and career ==
Nightingale trained at the BRIT School in London, alongside classmates Adele, Amy Winehouse and Jessie J. She made her film debut in the 2007 short film Alice in the City, with her television debut airing in 2009 in an episode of Ashes to Ashes. She then appeared in various television series including Casualty, Doctors and My Mad Fat Diary. In 2019, it was announced that she had been cast in the ITV soap opera Emmerdale as series regular Andrea Tate. She left the series on 21 October 2021 after she was killed off.

In 2020, Nightingale joined the supergroup known as the Celebs to raise money for both Alzheimer's Society and Action for Children. They recorded a new rendition of "Merry Christmas Everyone" by Shakin' Stevens and it was released digitally on 11 December 2020, on independent record label Saga Entertainment. The music video debuted on Good Morning Britain the day before release. The song peaked at number two on the iTunes pop chart. In 2022, Nightingale finished in second place on BBC's Celebrity Mastermind.

== Filmography ==
=== Film ===
Year	Title	Role	Notes
2007	Alice in the City	Alice	Short film
2007	Snowdon and Margaret: Inside a Royal Marriage	Princess Margaret	
2011	Victim	Davina	
2011	Demons Never Die	Girl at Party	
2012	The Warning	Reporter	
2013	The Best Years	Nadine McKnight	
2013	The Callback Queen	April	
2014	Abducted	Alison Hollis	
2014	Limbo	Abby	Short Film
2016	House of Salem	Mrs. Downing	
2019	Sunset Contract	Mary	
2020	Limbo	Abby	

=== Television ===
Year	Title	Role	Notes
2009	Ashes to Ashes	Sally	Episode: "2.1"
2009	Casualty	Lisa	1 episode
2009	Mouth to Mouth	Meeshell Reeves	Main role
2011	Misfits	Jenna	Episode: "3.6"
2013	Doctors	Sigourney Newton	Recurring role
2014	My Mad Fat Diary	Olivia	Recurring role
2014	Silk	Louise Philpott	Episodes: "3.5" and "3.6"
2018	Age of Living Dead	Sheena	2 episodes
2019–2021	Emmerdale	Andrea Tate	Series regular
