= Susan Cookson =

English actress

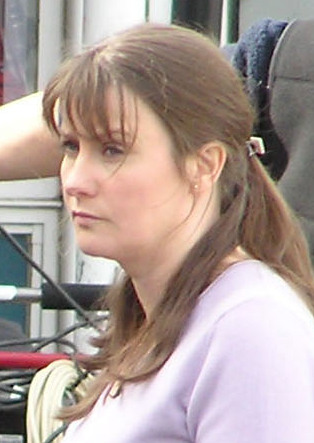
- Cookson on the set of Casualty
- Born: 20 April 1965 (age 61); Manchester, England
- Occupations: Television and radio actress
- Spouse: Malcolm Scates (m. 1993; died 2016)
- Children: 2

Susan Cookson (born 20 April 1965) is an English actress. She has appeared in various television dramas and is best known as Maggie Coldwell in Casualty (2005–2009, 2015) and Wendy Posner in Emmerdale (2019–2025).

== Career ==
Cookson portrayed the role of Maggie Coldwell on the BBC medical drama Casualty from 2005 to 2009 (this was Cookson's second role on the programme after appearing as recurring character Julie Day. She returned in March 2015 for one episode. She also appeared in the BBC soap opera Doctors as Kath Wylie for three episodes in 2009. From 2019 to 2025, Cookson portrayed the regular role of Wendy Posner in the ITV soap opera Emmerdale.

== Selected roles ==
- Casualty - Julie Day (1998–2000); Maggie Coldwell (2005–2009, 2015)
- Early Doors - Tanya (2003–2004)
- Bodies - Yvonne Matthews (2004)
- Emmerdale - Attendant (1993); D.C. Fallon (1997); DI Judy Dove (2002–2003); Wendy Posner (2019–2025)
- Shipman - DC Marie Snitynski (2002)
- Fat Friends - Lynette Pickering (2000)
- Clocking Off - Janice Piper
- Queer as Folk - Marcie Finch
- Land Girls - Esther Reeves (2009-2011)
- Moving On - Barbara (2009)
- Waterloo Road - Maria Lucas (2010)
- Mount Pleasant - Jenny (2012)
- Last Tango in Halifax - Yvonne (2013)
- Miracle Babies (TV documentary) - narrator (2014)
- Coronation Street - Marion Logan (2015–2016)

== Awards ==
Cookson won "Fave Female" of Series 21 of Casualty in the 2007 Holby TV awards. Her character Maggie Coldwell won "Favourites" in four categories for Series 22 (Female, All-Time Female, Character Most Want to Return, and Best Couple) at the 2008 Holby TV Awards.
