= Eva Fontaine =

British actress

- Born: 1974 (age 51–52); London, England
- Education: Anna Scher Theatre School; Webber Douglas Academy of Dramatic Art; Royal Holloway (BA Hons)
- Occupation: Actress
- Years active: 1991–present
- Television: Doctors

Eva Fontaine (born 1974) is a British actress, known for her role as Faith Walker in the BBC soap opera Doctors between 2001 and 2006. The role gave her nominations for the British Soap Award for Best Actress. As well as also having recurring roles in soap operas EastEnders and Emmerdale, Fontaine has an extensive stage career.

== Life and career ==
Fontaine received her training as an actress at the Anna Scher Theatre School. She attained a BA Hons at the Royal Holloway, as well as completing additional training at Webber Douglas Academy of Dramatic Art, Mountview Academy of Theatre Arts and the Actors Centre. Fontaine was a member of the British Shakespeare Company, playing Juliet in their touring production of Romeo and Juliet. She later played the leading character of Fran in the 2001 British horror film Dead Creatures. From 2001 to 2006, Fontaine portrayed the role of Faith Walker in the BBC soap opera Doctors. Her portrayal of the role resulted in numerous nominations for the British Soap Award for Best Actress.

From 2018 to 2019, Fontaine appeared in the ITV soap opera Emmerdale, as Dr Hamley. Later in 2019, she appeared in the BBC soap opera EastEnders as Claire Amartey, a case worker for Ruby Allen (Louisa Lytton). She appeared in five episodes. She returned in 2024, this time as detective sergeant who arrests Gideon Clayton (Howard Saddler). In 2021, she returned to Emmerdale, this time as Esme.

== Filmography ==
| Year | Title | Role | Notes |
|---|---|---|---|
| 2001 | Dead Creatures | Fran | Film |
| 2001–2006 | Doctors | Faith Walker | Regular role |
| 2011 | Casualty | DS Bain | Recurring role |
| 2018 | Eddie Elise | Probation Officer | Short film |
| 2018 | Two for Joy | Social Worker | Film |
| 2018–2019 | Emmerdale | Consultant | Recurring role |
| 2019 | Holby City | Simone Milton | Episode: "Remember, Remember" |
| 2019, 2024 | EastEnders | Claire Amartey | Recurring role |
| 2020 | Miracle Workers | Gladys | Recurring role |
| 2020 | There She Goes | Dr. Saggat | Episode: "Speech and Language" |
| 2021 | Control | India Collins | Short film |
| 2021–2022 | Emmerdale | Esme | Recurring role |
| 2022 | Not Going Out | Jane | Episode: "Text" |
| 2023 | My Jerome | Dorothy | Short film |
| 2025 | Amandaland | Mrs. Leary | Episode: "New Job" |
| 2025 | Football Fantastics | Fern | Recurring role |

== Awards and nominations ==
| Year | Ceremony | Category | Nominated work | Result | Ref. |
|---|---|---|---|---|---|
| 2005 | British Soap Awards | Best Actress | Doctors | Nominated | |
| 2006 | British Soap Awards | Best Actress | Doctors | Nominated | |
