= List of Emmerdale characters introduced in 2024 =

Emmerdale is a British ITV soap opera that first aired on 16 October 1972. The following characters debuted in 2024. Ella Forster (Paula Lane) made first appearance in January, as did Ruby Miligan (Beth Cordingly), the wife of Caleb Miligan (William Ash) and the mother of his son, Nicky Miligan (Lewis Cope). Rose Jackson (Christine Tremarco), the estranged ex-wife of Will Taylor (Dean Andrews) and mother of Dawn Fletcher (Olivia Bromley), debuted in April. In June, Josh Cope (Osian Morgan), the transphobic friend of Samson Dingle (Sam Hall) arrived in the village, followed in August by John Sugden (Oliver Farnworth), the long-lost son of Jack Sugden (Clive Hornby) and half-brother of Victoria Sugden (Isabel Hodgins) arrived. He was followed by Helen Fox (Sharon Maughan), Ruby's mother, and DS Foy (Robert Cavanah), a police officer investigating Belle King's (Eden Taylor-Draper) attack on her husband Thomas King (James Chase) with an axe, in September. In October, boxing promoter, Jade Garrick (Twinnie-Lee Moore) made her first appearance, followed by Caleb and Ruby's daughter, Steph Miligan (Georgia Jay) and Ruby's father, Anthony Fox (Nicholas Day) in November. Additionally, several other characters appeared throughout the year.

== Ella Forster ==
Ella Forster, played by Paula Lane, made her first appearance on 16 January 2024. The character and casting was announced on 21 November 2023, with it being reported that Lane would begin filming that same month. Ella was described as "compassionate and caring" and "far from a pushover" and it was teased that it would not be long until Ella is "turning heads in the village". Ella will meet Mandy Dingle (Lisa Riley) and her partner, Paddy Kirk (Dominic Brunt), at the veterinary ball, which will lead to Ella losing her job after sticking up for Mandy, but then find luck when she has a "chance encounter" with local doctor Manpreet Sharma (Rebecca Sarker). Speaking about her casting, Lane, known for her role as Kylie Platt in another ITV soap opera, Coronation Street, said that was she was excited to be joining the Emmerdale cast, adding: "Everyone has been so welcoming and I can't wait to start a new chapter playing the role of Ella. I've already heard there are big plans for her and I can't wait to see her navigate a new life in the village and hopefully make some friends!"

== Ruby Miligan ==
Ruby Miligan
- Emmerdale character
- Portrayed by: Beth Cordingly; Rachel Alsop (flashbacks)
- Duration: 2024–present
- First appearance: Episode 9899; 25 January 2024
- Introduced by: Laura Shaw and Kate Brooks
In-universe information
- Other names: Ruby Fox-Miligan
- Father: Anthony Fox
- Mother: Helen Fox
- Half-sisters: Steph Miligan
- Husband: Caleb Miligan
- Sons: Nicky Miligan
- Daughters: Steph Miligan

Ruby Miligan (also Fox-Miligan), played by Beth Cordingly, made her first appearance on 25 January 2024. Ruby is the wife of Caleb Miligan (William Ash) and the mother of his son, Nicky Miligan (Lewis Cope). Emmerdale producer Laura Shaw teased the character's arrival in October 2023 when she said that the affair between Caleb and Tracy Metcalfe (Amy Walsh) would lead to a "new arrival" who would cause uproar, which Shaw was excited about. The following month, the character was officially announced by Shaw at an Emmerdale press event, though the portrayer of the character was not revealed. On 6 December 2023, Jessica Sansome of the Manchester Evening News confirmed that Beth Cordingly had been cast as Ruby. Of her casting, Cordingly stated "I'm delighted to be joining the cast of Emmerdale, it's an enormous privilege and Ruby is a dream role. She's a firecracker and a troublemaker and I think people will love her or hate her, and I can't wait to get stuck in with this fabulous cast."

Speaking of the character, Shaw teased "We've heard mention before of [Ruby] and we've just heard little bits from Caleb saying it's 'all over between them' and that 'there's nothing going on' but is that really true? In the new year we will see Ruby bursting onto our screens. She is an absolute firecracker. She's going to put a real spanner into the Dingles. Is her and Caleb's relationship really over as he's made out? We'll find out in the new year. Fans will have to wait and see who bosses have cast as the feisty newcomer." The character was later billed as "fiery, confident, unpredictable and a fiercely devoted mum." Sansome (Manchester Evening News) reported that Ruby would "happily destroy" any family that Caleb has established on his own while he has been away from her, adding that "Ruby's a force to be reckoned with and a ticking time bomb." Producer Kate Brooks said the character had "scores to settle" and being loyal to her family, she will protect them by any means. Brooks also said that Ruby and Caleb's relationship is both passionate and volatile.

In November 2024, Georgia Jay and Nicholas Day were introduced to Emmerdale as Ruby's daughter Steph Miligan and father Anthony Fox respectively. Ruby has tried to rebuild bridges with Steph since her arrival, but Anthony's presence in the village makes her uneasy. On 30 November 2024, it was announced that a special flashback episode which aired on 12 December 2024 which would show Ruby's sixteenth birthday party in 1992. These scenes were described to give viewers a "surprising insight into Ruby's past." When these scenes aired, it was confirmed that Ruby was sexually abused by her father on her 16th birthday. Speaking about the flashback episode, Emmerdale producer, Laura Shaw said: "Ruby has always been troubled and volatile in nature, and finally our audience will be able to learn more about the past that has haunted her and made Ruby the woman she is today." Rachel Alsop played Ruby in these flashback scenes. During the episode broadcast on 28 April 2025, the character announced her intention to change her surname to Miligan, and this was reflected in the closing credits.

For her role as Ruby, Cordingly was longlisted for "Best Newcomer" and "Best Villain" at the 2024 Inside Soap Awards. Of the character's arrival, Claire Crick from What to Watch wrote that "Fans' prayers have been answered". Following the character's debut, Laura-Jayne Tyler from Inside Soap wrote that "Ruby's our new favourite character of 2024, and we'll fight anyone who says otherwise."

== Rose Jackson ==
Rose Jackson
- Emmerdale character
- Portrayed by: Christine Tremarco
- First appearance: Episode 9977; 25 April 2024
- Last appearance: Episode 10,074; 26 August 2024
- Introduced by: Laura Shaw
In-universe information
- Husband: Will Taylor (backstory)
- Daughters: Dawn Fletcher
- Grandsons: Lucas Taylor; Evan Fletcher
- Granddaughters: Clemmie Reed (adoptive)

Rose Jackson, played by Christine Tremarco, made her first appearance on 25 April 2024. It was revealed that the character has been living abroad in Benidorm and is already known to established character, Will Taylor (Dean Andrews) and is going to "cause a stir" between him and his wife Kim Tate (Claire King). Brenna Cooper from Digital Spy reported that Rose's arrival will "ruffle feathers between the couple after Will fails to mention to his wife that he knows the bolshy and boisterous new arrival." Of her casting, Tremarco said, "I am thrilled to be joining Emmerdale! To be working with such a wonderful cast and crew along with the brilliant writing and production team is an absolute joy! Rose is so much fun to play. She is free-spirited, boisterous and totally mischievous with a steely edge and a big heart." Emmerdale producer Laura Shaw added the Emmerdale team was "massively delighted to welcome Christine Tremarco to the Emmerdale family." When Rose first appears in Emmerdale, she is visited by Will, who is not happy with her arrival. It is later revealed that she is his ex-wife and also the mother of his daughter, Dawn Fletcher (Olivia Bromley).

Laura-Jayne Tyler from Inside Soap commented on how fans were speculating on social media that Rose would be a donor match for her grandson, Evan Fletcher, with Tyler suspecting that they are "right". Tyler's colleague, Gary Gillatt, called Rose "wonderfully bumptious" and said that she was "seemingly invented to spit venom at Kim". Chloe Timms from the same magazine believed that Rose had "Faith Dingle energy".

== Josh Cope ==
Josh Cope
- Emmerdale character
- Portrayed by: Osian Morgan
- First appearance: Episode 10,009; 3 June 2024
- Last appearance: Episode 10,056; 5 August 2024
- Introduced by: Laura Shaw

Josh Cope, played by Osian Morgan, made his first appearance on the 3 June 2024. His casting was announced on 23 May 2024, with it being teased that the character would be "stirring trouble" in the village and be involved in a new storyline with Samson Dingle (Sam Hall). Josh is introduced as the transphobic friend of Samson, who he has a drink with at The Hide where Matty Barton (Ash Palmisciano) and his wife Amy (Natalie Ann Jamieson) work. Josh begins to flirt with Amy, which makes her feel uncomfortable and subsequently decided to leave work early as she can't cope with Josh's constant flirting. Matty asks the two boys to leave the premises, Josh then threatens Matty, who is holding a knife whilst chopping vegetables, asking him for the cash till. Matty refuses and Josh pushes Samson into him and Samson ends up getting stabbed by accident.

Daniel Kilkelly from Digital Spy found problems within the storyline such as a "lack of build-up" as Josh was only introduced three days before the stabbing took place. He also said that Josh has "a hold on Samson" and "it's not clear enough why Samson is scared to speak up against Josh, but has no problem defying his dangerous relative Cain Dingle (Jeff Hordley), who wants him to change his story." Kilkelly also said it would have been "more effective to see Samson and Josh's friendship grow over a period of weeks rather than days, even if they were playing minor roles in episodes before eventually coming to the forefront."

== Les Carmichael ==
Les Carmichael
- Emmerdale character
- Portrayed by: Stacy J Gough
- First appearance: Episode 10,025/6; 27 June 2024
- Last appearance: Episode 10,034; 9 July 2024
- Introduced by: Laura Shaw
In-universe information
- Occupation: Prisoner

Les Carmichael, portrayed by Stacy J Gough, was Matty Barton's (Ash Palmisciano) cellmate in HMP Hotten. Gough's casting was announced on 25 June 2024, two days before his character's first appearance. Matty confides in Les about being transgender and Les helps him by telling him how to behave in prison. He confirms that he will mind his own business regarding Matty's life, but warns him that other prisoners aren't so kind. He also protects Matty from another inmate named Robbo (John O'Neil), who tries to get the lowdown on Matty.

Palmisciano spoke about the importance of tackling transphobia in the plot, explaining that the show has aimed to portray "how vulnerable Matty can be in a situation like [Josh's taunts]. Not everyone is super accepting," he said, adding: "It is great Matty's got that support. It's lovely to tell, we showed the wedding recently, it was an exciting joyous moment. It looked so incredible on screen. But sometimes we need to show the flip side of that, how it could go the other way and could be quite cruel for someone like Matty. It shows the bigger picture of what it is like to be him. I was really excited, and it's fantastic we get to mirror that and to tell that story."

== Robbo ==
Robbo
- Emmerdale character
- Portrayed by: John O'Neil
- First appearance: Episode 10,030/1; 4 July 2024
- Last appearance: Episode 10,039/40; 17 July 2024
- Introduced by: Laura Shaw
In-universe information
- Occupation: Prisoner

Robbo, played by John O'Neil, was a transphobic inmate at the prison HMP Hotten, where Matty Barton (Ash Palmisciano) was after accidentally stabbing Samson Dingle (Sam Hall) after being pushed by Josh Cope (Oisian Morgan) whilst holding a knife after chopping fruit. O'Neil's casting was announced on 2 July 2024, two days before his first appearance, however the character was announced on 25 June 2024. When Matty first arrived in prison, he kept being transgender to himself and confided in Les Carmichael (Stacy J Gough), however Robbo discovered that Matty was hiding something. Robbo was curious to find out what Matty was hiding, so when he was visited by his wife, Amy Barton (Natalie Ann Jamieson), Robbo approached her and finds out his secret from her as she thinks he is Les.

Palmisciano spoke about the importance of tackling transphobia in the plot, explaining that the show has aimed to portray "how vulnerable Matty can be in a situation like [Josh's taunts]. Not everyone is super accepting," he said, adding: "It is great Matty's got that support. It's lovely to tell, we showed the wedding recently, it was an exciting joyous moment. It looked so incredible on screen. But sometimes we need to show the flip side of that, how it could go the other way and could be quite cruel for someone like Matty. It shows the bigger picture of what it is like to be him. I was really excited, and it's fantastic we get to mirror that and to tell that story." O'Neill and Palmisciano's relationship off-screen has been described to be more "harmonious." Palmisciano posted behind the scenes photos on Instagram with O'Neill and Gough with the caption: "The nicest prison baddie I could be working with and the best prison mate ever, hats off to you both." O'Neill also posted some photos with the caption: "Had an absolute blast shooting on this job. We did laugh outside of the takes, promise."

== John Sugden ==
John Sugden
- Emmerdale character
- Portrayed by: Oliver Farnworth
- Duration: 2024–2026
- First appearance: Episode 10,058; 7 August 2024
- Last appearance: Episode 10,484; 6 January 2026
- Introduced by: Iain MacLeod
- Crossover appearances: Corriedale (2026)
In-universe information
- Occupation: Farmhand; Army Doctor; Paramedic Practitioner
- Family: Sugden
- Father: Jack Sugden
- Mother: Barbara
- Half-brothers: Jackie Merrick; Robert Sugden; Andy Sugden (adoptive)
- Half-sisters: Victoria Sugden
- Husband: Aaron Dingle (2025–2026)
- Uncles: Joe Sugden
- Nephews: Jack Sugden (adoptive); Harry Sugden; Sebastian White
- Nieces: Sarah Sugden (adoptive)

John Sugden, played by Oliver Farnworth, made his first appearance on 7 August 2024. His casting was announced on 2 July 2024, and he is the half-brother of Victoria Sugden (Isabel Hodgins). His arrival is set to "cause chaos" for Victoria, who alongside her young son Harry Sugden (Adam Pryor) and adoptive niece Sarah Sugden (Katie Hill), are the only members of the Sugden family left in Emmerdale. John's arrival is also due to "introduce a new generation of the long-running Sugden family, who have been in the programme since it debuted in 1972. John is also set to "catch the eye" of a particular resident, which will "cause lots of drama." How John is related to Victoria had not been confirmed when Farnworth's casting was announced, however on 29 July 2024, it was revealed that he was Victoria's half-brother. His arrival is "bound to raise plenty of questions." John's character has been described to be "brooding and mysterious" and will introduce "fresh challenges and intriguing relationships" for those already living in the village. It was confirmed on 31 July 2024 that John is "openly gay" and has a "military past" according to Farnworth.

Emmerdale executive producer, Laura Shaw said that everyone at Emmerdale "thrilled to have an actor with Oliver's talent and presence join the Emmerdale family". She also reflected on the significance of his place within the Sugden family, "the Sugdens have always been central to Emmerdale, and introducing a new member opens up exciting possibilities for future storylines. Mysterious John's arrival will no doubt create a stir in the village for Victoria and the wider community." Farnworth has played roles in other soap operas, such as Coronation Street and Hollyoaks, and following those previous roles, Farnworth revealed he is "absolutely delighted to be joining the cast of Emmerdale. The show has such a rich history, and the Sugden family is integral to that. I'm looking forward to bringing my character to life and working with such a talented and dedicated team." Danny Miller, who plays Aaron Dingle, reported to Digital Spy that his character will feature in scenes with John. He reported: "There's a Sugden coming in. With the history that Aaron has with Robert, it'll be interesting to see what happens with them. It's going to be an interesting few months, which is great." On 31 July 2024, Farnworth described more about his character: "He’s got a pretty amazing backstory. Obviously, half-brother to Victoria, which we find out quite quickly. But there's a whole lot of depth to him, and little bits just kind of coming out now, but it’s been a whirlwind. I’ve been here, there and everywhere. I’ve been on all the sets. We’ve been on location, been driving vans, been getting up to all sorts of mischief. So, it’s been absolutely brilliant." Farnworth also considered joining the cast of Emmerdale as a "fixture", as he grew up in Yorkshire, however Farnworth knows the history of the Sugden family, but had to "put it aside" because his character "initially has no knowledge of the Sugdens' history in Emmerdale and he has no desire to be part of it.". On 11 August 2025, it was announced that Farnworth had quit his role as John, just after a year on the show and would leave once his storyline had ended.

== Peter Mansfield ==
Peter Mansfield
- Emmerdale character
- Portrayed by: David Michaels
- First appearance: Episode 10,080; 2 September 2024
- Last appearance: Episode 10,171; 24 December 2024
- Introduced by: Iain MacLeod
In-universe information
- Occupation: Financial Advisor

Peter Mansfield, portrayed by David Michaels, is Kim Tate's (Claire King) financial advisor whom she slept with after her husband, Will Taylor (Dean Andrews) cheated on her with his ex-wife Rose Jackson (Christine Tremarco). It was later revealed that Will and Peter have been plotting to take down Kim. He made his first appearance on 2 September 2024. As the plot developed, Olivia Wheeler from Leicester Mercury described Peter to have a more "sinister side" to him. Wheeler also explained that fans recognised Michaels: "Emmerdale fans have been gripped by the relationship break down of Kim Tate and Will Taylor - but viewers have recognised a familiar face in the love triangle."

As the plot continued, Peter teamed up with Will to take Kim down and it was revealed that they were working for someone. On 24 November 2024, it was revealed that it was Joe Tate (Ned Porteous) who was "pulling the strings" as described by Helen Daly from Radio Times.

== Helen Fox ==
Helen Fox
- Emmerdale character
- Portrayed by: Sharon Maughan
- First appearance: Episode 10,092; 17 September 2024
- Last appearance: Episode 10,161; 12 December 2024
- Introduced by: Iain MacLeod
In-universe information
- Husband: Anthony Fox (backstory)
- Daughters: Ruby Fox-Miligan
- Grandsons: Nicky Miligan
- Granddaughters: Steph Miligan

Helen Fox made her first appearance on 17 September 2024. She is the estranged mother of Ruby Fox-Miligan (Beth Cordingly) who she hasn't seen in 30 years. She is played by Sharon Maughan. Helen's arrival has been described to expose Ruby and her husband Caleb Miligan's (William Ash) past. Speaking to Manchester Evening News, Ash revealed that Helen and her husband cut Ruby out of their lives because they didn't approve of her relationship with Caleb, as he was from a care home and they thought he was "beneath" her. He explained: "They hated him because he’d come out of a care home, he didn’t have any family and thought he was beneath their daughter. So, Helen was really snobby and judgemental. Helen and Ruby’s dad gave Ruby an ultimatum. They basically said ‘look if you want to be with this boy then we don’t want anything to do with you’. They basically just cut Ruby dead." Due to affect their potential reunion, Ash explained that Caleb does not trust Helen: "Because she’s been so manipulative and behaved terribly in the past, he just doesn’t trust anything that she’d ever say. He decides to go just to see what she actually wants – because if she is on her deathbed, then maybe Ruby does need some kind of closure and there's a potential for sorting it out. As it turns out, that’s not what happens…"

Ash spoke about working with Maughan: "She is an amazing actress because she only comes in for two episodes. We only had a day filming. We were doing all these intense scenes together in a hospital room, in a private hospital, just me and her going at each other really. She was amazing. It is hard to come into any show, to just do one day, and have lots of intense scenes. But she was fantastic and really a force of nature really." He also said how this meeting would make Ruby feel: "I think he knows that if she finds out he’s been to see Helen and he’s gone behind her back, she will be furious. There will be a real question of whether she can trust him ever again. The stakes are massive in that moment." Helen died on 18 September 2024. Maughan reprised the role of Helen for flashback scenes showing Ruby's past on 12 December 2024.

== DS Foy ==
DS Foy
- Emmerdale character
- Portrayed by: Robert Cavanah
- First appearance: Episode 10,103; 30 September 2024
- Last appearance: Episode 10,150; 28 November 2024
- Introduced by: Iain MacLeod
In-universe information
- Occupation: Detective Sergeant

Detective Sergeant Foy, played by Robert Cavanah, is a police officer who is investigating Belle King's (Eden Taylor-Draper) attack on her husband, Thomas King (James Chase). He made his first appearance on 30 September 2024. This was Cavanah's second role in Emmerdale after playing Ian Chamberlain, a man that Val Pollard (Charlie Hardwick) had a fling with in Portugal, that warns her that he may have HIV, which he may have passed onto her. Cavanah has also worked with co-star, Michelle Hardwick, who plays Vanessa Woodfield in Heartbeat spin-off series, The Royal.

On 3 October 2024, Emmerdale Insider reported that Foy had become a "hit" with the viewers. Carena Crawford reported: "New Emmerdale detective DS Foy has impressed viewers who are pleased there’s finally a police officer in the soap who knows what he’s doing! They like him so much they are demanding he becomes a regular character – but then no one would get away with anything!" On 27 November 2024, Tom was finally arrested and charged for his crimes by Foy, which Crawford described to make him the "hero of the hour".

== Jade Garrick ==
Jade Garrick
- Emmerdale character
- Portrayed by: Twinnie-Lee Moore
- First appearance: Episode 10,112; 11 October 2024
- Last appearance: Episode 10,175; 27 December 2024
- Introduced by: Iain Macleod
In-universe information
- Occupation: Boxing Promoter

Jade Garrick, played by Twinnie-Lee Moore, made her first appearance on 11 October 2024. Moore's casting was announced earlier that day, and would be appearing for a guest stint as an "ambitious and ruthless boxing promoter." She will be a part of Billy Fletcher's (Jay Kontzle) boxing storyline, where he has been taking part in unlicensed boxing matches. Helen Daly from Radio Times reported that Billy's boxing experience would become more dangerous with her arrival, whereas Sara Baalla from Digital Spy reported: "Jade arrives with an agenda that doesn't involve Billy's safety." Baalla also described Jade to be a "ruthless" boxing promoter. Dan Laurie from Manchester Evening News described: "Jade's 'true' intentions are far from altruistic, and Billy's well-being is not her top priority."

Moore spoke about her casting in Emmerdale: "My life has been a bit crazy recently juggling music and acting with lots of back and forth between Nashville and Yorkshire but I've been loving it! I've loved being back on screen, especially as the show is shot in Yorkshire, being able to be home with family and go to work on such an iconic show has been nothing short of amazing! The whole team has been so welcoming and really supportive. My character is so much fun to play and I can't wait to see how the audience reacts to her." After Moore made her first appearance, Elizabeth Mackley from Leeds Live reported that fans had mixed reactions to Jade's first appearance, with some recognising her from her Hollyoaks role as series regular, Porsche McQueen. Others were intrigued, whilst others were "less than impressed" by a new villain's arrival. Joel Harley from Emmerdale Insider reported that Jade is "iconic" and that "Emmerdale desperately needs a new female villain."

During an illegal fight between Billy and Ross Barton (Michael Parr), £10,000 was stolen from Jade. As a result, she goes after Ross believing he stole the money, when it was actually Mackenzie Boyd (Lawrence Robb). For revenge, Jade and her henchmen abducted April Windsor (Amelia Flanagan) and dangled her over the edge of the multi-storey car park where her mother and Ross' ex-girlfriend, Donna Windsor (Verity Rushworth) was dangled over by Gary North (Fegus O'Donnell) where both subsequently died ten years earlier. These scenes received 62 Ofcom complaints.

== Deano ==
Deano
- Emmerdale character
- Portrayed by: Luke Delaney
- Appears in: Episode 10,167/8; 19 December 2024
- Introduced by: Iain MacLeod

Deano, portrayed by Luke Delaney, was introduced as part of Ross Barton's (Michael Parr) illegal fighting storyline. Delaney's casting was announced on 30 October 2024, however the name of his character hadn't been announced. His agency, Atius Management posted: "We are delighted to share the news that our brilliant Luke Delaney has been busy filming a major guest lead role on Emmerdale which will hit our screens soon." Delaney made his appearance on 7 November 2024. This was Delaney's second role after playing a Masseuse in 2020. Deano was seen at an illegal fight organised by Ross at Butler's Farm, where he brought Aaron Dingle (Danny Miller) along in case things went wrong. The events did get out of hand which leads to Deano punching Aaron, critically injuring him.

== Steph Miligan ==
Steph Miligan
- Emmerdale character
- Portrayed by: Georgia Jay
- Duration: 2024–2025
- First appearance: Episode 10,139; 15 November 2024
- Last appearance: Episode 10,360; 7 August 2025
- Created by: Laura Shaw and Sophie Roper
- Introduced by: Iain MacLeod
In-universe information
- Father: Anthony Fox
- Mother: Ruby Fox-Miligan
- Adoptive father: Caleb Miligan
- Half-brothers: Nicky Miligan
- Half-sisters: Ruby Fox-Miligan
- Grandfathers: Anthony Fox
- Grandmothers: Helen Fox
- Uncles: Cain Dingle (adoptive)
- Aunts: Chas Dingle (adoptive)
- Nephews: Nicky Miligan
- First cousins: Aaron Dingle (adoptive); Joe Tate (adoptive)

Steph Miligan, played by Georgia Jay, made her first appearance on the 15 November 2024, she is the estranged daughter of Caleb Miligan (William Ash) and Ruby Fox-Miligan (Beth Cordingly), who is due to arrive with her grandfather Anthony Fox (Nicholas Day). Jay and Day's castings were announced on 2 November 2024 and their arrivals were described to have "far-reaching repercussions" for the Miligan family. Craig Jones from Leeds Live described Steph's character to be "amart, confident and completely reckless," and "it’s clear that Steph got all the best and worst parts of her parents, including their narcissistic need to win at all costs." It has also been revealed that Steph hasn't seen her parents in over a decade.

Jay was "thrilled" about joining the soap and praised the cast for being welcoming; she was also excited to see what was in store for Steph due to her "intriguing" backstory. Emmerdale producer, Sophie Roper also commented on Day and Jay's castings: "We’re delighted to be welcoming Nicholas and Georgia to Emmerdale as part of the Miligan family. With so much yet to discover about Ruby, the arrival of her father and daughter will unlock her past and see Ruby and Caleb tested in ways we’ve never seen before. With two actors of such great calibre, they’re certainly set to make their mark on the Dales." Ash, who plays Steph's father, praised Jay's casting.

In 2025, Jay took maternity leave from Emmerdale. She took an extended leave, but later confirmed that she had decided to leave the serial permanently to focus on motherhood. She has clarified that she is open to a return in the future.

== Anthony Fox ==
Anthony Fox
- Emmerdale character
- Portrayed by: Nicholas Day
- Duration: 2024–2025
- First appearance: Episode 10,141; 19 November 2024
- Last appearance: Episode 10,191; 30 January 2025
- Created by: Laura Shaw and Sophie Roper
- Introduced by: Iain MacLeod
In-universe information
- Occupation: Architect
- Wife: Helen Fox (backstory)
- Daughters: Ruby Fox-Miligan; Steph Miligan
- Grandsons: Nicky Miligan
- Granddaughters: Steph Miligan

Anthony Fox, played by Nicholas Day, made his first appearance on the 19 November 2024, he is the estranged father of Ruby Fox-Miligan (Beth Cordingly), who arrives with his granddaughter, Steph Miligan (Georgia Jay). Day and Jay's castings were announced on 2 November 2024 and their arrivals have been described to have "far-reaching repercussions for the Miligan family." Craig Jones from Leeds Live described Anthony's character to be "charismatic" and to have "mellowed in his old age and he seems like delightful company to the outside world." However, it has been revealed that Ruby hasn't seen Anthony in 30 years. Anthony's arrival in Emmerdale makes Ruby feel uncomfortable.

Day felt very welcomed by his Emmerdale colleagues and called the other actors of the Miligan family "great to work with", adding that the "scenes just fly" and that he felt "blessed" Emmerdale producer, Sophie Roper, was "delighted" by Day and Jay's castings, adding, "With so much yet to discover about Ruby, the arrival of her father and daughter will unlock her past and see Ruby and Caleb tested in ways we've never seen before. With two actors of such great calibre, they're certainly set to make their mark on the Dales." After Anthony's arrival, it was announced on 30 November 2024 that a special flashback episode, which aired on 12 December 2024, would show the events of Ruby's sixteenth birthday party in 1992. These scenes were described to give viewers a "surprising insight" into Ruby's past and why she is unsettled by Anthony's arrival. When these scenes aired, it was confirmed that Anthony sexually abused Ruby on her 16th birthday.

On 14 January 2025, it was announced that Anthony would be killed-off in a "whodunit" storyline the following week. Daniel Kilkelly from Digital Spy announced: "The evil villain is murdered after news of his crimes spreads around the village, leaving several suspects in the frame." Two suspects revealed were Ruby's husband, Caleb Miligan (William Ash) and sister-in-law, Chas Dingle (Lucy Pargeter) who discover the abuse that Anthony subjected her to as a child. Other suspects named by Kilkelly were: Nicola King (Nicola Wheeler), Laurel Thomas (Charlotte Bellamy), Cain Dingle (Jeff Hordley) and Aaron Dingle (Danny Miller).

== Karl ==
Karl
- Emmerdale character
- Portrayed by: Charles Dale
- Appears in: Episode 10,167/8; 19 December 2024
- Introduced by: Iain MacLeod
In-universe information
- Occupation: Jury Member

Karl, portrayed by Charles Dale, is a member of the jury, who appeared in court at Tom King's (James Chase) trial, which aired on 19 December 2024. His casting was announced on 12 November 2024, alongside Denise Welch, who played jury member, Heidi, and Jack Ellis, who also played a jury member named Kenneth. Iona Rowan from Digital Spy reported: "Emmerdale has confirmed three big guest stars who will be involved in the conclusion of Tom and Belle King's (Eden Taylor-Draper) abuse storyline." Unlike Welch, who had already been announced to be portraying a jury member, Ellis and Dale's characters were left "undisclosed," however both were confirmed to also be jury members on 5 December 2024. Emmerdale producer Laura Shaw confirmed the soap would "break from its usual format in the special episode by sharing the real stories of domestic abuse victims and survivors."

== Heidi ==
Heidi
- Emmerdale character
- Portrayed by: Denise Welch
- Appears in: Episode 10,167/8; 19 December 2024
- Introduced by: Iain MacLeod
In-universe information
- Occupation: Jury Member

Heidi, portrayed by Denise Welch, is a member of the jury, who appeared in court at Tom King's (James Chase) trial on 19 December 2024. Her casting was announced on 12 November 2024, alongside Jack Ellis, who played jury member, Kenneth, and Charles Dale, who also played a jury member named Karl. Iona Rowan from Digital Spy reported: "Emmerdale has confirmed three big guest stars who will be involved in the conclusion of Tom and Belle King's (Eden Taylor-Draper) abuse storyline." Upon casting, Welch had already been announced to be a jury member, whereas Ellis and Dale's characters were left "undisclosed." Rowan also described Welch's casting to "add to Welch's already-long list of soap acting credits, with the star having previously had roles in Coronation Street, Waterloo Road, EastEnders, Hollyoaks, Doctors, Casualty, and Holby City." Emmerdale producer Laura Shaw confirmed the soap would "break from its usual format in the special episode by sharing the real stories of domestic abuse victims and survivors."

Welch commented on her casting and excitedly told her audience on Loose Women, whom she is a regular panellist on: "I'm going to be in Emmerdale! It's a one-off one hour special and it's the first time Emmerdale have ever done it. And for those of you who are fans of Emmerdale, there is a very powerful year-long story of domestic abuse. Which of course, appealed to me when I knew I'd be part of it because of our Facing It Together campaign, and this is a culmination of that story." She continued: "The episode takes place exclusively between the court and the jury and I am one of the head's of the jury called Heidi. Obviously, I can't say what the outcome is, but it's a very, very powerful episode and some of the lines are taken from true cases. Refuge have seen it and they're thrilled with how it's been depicted so it was incredible to be a part of it, and that's on I think December 19." Katie Wilson from The Mirror described Welch's Emmerdale role to be a "milestone."

== Kenneth ==
Kenneth
- Emmerdale character
- Portrayed by: Jack Ellis
- Appears in: Episode 10,167/8; 19 December 2024
- Introduced by: Iain MacLeod
In-universe information
- Occupation: Jury Member

Kenneth, portrayed by Jack Ellis, is a member of the jury, who appeared in court at Tom King's (James Chase) trial, which aired on 19 December 2024. His casting was announced on 12 November 2024, alongside Denise Welch, who played jury member, Heidi, and Charles Dale, who played a jury member named Karl. Iona Rowan from Digital Spy reported: "Emmerdale has confirmed three big guest stars who will be involved in the conclusion of Tom and Belle King's (Eden Taylor-Draper) abuse storyline." Unlike Welch, who had already been announced to be portraying a jury member, Ellis and Dale's characters were left "undisclosed," however both were confirmed to also be jury members on 5 December 2024. Emmerdale producer Laura Shaw confirmed the soap would "break from its usual format in the special episode by sharing the real stories of domestic abuse victims and survivors."

== Anna Finsbury ==
Anna Finsbury
- Emmerdale character
- Portrayed by: Rhea Bailey
- Duration: 2024–2025
- First appearance: Episode 10,176; 30 December 2024
- Last appearance: Episode 10,209; 5 February 2025
- Introduced by: Iain MacLeod
In-universe information
- Occupation: Family liaison officer

Anna Finsbury, portrayed by Rhea Bailey, is a family liaison officer who visits Marlon Dingle (Mark Charnock) and Rhona Goskirk (Zoë Henry) after the disappearance of April Windsor (Amelia Flanagan). She made her first appearance on 30 December 2024. Bailey's casting was announced on 16 December 2024 by her agency. Upon Bailey's casting announcement, details of her character hadn't been announced. Jade Brown from Emmerdale Insider suggested that Bailey's role would be substantial. Brown also reported Anna "didn't have the news the family were hoping for" regarding finding April.

In January 2025, Joe Crutchley from Leicester Mercury reported how some viewers believed that Anna could be involved in April's disappearance.

== Other characters ==
Character	Episode date(s)	Actor	Circumstances
Jules Jefferson	16 January	Wayne Cater	A managing director of Bargain Vets, who hosts a vets function at the Hide Bar & Bistro.
Bill	20 February	Philip Buck	A solicitor of Amit Sharma (Anil Goutam).
Estate Agent	4 March	Micheal Thomas	An estate agent who appeared with Gus Malcolm.
Una	11 March	Rekha John-Cheriyan	A psychoanalyst who talks to Charity Dingle (Emma Atkins) about post-traumatic stress disorder.
Daniel	20 March	Ed White	A man who met with Suzy Merton (Martelle Edinborough) and Belle King (Eden Taylor-Draper) at Take A Vow in to discuss planning his wedding. After their meeting, Daniel told Suzy she was right about Belle being his perfect wedding planner and arranged dinner with Belle to finalise their agreement to work together. Daniel later emailed Suzy and Belle that he has decided not to work with them.
Dee	25, 27 March	Claire Cage	A loan shark who Amit Sharma (Anil Goutam) owed money to. Amit met up with Dee, who was angry that Amit still hadn't got her money. Amit tried to explain he was having a cash flow problem, but Dee was not interested in his excuses. Dee gave Amit two days and if she did not hear good news, they would meet again and she would bring a "friend" with her. As they were talking, Dee and Amit heard a noise nearby, as Eric Pollard (Chris Chittell), who was suspicious after Amit tried to scam money from him, had followed them, but they didn't see him.
Jenny	2 May–22 August	Dianne Pilkington	A nurse who treated Evan Fletcher, who was admitted to hospital after Evan's mother Dawn (Olivia Bromley) noticed a bruise on his leg, and was later diagnosed with acute lymphoblastic leukaemia.
Emily Masterson	6 May	Marilyn Cutts	A woman who goes into the veterinary with Tom King (James Chase). He then tells her that the dog has cancer but this is revealed to be untrue, so she leaves and says she will find another vet.
Parking Attendant	20 May	Ian Gain	A parking attendant who starts bothering Billy Fletcher (Jay Kontzle) about buying a parking ticket when the machine is broken, which frustrates him as he is in a hurry to see his son Evan (Malachi McKenzie), who is in hospital going through chemotherapy.
June Phillips	23 May	Tina Gray	The grandmother of a childhood friend of Ella Forster (Paula Lane), whom she visits in a care home as she has dementia.
Ollie	2 October–19 December	Alistair Toovey	Tom King's (James Chase) solicitor who he hires to represent him after he was attacked by his wife, Belle King (Eden Taylor-Draper) in the back with an axe in self-defence. Ollie attacked Tom with a branch outside the church, leaving him bloodied and bruised in a bid to try and frame Belle's half-brother, Sam Dingle (James Hooton). However, Ollie's conscience began to get the better of him and suggested Tom found another solicitor. As a result, Tom threatened to use some leverage he has over Ollie unless he continued to co-operate, suggesting Tom knows something about Ollie that he could expose if he backed out.
Rob	12 December	Frankie Minchella (2024; flashbacks); Josh Burdett (2025)	Ruby Fox-Miligan's (Beth Cordingly) childhood friend who appears in flashbacks from her 16th birthday party in 1992. He later appears when Ruby's husband, Caleb Miligan (William Ash), lures him to his house to attack him assuming that he raped Ruby, resulting in the conception of her daughter, Steph Miligan (Georgia Jay). Rob reveals he did not assault Ruby, and also mentions other information that leads to Caleb and his half-sister Chas Dingle (Lucy Pargeter) realising that it was Ruby's father Anthony Fox (Nicholas Day) who sexually abused her.
