= Meena Jutla =

Fictional character from Emmerdale

- Emmerdale character
- Portrayed by: Paige Sandhu
- Duration: 2020–2022
- First appearance: Episode 8845; 24 September 2020
- Last appearance: Episode 9340; 18 April 2022
- Introduced by: Jane Hudson
In-universe information
- Occupation: Nurse
- Sisters: Manpreet Sharma
- Husband: Jeremy (backstory)
- Nieces: Aiesha Richards

Meena Jutla is a fictional character from the ITV soap opera Emmerdale, played by Paige Sandhu. Details surrounding her casting and Meena's characterisation were announced in September 2020 alongside that of two other new characters as part of what Emmerdale described as a "big autumn shake-up". She was introduced as the estranged sister of Manpreet Sharma (Rebecca Sarker) and arrives in the fictional village with the intention of reconciling her relationship with Manpreet. Upon her casting, Sandhu described her character as irresponsible, apathetic, unreliable, wild and intelligent. She later revealed that Meena's backstory involves her often being ignored by her parents in favour of Manpreet, which led to Meena having sex with Manpreet's husband Dennis (Sam Barriscale), which led to their marriage breaking down, as well as her relationship with her sister.

Shortly after her introduction, Meena forms a relationship with David Metcalfe (Matthew Wolfenden). The beginning of her tenure sees her scheming to improve her relationships with David and Manpreet. Her actions included taking Rishi Sharma's (Bhasker Patel) medication so that she could rescue him and pretending to be Ethan Anderson's (Emile John) estranged mother, after which producers hinted that Meena would be at the "forefront of really brilliant and gripping drama". It was later confirmed that she would become an Emmerdale villain in a serial killer plot. Sandhu created a backstory for her character which included killing two off-screen characters; her own father and former best friend Nadine Butler. Her on-screen murders include village locals Leanna Cavanagh (Mimi Slinger), Andrea Tate (Anna Nightingale) and Ben Tucker (Simon Lennon). Meena is known to dance and sing along to pop music before committing a crime, as well as taking keepsakes from her victims after their deaths. She also becomes involved in the aftermath of the murders in order to see the reactions from those who are mourning. In January 2022, it was confirmed that Sandhu would be leaving the role.

For Sandhu's portrayal of the role, Meena won the award for Best Villain at the Inside Soap Awards twice, in 2021 and 2022, also garnering nominations for Best Newcomer, Best Show-Stopper and Best Actress. At the 2022 British Soap Awards, Sandhu won the award for Best Leading Performer, as well as receiving nominations for Villain of the Year and her serial killer storyline receiving a nod for Best Storyline. The role also saw Sandhu receive nominations at the TRIC Awards, National Television Awards, TV Choice Awards and the TVTimes Awards. Meena caused division in viewers' opinions since her introduction. After Meena is revealed to be a serial killer, critics and viewers began to praise the character and Sandhu's acting skills, with many believing Meena had become a "top soap serial killer". Duncan Lindsay of the Metro described Meena as "the most unique and entertaining soap villain ever" and admitted that he wanted her to get away with her crimes due to her strong presence on Emmerdale. Many viewers praised Meena and accredited her with being most interesting part of Emmerdale, while some have complained about the violence shown in her murderous scenes, with Ofcom receiving hundreds of complaints about her brutality. Despite criticism, Meena regularly trended on Twitter and her storyline increased Emmerdale's ratings to the point of becoming the most-watched soap opera in the United Kingdom. Fans of Meena, known as 'Meeniacs', called for ITV to commission a spin-off series about her and "mourned the loss of Meena" after her exit.

== Casting and characterisation ==
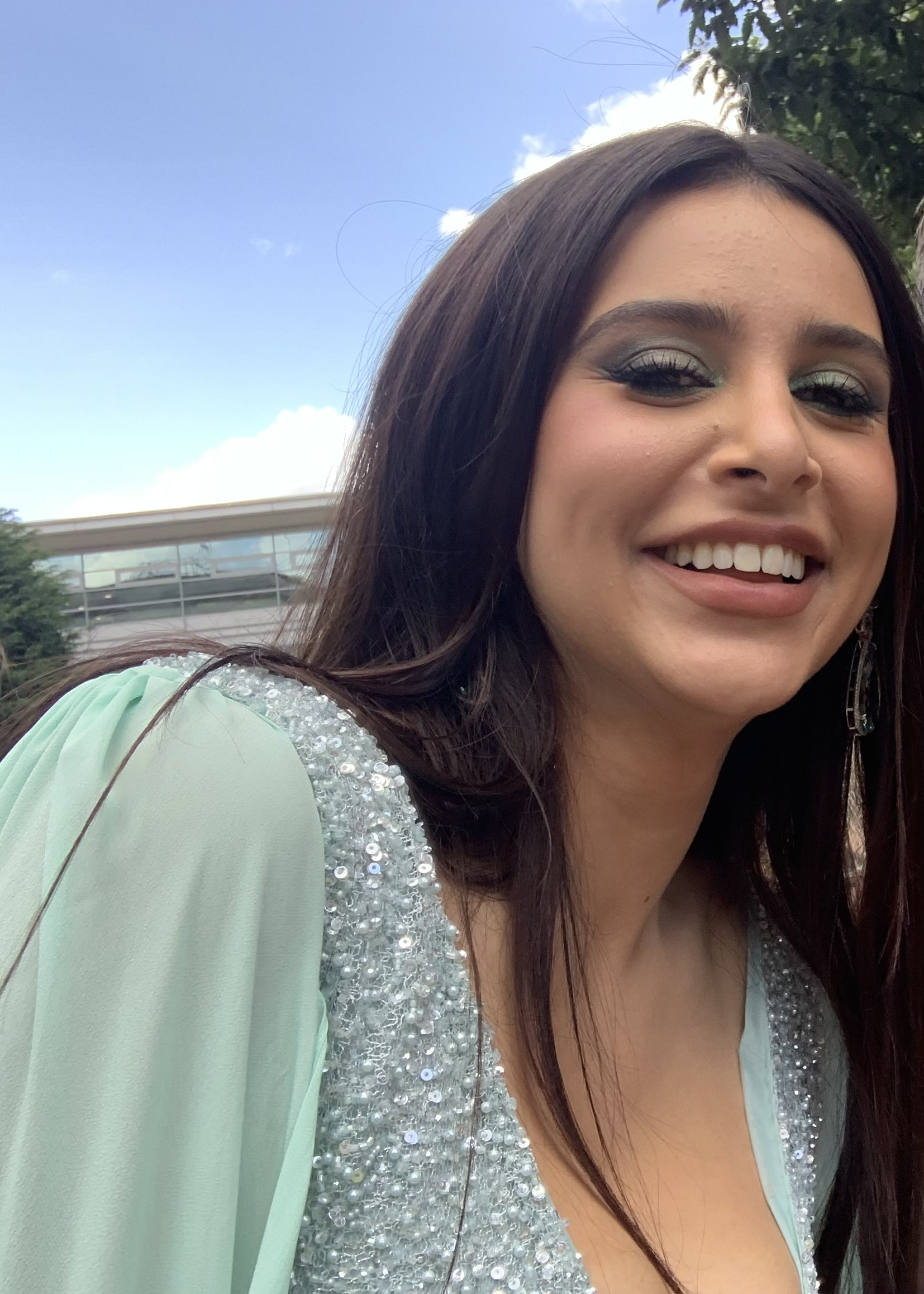
Sandhu created her own backstory for Meena.

Paige Sandhu's casting as Meena was announced by Emmerdale on 7 September 2020; she was announced as part of a "big autumn shake-up" alongside the castings of Lawrence Robb as Mackenzie Boyd and Simon Lennon as Ben Tucker. It was confirmed that Meena would be introduced as the estranged sister of established character Manpreet Sharma (Rebecca Sarker) and that the pair had fallen out in the past. Upon her casting, Sandhu described her character as fun and complex to play and she voiced her excitement at seeing how the viewers would react to her. She also stated that she had been enjoying filming with Sarker and Bhasker Patel, who plays Sarker's onscreen husband Rishi Sharma. On 24 September 2020, the day of Meena's first appearance, Sandhu revealed more details concerning her character. She stated that Meena is the opposite of her sister Manpreet, and that she is irresponsible, apathetic and unreliable, which she found enjoyable to portray. Sandhu also found Meena to be wild and intelligent, noting her talent for manipulating people. She explained: "She knows how to work people and she's a chameleon, depending on who she's talking to. She wonders: 'What can I get out of this person?'"

Explaining Meena's backstory, Sandhu stated that being the younger sister in her family led her to feel she is lower in the hierarchy of life. She views Manpreet as "the epitome of all that's good and great" and feels that she does not compare to her. Due to Meena growing up with an overachieving sister, Sandhu said that Meena had formed deeply rooted insecurities about herself due to not feeling good enough, which she covers up. The actress said that this backstory would be subtly explored in her scenes, as well as nods to her character having lived through recent depressing years. Sandhu also said that in order to enrich her character, she created a backstory where Meena has murdered two people prior to coming to Emmerdale. Sandhu stated that Meena's biggest weakness is her continued involvement with her murders. She explained that Meena loves to take a keepsake from her victims, such as Leanna's ring and Andrea's bracelet; the actress admitted that taking tokens from her victims and keeping them in a box is not clever. She also felt that although Meena is very clever, she should not stay involved with the crime, but explained that she has a fascination with death. She said: "When she's killed someone, she needs to still be involved in it. She wants to take complete ownership of that crime and so she watches people's reaction to that death, takes a token from the victim and stays around those people." When asked if she want Meena to face comeuppance for her crimes, Sandhu admitted that she wants Meena to keep getting away with her crimes due to enjoying portraying a serial killer.

== Development ==
=== Introduction ===
Meena arrives in the Emmerdale village stating that she has the intention of reconciling with Manpreet, with who she had fallen out with years prior to her arrival. Sandhu hinted that despite Meena saying this, there is always a selfish reason behind her actions. She was asked how the reunion between the two characters goes, to which she replied that there would be tension and drama. She noted that the drama is especially awkward for Meena since she is the person responsible for the rivalry between them. Manpreet reveals that Meena had sex with her ex-husband while the pair were still together, which led to the eventual breakdown of their marriage. Rishi takes a liking to Meena and recommends her for a job at the local doctor's surgery, where Manpreet also works. Manpreet sits in on her interview with Liam Cavanagh (Jonny McPherson), where she makes distasteful remarks about Meena's personality. Both Liam and Rishi voice their disapproval of Manpreet's treatment of Meena, leading Manpreet to forgive Meena and allow her to stay at her house.

As well as being introduced as Manpreet's sister, it was also confirmed that she would be a potential love interest for newly single Billy Fletcher (Jay Kontzle). Meena flirts with him in front of his ex-girlfriend, Dawn Taylor (Olivia Bromley), which leads to a confrontation between the pair. After the interactions between Meena and Dawn, Sandhu revealed that Meena will make several other enemies in the village. She noted that any strong women will be threatened by Meena since she enjoys annoying them. She also confirmed that alongside her rivalries, Meena would also pursue friendships on the programme with characters such as Rishi and Liam.

=== Scheming and villainous acts ===
In November 2020, Meena begins pursuing David Metcalfe (Matthew Wolfenden). Thinking that "David could be the man for her", she asks him on a date to which he accepts; however, he stands her up and texts her saying that he cannot come. Annoyed by David's rejection, she heads to his shop to confront him. Meena later learns that Manpreet was responsible for David standing her up, since her sister had advised David against dating her. Meena reacts by making a "shocking move" in order to win both Manpreet and David over. Meena purposely changes the direction of Rishi's Sat Nav, as well as taking his medication from the car and hiding Manpreet's phone. She pretends to come across Rishi in the direction she sent him and acts as though she has saved him. When Manpreet does not know how to thank Meena for saving Rishi's life, she suggests that Manpreet should talk to David about her again, in order to persuade him to give their relationship another chance. Speaking on Meena's actions, Sandhu guessed that the audience will not like Meena anymore since her character is "trying to steer the situation so that it comes out with her in the best possible position". She added that in Meena's position, her plan has succeeded since she has become a saviour in Manpreet's perspective. After Meena has won David back, Sandhu confirmed that viewers would continue to see more of Meena's dark side. She also warned viewers that her character has no limits as to how far she will go to get what she wants and confessed that she loves playing the new baddie of Emmerdale. Digital Spy then wrote in December 2020 that the soap were setting up a "dark direction" for Meena.

In April 2021, Sandhu teased to Inside Soap that her dream storyline would be airing soon. She could not give specific details on the storyline due to her contract but stated that it would be a storyline that viewers would look forward to watching. The storyline begins with Meena impersonating Ethan Anderson's (Emile John) estranged mother, manipulating his emotions by texting him from a burner phone. Digital Spy wrote that she "hatched this masterplan" with intentions of pushing Manpreet to comfort Ethan so that Manpreet would reunite with ex-lover Charles Anderson (Kevin Mathurin), Ethan's father. In June 2021, series producer Kate Brooks told the Daily Mirror that Meena's plot will elevate and "captivate" viewers as she joins the "forefront of really brilliant and gripping drama". Brooks also hinted that her scheming had formed the start of a "gripping and enthralling story" she hoped would get the nation talking and have viewers shouting at their televisions. Days later, Meena locks Andrea Tate's (Anna Nightingale) dog in a car to stop her from going on a camping trip with Charles. The scenes were part of her plan to reunite Manpreet with Charles, and following their airing, Meena was revealed to be Emmerdale's next major villain. She was tipped by Kilkelly (Digital Spy) as "one to watch" and guessed that she is "only just getting started".

Meena confides in Diane Sugden (Elizabeth Estensen) about her dead friend Nadine, telling her that she regrets not spotting suicidal tendencies in Nadine before she killed herself. However, Meena is later seen reading an old newspaper clipping that is titled: "Woman found dead in suspicious circumstances." The article also stated that Nadine was found dead in her car after inhaling carbon monoxide fumes and Kilkelly confirmed that Meena is linked to Nadine's death. Following the scenes, Digital Spy compiled a list of potential victims that Meena could murder, with the list including Manpreet, Andrea, Rishi, Diane, David's son Jacob (Joe-Warren Plant) and Jacob's girlfriend Leanna Cavanagh (Mimi Slinger), amongst others.

=== Leanna Cavanagh's murder ===
On 28 June 2021, it was confirmed by Emmerdale that Meena would murder a character in forthcoming scenes. That same day, a trailer including Meena, David, Jacob, Leanna, Gabby Thomas (Rosie Bentham) and Victoria Sugden (Isabel Hodgins) premiered on ITV, with media outlets confirming that the latter five would be the potential victims of her murder. Sandhu knew of the murder arc from when she was signed to Emmerdale and admitted that knowing where Meena's storyline would end up made it more fun for her to play her. Sandhu kept the storyline a secret from other cast members when they asked her what would happen to Meena and noted that they were shocked to learn Meena would be a murderer. Sandhu cited Killing Eve as an aid to learning about how serial killers operate and noted that Meena has similar qualities to Villanelle. To further prepare herself for the storyline, she watched films including Taxi Driver, American Psycho, Nightcrawler and Killer Women with Piers Morgan, as well as reading The Psychopath Test. Speaking on the scenes, Sandhu admitted that she loves playing a character who is completely different from everybody else on the soap, specifically noting Meena's "lack of empathy and her playfulness" as exciting points to portray. Brooks also spoke about the scenes, stating that up to that point, viewers and other characters on the soap had viewed Meena's behaviour as petulance, but hinted that the scenes of her murdering another character would reveal the "true extent of her narcissistic and amoral character". Brooks branded the character 'Malevolent Meena'.

When asked why Meena would kill someone, Sandhu explained that Meena feels it is "perfectly reasonable" to murder someone in her way so that she can achieve her goals. Fans immediately suspected that Meena would kill Leanna, accrediting Meena's motive to Leanna receiving a rucksack filled with suspicious items belonging to Meena. In the episode broadcast on 8 July 2021, Leanna discovers that Meena stole money from the gay pride collection in the village and tried to frame Jacob, as well as discovering that Meena murdered Nadine. Leanna tries to escape but is confronted by her on a bridge, which Meena throws her from. Slinger enjoyed filming her scenes with Sandhu, noting that her ability to play a psychopath was scarily good. The pair required a stunt coordinator since Leanna falls 40 feet from a bridge. Due to the impact of the COVID-19 pandemic on television, cast and crew members on Emmerdale were not allowed within 6 feet of each other at the time of filming. However, since Leanna and Meena had to be closer than 6 feet, the two actresses formed a bubble. This included isolating in a hotel for a number of days and taking regular COVID tests. Slinger was happy to have made the effort to bubble with Sandhu since it made the scenes "feel as real and raw as possible".

=== Andrea Tate's murder ===
Following Meena murdering Leanna, Meena acts as a support to McPherson's character Liam, who said that Liam finds solace in Meena's cold nature. McPherson also confirmed that Meena would kill again, stating: "Leanna will not be the last victim, that's for sure!" It was then confirmed that in October 2021, a "super soap week" for Emmerdale would air. The plot of the week was confirmed to revolve around an adventure survival challenge that would "set the stage for high-stakes scenes" and give Meena new targets. Brooks also hinted that the week sees Meena determined to kill Victoria due to her having a secret affair with David and confirmed that by the end of the week, a character would die. Regarding the production aspect of the "super soap week", Brooks explained that the idea of a survival week had been talked about for a while, but when the production team saw Meena's potential on screen, they decided to make the week centre around Meena. Brooks added: "Let's face it, when Meena is around, anything can happen. It's been knocking around for a couple of years, but it was only when Meena came to fruition that we thought this was the perfect backdrop for her to wreak havoc."

Victoria falls from a rope bridge into a body of water, where she plunges down a waterfall. Meena finds her at the bottom of the waterfall and holds her body into the water in an attempt to drown her. Andrea oversees her attempt to kill her, which Meena notices. She then leaves Victoria to survive and targets Andrea. She chases Andrea into a maze and the chase comes to a head when the two reach the centre. Andrea finds a flare gun and holds Meena at gunpoint, who follows her onto the stage and admits to Andrea that she killed Leanna and will now have do the same to her. When Andrea is distracted, Meena grabs the gun from her, but as she is doing it, Andrea lights the maze on fire. She pushes Andrea off the stage then slams her head against a wooden step and leaves her to die in the fire. Whilst Meena tries to get out, she collapses from the smoke, but is saved by Mackenzie. When asked if she saw anybody else inside the maze, she states that there is nobody inside, leaving Andrea to die. DS Rogers (Matthew Flynn) questions her on what she knows about Andrea's murder and Meena "hatches a plan to put someone else in the frame". Despite her plan, she later overhears villagers discussing the police finding a lack of evidence to suggest Andrea had been murdered, meaning the investigation had been dropped. The scenes show Meena "desperately trying to hide her smile".

=== Manipulating Billy Fletcher and Ben Tucker's murder ===
After Meena learns of David and Victoria's affair, she breaks into Victoria's house and destroys everything. Amy Wyatt (Natalie Ann Jamieson), who also lives there, immediately suspects Meena is responsible and confronts her, as well as informing the police. Billy sees their confrontation and intervenes before it can get physical; Meena labels Billy her "knight in shining armour" and starts a relationship with him to make David jealous. Billy still has romantic feelings for Dawn and the pair continue seeing each other, which Meena finds out about. Her reaction is to force Billy into allowing her to move in with him, which he reluctantly allows her to do. Hinting Meena's storylines for the end of 2021 in an interview with Inside Soap, Sandhu stated that the festive period is "intense" for her. Sandhu said that the storylines would be wilder than anything to date and that after reading the scripts for the Christmas episodes, she was surprised that they had managed to make her plot "10 times crazier than [she] could ever have imagined". Kate White, the conductor of her Inside Soap interview, wrote that Meena is "nowhere near done yet" in her time on Emmerdale.

Ben Tucker (Simon Lennon) is blamed for the adventure survival challenge going wrong and for Andrea's death, so he begins watching footage from the bodycams to prove his innocence. While on a date with Billy, Meena learns that he has access to the footage and leaves to visit him. She watches the footage with him and brags about how she almost murdered Victoria, after which he runs away from Meena. Meena hits him over the head with a kayak oar when he is not looking, and then when he is injured on the ground, she hits him again and kills him. The murder and Lennon's departure were not previously announced, meaning the scenes were a surprise for viewers.

After Ben's murder, Billy confesses to Meena that he wants to end their relationship to pursue Dawn instead. Sandhu said that his confession leads Meena to panic as she believes they are soulmates who are meant to be together. Therefore, to take ownership of the situation, Meena lies and tells Billy that she is pregnant with his baby. Sandhu explained that Meena does it as a way of "making sure that he can't cut her out of his life, and there's still a way of weaselling herself back in". Her reveal of the supposed pregnancy leads Billy to see the first signs of her "possessiveness and controlling behaviour", as well as putting difficulty in his plan of getting back with Dawn. Sandhu said that even she was shocked by the scripts and said: "there's nothing that's out of bounds for her because she doesn't feel guilty about doing anything and she doesn't believe that laws and bad things apply to her".

=== Kidnappings and escape ===
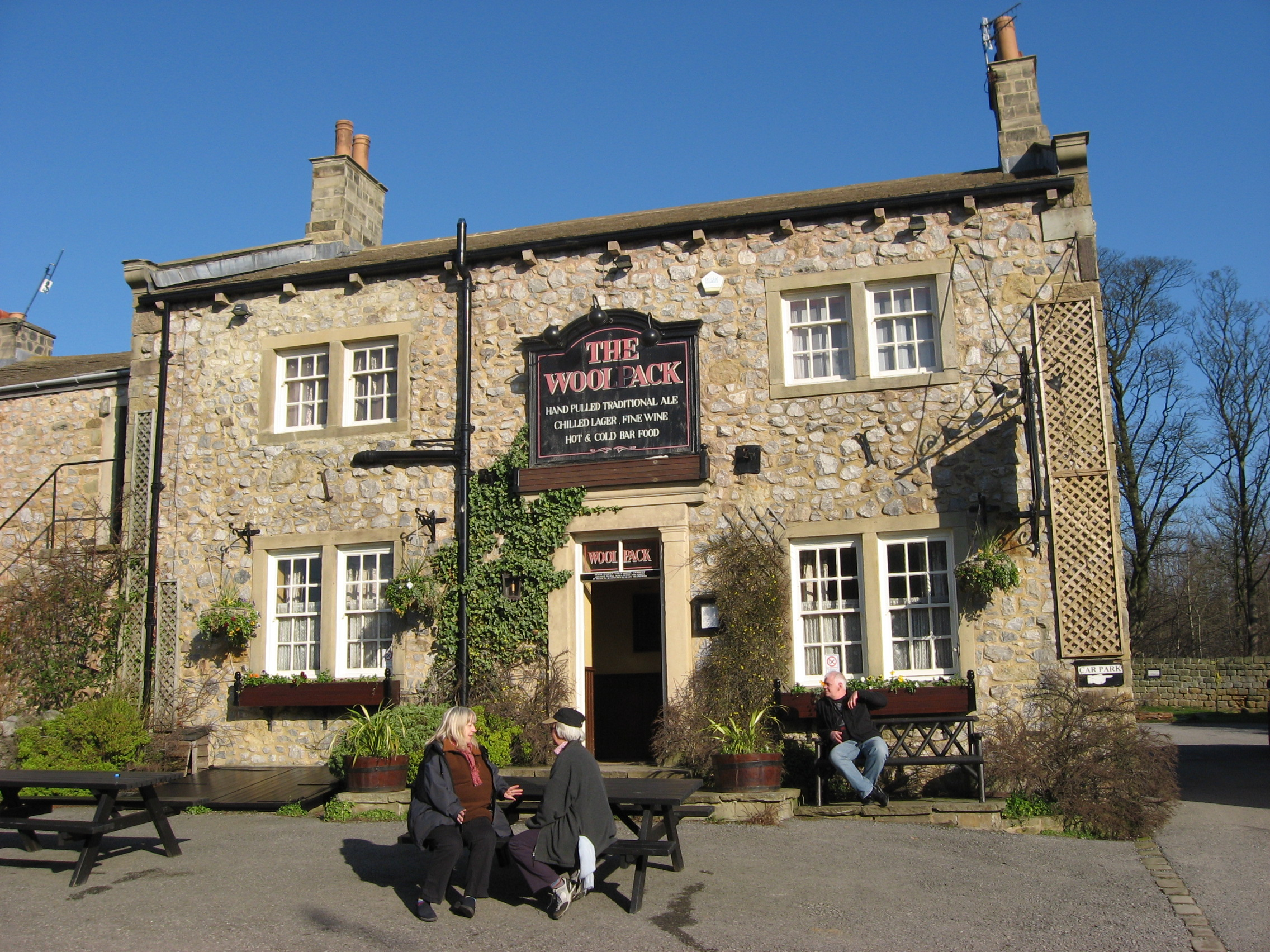
The Woolpack explodes whilst Meena tries to kill Manpreet outside.

Manpreet begins to suspect Meena of performing evil acts, so arranges to meet Carol Butler (Laura Pitt-Pulford), the sister of Nadine. Carol tells her that Meena came into Nadine's life as a great friend but later murdered her. Manpreet later overhears Meena on the phone to social services, alleging that Dawn has reformed a drug habit and should have her son taken away. Manpreet demands proof that Meena is pregnant, to which Meena breaks a glass bottle and tries to stab her outside the Woolpack. The building explodes, leaving the pair unconscious under the rubble from the explosion. It was confirmed that both sisters would survive the explosion, due to photos of Meena keeping Manpreet hostage having been released by producers prior to the scenes. Meena makes a second attempt to kill Manpreet in hospital, almost injecting her with poison, until she wakes up. Sandhu explained that Meena could not easily murder Manpreet due to their connection as sisters. She said that Meena would not think twice about murdering anyone else that discovers her secrets, but because it is Manpreet, it leads Meena to "choose a different tactic [which is] stressful for her".

Meena keeps Manpreet hostage in her bedroom and tells the other villagers that she has moved to Ibiza to recover from the explosion and stay with her daughter, Aiesha Richards (Shila Iqbal). She then fakes a miscarriage that she claims has been caused by the explosion and convinces Liam to prescribe her three weeks of diazepam, which she uses to drug Manpreet. While appearing on Loose Women, Sandhu said that due to Meena getting away with so many crimes in her time in the village, she is beginning to feel invincible. On the character's behaviour change, she said: "that's potentially her downfall as her behaviour is getting more and more outlandish and people are starting to catch on". It was then confirmed that Meena would set out to kill three people in a "bloodbath". The characters listed were Manpreet and Vinny Dingle (Bradley Johnson), who she kidnaps for knowing her secrets, as well as Samson Dingle (Sam Hall), who she sees with the ring that Meena stole from Leanna's dead body. However, after Liam interrupts her plan to kill Manpreet and Vinny, she goes on the run from the police with Tommy (Martin Mednikarov). The soap confirmed that her escape was not permanent and that her return to the soap would be imminent.

=== Returning for revenge on Billy and Dawn Fletcher's wedding ===
While on the run, Meena sees via social media that Billy and Dawn are set to get married on Valentine's Day. Inside Soap's Laura-Jayne Tyler wrote that her discovery could result in a "Valentine Day's massacre" due to her vow to "wreak havoc" on their wedding day and to get revenge on them both. Executive producer Jane Hudson told the magazine that while Meena's tenure on the soap was beginning to come to an end, there would still be numerous twists in the storyline since Meena "can do pretty much anything". She added that Meena's final actions on the soap would have "a lasting effect on quite a few of our villagers" but confirmed that Meena would get her comeuppance. On 7 February 2022, a trailer premiered on ITV with Meena in the village church, armed with a gun. Meena assaults a limousine driver and steals it to kidnap Dawn. Sandhu enjoyed the twist as she felt that Meena's return to the village was intense and that it was fun for her to play. After Meena kidnaps Dawn, she drives her to a local high bridge and opens the boot of the limo to reveal Billy is inside after drugging him. When Leyla Harding (Roxy Shahidi) attempts to locate the limo that had a tracker, Meena spots her coming and shoots her. Sandhu said that when filming for the scenes, it was very cold but due to the nice view from the viaduct and her company whilst filming, they were among her favourite scenes to film. She also enjoyed using a gun for the scenes as she felt that it added "an edge" to Meena that viewers had not previously seen.

When Dawn tries to beat Meena up, Meena informs her that she cannot kill her or else her son Lucas (Noah Ryan Aspinall) would die, indicating that she had kidnapped him. Whilst laughing maniacally, a scene then shows Harriet Finch (Katherine Dow Blyton) laying lifeless in a pool of her own blood after being wounded in the head by Meena. Dawn then rushes to the village to find Lucas, while Meena follows her to witness the chaos and to collect her box of items from her victims. Liam sees her and confronts her with a pitchfork. She makes a comment about how fun it was to murder Leanna and Liam pushes her from the bridge. On the possibility of Meena dying, Sandhu explained that Meena is not scared to die and that she would view it as a "great adventure", but in the case Meena survives and is sent to prison, Sandhu opined that her character would be fine with it as she sees Billy and Dawn living happily as worse than a prison sentence. Meena explains to the police that Liam deliberately pushed her from the bridge, but due to Manpreet and Liam sticking to the same story that it was self-defence and due to a lack of evidence, the investigation into Liam's attempted murder of Meena is dropped.

=== Court trial and departure ===
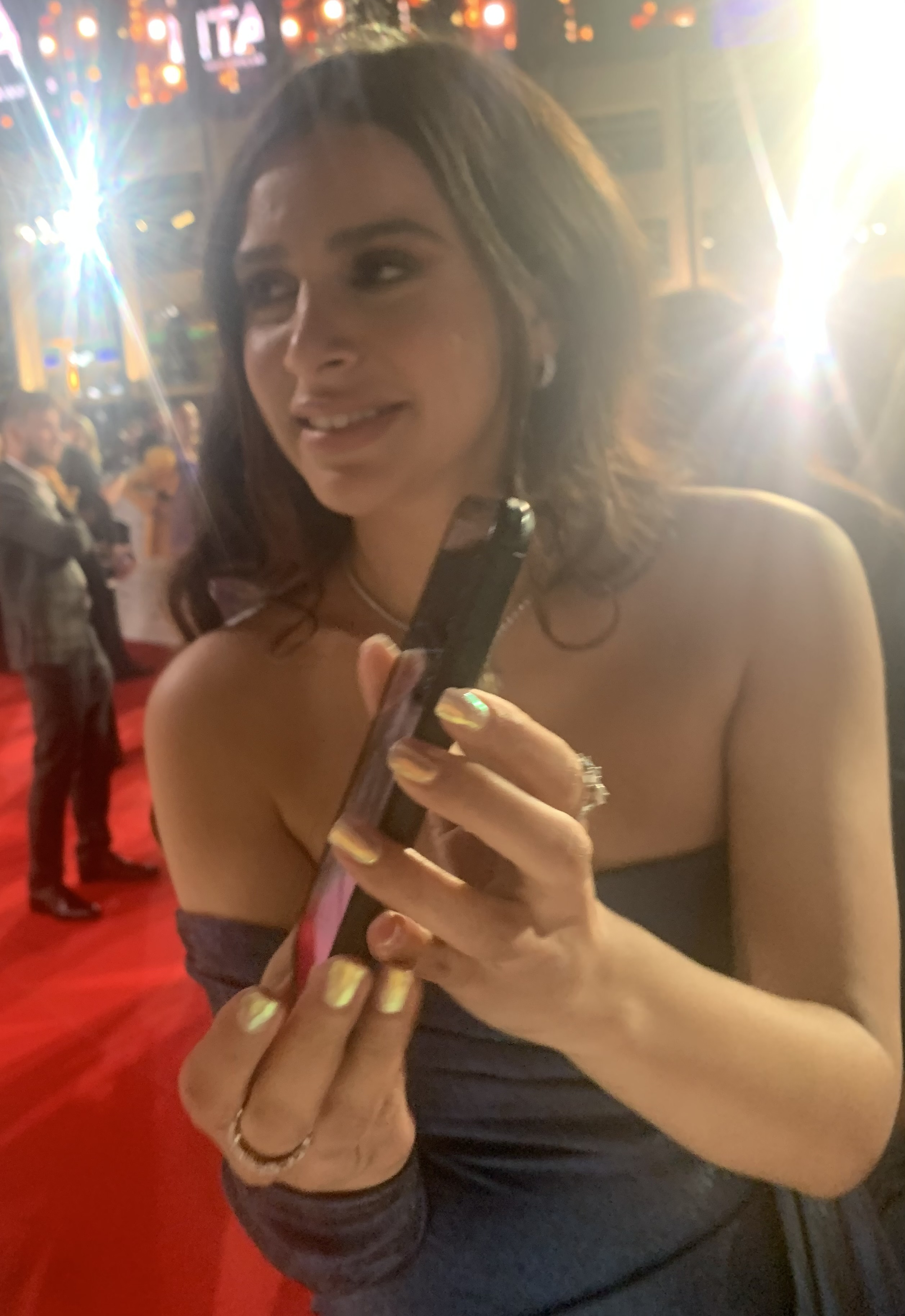
Sandhu cried when she read her final scripts.

In February 2022, Sandhu confirmed that she had commenced filming for Meena's final scenes. She told the Daily Mirror that the ending the writers had devised for Meena was better than she could have imagined and that it had made her cry. Whilst in custody, scenes see Meena manipulate Charles, who visits her regularly in an attempt to get her to confess her crimes in time for her hearing. One scene sees Meena break the fourth wall in an Emmerdale first, with her reciting bible verses to Charles. When it comes to her trial, Meena tries to fool the jury into believing that she was acting in self-defence when killing Ben, and that Leanna and Andrea's deaths are not connected to her. However, they decide that she is guilty for all three murders. After the verdict is announced, Meena has a meltdown, screaming at the jury and the judge. Carol points out that she killed her sister too and Meena responds by stating that Nadine was too irrelevant to even be mentioned, which leads to Carol stabbing Meena. Pretending to be injured so Manpreet will tend to her, she jumps up and takes both her and the courtroom hostage. Sandhu said that it was important for Meena to have "one last hurrah" in taking them hostage and enjoyed that viewers did not know what could happen. During the scenes, a fifth murder victim was revealed when she takes Manpreet aside and confesses she killed their own dying father before Manpreet could visit him at his deathbed.

Hinting at Meena's sentence, Sandhu said that the result is "worse than death" for Meena and that it would be satisfying for people who were not fans of the character. As she arrives at her sentencing, she is shocked to see that nobody is attending. She asks the court to wait until people have arrived and Sandhu said that Meena is "delusional" in the sense that she expects people to come, as well as only expecting to go to jail for a few years. Meena is sentenced to 75 years in prison for the three murders she committed, and despite her character "losing it", Sandhu was pleased with the conclusion for her character as she convinced herself that Meena would be killed off. In a goodbye message for Emmerdale's social media platforms, Sandhu said: "She's finally gone down. Who knew? I just want to say thank you all for all of your support. Thank you to everyone at Emmerdale and ITV and all my beautiful actors and the crew. You're all amazing — you've made this experience just the best of my life, and I will treasure these moments forever." She also thanked Sarker for the friendship they had formed whilst on the soap together. Brooks admitted that the production team were tempted on numerous occasions to keep Meena on the show instead of writing her out, but felt a responsibility to "give people a sense of justice". In October 2022, after receiving months of calls to return to the role as well as winning a Best Villain award, Sandhu confirmed that she had no plans to return. She was thankful for fans of the character to want more and did not rule out a return in the future, but felt that a return so soon would be "over-egging the story".

== Reception ==
=== Viewer response ===
Prior to her scenes airing, Sandhu felt that Meena would cause division between viewers of the soap. She admitted that if she was a viewer, she would dislike Meena, adding that many viewers were likely to be annoyed by her. Sandhu was correct in her presumptions, with What to Watch's Claire Crick writing that viewers were indeed divided on the character following her first appearance. Crick noted that Meena arrived "with a bang", and that viewers were either supporting Meena or Dawn in their rivalry. Some viewers were irritated by Meena, while others were enjoying her presence on the soap. After scenes of Meena locking Princess in a hot car aired, it prompted viewer complaints to the Royal Society for the Prevention of Cruelty to Animals. Viewers were angry over Meena's treatment of Princess, as well as Emmerdale for showing the scenes. When asked to comment, a spokesperson for the soap stated that Meena's actions were "extremely cruel" and hoped the scenes would act as a reminder to not lock dogs in cars, especially in warm weather.

Moments after killing Leanna, a scene of Meena dancing to "Toxic" by Britney Spears aired. The scene went viral on Twitter and Meena was branded a dame. Many viewers loved the scene, found it "iconic" and appreciated her "getting lit to "Toxic" by Britney after she killed a whole person". However, some viewers were "unnerved" by her behaviour. After Meena's murder of Leanna, Yasmine Yeung HITC noted that she has "left quite the impression on viewers". Leung noticed that fans of the soap had praised Sandhu for her portrayal of Meena and that they had become invested in the storyline due to her acting skills. Despite some viewers wanting Meena gone from the soap due to disagreeing with her actions, Leung herself admitted that she loves Meena and enjoys seeing her "psycho, unpredictable nature" as it incites drama on the soap.

Following Meena murdering Andrea, the Daily Mirror wrote that viewers were "traumatised and horrified by Meena’s vicious and violent treatment of Andrea" and that they found the scenes to be brutal and vicious. Similar attitudes were shown following her murder of Ben, with Ofcom reporting that 74 viewer complaints had been made about the violence shown in the scene of his murder. The Daily Mirror commentated on fan reaction once again in December 2021 when it was revealed that Meena would kidnap Manpreet. They found that viewers of the soap were divided on the twist, with some enjoying the drama and others wanting the storyline to end. As the kidnap storyline progressed, the divide continued, with some wanting Meena killed off and others being "onboard with the dark plot and psychotic Meena". Meena mentions that after killing Manpreet, she plans to kill Andrea's former dog Princess, which some viewers found to be "too far". Ofcom reported that another 63 complaints were made after the scenes of her kidnapping Manpreet and Vinny.

Despite viewer complaints, Meena's storyline proved to be popular when she was accredited with increasing Emmerdale's ratings to the point where it became the most watched soap opera in the United Kingdom. After her initial escape from the police, Calli Kitson of the Metro wrote that fans of the soap "are already missing singing, dancing, murdering Meena Jutla" and were demanding her back on the soap. She wrote that fans were paying tribute to Meena and that the soap would be boring without Meena and many viewers stated that Sandhu deserves a BAFTA Award for her role as Meena. Kitson also noted that since Meena trended on Twitter following each appearance, the character is a "definite job well done for Emmerdale". Charlotte Rodrigues found the same reaction with fans on Twitter, noting that many of them wanted her to return to kill Al Chapman (Michael Wildman). Sandhu also received messages on social media from fans who awaited her return, with many fans of the character nicknaming the soap 'Meenadale'.

After her return to the village for revenge on Billy and Dawn, the scenes attracted some criticism from viewers who felt that the premise of her return was unrealistic, feeling that she would have been noticed by villagers. However, other viewers were "thrilled" by the scenes and appreciated the dramatic nature of the scenes due to Emmerdale being a soap opera. Due to the violent scenes, Ofcom received 76 complaints. In the scenes where Liam is chasing Meena, the writers implemented some of the criticism from viewers into the script. Some viewers had expressed their annoyance with her victims poor attempts at running from her, and as a response, Emmerdale gave "a cheeky shout-out to fans who pointed out problems with Meena Jutla's murder scenes" by having Meena realise she had run in the wrong direction, leading to Liam being able to corner her. Following Liam pushing Meena from the bridge, viewers automatically did not believe that Meena had died. They felt that her sudden death would be too quick of an ending for her character due to her unpredictable ways and that there would be further twists to her storyline.

After Meena is imprisoned, viewers launched a petition for ITV to commission a spin-off series based around her due to her popularity online and offline. Sandhu agreed with the movement. With fans not "ready to say goodbye to her", they said that Meena had been the most interesting part of Emmerdale during her tenure and that a spin-off could explore her life in more brutal detail than a soap could. Some viewers were happy to see the conclusion of her time on Emmerdale as they felt that the storyline had lasted too long. However, a wide part of the audience felt that the show would not be the same without her. Fans of Meena, the 'Meeniacs', "mourned the loss" of the character and emotions ran high throughout the fanbase after her exit.

=== Critical response ===
When Meena confronts Leanna, Kitson (Metro) wrote that Meena is "evil and manipulative". Metro's David Brown opined that Meena could become a "top soap serial killer" and "could go down in the soap history books". Brown joked that there is no character "meaner than Meena" and voiced his excitement to see more of her villainous behaviour. Brown's colleague, Duncan Lindsay, listed Meena amongst various Emmerdale women that he felt were responsible for the soap being at "the top of its game". Lindsay opined that Meena was setting herself up to be "one of soap's all time memorable serial killers" due to her "chilling cold heartedness combined with that fantastic element of silliness". Sandhu received praise from the viewers for her part in Leanna's "chilling" murder, with them noting her "incredible acting skills as the deranged killer".

Lindsay (Metro) wrote another column on Meena, describing her as "the most unique and entertaining soap villain ever". He branded Meena a legend and stated that she has "broken the mould and the tropes of a murderer" due to taking pleasure and finding humour in her murdering spree. Lindsay compared Meena to Villainelle and commended her "own playlist of murder karaoke", a nod to her "Toxic" scene. In the past, Lindsay has advocated against soaps doing serial killer storylines due to overuse and unbelievability. However, he commended the soap for making Meena "unapologetically camp" and praised Sandhu for portraying Meena as "almost ludicrous, totally camp and with the funniest one liners". Lindsay concluded his column by stating that he roots for Meena to continue getting away with her crimes due to making Emmerdale more interesting. After Sandhu confirmed that she had begun filming her final scenes, Craig Jones from Leeds Live wrote that her time on Emmerdale would be remenbered for several years to come and felt that she had left a memorable legacy.

Media news website Entertainment Daily published an article in January 2022 after Sandhu confirmed her exit from the soap, pleading for the soap to keep Meena onscreen. They felt that Meena had excelled in comparison to Emmerdale's villains prior to her, writing that she could kill Lachlan White (Thomas Atkinson) "while painting her nails". They appreciated her culling nature and especially liked that she did not mess around when she wanted to kill someone. They also that felt that Emmerdale had "deadwood" in the cast and that having Meena kill them would be ideal for story progression. Following her exit scenes, Metro's Laura Denby wrote that across her tenure, Meena had achieved supervillain status. Denby added that due to her huge impact on the series, she had gone down as one of the best soap villains ever. Digital Spy's Kilkelly chose to write a piece analysing her time on the soap, in which he detailed what he thought worked and what did not. Kilkelly's strengths included liking that Meena is a camp femme fatale, which he felt was uncommon for soap villains. He noted that Meena's plot had added a sense of momentum for viewers when the other soaps were experiencing a dry spell caused by their "filler plots". Kilkelly also appreciated that Emmerdale had allowed for Sandhu to become a "breakout star", as he felt that the soap often prioritised the Dingle family. He wrote: "With ratings at their highest whenever Meena took centre stage over the past few months, it showed that not every story needs to be dominated by a Dingle." However, Kilkelly believed that Emmerdale should have known when to rest her story. He felt that Meena being brought onscreen at times was unnecessary and was caused by the "bosses clearly loving having Meena on screen" and opined that her not being shown for periods of time would add to the momentum of her story. He also thought that producers should have kept more details of Meena's murders out of spoiler articles so that viewers could have been more shocked about the scenes and wished that she had killed a big name such as Kim Tate (Claire King) or Cain Dingle (Jeff Hordley) for "a jaw-dropping moment". Kilkelly concluded his piece by admitting his hopes for Meena to return to the soap in future, when viewers least expect it.

=== Awards and nominations ===
In September 2021, it was announced that Sandhu had been nominated for Best Newcomer and Best Villain at the 2021 Inside Soap Awards. Meena murdering Leanna was also nominated for Best Show-Stopper. Sandhu went on to win the award for Best Villain. Meena also received a nomination for Best TV Character at the 2021 Asian Media Awards. In June 2022, Sandhu was awarded Best Leading Performer at the British Soap Awards. She was also nominated for Villain of the Year and Meena's murders were nominated for Best Storyline.

Sandhu then received a nomination for Best Soap Actor at the TRIC Awards, Serial Drama Performance at the 27th National Television Awards and Best Soap Actress at the TV Choice Awards. She also won the Best Villain at the 2022 Inside Soap Awards for a second consecutive year, as well as a nomination for Best Actress. Finally, Sandhu received a nomination for Favourite Soap Star at the TVTimes Awards. In 2023, over a year after her final appearance, Meena was included in Radio Times' Soap Champion battle, where she made the semi-finals.

== See also ==
- List of Emmerdale characters (2020)
- List of fictional nurses
- List of soap opera villains
