= Paige Sandhu =

English actress (born 1992)

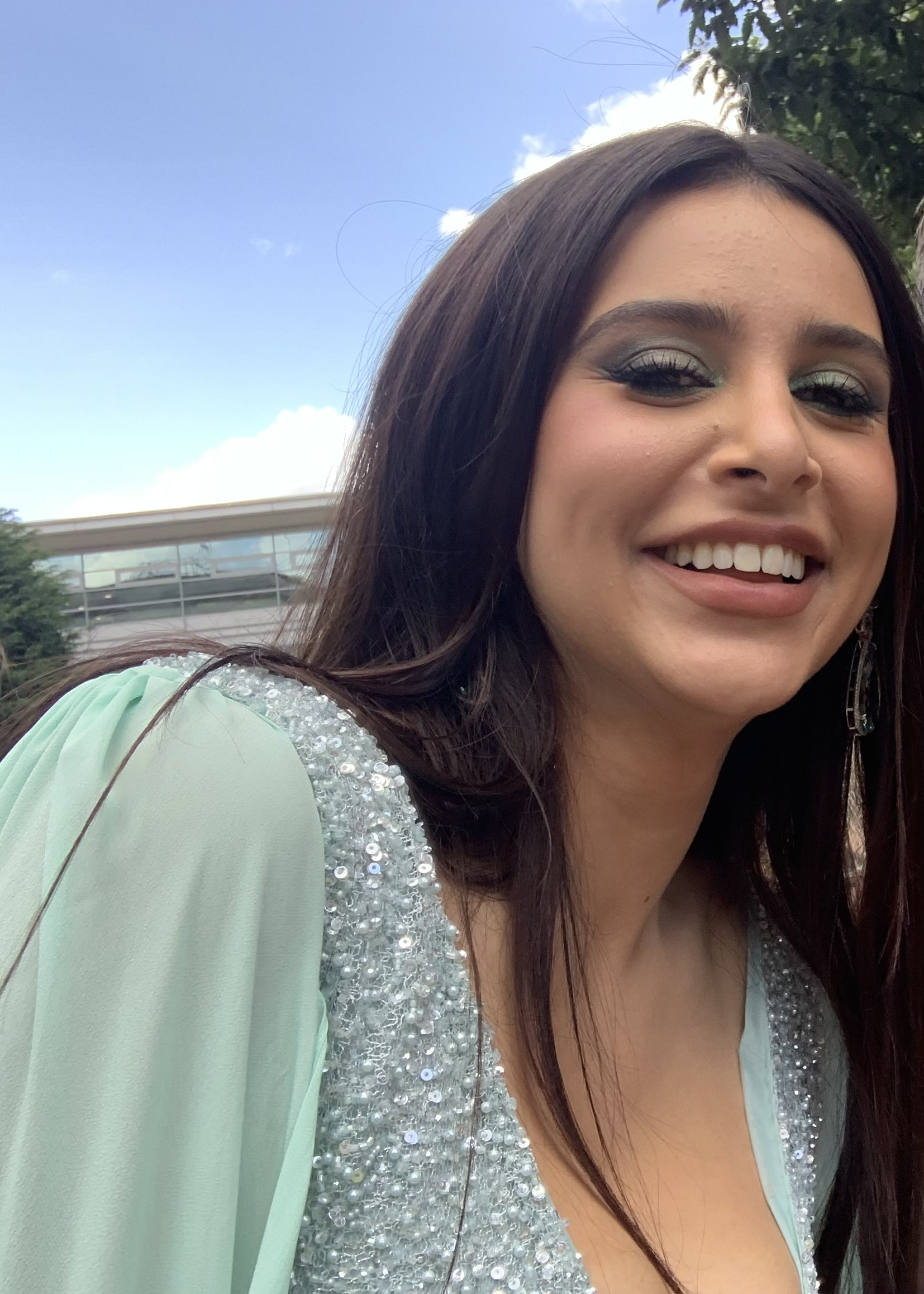
- Sandhu in 2022
- Born: Paige Courtney S. Sandhu; 28 October 1992 (age 33); Orpington, Bromley, England
- Education: Guildhall School of Music and Drama
- Occupation: Actress
- Agent(s): Williamson & Holmes
- Television: Emmerdale
- Awards: Full list

Paige Courtney S. Sandhu (born 28 October 1992) is an English actress. She began her career with appearances in Doctors and Endeavour, before being cast as Meena Jutla in the ITV soap opera Emmerdale (2020–2022). For her portrayal, she received critical acclaim, won Best Villain at the Inside Soap Awards two years in a row and won Best Leading Performer at the 2022 British Soap Awards.

== Early life ==
Paige Courtney S. Sandhu was born in Orpington, Greater London, on 28 October 1992 to an Indian father and English mother. Her father is a dentist and her mother is a Pilates instructor. Sandhu has three siblings. After attending the Guildhall School of Music and Drama, Sandhu suffered from social anxiety, fear of judgement and fears about her future career. She moved back in with her parents and "became quite reclusive". She felt unsafe around people she did not know which led her to not leave the house much, as well as developing insomnia and various food intolerances.

== Career ==
Sandhu made her debut in television appearances in the BBC soap opera Doctors and the ITV drama series Endeavour.

In September 2020, it was announced that Sandhu had been cast in the ITV soap opera Emmerdale as Meena Jutla, the sister of established character Manpreet Sharma (Rebecca Sarker). In June 2021, it was confirmed that Meena would become a serial killer on the soap. Sandhu received critical acclaim for her performances as Meena, and in 2021, she won the award for Best Villain at the Inside Soap Awards, and was nominated for Best Newcomer. In 2022, she was nominated for an award in the Soap Actor category at the TRIC Awards. Sandhu has confirmed that after the conclusion of Meena's serial killer arc, she will be leaving the soap. Her final scenes aired on 18 April 2022 when her character was sentenced to life in prison. In 2023, Sandhu was announced to be starring in the film Lioness. She was set to portray Princess Sophia, who was one of the key leaders of the suffragette movement in the UK. However, it was not taken to production.

== Filmography ==
Year	Title	Role	Notes	Ref.
Unknown	Doctors	Unknown	2 episodes	
2016	Endeavour	Cashier (uncredited)	Episode: "Arcadia"	
2020–2022	Emmerdale	Meena Jutla	Regular role	
2025	The Big Quiz	Herself	Cameo	

== Awards and nominations ==
Year	Ceremony	Award	Result	Ref.
2021	Inside Soap Awards	Best Newcomer	Nominated	
2021	Inside Soap Awards	Best Villain	Won	
2021	Asian Media Awards	Best TV Character	Nominated	
2022	The British Soap Awards	Best Leading Performer	Won	
2022	The British Soap Awards	Villain of the Year	Nominated	
2022	TRIC Awards	Best Soap Actor	Nominated	
2022	27th National Television Awards	Serial Drama Performance	Shortlisted	
2022	Inside Soap Awards	Best Actress	Nominated	
2022	Inside Soap Awards	Best Villain	Won	
2022	Asian Media Awards	Best TV Character	Nominated	
2022	TV Choice Awards	Best Soap Actress	Shortlisted	
2022	Digital Spy Reader Awards	Best Soap Actor (Female)	Third	
2022	TVTimes Awards	Favourite Soap Star	Nominated	
