= James Moore (actor) =

English actor (born 1992)

- Born: 15 August 1992 (age 33); Cheltenham, Gloucestershire, England
- Education: National Youth Theatre
- Occupation: Actor
- Television: Emmerdale
- Spouse: Sophie Edwards (m. 2024)

James Moore (born 15 August 1992) is an English actor. He has appeared in the ITV1 soap opera Emmerdale as Ryan Stocks since 2018, for which he was awarded the Newcomer accolade at the 24th National Television Awards, as well as being nominated for the British Soap Award for Best Newcomer.

== Early and personal life ==
Moore was born on 15 August 1992 in Cheltenham, Gloucestershire. He was born with ataxic cerebral palsy. On his disability, Moore said: "So firstly, I have cerebral palsy but it's ataxic CP, which basically means that I struggle with movement and co-ordination. I find it difficult to walk long distances and there are certain things I know I can't do, but I've adapted to these challenges in my day-to-day life." Throughout his teen years, Moore performed regularly at Cheltenham Playhouse.

Moore completed a degree in photography and trained in acting at the National Youth Theatre. In 2019, Moore began dating partner Sophie. Moore got engaged to her in May 2022, before marrying her in November 2024.

== Career ==
Moore has stated that he found it difficult to be cast in roles following university, accrediting the difficulty to his disability. He feared it would inhibit him from finding success in the acting industry, until he was cast in the ITV1 soap opera Emmerdale in 2018. He was cast in the regular role of Ryan Stocks, the long-lost son of established character Charity Dingle (Emma Atkins). The following year after his initial appearance, he was awarded the Newcomer accolade at the 24th National Television Awards, as well as being nominated for the British Soap Award for Best Newcomer.

== Filmography ==
Year	Title	Role	Notes
2018–present	Emmerdale	Ryan Stocks	Regular role
2020	Emmerdale Family Trees	Himself	1 episode
2020	Celebrity Chase	Himself	Contestant
2020	Celebrity Supply Teacher	Himself	Episode: "History"

== Awards and nominations ==
Year	Ceremony	Category	Nominated work	Result	Ref.
2019	National Television Awards	Newcomwer	Emmerdale	Won	
2019	British Soap Awards	Best Newcomer	Emmerdale	Nominated	
