= The Golden Hour (TV series) =

British television medical drama series

- Genre: Medical drama
- Created by: Andrew Rattenbury
- Directed by: Julian Holmes; Tim Leandro
- Starring: Richard Armitage; Navin Chowdhry; Zoe Telford; Ciarán McMenamin; Billy Geraghty; Pooky Quesnel; Rebecca Sarker
- Composer: Samuel Sim
- Country of origin: United Kingdom
- Original language: English
- No. of series: 1
- No. of episodes: 4

Production
- Executive producers: Dean Hargrove; Jonathan Young
- Producer: Mary McMurray
- Cinematography: Tom McDougal
- Editor: David Head
- Running time: 90 minutes
- Production company: Talkback Thames

Original release
- Network: ITV
- Release: 14 September – 5 October 2005

The Golden Hour is a four-part British television medical drama series, written and created by Andrew Rattenbury, first broadcast on 14 September 2005 on ITV. The series, which stars Richard Armitage, Navin Chowdhry, Zoe Telford and Ciarán McMenamin, centres on the activities of a specialist medical unit, the HEMS — or Helicopter Emergency Medical Service — which is based in London and operated by the London Ambulance Service. The title of the series refers to the hour which is deemed the most critical for patients with extensive injuries or severe medical conditions.

Notably, promotional trailers for the series carried the tagline, "You Have One Hour to Live... or Die." The series was one of four commissions, alongside Vincent, Afterlife and All About George, made by then-head of drama at ITV, Nick Elliott, in an attempt to attract a younger demographic. Prior to filming, the lead actors trained with the real HEMS team from the Royal London Hospital in Whitechapel; one of whom, Dr Gareth Davies, was a consultant for the series.

The first episode broadcast to a consolidated audience of 4.98 million viewers. Viewing figures remained between 4 and 5 million for the series run, but despite the consistent ratings, a second series was not commissioned by the network. The innovative structure of the programme was praised by critics, but the quality of the scripts was felt by many to have let the show down. The complete series was released on DVD on 30 July 2007.

== Cast ==
- Richard Armitage as Dr. Alec Track
- Navin Chowdhry as Dr. Naz Osborne
- Ciarán McMenamin as Dr. Paul Keane
- Zoe Telford as Dr. Jane Cameron
- Billy Geraghty as Kurt Jagger
- Pooky Quesnel as Dr. Christine Whelan
- Rebecca Sarker as Nina Osborne
- Francesca Fowler as Lilian Harris
- Chloe Howman as PC Rowena Banks

== Episodes ==
No.	Title	Directed by	Written by	British air date	UK viewers (million)
1	"Episode 1"	Tim Leandro	Andrew Rattenbury	14 September 2005	4.98
When youngster Drew Campbell (Jordan Bethall) unwittingly runs out in front of a bus whilst chasing his younger sister Jasmine (Lorna Fitzgerald), the driver, Euan Case (Ian Burfield) tries all he can to stop, but fails to do so, running the boy over and subsequently crashing into a parked vehicle, which overturns and kills pensioner Rita Philips (Anna Karen). Jane, Paul and Naz arrive at the scene and Paul has to make the decision whether or not to carry out a risky invasive procedure in an attempt to save Drew's life. Naz tries to fend off attention from the police who are determined to carry out a breathalyzer test on Euan, while Jane discovers marks on Jasmine's body to suspect she has been a victim of domestic abuse. Jane tries to keep Jasmine away from her mother, Una (Katy Cavanagh), unaware that her father, Nevin (Jason Done) is in fact the abuser.
2	"Episode 2"	Tim Leandro	Andrew Rattenbury	21 September 2005	4.51
A normal weekday afternoon in a sleepy town centre street takes an unexpected turn for the worse when an office block suddenly explodes, resulting in multiple casualties, including best friends Della (Julie Smith) and Cara (Charlie Brooks), single mother Rachel (Robin Weaver) and businessman Michael Cooper (Keith Barron). Paul attends to Rachel, and is concerned when she makes continued references to a baby, Chloe, who does not appear to be at the scene. As the condition of the office block deteriorates, Jane and Alec attend to Michael, who is trapped in the basement, and Jane makes the tough decision to risk her own life in an attempt to save him. Meanwhile, Della accuses Michael's assistant, Rick Peters (Bo Poraj) of causing the explosion, a suspicion that is replicated by his girlfriend, Erin (Ruth Bradley), who is also Michael's daughter.
3	"Episode 3"	Julian Holmes	Christopher Reason	28 September 2005	4.62
A speeding tanker smashes into a community centre, spilling its hazardous contents and preventing the team entering the building. As the minutes tick agonisingly by, they are forced to wait helplessly, desperate to treat the victims trapped inside. Naz deals with priest turned yoga student Patrick McGinley (Daniel Lapaine), who has suffered a severe double foot fracture, while Jane deals with receptionist Beth Stanley (Cathryn Bradshaw), who is suffering from severe breathing difficulties. Alec and Paul attempt treatment on tanker driver Jack Dean (Christopher Fulford) as the fire brigade try to free him from his cab, only to find his teenage daughter Cherry (Yasmin Paige) crushed in the footwell. As Alec fights to save Jack's life, Jack's boss, David (Ron Donachie) begins to panic that forensic investigation of the crash will reveal that the breaks on the tanker were faulty.
4	"Episode 4"	Julian Holmes	Andrew Rattenbury	5 October 2005	4.19
After picking up her daughter Grace from school, seven-month-pregnant Kate Murray (Emma Amos) and her new partner Graham (Bill Armstrong) travel to see a potential new family home when an argument escalates out of control and Graham loses control of their car, crashing into a number of parked vehicles. Having not been wearing a seatbelt at the point of impact, Kate is hurled through the windscreen onto the pavement below. Alec and Naz arrive at the scene, and Naz is forced to draw upon all of his knowledge of obstetrics to help Kate make it safely back to hospital. Meanwhile, Alec is called to a stabbing of barman Milan Bilic (Serge Soric) during a scuffle in a nearby pub, and discovers the two incidents may be connected. As Jane heads to help out barmaid Bev (Rebekah Staton), who was also injured in the scuffle, she finds herself being held at gunpoint.
