= Georgia Jay =

British actress

- Born: Georgina Phillips
- Occupation: Actress
- Years active: 2015–present
- Television: Emmerdale

Georgina Philipps, known professionally as Georgia Jay, is a British actress, known for portraying the role of Steph Miligan in the ITV soap opera Emmerdale since 2024. Prior to joining the soap, she appeared in various television series including Giri/Haji (2019) and Glow & Darkness (2021).

== Career ==
Jay made her television debut in the SyFy television film Lake Placid vs. Anaconda in 2015, later appearing in the 2018 film The Devil Sits on Both Shoulders in 2018. A year later, she appeared in the BBC Two crime drama series Giri/Haji. Then in 2021, she starred in the period drama Glow & Darkness.

In 2024, Jay was cast in the ITV1 soap opera Emmerdale. She was cast as Steph Miligan, the daughter of established characters Caleb (William Ash) and Ruby (Beth Cordingly). Her first appearance aired on 15 November 2024 and she has appeared as a regular cast member since. Her character's first major storyline on the soap sees it transpire that she is the daughter of incest, since Ruby was historically abused by her father as a child. In January 2025, Jay appeared in the BBC crime drama series Silent Witness as Camila. Later that year, she appeared in an episode of ITV's The Hack.

== Personal life ==
Jay has an identical twin sister, Emma, a reflexologist who lives in South Africa. Jay announced that she was pregnant in June 2025. She took a maternity leave break from Emmerdale starting in August.

== Filmography ==
Year	Title	Role	Notes
2015	NYC Rooftop Story	Susan	Film
2015	Lake Placid vs. Anaconda	Jennifer	Television film
2018	The Devil Sits on Both Shoulders	Georgina Vitis	Film
2019	Giri/Haji	Diane Vickers	Recurring role
2021	Glow & Darkness	Clare Favarone	Main role
2022	Charity	Phoebe	Short film
2024–2025	Emmerdale	Steph Miligan	Regular role
2025	Silent Witness	Camila	Guest role
2025	The Hack	Sienna Miller	Guest role
