= List of Emmerdale characters introduced in 2018 =

Emmerdale is a British soap opera first broadcast on 16 October 1972. The following is a list of characters that first appeared during 2018, by order of first appearance. Leanna Cavanagh (Mimi Slinger) and Maya Stepney (Louisa Clein) were introduced in March. Misty Allbright (Hedydd Dylan) and Dawn Taylor (Olivia Bromley) were introduced in April. Terry (Daniel Casey) made his first appearance in May, while Ryan Stocks (James Moore) made his debut in June. Manpreet Jutla (Rebecca Sarker) and her daughter, Aiesha Richards (Shila Iqbal) arrive in July. Ellis Chapman (Asan N'Jie and Aaron Anthony) and Obadiah Dingle (Paul Copley) arrived during September. Billy Fletcher (Jay Kontzle) was introduced in December. Additionally, multiple other characters appeared in 2018.

== Leanna Cavanagh ==
Leanna Cavanagh, played by Mimi Slinger, made her first appearance on 6 March 2018. She is introduced following the decision to promote her father Liam (Jonny McPherson) to a regular character, where producers explored his family life. She feuds with stepmother Maya Stepney (Louisa Clein), as well as his later partners Bernice Blackstock (Samantha Giles) and Leyla Harding (Roxy Shahidi). She develops an on-off relationship with Jacob Gallagher (Joe-Warren Plant), as well as making a frenemy out of Bernice's daughter Gabby Thomas (Rosie Bentham).

Actress Slinger stated that the "proudest moment" of her life was the day that her mother called her to inform her that she had landed the role of Leanna. In an interview with Susannah Alexander of Digital Spy, Slinger described Leanna as a troublemaker, and that she loves the attention that comes from being that way. She stated that Leanna is "that stereotypical mean girl who creates drama to keep her position". Slinger explained to Alexander that Leanna has a "hard exterior" due to events in her backstory, which causes her to be too harsh to people and not regard their feelings. The backstory of Leanna involves her mother Lara's death, which led her to not have a mother figure throughout her formative years. Viewers have "slammed" Leanna for her actions, describing her as "horrible" and a "devil child", as well as being branded "evil", "vile" and a "horrible little bitch".

== Maya Stepney ==
Maya Stepney
- Emmerdale character
- Portrayed by: Louisa Clein
- Duration: 2018–2019
- First appearance: Episode 8089; 8 March 2018
- Last appearance: Episode 8651; 19 November 2019
In-universe information
- Occupation: Teacher
- Mother: Barbara Stepney
- Husband: Liam Cavanagh (until 2019)
- Sons: Theo Metcalfe
- Stepdaughters: Leanna Cavanagh (until 2019)

Maya Stepney, played by Louisa Clein, made her first appearance on 8 March 2018. She was introduced as the wife of Dr Liam Cavanagh. She later begins a relationship with David Metcalfe (Matthew Wolfenden) and begins to groom his son, Jacob Gallagher (Joe-Warren Plant).

Maya attends a dinner hosted by David and his wife Tracy Metcalfe (Amy Walsh), along with her husband Dr Liam Cavanagh (Jonny McPherson) and stepdaughter Leanna (Mimi Slinger). She and Dr. Cavanagh later split up, and she begins dating David, shortly after Tracy leaves him. She becomes close to his son, Jacob Gallagher (Joe-Warren Plant) and begins to groom him, later sleeping with him in February 2019, after his sixteenth birthday. Their love affair is exposed to Liv Flaherty (Isobel Steele) when she walks in on Jacob and Maya having sex. Liv later demands £5,000 from Maya or their affair is exposed. Maya tries to convince Liv that blackmailing her would send Liv to prison, which makes Liv angry and tells Maya that she now needs £10,000. While on a night out with Leyla Harding (Roxy Shahidi) and Priya Sharma (Fiona Wade), David and Tracy, David kisses Tracy, Maya gets upset and leaves the club to meet Jacob. Priya goes out to find her purse but on her way she finds Maya and Jacob kissing. She later tells Leyla and Tracy. Leyla, Tracy and Priya kidnap Maya, and the following morning it is revealed that they badly injured Maya and left her for dead in the woods. Later that day, they go back to the place where they assumed they left Maya, but they only find bits of her blood-stained clothing. Leyla, Priya and Tracy later burn all the evidence, as they think that Maya's body might have floated off in the river near the woods. Liv later catches them and confesses to Leyla that she knew about Maya and Jacob, leaving Leyla repulsed.

On 20 June 2019, Maya is sentenced to 12 months' imprisonment for her inappropriate relationship with Jacob. However, she is released on 19 November and it is revealed that she is pregnant. In December 2019, she gives birth, abandons the baby on David's doorstep and flees abroad.

== Misty Allbright ==
Misty Allbright
- Emmerdale character
- Portrayed by: Hedydd Dylan
- First appearance: Episode 8117; 9 April 2018
- Last appearance: Episode 8241; 28 August 2018
In-universe information
- Occupation: Sex therapist

Misty Allbright, played by Hedydd Dylan, made her first appearance on 9 April 2018. The character was introduced as Rodney Blackstock's (Patrick Mower) new love interest. Misty is a sex therapist, who meets Rodney in Ibiza and returns to the village with him. On Misty's presence, actor Nick Miles, who plays Rodney's son-in-law Jimmy King, said "It's a living hell and only adds pressure to Jimmy's lack of bedroom performance. The fact the writers have named her after my dog has added to the idea that this is my nightmare." The character departed on 24 August 2018. Dylan said she enjoyed her time on the show, and would return to Emmerdale if she was asked.

Misty's pairing with Rodney was nominated for "Most Bizarre Soap Storyline" at the 2018 Digital Spy Reader Awards; it came in eighth place with 6% of the total votes.

Misty follows her new boyfriend Rodney Blackstock to Emmerdale. Rodney introduces Misty to his daughters Bernice Blackstock (Samantha Giles) and Nicola King (Nicola Wheeler), after they hear them having sex. Nicola confides in Misty about her husband Jimmy King's intimacy problems, and Misty tells her she and Rodney will look after their children for the night. Misty later offers Jimmy her services as a sex therapist and he accepts. Nicola learns that Jimmy was not completely clothed during the session and worries that Misty and Jimmy had sex. Misty explains that Jimmy initially thought that she was going to give him a massage, but she got him to relax and embrace his spirit animal. Misty offers to arrange Brenda Walker's (Lesley Dunlop) hen-do and Brenda agrees, even though they have different tastes. Misty performs a cleansing ritual at the hen-do, and the other women decide to go to The Woolpack. Paddy Kirk (Dominic Brunt) worries that he is cursed, so Misty performs a cleanse at the pub. She charges Paddy £125, but he gives her £5 and Misty tells him to enjoy his karma.

== Dawn Fletcher ==
Dawn Fletcher
- Emmerdale character
- Portrayed by: Olivia Bromley
- Duration: 2018–2026
- First appearance: Episode 8132; 25 April 2018
- Last appearance: Episode 10647; 30 August 2026
In-universe information
- Other names: Dawn Taylor
- Occupation: Prostitute; Sweet packer; Personal assistant; Receptionist
- Father: Will Taylor
- Mother: Rose Jackson
- Stepmother: Kim Tate
- Husband: Billy Fletcher (2022–2026)
- Sons: Lucas Taylor; Evan Fletcher
- Adoptive daughters: Clemmie Reed (ward)

Dawn Fletcher (also Taylor), played by Olivia Bromley, made her first appearance on 25 April 2018. The character was introduced as part of Ross Barton's (Michael Parr) revenge storyline against Simon McManus (Liam Ainsworth), who threw acid in his face. Following her first appearance, a writer for Inside Soap noted in the 5–11 May 2018 issue of the magazine, "Emmerdale fans thought they spotted a spark between Dawn and Ross when he took pity on the drug user's plight and helped her out last week." The writer also reported that Bromley would soon be returning to the show. Her management confirmed that she would be a regular cast member. It was announced in March 2026 that Bromley's contract with the soap had not been renewed, with Dawn set to be written out later in the year. Bromley's final scenes aired on 30 August 2026 when her character was killed off after giving birth.

Ross Barton grabs Dawn when she returns to Simon McManus' flat. Dawn tells Ross that she does not know Simon and asks him to leave, but when Ross pours her cocaine down the sink, Dawn admits she does know Simon and that her friend Lee was supposed to be a witness at his trail, but he overdosed. Ross notices a basket of children's toys and Dawn reveals that she has a son, but he was taken into care. Ross gives Dawn a bottle of pills and his phone number. When her pimp Connor (Cameron Jack) returns, he finds Dawn has taken the pills. She gives him Ross's number and tells him Ross lives in Emmerdale. Ross later meets with a bruised Dawn, who is looking for some drugs. Ross encourages her to go and see a doctor, but later gives her £100. His brother Pete Barton (Anthony Quinlan) walks in on them and later warns Dawn to stay away from Ross.

A couple of weeks later, Dawn returns to the village and admits that she is working for Connor again. Ross asks her to call Connor and persuade him to come over. Ross punches Connor after Connor encourages him to, and Dawn pulls Ross off of him. Dawn later hands over a package containing drugs to Ross for him to sell on Connor's behalf. The following day, Ross asks for Dawn's help in persuading Connor to meet with him. Dawn warns Ross that Connor is dangerous and Ross shows a gun. After his meeting with Connor, Dawn asks Ross what happened and he reveals he did not use the gun. Dawn later comes to Ross to ask if he has seen Connor, as he is missing. She bonds with Ryan Stocks (James Moore) and tells him that as she is clean, she has had contact with her son. Ross tells Dawn to forget about Connor, and they have sex. But when he remarks that he has not got enough money to pay her, Dawn leaves. She returns to tell Ross that Simon is in the village and is planning on carrying out a raid at Home Farm. A few weeks later, Dawn lets herself into Dale View, where she is confronted by Rhona Goskirk (Zoe Henry).

In 2021, Laura-Jayne Tyler from Inside Soap praised the character, writing, "We really, really like Emmerdale's Dawn now. We night not have known it at the height of all the Malone nonsense, but his murder cover-up has been the absolute making of her. And we're really rooting for Dawn and Jamie. Their chemistry is proper Romeo & Juliet, true-love-thwarted-at-every-turn stuff...Plus, he's much less of a complete and utter tool when she's around."

== Terry ==
Terry
- Emmerdale character
- Portrayed by: Daniel Casey
- First appearance: Episode 8158; 24 May 2018
- Last appearance: Episode 8202; 13 July 2018
In-universe information
- Other names: Paul Tozer (real name)
- Occupation: Con-artist

Terry, played by Daniel Casey, made his first appearance on 24 May 2018. Casey is one of a few actors to have made appearances in the three British soap operas Emmerdale, Coronation Street and EastEnders. Terry was introduced as the uncle of deceased character Gerry Roberts (Shaun Thomas).

Terry is in The Woolpack when he overhears Aaron Dingle (Danny Miller) telling Doug Potts (Duncan Preston) that if Gerry Roberts was still around, he would be telling Aaron to cut Doug some slack. Terry throws his pint over Doug and calls him a murderer. He then reveals that he is Gerry's uncle. Doug does not argue with Terry when he says Doug should be in prison for causing his nephew's death. Doug apologises and offers to help with the funeral costs. When Terry learns that Doug is likely to receive community service, he tells Doug that he will be suing him and the B&B, where Gerry's death took place.

Terry returns to help organise Gerry's funeral and gives Doug a letter from his solicitor. Gerry's friend Lachlan White (Thomas Atkinson) asks Terry if he can have Gerry's sketchpad, but Terry refuses to give it to him. During Gerry's funeral, Terry leaves the church claiming that he is upset, before robbing the B&B and fleeing. The police arrest a Terry Roberts, but Doug and Diane Sugden (Elizabeth Estensen) learn that he is not the conman, as his identity was stolen. Lachlan finds the conman, whose real name is revealed to be Paul Tozer, at another funeral, and follows him in his car, killing him off-screen through unknown means and burying the corpse in the woods. Lachlan later returns home with blood on his shirt. Weeks later, the police find Paul's DNA in the woods. Lachlan digs up Paul's body and puts it in the boot of his car. However, Sam Dingle (James Hooton) sees the corpse, leading to Lachlan attacking him.

== Ryan Stocks ==
Ryan Stocks
- Emmerdale character
- Portrayed by: James Moore
- Duration: 2018–present
- First appearance: Episode 8167; 5 June 2018
In-universe information
- Occupation: Website builder Pub landlord
- Father: Mark Bails
- Mother: Charity Dingle
- Adoptive mother: Irene Stocks
- Brothers: Josh Stocks (adoptive)
- Half-brothers: Noah Dingle; Moses Dingle; Luke Bails
- Half-sisters: Debbie Dingle; Molly Bails; Leyla Sugden
- Sons: Oscar Grisham
- Nephews: Jack Sugden
- Nieces: Sarah Sugden
- Other relatives: Zak Dingle; Cain Dingle; Chas Dingle; Marlon Dingle; Sam Dingle; Belle Dingle; Mandy Dingle; Aaron Dingle

Ryan Stocks, played by James Moore, made his first appearance on 5 June 2018. The character and Moore's casting was announced on 30 May 2018. Of his casting, the actor commented "I'm so excited to have joined the Emmerdale cast. Everyone is so welcoming and friendly and I'm having a great time playing Ryan. I leapt a mile when I got the call and I was over the moon to hear that I had got the part." Ryan is Charity Dingle's (Emma Atkins) long-lost son, whom she had thought to be dead. In a special flashback episode that aired on 29 May 2018, viewers learned that her son had actually survived birth. Justin Harp of Digital Spy reported that Charity would meet her son imminently, as he comes to the village to see her. Ryan has ataxic cerebral palsy and tells Charity that he is not "defined by his disability." Acting series producer Kate Brooks described Ryan as being "feisty, funny and reckless, and with an unquenchable zest for life." Brooks also said the character will "turn Charity's life upside down" as he meets his new family. For his portrayal of Ryan, Moore was nominated for Best Soap Newcomer at the 2018 Digital Spy Reader Awards; he came in second place with 15.7% of the total votes. The following year, Moore received his first National Television Awards nomination in the Newcomer category for his portrayal of Ryan, and later went on to win the award.

After reporting DI Mark Bails (Rocky Marshall) for sexually abusing her when she was fourteen, Charity Dingle reveals that she conceived and gave birth to a son, who she believes died shortly after birth. However, she soon learns that the baby survived and was adopted by midwife Irene Stocks. Charity and Ryan eventually meet. Charity leaves Ryan a voicemail telling him to get lost, which deeply hurts everybody involved, but, after a period of negotiating with Irene, Charity puts it right, and eventually introduces Ryan to the Dingle family, who welcome him with open arms. Charity's son Noah Dingle (Jack Downham) refuses to get to know him, and he accuses Charity of replacing him and moves into Home Farm with Joe Tate (Ned Porteous). When Ryan meets his biological father, Bails makes it clear that Ryan does not mean anything to him, which leads to Ryan getting arrested and spending a night in police custody after hitting Bails with a plank of wood. Upon release, he and Noah resolve their differences and both attend Bails' trial, watching him get sent to prison. Ryan befriends Ross Barton (Michael Parr) in The Woolpack, and tries to help him beat his cocaine addiction. Ryan saves Ross's life after he almost dies from a heart attack, while playing football with his and Charity's son Moses Dingle (Arthur Cockroft).

== Manpreet Sharma ==
Manpreet Sharma
- Emmerdale character
- Portrayed by: Rebecca Sarker
- Duration: 2018–present
- First appearance: Episode 8197; 9 July 2018
In-universe information
- Other names: Manpreet Jutla; Saira
- Occupation: Doctor
- Sisters: Meena Jutla
- Husband: Dennis (backstory); Rishi Sharma (2019–2022)
- Daughters: Aiesha Richards
- Stepsons: Nikhil Sharma; Jai Sharma (adoptive)
- Stepdaughters: Priya Sharma

Manpreet Sharma (also Jutla), played by Rebecca Sarker, made her first appearance on 9 July 2018. She is introduced as a love interest and later wife for Rishi Sharma (Bhasker Patel). Manpreet is a locum doctor, who covers for Liam Cavanagh (Jonny McPherson). Rishi Sharma (Bhasker Patel) visits the surgery for a health check, and is immediately attracted to her. They talk about their families, and keen to impress Manpreet, Rishi arranges for her daughter Aiesha Richards (Shila Iqbal) to go on a date with his son, Jai Sharma (Chris Bisson). Manpreet examines a mole on Lydia Hart's (Karen Blick) ankle and believes that it could be melanoma. Manpreet and her daughter go on a double date with Rishi and Jai, which ends with Manpreet comforting Aiesha when Jai admits that he does not want to date her. He later tells Manpreet to give his father a chance as he likes her, and she asks Rishi out. Rishi and Manpreet's lunch date goes well until her former boyfriend interrupts. He states that Manpreet's car is his and Rishi offers to buy her a new one, which makes her realise that he is more invested in their relationship then she is. Jai tries talking to her about his father's ways. She later tells Rishi that she wants to take things more slowly, after he calls her and sends her flowers. Jai later discovers she has a shopping addiction and tries to dissuade her from carrying on with Rishi. She later steals £1000 from the factory and Rishi discovers her addiction but he forgives her. They later get married in Las Vegas, much to Jai's distaste. Manpreet gets a permanent job at the doctors surgery, and promises Jai that she will stop online shopping.

Manpreet's previously unmentioned sister Meena Jutla (Paige Sandhu) arrives in the village, and it is explained that before their arrivals in the village, Meena slept with Manpreet's first husband Dennis, which caused the marriage to break down. When father and son Charles (Kevin Mathurin) and Ethan Anderson (Emile John) arrive in the village, it is revealed Manpreet had a two-year relationship with Charles under a fake name while she was estranged from her first husband. Manpreet fled her and Charles' wedding, as she would have been committing bigamy if she had gone ahead with the ceremony, and allowed the Andersons to believe she was dead.

Actress Sarker stated that her character "has lots of layers", and responded to fan theories of Manpreet being a future villain by stating that she has "a little bit of a dark side". She added that Manpreet "has a screw loose", as well as "shifty eyes". Following the introduction of Manpreet's sister Meena, Sarker joked that "Meena's return is about as welcome as a fart in a spacesuit" for Manpreet. She commented on the pair having "unresolved conflict" due to Manpreet feeling that she has been "wronged" by her sister. On working with actress Sandhu, she stated that the pair got on from the first screen test, and that her arrival has helped to expand their "lovely little family unit". After the "bombshell" about her connection to the Anderson family, Sarker hoped that "the viewers will empathise with her", and stated that there is an explanation for her behaviour without excusing it. She joked that her character did not go on Ashley Madison, but that it happened due to her feelings.

== Aiesha Richards ==
Aiesha Richards
- Emmerdale character
- Portrayed by: Shila Iqbal
- Duration: 2018–2019
- First appearance: Episode 8198; 10 July 2018
- Last appearance: Episode 8456; 24 April 2019
In-universe information
- Father: Dennis
- Mother: Manpreet Sharma
- Stepfather: Rishi Sharma
- Aunts: Meena Jutla

Aiesha Richards, played by Shila Iqbal, made her first appearance on 10 July 2018 for a guest stint. She is introduced as the daughter of Manpreet Jutla (Rebecca Sarker) and potential love interest for Jai Sharma (Chris Bisson). She is reintroduced as a regular character in March 2019. On 11 April 2019, it was announced that Iqbal had been dismissed due to offensive historical social media posts. She last appeared on 24 April of that year.

Manpreet and Rishi Sharma (Bhasker Patel) set Aiesha up on a date with Rishi's son, Jai Sharma (Chris Bisson). Jai does not want to go the date and attempts to leave, until he sees Aiesha. They get along well, but Jai dislikes Aiesha's laugh and is reluctant to accept another date. However, he and Rishi agree to a double date with Aiesha and Manpreet. Jai later informs Aiesha that he does not want a relationship with her. In August 2021, Aiesha crashes her moped in Ibiza. Manpreet and Meena (Paige Sandhu) go to see her in hospital, where she is put into an induced Coma.

== Ellis Chapman ==
Ellis Chapman
- Emmerdale character
- Portrayed by: Asan N'Jie (2018–2019); Aaron Anthony (2019–2022)
- Duration: 2018–2022
- First appearance: Episode 8249; 4 September 2018
- Last appearance: Episode 9282; 9 February 2022
In-universe information
- Occupation: Labourer; Personal trainer
- Father: Al Chapman
- Mother: Jessie Grant
- Stepfather: Marlon Dingle
- Half-brothers: Billy Fletcher

Ellis Chapman, played by Asan N'Jie and Aaron Anthony, made his first appearance on 4 September 2018. N'Jie's casting was revealed in the 1–7 September 2018 issue of Inside Soap. Ellis is Jessie Grant's (Sandra Marvin) son. N'Jie explained that Ellis has recently finished university, and he wants to tell his mother that he no longer wants to train as a teacher. The actor described his character as "a cheeky chap" and "a Jack-the-lad", who occasionally gets himself into trouble. N'Jie thought he and Ellis were similar, but he was more grounded. Ellis is introduced as a potential love interest for Victoria Barton (Isabel Hodgins), as he comes to the village for a date with her. Ellis also learns that his mother is dating Marlon Dingle (Mark Charnock) N'Jie also confirmed that Ellis and Jessie are hiding a secret from Marlon.; this secret is that Jessie's other son, and Ellis' brother, Billy, is in prison for a dangerous crime that, according to Jessie, he did not commit. This has driven a wedge between Ellis and Jessie and has also driven a wedge between Jessie and Marlon.

On 11 September 2019, N'Jie was fired from Emmerdale due to threatening behaviour towards Hollyoaks actor Jamie Lomas at the 2019 TV Choice Awards where N'Jie was nominated for Best Soap Newcomer. His final scenes aired in the episode broadcast on 17 October 2019 with the character heading to Dubai. It was announced on 8 November 2019 that the character had been recast by soap bosses and he would now be played by Aaron Anthony. Anthony made his first appearance in the role on 12 December 2019. In 2021, it was reported that Anthony had quit the soap following the outcome of a "race row". Isobel Hodgins and Matthew Wolfenden, Anthony's co-stars, were accused of mocking the accent of a mixed race actress, as well as making an "inappropriate comment". Emmerdale later confirmed that the reports of Anthony quitting the soap were true and his final scenes aired on 9 February 2022.

== Obadiah Dingle ==
Obadiah Dingle
- Emmerdale character
- Portrayed by: Paul Copley
- Appears in: Episode 8269; 26 September 2018
In-universe information
- Father: Bert Dingle
- Mother: Jessie Dingle
- Brothers: Solomon Dingle; Elvis Dingle
- Wife: Kathleen Dingle
- Daughters: Charity Dingle
- Grandsons: Ryan Stocks; Noah Dingle; Moses Dingle; Oscar Grisham
- Granddaughters: Debbie Dingle
- Uncles: Jedediah Dingle
- First cousins: Zak Dingle; Shadrach Dingle; Albert Dingle
- Other relatives: Sarah Sugden; Jack Sugden

Obadiah Dingle, played by Paul Copley, appeared on 26 September 2018. Copley's casting was announced on 18 September 2018. His character had not been seen before, but he has been mentioned by his on-screen family. Copley made a one-off appearance. Obadiah is the estranged father of Charity Dingle (Emma Atkins) and Zak Dingle's (Steve Halliwell) cousin. Charity tracks down her father, as she attempts to "rebuild her life" following the imprisonment of her rapist Mark Bails (Rocky Marshall). Charity grows angry at her family, who did not help her when Obadiah threw her out of their home when she was a young teenager.

== Clive ==
Clive, played by Tom Chambers, made his first appearance in October 2018. The character and Chambers' casting details were announced on 14 October 2018. Clive is Leyla Harding's (Roxy Shahidi) fiancé.

Clive was a client of Leyla's whilst in Mykonos, hiring her with his former fiancée, Suzie, until they split and Clive went with Leyla. After Suzie arrives in the village and reveals that Clive and Leyla had stolen jewellery that purportedly belonged to Suzie's grandmother, with the intention of selling it, Leyla seeks to break it off with Clive, who was in Dubai on business, but he appears in the village, in order to make amends with Leyla. Leyla tried to throw him out, but soon they both give into desire and rekindle their relationship. Frank reveals that he and Clive once shared a cell together when they were both in prison, and that Frank taught Clive the art of conning people. Frank threatens to reveal Clive's past if he ever breaks Leyla's heart. Clive convinces Frank to run an art con with him, and Leyla becomes involved after finding out about their plans. Leyla finds out that Clive plans for them to double cross Frank, leaving him to take the blame for the con while taking the money for himself and Leyla and fleeing the country. Upon realising this, Leyla has second thoughts about betraying Frank and leaving Emmerdale, and ultimately tricks Clive into getting out of the car and drives back to the village without him.

== Billy Fletcher ==
Billy Fletcher
- Emmerdale character
- Portrayed by: Jay Kontzle
- Duration: 2018–present
- First appearance: Episode 8347/8348; 25 December 2018
In-universe information
- Occupation: Delivery Driver; Personal Trainer
- Father: Evan Fletcher Sr
- Mother: Jessie Grant
- Stepfather: Al Chapman; Marlon Dingle
- Half-brothers: Ellis Chapman
- Wife: Dawn Taylor (2022–2026)
- Sons: Evan Fletcher
- Adoptive sons: Lucas Taylor
- Adoptive daughters: Clemmie Reed (ward)

Billy Fletcher, played by Jay Kontzle, made his first appearance on 25 December 2018. The character was mentioned by his on-screen family several times before his debut, while Kontzle's casting was announced shortly after his first episode aired. Billy is Jessie Grant's (Sandra Marvin) son and Ellis Chapman's (Aaron Anthony) half-brother. Prior to his arrival, it emerged that he was serving time in prison for GBH. Billy's appearance also started a new storyline with Aaron Dingle (Danny Miller), who served time with Billy and was bullied by him. Of the character, Marvin commented, "Billy's arrival causes a whole heap of trouble for various reasons. There are even more things than I realised at the time as well. Billy turning up causes problems with Ellis and with other people in the village as well. In terms of the family unit, Tall Trees is a small house and there's a lot of them in there. Ellis and Billy have got a lot to get over."

== Other characters ==
Date(s)	Character	Actor	Circumstances
2 January–5 April	Syd MacFarlane	James Foster	Syd is being transferred in to court in the same van as Adam Barton (Adam Thomas). Syd tries to make conversation with Adam and tells him about his charges. The van is stopped by Aaron Dingle (Danny Miller) and Adam's step-father Cain Dingle (Jeff Hordley), who tie the guards up. Cain releases Syd to make it look like he was the intended target, and sends him away in a truck to Scotland. Three months later, Syd spies on Aaron and Robert Sugden (Ryan Hawley). He walks into their cottage and picks up Robert's son Sebastian White. He asks Aaron for £100,000. Syd calls someone to let them know that he had visited Aaron. Aaron and Cain lock Syd in a cage and leave him by the lake. Syd later escapes and kidnaps Aaron. He sends Robert a video message threatening to kill Aaron if Robert does not pay up. Robert gets him the money and Syd leaves.
31 January–22 February	Phil Webb	Ryan Hayes	Phil is a handyman who is hired to do some work in David Metcalfe's (Matthew Wolfenden) shop. Phil meets David's wife Tracy (Amy Walsh) and she suggests they have a drink together in the pub. Tracy asks Phil if they have met before, as she thinks she recognises him. Phil later watches David and Tracy from his van and then stares at an old picture of Tracy in lingerie. Phil befriends David and gives him some football tickets. With David at the match, Phil shows up at the shop, locks the door and takes Tracy's phone. He calls her Cindy and warns her not to say anything when Jacob Gallagher (Joe-Warren Plant) bangs on the door, or he will tell him that she used to be a prostitute. Phil then reveals that he has a video of them having sex and blackmails Tracy into giving him £1,000 or he will show David the video. Tracy later tells Phil that she cannot pay him and he suggests that she has sex with him instead. At a hotel, Tracy handcuffs Phil to the bed and takes a picture, threatening to send it to his wife. David then walks in on them and Tracy insists that she was not going have sex with Phil. The following day, Phil turns up at the shop and asks Tracy to delete the picture of him. Tracy knees him in the groin and later reports Phil to the police, leading to his arrest for blackmail and harassment.
12–16 February	Maisie	Wendy Craig	Maisie is Betty Eagleton's (Paula Tilbrook) friend, who leaves a tour bus to visit Betty's friend Sandy Thomas (Freddie Jones). Maisie gives Sandy some gifts from Betty and she misses her bus when they get talking. Maisie tells Sandy that she is leaving for Australia the following day. She gives Sandy a plane ticket from Betty, so he can visit her in Australia. Sandy initially decides against leaving the village, but his family persuade him to go and he joins Maisie and Betty.
9–10 April	Lara Webb	Imogen Cole	Lara is Phil Webb's (Ryan Hayes) daughter. After Tracy Metcalfe (Amy Walsh) reports Phil to the police for blackmail and harassment, Lara becomes convinced that Tracy is lying. She sprays graffiti on the door of Tracy's home and then sends her intimidating messages. Tracy soon catches her and Charity Dingle (Emma Atkins) tells Lara exactly what Phil did.
25 April–4 October	Connor	Cameron Jack	Connor is Dawn Taylor's (Olivia Bromley) pimp. When he returns home, he finds Dawn has taken some pills that Ross Barton (Michael Parr) left her. Dawn tells Connor that Ross lives in Emmerdale, so Connor goes to the village to find him. He asks Pete Barton (Anthony Quinlan) where Ross is, but Pete denies knowing him. Connor then attacks Pete, before Ross returns home and throws him out. Ross later meets with Connor at the cricket pavilion and offers him £200 for information on Simon McManus's (Liam Ainsworth) whereabouts. Connor wants Ross to prove how desperate he is and Ross punches him. Connor then offers him a job dealing drugs. When Ross is late to a drugs drop off, Debbie Dingle (Charley Webb) takes the blame. Ross admits his car was stolen, so Connor threatens his son's life. Debbie tells Connor that she will get him the money instead, but later finds Ross's car and returns the drugs to Connor. Connor then reveals that he had no intention of telling Ross about Simon, and he punches Debbie. Ross asks Dawn to get Connor to meet him and he shows Connor a gun, before asking him about Simon. Connor tells Ross that Simon was paid £100,000 to keep quiet in court by someone young and rich. Graham Foster (Andrew Scarborough) confronts Connor about punching Debbie and pulls several hairs from his head.
1 May–12 September	Chloe Bails	Joanna Miller	Chloe is the wife of Mark Bails (Rocky Marshall). Charity Dingle (Emma Atkins) watches them go into their house. Charity later confronts Bails at a sexual exploitation awareness campaign launch and reveals that he sexually abused her when she was fourteen. Chloe calls Charity a disgrace, as she is removed from the room. Weeks later, Bails and Chloe comes across Charity in the hospital and Charity realises Chloe is pregnant. Chloe refuses to believe Charity's allegations, but Charity confronts Bails in the stairwell and reveals that she gave birth to his baby.
23 May–19 September	Gaz	Jamie Dorrington	Gaz meets with Ross Barton (Michael Parr) to sell him a gun. Gaz tells Ross that he was only able to obtain a revolver. Ross pays Gaz and leaves.
29 May–3 January 2019	Irene Stocks	Amy Alexander (flashback); Eithne Browne	Irene is a midwife who looked after Charity Dingle (Emma Atkins) when she gave birth to a son. When Charity witnesses the doctors trying to revive the baby, she flees the hospital as she is unwilling to watch him die. Irene chases after her, but fails to catch up to her. When Irene returns to the room, she finds that the baby has survived; Charity, meanwhile, never returned to hospital, believing her son had died. Twenty-seven years later, Charity comes to the hospital and asks Irene if she remembers her, as she wants to locate her son's grave. Irene lies that she was not working at the hospital at that time and is thus unable to be of assistance, but when she returns home Irene looks at an adoption certificate for Charity's son, Ryan (James Moore), indicating that she had adopted him. In January 2022, Ryan learns that Irene has died from heart failure.
20 June–17 August	Beth	Annabelle Kaye	Daz Spencer (Mark Jordon) attempts to give Beth a flyer appealing for information about his missing daughter Amelia Spencer (Daisy Campbell). Beth returns home and it emerges she is taking care of Amelia, who she befriended in an online chatroom. It later transpires that Daz accidentally killed Beth's father whilst they were both serving in the British Army in Afghanistan in 2009, and that Beth plans to use Amelia to get revenge on Daz, and turn her against her whole family. Beth is arrested for kidnapping and perverting the course of justice after Bernice Blackstock (Samantha Giles) lures her to the cricket pavilion and hands her over to the police. Amelia tries to get in touch with Beth, and accuses her family after they scupper her efforts. After Beth is put on bail awaiting trial, Amelia follows her, only to discover that Beth wants nothing to do with her. Beth later returns to the village, despite her bail conditions meaning that she cannot be within a mile of Amelia, convincing Amelia to run away, permanently, to Edinburgh. Amelia appears to accept, but changes her mind at the last moment, realising that her family loves her more than anything, and returns to them. Beth is later sentenced, off-screen, to eight months in borstal.
31 July	Cheryl Foster	Vanessa Earl	Cheryl is the late wife of Graham Foster (Andrew Scarborough). She appears to Graham when he gets drunk. A flashback sequence shows how a drunk Graham killed Cheryl and their unborn child in a car crash.
9–16 August	Dom	Finlay Sheard	Dom is a patient in the same ward as Sarah Sugden (Katie Hill), who she befriends. Sarah's mother, Debbie Dingle (Charley Webb), realises that Dom has a crush on Sarah and teases him about it. Dom then collapses. Sarah later visits Dom in the intensive care unit and he tries to persuade her to have her operation. Sarah prepares to see Dom and dresses up, but is devastated when she sees Dom with another girl.
30 August	Dennis	Sam Barriscale	The estranged husband of Manpreet Jutla (Rebecca Sarker) and the father of her daughter Aiesha (Shila Iqbal). Dennis interrupts Manpreet’s date at the factory with Rishi Sharma (Bhasker Patel) demanding that Manpreet gives him his car back. Rishi is unhappy with Dennis’ behaviour and demands that Jai (Chris Bisson) restrains him until the police arrive. Manpreet argues that car belongs to both of them but Dennis still wanted it back. Rishi then tells Manpreet he will buy her a car so Manpreet gives Dennis the keys and walks off. In 2020, it is revealed that Dennis had an affair with Manpreet's sister Meena (Paige Sandhu) whilst they were married.
17–18 October	Glen Howell	David Lonsdale	When Victoria Barton (Isabel Hodgins) sought to track down her husband Adam (Adam Thomas) after he had been forced to leave the country after wrongly being accused to murdering his aunt Emma Barton (Gillian Kearney), she hired Glen, allegedly a private detective and former officer of Hotten Police, to learn what had happened to him. Victoria's brother Robert Sugden (Ryan Hawley) and Robert's husband Aaron Livesy (Danny Miller) along with Victoria's ex-boyfriend and Adam's brother Matty Barton all worried about the consequences of her actions, but these turned into serious concerns when former Hotten Police detective the Reverend Harriet Finch revealed that no officer by the name of Glen Howell had served in the force. Glen revealed that Adam was in Portugal, and took Victoria to the harbour where she last saw Adam, then demanded £5,000 from her (which Matty had stolen from her handbag). When Victoria revealed that she didn't have the money, Glen turned nasty, revealing that he was simply a con artist, unable to help her find "a man that even Interpol can't find" and attacked her. He was then knocked out by Aaron with a plank of wood.
