= The Mend (group) =

British boy band (2008–2016)

- Also known as: ASBRO (2008–2011); Race the Horizon (2015–2016)
- Origin: Manchester, England
- Genres: R&B, pop
- Years active: 2008–2016
- Label: Sony Music (2013–2016)
- Past members: Kris Evans; Jay Kontzle; Craig Worsley; Dean Kelly; Lewis Conroy
- Website: www.themend.uk.com

The Mend (subsequently known as Race the Horizon) were a British boy band consisting of members Kris Evans, Dean Kelly, Jay Kontzle and Craig Worsley. They originally auditioned for The X Factor in 2011 but failed to get any further than bootcamp, due to having a management deal. They went on to audition for Britain's Got Talent in 2012 and reached the semi-finals but, after the public vote was invoked, due to the judges' split decision, they failed to go through to the finals. They were then brought back by the judges for the final (as a wildcard) and finished in seventh place overall. They released their debut single "Where Were You" on 24 March 2013, independently.

== Career ==
=== 2008–11: Formation ===
In 2008 Nigel Martin-Smith, former manager of boy band Take That, formed a new vocal group after auditioning boys from the North West. The initial line up consisted of Lewis Conroy, Dean Kelly, Jayme Kontzle and Craig Worsley. The band was initially called ASBRO, a play on words related to an ASBO (Anti Social Behaviour Order), and were described by Danny McFadden in The Guardian as the new East 17.

Martin-Smith stated in an interview that, in seeking members for the band, he, "wanted them to be 'streetwise' as well as having bags of personality, a good voice and looking good in front of a camera."

In early 2010, Martin-Smith auditioned for a fifth member, which resulted in the addition of Kris Evans to the group. At this point, Lewis Conroy left the line up and the group became a four-piece consisting of Evans, Kelly, Kontzle and Worsley.

In 2011, due to the negative associations linked to the name ASBRO, the group became known as The Mend. Of the change, Dean Kelly stated in an interview, 'We loved the name Asbro, but we felt it was holding us back because there was negative feedback about it. We thought 'we need to mend this', hence how we came up with The Mend.' Jayme Kontzle added of the name change, "No record label has seen us as The Mend so it’s like a new start for us. It also stands for The Manchester End."

They stated during their first appearance on Britain's Got Talent in early 2012 that they had been together for three years.

=== 2012–13: Britain's Got Talent ===
The Mend auditioned for Britain's Got Talent in front of judges David Walliams, Alesha Dixon, Amanda Holden and Simon Cowell. They performed "(Sittin' On) The Dock of the Bay", receiving a standing ovation from the audience. They also received rave reviews from the judges, praising their own 'spin' on the song. They received four "yes" votes and were put through to the next round. A few weeks later they were shown being put through to the live semi-finals.

The Mend performed for a second time during the first semi-final on 6 May 2012, singing a mash-up of "(I Just) Died in Your Arms" and "Written in the Stars", and once again received rave reviews from the judges, with Cowell stating that there is a market for the band, and praising their vocals. The Mend were in the top three for the voting that night, and with dog act Ashleigh and Pudsey (the eventual winners) being the highest ranked act of the night with the highest number of votes, it was down to the judges to choose between The Mend and Only Boys Aloud for the next place in the final. Walliams and Holden opted for Only Boys Aloud, while Cowell and Dixon opted for The Mend, leading to a split decision. It was then revealed that Only Boys Aloud had the higher number of votes and were through to the final.

However, Ant & Dec announced at the start of the first semi-final that the judges had a wildcard and would be able to send a previously eliminated act through to Saturday's final. The judges eventually narrowed the choices down to three: The Mend, Four Corners and Twist and Pulse Dance Company and it was announced at the beginning of the final that The Mend would take that wildcard. They then went on to perform "Without You" and despite getting praise from the judges and a good response from the audience, The Mend finished in seventh place with 2.6% of the vote.

=== 2013–15: Post Talent ===
The Mend were one of the support acts for Little Mix on their 2013 DNA tour. They released their debut single "Where Were You" on 24 March 2013. The single reached number 67 in the UK Singles Chart. In July 2013, they embarked on their first headline tour, performing in Birmingham, London and Manchester. Their next single will be called "Oxygen" and by September 2013 they were in the studio recording their debut album.

=== 2015–2016: Debut album ===
It was announced that The Mend were back in the studios recording their next debut album. The Mend renamed themselves as Race the Horizon.

== Members ==
=== Kris Evans ===
Kris Evans is from Middleton, Greater Manchester. Evans was a producer, songwriter and rapper with the group.

=== Dean Kelly ===
Dean Kelly, born 16 November 1989, is from Stockport, Greater Manchester. He credited being part of The Mend as the reason he had stayed out of jail, a fate that befallen one of his older brothers, stating in an interview, "This group has given us a lifeline. Obviously, if I hadn't got into this group I’d have got into trouble. I am not doubting that." Kelly departed the band in 2015.

=== Jayme Kontzle ===
Jayme "Jay" Kontzle was raised by his grandparents in Crewe, Cheshire, after his mother was killed in a car crash when he was aged four. Kontzle was a songwriter, producer and singer with the group.

Following a year as a teaching assistant, Jay was cast in the role of Billy Fletcher, in the ITV soap Emmerdale, making his first appearance on screen in December 2018.

=== Craig Worsley ===
Craig Worsley is from Preston, Lancashire. Worsley was the lead singer of The Mend and a former choirboy. Simon Cowell stated that Worsley had "a great recording voice.".

== Discography ==
Year	Single	Peak chart positions		
Year	Single	UK	UK Indie	SCO
2013	"Where Were You"	67	10	—
