= Olivia Bromley =

English actress (born 1989)

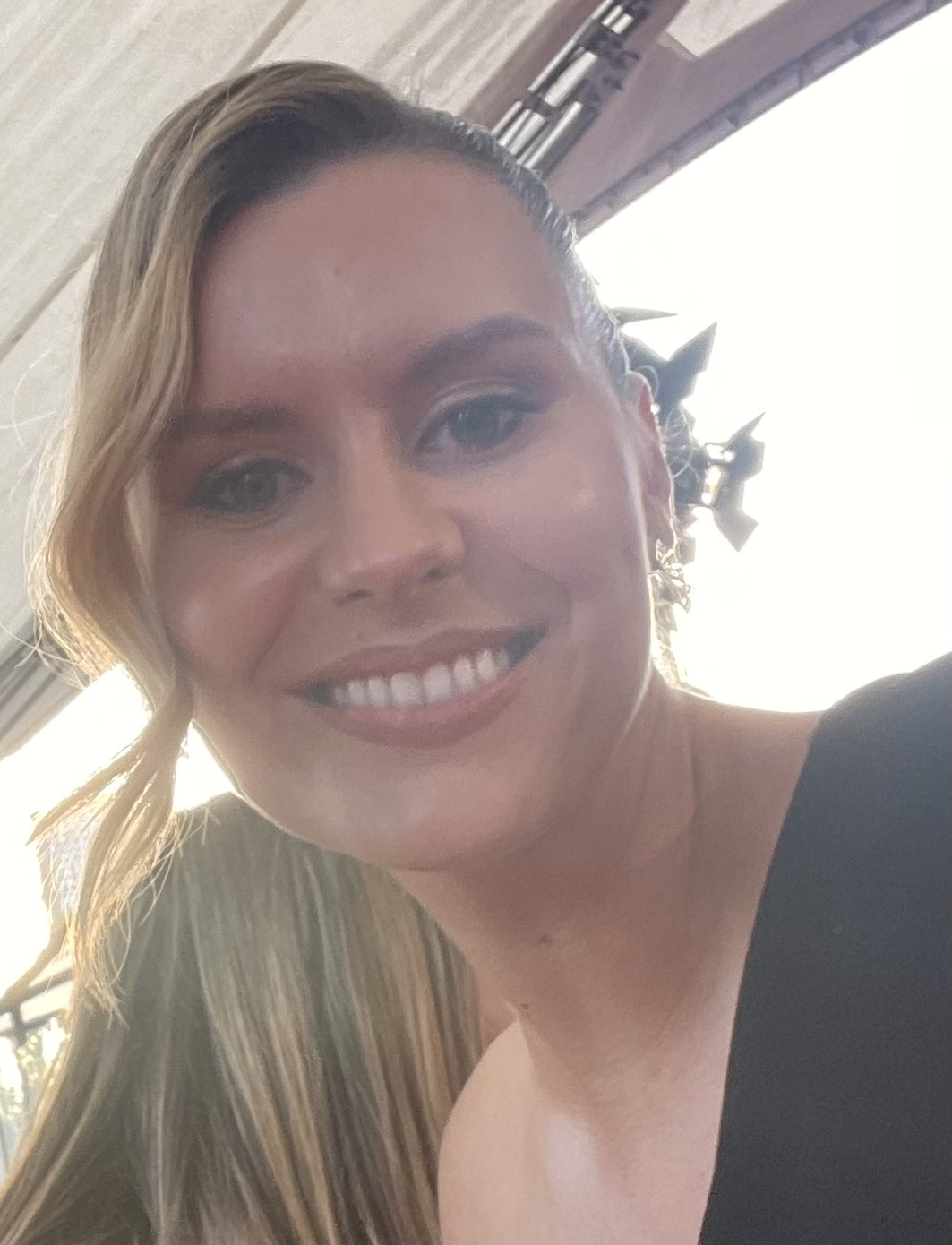
- Bromley in 2024
- Education: Oxford School of Drama
- Occupation: Actress
- Television: Emmerdale

Olivia Bromley (born 6 December 1995) is an English actress. She began her acting career in theatre, appearing in various productions including A Midsummer Night's Dream and Othello. Then in 2018, she was cast as Dawn Taylor in the ITV1 soap opera Emmerdale, for which she was nominated for Best Soap Newcomer at the TV Choice Awards, appearing until the character's death in 2026.

== Life and career ==
Bromley was born on 6 December 1995 and is from London. She trained at the Oxford School of Drama, after which she began performing in various theatre productions. These included Spent at the Soho Theatre, Rhythm of Silence at the Theatre Royal and Interrobang at the Arts Theatre. She was also a member of the band Damsen.

in 2018, Bromley made her film debut in Here Be Dragons. That same year, she made her television debut after being cast in the ITV1 soap opera Emmerdale. Her character, Dawn Taylor, was introduced as part of a storyline involving Ross Barton (Michael Parr) and appeared on a recurring basis. Following her initial appearances, Bromley's management confirmed that she would be returning to the soap as a regular cast member. For her role as Dawn, Bromley has been nominated for Best Soap Newcomer at the 2019 TV Choice Awards, as well as Soap Actor at the 2021 TRIC Awards. Bromley was axed from the soap in March 2026, and her final scenes as Dawn aired on 30 August 2026 after her character was killed off.

== Filmography ==
Year	Title	Role	Notes
2018	Here Be Dragons	Tina	Film
2018–2026	Emmerdale	Dawn Taylor	Regular role
2022	Britain Get Singing	Herself	Performer
2024	The Eyes of Marge	Leanne Holder	Short film

== Stage ==
- Gold Coast
- A Midsummer Night's Dream
- Rhythm of Silence
- Spent
- Othello
- Titus Andronicus

== Awards and nominations ==
Year	Ceremony	Category	Nominated work	Result	Ref.
2019	TV Choice Awards	Best Soap Newcomer	Emmerdale	Nominated	
2021	TRIC Awards	Soap Actor	Emmerdale	Longlisted	
