= Rebecca Sarker =

English actress

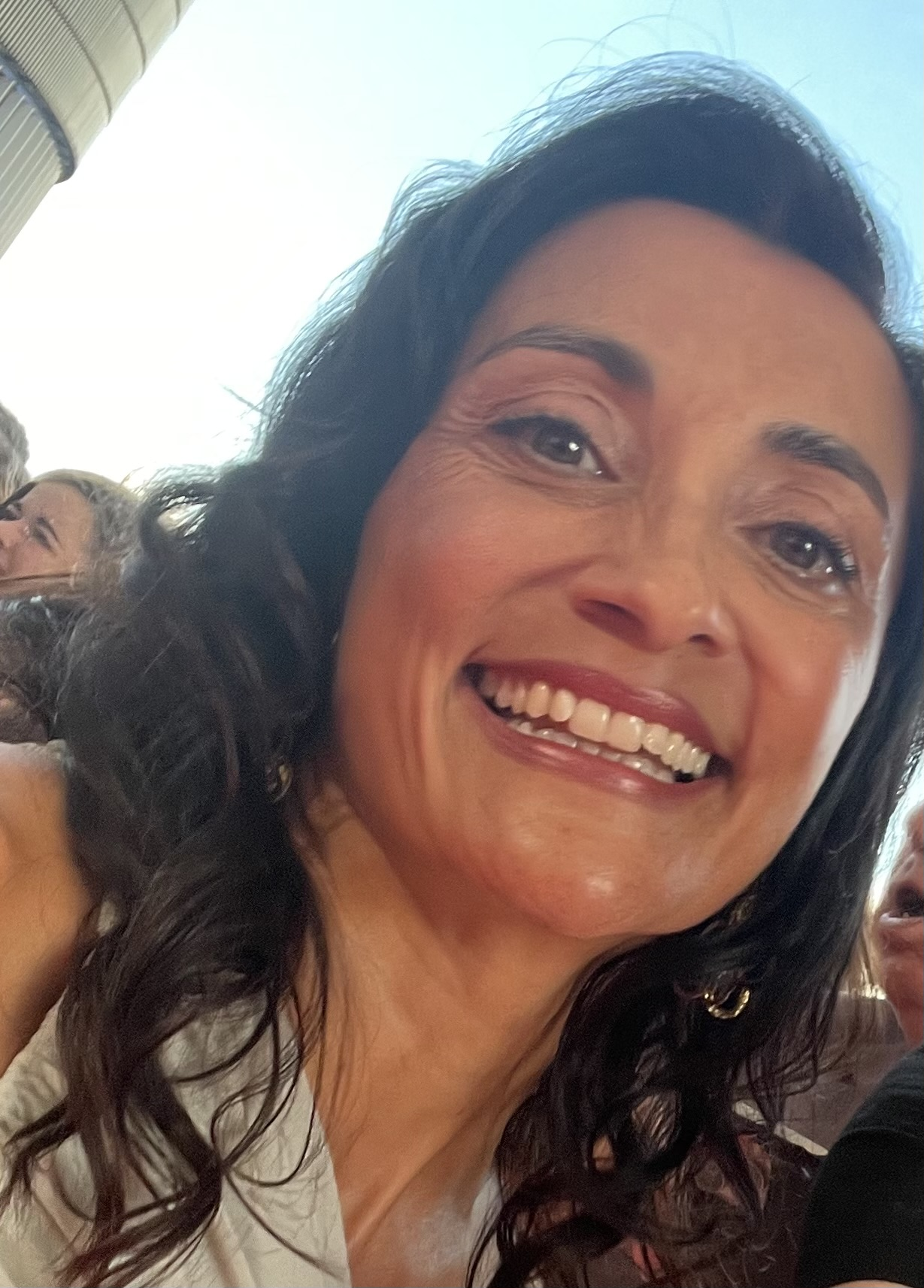
- Sarker in 2024
- Born: 1975 (age 50–51); Halifax, West Yorkshire, England
- Education: University of Leeds; Mountview Academy of Theatre Arts
- Occupation: Actress
- Years active: 1998–present
- Television: Coronation Street; Emmerdale
- Children: 2

Rebecca Sarker (born 1975) is an English actress. After playing Nita Desai in the ITV soap opera Coronation Street from 1999 to 2000, she made various appearances in television series including Rosemary & Thyme, Doctors, Holby City, The Golden Hour and EastEnders. In 2018, she began appearing in the ITV soap opera Emmerdale as Manpreet Sharma.

== Early life ==
Sarker is from Halifax, West Yorkshire. Her parents met while working at a hospital in Nottingham; her father, Khaleque, is a British Bangladeshi GP, and her mother, Elizabeth, is an English children's nurse. Her older brother is a dentist. Sarker attended Bradford Girls' Grammar School. She pursued a degree in Modern Languages at Leeds University and spent a year teaching English in Spain, where she took up flamenco dancing. She later trained at the Mountview Academy of Theatre Arts in London.

== Career ==
Sarker made her acting debut in the ITV soap opera Coronation Street as Nita Desai in 1999. Following her exit from the soap in 2000, she appeared in various television series, including two guest appearances on the BBC soap opera Doctors, appearances in the BBC medical dramas Holby City and Casualty and playing Dr Newton in two episodes of the BBC soap opera EastEnders. She then starred in the ITV miniseries The Golden Hour as Nina Osbourne in 2005. In 2012, she made her film debut in the feature film John Carter. In 2018, it was announced that she had been cast as series regular Manpreet Jutla in the ITV soap opera Emmerdale. Then in 2022, she competed in the revival of the ITV series The Games.

== Personal life ==
Sarker has two sons.

== Filmography ==
Year	Title	Role	Notes
1999–2000	Coronation Street	Nita Desai	Series regular; 122 episodes
2002	Believe Nothing	PC Haywain	Episode: "May as Well Face It, You're Addicted to Fudge"
2003, 2009	Doctors	Tepali Sharma / Deborah Mortimer	3 episodes
2003, 2006, 2017	Holby City	Nina Sharma / Carla Harris / Gayle Travis	3 episodes
2004	Fallen	Nisha Mehta	Television film. Main role
2005	The Golden Hour	Nina Osbourne	Mini-series. Main role; 4 episodes
2005	The Brief	DI Joan Fernandes	Episode: "The Architect's Wife"
2005	Broken News	Correspondant	Mini-series; Episode: "Hijack"
2006	Rosemary & Thyme	Blanca Parfitt	Episode: "Racquet Espanol"
2007	EastEnders	Dr Newton	2 episodes
2010, 2014	Casualty	Alison Roberts / DCI Jackie Prior	2 episodes: "Leave Me Alone" and "The Lies We Tell"
2012	John Carter	Stayman #1 / Navigator	Feature film
2012	Twenty Twelve	TV Reporter, Hilary	2 episodes: "Boycott: Part 1" and "Clarence House"
2018	Dark Heart	Smita Williams	Episode: "Dead Men Don't Pay Debts: Part 1"
2018–present	Emmerdale	Manpreet Sharma	Series regular
2022	The Games	Herself – Contestant	5 episodes
2024	Celebrity Catchphrase	Herself – Contestant	Episode: "Les Dennis, Rebecca Sarker and Jordan Stephens"
2026	Celebrity Bridge of Lies	Herself – Contestant	1 Episode

== Awards and nominations ==
Year	Award	Category	Result	Ref.
2022	2022 British Soap Awards	Best Leading Performer	Nominated	
2022	27th National Television Awards	Serial Drama Performance	Nominated	
2023	Inside Soap Awards	Best Partnership (with Kevin Mathurin)	Nominated	
