= Paddington Station 24/7 series 2 =

Paddington Station 24/7
- Series 2
- No. of episodes: 10

Release
- Original network: Channel 5
- Original release: March 26 – May 28, 2018

Series chronology
- ← Previous; Series 1 Next → Series 3

This is the list of episodes for Paddington Station 24/7 Series 2.

== Episodes ==
No. overall	No. in season	Title	Directed by	Narrated By	Original release date	United Kingdom viewers (millions)
9	1	"Episode #2.1"	Tim Pritchard	Jason Done	March 26, 2018	1.75
When the 'Beast from the East' and winter storm Emma collide over the UK station managers have to decide whether to close the station entirely for the first time since WWII. Prince Harry and Meghan Markle board a train to Cardiff.
10	2	"Episode #2.2"	Tim Pritchard	Jason Done	April 2, 2018	2.09
Problems mount for railway staff with a truck striking a railway bridge, a woman having a cardiac arrest and a major scare when suspicious chemical containers are found shortly after the nerve agent attack in Salisbury.
11	3	"Episode #2.3"	Tim Pritchard	Jason Done	April 9, 2018	1.95
Transport Police track down a mysterious intruder known as "Spiderman". GWR MD Mark Hopwood performs the naming ceremony for a new electric train commemorating the creator of Paddington Bear.
12	4	"Episode #2.4"	Tim Pritchard	Jason Done	April 16, 2018	1.57
News of a fatality at Slough station reaches Swindon control room leading to a line closure to allow emergency services access. A Thai princess takes a tour of Paddington. Thieves have raided a scrap yard and used the track to escape.
13	5	"Episode #2.5"	Tim Pritchard	Jason Done	April 23, 2018	1.72
A broken down train causes major disruption during the morning rush hour. Staff face further challenges due to a string of medical emergencies at the station and an act of sabotage on the tracks.
14	6	"Episode #2.6"	Tim Pritchard	Jason Done	April 30, 2018	1.81
A circuit failure closes Platform 5 which is used by numerous high-speed trains. British Transport Police are out in force as rival football fans pass through the station. A man is spotted in a dangerous place.
15	7	"Episode #2.7"	Tim Pritchard	Jason Done	May 7, 2018	1.55
Winter storm Eleanor hits and a plastic bag causes a power outage trapping three trains. A falling tree strikes a train near Hungerford. Engineers work through the night after a crack is discovered on points near Oxford.
16	8	"Episode #2.8"	Tim Pritchard	Jason Done	May 14, 2018	1.35
The Cheltenham Festival means thousands of extra passengers. Potential flooding at Cowley Bridge could cut the whole of Devon off. Thermal imaging is used to inspect track. An illegal settlement must be evicted from Network Rail land.
17	9	"Episode #2.9"	Tim Pritchard	Jason Done	May 21, 2018	1.51
The Easter getaway brings huge numbers of passengers to the station and problems. 500 staff carry out a vast resignalling project. Moses keeps an eye out for fare dodgers.
18	10	"Windsor Wedding Special"	Tim Pritchard	Jason Done	May 28, 2018	1.38
Staff prepare for a huge influx of passengers heading to Windsor for the royal wedding while at the same time decorating the station, planning security and dealing with the usual daily demands. This episode features Prince Harry and Meghan Markle.
