= Paddington Station 24/7 series 3 =

Paddington Station 24/7
- Series 3
- No. of episodes: 10

Release
- Original network: Channel 5
- Original release: 17 September – 27 December 2018

Series chronology
- ← Previous; Series 2

This is the list of episodes for Paddington Station 24/7 Series 3.

== Episodes ==
No. overall	No. in season	Title	Directed by	Narrated By	Original release date	United Kingdom viewers (millions)
19	1	"Episode #3.1"	Tim Pritchard	Jason Done	17 September 2018	1.64
A member of the public puts himself at risk by running along the tracks, all trains are halted while transport police chase the intruder. The installation of overhead cables and new ticket machines also cause delays.
20	2	"Episode #3.2"	Tim Pritchard	Jason Done	24 September 2018	1.72
The heatwave hits the network hard, with signalling equipment out at Didcot, rails in need of stretching in London and even the windscreen wipers are unable to clear all the insects hitting drivers' windows.
21	3	"Episode #3.3"	Tim Pritchard	Jason Done	1 October 2018	1.72
British Transport Police mount a special operation to stop criminals running drugs out of London. A cracked rail is discovered at Acton. A passenger falls between train and platform and police talk down a suicidal woman.
22	4	"Episode #3.4"	Tim Pritchard	Jason Done	8 October 2018	1.75
A vital piece of track insulating equipment fails throwing services into chaos. Engineers discover rotting wooden sleepers. Staff are shocked when a driver tries to start a train from the wrong end.
23	5	"48 Hour Meltdown"	Tim Pritchard	Jason Done	15 October 2018	1.61
It's a tough start to Monday morning as weekend works at Acton have overrun, a lorry rips the safety barriers off a level crossing as it runs the lights, and 'the flying banana' trails the rails for defects.
24	6	"Episode #3.6"	Tim Pritchard	Jason Done	22 October 2018	1.71
Huge delays occur after a man is hit by a train at Southall, more chaos ensues when power to the track is accidentally switched off. Hundreds of rail enthusiasts descend of Paddington to see the Flying Scotsman.
25	7	"Episode #3.7"	Tim Pritchard	Jason Done	29 October 2018	1.61
A drunken man on the tracks forces a line closure. Engineers insert 24 huge culverts at Cowley Bridge near Exeter to ease flooding. At Paddington staff have to deal with tricky customers.
26	8	"Episode #3.8"	Tim Pritchard	Jason Done	5 November 2018	1.67
The bank holiday works schedule is disrupted when reports come in of a trespasser on the relief lines outside of London, forcing the cancellation of all trains leaving Paddington station. However, the total shutdown allows the engineers onto the track to renew large sections of the ageing rail infrastructure.
27	9	"Episode #3.9"	Tim Pritchard	Jason Done	12 November 2018	1.42
Staff spring into action when an unexploded WWII bomb is found near the line in Teignmouth, transport police question a man who jumped onto the track to retrieve something he dropped.
28	10	"...at Christmas"	Tim Pritchard	Jason Done	27 December 2018	1.21
Station assistant Richard handles a medical emergency that may not be what it seems, engineers work round the clock to finish before bad weather hits, and the staff sit down for a Christmas lunch - of curry!
