= Paddington Station 24/7 series 1 =

Paddington Station 24/7
- Series 1
- No. of episodes: 8

Release
- Original network: Channel 5
- Original release: March 23 – October 30, 2017

Series chronology
- Next → Series 2

This is the list of episodes for Paddington Station 24/7 Series 1.

== Episodes ==
No. overall	No. in season	Title	Directed by	Narrated By	Original release date	United Kingdom viewers (millions)
1	1	"Episode #1.1"	Ben Gray, Kevin Jarvis, Melissa McCall, Jeremy Rodway, Tim Pritchard	Jason Done	September 11, 2017	1.85
Extra trains have been laid on for 20,000 football fans attending the UEFA Champions League Final in Cardiff. However, a terrorist incident at London Bridge makes getting them home difficult.
2	2	"Episode #1.2"	Ben Gray, Kevin Jarvis, Melissa McCall, Jeremy Rodway, Tim Pritchard	Jason Done	September 18, 2017	1.89
At the height of summer temperatures soar, warping iron tracks and delaying trains. Trespassers on the line, suspected drug-users and an electrocuted pigeon also cause problems.
3	3	"Episode #1.3"	Ben Gray, Kevin Jarvis, Melissa McCall, Jeremy Rodway, Tim Pritchard	Jason Done	September 25, 2017	1.69
A fire alarm leads to the station being evacuated. Safety checks reveal some of the secrets of the tunnels beneath the station. Soaring temperatures disrupt the Bank Holiday getaway.
4	4	"Episode #1.4"	Ben Gray, Kevin Jarvis, Melissa McCall, Jeremy Rodway, Tim Pritchard	Jason Done	October 2, 2017	1.78
Signal problems lead to congestion at rush hour. 24 hours later the same signal causes further problems leading to services being suspended. Engineers race to replace 60 feet of track in 4 hours.
5	5	"Episode #1.5"	Ben Gray, Kevin Jarvis, Melissa McCall, Jeremy Rodway, Tim Pritchard	Jason Done	October 9, 2017	1.82
The Queen arrives at Paddington aboard one of GWR new Intercity Express Trains. At Reading station, Revenue Protection Officer Lyn has to call for back-up when a fare-dodger makes a run for it.
6	6	"Episode #1.6"	Ben Gray, Kevin Jarvis, Melissa McCall, Jeremy Rodway, Tim Pritchard	Jason Done	October 16, 2017	1.87
A driver raises the alarm when his train hits something, or someone, on the line. Heavy rain brings down a tree, blocking the line between Banbury and Oxford. Engineers begin the complex process of dismantling a Victorian viaduct.
7	7	"Episode #1.7"	Ben Gray, Kevin Jarvis, Melissa McCall, Jeremy Rodway, Tim Pritchard	Jason Done	October 23, 2017	1.93
Sunday's service grinds to a halt when a train derails in the station. A knife-carrying passenger cause concern at Bristol. Cleaning staff respond to passengers flushing toilets while trains are in the station.
8	8	"Episode #1.8"	Ben Gray, Kevin Jarvis, Melissa McCall, Jeremy Rodway, Tim Pritchard	Jason Done	October 30, 2017	1.47
Transport Police are called after a passenger urinates in a carriage. A low bridge has to be assessed after a van collides with it. The brakes on a train pulling into Reading fail causing disruption
