= Junior Doctors: Your Life in Their Hands =

- Genre: Factual
- Narrated by: Jason Done
- Ending theme: "Levels" by Avicii (Series 2)
- Country of origin: United Kingdom
- Original language: English
- No. of series: 3
- No. of episodes: 20

Production
- Running time: 60 minutes

Original release
- Network: BBC Three
- Release: 22 February 2011 – 28 February 2013

Related
- Junior Paramedics; Junior Doctors – One Year Check Up

Junior Doctors: Your Life in Their Hands is a BBC Three television series looking at how a group of foundation doctors cope with life on the wards. Three series have been broadcast to date, all narrated by Jason Done.

The first, broadcast in 2011, focused on seven foundation doctors at Newcastle General Hospital and Royal Victoria Infirmary in Newcastle upon Tyne, three of which were newly qualified FY1s and four being FY2s. The second series was broadcast in 2012 and followed six FY1s and two FY2s at Chelsea and Westminster Hospital in London. A third series, filmed at the Royal Liverpool University Hospital, was broadcast in 2013 and followed five FY1 doctors and two FY2 doctors.

On 9 March 2011 the show achieved BBC Three's highest ever ratings for a factual entertainment programme, when 1.44 million people watched the third episode of the first series.

== Doctors ==
=== Series one ===
The first series of six episodes ran from 22 February to 29 March 2011. The series followed a group of seven junior doctors at the Newcastle General Hospital and Royal Victoria Infirmary. On 13 October 2011, BBC Three aired a follow-up special, entitled Junior Doctors – One Year Check Up.

- Adam Beaini, age 24, F1 (Newcastle University)
- Katherine Conroy, age 24, F1 (University of Cambridge)
- Lucy Holmes, age 24, F1 (Newcastle University)
- Jon Barclay, age 24, F2 (Newcastle University)
- Suzi Batchelor, age 24, F2 (Newcastle University)
- Andy Kong, age 25, F2 (Newcastle University)
- Keir Shiels, age 28, F2 (University of Cambridge)

=== Series two ===
The second series consisted of seven episodes and ran from 24 January to 6 March 2012. The series followed a group of eight junior doctors at the Chelsea and Westminster Hospital. On 3 December 2012, BBC Three aired a follow-up special, entitled Junior Doctors – One Year Check Up.

- Sameer Bahal, age 25, F1 (Imperial College London)
- Akira Fukutomi, age 25, F1 (Imperial College London)
- Lucy Hollingworth, age 25, F1 (University of Manchester)
- Priya Mangat, age 25, F1 (King's College London)
- Milla Marinova, age 26, F1 (Barts and The London School of Medicine and Dentistry)
- Andy Steval, age 23, F1 (Newcastle University)
- Ben Allin, age 26, F2 (Imperial College London)
- Amieth Yogarajah, age 27, F2 (University of Cambridge)

=== Series three ===
The third series consisted of seven episodes and ran from 17 January to 28 February 2013. The series followed a group of seven junior doctors at the Royal Liverpool University Hospital. An eighth junior doctor, Carol Sondhi, 27, from Malawi was filmed for the series but did not feature in the opening episode.

- Edward Bennison, age 28, F1 (University of Ferrara (Italy))
- Tom Morris, age 25, F1 (University of Liverpool)
- Emily Phipps, age 25, F1 (University of Liverpool)
- Tristan Townsend, age 28, F1 (University of Liverpool)
- Jennifer Whiteley, age 25, F1 (University of Liverpool)
- Oliver Harris, age 25, F2 (University of Nottingham)
- Kiera Vaughan, age 25, F2 (Keele University)

=== Series four ===
Series 4, renamed Junior Doctors: Blood, Sweat and Tears, began on 25 October with seven new doctors at Wolverhampton's New Cross Hospital.

=== Series five ===
Series 5, renamed Junior Doctors: On the Front Line, began on 22 September 2019 with six new doctors at Salford Royal Hospital.

- Nicholas Ronan, age 28, F1
- Howra Ktayen, age 24, F1
- Sofia Arkhipkina, age 24, F1
- Zohaib Khawaja, age 25, F1
- Luke Mcevoy, age 26, F2
- Thomas Gubbin, age 26, F2

=== Spin-off ===
A spin-off, Junior Paramedics: Your life in Their Hands, was broadcast from February to April 2014. The show follows nine junior paramedics, Lucy Wright, Bryn Griffiths, Stephanie Cook, Lucy Mellor, Max Brufton, Amy Allen, Ashley Strawbridge, Victoria Hilditch and Nick Bailey on a six-week placement with East Midlands Ambulance Service.

== Transmissions ==
Series	Start date	End date	Episodes
1	22 February 2011	29 March 2011	6
2	24 January 2012	6 March 2012	7
3	17 January 2013	28 February 2013	7
