= Paddington Station 24/7 =

British documentary television

- Genre: Documentary
- Directed by: Ben Gray; Tim Pritchard; Melissa McCall; Jeremy Rodway; Amy Jenkins; Rachel Cumella; Kevin Jarvis; Donnovan Harris; Alex Price; Callum Brennan
- Narrated by: Jason Done
- Country of origin: United Kingdom
- No. of series: 4
- No. of episodes: 40

Production
- Executive producers: Michael Kelpie; Ed Taylor
- Producers: Tim Pritchard; Jennifer Walker
- Editor: Julian Nelson
- Running time: 60 minutes
- Production companies: Potato; ITV Studios; Channel 5

Original release
- Network: Channel 5
- Release: 11 September 2017 – 14 December 2020

Paddington Station 24/7 is a British documentary television series narrated by Jason Done. It first aired on Channel 5 on 11 September 2017. Series two aired from 26 March 2018, series three aired from 17 September 2018, a special four-part documentary called Paddington: A Year on the Tracks which showed the best bits of series 3 aired between May and June 2020 and the most recent series called Back on the Tracks aired from 26 October 2020.

The first series of the show was aired in Australia on 14 July 2018.

== Plot ==
The documentary series takes you behind the scenes of London Paddington station and their day-to-day activities in and around the station.

== Series overview ==
To date, 4 series have been broadcast, as summarised below.

Series	Episodes	Originally released	
Series	Episodes	First released	Last released
1	8	11 September 2017	30 October 2017
2	10	26 March 2018	28 May 2018
3	10	17 September 2018	27 December 2018
4	11	26 October 2020	14 December 2020
