= The Royal Today =

British television drama series (2008)

- The Royal Today titles
- Genre: Medical drama
- Created by: Ken Horn
- Written by: Sarah Bagshaw; Darren Fairhurst; Mark Holloway; Patrick Melanaphy; Chris Parker; Jonathan Rich
- Starring: Andrew Scarborough; Paul Nicholas; Kirsty Mitchell; Fiona Dolman
- Country of origin: United Kingdom
- Original language: English
- No. of series: 1
- No. of episodes: 50 (list of episodes)

Production
- Running time: 30 minutes (including adverts)
- Production company: ITV Productions

Original release
- Network: ITV
- Release: 7 January – 14 March 2008

Related
- The Royal; Heartbeat

The Royal Today is a British medical drama, and a spin-off of the similarly themed drama The Royal. The concept is that, while The Royal is set in the late 1960s, The Royal Today featured the same hospital in the present day, with a new set of characters working in the same location. Each episode follows the events of a single day, and the show was broadcast daily (except for the weekends), so the series could be said to progress in real time.

The first series of 50 half-hour episodes began on 7 January 2008 on the ITV network airing from 4 pm to 4:30 pm. Although there were a number of running storylines, the series generally eschewed the use of cliffhangers. The series was axed in March 2008 after poor ratings – an average of 1.175 million viewers.

== Cast and characters ==
Actor	Character	Role	Episodes
Andrew Scarborough	Dr Jonathan Ormerod (son of Dr Gordon Ormerod and Dr Jill Weatherill from The Royal)	Consultant physician, medical director	1–50
Paul Nicholas	Mr Woods	Consultant general surgeon, clinical lead	1–50
Kirsty Mitchell	Dr Sarah Chatwin	Specialist registrar in general medicine	1–50
Fiona Dolman	Pamela Andrews	Specialist registrar in general surgery	1–50
Caroline Carver	Heather Dunstan	Staff nurse	1–50
Ben Hull	Adam Fearnley	Charge nurse	1–50
Mark Wells	Kieran Marwood	A&E staff nurse	1–50
Sophia Di Martino	Gemma Pennant	Student nurse	1–50
Lucie Trickett	Carrie Jepson	Student nurse	1–50
Jon Lolis	Kristaps	Porter	1–50
Steve Huison	Norman Dunstan	Porter	1–50
Libby Davison	Isla Watkins	Theatre nursing sister	1–50
Victoria Pritchard	Alana Sczumanska	Anaesthetist	1–50
Lisa Davina Phillip	Pearl McDonald	Nurse	1–50
Pal Aron	Dr Vijay Chohan	Radiology Registrar	3–50
Leah Bracknell	Jenny Carrington	Clinical matron	3–50
Flora Nicholson	Lesley Goodrich		1–2 (Murdered)
Edward Peel	David Collingworth		1–25 (Transferred)
Vickie Gates	Maisy Spencer		40–47 (Discharged)
Laura Carter	Charlotte Winters	Patient	34

== Setting ==
There are two separate blocks at St. Luke's in Bradford used for shooting The Royal and The Royal Today. One of the previously unused blocks has undergone a makeover to transform it into a modern hospital, this also includes a bar area (seen in episode one) having been built. Exterior shots are filmed around North Yorkshire, particularly Scarborough. The last day of shooting the series was Friday 16 November 2007.

Named wards include:

Ward	Opened by	Named after	Explanation
Middleditch Wing (General Surgery)	Unknown	Middleditch Family	Mr TJ Middleditch was the hospital's secretary from 1948 until the late 1960s, and his grandfather was the founding member of The Royal when it was opened in 1886.
Woods – Coombes Ward	Mr Coombes	Mr Woods; Mr Coombes	Woods – Coombes ward is part of Middleditch Ward. In 2008, millionaire Mr Ray Coombes was taken into surgery for a life-saving operation. Mr Woods had a bet with Coombes that if he got out alive he would fund a new ward. As Mr Woods convinced him to, Matron said his name could be on the ward instead of Coombes', but Mr Woods said that would be unfair and that both their names should be on it.
Middleditch Ward	Unknown	Middleditch Family	Middleditch Ward is housed in the Middleditch Wing and run by Charge Nurse Adam Fearnley.
Goodwin Ward	Unknown	Dr Jeff Goodwin	Goodwin Ward is housed in the Middleditch Wing upstairs and as of episode one of series one is closed for redecoration, as stated by Pearl.
Premature Baby Unit	Dr Jill Weatherill	Dr Jill Weatherill	Jill campaigned to open this ward in the late 1960s. However, the maternity unit at The Royal was closed in 2006 (assuming The Royal Today is set in 2008).
High Dependency / Intensive Care Unit	NHS	Nobody	Ward where critically ill patients are closely monitored and treated.
Radiology	NHS	Unknown	X-ray department run by Vijay

== Episode list ==
Title	Original airdate	Episode no.
Episode 1	7 January 2008 UK / 5 May 2009 Australia	1 (1x01)
Student nurses Carrie, Lesley and Gemma are rushing to get ready for their first day on the wards at The Royal. Their day seems set for disaster when Gemma is almost run over by Charge Nurse Adam Fearnley before she has even set foot in the hospital. Dr Jonathan Ormerod and Dr Sarah Chatwin's first patient of the day is Ella, a young woman in her twenties, who has fainted and been brought to A&E by concerned fiancé Stan. Ormerod and Chatwin are concerned when they discover she has recently undergone breast enhancement surgery in Poland. She wants to be "Posh Spice perky" in time for her wedding in two weeks' time and arranged a cheap cosmetic surgery deal overseas. The doctors suspect she us suffering from a serious staphylococcal infection as a result of the surgery and much to Ella's dismay, Ormerod tells her she has to have the implants removed. Will Ella recover in time for her big day? On Middleditch Ward, Adam and Nurse Heather Dunstan are struggling to tend to their patients and have to deal with unruly nineteen-year-old Keeley whose intoxicated boyfriend cannot keep his hands off her. Their day goes from bad to worse when they are informed they have been landed with student nurses Carrie, Lesley and Gemma. Gemma and Carrie, who were looking forward to some hands-on experience with the patients, are disappointed when they are assigned to Nurse Pearl who has them preparing the lunch trolley and making beds. Meanwhile, Lesley is doing the rounds with Heather when they hear raucous noise coming from Keeley's cubicle. It becomes clear Keeley's far from charming family are visiting and have brought vodka onto the ward. Heather and Lesley confront the rowdy party and confiscate the alcohol. Both Keeley's father and her boyfriend Phil are furious. They do not take kindly to being told off and become aggressive towards the nurses. Is this the last they have heard from Keeley's family? In theatre, Consultant Surgeon Woods is operating on Ella. The infection is serious and he wastes no time as her life is under threat. She is more concerned her wedding dress will not fit if her bust size is reduced. The operation is successful, but Surgical Registrar Pamela is frustrated when Woods agrees to let her close the wound, but then takes over himself. Ella has no confidence without her implants and says she wants to have another operation once she has recovered. Will besotted Stan succeed in convincing Ella that looks are not everything? Back on Middleditch Ward, Lesley is making her way to the kitchen with the confiscated vodka bottle when Keeley's dad suddenly appears chasing after her and demanding his booze back. As he lunges forward, Lesley dodges him and he falls to the floor unconscious. She is in shock and horrified when the crash team arrives and Keeley's dad still has not come round. Eventually, they find a pulse and move him to intensive care. However, when Ormerod and Sarah break the news to Keeley, her unstable boyfriend is furious and menacingly promises he will not let them get away with this. Gemma and Carrie finish their day of menial labour and meet up with Lesley. They have arranged to go to the pub for a drink with Adam, to whom Gemma has taken a liking. As they are leaving, Lesley realises she has forgotten her swipe card and rushes back. On her way, she discovers Phil ransacking the drugs cabinets. She tries to placate him and asks him to leave but the angry thug attacks Lesley with a knife, leaving her seriously wounded on the ground. Will Sarah and Ormerod be able to save her before it is too late? Note: 1.99m tuned in to this episode Filming of the first episode began in July 2007
Episode 2	8 January 2008 UK / 6 May 2009 Australia	2 (1x02)
Ormerod is desperately trying to staunch Lesley's bleeding. She has been stabbed three times and has lost a lot of blood. She is in a critical condition and is rushed straight to theatre. Meanwhile, in casualty, Woods is with Mrs Ada Branksome, who has a blockage in her throat. Woods schedules her for an operation the next morning. Ada's daughter, Ellen, accompanies her mother. All is clearly not as it should be between them. In the pub, Gemma and Carrie are discussing their disappointing first day at work. While Adam is at the bar, Gemma reveals she fancies him, and Heather wastes no time in telling the feisty young nurse Adam is her boyfriend and they live together. Despite Heather saying she and Adam are rock solid, there is a sense she might feel threatened by the presence of the new student nurses. The police arrive at the crime scene and Ormerod informs them Phil, the suspect, is well known to the hospital owing to his mental health and drug dependency issues. Meanwhile, in theatre it does not look good for Lesley. Mr Woods is still attempting to stop the bleeding from Lesley's wounds. He cannot see what he is doing as there is so much blood, and the anaesthetist Alana cannot find Lesley's pulse. In casualty, Triage Nurse Kieran is dealing with a new patient – Phil. He's tried to escape over the perimeter fence and a nasty iron spike is now protruding from his upper thigh. He is high on drugs and screaming in agony. Kieran prepares to move him up to theatre. How will the doctors respond to Phil when his victim is in such a critical condition? Back in theatre, Woods is fighting a losing battle to save Lesley, but when the machine flatlines there is nothing more the team can do. Woods is furious he has been unable to save her and Alana has to break the bad news to distraught Gemma and Carrie. Everyone is feeling deflated and when Kristaps the porter comes rushing into theatre with Phil, and Ormerod informs them he is the attacker, Pamela is not sure she can go through with trying to save him. However, Woods urges her to be professional. The next day, Phil is still on the ward guarded by two police officers and everyone resents tending to the murderer of one of their colleagues. Woods asks for him to be transferred to Ashfordly General and Adam states the need for heightened security on the wards. Will the staff at The Royal feel safe again? As Ada goes up to theatre for her operation, it is clear she has a problematic relationship with Ellen who seems very upset. Woods discovers a large piece of sausage has been causing the blockage in Ada's throat. He also discovers a serious problem with her vocal cords. Ellen reveals to Woods her mother has been very difficult recently and she lost patience with her and forced the food down her throat. Her sense of shame is worsened when Woods breaks the news she has cancer of the larynx. Ellen is horrified that she has been so unsympathetic. Will Ada be able to forgive her daughter? Later that evening, Ormerod reveals to Sarah that his wife has moved to her parents' for a while with their three children as their relationship has been suffering recently. Sarah is shocked to learn that Ormerod has been living alone for so long, and offers to accompany him to dinner. However, his beeper goes off, and ever the professional, he heads to casualty. Will Ormerod confront his marital problems or continue to bury his head in his work? Note: 1.81m tuned in to this episode
Episode 3	9 January 2008 UK / 7 May 2009 Australia	3 (1x03)
A 17-year-old girl called Abigail arrives in casualty after falling off her horse. She is accompanied by her interfering father, Ben, and has abdominal pain. Ormerod quickly assesses her and believes the young girl is pregnant. Meanwhile, Gemma and Carrie have arrived in theatre to observe their first operation. On Middleditch Ward, Adam is losing patience with Heather's brother, Porter Norman, who seems to be using his sister as his personal laundry service. After performing an ultrasound scan on Abigail, Vijay, the radiology registrar, confirms Ormerod's suspicions. However, the scan shows she has had an ectopic pregnancy and will need an operation to remove the embryo. Abigail had suspected she might be pregnant after having a fling with a married man but is terrified at how her father will react and pleads with Ormerod not to tell him. Abigail could die if she does not have the operation, but how will her dad respond when she breaks the news? Elsewhere, Adam has an interview for the position of Matron, but keeps it a secret from everyone except Kieran. He arrives at the interview late, after being held up on the wards, and is nervous when he sees glamorous Jenny Carrington also waiting for an interview. She is characteristically aloof and dismissive. Will he get the job over this very self-assured woman? Back in theatre, Gemma and Carrie are unenthusiastically observing a hernia operation. When Carrie realises they are in the same room Lesley died in, she becomes very distressed. Woods is angry at being disrupted and demands the girls leave. They head out of the hospital to get an ice cream and bump into Adam on his way back from the interview. Will Gemma and Carrie keep Adam's secret? Meanwhile, Ormerod has the unpleasant task of informing Ben his daughter is about to have an operation, the nature of which she has asked him to keep confidential. Ben does not take kindly to being kept in the dark and enraged he jumps to the conclusion that she is pregnant and has asked for an abortion. Ormerod unsuccessfully tries to calm him down, but Ben is furious and bursts onto the ward, only to find Abigail is not in her bed. Where has Abigail gone? Her condition is serious. What state will she be in if they manage to find her? Woods has had a follow-up appointment with Si Fratelli, a forty-year-old vasectomy reversal patient. He wants to have children with his new partner. He already has two sons with his ex-wife, but oddly his sperm count is still negative. Woods explains this is a highly unlikely result and Si has probably always been infertile owing to a childhood illness. How will Si react when he discovers he is not the biological father of his children? Elsewhere, Vijay has his eye on Pamela and continues to flirt with her despite her obvious disinterest. Gemma cheekily tells Adam she will keep his secret if he will sign her course assessment book for her day in theatre. Adam begrudgingly agrees. After a hectic day, Ormerod finally decides to unwind and takes Sarah out for a drink. Note: 1.78m tuned in to this episode
Episode 4	10 January 2008 UK / 8 May 2009 Australia	4 (1x04)
Gemma and Carrie are feeling a little worse for wear when they arrive on the wards the morning after a night of drinking. Both girls are finding it hard to cope with the grief of losing Lesley, so considering the circumstances Adam is understanding. Ormerod's first patient is sixty-year-old Barry Kepler, who has just flown in from Australia and arrives at St Aidan's with his daughter Elizabeth after suffering acute abdominal pains on the aeroplane. Ormerod contacts his doctor in Australia and discovers he was admitted to hospital for a sigmoidoscopy and they have been trying to contact him urgently for weeks. Elizabeth is shocked and hurt that her father has not told her. Is Barry's condition more serious than he realises? Meanwhile, in casualty, Sarah is examining Paul, a strapping athlete who has developed ulcers on his leg. He has come to the hospital with his girlfriend Cassie. Neither Sarah nor Ormerod can identify what has caused the ulcers. Barry's scans show he has bowel cancer, which has spread to his liver and lungs, and even with surgery his chances do not look good. Ormerod breaks the news to Barry, and Elizabeth, who is furious her father has not taken better care of himself and listened to his doctor's warnings. Barry confesses to Ormerod that Elizabeth never really forgave him for moving to Australia with her mother who has since died. He feels he is nothing more than a burden to his family. Will Barry be able to make peace with his daughter in his dying days? Paul sheds new light on the cause of his mysterious ulcers, revealing to Sarah he has served in Iraq. He does not want his girlfriend Cassie to find out, as she is a pacifist and takes part in anti-Iraq war demonstrations. With this knowledge, Sarah asks Pamela to take a look. Pamela instantly suspects Paul has a case of leishmaniasis, an infestation caused by sand flies, which lay eggs under the skin, leading to ulcers known as "Baghdad boils". As Pamela speaks to Paul about his time in Iraq, Cassie looks puzzled and immediately confronts him. The couple are deeply in love, but will Cassie be able to come to terms with the fact Paul has been to war? Elsewhere, after Adam's mysterious disappearance yesterday, Heather suspects he is hiding something from her when she finds his suit stuffed in a bag on the shelf. She accosts Kieran for information who reveals Adam has applied for the matron's job. Heather confronts her boyfriend who explains he wanted to surprise her. Will Adam be successful? After enjoying a meal together the previous night, Sarah asks Ormerod to come for a drink after work. Ormerod opens up to her about the state of his personal life. As Sarah goes to comfort him, there is a moment between them – they could kiss, but Ormerod pulls away feeling awkward and immediately heads back to the ward leaving Sarah alone. There is definitely chemistry between them, but will Ormerod let himself fall for Sarah? Note: 1.75m tuned in to this episode
Episode 5	11 January 2008 UK / 11 May 2009 Australia	5 (1x05)
It is Gemma and Carrie's first day in casualty and they are unimpressed with the lack of activity. It is not long before an emergency arises and Gemma is called to assist. The patient is sixteen-year-old Luke, who has fallen off a motorbike and broken his arm. He arrives in casualty with his friend Billy. However, when the boys are told the police want to speak to them, Gemma witnesses some contention between them and it is clear they have something to hide. Ormerod is on his way back from the radiology department when Sarah passes him and tries to speak to him about the night before, but Ormerod is uncomfortable and tells a disappointed Sarah to forget about it. Is Ormerod's curt behaviour hiding deeper feelings? Sarah is called down to casualty, which is thronged with people dressed up in Star Trek costumes vomiting into paper bowls. Brownlee, who is dressed as Captain Kirk, explains they went for an all-you-can-eat curry to celebrate their first successful tribute show and now all have abdominal pain and upset stomachs. Carrie is less than thrilled when she is given the task of collecting their used vomit bowls. Meanwhile, Luke's mum, Alison, has arrived at the hospital, as he is about to go into theatre and quickly tries to interrogate him about the accident. It becomes apparent he has stolen his late father's motorbike with no licence or insurance. Alison seems confused about why Luke would act so recklessly and out of character. Is there more to the story than he is letting on? The staff on the wards launch into action, ready to receive the patients suffering from food poisoning. Gemma and Carrie are not pleased when Heather asks them to take stool samples from each of the patients. After being surrounded by vomit all day and witnessing Brownlee be sick all over Pamela's shoe, Carrie is not fairing too well and finally becomes ill herself...all over Pamela's other shoe. Elsewhere, Billy is being interviewed by a police officer telling him Luke had been planning to race a mystery bloke and he had tried to persuade him not to go through with it. However, Ormerod is still not convinced by his story. Back on Middleditch Ward, the results from the stool samples have come back from pathology and have blood in them. Pamela quickly makes her diagnosis and orders treatment. She is anxious to get the job finished and leave as she has a weekend in the south of France booked. However, Sarah takes another look at the notes and spots that Mr Brownlee did not submit a stool sample and his tests are irregular. She also notices that he is a vegetarian, and so would not have eaten the dodgy chicken curry that has made everyone else ill. What is causing his abdominal pain? And will Pamela make her flight? Meanwhile, Luke comes round from his operation and reveals Billy is to blame for the accident. He has been bullying him for months and told him he would leave him alone if he raced his friend. Ormerod is convinced there is more to it and probes further. He finally gets Billy to reveal he has turned against his friend because his mum has been having an affair with his dad. Alison realises that Luke was just trying to defend his mum and reassures him that no one will ever take his dad's place and that they should not keep secrets from one another. Will the two boys be able to reconcile their differences? Back on Middleditch Ward, Pamela has been ordering Sarah around all afternoon. Not surprisingly, when it seems Brownlee's problem is more complicated and he needs to have his back passage examined, Pamela once again tries to delegate the unpleasant task to Sarah. Sarah reminds her she is the experienced surgeon and she would not want to stand in her way. Brownlee has appendicitis and when Woods tells Pamela to stay and carry out the operation, Pamela's planned weekend away is in tatters. Gemma and Carrie discuss Lesley's funeral, and explain how they are going to say goodbye to her in their own way, reminding everyone life is for living. Adam, however, has a less positive outlook when he returns from personnel with the news he has not been successful in his application to be the new matron. Everyone is shocked and disappointed, and Heather is hurt when he decides to drown his sorrow with his friends in the pub. Are cracks beginning to form in their relationship? And who is the new matron? Note: 1.76m tuned in to this episode.
Episode 6	14 January 2008 UK / 12 May 2009 Australia	6 (1x06)
"It is Jenny Carrington's first day at The Royal as the new matron and everyone is curious to meet the external candidate who has successfully landed the job. As Jenny arrives, Kristaps realises Norman has not furnished her office. He frantically tries to find furniture, while Norman makes a futile attempt to stall Jenny, who will not be pushed about and demands to be taken straight to her office. Norman reluctantly makes his way there and, en route, it becomes clear Jenny is in a serious amount of pain. As she arrives at her empty office, she is feeling so ill that she decides to take herself to A&E. What is wrong with Matron? On the ward, Adam, who is unaware Matron is in A&E and still bitter about the job, is furious Jenny is late for her meeting with the nurses. As they wait for Matron, Gemma, Carrie and Heather are having a girly gossip. Heather reveals that she is waiting for Adam to pop the question. Is Adam as serious about their relationship as Heather is? Back in A&E, Ormerod has examined Jenny and suspects she has appendicitis and needs to go to surgery before her appendix ruptures. Jenny is close to tears. Can things get any worse on her first day? Meanwhile, Gemma and Pearl are tending to Michael, a patient in his twenties who has learning difficulties and has taken a particular liking to Gemma. Woods and Pamela go to check on him after his abdominal surgery, but his bed is empty. Where has he gone? Adam and Heather set out to look for Michael and find him at the vending machine, collapsed. He has burst his stitches after getting frustrated with the machine. Michael explains he was trying to buy Gemma, his "girlfriend", some crisps. Adam is concerned for Gemma and asks her to put a stop to Michael's attachment to her without breaking his heart. Elsewhere, Jenny is about to go into theatre and Woods seems to have it in for her already. He tells Alana management is the enemy and Jenny is worse than some, implying she is a wolf in sheep's clothing. It seems as though Jenny is going to have her work cut out before she is accepted by the staff at The Royal. Michael is back on Middleditch Ward after having his wound re-stitched and Gemma explains she cannot be his girlfriend and his nurse, so she should probably just stick to being his nurse. Meanwhile, Jenny is also recovering on the ward and asks for a private word with Adam. She makes it clear that she understands his frustration and will take on board his suggestions about changes that need to be made. Will she keep her word? Will Adam warm to the new matron? Note: 1.50m tuned in to this episode
Episode 7	15 January 2008 UK / 13 May 2009 Australia	7 (1x07)
Gemma and Pearl are tending to Zoe Jeffreys. She has been in a car accident and has a punctured lung and a haematoma on her liver. She has just come down from the high dependency unit, as her condition has improved. However, her mother Emma is still consumed with worry and concerned Zoe is not getting enough attention from the nurses. Her worries are intensified when she discovers Gemma is only a student nurse. Matron Jenny is working on her laptop from her hospital bed and is disappointed when Woods sarcastically tells her he is keeping her in for another day and he is sure the hospital can run without her for 24 hours. Ormerod explains Woods is not famed for his bedside manner and she reveals she has found it very useful seeing how the wards run from a patient's point of view. In fact, she has already decided changes need to be made. What does Jenny have in mind and how will the nurses receive her suggestions? Gemma is monitoring Zoe and is concerned when she suddenly takes a turn for the worse mid-conversation. Gemma raises the alarm and it is clear Zoe is in serious trouble. The situation becomes critical when Emma arrives back from the toilet to find her daughter in danger and immediately points the finger at Gemma. As soon as Woods arrives, the team leaps into action and Zoe is wheeled into theatre. Gemma is shaken by the whole experience and feels dreadful when she trips over and almost drops the drip. Gemma's distress is not helped by Emma's accusations that she should not be anywhere near patients. With an injured wrist and her pride battered and bruised, she makes her way to casualty. How will Gemma feel if Zoe does not pull through? Norman and Kristaps find a rare copy of a Sherlock Holmes novel when they are clearing out an old cupboard. They put it up for auction on an internet site, and fantasise about the future as they watch the bidding increase, but disaster strikes when the book is accidentally incinerated. Back on the ward, Heather and Adam are talking about Jenny. Heather feels Jenny is taking notes on them all and is worried when she discovers Emma is going to make a complaint about the level of nursing on the wards. Meanwhile, Gemma has been sent to ladies' man Vijay for an X-ray. However, she is not in the mood for his chat up lines and just wants to get back on to the ward. Will Gemma have chance to prove she is capable of becoming a good nurse? In theatre, they are losing Zoe; the team does all it can to resuscitate her. Sadly, they are unable to save her. Adam receives the call while he is with Gemma discussing Emma's complaint. He breaks the news to the young nurse who is devastated and flees the ward in floods of tears. Adam is left with the task of informing Emma that her daughter has died. Will the distraught mother blame Gemma for the loss? Gemma has decided she is not fit to be a nurse and is leaving The Royal. However, Adam reassures her that nursing is a hard profession and inevitably she will go through phases when she doubts herself. He urges her to get back to the ward. Will Gemma take Adam's advice and give it another go? The day's events have all been observed by the ever-watchful Jenny, who wants to have another word with Adam. She has noticed the discipline on the wards is not what it should be. Adam defends his team, explaining he has cut the student nurses some slack because their best friend was killed on the ward only a week ago. Jenny explains that she was not aware, and Adam curtly replies there is a lot she does not know. She should ensure she knows the full facts before passing judgement. Note: 1.36m tuned in to this episode
Episode 8	16 January 2008 UK / 14 May 2009 Australia	8 (1x08)
Seventeen-year-old athlete Chris Billson arrives in casualty after collapsing while jogging on the beach. He has regained consciousness and is keen to leave. He feels fine and is due to compete in a race that afternoon. However, Sarah is concerned about why a seemingly healthy young man should suddenly collapse and keeps him in to run some tests. Meanwhile, on Middleditch Ward, in spite of Adam's protestations, Jenny has discharged herself. She is sick of wasting time lying in bed and is keen to start her new job. Elsewhere, Woods is seeing Wendy, a patient with a swollen foot who suffers from peripheral neuropathym – a numbness of the nervous system, which is a common complication of diabetes. While on the ward, he notices Jenny is not in her bed and immediately strides off to confront her about ignoring his instructions. Jenny is ready for the fight and holds her own, but this is not the first time they have crossed each other; will this fiery pair ever be able to get along? Meanwhile, Chris's dad has arrived at the hospital convinced his son will be running a marathon that afternoon. He dismisses any concerns the doctors have and sets about discharging him, much to the fury of his wife Kim, who refuses to allow him to leave. Adam backs up Kim, telling Patrick that Chris is not to run in any races until the doctors know what is wrong with him, but Patrick is not prepared to back down. During the chaos, poorly Chris collapses again. In the X-ray department, Vijay reveals Wendy has a fish hook stuck in her foot. She has been unable to feel it owing to her neuropathy. However, when Pamela asks Wendy about it she becomes very agitated. Is Wendy hiding something? Chris has regained consciousness and Ormerod deduces that he has a form of heart arrhythmia and will need to be kept in hospital for more tests. Patrick reveals to Sarah his wife has been overprotective of Chris since their other son died of cot death ten years ago. This information sheds new light on Chris's case. Might his illness be linked to that of his late brother? In another part of the ward, Wendy's devoted husband Harry has come to visit her after her operation, but when Woods approaches him with the fishing hook that was stuck in his wife's foot, he looks puzzled. Harry does not fish and there is only one man he knows who does. As Wendy comes round, Harry storms out, believing she has betrayed him. Meanwhile, Jenny confirms she has sacked the cleaners after Adam questions her rationale, claiming it is unacceptable and irresponsible to expect the nurses to do the cleaning. Jenny seems confident she has done the right thing, but Adam is not convinced. Will Jenny prove him wrong? Sarah informs Chris's parents that his irregular heart rhythm is brought on by stress and exertion. She tells a distraught Patrick that marathon running is off the agenda for the time being. Kim is relieved when she discovers her baby died from the same condition ten years ago and she is not to blame for his death. Kim agrees with Patrick that they should stop arguing for the sake of Chris's health. In another part of the hospital, Norman has found Harry collapsed and in a critical condition after injecting himself with Wendy's insulin. The doctors manage to save him and as he recovers he tells Wendy he felt he had no choice and could not face life without her. Wendy is clearly distraught about her adultery and asserts it was a mistake and she has regretted it ever since. Will Harry be able to forgive his wife?" Note: 1.38m tuned in to this episode
Episode 9	17 January 2008 UK / 15 May 2009 Australia	9 (1x09)
It's "hernia day" at The Royal and everyone is dreading the sequence of grumpy old men who will be coming in for their operations. The first patient to arrive is Max, a smarmy nightclub promoter who instantly repels the female members of staff with his cheesy chat-up lines. He has a history of liver problems caused by excessive alcohol consumption, but vows he is a "good boy" now. However, Max proves to be a pest when he starts rowing with fellow patient evangelical Fred over his incessant hymn-singing, and Gemma catches him trying to drink some water when he is meant to be nil by mouth until his operation. When she takes the drink off him he sneakily goes to the toilet. Meanwhile, Norman has heard that Max is a big music promoter and abandons his duties to prepare a demo, leaving Kristaps on his own taking patients to theatre, much to the dismay of Woods who is consequently behind schedule and is going to be late for his golf tournament. In theatre, Alana is concerned when she notices Max's pulse and blood pressure are abnormal and immediately calls for a drug screening. The results come back and show Max has ecstasy in his system, but Woods is convinced there is something else. Max is sent straight to ICU while the nurses are told to search the ward again for any trace of drugs. Gemma remembers seeing Max going to the toilet and retraces his steps only to find a pill which turn outs to be an amphetamine usually used for narcolepsy. The team now knows how to treat him and as soon as Max is stable, Woods heads off for his golf tournament. As he leaves, he suggests that Matron investigate why a patient was able to "self medicate". Back on the ward, Norman arrives armed with his demo tape and persuades Pearl to introduce him to the patient who is into music. Pearl mistakenly thinks he is referring to hymn-singing Fred and leads Norman over to his bed. Fred is very pale and groggy post-operation, and after listening to Norman's music for a few minutes, the alarm sounds on his monitor and he falls unconscious. Was Norman's music really that bad? As Ormerod sees to Fred, he establishes he has internal bleeding after the operation and needs to go to theatre straight away. Much to his displeasure, Woods is called back to theatre and is forced to miss his golf match. Meanwhile, everyone is unhappy with Jenny for firing the cleaners, so when she rounds up the nurses and tries to lecture them about Max, Heather snipes back they were too busy cleaning to be able to watch his every move. As Jenny leaves, Heather complains that if Jenny carries on it will not just be new cleaners she will be looking for. Will Matron ever win the nurses over? Note: 1.31m tuned in to this episode
Episode 10	18 January 2008 UK / 18 May 2009 Australia	10 (1x10)
The first patient of the day is Geoff Witter, a mountain of a man who has been suffering from constipation. Woods demands an X-ray when he realises Geoff's problem could be more serious. When the X-rays come back, they reveal Geoff has a knot in his bowel and needs to go straight to theatre. Meanwhile, Adam is fed up with working under Jenny's management, particularly as he has had to stay late to finish off the cleaning. At the end of his tether, he has decided to apply for a Matron position at another hospital. Jenny asserts she does not want to lose Adam, but he is not convinced. Will he leave The Royal? And how will Heather feel when he tells her he is thinking of relocating? In A&E, the paramedics have rushed in with Robert Barry, a bridegroom dressed in his morning suit who is admitted after being picked up in the street with severe breathing difficulties. Sarah and Kieran manage to help him breathing on his own, but when he finally comes round he is devastated, as he has missed his wedding. Sarah explains his condition is still quite serious and he needs to stay in hospital, but Robert seems more concerned about screwing up the big day. However, his fears about ruining the wedding are justified when his bride Edina storms onto the ward and pours a jug of water over his head. Norman has been busy making music CDs for Ormerod and Carrie, but is horrified when he realises he has accidentally given Ormerod Carrie's gangster rap music to take to his daughter's party. Despite the absence of a maternity ward at The Royal, Jenny and Adam are forced to assist a young couple, Carl and Michelle, who arrive ready to give birth. However, complications arise when Jenny realises the umbilical cord is wrapped around the baby's neck. Will the baby be okay? Will Jenny and Adam be able to work together? Elsewhere, Sarah's shocked when a disappointed Ormerod returns to The Royal, having been unable to make it to his daughter's party. With his family life in tatters, will Sarah be his shoulder to cry on? Back on Middleditch Ward, Edina has calmed down and decided to bring the party to Robert. As the nurses join them in cracking open a bottle of bubbly and eating wedding cake, Carrie tells everyone she has been given tickets to a glamorous Champagne gala by her patient Geoff. She invites Adam and Heather to join her. Note: 1.30m tuned in to this episode
Episode 11	21 January 2008 UK / 19 May 2009 Australia	11 (1x11)
As Norman and Heather approach the entrance of the hospital, Norman makes it clear to his sister he does not think Adam is the right man for her. Heather suggests Norman is jealous and storms off, leaving him disgruntled. He is quick to put on a more jovial front when a 60-year-old grandmother, Eunice Hall, wobbles towards the hospital, helped by her daughter Grace. Norman rushes to her aid, and turns on the charm. Once inside the hospital, Dr Sarah Chatwin tends to Eunice, and Grace looks guilty as she confesses her mother had a fall earlier in the week. Eunice is concerned she is a burden to Grace, but Sarah insists they run some tests. Dr Ormerod later assesses Eunice and decides a CT scan and blood tests are needed. Grace stands by in horror. Meanwhile, 22-year-old Darrell Watts is having a pre-op assessment with Alana. He is in for a circumcision, having had problems over the years. As Gemma makes Darrell's bed, she finds an empty crisp packet. He insists he knows nothing about it, but as he is nil by mouth, Gemma cannot help worrying. She wonders whether to tell someone, but before she knows it, Darrell has gone to theatre. In radiology, Vijay flirts with Sarah, discussing the merits of bikini waxing. Sarah sarcastically reminds him he should be looking at Mrs Hall's CT scan and he confirms she has the all clear. As Sarah goes to leave, Vijay asks if she fancies a bite to eat later. She replies saying she definitely would, but not with him. Vijay takes the put down in good spirits. In the anaesthetic room, Alana prepares an injection for Darrell and notes that Isla is in a foul mood. As Woods enters to perform the operation, Gemma runs in demanding they stop. Woods is clearly unimpressed, but has she got to them in time? Sarah and Ormerod are on their lunch break eating sandwiches in the sunshine and taking in the view over the bay. Ormerod tells Sarah he never tires of the view, and he has been looking at it for more than thirty years. He talks of his father, who worked in the same hospital many years ago and gave Jonathan very useful advice. He told him to talk to the patients, as they usually know more than they think. As a consequence, Ormerod suggests they go and talk to Mrs Hall. Ormerod discreetly quizzes Eunice and, as she opens up to him, he learns she has been taking librium since the death of her husband five years ago. Shortly afterwards, Grace arrives with her husband and their two teenage sons. Eunice's son-in-law laughs and says Grace has been drinking all of their grapefruit juice, as she loves the stuff. Sarah and Ormerod share a glance. They later explain to Eunice that grapefruit juice reacts against the librium and has been making her ill. The solution is simple – stop taking the drugs or stop drinking the juice. Meanwhile, Alana attempts to get to the bottom of what is troubling Isla and, as they go for a walk, Isla confesses she is worried about her marriage. She has been with Terry for 24 years, but she is concerned having found a text on his phone saying "Sweet dreams, Debbie xxx". Alana advises Isla to look at his phone again tonight. It is the only way she will get to the bottom of what is going on. Isla hopes this will put her mind at rest, but will it give her more cause for concern? Note: 1.24m tuned in to this episode
Episode 12	22 January 2008 UK / 20 May 2009 Australia	12 (1x12)
Gemma amorously eyes up Kieran as he deals with his 58-year-old patient, Fr Alvin Peters. A friend of Father Peters has found him lying in the cemetery and believes he has been mugged. Ormerod takes a closer look at Alvin and notes he has taken quite a knock to his head. Alvin tells him he was out taking a stroll and suddenly, whack. He remembers very little. Kieran notices some older bruises on Alvin's shoulder, but when he questions how they got there, Alvin claims they happened during the attack. Kieran is clearly suspicious. In casualty, Carrie takes 39-year-old Mary's blood pressure, which is 220/130, which Dr Sarah Chatwin understates as "rather on the high side" (whereas it is a hypertensive crisis). Mary is gasping for breath while holding her chest and Kieran gives her some oxygen. Dr Chatwin explains to Mary that her heart rhythm is still a little fast and asks if she has been feeling anxious recently. As they try to get to the bottom of what has caused the attack, Mary's partner arrives, a 35-year-old man called Kim. Kim explains they have had a difficult year, which has been stressful for Mary. Sarah suspects Mary has been suffering from panic attacks and, having talked through the condition, Mary and Kim make to leave. Just as Mary puts on her jacket, she tilts her head to one side and Sarah notices a scar on her neck. Mary explains it is from an operation a few years ago. Why does Sarah look so concerned? Note: 1.18m tuned in to this episode
Episode 13	23 January 2008 UK / 21 May 2009 Australia	13 (1x13)
A jumpy 22-year-old woman, Helen Travers, sits in casualty with a nasty cut on her arm. Helen tells Kieran and Ormerod she sustained the injuries from a broken glass, but Ormerod is clearly concerned when he notices scarring from older cuts on her arm. It appears she is a drug addict and has been self harming. In a separate cubicle, Sarah, Heather and Gemma are treating 23-year-old Liam Dooley, a cannabis user who is finding it difficult to breathe. Pamela arrives and after a brief examination she announces they need to operate immediately. As Pamela, Alana, Isla and Woods prepare to operate on Liam, Pamela complains she is having a hard time at the moment, as her cheques are bouncing. Isla also looks like a wet weekend and Woods asks Pamela whether Isla is all right. Pamela is uninterested, being concerned with problems of her, but Alana later tells Woods Isla's husband has left her. Woods is unusually nice to Isla, which renders her astonished. Note: 1.23m tuned in to this episode
Episode 14	24 January 2008 UK / 22 May 2009 Australia	14 (1x14)
Ormerod walks down the corridor with Sarah and groans when he sees a familiar couple walking towards him. He tells Sarah middle-aged Kate Danson suffered from gallstones, but since he treated her she bugs him constantly. Ever professional, he sees to Kate, but gives her the all clear. As she leaves, Peter asks her to stop embarrassing him, insisting there is nothing wrong with her and that anyone would think she wants to be ill. As Peter storms off, Kate heads back to the ward and tells Ormerod she is convinced she has a condition called myasthenia gravis, which she has researched on the internet. Feeling uncomfortable, Ormerod goes to find Sarah and discovers Peter in the waiting room. Peter apologises, telling Ormerod Kate is besotted with him and that is why she is finding excuses to come to the hospital. Ormerod does not want to encourage Kate, but Sarah insists he has to do a blood test, as it is the only way to be sure. In casualty, Kieran tends to Des, a scaffolder who has fallen off his scaffolding and landed in a skip. Sarah is concerned when he says he felt dizzy before the fall, and is worried he passed out. Sarah asks Ormerod to take a look at her patient and he suggests routine scans and X-rays. Des is happy to stick around for the tests, as long as Pearl is present. It seems he has taken quite a shine to her. Note: 1.12m tuned in to this episode
Episode 15	25 January 2008 UK / 25 May 2009 Australia	15 (1x15)
Dr Sarah Chatwin has been treating 76-year-old William Brazier for back pain and kidney stones. He is grateful for her support, but the mild-mannered man seems to become a little less cheery when his wife Janet appears and it is not long before the couple start bickering. William seems to perk up when he is taken to radiology, but is concerned when Vijay stops the ultrasound midway through. Vijay has spotted that William's abdominal aortic aneurysm has increased vastly in size and insists he has surgery immediately. Back on the ward, Pamela and Sarah prepare William for surgery and Adam convinces him that he will be back in no time. There is fear in William's eyes as he asks to see his wife, suddenly realising how important she is to him. Before there is time for William to see Janet properly, he is wheeled into the lift. Inside with Sarah, Pamela, Alana and Kristaps, the lift suddenly judders. With the lift stuck containing a man that needs immediate surgery, there is utter panic. After a number of attempts to get the lift moving and to get the doors apart, they are left with one option – they will have to carry out the operation in the lift. William's condition goes down rapidly. Pamela operates and Woods talks her through it. Pamela clamps the aorta when the lift starts working again. Woods and Pamela rush William into theatre and the operation is a success. Note: 1.03m tuned in to this episode
Episode 16	28 January 2008 UK / 26 May 2009 Australia	16 (1x16)
Alana, Pamela and Sarah reach the end of their morning exercise session and Sarah is far from impressed when Alana says she has entered them for a county triathlon. In casualty, Ormerod is seeing to Alison, a mother in her mid-thirties, who has been suffering from irregular breathing. As Ormerod plans to run some tests, Kieran volunteers Gemma to look after her two children. Kieran is amused as Gemma is clearly annoyed with him. Over at the nurses' station, Vijay wonders what Kieran has that he has not. Adam points out that all women seem to fall at Kieran's feet and Pearl and Heather agree he is a good catch. Back in casualty, a pair of young ice skaters, Felix and Mimi, are looking very forlorn. Felix is devastated as he has accidentally whacked Mimi in the face on the day of the qualifiers. She needs stitches to heal the wound, but she has also landed badly and has hurt her knee. Woods delivers a further blow to the skaters when he tells them that Mimi needs surgery and will not be fit in time for the championships in two weeks. Just as Mimi is about to go to surgery, another couple of skaters, Jack and Natalie, arrive. Natalie is Mimi's sister, and Jack and Felix are brothers. When Mimi's operation is over, Natalie suggests she should dump Jack and partner up with Felix as she is certain they would have more chance of winning the championships. How will Mimi feel about her sister taking her place in the tournament? In a consulting room, Sarah and Ormerod break the news to Alison's partner, Tim, that she has lung cancer. The disease has spread to Alison's spine, so unfortunately surgery is not an option. Tim struggles to take in the news, but insists he will pull himself together to tell Alison himself. However, before he plucks up the courage, Alison guesses she has cancer and asks Sarah outright. Sarah is forced to confirm her fears and Alison is furious that Tim did not tell her sooner. Tim is equally as angry with Sarah for telling Alison before he had had time to compose himself. Gemma is busy looking after Alison's children and Vijay comments that having children suits her. He jokingly asks when she is marrying Kieran and, when she says they just had a bit of fun, Vijay takes it as a green light to ask her out. With the kids running riot, Gemma is forced to say yes to Vijay just to get rid of him. As Alison and Tim struggle to come to terms with their news, Heather takes over looking after the kids. Adam panics when Pearl comments that Heather is looking broody, as he is clearly not planning on having children in the near future. The future for Alison and Tim, on the other hand, is suddenly in sharp focus, and as Tim gets down on one knee and asks Alison to marry him, she proudly accepts. As the day closes, Pamela and Sarah are heading home and Sarah groans about the triathlon. Jenny overhears and offers to take her place. Pamela clearly does not want Matron on the team and the pair of them scarper. In the pub, Vijay suggests that he and Gemma cut to the chase and go back to his house. Gemma is appalled that he thinks she is that easy and tells him to get lost. Note: 1.09m tuned in to this episode
Episode 17	29 January 2008 UK / 27 May 2009 Australia	17 (1x17)
Carrie is treating lecherous kidney patient Rob Hill, and she complains to Gemma about his behaviour towards her. Gemma tops it by revealing that Vijay expected her to sleep with him last night, and swears to teach him a lesson. In casualty, Ormerod and Sarah tend to Lee, a 19-year-old who has blood in his urine. His drama student girlfriend does not help by suggesting he has something awful such as cancer. After various tests, Ormerod and Sarah struggle to reach a diagnosis. What could be wrong with the sporty young lad? Meanwhile, Heather seems to be analysing her relationship with Adam leaving him bemused as to why she suddenly feels the need to make improvements. Jenny comes over and Heather quizzes her about her past. Jenny admits that she has never been married and thinks it is unlikely she will find a suitable partner now. Heather then moves on to quiz Sarah and Ormerod about their thoughts on marriage and discovers that Ormerod met his wife at work; she used to be his registrar. This is clearly news to a shocked Sarah. Elsewhere is the hospital, Gemma finds Vijay and flirtatiously suggests they make up for last night. She arranges to meet him in the call room and when he arrives she pulls him in seductively by the tie. She strips him down to his underpants and proceeds to blindfold the excitable radiographer. Unbeknown to him, Gemma takes out her phone and photographs the somewhat vulnerable Vijay before picking up his clothes and rushing away. Vijay is left standing blindfolded in his Y fronts. Back in casualty, Sarah and Ormerod are still struggling to get to the bottom of what is wrong with Lee, but eventually, with his girlfriend out of sight, Lee confesses that he went skinny dipping in Lake Malawi in Africa. Could he have picked up a nasty illness from the water? And can he keep his antics quiet from his girlfriend? In radiology, Vijay is back from his ordeal with Gemma and is now examining Rob. Suddenly, Rob struggles to breathe. Alana and Ormerod rush in. Rob's heart fails and they have to shock him to get it beating again. When he comes round, they explain that he must have an allergy, and his wife suggests that she plans to sue the hospital for nearly killing him. An angry Adam, who has been observing the way Rob treated Carrie, steps in and asks Mrs Hill to explain why her husband has been sexually harassing his staff. Will this be enough to hush Rob's stunned wife? As the shift closes, Sarah and Ormerod seem pleased with their day's work and agree to head out for a meal. Sarah is clearly chuffed. Is romance blossoming? Note: 1.16m tuned in to this episode
Episode 18	30 January 2008 UK / 28 May 2009 Australia	18 (1x18)
Ormerod confides in Woods. During a fitness session, Alana and Pamela quiz Sarah about her relationship with Ormerod. Sarah chooses to tell them very little, but it does not stop Alana and Pamela gossiping. Meanwhile, Carrie seems low and tells Gemma that she is not enjoying her job. To make matters worse, one of the elderly patients dies and Carrie is asked to wash her. Carrie is horrified and realises nursing is not what she had expected. She tells Jenny that she wants to leave, but Jenny convinces her to give it a week and then make a decision. Will Carrie change her mind or will she really leave the hospital for ever? In the examination room, Sarah tends to sixty-year-old Elizabeth who has cut her hand badly after falling into the coffee table. Elizabeth's daughter, Briony, voices her concerns to Sarah, telling her that her mother keeps losing her balance. The sweet lady asks if she can have a snack and gets out a Tupperware box containing what look like chocolate brownies and starts tucking in. Will Sarah realise the cakes actually contain cannabis? In casualty, Ormerod and Kieran care for a young Bulgarian man in his twenties who was found injured in the road. Ivan insists he cannot remember what happened and is desperate to leave saying he has work to do. Ivan becomes more adamant that he must go, telling Kristaps it is a matter of life and death. Ivan then confides in Kristaps that his wife has been forced into prostitution. Ivan tried to save her, but he was thrown out and dumped into the road. Ivan is worried about what is happening to his wife, but cannot go to the police in fear of being deported. Kristaps reluctantly agrees to let Ivan go, telling him that he must return for his treatment. Ormerod returns and is horrified to discover Ivan has gone. Test results show that he has TB and it is essential he is found quickly. Will Kristaps confess to letting his patient leave? And will Ivan return in one piece? Meanwhile, Adam jokes that he thinks marriage is a waste of time, leaving Heather slightly concerned. She gently probes him, but she does not get the response she wants, as he says he believes in keeping your options open. Elsewhere, Woods tells Ormerod that he has heard things are not well at home. Ormerod is taken aback when Woods offers a sympathetic ear and a stiff drink. It seems Woods has a heart after all. Note: 1.09m tuned in to this episode
Episode 19	31 January 2008 UK / 29 May 2009 Australia	19 (1x19)
Heather hopes to marry Adam. Celebrity chef Graham Griffin is admitted to The Royal with breathlessness and chest pain. His timid assistant, Antonia, accompanies him as Sarah and Kieran investigate his condition. After further analysis, Sarah tells Graham that she suspects he has a blood clot and will need to stay in for a CT scan and thinning of the blood. The obnoxious chef insists he must get back to his kitchen, but eventually he reluctantly sends Antonia to the restaurant, insisting that she must not mess up, as he has heard a reviewer is visiting the restaurant this evening. Elsewhere in the hospital, Carrie tells Jenny that she has had time to think and, despite her reservations, she wants to continue as a nurse. Jenny is thrilled and, her mood lifted, she starts to make conversation with Ormerod and invites him out at the weekend. The shocked doctor is saved by his bleeper. Meanwhile, Alana and Pamela have been listening and are stunned by Jenny's brass neck. In casualty, Ormerod has started to treat Derek, a man in his mid-forties who is suffering from asthma. As Ormerod leaves, Kieran realises that Derek has been hiding something – a rash on his hand. What could the red blotches be, and what has Derek got to hide? In the kitchen on her break, Heather flicks through a bridal magazine and reveals to Pearl that she hopes to change Adam's opinion of marriage. Heather admits she does not want to scare him off, so she needs to be subtly persuasive. What does she have in mind, and is it likely to change Adam's rather strong opinion? Meanwhile, Norman rushes through the corridor with a serious casualty in tow. It is Antonia lying on the trolley and her chef's whites are covered in blood. An enormous chef's knife is sticking out of her chest, close to her heart. As Pamela and Kieran examine Antonia, they are shocked when she tells them that she fell onto the knife as it stuck upright in a dishwasher. Woods has to operate, but Antonia's biggest concern is that Graham's precious knife is not damaged. After surgery, Woods sarcastically returns the knife to Antonia's aggressive boss. How will the celebrity chef react when he hears about her horrific accident? Note: 1.15m tuned in to this episode
Episode 20	1 February 2008 UK / 1 June 2009 Australia	20 (1x20)
Heather proposes to Adam. Jenny calls a meeting and tells the staff a prisoner, Aidan, is due to be admitted today for a bowel resection. He will be accompanied by two prison officers. Carrie feels uneasy, particularly as they are told that they are not allowed to ask him or the officers about the crime he committed. Gemma seems intrigued by him, especially when he turns out to be a good looking man in his early thirties who insists on telling her she is gorgeous. Adam is clearly unimpressed by Gemma's flirting, but matters take a dramatic turn when a journalist arrives saying that she has heard a convicted child killer has been admitted to the ward. The entire medical team is horrified to discover the truth about Aidan, but Pearl seems particularly venomous towards him, hoping he dies. Why does Pearl have such strong views? As Adam confronts her, she tells him her deepest and darkest secret. What could be in Pearl's past that is so distressing? In casualty, Kieran sees to a drowsy patient, Laura. She is accompanied by Andrew who tells Kieran that Laura is an epileptic. There is definite tension in the air and Andrew later tells Kieran they split up a couple of weeks ago. Andrew goes away to collect Laura's belongings and when he returns, the very sight of him sends her into a fit. Ormerod discovers that Laura's fits are directly related to the emotional stress of her break up. This revelation leaves Andrew feeling trapped, but will Laura let him go? Elsewhere, Ormerod tells Sarah that Woods has taken him under his wing. He says that he has agreed to a trip on his yacht this weekend, but is worried because he suffers from sea sickness. Sarah is highly amused and is later very happy when Ormerod asks her out. Could Sarah finally be getting her man? Meanwhile, Heather is fed up, as Adam has not picked up on any of her hints about marriage, so eventually, bolstered by Pearl, proposes to him. Adam accepts, but is it what he really wants? Note: 1.25m tuned in to this episode
Episode 21	4 February 2008 UK / 2 June 2009 Australia	21 (1x21)
Carrie's becomes upset with Gemma. Norman's unhappy about Adam marrying his sister and claims that Heather can do better, but it is clear that he is more worried that once they are officially married he will have his nose pushed out. However, Norman is not the only who has reservations about the marriage. Heather is worried about whether she has done the right thing by proposing and confesses to Pearl that Adam has gone quiet since she asked him. Is Heather right to be paranoid? In casualty, Louisa Matthews and her nerdy boyfriend arrive in casualty. She is hyperventilating and has a rash on her arm, but when Ormerod asks what she was doing when the rash developed she and Malcolm look bashful and ashamed. After much persuading, they eventually confess to Ormerod that they were about to consummate their relationship and lose their virginities. As the rash begins to spread, Malcolm is crestfallen, convinced that he is the cause of rash. However, when Ormerod reveals that it is latex she is allergic to, Malcolm is relieved to discover that not all forms of contraception are made from it and they can still have sex. Elsewhere, Sarah is surprised to learn that Ormerod has not told her that his wife and children have moved back, while Carrie is upset when Gemma patronises her after finding out she is still a virgin and decides to take things into her own hands by asking Kieran out once and for all, but will she be able to gather the courage to go through with it? Meanwhile, Casualty is inundated with students from the university, when Andrew, Raymond, and Paul all arrive separately with various serious injuries. Pamela is seeing to Andrew, who fractured his pelvis when he fell twenty feet from the roof of his halls, and is shocked when Raymond arrives unconscious with their tutor James, who claims Ray has been injured in a rugby tackle. However, the doctors are surprised when Raymond regains consciousness and says that he fell down the stairs. Paul is last to arrive and is the most seriously injured – he has been found electrocuted on a railway line and the team is unable to resuscitate him. When Kieran discovers that Paul was also from James's class, he is suspicious. Can it just be a coincidence that three students from one class have been seriously hurt in one day? Ex–marine turned university tutor James is clearly disturbed by the news that Paul has died and seems uneasy when Kieran questions him about the confusion over how Raymond was injured. When he speaks to Andrew, he fails to mention Paul's death and asks him not to mention that the three boys were taking part in a game organised by himself. However, when Kieran and Pamela break the tragic news to Andrew and Ray, they are devastated and reveal that James was asked to leave the marines for being a bully and he was the one who facilitated and encouraged the Dare Day, which involves students climbing to the highest point and initialling it. James denies the allegations, but as the police arrive on the ward, he realises he has a lot of explaining to do. Note: 1.10m tuned in to this episode
Episode 22	5 February 2008 UK / 3 June 2009 Australia	22 (1x22)
Vijay tries to dig some dirt on Gemma. Peter Glade, his brother Ian and wife Diane arrive at the Royal after being involved in a car accident. Nobody appears seriously injured but when Vijay blurts out that Diane's scan shows she is pregnant, everyone is shocked, as Peter reveals that he cannot produce sperm, so the baby cannot be his. As Sarah berates Vijay for breaking patient confidentiality, Peter demands to know who has impregnated his wife and is stunned to discover that it is his brother. Peter is livid, but feels torn when Ian explains that Diane had asked him to be sperm donor so that she and Peter could have a child from the same gene pool. Will Peter be able to get over this deception and be thankful that he has the child he has always wanted? Elsewhere, Carrie is cheered when Gemma reassures her that her fling with Kieran was just a bit of fun and he is still available. However, she decides that if he really does like her he can do all the chasing. Will Kieran fall for Carrie? Meanwhile, in the theatre corridor, handsome theatre assistant David is flirting with Isla as he shows her the new hospital system. Alana notes this attraction and thinks she is helping when she informs David that she is now single after separating from her husband. Encouraged by this news, David invites Isla for a coffee but is left feeling awkward when she denies being single and separated. Isla is furious by Alana's interference and retorts that her marriage is her business alone. Vijay tells Adam that he has arranged a date with a college friend of Gemma in order to get some dirt on her to get his own back. How will Gemma feel when she discovers Vijay has been prying into her past? On the male ward, Norman's brass band conductor Fred has been admitted with emphysema and Norman is devastated when he discovers it is terminal and he will not be able to attend his own surprise retirement party. Determined to make Fred's last days happy, the staff get together and arrange for Fred's brass band to come to The Royal for a farewell concert. As Ormerod wheels Fred outside, he tearfully conducts his band for one last time. Note: 1.30m tuned in to this episode
Episode 23	6 February 2008 UK / 4 June 2009 Australia	23 (1x23)
Isla is unsure about David. It is St Aidan's five-a-side football final and everyone is looking forward to watching the big match, but when 18-year-old Nathan is brought in to The Royal after a hit and run accident in which his leg has been crushed, any plans to watch the game are put on hold. As Ormerod and Sarah examine an incubated Nathan, Kieran realises he is the striker who plays for their rivals – Elsinby – and he is a brilliant player. However, it looks as though his football career is going to be cut short when Pamela declares that his foot is dead and they need to operate immediately to save what is left of his leg. In theatre, Nathan's situation becomes critical when he goes into arrest. The team manages to bring him back, but lose the battle to save his leg and are forced to amputate below the knee. Meanwhile, as Nathan's dad waits for news of the operation he tells Jenny how his son lived to play football and is stunned when Pamela and Woods inform him that they have had to amputate and he will never be able to play football again. Later, with Woods' help, Glynn manages to break the shattering news to his son, who is devastated and Glynn vows that he will catch the man who did this to him and make him pay. Meanwhile, in casualty, Sarah is seeing to Lee Sorter, a belligerent patient who has also been in a car crash with his girlfriend Marcia. Lee is busy sleazing over the nurses and is uninterested when Adam explains that Marcia has a ruptured spleen and will be undergoing surgery. When Lee does finally visit Marcia, he informs her that he has lied and said that she was driving the car so as not to get himself in trouble with the police again. He persuades his frightened girlfriend to keep her mouth shut. Sarah is not convinced by Lee's story and confronts Marcia who finally confesses and agrees to speak to the police. Meanwhile, Glynn has recognised Lee as the man who mowed down his son and immediately sets out to seek revenge. Elsewhere, Isla is still annoyed with Alana over David, but admits that after being out of the dating game for 24 years she just panicked when she realised he was going to ask her out but she does actually like him. However, when David approaches her later that day she gets cold feet again and runs away. Alana urges him not to give up on her and when he sees Isla again he assures her that "it's just a drink", but Isla is unsure. Is she ready to start dating again? Back in the kitchen, Lee is cowering on the floor as Glynn threatens to carry out his punishment. He is about to pummel him when Ormerod and Sarah burst in and manage to dissuade him from taking action, by assuring him that the police are on their way and Lee will be going back to prison. Note: 1.06m tuned in to this episode
Episode 24	7 February 2008 UK / 5 June 2009 Australia	24 (1x24)
An exotic dancer descends on The Royal. It is chaos at The Royal as all the computers are down and everyone is angry with Jenny because her new system is messing up their schedules. Woods loses his patience and rants down the phone to the fraught Matron, who hangs up on him finding it all too much. Woods confronts Matron about the flaws in her ward management but when she challenges his accusations that she cannot do her job properly he is not prepared to listen. Still smarting from her run in with Woods, Jenny cranks up the pressure on the wards and after witnessing another unprofessional incident involving Gemma, she gives her an official warning. Can Jenny cope with the demands of her role and will she prove her worth to cynical Woods? Meanwhile, Vijay has some dirt on Gemma, and plans to reveal it publicly to get his own back on her. Kieran warns Gemma and is surprised when she seems unconcerned and rises to the challenge, unafraid of whatever Vijay might reveal. In casualty, Rachel Jones arrives with her husband, Liam, and their angry daughter, Serena. Liam claims that Rachel is the victim of a mugging attack and is anxious when Ormerod reveals she has a ruptured bladder and rushes his wife to theatre. Is all as it seems? Vijay is stumped when he presents the staff with a photo of Gemma pole dancing and she declares that she loves the picture and unashamedly admits that she did it to make money at college. On the female ward, an exotic dancer called Alison has arrived dressed in a sexy rubber latex nurse's outfit. Her stomach has swollen up mid-act so she is stuck in her costume and when Sarah confirms that she has coeliac disease and needs to have a bowel biopsy, Alison's adamant that the nurses do not cut the expensive costume off her. However, when Matron reveals that Alison's husband is on his way she is desperate to get out of the latex PVC suit, as he does not know how she has been earning her money. When John arrives, he is stunned to find Alison fully clad as a stripper and tries to control his temper as he tells the embarrassed nurses to throw the costume in the bin. She had told him she was temping but seeing as he is a stripper, too, she claims she has done nothing wrong. Later, when John overhears Vijay commenting on Gemma's stripper past, he assumes he is talking about Alison and attacks him. He eventually calms down enough to speak to his wife and is pleased to learn that she cannot stand the idea of women gawping at him. It is a happy ending as the couple agree that they will both stop stripping but do not need to throw away their costumes. Meanwhile, in theatre, the team working on Rachel suspects she is a victim of domestic abuse; Ormerod speaks to Serena about her home life but she will not reveal anything. As a nervous Liam enters, she reassures him that she has not told them anything. What is Liam hiding and how long will it be until they find out? Later, when Woods spots Liam's wounded knuckles, Rachel and Liam are uneasy; they are desperate to leave The Royal fearing that the staff are asking too many questions. However, when Ormerod, Sarah and Pamela witness Serena lashing out at her parents, they run in, but are shocked when Serena slaps Sarah. Rachel reveals that Liam has not hurt anyone; it is Serena who has been abusing them, and they cannot control her. They are both teachers and do not want to lose their jobs or their daughter. Although Ormerod sympathises with the failed parents on a personal level, he has no choice but to get social services involved. Note: 1.08m tuned in to this episode
Episode 25	8 February 2008 UK / 8 June 2009 Australia	25 (1x25)
Gemma's furious with Jenny. Ormerod is tending to Cathy, a regular patient who is an alcoholic and is admitted to the Royal on an almost weekly basis owing to various injuries incurred while inebriated. Sarah is unsympathetic claiming that her pain is self-inflicted and is not impressed when Ormerod makes light of Cathy's problem. When tests reveal that she has a perforated ulcer and needs to have surgery as soon as possible, Cathy seems unconcerned and has no will to live. Meanwhile, a vomiting mum, Anna, and her two children, Sam and Lucy, are admitted to casualty with possible food poisoning and Ormerod immediately suspects they have been poisoned by mistletoe berries found in the garden. Anna is adamant that they have not been eating poisonous berries but when her husband, Jason, rushes in looking for his kids and accuses Anna of poisoning them everyone is shocked. He explains to the doctors that since he split up with his wife, she has been feigning illnesses as a means of getting his attention. He does not trust her and does not want her anywhere near his children – she is not stable and he is not sure how far she will go to get him back in her life. Cathy reveals to Isla that she has not always been a drunkard – she used to lead a respectable life and ran an accountancy company with her husband, but when he died her world fell apart. She turned to drink to numb her pain, as she cannot live without him. As Cathy comes round from her operation, Woods tells her that, if she continues to abuse her body, she will never escape this vicious cycle. As Isla reassures her that she understands how it feels suddenly to be alone and how frightening it is, Cathy's monitor flatlines. Isla calls for emergency assistance but the team is unable to save Cathy and, as Isla reflects on the situation, she comments that Cathy looks content at last; she finally got what she wanted – to be with her husband. Back in casualty, Sarah questions Anna about the possibility that she did poison her own children and, despite Anna's heartfelt protestations, Sarah is not convinced. However, when Kieran spots Sam putting some berries in the dustbin it becomes clear who is to blame. Sam admits that he poisoned his mum and sister in order to get his dad to come home – he only ever seems to visit them when they are sick. Jason feels guilty and although he resists getting back together, he agrees that he still has a duty to be a father to his children. Elsewhere, Gemma is still furious that Jenny has given her an oral warning and is affronted when she tells her to drop the attitude. Vijay feels terrible when he learns that she is in trouble but his attempt to make amends with a bunch of flowers seems to put a smile on her face after a stressful day. Meanwhile, Heather is upset that Norman refuses to be enthusiastic about the wedding. When Adam assures him that he does truly love his sister and has not been pushed into marriage, Norman is assuaged. He apologises to his sister, and Adam and Heather do seem genuinely happy as they talk about the prospect of married life. Note: 1.07m tuned in to this episode
Episode 26	11 February 2008 UK / 9 June 2009 Australia	26 (1x26)
Alana is worried by the team. Seventeen-year-old model Zara Redman is rushed into casualty, dressed as a Vegas showgirl, with severe pains in her stomach. As Sarah and Ormerod examine Zara, they realise she has something blocking her bowels. Her mother, Jane, tells Sarah that she has not been eating, as she is under pressure to be like the size-zero models in all the magazines; she has been modelling since she was six years old. As Carrie speaks to Zara, she becomes concerned that she may have an eating disorder and tries to coax her into admitting the truth by revealing she used to starve herself. She finally gets her to open up and is furious when she discovers that Jane knows all about her eating disorder and has been assisting Zara in eating nothing but vitamins and tissues for the last two weeks. Ormerod condemns Jane for allowing Zara to risk her life for the sake of her looks, and Jane confesses that she used to be a model herself but stopped getting jobs when she put weight on – she did not want the same to happen to her daughter. Realising she has been totally irresponsible, Jane vows to make a fresh start and help her daughter lead a healthy life. Meanwhile, Barbara and Greg have been admitted to casualty following a car accident. Barbara has cracked a rib and, when the doctors discover she has internal injuries, she is taken to surgery. Meanwhile, Greg seems uneasy when his daughter Louise arrives and, when Ormerod informs Louise that her mother is doing fine, he is confused as Louise's mum, Janette, walks in. Louise is furious with her dad, as this is not the first affair he has had, and when they discover who his mystery lady is, they are shocked – Barbara is Janette's best friend. Greg reveals to Adam that he has always loved Barbara and married the wrong woman – he is convinced that Barbara will want to be with him now that it is all out in the open. Janette is sick of being humiliated by her husband and attacks him on the ward. In the locker room, Gemma confides in Carrie that her period is late and, when her pregnancy test comes back positive, she realises she is carrying Kieran's baby, but decides not to tell him anything. However, Kieran quizzes Carrie when he notices Gemma is avoiding him and she unintentionally says more than she should. Later, when Gemma reveals to Carrie that she is going to make an appointment with her doctor to have an abortion, and no one will be any the wiser, it is clear she is worried that Kieran knows Gemma's secret. How will Kieran take the news? In the recovery room, Barbara's husband Colin has arrived and is devastated that she has been unfaithful. Barbara explains that she has made a huge mistake, she regrets the affair and begs Colin to forgive her – she loves him and not Greg. Angry, Colin confronts two-timing Greg and asserts that Barbara does not love him and never has. Fuming, Greg is left all alone as Colin reminds him that his wife and daughter want nothing to do with him, either. Meanwhile, it is Alana's 40th birthday at the end of the week and, as the surgeons ask whether she feels she has achieved all she had wanted to, they remind a concerned Alana that her biological clock is ticking if she wants to have kids. They try to persuade her to have a 40th party but she is not amused. Note: 0.87m tuned in to this episode
Episode 27	12 February 2008 UK / 10 June 2009 Australia	27 (1x27)
Sarah confronts Ormerod. Steve Lewin has been admitted to The Royal covered in blood after falling victim to a homophobic attack. He had been "cruising" in a well known spot on the beach when he was attacked. Adam warns him about putting himself in dangerous situations at the seafront, but when Steve becomes very defensive, Adam is worried he may think he is a homophobe. Has Adam offended Steve? Meanwhile, Gemma has decided she does not want Kieran to find out about the baby and tells a worried Carrie that she has no intention of telling him the news. Feeling nervous – Carrie rushes over to try to persuade Kieran not to confront Gemma about the pregnancy and implores Gemma to try to consider all of her options. Dale Thomason is rushed into casualty with a shotgun. He is soaked in blood and crying out in pain as his distressed granddad Charlie runs alongside the trolley. Dale is in great pain, as he is prepped for surgery and Charlie is convinced it is his fault – they have had eight burglaries at their farm in the past four months and this time they had a gun. As Charlie explains, Dale passes out. Meanwhile, Ormerod is in a terrible mood and snaps at Kieran when he asks for advice about women, telling him to steer clear – they are not worth the hassle. After he snaps at yet another patient, Sarah has had enough and confronts him about his strange behaviour. Ormerod admits he is having problems at home again. Will Sarah be his shoulder to cry on? Elsewhere, Adam asks Steve whether he thinks he is a homophobe and Steve admits that he has started to get really paranoid that everyone is out to get him because of his sexuality. Since his partner died, he has had to look elsewhere for comfort and cruising seemed the only option. In theatre, Dale's condition is a lot worse than the doctors had anticipated and, as Dale's mum Carol questions Charlie about the burglar, Charlie finally cracks and confesses that he was the one who shot Dale. It was an accident – Dale had been out and forgotten his key. When Charlie saw a dark figure climbing through the window, he assumed he was a burglar. Carol is furious with her father and calls the police to have him arrested, leaving Charlie in turmoil. Back in theatre, Dale's internal organs are too badly damaged and the doctors are unable to save him. Charlie breaks down in floods of tears as Carol takes her grief out on him. The doctors calm Carol down and, when Jenny asks her whether Dale would have wanted to see her at war with Charlie, she decides to forgive her father and they are united in grief. Bright and bubbly, Andrea Watson is in her twenties and has been on a raucous girls' night out for her friend's birthday. She has been admitted to The Royal with a wound on her back after jumping off the pier for a dare. Andrea appears to be a bit of a rebel and when she notices Pearl's nicotine patch, she urges her not to give up smoking and surrender to the ban – Andrea feels that smoking is one of the few pleasures she has left and she is not prepared to give it up. Pearl decides to have a sneaky cigarette. However, when Pearl sees the scan of Andrea's lung and realises she has cancer, her determination to quit is stronger than ever. Elsewhere, Isla arranges a party for Alana's 40th and Jenny is put out when she does not receive an invitation. Note: 0.84m tuned in to this episode
Episode 28	13 February 2008 UK / 11 June 2009 Australia	28 (1x28)
Gemma discovers she is not pregnant. Carmen Stevens, a sexy 22-year-old bride, rushes into The Royal in her wedding dress. Her new husband, 60-year-old Arnold Stevens, has been brought in after collapsing as he said "I do" at the beach wedding. Sarah diagnoses a bleeding duodenal ulcer. He has been having symptoms for months but did not want to put Carmen off him – she has changed his life and he did not want her to think he was on his last legs. As Kieran takes Arnold's medical history from Carmen, she reveals that their families have disowned them because of the age gap. Sarah reassures him he is going to be fine, but when he starts to cough up blood and collapses, the crash team is alerted. Ormerod and Sarah manage to stabilise Arnold while Carmen cries hysterically. As Isla watches Carmen worry, she tells Pamela she is sceptical about Carmen's feelings for Arnold. Believing Carmen is interested in only the size of his wallet, Isla claims she knows her type – her husband left her for one. However, when Carmen reveals Arnold is penniless and has a struggling business – she married him for love not money – Isla is embarrassed at her cynicism. Elsewhere, another patient, Ruby Cartwright, is admitted. Ruby is blind and has accidentally stabbed herself in the abdomen. She does not want to be separated from her guide dog, Sandy, but relents as a reluctant Norman looks after him. However, when Adam notices that she is doing a crossword, despite the fact that she is meant to be blind, he decides to investigate. Behind the screen, Ruby has overheard Adam and fears losing Sandy. When Adam and Jenny go to confront her, they find her bed empty. Kieran spots Ruby outside in her night dress with the dog and escorts her back to the ward where she explains she thought they would take Sandy away if they discovered she was not blind any more – he is her only family and she cannot bear the thought of losing him. Can the team reassure Ruby that she will not lose her beloved pet? Meanwhile, Kieran has been thinking about relationships and settling down, and he hypothetically asks Adam what he should do about the situation with Gemma. Adam tells him to speak to "the girl" about it if he is sure he wants to have a baby and make the commitment, leaving Kieran with some food for thought. Gemma has returned from her doctor with the news that she is not pregnant after all and, when Kieran takes her to one side and tells her he is ready to make a commitment, Gemma is confused. She realises Carrie has told him her secret and assures him she is not pregnant and he is off the hook, but Kieran is quietly disappointed. Note: 1.04m tuned in to this episode
Episode 29	14 February 2008 UK / 12 June 2009 Australia	29 (1x29)
Woods discovers that a fifteen-year-old girl admitted with abdominal pains has just given birth, and orders a search for the baby. Jonathan treats a footballer admitted with a scrotal haematoma. Heather has an engagement ring, but Adam knows nothing about it. Note: 1.06m tuned in to this episode
Episode 30	15 February 2008 UK / 15 June 2009 Australia	30 (1x30)
Gemma treats an overweight dancer who has been dropped by her partner. Vijay fears that a person with Alzheimer's is being abused by his wife. The team has organised a surprise party for Alana's 40th birthday. Note: 1.14m tuned in to this episode
Episode 31	18 February 2008 UK / 16 June 2009 Australia	31 (1x31)
Kieran suspects that an 18-year-old diabetic admitted after a collapse has been taking ecstasy. Vijay is puzzled by an older woman whose bones will not heal. Heather presses Adam to set a date for their wedding. Note: 1.04m tuned in to this episode
Episode 32	19 February 2008 UK / 17 June 2009 Australia	32 (1x32)
Carrie suspects domestic abuse when a woman is admitted with facial cuts. Woods is angry with a patient who has been cancelling operation appointments. Alana is getting broody. Note: 0.83m tuned in to this episode
Episode 33	20 February 2008 UK / 18 June 2009 Australia	33 (1x33)
An elderly woman is admitted after impaling herself on a bamboo stick. Adam has to treat a young man who bullied him at school. Alana, Isla and Pamela check out a dating website. Note: 1.04m tuned in to this episode
Episode 34	21 February 2008 UK / 19 June 2009 Australia	34 (1x34)
A middle-aged woman is treated for complications arising from an abortion. Jonathan is puzzled by the collapse of a 23-year-old gymnast. Alana is in a good mood following her date. Note: 0.96m tuned in to this episode
Episode 35	22 February 2008 UK / 22 June 2009 Australia	35 (1x35)
Jonathan deals with an uncooperative patient who has been suffering from repeated collapses. Sarah and Pearl attend to an 18-year-old admitted with suspected food poisoning. Norman considers selling the family home. Sarah agrees to out with Vijay. Note: 1.10m tuned in to this episode
Episode 36	25 February 2008 UK / 23 June 2009 Australia	36 (1x36)
Jenny is nervous as the staff at The Royal prepare for a special visitor, Ray Coombes, a local businessman who she hopes will invest large sums of money into a new wing. As Ray arrives with his glamorous Footballers' Wives-style girlfriend, Mandy, Jenny and the team welcome them with fixed false grins. Jenny shows them around the department and it soon becomes clear that Ray is in pain. Mandy expresses her concern and, before he knows it, Ray is lying on the operating table. Ormerod has diagnosed a weakened artery wall known as abdominal aneurysm and an emergency operation is vital. As Ray is about to go under the knife, he tells Woods that if he pulls through, they can have the new wing. The pressure is on as Woods prepares to save the life of a patient and the future of the hospital. Will Woods rise to the challenge? Note: 1.07m tuned in to this episode
Episode 37	26 February 2008 UK / 24 June 2009 Australia	37 (1x37)
Pearl asks Carrie to prepare a bed for a Rosie Wilson. Norman's ears prick up and it is obvious that he is shocked to hear the name. When Rosie comes in with her varicose veins, she quietly tells Norman that they need to talk, before introducing him to her husband Terry. When Terry disappears for a few minutes, Rosie warns Norman that her son, Jimmy, will be coming to visit later and that Norman must not reveal that he is Jimmy's father. Norman tells Heather he is hurt that he cannot talk to his son, but she reminds him that he left Rosie when she told him she was pregnant and that Norman has seen Jimmy only a couple of times, and that was when he was still a baby. Jimmy is 21 now. Note: 1.09m tuned in to this episode
Episode 38	27 February 2008 UK / 25 June 2009 Australia	38 (1x38)
Adam comes in, soaking wet. He was jogging down the beach when he saw a man floating in the sea. Adam pulled him out, but he is in desperate need of medical attention. When the man eventually wakes up, he is unresponsive. Jenny discovers that a fisherman named Danny has been reported missing and, when Adam asks the man whether he is Danny, he eventually concurs. Danny confesses that he tried to kill himself to escape debts. Holly, Danny's wife, arrives with their son, and Adam takes her aside to tell her that Danny attempted suicide because his life insurance would secure his family's future. Holly is horrified, as well as hurt that Danny chose not to speak to her. She briefly sees her husband, but then goes to walk out. Adam urges her not to leave, but can he stop her from leaving a man who was willing to go away from her for ever without any explanation? Note: 1.08m tuned in to this episode
Episode 39	28 February 2008 UK / 26 June 2009 Australia	39 (1x39)
A young mum, Alice Neale, rushes into casualty with her ill four-year-old daughter, Abi, in her arms. As she enters the hospital, Kristaps catches them up and tells her she needs to move her van, as she has parked in the ambulance bay. Alice pleads with Kristaps to move the camper van for her. As Kristaps heads off, Kieran takes Alice through to A&E, much to the annoyance of Bernadette who has been waiting with her teenage daughter, Siobhan, for some time. Sarah examines Abi and identifies that she has not ingested anything corrosive. However, she is concerned about the chest pains that Abi has been having and orders a number of tests to get to the bottom of Abi's illness. Note: 1.09m tuned in to this episode
Episode 40	29 February 2008 UK / 29 June 2009 Australia	40 (1x40)
After finding out Kristaps was homeless and offering him a place to live, Norman and Kristaps arrive at the hospital together. Norman reassures Kristaps that he can stay with him for as long as he likes. As they make their way to the entrance, Jenny stops them, giving them a job to do. Jenny dumps a box of leaflets on the desk, and informs Norman and Kristaps that the hospital trust is launching a sexual health campaign, and she wants the pair of them to put up posters around the hospital. Meanwhile, councillor Clive Forrest escorts his hobbling 15-year-old daughter, Anna, to the hospital's walk-in clinic. Arguing on the phone to a journalist about his stance against immorality, breaking off mid-sentence, Clive tells Anna to go on without him. Much to her annoyance, Anna heads off to the clinic alone. Note: 1.08m tuned in to this episode
Episode 41	3 March 2008 UK / 30 June 2009 Australia	41 (1x41)
Jonathan admits a confused old woman for tests. Sarah attends to a young Buddhist woman admitted with hearing problems. Pamela operates to remove gall stones from an oversized male patient. Gemma plans a surprise birthday party for Carrie. Note: 0.91m tuned in to this episode
Episode 42	4 March 2008 UK / 1 July 2009 Australia	42 (1x42)
Kieran and Sarah attend to a magician with a cough. Jonathan admits a man who has been passing blood. Woods, Jenny, Alana, Kristaps, Pearl and Carrie attend a course in moving, handling and back care. Adam chastises Heather for organising a dress-fitting during working hours. Norman offers to provide a karaoke machine for Carrie's party. Note: 0.89m tuned in to this episode
Episode 43	5 March 2008 UK / 2 July 2009 Australia	43 (1x43)
Jonathan attends to an elderly woman admitted after a fall. Adam threatens Heather with disciplinary action. Vijay escorts Carrie to her surprise birthday party. Heather makes a surprise announcement, while Maisy has a serious accident. Note: 0.93m tuned in to this episode
Episode 44	6 March 2008 UK / 3 July 2009 Australia	44 (1x44)
There are tensions at the Royal as staff go back to work on the morning after Carrie's birthday party. Kieran and Pamela attend to a gunshot victim. Note: 0.97m tuned in to this episode
Episode 45	7 March 2008 UK / 6 July 2009 Australia	45 (1x45)
Jonathan and Kieran attend to an elderly woman suffering from unusually low blood pressure. Carrie is upset by that Vijay has not called her. Pamela and Isla tease Jenny about Mr Woods. Heather wants to tell Norman about Maisy's secret. Note: 0.86m tuned in to this episode
Episode 46	10 March 2008 UK / 7 July 2009 Australia	46 (1x46)
A lap dancer is admitted with ulcerative colitis but is reluctant to agree to invasive surgery. Pearl is concerned about the patient's boyfriend. Kieran and Sarah attend a patient suffering from severe headaches. Adam has doubts about his feelings for Heather. Note: 1.23m tuned in to this episode
Episode 47	11 March 2008 UK / 8 July 2009 Australia	47 (1x47)
Jonathan attends to an anorexic patient and her exhausted father. Kieran and Pamela attend to an injured base jumper. Jenny and Mr Woods clash over management's plans to test hospital productivity. Adam has decided to fight to win Heather back. Note: 1.19m tuned in to this episode
Episode 48	12 March 2008 UK / 9 July 2009 Australia	48 (1x48)
A local darts champion has been admitted for a haemorrhoidectomy but may also be suffering from a psychological disorder. A management consultant, visiting The Royal to recommend a series of cost-cutting measures, suffers from severe abdominal pains. Vijay continues to avoid Carrie. Note: 1.15m tuned in to this episode
Episode 49	13 March 2008 UK / 10 July 2009 Australia	49 (1x49)
A man is admitted with stomach pains after a boisterous stag weekend. Kieran and Sarah attend to a teenager with a mystery illness. Heather finds herself the focus of some unwelcome attention from her male colleagues. Sarah confronts Jonathan about their relationship. Note: 1.30m tuned in to this episode
Episode 50	14 March 2008 UK / 13 July 2009 Australia	50 (1x50)
Kristaps finds a collapsed Norman. Norman and Kristaps look on as Heather and Adam arrive together, more the loving couple than ever before. As the couple draws closer, Kristaps tells them they should have an engagement party. When Heather announces that the party is not important and all that matters is them, Isla, ever the sceptic, overhears the speech by Heather. Walking past the happy scene, Isla grumpily tells Alana that love and marriage start all rosy in the garden but they never stay that way. Alana makes the comment that Isla is slowly turning into a grumpy old woman. Unperturbed by Alana's comments, Isla continues to bemoan the happy couple. Elsewhere in the locker room, Gemma and Carrie are bickering over the fact that Gemma borrowed a pair of Carrie's shoes. Carrie assures Gemma that this would not normally cause a problem, but the fact that Gemma threw up in them makes this case different. When the pair see Vijay down the corridor, Gemma believes he is the reason behind Carrie's temper. When Gemma confronts Vijay about his behaviour, will the radiologist see the error of his ways? In casualty, Kieran takes the details of pensioner Wilf Richards. When asked for his address, Wilf informs Kieran that he is in the process of moving and does not know the exact address but indicates a prison officer in the corner who would know. As Ormerod examines him, Wilf informs him that the symptoms came on when he was being moved to a different prison. When Ormerod examines Wilf's abdomen, he admits he can feel something unusual and is thoroughly surprised when he feels a vibration. What could be behind the unusual symptoms and vibrations? Gathered around the nurses' station, Heather happily shows off her ring to everyone. Happy for the couple, Pearl threatens Heather that they better go through with the wedding this time. Will the couple finally have their happy ending? Elsewhere, Sarah confronts Ormerod about where she stands in his life. In a heated argument, he embraces her to calm her down. Sarah tells Jonathan she will not wait for him any more and says she is going to resign. Will Ormerod let Sarah go instead of admitting his true feelings for her? Meanwhile, on Middleditch Ward, Kevin Gough is recovering from the previous day's surgery. As Mr Woods attends to Kevin's post-surgery assessment, Jenny arrives and severely berates Kevin for disturbing the night staff. As Jenny prepares to leave, Kevin makes a snide comment, much to Woods' amusement and Jenny's annoyance. Once Jenny is out of earshot, Kevin sarcastically tells Woods that Jenny likes him. Everyone else is aware of the chemistry between Woods and Jenny apart from them – that is until an argument results in a passionate kiss. Will Woods and Jenny accept their feelings for each other? That afternoon, Kevin's raucous friends return to the hospital to visit. Discussing the previous night's shenanigans, the boys start wrestling and accidentally knock Gemma. Finding the whole incident amusing, the boys laugh when Gemma tells them off, but Kevin is quick to come to Gemma's defence. When Gavin then starts on Heather, Norman sees red and comes to her aid, but before he can do anything, Gavin punches him in the face. Norman staggers, but does not seem to be seriously injured. However, later when looking for Norman, Kristaps finds him collapsed in the car park. Norman is rushed into theatre for emergency surgery after an extradural haematoma is diagnosed. The theatre staff do all they can to help Norman, but will it be enough? Note: 0.95m tuned in to this episode
