= List of Emmerdale characters introduced in 2026 =

Emmerdale is a British soap opera that first aired on 16 October 1972. The following characters made or will make their debut in 2026. The first character to appear was Summer (Vera Chok), a private investigator hired by Joe Tate (Ned Porteous). Clive (Phil Mealey), a cancer patient who meets Cain Dingle (Jeff Hordley) at a support group made an appearance in March. April saw the birth of Leyla Sugden, the adoptive child of Sarah (Katie Hill) and Jacob Sugden (Joe-Warren Plant). Then in June, Angela Lonsdale joined as DS Reid, who will be followed by Serena Sugden (Casey Al-Shaqsy), a new member of the long-standing Sugden family. Additionally, several other characters appear throughout the year.

== Summer ==
Summer, portrayed by Vera Chok, is a private investigator hired by Joe Tate (Ned Porteous) to investigate into the death of Graham Foster (Andrew Scarborough). She first appears on 16 January 2026 when she meets with Joe at The Hide, where she brings DI Dent (Linda Armstrong) who investigated Graham's murder, which turned out to be faked, six years before. Daniel Kilkelly from Digital Spy announced Chok's casting following her first appearance: "Former Hollyoaks star Vera Chok has been cast in the role of Summer the PI, who meets up with Joe at The Hide in tonight's episode." It was also revealed that Chok's role would be a guest stint.

== Clive ==
Clive, portrayed by Phil Mealey, is a cancer patient who is attending a support group with Cain Dingle (Jeff Hordley). Mealey's casting was announced on 24 March 2026 and he made his first appearance on the same day. Divya Soni from Digital Spy described that Mealey had taken on a "sombre role". Clive met Cain at the support group, which he was reluctant to attend, however before the meeting, he was approached by Clive who explained his relationship struggles since his cancer diagnosis. After hearing this, Cain walks away from the meeting. Soni described: "Clive's words clearly struck a nerve with Cain, who was already anxious about his surgery and marriage. He instantly changed his mind about attending the meeting and stormed away."

== Leyla Sugden ==
Leyla Sugden
- Emmerdale character
- Portrayed by: Sally Isabel Wright
- First appearance: Episode 10,557; 22 April 2026
- Introduced by: Iain MacLeod
In-universe information
- Father: Ross Barton
- Mother: Charity Dingle
- Adoptive father: Jacob Gallagher
- Adoptive mother: Sarah Sugden
- Stepfather: Mackenzie Boyd
- Brothers: Moses Dingle
- Half-brothers: Ryan Stocks; Noah Dingle; Johnny Woodfield (adoptive)
- Half-sisters: Debbie Dingle
- Grandfathers: Obadiah Dingle; James Barton; Justin Gallagher (adoptive); Andy Sugden (adoptive)
- Grandmothers: Emma Barton; Leyla Harding (adoptive); Debbie Dingle (adoptive)
- Uncles: Pete Barton; Finn Barton; Adam Barton; Lewis Barton; Jack Sugden (adoptive)
- Nephews: Oscar Grisham; Jack Sugden
- Nieces: Sarah Sugden

Leyla Charity Sugden, portrayed by Sally Isabel Wright, is the newborn daughter of Charity Dingle (Emma Atkins) and Ross Barton (Michael Parr). She first appeared on 22 April 2026 when she was born. Charity was initially being a surrogate for her granddaughter Sarah Sugden (Katie Hill) and her now husband Jacob (Joe Warren Plant), but ended up falling pregnant by Ross. However, despite knowing Ross was the father, she continued to pass her baby off as Jacob and Sarah's. After she was born, Leyla was named after two characters. Her middle name Charity after her alleged great-grandmother who gave birth to her, and her first Leyla after Jacob's mother, Leyla Harding (Roxy Shahidi), who died in a Limo crash in February 2025. Joe Anderton from Digital Spy described this gesture to be a "touching tribute" to those characters.

== DS Reid ==
DS Reid
- Emmerdale character
- Portrayed by: Angela Lonsdale
- First appearance: Episode 10,589; 8 June 2026
- Last appearance: Episode 10,618; 20 July 2026
- Introduced by: Iain MacLeod
In-universe information
- Occupation: Detective Sergeant

Detective Sergeant Reid, portrayed by Angela Lonsdale, is a police officer who made her first appearance on 8 June 2026. She first appears when Charity Dingle (Emma Atkins) reports Doctor Todd (Caroline Harker) for sexually assaulting her. Daniel Kilkelly from Digital Spy reported: "Emmerdale introduces a familiar face from Coronation Street tonight as Charity Dingle bravely seeks support following her ordeal with Dr Todd." He continued: "Angela Lonsdale has been cast in the guest role of DS Reid, who interviews Charity at the police station following the landlady's decision to report Dr Todd's crime." Kilkelly also described DS Reid as "sensitively asks questions and discusses next steps" regarding the crime. Lonsdale is known for her many soap roles over the years, such as in Holby City, Doctors, Hollyoaks, but her most prolific being series regular Emma Watts in Coronation Street.

Lonsdale has previously expressed an interest in a role on Emmerdale. She told Inside Soap: "I've been on so many [soaps] now! I was in Corrie for years, then Doctors, and I did Holby City. I think I'm used to that way of working. Often in soap you do one take and move on, I like working like that. I think once you act in a soap, you can do anything." Speaking specifically about Emmerdale, she said: "I wouldn't say no! I've been up there a few times and been close to getting a few parts – I wouldn't be opposed to joining another soap. It's nice to be part of a family, that's what I love about it." On 21 July 2026, it was reported that Lonsdale would be leaving the soap. Lonsdale posted a montage of behind-the-scenes moments on Instagram with the caption: "What an honour and a privilege to play DS REID and be trusted with such a sensitive storyline." She also thanked fellow cast members including Atkins, who plays Charity, as well as Michelle Hardwick, Lawrence Robb and Harker, who play Vanessa Woodfield, Mackenzie Boyd and the villainous Doctor Todd respectively. Lonsdale said that working alongside her "phenomenally talented" co-stars was "one of the highlights of [her] career". Lonsdale also thanked the cast and crew making her feel "part of the family from day one".

== Kylie ==
Kylie
- Emmerdale character
- Portrayed by: Pippa Fulton
- First appearance: Episode 10,598/99; 22 June 2026
- Last appearance: Episode 10,602/3; 25 June 2026
- Introduced by: Iain MacLeod

Kylie, portrayed by Pippa Fulton, first appeared on 22 June 2026 after Lewis Barton (Bradley Riches) is taken hostage. Fulton's casting was announced on 16 June 2026 and Kylie is her third role in Emmerdale after playing two minor characters in 2014 and 2017 respectively. Divya Soni from Digital Spy spoke of Fulton's casting: "A mysterious new villain will be arriving in the village next week when Emmerdale's Lewis Barton is shockingly taken hostage. The kidnapper is revealed to be a woman named Kylie, who fans may recognise as Fame Academy star Pippa Fulton." Kylie's debut is also to tie in with the return of Lewis' biological father Kev Towsend (Chris Coghill), whom she demands he returns a diamond named Penny to her, otherwise she would keep Lewis hostage.

On 24 June 2026, Fulton announced her departure on Instagram by posting: "Hi I'm KYLIE!! Catch her causing havoc all this week on EMMERDALE!!!" She posted a series of photos from behind-the-scenes, and thanked co-stars Bradley Riches, Michael Parr and Chris Coghill, who play Lewis Barton, Ross Barton and Kev Townsend respectively. Of Riches, she posted: "You were like an old friend after being in your presence for an hour, and I felt like we'd been friends in another life! What a dream and an inspiration you are! And you had this old bird Tick Tocking!! To be continued haha…" Of Parr, she said: "You are the nicest human and had me on a knife edge trying not to laugh right before a take. thank you for always being so lovely." And of Coghill, she wrote: "What an absolute honour to play along side you, you made my lifelong hardcore Emmerdale mad mum so happy when she received a video message from you & Mike… what ledges." Riches dubbed Fulton as a "legend", whereas Parr expressed his hope for her to return. He commented: "What a hoot you've been to work with. As if its the second time we got to cross paths. You were brilliant love. Praying they get you back x."

== Serena Sugden ==
Serena Sugden
- Emmerdale character
- Portrayed by: Casey Al-Shaqsy
- First appearance: Episode 10,600; 23 June 2026
- Introduced by: Iain MacLeod
In-universe information
- Other relatives: Robert Sugden; Victoria Sugden; Harry Sugden; Sarah Sugden (adoptive)

Serena Sugden, portrayed by West End theatre star Casey Al-Shaqsy, first appeared on 23 June 2026. Her introduction was intended to expand the Sugden family who have been present in the village since 1972. It was revealed on 25 June 2026 that Serena's grandfather was the cousin of Jack Sugden (Clive Hornby). Al-Shaqsy's casting was announced on 10 June 2026 after previous reports that there would be a new member of the Sugden family joining the series. Daniel Kilkelly from Digital Spy revealed that Serena will "cross paths with some of the show's biggest characters in the months ahead." Emmerdale bosses announced that her storylines would be "dramatic" and "unexpected". Kilkelly also revealed that Al-Shaqsy began filming in April 2026. Kilkelly also revealed: "Serena's early scenes see her drawn into the aftermath of a traumatic situation involving an established character – and she soon feels conflicted about what she's become embroiled in."

Al-Shaqsy spoke about her casting: "I'm absolutely thrilled to be joining such an iconic show and playing a Sugden! Serena is a fantastic character with so much going on beneath the surface. I can't wait for the audience to see the drama unfold." Show producer Laura Shaw added: "The Sugdens are a core part of the Emmerdale fabric, and we are thrilled to welcome Casey to the family." She continued: "Her character will be at the heart of some extremely gripping and unexpected storylines, forcing her to make difficult choices that will have dramatic consequences for some of the village's biggest names." In May 2026, Shaw exclusively spoke to Inside Soap about expanding the Sugden and Tate families after years of "Dingle dominance". She said: "At the start of last year, I wanted to cement the families in our show. Everyone always talks about the Dingles, but I felt like we needed to build up some of the other families – that's probably what I'm most proud of." She continued: "I've been trying to do the same with the Sugdens as well as the Tates. Obviously, Isabel [Hodgins, who plays Victoria] is on maternity leave, but Sarah's (Katie Hill married Jacob (Joe-Warren Plant) – he's taken the Sugden name – and what I want to do over the course of the next few months is remind everyone that Sarah's also a Sugden."

== Helen ==
Helen
- Emmerdale character
- Portrayed by: Nicole Evans
- First appearance: Episode 10,619; 21 July 2026
- Last appearance: Episode 10,620; 22 July 2026
- Introduced by: Iain MacLeod
In-universe information
- Occupation: NHS Worker

Helen, portrayed by Nicole Evans, is an NHS worker who was sexually assaulted by Dr. Caitlin Todd (Caroline Harker). She first appeared on 21 July 2026 after Vanessa Woodfield (Michelle Hardwick) approached Carol from HR regarding historical reports against Todd after the investigation against her was dropped by DS Reid (Angela Lonsdale). Evans' casting was announced on 7 July 2026 with very few details being released except that her character would be a guest role.

A TV insider reported: "This is really exciting for Nicole. She's playing a really intriguing character with a huge secret that will ruffle feathers in the village." Stephanie Chase from Digital Spy said about Evans' upcoming role: "It's currently unclear when Evans will make her debut in the Dales, nor do we know which figures she will be involved with in terms of the storyline. Given that it's soapland, we can be sure it'll be dramatic even if it's a brief stint."

== Steve Sykes ==
Steve Sykes
- Emmerdale character
- Portrayed by: Jason Done
- First appearance: Episode 10,622; 24 July 2026
- Last appearance: Episode 10,635; 11 August 2026
- Introduced by: Iain MacLeod

Steve Sykes, portrayed by Jason Done, is an old friend of Kev Barton (Chris Coghill) who first appeared on 24 July 2026. Done's casting was announced on 6 July 2026 with George Lewis from Digital Spy describing it as a "big move" for Emmerdale. Lewis also revealed: "Though the specifics are yet to be detailed, his arrival is set to be part of a major new storyline for the ITV soap." Done is known for appearing on BBC One drama Waterloo Road as Tom Clarkson between 2006 and 2013. Lewis described this difference in roles: "The actor portrayed Tom Clarkson on the BBC drama for seven years before departing in 2013, but will trade the school system for the Yorkshire Dales as he is set to play a new villain."

A spokesperson for ITV confirmed that Done's role would have a "surprising connection to the village", however his role would be brief, but could have a long lasting impact in the future. Done has also appeared in other soaps, such as Coronation Street and Casualty, and he also played Stephen Snow in long-running ITV1 drama Where the Heart Is, a role which had previously been played by William Ash, who plays series regular Caleb Miligan in Emmerdale.

== Thea Ramsden ==
Thea Ramsden
- Emmerdale character
- Portrayed by: Chelsea Edge
- First appearance: Episode 10,635; 11 August 2026
- Introduced by: Iain MacLeod
In-universe information
- Occupation: Detective Sergeant
- Father: Steve Marchant
- Mother: Kim Tate
- Half-brothers: Jamie Tate
- Nephews: Thomas Tate
- Nieces: Millie Tate

Detective Sergeant Anthea "Thea" Ramsden, portrayed by Chelsea Edge, is a police officer who is investigating the death of Dr. Caitlin Todd (Caroline Harker). Edge's casting was announced on 11 August 2026 and it was revealed that her character would be the main detective investigating the crime. She first appeared on 11 August 2026. An Emmerdale insider told Digital Spy: "Ramsden means business and she'll stop at nothing to get to the truth. It's tough for Charity and Sarah to stick to their story under so much pressure, so it's anyone's guess how this messy situation will turn out..." Emmerdale producer Laura Shaw told The Mirror of the upcoming scenes: "They are locked in a secret and that's going to be long-lasting, and going forward, that's going to affect their relationship." She continued: "Obviously, there's still the baby secret to come out at some point. It's going to, it's got to happen at some point. And how that will affect the story with regards to the murder and Todd, you'll have to wait and see."

On 17 August 2026, a twist revealed that Ramsden and fellow newcomer Serena Sugden (Casey Al-Shaqsy) had a connection and the latter was helping her with a vendetta against the Tate family. Al-Shaqsy said: "Thea is the person who Serena has been secretly texting. They are very, very close friends. That's something that anyone can relate to – you know, your bestie from home! She is one of Serena's best friends in the world." She continued: "Serena's journey into the village was genuinely to see her family. She did want to get closer with the Sugdens, but when she mentioned to her best mate that she was going to Emmerdale, Thea has gone, 'Huh, I need you to do me a favour!' So whilst all the drama's happening with her own life, Serena is then looking out for somebody else too and trying to get all this information for her."

On 1 September 2026, a twist flashback revealed the reason behind Thea's targeting of the Tate family. She is revealed to be the biological daughter of Kim Tate (Claire King). She was born either prematurely or with an illness, and is given up for adoption by Kim. The reason why she was given up for adoption is currently unknown.

== DC Price ==
DC Price
- Emmerdale character
- Portrayed by: Dean Smith
- First appearance: Episode 10,635; 11 August 2026
- Introduced by: Iain MacLeod
In-universe information
- Occupation: Detective Constable

Detective Constable Price, portrayed by Dean Smith, is a police officer who appears when Charity Dingle (Emma Atkins) and Sarah Sugden (Katie Hill) are arrested for the murder of Doctor Todd (Caroline Harker). His casting was announced on 11 August 2026 and Smith first appeared on the same day. This is Smith's second role in Emmerdale after playing Prison Officer Beeker in April 2022, who Meena Jutla (Paige Sandhu) flirted with after being imprisoned for various crimes, including multiple murders. Smith is best known for playing schoolboy Philip Ryan in Waterloo Road.

Divya Soni compared Smith's new role to his previous role on Channel 4 soap opera Hollyoaks: "This isn't the first (or second time) Smith has played a law enforcer, as he also had a semi-regular role in Hollyoaks, appearing as DS Yates between 2018 and 2019." Soni also revealed: "Smith will be starring opposite newcomer Chelsea Edge, who joins Emmerdale as DS Ramsden." Smith also played Andy Wingfield, the counsellor of Paul Foreman (Peter Ash) in Coronation Street for three episodes in 2019.

== Other characters ==
Character	Portrayer(s)	Episode date(s)	Details	Ref.
Zara Adams	Frog Stone	17 February–4 May	Bear Wolf's (Joshua Richards) solicitor who represents him when being interviewed for the murder of Ray Walters (Joe Absolom).	
William Tate	Bobbie Hamilton-Sawford	28 August–present	The baby of Joe Tate (Ned Porteous) and Dawn Fletcher (Olivia Bromley) who has an early birth because of a car accident. Shortly after his birth, Dawn dies from a severe loss of blood, however, Dawn was in fact stabbed in her hospital bed by Joe after he learned that Dawn was planning on leaving him for [Billy Fletcher] (Jay Kontzle). Joe then plans to put him up for adoption.	
