= Picking Up the Pieces (TV series) =

British medical drama

- Genre: Medical drama
- Created by: Anita Pandolfo
- Written by: Anita Pandolfo; Paul Henry Powell
- Starring: Amanda Abbington; Simon Chadwick; Ken Christiansen; Terence Hillyer; Des McAleer; Diane Parish; Jenna Russell; Rachel Sanders; Richard Standing; Roger Walker
- Theme music composer: Kirsty MacColl
- Country of origin: United Kingdom
- Original language: English
- No. of series: 1
- No. of episodes: 8

Production
- Executive producer: Rob Pursey
- Producer: Paul Marquess
- Running time: 60 minutes
- Production company: Central Independent Television

Original release
- Network: ITV
- Release: 29 October – 17 December 1998

Picking Up the Pieces is a British medical drama about an ambulance service team. It aired on ITV between 29 October and 17 December 1998 and was produced by Central Independent Television.

== Premise ==
The series follows the lives of a team of paramedics and emergency medical technicians with the North Area Ambulance Service, facing life and death situations in the fictional city of Matherton.

== Production ==
The series was filmed in the Derbyshire town of Ilkeston, using the real life ambulance station and vehicles in the series. The opening and closing theme of the series was created by Kirsty MacColl after she was contacted by the series producer to write a theme with a Northern Soul feel.

== Cast ==
=== Main ===
- Amanda Abbington as Louise Hunter (Staff Nurse)
- Simon Chadwick as Tony Anzari (Emergency Medical Technician)
- Ken Christiansen as Geoff Squires (Emergency Medical Technician)
- Terence Hillyer as Alan Boddington
- Des McAleer as Bill Tansey (Ambulance Manager)
- Diane Parish as Lisa Gee (Paramedic)
- Jenna Russell as Bernadette Wallace (Paramedic)
- Rachel Sanders as Caroline Marshall
- Richard Standing as Michael Lowther (Emergency Medical Technician)
- Roger Walker as Barry Courtland (Emergency Medical Technician)

=== Recurring ===
- Francesca Folan as Dr. Stephanie Reynolds (episodes 1–2 & 5–8)
- Ruth Jones as Marie (episodes 3, 5, 7 & 8)
- Scott Steele as Tom Gallagher (episodes 1 & 3–5)
- Angela Lonsdale as Clare (episodes 5–7)
- James Vaughan as Arthur (episodes 4 & 8)
- Sharon Muircroft as Maureen (episodes 3 & 4)

=== Guest appearances ===
Picking Up the Pieces features a number of notable future established actors in guest appearances, including: Richard Bremmer, Fiona Dolman, Martin Freeman, Melanie Gutteridge, Raza Jaffrey, Maxine Peake, Joanna Scanlan, Rhashan Stone and Jeremy Young.

== Episodes ==
No.	Title	Directed by	Written by	Original release date	UK viewers (millions)
1	"Episode 1"	Roger Gartland	Anita Pandolfo	29 October 1998	7.81
The paramedics attend a heart-attack victim – in a brothel – and lives are at risk when an ambulance crashes.
2	"Episode 2"	Indra Bhose	Anita Pandolfo	5 November 1998	N/A
Lisa cannot find a hospital bed for a dying man, while Michael puts his job on the line for the sake of a patient.
3	"Episode 3"	Gwennan Sage	Anita Pandolfo	12 November 1998	N/A
Michael and Tony try to help a wife who has been assaulted but end up facing violence themselves. Meanwhile, a woman goes into labour in Bernadette's ambulance.
4	"Episode 4"	Roger Gartland	Anita Pandolfo	19 November 1998	N/A
Bill and Bernadette confront difficult decisions while trying to rescue a trapped man. Meanwhile, Caroline and Boddington find themselves in a compromising situation.
5	"Episode 5"	Laura Sims	Anita Pandolfo	26 November 1998	6.46
Geoff and Lisa find themselves in trouble after pushing a teenage girl too far. Meanwhile, Barry confronts the reality of undergoing a vasectomy.
6	"Episode 6"	Christopher King	Anita Pandolfo	3 December 1998	N/A
Bernadette discovers the importance of maintaining emotional boundaries with patients, while Tony finds himself falling in love.
7	"Episode 7"	Bill Eagles	Anita Pandolfo	10 December 1998	7.15
Tony faces danger after a syringe accident while treating someone from his past, and Barry is upset about the on-board computers.
8	"Episode 8"	Laura Sims	Anita Pandolfo	17 December 1998	6.87
The paramedics respond to a prison riot and Lisa is finally forced to admit the truth.
