= Angela Lonsdale =

British actress

- Born: Angela Smith; 13 October 1967 (age 58); Penrith, Cumbria, England
- Education: Royal Conservatoire of Scotland
- Occupation: Actress
- Years active: 1992–present
- Spouse: Perry Fenwick (m. 2005; sep. 2010)

Angela Lonsdale (née Smith; 13 October 1967) is an English actress. She is known for her roles in various British soap operas including Emma Taylor in Coronation Street, Eva Moore in Doctors and DS Reid in Emmerdale.

== Early and personal life ==
Born to a policeman father, Lonsdale trained at Brewery Youth Theatre at the Brewery Arts Centre, Kendal. Whilst there, she took part in many amateur productions, including plays by local playwrights John Newman-Holden and Tim Bull. After initial rejection, Lonsdale then graduated from the Royal Scottish Academy of Music and Drama.

In 2005, Lonsdale married actor Perry Fenwick, who plays Billy Mitchell in EastEnders. They separated in 2010.

== Career ==
After various minor appearances in British television series, Lonsdale was cast as police officer Emma Watts (née Taylor) on the ITV soap opera Coronation Street. First appearing in April 2000, her storylines included a long-lasting feud with neighbour Les Battersby and a tempestuous marriage to Curly Watts, with whom she departed Weatherfield in September 2003. Next, Lonsdale began appearing as DI Eva Moore in the daytime BBC drama Doctors. She left the programme in October 2008 when her character was shot and presumed dead, but made a brief return in September 2011.

Amongst other credits including Wolfblood, All Quiet on the Preston Front, The Bill, Casualty, Holby City, Joe Maddison's War, This Is England '90, Scott & Bailey, Vera, Our Girl and The Syndicate, in 2022 she was cast as Gill Holmes in Hollyoaks. Then, in 2026, she joined the cast of the ITV soap opera Emmerdale as DS Reid.

== Acting credits ==
=== Film ===
Year	Title	Role	Notes
2017	Black Eyed Susan	Friend #2	Short film
2019	Underwater	Sally	Short film

=== Television ===
Year	Title	Role	Notes
1992	Firm Friends	Shop Assistant	1 episode
1992	Byker Grove	Lorraine	1 episode
1993	Fighting for Gemma	Vivien Hope	Television film
1994	Finney	Suzie	Series regular
1994–2006	The Bill	Helen Coles; D.C. Sue Donny; Dr. Tyler	9 episodes
1995	Kavanagh QC	Lisa Marie Parks	1 episode
1997	Catherine Cookson's The Moth	Nancy Parkin	Miniseries; main role
1997	A Touch of Frost	W.P.C. Harman	1 episode
1997	All Quiet on the Preston Front	Mel	6 episodes
1998	Seesaw	Donna	Miniseries; 1 episode
1998	The Vanishing Man	Lara	1 episode
1998	Hetty Wainthropp Investigates	Jackie	1 episode
1998	Picking Up the Pieces	Clare	3 episodes
1998–2014	Casualty	Lyn Hopper; Helen Caffrey; Joy; Karen Sunderland	6 episodes
1999	Peak Practice	Kate Wallace	1 episode
1999	City Central	Kim Porter	1 episode
2000	The Last Musketeer	Lena	Television film
2000–2003	Coronation Street	Emma Taylor	Series regular
2005–2019	Holby City	"Scary" Sue Buchanan; Gina Calder	6 episodes
2006	The Afternoon Play	Wendy Tyler	1 episode
2006–2008, 2011	Doctors	DI Eva Moore	Recurring role
2009	The Royal	Anna Whenby	1 episode
2010	Joe Maddison's War	Polly Maddison	Television film
2012	Best Possible Taste: The Kenny Everett Story	Lily Cole	Television film
2012–2013	Wolfblood	Emma Smith	Series regular
2014	WPC 56	Stella Monckton	1 episode
2015	This Is England '90	Stella	2 episodes
2016	Scott & Bailey	Gina Mitchell	1 episode
2016–2020	Our Girl	Grace Lane	Recurring role
2018	Vera	Ellie Dewey	1 episode
2018	Moving On	Jackie	1 episode
2020	Run	Leanne	Web series; main role
2021	The Syndicate	Mrs. Lavine	3 episodes
2022	Shakespeare & Hathaway: Private Investigators	Elaine Davis	1 episode
2022	Hollyoaks	Gill Holmes	Guest role
2026	Emmerdale	DS Reid	Recurring role

=== Podcasts ===
Year	Title	Role	Notes
2016–2021	Stone	Jolene; Cat	6 episodes

=== Theatre ===
Year	Title	Role	Notes
1992	And a Nightingale Sang	Joyce	Northern Stage
1993–1994	Cinderella	Claudette	Northern Stage
1998	Bluebird		Royal Court Theatre
2008	Sunday for Sammy	Undercover Cop	Newcastle City Hall
2008	Gertrude's Secret		Lawrence Batley Theatre
2010	Peter Creme's Eyes	Katharine	Live Theatre
2012	Pack	Deb	Finborough Theatre
2013	Get Got	Kira Czar	Edinburgh Festival Fringe
2022	Fat Friends The Musical		Theatre Royal
