= Junior Paramedics =

- Also known as: Junior Paramedics: Your Life in Their Hands
- Genre: Factual
- Narrated by: Jason Done
- Opening theme: Waiting All Night by Rudimental; Red Lights by Tiësto
- Country of origin: United Kingdom
- Original language: English
- No. of series: 1
- No. of episodes: 7 (list of episodes)

Production
- Executive producer: Ceri Aston
- Production locations: Northamptonshire & Leicestershire
- Editor: Darrell Olsen
- Running time: 60 minutes

Original release
- Network: BBC Three
- Release: 27 February – 8 April 2014

Related
- Junior Doctors: Your Life in Their Hands

Junior Paramedics is a British television series that was first broadcast on BBC Three from 27 February to 8 April 2014. The series follows paramedics on a six-week placement with East Midlands Ambulance Service. The nine junior paramedics are Lucy Wright, Bryn Griffiths, Stephanie Cook, Lucy Mellor, Max Brufton, Amy Allen, Ashley Strawbridge, Victoria Hilditch, and Nick Bailey.

== Production ==
The series was commissioned by Zai Bennett, controller of BBC Three, and Sean Hancock, the controller of entertainment commissioning. The executive producer is Ceri Aston. Sean Hancock said: "Junior Paramedics and No Country For Young Men both promise to be thought provoking and exciting series about young people in the UK trying to find their place in the world."

== Episode list ==
Every episode is following the Junior Paramedics for one week of their six weeks placement. Episode 7 is a recap of the previous six episodes.

No.	Title	Original release date
1	"Episode 1"	27 February 2014
2	"Episode 2"	6 March 2014
3	"Episode 3"	13 March 2014
4	"Episode 4"	20 March 2014
5	"Episode 5"	27 March 2014
6	"Episode 6"	3 April 2014
7	"Episode 7"	8 April 2014
