= Fiona Dolman =

Scottish actress

- Born: 30 January 1970 (age 56); Findhorn, Moray, Scotland
- Occupation: Actress
- Years active: 1993–present
- Known for: Midsomer Murders; Heartbeat; The Royal Today
- Spouse: Martin Curry (m. 2000; div. 2012)
- Children: 1

Fiona Dolman (born 30 January 1970) is a Scottish actress known for playing Miss Pamela Andrews in the ITV 2008 daytime drama series and spinoff to The Royal, The Royal Today, and Jackie Bradley (née Lambert) in Heartbeat from 1998 to 2001.

In 1998, Dolman was featured in a supporting role in Channel 4's one-year vampire series Ultraviolet.

From 1998 to 2001, Dolman played Jacqueline "Jackie" Lambert/Jacqueline "Jackie" Bradley in Heartbeat.

Dolman featured briefly in the BBC show Paradox. She also appeared in the BBC series Waterloo Road in August 2010 as a police sergeant.

Since 2011, Dolman has appeared as Sarah Barnaby, wife of DCI John Barnaby and new head teacher at Causton Comprehensive School, in Midsomer Murders. She has also appeared on Lily Savage's Blankety Blank.

In 2013, Dolman gave birth to a daughter. Her pregnancy was also put into Midsomer Murders, with her character giving birth to the character Betty Barnaby.

In 2019, Dolman successfully completed the London Marathon in memory of her father and raised a substantial amount of money for Hospice UK, for which she is an ambassador.

== Filmography ==
=== Film ===
Year	Title	Role	Notes
2006	To the Sea Again	Eleanor	Short film
2010	Ways to Live Forever	Gillian Stranger	
2017	After Eights	Helen	Short film

=== Television ===
Year	Title	Role	Notes
1993	Crime Story	Julie Mugford	Series 2; episode 7: "The White House Farm Murders"
1995	Strike Force	Sarah Kyle	Television film
1996	Rough Justice	Catherine Crooks	Series 12; episode 3: "The Vet's Wife"
1997	A Touch of Frost	Fiona	Series 5; episode 1: "Penny for the Guy"
1997	The Bill	Naomi Goddliffe	Series 13; episode 88: "Hitting the Nerve"
1997	The Knock	Anna Ransley	Series 3; episodes 3–6
1998	Ultraviolet	Frances	Mini-series; episodes 1–6
1998	Midsomer Murders	Charity Solicitor	Series 1; episode 3: "Death of a Hollow Man". Uncredited role
1998	Picking up the Pieces	Liz	Episode 3
1998	The Ruth Rendell Mysteries	Ella	Series 11; episode 7: "The Orchard Walls"
1998–2001	Heartbeat	Jackie Lambert/Bradley	Series 8–10; 54 episodes
2001	The Bill	Tessa Gannon	Series 17; episode 73: "The Value of Nothing"
2001	Lily Savage's Blankety Blank	Herself - Panellist	Series 16; episode 17
2003	Holby City	Pippa Barratt	Series 6; episode 8: "Understanding"
2003	The Bill	Kim Bradbury	Series 19; episodes 39 & 40: "Charlie Foxtrot: Parts 1 & 2"
2005	Doctors	Vera Ashe	Series 6; episode 133: "Dream Lover"
2006	New Tricks	Kate Sutton	Series 3; episode 2: "Dockers"
2007	Diamond Geezer	Agent Mills	Mini-series; episode 2: "Old Gold"
2007	Holby City	Frances Nugent	Series 9; episode 45: "Old Wounds"
2007	The Marchioness Disaster	Nurse #1	Television film
2008	The Royal Today	Miss Pamela Andrews	48 episodes
2009	Doctors	Carol Piddington	Series 11; episode 47: "Chicken Boy"
2009	The Bill	Belinda Rodgers	Series 25; episode 11: "Broken Hearts"
2009	Coronation Street	Solicitor	1 episode
2009	Holby City	Amelia Whittam	Series 11; episode 49: "Spin"
2009	Paradox	Lauren Phelps	Mini-series; episode 1
2010	Waterloo Road	WPC Nichols	Series 6; episode 1
2011	Doctors	Gillian Matheson	Series 13; episode 65: "Sweet Child of Mine"
2011–present	Midsomer Murders	Sarah Barnaby	Series 14–25; 62 episodes
2012	Comedy Blaps	Mrs. Samuels	Series 2; episode 8: "Cumbo: Episode 3"
2013	The Syndicate	Inspector Gleaves	Series 2; episode 6
2013	Da Vinci's Demons	Anna Donati	Series 1; episode 7: "The Hierophant"
2016	In the Club	Dr. Langford	Series 2; episode 5: "Vicky"
2016	Casualty	Phoebe Grady	Series 30; episode 38: "You Make Me Sick"
2024	Doctors	Colleen Peabold	Series 24; episode 231: "What the Eyes Don't See"
2025	Unforgotten	Alison Rowe	Series 6; episodes 3, 4 & 6
