= Jason Done =

English actor

- Born: 5 April 1973 (age 53); Walkden, Lancashire, England
- Occupations: Actor; narrator
- Years active: 1981–present
- Television: Where the Heart Is (1999–2001); Waterloo Road (2006–2013); Can't Pay? We'll Take It Away! (2014–2018); Monsters Inside Me (2022); Emmerdale (2026–present)

Jason Done (born 5 April 1973) is an English actor and narrator. He is best known for portraying the role of Tom Clarkson in the BBC One school-based drama series Waterloo Road (2006–2013). Done's other notable credits include Mordred in the miniseries Merlin (1998), and Stephen Snow in ITV drama series Where The Heart Is (1999–2001). In 2026, he joined the cast of the ITV soap opera Emmerdale as Steve Sykes.

== Career ==
=== Where The Heart Is ===
Done appeared as Stephen Snow in the ITV drama series Where The Heart Is, taking over the part in series 3 from William Ash, in 1999. Stephen Snow was the son of Peggy Snow (Pam Ferris) and Vic Snow (Tony Haygarth). Done portrayed Stephen throughout series 3, 4 and part of 5, during which the character left the fictional town of Skelthwaite.

=== Waterloo Road ===
On 9 March 2006, Done began appearing as English teacher Tom Clarkson in the successful BBC One school-based drama series Waterloo Road. On 10 April 2013, it was announced that Done would be leaving his role as Tom after seven years and eight series. Tom left the series in the final episode of the eighth series, on 4 July 2013, in a shock twist which saw him fall from the school roof after helping troubled pupil Kyle Stack (George Sampson) from committing suicide. Done is the second longest-serving cast member.

=== Theatre ===
Done later appeared in a travelling production of Macbeth, which was held at the Royal Exchange, Manchester, in Manchester.

=== Television ===
In May 2014, Done appeared as Andrew Wendell in Casualty and in October 2014 as Paul Brightway in the story "The Lions of Nemea", part of series 8 of the ITV drama series Lewis. He also starred in Closets, a short film. On 7 February 2016, Done appeared in the TV series Vera. In 2016, he appeared in the ITV/Netflix series Paranoid. Done later joined the cast of the soap opera Emmerdale as guest character Steve Sykes, with his first appearance airing on 24 July 2026.

=== Narration ===
Done narrated the BBC Three documentary series Junior Doctors: Your Life in Their Hands, its 2014 spin-off Junior Paramedics, the BBC series Hair, the BBC series Emergency Rescue Down Under and the Channel 5 documentaries Can't Pay We'll Take It Away, Inside Kings Cross: The Railway and Paddington Station 24/7 along with Ice Lake Rebels and the UK narration to Monsters Inside Me.

== Filmography ==
=== Film ===
| Year | Film | Role | Notes |
|---|---|---|---|
| 2015 | Closets | Henry Clever | Short film |
| 2019 | Underwater | Mr. Lawlor | Short film |
| 2019 | The Road to Gehenna | Father Tom | Short film |
| 2024 | Old Guy | Milo | |
| 2025 | Fackham Hall | J.R.R. Tolkien | |

=== Television ===
| Year | Film | Role | Notes |
|---|---|---|---|
| 1994 | Once Upon a Time in the North | Policeman | Episode: "The Time Morris Launched His Boat" |
| 1994 | Mother's Ruin | Clive Watson | Main role; 6 episodes |
| 1995 | Blood and Peaches | Gary | Miniseries; 2 episodes |
| 1995 | Peak Practice | Mark Rogers | Episode: "Bedside Manners" |
| 1995 | Class Act | Douglas Fewster | Series 2: Episode 5 |
| 1995–1996 | Coronation Street | PC Bathurst | Recurring role; 3 episodes |
| 1996 | Fist of Fun | Various | Recurring role; 2 episodes |
| 1996 | The Bill | Mark Davies | Episode: "Cold Feet and Hot Coffee" |
| 1997 | Wokenwell | PC Brian Rainford | Main role; 6 episodes |
| 1998 | Merlin | Mordred | Miniseries; 2 episodes |
| 1999–2001 | Where the Heart Is | Stephen Snow | Series regular; 34 episodes |
| 2001 | Band of Brothers | Drunk GI | Episode: "Points" |
| 2002 | The King and Us | Reverend Philips | Television film |
| 2002 | Murder | Christopher Maurer | Miniseries; 4 episodes |
| 2003 | In Deep | Sean Denning | Episode: "Full Disclosure" |
| 2003 | Spoilt | Lee | Television film |
| 2003 | Burn It | Pat | Recurring role; 6 episodes |
| 2004 | Sea of Souls | Mike O'Connor | Episode: "Seeing Double" |
| 2004 | Conviction | Sol Draper | Miniseries; 4 episodes |
| 2005 | No Angels | Sean | Series 2: Episode 1 |
| 2005 | The Golden Hour | Nevin | Series 1: Episode 1 |
| 2006–2013 | Waterloo Road | Tom Clarkson | Series regular; 158 episodes |
| 2009–2017 | Monsters Inside Me | Narrator | 70 episodes |
| 2012 | Secret State | Dr. Mark Ashcroft | Series 1: Episode 1 |
| 2014 | Casualty | Andrew Wendall | Episode: "Games for Boys" |
| 2014 | Our Zoo | Neville Kelly | Episode: "The Final Decision" |
| 2014 | Lewis | Paul Brightway | Episode: "The Lions of Nemea" |
| 2015 | Inspector George Gently | Andrew Cullen | Episode: "Breathe in the Air" |
| 2015 | Prey | Gary Sadler | Episode: "The Chase" |
| 2016 | Saved | Narrator | 4 episodes |
| 2016 | Vera | Philip | Episode: "Tuesday's Child" |
| 2016 | Comedy Playhouse | Elliot | Episode: "Broken Biscuits" |
| 2016 | Suspects | Grant Johnson | Episode: "The Enemy Within" |
| 2016 | Paranoid | Dennis | Recurring role; 4 episodes |
| 2017 | Creeped Out | Andrew | Episode: "A Boy Called Red" |
| 2018 | Moving On | Gary | Episode: "Neighbour" |
| 2018 | The Innocents | Doug Squirries | Recurring role; 6 episodes |
| 2020 | Run | Jake | Miniseries; 4 episodes |
| 2021 | Innocent | Gary Walker | Miniseries; 2 episodes |
| 2021 | Time | P.O. Banks | Recurring role; 2 episodes |
| 2022 | Four Lives | Barking Police Sergeant | Series 1: Episode 3 |
| 2022 | Death in Paradise | Connor Faircroft | Episode: "A Double Bogey" |
| 2023 | The Long Shadow | Des O'Boyle | Series 1: Episode 7 |
| 2024 | Brassic | Keith | Episode: "Heartbreak" |
| 2026 | Silent Witness | Sgt Robert Andrews | Episodes: "The Disappearance of Alice Hill: Parts 1 & 2" |
| 2026 | Emmerdale | Steve Sykes | Recurring role |
