= Emmerdale Live =

Live episode of Emmerdale broadcast in 2012

Episodes 6371 and 6372
- Emmerdale episodes
- Episode nos.: Episodes 6371, 6372
- Directed by: Tony Prescott
- Written by: Paul Roundell
- Original air date: 17 October 2012
- Running time: 60 minutes (including adverts)

Episode chronology
← Previous; Episode 6370	Next → Episode 6373

On 17 October 2012, a live episode of the British soap opera Emmerdale was broadcast, marking the 40th anniversary of the first episode in 1972. The episode was broadcast at the usual time of 7 pm on ITV. For the 40th anniversary live episode, Emmerdale announced that a character would die, and that character was Carl King (played by Tom Lister), who was hit with a brick by his love rival Cameron Murray (Dominic Power). The episode also featured a wedding and two births. Behind-the-scenes footage was also included.

== Production ==
To celebrate Emmerdale's 40th anniversary, it was announced on 1 May 2012 that the show would have its first-ever live episode. On 25 June 2012, it was announced that Tony Prescott, who directed the 50th anniversary live episode of Coronation Street in December 2010 would direct the episode. On 23 July it was reported that an ITV2 backstage show, Emmerdale Uncovered: Live, would be broadcast after the live episode. On 14 August, it was announced that the production team was building a new Woolpack set for the live episode. Although Emmerdale's village and interior sets are miles apart, its producers wanted The Woolpack to feature in the live episode. On 6 September, it was confirmed that the One-hour live episode would include an unexpected death, two weddings and two births. Series Producer Stuart Blackburn wanted the identity of the dying character to be kept secret until the episode was broadcast.

Emmerdale Live aired on 17 October 2012, in the middle of the 40th anniversary week, with the death revealed to be Carl King's.

== Rehearsals ==
Rehearsals for the live episode started one week in advance. During rehearsals, Stephen Mulhern pre-recorded some rehearsals and interviewed some of the cast and crew for the aftershow which aired straight after on ITV2 at 8 pm.

== Opening sequence ==
A new opening sequence was used, consisting of an aerial view of the church, zooming in to Carl King (Tom Lister) sitting alone on the grass with dried blood covering his face; Chas (Lucy Pargeter) and Dan Spencer (Liam Fox) preparing to sign the marriage forms; Declan Macey (Jason Merrells) and Katie Sugden (Sammy Winward) arriving at their wedding reception; Carl's bruised brother Jimmy (Nick Miles) walking across a bridge in distress following their showdown in the previous episode; Cameron Murray (Dominic Power) looking out his bedroom window; Gennie Walker (Sian Reese-Williams) going into labour; Debbie Dingle (Charley Webb) getting loaded into the back of an ambulance; and a high-up view of the village.

== Plot ==
=== Part 1 ===
As Chas and Dan sign the register, Carl arrives at the church. Carl is livid that Chas has fooled him and follows as the congregation leave the church. He then confronts Chas but is distracted when he receives a call from Cameron. Katie and Declan have their first dance as Megan Macey (Gaynor Faye) arrives. Zak Dingle (Steve Halliwell) and Cain Dingle (Jeff Hordley) sit in the corridor at the hospital. Cain thanks Zak for calming Debbie. Chas is keen to get in the camper van and leave, but Dan announces that he has planned a surprise wedding reception for her. Debbie asks after Cameron at the hospital, Zak tells her that he has left another message for him. Cameron sits alone in the church waiting for Carl to arrive. A panicked Chas makes a quick excuse to leave the wedding reception and rushes to the pub in an attempt to calm herself. Nicola runs into a bloody Jimmy but he yells at her and walks off claiming he doesn't want to talk. The guests at the wedding reception discuss Chas's odd behaviour. Chas starts to pack her things into a bag as Carl walks into the church.

=== Part 2 ===
Cameron and Carl threaten each other. Katie tells Megan that Robbie Lawson (Jamie Shelton) knew about their scam. As their argument progresses, Cameron picks up a candlestick to hit Carl with, but bottles it. Carl laughs and leaves. Diane catches Chas in tears at the pub, when Dan walks in. Chas begs Dan to get in the van and leave with her. Gennie's waters break. A livid Dan refuses to leave with Chas, thinking that she regrets marrying him. She promises to explain once they leave the village, but he refuses to leave the kids. He gives her the keys to his van and leaves. Debbie tries to get hold of Cameron again but her phone battery is dying. With Gennie about to give birth, Nikhil Sharma (Rik Makarem) ends the wedding reception, clearing people out of the B&B. Bob Hope (Tony Audenshaw) decides they should all crash the marquee. Chas sneaks down to the camper van and attempts to start it but Carl blocks her way.

=== Part 3 ===
Carl confronts Chas over what she has done. Debbie gives birth to a baby boy. Gennie is in the last stages of birth as Nikhil helps via a birthing app on his phone. As the baby arrives, Rhona Goskirk (Zoe Henry) catches it as Nikhil faints. The midwife begins to deliver Debbie's placenta, crucial to Sarah's survival. Robbie arrives at the marquee and Megan confronts him. Chas tries to convince Carl that they can both remain in the village and kisses him. He invites her to sleep with him in the camper van. Disgusted and terrified, Chas plays along and climbs into the back with him. Robbie chases after Megan, trying to explain his actions, he apologises referring to her as "mum" for the first time. Carl, lying on top of a sickened Chas, gets her to remove her wedding ring. Debbie holds the baby for the first time. Chas shoves Carl away as he goes to pull down the straps on her dress, telling him she can't do it. Carl admits his surprise, thinking she'd go further along with the game before crying off. Chas attempts to leave, but Carl grabs her. Debbie feels like she's pushed Cameron away. A dazed Nihkil comes around and sees his daughter for the first time. As the two grapple outside, Chas becomes horrified when Carl finally reveals that he himself killed his father Tom King (Ken Farrington); ranting that he did it for her and he won't let her walk away from him again. Chas slaps Carl and tries again to leave, but Carl brings her down onto the floor as Chas screams for him to get off; she soon reaches out for a brick and hits him on the head, injuring Carl.

=== Part 4 ===
As a distressed Chas runs away from Carl, Cameron notices her and investigates as to what she is running from. Diane gets off the phone with Debbie and tells Ashley that they've decided to call the baby boy Jack Sugden. Chas rushes back into the pub. Carl, still wounded from Chas' attack on him, struggles to sit up. He manages to find his phone and loads the picture of Cameron and Chas in bed together and presses 'Send'. Declan and Katie are about to cut the cake, but become involved in argument with Megan. Megan pushes Katie's face into the cake before leaving. Cameron finds Carl and picks up the brick that Chas used on him earlier, he tells Carl that he'll help him if he keeps quiet about the affair and leaves both him and Chas alone. The pair argue and Cameron hits Carl over the head in exactly the same spot that Chas did previously. Zak and Cain realise they've had a breakthrough with each other. Charity leaves Debbie's phone on her bedside table as she sleeps. Cameron is stunned to find Carl is dead and picks up his phone before fleeing the scene. As Debbie sleeps, six new messages come through on her phone.

== Cast ==
=== Regular cast ===
- Tom Lister as Carl King
- Liam Fox as Dan Spencer
- Lucy Pargeter as Chas Spencer
- Jason Merrells as Declan Macey
- Sammy Winward as Katie Macey
- Nick Miles as Jimmy King
- Dominic Power as Cameron Murray
- Sian Reese-Williams as Gennie Walker
- Rik Makarem as Nikhil Sharma
- Charley Webb as Debbie Dingle
- Steve Halliwell as Zak Dingle
- Jeff Hordley as Cain Dingle
- Tony Audenshaw as Bob Hope
- Mark Charnock as Marlon Dingle
- Natalie J. Robb as Moira Barton
- Andy Wear as Jude Watson
- Dominic Brunt as Paddy Kirk
- Zoe Henry as Rhona Goskirk
- Jane Cox as Lisa Dingle
- Charlotte Bellamy as Laurel Thomas
- Kelli Hollis as Ali Spencer
- Alicya Eyo as Ruby Haswell
- Luke Roskell as Sean Spencer
- Daisy Campbell as Amelia Spencer
- Shirley Stelfox as Edna Birch
- Elizabeth Estensen as Diane Sugden
- Emma Atkins as Charity Sharma
- Eden Taylor-Draper as Belle Dingle
- Gemma Oaten as Rachel Breckle
- Chris Bisson as Jai Sharma
- Nicola Wheeler as Nicola King
- Kelvin Fletcher as Andy Sugden
- Paula Tilbrook as Betty Eagleton
- Freddie Jones as Sandy Thomas
- Richard Thorp as Alan Turner
- Kurtis Stacey as Alex Moss
- Patrick Mower as Rodney Blackstock
- Matthew Wolfenden as David Metcalfe
- Isabel Hodgins as Victoria Sugden
- Adam Thomas as Adam Barton
- Bhasker Patel as Rishi Sharma
- Fiona Wade as Priya Sharma
- Gaynor Faye as Megan Macey
- James Hooton as Sam Dingle
- Laura Norton as Kerry Wyatt
- Chelsea Halfpenny as Amy Wyatt
- Chris Chittell as Eric Pollard
- Charlie Hardwick as Val Pollard
- Kitty McGeever as Lizzie Lakely
- John Middleton as Ashley Thomas
- Jamie Shelton as Robbie Lawson
- Louis Webster (uncredited) as Jack Sugden

=== Guest cast ===
- Deborah Bouchard as Paramedic
- Sue Devaney as Midwife
- Hip Operation as the Wedding Band

== Emmerdale Live: The Fallout (backstage show) ==
After the episode had been shown, Stephen Mulhern gave a backstage commentary on what happened during the live episode of Emmerdale. Mulhern interviewed cast members and "super-fans", as well as answering questions that the public had submitted via Facebook and Twitter during the episode.

This episode was broadcast straight after the live episode at 8 pm on ITV2, nationwide.

== Reception ==
The episode pulled in 8.84 million viewers (40.0%) at 7pm on ITV and 374,000 (1.7%) on +1 an hour later. The audience peaked at 9.15 million viewers in the final quarter-hour of the episode. The Backstage commentary Emmerdale Live: The Fallout special, attracted 1.59 million viewers (7.2%) at 8pm and 218,000 viewers (1.0%) on timeshift. The episode won "Best Single Episode" at the 2013 British Soap Awards. Sarah Bond of the Daily Mirror praised the storylines in her review of the episode.
