= List of Emmerdale characters =

Emmerdale is a British ITV television soap opera first broadcast on ITV on 16 October 1972. The following is a list of characters who currently appear in the programme, listed in order of first appearance. Some characters have been recast since their first appearance and other characters may have multiple actors sharing the role. In these cases, the most recent actor to portray the role is listed last.

== Present characters ==
=== Regular characters ===
Character	Actor(s)	Duration	Ref.
Robert Sugden	Richard Smith	1986–2005, 2009, 2014–2019, 2025–present	
Robert Sugden	Christopher Smith	1986–2005, 2009, 2014–2019, 2025–present	
Robert Sugden	Karl Davies	1986–2005, 2009, 2014–2019, 2025–present	
Robert Sugden	Ryan Hawley	1986–2005, 2009, 2014–2019, 2025–present	
Eric Pollard	Chris Chittell	1986–present	
Kim Tate	Claire King	1989–1999, 2018–present	
Victoria Sugden	Jessica Haywood	1994–present	
Victoria Sugden	Hannah Midgley	1994–present	
Victoria Sugden	Isabel Hodgins	1994–present	
Sam Dingle	James Hooton	1995–1998, 2000–present	
Joe Tate	Oliver Young	1995–2005, 2017–2018, 2024–present	
Joe Tate	Ned Porteous	1995–2005, 2017–2018, 2024–present	
Mandy Dingle	Lisa Riley	1995–2001, 2019–present	
Steve Marchant	Paul Opacic	1996–1999, 2026–present	
Marlon Dingle	Mark Charnock	1996–present	
Paddy Kirk	Dominic Brunt	1997–present	
Belle Dingle	James Mather	1998–present	
Belle Dingle	Emily Mather	1998–present	
Belle Dingle	Eden Taylor-Draper	1998–present	
Charity Dingle	Emma Atkins	2000–2005, 2009–present	
Cain Dingle	Jeff Hordley	2000–2006, 2009–present	
Bob Hope	Tony Audenshaw	2000–present	
Rodney Blackstock	Patrick Mower	2000–present	
Nicola King	Nicola Wheeler	2001–present	
Rhona Goskirk	Zoë Henry	2001–2002, 2010–present	
Gabby Thomas	Jemma Giles	2001–present	
Gabby Thomas	Annelise Manojlovic	2001–present	
Gabby Thomas	Rosie Bentham	2001–present	
Laurel Thomas	Charlotte Bellamy	2002–present	
Chas Dingle	Lucy Pargeter	2002–present	
Aaron Dingle	Danny Webb	2003–2004, 2006, 2008–2012, 2014–present	
Aaron Dingle	Danny Miller	2003–2004, 2006, 2008–2012, 2014–present	
Thomas King	Jack Ferguson	2004–2007, 2009–2010, 2012–2013, 2023–present	
Thomas King	Connor Hill	2004–2007, 2009–2010, 2012–2013, 2023–present	
Thomas King	Mark Flanagan	2004–2007, 2009–2010, 2012–2013, 2023–present	
Thomas King	James Chase	2004–2007, 2009–2010, 2012–2013, 2023–present	
Sadie King	Patsy Kensit	2004–2006, 2026–present	
Sarah Sugden	Lily-May Bartley	2005–present	
Sarah Sugden	Lucy Warren	2005–present	
Sarah Sugden	Amber Child-Cavill	2005–present	
Sarah Sugden	Sophia Amber Moore	2005–present	
Sarah Sugden	Katie Hill	2005–present	
Arthur Thomas	Billy Harrower	2007−present	
Arthur Thomas	Luis Townley	2007−present	
Arthur Thomas	Alfie Clarke	2007−present	
Moira Dingle	Natalie J. Robb	2009–present	
Matty Barton	Grace Cassidy	2009–2012, 2018–present	
Matty Barton	Ash Palmisciano	2009–2012, 2018–present	
Jai Sharma	Chris Bisson	2009–present	
Jacob Gallagher	Joe-Warren Plant	2010–present	
Kerry Wyatt	Laura Norton	2012–present	
Vanessa Woodfield	Michelle Hardwick	2012–2022, 2024–present	
Ross Barton	Michael Parr	2013–2018, 2024–present	
Liam Cavanagh	Jonny McPherson	2014–present	
April Windsor	Amelia Flanagan	2014−present	
Tracy Shankley	Amy Walsh	2014–present	
Lydia Dingle	Karen Blick	2016–present	
Graham Foster	Andrew Scarborough	2017–2020, 2026–present	
Ryan Stocks	James Moore	2018–present	
Manpreet Sharma	Rebecca Sarker	2018–present	
Billy Fletcher	Jay Kontzle	2018–present	
Bear Wolf	Joshua Richards	2019–present	
Mackenzie Boyd	Lawrence Robb	2020–present	
Charles Anderson	Kevin Mathurin	2020–present	
Mary Goskirk	Louise Jameson	2022–present	
Caleb Miligan	William Ash	2022–present	
Claudette Anderson	Flo Wilson	2023–present	
Ruby Miligan	Beth Cordingly	2024–present	
Dylan Penders	Fred Kettle	2025–present	
Kammy Hadiq	Shebz Miah	2025–present	
Lewis Barton	Bradley Riches	2025–present	
Kev Barton	Chris Coghill	2025–present	
Serena Sugden	Casey Al-Shaqsy	2026–present	
Thea Ramsden	Chelsea Edge	2026–present	

=== Recurring and guest characters ===
Character	Actor(s)	Duration	Ref.
PC Mike Swirling	Andy Moore	2004−present	
Angelica King	Sophie Firth	2009–present	
Angelica King	Rebecca Bakes	2009–present	
Elliot Windsor	Oliver Brooke	2011–2012, 2016–2024, 2026	
Elliot Windsor	Jackson Charles Cummins	2011–2012, 2016–2024, 2026	
Elliot Windsor	Luca Hoyle	2011–2012, 2016–2024, 2026	
Leo Goskirk	Theo Tasker	2011−present	
Leo Goskirk	Harry Whittaker	2011−present	
Leo Goskirk	Harvey Rogerson	2011−present	
Kyle Dingle	Molly Ainsworth	2011, 2013, 2015−present	
Kyle Dingle	Isaac Ainsworth	2011, 2013, 2015−present	
Kyle Dingle	Huey Quinn	2011, 2013, 2015−present	
Archie Breckle	Liyana Shahzad	2012−2015, 2019−present	
Archie Breckle	Aadam Wahab Shahzad	2012−2015, 2019−present	
Archie Breckle	Kai Assi	2012−2015, 2019−present	
Carl Holliday	Charlie Munro Joyce	2014, 2016–present	
Moses Dingle	Arthur Cockroft	2015−present	
Johnny Woodfield	Luca Hepworth	2015–2022, 2024–present	
Johnny Woodfield	Jack Jennings	2015–2022, 2024–present	
Dotty Thomas	Ellerie Carroll	2016−present	
Dotty Thomas	Tilly-Rue Foster	2016−present	
Isaac Dingle	Harvey Brook	2017−present	
Isaac Dingle	Elias Walker	2017−present	
Isaac Dingle	Bobby Dunsmoir	2017−present	
Lucas Taylor	Dexter Ansell	2019−present	
Lucas Taylor	Noah Ryan Aspinall	2019−present	
Eve Dingle	Billy Clement	2019−present	
Eve Dingle	Bonnie Clement	2019−present	
Eve Dingle	Bella James	2019−present	
Harry Sugden	Teddy Hall	2020−present	
Harry Sugden	Brody Hall	2020−present	
Harry Sugden	Adam Pryor	2020−present	
Frankie Robinson	Eden Ratcliffe-Knights	2021–present	
Thomas Tate	Bertie Brotherton	2021–present	
Clemmie Reed	Mabel Addison	2022–present	
Ivy Malcolms	Alice Mauve	2023–present	
Evan Fletcher	Malachi McKenzie	2023–present	
Leyla Sugden	Uncredited	2026–present	
William Tate	Uncredited	2026–present	

== Cast changes ==
=== Departing characters ===
Character	Actor	Ref.
Sadie King	Patsy Kensit	

== Lists of characters by year of introduction ==
- 1972–1973
- 1974–1975
- 1977
- 1978–1979
- 1982–1983
- 1988
- 1989
- 1990
- 1991
- 1993
- 1994
- 1995
- 1996
- 1997
- 1998
- 1999
- 2000
- 2001
- 2002
- 2003
- 2004
- 2005
- 2006
- 2007
- 2008
- 2009
- 2010
- 2011
- 2012
- 2013
- 2014
- 2015
- 2016
- 2017
- 2018
- 2019
- 2020
- 2021
- 2022
- 2023
- 2024
- 2025
- 2026
