= Leanna Cavanagh =

Fictional character from Emmerdale

- Emmerdale character
- Portrayed by: Mimi Slinger
- Duration: 2018–2021
- First appearance: Episode 8087; 6 March 2018
- Last appearance: Episode 9096; 9 July 2021
- Introduced by: Iain MacLeod
In-universe information
- Father: Liam Cavanagh
- Mother: Lara Cavanagh
- Stepmother: Maya Stepney; Leyla Harding

Leanna Cavanagh is a fictional character from the ITV soap opera Emmerdale, played by Mimi Slinger. Leanna was introduced as the troublesome daughter of Liam Cavanagh (Jonny McPherson) when producers made the decision to explore Liam's character. After making her first appearance on 6 March 2018, her storylines in the soap included her numerous rivalries with her father's partners, her friendship and eventual rivalry with Gabby Thomas (Rosie Bentham), and her on-off relationship with Jacob Gallagher (Joe-Warren Plant). The character was killed off in the episode airing on 8 July 2021 when she is murdered by serial killer Meena Jutla (Paige Sandhu).

Slinger announced her decision to leave to the production team in 2020 and was informed that her character would die, which she was shocked but excited for. It was announced in June 2021 that Meena would kill a character and viewers of the show immediately suspected that it would be Leanna. To film her death scenes in the COVID-19 pandemic with Sandhu, they formed a bubble, which she felt made the scenes more realistic. Upon leaving, Slinger said that she was missing Emmerdale and her co-stars, but felt it was the right time to pursue other opportunities in her career.

Leanna is initially portrayed as a mean and harsh character, with Slinger admitting that she would not be friends with her character. However, her backstory is later explored when it is revealed that her mother died when Leanna was a child. Due to having experienced the loss of her mother at a young age, Leanna takes out her feelings on people surrounding her, without regard for their feelings. Her attitude was initially criticised by viewers, but her impact on the series has been noted by OK! magazine. After Leanna was murdered, viewers were "sickened" and "stunned" by her death.

== Casting and characterisation ==
In 2018, it was announced by the agents of Jonny McPherson that his character, Liam Cavanagh, had been promoted to a series regular on Emmerdale. As part of the decision to promote him, it was confirmed that viewers would find out more about his life, with the producers having "bigger plans for him in the months ahead". One of these explorations was the introduction of Leanna, as well as Liam's wife, Maya Stepney (Louisa Clein). In an interview with Susannah Alexander of Digital Spy, Slinger stated that the "proudest moment" of her life was the day that her mother called her to inform her that she had landed the role of Leanna.

Speaking to Alexander about her character, Slinger described Leanna as a troublemaker and stated that she loves the attention that comes from being that way. Slinger opined that Leanna is "that stereotypical mean girl who creates drama to keep her position". She admitted that while in real life she could "be a bit cheeky on occasion", she is not like her character. Slinger stated that she would not personally be friends with Leanna if she was a real person, stating that "Leanna and people like her would definitely be the sort that [she would] steer away from", and that she would find it "difficult" to get along with her. Slinger explained that Leanna has a "hard exterior" due to events in her backstory, which causes her to be too harsh to people and not regard their feelings. Leanna's backstory involves her mother Lara's death at a young age, which led her to not have a mother figure throughout her formative years. A year later, Slinger compared the attributes that she shares with Leanna, explaining that they both value the people they love, they are both sensitive and that they both enjoy taking risks. She also admitted that she does not like Leanna's clothing.

== Development ==
=== Relationship with Jacob Gallagher ===
Shortly after her introduction, Leanna is "quick to find romance" when she is partnered with classmate Jacob Gallagher (Joe-Warren Plant) for a school project. After Jacob hears Leanna making spiteful comments, he decides to stop talking to her, with Metro stating that he "has understandably been put off". However, the pair "grow closer" after the pair share a kiss and she "nervously unbuttons her shirt". The pair have sex, and Leanna takes the morning-after pill. She tells her father that despite the pair having sex, Jacob "just did it to make himself feel better" and has no interest in her. Liam assumes that Jacob has taken advantage of Leanna, and confronts him. In turn, Jacob "lashes out with a number of nasty comments" about Leanna. The pair eventually reconcile and agree to be "exclusive" with one another.

In 2021, Emmerdale producers announced that the year would see an increased focus on the younger cast members and characters. As part of the shift, an arc for Leanna's character was announced. It was confirmed that with Jacob having moved abroad and her friendship with Gabby Thomas (Rosie Bentham) "in chaos", Leanna would be lonely. Slinger stated that Leanna has "found herself quite isolated" due to the change in company, and that Leanna will question "whether their relationship is strong enough to last the distance". After his return, Slinger was asked if they make a good couple. She opined that they do but admitted that they would be unlikely to last in the long-term future. She hoped that they would keep her bond with Jacob, since she enjoyed working with Warren-Plant.

=== Troublemaking and scheming ===
When 11-year-old Amelia Spencer (Daisy Campbell) goes missing, Leanna calls her family. She hints that she has information on Amelia's disappearance, but that she would only divulge the information for a reward. She then jokes that Amelia will return soon, but in a coffin. Metro suggested that rather than just wanting a reward, Leanna could be involved with Amelia's disappearance. Leanna instigates a series of pranks, enlisting Amelia and Noah Dingle (Jack Downham) to help her. They begin by flooding the school toilets to get time off from school and then release a number of animals from the local vets. Leanna then finds the key to Daz Spencer's (Mark Jordon) car, and go joyriding in it. Leanna sets Amelia up for the crime by videoing her in the car. Amelia pulls Leanna's hair, causing her to crash, and the teens leave the car. A drunk Daz finds the car, and drives it, where he hits Graham Foster (Andrew Scarborough). Noah confesses to the police, but as Leanna is "desperate to save her own skin", she denies everything, claiming Amelia is responsible.

When she is upset about her life, Leanna "decides to ignore all of the emotional stuff" to "numb the pain". She forms "a new plan to rebel" by organising a party at Diane Sugden's (Elizabeth Estensen) house. Jacob sees her posts on social media advertising the party and arrives to comfort her. Liam arrives, and misinterprets the situation by assuming they are about to have sex. Liam's words then "further push away his daughter". After Gabby leads Leyla to believe Liam has groomed her, Leanna plans revenge on her by starting a "smear campaign" against her. Daniel Kilkelly of Digital Spy wrote that she intends to "settle the score" with Gabby. She then "steps up [her] revenge plan, planning to get Gabby fired from her new job as a waitress. She becomes determined to ensure that Gabby faces consequences for her actions against Liam, and asks Leyla Harding (Roxy Shahidi) to join in, who declines. Leanna "goes solo" and becomes the "customer from hell".

=== Rivalries with her father's partners ===
When Leanna arrives in Emmerdale, she is accompanied by stepmother Maya, Liam's wife. However, Maya cheats on her father with David Metcalfe (Matthew Wolfenden), Jacob's adoptive father. Leanna is "furious" when she learns that Maya has warned Jacob to stay away from her. She brands Maya a "lying, gold-digging cow", and prints flyers insulting her. Leanna posts about Maya online, as well as distributing the flyers around the local area. Her actions result in a confrontation between the two in which "sparks flew". Maya was tipped by Digital Spy to be Emmerdale's next villain, with them accrediting her potential as a villain to Leanna's "evil streak". They suspected that due to "causing a right old stir with her bad behaviour", this could be a sign that Maya is "the malevolent influence" of Leanna's behaviour. When Maya later grooms Jacob, Leanna was tipped by the Daily Mirror to expose her due to the pair never getting along.

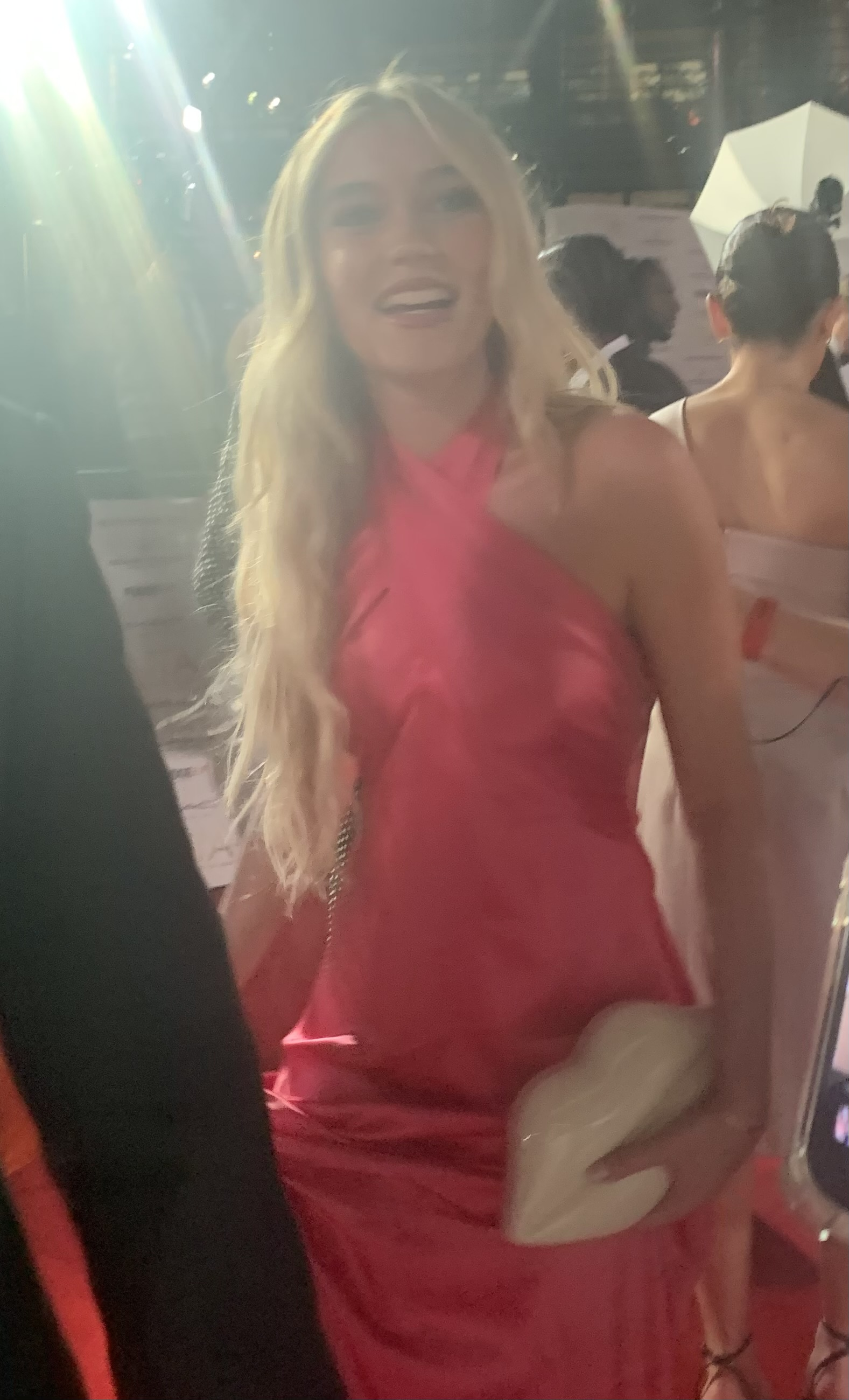
Slinger has said that Liam's brief relationships with women result in little stability for Leanna.

Liam begins a relationship with Bernice, who Leanna takes an instant dislike to. Digital Spy wrote that in response to their relationship, Leanna "hatches a ruthless plan to destroy" it. She teams up with Bernice's daughter and "willing accomplice" Gabby Thomas (Rosie Bentham). Leanna tricks Bernice into wearing an "awful ball gown" to the Woolpack, humiliating her in front of Liam and other villagers. Leanna is pleased when Liam sides with her. Despite this, the pair continue their relationship. After Leanna has sex with Jacob, Bernice buys the morning-after pill for her. Bernice does not tell Liam, since she wants to respect Leanna's privacy as a teenage girl. The secret is then revealed when Leanna vomits in front of Liam. Due to "sly remarks" that Leanna makes about her, Bernice buys Botox from the internet. She "spitefully" encourages her to use the Botox, but after Bernice has an anaphylactic shock due to being severely allergic to the ingredients, Leanna shows "genuine remorse". It was then confirmed by producers that Leanna's "surprising" and "sad backstory" would be explored in scenes. McPherson (Liam) stated that Leanna is a troubled character, but that the storyline with Bernice's anaphylactic shock would show Leanna in a different light. He explained that Leanna's mother Lara died of an anaphylactic shock, so it "will bring stuff back for Leanna". McPherson said that the viewers will see why Leanna behaves the way she does, and that despite some of her actions being bad, she is not "pure evil". Giles (Bernice) liked that the storyline led to her character and Leanna being "able to build some bridges". She felt that since Leanna feels genuine remorse, it will bring them closer. Giles added that there is potential for Bernice to be a good stepmother to her, but only if Leanna's "fractious" relationship with her daughter Gabby improves. The pair eventually break up when Liam kisses Leyla Harding (Roxy Shahidi); Slinger opined that if Liam were to have stayed with Bernice, Leanna would be happy since she "would've had the ready-made family she longs for".

When Liam begins a relationship with Leyla, he receives "backlash" from Leanna. Since Leanna "hasn't made life easy for Liam in the past when it comes to his relationships", he sees telling Leanna about their relationship as an "obstacle". Leanna does not react well to the news, and they explain their relationship to her, but she "remains dismissive" and upset over the situation. She then attempts to ruin their relationship by giving him the "huge ultimatum" of choosing her or Leyla. Daniel Kilkelly of Digital Spy wrote that Leanna is stubbornly refusing to accept their relationship "partly because she feels left out". Slinger explained that Liam's relationship with Leyla is difficult for Leanna since it makes her feel neglected. Leanna wants to be acknowledged by Liam, and for him to show his love for her. Slinger disagreed with her character's actions, opining that although Leanna wants Liam to be happy, she is seeming to "destroy any hope of that". After Leyla's wedding business is vandalised, she suspects Leanna of being responsible for the damage. After being patient with Leanna's schemes against her, Leyla "finally loses it with Leanna". Kilkelly (Digital Spy) wrote that the pair would be "set for a fiery showdown". Slinger stated that due to her troublemaking nature, "all eyes are on Leanna", but Kilkelly suspected that she would not be responsible for the crime. The pair argue, and Leyla slaps Leanna. Leanna explains the situation to Liam and opens up to him. She tells him that she does not feel like she has a family anymore, and that she is not Liam's priority. He breaks up with Leyla, and Amy West of Digital Spy stated that Leanna has "finally got what she wanted". However, after their breakup, Leanna sees that Liam is lonely as a single man. She then "hatches a plan" to get them back together.

Slinger explained that Liam's short-term relationships with women such as Maya, Bernice and Leyla "result in little stability for Leanna", and touched upon how Leanna "doesn't even have a family home". Slinger concluded by opining that Leanna is never Liam's priority, which is what her character wants.

=== Death ===
On 28 June 2021, it was confirmed by Emmerdale that villain Meena Jutla (Paige Sandhu) would murder a character in forthcoming scenes. That same day, a trailer involving Meena, Leanna, Jacob, Gabby, David Metcalfe (Matthew Wolfenden) and Victoria Sugden (Isabel Hodgins) premiered on ITV, with media outlets confirming that the latter five would be the potential victims of her murder. Viewers immediately suspected that Meena would kill Leanna, accrediting Meena's motive to Leanna receiving a rucksack filled with suspicious items belonging to Meena. Slinger addressed the possibility of it being her character by stating that Leanna does not realise she is in danger with Meena. She explained that the two have built up a friendship and that she is "completely oblivious to Meena's dark side". In an episode broadcast on 8 July 2021, Leanna discovers that Meena stole money from the gay pride collection in the village and tried to frame Jacob, as well as learning Meena murdered her best friend Nadine. Leanna tries to escape but is confronted by her on a bridge, which Meena throws her from.

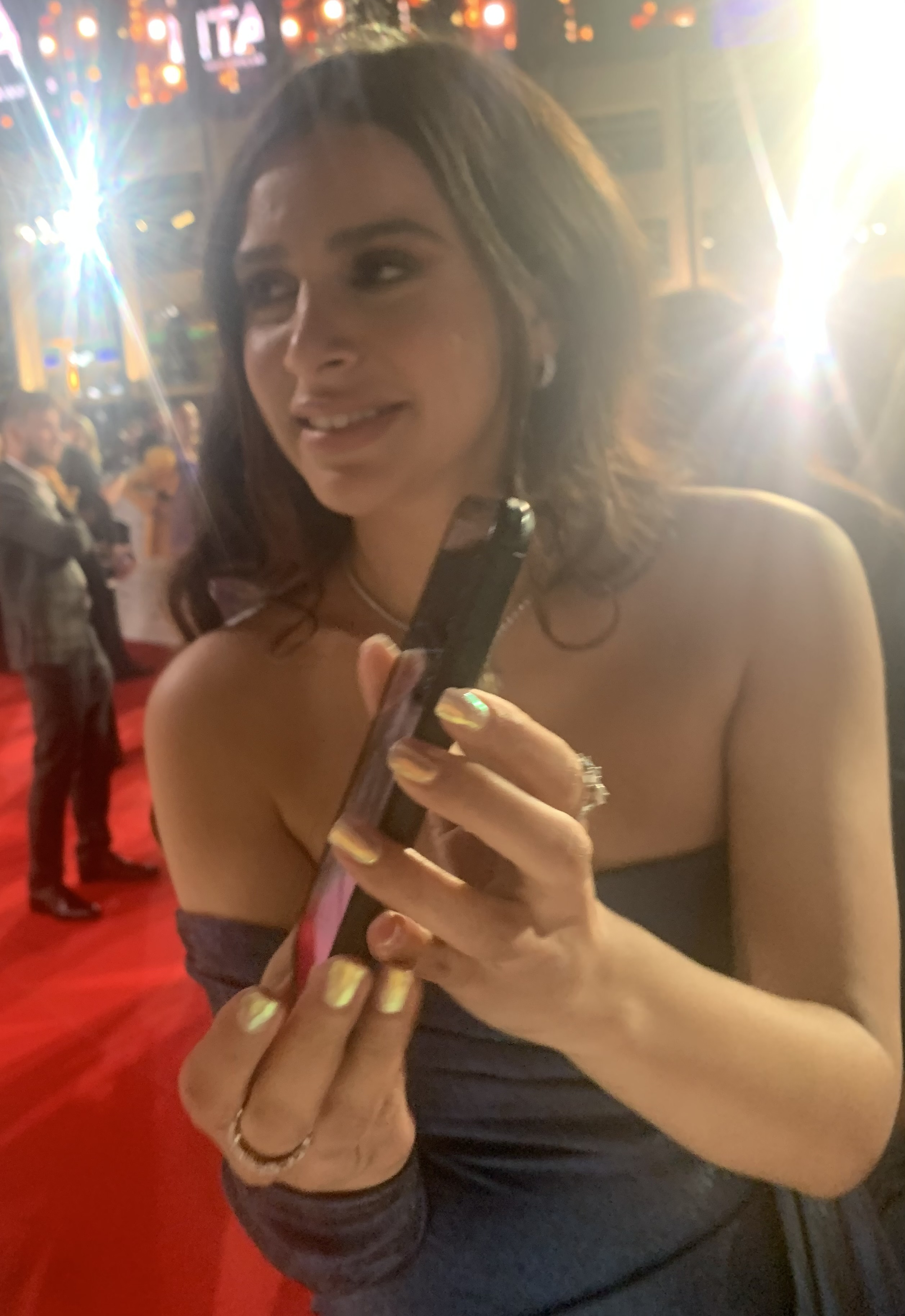
Amidst the COVID-19 pandemic, Slinger formed a bubble with Paige Sandhu (pictured) to film Leanna's death scenes.

Slinger revealed that she announced her decision to leave the soap to the production team in 2020. Afterwards, executive producer Jane Hudson informed her in December 2020 that Leanna would die. She was shocked about the storyline, but was pleased "to be given the opportunity to be challenged and show [her] acting abilities". Slinger found filming her final scenes on Emmerdale emotional, particularly with McPherson, with whom she said that she shared "lots of tears" with. She also enjoyed her scenes with Sandhu, noting that her ability to play a psychopath was scarily good. Slinger had to do a few stunts in order to film Leanna's death and revealed that herself and Sandhu required a stunt co-ordinator on set. She joked that since Leanna falls 40 feet from a bridge, she required a stunt double for that scene. Due to the impact of the COVID-19 pandemic on television, cast and crew members on Emmerdale were not allowed within 6 feet of each other at the time of filming. However, since Leanna and Meena had to be closer than 6 feet, the two actresses formed a bubble. This included isolating in a hotel for a number of days and taking regular COVID tests. Slinger was happy to have made the effort to bubble with Sandhu since it made the scenes "feel as real and raw as possible".

Slinger's last day of filming was unplanned since they had to abandon plans to film in the village due to torrential rain. She was then called in on her father's birthday to film the scenes of Leanna lying dead in the river. After filming had wrapped, director Paul Copeland made a speech and Slinger was given gifts by the production team. Reflecting on her experience on Emmerdale, Slinger stated that the time had "flown by" but that she was glad to have learned from her fellow cast members, directors and producers. When asked if she would miss her co-stars, she replied that she was already missing them by the time her exit aired in July, since she completed her filming in May 2021. She accredited McPherson and Shahidi with teaching her a lot about acting and mentioned Campbell and Bentham, with whom she formed friendships with. The actress concluded by stating that although she would miss Emmerdale, it felt like the right time for her to depart and explore other opportunities. She felt "grateful to say [she] was part of the Emmerdale family" and appreciated the memories she had made while on the soap, and thanked Leanna's fans for supporting her time on the soap.

== Reception ==
In scenes aired in June 2018, viewers "slammed" Leanna for her actions after she demands a reward for information about Amelia's disappearance. She was described as "horrible" and a "devil child", and was compared to Gabby, her on-screen frenemy. Then when Leanna then joked about Amelia's disappearance, viewers "reacted strongly" to the character, with Digital Spy stating that "viewers at home did not respond well to [her] remark". Viewers stated that they felt sorry for Slinger, due to the "floods of hate" she might receive for the hatred of her character. Leanna was branded as "evil", "vile" and a "horrible little bitch". OK! magazine labelled her a "troublemaker", but stated that she had "made her impact on the Dales with some hard-hitting storylines". Digital Spy wrote that Leanna's "harsh comments and diva attitude" had been the focus of viewership in 2018, and that her actions have "hardly in the good graces of viewers". After scenes of her arguing with Maya aired, viewers suspected that Leanna's "horrible" attitude was caused by Maya. They opined that she is looking out for her father, and that Leanna's distrust and dislike of Maya was "foreshadowing" a twist. Digital Spy echoed the comments when they sensed that her "wild claims" about Maya may be true. Viewers of Emmerdale were "sickened" by her death.
