= Gabby Thomas (disambiguation) =

Gabby Thomas may refer to:

- Gabby Thomas, American track and field athlete, Olympic gold medalist in the 200m
- Gabby Thomas (Emmerdale), a character on the British soap opera Emmerdale
