= Louisa Clein =

British actress

- Born: 6 July 1979 (age 46); Poole, Dorset, England
- Education: Drama Centre London
- Occupation: Actress
- Years active: 2000–present
- Notable work: Judge John Deed; Emmerdale
- Spouse: Jeremy Brier KC (m. 2011)
- Children: 3
- Relatives: Natalie Clein (sister)

Louisa Clein (born 6 July 1979) is a British actress, known for playing Maya Stepney in the ITV soap opera Emmerdale.

== Life and career ==
Clein was born in Poole, Dorset to Jewish parents, Peter and Channa Clein (née Salomonson). Her mother is from Amsterdam, Netherlands and is a professional violinist. Her father is a doctor. She has a sister called Natalie, a professional cellist. She attended Talbot Heath School in Bournemouth, Dorset.

In 2001, Clein made her television debut as Charlie Deed in the BBC series Judge John Deed, which ran until 2007. She has also appeared in shows such as Holby City, Doctors, Casualty, New Tricks, Midsomer Murders, Fanny Hill and played the role of Zelda Kay in ITV's Island at War in 2004.

In 2002, Clein appeared with her sister Natalie at the Holocaust Memorial Day concert and read extracts from her cousin Julia Pascal's Holocaust Trilogy.

Clein's theatre performances have included A Midsummer Night's Dream, My Children, My Africa! and The Lady from the Sea. Her performance as Hilda in The Lady from the Sea earned her second place in the Ian Charleson Award. Clein also received critical acclaim for her 2005 performance as Anna in The Rubinstein Kiss. In 2006, Clein assumed the role of the radical pianist Harriet Cohen in Dearest Tania scripted by Duncan Honeybourne. She performed in the Almeida Theatre's 2008 production of Waste. In summer 2009, Clein performed in the Sylvia Plath play Three Women at the Edinburgh Festival. In 2010, Clein toured in an adaptation of the Oscar Wilde story Lord Arthur Savile's Crime as Sybil Merton with Lee Mead as her leading man, Lord Arthur. In July 2010, Clein starred in The Railway Children in the former Waterloo Eurostar Terminal in London, and at King's Cross Theatre in 2015. During 2015 and 2016, she starred in City Stories at both the St. James Theatre, London, and 59E59 Theaters in New York City.

In March 2018, Clein began playing Maya Stepney in the ITV soap opera Emmerdale. Her storylines in the series have included splitting up with Dr Liam Cavanagh (Jonny McPherson), her rivalry with Leanna Cavanagh (Mimi Slinger), getting into a relationship with David Metcalfe (Matthew Wolfenden) and grooming David's son, Jacob Gallagher (Joe-Warren Plant). Upon the conclusion of the grooming storyline, it was announced that Clein would be leaving Emmerdale. Her exit from the series aired on 19 November 2019. At the 2019 Inside Soap Awards, Clein received the award for Best Bad Girl.

In 2022, she appeared at the Royal Court Theatre in "Jews in their Own Words", playing the parts of Luciana Berger MP and Tracy-Ann Oberman.

In 2023, she played a violinist in the short film The One Note Man.

In February 2024, Clein was scheduled to interview pro-Israel activist Douglas Murray at the Apollo Theatre in London, but it was cancelled at the eleventh hour after staff refused to work there. Later that year, Clein was part of the cast of the West End venue for "Letters, Lights and Love", which served as a fundraiser for the reconstruction of Kibbutz Be'eri following the October 7 attacks, during which 120 of its residents were killed. The venue raised £960,000 for the rebuilding of kindergartens, nursery and playgrounds.
