= Tom Lister (actor) =

English actor

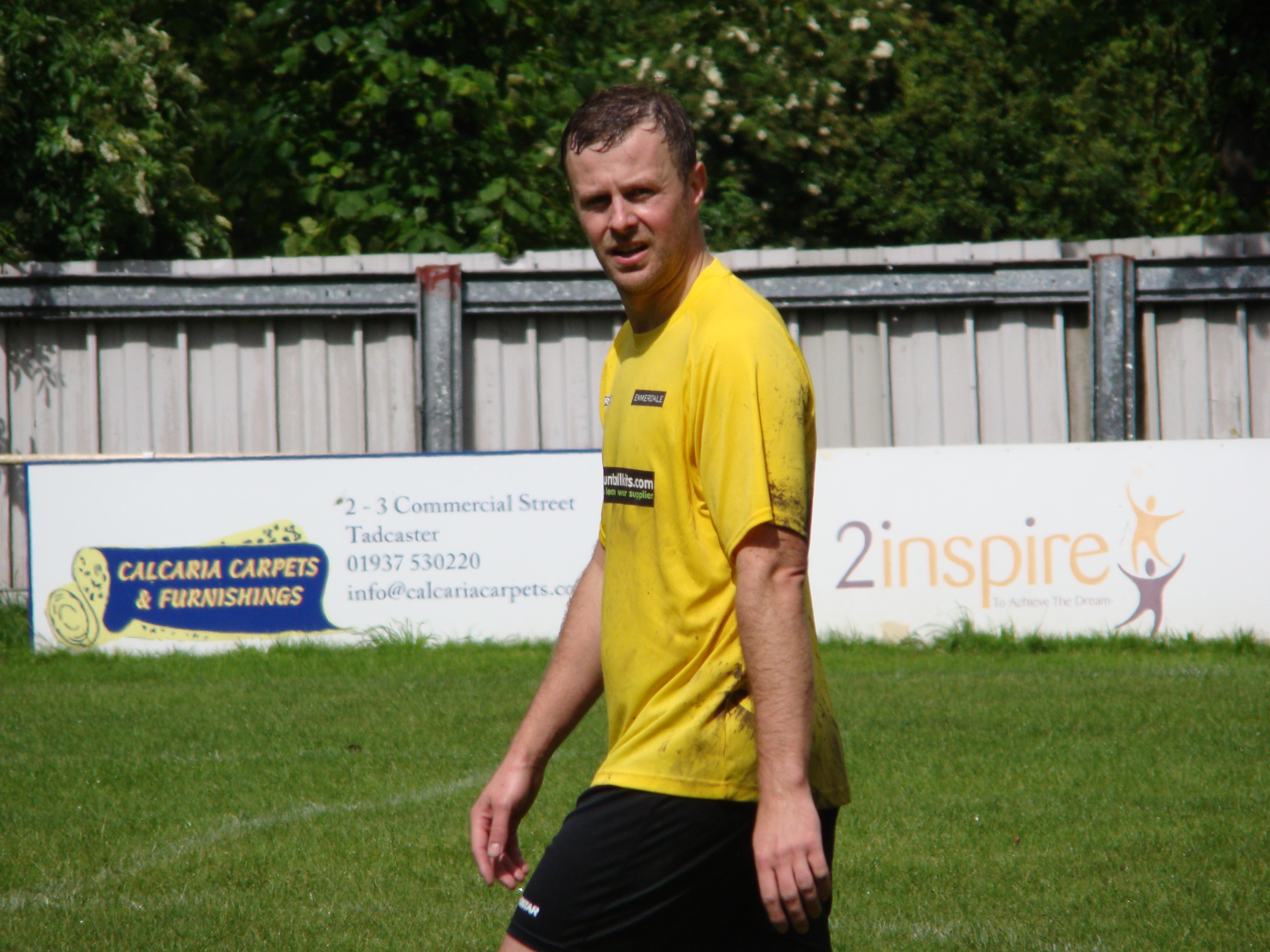
- Born: Thomas Brown; 21 June 1978 (age 48); Ingleton, North Yorkshire, England
- Occupation: Actor
- Years active: 1999–present
- Spouse: Jennifer Humpage (m. 2004)
- Children: 2

Tom Lister (born Thomas Brown; 21 June 1978) is an English actor, known for his roles as Carl King in Emmerdale from 2004 to 2012, Harry Wainwright in Heartbeat and Rob Ingram in The Bill.

== Early and personal life ==
Lister was born as Thomas Brown, but took on his mother's maiden name when acting to avoid confusion with another actor under the name of Tom Brown. He is married to secondary school headteacher Jennifer Humpage and they have two sons. Lister is a Christian. He studied at Birmingham School of Acting (BSA) for three years and graduated in 2001.

== Career ==
Lister began his career making appearances in series including Heartbeat, Doctors and The Bill. In February 2004, he made his debut appearance on the ITV soap opera Emmerdale as Carl King, a role he maintained for eight years until his departure on 18 October 2012. Lister appeared alongside his Emmerdale co-stars Lucy Pargeter, Nick Miles, Kelsey-Beth Crossley and Nicola Wheeler as the King family in a special episode of All Star Family Fortunes, playing against Coronation Street's Webster family and winning. He also appeared as singer Jamie Cullum in Stars In Their Eyes.

=== Stage roles ===
Later in 2012, Lister appeared as Captain Hook in the Sunderland Empire pantomime, Peter Pan. He made his musical theatre debut in the world premiere of The Water Babies at the Curve in Leicester on 24 April 2014 as Grimes. In 2014, Lister toured the UK as Wild Bill Hickok in the musical Calamity Jane. A few years later, he appeared in a West End revival of 42nd Street.

== Filmography ==
- Shifting Units (1999) (credited as Tom Brown) as Sales Office Team Member
- Heartbeat (2002) as Harry Wainwright
- Doctors (2002) as Andy Mills
- The Bill (2002) as Rob Ingram
- Emmerdale (2004–2012) as Carl King
- Doctors (2016) as Martin Laws
- Doctors (2020–2021) as Simon Robson
- West End In Blackpool (2021) as Self
- Passenger (2024) as Nick

== Awards and nominations ==
Year	Award	Category	Work	Result	Ref.
2012	2012 British Soap Awards	Villain of the Year	Emmerdale	Nominated	
2013	2013 British Soap Awards	Villain of the Year	Emmerdale	Nominated	
2013	2013 British Soap Awards	Best Exit	Emmerdale	Nominated	
