= Gabby Thomas (Emmerdale) =

Fictional character from Emmerdale

Gabby Dingle
- Emmerdale character
- Rosie Bentham as Gabby Thomas
- Portrayed by: Jemma Giles (2001–2002); Annelise Manojlovic (2001–2015); Rosie Bentham (2016–present)
- Duration: 2001–present
- First appearance: Episode 3076; 25 December 2001
- Introduced by: Keith Richardson
In-universe information
- Occupation: Wedding planner Waitress
- Father: Ashley Thomas
- Mother: Bernice Blackstock
- Stepfather: Lawrence White
- Stepmother: Laurel Thomas
- Half-brothers: Arthur Thomas
- Half-sisters: Dee Dee; Dotty Thomas
- Husband: Vinny Dingle (2025–2026)
- Sons: Thomas Tate
- Grandfathers: Rodney Blackstock; Sandy Thomas
- Grandmothers: Diane Sugden; Dorothy Thomas
- Uncles: Luke Thomas
- Aunts: Nicola King; Karen Thomas
- First cousins: Jasmine Thomas; Angelica King
- Other relatives: Val Pollard; Paul Lambert; Sharon Lambert

Gabby Thomas is a fictional character from the British ITV soap opera Emmerdale. She made her first appearance on 25 December 2001. She was played by Annelise Manojlovic from birth in 2001 until 2015, with the role alternating with Jemma Giles until 2002. The role was recast in 2016 to Rosie Bentham. Bentham took a break from the series in 2017 and was off-screen between 17 April and 22 September.

Gabby is the daughter of Ashley Thomas (John Middleton) and Bernice Blackstock (Samantha Giles), the stepdaughter of Laurel Thomas (Charlotte Bellamy) and Lawrence White (John Bowe) and half-sister to Arthur Thomas (Alfie Clarke) and Dotty Thomas. Gabby's storylines have included her mother Bernice coming in and out of her life, dealing with her father and stepmother's break up and them eventually reconciling, learning that her father has dementia and dealing with his death, her teenage rebellion and becoming a teenage parent.

== Casting ==
From the character's birth, Gabby was played by both Annelise Manojlovic and Jemma Giles, however, Manojlovic continued as Gabby until 2015. The character was recast to Rosie Bentham and she appeared from January 2016. Of her casting, Bentham said, "I was out shopping with my mate when I found out I'd got the role. I was jumping around in Boots. It was amazing. I went up to Leeds four times because of call backs. I knew I was down to the last five but I wasn't really expecting to get it. It was incredible when I found out. It's a bit weird, but I had been watching Gabby before I started going up there to see what I could find out about her character." Bentham stated that Lucy Pargeter, who plays Chas Dingle and James Hooton, who plays Sam Dingle, helped her as, like Bentham, they attended Television Workshop. She stated: "I couldn't wish for better people to work with. It sounds like a cliche but we're all one big family." She also added: "It was a bit of a shock for people when I first appeared as Gabby. It happens a lot in television and people get used to it. I just took it as 'I'm not playing this character' and didn't really think about whatever had happened in the past." Bentham was chaperoned by her parents whilst she was young.

== Development ==
=== Early development ===
In 2012, Giles reprised her role of Bernice. Giles said that Bernice thinks Gabby will enjoy spending time with her, but will have thought little about the "hard time" Gabby has endured with Ashley and Laurel's marriage breakdown. Upon Laurel embarking a relationship with Marlon, Gabby takes "a real dislike" to Marlon as she views him as the one who has ruined her family, so she claims Marlon assaulted her when an upset Gabby witnesses Laurel and Marlon kissing. Bellamy said Laurel is "very upset" when Gabby admits to lying and chooses to live with Ashley, since Laurel views Gabby as her own daughter.

=== Ashley's dementia and death ===
In 2015, it was announced Middleton would be leaving Emmerdale with Ashley being diagnosed with dementia. Ashley "desperately tried to put off the terrible prospect" of telling Gabby and Arthur the truth. Bellamy explained the sad scene where Ashley tells the children over a picnic. When a "wayward" Gabby breaks into Victoria's house, resulting in her being injured, and steals Sandy's pension, she "hatches a cruel plan against" Ashley when he reports her for robbery by reporting him for assault. The allegation causes a rift between Gabby and Ashley as Ashley will not apologise and Gabby is "determined not to back down either."

Gabby is devastated when she feels denied of the chance to say goodbye to Ashley privately when he dies. Producer Iain MacLeod explained that despite the crushing extra blow for Gabby that was added in to make the story more realistic, she will come to realise that Ashley knew she loved him. MacLeod confirmed that the story would see Gabby "go off the rails", but the intention was to "tell a simple story about a grief experience that a lot of people might recognise". Middleton praised Bentham, calling her "a lovely young woman" and said that he is proud of her and Clarke for their parts in the storyline. Following the conclusion of the storyline, Gabby was temporarily written out of the soap since Bentham was taking her GCSE exams in real life.

=== Loneliness and obsession with Leyla Harding ===
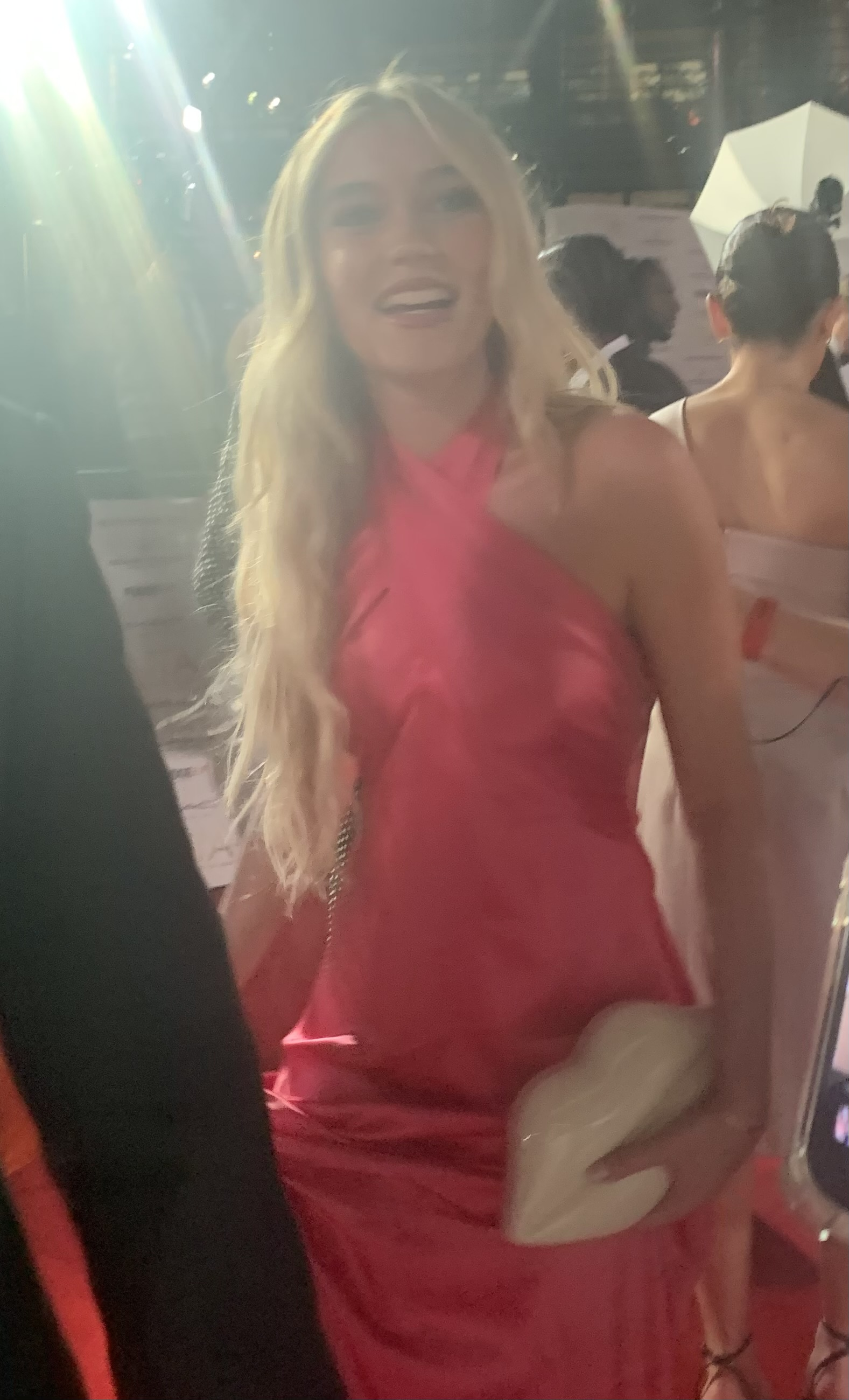
Gabby feels lonely after Leanna Cavanagh (Mimi Slinger, pictured) starts dating Jacob.

After Bernice leaves the country, Laurel and Diane ignore her more and friend Leanna gets into a relationship,. This saw Gabby's loneliness explored in 2020. Daniel Kilkelly of Digital Spy described the situation as Gabby feeling as though people around her are distracted due to prioritising other things. The storyline sees Gabby taking out her anger on Leyla, since she blames her for breaking Bernice and Liam up. Gabby stalks Leyla and later vandalises her business. Shahidi, who portrayed Leyla, stated that when she discovers that the stalker is Gabby, "given the right set of circumstances, [Leyla] can be very empathetic, she can be a very forgiving and understanding person", and Leyla responds to the discovery by offering Gabby an apprenticeship at her business. Kilkelly noted that this is "the fresh start Gabby needed".

After Leyla reveals that she is going to Ibiza for work but is not taking Gabby, as well as Laurel going on holiday with boyfriend Jai Sharma (Chris Bisson) without her, Gabby's actions "spark concern" when she gets drunk. Gabby then decides to break Leyla and Liam up by making it seem as though he is having an affair with Meena. Speaking on her character's plan, Bentham explained that Gabby wants all of Leyla's attention. She described Gabby as a "troubled teen going through a lot of changes" who sees her friendship with Leyla as the most important thing to her. Bentham stated that Gabby sees Meena as a "pawn piece" and that she is seeking an "explosion" with her plan. When Leyla confides in Gabby following the breakup, Bentham affirms that it is "exactly what Gabby wanted". When Bentham was asked why Gabby was doing this, she answered: "Gabby has no-one else in the village. She had that situation in the cricket pavilion where she poured out all of her emotions to Leyla and she has never done that to many people before. Gabby really needed that. Fans' reactions have been very interesting over what they think is going on. But I think Gabby just craves attention as a teenage girl and she hasn't got her mum there, which is really tough." She compared the storyline to the 1992 film Single White Female, adding that Gabby sees Leyla as an idol, leading to her copying Leyla's mannerisms and style. She added that it was more relative to a sisterly or motherly relationship as opposed to a romantic crush. The fixation with Leyla concludes after her actions are discovered, with Leanna stating a "smear campaign" against Gabby.

=== Involvement with the Tate family ===
In January 2021, it was announced that 2021 would have a large focus on the younger characters of Emmerdale, including Gabby. Details of a storyline that see Gabby become involved with the Tate family were announced, with Claire Crick of What's on TV hinting that Gabby could be set to become "the next Kim Tate". Bentham stated that Gabby sets her sights on Home Farm, the largest property in the village, owned by Kim. She expressed her excitement at her character being "at the heart of the village" and involved in such a major storyline and confirmed that 2021 would be the most dramatic year for her character. Bentham joked: "if Gabby is hoping 2021 is going to be a more settled year, she can think again". Producers confirmed that the storyline will be "huge", with producer Sophie Roper explaining that "a fight for power will quickly ensue" after Gabby discovers that she is pregnant with Jamie Tate's baby. Roper noted that Gabby would find herself "at the centre of a family at war" and hinted that Gabby could either "succumb to the manipulations at Home Farm" or could end up in charge. In order to place distance between Jamie and love interest Dawn, Gabby gets her fired, which Kim appreciates since she does not like Dawn. Producers confirmed that they would develop an alliance between Gabby and Kim, with Kim's portrayer King explaining that Kim sees potential in Gabby. King explained that Kim believes she can manipulate Gabby into being an accomplice for her, seeing her younger self in Gabby. King also noted that Kim will try to push Gabby and Jamie to be a couple, since she believes they would be good together. King said that Kim could be underestimating Gabby, and that Kim could become a victim to Gabby's manipulation, explaining: "Kim senses that Gabby has this edge to her – she's not just intelligent, but she has a little dangerous side as well. I think Kim likes that, but that could be to her detriment at some point. Who knows? Gabby certainly has a tough side that we haven't quite seen yet." She also confirmed that the storyline would run for several months.

Bentham explained that some of Gabby's motives for the battle are impressing Kim and being jealous of Dawn's relationship with Jamie. Gabby is attracted to Jamie's power, his money and his house since she wants what he has. While she is somewhat attracted to him, it is "mainly about what she can gain for herself". Bentham enthused at the thought of Gabby taking over Home Farm, since it would "launch her into something completely new and exciting". While Gabby is primarily trying to show that she can be like Kim, she is also trying to get Dawn "out of Jamie's line of women". However, when Jamie hires Dawn to work at the local vets and leaves to work there himself, Gabby is annoyed that her plan did not work, with Bentham stating that Gabby is "fuming", as well as Kim. Gabby then wants to join Kim's empire and loves the power that Kim has. She likened the storyline to Gabby's fixation with Leyla, noting that Gabby would become loyal to Kim: "if anyone sees potential in Gabby, she will hook onto it". When Gabby reveals to the Tates that she is pregnant, Bentham stated that Kim responds well, due to being happy about building her Tate empire, while Jamie is "not thrilled" about being linked to someone through a child. Bentham added that due to Kim buying the baby gifts early into the pregnancy, Gabby gets a taste of the Home Farm life, and it leads her to want more.

== Storylines ==
Gabby is born on Christmas Day to Bernice Blackstock (Samantha Giles), and a DNA test later reveals Ashley Thomas (John Middleton) to be her father. Bernice does not take to motherhood easily and leaves the village as she divorces her father in 2002. Gabby occasionally visits her mother, who later marries a man named Charlie Willis in 2004 and has a second daughter, Dee Dee (Mia Gibson-Reed). Gabby and her half-brother Arthur (Alfie Clarke) both learn that Ashley has dementia. In Bernice's salon, Gabby discovers a sex tape of Kerry Wyatt (Laura Norton) and Dan Spencer (Liam Fox) and she shares it online. Bernice discovers Gabby is responsible for leaking the video and Gabby is forced to clean at the salon. When Bernice refuses to let Gabby get her eyebrows done, Gabby draws them on with permanent maker and Bernice does not allow her to go on a skiing trip. When alcohol is found, Ashley suspects it belongs to Laurel, but it is discovered that it belongs to Gabby. Gabby confesses to Ashley, who reacts angrily to her underage drinking.

Gabby develops feeling for friend Jacob Gallagher (Joe-Warren Plant) and goes on a date with him. Jacob later tells his father, David Metcalfe (Matthew Wolfenden), that Gabby and Lachlan White (Thomas Atkinson) broke into Eric Pollard's (Chris Chittell) house and took his ring. When Ashley discovers what she has done, he tells Bernice that he wants Gabby to live with him full-time. Gabby overhears Ashley and his wife, Laurel Thomas (Charlotte Bellamy), discussing discipline methods, with Laurel suggesting boundaries. Gabby and Liv Flaherty (Isobel Steele) break into Victoria Barton's (Isabel Hodgins) house and take her clothes. Ashley and Laurel find out that Gabby is responsible for the robbery, as well as discovering that she has stolen Sandy Thomas' (Freddie Jones) pension. Gabby fails to apologise and Ashley reports her to the police. Gabby admits to Ashley that she is scared that he will die and they make up and Gabby apologises to her family. Laurel later gives birth to Gabby's half-sister, Dotty Thomas (Tilly-Rue Foster/Ellerie Carroll). Laurel decides to move Ashley into full time care, upsetting Gabby and Arthur. Gabby accompanies Laurel to take Ashley to his care home and Laurel reassures Gabby she can still live with her as she still sees her as her daughter. When Laurel is told that Ashley is not responding to treatment and that the family should start saying goodbye, Gabby stays with Bernice, struggling to come to terms with Ashley being set to die. She wants to say goodbye to Ashley, but he dies before she can.

After Bernice receives a call about her ex-husband being ill, she makes the decision to leave the village to be with him in Australia. She takes Dee Dee with her, but insists that Gabby should stay behind so that she can complete her education. Gabby begins to feel lonely, and feeling that Bernice's boyfriend, Liam Cavanagh (Jonny McPherson), and his new girlfriend, Leyla Harding (Roxy Shahidi) are responsible for Bernice leaving, she vandalises Leyla's wedding planning business, Take a Vow. Gabby begins attending university, but comes to the conclusion that she does not enjoy it, and would rather be working to earn money. Leyla later discovers that Gabby is behind the vandalism, and rather than reporting her to the police, she feels sympathy for her situation, and gives her a job at Take a Vow. Gabby grows a strong affection for Leyla and ensures that she is in her company as much as possible. Gabby sees Liam chatting with his colleague Meena Jutla (Paige Sandhu) and decides to set the pair up. She orders a bouquet of flowers to Meena's house, with a note signed from Liam, in order to trick Leyla into believing that they are having an affair. Leyla initially believes that Liam has cheated on her with Gabby's encouragement, but the pair later reconcile. Liam suspects that Gabby is behind the prank, and contacts a flower shop, who confirm his suspicions. He then begins to blackmail Gabby into spending less time with Leyla, threatening to tell Leyla the truth. Leyla then sees the pair in a heated discussion, and assumes that he is grooming her, which Gabby does not respond to. Liam pleads with Leyla to see the truth, and when she realises that Gabby has become obsessed with her, she fires her from Take a Vow.

Liam's daughter Leanna (Mimi Slinger) vows to make Gabby's life a "living hell" due to her nearly ruining Liam's life, and attempts to get her fired from her new job at the Hide restaurant. Gabby's boss Jamie Tate (Alexander Lincoln) defends Gabby, and Gabby develops a crush on Jamie. The pair later have sex, but after Jamie insists that it meant nothing and that he likes Dawn Taylor (Olivia Bromley), she decides to take revenge. She hides Bear Wolf's (Joshua Richards) wallet in Dawn's bag, which gets her fired from the Hide. Other Hop boss Kim Tate (Claire King) sees what Gabby has done on CCTV, but decides to mentor Gabby, since she dislikes Dawn and sees a spark in Gabby. Gabby later discovers that she is pregnant, with Jamie as the father. She reveals the news to Jamie, who is disgusted, while Kim is supportive and allows her to move into her Home Farm estate. She later gives birth to her son, Thomas Tate.

== Reception ==
In episodes broadcast in February 2016, Gabby was seen drawing on a Scouse brow with permanent marker as part of her under-age drinking storyline. Many viewers took to social media to ridicule Gabby's look, despite the serious nature of plot. A columnist for Inside Soap commented: "Gabby Thomas isn't a bad girl, but she really ought to think twice before listening to sneaky Lachlan." Duncan Lindsay of Metro praised Bentham and her on-screen family for the portrayal of Ashley's dementia, saying their performances "continue to be outstanding". For her portrayal as Gabby, Bentham was nominated at the 2016 TV Choice Awards for Best Soap Newcomer. In 2016, Sarah Ellis from Inside Soap criticised Gabby's behaviour, saying that it is the "last thing poor Ashley needs".
