= The One Note Man =

2023 British short film

- Film poster
- Directed by: George Siougas
- Written by: George Siougas
- Produced by: George Siougas; Luke Carroll; Michael Stevenson
- Starring: Jason Watkins; Louisa Clein; Crystal Yu; Paul Barber
- Narrated by: Ian McKellen
- Cinematography: Matt North
- Edited by: Russell Beeden
- Music by: Stephen Warbeck
- Production company: Cusp Films
- Release date: 8 August 2023 (RIIFF)
- Running time: 21 minutes
- Country: United Kingdom
- Language: English

The One Note Man is a 2023 British short comedy-drama film written, produced, and directed by George Siougas. It stars Jason Watkins, Louisa Clein, Crystal Yu, and Paul Barber, and is narrated by Ian McKellen. Sam Claflin is one of the executive producers. Watkins plays a bassoonist, who has a strict routine that involves bicycling to an opera house to play one note on his bassoon in an orchestra everyday. Aside from the narration, which is brief, the film has no dialogue.

== Cast ==
- Jason Watkins as One Note Man
- Louisa Clein as Violinist
- Crystal Yu as Conductor
- Paul Barber as Florist
- Daman Bamrah as Nodding Man
- Alexandra Laurence as Woman on Bench
- Lewis Murphy-Parry as Man on Bench
- Ian McKellen as Storyteller

== Background ==
The film is an adaptation of H. M. Bateman's "The One-Note Man", which first appeared in Punch on December 14, 1921. In the cartoon, the One-Note Man is a clarinetist. Alfred Hitchcock used it as an inspiration for the cymbal player in The Man Who Knew Too Much.

== Reception ==
Benjamin Franz of Film Threat gave it a score of 9 out of 10 and wrote, "This is a glorious short film. It’s quite possibly the most enchanting Christmas time fable I have witnessed in years." Chris Olson of UK Film Review gave it five stars and wrote, "Irresistibly charming and poignant, short film The One Note Man delivers a rousing tale of one man's stagnant existence being galvanized by a disruption to his own clockwork routine by a loose thread on his jacket."

=== Accolades ===
The One Note Man won the Grand Prize for Best Live Action Short Film at the 2023 Rhode Island International Film Festival. It won the Audience Award for Best Live-Action Short at the 2024 Palm Springs International ShortFest. It was also shortlisted for Best Live Action Short Film at the 96th Academy Awards, but was not nominated.
