= List of Emmerdale Farm characters introduced in 1974–1975 =

The following is a list of characters that first appeared in the British soap opera Emmerdale Farm in 1974, by order of first appearance. Jim Gimbel (John Atkinson) makes his debut appearance in November.

== Jim Gimbel ==
Jim Gimbel
- Emmerdale character
- Portrayed by: John Atkinson
- Duration: 1974–1975
- First appearance: 25 November 1974
- Last appearance: 10 November 1975
In-universe information
- Occupation: Farmer
- Wife: Freda Gimbel
- Sons: Martin Gimbel; Davy Gimbel
- Daughters: Kathy Gimbel

Jim Gimbel, played by John Atkinson, first appears on 25 November 1974. Prior to his onscreen debut, he is mentioned by Amos Brearly (Ronald Magill) and Sam Pearson (Toke Townley). In October 1974, after Joe Sugden (Frazer Hines) and his wife Christine (Angela Cheyne) separate after six weeks of marriage, Joe begins dating Jim's daughter, Kathy (Polly Hemingway), which Jim disapproves of. Jim throws his son Martin (George Fenton) out after an argument with him, but later allows back home. Jim feels he was being patronised by his son about how to do farming. Jim and his wife Freda (Mary Henry) go to visit Jim's sister. Offscreen, Jim becomes increasingly violent. He starts physically abusing his children, and when he raises his hand to Freda, Freda leaves Jim. A depressed Jim then shoots himself.

== Rosemary Kendall ==
Rosemary Kendall
- Emmerdale character
- Portrayed by: Lesley Manville
- Duration: 1975–1976
- First appearance: 18 February 1975
- Last appearance: 13 April 1976
In-universe information
- Occupation: Farmhand
- Father: Arthur Kendall
- Mother: Jean Kendall
- Other relatives: Sam Pearson; Annie Sugden; Joe Sugden

Rosemary Kendall, portrayed by Lesley Manville, is a distant relative of the Sugden family. Her grandmother Rosemary, whom she was named after, was the sister of Sam Pearson (Toke Townley). Rosemary arrived at Emmerdale Farm in February 1975 after her mother, Jean was depressed and admitted to a mental hospital. Whilst at the farm, she nearly entered a relationship with Joe Sugden (Frazer Hines) despite being distant cousins. After many dramatic events, Rosemary returned home to Middlesbrough in April 1976.

In December 2025, fifty years after appearing, Manville talked about her role on Emmerdale Farm. She told Digital Spy that she drove her co-stars "mad" whilst on set. She explained: "Well, apparently, I was quite bossy. Even with the established, seasoned actors I was working with." She also explained that she would "thinking I was being helpful". She continued: "'Oh, you know, when you did that bit, you are not meant to stand there, you are meant to stand over there,'" she would say, adding that it "drove them mad."
