= Rosie Bentham =

English actress

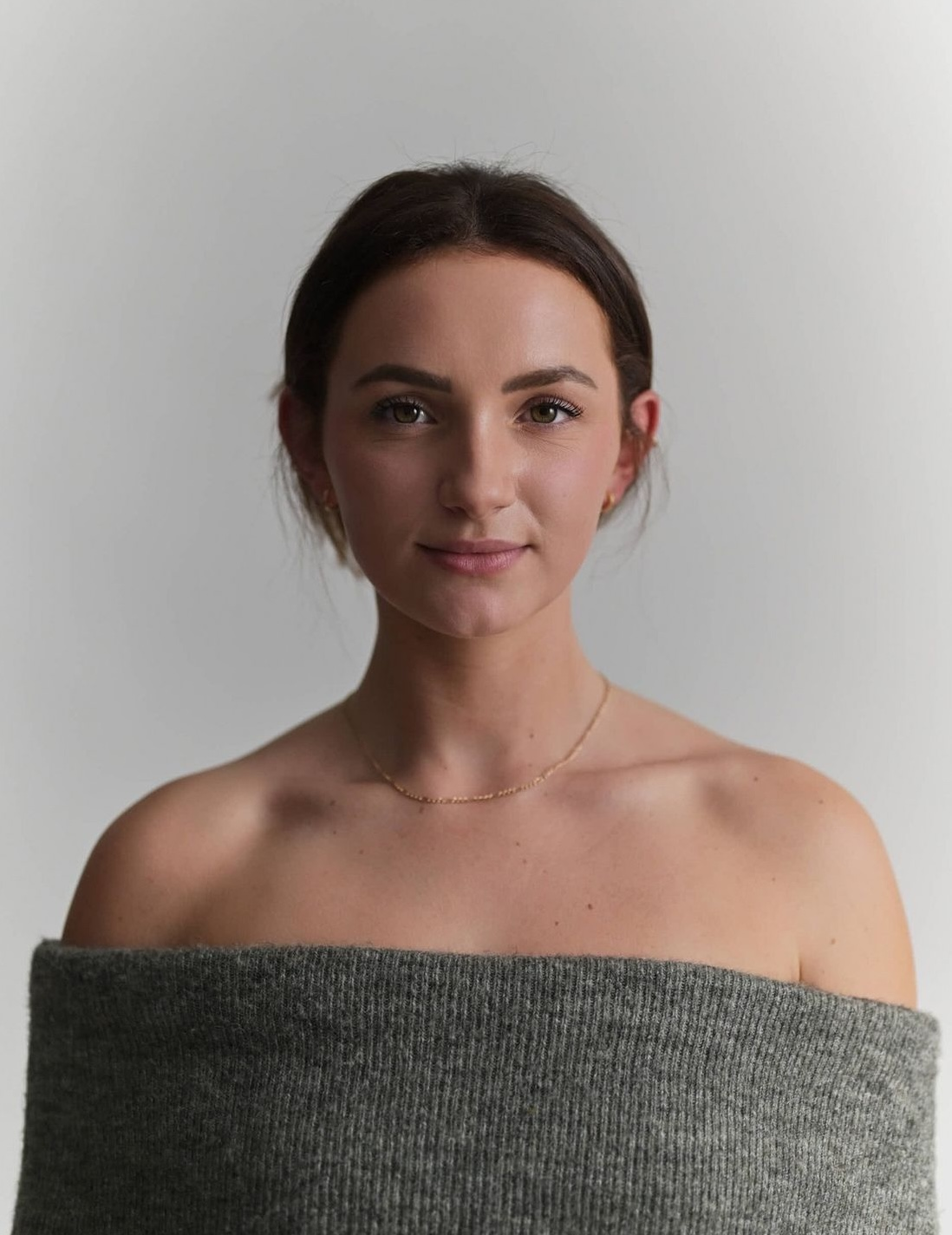
- Rosie Bentham
- Born: Rosie Elizabeth Bentham; 29 July 2001 (age 25); West Bridgford, Nottingham, England
- Education: The Nottingham Emmanuel School
- Occupation: Actress
- Years active: 2013–present

Rosie Elizabeth Bentham (born 29 July 2001) is an English actress who has appeared as Gabby Thomas in Emmerdale since January 2016.

== Early life and personal life ==
Bentham was born in 2001 to John and Marianne Bentham. Her father was chaplain to the University of Nottingham and canon of Southwell Minster; he died on 6 August 2019 from a pulmonary embolism. Bentham attended The Nottingham Emmanuel School. Bentham supports West Ham United and also her hometown club Nottingham Forest.

== Career ==
Bentham joined The Television Workshop in 2013, and worked on plays, such as Oklahoma!, Fiddler on the Roof, The Sound of Music and Annie. Bentham auditioned for Emmerdale when producers contacted The Television Workshop, and had four callbacks before being offered the part of Gabby Thomas. She made her debut appearance in January 2016. Bentham has also made guest appearances on kids' TV shows Saturday Mash-Up! and Crackerjack!, getting gunged on both shows, as well as being interviewed on ITV's Lorraine.

== Filmography ==
=== Television ===
| Year | Title | Role | Apps |
|---|---|---|---|
| 2016 – present | Emmerdale | Gabby Thomas | Regular Role |
| 2020 | Crackerjack! | Herself – Guest | 1 episode |
| 2021, 2022 and 2023 | Saturday Mash-Up! | Herself – Guest | 3 episodes |
| 2023 | Lorraine | Herself – Guest | 1 episode |

== Awards and nominations ==
| Year | Award | Category | Work | Result | Ref. |
|---|---|---|---|---|---|
| 2016 | TV Choice Awards | Best Soap Newcomer | Emmerdale | Longlisted | |
