= Mark Flanagan =

Mark Flanagan may refer to:

- Mark Flanagan (actor), Welsh television actor
- Mark Flanagan (boxer) (born 1990), Australian boxer
- Mark Flanagan (chef), head chef to the royal household of the UK
- Mark Flanagan (communications), former head of strategic communications at 10 Downing Street, now a partner at Portland Communications
- Mark Flanagan (musician), British blues guitarist
- Mark Flanagan (rugby league) (born 1987), English rugby league player
- Mark Flanagan (rugby union) (born 1989), Irish rugby union player
- Mark Flanagan, owner of the Largo nightclub in Los Angeles
- Mark Flanagan (politician) (born 1963), American politician

== See also ==
- Marc Flanagan (born 1948), American television producer and writer
