= Mimi Slinger =

British actress (born 2003)

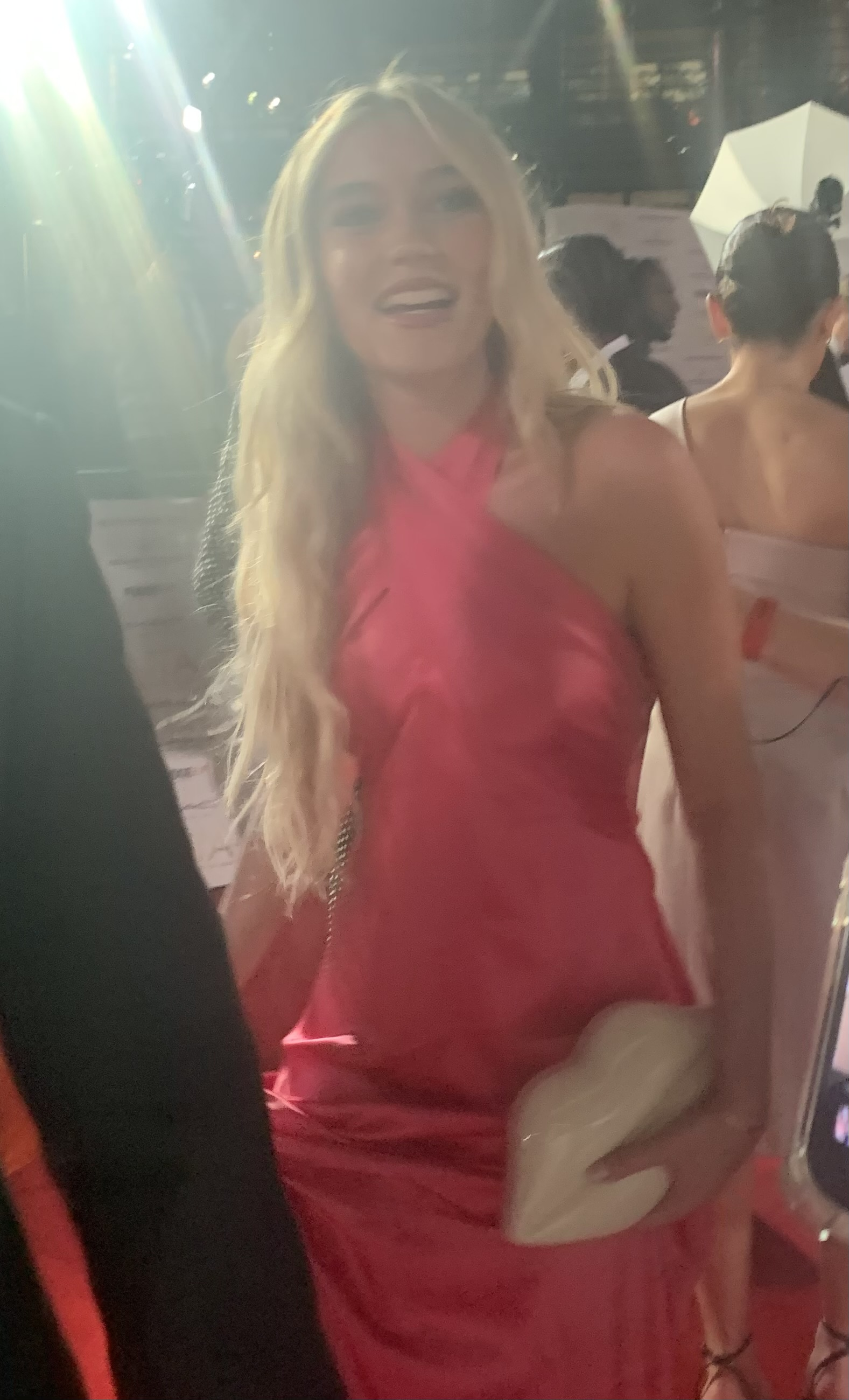
- Slinger in 2022
- Born: 6 February 2003 (age 23); England
- Occupations: Actress; model
- Years active: 2014–present
- Height: 5 ft 5 in (1.65 m)
- Modeling information
- Hair color: Blonde
- Eye color: Green
- Agency: Storm Management

Mimi Slinger (born 6 February 2003) is an English actress and model, known for playing Leanna Cavanagh on the ITV soap opera Emmerdale (2018–2021). In 2021, she was signed to Storm Management for model representation.

== Early and personal life ==
Slinger was born on 6 February 2003 in England. At a few months old, her family moved to Singapore where she grew up. She attended the Tanglin Trust School, where she began performing. Then at the age of eleven, Slinger and her family moved back to England. Slinger then began attending the Sylvia Young Theatre School in London, as well as attending weekend classes at ArtsEd.

From 2021 to 2025, Slinger dated singer and television presenter, HRVY. HRVY announced their split in November 2025, citing Vogue's article about having a boyfriend being embarrassing as the reason for their split.

== Career ==
Slinger began singing at the age of six and later discovered musical theatre. She made her stage debut in 2014, where she appeared in a production of The Sound of Music, where she played Brigitta von Trapp. In 2017, Slinger made her onscreen debut in Heidi: Queen of the Mountain, in which she played Clara. That same year, she appeared in The Braille Legacy at the Charing Cross Theatre.

In 2018, Slinger began appearing in the ITV soap opera Emmerdale, playing Leanna Cavanagh. In an interview with Digital Spy, Slinger stated that her character is "a troublemaker and loves the attention that comes with it." In 2021, it was announced that Slinger had been signed by modelling agency Storm Management. She left Emmerdale later that year, but expressed a desire to continue acting on television alongside her modelling ventures. In 2023, she starred in the short film Path to Ecstasy, and later made an appearance in an episode of the Apple war series Masters of the Air. 2025 saw Slinger have a supporting role in The Wayfinders, as well as making an appearance in the romantic comedy film Maintenance Required.

== Filmography ==
Year	Title	Role	Notes
2017	Heidi: Queen of the Mountain	Clara	Film
2018–2021	Emmerdale	Leanna Cavanagh	Regular role
2023	Path to Ecstasy	Emma	Short film
2023	Masters of the Air	Sally	1 episode
2025	The Wayfinders	Keesha	1 episode
2025	Maintenance Required	Jasmine	Film
