= Emmerdale =

British television soap opera (since 1972)

- Also known as: Emmerdale Farm (1972–1989)
- Genre: Soap opera
- Created by: Kevin Laffan
- Starring: Present cast; Former cast
- Theme music composer: Tony Hatch
- Country of origin: United Kingdom
- Original language: English
- No. of episodes: 10,602

Production
- Executive producers: Various; (currently Iain MacLeod)
- Producers: Various; (currently Laura Shaw and Sophie Roper)
- Production locations: Leeds Studios (1972–present); Arncliffe, North Yorkshire (1972–1976); Esholt, West Yorkshire (1976–1997); Harewood House, West Yorkshire (1997–present)
- Camera setup: Videotape; multiple-camera
- Running time: 30–60 minutes (including advertisements)
- Production companies: Yorkshire Television (1972–2006); ITV Productions (2006–2009); ITV Studios Continuing Drama (2009–present)

Original release
- Network: ITV
- Release: 16 October 1972 – present

Emmerdale (known as Emmerdale Farm until 1989) is a British television soap opera that is broadcast on ITV. The show is set in Emmerdale (known as Beckindale until 1994), a fictional village in the Yorkshire Dales. Created by Kevin Laffan, Emmerdale Farm was first broadcast on 16 October 1972. Interior scenes have been filmed at the Leeds Studios since its inception. Exterior scenes were first filmed in Arncliffe in Littondale, and the series may have taken its name from Amerdale, an ancient name of Littondale. Exterior scenes were later shot at Esholt, but are now shot at a purpose-built set on the Harewood estate.

The series originally aired during the afternoon and was intended to be a three-month television series. However, more episodes were ordered and transmitted during the daytime until 1978, when it was moved to an early-evening prime time slot in most regions. In the late 1980s, a new production team oversaw the name change and introduced more dramatic storylines, as well as increasing the frequency of episodes. As a result of the changes, viewers and popularity surrounding the soap increased and Emmerdale began to be considered as a major British soap opera. The programme began broadcasting in high definition on 10 October 2011, and in 2016, Emmerdale won the award for Best British Soap at the British Soap Awards for the first time. Since January 2019, "classic episodes" of Emmerdale have been broadcast twice daily on ITV3.

== History ==
=== 1972–1985: Emmerdale Farm ===
Emmerdale Farm was created when Kevin Laffan was asked to write a lunchtime farming serial for ITV, as the network was looking to expand its daytime programming after government restrictions on broadcasting hours were relaxed. He initially said no as his agent advised him that writing a soap would tarnish his reputation as a playwright, which he found to be part of a snobbish attitude shown towards soap operas. Laffan eventually said yes and formed a 26-episode play that would act as a 13-week serial. Laffan had worked on a farm for six months in his youth, and said on writing about farm life: "I was intrigued by the idea that farming was a way of life, as opposed to simply a way of earning a living." The premise of Emmerdale Farm was similar to the BBC Radio 4 soap opera The Archers, focusing on a family, a farm and characters in a nearby village. The programme's farmyard filming was originally modelled on RTÉ's The Riordans, an Irish soap opera which was broadcast from the mid-1960s to the end of the 1970s. The Riordans broke new ground for soap operas by being filmed largely outdoors (on a farm, owned on the programme by Tom and Mary Riordan) rather than in a studio—the usual practice of British and American soap operas. The Riordans' success demonstrated that a soap opera could be filmed largely outdoors, and Yorkshire Television sent people to its set in County Meath to see the programme's production first-hand.

The first episode aired on 16 October 1972 at 1:30 pm, and began with the Sugden family convening in the fictional village of Beckindale for the funeral of a relative. Peter Willes, the then-head of serial dramas at Yorkshire Television, did not like that the soap began with a funeral as he found it to be a "very downbeat way to start" and "a big switch-off". However, Laffan pushed the concept as he felt that a funeral would be the best option from a dramatic viewpoint. The show's early years as Emmerdale Farm centred on the Sugden family and rural farm life. The show was originally broadcast twice a week in the afternoon and was regarded by critics as a "sleepy soap" where not much happened. After its initial 13-week run, the positive viewer response led to an increase to 26 weeks and then a 6-month run, which led to the eventual year-long screening of the soap. The increase in episode output was accompanied by a move to a late-afternoon time slot. By 1977, it was moved to a prime time evening slot in most ITV regions.

=== 1986–1999: Revamp and becoming a major British soap ===
In the late 1980s, a new production team headed by executive producer Keith Richardson was brought in, and the show's focus moved to the nearby village of Beckindale, with more dramatic storylines such as Pat Sugden's 1986 car crash and the 1988 Crossgill fire. By 1988, the show had been moved to an evening time slot in all ITV regions. Emmerdale Farm also began broadcasting episodes year-round that year. Reflecting its change in focus, the title was changed to Emmerdale on 14 November 1989. Coinciding with the title change was the introduction of the wealthy Tate family, bringing with them racier storylines. Under Richardson, the soap's popularity gradually began to improve. Richardson produced the programme for 24 years, overseeing its transformation from a minor, daytime, rural drama into a major prime time UK soap opera.

By 1993, Emmerdale was into its third decade on the air and December 1993 saw a major turning point in the show's history, when an episode featured a plane crashing into the village of Beckindale, killing four main characters, giving Emmerdale its highest-ever audience of 18 million and marking its transformation into a major prime time soap opera. The plane crash "allowed the writers to get rid of much dead wood, and reinvent the soap virtually from scratch," which included survivors changing the village name from "Beckindale" to "Emmerdale". The production team had continually had issues with the fictional village's geography, but they found that the plane crash allowed them to introduce a village that had continuity. Since the plane crash, Emmerdale has had increasingly dramatic storylines and glamorous characters. In 1994, former Coronation Street producer Mervyn Watson was hired to inject more humour into the show. New long-term characters, such as the Windsor and Dingle families, were also introduced in the 1990s. The Tates became the soap's leading family during the decade.

=== 2000–2011: Continued success and more episodes ===
By 2000, Emmerdale episodes were regularly getting 12 million viewers, and the number of episodes per week was increased from three to five. An ITV talent show, Soapstars, was held in 2001 to cast the new five-member Calder family; the Calders made their debut on the show in November that year, and all members had left by August 2002. In 2004, Emmerdale became the first British soap opera to broadcast six episodes a week. By 2006, Emmerdale was contending with, and at times beating, EastEnders in viewership. In 2007, an hour-long special episode revealing the murderer of Tom King (Kenneth Farrington) aired; the episode gained an average of 8.6 million viewers, peaking at 9.1 million viewers when Tom's son Carl (Tom Lister) confesses to the murder. The episode received more than double the amount of viewership EastEnders did.

The early and mid-2000s saw the introduction of major long-term characters, including the King family and Cain (Jeff Hordley) and Charity Dingle (Emma Atkins). This era also saw high-profile castings such as Patsy Kensit as Sadie King in 2004, and Amanda Donohoe and Maxwell Caulfield as Natasha and Mark Wylde in 2008. Major storylines during this period included a bus crash, Sarah Sugden's death in a barn fire, a New Year's Eve storm, the Kings River explosion, and the Sugden house fire. In 2009, the longest-tenured character, Jack Sugden (Clive Hornby), was killed off. Jack's funeral featured the first on-screen appearance in 13 years of Annie Sugden (Sheila Mercier). The same year, long-serving executive producer Keith Richardson was replaced by former series producer Steve November (later replaced by John Whiston). Gavin Blyth became the series producer, followed by Stuart Blackburn after Blyth's death. In January 2011, two of the soaps longest-serving characters Viv Hope portrayed by Deena Payne since 1993 and Terry Woods portrayed by Billy Hartman since 1995 respectively, were both killed off as part of a major fire storyline.

=== 2012–2021: Anniversary celebrations and events ===
Emmerdale celebrated its 40th anniversary with its first-ever live episode on 17 October 2012. "Emmerdale Live" featured the death of Carl King (Tom Lister) and a live music festival with performances by Scouting for Girls and the Proclaimers as part of the anniversary celebrations. The story of Carl's death took the show into 2013, when Kate Oates replaced Blackburn as the new series producer. One of Oates' aims was to feature more of the village and rural countryside locations and to bring more "balance" to the show instead of focusing on "a few very high-profile stories". Major storylines during this period included a helicopter crash that killed Ruby Haswell (Alicya Eyo) and Val Pollard (Charlie Hardwick), and a multi-car pile-up. In 2016, Emmerdale was named Best British Soap for the first time at the British Soap Awards.

In January 2019, ITV3 began airing episodes of Emmerdale from the beginning of the soap's inception. Billed Classic Emmerdale, ten sequential episodes have been broadcast weekly since. In 2018 Claire King reprised her iconic role as Kim Tate after almost twenty years away, for a "special week" of episodes. With King resuming the role permanently in 2019. In March 2019, an episode featuring an exclusively female cast and crew was aired in support of International Women's Day. Executive producer Jane Hudson said that the episode was "a great opportunity for Emmerdale to show the female talent we have both in front and behind the camera." In 2020, the production and filming of Emmerdale was suspended due to the COVID-19 pandemic. In order to prevent the programme from coming off air, the episodes shown per week were halved from six to three. They were later reduced to two episodes a week, but have since returned to the normal schedule. In September 2020, it was announced that there would be a "big autumn shake-up"; one of the changes included the casting of Paige Sandhu as Meena Jutla. She was later confirmed to be a serial killer and has been responsible for the murders of Leanna Cavanagh (Mimi Slinger), Andrea Tate (Anna Nightingale) and Ben Tucker (Simon Lennon). All of the actors involved expressed a decision to leave the soap and their exits were incorporated into Meena's serial killer arc, a storyline which has seen Sandhu awarded Best Villain at the 2021 Inside Soap Awards.

On 12 October 2021, it was announced that Emmerdale would partake in a special crossover event involving multiple British soaps to promote the topic of climate change ahead of the 2021 United Nations Climate Change Conference. The event was first suggested by Emmerdale's executive producer Jane Hudson. It was confirmed that a social media clip featuring two characters from Emmerdale would be discussed in Coronation Street, while Emmerdale itself would refer to events in Casualty.

=== 2022–present: Producer and cast changes ===
In January 2022, it was confirmed that the production team were in the early stages of creating the 50th anniversary storylines set to air in October 2022. They hinted that the anniversary would see a "huge shake-up". The anniversary episode received a mixed reaction. Radio Times appreciated the writing and acting, as well as how the series has "reinvented itself to turn away from the mundanity of the farm, and into a relevant, powerful and completely gripping soap". However, it was noted by newspapers how viewers were unimpressed and had expected more drama. In 2023, Hudson, who had been the executive producer of Emmerdale since 2018, left her role.

Hudson was replaced internally by Iain Macleod, who was promoted from Coronation Street's executive producer to overseeing both soaps. At the same time, former producer Sophie Roper was reappointed. She confirmed a new era for Emmerdale from 2024, with various cast changes and "bold and ground-breaking drama". The initial cast changes saw short-term characters including Ethan Anderson (Emile John), Nicky Miligan (Lewis Cope) and Suni Sharma (Brahmdeo Shannon Ramana) written out of the soap. However, they later also removed characters with lengthy tenures, including Amelia Spencer (Daisy Campbell), Wendy Posner (Susan Cookson), Will Taylor (Dean Andrews), Brenda Walker (Lesley Dunlop) and Leyla Harding (Roxy Shahidi). Uploading episodes early onto ITVX was introduced in 2024, to give viewers more flexibility in when they want to watch the series. This was inspired by a 30% rise of viewing figures for Emmerdale on ITVX. In 2026 after an absence of two decades it was announced that Patsy Kensit will reprise her role as Sadie King.

== Setting and characters ==
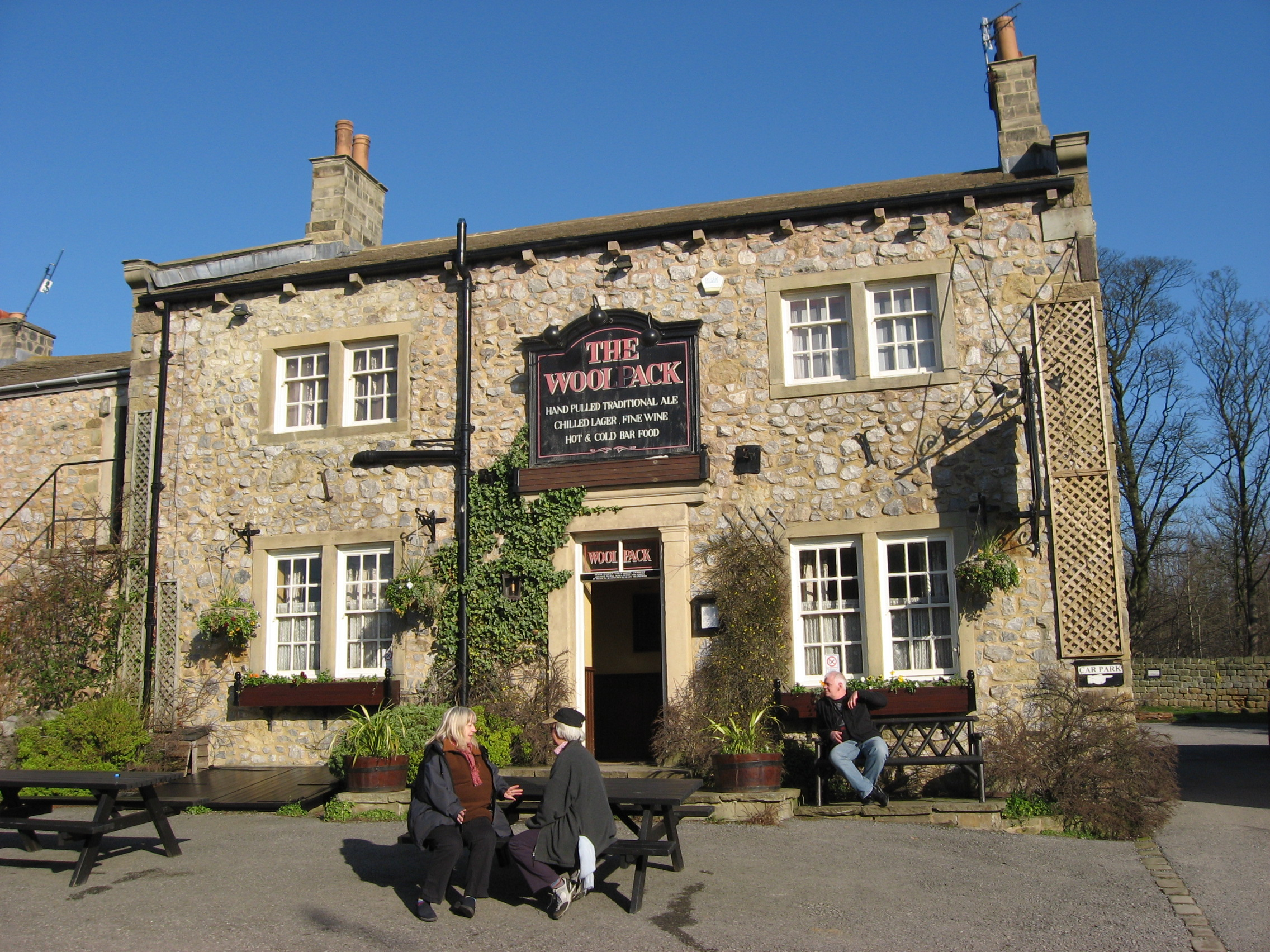
Emmerdale's fictional public house, the Woolpack.

Emmerdale has had a large number of characters since it began, with its cast gradually expanding in size. The series has also had changing residences and businesses for its characters. The series is set in Emmerdale (known as Beckindale until 1994), a fictional village in the Yorkshire Dales. It has been noted that the fictional village spans 3,217 acres and is located 39 miles from Bradford and 52 miles from Leeds. A farmhouse, Emmerdale Farm, was the original focal point of the show when it was first broadcast in 1972. The farmhouse was eventually written out of the series in the early 1990s. Local public house The Woolpack is "the heart of the community". Owners of the Woolpack have included Amos Brearly (Ronald Magill), Henry Wilks (Arthur Pentelow), Alan Turner (Richard Thorp), Diane Sugden (Elizabeth Estensen), Chas Dingle (Lucy Pargeter), and Charity Dingle (Emma Atkins). Home Farm is a mansion in Emmerdale; it was first introduced on-screen as Miffield Hall in 1973 and was renamed in 1978. Other locales include a factory, a bed-and-breakfast, a corner shop, an outdoor-pursuits centre, and various cafés.

=== Families ===
Emmerdale has featured a number of families:

- The Sugden family (1972–present)
- The Bates family (1984–2001)
- The Whiteley family (1989–1994)
- The Tate family (1989–2005, 2009–present)
- The McAllister family (1993–1995)
- The Windsor/Hope families (1993–present)
- The Dingle family (1994–present)
- The Glover family (1994–2000)
- The Thomas family (1996–present)
- The Cairns family (1997–1999)
- The Blackstock/Lambert family (1998–present)
- The Reynolds family (1999–2007)
- The Daggert family (2001–2007)
- The Calder/Weston family (2001–2002)
- The King family (2004–present)
- The Sinclair/Oakwell family (2006–2008)
- The Wylde/Lamb family (2009–2011)
- The Barton family (2009–present)
- The Sharma family (2009–present)
- The Macey family (2010–2019)
- The Spencer/Breckle family (2011–2024)
- The White family (2014–2019)
- The Anderson family (2020–present)
- The Fox/Miligan family (2022–present)

The Sugdens and their relatives, the Merricks and the Skilbecks, were at the centre of the show during the series' first two decades in the 1970s and 1980s (the Emmerdale Farm era). The Sugdens, owners of Emmerdale Farm, were its first family. Many of its members, and those of the Merrick and Skilbeck families, have left or been killed off since the mid-1990s. Sugdens remaining in the village are Jack's daughter, Victoria Sugden (Isabel Hodgins), her son Harry, and Andy Sugden's (Kelvin Fletcher) daughter Sarah (Katie Hill).

December 1984 saw the arrival of Caroline Bates; her teenage children, Kathy and Nick, followed in late 1985. Caroline left the show in 1989, returning for guest appearances in 1991, 1993–1994 and 1996. Nick was written out of the show when he was sentenced to ten years in prison in 1997. Kathy and her niece, Alice, remained in the village until late 2001; by then, Kathy had outlived two husbands. The wealthy Tates were introduced as the new owners of Home Farm in 1989, with the family consisting of Frank Tate (Norman Bowler), wife Kim (Claire King) and children Chris (Peter Amory) and Zoe (Leah Bracknell).

Other families followed: the middle-class Windsors in 1993, known as the Hope family after Viv's (Deena Payne) 2001 marriage to Bob Hope (Tony Audenshaw), and the ne'er-do-well Dingle family in 1994. The Tate, Windsor-Hope and Dingle families predominated during the 1990s and 2000s. The era's storylines included the 1993 plane crash, the 1994 Home Farm siege, the 1998 post-office robbery, the 2000 bus crash, the 2003–04 storm and the 2006 King show-home collapse. By the mid- to late-2000s, the last of the Tates (Zoe, daughter Jean and nephew Joseph) had emigrated to New Zealand. In 2009, Chris Tate's ex-wife Charity and their son Noah returned to the village. In 2017, Joe Tate returned to the village. In 2018, Kim Tate returned to the village after nearly 20-year absence, and in the following year her son James returned as well. Members of the Windsor-Hope family left the village in early 2006, and Viv Hope was killed off in a village fire in February 2011 after nearly 18 years on the show. As of 2024, only Donna Windsor's daughter, April, and the Hope branch of the family (Bob and his daughter Cathy) remain.

The King family arrived in 2004, as the Tates departed. All but Jimmy King, his half-sister, Scarlett Nicholls, and his three children, Elliott, Angelica and Carl, were killed off. By 2018, most of the Dingles still remained, having actually increased their numbers in Emmerdale over the years. Their circumstances had changed in their two decades in the village; Chas Dingle owned half of The Woolpack, with Charity Dingle owning the other half, and Marlon was a chef there. In 2014, the Dingles, Bartons and Whites were the central families; the Bartons are a farming family, and the Whites owned Home Farm. In 2022, Daniel Kilkelly of Digital Spy stated that the Dingles were "arguably the best-known family from the current cast."

== Storylines ==
Over the years, along with its stories of romance and family life, Emmerdale has highlighted a range of different social issues. In 2022, Leeds Live conducted a poll to ask viewers what, in their opinion, have been the greatest storylines in the soap's history. Meena Jutla's (Paige Sandhu) killing spree was voted the winner. The other fourteen nominees, in vote order, were: Ashley Thomas' (John Middleton) dementia, the Hotten bypass crash, the plane crash, the helicopter crash, the storm and Tricia Dingle's (Sheree Murphy) death, Kim Tate's (Claire King) 2018 return, the Woolpack siege, Carl King's (Tom Lister) death, Kim Tate murdering Frank Tate (Norman Bowler), Chris Tate's (Peter Amory) suicide framing Charity Dingle (Emma Atkins), "Who killed Emma Barton?", the Mill cottage explosion, the post office robbery and the Crossgill fire.

== Broadcast ==
=== United Kingdom ===
Emmerdale was initially broadcast two afternoons a week in 1972, typically on Mondays and Tuesdays. From 1977, the series moved out of the daytime programming slot, with eight out of the fourteen ITV regions choosing to accommodate the programme in the 7:00 pm Tuesday and Thursday slots. The other six regions, including all of Scotland and London, preferred the 5:15 pm slots on Mondays and Tuesdays. From 6 January 1988, all ITV regions networked the show in the 6:30 pm slot, but two years later, the transmission time reverted to 7:00 pm, still twice weekly. By January 1997, ITV had opted to increase output to three episodes a week, and from October 2000, a further two episodes were added, meaning Emmerdale was broadcasting every weekday. A sixth episode begin to air on Sundays in 2004, making Emmerdale the first British soap to broadcast six episodes a week. In January 2008, as with Coronation Street, ITV announced they would cease airing Emmerdale on a Sunday night; this meant that Emmerdale would still air at 7:00 pm each weekday, but to compensate, the Tuesday episode would run until 8:00 pm. Producers of the soap explained that "each hour-long episode on Tuesday will be specially written and won't be two half-hour ones put together." The move meant that the second half of Emmerdale's Tuesday episode would clash with rival BBC soap EastEnders.

On 8 July 2009, ITV announced that they were to revamp their schedule yet again. This time, Emmerdale's Tuesday hour-long episode was reduced back down to 30 minutes, and replaced with a second Thursday episode. Emmerdale and EastEnders ratings improved due to this, with Emmerdale getting 7.7 million, its highest in over 6 months, on 1 October 2009. Between April and August 2019, ITV began airing an additional episode on Tuesdays at 8pm, bringing the total number of episodes a week to seven, but it was reduced back to six due to the heavy amount of filming for cast and crew involved. In March 2020, due to the effects of the COVID-19 pandemic, filming was suspended, and the episodes transmitted per week were decreased to three on Mondays, Wednesdays and Fridays. For three weeks of June 2020, two episodes of Emmerdale were transmitted per week in order to preserve episodes. At the end of June, episodes returned to three per week. In September, Emmerdale returned to its regular transmission count of six weekly episodes. In January 2022, it was announced that after 32 years, Emmerdale's transmission time would move to 7:30 pm, due to the ITV Evening News receiving a longer duration, with Thursday's episodes merged into one hour-long slot. The new scheduling began on Monday 7 March 2022. The change meant that Emmerdale once again clashed with EastEnders, this time being a daily occurrence.

In February 2025, ITV announced that Emmerdale and Coronation Street would each air as half-hour episodes on weekdays beginning January 2026, with the two programmes becoming part of an 8 pm "soap power hour"; an ITV executive explained that "soap viewers are increasingly looking to the soaps for their pacey storytelling. Streaming-friendly, 30 minute episodes better provide the opportunity to meet viewer expectations for storyline pace, pay-off and resolution." Episodes will continue to premiere on ITVX prior to their television broadcast.

=== International broadcast ===
Emmerdale reaches viewers in the Republic of Ireland via Virgin Media One, which broadcasts the series simultaneously with ITV in the UK. Emmerdale was formerly broadcast during the day on RTÉ One from 1972 to 2001, before it moved to TV3, now known as Virgin Media One. RTÉ were several months behind; for many years, they broadcast the show five days a week (instead of ITV's three days a week) and took a break during the summer. As the series began a five-night week, RTÉ fell behind the ITV broadcasts; the gap between RTÉ One's last episode and TV3's first episode was approximately three months. In 2015, UTV (the Northern Irish ITV Region holder) decided to buy the rights to ITV programming for the Republic of Ireland. It was broadcast on UTV Ireland (now Virgin Media Three) in 2015 and 2016, it was then moved back to TV3 (now known as Virgin Media one) when Virgin Media Ireland, the owners of the TV3 Group (now known as Virgin Media Television Ireland) bought UTV Ireland from ITV, following the sale of UTV to ITV a few months previously.

The series has appeared in Sweden as Hem till gården ("Home to the Farm") since the 1970s – originally on TV2, and since 1994, on TV4. Emmerdale is the most-watched daytime non-news programme in Sweden, attracting from 150,000 to 200,000 viewers daily. The programme appears in Finland on MTV3 where it attracts an average of 200,000 to 250,000 viewers per episode, making it the most watched non-Finnish every-weekday program in Finnish television. Ratings have, however, declined in the past few years, previously being consecutively around 350,000 to 400,000 per episode. Emmerdale is broadcast in New Zealand on TVNZ 1, where it is the second-most-watched daytime programme, after the news. Emmerdale was broadcast in Australia for the first time in July 2006, when UKTV began airing the series with episode 4288. Emmerdale has been available to viewers in the United States via the BritBox streaming service since March 2017. New episodes typically appear on the service within five hours of their original broadcast in the UK.

== Production ==
=== Filming locations ===
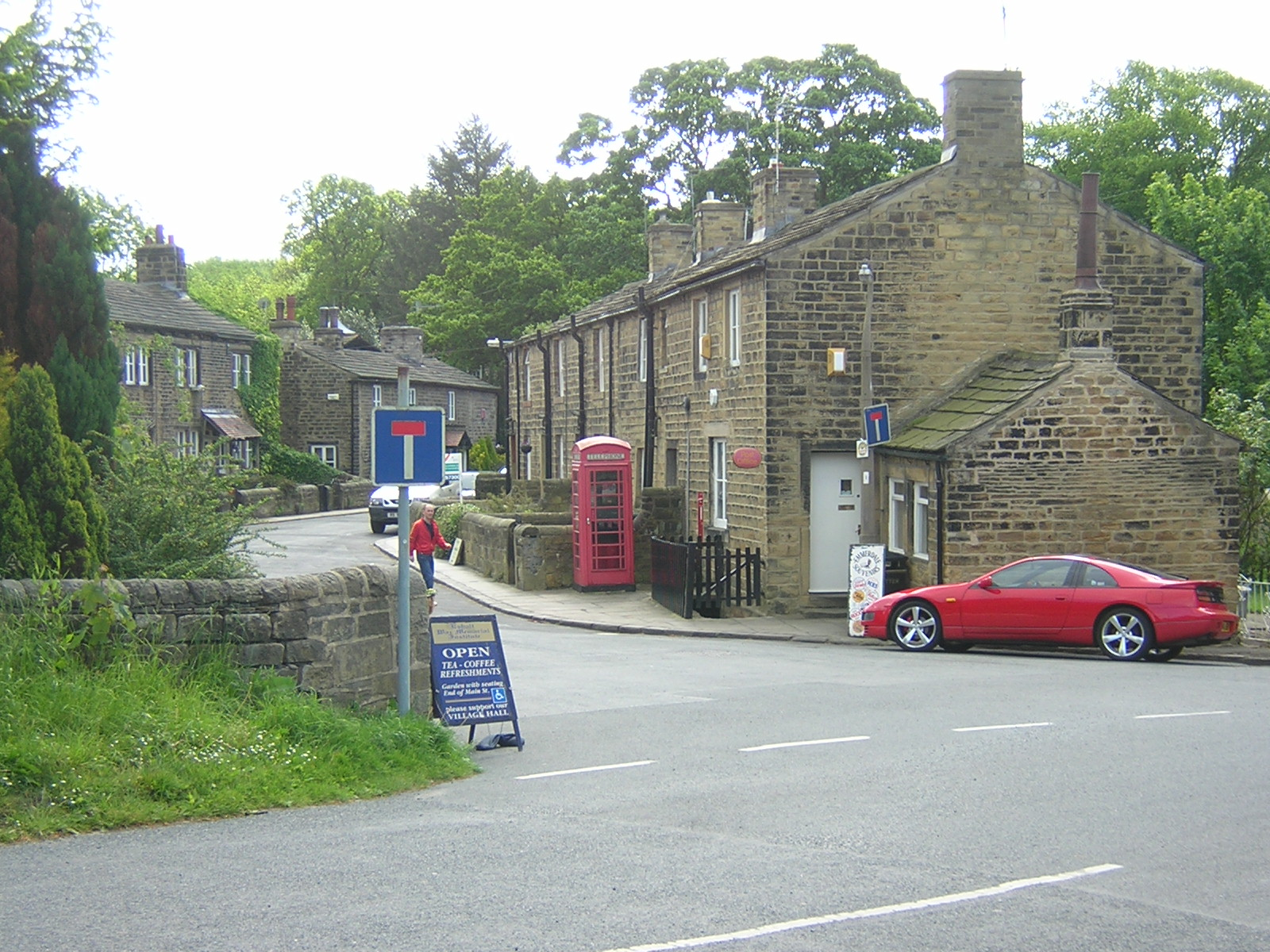
Esholt, West Yorkshire, used for exterior scenes from 1976 to 1997

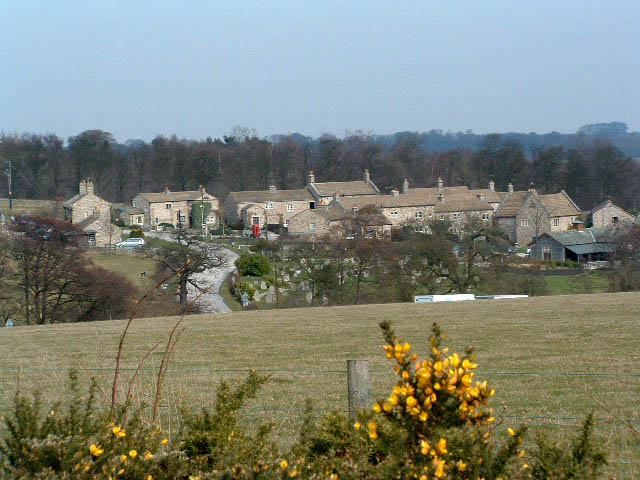
Village set, built by Yorkshire Television in 1997 on the Harewood estate near Eccup, Leeds, West Yorkshire

The original Emmerdale Farm buildings are located near to the village of Leathley. The buildings are one of the few original filming locations used for the entire series and have been involved in numerous storylines. Scenes initially filmed in the farmhouse were filmed at Lindley Farm, owned by Arthur Peel, a farmer. Laffan and the researchers found his farm ideal for scenes and the location was large enough for cast and crew members to park their vehicles there. Yorkshire Television promised Peel to keep his identity and the location of his farm a secret, but viewers eventually discovered both and would visit in the hopes of meeting the cast there. Location shooting was originally filmed in the village of Arncliffe in Littondale, a quiet valley in the Yorkshire Dales. The Falcon, the village hotel, served as the fictional Woolpack Inn. After four years of filming there, it was moved to the village of Esholt in 1976. The Woolpack's real-life location was changed to Commercial Inn in Esholt, and eventually, the real owner of the inn agreed to change the name to the Woolpack.

After the soap began transmitting episodes 52 weeks of the year, the production needed more space. This led to the purchase of a four-floor mill in Farsley for £2 million, which a building team converted into the Emmerdale Production Centre. Construction of another purpose-built set began on the Harewood estate in 1996 and it has been used since 1997, after being opened by Prime Minister John Major. The Harewood set is a replica of Esholt, with minor alterations. Filming returned to Esholt in 2016 for a special episode centred around Ashley Thomas' (John Middleton) dementia which aired in December 2016. The location was used to represent Ashley's onset of dementia to the viewer. Location filming is also done in the City of Leeds and other West Yorkshire locations; scenes set in the fictional market town of Hotten are currently filmed in Otley, and previously in Farsley. Benton Park School in Rawdon and the primary school in Farnley were also used for filming. Interiors are primarily filmed at Yorkshire Television's Emmerdale Production Centre in Leeds, next to Yorkshire's Leeds Studios.

Four farms have been featured on Emmerdale over the years:

Name	Year(s)	Summary	Location
Emmerdale Farm	1972–1993	Belonged to the Sugden family for many years, until subsidence forces them to move.	Lindley Farm
Hawthorn Cottage	1993–1997	Matt (Frederick Pyne) and Peggy Skilbeck's (Jo Kendall) former home until it is sold and converted into a quarry.	Bank Side Farm
Melby Farm	1997–2002	A farm that goes bankrupt, leaving Jack Sugden (Clive Hornby) to move into a cottage in the village.	Burden Head Farm
Butler's Farm	2003–present	Acquired by Andy Sugden (Kelvin Fletcher) and Katie Addyman (Sammy Winward) in 2003, before the Barton family take the farm over in 2009.	Brookland Farm

=== Sponsors ===
Emmerdale's first sponsor (from 14 December 1999 to 20 February 2002) was Daz detergent, followed by Heinz Tomato Ketchup and Heinz salad cream from May 2003 to May 2005, a deal that cost Heinz £10 million. Reckitt Benckiser took over until 2009 in another £10 million deal, advertising Calgon, Air Wick, Veet, and Lemsip. After reports of Littlewoods pulling out of a two-year deal, Tombola Bingo underwrote the show from November 2009 to March 2012, followed by Bet365 Bingo until March 2014. McCain Foods began a two-year £8 million sponsorship on 7 April 2014. Then on 15 April 2020, the People's Postcode Lottery took over as sponsor of the programme. Two years later, Confused.com replaced the People's Postcode Lottery as Emmerdale's sponsor until July 2024. In August, Specsavers replaced Confused.com.

== Reception ==
=== Ratings ===
As of 2024, Emmerdale generally attracts an average of 4 million viewers. During the 1990s, the series had an average of 10–11 million viewers per episode. On 30 December 1993, Emmerdale had its largest-ever audience of 18 million when a plane crashed into the village. On 27 May 1997, 13 million viewers saw Frank Tate (Norman Bowler) die of a heart attack after the return of wife Kim (Claire King). On 20 October 1998, 12.5 million viewers saw the Woolpack explode after a fire. Kim Tate's departure from the show on 19 January 1999 was watched by nearly 15 million viewers.

The village storm on 1 January 2004 attracted 11.19 million viewers. 18 May 2004 episode in which Jack was shot by his adopted son, Andy, attracted 8.27 million viewers. On 17 March 2005, 9.39 million watched Shelley Williams fall from the Isle of Arran ferry. Zoe Tate (Leah Bracknell) left the show after 16 years on 22 September 2005 before 8.58 million viewers, marking her departure by blowing up Home Farm. On 13 July 2006, the Kings River house collapse was seen by 6.90 million viewers. Sadie King (Patsy Kensit) and Cain Dingle (Jeff Hordley) left on 21 September 2006, before an audience of 8.57 million viewers. On Christmas Day 2006, 7.69 million saw Tom King (Kenneth Farrington) murdered on his wedding day. Billy Hopwood (David Crellin) crashed his truck into a lake on 1 February 2007, attracting 8.15 million viewers. The end of the "Who Killed Tom King?" storyline on 17 May 2007, had an audience of 8.92 million.

On 14 January 2010, 9.96 million saw Mark Wylde shot dead by wife Natasha. Natasha's 27 October confession to daughter Maisie attracted an audience of nearly 8 million. On 13 January 2011, 9.15 million saw a fire kill Viv Hope and Terry Woods. The live 40th-anniversary episode on 17 October 2012, drew an audience of 8.83 million. On 16 October 2013, 8.15 million watched Cameron Murray take the occupants of The Woolpack hostage and shoot Alicia. The next day, 7.65 million viewers saw Cameron die. In January 2022, their overnight viewing figures saw Emmerdale become the most watched soap opera in the United Kingdom. They beat Coronation Street, a fellow ITV soap that had consistently beaten Emmerdale in the ratings. The rise in viewers was accredited to Meena's serial killer storyline.

Average, highest and lowest ratings for Emmerdale by year
Year	Number of episodes	Average viewers (millions)	Highest rating (millions)	Lowest rating (millions)
1998 (Note: The ratings are not available before 29 June 1998, so viewing figures are available for only 85 episodes.)	162	11.27	13.91	9.53
1999	165	11.28	14.97	8.80
2000	188	10.69	13.25	8.25
2001	261	9.71	12.42	7.16
2002	263	9.21	11.79	6.97
2003	279	9.24	11.88	5.94
2004	314	9.00	11.76	5.71
2005	310	8.63	11.18	5.66
2006	313	7.63	9.86	3.38
2007	314	7.44	9.38	4.84
2008	311	6.93	8.85	4.57
2009	310	6.72	8.54	4.50
2010	312	7.34	9.96	4.60
2011	316	7.10	9.15	4.20
2012	315	6.67	8.83	4.01
2013	317	6.57	8.15	4.66
2014	313	5.74	7.18	3.82
2015	320	5.41	6.53	4.04
2016	323	6.01	8.03	4.52
2017	319	6.44	7.54	5.10
2018	323	6.45	7.72	4.98
2019	339	6.05	7.03	4.75
2020	243	5.88	6.94	4.48
2021	318	4.90	5.94	3.66
2022 (Note: The viewing figure for Episode 9469 (18th September 2022) is unknown.)	314	4.56	5.69	3.20
2023	313	4.10	4.78	3.31
2024	301	3.92	4.60	3.18
2025	301	3.71	4.38	2.98

=== Critical and viewer response ===
Numerous Emmerdale storylines have been criticised by viewers, due to suggestions that they are too controversial. In March 2022, Leeds Live compiled a list of top storylines that viewers were disgusted by, with the list including Cain Dingle (Jeff Hordley) having sex with an underage Ollie Reynolds (Vicky Binns), Charity Dingle (Emma Atkins) having a baby with her second-cousin Cain, Aaron Livesy (Danny Miller) assisting a quadriplegic Jackson Walsh (Marc Silcock) to die, Maya Stepney (Louisa Clein) grooming step-son Jacob Gallagher (Joe-Warren Plant) and Pierce Harris (Jonathan Wrather) raping Rhona Goskirk (Zoë Henry).

Another storyline that attracted a strong viewer response is an arc that saw Meena Jutla (Paige Sandhu) be revealed as a serial killer, with her confessing to two off-screen murders, as well as murdering regulars Leanna Cavanagh (Mimi Slinger), Andrea Tate (Anna Nightingale) and Ben Tucker (Simon Lennon). Meena immediately caused division in viewers' opinions from her introduction, and after Meena is revealed to be a serial killer, critics and viewers began to praise the character and Sandhu's acting skills, with many believing Meena had become a "top soap serial killer".

Duncan Lindsay of the Metro described Meena as "the most unique and entertaining soap villain ever" and admitted that he wanted her to get away with her crimes due to her strong presence on Emmerdale. Many viewers praised Meena, and credited her with being the most interesting part of Emmerdale, while some complained about the violence shown in her murderous scenes, with Ofcom receiving hundreds of complaints about her brutality.

Despite criticism, Meena regularly trended on Twitter and garnered an online fandom, the 'Meeniacs', who felt that the soap would not be the same following her exit. Her storyline also increased Emmerdale's ratings to the point of becoming the most-watched soap opera in the United Kingdom. In 2021, Sandhu was nominated for Best Newcomer and Best Villain at the 2021 Inside Soap Awards, and Meena's murder of Leanna was nominated for Best Show-Stopper. She went on to win the award for Best Villain.

== See also ==
- List of Emmerdale characters
- List of Emmerdale spin-offs and merchandise
