= List of Emmerdale characters introduced in 2025 =

Emmerdale is a British soap opera that first aired on 16 October 1972. The following characters made or will make their debut in 2025. Caroline Harker made her debut as Caitlin Todd, a doctor that Jacob Gallagher (Joe-Warren Plant) works with, in January, which also featured the one-off appearance of Henry (James Graeme). Rich Thompson (Joshua John), Jacob's friend and fellow medical student, also began appearing in January. Fred Kettle debuted that same month as Dylan Penders, a homeless teenager that befriends April Windsor (Amelia Flanagan). March saw the arrival of Kammy Hadiq (Shebz Miah). April saw the arrival of Aidan Moore (Geoff Dignan). May saw the arrival of Lewis Barton (Bradley Riches). June saw the arrival of DS Walsh (Amanda Ryan) and Celia Daniels (Jaye Griffiths). July saw the arrival of Ray Walters (Joe Absolom). Additionally, several other characters appear throughout the year.

== Caitlin Todd ==
Caitlin Todd
- Emmerdale character
- Portrayed by: Caroline Harker
- Duration: 2025–2026
- First appearance: Episode 10,179; 2 January 2025
- Last appearance: Episode 10,634; 10 August 2026
- Introduced by: Iain MacLeod
In-universe information
- Occupation: Doctor

Dr. Caitlin Todd, portrayed by Caroline Harker made her first appearance on 2 January. She is a doctor that medical student Jacob Gallagher (Joe-Warren Plant) works with during his first shift of his placement in A&E. Following the character's debut, viewers on Twitter wondered where they recognised Harker from. Olivia Wheeler from Leicester Mercury said viewers were "left distracted" after "they noticed where they had seen Dr Caitlin star Caroline Harker before as Jacob Gallagher made a huge mistake." Caitlin mentors Jacob during his first shift and reminds him that whilst it can be exciting, these are real people. When Jacob tells Marlon Dingle (Mark Charnock) and Rhona Goskirk (Zoë Henry) that he believes that Marlon's daughter, April Windsor (Amelia Flanagan), is in hospital, she tells him off for not following the correct procedures. When it is revealed that the girl was not April and Marlon and Rhona were told that she had died, Todd shouts at Jacob. At the end of the shift, Jacob tells her that he cannot handle it, so she consoles Jacob and encourages him to not quit. She tells him to not feel bad about not being with Henry when he died as he knew that Jacob cared about him.

On 10 February 2026, it was announced that Harker would return as Doctor Todd for an "extended run". This time, she will be part of a storyline that portrays the "troubling reality of workplace bullying." Todd will constantly be criticising Jacob and finding faults in his work whilst she is mentoring him, which turns his professional life into a "battleground". ITV has revealed that the storyline will "delve into Jacob's struggle to manage his work-life balance under the immense pressure of his overbearing boss." A synopsis teased: "The storyline will delve into Jacob's struggle to manage his work-life balance under the immense pressure of his overbearing boss. The stakes are raised further when Doctor Todd installs herself in the village, blurring the lines between Jacob’s professional and private life." Speaking about her return, Harker said: "I'm delighted to be back at Emmerdale for a longer stint playing Doctor Todd. She's a complex character and from what I've been told so far, quite a tricky one for Jacob to navigate. Workplace bullying is commonplace, and it will be interesting to see it brought to our screens in a serial drama such as Emmerdale." Producer Laura Shaw added: "We are looking forward to seeing the machinations of someone like Caitlin Todd, and it's not just at the hospital where she will start to make an impression. Caroline is a fabulous actor and brings such great experience to this role - we can't wait for her to play out what we have planned for the character."

== Henry ==
Henry, played by James Graeme, made his one-off appearance on 2 January, during a special episode focused on medical student Jacob Gallagher's (Joe-Warren Plant) first shift in A&E. Henry is an elderly patient who appears throughout Jacob's first shift whilst waiting for an appointment; the pair bond and he offers comfort to Jacob, who is stressed. Henry also chats to Cain Dingle (Jeff Hordley) and he reminds him of deceased father, Zak Dingle (Steve Halliwell). It is revealed that Henry has an illness and he dies at the end of the episode, leaving Jacob heartbroken. Doctor Caitlin Todd (Caroline Harker) explains to Jacob that whilst Henry had been talking about his daughter, she had actually died many years ago and it was his way of coping; she also comforts Jacob and tells him that Henry died knowing that he cared about him. Following Henry's debut, Joe Crutchley from Leeds Live reported how viewers had speculated on social media that Henry could be related to Zak due to their resemblance. Crutchley also called Henry's death a "heartbreaking turn of events".

== Rich Thompson ==
Rich Thompson
- Emmerdale character
- Portrayed by: Joshua John
- Duration: 2025–2026
- First appearance: Episode 10,179; 2 January 2025
- Last appearance: Episode 10,555; 20 April 2026
- Introduced by: Iain MacLeod
In-universe information
- Occupation: Medical Student

Rich Thompson, played by Joshua John, made his first appearance on 2 January 2025. He is a medical student and a friend of Jacob Gallagher (Joe-Warren Plant). Following his first appearance, John's agent, Revolution Talent, reported that John would continue to play John, with his CV revealing that it is a recurring role. Rich is described as being "plucky and confident". Dan Laurie from LeedsLive described: "Some in the village have been less than impressed by Jacob's friendship with them being unsure of Rich." Joe-Warren Plant, who plays Jacob addressed the villagers concerns: "They have a lot in common doing the same job. The pressures that brings opens people up to coping mechanisms that can go down the wrong path. I think both of them struggle with that in a sense. I think Jacob can be easily led." Plant also described Jacob's friendship with Rich: "Rich is a good friend to Jacob but there's a lot of things in-between. They are not exactly built on the same morals. Jacob is always quite a nice and fairly behaved lad. Jacob has a lot going on. To let off steam, he's been taking it down the wrong path and I think his friends do have a little bit to play in that role."

On 25 February 2025, it was announced that John would be leaving Emmerdale and Rich made his final appearance on 5 March 2025. Plant described John to be a "talented and great guy." He continued: "Josh is a great lad. It was lovely working with him over the couple of months that he was here. I don't think I really gave him any advice. It was more the other way around. Josh comes from a theatre background and he's done a lot of work in London and things like that. It was nice to go back-and-forth and share stories. He's a great guy and loves the craft. He's very talented as well."

== Dylan Penders ==
Dylan Penders
- Emmerdale character
- Portrayed by: Fred Kettle
- Duration: 2025–present
- First appearance: Episode 10,208; 4 February 2025
- Introduced by: Iain MacLeod
In-universe information
- Occupation: Kitchen porter Driver

Dylan Penders, portrayed by Fred Kettle, first appeared on 4 February. He was introduced in a special episode that centred on established character April Windsor (Amelia Flanagan). Dylan is a teenager squatting whom April meets during her time on the streets. Kettle's portrayal of Dylan was praised by viewers of the soap, who demanded he should return as a regular cast member. Daniel Kilkelly from Digital Spy described Dylan's character to be "highly praised." Bradley Riches also auditioned for the role, but was instead cast as Lewis Barton.

It was later confirmed that Kettle would return to Emmerdale in March as part of a "dramatic reunion" for himself and April. April, who had been at home for several weeks, visits a derelict squat to find Dylan, unknowingly followed by her father, Marlon Dingle (Mark Charnock). Marlon jumps to the wrong conclusion and pins Dylan against a wall, who responds by asking them to leave. However, Dylan arrives in Emmerdale village the next day after an invite from April, who believes he could "make a life for himself in a close-knit community like Emmerdale". He is shocked to learn that April's child was born stillborn and named after their dead homeless friend, Becca (Becca Ashton). Wanting to please April, Marlon allows Dylan to stay in their family home until he can get clean from drugs. However, he grows weary of Dylan's presence and plants drugs stolen from Rhona Goskirk's (Zoë Henry) veterinary surgery on Dylan. With even April doubting Dylan, he leaves. Marlon is later informed that Dylan has overdosed on drugs and is in hospital; he visits Dylan with a bag of food and offers to pay for private rehabilitation for him. Marlon suggests he tells April the truth about framing him, but Dylan asks him to continue lying to avoid more disruption for April. The Metro confirmed that this was the last of Dylan's stint on the soap.

On 2 May 2025, Emmerdale producer Laura Shaw announced that Kettle would be reprising his role as Dylan. She told Digital Spy: "Lovely Fred Kettle, who plays Dylan, is coming back to the show." She also revealed that there would also be some new arrivals as part of Dylan's storyline: "He's going to be bringing his past back to the village with him. And that's going to cause huge problems for April and the wider family there. We've got a couple of exciting new castings that are joining us for that story, but I'm not allowed to tell you who they are. Watch this space, because it's very exciting." It was later revealed that he would be involved with Ray Walters (Joe Absolom).

== Rebecca Windsor ==
Rebecca Windsor
- Emmerdale character
- Portrayed by: Unknown
- Appears in: Episode 10,208; 4 February 2025
- Introduced by: Iain MacLeod
In-universe information
- Mother: April Windsor
- Grandfathers: Marlon Dingle
- Grandmothers: Donna Windsor
- Uncles: Leo Goskirk

Rebecca Windsor is the stillborn daughter of April Windsor (Amelia Flanagan) who appeared on 4 February 2025. April gave birth to Rebecca whilst she was living on the streets. April was rushed to hospital after being found in a terrible condition on a park bench. After April's father, Marlon Dingle (Mark Charnock) and stepmother, Rhona Goskirk (Zoë Henry) were reunited with her, they struggled to reconnect with her.

On 27 February 2025, April had a meeting with her social worker which Marlon had organised so he and Rhona would also be in, however April asked if they could leave so she could speak to the social worker alone. This time alone allowed April to be honest about her feelings. After the meeting, April told Marlon and Rhona that she wanted to register her daughter's birth. April named her daughter Rebecca after Becca (Becca Ashton), whom she befriended whilst homeless and was fatally stabbed.

== Eddie Crowley ==
Eddie Crowley
- Emmerdale character
- Portrayed by: James Hillier
- First appearance: Episode 10,221/2; 20 February 2025
- Last appearance: Episode 10,342/3; 17 July 2025
- Introduced by: Iain MacLeod
In-universe information
- Occupation: Doctor

Doctor Eddie Crowley, portrayed by James Hillier, is Joe Tate's (Ned Porteous) private doctor who helps him steal a kidney from his uncle Caleb Miligan (William Ash), who was a match. He first appeared on 20 February 2025. Initially he and Joe spiked his younger half-brother, Noah Dingle (Jack Downham) to see if he was a match. However, this caused a limosine crash, claiming the lives of Leyla Harding (Roxy Shahidi), Amy Barton (Natalie Ann Jamieson) and Suzy Merton (Martelle Edinborough). After getting Caleb stabbed, he took his kidney and performed an illegal kidney transplant. Crowley then departed on 31 March 2025, but later returned after he was suspended from the medical profession by the General Medical Council (GMB) after the surgery and never mentioned Joe's name, therefore leading him to believe he owed him. Crowley returned on 10 July 2025 as Kim Tate's (Claire King) new love interest. This was part of a plan to get money out of Kim and Joe.

Speaking to Digital Spy, King said: "He's very bad and very nasty and he will go to any lengths to get Kim's money – and he kind of does." She added: "But there's always a twist… The minute Kim finds out, it'll be more than his back he needs to watch out for! I mean that." Hillier's return was announced on 7 July 2025 and Porteous discussed his excitement of his return. He said: "He's a really lovely guy. "I enjoy working with him - he's a nice dude and the character that he built is fun. It's got more dimensions and it serves as a very interesting character going forward. Hopefully the audience will like what we do with it because it gets a bit crazy. I'm personally really proud of the work that we did over those weeks. I'm really excited to see how they come out. It was really good fun working on that." Porteous also revealed that he knew Joe and Crowley would cross paths again: "We kind of knew on set; everyone kind of knows how long you're going to be sticking around for. It certainly wasn't a surprise to him [Hillier]. We didn't know the exact detail of how he was going to be coming back but it wasn't a complete surprise. It was a nice thing to see him around on the set."

== Kammy Hadiq ==
Kammy Hadiq
- Emmerdale character
- Portrayed by: Shebz Miah
- Duration: 2025–present
- First appearance: Episode 10,243/4; 18 March 2025
- Introduced by: Iain MacLeod
In-universe information
- Occupation: Mechanic

Kamal ‘Kammy’ Hadiq, portrayed by Shebz Miah, made his first appearance on 18 March 2025. Miah's casting was announced on 25 February 2025 and his character was described as a "bad boy" whose arrival will "ruffle some feathers." Upon arrival, he stole a quad bike from Moira Dingle's (Natalie J Robb) farm, which Ross Barton (Michael Parr) will be under suspicion for. He was then approached by Sarah Sugden (Katie Hill) when he struggled to start the quad bike, before Ross approached. Emmerdale bosses teased that Kammy would bring "an element of danger, romance, excitement and, above all else, his inherent charm" with him to the village.

Miah commented on his casting: "I'm absolutely thrilled to be joining the cast of Emmerdale. Everyone has been so welcoming and I already feel like a part of the family. I honestly couldn't have asked for a better job – the character is such an exciting one to play and Kammy will definitely ruffle a few feathers, but he does have the gift of the gab so although he causes a lot of mischief, I think it will be hard not to like him!" Emmerdale producer Laura Shaw said that she was "delighted" with Miah's casting, teasing that Kammy has a softer side and is "ultimately kind at heart". She described Kammy to be "charismatic, with a very playful spirit [and] promises to bring both excitement and danger to the village." Katie Hill, who plays Sarah, also expressed her excitement about Kammy's arrival: "I can't wait for the audience to meet Kammy - he's a really fun character and a great addition to the village. We might even see him and Sarah get up to a bit of mischief together... It has been great having Shebz join the cast and he's been brilliant to work with!"

For his role as Kammy, Miah was shortlisted for Best Newcomer at the 2025 British Soap Awards. Laura-Jayne Tyler from Inside Soap chose Kammy as one of her four "Unsung Heroes" of British soap opera characters of 2025, calling him an "Emmerdale joy-bringer".

== Aidan Moore ==
Aidan Moore
- Emmerdale character
- Portrayed by: Geoff Dignan
- First appearance: Episode 10,262; 9 April 2025
- Last appearance: Episode 10,303; 27 May 2025
- Introduced by: Iain MacLeod
In-universe information
- Mother: Cathleen Moore

Aidan Moore, portrayed by Geoff Dignan, is the ex-fiancé of John Sugden (Oliver Farnworth), who is in hospital in Leeds as he is in a coma. He first appears on 9 April 2025, when John visits him in hospital. He had previously told his sister, Victoria Sugden (Isabel Hodgins) that Aidan was dead, but later revealed to her that he was alive, but in a coma after she meets one of John's ex-army platoon mates, Connor and invites him to his stag do as he is set to marry Aaron Dingle (Danny Miller). John then reveals that he actually tried to save his Aidan's life, but as a result starved his brain of oxygen, causing him to go into the coma. Aaron's best man, Mackenzie Boyd (Lawrence Robb) also found this out and told Aaron.

On 2 May 2025, Emmerdale producer, Laura Shaw revealed that there would be two shocks for John as his wedding to Aaron approaches. One of which would be Aidan: "We've got Aidan in a coma, and I can tell you that he's absolutely not going to be in a coma forever. So is he going to wake up, and if he does, what secrets could he come back with? Is he going to walk in and spoil the wedding? We'll have to see." On 5 June 2025, Dignan confirmed his departure. He posted: "I had an absolute blast playing Aidan Moore in #emmerdale I've met great people from the crew to the very talented cast.Thank you to my agent @StarkTalentUK." Dignan also discussed whether he would return or not: "Who knows what's in store 4 Aidan, after all it is Emmerdale, he's woke up once... why not one more time."

== Lewis Barton ==
Lewis Barton
- Emmerdale character
- Portrayed by: Bradley Riches
- Duration: 2025–present
- First appearance: Episode 10,293; 15 May 2025
- Introduced by: Iain MacLeod
In-universe information
- Occupation: Café co-owner
- Father: Kev Barton
- Mother: Emma Barton
- Adoptive father: Jeffrey Bernes
- Adoptive mother: Anne Bernes
- Half-brothers: Pete Barton; Ross Barton; Finn Barton
- Grandfathers: Baz Townsend
- Nephews: Moses Dingle
- Nieces: Leyla Sugden

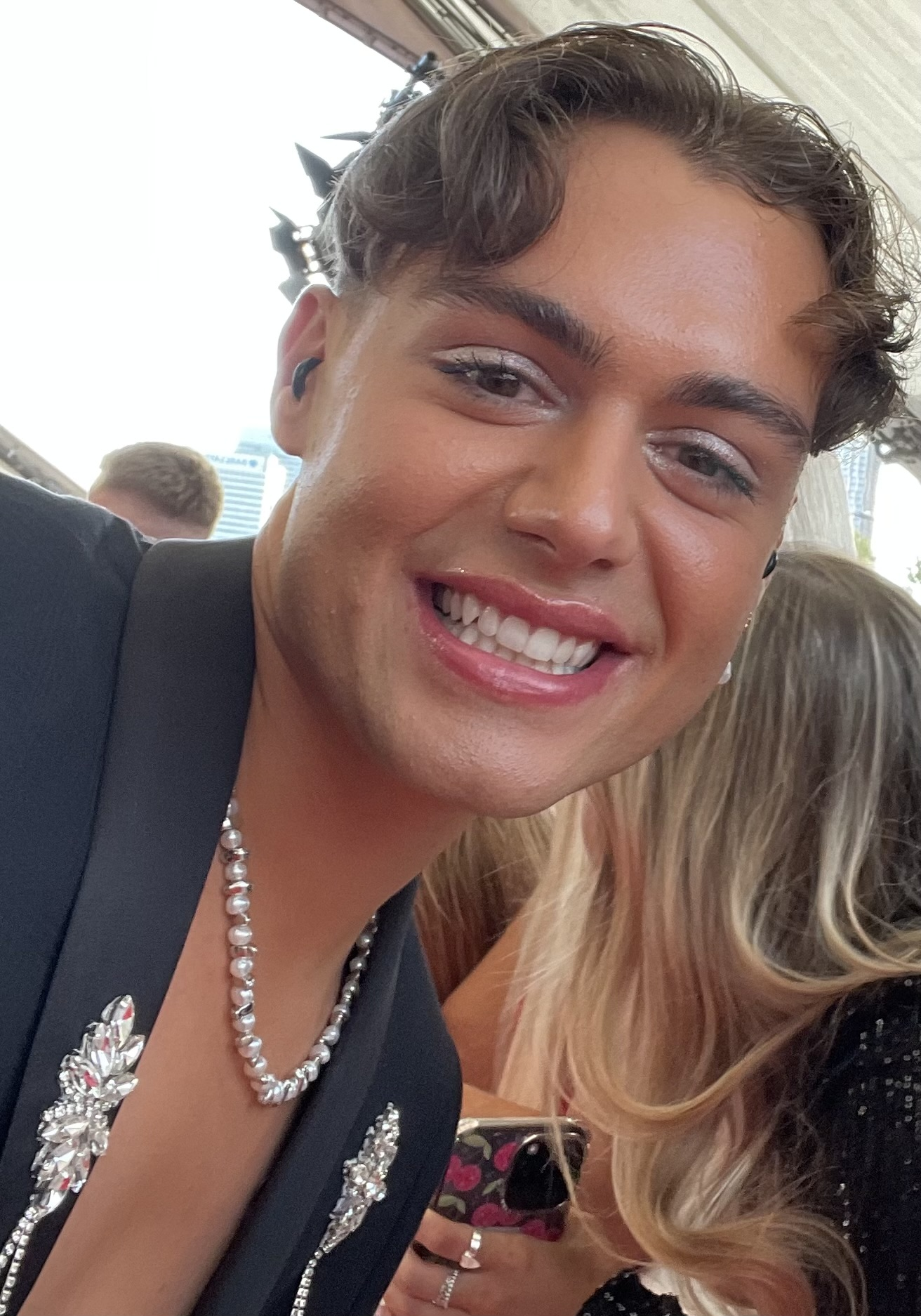
Bradley Riches portrays Lewis Barton.

Lewis Barton, portrayed by Bradley Riches, made his first appearance in the episode broadcast on 15 May 2025. Riches' casting was announced on 19 March 2025, however, further details of his character were kept privatised. Producer Laura Shaw said that more details of the character would be released in the "coming weeks". George Lewis from Digital Spy described Riches' character to be a "mysterious new role". On 24 April 2025, it was announced that Lewis was a member of the Barton family and is the brother of Ross (Michael Parr). Riches spoke about his character: "I play Lewis Barton. He's studying at Leeds University and related to Ross [portrayed by Michael Parr]." He explained Lewis has known about his brother for a while, with his storyline starting when he "finally builds up the courage to reach out to him, see if they get along and ask questions about his family". Riches shared the news of his character on Instagram with Parr, who plays Ross, commenting: "Hello brother... I guess good looks do run in the family." Like Riches, the character of Lewis is autistic. He explained that the Emmerdale writers were supportive and open to listening in order to get the language right and portray his storyline accurately: "The writers were very open to [hearing] how I would say things. For example, in the autism community, we don't say, 'I have autism.' I don't mind, but some disagree because it's not additional. I am autistic." Riches has revealed that Lewis' storyline won't centre around him being autistic, despite autism representation being important.

Riches spoke about his casting: "I'm beyond excited to be joining Emmerdale! It's a real bucket list moment for me, especially since it was my grandad's favourite soap, I just know he'd be over the moon. Everyone has been so lovely and welcoming, and the village is even more amazing in real life. I absolutely love my character (though I can't spill too much just yet!), and I'm just so grateful for this opportunity. I can't wait for everyone to see what's in store..." Shaw also commented on Riches' casting: "We are absolutely thrilled to welcome Bradley to the Emmerdale family. Bradley brings a wealth of talent and his warmth, wit and charisma makes him perfect for this new Emmerdale role. We have some wonderful stories for him to play and we can't wait for the audience to see Bradley bring his new character bursting into life on screen." On 24 April 2025, Riches revealed that he initially auditioned and was offered the role of Dylan Penders, but declined due to schedule conflict. He said: "I came to Leeds for a meeting for a different character: Dylan, who is in April's storyline. But then the schedule didn't work, and I thought I'd missed the opportunity." He continued: "I felt like it was meant to be. The personality of the character fits me so much better."

== DS Walsh ==
DS Walsh
- Emmerdale character
- Portrayed by: Amanda Ryan
- Duration: 2025–present
- First appearance: Episode 10,309/10; 4 June 2025
- Introduced by: Iain MacLeod
In-universe information
- Occupation: Detective Sergeant

Detective Sergeant Walsh, portrayed by Amanda Ryan, is a police officer who is investigating the murder of Nate Robinson (Jurrell Carter). Her casting was announced on 27 May 2025 and first appeared on 4 June 2025. Upon her first appearance, she is involved in a case where a body is found in the lake. Ruby Fox-Miligan (Beth Cordingly) initially believed it was her father, Anthony Fox's (Nicholas Day), who John Sugden (Oliver Farnworth) helped to dispose of and confessed to Walsh. The body, however was later revealed to be Nate, who was murdered by John the previous year.

Anita Markoff from The Mirror suggested Ryan's casting "marks a major addition to the ITV soap, which comes hot on the heels of another high-profile signing," after her former Casualty co-star, Jaye Griffiths was cast as Celia Daniels. Markoff also revealed: "Her character is bound to stir up drama as her arrival on the scene as a detective means the truth about Nate's death with start to unravel." Phoebe Tonks from Leicester Mercury revealed that Walsh would be rival for her former co-star's upcoming character.

== DC Cole ==
DC Cole
- Emmerdale character
- Portrayed by: Philip Hill-Pearson
- First appearance: Episode 10,309/10; 4 June 2025
- Last appearance: Episode 10,370; 20 August 2025
- Introduced by: Iain MacLeod
In-universe information
- Occupation: Detective Constable

Detective Constable Cole, portrayed by Philip Hill-Pearson, first appeared on 4 June 2025. He was introduced as a police officer investigating the murder of Nate Robinson (Jurrell Carter). Hill-Pearson had previously played Jared Haynes, a friend of Amy Wyatt (Chelsea Halfpenny) for five episodes in July and August 2011, which was where fans recognised him from. After Ruby Miligan (Beth Cordingly) heard the news that a body was found, she believed it was her abusive father Anthony Fox's (Nicholas Day), who John Sugden (Oliver Farnworth) helped to dispose of. Cole ended up going to The Mill to question Ruby's husband, Caleb Miligan (William Ash) and her daughter, Steph Miligan (Georgia Jay). The body, however was later revealed to be Nate, who was murdered by John the previous year.

In August 2025, after John tries to frame Owen Michaels (Simon Haines) for Nate's murder, Cole returns to tell his father, Cain Dingle (Jeff Hordley) and wife, Tracy Shankley (Amy Walsh) that new evidence had surfaced. He explains that the suicide note found on his laptop was saved after his death, meaning that Nate's killer still had not been caught.

== Celia Daniels ==
Celia Daniels
- Emmerdale character
- Portrayed by: Jaye Griffiths
- Duration: 2025–2026
- First appearance: Episode 10,331; 30 June 2025
- Last appearance: Episode 10,481; 23 January 2026
- Introduced by: Iain MacLeod
In-universe information
- Occupation: Farmer; Drug Dealer
- Adoptive sons: Ray Walters (foster)

Celia Daniels, portrayed by Jaye Griffiths, is a "no-nonsense" farmer who first appeared on 30 June 2025. Griffith's casting was announced on 26 May 2025. She first appears when she asks Moira Dingle (Natalie J Robb) if she can rent two of her fields. Joe Anderton from Digital Spy described the storyline: "Despite Moira's financial struggles, she is hesitant to take Celia up on her offer, as her reputation precedes her. It's not as easy to just shrug the whole thing off as Moira would like, however, as Celia means business." Anderton also described Celia's character to be "tough" and "mysterious". In later scenes, Paddy Kirk (Dominic Brunt) was bitten by one of Celia's guard dogs, leaving him hospitalised. Anderton described: "Her reaction will be a hint at her true colours." It has also been teased that Celia's arrival will have an effect on the Sugden and Barton families causing a new conflict for both "farming clans".

Griffiths spoke about her casting: "I was delighted to get this role — without giving the game away she is very different to anyone I have played before and I can't wait to really get into the heart of her storyline." Producer Laura Shaw added: "We are absolutely delighted to have Jaye Griffiths joining us to play the role of Celia." She continued: "Having recently taken over a nearby farm, not much is known about mysterious Celia's past before arriving on the outskirts of the village. While Celia has a tough edge with an air of respectability, the audience, and our villagers, will soon start to see what this woman is truly capable of." On 2 October 2025, it was revealed that Celia was the adoptive mother and boss of Ray Walters (Joe Absolom), who has been coercing April Windsor (Amelia Flanagan) and Dylan Penders (Fred Kettle) into dealing drugs to pay off his debts. Griffiths revealed there was "lots more drama to come" in what was described to be a "prominent" storyline for Emmerdale. She explained: "At last the audience have seen the familial link between her and Ray and the fact she is the mastermind behind it all. There is lots more drama to come but I feel that the context of the whole operation is now apparent and so the audience will now be fearing how trapped these kids are as it's very clear Celia and Ray are not beginners at this." Emmerdale has been working with The Salvation Army for their expertise regarding the County Lines storyline.

On 11 November 2025, Griffith's announced her character would soon depart Emmerdale after her stint which was described to be "finite". She explained: "I knew it was finite, which I am very sad about, because I would like to stay forever, but it's such a strong arc that – yes. I could have just said that, yes." Celia has been involved in a storyline to raise awareness of modern slavery, which Griffiths hoped would help raise awareness of. She said: "It's not happening somewhere far, far away, it's happening next door. She has a line to Ray, 'we never take local'. You don't take people who will be missed, you take the waifs and strays, and you give them purpose, you give them routine, and that lulls them, and you don't give them any options." She continued: "I mean, it's hideous. It's hideous. Sometimes, when I read the script, I think, 'really? You're going to make me say that?' Just when you think she's gone quite far enough, they'll make me go a bit further! So yes, it's horrendous. Hopefully, maybe conversations will start to be heard. Maybe a question will run through people's minds."

== Ray Walters ==
Ray Walters
- Emmerdale character
- Portrayed by: Joe Absolom
- Duration: 2025–2026
- First appearance: Episode 10,332/3; 1 July 2025
- Last appearance: Episode 10509; 13 February 2026
- Introduced by: Iain MacLeod
- Crossover appearances: Corriedale (2026)
In-universe information
- Occupation: Drug Dealer
- Adoptive mother: Celia Daniels (foster)

Ray Walters, portrayed by Joe Absolom, is a mechanic and old contact of Mackenzie Boyd (Lawrence Robb) who arrives as part of a "menacing" plot on 1 July 2025. Absolom's casting was announced on 31 May 2025, alongside the details of his character. His character has been described to have a "calm and collected exterior", but hides a more "menacing streak". Emily Stedman from Digital Spy explained: "He arrives on the scene claiming to sell farm machinery but it's not long before his drug dealing hustle comes to light – leading to some trouble for Mackenzie." Absolom spoke about his casting in a press conference: "What an honour to join such a talented team at Emmerdale! It's an iconic show and I'm grateful to be part of it. I can't wait to see what's in store for Ray!"

Emmerdale producer Laura Shaw said the team were "thrilled" to have Absolom as an addition to the cast and teased his upcoming "villainous" storyline. She said: "It's fantastic to have such a high calibre and immensely talented actor join our wonderful team to play the role of Ray. Charming, charismatic and effortlessly likeable, Ray is an extremely complex character who very quickly shows his dark and villainous side to some of our most loved villagers, leaving them in no doubt as to what he's capable of." It was later revealed that Ray would become involved with Lewis Barton (Bradley Riches) when he learns that Lewis grows cannabis. It was also confirmed he would share scenes with teenagers Dylan Penders (Fred Kettle) and April Windsor (Amelia Flanagan). Abolsom added: He arrives in the village and he's always got cash. So you've always got to be wary of someone with cash these days. We don't quite know why he's got that cash yet and we're going to find out slowly." On 2 October 2025, after coercing Dylan and April into drug dealing to pay off his debts, it was revealed that his boss was his adoptive mother, Celia Daniels (Jaye Griffiths). Emmerdale have been working alongside The Salvation Army for their expertise on the County Lines storyline.

After appearing on Good Morning Britain, Absolom told Richard Madeley when he asked about his future on the soap: "I hope they have 'til November, 'cause that's when my contract [ends]." Absolom had previously played Matthew Rose in the BBC One soap opera EastEnders, and Madeley and Kate Garraway asked about his different experiences with both soaps: "I did EastEnders a long time ago and I remember it being good fun, but Emmerdale seems to be genuinely a really nice place to work. I keep waiting for someone to go 'This isn't the real job, this is the real job and it's worse'. But it's really good fun. He continued: "It's quick but it's not rushed, that's what I found with Emmerdale. The crews are really good and the set is... they've built a real village. It's a proper place so they can film anywhere. That means you can work quickly but you don't feel rushed. You sorta get through it. I remember EastEnders, we would do lots and lots of talking. This seems nicer."

== Graham Connolly ==
Graham Connolly
- Emmerdale character
- Portrayed by: Macaulay Cooper
- First appearance: Episode 10,361; 8 August 2025
- Last appearance: Episode 10,406/7; 2 October 2025
- Introduced by: Iain MacLeod
In-universe information
- Other names: Mike
- Occupation: Con Artist

Graham Connolly, portrayed by Macaulay Cooper, was a con artist who posed as a supporter on an LGBTQ+ forum who Vinny Dingle (Bradley Johnson) opened up to when questioning his sexuality ahead of his wedding to Gabby Thomas (Rosie Bentham). He first appeared on 8 August 2025, however he initially used the name Mike. However, when meeting Vinny, he recorded him opening up and used it against him to extort money out of him and attacked him. These scenes sparked the best part of 300 Ofcom complaints from viewers. However, with the support from his friend Kammy Hadiq (Shebz Miah), Vinny managed to testify against Graham in court. Connolly departed the soap on 2 October 2025 after appearing in seven episodes. Joshua Halm from Metro said Graham was "one of the most vile, hateful villains to ever step foot in Emmerdale." He also described Graham to be a "grim extortionist". His departure was announced on 7 October 2025. Connolly posted on Instagram: "That's a wrap! After an unforgettable journey, all of my Emmerdale episodes have now aired. I feel incredibly grateful for this experience and this has been one of my favorite jobs to date. Huge thanks to everyone who tuned in and sent such kind messages—your support has meant the world to me!" He continued: "Playing the role of Mike, while challenging due to the character's actions, was an honor." Cooper mentioned that all his appearances were to address the importance of his storyline and acknowledged that the events have happened to people in real life. Before thanking cast, crew and fans, he elaborated: "I hope our portrayal helps bring much-needed awareness to this issue."

Halm also reported that many of Cooper's fellow cast members enjoyed working with him and said: "Apparently, though, Macaulay Cooper who plays him is actually a pretty nice guy!" Lisa Riley who plays Mandy Dingle posted: "So so so lovely working with the brilliant @macaulaycooper he played the part of mean, nasty, horrible, manipulative Mike in @emmerdale but trust me when I say-he’s a real softy, and a beautiful person. Welcome in PAMPAMANDA anytime" alongside a photo of herself and Cooper on set. Cooper responded: "Such a legend! It was absolute honour and pleasure working alongside you! Thank you for being so welcoming and making me feel at ease during our scenes! Wishing you all the best!" Johnson posted a photo of the two of them with one of the directors with the caption: "Massive shoutout to @macaulaycooper for his outstanding performance! He’s an absolute top bloke off-screen, and his portrayal of Mike is... Last night’s episode was a hard watch, but this story is crucial and has to be talked about. And it’s just the start for Vinny. This photo was taken after a long, challenging 10-scene day, which aired last night. Hats off to @marcusleetv for directing those tough scenes! #emmerdale #itv #soap #tv #behindthescenes." Cooper responded: "Legend mate! It’s been a pleasure working with you on screen and an even bigger pleasure getting to know you off screen! Phenomenal performance mate, keep smashing it brother." Other cast members who praised Cooper were Miah who said: "Top bloke mate you smashed it!!" as well as Ash Palmisciano, who plays Matty Barton who added: "Amazing scenes," and Kevin Mathurin, who plays Charles Anderson who replied: "blinding episode last night, mate. Well done to you all."

== Kev Barton ==
Kev Barton
- Emmerdale character
- Portrayed by: Chris Coghill
- Duration: 2025–present
- First appearance: Episode 10,403; 29 September 2025
- Introduced by: Iain MacLeod
In-universe information
- Other names: Kev Townsend
- Occupation: Caterer
- Father: Baz Townsend
- Husband: Robert Sugden
- Sons: Lewis Barton

Kev Barton (formerly Townsend), portrayed by Chris Coghill, is the biological father of Lewis Barton (Bradley Riches), who is introduced as Robert Sugden's (Ryan Hawley) husband whom he married whilst in prison. He first appeared on 29 September 2025. His casting was announced on 24 July 2025 and Joe Anderton from Digital Spy described his character to be a "mysterious role" who will "shake things up" in Emmerdale. Kev is due to arrive in the village looking for directions, however it seems that he is actually looking for someone, but it is unknown who and why. Executive producer Laura Shaw commented on Coghill's casting: "We are delighted that someone of Chris' calibre has joined our cast. I think the viewers will be intrigued to see how the character of Kev will cause shockwaves this autumn. Kev has a strong connection to one of our characters and it's safe to say his arrival is going to be a massive surprise that will have major repercussions for some of our villagers." Coghill added: "I am really happy to be joining the cast of Emmerdale. Kev is definitely going to shake things up a bit and I'm looking forward to getting cracking!" Coghill revealed that he had previously worked on Emmerdale before: "Weirdly, my first ever job was on Emmerdale. I was 17 years old. I've also done Coronation Street – I've done the lot. It's very different to EastEnders. It's nice to be here."

On 23 September 2025, more details regarding Kev's arrival were revealed. A source told Digital Spy: "Kev's arrival sends Robert reeling. He's desperate not to be seen with Kev and sneaks him inside, out of view. Later they're looking pretty cosy, leaving Victoria to wonder if this is Robert's prison boyfriend…" They continued: "Robert wants to leave prison in the past. Robert's hinted at struggling to survive in there, and Kev's arrival is about to unearth everything he's tried to keep secret from his loved ones…" Since Robert has returned to Emmerdale, he has suffered with PTSD and reveals he was bullied in prison. After Kev leaves, Victoria grills him causing him to explain himself. The source continued: "Robert doesn't look overjoyed to be reunited with Kev. We don't know what he faced inside or what he had to do to get by. But if he and Kev were lovers, this might put a spanner in the works for any hope Robert has of reuniting with Aaron Dingle (Danny Miller)." When Kev arrives, his identity as Robert's husband is revealed. His sister, Victoria Sugden (Isabel Hodgins) is far from pleased by the revelation. Coghill spoke about his role as Kev: "I'm thoroughly enjoying my time on Emmerdale so far. It's an absolutely lovely place to work, the village is stunning and everyone is genuinely lovely."

On 14 October 2025, Coghill revealed more details regarding his character. Kev was released from prison after an armed robbery, however he is terminally ill. Coghill said: "People thought, here's another baddie – but he isn't." Ryan Hawley added to the discussion: "Kev is a really complex character, there's so much to him. He's not even a baddie. He's got a lot of redeeming qualities. There's a lot going on and you'll see that as the weeks play out. There's more to him than meets the eye." Coghill continued: "He's an incredibly dangerous person. Kev wouldn’t have any qualms about physically attacking anybody, apart from possibly Robert." Coghill described Kev to be an "unhinged spanner in the works" for Robron. Hawley revealed that Kev has "something very different and volatile. Dangerous [but] not in a calculated way like John was. Unhinged and unpredictable, in a reactionary kind of way. He's something very different. Also he's redeemable, you kind of feel sorry for him." Coghill continued: "I pretty much always play wrong 'uns. I do do stuff that gets a reaction. This isn't on the same level. I think people will be surprised by what I'm doing. One day I can be a psychopath and the next day I'm doing something quite touching. Baking cakes!"

== Anya ==
Anya
- Emmerdale character
- Portrayed by: Alia Al-Shabibi
- First appearance: Episode 10,420; 22 October 2025
- Last appearance: Episode 10,445; 21 November 2025
- Introduced by: Iain MacLeod
In-universe information
- Daughters: Raina

Anya, portrayed by Alia Al-Shabibi, is a woman who arrives in Emmerdale stowed away in one of Caleb Miligan's (William Ash) vans that arrives at the depot where he is trying to settle things with his nephew Joe Tate (Ned Porteous). She made her first appearance on 22 October 2025. Caleb and his wife Ruby (Beth Cordingly) initially take her in, but Caleb pays her to leave. It was later revealed that Anya was being enslaved by Celia Daniels (Jaye Griffiths) and her son, Ray Walters (Joe Absolom) and she was trying to escape them, but they later find her and bring her back to their farm where Bear Wolf (Joshua Richards) is also being enslaved. Whilst being kept in awful conditions, Anya and Bear struck up a friendship. Anya later ends up contracting a fever, which Ray promises to get her some antibiotics for, but before he gets them, she dies.

Richards spoke about how Anya's death would affect Bear. He explained: "Bear is absolutely horrified [by Anya's death] because he’s been told by Ray, who he trusts with his life, that everything is fine." He continued: "I think there was a glimmer of light for him [with Anya] - it was almost like a reminder of little Eve, his granddaughter. [Anya was an] almost innocent soul [who] was shining in the darkness and he recognised it." Following Anya's death, Bear was forced to dig her grave as part of a "makeshift funeral". Richards explained: "Initially, [he's] horrified. But then he's determined to make it as best as he can possibly make it for Anya," said the actor. "For Bear, it’s a very poignant and difficult thing to do. But of course he wanted to do right by her and show some kind of respect. He sings a little song to her - a song he comforts her with when she comes back after having a traumatic time, then he sings it over her grave. In a way he’s singing it to himself."

== DS Carter ==
Detective Sergeant Carter, portrayed by Lisa Diveney, is a police officer who first appeared on 27 October 2025. She talks to Kev Townsend (Chris Coghill) about an attack he allegedly made on one of his old friends and then to Ray Walters (Joe Absolom) about drug dealings in the area. Daniel Kilkelly from Digital Spy described her character to be a "no-nonsense" police officer. Sara Baalla from Leicester Mercury reported that many fans recognised Diveney from previous roles.

== Simo ==
Simo
- Emmerdale character
- Portrayed by: Steven Gidwaney
- Duration: 2025–2026
- First appearance: Episode 10,436; 10 November 2025
- Last appearance: Episode 10,564; 4 May 2026
- Introduced by: Iain MacLeod

Simo "Simo" Clarke, portrayed by Steven Gidwaney, is a man who was kept as a slave by Celia Daniels (Jaye Griffiths) and Ray Walters (Joe Absolom). He first appeared on 10 November 2025 alongside Mick (Leon Harrop). After trying to escape the farm with Bear Wolf (Joshua Richards), Simo and Mick are transferred to another farm. On 21 April 2026, it was announced that Simo would be returning as part of Bear's prison storyline, when Bear's son Paddy Kirk (Dominic Brunt) sees him in prison and asks if he'll testify at his trial.

A source told Digital Spy: "Paddy thought Simo had been murdered. He immediately thinks to use him as a witness for Bear, who is still spiralling about the bank account Ray set up for him." They continued: "However, while Simo admits that Bear doesn’t deserve to be sent down, he refuses to testify. Simo argues that he's protecting his own fragile mental health, as he doesn't want to have to relive his ordeal on Ray and Celia's farm."

== Other characters ==
Character	Portrayer(s)	Episode date(s)	Details	Ref
Nurse Logan Prior	Paislie Reid	2 January 2025	A nurse working at the hospital. When medical student Jacob Gallagher (Joe-Warren Plant) tells Marlon Dingle (Mark Charnock) and Rhona Goskirk (Zoë Henry) that he believes that their daughter April Windsor (Amelia Flanagan) is in hospital, Logan is angry and tells Jacob to go on his break.	
Paramedic	Paislie Reid	2 January 2025	A paramedic at Hotten General Hospital.	
Radiation Oncologist	Francesca Jackson	2 January 2025	An oncologist at Hotten General Hospital.	
Clinical Technologist	Katie Bernstein	2 January 2025	A clinical technologist at Hotten General Hospital.	
Surgeon	Ashley Campbell	2 January 2025	A surgeon at Hotten General Hospital.	
Becca	Becca Ashton	4 February 2025	A homeless woman that is initially hostile to April Windsor (Amelia Flanagan) when she decides to become homeless. However, she later warms to April and takes her to the street to get money from locals. A man steals April's purse whilst they are there and Becca runs after them to retrieve it. He stabs her and she dies.	
Stan	Ryan Wormald	4 February 2025	A homeless man squatting with Dylan Penders (Fred Kettle) and Becca (Becca Ashton).	
Cathleen Moore	Julia Watson	17 April 2025	The mother of Aidan Moore (Geoff Dignan), who appears at his bedside in a hospital in Leeds where he is in a coma.	
Mick	Leon Harrop	10 November - 25 December 2025	A man who has been enslaved by Celia Daniels (Jaye Griffiths) and Ray Walters (Joe Absolom).	
