= Bear Wolf (Emmerdale) =

Fictional character from Emmerdale

- Emmerdale character
- Portrayed by: Joshua Richards
- Duration: 2019–present
- First appearance: 12 February 2019
- Introduced by: Jane Hudson
In-universe information
- Other names: Edward Howelson; Teddy Wolf; Ted
- Occupation: Professional wrestler
- Sons: Paddy Kirk
- Granddaughters: Grace Dingle; Eve Dingle

Bear Wolf is a fictional character from the ITV soap opera Emmerdale, played by Joshua Richards. The character and casting were announced in January 2019 and Richards made his first appearance as Bear in the episode airing on 12 February 2019. Richards was happy to be cast and revealed that his deceased mother was a superfan of the soap. Bear was introduced as a professional wrestler and the potential father of Paddy Kirk (Dominic Brunt). The character was modelled on real-life wrestler Giant Haystacks. When Paddy finds out that his mother had an affair with Bear, he is reluctant to find out the truth about his paternity as he does not want to betray the man who he believed was his father. However, he later meets Bear and a DNA test reveals that they are father and son. Bear initially gives Paddy a bad impression but they later bond in special episodes filmed in Northern Ireland. Richards explained that Bear is surprised that he has a son but is grateful to receive genuine attention and love. Bear later moves to the Emmerdale village and his subsequent storylines see him become a grandfather, reveal that he is illiterate and support Paddy when he attempts suicide.

In 2023, Bear develops romantic feelings for Mandy Dingle (Lisa Riley), but she rejects him as she has feelings for Paddy. Bear later finds out about Mandy's Findom sex work and exposes her to Paddy ahead of their wedding. Bear also develops feelings for Claudette Anderson (Flo Wilson), but it does not go anywhere. In 2025, Emmerdale producer revealed that Bear would go missing in a new storyline and that he would be different upon his return, which prompted several fan theories. Reception to the character has been mixed from critics and viewers. Bear's love triangle with Paddy and Mandy was described as awkward by critics but the storyline where Paddy teaches him to read was praised but viewers, although they also noted a plot hole. The storyline where Bear tries to stop Mandy and Paddy from getting married was criticised by viewers who theorised that he was doing this due to his jealousy over Paddy being with Mandy. Viewers have also noted on social media about Bear's change in appearance and Kerry Barrett from Emmerdale Insider opined in 2025 that the character needed to be used more.

== Casting and characterisation ==
In January 2019, it was announced that experienced actor Joshua Richards had been cast on Emmerdale to portray Bear Wolf, a wrestler and the potential father of established character Paddy Kirk (Dominic Brunt). Emmerdale producer Kate Brooks said of Richards' casting, "We are absolutely delighted to have an actor of Joshua's calibre join our show. An actor of immense talent and charisma, he's a brilliant addition to the Emmerdale team". Richards was "delighted" to join the soap, adding, "Having been based in Yorkshire for most of my life, it's fantastic to now be filming there too. Bear Wolf is a great character and I am looking forward to seeing what's in store for him". Bear was described as being a professional wrestler who "doesn't let his age get in the way of his career in the ring". Richards' first episode as Bear aired on 12 February 2019. Richards' mother was a big fan of Emmerdale and Richards used to watch it with her when it was still called Emmerdale Farm. Richards's mother died before he was cast on the soap, with Richards commenting, "It's really sad that she couldn't be around to watch me in it. She didn't know I got the part. I just thought, if only my mum was here to see this." Richards said that his experience on the soap was not as daunting as he thought it would be and praised his colleagues for being so welcoming. He commented that the "learning curve" was quicker as he was used to acting in theatre roles where he had longer to learn the scripts, adding, "With this you throw out your short-term memory. It's a new habit to get into". Bear's character was modelled on real-life wrestler Giant Haystacks. Richards was happy that the soap modelled his character on Haystacks and liked the outfits, commenting, "It works for me because it's not spandex or budgie smugglers. And wrestling is very much theatre. Where I live in Yorkshire is where Big Daddy trained so I know it well. My neighbours knew him. There are lots of stories about his entire family". Richards liked Bear's outfits and was relieved that they were not made of spandex. Richards wore a wrestlers wig as part of Bear's wrestling costume. Brunt had liked wrestlers as a child and opined that Bear's character felt very authentic. Bear was characterised as being born in 1945. In 2023, Richards described his character as a "soft-as-butter wrestler" and believed that he would great friends with EastEnders character Eve Unwin (Heather Peace). Richards also revealed that his sister, nephews and nieces watch the soap and that his sister asks him about future storylines. Richards also said that he would cast artist Grayson Perry to be Bear's best friend due to being a fan of his work.

== Development ==
=== Introduction ===
"For all his crassness and boastfulness I think underneath there's somebody rather warm and generous. He's a man I see as being a little bit lonely and who would open up and share more, with a little encouragement".

— Richards on Bear's character (2019)

Bear is first mentioned when Mandy Dingle (Lisa Riley) tells Paddy's best friend Marlon Dingle (Mark Charnock) that the reason that she has returned to the Emmerdale village is because she found a letter revealing that Paddy's mother had an affair with "famed" wrestler Bear Wolf, who may be Paddy's biological father. Up until this revelation, Paddy had believed that another man was his biological father. Marlon and Chas are unsure about whether to tell Paddy the news, especially when Paddy says that his happiest memories of his childhood were when he and his mother followed Bear around on tour across the country to see him fight.

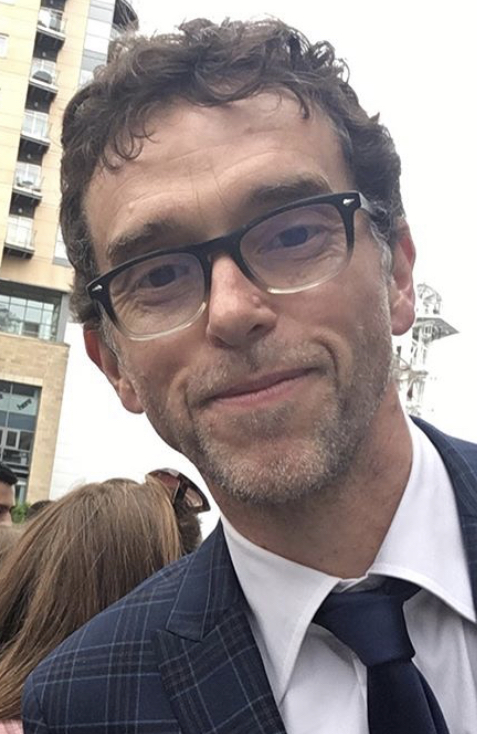
Mark Charnock (pictured) portrays Marlon, who tries to unite Paddy and Bear.

When Paddy finds out, Marlon suggests going to a wrestling convention to meet Bear, but Paddy is initially not interested in meeting Bear or finding out if he is his father; Brunt explained that this is because Paddy does not want to face the situation or lose his identity, and he does not want to sully the memory of the man who brought him up. Brunt added that the thought of Paddy's mother cheating on the man Paddy thought was his father has shocked him. Brunt added that Paddy would rather never think about the situation and initially does not want to know about the wrestling convention. However, Marlon tries to persuade Paddy to go to the wrestling convention and meet Bear as he thinks that is what is best for Paddy, with Brunt explaining, "Paddy doesn't have any blood relatives and Marlon thinks it's important that he knows either way if Bear Wolf is his father". Paddy then "Paddy bits the bullet" and decides to go to the convention; however, when they arrive there, it is slightly "anticlimactic" and disappointing for Paddy, who becomes speechless, with Brunt revealing, "They turn up at this workingmen's club and the wrestlers are at the tale-end of their careers, it's like a sad 'legends' thing. It harks back to the days of Big Daddy and Giant Haystacks - these guys are still going even though their backs have gone!" Brunt revealed that Paddy grew up idolising Bear as his favourite wrestler and used to go to his tours with his parents, and hence he is "star-struck" when he meets Bear and cannot get a sentence out. Although Paddy is nervous and stuttering, he asks Bear if he remembers his mother, Barbara, to which he replies that he has been with a lot of women; however, Paddy also notices that Bear also stutters a bit and wonders if he is where he gets it from.

Bear later admits to Paddy that he does remember Barbara and describes her as a "firecracker" and "the one that got away". Marlon and Chas push Paddy to do a DNA test but he is unsure; Brunt believed that Paddy feels like he is betraying the father who raised him, and that Paddy says he does not want a relationship with Bear even if it turns out that they are related. Brunt revealed that Paddy is disappointed by who Bear is, explaining, "Bear is a bit of a big-head so after he meets him Paddy wants nothing to do with him. Where was he when Paddy was little and needed his nappy changed, or learnt to ride a bike?" Despite Paddy and Bear's initial rocky relationship, Brunt enjoyed working with Richards, saying that he just "grabbed this role and run with it". Brunt hoped that Richards would be able to stay on the soap as Richards was "loving" his time there. Richards believed that Bear would be "quite grateful to receive any kind of attention and love which is genuine, not just for this persona that he's been inhabiting for so long". Paddy is underwhelmed at his initial meeting with Bear and convinces himself that he is not his father; however, Chas is determined to get proof, so she and Marlon for Bear to have a special 'meet and greet' session at her pub, the Woolpack, in order to get a sample of Bear's DNA. Paddy is annoyed that Marlon and Chas have gone behind his back, and he remains reluctant to find out about whether he is Bear's biological son as he feels that the man who raised him is his father "regardless of biology". The DNA test eventually reveals that Bear is Paddy's biological father.

=== Reconnecting in Northern Ireland ===
The continuation of the plot occurs in special episodes that take place in Northern Ireland. In order to find out the truth "once and for all", Paddy gatecrashes the honeymoon of Marlon and Jessie Grant (Sandra Marvin) and goes to the wrestling convention in Belfast so he can get answers from Bear, who is on a wrestling tour in Ireland, on what happened between him and his mother. The storyline saw several cast members go to location filming in Newcastle, County Down for several days. Brunt had previously teased that he and Charnock would go to Belfast for a 2019 storyline. Brunt called the scenes in Northern Ireland "hilarious, over the top but ultimately very sweet by the end". The Emmerdale cast found the Newcastle town to be very welcoming for them and one of the cafes even baked an Emmerdale cake for them, with Charnock revealing that there were many superfans of the soap in the town. Several of the cast members also went to visits parts of Northern Ireland as tourists for pleasure. Richards called the "warmth" of the people in Northern Ireland "incredible" and revealed that when he and his colleagues would go to the pub, the pub staff give them the drinks for free and would not allow them to pay.

In the storyline, Kerry Wyatt (Laura Norton) also travels with Jessie, Paddy and Marlon to find her daughter, Amy Wyatt (Natalie Ann Jamieson). Brunt explained that Paddy needs to see Bear as he believes that it can be a good thing, and that he does not want to be rejected again, but instead find a connection as he wants to be loved. Paddy ends up finding Bear at a working men's club, where Bear initially has this "massive ego". However, Paddy and Bear end up having a "breakthrough" when they have a one-to-one on the beach, and Paddy finds out that Bear is actually "really a nice chap". Brunt explained that Bear catches himself being honest and has to cover up with his "bravado", but Brunt believed that Bear was a "great character" with a "good presence". The scenes that were filmed on the beach between Richards and Brunt attracted a crowd of people that Inside Soap – who had come to see parts of the filming – suspected were fans of the soap. Richards explained that Bear is very surprised that he is Paddy's father and he believes that it is too late to be his parent as he is quite old, though Richards also believed that there would be love between the father and son despite Bear not being good at it. Richards enjoyed working with Brunt, calling him a "very fine actor" with a good sense of humour, and revealed that the pair often laugh together in scenes.

=== Life in Emmerdale ===
Bear later moves in with Chas and Paddy in Emmerdale village. In August 2019, when Bear becomes suspicious of Chas' mother Faith Dingle (Sally Dexter) and Zak Dingle (Steve Halliwell) being in the cellar together, Faith blurts out that Bear is illiterate in order to protect her secret that she kissed Zak by getting the attention off them, leaving Bear horrified. When Paddy finds out, he bonds with Bear and offers to teach him how to read, particularly the love letters that his mother had been sending to Bear. Bear asks Paddy to read the letters that his mother had written to him, which leads to Paddy finding out that his mother had told Bear that she did not love Bear as she thought and that she loved her husband instead. Wanting to protect Bear, Paddy lies about the contents of the letter, but worries that Bear will find out.

In 2023, a suicidal Paddy tells Bear how happy he is to have gotten to know him. Bear is then frantic and horrified when he finds Paddy's suicide note and he desperately tries to find his son before it is too late; Emmerdale worked with the mental health charities Andy's Man Club and the Samaritans for this mental health storyline. Paddy survives and he and Bear become "proud members" of the local Man Club, where men in the Emmerdale village meet up to do activities and talk about things on their mind. Bear and Paddy go fishing one day and Paddy tells his father that he likes hearing him talk as it keeps his mind off other things and also tells Bear how much he appreciates his support with his recovery following the suicide attempt, and Bear reflects on how Paddy has progressed since then.

=== Crush and issues with Mandy ===
That same year, Bear develops romantic feelings for Mandy, but Paddy is oblivious and has a few one-off nights with her. Bear then misunderstands a conversation with Paddy and believes that his son has given his permission to pursue Mandy, so he invites her out for lunch and tries to kiss her when he misreads the situation, leaving Mandy stunned and Bear embarrassed. The pair talk about this and Mandy admits that she has feelings for Paddy and Bear tells her to confess this to him. Mandy tells Paddy about her feelings, but he also finds out that Bear tried to kiss her. Later in 2023, Bear develops feelings for Claudette Anderson (Flo Wilson), and she confides in him about her deceased husband and her son. Richards had previously teased at the 2023 Inside Soap Awards that he wanted Bear to have some "love" and "companionship".

In 2024, Bear finds out that Mandy, who is now engaged to Paddy, has turned to online Financial domination – which includes shouting at men on camera – as she has a lot of debt. Bear finds out when he overhears Mandy's call to her client through the karaoke speakers when he is at her salon for his beard trim. Bear, believing that Mandy is cheating on Paddy, is "rattled" by Mandy's "betrayal" and struggles to compose himself, leaving Mandy uneasy when he makes some "barbed" comments; he is also unsure about whether to tell Paddy. Mandy begs Bear to listen to her reasons for why she is doing this but he threatens to tell Paddy. Mandy convinces Bear to keep quiet when she promises to stop her Findom, but she ends up going against her word when a customer gives her a chance to pay for a special honeymoon treat for Paddy. Bear becomes irritated when Paddy praises Mandy and he ends up telling Paddy, Marlon and Chas about Mandy's findom, revealing that he had posed as her latest customer and exposing Mandy. This was part of Bear's attempt to trap and expose Mandy, as he did not believe that she was being honest when she promised to stop. Paddy is stunned and reveals that he is unsure about whether he will now marry Mandy. The next day at Paddy and Mandy's wedding, Bear is "thrilled" when Paddy says he does not want to marry Mandy, which leads to Marlon and Bear arguing. Mandy is mortified when Bear "sours" her mood by revealing that he was the client and that Paddy now knows about her Findom; Bear also "gleefully" announces that the wedding is off and so Mandy rushes to find Paddy. After a talk with Mandy, Paddy decides to go ahead with the wedding, but they find out that Bear has cancelled all their plans, so they have to have a "makeshift ceremony" and the couple end up getting married.

=== Going missing ===
In May 2025, Emmerdale producer Laura Shaw teased that there would be a "big storyline" for Bear later in the year, with Shaw explaining, "He's going to go off screen for a little while, he's going to go missing. And when he comes back, what you'll see is a very different Bear in a really different situation. We're all going to be watching and going, 'What the hell has happened here?' That's going to be really exciting." It was revealed that Bear would go "missing" as part of the mysterious plot. Ahead of the big storyline, Bear gets a "nasty shock" due to his "unique living situation". Bear struggles living with Mandy and Paddy when Chas' fiancé Liam Cavanagh (Jonny McPherson) moves out as he feels insecure and unwanted and the couple become aware of this and decide to do something about it. When Bear comes home and finds out that Paddy and Mandy have boxed up his belongings, he is horrified and panics that they are trying to rid of him. In reality, they are just moving Bear's belongings into Liam's old room, but an unaware Bear lashes out at his son and daughter-in-law for the second day in a row and flees the house. Paddy and Chas then find Bear looking "downcast" and explain the truth to him, leaving him embarrassed and apologetic. He also tells Paddy that he was worried that he would lose his new-found family.

== Storylines ==
Paddy Kirk (Dominic Brunt) finds out that his mother Barbara Kirk (Judi Jones) had an affair with Bear when she was with the man Paddy thought was his father. Paddy is aware of the fact that he may be Bear's biological son but does not want to face the truth that the man who raised him isn't his father. Paddy and his best friend Marlon Dingle (Mark Charnock) then go to a wrestling convention to meet Bear. When Paddy later finds out that Bear is his father through a DNA test, he travels to Belfast to meet Bear and tells him that he is his son, shocking him. Paddy and Bear bond and say goodbye, but Bear later comes to Emmerdale and moves in with Paddy and his partner Chas Dingle (Lucy Pargeter) and he becomes closer with Paddy. Bear develops a romantic interest in Chas' mother Faith Dingle (Sally Dexter) and the pair have sex but keep it quiet for Paddy and Chas' sake. Bear tells Faith that he is illiterate and insecure about it. Faith later reveals this secret to others to protect her secret kiss with Zak Dingle (Steve Halliwell), which humiliates Bear. Bear becomes jealous when Faith starts seeing Eric Pollard (Chris Chittell) and he tells her the sex of Chas and Paddy's baby in attempt to reconcile, but this strains his relationship with Paddy. Bear briefly moves out, but he reconciles with Paddy after the birth of the baby, Eve Dingle. Chas and Paddy give Eve the middle name "Theodora" when Bear reveals that his real name is "Teddy".

Paddy helps Bear learn to read and Bear becomes friends with Zak and helps Paddy with Eve. Bear is devastated when he finds out that Faith has terminal cancer and tries to support her before her death. During her funeral, he and Zak reminisce about Faith. Bear is furious when he finds out that Chas has been having an affair with Al Chapman (Michael Wildman) and tries to support Paddy. Bear blames Chas when Paddy goes missing and is distraught when he finds out that his son was attempting to kill himself. Bear supports Paddy and joins a men's group where they discuss mental health issues. Bear later moves in with Paddy and Liam Cavanagh (Jonny McPherson) as he cannot stand to be near Chas. Bear gets his beard trimmed by Paddy's ex-wife Mandy Dingle (Lisa Riley) and develops a crush on her and continues getting more beard trims in order to talk to her. When Bear admits his feelings, Mandy rejects him as she is in love with Paddy and she begins another relationship with him, leaving Bear heartbroken. However, Bear gets over his feelings for Mandy and is happy for the couple when they get engaged. Bear starts using a dating app for older people but nothing serious comes it. He then develops a crush on Claudette Anderson (Flo Wilson) and they become friends, though she does not appear to reciprocate the feelings.

Bear is horrified when he finds out that Mandy is working as a financial dominatrix to make money due to her debts. He confronts her and threatens to tell Paddy, and even though she promises to stop, Bear pretends to be a new client of Mandy and exposes what she has been doing. Paddy initially cancels the wedding, pleasing Bear, but in the end Paddy and Mandy get married and Bear makes amends with his new daughter-in-law, saying that he is just protective of Paddy.

== Reception ==
For his role as Bear, Richards was longlisted for "Best Actor" at the 2026 Inside Soap Awards, whilst "Bear's modern slavery nightmare" was longlisted for "Best Storyline" at the same awards.

Prior to Richards' first appearance as the character, David Brown from Radio Times called the revelation that Bear might be Paddy's father "bombshell news" and a "bizarre secret". In 2019, Janine Yaqoob from the Daily Mirror opined that Richards "cut a very strange figure" when he turned up in the village "looking like a stoneage man" and called Bear a "hairy, ageing" wrestler. Yaqoob's colleague, James Brinsford, reported how some viewers were unhappy with Bear's initial "ridiculous" wrestling storyline, with some expressing on Twitter that they found the storyline boring and did not understand many established characters had suddenly become wrestling fans. Brinsford joked, "Whether this is just the end of Paddy's search for his real father remains to be seen but it would seem that viewers sincerely hope it's a dead end as it would be 'too much to bear'". In February 2020, Brinsford's colleague, Charlotte Tutton, reported how viewers were "baffled" when Bear reappeared after not appearing since November 2019, with some viewers previously having wondered if the character had left the soap. Marianna Manson from Heatworld called Bear an "an imposing figure" for Paddy in his first appearance. Johnathon Hughes from Radio Times called Bear a "washed-up wrestler". Simon Timblick from the same website noted how Paddy "gradually become more intrigued" in finding out if Bear was his father. Discussing the storyline where Paddy reads the letters that his mother wrote to Bear due to the character being illiterate, Natalie Corner from the Daily Mirror reported that whilst some viewers praised the storylines, others pointed out the "plot hole" and questioned how Bear was able to reply to the letters and continue his affair with Paddy's mother if he could not read. Calli Kitson from Metro called the scenes where Paddy and Bear fish and talk about Paddy's recovery "moving" and believed that both characters had benefitted from the conversation.

In 2022, Gemma Jones from the Liverpool Echo wrote how some viewers wrote on social media that they did not recognise Bear after he looked "freshly groomed", having a smaller beard and his facer being clearer to see. Jones also called Bear "helpful" and believed that he had a "big burly beard" prior to his "makeover". The following year, Kate Lally from the same website reported how some viewers wrote on social media that Bear was right to tell Chas off for her behaviour in episodes that aired in October 2023, although some other viewers did not share this view. Iona Rowan from Digital Spy called the brief 2023 love triangle between Mandy, Bear and Paddy "incredibly awkward". Olivia Wheeler from the Daily Mirror also called it "awkward" and noted how Bear had not a lot of good luck with women in the village. She also believed that his crush on Claudette was obvious and called the scenes between them at the Christmas fair "sweet". In 2024, Carena Crawford from Emmerdale Insider reported how some viewers believed that Bear had exposed Mandy's Findom in order to sabotage her wedding as he wants Mandy for himself. Crawford believed that Bear's exposure of Mandy was not subtle or sensitive, and asked, "Couldn't have just taken Paddy for a quiet word, eh? Had to do with in front of his ex-wife?". Crawford also opined that Bear took "far too much pleasure" in telling Mandy that the wedding was off. Crawford also reported how some viewers believed that Bear was overreacting over Mandy's sex work and they could not understand why other characters were so horrified as she was not hurting anyone. Justin Harp from Digital Spy opined that Bear was spiteful when he cancelled Mandy and Paddy's wedding plans.

A writer from Inside Soap wrote in 2023 that Bear "burst onto (viewers'] screens" and called the character "larger-than-life" father that had a "mysterious past". Sarah Ellis from the same magazine noted how Bear and Paddy had some "disastrous" initial meetings. Phoebe Tonks from OK! opined that Bear had "has cemented his place in the hearts of viewers" since his debut. She also believed that Bear had a "heart of gold" and wrote, "Whether it was rebuilding his relationship with his estranged son Paddy, or forming a close knit friendship group with Marlon Dingle, Mary Goskirk and even Mandy Dingle, Bear truly delighted audiences with his seamless transition into village life". She also believed that Bear's past was "enigmatic".

In 2025, Kerry Barrett from Emmerdale Insider placed Bear on her list of 11 Emmerdale characters that she believed needed to be used more. Barrett opined that Bear needed "more material", writing, "Bear's great too and we've not seen much of him recently either. We loved his relationship with Faith, but now – like Bob – he seems a bit isolated and forgotten. He needs a friend! Or even a girlfriend!" Helen Daly from Radio Times was "intrigued" by the news that Bear would disappear in a 2025 storyline. Following the announcement of the storyline, Elizabeth Cotton from Manchester Evening News reported how some viewers were worried about Bear's health. Various publications reported how viewers were theorizing that Bear could be feeling or lonely or that he could have a health issue such as cancer or dementia. Jade Brown from Emmerdale Insider put together a list of five theories of what could happen to Bear in the storyline; her theories were that Bear could have dementia or cancer, Bear feeling lonely, Bear having money issues, which could stem from another issue like a gambling problem, or Bear having met someone that he is romantically interested in. Brown noted how viewers had been theorizing over what could be up with the character and that some had written on social media that he looked different. Brown also believed that Bear lashing out at Paddy and Mandy was "out of character" and an "over the top reaction".
