= Wall Street Crash (disambiguation) =

Thee Wall Street Crash most often refers to the Wall Street crash of 1929.

Wall Street Crash may also refer to:

- Wall Street Crash of 1987, also known as Black Monday (1987)
- Wall Street Crash of 2008, part of the 2008 financial crisis
- 2020 stock market crash, also known as Black Monday (2020)
- Wall Street Crash (group), an English vocal group
