= James Graeme =

British actor and singer

James Graeme is a British actor and singer who trained at the Royal Manchester College of Music.

In the West End, Graeme has appeared as the title character in The Phantom of the Opera, created the role of Boone in Whistle Down the Wind, and portrayed Pontius Pilate in Jesus Christ Superstar.

Other theatre credits include Clyde Gabriel in the UK tour of The Witches of Eastwick and George Dillingham in the UK tour of Aspects of Love.

Graeme is a founding member of the singing group Wall Street Crash, with whom he has made many television appearances. He has appeared in a number of concerts, including Something Wonderful, featuring the music of Rodgers and Hammerstein at the Savoy Theatre in London; The Music of Andrew Lloyd Webber in Kyiv; and Another Kind of Magic, featuring the music of Queen, in Estonia, Helsinki, and London.

Graeme appeared as Ernest Hemingway in the widely panned musical Too Close to the Sun at the Comedy Theatre in July 2009. The musical closed two weeks after opening.

In 2011, Graeme starred in the UK tour of Chess playing the role of Walter de Courcey.

Graeme made a one-off appearance in a January 2025 episode of the British soap opera Emmerdale as elderly patient Henry.
