= Shebz Miah =

British actor

- Born: Mohammed Sheblu Miah
- Education: Leeds Beckett University
- Occupation: Actor
- Years active: 2015–present
- Television: Emmerdale

Mohammed Sheblu Miah, known professionally as Shebz Miah, is a British actor. After appearing in various theatre productions, he was cast as Kammy Hadiq in the ITV1 soap opera Emmerdale. For his portrayal of the role, he has been nominated for the British Soap Award for Best Newcomer.

== Life and career ==
Miah grew up in a working class family in Bradford and is of Bangladeshi descent. Miah studied at Leeds Beckett University to become a PE teacher. During his final year, he joined a local acting class. After graduating, he worked day jobs while auditioning for roles. At age 25, he took a mental health course and became a CBT practitioner.

Miah began his acting career going by his birth name, Mohammed Sheblu Miah, before adopting the stage name Shebz Miah. He made his professional acting debut in the 2015 film Welcome 2 Karachi, in a minor role. In 2020, he made his television debut in an episode of the BBC drama series All the Small Things; he continued making minor appearances in various films, television series advertisements and short films until he began making theatre appearances in 2023. His stage debut was in a 2023 production of Punching Down in Bradford.

In 2023, Miah appeared in an episode of the BBC soap opera Doctors. He portrayed Reece Shaw. A year later, he appeared in fellow BBC medical drama Casualty, portraying Noor Din in one episode. Then, in 2025, Miah was cast in the regular role of Kammy Hadiq in the ITV1 soap opera Emmerdale. His first appearance aired on 18 March 2025. Less than two months after his debut, it was announced that he had been nominated for Best Newcomer at the 2025 British Soap Awards.

== Filmography ==
Year	Title	Role	Notes
2015	Welcome 2 Karachi	Journalist	Film
2019	The Believers are But Brothers	Brother	Television film
2020	All the Small Things	Ziyad	Guest role
2021	Sunday	Footballer	Short film
2023	Better	Lad 1	1 episode
2023	Doctors	Reece Shaw	Episode: "Food for Thought"
2024	Casualty	Noor Din	Episode: "Take the Strain"
2025–present	Emmerdale	Kammy Hadiq	Regular role

== Stage ==
Year	Title	Role
2023	Punching Down	Amir
2023	Monk of Mokha	Hamza
2024	Preloved	Kieran
2024	Now/Then	Then
2024	I Blame the Parents	Daniel
2024	Down, Out and on T'Dole	Mark
2024	Brian's Birthwright	Arthur

== Awards and nominations ==
Year	Ceremony	Category	Nominated work	Result	Ref.
2025	British Soap Awards	Best Newcomer	Emmerdale	Nominated	
