= Siobhán McCarthy =

- Born: Siobhán McCarthy; 6 November 1957 (age 68)
- Origin: Dublin, Ireland
- Occupations: Singer, actress
- Years active: 1978–present

Siobhán Mary Ann McCarthy (born 6 November 1957 in Dublin) is an Irish television and stage actress known for her performances in London’s West End.

== Career ==
McCarthy portrays Roisin Connor in ITV1's Prison drama Bad Girls. Her other television credits include Lovejoy, The Big Battalions and Holby City.

McCarthy originated the roles of the Mistress in Evita in 1978 in London's West End, before later returning to the show to play the title role. In between, Siobhan joined the vocal harmony group Wall Street Crash (1980–1983) where she performed several times at London's Talk of the Town, at the Casino in Monte Carlo, and in two Royal Variety Performances (1980 and 1982). She was also the first to play Donna Sheridan in Mamma Mia! in 1999, for which she was nominated for an Olivier Award for Best Actress in a Musical.

She originated the role of Svetlana in the original cast of Chess which premiered in London’s West End. She later took over the role of Florence in the show. Other roles include leads as Mrs. Johnstone in Blood Brothers, Fantine in Les Misérables, Mary Magdalene in Jesus Christ Superstar and Deborah Warner's Medea.

More recently she played the roles of Velma Von Tussle in the London production of Hairspray (February 2010 – March 2010) and Joanne in the Southwark Playhouse revival of Stephen Sondheim's Company.

In 2017, she received a Lucille Lortel Awards Outstanding Lead Actress in a Musical nomination for her performance as Mrs. Lovett in the Off-Broadway revival of Sweeney Todd: The Demon Barber of Fleet Street.

== Personal life ==
She married the theatrical sound designer Andrew Bruce in 1986 and lives in London with her husband and two children.

== Filmography ==
Year	Title	Role	Notes
1992	The Big Battalions	Lizzie Goodhew	Miniseries (5 episodes)
1993	Lovejoy	Carrie	Series 4, Episode 10: "Irish Stew"
1993	All or Nothing at All	Diane	Miniseries (3 episodes)
1993	Horse Opera	Teresa	TV movie
2002	Bad Girls	Roisin Connor	Series 4 (regular role, 13 episodes)
2005	Holby City	Meg Townsend	Series 7, Episode 27: "It's Kinda Rock 'n' Roll"
2010	Law & Order: UK	Governor O'Brien	Series 3, Episode 5, "Survivor"
2011	Holby City	Suzy Kilbride	Series 13, Episode 38: "Out on a Limb" (S13E38)
2017	The Perfect Catch	Customer #1	TV movie
