= Joe Absolom =

English actor (born 1978)

- Born: 16 December 1978 (age 47); Lewisham, London, England
- Occupation: Actor
- Years active: 1991–present
- Spouse: Liz Brown (m. 2019)
- Children: 3

Joe Absolom (born 16 December 1978) is an English actor best known for his roles as Matthew Rose in the BBC soap opera EastEnders (1997–2000), Al Large in the ITV comedy drama Doc Martin (2004–2022) and Ray Walters in Emmerdale (2025–2026).

== Early life ==
Absolom was born in Lewisham, London. A former pupil of Forest Hill School, he made early appearances in the legendary Sun-Pat peanut butter advertisements before making his acting debut with the 1991 film Antonia and Jane.

== Career ==
Absolom joined the BBC soap opera EastEnders in 1997 portraying Matthew Rose. He had few storylines in his first year on the show. The storyline which gained him recognition was the murder of Saskia Duncan, which began in February 1999. His character was framed for the murder by the real culprit, Steve Owen (played by Martin Kemp). After getting revenge on Steve, his character's last appearance aired in February 2000. Absolom won Best Actor at The British Soap Awards that same year.

After leaving EastEnders, Absolom played the leading role in the 2002 British horror film Long Time Dead, and a supporting role in the ITV series Vincent. He became known for his role in Doc Martin playing Bert Large's son, Al.

Absolom guest starred in The Bill between 1992 and 2009 in different roles, and as Benny, a violent loan shark in Casualty. He appeared as a criminal in the internet crime thriller Girl Number Nine, also starring Tracy-Ann Oberman and Gareth David-Lloyd. More recently, he played the part of Ivan in the 2013 horror film 'I Spit on Your Grave 2'. He won a celebrity version of TV show Total Wipeout which aired on 18 September 2010, receiving £10,000 for charity. He played the real life murderer Christopher Halliwell in the drama A Confession in 2019. He starred in the ITV drama The Bay in 2021.

In 2025, Absolom joined the cast of Emmerdale as Ray Walters, a charismatic but dangerous man who is involved in drug-dealing and people trafficking.

=== Radio ===
Absolom is also a radio actor, and has appeared in a BBC Radio 4 Play of the day "Bringing Eddie Home" by John Peacock, based on a true story of the fight by East End couple Edna and Jack Wallace to get their son's body brought home from Aden, and the ensuing fight for the rights of British Service personnel. Absolom played the role of Eddie Wallace and the play also included other ex-EastEnders actors Bill Treacher, Edna Doré, Todd Carty and Tilly Vosburgh.

== Filmography ==
=== Film ===
| Year | Title | Role | Notes |
|---|---|---|---|
| 1991 | Antonia and Jane | Daniel Nash | |
| 2001 | Dream | Tommy | |
| 2002 | Long Time Dead | Rob | |
| 2002 | Extreme Ops | Silo | |
| 2008 | Small Things | Boyd Hilton | Short film |
| 2008 | One of Those Days | Counter Clerk | Short film |
| 2009 | Bottle | Charlie | Short film |
| 2009 | Jubilee | Young Man | Short film |
| 2010 | The Story of __ | Baz | |
| 2012 | Defining Fay | Higgins | Short film |
| 2013 | I Spit on Your Grave 2 | Ivan Patov | |
| 2018 | Neon | Elias | Short film |
| 2020 | The Mermaid of Mevagissey | Pete | Short film |
| 2020 | A Dieu | King Arthur | Short film |
| 2021 | Grave | Dad | Short film |

=== Television ===
| Year | Title | Role | Notes |
|---|---|---|---|
| 1992 | The Bill | Kevin Parsons | 1 episode: Radio Waves |
| 1994 | The Bill | Mick | 1 episode: King of the Hill |
| 1996 | The Tenant of Wildfell Hall | Fergus Markham | 3 part series |
| 1996 | The Bill | Tommy Benning | 1 episode: Toe the Line |
| 1997 | Frighteners | Errand Boy | 1 episode: If You Meet A Fairy |
| 1997 | Silent Witness | Kelvin Price | 1 episode: Friends Like These (Part 1) |
| 1997 | Touching Evil | Craig Jones | 1 episode: 1.5 |
| 1997 | Dangerfield | Alex Dell | 1 episode: Contact |
| 1997–2000 | EastEnders | Matthew Rose | Series regular |
| 2001 | Now You See Her | Lewis | |
| 2002 | Stan the Man | Depp | 6 part series |
| 2003 | Unconditional Love | Benjamin Cain | |
| 2003 | Servants | George Cosmo | 6 part series |
| 2003 | Trevor's World of Sport | Scott | Recurring |
| 2003 | P.O.W. | Drew Pritchcard | 6 part series |
| 2004 | The Long Firm | Tommy | |
| 2004–2022 | Doc Martin | Al Large | Series regular |
| 2005–2006 | Vincent | P.I. Robert | Series regular |
| 2006 | New Tricks | Luke Hanson | 1 episode: Congratulations |
| 2008 | The Bill | Mark Lawrence | 2 episodes: We Are Family (Parts 1 & 2) |
| 2008 | Poirot | James Bentley | 1 episode: Mrs McGinty's Dead |
| 2008 | Casualty | Benny | 2 episodes: This Will Be Our Year and Took A Long Time To Come |
| 2008 | Caught in a Trap | Marcus | |
| 2009 | Personal Affairs | Bob Baxter | 5 part series |
| 2009 | New Tricks | Luke Hanson | 1 episode: The Last Laugh |
| 2009 | Girl Number 9 | Boylan | Internet series |
| 2010 | Ashes to Ashes | Andy Smith | 1 episode |
| 2010 | Total Wipeout | Himself/participant | Celebrity edition |
| 2010 | 71 Degrees North | Himself/participant | |
| 2010 | Thorne: Scaredy Cat | Stuart Nicklin | Three-part series |
| 2012 | Hatfields & McCoys | Selkirk McCoy | Mini-series |
| 2015 | Midsomer Murders | Luke Altman | Episode 17.2 "Murder by Magic" |
| 2015 | Death in Paradise | Aiden Parker | Episode 4.6 |
| 2015 | Suspects | Dean Clarke | Episode 4.2 |
| 2016 | The Level | Shay Nash | |
| 2019 | A Confession | Christopher Halliwell | |
| 2021 | The Bay | Andy Warren | 6 episodes |
| 2025 | Silent Witness | Calvin Ream | 2 episodes "I Believe In Love (Parts 1 & 2)" |
| 2025 | Code of Silence | Braden Moore, "Hulk" | 6 episodes |
| 2025–2026 | Emmerdale | Ray Walters | Regular role |
| 2026 | Corriedale | Ray Walters | Crossover episode between Coronation Street and Emmerdale |

== Awards and nominations ==
| Year | Award | Category | Nominated work | Result |
|---|---|---|---|---|
| 1999 | National Television Awards | Most Popular Actor | EastEnders | Nominated |
| 1999 | TV Quick Awards | Best Soap Actor | EastEnders | Won |
| 2000 | The British Soap Awards | Best Actor | EastEnders | Won |
| 2000 | Variety Club Awards | Outstanding New Talent | —N/a | Won |
| 2010 | Streamy Awards | Best Male Actor in a Drama Web Series | Girl Number 9 | Nominated |
| 2020 | Accolade Global Film Competition | Leading Actor: Merit | A Dieu | Won |
| 2020 | BAFTA TV Awards | Best Supporting Actor | A Confession | Nominated |
