= Paddy Kirk =

Fictional character from Emmerdale

- Emmerdale character
- Portrayed by: Dominic Brunt
- Duration: 1997–present
- First appearance: Episode 2169; 20 February 1997
- Introduced by: Keith Richardson
- Spin-off appearances: The Dingles in Venice (1999); Paddy and Marlon's Big Night In (2011)
In-universe information
- Other names: Paddy Dingle
- Occupation: Veterinary surgeon
- Father: Bear Wolf
- Mother: Barbara Kirk
- Adoptive father: Kenneth Kirk
- Half-brothers: Colin Kirk
- Wife: Mandy Dingle (1999–2001, 2024–present); Emily Dingle (2002–2006); Rhona Goskirk (2012–2017); Chas Dingle (2020–2024)
- Daughters: Grace Dingle; Eve Dingle
- Stepsons: Leo Goskirk; Aaron Dingle; Vinny Dingle (adoptive)
- First cousins: Jason Kirk (adoptive); Ross Kirk (adoptive)

Patrick "Paddy" Kirk (also Dingle) is a fictional character from the British ITV soap opera Emmerdale, played by Dominic Brunt. He has been married five times: to Mandy Dingle (Lisa Riley) in 1999 and 2024, to Emily Dingle (Kate McGregor) in 2002, to Rhona Goskirk (Zoe Henry) in 2012 and to Chas Dingle (Lucy Pargeter) in 2020. He has also had several extramarital affairs since arriving, notably with Viv Hope (Deena Payne) and Tess Harris (Nicola Stephenson). His other storylines in the series have included discovering his biological father and dealing with the loss of his child.

== Casting and characterisation ==
In 2020, Brunt stated that he has had "enough shady jobs to know this is one of the best in the world". He expressed his love and loyalty to working on Emmerdale, but admitted that after 23 years, he still gets nervous and finds certain aspects of the job difficult. Brunt noted that as long as the writers keep giving him good material, he will "keep putting the effort in for them". However, Brunt admitted that he still worries about being written out every December. He explained: "Every Christmas when the contract is up, I still think that's probably it". He explained that this gives him motivation to push himself from an acting perspective, noting that "the thought that at any point [he] could be out" keeps him going. Brunt added that he still feels imposter syndrome working on Emmerdale, despite his 23 years of experience on the soap, but stated that if he was offered another 23 years on the soap, he would "bite their hand off".

On his character profile on the ITV website, Paddy is described as a "loveable softy" that "rarely has a bad word to say about anyone and can usually be relied on". It notes that due to his clumsiness, he can tend to be "the butt of a joke", but since he has a good sense of humour, he rarely takes offence. The profile states that although Paddy makes mistakes, naming hitting a police officer and being suspended from practicing veterinary as examples, he "always works hard at correcting" what he has done wrong. Paddy is billed as a "Loveable, trust-worthy, middle-class" character, and it states he enjoys playing Xbox and dancing to ABBA, and that he dislikes seafood, horses and Vanessa Woodfield (Michelle Hardwick). The profile also notes his strong friendship with Marlon, and reveals that he has a tattoo on his lower back that reads "Marlon Forever", written inside of a heart shape.

== Development ==
=== Daughter's death ===
In 2017, Chas and Paddy rekindled their relationship. The next year, Chas discovers she is pregnant with Paddy's baby. Brunt appeared on This Morning to talk about the storyline, where he stated that the baby would have "a rare defect". He did not detail what specifically the baby would be diagnosed with, but noted that it is "a specific situation that parents find themselves in", and accredited the diagnosis due to the two characters being "parents of a certain age". Scenes aired weeks later confirmed that the baby has bilateral renal agenesis, a condition where kidneys fail to develop in a foetus. Since the condition has no cure, it is established that their baby has no chance of survival. Speaking about his character's response to the diagnosis, Brunt explains that Paddy initially wants to stop the suffering immediately, and suggests an abortion to Chas. Chas informs him that some couples who learn of the diagnosis decide to have the baby, to spend whatever time they can with the baby post-birth, and Paddy agrees with her. Brunt explained: "They decide that they're having the child and that nobody is allowed to see them as victims. They decide to be positive for the baby and themselves. There will be difficulties and heartbreaking periods, but they decide this is what they're going to do and they're going to approach it in a positive way." Brunt also commended the producers for telling the story, and voiced his excitement to be involved in it. He stated that he is "over the moon" to be involved due to it being an "interesting" and "utterly fascinating" topic, but noted that he was thankful that he was not going through it in real life. He added that he hopes to do the storyline justice.

Months later, the two characters were allotted a standalone episode where they "say a heartbreaking farewell to their newborn daughter", whom they named Grace. In another interview with This Morning, Brunt praised the writing team for the script. He explained that they had not exploited the topic for drama, but that they approached the episode "really delicately". The episode explores Grace's potential future with "flashforward fantasy scenes" showing her at certain ages, acted out through Chas and Paddy's imaginations. Brunt added: "It's not as depressing as it sounds. It's full of hope." Digital Spy described the episode as "groundbreaking", but Brunt stated that he would not care if the storyline did not win an award. He explained that in his 21 years at Emmerdale, he has never won an award, so it is not important to him. Brunt confirmed that he knew the outcome of the birth, but that he did not know anything past this point. He stated that he likes to be surprised each time he receives a script, and that he became excited to film the aftermath of the birth, since it was a surprise to him. He added that he did not know if Chas and Paddy would stay together, and that both of them are "set to struggle in their own ways for a while" due to the emotional impact of their loss. When asked if he would want them to stay together, he opined that the drama of them not living "happily ever after" would be good to watch, but that eventually, he would want them to stay together.

=== Pregnancy and relationship with Chas ===
In March 2019, it was announced that Chas would discover she is pregnant again. The couple decide not to know the sex of the baby, and leave the scan photo at Grace's grave. It is discovered by Paddy's father Bear, who reveals to Chas' mother Faith Dingle (Sally Dexter) that they are having a boy. However, Chas gives birth to a girl, Eve, and the mistake is explained when Bear reveals that he cannot read. When Paddy takes Marlon to the hospital, he accidentally leaves Eve in the backseat, unattended and with the car door open. Brunt explains that his character's reaction to the situation is that "all Paddy can think of is getting Marlon to the hospital", since he is worried about Marlon's health. He later realises he has left his daughter, and has a "blind panic". Eve is not in the car when he gets back to it, and Brunt called upon his own experiences as a parent, stating it "must be one of the worst things ever". Although Eve is found safe, social services get involved and Chas begins to "thinks of Paddy" differently, especially since they lost Grace. Brunt adds that Paddy is "pretty heavy on himself", and confirmed that his guilt would be explored further.

Bear informs Paddy of Chas' "potential unfaithfulness", to which Brunt claims Paddy is "in complete denial". He explained his character's mindset of not believing Bear by stating that Paddy thinks: "No, I'm not going to follow them up there, we're adults and she should never do that". However, when he overhears Chas telling Al Chapman (Michael Wildman) that they should "spend some time together somewhere like a pub or a hotel", he is "utterly devastated". Paddy and Chas then navigate through their problems with a break from each other, but in December 2020, Paddy makes the last-minute decision to surprise Chas with a wedding on Christmas Day. Brunt suggests that Paddy has "bitten off more than he can chew", leading him to ask for help from the villagers. He opined that the wedding episode is "very sweet and romantic", but admitted that his character is "an idiot", and that "he's not really thought it through". Asked why his character would plan a last-minute Christmas wedding, Brunt joked that Paddy is "insane". He goes on to explain that "the best present" Paddy feels he can give to Chas after "two really bad years for them", referring to the loss of Grace and their relationship problems, is a wedding. He stated: "He just loves her and wants to give her the best present he possibly can after the worst time they've both been through." Brunt also expressed his excitement at being "at the centre" of the festive episodes, since it is a big deal to him. He billed it "an iconic episode" which he felt lucky to be part of.

== Storylines ==
Paddy comes to Emmerdale as a locum for Zoe Tate (Leah Bracknell). He is drawn to Mandy Dingle (Lisa Riley) and they begin a rocky relationship. Paddy's mother, Barbara (Judi Jones), disapproves of Mandy, and offers her money to marry someone else. Needing money to stop her family from being evicted, Mandy takes it and marries her cousin, Butch (Paul Loughran), leaving Paddy depressed. After a bad date with Bernice Blackstock (Samantha Giles), Paddy proposes to Mandy and she accepts. They marry the following year but over the next two years, Mandy is frequently absent as her father, Caleb (Mike Kelly), is ill. She misses Paddy but begins an affair with her father's carer and their marriage breaks down. A heartbroken Paddy becomes close to Emily Kirk (Kate McGregor). They begin dating and later get engaged. On the day that Marlon (Mark Charnock) and Tricia Stokes (Sheree Murphy) were supposed to marry, Tricia gets cold feet, so Emily and Paddy get married instead. They become foster parents, looking after several children including Debbie Dingle (Charley Webb) but over time, the marriage becomes stale. Paddy tells Emily about his affair with Viv Windsor (Deena Payne), and he is punched by Viv's estranged husband, Bob Hope (Antony Audenshaw) and Zak Dingle (Steve Halliwell). Soon after, Emily leaves the village with Debbie's young daughter, Sarah.

Paddy begins a relationship with Chas Dingle (Lucy Pargeter) and deals with her wayward son, Aaron Livesy (Danny Miller). The problems aren't helped by Carl King (Tom Lister), who informs Paddy that he and Chas had sex. Paddy initially refuses to believe it, but realises it is true and evicts Chas. He allows Aaron to stay, and the two grow closer and Paddy acts as a father to Aaron. Paddy realises that Aaron is gay, but unable to accept his own sexuality, Aaron viciously beats him. He is immediately remorseful, and the two have a long talk where he admits that he is gay. When Rhona Goskirk (Zoe Henry) returns to the village, she and Marlon reignite their relationship, but Rhona falls in love with Paddy. She later learns she is pregnant with Marlon's baby, but regardless, Paddy and Rhona begin a relationship and later get married. Their marriage is tested after Rhona becomes addicted to painkillers. Marlon invites Paddy to a night out and meets a woman named Tess Harris (Nicola Stephenson). They have sex in her car. Tess turns out to be the married teaching assistant of Leo, Rhona's son. They break it off, but resume things after a short while. Rhona suggests to Paddy that they adopt a child and Paddy eventually agrees. Amongst others, Aaron and Tess are asked to be references for the social worker. After Tess gives her reference, she texts Paddy but Rhona finds the phone and asks why he has a second phone, Paddy says that it's Aaron's and consequently tells him about the affair. Reeling, Aaron tells the social worker that Paddy and Rhona are having marital issues. They later decide to end their marriage.

Paddy and Chas rekindle their relationship, and Chas learns that she is pregnant. They are excited to have a baby, but they discover that their child has bilateral renal agenesis and will not survive long after birth. Despite this, they agree to continue with the pregnancy. They make plans to marry, but Chas tells Paddy that she doesn't want to marry him just yet. Chas goes into labour, and gives birth to their daughter Grace who lives an hour. During their time together, Paddy imagines the life he and Chas would have had with their daughter. Chas and Paddy later learn that they are pregnant again. Paddy's ex-wife Mandy returns to the village with her teenage son Vinny (Bradley Johnson) for Marlon's surprise wedding to Jessie Grant (Sandra Marvin). Chas initially suspects that Paddy is Vinny's father, but Mandy explains that he is not. She gives Chas and Marlon a letter for Paddy originally from his mother to pro wrestler Bear Wolf (Joshua Richards), explaining that Bear is Paddy's biological father. Paddy tries to ignore the revelation, but he eventually meets Bear at a convention in Belfast. Bear later arrives in the village, and Paddy and Chas allow him to stay with them. He and Paddy begin to form a relationship. Chas goes into labour, and the baby is revealed to be a girl, Eve (Bonnie and Billy Clement). Paddy and Chas marry on Christmas 2020, with Paddy taking Chas's surname.

Paddy had some of his relatives/friends abused by Ray Walters. Those being Dylan Penders and Bear Wolf. Paddy, Dylan and Bear had a difficult time after Ray was attacking Paddy and Dylan but then Bear came in and strangled Ray, leading to his death. All 3 kept quiet as they did not want the police to find out. Before Bear walked in on Ray, Dylan & Paddy, all 3 of them actually thought that Bear had been killed. Eventually, when Bear was speaking to a councillor on the 13th of February, 2026 where he told her that he killed Ray and then Bear called the police himself. Paddy, Dylan & Bear keep a lie to the police to pretend that Bear was the only one there during the killing of Ray Walters. On the 17th of March, 2026, Paddy and Dylan came clean to the police after Bear's lying lead to him saying that it was murder. On the 19th of March, 2026, Dylan actually sent a letter to the police, saying that he was the one who killed Ray and then he ran away, he was found by Graham Foster the next day. As of the 28th of March, 2026, the storyline is still going on.

== Reception ==
At the 1999 British Soap Awards, Brunt was nominated for Best On-Screen Partnership at the British Soap Awards, alongside Riley (Mandy). He was nominated for the award again in 2009 with Charnock, who portrays the role of best friend Marlon. As well as receiving nominations for Best Comedy Performance in 2009, 2010 and 2013, he was nominated in the category of Best Actor at the 2011 British Soap Awards. In August 2017, Brunt was longlisted for Funniest Male at the Inside Soap Awards. He later made the viewer-voted shortlist. On 6 November 2017, Brunt won the "Funniest Male" accolade. At the 2019 British Soap Awards, Brunt was nominated for three awards. He received a longlist nomination for Best Actor, and shortlist nominations for Best Male Dramatic Performance and Best On-Screen Partnership, the latter with Pargeter (Chas).

In an interview with the Daily Mirror, Brunt revealed that he often receives "sex letters" from older viewers of the soap. He accredited this due to Paddy being "very safe and kind", leading people to "project [their] sexual fantasies on to him". He commented: "I'd get sex letters from 60-year-olds, saying, 'I've had rumblings I've not had for 30 years' and telling me what they want to do to me. It's hilarious."
