= Bradley Riches =

English actor (born 2001)

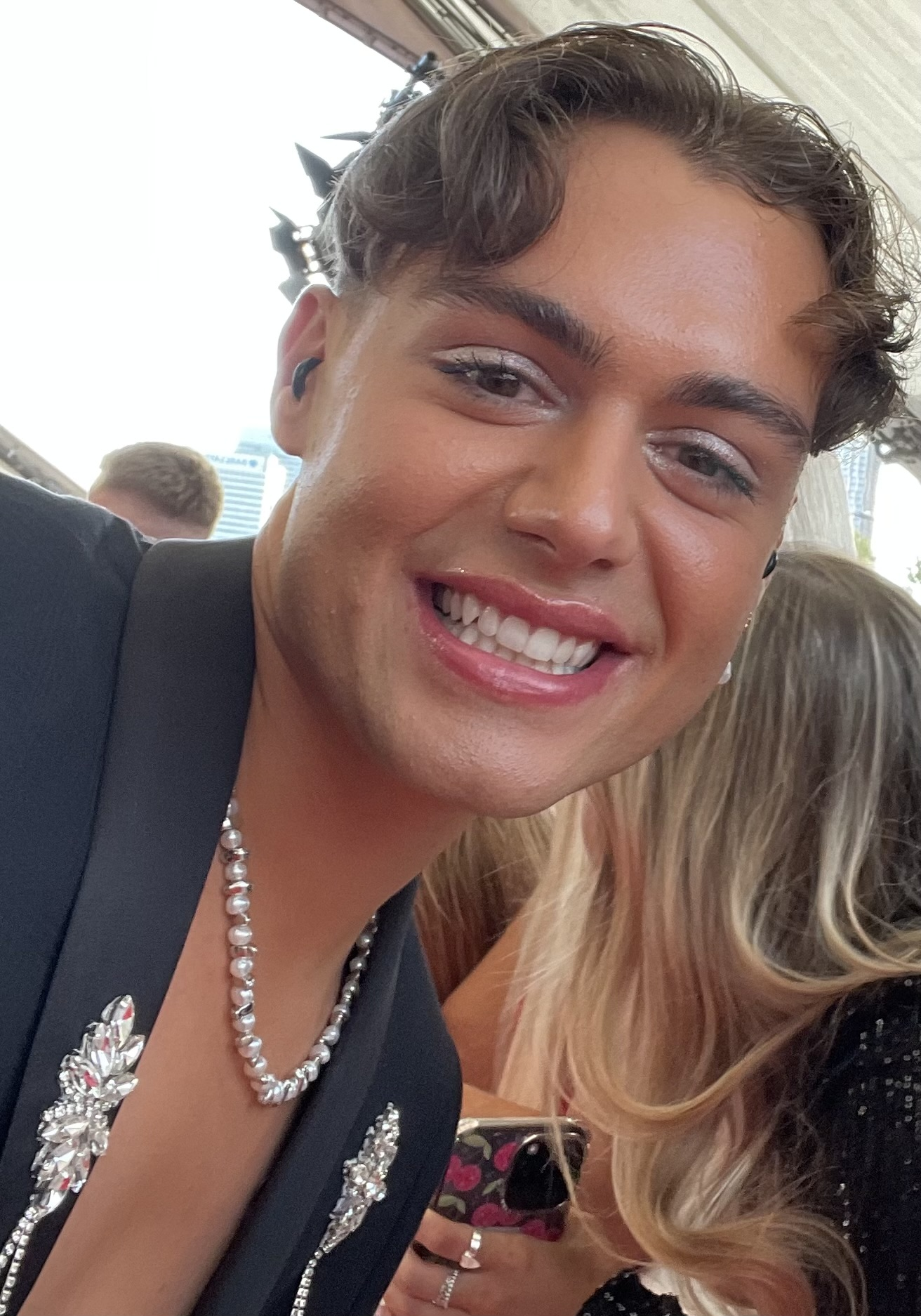
- Riches in 2024
- Born: Bradley Stephen Riches; 11 December 2001 (age 24); Surrey, England
- Other name: Mr Bradstein
- Education: Emil Dale Academy (BA)
- Occupations: Actor; writer
- Years active: 2016–present
- Spouse: Scott Johnston (m. 2026)

Bradley Stephen Riches (born 11 December 2001) is an English actor and writer. After appearing in various stage productions, he was cast as James McEwan on the Netflix series Heartstopper in 2022. Riches then appeared as a housemate on the twenty-third series of Celebrity Big Brother in 2024 and has since joined the cast of the ITV1 soap opera Emmerdale as Lewis Barton. Riches is also a Sunday times bestselling author with his book Autistically Me and has also released another book about his experience growing up with autism.

== Early life and education ==
Bradley Stephen Riches was born on 11 December 2001 in Surrey, England. He was diagnosed as autistic at the age of 9 and was also nonverbal until he was 10. Shortly after, he began attending a drama group after which he said he "found [he] had this voice" and became more confident in communicating with people. He began his theatre training at The British Theatre Academy. Riches went on to graduate from Emil Dale Academy with a Bachelor of Arts (BA) in Musical Theatre, awarded by the University of Bedfordshire. He wrote his dissertation on the challenges for neurodivergent performers.

== Career ==
Riches made his stage debut in 2016, appearing as twins Ben and Lisa in the musical Disaster!. He went on to appear in various other stage productions including Goodnight Mister Tom, Monstersongs, A Christmas Story: The Musical, Footloose and Kin the Musical. He also had a minor role as a soldier in the film 1917. In April 2022, Riches portrayed a student at Truham Grammar School in the Netflix teen series Heartstopper. His character was later established in the second series as James McEwan, who has a crush on Isaac Henderson (Tobie Donovan).

In November 2023, Riches released his debut book, "A" Different Kind Of Superpower. It is a semi-autobiographical children's book that recalls Riches' autism diagnosis as a nine-year-[...] and reframes neurodivergence in all its forms as a superpower". Riches said he wanted to "expand on [his] story so that as many people as possible could find themselves in some part of the character's journey". In March 2024, Riches was a housemate on Celebrity Big Brother in its twenty-third series finishing 6th with 1.6% of the final vote after a surprise back door eviction Later in the year, he appeared in the BBC One comedy horror series Wreck as Freddie.

In December 2024, Riches made his pantomime debut at the Aylesbury Waterside Theatre in Buckinghamshire in The Further Adventures of Peter Pan: The Return of Captain Hook. In March 2025, it was announced that Riches would be joining the cast of ITV soap opera Emmerdale as Lewis Barton, a regular character and addition to the established Barton family. In 2026, he released his second book, Autistically Me.

== Personal life ==
Riches is gay and said that "as a gay person with autism, he 'found it hard to navigate' a world that is 'fit for neurotypical people'". In April 2024, he became engaged to theatre director Scott Johnston. They got married on 8 April 2026.

== Filmography ==
Year	Title	Role	Notes	Ref.
2019	1917	Soldier	Minor role	
2022–2024	Heartstopper	James McEwan	Guest (series 1); Main (series 2); Recurring (series 3)	
2024	Celebrity Big Brother	Himself	Housemate; series 23	
2024	Wreck	Freddie	Main role	
2025–present	Emmerdale	Lewis Barton	Regular role	
2026	Heartstopper Forever	James McEwan	Supporting role (Television film)	

== Stage ==
Year	Title	Role	Venue	Ref(s)
2016	Disaster!	Ben/Lisa	Charing Cross Theatre	
2018	Goodnight Mister Tom	Sammy	Southwark Playhouse	
2018	Monstersongs	Child/Dragon	The Other Palace	
2018	A Christmas Story: The Musical	Farkus/Elf/Swing	Waterloo East Theatre	
2019	Footloose	Willard Hewitt	Southwark Playhouse	
2022	Kin the Musical	Ensemble/Cover	The Other Palace	
2024	Babies	Toby	The Other Palace	
2024–2025	The Further Adventures of Peter Pan: The Return of Captain Hook	Peter Pan	Aylesbury Waterside Theatre	

== Bibliography ==
- "A" Different Kind Of Superpower (2023)
- Autistically Me (2026)
