= Financial domination =

Fetish lifestyle involving transfer of money

Financial domination (also known as findom) is a fetish lifestyle in which a financial submissive gifts objects or money to a financial dominant.

== Overview ==
Text screenshot of a man sending money to his domme

In the financial domination lifestyle, in particular a practice of dominance and submission, a financial submissive (cash piggy, finsub, human ATM, money slave or paypig) gives gifts and money to a financial dominant (findomme/findom, Goddess, money dom/money domme, money master/money mistress or cashmaster). Participants in financial domination can be of any gender, but in the financial domination practice, the receiver (also called dominant) is typically a woman, and the submissive is almost always a man. Financial domination became more widespread and took on its current form after the introduction of the Internet. The relationship between the two parties—the dominant, or receiver; and submissive, or the giver—often takes place solely via online communication. Financial dominants often present themselves on their own websites, relevant web portals or social networks to attract the patronage of the submissive.

In the majority of cases, the two (submissive and dominant) never meet, since findom is primarily a form of "distance domination". In rare exceptions, the submissive may accompany the dominant while the dominant shops with the submissive's money. Financial domination is in some cases combined with other BDSM practices. Such a relationship between individuals may be similar to, yet clearly distinguishable from, relationships based on total power exchange. In the latter, the submissive may grant all their money saved and earned to the dominant in addition to many other aspects of their autonomy; however, it is not uncommon for both partners to have an intimate relationship as well, contrary to the financial domination dynamic. Financial domination can also be distinguished from sugar baby relationships in which a sugar daddy/mama offers gifts and money to the "baby" in return for a relationship, generally without any explicit elements of domination. In financial domination, the submissive has no expectation of sexual contact in return for the money, and often there is no physical contact of any kind between the two parties.

One element of financial domination is the financial dominant/benefactor oppressing the submissive and establishing superiority over the submissive. Many members of the findom scene are matriarchists who claim that women are superior to men.

Submissive members of the community tend to be seen as rich from people outside of the community, but most tend to be people in the lower-middle class.

== Reception ==
Since 2013, numerous articles about financial domination have appeared in popular print media and online magazines. Some of them are just reports; others subject the phenomenon to a critical examination. Some of these authors question whether financial domination is actually a sexual preference. The majority of submissives have low self-esteem due to the dominant's partial or full control over their decisions. They are insecure in dealing with women. The first contact with a dominant typically comes about purely by chance, for example when surfing on BDSM sites or when looking for financial services (by using search terms as financial or money). Over time, paying becomes an addiction for many, which in the worst case can lead to financial ruin. This in turn has three reasons: the ready availability of financial domination over the Internet; the targeted manipulation by dominants (many of them are not aware of their great responsibility); and the fact that psychological dependence is wanted by both sides and is even essential for financial domination.

Other authors do not consider money slavery to be pathological and see it as an inclination that one can live out responsibly. However, some point to the high risk of deception and fraud. With many moneydom accounts (for example, on Twitter), it is unclear who is really behind it. There are proven cases of fraud. In addition, many women become money mistresses for purely financial reasons, without having any relation to dominance. Both are subsumed under the term fake in the findom scene. However, some submissives are said to accept the deception or even to be aroused by it.

Scientific papers about findom were published in 2007 and 2021. For both, relevant websites and social media accounts were observed over a period of several years (see Netnography). In addition to questions regarding self-justification and dealing with social rejection, both articles deal with the general characterization of money slavery. On the whole, the picture drawn in the popular media is confirmed and three things are also highlighted. First, the Internet has fundamentally changed the market for sexual services. Those involved could communicate more easily and, above all, anonymously, and real encounters are no longer necessary in many practices. Second, digital networks offer new (and vastly better) ways for people with dissenting inclinations or views to share, connect, and develop identities as a group. Third, anyone can create an artificial identity on the Internet that has little or nothing to do with the real person. All three of these factors were prerequisites for the emergence of the findom scene. According to the author of the first study, this is a postmodern phenomenon. The authors of the second article compare the appearances of moneydoms with those of influencers.

== See also ==
- Dominatrix
- Erotic hypnosis
- Erotic sexual denial
- Maledom
