= Wall Street Crash (group) =

English vocal group

- Origin: London, England
- Genres: Pop, swing, jazz
- Years active: 1980–2007
- Labels: Magnet, Mercury
- Past members: see Members

Wall Street Crash were an English vocal group, formed in March 1980 by Keith Strachan. Performing music from the 1920s to the 1980s, they appeared regularly on British television and in three Royal Variety Performances.

== History ==
Keith Strachan had been the musical director of the TV production of Oh Boy, and formed the group in early 1980 from members of the cast. Peter Olsen joined six weeks later. The group made their live debut in March 1980 at the Country Cousin in King's Road, London. They were spotted by Gerry Maxim of MAM at a trade show, and he arranged for them to make their television debut on Saturday Night at the Mill.

In April 1981 the group had their own television show on BBC2, and in June 1981, a television special, The Music of Wall Street Crash, was broadcast on BBC1. The group's debut self-titled album was released in 1982. European Affair followed in 1983, which included original material. Their version of the song "You Don't Have to Say You Love Me" reached number 8 in Italy in 1983. Also in 1983, the group won 'Group of the Year' at Club Mirror's Club Acts of the Year Awards' Karen Page joined in November 1984. Sheen Doran, a former Tiller Girl and founding member of Toto Coelo, was a member from 1984 until 1985 when she was forced to stop singing due to illness.

They performed in three Royal Variety Shows, the first in 1980, and appeared on many TV programmes in the 1980s, including The Morecambe and Wise Show and 3-2-1.

The group has been through a few changes in line-up, but some were still performing as late as 2005.

Former members include Siobhan McCarthy who went on to play Evita and star in the original cast of Mamma Mia! and also Louis Hoover, who later played Frank Sinatra in the stage production Frank, Sammy and Dean – The Rat Pack.

== Members ==
- Mary Dunne (1980–?)
- Jean Rich (1980–?)
- Sharron Skelton (1980–?)
- Paul Felber (1980–?)
- James Graeme (1980–1987)
- Colin Copperfield (1980–?)
- Shaun Harris (1980–?)
- Ricky Piper (1980–?)
- Val Mitchell (1980–1980)
- Cori Josias (1980–1981)
- Siobhan McCarthy (1980–1983)
- Peter Olsen (1980–1987)
- Maria Morgan (1983–1984)
- Sheen Doran (1984–1885)
- Karen Page (1984–1987)
- Stephen (Steve) Pert (1987–?)
- Stephen Sparling (Louis Hoover) (1987–1989)
- Lois McLeod (1987–1989)
- Dawn Knight (1989–1991)
- Mandy Franklin (1991–?)

== Discography ==
=== Albums ===
- Wall Street Crash (1982), Magnet
- European Affair (1983), Magnet
- Wall Street Crash (1983), Magnet – Italian album
- No Strings Attached (1988), Mercury
- Do Wop Café (1990), Dino Music
- Be There – Live in Holland (1992), Mercury

Compilations

- You Don’t Have To Say You Love Me (1983), Young
- The Wall Street Crash Story (1987), Magney/Ariola

=== Singles ===
- "Swing, Swing, Swing" (1982), Magnet
- "Hey You" (1982), Magnet
- "Life on Mars" (1982), Magnet
- "La Banda" (1983), Magnet
- "You Don't Have to Say You Love Me" (1983), Magnet
- "You're My World" (1983), Magnet
- "Susie's Bar", Magnet
- "Musicman" (1986), Philips
- "Dancin'"/"Too Shy" (1988), Mercury
- "Hold on to Love" (1988), Mercury
- "Two Hearts" (1989), Mercury
- "Call a Reporter" (1989), Mercury
- "Do Wop Cafe" (1990), Dino Music
- "Only a Step Away" (1992), Mercury
