= Matthew Rose (EastEnders) =

Fictional character from the BBC soap opera EastEnders

- EastEnders character
- Portrayed by: Joe Absolom
- Duration: 1997–2000
- First appearance: Episode 1494; 26 August 1997
- Last appearance: Episode 1903; 3 February 2000
- Spin-off appearances: Pudding Lane (1999)
In-universe information
- Occupation: Market trader DJ
- Father: Michael Rose
- Mother: Susan Rose
- Grandmothers: Mrs Rose
- Uncles: Colin Rose; Brian

Matthew Rose is a fictional character from the BBC soap opera EastEnders, played by Joe Absolom from 26 August 1997 to 3 February 2000. He was introduced in 1997. In a deviation from typical casting protocol, the role of Matthew was constructed for Absolom after he auditioned for the production team; they were looking for new, raw talent and developed the character after they saw him perform. Matthew's most prominent storyline surrounded him being framed for murder and his wrongful imprisonment. The storyline captivated public interest with various newspapers starting nationwide campaigns for the character's release. Absolom decided to leave the soap, believing that the storyline could not be advanced further or bettered. He made his final appearance in February 2000 after taking revenge on his employer Steve Owen (Martin Kemp), the man who framed him for killing his old girlfriend Saskia Duncan (Deborah Sheridan-Taylor) on Valentine's Day 1999. Matthew was not killed off and producers suggested that the door had been left open for a possible return.

== Creation and development ==
Absolom was asked to attend an audition for EastEnders by the producers at the time in 1997, despite there being no set part available at the time. He commented, "I got a telephone call out of the blue asking me whether I would like to go in and see them. They didn't have a role for me but were looking for new faces and were keen for me to come on board." According to Absolom the producers were looking for someone who was "new, raw, unaffected". Absolom was initially uncertain about taking the role: "I really had to think long and hard about it. Once you take on something like this, it really does change your life. After I'd auditioned, they told me to go away and think things through. My parents said it was only me who could decide and my younger sister was no help. She tried to put me off. She said "don't do it Joe, 'cos we'll have all the fans parked outside our house." However he accepted the role and made his first appearance on-screen in August 1997 as the son of already established character Michael Rose (Russell Floyd).

Matthew's most prominent storyline spans a year and begins on the Valentine's Day episode in February 1999. After developing a friendship with club owner Steve Owen (Martin Kemp), Matthew is present to witness Steve accidentally killing his ex-girlfriend Saskia Duncan (Deborah Sheridan-Taylor) by hitting her on the head with a marbel ashtray following her jealous attack on him. Saskia's death was first screened in a lengthened 45-minute episode on a Sunday evening, deviating from EastEnders' typical broadcasting weekday slots. Executive producer Matthew Robinson has alleged that Saskia's death scene had to be reshot because it was deemed too violent: "When we played back the film, it was fantastic – too fantastic. It looked so real that I knew we couldn't broadcast it. EastEnders goes out before the nine o'clock watershed, children watch it – and we can't show outright scenes of graphic violence. We had to do the whole thing again. It took almost two hours and the three actors were emotionally and physically exhausted. In the end we got what we wanted." After the killing, Steve fears that police will not believe it was an accident, convinces Matthew to help him cover-up the death and they bundle Saskia's body into a bin liner and bury it in a wood. Robinson said, "This is an exciting plot and it'll keep us occupied for much of the next year."

The storyline advances throughout 1999 with a police investigation, the discovery of Saskia's body and Steve framing Matthew. In episodes that first aired in October 1999, a court trial is screened, with both Matthew and Steve on trial for manslaughter. Throughout the court scenes different verdicts are insinuated as evidence swings to and fro against the two accused. The eventual verdict ends in a miscarriage of justice; Steve is exhonerated and Matthew is found guilty of manslaughter and imprisoned. A spokeswoman for EastEnders said at the time: "We are expecting a huge public reaction over the storyline. Joe has already been sent T-shirts by two viewers that say 'Free Matt'."

Absolom announced he was quitting the role in October 1999. Absolom stated that he had enjoyed his time on the soap but believed it was the right time to move on, suggesting that the storyline airing at the time, his wrongful imprisonment for murder, would have been difficult to advance. He commented, "I think people are getting quite bored of it. I've cried so many times on telly, that people just go, `he's crying again', it's not like anything new now." Absolom remained on-screen until February 2000. Executive producer of EastEnders, Matthew Robinson, said of the actor, "Joe Absolom has made a huge contribution to EastEnders, culminating in the huge success of the recent trial and verdict storylines" and he added that the door would be left open for a future return. Absolom commented in 2000, "I've been told the door is always open for me, so you never know. Also, I hope to still see some of the cast, so I like to think it won't be my last visit."

Matthew's final episode is a showdown of revenge against his enemy Steve Owen, the real culprit of the murder Matthew was framed for. Absolom described the episode as tough and intense. Two versions of the episode were filmed after the BBC decided that the initial version was too violent. In the broadcast version, Matthew holds Steve hostage at gunpoint and terrorises him with mind games, threatening to kill him and forcing Steve to beg for his life. Finally, Matthew empties a petrol can and pulls out a lighter, but in a final twist he reveals that the can is only filled with water." After humiliating Steve, Matthew departs. Of his leaving storyline, Absolom said, "I wanted it to be a totally blow-your-mind storyline. This is why I knew it was the right time to move on. I really felt I couldn't top recent scenes and wanted to go out on a high and be remembered for work that I'm proud of."

== Storylines ==
When Matthew arrives in August 1997, he starts out as a sulky teenager. His father, Michael Rose (Russell Floyd), is a market inspector in Albert Square and his mother, Susan Rose (Tilly Vosburgh), arrives later. She and Michael are divorced but he and Matthew take care of her because she has multiple sclerosis. Matthew eventually starts his own market stall, selling CDs. In early 1998, he gets engaged to Sarah Hills (Daniela Denby-Ashe) so he can have sex with her and later breaks off the engagement. He also has a brief relationship with Mary Flaherty (Melanie Clark Pullen). In 1999, Matthew starts working as a DJ for new e20 club owner Steve Owen (Martin Kemp). Steve Owen's past soon catches up with him when his obsessive ex-girlfriend Saskia Duncan (Deborah Sheridan-Taylor) arrives in the Square and starts stalking him. Steve gets Matthew involved and tells him to keep an eye out for Saskia and not let her into the club.

Saskia's murder

On 14 February 1999, Saskia sneaks into Steve's office and tries to strangle him with his tie, angry because he had dumped her. Matthew comes in and tries to pull Saskia away but she pushes him away and continues strangling Steve. Steve reaches for the nearest object, an ashtray, and hits her over the head and she is killed instantly from the brutal blow. Matthew witnesses it and tries to run away from the scene but Steve threatens him and tells him he is already involved and can't run now or he will go to prison too. Steve and Matthew dump Saskia's body in Epping Forest. Matthew is worried someone will find out about Saskia but Steve assures him nothing will happen. Over the next few months, Matthew continues to be paranoid and is worried he will go to prison for Saskia's murder. Unknown to Steve, he keeps the CCTV tape showing Saskia's attack on Steve and subsequent death, but does not dare destroy it. When his flat is burgled and the rucksack in which he has hidden the tape is stolen, his fear and paranoia are heightened. Steve tries to keep him in control. The tape is subsequently recovered but useless as it was wiped by the magnetic field of the stereo speaker Matthew had hidden it in.

In June 1999, Saskia's body is discovered and Matthew tries running away from Walford with girlfriend Teresa di Marco (Leila Birch). He and Teresa go to Nottingham to hide, using Steve's credit card to pay their expenses. He plans to go to Italy from there. Steve is hot on their trail and finds them in a hotel. Matthew and Teresa manage to escape but Matthew is arrested on the way to the airport because Steve has told the police Matthew had killed Saskia. Steve is arrested too for helping to dispose of Saskia's body. Matthew finds life tough in prison but his cellmate toughens him up and tells him he must never be scared of anyone. At the trial in October 1999, Matthew pleads not guilty. Steve, meanwhile, puts up an act and tells lies about how Matthew was obsessed with Saskia and killed her. In a cruel twist of fate, Matthew is found guilty of Saskia's manslaughter, and Steve walks away. Matthew's dad, Michael, shouts in court, "He's innocent, my son is innocent!" Matthew is released from prison in December 1999 after the police find the ashtray with Steve's fingerprints on, and he plans revenge on Steve. During January 2000, he stalks Steve – trashing his flat, blocking the toilets in his e20 club and spraying graffiti on his door saying, "DEAD MAN WALKING". Steve tries investigating who is responsible and hires a detective to find out. The detective is unable to find out if Matthew is doing all this.

On 3 February 2000, Matthew finally confronts Steve. He comes for a final showdown with Steve in the club where it all began with Saskia's murder a year earlier. Matthew reveals that he has been in the Square for weeks and that the detective Steve had hired was useless. He demanded £10,000 but Steve tries to bully him and throw him out but Matthew shows him a video of him planting light bulbs in Steve's flat. He makes Steve realise that if his sister, Jackie Owen (Race Davies), arrives home and turns on the lights they will explode. Steve isn't buying it and taunts Matthew about how stupid he is and that is what got him into prison. He pulls a gun on Matthew to try to scare him off. Matthew is one step ahead and had the gun emptied beforehand. Steve is shocked and after a struggle, Matthew hits him with a glass bottle, knocking him unconscious. He ties Steve to a chair and threatens to set the club on fire. Steve is reduced to a helpless and emotional wreck, which is what Matthew wants. He reveals that the video was fake and the petrol he used to threaten Steve is actually water. He gets his revenge, which is to see Steve beg for mercy. He leaves the Square for good and is not seen again. When Steve dies in a car crash two years later, flowers from Matthew saying "Dear Steve, rot in hell" are left on his grave.

== Reception ==
Absolom was touted as one of the BBC's rising stars due to his stint in EastEnders. Viewers were reportedly shocked and angered when the character was wrongly imprisoned for murder in 1999. Several newspapers began a campaign to free Matthew, who was dubbed the Walford One by the popular press. During Matthew's time in prison, Absolom received what he described as zany fanmail such as chocolate "from people who thought it would sustain me in jail" and an audio-taped copy of the episode in which Saskia was murdered by Steve "So I could show it to the police and clear my name".

Absolom was nominated in the 'Most Popular Actor' category at the 1999 National Television Awards for his performance as Matthew. In 1998 he won 'Best Soap Actor' award at the TV Quick awards. In 2000, Absolom was awarded 'Best Actor' at the British Soap Awards.
