= Amy Wyatt =

Fictional character from Emmerdale

- Emmerdale character
- Natalie Ann Jamieson as Amy Wyatt
- Portrayed by: Chelsea Halfpenny (2010–2013); Natalie Ann Jamieson (2019–2025)
- Duration: 2010–2013, 2019–2025
- First appearance: 8 October 2010
- Last appearance: 20 February 2025
- Introduced by: Steve Frost (2010); Jane Hudson (2019)
- Chelsea Halfpenny as Amy Wyatt
In-universe information
- Occupation: B&B assistant Shop assistant
- Father: Tony
- Mother: Kerry Wyatt
- Adoptive father: Eric Pollard (foster)
- Adoptive mother: Val Pollard
- Sisters: Chloe Harris
- Husband: Matty Barton (2024–2025)
- Sons: Kyle Dingle
- Nephews: Reuben Harris

Amy Barton (also Wyatt) is a fictional character from the British soap opera Emmerdale, played by Natalie Ann Jamieson. She debuted on-screen during the episode airing on 8 October 2010, played by Chelsea Halfpenny. Since her inception Amy has been central to main storylines and has been played as the serial's rebellious teenager. Halfpenny has said she enjoys playing the character's mischievous side. Amy's unstable upbringing in children's homes and foster care has impacted on her persona. She is a troubled character and protects herself by creating a hard exterior. Amy's biggest fear is embarrassment and she aspires to lead a normal family life with her foster parents Val Pollard and Eric Pollard. As her storylines have developed she has grown close to the pair, yet rebelled at various stages. Charlie Hardwick and Chris Chittell who play Val and Eric have expressed their delight with the positive impact Amy has had on their on-screen family.

Other stories for the character include blackmail, one-night stands, heavy drinking and robberies. In 2011, the programme's series producer Stuart Blackburn devised a storyline to help viewers relate to Amy more. It began when Amy discovers she is pregnant by the serial's villain Cain Dingle. As the narrative progresses, Amy becomes ostracised as the fear of losing her new-found family increases. Halfpenny announced her departure from Emmerdale in October 2013, and she departed on 14 November 2013. The character was reintroduced on 7 March 2019, with Natalie Ann Jamieson now in the role. Amy has received mixed reviews from critics. Entertainment website Digital Spy has favoured many of her storylines. Halfpenny has been nominated for three Best Newcomer awards for her portrayal of Amy.

The character was killed off on 20 February 2025 after suffering a cardiac arrest due to severe hypothermia suffered after a limousine crash involving several other established characters.

== Character development ==
=== Creation and characterisation ===
Amy's edgy, sassy, and exudes a wisdom beyond her years, which is just as well as she likes everyone to believe she's 19. She's not had an easy start at life, having been bounced around from foster home to foster home, but she seems to have found a kindred spirit in Val. A quick learner and an instinctive judge of character, Amy will not hesitate to exploit her looks to get what she wants but at times can veer between the woman she wants to be and the young girl she still is.

— itv.com on Amy.

Series producer Gavin Blyth first mentioned Amy's arrival in June 2010. He said the characters of Val (Charlie Hardwick) and Eric Pollard (Chris Chittell) faced a "fascinating future" with the arrival of a "fresh-faced stranger who takes a shine to the pair." Amy debuted on-screen on 8 October 2010 when she found herself stranded outside the village. She later moves in with Val and Eric and attempts to rebuild her life.

Amy is a happy character with a mischievous personality. As Amy grew up in foster care it shows in her persona. Though it is often hard for people to understand why she acts wayward, she also has the vulnerability factor. Halfpenny said she likes Amy's mischievous side and hoped she would not learn to be sensible. Halfpenny also felt it was important that Amy remained youthful because she disliked portrayals of teenagers growing up too quickly. She found it easy to portray a character younger than herself as she could base aspects of Amy's story on her own teenage experience. At times she is scared she puts on a "hard exterior". Amy has a distinct style, Halfpenny described it as being quite "out there" in her choice of clothing and make-up. Halfpenny said that viewers would not be getting used to Amy's "nice side" and reminded them that she is good at "lying and scheming". She concluded that Amy's bad side was due to resurface.

=== Adjusting to family life ===
"Underneath it all, Amy has a good heart. She could be a very nice girl if she was shown some real love and had some proper friends."

— Halfpenny on Amy (2011)

After Val and Eric foster Amy, she starts acting rebellious again. She starts drinking and throwing herself at men, forcing her foster parents to have second thoughts. Halfpenny told Inside Soap that Amy goes off the rails because she is convinced everything goes wrong in her life. "She's afraid of getting hurt, so she spoils things for herself before anyone else can get there first." Halfpenny explained that Val's parental approach compared to Eric's was contrasting. Eric had not been around when his son David Metcalfe (Matthew Wolfenden) grew up, Halfpenny said this factor meant that Eric is not tolerant with Amy's bad behaviour. Though, Val had brought up her own children, her approach towards Amy is "light-hearted." However, when Amy continues her alcohol binges, Val and Eric feel she has "gone too far" and "question their ability to cope with her." Served with an ultimatum, Amy has to endure changes to remain with her new family. Halfpenny claimed the main change she had to make was "to keep her tongue in her own mouth and cool it down with the boys."

Off-screen Wolfenden, Hardwick and Chittel were thrilled by Amy's inclusion. Wolfenden said Halfpenny's acting skill has "freshened the whole place up." In comparison, David was initially hostile to Amy's inclusion in his family. However, in one storyline his attitude towards her softens and results in Amy developing feelings for him. Wolfenden said David "has a soft spot for Amy" and flirted with her. Over time he began to see her as his "little sister." When David's girlfriend, Leyla Harding (Roxy Shahidi) accuses Amy of stealing from the shop, David proves her innocence by exposing Alicia Gallagher (Natalie Anderson) as the thief. Wolfenden added that David has given out the wrong signals and acted naive during the story arc. Wolfenden explained that Amy misreads the signs because "she never had that sort of affection when she was growing up." Amy kisses David which shocks him, though Wolfenden felt it should not surprise him. Amy lies to her best friend Victoria Sugden (Isabel Hodgins), claiming she has slept with him and runs away from home.

Halfpenny revealed that Amy genuinely liked David and thought the feeling was mutual. "She wouldn't do it to embarrass herself; i think that is one of Amy's biggest fears being embarrassed." When David tracks Amy down; she blackmails him in return for the truth but David exposes her to Eric. Halfpenny said Amy was hurt by David's deception because she trusted him and despite their problems had a "good relationship". Eric tries to convince Amy to return home to lead the life she had always wanted, because "deep down he really cares about her." The strict parenting role is played once again with Eric, and Halfpenny branded the moment as Amy "meeting her match." As "nothing is straight forward with Amy", she returns home but finds telling the truth hard. Amy settles into village life until Jared Haynes (Philip Hill-Pearson) arrives and blackmails Amy. An Emmerdale spokesperson revealed that Amy had an affair with Jared's father and ruined his family. "She’s got herself in a mess and this is just the start of her problems." Amy steals from Val and Eric to pay Jared off. At this point in the story Val and Eric "are sick of Amy's bad behaviour." Val refuses to give her any more help.

=== Cain Dingle and pregnancy ===
"Amy's easily swayed. Because of how badly Cain reacts she thinks the best option is to get rid of the baby. On the day, she just wants to get it over with. [...] She sees the ultrasound scan of the baby and realises she doesn't want to get rid of it. Because Amy hasn't had love in her life she doesn't want to do that to anybody else."

— Halfpenny on the pregnancy storyline. (2011)

Amy's role in the serial increased with her much publicised pregnancy storyline. The plot begins when Amy has sex with Cain Dingle (Jeff Hordley). Halfpenny said "It's Amy who takes the lead and it goes from there." Hordley explained that Amy's attention inflates Cain's ego and he thinks "'aye, aye". It's still young but in his book, he's like, 'wahey, I've still got it'." However, when he learns she is sixteen, "he feels incredibly stupid and "embarrassed." Cain shows no guilt and orders her to keep her distance. Halfpenny said Amy is not fazed by Cain's attitude and uses the situation to make David jealous.

In August 2011, Amy discovers she is pregnant and is left in a state of shock. With the storyline Halfpenny received her busiest filming schedules since she started filming. Halfpenny told What's on TV that "it couldn't have come at a worse time" because Amy is on her final chance with Val and Eric. Cain is unsympathetic, angry – while Amy is scared. Hordley said Cain wants to keep it "low-key – to get rid and then move on." He attempts to force her into an abortion and Amy agrees because she isn't "very bright" and thinks it will be the "easier option." When she sees her ultrasound scan, Amy cannot go ahead with the abortion due to her own upbringing. Amy's left in a terrified frame of mind when Victoria tells her about Cain's violent past.

As the storyline developed, it held the potential to ruin the positive changes that the character had achieved. Halfpenny said Amy had become really close to Val and Eric. They are in a "good place" and they think "Amy's all happy." The one person she wants to tell is Val, with whom she shares the closest bond and shes "gutted" to remain silent. It prevents them from having a normal parent/child relationship, as the truth would ruin her one last chance. Halfpenny said her portrayal turns Amy to a "dark place" as she is "too young to be coping with something like this." As Amy becomes preoccupied with fear in case Cain finds out, Halfpenny said it makes Amy do "something dangerous." Though, Amy has Victoria to fall back on and is described as "her rock". Emmerdale series producer Stuart Blackburn said the storyline would change the lives of a lot of people around Amy. At times he said the narrative is "truly heart breaking" and dangerous. "I think it's going to change perceptions of Amy [...] we’re going to start to understand Amy an awful lot more."

=== Departure ===
On 11 October 2013, it was announced Halfpenny would be leaving Emmerdale. The actress said she had had "an amazing experience" with the show and added "It's completely changed my life, as it's given me confidence and I'm coming out of it having learnt so much. I now feel ready to move on and play other characters, although playing Amy Wyatt has been more fun than I'd ever imagined."

=== Reintroduction ===
Following Halfpenny's departure from Casualty in January 2019, speculation began that she would reprise her role as Amy. However, Halfpenny stated that she would not be returning to Emmerdale, as she wanted to do other things with her career. On 21 January, Jess Less of Digital Spy confirmed the character of Amy would be returning to the show, but with Natalie Ann Jamieson in the role. Of her casting, Jamieson said "I feel very lucky to be joining the cast of such a loved and respected show. I'm very grateful for this opportunity, and can't wait to find out what the future holds for Amy!"

== Storylines ==
=== 2010–2013 ===
Amy's car breaks down outside the village and Andy Sugden (Kelvin Fletcher) stops to help. Amy claims she is pregnant but Andy knows she is lying and takes her to the local garage.

While her car is being serviced, Amy checks into the B&B where she meets Val and Eric and claims to be a trainee nurse to get a discount; but tells Victoria that she is actually 16 and has run away from foster care. Victoria tries to sneak Amy out without paying but Val catches her so she offers to pay her debt by working for them. The police arrive and inform Val that Amy stole her foster parents' car and she leaves with a social worker. Victoria stays in touch with Amy and when she runs away again, Victoria hides her in the B&B's basement. Val finds her and lets her stay but Eric insists she leave. Amy visits Val again and tells her that her foster parents have separated and she is moving to a care home. Amy locks herself in a bathroom and workers at the care home telephone Val, claiming she will not come out until Val arrives. Val arranges for Amy to stay at the B&B and later fosters her.

Amy starts working for Leyla and develops feelings for David, who pays her attention. Amy sleeps with Cain and tries to make David jealous. When Alicia steals £500 worth of stock, Leyla accuses Amy but David defends her and Alicia admits it was her. Amy kisses David on the cheek to thank him for his support and misinterpreting his concern, makes further advances but runs away after David rejects her. When she comes home, she blackmails David and tells Victoria that she slept with him but later admits that she lied. Amy, Val and Eric move into their new home at the barn conversion but her happiness is short-lived as a young man from her past, Jared, tracks her down. He threatens to tell her new family and friends about her past and demands money to keep quiet until Zak Dingle (Steve Halliwell) intervenes, realizing something is wrong. She tells Zak about her past and makes him promise to keep quiet. She pays Jared but when threatened by Zak, he reveals that Amy's affair with his father caused his family to break down. Zak makes Jared leave but Amy discovers she is pregnant and tells Cain, who demands she have a termination. Victoria suggests Amy tell Val but at the clinic, learns that her pregnancy is too advanced for a termination and the baby is due in December. She tells Belle Dingle (Eden Taylor-Draper) about the baby but insists that Belle keep it secret, scared of Cain's reaction. Amy gives birth to a baby boy in the church graveyard. Thinking he is dead, Amy wraps him in her jumper before leaving him in a telephone box and goes to David's house. She tells him what has happened and he learns that the baby has been found alive and taken to hospital. Knowing Amy needs medical attention, he waits for her to fall asleep and calls an ambulance, Val and Eric. At the hospital, she apologizes for keeping her pregnancy a secret and initially decides to keep the baby, now named Kyle, delighting Val and Eric. On Christmas Day 2011, Amy is bathing Kyle but freezes when she remembers her mother dropping her in the bath and giving her to social services. Amy runs away, leaving Kyle with Val, and confides in Victoria who helps her decide to give Kyle up for adoption. Val is upset by Amy's decision and that Eric is supporting her, making them drift apart. Val tries to win Amy back with a family trip to Portugal but goes alone and clears the bank account. Amy is upset when Eric begins dating Brenda Walker (Lesley Dunlop) and attempts to keep them apart; however, she realizes how happy Brenda makes Eric and supports the relationship.

Amy discovers that Kyle's adoptive parents have died. She and Victoria attend the funeral to see if Kyle is there and see him at the wake with his adoptive grandmother, Joanie Wright (Denise Black). When Kyle drops his toy, Amy picks it up and tries to give it back but Joanie doesn't hear her so she keeps it. Amy returns the next day and a barmaid gives her Joanie's address. Amy plans to return the toy but changes her mind and leaves. Needing to see Kyle, she persuades Andy to let her take baby Jack to Kyle's playgroup and makes friends with Joanie, telling her that she is studying childcare and asking if she needs any help with Kyle. Joanie accepts and allows Amy to look after Kyle occasionally. Val is thrilled when she finds out but Victoria and Eric think it is a bad idea and Eric tells Joanie that Amy is Kyle's birth mother. Disgusted, Joanie refuses to let Amy see Kyle again but is eventually persuaded to change her mind. Sadly, while Amy and Kyle are on a picnic together, Kyle almost drowns and Joanie blames Amy. She promptly bans her from seeing Kyle and refuses to even consider changing her mind, even calling the police when Amy visits repeatedly, who warn her to stay away. Desperate to see her son, Amy and Andy (who she is now dating) call Social Services to see if she can get custody but the social worker tells her that being awarded custody is very unlikely. Feeling now that the adoption was a mistake, Amy decides to snatch Kyle and go on the run. Kerry, understanding how Amy feels, tries to talk her out of it but when she can't, decides to help her. They go to Kyle's playgroup and kidnap him and Kerry drives them to the docks. During the drive, Val phones repeatedly but they don't answer. Eventually Kerry answers and Amy tearfully reveals her plans before throwing the phone away. Eric checks the computer's internet history and finds out where Amy is going. Cain, Andy, Val, Eric and Joanie all rush to the docks. In the end, Cain persuades Amy to return Kyle, warning her of the complications of the life on the run and how Kyle might be affected. She says goodbye to Kyle and gives him to Cain but fearing she'll be sent to prison, Amy leaves, devastating Val. Val later gets a call from Amy and learns that she is living in Ireland with her aunt.

In September 2015, David informs Amy of Val's death and the funeral date, but Amy believes it would be too big a risk to return to the village. She passes her regards to Eric and the family.

=== 2019–2025 ===
Amy (now played by Natalie Ann Jamieson) is found by Kerry and Jessie Dingle (Sandra Marvin) in Belfast, fighting off a scruffy man. Kerry initially thinks she is a prostitute, but a horrified Amy denies it, and says she works at a women's shelter, and the man she fought off was one of the women's husbands. When Kerry tells her that Kyle is living with Cain, Amy is horrified, but when Kerry begs her to come back to the village, she says she can't and flees. However, the next day, she leaves Ireland and secretly returns to Emmerdale, surprising her mother. Amy tells Kerry she will fight for Kyle.

Amy's storylines since her return see her re-enter Kyle's life and form a reasonably amicable co-parenting situation with Cain. Amy begins dating Nate Robinson (Jurell Carter) in 2019, however he breaks her heart by having an affair with Moira Barton, which leads to the reveal that Nate is Cain's biological son. Amy and Kerry later break into Jai Sharma (Chris Bisson)'s sweet factory, starting an accidental fire which ultimately kills Vanessa Woodfield (Michelle Hardwick) and Tracy Shankley (Amy Walsh)'s father, Frank. Amy and Kerry struggle to live with their guilt, but after eventually confessing to the sisters who agree to let it be for the sake of Amy's son, Amy begins to rebuild her life.

Amy later begins dating, and eventually marries in 2024, Moira's son Matty Barton (Ash Palmasciano). Amy is incredibly supportive of Matty's struggles with his transgender identity and when Matty is held on remand for assaulting Samson Dingle's friend, Amy stands by him. Heading into 2025, Matty and Amy make plans to adopt a child and grow their family.

However, in February 2025, tragedy strikes on Valentine's Day, when a limousine driven by Charity Dingle swerves off of the road to avoid hitting her disoriented son Noah Dingle (Jack Downham), who has wandered into the road. The limousine crashes into a frozen lake. Suzy Merton is an immediate fatality, while all of the other women and Liam Cavanagh (Jonny McPherson) are able to get out. However, while crossing the lake, Amy falls beneath the ice. She sinks into the freezing ice-cold water and discovers a chained body with a friendship bracelet - identical to one Amy wears, gifted to her by Tracy and Nate's young daughter Frankie. Tracy is able to rescue Amy, who is admitted to hospital with hypothermia. Leyla Harding (Roxy Shahidi) dies upon arrival, while Amy remains in a brief coma. Amy is visited by Kyle and Cain, as well as Matty and Kerry, where they all tell her how much they love her. Amy initially pulls through and awakens as the staff help her to warm up. Amy tries to tell Matty that she saw the body in the lake, revealing it to be Nate's, however struggles to get the words out. She just manages to tell Matty she loves him before she flatlines and goes into cardiac arrest. Much to Matty's horror, and later Cain's as he arrives, Amy passes away. Cain is left to tell Kyle what has happened to his mother.

== Reception ==
In 2011, Halfpenny was nominated in the category of "Best Soap Newcomer" at the TV Choice Awards. She was later nominated in the category of "Best Newcomer" at the Inside Soap Awards. She was later nominated for "Best Newcomer" at the 2012 National Television Awards. Jane Simon of the Daily Mirror said Amy's first scenes resembled the start of a "teen horror movie." Inside Soap described Amy stating: "To survive in soapland you need attitude – and Amy Wyatt isn't lacking in that department." Amy's death was shortlisted for "Best Exit" at the 2025 Inside Soap Awards, whilst the Limo crash disaster was longlisted for "Best Showstopper".

Entertainment website Digital Spy have chosen certain plots featuring Amy in their "Picture of the day" recommendation feature. These include Amy being accused of thieving, blackmailing David and revealing her pregnancy to Cain.

In 2019, following Jamieson's debut, Laura-Jayne Tyler from Inside Soap praised the recast, writing that whilst Jamieson had "big shoes to fill", she "made the transition seem completely seamless – and is totally owning the role. We think she's fab! Meanwhile, kudos to the casting director who was under huge pressure to faithfully revive such an important character".
