= Natalie Ann Jamieson =

English actress (born 1988)

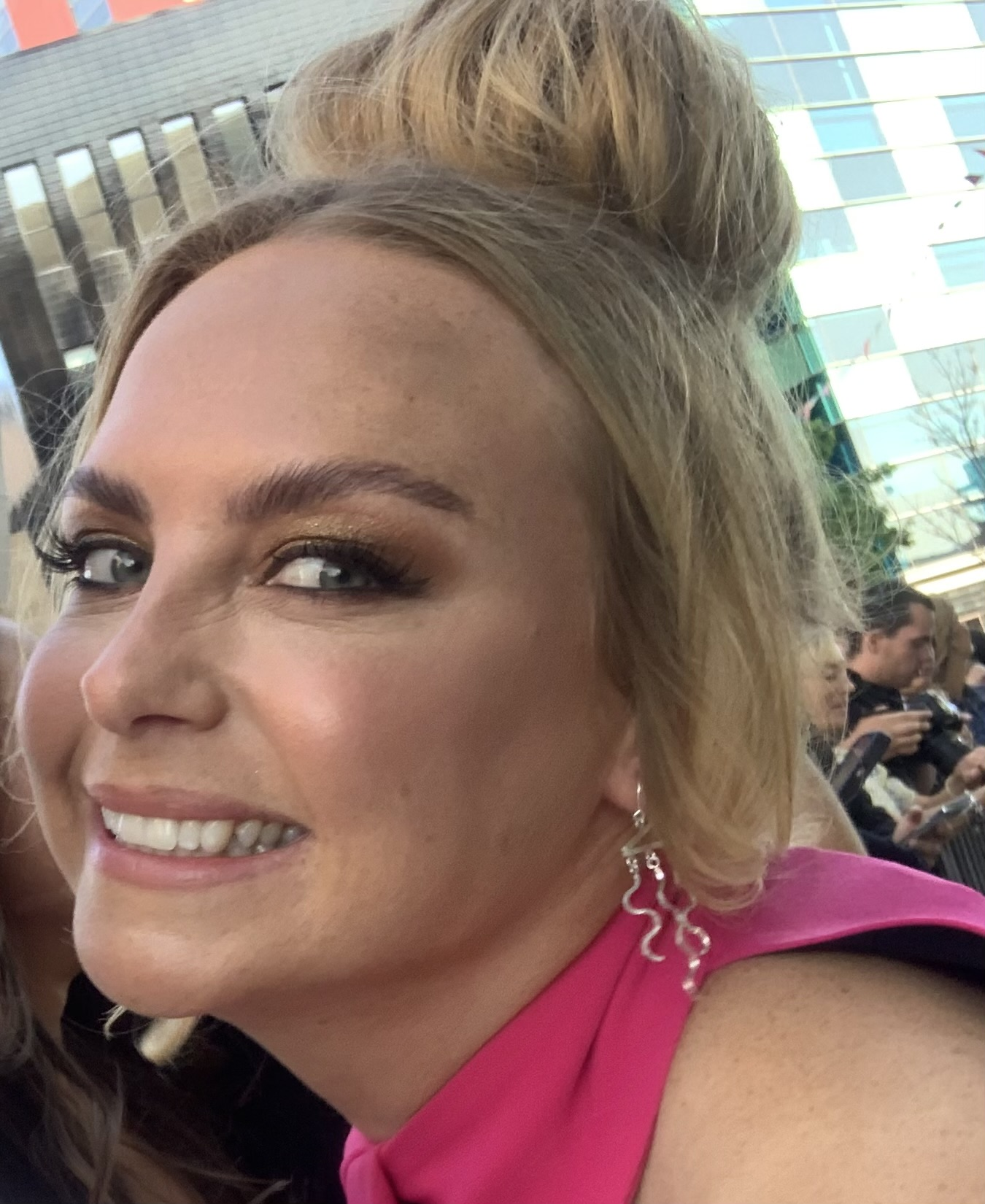
- Jamieson in 2023
- Born: 9 February 1988 (age 38); Walker, Newcastle upon Tyne, England
- Education: Rose Bruford College
- Occupation: Actress
- Years active: 2012–present
- Television: Emmerdale
- Partner: Ali Ward (2010–present)

Natalie Ann Jamieson (born 9 February 1988) is an English actress, known for playing Amy Wyatt in the ITV soap opera Emmerdale from 2019 to 2025, when her character was killed off.

== Early and personal life ==
Natalie Ann Jamieson was born on 9 February 1988 in Newcastle upon Tyne. She grew up in Walker and lived near to St James' Park. Jamieson grew up supporting Newcastle United F.C. She has been in a relationship with boyfriend Ali Ward since 2010. When asked in 2024 when she would marry him, she said that the couple were putting it off due to the amount weddings cost, and wanting to spend the money on other things.

Jamieson grew up in a working class family and attended the Live Youth Theatre in Newcastle, going on to attend Newcastle College. She later studied acting at Rose Bruford College in Bexley, from which she graduated in 2011. She auditioned for a place in drama school three times and stated that getting rejected twice was difficult due to travelling from Newcastle down to the south of the country. She worked two jobs to pay for the auditions; a department store in the daytime and a club at night, meaning she would finish at 4am and start work again at 9am. She also had a short-term job where she dressed in Tudor costume and would give tours of the city.

== Career ==
Jamieson made her television debut in a 2016 episode of the ITV1 crime drama series Vera. That same year, she made her film debut in I, Daniel Blake. Then in 2018, she appeared in an episode of the BBC medical soap opera Doctors. Later in 2018, Jamieson auditioned for the part of Amy Wyatt in the ITV soap opera Emmerdale. Jamieson had previously worked with Laura Norton, who portrays Amy's on-screen mother, Kerry Wyatt, when she had performed in a play Norton had written. She was successful in getting the part, becoming the second actress to portray Amy, following Chelsea Halfpenny's previous stint. She made her on-screen debut in 2019, and later that year, she received a nomination for Best Newcomer at the TV Choice Awards. In 2020, she co-hosted the Ad Libbing Podcast alongside Ward, her boyfriend. She has also made guest appearances on Pointless Celebrities and Celebrity Mastermind. On the latter, she raised funds for Cure Usher, a charity that supports people with Usher syndrome. In February 2025, it was announced that Jamieson had left Emmerdale, with her character killed off.

== Filmography ==
| Year | Title | Role | Notes | Ref. |
|---|---|---|---|---|
| 2012 | Diana | Sinead | Short film | |
| 2016 | Vera | Karen | Episode: "The Sea Glass" | |
| 2016 | I, Daniel Blake | Employment Support Allowance Assessor | Film | |
| 2018 | Doctors | Ella Bridges | Episode: "Rough Injustice" | |
| 2019–2025 | Emmerdale | Amy Wyatt | Regular role | |
| 2022 | Pointless Celebrities | Herself | Contestant | |
| 2024 | Celebrity Mastermind | Herself | Contestant | |

== Awards and nominations ==
| Year | Award | Category | Nominated work | Result | Ref. |
|---|---|---|---|---|---|
| 2019 | TV Choice Awards | Best Newcomer | Emmerdale | Nominated | |
