= List of Emmerdale characters introduced in 2017 =

Emmerdale is a British soap opera first broadcast on 16 October 1972. The following is a list of characters that first appeared in 2017, by order of first appearance. Gerry Roberts (Shaun Thomas) became the first character to be introduced in the beginning of January as the friend of Lachlan White (Thomas Atkinson). Maggie, (Philippa Howell), Ethan (Michael Warrender) and Jason (Samuel Edward-Cook) then made their debuts in February. Nell Fairfax (Scarlett Archer) was introduced in March as a friend of Jai Sharma's (Chris Bisson), while Matt (Jack Hickey) arrived in May as the ex-boyfriend of Carly Hope (Gemma Atkinson). Tim Richards (Mark Moraghan) arrived in July as the uncle of Chrissie White (Louise Marwood). In September, Graham Foster (Andrew Scarborough) was introduced as the father figure of Joe Tate (Ned Porteous). October saw the birth of Isaac Dingle. Jessie Grant (Sandra Marvin), Sebastian White (Lily Westmoreland) and Dee Dee (Mia Gibson-Reed) all made their first appearances in November. Additionally, multiple other characters appeared throughout the year.

== Gerry Roberts ==
Gerry Roberts
- Emmerdale character
- Portrayed by: Shaun Thomas
- Duration: 2017–2018
- First appearance: Episode 7714; 5 January 2017
- Last appearance: Episode 8152; 17 May 2018

Gerry Roberts, played by Shaun Thomas, made his first screen appearance on 5 January 2017. He is introduced as the cell-mate of established character Lachlan White (Thomas Atkinson). Gerry's death won the accolade for "Most Devastating Soap Death" at the 2018 Digital Spy Reader Awards.

Gerry first appears as the cell-mate of Lachlan. He gives Lachlan a black-eye, which makes Lachlan's mother, Chrissie (Louise Marwood), feel sorry for her son, so she gives Lachlan a Porsche when he is released, to make him feel better. When Lachlan visits Gerry in prison, he thanks Gerry, as Chrissie will give Lachlan anything as she feels sorry for him.

When he is released, Gerry turns up at Home Farm. After making up a story to Chrissie, saying that his family are either in prison or in rehab, she agrees to let him stay at Home Farm for a few days. After Lachlan tells him about his virginity, Gerry arranges for him to have sex with a prostitute, for experience for when he sleeps with his girlfriend, Belle Dingle (Eden Taylor-Draper). However, Lachlan refuses to go through with the plan.

Doug Potts (Duncan Preston) lets Gerry move into the B&B for a while. However, after an incident with Gerry handling illegal fireworks on Bonfire Night, Doug throws Gerry out. Gerry then starts to sneak into the B&B regularly, but is caught eating Doug's food in a covered corner. Aaron Dingle (Danny Miller) agrees to let Gerry stay at Mill Cottage, after being persuaded to by Aaron's sister and Gerry's good friend, Liv Flaherty (Isobel Steele). Gerry eventually finds out that Lachlan caused the car crash that killed Chrissie and Lawrence. Although he swears to keep the secret, Lachlan grows paranoid and fears that Gerry cannot be trusted, and as a result, Lachlan murders him in the B&B while repairs are underway.

== Maggie ==
Maggie
- Emmerdale character
- Portrayed by: Philippa Howell
- First appearance: Episode 7746; 10 February 2017
- Last appearance: Episode 7772; 14 March 2017

Maggie, played by Philippa Howell, made her first appearance on 10 February 2017. Howell was contracted for eight episodes as dementia patient Maggie. The character was among Howell's first roles since she returned to acting after 20 years as an actors' agent.

Maggie resides at Turnfield Court Care Home, where is suffering from dementia. She befriends the newly arrived Ashley Thomas (John Middleton). Ashley's wife Laurel Thomas (Charlotte Bellamy) meets Maggie outside Ashley's room, and Maggie asks her how her hair looks. Laurel initially mistakes Maggie for a visitor. Laurel later sees Ashley and Maggie talking and laughing together, and she and her stepdaughter Gabby Thomas (Rosie Bentham) decide to leave them alone. When Laurel brings a picnic for Ashley, she realises that Ashley is more interested in spending time with Maggie. She also notices them holding hands. Ashley gives Maggie his wedding ring, and when Laurel tries to get it back, Maggie slaps her. Ashley later kisses Maggie in front of Laurel, Gabby and Arthur Thomas (Alfie Clarke). Laurel asks that Ashley and Maggie are kept apart, but when she learns that Ashley is hiding food in his pockets for Maggie, she relents. Laurel prepares a meal for Ashley and Maggie, but becomes upset when they start holding hands and she leaves. Ashley later leaves the care home and dies at home.

== Ethan ==
Ethan
- Emmerdale character
- Portrayed by: Michael Warrender
- First appearance: Episode 7756/7757; 23 February 2017
- Last appearance: Episode 7873/7874; 11 July 2017

Ethan, played by Michael Warrender, made his first appearance on 23 February 2017. Warrender auditioned for the role at the end of 2016 and learned he had secured the part shortly before Christmas. He commented, "My agent called and said the director loved me and wanted to give me the role. I couldn't believe it, I was just so shocked. It was a brilliant Christmas present." Warrender began filming in January 2017 and Emmerdale marked his first role. Ethan is Aaron Dingle's (Danny Miller) cellmate.

Aaron meets Ethan in their cell and Ethan threatens him, before revealing that he is joking. Ethan asks Aaron for photos of his girlfriend, but Aaron does not have any, so Ethan gives him a page of his calendar. Ethan introduces Aaron to fellow inmate Jason (Samuel Edward-Cook). Aaron tries to defend another prisoner when Jason begins shouting homophobic abuse at him. Ethan questions Aaron, and Aaron tells him that his brother is gay. Ethan admits that he does not like the homophobic abuse either, as his best friend is a lesbian, but things are different behind bars. A week later, Jason reveals Aaron is gay and Ethan begins acting hostile towards him. After Aaron is beaten up by Jason, Ethan offers Aaron some spice. Aaron asks Ethan to get him some more in time for his visit later, but Ethan tells him he cannot. He also reveals that Jason is the only dealer on the wing. Aaron agrees to sell drugs for Jason, against Ethan's warnings that his appeal will be in jeopardy if he is caught.

== Jason ==
Jason
- Emmerdale character
- Portrayed by: Samuel Edward-Cook
- First appearance: Episode 7756/7757; 23 February 2017
- Last appearance: Episode 7922; 30 August 2017

Jason, played by Samuel Edward-Cook, made his first appearance on 23 February 2017. Jason is an inmate at HMP Hotten, who subjects Aaron Dingle (Danny Miller) to homophobic abuse. Edward-Cook accepted the role as he knew it would be challenging. He said, "it wasn't too daunting or out of my comfort zone as characters like Jason are attractive because they're so removed from me as a person. It was a really exciting opportunity." The actor was aware that his character was going to be hated, and found support from the cast and crew during his "heavier scenes" where Jason was violent and homophobic. Edward-Cook called Jason a "twisted, angry young man" and thought it was left to the viewers to guess the reason why. However, he added that if Jason returned, it would be good to explore his backstory. Lindsay branded Jason a "vicious top dog" and "an unsavoury character who has certainly stirred up a reaction among fans."

Jason meets Aaron Dingle on his first day at HMP Hotten. Jason is impressed that Aaron belongs to the Dingle family and asks about his uncle Cain Dingle (Jeff Hordley). Jason targets a gay inmate and shouts homophobic abuse at him, but Aaron stands up for him. Jason realises Aaron is gay after seeing him with his boyfriend Robert Sugden (Ryan Hawley) during visiting hours. Jason later makes a comment to Aaron's mother Chas Dingle (Lucy Pargeter) about her son being gay, and Chas warns him to stay away from Aaron. Jason and Aaron fight, and he later learns that Aaron is the son of former inmate Gordon Livesy (Gary Mavers). Jason taunts Aaron, who punches him. Jason and his gang attack Aaron in his cell later that day. Jason also throws Aaron into the cell where Gordon hung himself. Aaron later asks Jason for some spice, and Jason agrees to give him some if Aaron delivers drugs to other inmates.

== Nell Fairfax ==
Nell Fairfax, played by Scarlett Archer, made her first screen appearance on 30 March 2017. Archer was a fan of the show before she was cast as Nell. She found the filming schedule to be "quite terrifying". She said she enjoyed playing Nell, adding "It's always fun to play someone who is quite different from you in real life, and Nell is very much that. I'm much more grounded and more confident than her!" Nell was introduced as a new friend for Jai Sharma (Chris Bisson). When Jai meets Nell at Narcotics Anonymous. She reminds him of his deceased girlfriend Holly Barton (Sophie Powles) and becomes determined to help her. It was announced on 9 July 2017 that the character would be departing the serial at the conclusion of her storyline. Nell's departure comes "as a blow" for Jai, with Daniel Kilkelly of Digital Spy predicting the departure would feature "more of the same" drama that Nell had featured in prior to her departure. Producers chose to not disclose details of Nell's departure at the time of its announcement. Nell departed during the episode broadcast on 12 September 2017.

== Matt ==
Matt
- Emmerdale character
- Portrayed by: Jack Hickey
- First appearance: 12 May 2017
- Last appearance: 2 June 2017
In-universe information
- Occupation: Trainee barman
- Sons: Billy Hope

Matt, played by Jack Hickey, made his first appearance on 12 May 2017. The character and casting details were announced on 9 May. Matt is the former boyfriend of Carly Hope (Gemma Atkinson), and the father of her son, Billy, who died shortly after he was born. Matt departed the village with Carly on 2 June 2017.

Matt comes to the village to ask Carly why she did not inform him about Billy's death at the time. Speaking to an Irish Daily Star reporter, Hickey called the storyline "a heartbreaking one" and said, "Matt is a grieving dad, and he and Carly have a complicated and dark history. And it's safe to say he comes back to confront her on several levels." Daniel Kilkelly of Digital Spy also hinted that another resident would "have their eye on Matt".

In May 2017, Carly sees a photo of Matt on social media and sends him a message. Matt pitches up in Emmerdale and books into the B&B. He comes face to face with Carly and confronts her about not telling him their son was dead. He explains how he felt guilty for grieving the son he did not know. Carly's boyfriend Marlon Dingle walks in and, upon seeing how distressed Carly is, tries to throw out Matt, but Matt punches him.

== Tim Richards ==
Tim Richards
- Emmerdale character
- Portrayed by: Mark Moraghan
- First appearance: Episode 7868; 5 July 2017
- Last appearance: Episode 7967; 19 October 2017
In-universe information
- Brothers: John Richards
- Nieces: Chrissie White
- Other relatives: Lachlan White

Tim Richards, played by Mark Moraghan, made his first appearance on 5 July 2017. The character and Moraghan's casting were announced on 13 June. Tim is Chrissie White's (Louise Marwood) biological uncle. Tim sends Chrissie a letter telling her that her adoptive father Lawrence White (John Bowe) has been deceiving her regarding the fate of her biological father, John. Lawrence reads the letter and pays Tim a visit warning him to stay away from his family. Tim, wanting to meet Chrissie as she is the only family he has left, initially refuses, but reluctantly agrees to stay away when Lawrence has him beaten up. Lawrence pays him money to stay away and then leaves.

== Graham Foster ==
Graham Foster
- Emmerdale character
- Portrayed by: Andrew Scarborough
- Duration: 2017–2020, 2026–present
- First appearance: Episode 7927; 5 September 2017
- Crossover appearances: Corriedale (2026)
In-universe information
- Occupation: Soldier; SAS trooper Groundsman; Businessman
- Brothers: Steven Foster
- Wife: Cheryl Foster (backstory); Kim Tate (2012-)
- Adoptive sons: Joe Tate
- Stepsons: Jamie Tate

Graham Foster, played by Andrew Scarborough, made his first appearance on 5 September 2017. Graham Foster is Joe Tate's (Ned Porteous) father figure and legal guardian. Scarborough's initial exit from the serial was announced on 3 November 2019, with the actor filming his final scenes within the coming weeks. Graham exited on 27 January 2020 after he was apparently killed off by Pierce Harris (Jonathan Wrather). Grantham returned to the role six years later when it turns out that Graham had survived.

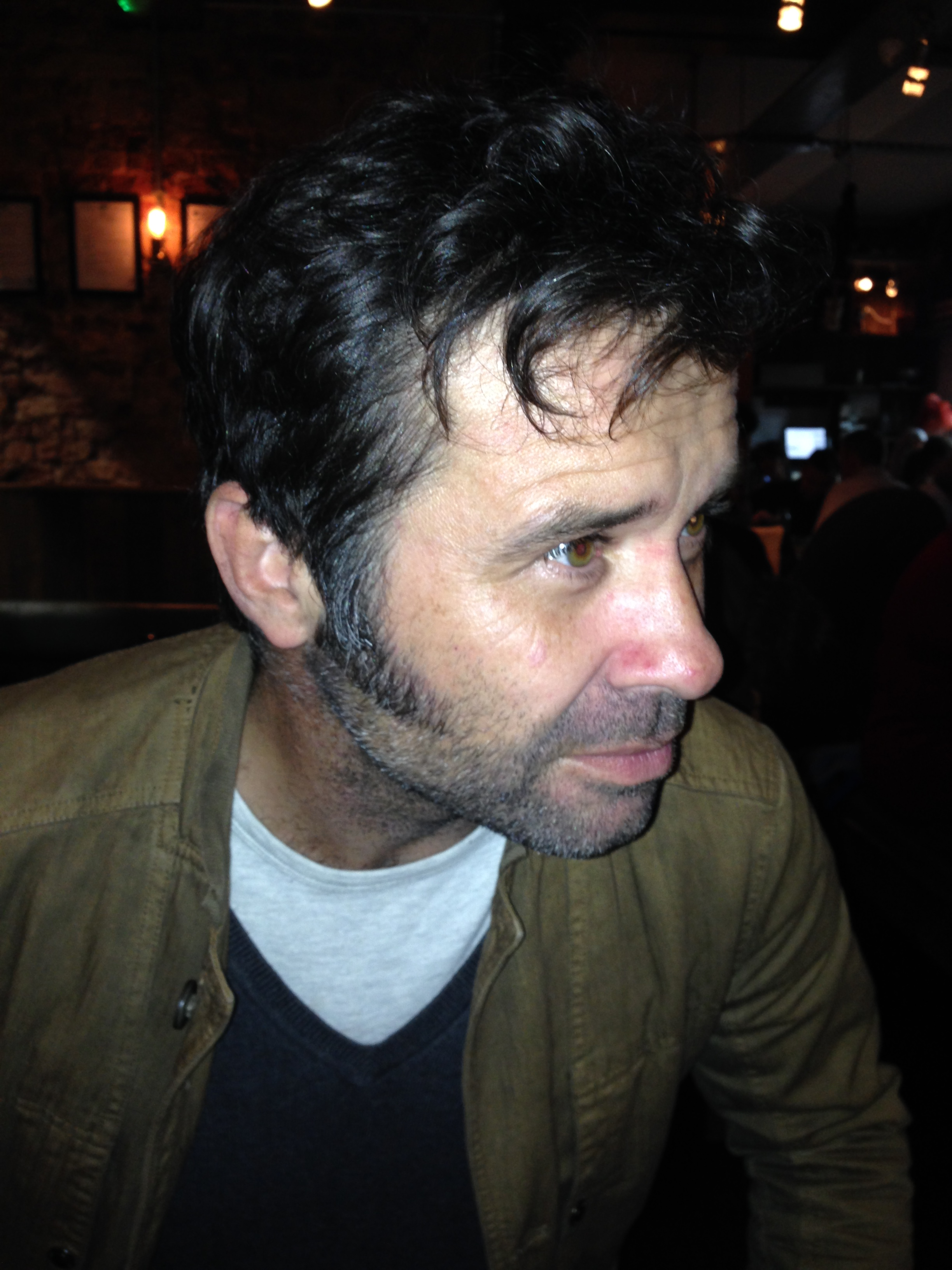
Andrew Scarborough began playing Graham in September 2017.

In his backstory, Graham is in the SAS, which leads him to develop a drinking problem. Graham meets a woman named Cheryl (Vanessa Earl), whom he gets pregnant. Although Graham does not love Cheryl, he marries her. Around Cheryl's due date, Graham takes leave so he can be at his daughter's birth. After dropping Cheryl off at her baby shower, Graham heads to the pub where he downs a bottle of whisky, and, on the drive home, Graham loses control of the car on a bend, flipping the car, killing both Cheryl and his unborn daughter. Following this, Graham is discharged from the forces and gets a job as a school groundsman. Although he is drunk most of the time, Graham manages to hold on to his job, as the headteacher is too embarrassed to sack him owing to his background in the forces. It is at the school that Graham develops a close relationship with troubled teenager Joe Tate (Ned Porteous). Joe's aunt and guardian, Zoe Tate (Leah Bracknell), makes him Joe's guardian to prevent Joe from being expelled. One night, Graham sets his residence on fire with himself inside in a suicide attempt. Joe finds him and pulls him out. After the fire, Graham remaines sober and starts working for Joe.

In 2017, Graham is introduced as a client that Charity Dingle (Emma Atkins) and her daughter Debbie (Charley Webb) meet at a hotel, in a bid to keep their car hire business afloat. Debbie shows Graham some figures, but when she goes to show Graham the car, it is missing from the car park.

Graham is not deemed a "friendly" person. He had made many enemies by his untimely death. He was described as "poison" by many of his murder suspects. He turns against Kim for almost ruining his relationship with Rhona Goskirk, which causes Kim to have a motive to hill him. She hires Al Chapman to finish the job.

Graham next removes some cocaine found in Jai Sharma's car, which enrages him. Graham makes an enemy out of Jai by telling Laurel Thomas about how he is still an addict; she then dumps Jai. Graham is then shown to be severely hit by a torch. There is blood on Jai's knuckles, but it turns out that he has attacked Jimmy King.

Graham next locks Ryan Stocks in a confined space in a shed owing to the fact he double-crossed Ryan, who threatened to expose him, making another enemy out of Charity Dingle, who nearly hits him. Graham almost ruins Jamie Tate and Andrea Tate's marriage by stating he may have been Millie Tate's biological father, but a test turns out negative. Graham is then shown plummeting off a bridge, showing a cracked windscreen of a mysterious car that is not Jamie's. Andrea is soaked in blood but that turns out to be from a dog she ran over, not Graham's.

Lastly, Graham and Rhona's relationship is about to go the next stage as they leave for France, but Marlon Dingle is not happy. Graham takes Leo Goskirk and April Windsor to a park owing to the fact Marlon is busy. When he discovers Graham is leaving, he became infuriated and threatens to put Graham "in the ground".

Graham is later murdered. He is cremated off-screen in a private funeral organised by Kim Tate, much to Rhona's dismay.

Graham returns in January 2026 when he reveals that he faked his death by holding his breath when his body was found and taken to the morgue.

== Alex Mason ==
Alex Mason
- Emmerdale character
- Portrayed by: Steven Flynn
- Duration: 2017–2018
- First appearance: Episode 7939; 18 September 2017
- Last appearance: Episode 8077/8; 22 February 2018
In-universe information
- Occupation: Doctor

Doctor Alex Mason, portrayed by Steven Flynn, was a doctor who worked at Hotten General Hospital. He was on duty when Liv Flaherty (Isobel Steele) was rushed to hospital after drinking brandy Robert Sugden (Ryan Hawley) had spiked for his ex-father-in-law, Lawrence White (John Bowe). He took a liking to Liv's brother, Aaron Dingle (Danny Miller) and after Liv meddled, they swapped numbers. Their relationship came to an end after Aaron realised he had feelings for Robert.

Flynn departed on 22 February 2018, with him announcing his exit on Twitter the next day. He posted: "It's been a pleasure to play Alex. And in the end... we all knew the end game." He thanked his fans for their support in another tweet: "Thanks to everyone for their messages about tonight's episode! Time for Alex to runaway but I'm sure he wishes all the best for #Robron... deep down..."

== Isaac Dingle ==
Isaac Dingle
- Emmerdale character
- Portrayed by: Bobby Dunsmuir; Elias Walker; Harvey Brook
- Duration: 2017–present
- First appearance: Episode 7952; 3 October 2017
In-universe information
- Father: Cain Dingle
- Mother: Moira Dingle
- Half-brothers: Nate Robinson; Adam Barton; Matty Barton; Kyle Dingle
- Half-sisters: Debbie Dingle; Holly Barton
- Grandfathers: Zak Dingle
- Grandmothers: Faith Dingle
- Uncles: Butch Dingle; Ben Dingle; Caleb Miligan; Sam Dingle; Mackenzie Boyd
- Aunts: Chas Dingle; Belle Dingle
- Nephews: Jack Sugden
- Nieces: Sarah Sugden; Frankie Robinson
- First cousins: Aaron Dingle; Vinny Dingle; Nicky Miligan; Samson Dingle; Grace Dingle; Eve Dingle; Reuben Harris
- Other relatives: Charity Dingle; Marlon Dingle; Leyla Sugden

Isaac Dingle made his first appearance on 3 October 2017. He is the son of Cain (Jeff Hordley) and Moira Dingle (Natalie J. Robb).

Moira has one-night stands with her nephew in law, Pete Barton (Anthony Quinlan), and Cain following Moira's struggle to overcome the death of her daughter, Holly Barton (Sophie Powles). When Emma Barton (Gillian Kearney) is exposed as the one responsible for her late husband's, James Barton (Bill Ward), death, she confronts Moira over her own relationship with James. A fire breaks out in the barn and Moira tells Emma she is having Pete's baby. Emma assists Moira with the labour and delivers Moira's son. Moira loses consciousness and is found by her and James's son, Adam Barton (Adam Thomas), and his wife, Victoria Barton (Isabel Hodgins). Victoria tells Pete and his brother, Ross Barton (Michael Parr), that Moira has had a baby and Pete is the father. Cain finds out about the baby when Finn Barton (Joe Gill) is brought to hospital with gun shot wounds. Emma, disguised as a nurse, takes the baby from the hospital. Moira regains consciousness and finds out that Emma has taken her son. Emma leaves the baby in the church and is found by Harriet Finch (Katherine Dow Blyton). Cain's cousin, Charity Dingle (Emma Atkins), suspects Cain could be the father. Pete asks Moira if the baby could be given Finn as middle name and Moira devastates Pete when she admits that he may not be the father. Pete angrily informs Cain he may be the father. The results of a paternity test confirm Cain is the father, not Pete, and Cain chooses not to be involved with the baby, a decision Moira is fine with.

Moira gets stressed when the baby does not stop crying and she walks out of her house in tears. When the baby persistently cries, Moira calls the doctor and the baby is diagnosed with colic. Dissatisfied with the diagnosis, Moira takes the baby to the hospital, where the baby is given the same diagnosis. Moira tells Cain's mother, Faith Dingle (Sally Dexter), that she left the baby at the hospital and when they go to get him, they find the baby not there. They find the baby in the care of a nurse and Moira also agrees with Faith's name suggestion of Isaac. Moira feels that she is a terrible mother and receives a phonecall from social services. Social services visit to see how Moira is coping and feeling and when Cain looks after Isaac, Moira orders him away. When Adam and Victoria have a meeting about adopting a child, Moira gives them Isaac, insisting she does not want him. After revisiting his childhood home with Faith, Cain tells Moira he wants to be there for Isaac and look after him to give Moira a break. When Isaac is taken the hospital, Moira and Cain are told he has a heart murmur. Following Emma's death, Adam is arrested and charged for murder, but Moira confesses to being responsible for her death and she wants to own up to the police, but is advised against it by her family for Isaac's sake and Cain and Isaac's cousin, Aaron Dingle (Danny Miller), help him escape. Moira plans to leave Emmerdale, but Cain tells Moira that he loves her and arranges for them to meet, but if she does not show up, he will know she does not love him. Moira turns up and she and Cain reconcile.

Robb researched people who had no idea they were pregnant and spoke to a woman who had a surprise labour. Robb said there were medical professionals on set during the birth scenes. The storyline was confirmed a few months prior, but the story team conceived it in 2016. Moira is unaware of the baby's true paternity and only says it is Pete's to get Emma to help her. Robb added that the baby will be "absolutely life changing" for Moira.

== Jessie Grant ==
Jessie Grant
- Emmerdale character
- Portrayed by: Sandra Marvin
- Duration: 2017–2019
- First appearance: Episode 7978; 2 November 2017
- Last appearance: Episode 8593; 16 September 2019
In-universe information
- Other names: Jessie Dingle
- Occupation: Headteacher
- Husband: Evan Fletcher (backstory); Al Chapman (backstory); Marlon Dingle (2019–2020)
- Sons: Billy Fletcher; Ellis Chapman
- Stepsons: Leo Goskirk
- Stepdaughters: April Windsor

Jessie Grant (also Dingle), played by Sandra Marvin, made her first appearance on 2 November 2017. Marvin was confirmed to be a regular cast member after her first scenes were aired. Of joining the show, Marvin commented "I was nervous stepping on set for the first time, especially in The Woolpack which is the iconic hub of the community, but I felt very relaxed as everyone has been so welcoming. I've already had the obligatory photo by the village sign!" Jessie is the new headteacher of the local primary school. Marvin said Jessie is also new to the area. She will be interacting with the younger characters and their parents in the school setting. Marvin also said, "There's lots in store for Jessie but I can't say too much yet." On 12 August 2019, it was announced that Marvin had chosen to leave Emmerdale after nearly two years in the role of Jessie. She left on 16 September 2019.

Jessie is due to meet Rhona Goskirk (Zoe Henry) to discuss the redundancy of her son Leo Goskirk's (Harvey Rogerson) teaching assistant, Chris Greenway (James Speakman), but Rhona is forced to miss the meeting and claims that her car will not start. Leo's father, Marlon Dingle (Mark Charnock), and stepfather Paddy Kirk (Dominic Brunt), arrange to meet with Jessie at The Woolpack. Jessie initially believes that they are a couple. Jessie insists that she wanted to keep the teaching assistant on, but the budget was too small. Rhona arrives and assumes Paddy is on a date with Jessie and covers them in manure, as he is supposed to be working. Rhona then learns Jessie is Leo's headteacher. Jessie offers to forget about the incident when Rhona meets with her the following day. On 25 December 2018, Jessie marries Marlon in a surprise wedding. She is the mother of Ellis Chapman (Asan N'Jie) and Billy Fletcher (Jay Kontzle). Jessie takes Billy's side over Ellis', believing that Billy was falsely imprisoned for beating someone up, unaware that Billy lied to her, not wanting her to hate him. In June 2019, a dodgy associate of Billy's, Max (who also stabbed Ellis on a night out, which led Billy to leave him for dead) holds Marlon, Jessie and April hostage at Tall Trees. April manages to sneak out as Billy sneaks in and soon, Billy beats Max up, but Max manages to grab the gun and fires it towards Billy, but Jessie ends up getting shot instead. Jessie lies in Marlon's arms bleeding severely and she soon loses consciousness, being rushed to hospital in a critical condition. It's touch and go for a while but she comes out of surgery, having had stitches, she soon learns the truth that Billy was really guilty when he admits her that he lied to her. The two engage in an argument, which causes Jessie's stitches to rupture and her being taken back into surgery. Jessie refuses to forgive Billy but later realises she cannot give up on Billy, so she decides to forgive him, which leaves Marlon irritated. Upon being released from the hospital, Jessie receives a phone call from the school that the builders have had to stop work on a planned expansion due to some bones being found. Jessie later has to speak at a press conference about the whole situation and it's soon revealed that the bones of that of a baby, which is revealed to be Lydia Hart's (Karen Blick) baby.

She is later investigated at work in August 2019, with the governors and several other villagers believing that she was a negligent headteacher, who did not notice what was going on with colleague Maya Stepney (Louisa Clein), who was grooming her student Jacob Gallagher (Joe-Warren Plant). Jessie tries to explain herself at the meeting but is suspended by the governors and after drowning her sorrows in the pub and insulting several villagers, telling them what she thinks of them, Jessie decides she cannot go on, so she resigns, which causes even more tension in her marriage to Marlon. Later, Jessie is surprised to learn Ellis' dad, her ex-husband Al Chapman, is in business with Kim Tate. Though Jessie is skeptical of Al's intentions with Ellis, she ends up in bed with Al, which he quickly tells Marlon about. Having been offered a job in Dubai just prior to her fling with Al, Jessie opts to accept it after Marlon ends their marriage, and she makes a quick exit from Tall Trees in a cab. About a month later, Billy arranges a job in Dubai for Ellis to get him away from Al and so that he knows their mother will be with Ellis.

== Sebastian White ==
Sebastian White
- Emmerdale character
- Portrayed by: Lily Westmoreland (2017–2019); Opie Atkinson (2019)
- Duration: 2017–2019
- First appearance: Episode 7985; 9 November 2017
- Last appearance: Episode 8637; 1 November 2019
In-universe information
- Family: Sugden
- Father: Robert Sugden
- Mother: Rebecca White
- Stepfather: Aaron Dingle; Kev Townsend
- Grandfathers: Jack Sugden; Lawrence White
- Grandmothers: Pat Sugden; Sarah Sugden (adoptive)
- Uncles: Jackie Merrick; John Sugden; Andy Sugden (adoptive)
- Aunts: Chrissie White; Victoria Sugden; Sandie Merrick
- First cousins: Lachlan White; Harry Sugden; Sarah Sugden (adoptive); Jack Sugden (adoptive)
- Other relatives: Sam Pearson; Annie Sugden; Joe Sugden; Peggy Skilbeck; Janie Blakey; Sally Skilbeck; Sam Skilbeck

Sebastian White, played by Lily Westmoreland, made his first appearance on 9 November 2017. He is the son of Rebecca White (Emily Head) and Robert Sugden (Ryan Hawley). The character is portrayed by infant actress Lily. Head commented that Lily is well behaved on set and rarely cries.

Rebecca discovers she is pregnant following a one-night stand with former brother-in-law Robert; however, she also slept with boyfriend Ross Barton (Michael Parr) around the same time. Robert asks Rebecca to have an abortion, as he does not want a drunken mistake to ruin his relationship with partner Aaron Dingle (Danny Miller), but Rebecca cannot go through with it, so Robert has to tell Aaron the truth. Although furious initially, Aaron forgives Robert but after seeing a scan photo, Aaron struggles with the situation and breaks up with Robert. Rebecca goes into labour at the roadside, while Aaron tries to fix her car. Aaron gets Rebecca to hospital where she gives birth to a healthy baby boy, who is named Sebastian. Robert decides to leave the village, as he fears his son will turn out like him, but changes his mind after talking to Aaron. Robert vows to be the best father he can be and promises his son that he will not let him down.

However, the Whites learn that Robert had been planning to seize control of Home Farm. A series of conflicts between Robert and the Whites lead to Robert snatching Seb just as the family move to Australia. In a subsequent car chase, Lachlan steers the Whites' car into the path of a lorry, killing Lawrence and Chrissie. Rebecca is in a coma for a few weeks. When she wakes up, she agrees to allow Robert and Aaron custody of Seb, as her injuries from the crash mean she is incapable. However, she was held hostage by Lachlan after discovering that he caused the car crash. Robert doesn't want his son to grow up without his mother and decides to find her because it haunted Robert especially when his mother Pat Sugden (Helen Weir) died when he was four months old and didn't want Seb to go through the same. Rebecca was found alive, although is seen to be suffering from the trauma of her captivity and consequently struggled to reconnect with him. When Rebecca moves to Liverpool with Ross, she convinces Robert to let him take Seb with her, providing that he and Aaron have joint custody. When Robert is arrested for murder, Rebecca decides to no longer let Aaron have custody of Sebastian. No paternity test was ever taken to show his biological father.

== Dee Dee ==
Dee Dee
- Emmerdale character
- Portrayed by: Mia Gibson-Reed
- Duration: 2017, 2019
- First appearance: Episode 7998; 24 November 2017
- Last appearance: Episode 8662; 28 November 2019
In-universe information
- Father: Charlie Willis
- Mother: Bernice Blackstock
- Half-sisters: Gabby Thomas
- Grandfathers: Rodney Blackstock
- Grandmothers: Diane Sugden
- Aunts: Nicola King
- Nephews: Thomas Tate
- First cousins: Angelica King

Dee Dee, played by Mia Gibson-Reed, made her first appearance on 24 November 2017. She is the daughter of Bernice Blackstock (Samantha Giles) and the half-sister of Gabby Thomas (Rosie Bentham). Gibson-Reed's casting as Dee Dee was announced in November 2017 and it was confirmed she would be appearing for a guest stint. After Bernice and Gabby make out that Bernice has an extravagant life, Bernice "has to keep the charade going" in front of Dee Dee despite being "uncomfortable with lying to Dee Dee." Bernice wants to confess, but avoid disappointment, especially when Bernice witnesses Dee Dee getting on with Gabby and Bernice is put "in a panic" when Dee Dee "makes it clear how long she plans to stay."

When Bernice struggles with motherhood following the birth of Gabby, she breaks up with her husband and Gabby's father Ashley Thomas (John Middleton), and moves to Brighton after taking a job. Bernice wants Gabby to live with her, but she realises Gabby has a strong bond with Ashley. Dee Dee is born on her grandmother, Diane Blackstock's (Elizabeth Estensen) wedding day to Jack Sugden (Clive Hornby). When Bernice and Charlie break up, Bernice returns to Emmerdale and Dee Dee moves to Australia with her father. When Ashley dies, Bernice and Gabby go to Australia and Gabby decides to remain with Dee Dee, but later returns home.

Dee Dee arrives unannounced in Emmerdale and reunites with Bernice, Gabby and Diane. Bernice and Gabby admit to Diane they exaggerated their life to make it seem glamorous to Dee Dee. Dee Dee meets her aunt, Nicola King (Nicola Wheeler), and Nicola encourages Bernice to keep money from a betting slip from one of Bernice's clients who recently died and was Lydia Hart's (Karen Blick) distant cousin in order to keep up the pretence she is rich. Bernice rents a Bentley from Debbie Dingle (Charley Webb) and buys gifts for Dee Dee and Gabby. Diane suggests Bernice admits the truth when Dee Dee says she enjoys spending time with Bernice. Bernice contemplates telling the truth until Dee Dee announces Charlie gave her permission to stay for Christmas. When Dee Dee and Bernice return from a holiday, she comes clean to Dee Dee that she is not rich and the money is Lydia's inheritance. Lydia is initially furious when Dee Dee lets slip about the inheritance and Dee Dee insists they return everything they bought. Dee Dee tells Bernice that she is returning to Charlie as he wants her home.

Dee Dee returns to the village two years later when Bernice's partner, Liam Cavanagh (Jonny McPherson), contacts her. She surprises Bernice, and explains that she wants to attend her wedding to Liam. However, when it is revealed that her father has been in a car accident and is in critical condition, Dee Dee returns to Australia alongside Bernice.

== Other characters ==
| Date(s) | Character | Actor | Circumstances |
|---|---|---|---|
| 13 January | Darren | Chris Jack | Darren is a stripper who performs in The Woolpack. Rhona Goskirk (Zoe Henry) rubs baby oil onto Darren's chest and gives him her business card when she misinterprets his innuendo about snakes. Darren later calls Rhona and she sets him straight. |
| 19 January | Sasha | Sophie Wardlow | Sasha meets with Robert Sugden (Ryan Hawley) and Rebecca White (Emily Head) at Home Farm. She is impressed with the property and how flexible Robert and Rebecca are willing to be with the dates. She kisses Robert on her way out. |
| 10 February – 30 March | Grace | Lisa Howard | Grace is the manager of Turnfield Court Care Home. She assures Ashley Thomas's (John Middleton) wife Laurel (Charlotte Bellamy) that it is normal for him to bond with fellow dementia sufferer Maggie (Philippa Howell). Laurel asks Grace to keep Maggie away from Ashley when they kiss. Ashley's daughter Gabby Thomas (Rosie Bentham) notices Ashley has lost weight, but Grace tells Laurel that the staff have not noticed anything. However, Laurel finds food in Ashley's dressing gown pocket and tells Grace. She also says that Ashley and Maggie can spend time together. |
| 16–17 February | Linda McIntyre | Natasha Joseph | Linda is Kyle Wyatt's (Huey Quinn) case worker, who comes to check on his living situation following the death of his guardian Joanie Dingle (Denise Black). Linda overhears Zak Dingle (Steve Halliwell) and Lisa Dingle (Jane Cox) arguing, and she asks them how they are coping with Kyle. Zak admits that he feels like he is failing Kyle due to his age and health issues. He insists Linda talk to Kyle's grandmother Kerry Wyatt (Laura Norton), who is happy to look after Kyle. However, Faith Dingle (Sally Dexter) tells Linda that Kerry started a fire and had her own daughter placed in foster care. Kerry loses her temper and threatens to run away with Kyle. Linda takes Kyle into care, but Zak and Lisa contact her and decide they want Kyle to live with them after all. Linda tells them Kyle is with a foster family and they should apply for a temporary parental order. |
| 20–21 February | Eileen | Zoe Lambert | Eileen accuses her former stepmother Faith Dingle (Sally Dexter) of killing her father, Brian, for his money. Chas Dingle (Lucy Pargeter) asks for an explanation and Eileen says Faith poisoned her father. Faith tells her that Brian died after taking Viagra on top of his weak heart. Faith pushes Eileen and they are separated by police officers. |
| 6 March–11 August | Josh Crowther | Conner Chapman | After entering the café, Josh attempts to get to the cakes and Brenda Walker (Lesley Dunlop) slaps his hand away. Josh tells her he has brittle bones, and Jamie backs him up. Liv Flaherty (Isobel Steele) tells Brenda the pair are lying, and they insult her half-brother Aaron Dingle (Danny Miller), who is in prison. Noah Dingle (Jack Downham) stands up for Liv, but Josh suggests Liv's mother was aware that her father sexually abused Aaron. Josh and Jamie leave, but return a week later. Josh flirts with Gabby Thomas (Rosie Bentham), while Jamie distracts Liv. Gabby and Liv skip school to spend time with Josh and Jamie, and they begin drinking vodka at Gabby's house. Josh and Gabby have sex, and her stepmother Laurel Thomas (Charlotte Bellamy) throws Josh out when she learns what they have done. Josh and Jamie later steal an erotic novel written by Tracy Metcalfe (Amy Walsh) and torment her stepson Jacob Gallagher (Joe-Warren Plant) by reading it out loud. They asks Jacob to steal money from David's, the farm store, but he refuses and Josh threatens him. They later return with their faces covered and tell Eric Pollard (Chris Chittell) to open the till. Dan Spencer (Liam Fox) hides and watches them. Josh and Jamie empty the till and when Eric refuses to tell them where the safe is, he is attacked with a baseball bat. Eric pulls Josh's scarf down and Dan sees his face. Josh later threatens Dan with a knife, and Dan retracts his statement. |
| 6 March–9 August | Jamie Halstead | Jake Hayward | |
| 10 March | Kev Parker | John Catterall | Kev is a Hotten Courier journalist and a friend of Harriet Finch (Katherine Dow Blyton), who meets him at The Woolpack. She asks Kev to help provide publicity for a Narcotics Anonymous meeting she is organising in the village hall. Harriet introduces Kev to Jai Sharma (Chris Bisson) and Moira Barton (Natalie J. Robb). Kev reckons the editor will put something in the local services page, and Moira offers to tell him about her daughter Holly's (Sophie Powles) story. Before Kev leaves, the local choir perform hoping to get some publicity. |
| 17 March | Anthea | Sarah Conway-Jackson | Anthea is part of a hen party who comes to Beauty & Bernice. Bernice Blackstock (Samantha Giles) tells the party about her gay former husbands, leading Carly Hope (Gemma Atkinson) to step in and play games with the women. Anthea compliments Carly on her hosting skills and offers her a join at a resort in Málaga. Carly takes Anthea's business card, and later contacts her about the job. |
| 18 July | Lilly | Carla Woodcock | A friend of Sarah Sugden's (Katie Hill) who attends her party at the Woolpack. She is underage but gets access to alcohol for herself and friends, which gets the party shut down. |
