= Nell Fairfax =

Fictional Emmerdale character

- Emmerdale character
- Portrayed by: Scarlett Archer
- First appearance: 30 March 2017
- Last appearance: 12 September 2017
In-universe information
- Other names: Holly

Nell Fairfax is a fictional character from the British soap opera Emmerdale, played by Scarlett Archer. She made her first appearance on 30 March 2017. Archer was grateful to join the soap opera and was able to quit her job as a waitress, although she found the Emmerdale filming schedule terrifying. She enjoyed playing Nell due to the character being different from herself. Nell was introduced as a recovering drug addict who Jai Sharma (Chris Bisson) meets at a Narcotics Anonymous meeting. Nell reminds Jai of his former girlfriend Holly Barton (Sophie Powles), who died of a drug overdose. Jai tries to help Nell and he becomes her rock. Nell later moves in with him and they start a relationship, much to the disapproval of Jai's family. Nell later tells Jai that she has a daughter who was taken into care; Jai encourages Nell to track Rosie down, but Nell then reveals that Rosie has died and supposedly takes him to her funeral.

In July 2017, it was announced that Archer would be leaving the soap at the end of Nell's storyline. Nell's exit storyline begins when Nell tells Jai that she is pregnant, which he is shocked by. He decides to propose to Nell, but he ends up discovering that Nell has been conning him since they met. Nell then confirms that she is not a drug addict, she does not have a daughter who died and she is not pregnant, and it is revealed that Nell searched Jai out after reading about Holly's death in the hopes that she could make him happier. Archer revealed that she had known about the twist since she joined the soap and that she had tried to give clues to show that Nell was lying by making her emotional scenes seem not too real, which led to people telling Archer that she was a bad actress. Archer kept the reveal a secret from her family and friends as she did not want to spoil the surprise for them. Nell's final episode aired on 12 September 2017, which involves Nell leaving the village and beginning to con someone else.

Viewers were suspicious of Nell since the beginning of her stint, which Archer believed was due to the fact that Nell came out of nowhere. Critics reported how viewers were unsure if Nell could be trusted. Critics were suspicious of Nell and noted the similarities between Nell and Holly. Some viewers speculated that Nell could have contributed to Holly's death, whilst others theorised that Nell could be the secret daughter of established character Emma Barton (Gillian Kearney). Viewers were conflicted of Nell's claim of her daughter dying, with some believing the character and others thinking that it was fake. Following the exposure of Nell's lies, some viewers were shocked but others felt happy that her con had been exposed. Fans had theorised that Nell had tracked Jai down after reading the article about Holly's death, which was later revealed to be correct.

== Casting ==
Scarlett Archer made her first appearance as Nell Fairfax on 30 March 2017. The character had been revealed earlier that month in spoiler promotions. Archer was grateful for being cast in the role, explaining, "It feels like a bit of a dream at the moment – I need someone to pinch me! When I was working before, I was taking a few days out to film something and then going back to my day job". Archer was able to quit her role as a waitress when she was cast on the soap, which she found "amazing". Archer had previously worked with her Emmerdale colleague Danny Miller, who plays Aaron Dingle, on Jamaica Inn. Archer believed that working on Emmerdale was amazing and was grateful that her colleagues had been "lovely" and supportive, although she called the filming schedule "quite terrifying". She enjoyed playing Nell due to the character being so different from herself, as she is more grounded and confident than Nell. Archer had watched Emmerdale before joining the cast, and she described her aunt as a "diehard" fan. Archer believed that she looks different to Nell in real and thus tends to not get spotted often in public by fans, though she joked that a fan would recognise her if she was hungover.

In July 2017, it was reported that Archer would be leaving Emmerdale at the conclusion of Nell's storyline with Jai. The news came following the announcement of other cast members departing the soap opera. A source revealed, "Scarlett came in as Nell for a very specific storyline. She was always leaving at the end of her current contract and viewers will not be disappointed with her exit. Nell's departure will have a massive impact on Jai. He's only just got his life back on track so her exit could well send him spiralling out of control once again. He's managed to stay off drugs all these months but losing Nell could spark a relapse". However, an Emmerdale spokesperson told Digital Spy that they would not comment on the storyline and Nell's exit storyline would be kept a secret from viewers.

== Development ==
=== Introduction ===
Nell first appears at a Narcotics Anonymous meeting that established character Jai Sharma (Chris Bisson) is attending. Jai has been struggling with addiction and grieving of the death of his girlfriend Holly Barton (Sophie Powles), who died of a drug overdose, and when he sees Nell he is shocked at her resemblance to Holly and how similar the two women's stories are. Jai tries to befriend Nell and gives her his jacket as she is cold, but she ends up stealing his wallet. Bisson explained that Jai is in a "sensitive place" and his feelings about Holly are heightened at the meeting, and that he is being quite revealing about his feelings when Nell comes in; the actor added Nell's story resonates with Jai and combined with her looks "there's definitely something there and a resemblance to Holly". Bisson revealed that Jai is hurt that Nell steals his wallet after he is so nice to her but takes it "well", explaining, "He understands Nell's situation and how addicts are. Rather than calling the police, he takes her out for something to eat and he offers her help. By the end of that first meeting, Jai is hopeful that Nell will come back to the next NA meeting so she stays clean." Bisson was glad that Emmerdale was exploring Jai's grief and praised the soap for their commitment to exploring addiction as he believed that it is important to show that "addiction problems don't just disappear and every day can be a struggle".

=== Relationship with Jai ===
Jai tells Holly that she reminds him of someone that he used to know and that he wishes that he had helped, and Nell "takes this opportunity" to reveal that she is currently staying on a friend's sofa. Jai's brother-in-law and former rival Rakesh Kotecha (Pasha Bocarie) warns Jai that he should be wary of Nell. Jai is a "rock" for Nell, who is struggling with poverty and addiction issues, and his help is transformative to Nell, with the two supporting each other through difficult times. Bisson liked working with Archer and praised her for being excellent in scenes and hitting the ground running. He added that he and Archer had worked hard to get the story about Nell and Jai's relationship right. Archer believed that Nell was initially craving Jai's support as she was in a bad place at the NA meeting and Jai was very kind to her, and she later fell for him.

Nell attends the birthday party of Rishi's niece, Amba Metcalfe (Ava Jayasinghe), where she wears an outfit that makes her the "spitting image" of Holly. Archer explained that this is not deliberate as Nell has never met Holly, and that Nell has her "own sort of Bohemian style" which is similar to Holly. Amba ends up being placed in "danger" after playing with Nell's bag and finds her prescription drugs. Amba plays with them and everyone is unsure whether she has taken any and the blame falls on Nell, who is worried that Jai will cut ties with her. Archer believed that it was not Nell's fault as she did not leave them lying around, and called it an "accident". Archer explained that Jai is the only person who has been there for Nell but he worries that she has returned to taking drugs, and Nell is in a "desperate situation" and needs his help as she has nowhere else to go. Jai's father, Rishi Sharma (Bhasker Patel), is shocked when he discovers a homeless Nell sleeping in his factory, so Jai promises to stand by Nell and take her in from the street despite his family's reservations. Archer explained that Jai's kindness is very "surprising" to Nell and she is very grateful. Archer explained that Nell sleeping in the factory was a "last resort" as she was discharged from hospital with prescription drugs to help with her addiction due to there not being much else that the doctors can do to help her. Jai's sister and Amba's mother, Priya Sharma (Fiona Wade), is not happy about Nell moving in and is worried about how living with an addict may affect Amba, but Jai will not let this stop him from helping Nell.

Archer explained that Priya shows Nell a lot of hostility and is suspicious of her intentions, but that Nell really wants to be accepted by Priya and the whole family as Jai is the first person to show Nell "this sort of kindness" in a long time. The actress was unsure of how Nell feels around Jai, as whilst she tries to kiss him, she believed that it was Nell being overwhelmed by his kindness. Speaking to Lorraine, Bisson hinted that Jay could be headed for disaster, explaining that Nell and Jai "have come together because of what's happened to them in the past, but the audience are thinking that there is going to be trouble ahead." However, Archer explained that Nell is genuinely troubled and struggling but is trying her best, but also believed that Nell and Jai do not "look the best when you put them on paper". Archer also explained that Nell has to contend with Jai's family, especially as his sister is protective of Jai and thus there is a lot of "hostility" between her and Nell, which is an environment that Nell finds difficult. However, Bisson later told Inside Soap that Nell likes Jai's family environment as she has never had that and now she feels secured, which is important to her.

Nell later moves into Jai's home and the pair develop a close bond and romance. Nell ends up taking Jai's baby daughter, Eliza Sharma (Kyrena Robinson), when she is left unattended, which infuriates Eliza's mother Megan Macey (Gaynor Faye). Nell apologises several times and explains that she only took her to bring to Jai as she was left alone. Nell and Jai rebuild their friendship and Nell reveals that she is the mother of a young girl named Rosie. She explains that Rose was taken into care after she took heroin for the second time, and reveals that that is why she did not call the police about Eliza, as she did not want social services to take Eliza away. Nell reveals that she blames herself and Jai apologises for doubting her and promises to support her.

=== Rosie ===
Jai is happy when Nell arranges to speak to social services about finding Rosie and he books her a pampering session so that she can feel confident and make a good first impression. He later speaks to Holly's mother Moira Barton (Natalie J. Robb) about moving on from Holly. Bisson explained that Jai does want to move on feels that he has to explain himself to Moira when she sees him and Nell together as he does not want her to think that he has forgotten about Holly or that his feelings have changed. Nell overhears their conversation and packs her bags and decides to leave the village after misinterpreting Jai's feelings. Emmerdale spoilers suggested that Jai could lose Nell "for good". Bisson explained that Jai is upset that Nell has misunderstood what he was saying to Moira, and believed that if Nell had heard the whole conversation "she would probably understand that Jai's intentions were honest and that he was actually being very open with Moira about his feelings towards Holly and never forgetting her".

When Priya accuses Nell of spying on her and Pete Barton (Anthony Quinlan), Nell breaks down and tells Priya that she found out in her meeting with social services that Rosie had died suddenly whilst in care. Jai comforts Nell, who blames herself for Rosie's death. Nell tells Jai that she is unsure of whether to go to the funeral as she never go to know her daughter, but Jai convinces her to go and speak to Rosie's adopted family. However, when they go the service, Nell insists from watching it from afar and asks to leave before they can speak to anyone.

=== Pregnancy news ===
Jai suspects that Nell is taking drugs again when she begins acting strangely. Nell later tells Jai that she is pregnant with his baby, which she is happy about, but Jai "freaks out" and appears to be "terrified" at the news. Rishi tells Nell that Jai is having doubts about the baby. Nell lashes out and storms off after being hurt by Jai's "harsh reaction" when he tells her they need to have a serious discussion about the situation. Nell is found by Moira and she explains that she sees the pregnancy as a second chance of motherhood, and Moira comforts her. Jai regrets his actions and realises that he wants Nell and the baby after all, so he goes to buy her an engagement ring to prove it to her. It was teased by Inside Soap that the shopping trip would make Jai's decision "a lot clearer". Archer believed that as Nell has had a difficult life, she has always dreamed of having a baby and a big wedding. She added that she believes that Nell is "quite traditional" in that sense and that now everything is falling into place for Nell, which Archer called "exciting". Meanwhile, Bisson explained that Jai has to catch up emotionally to make the decision of marrying Nell and has to come to the idea of marriage quicker than he would like to.

=== Exposure of con ===
In September 2017, it was revealed that Nell had been conning Jai for months. Whilst shopping for the ring, Jai is startled when he discovers that there is generic picture of "Rosie" in all of the photo frames. An alarmed Jai investigates further and visits the church where "Rosie's" funeral was, where he learns that the funeral had nothing to do with Nell as the child's birth mother was at the graveside. Jai then goes through Nell's belongings, where he discovers numerous newspaper cuttings about Nell, prompting him to realise that Nell is not a recovering drug addict and that her daughter did not die, and that he was her intended target. Jai also finds the article about Holly that had been published just before Nell's arrival in her belongings. Fans had previously speculated that Nell could have read the article about Holly and impersonated her deliberately. Jai drags Nell away from her photography showcase and they two have a tense showdown, which leads to Nell admitting to never having taken drugs, not having had a child and not being pregnant, which devastates Jai. After she goes to hug him, Jai pushes Nell and she hits her head. A wounded Nell continues to profess her love for Jai, who storms out after finding out she is not pregnant. Rishi and Megan also find out the truth when they arrive. Distraught at her betrayal, Jai throws away the engagement ring he bought.

"[Nell is] completely crazy and seriously troubled - people better watch out! Nell's a fantasist, a deeply troubled person. I wouldn't say she's evil but she's got serious mental health issues and has done some very bad things. She's been telling all these lies which is a massive shock, this whole time she's been planning everything. She's never taken drugs, she even faked an overdose, she's never had a child called Rosie and she's not even pregnant - it's all a fantasy."

— Archer on Nell being exposed (2017)

The twist had not been revealed to viewers prior to the broadcast, and Archer admitted that she had found it difficult to keep it secret. The actress had known about Nell's secrets from her first day of filming and the rest of the crew and cast found out along the way, with Archer calling it "a nice surprise for everyone". She had kept the secret from her family and friends as they had been enjoying Nell's story and did not want to spoil it for them. She had planned to invite her sisters over so that they could watch the reveal together. Archer revealed that she had tried to give viewers clues to the twist by making Nell's emotional scenes not look "too real" as "It's nice to have those little inklings that something isn't quite right". She explained, "I am acting as someone who is acting, so there have been scenes where Nell is meant to be upset and crying and we can kind of tell that they're crocodile tears". She added that Nell's behaviour "has been a little off from the beginning" and some fans had told Archer that she was a bad actress and that Nell was a bad mother, which she found hard as she could not say to them 'wait and see what happens as there's a pay off'". Archer added that portraying the storyline "has been an absolute blessing and having known that this twist was coming all along, it's been so exciting!"

Archer sympathised with Jai, explaining, "It's a horrible, horrible thing to go through and have someone lie through an entire relationship. I think the fallout with Jai is going to be massive". Archer also teased that there would be more "shocks and twists" coming and an insight into Nell's mind and why she may have done this prior to Nell's exit, which aired the week after the revelation. Archer teased that the reveal was just the beginning, which she hinted would be "bigger" and very dark. Speaking about the reaction from fans, Archer said, "I hope fans will understand why she's done all this but I think they will probably just think she's an utter terror and a terrible human. I'm worried how strongly people might feel about it! But it's a terrible thing, to be fair, so people have the right to be angry! I guess if they are really angry then I have done my job properly!" Archer also teased that Nell would interact with Moira and that it would involve her connection to Holly. She added, "Moira doesn't know any of what happened so there is definitely going to be some interaction there".

Jai later tells his father that he wants to "do the right thing" and talk to Nell rather than getting her arrested for fraud. However, Jai is then arrested for pushing and injuring Nell. Nell is also seen looking at Moira when she is working alone on her farm. Nell later drops her assault allegations against Jai; the pair talk and she explains to him that she had cancer when she was younger and that when she recovered, she felt that she failed at everything and only felt that her family loved her when she was unwell. This resulted in Nell "completely" losing her way and fell into a "dark habit" of making up "bizarre lies" and seeking out people that she had read about in the news in the hopes of "giving their sad stories happier endings", which is why Nell got involved with Jai after reading about Holly. Jai is hopeful that Nell will get some professional help when she agrees to visit her mum. However, it is revealed that Nell has actually found another stranger to target with more lies, as she claims that she is an addict who knew the stranger's daughter before she died. This occurs in Archer's final episode as Nell, which aired on 12 September 2017.

== Storylines ==
Jai Sharma (Chris Bisson) meets Nell at a NA meeting in the village hall. Jai is shocked by Nell's resemblance and similar story to his ex-girlfriend Holly Barton (Sophie Powles), who died of a drug overdose the previous year. After the meeting, Nell thanks Jai for being encouraging, and he offers Nell his coat when he notices her shivering. He finds out that Nell has taken his wallet and confronts her. After she gives it back, Jai takes Nell out for lunch and they talk. The following day, Nell tracks Jai down and asks to borrow money, but Jai refuses as he cannot trust her. Weeks later, Nell reaches out to Jai after being hospitalised from an overdose. Jai collects her from the hospital and allows her to stay at his home. Jai's sister Priya Sharma (Fiona Wade) is not happy about this as she is worried about Nell being around her daughter Amba Metcalfe (Ava Jayasinghe), so Nell leaves. Jai offers Nell a job and to pay for her to stay at a B&B, which she accepts after he tells her that he wants to help her as he could not help Holly.

Nell finds Jai's daughter Eliza Sharma (Kyrena Robinson) alone and takes her to the factory, which infuriates her mother Megan Macey (Gaynor Faye) as she believes that Nell abducted the baby. Jai talks to Nell and she reveals that she has a daughter, Rosie, who was taken into care due to her drug addiction, and that she had taken Eliza as she did not want social services to take her away from Jai for being on her own. Jai and Nell begin a relationship, which is disapproved of by Jai's friends and family. Megan initially bans Jai from seeing Nell but later changes her mind. Jai invites Nell to live with him again after he finds her slitting her wrists. Nell overhears Jai telling Holly's mother Moira Barton (Natalie J. Robb) that she has baggage, not leaving that he had told her how much he loves Nell, and tries to leave Emmerdale, but she changes her mind and they make up. Jai is proud of Nell when she contacts social services to see Rose again, but she later tells him that she has been told that Rose has died. Nell takes Jai to a funeral, which she says is Rose's, but they watch from a distance and Nell does not talk to anyone there.

Nell tells Jai that she is pregnant and he is initially not happy, which upsets Nell. Jai realises that he does want Nell and the baby and goes to buy a wedding ring to prove his commitment. However, whilst shopping he sees a picture of "Rosie" in the photo frames. Jai investigates and goes through Nell's things, where he finds newspaper clippings and articles about Holly. He confronts Nell and finds out that Nell has been lying about everything; she does not have a drug addict, she does not have a daughter that died and she is not pregnant. Jai is devastated and Nell insists that they should be together. Jai ends up pushing Nell when she goes near him and she tells the police and Moira that he assaulted her, which leads to him being arrested. Moira finds out that she is lying when she realises that Nell does not have any syringe scars. Jai is released when Nell tells the police the truth. Nell confides to Jai that she had cancer when she was young and she felt that her family loved her only when she was unwell, which led to her developing a habit of seeking out unhappy people that she saw in the news in the hopes of giving them happier endings. Jai agrees to drop Nell off at her mother's so that she can get some help. However, it is revealed that Nell has actually approached another woman and is claiming to be a friend of her deceased daughter, indicating that Nell is conning someone else. When the woman asks for her name, Nell says that she is called "Holly".

== Reception ==
"Canny Priya's got the measure of [Nell], and we think she's got every reason to be suspicious of the complicated newcomer – Nell's got wrong'un written all over her. Now that Jai's promised to look after Nell following her revelation she had her baby daughter taken off her, the cynic in us is wondering whether she's going to end up dragging Jai back to the dark side with her? Two recovering addicts together could be another recipe for disaster."

— Laura Morgan from Digital Spy on Nell (2017)

Discussing Nell's first appearance, Daniel Kilkelly from Digital Spy called Nell a "troublesome newcomer" and questioned whether she could be trusted and whether Jai had underestimated her. He added, "Emmerdale fans may be left wondering whether this new character can really be trusted" after Nell tells Jai that she is staying with a friend. Following Nell's debut, Kilkelly reported how viewers were "suspicious" that Nell was impersonating Holly deliberately, with some fans speculating on Twitter that Nell had read the article about Holly and was trying to con Jai. Kilkelly commented how Nell's story at the meeting was "eerily similar" to Holly's and he believed that Jai felt "compelled" to help her. Laura Heffernan from Inside Soap also noted how Nell showed up right after the article about Holly was published. Kate White from Inside Soap wrote that Nell's history was a "mystery" but believed that there was "no doubt" that Jai was drawn to her because she is the "spitting image" of Holly. She added how it had been a "bumpy journey" for Nell and Jai since they met, and believed that it was not a surprise that Priya was unimpressed by Jai's decision to take Nell in. Discussing Nell's pregnancy news months later, Tyler from the same magazine wrote that the "prophets of doom" would be occupying the couple as their relationship would step up several gears.

Archer noted that she stopped checking Twitter for the opinions of fans on Nell as she would drive herself "crazy"; she believed that most fans were nice in person, but there were a few online who were not very nice. Prior to the reveal, fans had told Archer that she was a bad actress and that Nell was a bad mother. Archer was worried about how fans would react to the character after her con was revealed. Laura-Jayne Tyler from Inside Soap noted how there was a lot of resistance from characters and fans when Jai got together with "troubled" Nell. Archer believed that fans had been suspicious of Nell since her debut as she "seemed to have come from nowhere". Tyler later reported how fans felt "protective" of Jai regarding his situation with Nell, which Bisson found fascinating due to Jai previously having been a villain. In May 2017, Duncan Lindsay from Metro reported how fans had shown on their comments section and social media accounts that they were "really growing to like Nell", but also added that some fans were convinced that Nell was trying to con Jai and "up to no good". He also called Jai and Nell's romance storyline "fascinating", writing, "We're all desperate for it to be the next big soap love story – how nice would it be to prove all of our own suspicions and preconceptions wrong and for Emmerdale's Nell Fairfax to be genuine as she and Jai Sharma pursue a romance?" Duncan also called Nell "mysterious".

Laura Morgan from Digital Spy included Nell and Jai on her list of "9 Emmerdale characters to watch out for in 2017", and believed that Jai was "going to live to regret going all Good Samaritan by inviting troubled Nell to live under his roof". In April 2017, Daniel Kilkelly from the same website called the scenes where Nell tells Jai about Rose "emotional" and questioned, "Could it be that Nell really has been genuine all along?" Rianne Houghton from Digital Spy later reported how fans were divided after Nell told Jai that her daughter died, with some fans expressing sympathy for Nell whilst others questioned whether Rosie had ever existed at all. Houghton wrote, "While some fans felt genuinely sorry and 'heartbroken' for Nell, others were wary of trusting her version of events. Let the division commence". She added that Nell could not "exactly blame" fans for not believing her. Kilkelly from the same website noted how Nell's behaviour "did absolutely nothing to rule out the fan theory that she could be lying", noting especially how Nell watched from afar and did not want to speak to anyone. Kilkelly added, "With no on-screen proof that this funeral had anything to do with Nell, was this another tell-tale sign that she isn't being entirely honest with Jai? Or are we all reading way too much into it? As ever with Nell, we've been left with far more questions than answers..." Despite this, he noted how Nell had taken "centre stage" and called the scenes "heartbreaking". Following the news of that Archer would be leaving the soap, Ben Whisson from Digital Spy questioned how Jai would cope without Nell and wrote that her exit would "certainly come as a blow to Jai". He added, "The pair's rollercoaster relationship has seen plenty of drama up until now – so we can only imagine Nell's farewell will consist of more of the same". Kilkelly from the same website suspected that Nell and Jai would not have a happy ending due to Archer leaving the soap. Kaggie Hyland from Entertainment Daily also believed that Nell's departure would be "bad news" for Jai.

Following the reveal, Lindsay from Metro wrote that the "mysterious and slow burning saga of Nell Fairfax has just blown up without much warning", and noted how some fans were "left staggered by the mega twist" whilst others felt vindicated due to their initial suspicions of the character being "well placed". Laura Donaldson from OK! called the truth about Nell "horrifying". The Daily Mirror called Nell a "psychopath" and reported how fans were worried about what Nell would do to Moira. Sophie Dainty from Digital Spy called the reveal of Nell conning Jai one of Emmerdale's "biggest twists in a while". Catriona Rigney from OK! called Nell "troubled" and noted how Jai's "world came tumbling down around him" when Nell was exposed as a fake. Digital Spy's Houghton noted how viewers were "shocked (and kind of thrilled)" to see Nell's lies unravel, but added that they should have seen it coming due to Archer trying to give clues to Nell being a fantasist. Following the airing of her Nell's exit episode, she believed that "history is doomed to keep repeating itself" for "troubled" Nell due to the "final twist" of the episode. Metro's Lindsay believed that Archer had to play role ambiguously enough for the reveal to make sense whilst also not making it too obvious, which he believed Archer achieved "by showing just enough lack of emotion to make us click that something is amiss but while also showing a genuine affection from Nell to Jai that also made a love story outcome seem plausible". He also called Nell "complex and intriguing" and teased that the "excitement" was not yet over.

The Daily Mirror reported how viewers had speculated that Nell could be the secret daughter of established character Emma Barton (Gillian Kearney) due to Emma's own "dark streak". A writer also noted that fans "may already be reeling from the shock revelations" about Nell's lies. Writers from OK! and Closer reported how fans were theorising that Nell could have been the one to kill Holly by giving her the drugs that caused her overdose. Laura Donaldson from OK! added noted how a "sinister looking Nell" watching Moira on her farm during the "dramatic" episode. Writers from the Daily Record called the reveal a "shock twist" and wrote, "Moira had better watch out as Nell is completely unhinged". They also wrote how viewers had expressed online that they were worried for Moira due to Nell's connection to Holly and a "menacing looking Nell" watching Moira work on the farm.

Megan Davies from Digital Spy reported how viewers were "overjoyed" to see Nell be exposed, with some revealing on social media that they had been suspicious of the character from her debut. Davies wrote, "That's one way to turn a storyline around", and reported that viewers were "in awe of how the soap managed to turn her storyline around so quickly" and that some were worried for Moira. Davies also believed that Emmerdale had been dropping hints for months that Nell should not be trusted. Kilkelly called Nell's final scene "one final bizarre twist" and wrote, "Here we go again..." He added that Nell had missed out on getting the help that she "desperately" needs. However, Kilkelly noted that Nell had done the "right thing" by dropping her assault allegations against Jai. Emmerdale itself noted how it proved that Nell had learnt "Absolutely Nothing".
