= Scarlett Archer =

British actress (1989 or 1990)

- Born: 1989 or 1990 (age 35–36)
- Education: Arts Educational Schools
- Occupations: Actress; model
- Years active: 2013–present
- Television: Emmerdale

Scarlett Archer (born 1989 or 1990) is a British actress and model. She grew up in Borehamwood and used to live near the set of EastEnders. After graduating from Arts Educational Schools in 2012, she guest-starred in a 2013 episode of Call the Midwife and appeared in all three episodes of Jamaica Inn (2014). She subsequently appeared in Doctors (2015) and White Island (2016) and had a recurring role on The Royals (2016–18). In 2017, Archer had a regular role as Nell Fairfax on the British soap opera Emmerdale, which allowed her to quit her job as a waitress. After leaving the soap, she had leading roles in the stage tours of The Case of the Frightened Lady (2018) and The Lady Vanishes (2019). In 2024, Archer played Lady Windermere in the stage production of Lady Windermere's Fan. She has also appeared in the films Money Shot (2019), Finding Dad (2020) and The Last Days (2021), and has acted and modelled in several commercials.

== Early life ==
Scarlett Archer was born in 1989 or 1990. Her father was a manager for a timber company whilst her mother was a nursery nurse. Archer has four sisters. She grew up in Borehamwood, Hertfordshire; she and her family lived near the set of the British soap opera EastEnders and Archer would often act out scenes from the soap with her friends and sisters during the school breaks. She then trained at Arts Educational Schools in London, graduating from there in 2012.

== Career ==
Archer is an actress and model. She made her television debut when she guest-starred as Molly Brignall in the first episode of the second series of the British period drama Call the Midwife, which was initially broadcast on 20 January 2013. She then portrayed Beth in all three episodes of the British drama television series Jamaica Inn, which was originally broadcast between 21 and 23 April 2014. She then guest-starred on the BBC medical soap opera Doctors in "The Ring", an episode originally broadcast on 11 August 2015. She also played Gina in the 2016 comedy film White Island. Archer also had a recurring role on The Royals as Dame Simammon, which began in 2016. She has also modelled and acted for commercials in Switzerland, UAE, Czechia and the UK.

Archer later joined the cast of the British soap opera Emmerdale as Nell Fairfax, with her first appearance airing on 30 March 2017. Archer was a regular on the soap. Nell was introduced as a drug abuser that Jai Sharma (Chris Bisson) meets at a Narcotics Anonymous meeting, and the pair later begin a romance. Archer had previously worked with her Emmerdale colleague Danny Miller, who plays Aaron Dingle, on Jamaica Inn. Archer believed that working on Emmerdale was amazing and was grateful that her colleagues had been supportive, although she called the filming schedule "quite terrifying". She enjoyed playing Nell due to the character being so different from herself, as she is more grounded and confident than Nell. Archer had watched Emmerdale before joining the soap's cast and her aunt was described as being a "diehard" fan of it. Archer was able to quit her job as a waitress when she was cast in the soap as this was her first regular acting job; she said of this, "There have been so many times when I was crying into people's carbonara at work. You have to have thick skin. I don't think actors talk enough about how difficult it is and the amount of rejections you have to go through." Archer did not get spotted often in public by viewers as she looks different to Nell.

In July 2017, it was reported that Archer would be leaving Emmerdale at the conclusion of Nell's storyline with Jai, with it also being reported that Archer had always meant to leave at the end of her contract as she was only meant to be on the soap for a "very specific storyline". The news came following the announcement of other cast members departing the soap opera. Nell's final storyline saw her revealed as a psychopath and having lied about various aspects of her life, including being a drug addict, having a dead child and being pregnant. Of the storyline twist, Archer said, "It's been so hard keeping this secret, I knew this from the start but haven't told any of my family or friends because they've really been enjoying the storyline and I didn't want to ruin it for them". The actress added that she had been called a bad actress as she "wanted to play it so that when the twist came it wasn't out of the blue", and she did not want to spoil the surprise for viewers. She explained that she tried to not make Nell's emotional scenes too real as "I am acting as someone who is acting, so there have been scenes where Nell is meant to be upset and crying and we can kind of tell that they're crocodile tears". Archer's final episode as Nell aired on 12 September 2017.

In July 2018, it was announced that Archer had joined the cast of The Case of the Frightened Lady as part of its Autumn tour, which was performed in various theatres in the UK beginning in September of that year. Archer played Isla Crane, the "frightened lady", in the production; Nigel Chester from What's Good To Do praised the character for having "a mind of her own". Susan Welsh from The Press and Journal noted how Archer delivered "some ear-shattering screams at times" in the play. A writer from Sussex Express praised Archer for developing her character well and giving "some blood-curdling screams".

In 2019, Archer played the leading role of Iris in various runs of the stage adaptation of The Lady Vanishes, which was performed on tour in several theatres in England until 7 December 2019. A writer from Modish Male praised Archer's performance as "fantastic". Jack Buckley from Seen and Heard International had mixed opinions of Archer in the production, saying that she is a "strikingly glamorous woman but her squeaky high-pitched voice turns Iris from the high drama required into unintentional comedy. A pastiche of the role." Phil Lowe from East Midlands Theatre praised Archer and her co-star Nicholas Audsley for their performance in the production, writing, "Their combined concentrated enthusiasms and energies bring The Lady Vanishes to life and they really carry the piece with its integrated period drama and humour". Daniel Chambers from LondonTheatre1 praised Archer's performance, opining that her "interpretation of 'Iris' has much heart and authenticity. You fully believe in the character's confusion and desperation to find Miss Froy and she carries the plot so easily. You side with Iris instantly and she appears to be the voice of the audience throughout. Congratulations on bringing tenderness, energy and humour to Iris." Archer has also had roles in the films Finding Dad (2020) and The Last Days (2021), as well as the 2019 student short film Money Shot.

Archer played Lady Windermere in an adaptation of Lady Windermere's Fan, which ran at the Theatre Royal, Windsor from 20–24 February 2024, as part of the theatre's two weeks of "On-Air productions".

== Personal life ==
Archer enjoys bouldering and swimming in the Hampstead Heath Ponds. She attended Pride in London in 2017 with some of her Emmerdale colleagues. In November 2017, Archer wrote on Twitter that she had been left in tears after being sexually harassed by a man on the London Underground. Archer added, "I didn't have the guts to say anything. I just took it. Then cried. Like too many women. I'm glad we're getting angry" and she acknowledged that men had also gone through this as well, adding, "It's just heartbreaking because [it] all [comes] down to respecting your fellow humans". Archer was encouraged by the British Transport Police to phone their helpline in response to her posts.

== Acting credits ==
=== Filmography ===
Year	Title	Role	Notes	Ref.
2013	Call the Midwife	Molly Brignall	1 episode (Series 2, Episode 1)	
2014	Jamaica Inn	Beth	3 episodes	
2015	Doctors	Abbie Stanfield	1 episode ("The Ring")	
2016	White Island	Gina	Comedy film	
2016–18	The Royals	Dame Sinammon	Recurring role (4 episodes)	
2017	Emmerdale	Nell Fairfax	Regular role	
2019	Money Shot	Courtney	Student short film	
2020	Finding Dad	Emily	Film	
2021	The Last Days	Cor	Film	

=== Theatre ===
Year	Production	Role	Venue(s)	Ref.
2018	The Case of the Frightened Lady	Isla Crane	Various (UK tour)	
2019	The Lady Vanishes	Iris	Various (UK tour)	
2024	Lady Windermere's Fan	Lady Windermere	Theatre Royal, Windsor	
