= Empire's Children =

British history documentary by Channel 4

- Genre: History and documentary
- Presented by: Richard Armitage
- Starring: Diana Rigg; Adrian Lester; Shobna Gulati; Chris Bisson; Jenny Eclair; David Steel
- Original language: English

Original release
- Network: Channel 4
- Release: 2007 – 2007

Empire's Children is a 2007 six-part history documentary narrated by Richard Armitage and created by Channel 4. Each episode follows a British celebrity as they trace their family history across the British Empire.

The celebrities featured included actress Diana Rigg, director Adrian Lester, actress Shobna Gulati, actor Chris Bisson, comedian Jenny Eclair, and politician David Steel. The show was produced by Wall to Wall and Illumina.

== Release ==
The premiere of the first episode was watched by 1.9 million viewers and the final episode reached 1.1 million.

A companion book for the documentary was published in 2007 called Empire’s Children: Trace Your Family History Across the World.

== Reception ==
According to one academic, the show can be viewed through the lens of the rise in genealogy subject media during the 2000s.

Empire's Children was the winner of the Y Design award's "community award" category at the London Design Festival. The show was also nominated by the Royal Television Society for their 2007 Innovation Award.
