= British Soap Award for Best Actor =

Former annual British TV award

- Country: United Kingdom
- First award: 1999
- Final award: 2019

Highlights
- Most wins: Danny Miller (3)
- Most nominations: Danny Dyer; Shane Richie; Jack P. Shepherd (all 4)

The British Soap Award for Best Actor was an award presented annually by the British Soap Awards from its inception in 1999 until 2019. Alongside Best Actress, the award was voted for by the public. EastEnders is the most awarded soap in this category, with ten wins. Emmerdale actor Danny Miller is the most awarded actor, with three wins. In 2022, it was announced that the category had been replaced with the award for Best Leading Performer. The final winner of the award was Hollyoaks actor Gregory Finnegan.

== Winners and nominees ==
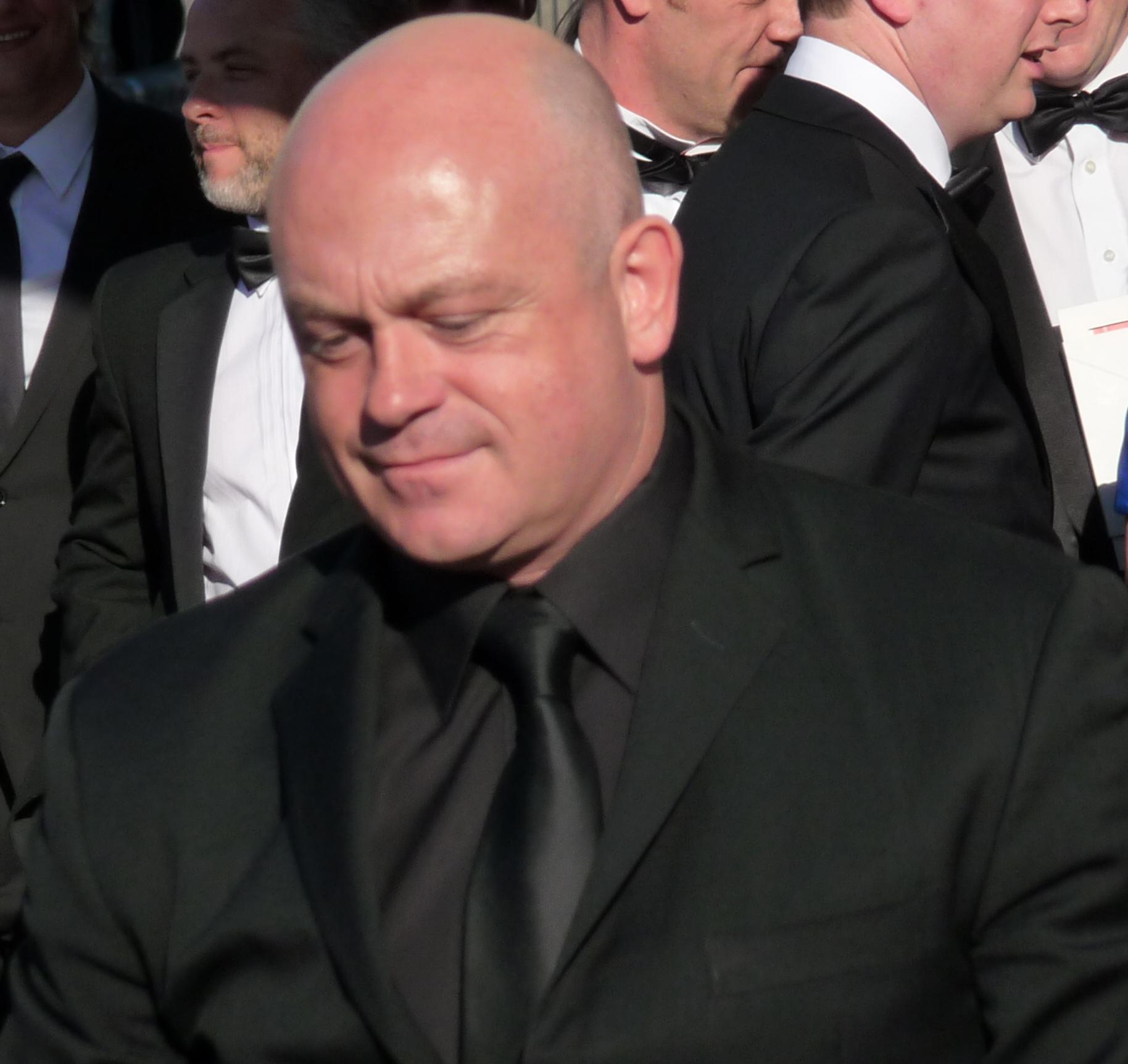
1999 and 2006 winner Ross Kemp.

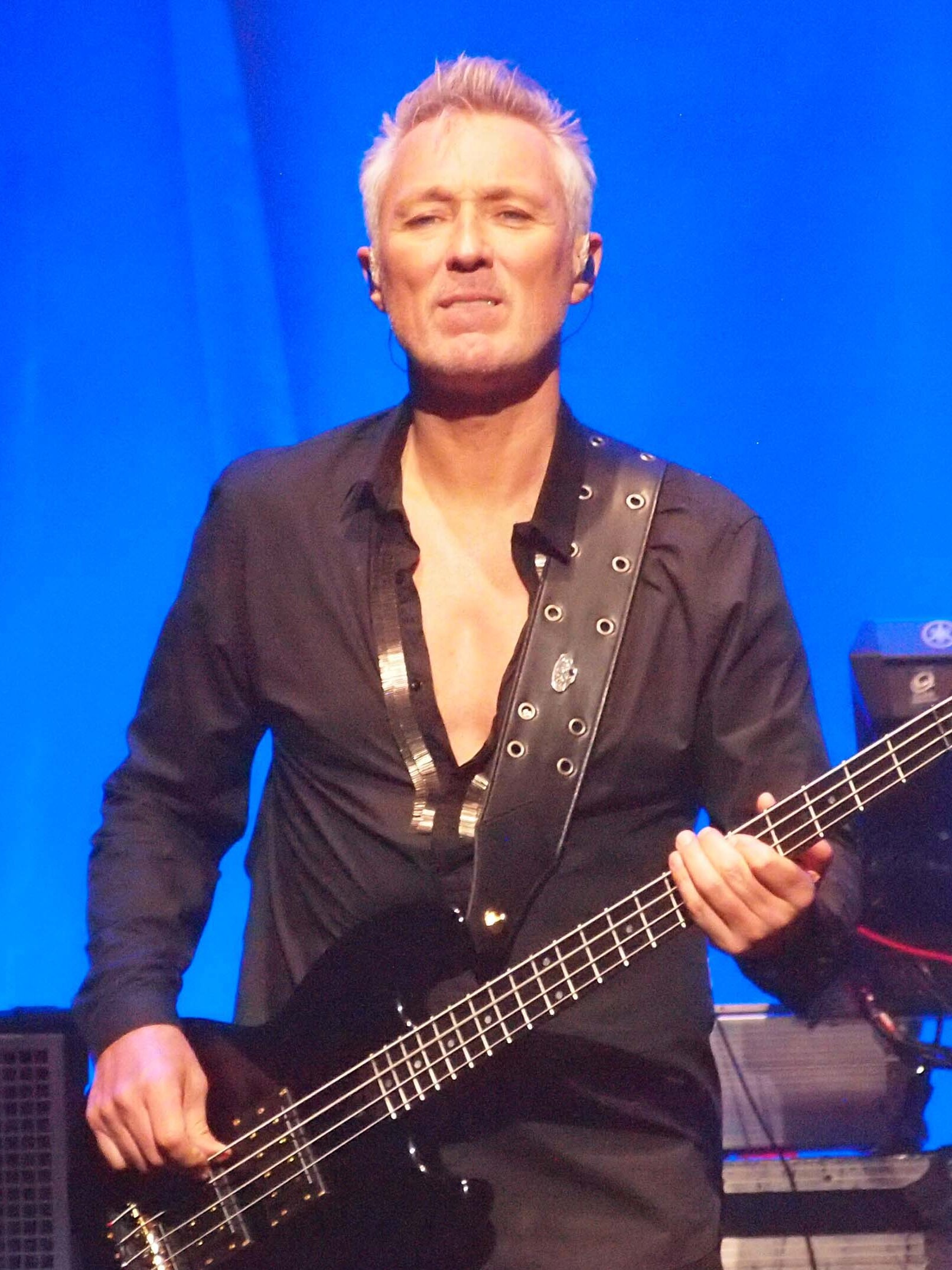
2001 and 2002 winner Martin Kemp.

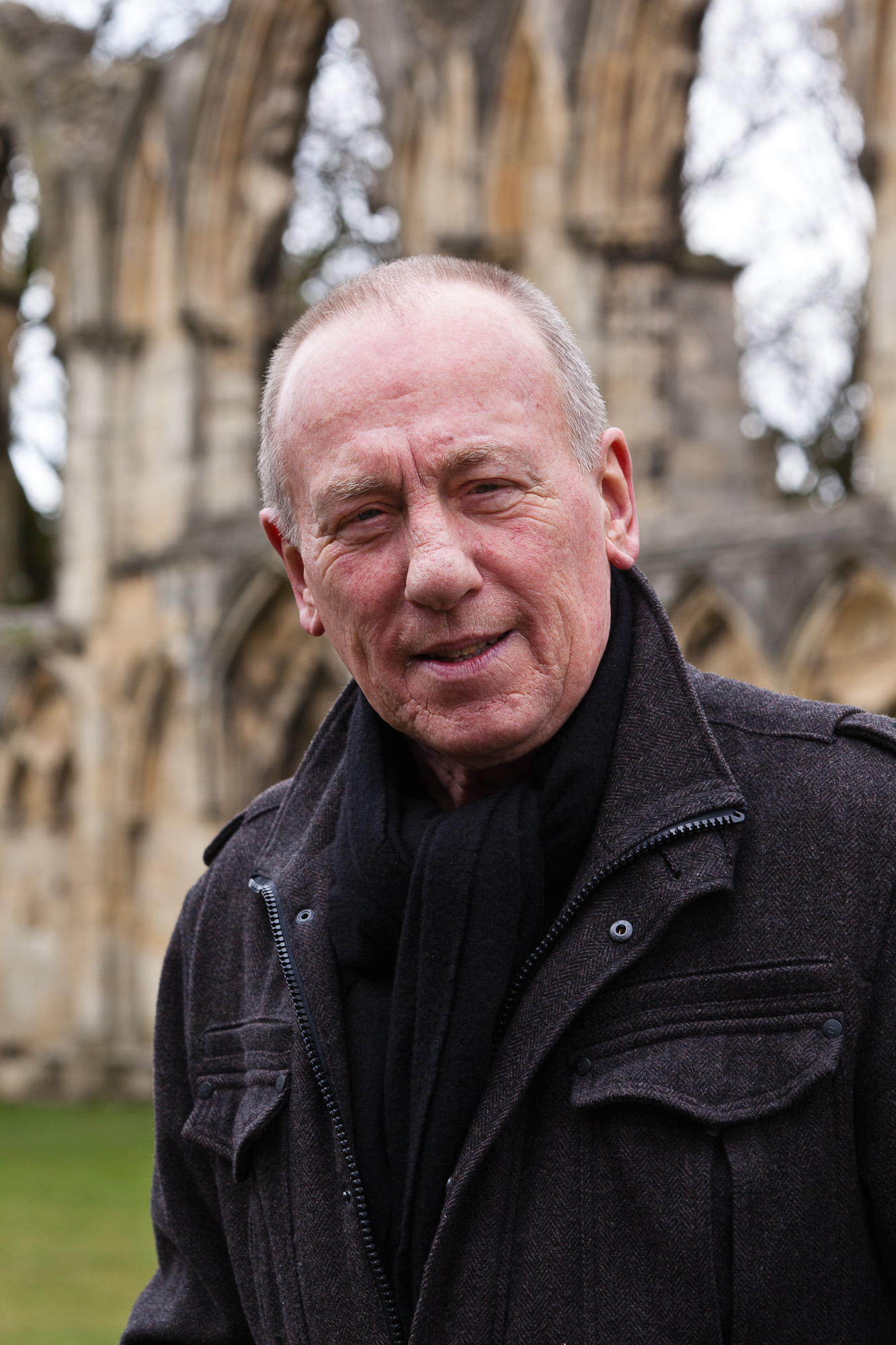
2004 nominee Christopher Timothy.

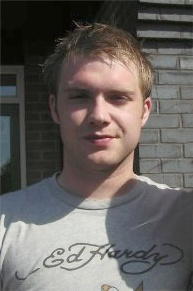
2008 winner Chris Fountain.

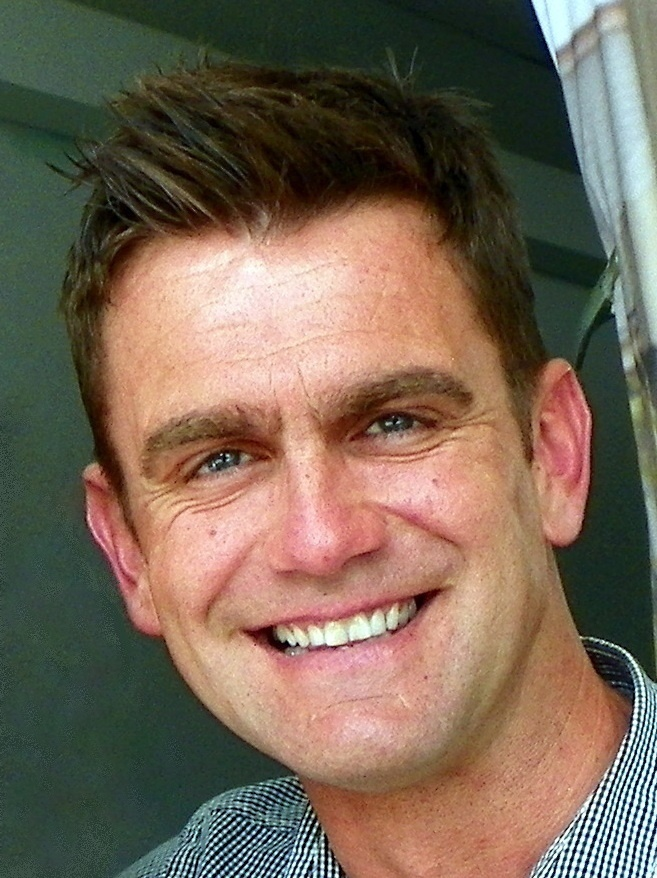
2010 winner Scott Maslen.

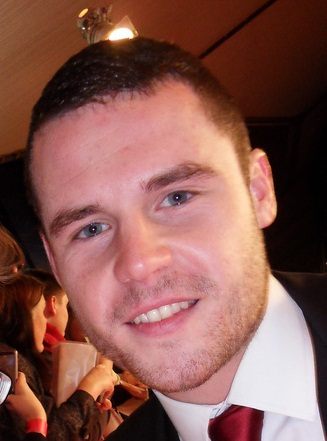
2011, 2012 and 2016 winner Danny Miller. He is the most awarded recipient.

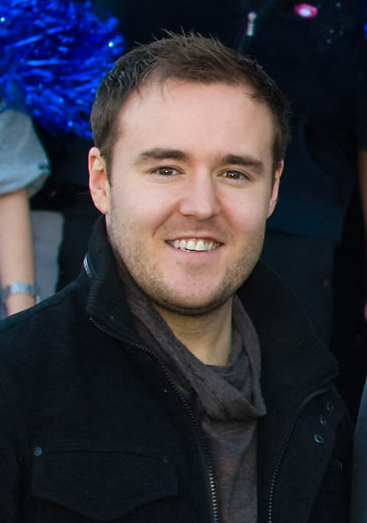
2013 winner Alan Halsall.

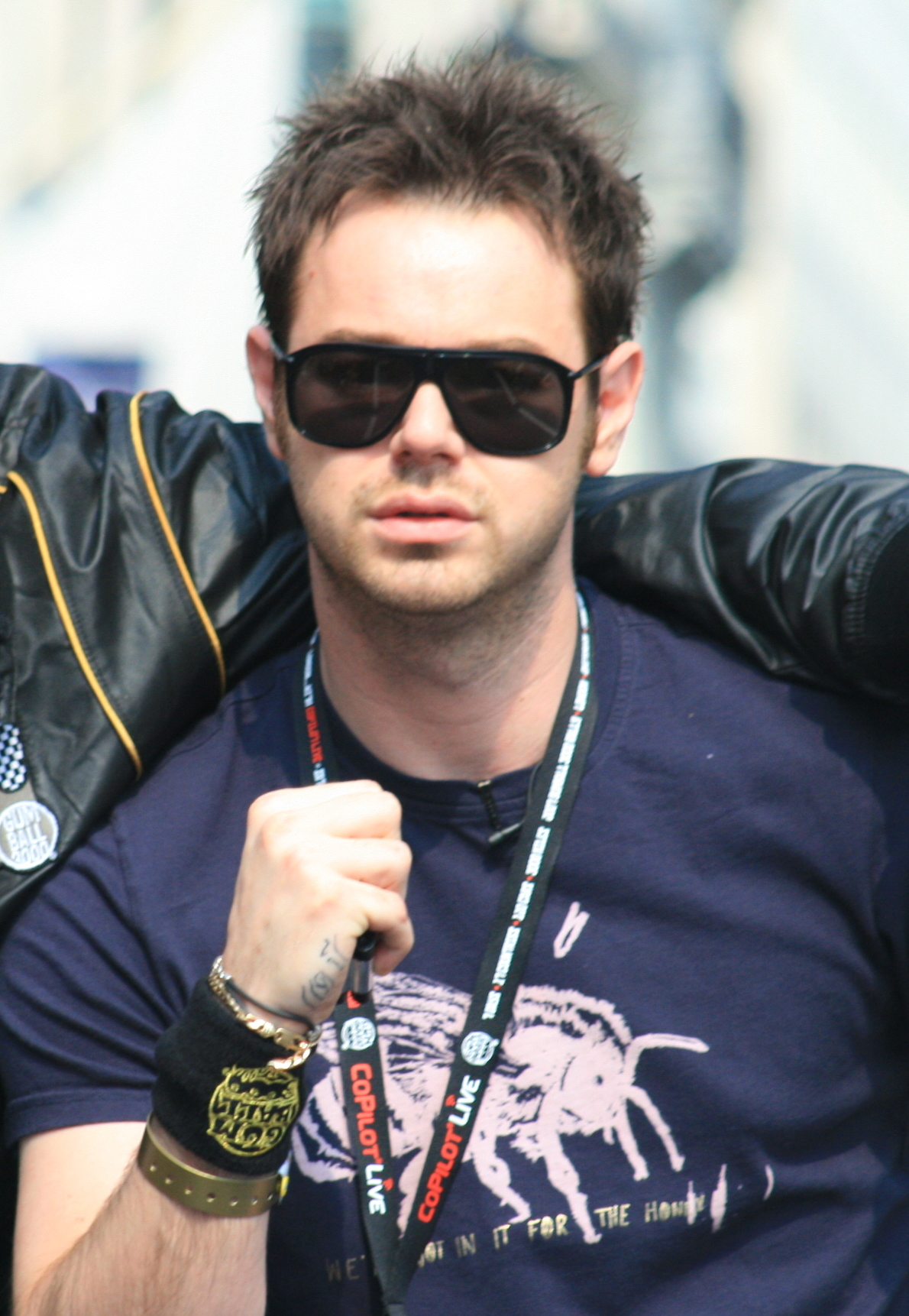
Four-time nominee Danny Dyer.

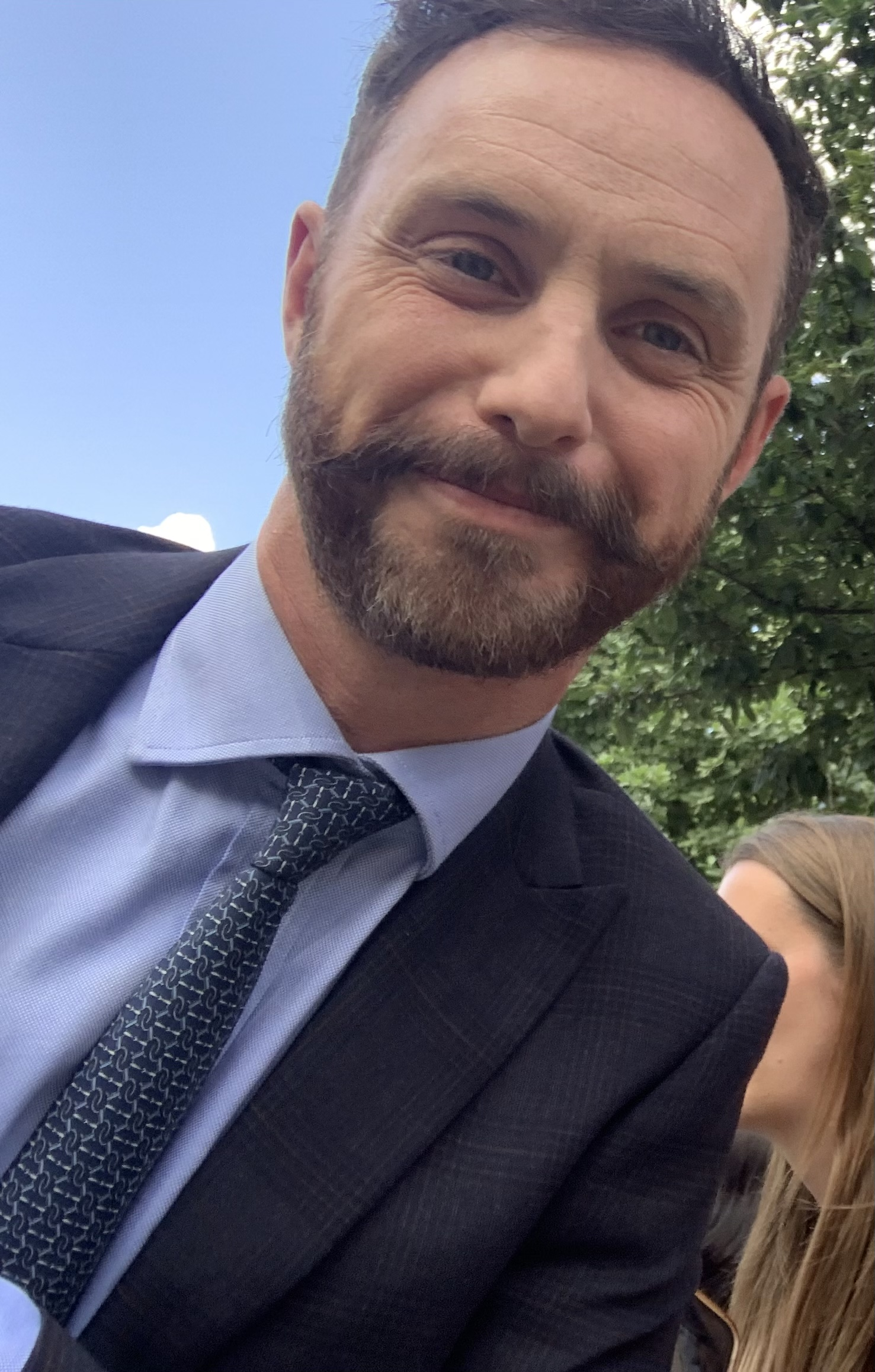
2019 winner Gregory Finnegan.

| Year | Actor | Role | Soap opera |
|---|---|---|---|
| 1999 | Ross Kemp | Grant Mitchell | EastEnders |
| 1999 | Kelvin Fletcher | Andy Sugden | Emmerdale |
| 1999 | David Neilson | Roy Cropper | Coronation Street |
| 1999 | Dean Sullivan | Jimmy Corkhill | Brookside |
| 2000 | Joe Absolom | Matthew Rose | EastEnders |
| 2000 | Martin Kemp | Steve Owen | EastEnders |
| 2000 | John Savident | Fred Elliott | Coronation Street |
| 2001 | Martin Kemp | Steve Owen | EastEnders |
| 2001 | Clive Hornby | Jack Sugden | Emmerdale |
| 2002 | Martin Kemp | Steve Owen | EastEnders |
| 2002 | Colin Wells | Jake Booth | Crossroads |
| 2002 | Perry Fenwick | Billy Mitchell | EastEnders |
| 2002 | Steve McFadden | Phil Mitchell | EastEnders |
| 2002 | Dean Sullivan | Jimmy Corkhill | Brookside |
| 2003 | Brian Capron | Richard Hillman | Coronation Street |
| 2003 | Perry Fenwick | Billy Mitchell | EastEnders |
| 2003 | Alex Ferns | Trevor Morgan | EastEnders |
| 2003 | Steve McFadden | Phil Mitchell | EastEnders |
| 2004 | Shane Richie | Alfie Moon | EastEnders |
| 2004 | Ariyon Bakare | Ben Kwarme | Doctors |
| 2004 | Billy Hartman | Terry Woods | Emmerdale |
| 2004 | Christopher Timothy | Mac McGuire | Doctors |
| 2005 | Shane Richie | Alfie Moon | EastEnders |
| 2005 | Antony Cotton | Sean Tully | Coronation Street |
| 2005 | Simon Gregson | Steve McDonald | Coronation Street |
| 2005 | Nigel Harman | Dennis Rickman | EastEnders |
| 2006 | Ross Kemp | Grant Mitchell | EastEnders |
| 2006 | Antony Cotton | Sean Tully | Coronation Street |
| 2006 | Shane Richie | Alfie Moon | EastEnders |
| 2006 | Bradley Walsh | Danny Baldwin | Coronation Street |
| 2007 | Antony Cotton | Sean Tully | Coronation Street |
| 2007 | Chris Fountain | Justin Burton | Hollyoaks |
| 2007 | James Sutton | John Paul McQueen | Hollyoaks |
| 2007 | Bill Ward | Charlie Stubbs | Coronation Street |
| 2008 | Chris Fountain | Justin Burton | Hollyoaks |
| 2008 | Charlie Clements | Bradley Branning | EastEnders |
| 2008 | Jack P. Shepherd | David Platt | Coronation Street |
| 2008 | James Sutton | John Paul McQueen | Hollyoaks |
| 2009 | Robert Kazinsky | Sean Slater | EastEnders |
| 2009 | Simon Gregson | Steve McDonald | Coronation Street |
| 2009 | Jamie Lomas | Warren Fox | Hollyoaks |
| 2009 | Gray O'Brien | Tony Gordon | Coronation Street |
| 2010 | Scott Maslen | Jack Branning | EastEnders |
| 2010 | Nitin Ganatra | Masood Ahmed | EastEnders |
| 2010 | Chris Gascoyne | Peter Barlow | Coronation Street |
| 2010 | Danny Miller | Aaron Livesy | Emmerdale |
| 2011 | Danny Miller | Aaron Livesy | Emmerdale |
| 2011 | Chris Gascoyne | Peter Barlow | Coronation Street |
| 2011 | Shane Richie | Alfie Moon | EastEnders |
| 2011 | Emmett J. Scanlan | Brendan Brady | Hollyoaks |
| 2012 | Danny Miller | Aaron Livesy | Emmerdale |
| 2012 | Chris Gascoyne | Peter Barlow | Coronation Street |
| 2012 | Shane Richie | Alfie Moon | EastEnders |
| 2012 | Emmett J. Scanlan | Brendan Brady | Hollyoaks |
| 2013 | Alan Halsall | Tyrone Dobbs | Coronation Street |
| 2013 | Nitin Ganatra | Masood Ahmed | EastEnders |
| 2013 | Jeff Hordley | Cain Dingle | Emmerdale |
| 2013 | Shane Richie | Alfie Moon | EastEnders |
| 2013 | Emmett J. Scanlan | Brendan Brady | Hollyoaks |
| 2014 | David Neilson | Roy Cropper | Coronation Street |
| 2014 | Danny Dyer | Mick Carter | EastEnders |
| 2014 | Jeff Hordley | Cain Dingle | Emmerdale |
| 2014 | Kieron Richardson | Ste Hay | Hollyoaks |
| 2014 | Jeremy Sheffield | Patrick Blake | Hollyoaks |
| 2015 | Adam Woodyatt | Ian Beale | EastEnders |
| 2015 | Danny Dyer | Mick Carter | EastEnders |
| 2015 | Simon Gregson | Steve McDonald | Coronation Street |
| 2015 | David Neilson | Roy Cropper | Coronation Street |
| 2015 | Michael Parr | Ross Barton | Emmerdale |
| 2016 | Danny Miller | Aaron Livesy | Emmerdale |
| 2016 | Charlie Clapham | Freddie Roscoe | Hollyoaks |
| 2016 | Danny Dyer | Mick Carter | EastEnders |
| 2016 | Jack P. Shepherd | David Platt | Coronation Street |
| 2016 | Kieron Richardson | Ste Hay | Hollyoaks |
| 2017 | John Middleton | Ashley Thomas | Emmerdale |
| 2017 | Gregory Finnegan | James Nightingale | Hollyoaks |
| 2017 | Jamie Lomas | Warren Fox | Hollyoaks |
| 2017 | Danny Miller | Aaron Dingle | Emmerdale |
| 2017 | Jack P. Shepherd | David Platt | Coronation Street |
| 2018 | Jack P. Shepherd | David Platt | Coronation Street |
| 2018 | Theo Graham | Hunter McQueen | Hollyoaks |
| 2018 | Ryan Hawley | Robert Sugden | Emmerdale |
| 2018 | Connor McIntyre | Pat Phelan | Coronation Street |
| 2018 | Michael Parr | Ross Barton | Emmerdale |
| 2019 | Gregory Finnegan | James Nightingale | Hollyoaks |
| 2019 | Danny Dyer | Mick Carter | EastEnders |
| 2019 | Jeff Hordley | Cain Dingle | Emmerdale |
| 2019 | Zack Morris | Keegan Baker | EastEnders |
| 2019 | Jack P. Shepherd | David Platt | Coronation Street |

== Achievements ==
=== Actors with multiple wins ===
| Actor | Role | Soap opera | Wins | Nominations (Note: These nominations did not result in a win.) |
|---|---|---|---|---|
| Danny Miller | Aaron Livesy | Emmerdale | 3 | 2 |
| Ross Kemp | Grant Mitchell | EastEnders | 2 | 0 |
| Martin Kemp | Steve Owen | EastEnders | 2 | 1 |
| Shane Richie | Alfie Moon | EastEnders | 2 | 4 |

=== Wins by soap ===
| Soap opera | Wins | Nominations |
|---|---|---|
| EastEnders | 10 | 19 |
| Coronation Street | 5 | 19 |
| Emmerdale | 4 | 11 |
| Hollyoaks | 2 | 14 |
