= Samuel Edward-Cook =

British actor

- Born: 14 June 1990 (age 36); York, England
- Education: York College; Royal Academy of Dramatic Art
- Occupation: Actor
- Years active: 2011–present
- Television: Land Girls; Peaky Blinders; Innocent; Pure

Samuel Edward-Cook (born 14 June 1990) is an English actor, known for his roles as Walter Storey in the BBC drama series Land Girls (2009), as Danny Whizz-Bang in the BBC drama series Peaky Blinders (2013), as DC Steve Beckton in the ITV drama series Innocent (2018), and as Jason in the ITV soap opera Emmerdale.

== Acting credits ==
=== Film ===
Year	Title	Role	Notes
2012	Magwitch	Abel Magwitch	Short films
2013	Passenger	Peter	Short films
2016	The Merciless Beauty	(voice)	Short films
2017	Switch	Driver	Short films
2023	Between the Lights	Jay	Feature films
2024	William Tell	Kuoni	Feature films

=== Television ===
Year	Title	Role	Notes
2011	Land Girls	Walter Storey	Series 3; Episodes 1–4
2013	Peaky Blinders	Danny 'Whizz-Bang' Owen	Series 1; Episodes 1, 3 & 6
2014	Doctors	Derek Vern	Series 15; Episodes 193 & 194: "The Moral High Ground" & "The Low Ground"
2016	Beowulf: Return to the Shieldlands	Vorhelm	Episode 6
2016	Brief Encounters	Dougie	Mini-series; 4 episodes
2017	Emmerdale	Jason	Recurring role; 5 episodes
2018	Casualty	Paul Billington	Series 32; Episode 19
2018	Innocent	DC Steve Beckton	Series 1; Episodes 1–4
2019	Silent Witness	Mick Knight	Series 22; Episodes 5 & 6: "To Brighton, To Brighton: Parts 1 & 2"
2019	Pure	Sam	Episodes 2 & 3
2023	Better	Ceri Davies	Episodes 1–5
2023	The Gallows Pole	Isaac Hartley	Mini-series; Episodes 1–3
2024	The Listeners	Damian	Mini-series; Episodes 2–4
2026	Death in Paradise	Michael Farrer	Series 15; Episode 5

=== Theatre ===
Year	Title	Role	Writer	Director	Venue
2012	Boys	Mack	Ella Hickson	Robert Icke	Nuffield Theatre, Southampton
2013	Glory Dazed	Ray	Cat Jones	Elle While	Soho Upstairs, London
2013	King Lear	Edmund	William Shakespeare	Lucy Bailey	Theatre Royal Bath, Bath
2014	Our Big Land	Roman	Dan Allum	Amy Hodge	Ovalhouse, London
2015	Titus Andronicus	Demetrius	William Shakespeare	Lucy Bailey	Shakespeare's Globe, London
2015	Antigone	Haimon	Sophocles	Ivo van Hove	King's Theatre, Edinburgh Festival
2017	Persuasion	Commander Frederick Wentworth	Jane Austen	Jeff James	Royal Exchange Theatre, Manchester
2019	Glory Dazed	Ray	Cat Jones	Adrian Rawlins	East Riding Theatre, Beverley

=== Radio ===
Year	Title	Role	Notes
2017	A Clockwork Orange	Alex	Performed live in Hull with the BBC Philharmonic

== Stage ==
Year	Title	Role	Writer	Director	Venue
2012	Boys	Mack	Ella Hickson	Robert Icke	Nuffield Theatre, Southampton
2013	Glory Dazed	Ray	Cat Jones	Elle While	Soho Upstairs, London
2013	King Lear	Edmund	William Shakespeare	Lucy Bailey	Theatre Royal Bath, Bath
2014	Our Big Land	Roman	Dan Allum	Amy Hodge	Ovalhouse, London
2015	Titus Andronicus	Demetrius	William Shakespeare	Lucy Bailey	Shakespeare's Globe, London
2015	Antigone	Haimon	Sophocles	Ivo van Hove	King's Theatre, Edinburgh Festival
2017	Persuasion	Commander Frederick Wentworth	Jane Austen	Jeff James	Royal Exchange Theatre, Manchester
2019	Glory Dazed	Ray	Cat Jones	Adrian Rawlins	East Riding Theatre, Beverley
