= Jai Sharma =

Fictional character from Emmerdale

- Emmerdale character
- Portrayed by: Chris Bisson
- Duration: 2009–present
- First appearance: Episode 5398; 11 September 2009
- Introduced by: Steve Frost
- Crossover appearances: Corriedale (2026)
In-universe information
- Occupation: Businessperson
- Father: Amit Sharma
- Mother: Georgia Sharma
- Adoptive father: Rishi Sharma
- Stepmother: Manpreet Sharma (adoptive)
- Half-brothers: Nikhil Sharma; Suni Sharma
- Half-sisters: Priya Sharma; Nisha Sharma
- Wife: Charity Dingle (2012–2014); Megan Macey (2015–2016); Laurel Thomas (2023–2025)
- Sons: Archie Breckle
- Daughters: Mia Macey; Eliza Sharma
- Stepsons: Noah Dingle; Arthur Thomas
- Stepdaughters: Debbie Dingle; Dotty Thomas
- Nieces: Molly Sharma; Amba Metcalfe

Jai Sharma is a fictional character from the British ITV soap opera Emmerdale, played by Chris Bisson. He made his first on-screen appearance on 11 September 2009, alongside his brother Nikhil (Rik Makarem). In 2013, Bisson temporarily departed Emmerdale on 24 January because of the birth of his child and returned at the end of March that year.

During his time on the show, Jai formed the "Sharma & Sharma factory" alongside Nikhil and their father Rishi (Bhasker Patel); closely interacted with his estranged mother Georgia Sharma (Trudie Goodwin); developed a close friendship with local businessman Declan Macey (Jason Merrells) that lasts until it transpires that Jai is the father of Declan's supposed daughter, Mia (Sapphire Elia), following her death in a road collision; embarked on a relationship-turned-marriage with wayward "tart with a heart" Charity Tate (Emma Atkins); became enemies with Charity's cousin and ex-lover Cain Dingle (Jeff Hordley) over his attempts to destroy their relationship and bonding with Jai's sister Priya (Fiona Wade); engaged in a one-night stand with Priya's friend Rachel Breckle (Gemma Oaten) that results in her conceiving their beloved son, Archie, and his marriage with Charity ending; kidnapping Charity after she took revenge for his one-night stand by framing Rachel for setting fire to Declan's house, "Home Farm", in order for her to abscond the country with Archie so that Jai would never see his son again; reclaim his son Archie until Rachel returns to reveal that she had him all along and that the child Jai had was never Archie; married Declan's sister Megan (Gaynor Faye) over their mutual animosity towards Charity; sparked an affair with Megan's business partner Leyla Harding (Roxy Shahidi) that results in Megan betraying Jai in his custody battle with Rachel over Archie; repeatedly clashed with Cain's brother and Rachel's boyfriend Sam (James Hooton); exhibited a cocaine addiction until he eventually reconciles with Megan after she gives birth to their daughter Eliza; befriended Cain's stepdaughter Holly Barton (Sophie Powles) about his cocaine addiction and later feeling guilty when she later dies of an overdose; and romanced with Holly's apparent best-friend, Nell Fairfax (Scarlett Archer), who soon turns out to be an con-artistic drug addict.

== Creation and casting ==
On 21 July 2009, entertainment website Digital Spy reported that Emmerdale would be introducing "a new trio of entrepreneurial siblings", Jai, Nikhil and Priya Sharma as part of the soap's ongoing reinvention. Former Coronation Street actor Chris Bisson was cast as Jai Sharma, along with Rik Makarem and Effie Woods who were cast in the roles of Nikhil and Priya Sharma respectively. Of his casting Bisson commented: "Jai is a bit of a charmer and has an eye for the ladies but he's also a hard worker with a good business mind. I'm delighted to be joining Emmerdale at a time when the show is going from strength to strength. I cannot wait to get started." The show's series producer Gavin Blyth said of the family: "The Sharmas are a young, contemporary family independent of their parents and will bring the factory into the heart of the village community. They will add real vitality to life in Emmerdale." Bisson began filming his scenes on 21 July.

== Development ==
In an interview on 1 September 2009, Bisson explained the Sharma backstory, that "Jai had left the family business and set up a chain of mobile phone shops, sold them at the top of the market, and now has a load of money... Jai will take chances, he's a bit of a maverick, he can talk people round, he can get the best out of people and that's irritating for Nikhil because he's not at all like his big brother."

== Storylines ==
Jai moves to the village with his brother, Nikhil (Rik Makarem) and his sister Priya (Fiona Wade), to open a sweet factory. Jai is annoyed when Nikhil keeps talking about their father would run things so Jai reminds Nikhil that they run the factory, not their father. Jai soon befriends Faye Lamb (Kim Thomson) and takes a shine to Maisie Wylde (Alice Coulthard). Jai is annoyed with Priya's bad behaviour and tells her to either stop or move out of his house.

Carl King (Tom Lister) accuses Jai and Nikhil of causing a massive chemical spill and Jai decides to teach Carl a lesson but Nikhil stops him. Jai and Faye date briefly. Jai gives Charity Tate (Emma Atkins) a job at the factory and makes it clear that he likes her. She likes him too but refuses to take things any further while she is dating Cain Dingle (Jeff Hordley). After Charity learns that Cain has cheated on her, she ends the relationship and starts dating Jai. Cain tries numerous ways to break Jai and Charity up but Jai only ends things with Charity when he learns that she has been undermining Nikhil at the factory. Charity tries to get Jai to change his mind, but he refuses but throws Ella Hart (Corrinne Wicks) out when she makes advances towards him. Charity eventually persuades Jai to rekindle their relationship and the pair get engaged. At the engagement party, Declan Macey (Jason Merrells) attacks Jai after Ella reveals that Jai is Mia Macey's (Sapphire Elia) birth father, not him.

Jai's parents, Rishi (Bhasker Patel) and Georgia Sharma (Trudie Goodwin), visit to meet Charity. Rishi is impressed but Georgia is clearly not. The family are concerned about Priya's relationship with Cain and Jai tries to stop her meeting him and accidentally hits her, knocking her to the ground. Cain encourages her to call the police and report him so Jai is arrested and released with a caution. Cain's constant interference makes Jai and Charity feel that they have to call the wedding off. Jai is one of six suspects when Cain is attacked. Cameron Murray (Dominic Power) finds Jai standing over an unconscious Cain. When questioned, Jai insists that he found Cain that way and was going to get help. Jai is arrested but released due to lack of evidence, until Cain tells the police that Jai attacked him. Jai's family and Charity try to get him released and Charity even visits Cain and asks him to drop the charges, but he refuses. Jai is released on bail and shouts at Nikhil who blames Charity and insists on trying to convince Jai of this until but Jai tells him that Charity's family have disowned her for supporting him and he is extremely grateful for it.

Jai tells Charity that he wants children but she does not, due to two difficult pregnancies so she suggests Jai adopt her son, Noah (Jack Downham). When he learns that Nikhil and his girlfriend are expecting a baby, Jai and Charity argue and he goes to the factory and gets drunk. When Pyria's friend Rachel Breckle (Gemma Oaten) arrives, Jai persuades her to have a drink with him and they end up sleeping together. Rachel later finds that she is pregnant and, refusing to be anyone's dirty little secret, demands that Jai tell Charity. Jai refuses and offers Rachel an expensive flat away from the village but she refuses so he buys a house in the village for her and the baby, telling Charity that Rachel will be their tenant. Rachel and Charity argue and Rachel goes into labour. Jai takes Rachel's boyfriend and Cain's brother, Sam (James Hooton), to the hospital and tries to find out how she and the baby are. He is relieved to learn the baby has been born safely and Rachel lets him see his son but will not allow him to visit regularly, worried that Charity will find out. Jai employs Rachel to clean Holdgate Farm, allowing him to have contact with Archie. When Charity sees Jai with Archie, she realizes that he is Archie's father and confronts him but Rishi claims that he is Archie's father. Soon afterwards, Jai learns Charity had a one-night stand with Declan. After arguing briefly, Jai and Charity reconcile but Charity realizes that Rishi lied and ends their marriage. Charity smashes up Jai's car with a JCB digger and he convinces Charity to meet him at the lake where she declared her love for him, but she throws her wedding ring onto the frozen lake. While trying to retrieve it, Jai falls into the water when the ice breaks. Charity calls an ambulance so Jai gives Charity divorce papers, telling her he wants to do it as easily as possible, annoying her that he is unaffected by her actions. When he later finds her in bed with Ross Barton (Michael Parr), he initially attacks him but refuses to play Charity's game. Charity insists on organizing Archie's first birthday but struggles to cope and demands that he choose – her or Archie. Jai initially chooses Charity and Noah, even buying her an eternity ring but realizes that he cannot break off contact with his son so he and Charity separate. She and Noah move in with Debbie and Charity refuses to let him see Noah, trying to hurt him. Jai sees Archie regularly until Rachel tells the police that she started the fire at Home Farm and leaves the area, taking Archie with her. He hopes to gain custody but Rachel does not show for her trial. He persuades Sam to help him find Rachel but the Dingles worry that Sam is neglecting his son. Charity confronts Jai and he admits that he only cares about getting Archie back so Charity records the conversation and plays it to Sam, who realizes that he was being used and refuses to have anything to do with him. Jai sacks the solicitor he hired to search for Archie before a man named Mark (Chris Lindon), approaches him after seeing the appeal Jai set up – claiming to know where Rachel and Archie are. Jai is skeptical until Mark shows him a picture of Rachel on his phone. They agree to work together, providing that Jai pays Mark £10,000. He leads them to Rachel's old estate, claiming she is living there and he has seen her regularly. Jai believes him but Mark demands another £10,000, fearing that he will be attacked for talking to a stranger. Jai complies and they go to the estate together but Mark insists he wait in the car and disappears with the cash. However, Charity and Declan trail Jai and Mark, terrified their crime will be exposed. After targeting Mark, they threaten him but Mark admits he hasn't seen Rachel for years and agrees to keep his mouth shut. He flees, leaving Charity and Declan to cover their tracks and disappear. Jai is devastated when he realizes he has been played, as he trusted Mark. He spends an evening drinking before Declan's sister, Megan (Gaynor Faye), drops by. After confiding in one another, they kiss. The next morning, they regret their actions and decide it meant nothing but later become a couple.

However, Jai soon turns his interest to Leyla Harding (Roxy Shahidi), who plans to invest in Sharma & Sharma but Megan challenges her for the possible offer. An irritated Leyla then suggests that she and Megan take £40 of Jai's money and build on it. Megan agrees and the women go head to head, trying to outdo each other – Megan attempts to sell a deal involving chocolate Santas while Leyla sells burgers. Jai initially underestimates Leyla, thinking she is not very intelligent but is surprised when Leyla dresses up in an old lapdancing costume. Leyla quickly sells her stock, annoying Megan but she soon regrets this and sees Leyla's potential as a business partner, persuading Leyla to join her in a wedding planning business. Jai is angry that Leyla chose to start a business with Megan but the two soon become attracted to each other and kiss in secret. After an afternoon of passion in Leyla's office, Megan almost catches them but they continue their relationship. Things sour when Priya's new beau Rakesh Kotecha (Pasha Bocarie) arrives and it is revealed that Rakesh is a former business rival of Jai's. This is not helped when Priya announces that she plans to marry Rakesh, causing a rift between Jai and Priya. He is rankled when they go on to perform their engagement ceremony, regardless of his feelings. After having sex in the factory office, Jai and Leyla are caught by Rakesh, who uses this to blackmail Jai to keep quiet.

A month later, Declan, who was believed to be dead, returns and threatens to kill Megan, before revealing Charity's crimes to her family. These include blackmailing Rachel to leave with her son. Jai and the Dingles are livid but when Jai demands Charity tells him where Rachel is, she claims she doesn't know. Outcast from her family, Charity discovers that Declan has left a DVD of incriminating evidence. Her lawyer cannot defend her after she admitted that her involvement was 50/50 in most of the crimes and she decides to flee, leaving Noah with Debbie. However, she is attacked by a mystery assailant and falls unconscious. Waking up in a shipping container, she finds herself chained in near darkness with only a small bottle of water. The door opens to reveal that her attacker is Jai, who has kidnapped her in revenge for her sending his son away. Jai tells Charity that unless she reveals Archie's location, he will leave her to die but she claims she doesn't know where Rachel is and that Declan was lying. She begs for him to let her live, reminding him of what they once had, but he is unsympathetic and tells her that she is not getting any more food or water. After he leaves, Sam approaches Jai, suspecting that he is involved in Charity's disappearance, and demands his car keys so he can find her. When Jai refuses, they fight and Jai is knocked over the balcony, falling heavily. Before he falls unconscious, he tells Sam that Charity is in the woods and that the keys are in his pocket. When he comes around in hospital, he discovers that Charity has been rescued. After discharging, he meets her in the Woolpack and she threatens him that he would not get away with what he did and to stay away from her.

Megan, now suspicious of Jai and Leyla, confronts her after seeing how distressed Leyla was whilst Jai was comatose and lies that he has died, leading Leyla to admit the truth. Furious, Megan determines to buy Leyla out but is put out when she doesn't have the money to do so. She initially plans to find another way to get rid of Leyla but later tells her that she can stay, providing they work separately and only see each other when necessary. Leyla agrees and Megan tells her that she is not dumping Jai, as she has lost too much already. Consequently, when Jai is approached by a man called Josh, who claims to be bringing Archie back as Rachel needs money for rehab, Jai believes him. He pays Josh and he, Megan and baby Archie become a family until Rachel and the real Archie return. On learning that he has bought someone else's child, Jai calls Social Services, giving "Archie" to them and later learns that Josh sold his own son. Desperate to gain custody of the real Archie, he locks Rachel in a freezer when she threatens to use him buying a baby against him in court. He later releases her and goes to a solicitor, seeking residency, claiming that he and his wife can provide better than Rachel and Sam. Knowing that he has no case, Jai resorts to dirty tricks – including drugging Rachel so she misses a mediation session and putting a camera on Archie's teddy bear so he can spy on Rachel and Sam. Sadly for Jai, the camera records him and Leyla together and Rachel finds the footage. She and Sam show Megan the footage and they plan revenge together. Jai gets custody of Archie briefly after the police find drugs in Rachel's belongings. She is arrested and charged with possession but Megan's revenge on Jai is to tell the family court about he had been bullying Rachel in the hope she would drop her case for residency. She also claims to have had a miscarriage and the family court, now believing that Jai is a danger to his son, only allows him supervised access twice a month. Consequently, Jai starts taking cocaine far more regularly and makes himself seriously ill on two occasions, unaware that Megan is still pregnant.

In March 2018, Jai finds bruises on Eliza's legs following her 2nd birthday party. When Priya confesses to having an outburst towards his daughter earlier, Jai and Megan suspect her of child abuse, a belief that is strengthened when the bruises disappear after Megan takes full custody of her. Ultimately, however, Priya's innocence is proved when Eliza's bruises return and are determined to be the result of her medication for epilepsy.

== Reception ==
Holy Soap describe Jai's most memorable moment as "Informing brother Nikhil that he now owned the factory, rather than their father." Kate White of Inside Soap labelled Jai a hypocrite when he became annoyed after Charity slept with Declan, despite his previous infidelity with Ella and Rachel, "Jai, you really do not have a leg to stand on when being furious at Charity and Declan's infidelity. 1) You slept with Declan's wife first. 2) You've also slept with Rachel. 3) She's even had your bloody baby. 'Hypocrite' doesn't begin to cover it!" In 2017, Laura-Jayne Tyler from the same magazine called Megan's custody battle with Jai a "snore-fest". In 2025, Chloe Timms from Inside Soap called Jai's new romance with Kerry Wyatt (Laura Norton) "sweet" but questioned what the chances of it surviving was.

== See also ==
- List of soap opera villains
