= Jamaica Inn (2014 TV series) =

2013 British television series

- Genre: Drama
- Based on: Jamaica Inn by Daphne du Maurier
- Written by: Emma Frost
- Directed by: Philippa Lowthorpe
- Composers: Cristobal Tapia de Veer; Kim Neundorf
- Country of origin: United Kingdom
- Original language: English
- No. of series: 1
- No. of episodes: 3

Production
- Executive producers: Ed Rubin; Joanie Blaikie; Hilary Heath; Sarah Stack; Stephen Wright; Hugo Heppell
- Producers: David Thompson; Dan Winch
- Production locations: Cornwall; Yorkshire; Cumbria
- Editor: David Thrasher
- Running time: 180 minutes
- Production company: Origin Pictures

Original release
- Network: BBC One; BBC One HD
- Release: 21 April – 23 April 2014

Jamaica Inn is a British drama television series that was first broadcast on BBC One for three consecutive nights from 21 to 23 April 2014. The three-part series, written by Emma Frost, is an adaptation of Daphne du Maurier's 1936 gothic novel Jamaica Inn set in Cornwall. It was poorly received, becoming a subject of controversy and making national news over its mumbling cast and other sound problems.

== Plot ==
Jamaica Inn is set in 1821. It tells the story of Mary Yellan, who is uprooted to live with her Aunt Patience after her mother dies. Mary finds Patience under the spell of her husband, Joss Merlyn, after she arrives at Jamaica Inn, a coaching inn he owns in Cornwall. Mary soon realises that the inn has no guests and is being used as the hub of Joss' criminal activity, misleading ships and plundering their wreckage. Mary becomes attracted to Joss' younger brother, Jem Merlyn, who is a petty thief. Mary hopes for help from Francis Davey, the parish vicar, and his sister Hannah.

== Cast ==
- Jessica Brown Findlay as Mary Yellan
- Matthew McNulty as Jem Merlyn
- Sean Harris as Joss Merlyn
- Joanne Whalley as Patience Merlyn
- Shirley Henderson as Hannah Davey
- Ben Daniels as Francis Davey
- Andrew Scarborough as Magistrate Bassat
- Danny Miller as William
- Christopher Fairbank as Harry
- Patrick O'Kane as Legassik
- Charles Furness as Thomas
- Elliot Levey as Ambrose
- Scarlett Archer as Beth
- Andy Gillies as Cakey
- David Beck as Twin 1
- Daniel Beck as Twin 2
- Charlie Wade as Flashy Dealer

== Background and production ==
The three-part series was commissioned by Ben Stephenson and Danny Cohen, both from the BBC. Filming began in September 2013 in Cornwall, Yorkshire and Cumbria (Kirkby Lonsdale). It was originally decided that the series would be filmed in Northern Ireland. An investment from Screen Yorkshire was provided for the series.

== Episodes ==
No. in series	Title	Directed by	Written by	Original release date	UK viewers (millions)
1	"Episode 1"	Philippa Lowthorpe	Emma Frost	21 April 2014	7.25
2	"Episode 2"	Philippa Lowthorpe	Emma Frost	22 April 2014	5.44
3	"Episode 3"	Philippa Lowthorpe	Emma Frost	23 April 2014	5.17

== Reception ==
The transmission of the first episode brought about a major debate on social media sites about the sound quality and inaudible dialogue, culminating in over 2,000 complaints being received by the end of the series.

Terry Ramsey of The Daily Telegraph wrote that "Daphne du Maurier's story is a classic, but this hard-to-watch (and hear) version is unlikely to have had people gripped." David Stephenson of Daily Express agreed, describing it as a "disappointing BBC drama with mumbling dialogue and absent plot." Sean Harris later addressed his reaction to the mumbling controversy in an interview after his BAFTA Award for Best Actor in a Drama Series for Southcliffe.
