= Danny Miller (actor) =

English actor (born 1991)

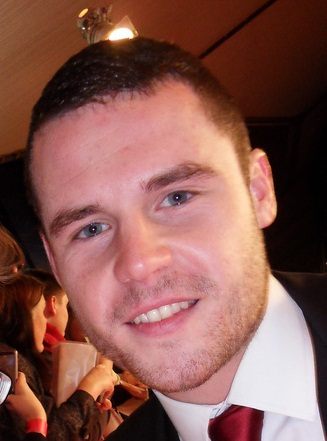
- Miller in 2009
- Born: Daniel Benedict Miller; 2 January 1991 (age 35); Stockport, Greater Manchester, England
- Occupation: Actor
- Years active: 2007–present
- Spouse: Steph Jones (m. 2021)
- Children: 3

Daniel Benedict Miller (born 2 January 1991) is an English actor. He is known for his role as Aaron Dingle in the ITV soap opera Emmerdale, for which he has won the British Soap Award for Best Actor in 2011, 2012 and 2016. He won the twenty-first series of I'm a Celebrity...Get Me Out of Here! in 2021.

== Career ==
In 2007, at the age of 16, Miller made his television debut when he played Kyle Brown in the BBC drama series Grange Hill. He appeared in 8 episodes. In 2008, Miller began playing Aaron Livesy on the ITV soap opera Emmerdale. In 2011, he announced that he was leaving Emmerdale and his last appearance would be in spring 2012. On 22 October 2011, alongside his family, Miller appeared on the ITV game show All Star Family Fortunes. From December 2012 to January 2013, he starred as Prince Charming in the pantomime production of Cinderella at the Grand Theatre in Blackpool. Later in 2013, he appeared in the ITV drama Lightfields. In April 2014, Miller played William in the BBC production of Jamaica Inn. Miller joined the cast of Scott & Bailey, in late 2013, as series regular Rob Waddington. He appeared in the series until 2014.

In April 2014, Miller agreed to return to Emmerdale and reprised his role as Aaron Livesy later that year. His return scenes aired on 14 August 2014.

In November 2021, Miller was announced as a contestant on the twenty-first series of I'm a Celebrity...Get Me Out of Here!. He was announced winner of the series on 12 December.

== Personal life ==
In 2011, Miller co-founded the charity Once Upon a Smile with Daniel Jillings in memory of former Emmerdale producer Gavin Blyth. In January 2021, Miller got engaged to partner Steph Jones. The couple announced in May 2021 that they were expecting their first child. After being told they would be unlikely to conceive naturally, Miller explained that they were about to begin the IVF process, when they found out Steph was pregnant. The child's birth was announced on 27 October 2021.

== Filmography ==
Year	Title	Role	Notes
2007	Grange Hill	Kyle Brown	Series 30; 8 episodes
2008–2012, 2014–present	Emmerdale	Aaron Dingle	Regular role 1649+ episodes
2011	Who Wants to Be a Millionaire	Himself	Contestant
2011	All Star Family Fortunes	Himself	Episode: "Danny Miller vs Stacey Solomon"
2013	Lightfields	Tom	Main role
2013–2014	Scott & Bailey	Det. Sgt. Rob Waddington	Main role
2014	Jamaica Inn	William	Recurring role
2016	Cruel Summer	Nicholas	Film role
2021	I'm a Celebrity...Get Me Out of Here!	Himself - Contestant	Series 21; winner
2025	Celebrity Mastermind	Himself - Contestant	Contestant
2025	Richard Osman's House of Games	Himself - Contestant	Series 8; winner

Stage
Year	Title	Role	Venue
2012–2013	Cinderella	Prince Charming	Grand Theatre, Blackpool

== Awards and nominations ==
Year	Result	Award	Category	Work
2009	Nominated	Inside Soap Awards	Best Newcomer	Emmerdale
2009	Nominated	TV Quick & TV Choice Awards	Best Soap Newcomer	Emmerdale
2010	Nominated	British Soap Awards	Best Actor	Emmerdale
2010	Nominated	British Soap Awards	Best Dramatic Performance	Emmerdale
2010	Nominated	British Soap Awards	Sexiest Male	Emmerdale
2010	Won	TV Quick & TV Choice Awards	Best Soap Actor	Emmerdale
2010	Won	Inside Soap Awards	Best Actor	Emmerdale
2010	Nominated	Inside Soap Awards	Sexiest Male	Emmerdale
2010	Won	Inside Soap Awards	Best Dramatic Performance	Emmerdale
2010	Nominated	National Television Awards	Serial Drama Performance	Emmerdale
2010	Won	TV Times Awards	Favourite Newcomer	Emmerdale
2010	Nominated	TV Now Awards	Favourite Male Soap Star	Emmerdale
2011	Won	All About Soap Awards	Best Actor	Emmerdale
2011	Won	British Soap Awards	Best Actor	Emmerdale
2011	Nominated	British Soap Awards	Best Dramatic Performance	Emmerdale
2011	Nominated	British Soap Awards	Sexiest Male	Emmerdale
2011	Nominated	TV Choice Awards	Best Soap Actor	Emmerdale
2011	Won	Inside Soap Awards	Best Actor	Emmerdale
2011	Won	Inside Soap Awards	Best Dramatic Performance	Emmerdale
2011	Nominated	Inside Soap Awards	Sexiest Male	Emmerdale
2011	Won	TV Times Awards	Favourite Soap Star	Emmerdale
2011	Nominated	National Television Awards	Serial Drama Performance	Emmerdale
2011	Won	Digital Spy Readers' Awards	Best Actor	Emmerdale
2012	Nominated	All About Soap Awards	Best Actor	Emmerdale
2012	Won	British Soap Awards	Best Actor	Emmerdale
2015	Won	TV Choice Awards	Best Soap Actor	Emmerdale
2016	Won	British Soap Awards	Best Actor	Emmerdale
2016	Won	British Soap Awards	Best Male Dramatic Performance	Emmerdale
2016	Nominated	British Soap Awards	Best On-Screen Partnership (with Ryan Hawley)	Emmerdale
2016	Won	TV Choice Awards	Best Soap Actor	Emmerdale
2016	Nominated	Inside Soap Awards	Best Actor	Emmerdale
2016	Won	Inside Soap Awards	Best Partnership (with Ryan Hawley)	Emmerdale
2016	Won	TV Times Awards	Favourite Soap Star	Emmerdale
2017	Nominated	National Television Awards	Serial Drama Performance	Emmerdale
2017	Nominated	British Soap Awards	Best Actor	Emmerdale
2017	Nominated	TV Choice Awards	Best Soap Actor	Emmerdale
2017	Won	Inside Soap Awards	Best Actor	Emmerdale
2017	Nominated	Inside Soap Awards	Best Partnership (with Ryan Hawley)	Emmerdale
2017	Won	TV Times Awards	Favourite Soap Star	Emmerdale
2017	Won	Digital Spy Readers' Awards	Best Actor	Emmerdale
2017	Won	Digital Spy Readers' Awards	Best Soap Relationship (with Ryan Hawley)	Emmerdale
2018	Nominated	National Television Awards	Serial Drama Performance	Emmerdale
2018	Won	Inside Soap Awards	Male Soap Superstar	Emmerdale
2019	Nominated	Digital Spy Readers' Awards	Best Actor	Emmerdale
2020	Nominated	National Television Awards	Serial Drama Performance	Emmerdale

Awards and achievements
Preceded by Adam Woodyatt	British Soap Award for Best Actor; 2016	Succeeded by John Middleton
Preceded by Scott Maslen	British Soap Award for Best Actor; 2011–2012	Succeeded by Alan Halsall
Preceded by Giovanna Fletcher	I'm a Celebrity... Get Me Out of Here! Winner & King of the Castle; 2021	Succeeded by Jill Scott (only as Winner)
