= Chris Bisson =

British actor

- Born: Christopher Paul Bisson; 21 July 1975 (age 50); Wythenshawe, Manchester, England
- Occupation: Actor
- Years active: 1990–present
- Partner: Rowena Finn (2006–present)
- Children: 2

Christopher Paul Bisson (born 21 July 1975) is a British actor, known for portraying the roles of Vikram Desai in Coronation Street (1999–2002), Kash Karib in Shameless (2004–2007, 2009), and Jai Sharma in Emmerdale (2009–present).

== Television ==
Bisson first appeared on television as J.J. in Children's Ward in 1990. He went on to appear in Prime Suspect, Holby City and as Vikram Desai in Coronation Street. Then as 'Saleem Khan' in the 1999 film East Is East. Kash Karib in Shameless and Jai Sharma in Emmerdale. He appeared in Perfect Day: The Wedding (2005), Perfect Day: The Funeral (2006; Channel 5) and the feature film Stepdad (filmed in February 2007). He participated in the Channel 4 documentary Empire's Children (2007).

Bisson appeared in the Valentine's Day 2009 episode of Casualty, and on the last series of Hotel Babylon. He returned to make a one-off appearance in Shameless in April 2009, where his character was killed off.

In September 2009, Bisson joined the cast of Emmerdale, as part of the newly cast Sharma family, playing Jai Sharma. Bisson temporarily departed Emmerdale on 24 January 2013, due to the birth of his child. He later returned at the end of March 2013.

Bisson appeared in the second series of the ITV reality show I'm a Celebrity Get Me Out of Here!. He and his family appeared on All Star Family Fortunes in October 2011.

In 2012, he appeared in the CBBC series 12 Again where he revealed he once failed to show up for a date at the cinema with Anna Friel at the time.

On 15 December 2013, Bisson took part in The Chase: Celebrity Special to raise money for his selected charity.

On 18 June 2014, he took part in All Star Mr & Mrs with his partner.

On 11 October 2020, he appeared on the ITV game show, Tipping Point Lucky Stars which culminated in him winning the jackpot of £20,000 for his charity.

In December 2024 he won The Great Christmas/Festive Bake Off Soap opera stars edition.

== Personal life ==
Bisson was born in Wythenshawe, Manchester in an Indo-Trinidadian family originally from Rajasthan in India. He is Catholic. He is colour blind.

== Filmography ==
=== Film ===
| Year | Title | Role | Notes |
|---|---|---|---|
| 1999 | East Is East | Saleem Khan | |
| 2001 | Understanding Jane | Off Licence Storekeeper | |
| 2005 | Chicken Tikka Masala | Jimi | |
| 2005 | Izzat | Man in the telephone booth | |
| 2005 | Four Brothers and a Funeral | Ram | Short film |
| 2007 | Death of a Socialist | Charlie | Short film |

=== Television ===
| Year | Title | Role | Notes |
|---|---|---|---|
| 1990 | Children's Ward | J. J. | TV series; 13 episodes |
| 1996 | Prime Suspect 5: Errors of Judgement | Nazir | 2 episodes |
| 1998 | The Cops | Omar Assi | 1 episode |
| 1998, 2005 | Where the Heart Is | Kahil (1998); Jimmy (2005) | 2 episodes |
| 1999–2002 | Coronation Street | Vikram Desai | Series regular, 329 episodes |
| 1999 | Coronation Street: After Hours | Vikram Desai | 6 episodes |
| 2003 | Indian Dream | Surender | Television film; credited as Christopher Bisson |
| 2003 | Spoilt | Johnny | Television film |
| 2004 | Holby City | Mark Watkins | 1 episode; credited as Christopher Bisson |
| 2004 | The Afternoon Play | Digger | 1 episode |
| 2004–2007, 2009 | Shameless | Kash Karib | 19 episodes |
| 2005 | Perfect Day | Billy | Television film; credited as Christopher Bisson |
| 2005 | 10:96: Training Night | PC David Sands | Television film |
| 2006 | Perfect Day: The Funeral | Billy | 1 episode; credited as Christopher Bisson |
| 2006 | Magnolia | Dino | Television film; credited as Christopher Bisson |
| 2006 | New Street Law | Sammi Kaswa | 1 episode |
| 2006 | Manchester Passion | Barabbas | Television film; credited as Christopher Bisson |
| 2006, 2009 | Doctors | Des Lawrenson (2006); James Guple (2009) | 2 episodes |
| 2008 | Stepdad | Doctor | Television film |
| 2008 | Echo Beach | Amit Gurai | 1 episode; credited as Christopher Bisson |
| 2009 | Casualty | Carl | 1 episode; credited as Christopher Bisson |
| 2009 | Hotel Babylon | Omar | 1 episode; credited as Christopher Bisson |
| 2009–present | Emmerdale | Jai Sharma | Series regular |

== Awards and nominations ==
| Year | Award | Category | Result | Ref. |
|---|---|---|---|---|
| 2021 | 26th National Television Awards | Serial Drama Performance | Longlisted | |
