= Jamaica Inn (disambiguation) =

Jamaica Inn is a free house in Cornwall, England.

Jamaica Inn may also refer to:

- Jamaica Inn (novel), a novel by Daphne du Maurier
- Jamaica Inn (film), a 1939 film by Alfred Hitchcock
- Jamaica Inn (1983 TV series), a British television series
- Jamaica Inn (2014 TV series), a British television series
- "Jamaica Inn", a song by Tori Amos from The Beekeeper
- Jamaica Inn, a UK radio programme
