= Dozmary Pool =

Lake in Cornwall, England

- Bolla Meri (Cornish)
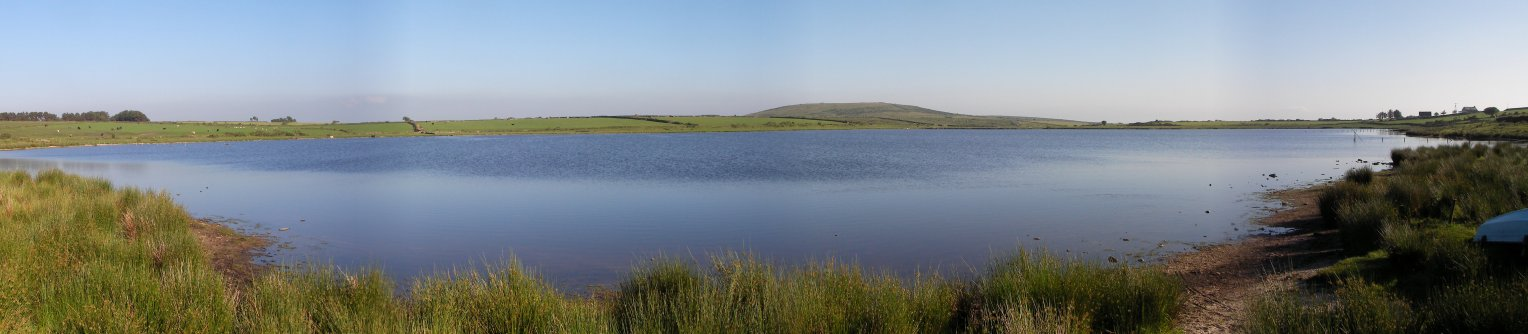
- Dozmary Pool

- Map showing the location of Dozmary Pool within Cornwall.
- Location: Bodmin Moor, Cornwall
- Coordinates: 50.5423°N 4.5502°W
- Basin countries: United Kingdom
- Surface area: 14.9 ha (37 acres)
- Shore length^{1}: 1.5 km (0.93 mi)
- Surface elevation: 268 m (879 ft)
- Islands: none
- ^{1} Shore length is not a well-defined measure.

Dozmary Pool (Cornish: Bolla Meri, meaning merry bowl) is a small lake, in the civil parish of Altarnun on Bodmin Moor, Cornwall, UK. It is situated 16.9 kilometres (10.5 mi) from the sea and lies about 15 kilometres (9.3 mi) north-east of Bodmin and 2 kilometres (1.2 mi) south of Bolventor. It originated in the post-glacial period. The outflow from the pool is into Colliford Lake and is therefore one of the sources of the River Fowey. In the past the name has been spelt as Dozmaré and as Dosmery Pool. The pool and surrounding area was designated a Site of Special Scientific Interest in 1951 for its biological interest and is within the Cornwall Area of Outstanding Natural Beauty (originally the Bodmin Moor AONB).

== Wildlife and ecology ==
The oligotrophic pool is important for its palynological record (or history) of the vegetation since the last ice-age. It is also part of a network of sites in south-west England for the reconstruction of vegetation history. In the fine granitic gravel on the bottom of the pool grows spring quillwort (Isoetes echinospora). At the time of designation in 1951 it was the only known site in Cornwall, but since 1988 has been found in three nearby pools. Growing on the margins of the pool is six-stamened waterwort (Elatine hexandra), a nationally scarce plant in the UK.

In 1602, Richard Carew describes the pool as a mile or more in circumference and nowhere more than 9 ft (2.7 m) deep. He tells how some gentlemen of the district experimented to see whether the pool contained fish and found only eels. A rare cladoceran, Drepanothrix dentata and a copepod, Diaptomus vierzejskii occur in good numbers. At the end of the 19th century, it was described by Sabine Baring-Gould as abounding in fish and surrounded by numerous remains of the working of flint in the Stone Age.

In 1951, at the time of designation of the Site of Special Scientific Interest, the pool was considered valuable for wintering birds and migrating wildfowl such as Eurasian coot (Fulica atra), Eurasian teal (Anas crecca) and Eurasian wigeon (Anas penelope). Since the opening of the Siblyback and Colliford reservoirs on Bodmin Moor, its relative importance has declined. Breeding birds around the pool include Eurasian curlew (Numenius arquata), dunlin (Calidris alpina), northern lapwing (Vanellus vanellus), common snipe (Gallinago gallinago) and European stonechat (Saxicola torquate).

== Legend and literature ==
Dozmary Pool is one site that is claimed to be the home of the Lady of the Lake. According to the legend, it is here that King Arthur rowed out to the Lady of the Lake and received the sword Excalibur. The pool is also claimed to be the place where Bedivere returned Excalibur as Arthur lay dying after the Battle of Camlann.

Another tale associated with Dozmary Pool is that of Jan Tregeagle. In search of deviant exploits, Tregeagle makes a deal with the Devil and is given money and power. At the conclusion of his life, he is damned to the bottomless Dozmary Pool, where he is tormented to this day; it is said that Tregeagle's ghost can still be heard howling across the moor. (He was set the task of dipping the water out of Dozmary Pool with a leaking limpet shell, but decided to escape to Roche Rock before being set another task, weaving ropes from the sand of Gwenor Cove). The legend of Tregeagle was particularly strong in the 19th century, although the belief that Dozmary Pool was bottomless was disproved when, in 1899, it dried up completely.

Sabine Baring-Gould included an extensive article on the witch's ladder in his novel Curgenven published in 1893. In his account the ladder was made of black wool, with white and brown thread, and at every two inches it was tied around cock's feathers. The maker would weave into it aches and pains and other ailments intended for the victim. The ladder was then thrown to the bottom of Dozmary Pool. They believed that as the bubbles rose to the top of the pond, the curse was released.

== Recreation ==
Perhaps because of the links to Arthurian legend, Dozmary Pool has long been considered a place to visit, although accessibility was poor until well into the 20th century. A Ward Lock travel guide from the 1920s says of it that 'A more out-of-the-way spot than Dozmary Pool could hardly be found in Great Britain' and describes the walk from Camelford Station as 'impossible'. For many years Dozmary Pool was the destination for the Sunday School outing from Bolventor Methodist chapel.

=== Cornish wrestling ===
Cornish wrestling tournaments, for prizes, have been held at Dozmary Pool.
