= Elatine ojibwayensis =

Scientific classification
- Kingdom: Plantae
- Clade: Tracheophytes
- Clade: Angiosperms
- Clade: Eudicots
- Clade: Rosids
- Order: Malpighiales
- Family: Elatinaceae
- Genus: Elatine
- Species: E. ojibwayensis

Binomial name
- Elatine ojibwayensis Garneau

Species of flowering plant

Elatine ojibwayensis, also known as the Ojibway waterwort, is a species of plant in the genus Elatine. It is endemic to Quebec, Canada. It is listed as critically imperiled by NatureServe.
