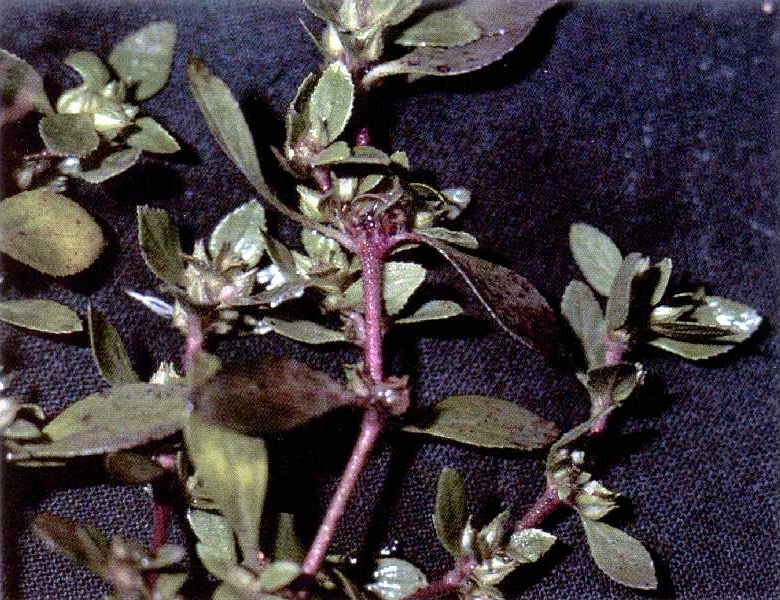

Conservation status
- Secure (NatureServe)

Scientific classification
- Kingdom: Plantae
- Clade: Tracheophytes
- Clade: Angiosperms
- Clade: Eudicots
- Clade: Rosids
- Order: Malpighiales
- Family: Elatinaceae
- Genus: Bergia
- Species: B. texana

Binomial name
- Bergia texana (Hook.) Seub.

Synonyms
- Elatine texana (Hook.) Torr. & A.Gray (1840); Merimea texana Hook. (1840)

= Bergia texana =

North American species of flowering plant in the waterwort family

Bergia texana is a species of flowering plant in the waterwort family known by the common name Texas bergia. It is native to the western and central United States and northern Mexico, where it is a plant of wetlands, living in mud and moist soils along the edges of rivers and pools. This is an annual or perennial herb producing a branching, glandular, hairy stem which grows upright or trailing up to 30 centimeters long. The leaves are 2 to 4 centimeters long, mainly oval in shape and pointed, and lightly toothed along the edges. The inflorescences appear at the tips of stem branches and in the leaf axils, bearing single flowers or small clusters. Each small flower has five green sepals and five greenish white petals. Some of the flowers open, while others are cleistogamous, remaining closed and self-pollinating. The fruit is an oval capsule with many seeds in each of its five chambers.
