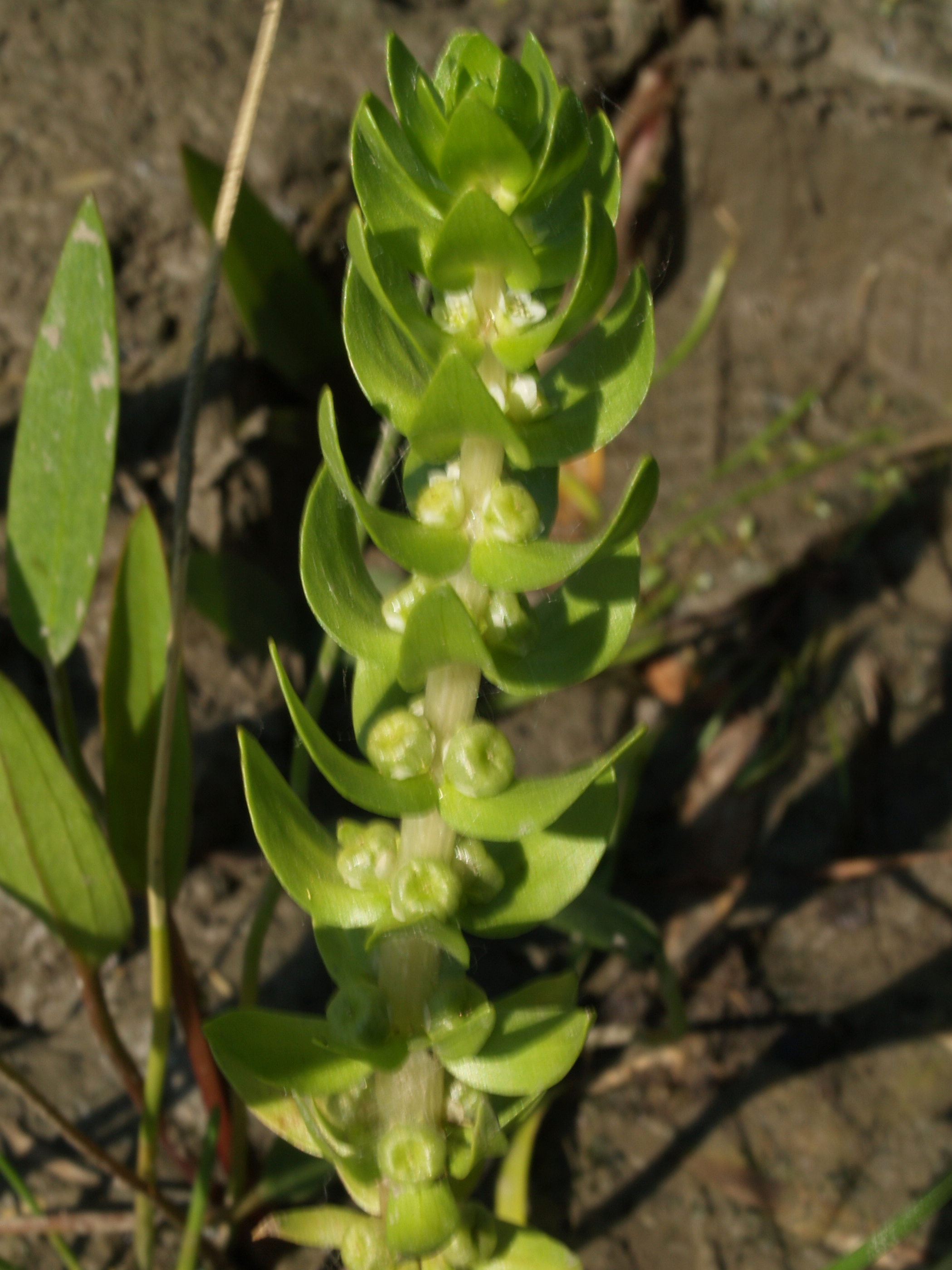

Scientific classification
- Kingdom: Plantae
- Clade: Tracheophytes
- Clade: Angiosperms
- Clade: Eudicots
- Clade: Rosids
- Order: Malpighiales
- Family: Elatinaceae
- Genus: Elatine
- Species: E. alsinastrum

Binomial name
- Elatine alsinastrum L.

= Elatine alsinastrum =

Species of flowering plant

Elatine alsinastrum is a member of the genus Elatine in the plant family Elatinaceae, the waterwort family.

== Distribution and habitat ==
It is found in Europe and is considered endangered. Populations have also been found in Turkey's Çanakkale Province.
