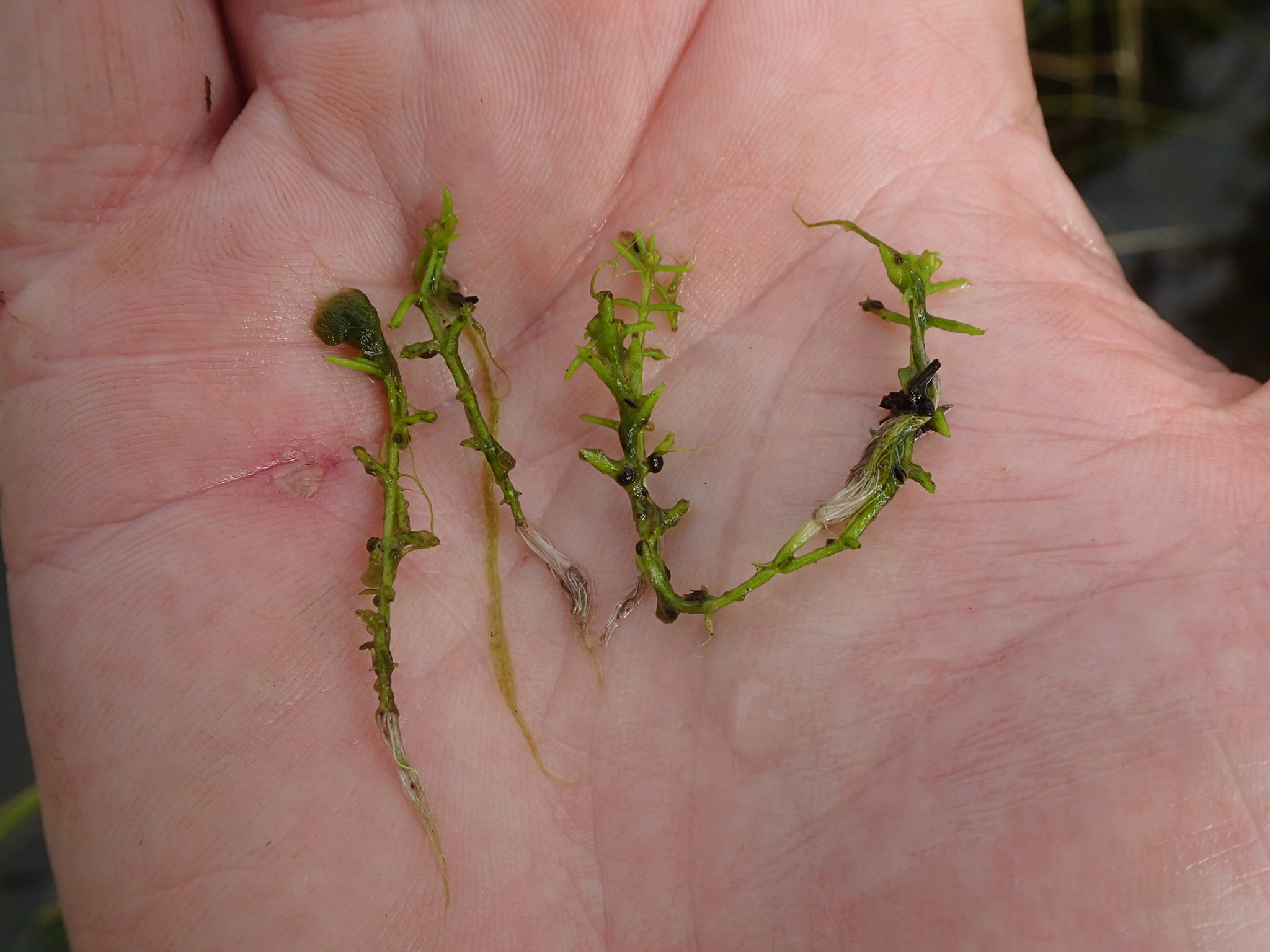

Conservation status
- Least Concern (IUCN 3.1)

- Secure (NatureServe)

Scientific classification
- Kingdom: Plantae
- Clade: Tracheophytes
- Clade: Angiosperms
- Clade: Eudicots
- Clade: Rosids
- Order: Malpighiales
- Family: Elatinaceae
- Genus: Elatine
- Species: E. minima

Binomial name
- Elatine minima (Nutt.) Fisch. & C.A.Mey.

= Elatine minima =

Species of flowering plant

Elatine minima is a species of flowering plant in the family Elatinaceae, native to eastern Canada (Newfoundland island, Nova Scotia, Ontario and Prince Edward Island), the north-central United States (Minnesota and Wisconsin), the northeastern United States (Connecticut, Massachusetts, Michigan, New Hampshire, New Jersey, New York state, Pennsylvania and Rhode Island), and the southeastern United States (Maryland, Tennessee, and Virginia). It was first described by Thomas Nuttall in 1817 as Crypta minima and transferred to Elatine in 1836.
