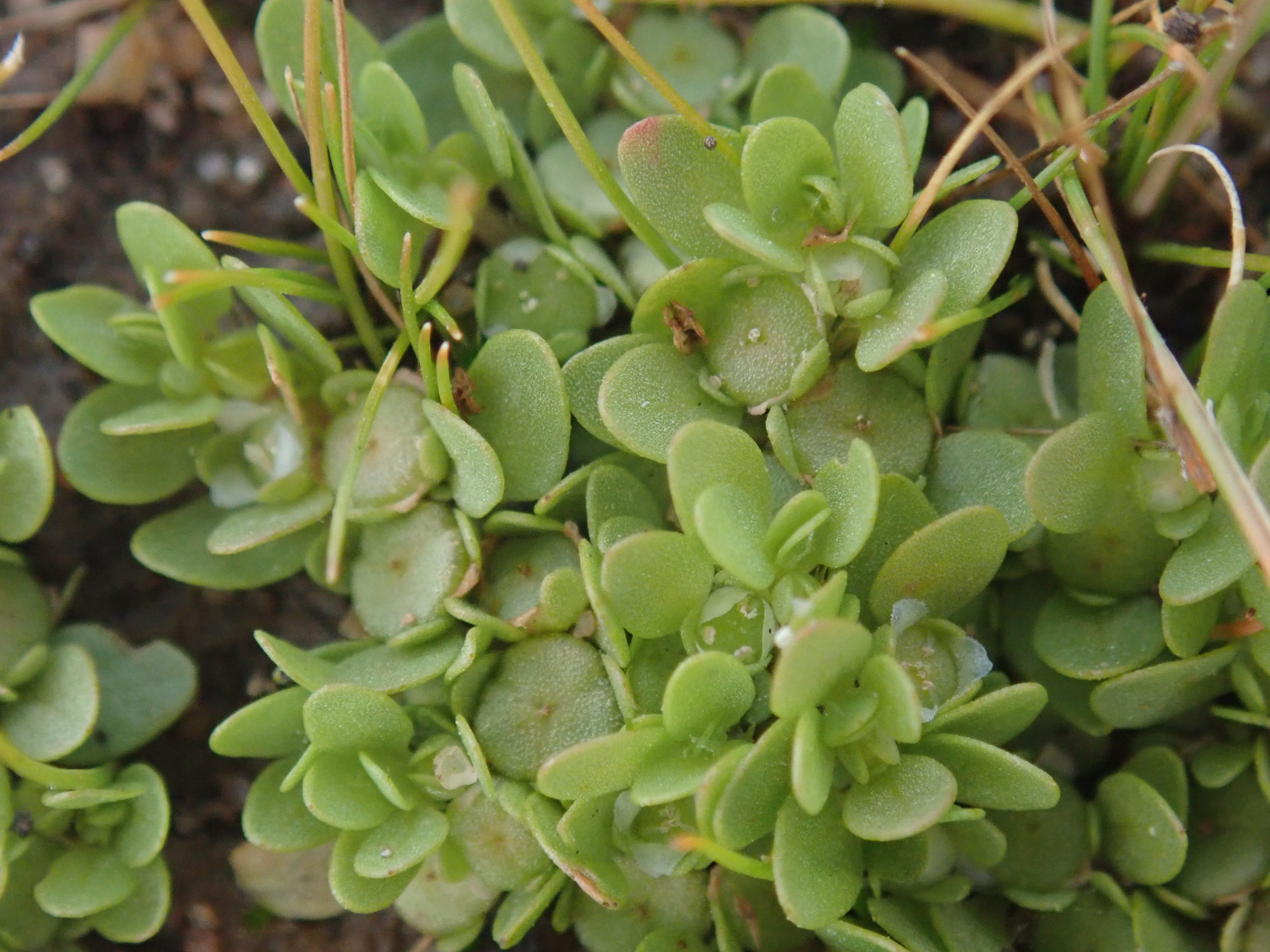

Scientific classification
- Kingdom: Plantae
- Clade: Tracheophytes
- Clade: Angiosperms
- Clade: Eudicots
- Clade: Rosids
- Order: Malpighiales
- Family: Elatinaceae
- Genus: Elatine
- Species: E. gratioloides

Binomial name
- Elatine gratioloides A.Cunn

Synonyms
- Elatine americana var. australiensis Benth.

= Elatine gratioloides =

Species of flowering plant

Elatine gratioloides is a species of flowering plant belonging to the family Elatinaceae.

Its native range is Australia to the south-west Pacific, including New Zealand.

It was first described in 1839 by Allan Cunningham, who described it from a specimen from "a bog at Tauraki, Hokianga river".
