= Elatine gussonei =

Scientific classification
- Kingdom: Plantae
- Clade: Tracheophytes
- Clade: Angiosperms
- Clade: Eudicots
- Clade: Rosids
- Order: Malpighiales
- Family: Elatinaceae
- Genus: Elatine
- Species: E. gussonei

Binomial name
- Elatine gussonei (Sommier) Brullo, Lanfr., Pavone & Ronsisv.

Species of plant

Elatine gussonei is a species of plant in the genus Elatine (waterworts). It is endemic to Malta.

== Sources ==
This article incorporates text from a free content work. Licensed under CC0 (license statement/permission). Text taken from Elatine gussonei. Encyclopedia of Life.
