= Elatine chilensis =

Scientific classification
- Kingdom: Plantae
- Clade: Tracheophytes
- Clade: Angiosperms
- Clade: Eudicots
- Clade: Rosids
- Order: Malpighiales
- Family: Elatinaceae
- Genus: Elatine
- Species: E. chilensis

Binomial name
- Elatine chilensis Gay

Species of flowering plant

Elatine chilensis is a species of flowering plant in the family Elatinaceae. According to Plants of the World Online, this species is native to Chile, Argentina and Bolivia, and has been introduced to the United States, specifically in Arizona, California, Nevada, New Mexico, Oregon and Washington. In Chile, it is distributed from the Santiago Metropolitan region to the Los Lagos regions.
