= Elatine spathulata =

Scientific classification
- Kingdom: Plantae
- Clade: Tracheophytes
- Clade: Angiosperms
- Clade: Eudicots
- Clade: Rosids
- Order: Malpighiales
- Family: Elatinaceae
- Genus: Elatine
- Species: E. spathulata

Binomial name
- Elatine spathulata Gorski

Synonyms
- Alsinastrum orthospermum (Düben) Rupr.; Elatine orthosperma Düben

Species of flowering plant

Elatine spathulata is a species of flowering plant belonging to the family Elatinaceae.

Its native range is Northern Europe to Germany and Russian Far East.
