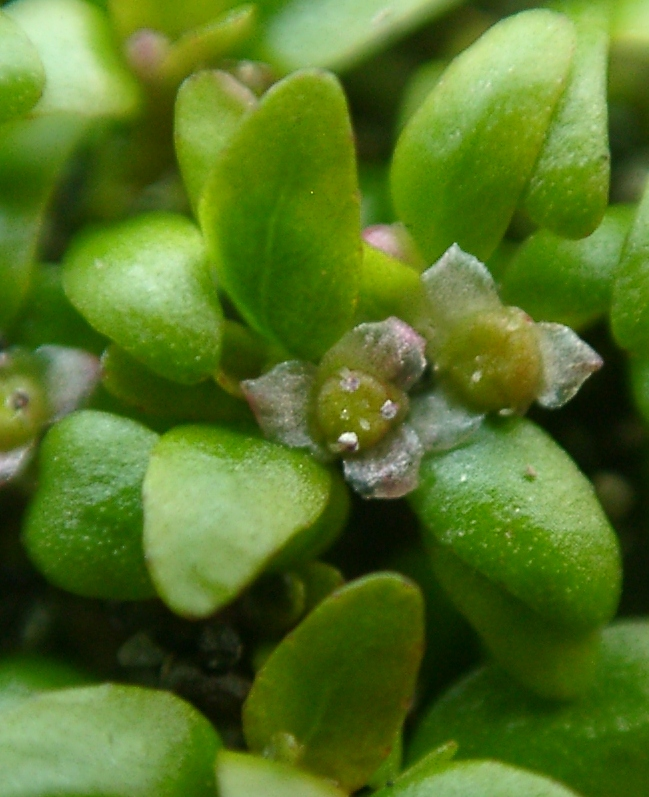
- Elatine triandra flower

Conservation status
- Secure (NatureServe)

Scientific classification
- Kingdom: Plantae
- Clade: Tracheophytes
- Clade: Angiosperms
- Clade: Eudicots
- Clade: Rosids
- Order: Malpighiales
- Family: Elatinaceae
- Genus: Elatine
- Species: E. triandra

Binomial name
- Elatine triandra Schkuhr.

= Elatine triandra =

Species of flowering plant

Elatine triandra is a species of flowering plant belonging to the family Elatinaceae. It is known by the common name longstem waterwort.

Its native range is Temperate and Subtropical Old World to Western Malesia.

In New England, it's regarded as introduced and has been documented in both Massachusetts and Maine and it is found primarily around rivers.
