= Jamaica Inn (1983 TV series) =

- Genre: Drama
- Based on: Jamaica Inn by Daphne du Maurier
- Screenplay by: Derek Marlowe
- Directed by: Lawrence Gordon Clark
- Starring: Jane Seymour; Patrick McGoohan; Trevor Eve
- Music by: Francis Shaw
- Country of origin: United Kingdom
- Original language: English
- No. of series: 1
- No. of episodes: 3

Production
- Producer: Peter Graham Scott
- Editor: Geoff Shepherd
- Running time: 99 minutes
- Production companies: HTV West; BBJ International

Original release
- Network: ITV
- Release: 9 May – 10 May 1983

Jamaica Inn is a 1983 British television miniseries adapted from the 1936 novel Jamaica Inn by Daphne du Maurier. It is a gothic period piece of piracy, smuggling and murder set in northeastern Cornwall, England in the early 19th century. The series dramatizes the cultural trope of wreckers, clipper ship era pirates who employed various deceptions including mislocated lights, to lure ships to their doom on irregular rugged shorelines for subsequent plundering. It stars Jane Seymour, Patrick McGoohan and Trevor Eve and was directed by Lawrence Gordon Clark.

== Setting ==
The production is set in Cornwall, England in the early 19th century, centered on a free house, 'Jamaica Inn' in Bodmin Moor near modern Bolventor.

== Plot ==
When her seafaring husband dies in the destruction of his sailing ship by wreckers on the Cornish coast in the early 1800s, the shock causes Martha Yellan's mental health to deteriorate. She plans to send her daughter Mary to stay with Martha's sister Patience. Shortly thereafter, Martha dies. Mary leaves her home town of Helston. Patience has married Joss Merlyn, the innkeeper of Jamaica Inn, located on a lonely stretch of road in Bodmin Moor. Mary quickly finds out that Patience lives in fear of her husband, who turns violent when drunk and whose regular guests include ruffians and criminals. She also discovers that illegal activity is going on, with goods loaded on wagons at night. Her uncle threatens one of his consorts, who may later have been killed based on a conversation Mary overhears between her uncle and someone who may be the leader of the criminal gang.

When a wagon transporting prisoners scheduled for execution suffers a breakdown near the inn, a young man helps the prisoners escape. Mary notices this but conceals it from the guards. He eventually turns out to be Jem, Joss’ younger brother, a horse thief.

Later, when she takes a walk over the moor, Mary encounters the vicar of Altarnun, the reverend Francis Davey, who escorts her back to the inn. Visiting him later at his church she finds out that he is much interested in local lore and mythology. Mary confides in him what she has learned of illegal activity at the inn. However, she only later learns the whole truth about their wrecking activity when her uncle confesses to it in a drunken stupor.

On Christmas Eve Jem and Mary go to the market at Launceston together and have a good time but he then fails to pick her up with his cart. Mary is forced to walk home across the moor in driving rain and is discovered by Davey. Mary informs him that her uncle is a wrecker. Davey sends her back to the inn in his coach but on the way it is intercepted by the wreckers, led by Joss. The wreckers take Mary with them to the coast where she witnesses a ship wreck and the subsequent attack on the survivors. The wreckers then return to the inn.

Mary wakes up to find Joss has locked up the inn and sits waiting with a gun. She manages to escape the inn and goes to Altarnun, where she leaves a message for Davey, who is not home. Mary also fails to meet the local squire/magistrate Bassatt at his home. However, his men accompany her back to the inn, where they find both her aunt and her uncle murdered. Bassatt and Davey show up at the inn, and Davey offers to take Mary in. At his home, she discovers paintings by him that show the two of them in a Druidic ceremony. They also prominently feature a Celtic symbol she recognizes as the one worn by the leader of the outlaw band.

Meanwhile, the vicar has rejoined the squire and Jem and learns that the latter found a brand new horseshoe in the heather near the inn and plans to have its owner, the likely murderer, identified by the local smith. Davey returns home and confesses to Mary to being the secret leader of the wreckers. He believes himself to be a reborn druid, and takes Mary, whom he has fallen in love with, to a standing stone overlooking the cliffs. The pursuers, following blood hounds, close in and Jem offers Davey a choice between jumping off the cliff and being shot by him. Davey jumps.

After recovering from the ordeal, Mary says she wants to return to a respectable life at Helston and not become completely dependent on a man like her mother did. Jem wants to go wherever his path takes him and they say goodbye. However, at the last moment Mary changes her mind and lets the stage coach depart with her luggage. She jumps on Jem's cart and they drive off together.

== Cast ==
- Jane Seymour – Mary Yellan
- Patrick McGoohan – Joss Merlyn, Aunt Patience's husband
- Trevor Eve – Jeremiah "Jem" Merlyn, Joss's younger brother
- John McEnery – Reverend Francis Davey, vicar of the local parish
- Billie Whitelaw – Aunt Patience, Martha's sister
- Vivian Pickles – Martha Yellan, Mary's mother
- Peter Vaughan – Squire Bassatt, the local magistrate

== Production ==
- HTV West (ITV)
- BBJ International

=== Filming locations ===
Pentireglaze, Cornwall, England, UK

Polzeath, Cornwall, England, UK

Port Quin, Cornwall, England, UK

Brent Tor, a moorland rock outcropping in Devon, England (northeast of Cornwall, the setting of the film), was used in a scene in which Mary Yellan visits the Reverend at his church.

== Broadcast ==
The production was originally broadcast as a two episode program in Britain totalling 187 minutes. Later, it was edited down to 150 minutes to fit in a 3-hour timeslot with 30 minutes of advertising for the U.S. market; it was also divided into three parts, the second and third parts constituting the original second episode.

== See also ==
- Jamaica Inn (film), a film adaptation directed by Alfred Hitchcock
- Jamaica Inn (2014 TV series), a television adaptation by the BBC
