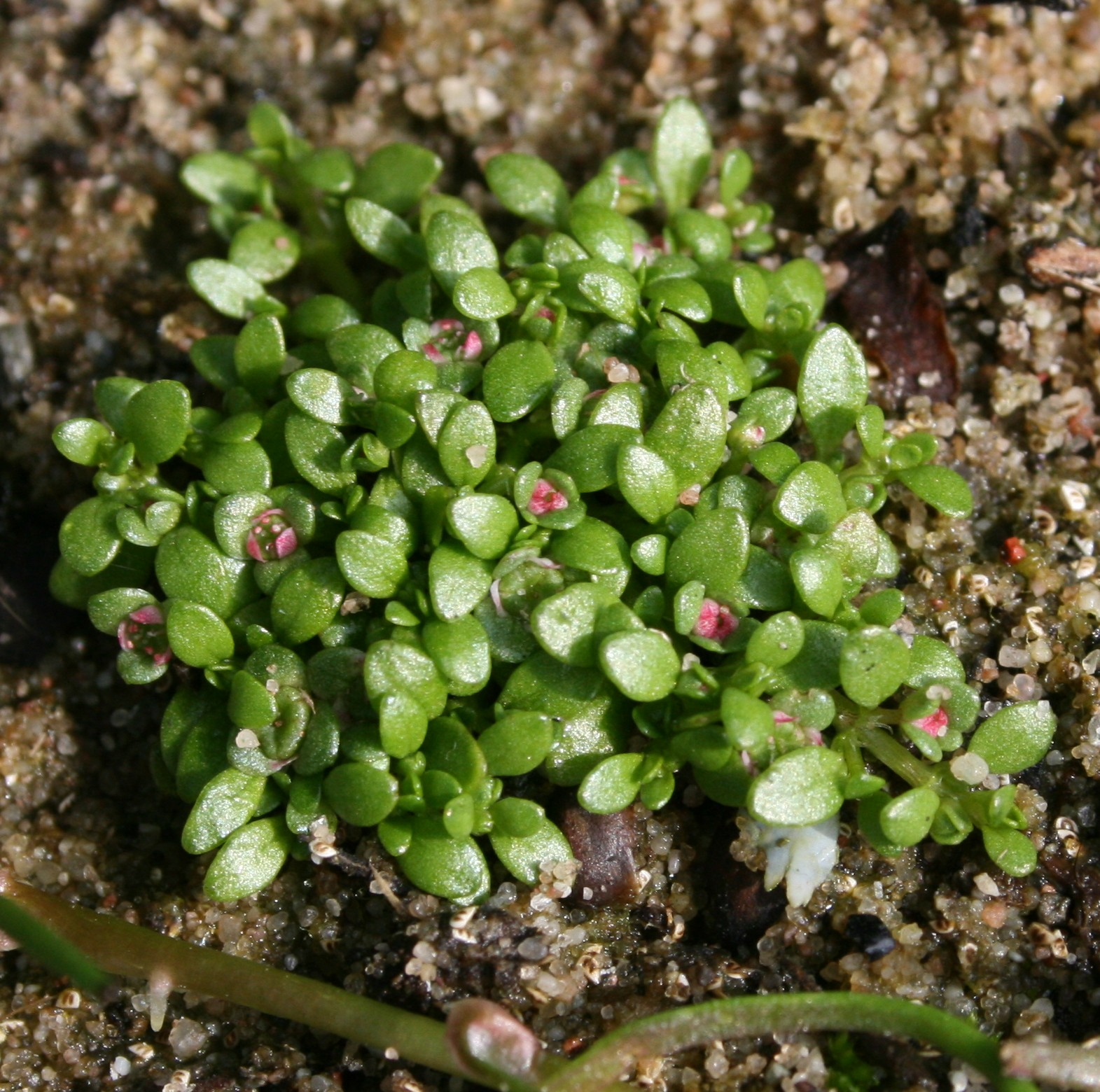

Conservation status
- Least Concern (IUCN 3.1)

Scientific classification
- Kingdom: Plantae
- Clade: Tracheophytes
- Clade: Angiosperms
- Clade: Eudicots
- Clade: Rosids
- Order: Malpighiales
- Family: Elatinaceae
- Genus: Elatine
- Species: E. hexandra

Binomial name
- Elatine hexandra (Lapierre) DC.]

= Elatine hexandra =

Species of flowering plant

Elatine hexandra, the six-stamened waterwort, is a species of flowering plant in the family Elatinaceae, which grows in shallow water around lakes and pools in Europe from Ireland to Romania. It is declining due to drainage and water pollution and is therefore protected in several countries.

== Description ==
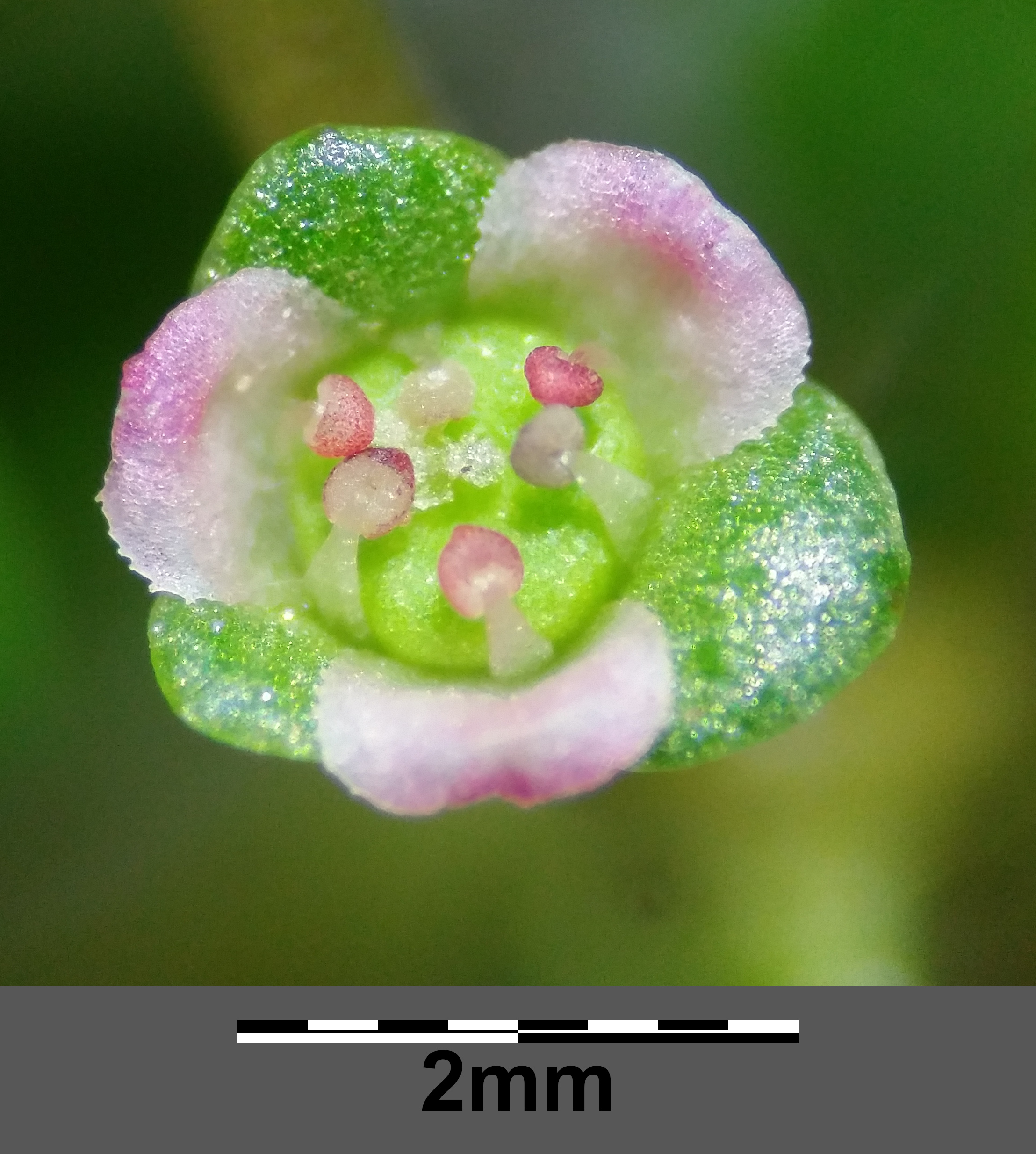
Detail of the flower

Six-stamened waterwort is a small annual to short-lived perennial herb with creeping stems up to about 8 cm long, which root at the nodes. It is entirely glabrous, with opposite pairs of elliptical to spathulate leaves about 7 mm long, which are borne on short petioles. At the tip of each leaf is a tiny, black hydathode. There are also minute stipules at the base of the leaf stalks. The stems and leaves are usually yellowy-green under water, becoming bright green or reddish when exposed on bare mud.

The flowers are usually solitary or sometimes in short cymes arising at the leaf nodes. Each flower has three (sometimes 4) sepals and the same number of pinkish-white petals. There are six stamens and 3-5 styles. The flower stalks (pedicels) elongate as the fruit matures, bearing a capsule with four valves. The seeds are cylindrical, brownish, up to about 0.7 mm long and slightly curved.

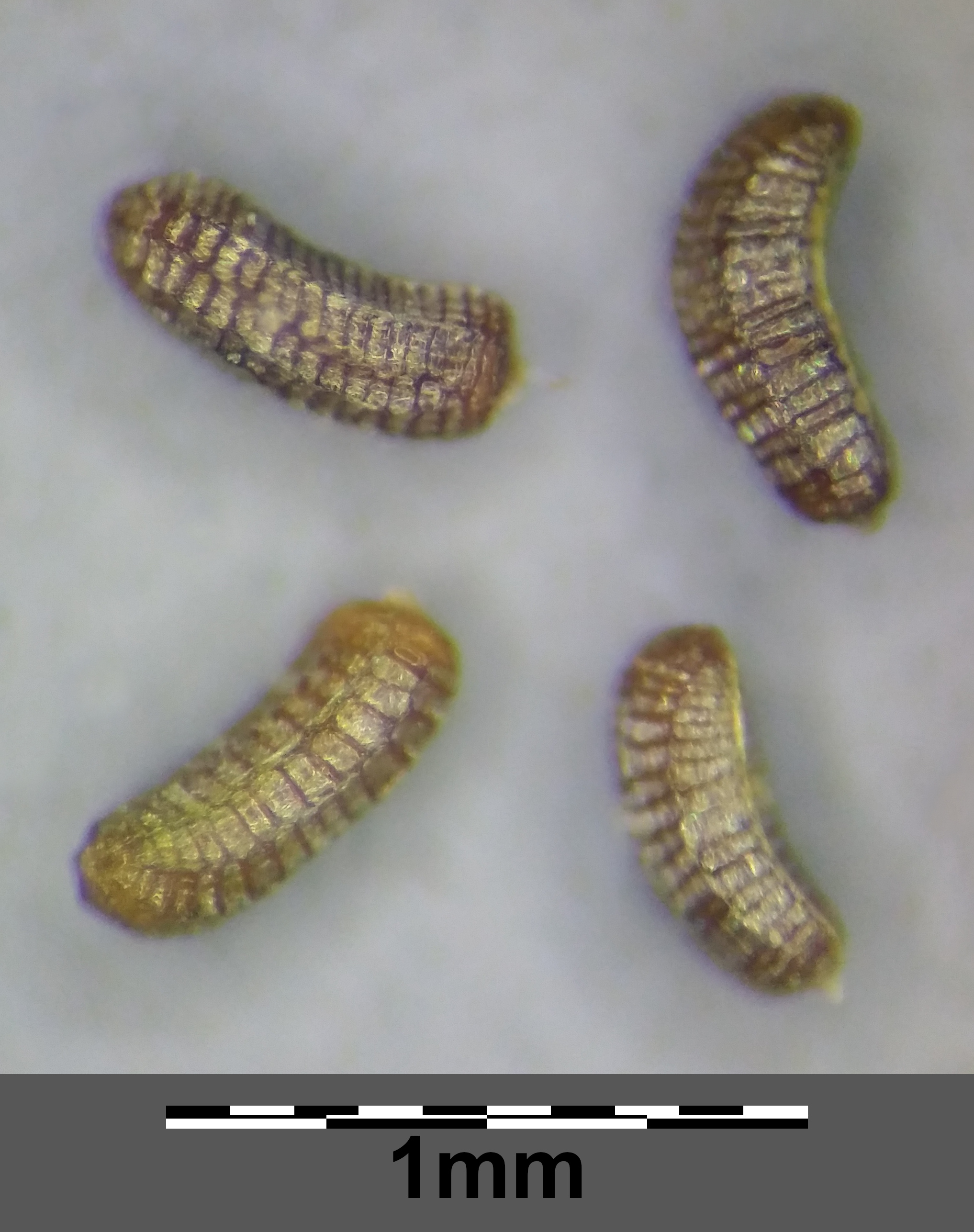
The seeds are cylindrical and slightly curved

== Identification ==
In Britain and Northern Europe it is most likely to be confused with Elatine hydropiper, but that species has no (or very short) pedicels and strongly curved (horseshoe-shaped) fruit. The numbers of the flower parts is less reliable, as E. hexandra does occasionally have 4 sepals, 4 petals and 8 stamens (rather than 3, 3 and 6), as does E. hydropiper.

== Taxonomy ==
The scientific name Elatine hexandra was published by de Candolle and Lamarck in their work Flore Française (3rd edition, vol. 5, p. 609) in 1805. Jean Marie Lapierre (1754-1834), in 1802, had named it Tillaea hexandra but de Candolle realised that this was the wrong genus (Tillaea is now included in Crassula).

It has no recognised subspecies and it is not known to hybridise with any other plants.

The scientific name is derived from the Ancient Greek word for a silver fir, Ἐλάτη (Elátē), which also means an oar, as ship parts were usually made of this light, strong wood. It probably alludes to the shape of the leaves. The specific epithet hexandra is simply Greek for "six stamens".

== Distribution and status ==
The range of six-stamened waterwort extends throughout Europe, possibly just into North Africa and westwards to the Azores. The eastward limit is in Poland and Romania.

Sites where this species occur are generally lowland, although it has been found as high as 440 m at Lough Ferta in Ireland, and 425 m at Llyn Gynon in Wales. An old record of it at 490 m in Scotland has never been verified.

Its conservation status, globally, is Least Concern, but there are regions such as Picardy and Île-de-France, where it is considered to be rare and threatened.

In all the British counties where it is found, it is considered to be an axiophyte, or plant of conservation importance, owing to its affinity for low-nutrient water bodies.

== Habitat and ecology ==
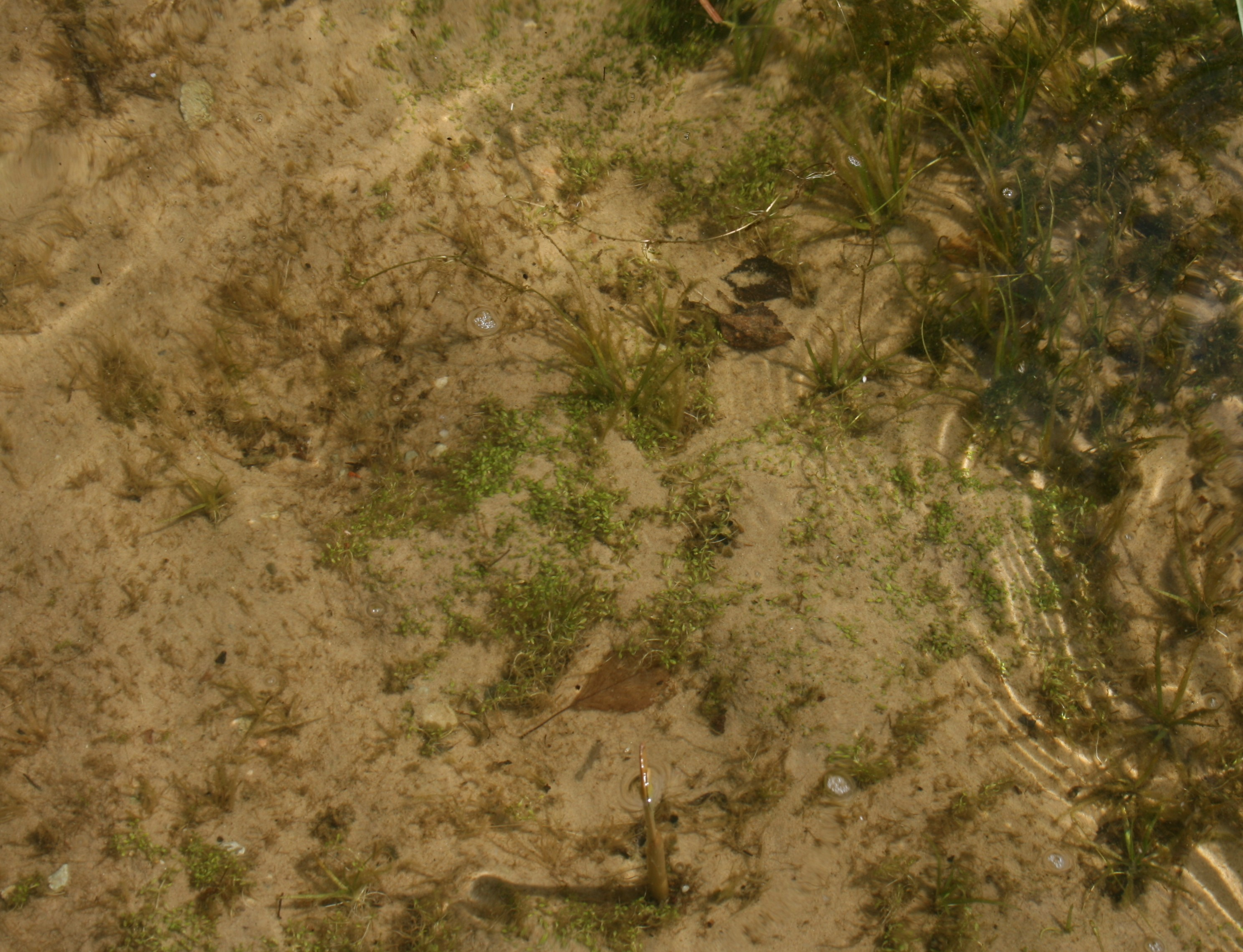
Habitat of six-stamened waterwort in a sandy pool

This is a plant of clear-water lakes and pools, usually with slightly acidic water and low levels of fertility. Its Ellenberg values in Britain are L=7, F=10, R=5, N=4, and S=0. It has been found at depths up to 3 m in very clear conditions, but is more normally found around in water about 10 cm deep.

When growing submerged, the flowers are cleistogamous, remaining closed up and self-pollinating. When a plant is exposed on bare mud in the summer, however, the flowers open in the normal way and are pollinated by insects. Its fruiting biology was studied by Salisbury in 1964, who found that a typical seed capsule contained about 36 seeds (roughly 12 in each of the 3 sections), but that flowers with 4 carpels could produce as many as 79 seeds. He calculated that a single plant could produce as many as 27,000 seeds if it was growing on exposed mud, but much fewer if self-pollinating under water, which shows how it is adapted to react quickly to favourable conditions in an occasional dry summer. Seed germination rates were also strongly linked to exposure to bright sunlight. The seeds do not float, but can remain viable under water or buried for many years.

== Uses ==
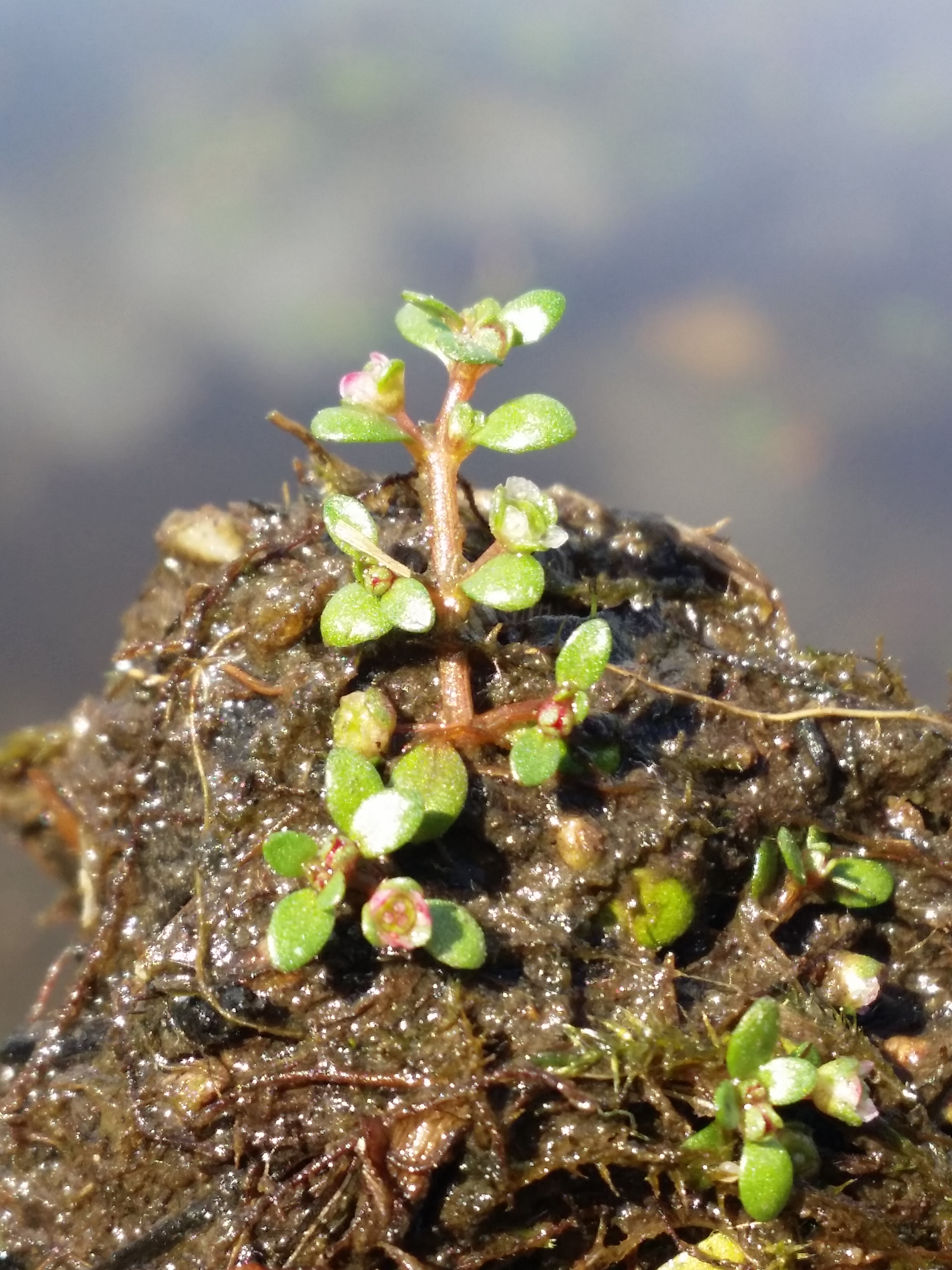
The leaves are in opposite pairs and somewhat paddle-shaped.

This is a useful plant to keep in aquariums, as it is fast-growing but small.
