= Jan Tregeagle =

British magistrate

Jan Tregeagle was a magistrate in the early 17th century, a steward under the Duchy of Cornwall, and was known for being particularly harsh; darker stories circulated as well, that he had murdered his wife or made a pact with the Devil. As a lawyer, he was a peculiarly evil agent, and very hard upon the tenants.

Many legends have grown up around him, and he has evolved into Cornwall's version of Faust, having bargained his soul for power, fame and success. One story goes that sometime after his death, a case was going through the courts in which the defendant had illegally obtained some land. The defendant, sure that the dead Tregeagle could not testify against him, cried, "If Tregeagle ever saw it, I wish to God he would come and declare it!" To the court's astonishment, Tregeagle materialised in the witness box and testified that he had forged some crucial document or other. Justice having been done, the court would not countenance sending him back to Hell, and so set him a series of impossible tasks to while away the time until Judgment Day. He was set the task of dipping the water out of Dozmary Pool with a limpet shell, but decided to escape to Roche Rock before being set another task, weaving ropes from the sand of Gwenor Cove.

Tregeagle's dismal fate inspired "The Ballad of the Haunted Moor", in which "the soul Tregeagle, a deathless soul/Flies from the Pool with a shriek, a shriek!"

The manor house Tregeagle lived in was said to be haunted after his death, with the new occupants returning home one night to discover a riotous party attended by spirits in antique dress. The ghostly attendees vanished as soon as the front door was opened, leaving no trace.
