= Holy Trinity Church, Bolventor =

Church in Cornwall, England

Holy Trinity Church
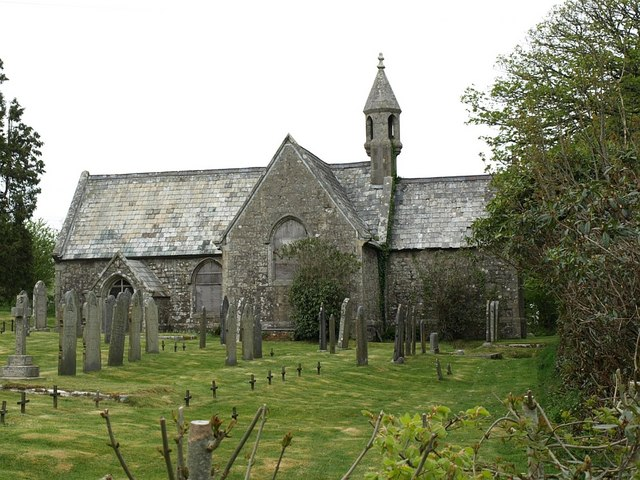
- Holy Trinity Church

Religion
- Affiliation: Church of England
- Ecclesiastical or organizational status: Closed
- Year consecrated: 1848

Location
- Location: Bolventor, Cornwall, England
- Interactive map of Holy Trinity Church
- Coordinates: 50.5744°N 4.5475°W

Architecture
- Type: Church
- Location within Cornwall

Listed Building – Grade II
- Official name: Holy Trinity Church
- Designated: 23 November 1988
- Reference no.: 1328081

Holy Trinity Church is a former Church of England church in Bolventor, Cornwall, England, UK. It was built in 1846–48 and served as the parish church of Bolventor until its closure in 1981. The church has been Grade II listed since 1988.

== History ==
With the formation of Bolventor as a parish in 1846, plans were made for a church capable of accommodating 150 persons. The foundation stone was laid in July 1846 by the church's builder, Francis Rashleigh Rodd of Trebartha Hall and £100 was granted towards its construction by the Exeter Diocesan Church Building Society in 1847. The church, which cost £666 to build, was consecrated by the Bishop of Exeter, Henry Phillpotts, on 7 July 1848.

A restoration of the church was completed in 1965. Due to a decline in congregation numbers, Holy Trinity closed in June 1981. It was later acquired by private owners in 2011, who were granted planning permission that year to transform the former church into a residence. With a partial conversion carried out, the church was sold again in 2018.
