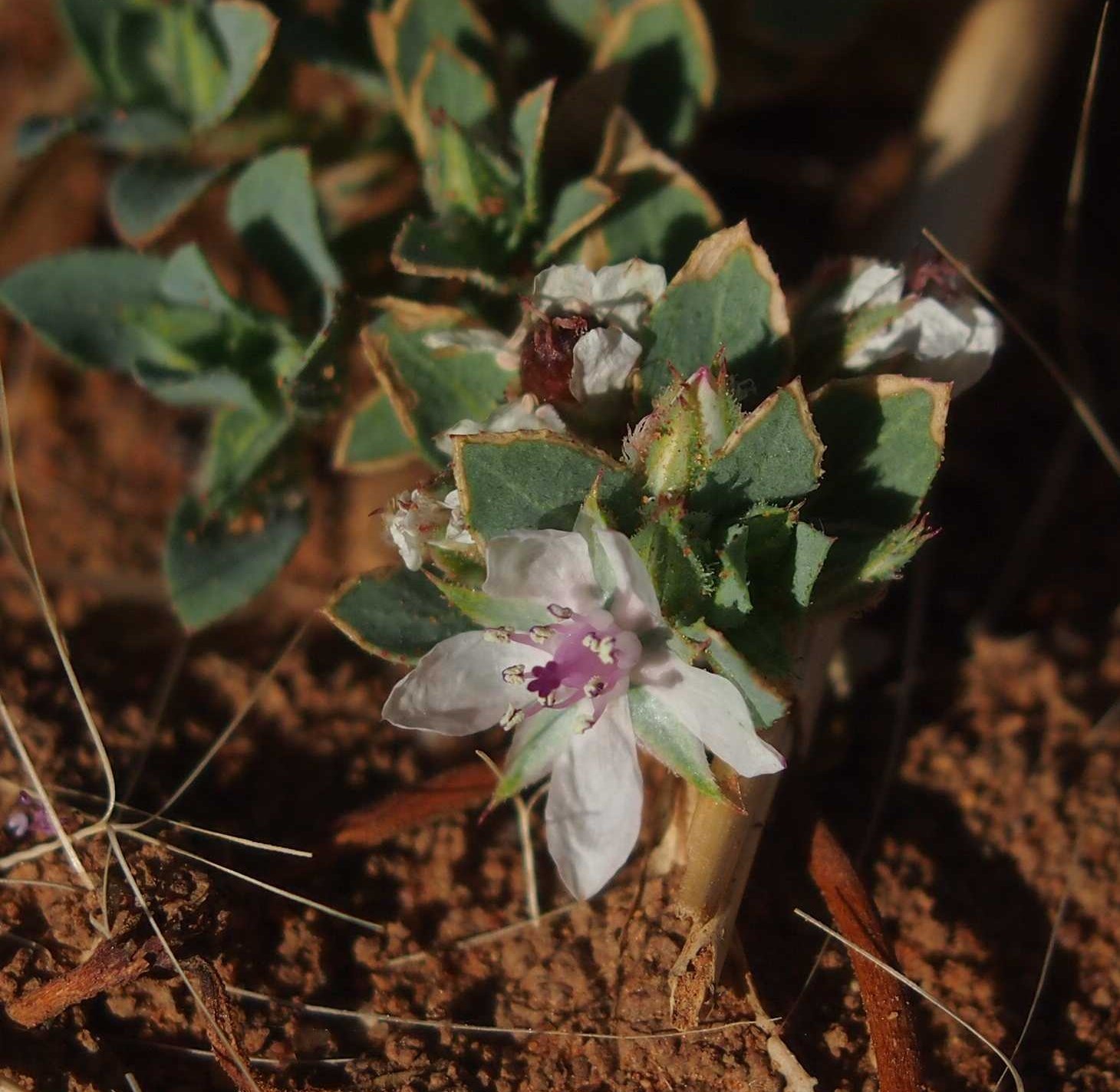
- Bergia henshallii

Scientific classification
- Kingdom: Plantae
- Clade: Tracheophytes
- Clade: Angiosperms
- Clade: Eudicots
- Clade: Rosids
- Order: Malpighiales
- Family: Elatinaceae
- Genus: Bergia; L.

Species
- 20 to 25 - see text

= Bergia =

Genus of flowering plants

Bergia is one of the two genera of plants composing the waterwort family, Elatinaceae. These are tropical to subtropical plants and sometimes aquatic in nature.

Species include:

- Bergia ammannioides
- Bergia aquatica
- Bergia auriculata
- Bergia capensis
- Bergia decumbens
- Bergia glutinosa
- Bergia henshallii
- Bergia pedicellaris
- Bergia pentherana
- Bergia perennis
- Bergia polyantha
- Bergia pusilla
- Bergia serrata
- Bergia suffruticosa
- Bergia texana
