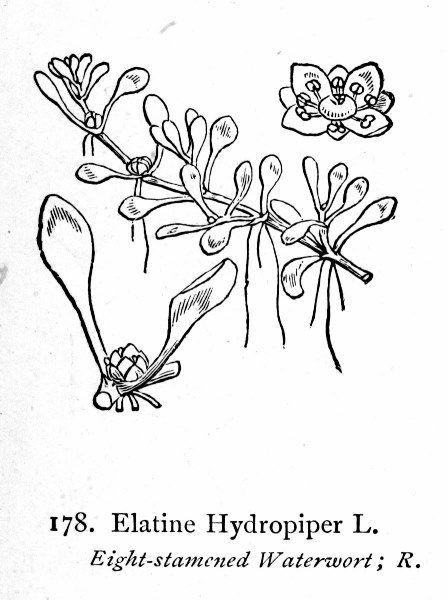

Scientific classification
- Kingdom: Plantae
- Clade: Tracheophytes
- Clade: Angiosperms
- Clade: Eudicots
- Clade: Rosids
- Order: Malpighiales
- Family: Elatinaceae
- Genus: Elatine
- Species: E. hydropiper

Binomial name
- Elatine hydropiper L.

= Elatine hydropiper =

Eight-stamened Waterwort

Species of plant

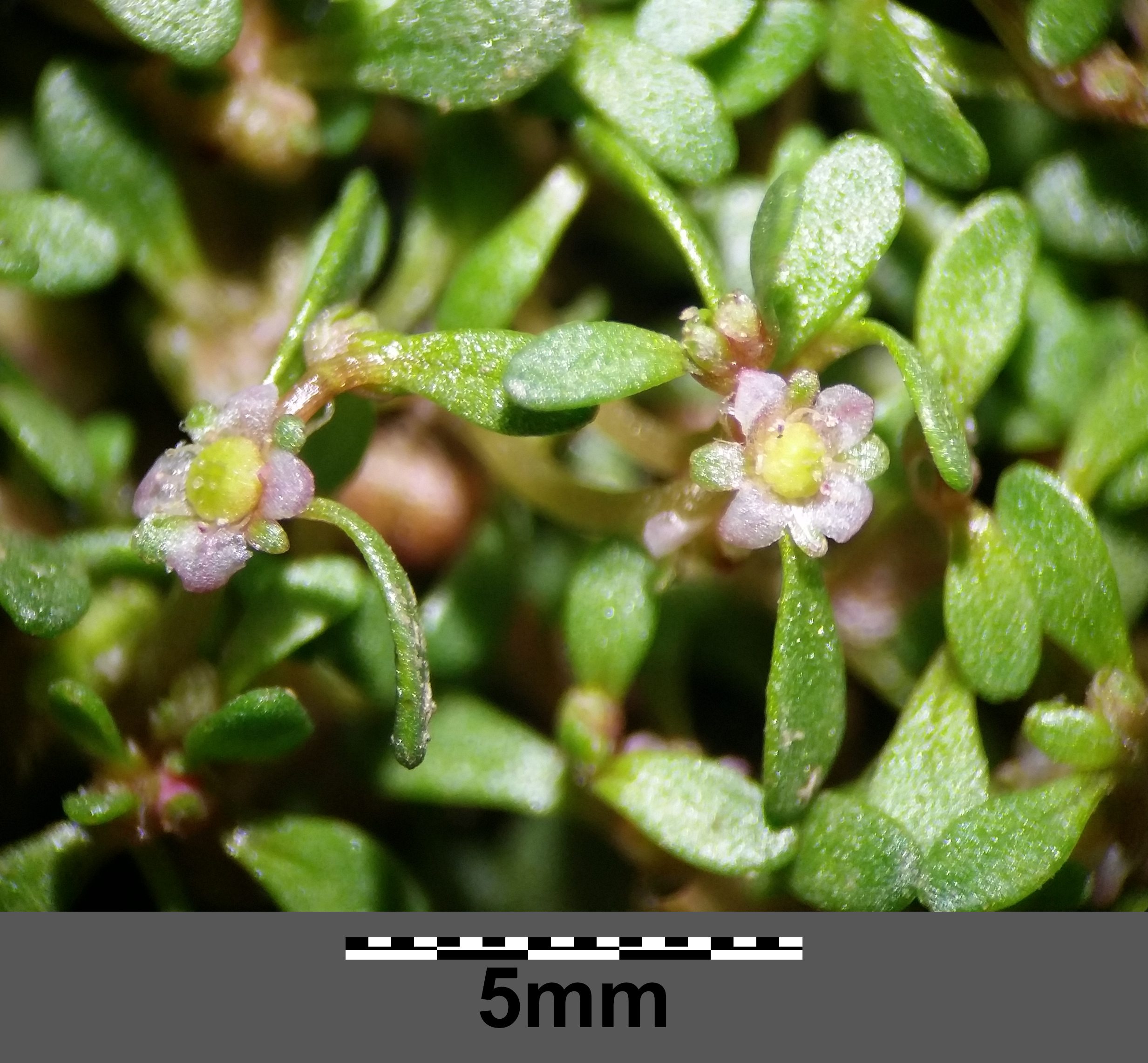
Flowering Elatine hydropiper

Elatine hydropiper, known as the eight-stamened waterwort, is a species of flowering plant belonging to the family Elatinaceae.

Its native range is Europe to Russian Far East.

Distribution map of Elatine hydropiper in Poland (in regions) (source: A. Zając & M. Zając (red.)

It was first described by Swedish botanist Carl Linnaeus in 1753.
