= Bolventor =

Hamlet in Cornwall, England

Coordinates: 50°33′44″N 4°33′56″W

Bolventor: Cornish: Bedhashardh
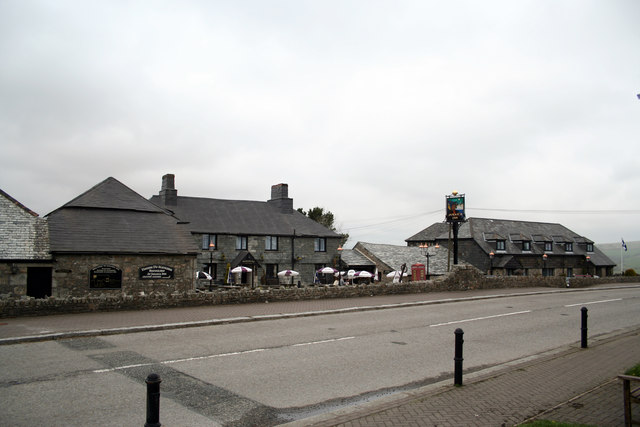
- Jamaica Inn from the old A30

- Location within Cornwall
- OS grid reference: SX184767
- Civil parish: Altarnun
- Shire county: Cornwall
- Region: South West
- Country: England
- Sovereign state: United Kingdom
- Post town: Launceston
- Postcode district: PL15
- Dialling code: 01566
- Police: Devon and Cornwall
- Fire: Cornwall
- Ambulance: South Western
- UK Parliament: North Cornwall

Bolventor (Cornish: Bedhashardh) is a hamlet on Bodmin Moor in Cornwall, England, United Kingdom. It is situated in Altarnun civil parish between Launceston and Bodmin.

== Toponymy ==
The hamlet has been said to take its name from the 'bold venture' that it must have appeared to build a farm in this moorland, but this is probably folk etymology, as bol- is a common prefix in Cornish placenames. It is much more likely that the name derives from the 'Bold Adventure' tin-working area which was in operation near Jamaica Inn during the 1840s-1850s

== Jamaica Inn ==
Bolventor is the location of the famous Jamaica Inn, a coaching inn. It is bypassed by a dual carriageway section of the A30 trunk road; before the bypass was built the hamlet straddled the A30.

Daphne du Maurier, a former resident, chose Bolventor as the setting for her novel about Cornish smugglers titled Jamaica Inn. The inn that inspired the novel, Jamaica Inn, has stood beside the main road through the village since 1547.

== Church ==
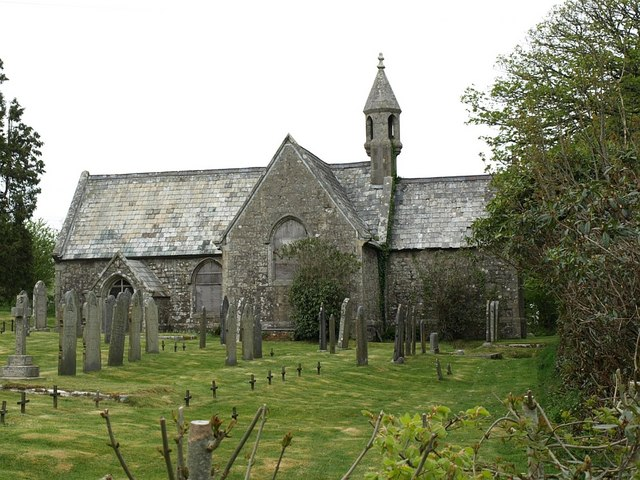
Holy Trinity Church, Bolventor

The former Holy Trinity Church that lies to the east of the hamlet closed some years ago. A mile from Bolventor there was a chapel of St Luke (from the 13th to the early 16th century): the font is now at the church of Tideford. Bolventor parish was established in 1846 (before that date the village was in St Neot parish; the new parish was made up of parts of St Neot, Altarnun and Cardinham parishes) but has now been merged with Altarnun.

== 1945 air disaster ==
On 14 September 1945 a Royal Air Force Handley Page Halifax Mk VII (PN305) was operating a flight from RAF Tarrant Rushton, Dorset, to Lajes Field, Azores, Portugal. During the flight an electrical failure occurred causing a dingy inside the wing to inflate dislodge from stowage. The dingy wrapped around the tail assembly and the aircraft went into a nose dive, crashing into the Priddacombe area of Bolventor. All 21 on board, seven crew and fourteen passengers, died in the crash.
