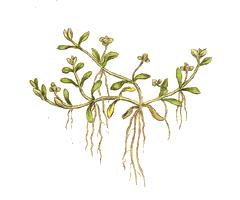
- Elatine hexandra

Scientific classification
- Kingdom: Plantae
- Clade: Tracheophytes
- Clade: Angiosperms
- Clade: Eudicots
- Clade: Rosids
- Order: Malpighiales
- Family: Elatinaceae
- Genus: Elatine; L.

Species
- About 25 - see text

= Elatine =

Genus of flowering plants in the waterwort family

Elatine is one of only two genera in the plant family Elatinaceae, the waterwort family. It contains about 25 species of aquatic plants known generally as waterworts. These are annual or perennial plants found in wet areas worldwide.

As of December 2021, Plants of the World Online accepted the following species:

- Elatine alsinastrum L.
- Elatine ambigua Wight - Asian waterwort
- Elatine americana (Pursh) Arn. - American waterwort
- Elatine brachysperma A.Gray - shortseed waterwort
- Elatine brochonii Clavaud
- Elatine californica A.Gray - California waterwort
- Elatine campylosperma Seub.
- Elatine chilensis Gay - Chilean waterwort
- Elatine ecuadoriensis Molau
- Elatine fassettiana Steyerm.
- Elatine fauquei Monod
- Elatine glaziovii Nied.
- Elatine gratioloides A.Cunn.
- Elatine gussonei (Sommier) Brullo, Lanfr., Pavone & Ronsisv.
- Elatine heterandra H.Mason - mosquito waterwort
- Elatine hexandra (Lapierre) DC. - six-stamen waterwort
- Elatine hungarica Moesz
- Elatine hydropiper L. - eight-stamen waterwort
- Elatine lindbergii Rohrb.
- Elatine lorentziana Hunz.
- Elatine macrocalyx Albr.
- Elatine macropoda Guss.
- Elatine madagascariensis H.Perrier
- Elatine minima (Nutt.) Fisch. & C.A.Mey. - small waterwort
- Elatine ojibwayensis Garneau
- Elatine paramoana Schmidt-M. & Bernal
- Elatine peruviana Baehni & J.F.Macbr.
- Elatine rubella Rydb. - southwestern waterwort
- Elatine spathulata Gorski
- Elatine triandra Schkuhr - three-stamen waterwort
