= Jamaica Inn =

Grade II listed pub on Bodmin Moor

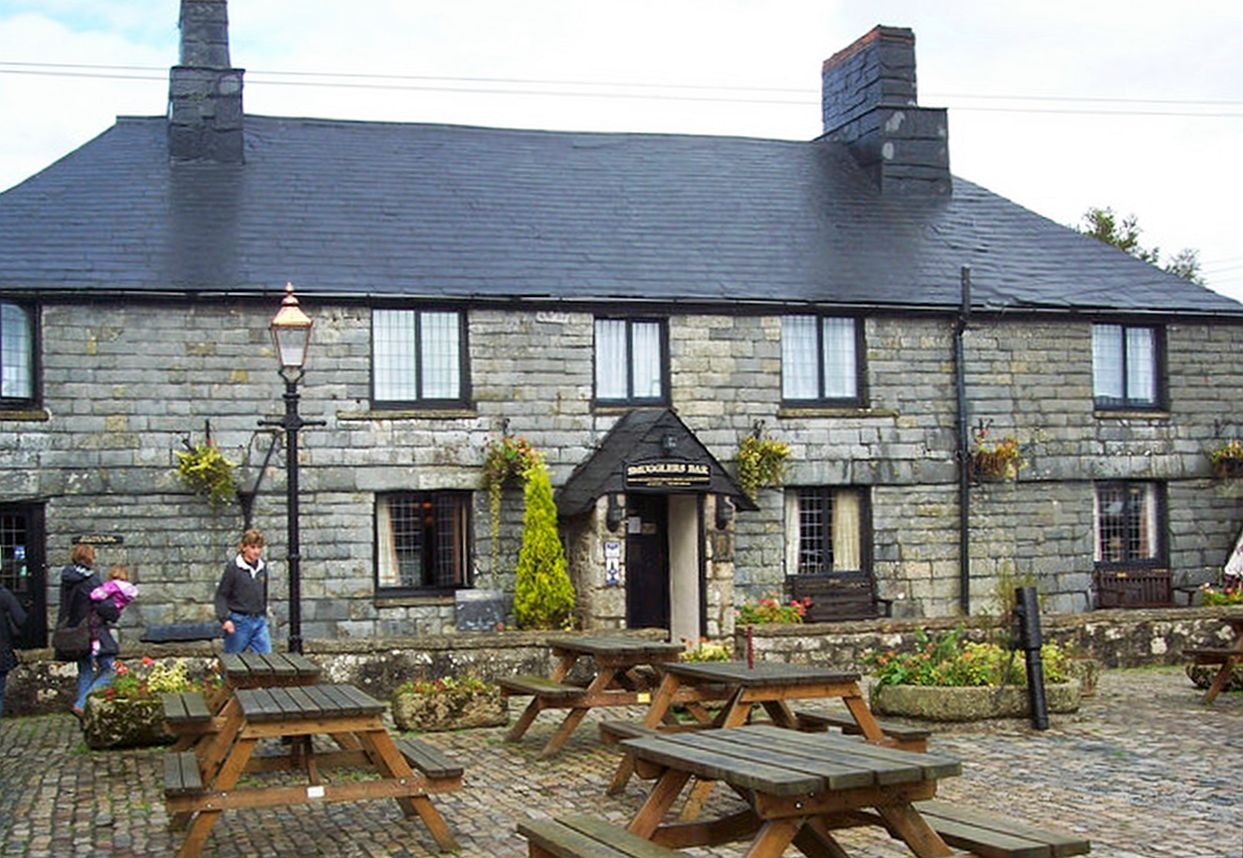
- Jamaica Inn

- Location within Cornwall

General information
- Location: Bolventor, Cornwall, England, UK
- Coordinates: 50°33′44″N 4°34′01″W
- Opening: 1760/1776

Website
- JamaicaInn.co.uk

The Jamaica Inn is a traditional inn on Bodmin Moor in Cornwall, England, which was built as a coaching inn in 1750, and has a historical association with smuggling. Located just off the A30, near the middle of the moor close to the hamlet of Bolventor, it was originally used as a staging post for changing horses. The 1,122-foot-high (342 m) "Tuber" or "Two Barrows" hill, is close by.

The inn was the setting for Daphne du Maurier's 1936 novel Jamaica Inn, about the nocturnal activities of a smuggling ring, "portraying a hidden world as a place of tense excitement and claustrophobia of real peril and thrill." In the novel, it was transformed into a rendezvous and warehouse for smuggling that was solely the home of the landlord and his wife. The novel has been adapted into various media, most famously an eponymous 1939 film directed by Alfred Hitchcock. However, the inn itself has never actually been used as a filming location.

The inn is also referenced in "Jamaica Inn", a song by Tori Amos from her album The Beekeeper (2005), written while she was driving along the cliffs in Cornwall, and inspired by the legend she had heard of the inn.

== Location ==
Jamaica Inn is on Bodmin Moor, near Bolventor. Brown Willy is situated four miles (six kilometres) to the north, while Rough Tor is nearby, as are the valleys of Hantergantick and Hannon. Dozmary Pool is situated 1 1/2 miles (2.5 kilometres) south of the inn, while a branch of the river Fowey is 1/2 mile (800 metres) west. Spread over 3/4 acre (0.3 hectares) of land, the Jamaica Inn has been refurbished and functions as an exclusive bed and breakfast establishment, with a pub, a museum and a gift shop. Bodmin is connected by road with St Austell railway station, which is on the London-Penzance Cornish Main Line. The farm where British astronomer John Couch Adams was born is nearby. Other landmarks include the Four-hole Cross, Peverell's Cross, the circular entrenchment near Cardinham, and the Knights Templar church ruins at Temple. Between the inn and Kilmarth, a house near Par, can be found hut circles, stone lines and parts of ancient stream works.

== History ==
Though an inn has stood on the main road (modern A30, before the bypass was built) through the hamlet since 1547, the current building dates from 1750. It was extended in 1778 with a coach house, stables and a tack room assembled in an L-shaped fashion. It is often commonly thought that the inn takes its name from the smugglers who smuggled rum into the country from Jamaica and stored it at the inn. However, the name of the inn is actually said to derive from the important local Trelawney family of landowners, of which two family members served as Governors of Jamaica in the 18th century.

Cornwall has been very aptly described as the "haven of smugglers" in view of its topographic features of "rocky coves, sheltered bays, tumultuous waves and wild and untenanted landscapes". The inn became a smugglers' stopping point while they used approximately 100 secret routes to move around their contraband.

According to narrated story, gangs of wreckers operated on the coast of Cornwall during early 19th century. The wreckers ensnared ships to this coast line by tricking them with use of lights which they purposefully installed on the shores of the coast. Once the ships foundered on the rocky coast they were looted by the wreckers. While such endeavours have been depicted in many stories and legends, there is no clear evidence that this has ever happened.

By 1847, Francis Rodd of Trebartha Hall, who had been High Sheriff of Cornwall in 1845, was building a chapel at Bolventor to accommodate those who lived in the Jamaica Inn area. A 1856 guide book by Thomas Clifton Paris states that the same Francis Rodd had erected a church, parsonage, and school near the hitherto solitary halfway house to the satisfaction of the area's residents, and that the inn was frequented by sportsmen in the winter and afforded comfortable, though somewhat rude, accommodation.

The current building still includes the extension of a coach house, stables and a tack room added in 1778. The inn was owned for a period by the novelist Alistair MacLean and it has been listed Grade II on the National Heritage List for England since 23 November 1988.

In March 2022, the inn announced that fox hunts, including the East Cornwall Hunt and the Beaufort Hunt, were banned from its premises, with Allen Jackson, the inn's owner, saying, "We have always lost money because some people won’t come here because of the association with hunts. There are no pluses, all we get is minuses. They never spent any money here – they never came in."

In August 2022, the hotel was acquired by The Coaching Inn Group, a national operator of distinctive coaching inns and destination venues.

== Architecture and fittings ==
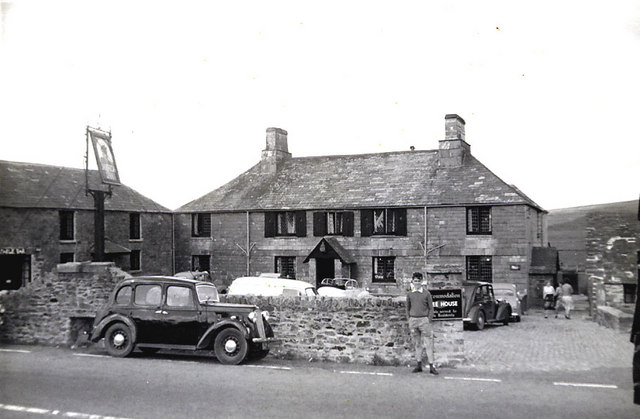
As the inn was in 1959, before the late 20th c. alterations and additions

The two-storey building, constructed in the mid-18th century, had symmetrical front windows that were replaced in the 20th century. The slate roof is bitumen-coated and has hipped ends. An extension with two additional rooms was built in the 19th and 20th centuries. The central door and gabled porch are flanked by two light casements; all are attributed to the 20th century. The building's exterior is made of dark slate and stone. It has a cobbled courtyard which features an old rusty anchor and a red telephone box. Historically, however, the courtyard was gravel. The exterior to the Smuggler's Bar says, "Through these portals passed smugglers, wreckers, villains and murderers, but rest easy... 'twas many years ago".

The interior is characterised by sloping floors with many of its original beams. Internal building partitions have been removed. The fireplaces display roughly cut granite lintels. The Smuggler's Bar in particular retains its 18th-century feel with its large granite fireplace in the bar and dark wood beams. The bar area contains many old bank notes on the walls and various items such as brass or copper kettles and urns.

== Museums ==
=== Mr Potter's Museum of Curiosities ===
Between 1984 and 2003, the building housed a large collection of stuffed animals in complex dioramas, such as an animal courthouse or school classroom populated by baby squirrels. Known as "Mr Potter's Museum of Curiosities", these exhibits were created by Walter Potter in the 1850s, and were originally housed in his museum in Bramber, Sussex. The collection was auctioned by Bonhams in 2003 resulting in its dispersal.

=== Museum of Smuggling ===
The inn now contains "The Museum of Smuggling", which is located to the western side of the inn and the main coaching house. A plaque on the walls outside says "The Museum of Smuggling. Presents a record of classical examples in the arts of concealment and evasion". The museum's main focus is its collection of smuggling artefacts that is depicted through the history of the Jamaica Inn and the inn's role in this trade for many years. The Cornish coast was the most popular location for smuggling of silks, tea, tobacco and brandy into England and operated from locations such as Polperro on the south coast and Boscastle, Trebarwith and Tintagel on the north coast as this coastline was not well covered by the law enforcing authorities. Many of the smugglers stored their contraband in the isolated location of the Jamaica Inn. It is also said that even the judges were fairly lenient towards the smugglers, probably due to their receiving some of the smuggled goods. The museum contains various items including "Wanted" posters, one of which is dated to 1798, a poster celebrating Lord Nelson's victory at the Battle of Trafalgar, various pottery figures of smugglers and villains, a bag of "10 pounds of Jamaican ganja" and old books etc. There is also a display of various items owned by Daphne du Maurier, including her writing desk and typewriter, in the room where she stayed in 1930.

== Gallery ==
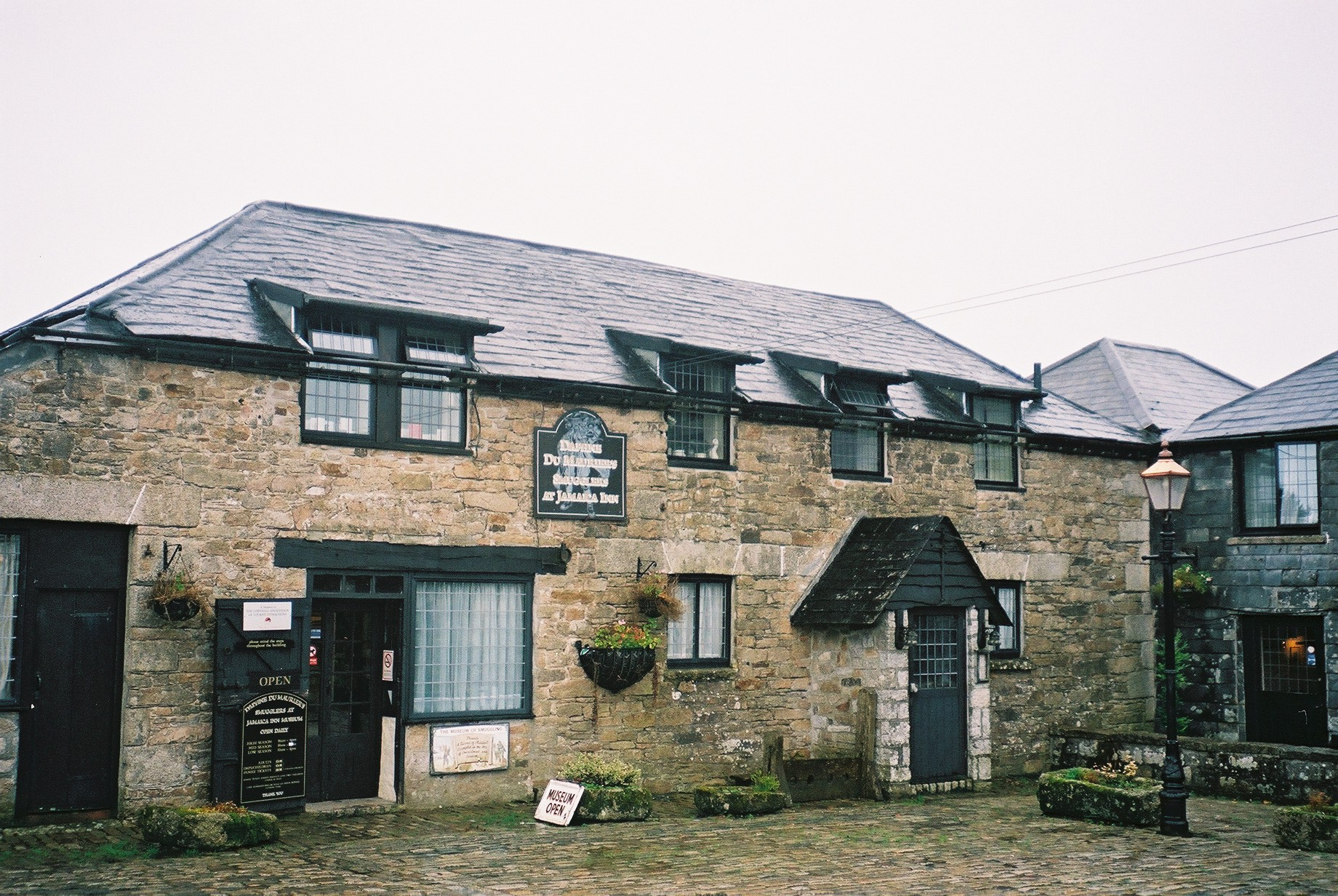
Museum exterior

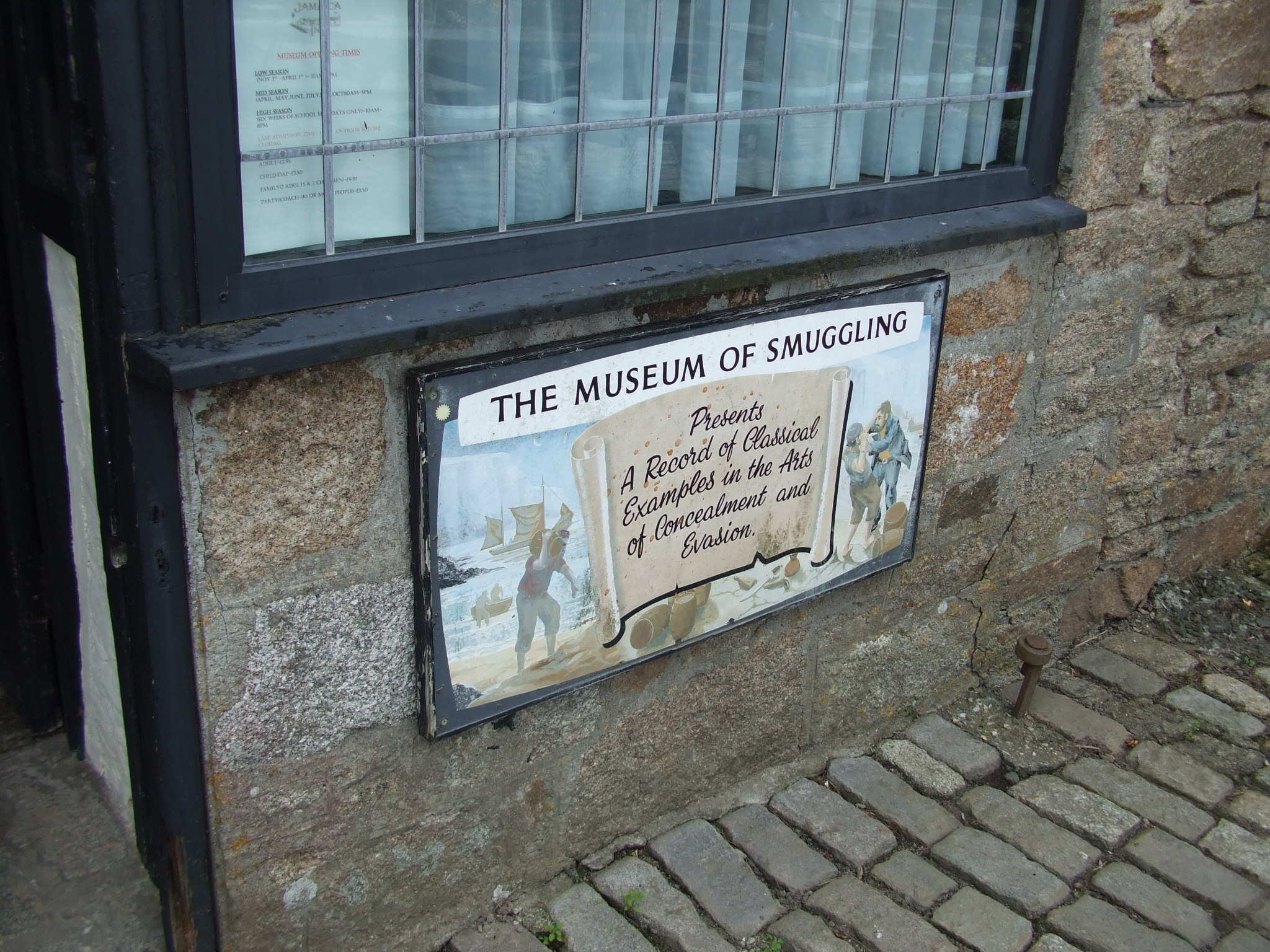
Exterior plaque

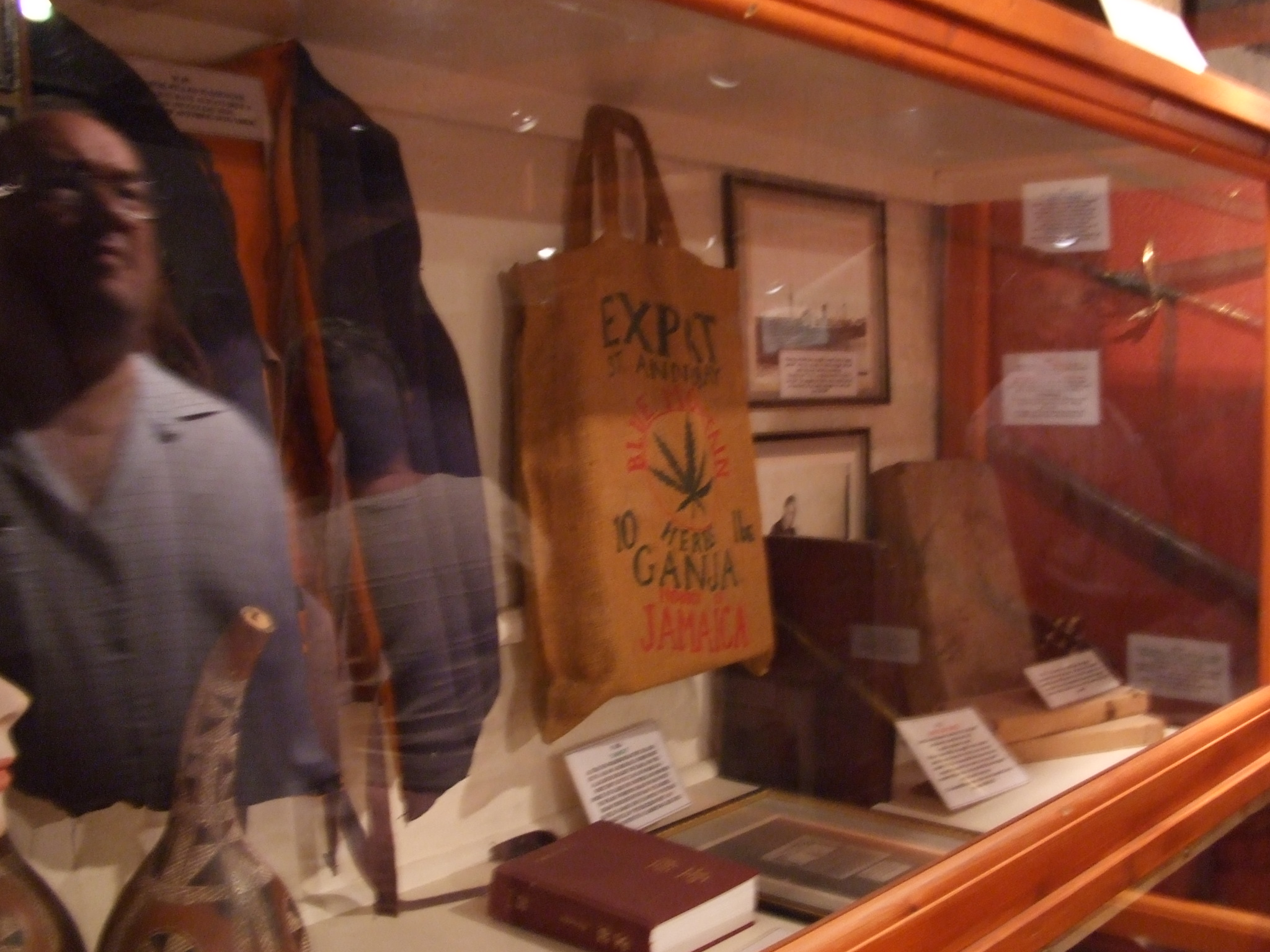
Bag of "10 pounds of Jamaican ganja"

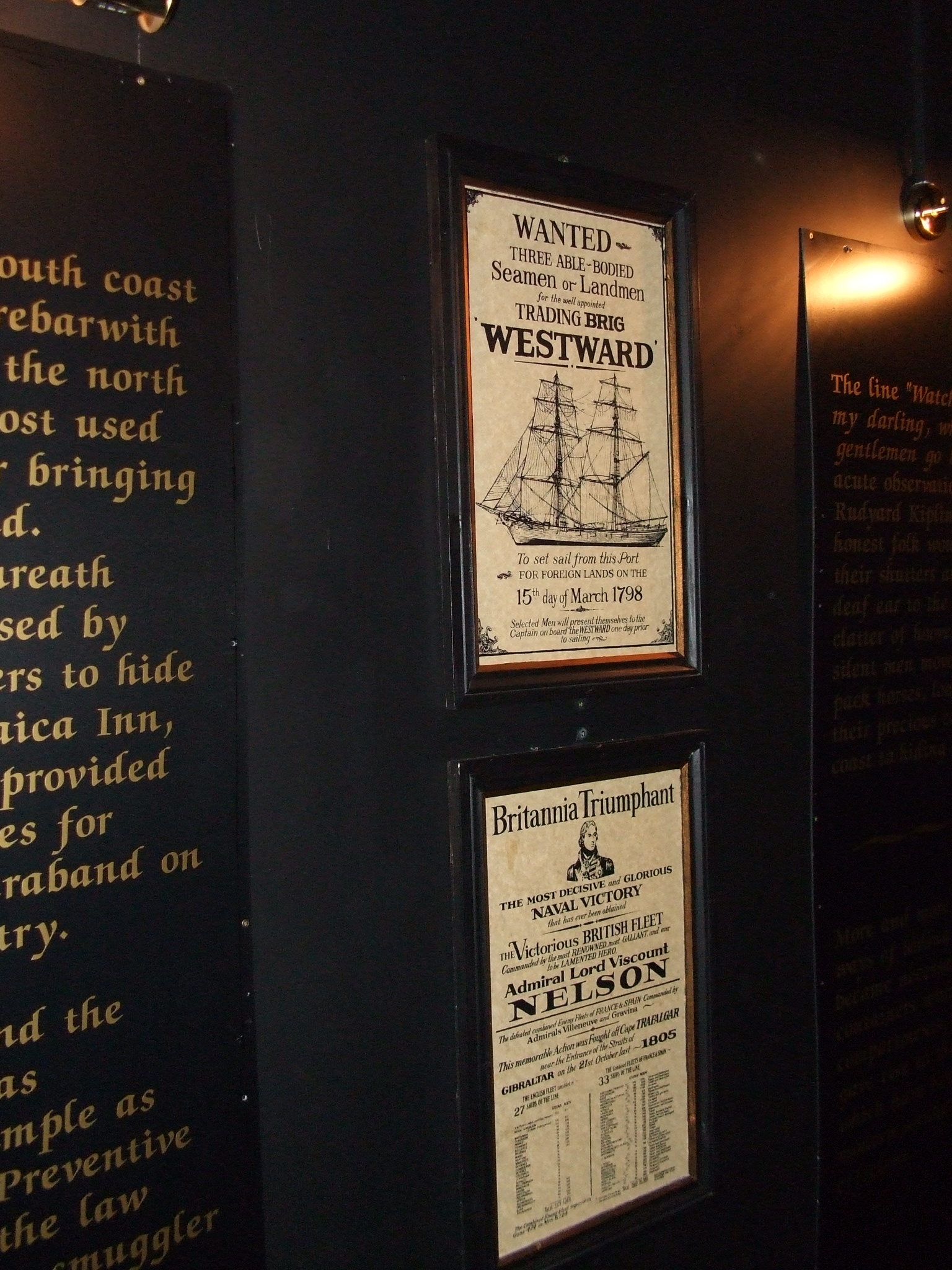
Historical posters

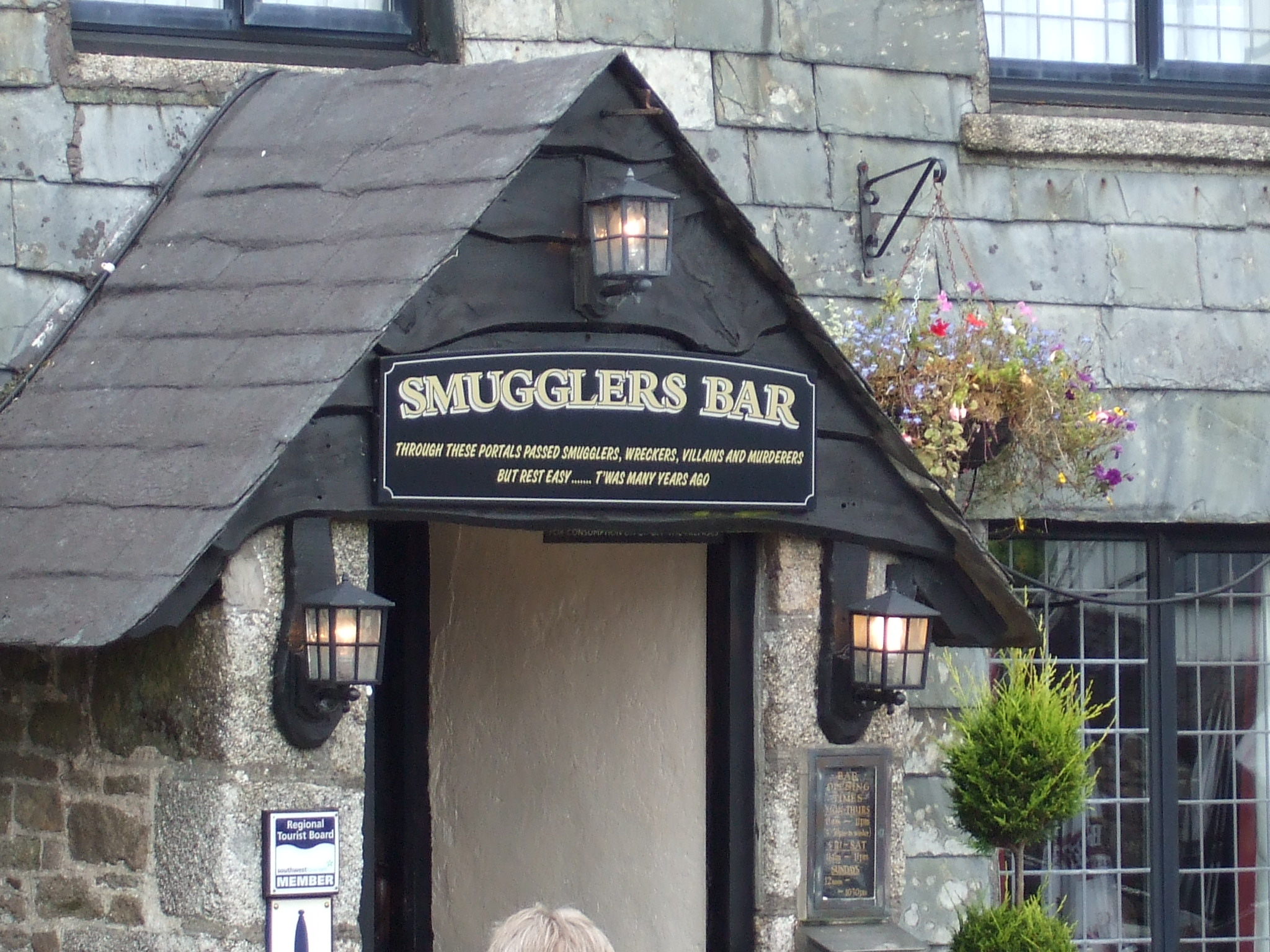
Smuggler's Bar exterior

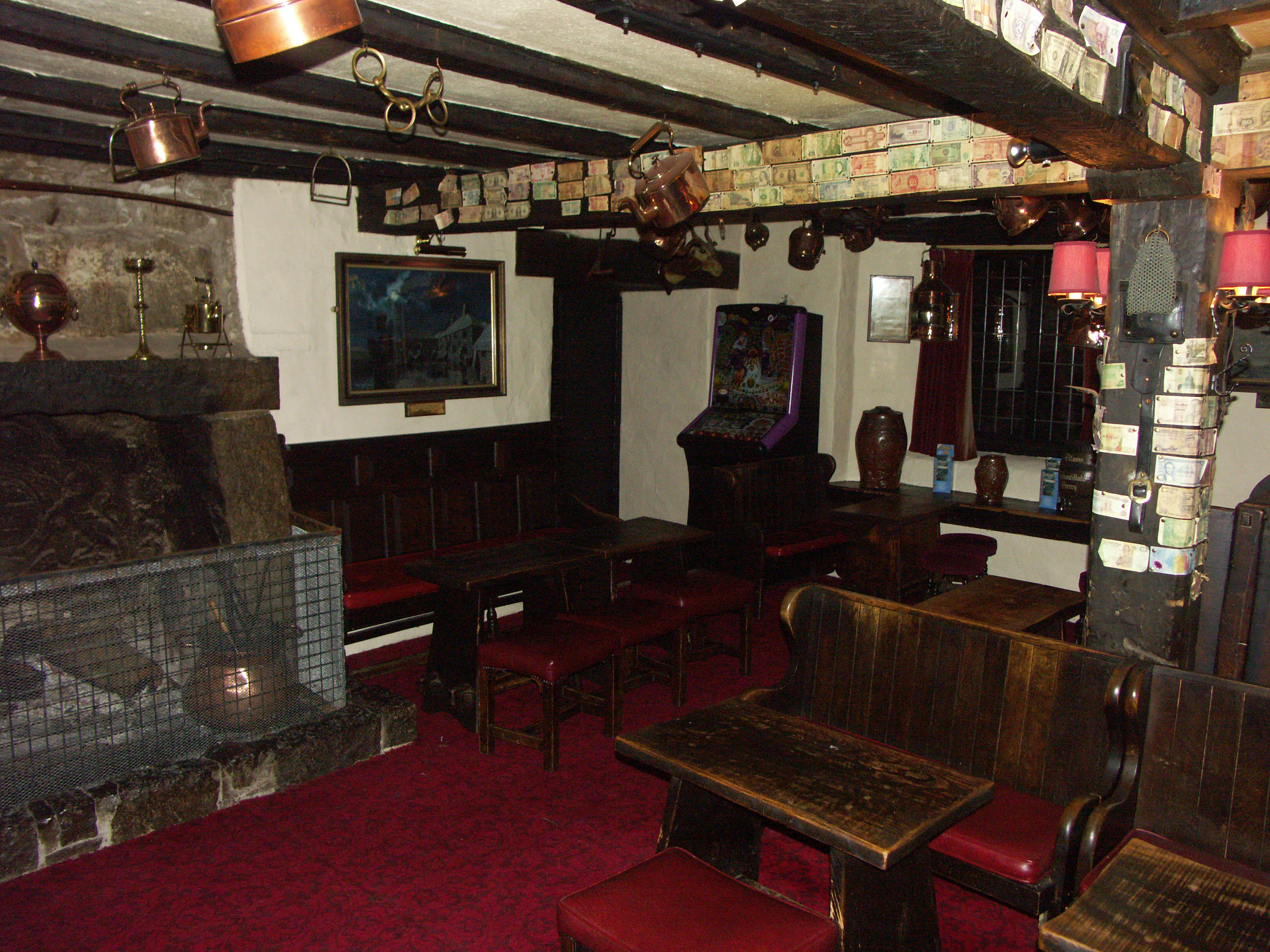
Interior

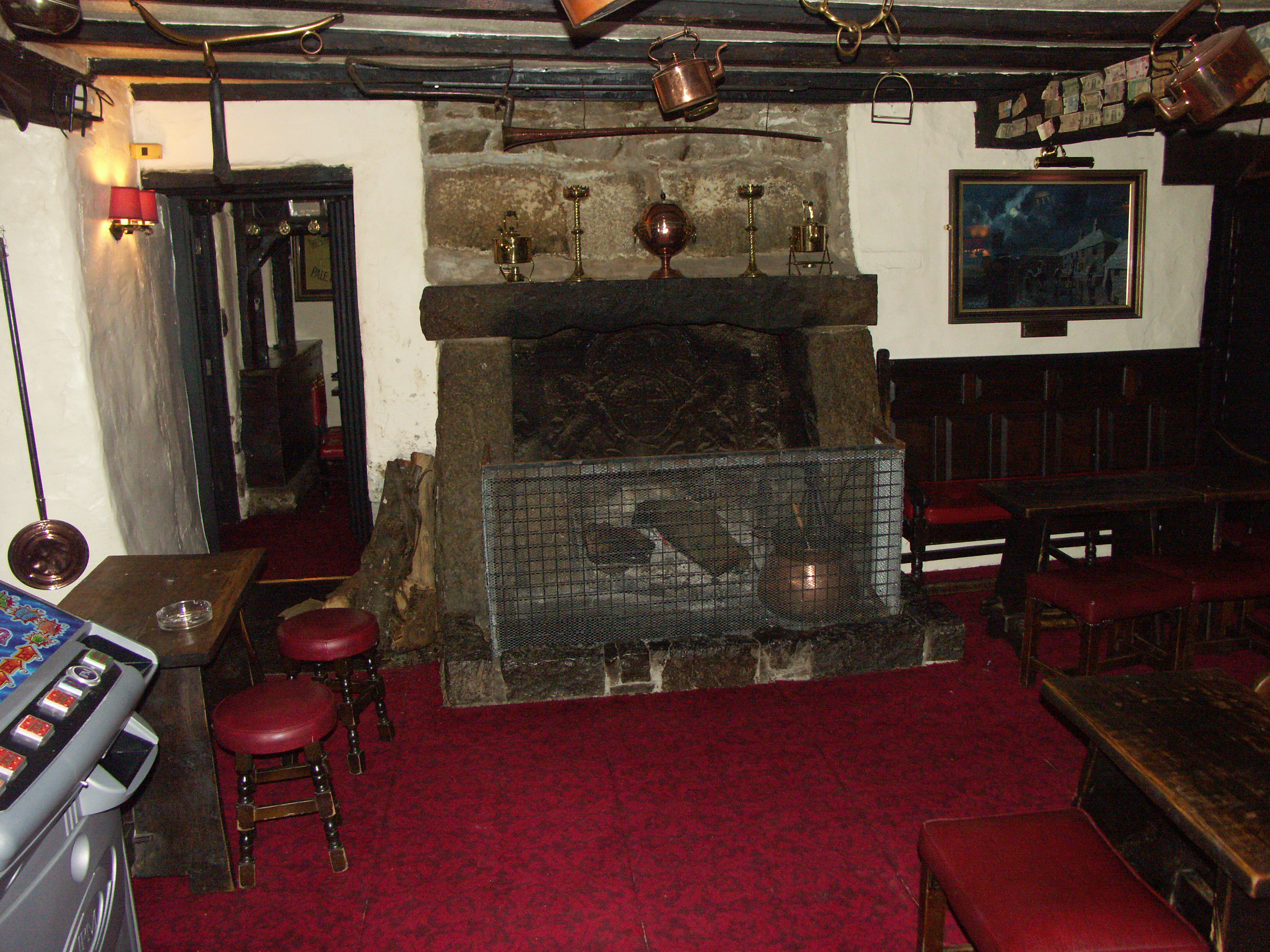
Granite fireplace

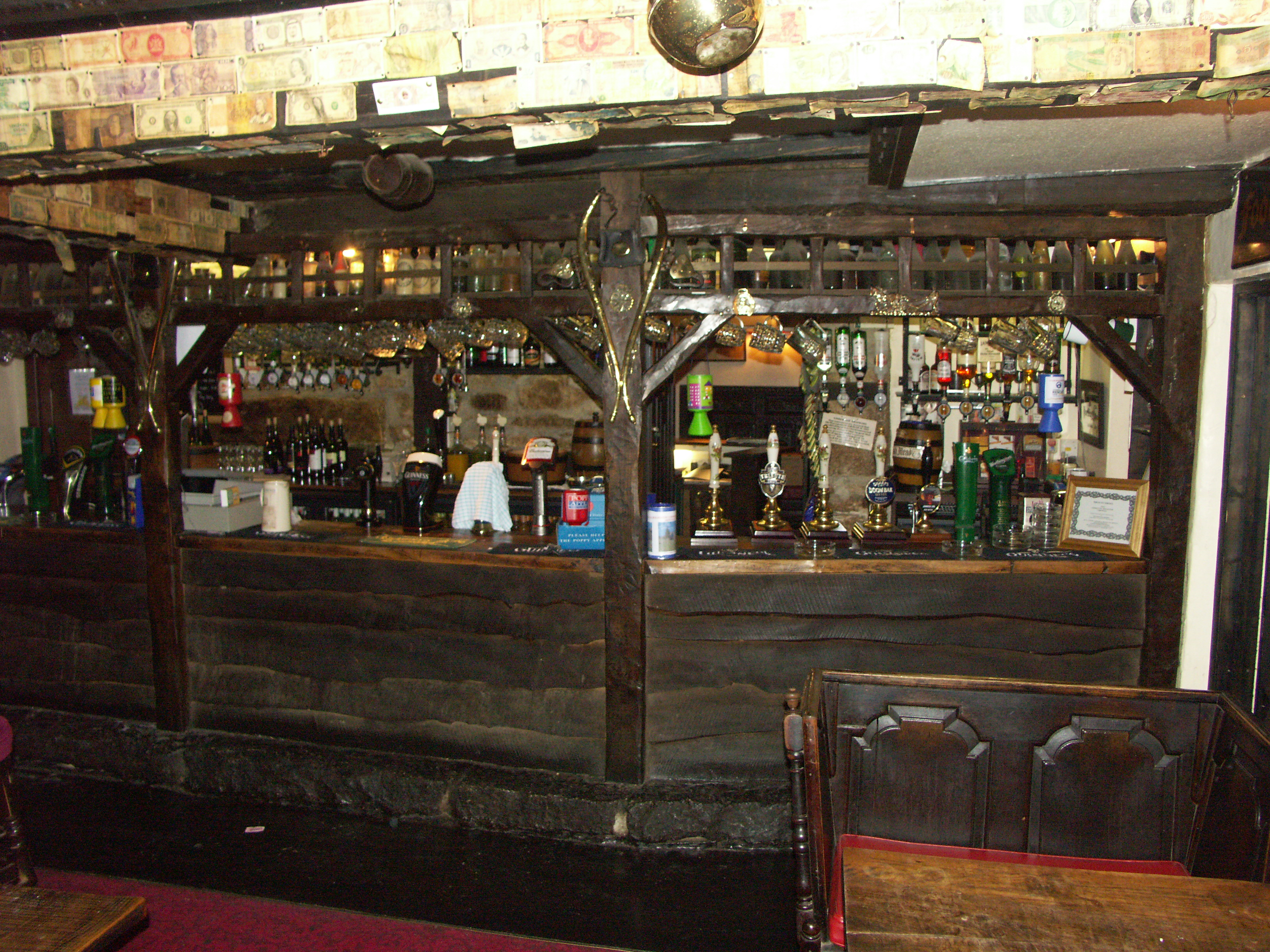
Bar area, with currency on the walls
