= Jamaica Inn (novel) =

1936 novel by Daphne du Maurier

- The first UK edition
- Author: Daphne du Maurier
- Genre: Murder mystery, Gothic novel
- Published: January 1936 Gollancz (UK); Doubleday Doran (US)

Jamaica Inn is a novel by the English writer Daphne du Maurier, first published in 1936. Set in Cornwall around 1815, it was inspired by du Maurier's 1930 stay at the actual Jamaica Inn, which still exists as a pub on Bodmin Moor.

The plot follows Mary Yellan, a young woman who moves to Jamaica Inn to stay with her Aunt Patience and Uncle Joss after the death of her mother. She quickly discovers that the inn is an unsavoury place, mistrusted by the locals, and that her uncle is closely linked with a group of suspicious men who appear to be wreckers.

== Plot ==
After her parents' death, the 23 year-old Mary Yellan is forced to sell the family farm. As a promise to her mother, Mary goes to live with her only surviving relative – her mother's sister, Patience Merlyn – who lives with her husband, Joss in a coaching inn called Jamaica Inn. On arriving at the gloomy inn, Mary finds her once pretty and merry aunt in a ghost-like state under the thumb of the vicious and bullying Joss. Mary soon realizes that something unusual is afoot at the inn, which takes in no guests and is open to the public only to serve food and alcohol. She tries to squeeze the truth out of her uncle during one of his benders, but he tells her, "I'm not drunk enough to tell you why I live in this God-forgotten spot, and why I'm the landlord of Jamaica Inn". She soon learns, however, he is the leader of a band of wreckers, at the centre of whose operations is the Jamaica Inn, used as storage house for smuggled wares.

Not long after her arrival at Jamaica Inn, Mary meets Joss's younger brother, Jem, an unsavory character who shares something of his brother's looks and penchant for small crimes, but nevertheless somewhat fascinates Mary. On Christmas Eve, the two hire a jingle (Note: "Jingle" was a west-of-England term for a form of two-wheeled, horse-drawn tub cart or dray in common use in the nineteenth century.) to travel to the town of Launceston. While there, Jem offers Mary a pair of gold earrings and a red shawl. She is reluctant to accept the gifts and, although they share a kiss, she refuses Jem's offer to spend the night together, but in spite of herself finds herself charmed by him. When it comes time to return to Jamaica Inn, Jem leaves Mary to get the jingle, but never returns.

Mary has no way to get home except by walking, but soon realizes that the weather and distance make it impossible. At this point, the Rev. Francis Davey passes her on the road in a hired coach and offers her a lift home. He departs the coach at a crossroads to walk the rest of the way to Altarnun. The coach is then waylaid by Joss's band of wreckers, and the coach driver is killed. Almost raped by one of Joss's men while trying to escape, Mary resists but is caught and forced to go along with the wreckers and watch as they trick a ship into steering itself on to the rocks, after which they murder the survivors of the shipwreck.

A few days later, Jem goes to the inn to speak with Mary, who has been locked in her room by Joss. With Jem's help, Mary escapes. She goes to Squire Bassat's home to tell him about Joss's misdeeds, but Mrs. Bassat tells Mary that her husband already has the evidence to arrest Joss and has gone to do so. Mrs. Bassat's driver takes Mary to Jamaica Inn, where they arrive before the Squire's party. Mary goes inside and finds Joss stabbed to death; the squire and his men arrive soon thereafter and discover Patience similarly murdered.

The Rev. Davey arrives at the inn and tells Mary that Jem was the one who informed on Joss. The vicar also reveals that he is the true head of the wrecker gang and directly responsible for the murders of Joss and Patience. He then flees, taking Mary as his hostage. They flee across the moor on horses to try to reach a ship to sail to Spain. Meanwhile Squire Bassat and Jem lead a search party to rescue Mary. Eventually Jem gets close enough to shoot the vicar.

Mary has an offer to work as a servant for the Bassats and their two children, but instead plans to return to Helford, her childhood home. As she walks in the moors, making plans to return to Helford, she comes across Jem, leading a cart with all of his possessions, headed in the opposite direction. After some discussion with Jem, Mary decides to abandon her plans to return to Helford and agrees to leave Cornwall with him.

== Adaptations ==
=== Film ===
- A film adaptation of the novel was produced in 1939, directed by Alfred Hitchcock, and starring Charles Laughton and Maureen O'Hara. The film differs from the book in some respects, with Francis Davey being replaced by Sir Humphrey Pengallan (Laughton). Du Maurier was not enamoured of the film.

=== Television ===
- Jamaica Inn (1983), an ITV miniseries starring Jane Seymour, Trevor Eve, Billie Whitelaw, Patrick McGoohan and was nearer the original story than the Hitchcock film.
- L'auberge de la Jamaïque (1995), a French TV movie starring Gilles Béhat and his daughter Alice Béat.
- Jamaica Inn (2014), a BBC miniseries starring Jessica Brown Findlay, Matthew McNulty, Sean Harris, Joanne Whalley and Ben Daniels.

=== Radio ===
- 9 April 1946 with Louise Allbritton, part of the Theatre of Romance series.

BBC Radio full cast adaptations:

- 1939, adapted by Peter Stucley and produced by Michael Goodwin.
- 1947, in five episodes, adapted by Jonquil Antony and produced by Ayton Whitaker.
- 1950, in five episodes, adapted by Jonquil Antony and produced by Norman Wright.
- 1966, in five episodes, adapted by Jonquil Antony and produced by Norman Wright.
- 1975, in four episodes, adapted by Brian Gear and produced by Brian Miller.
- 1983, adapted by Barry Campbell and directed by Derek Hoddinott. [unconfirmed]
- 1984, in four episodes, adapted by Brian Gear and directed by Brian Miller.
- 1991, in four episodes, adapted by Michael Bakewell and directed by Enyd Williams.
- 2003, in four episodes, adapted by Michael Bakewell.
- 2015, in 10 episodes, adapted by Sue Allen and produced by Rob Carter.

BBC Radio serialised solo readings:

- 1946, in 20 episodes, read by Howard Marion-Crawford.
- 1977, in 12 episodes, abridged and read by Delia Paton.
- 1996, in 10 episodes, read by Jenny Agutter and produced by Jane Marshal.

Audiobooks:

- 1983, Music for Pleasure abridged recording by Trevor Eve, the same year he starred in the ITV TV adaptation. Only issued on cassette.
- 1992, Chivers Audio Books unabridged recording by Tony Britton. Originally issued on cassette, then in 2007 on MP3 by Audible
- 1993, Random House Audiobooks abridged recording by Josie Lawrence, only issued on cassette.
- 2004, Hodder Headline Audiobooks abridged recording by Samantha Bond, issued on cassette and CD.

=== Stage ===
- The first known stage adaptation of Jamaica Inn was scripted by Trevor Hedden and performed on tour by the Orchard Theatre Company in 1985. A second adaptation, by David Horlock, was first performed at Salisbury Playhouse in 1990.
- An adaptation by John King was performed at the Regent Centre in 1993 and was to be performed again in February 2009.
- A 2004 adaptation by Lisa Evans was also performed in 2007 and 2017.

== See also ==
- Kilmar Tor
- Brown Willy
- Rough Tor
- The Lighthouse at the End of the World
