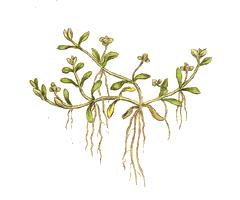
- Elatine hexandra

Scientific classification
- Kingdom: Plantae
- Clade: Tracheophytes
- Clade: Angiosperms
- Clade: Eudicots
- Clade: Rosids
- Order: Malpighiales
- Family: Elatinaceae; Dumort.

Genera
- Bergia; Elatine

= Elatinaceae =

Family of flowering plants

Elatinaceae is a family of flowering plants with ca 35 (to perhaps 50) species in two genera: Elatine and Bergia. The Elatine are mostly aquatic herbs, and the Bergia are subshrubs to shrubs. Elatine species are widely distributed throughout the world from temperate to tropical zones, with its greatest diversity found in temperate zones. Bergia is found in temperate to tropical Eurasia and Africa, with two tropical and one tropical to temperate species in the Americas. The center for biodiversity of Bergia is the Old World tropics, and this is also the center for biodiversity for the family. Neither genus is found in arctic ecosystems.

Members of the family have bisexual flowers, usually small flowers, single, or in cymes, with two to five overlapping petals. The plants have opposite or whorled leaves, which may have glands along their margins, and have stipules. The aquatic herbs in the genus Elatine often have reduced characteristics as part of their adaptation to an aquatic habitat.

Waterwort (Elatine hexandra), a member of this family, and 2 similar species (Elatine hydropiper and Elatine macropoda) are often grown in aquariums.
