= List of awards and nominations received by Emmerdale =

Emmerdale is a British soap opera first broadcast on 16 October 1972. The soap has earned various awards and nominations over the years for storylines and the performances from cast and crew members.

== All About Soap Awards ==
The All About Soap Awards were launched in 2002 and were hosted by All About Soap magazine.

Year	Category	Nominee	Result	Ref
2010	Baby Drama	Nicola's baby snatched	Nominated	
2010	Fatal Attraction	Maisie/Ryan	Nominated	
2010	Femme Fatale	Emma Atkins (Charity Tate)	Nominated	
2010	I'm A Survivor	Charlotte Bellamy (Laurel Thomas)	Nominated	
2010	Killer Secret	Natasha kills Mark	Nominated	
2010	Smooth Criminal	Nathan Wylde	Nominated	
2011	Best Actor	Danny Miller (Aaron Livesy)	Won	
2011	Best Actress	Lucy Pargeter (Chas Dingle)	Nominated	
2011	Best Baby Drama	Rhona/Paddy/Marlon pregnancy shock	Nominated	
2011	Best Love Triangle	Chas/Carl/Eve	Nominated	
2011	Best Newcomer	Marc Silcock (Jackson Walsh)	Won	
2011	Best Stunt	Train crash	Nominated	
2012	Best Actor	Danny Miller (Aaron Livesy)	Nominated	
2012	Best Actress	Chelsea Halfpenny (Amy Wyatt)	Nominated	
2012	Best Episode	Cain's attack	Nominated	
2012	Best Mystery	Who Attacked Cain?	Won	
2012	Best Villain	Jeff Hordley (Cain Dingle)	Nominated	
2013	Best Baby Drama	Jai and Rachel's baby secret	Nominated	
2013	Best Death	Kurtis Stacey (Alex Moss)	Nominated	
2013	Best Death	Tom Lister (Carl King)	Won	
2013	Best Episode	"Emmerdale Live"	Won	
2013	Best Reveal	Chas' stalker uncovered	Nominated	
2013	Best Storyline	Cameron turns killer	Nominated	
2013	Best Stunt	Katie down the mine	Nominated	
2013	Forbidden Lovers	Cain and Moira	Nominated	
2014	Best Soap Moment	Robert kisses Aaron	Won	
2014	Best Soap Moment	Donna's death	Nominated	

== British Academy Television Awards ==
The British Academy Television Awards were launched in 1954 and are presented during an annual award show hosted by the British Academy of Film and Television Arts.

Year	Category	Nominee	Result	Ref
2000	Best Soap Opera	Emmerdale	Nominated	
2001	Best Soap Opera	Emmerdale	Won	
2007	Best Continuing Drama	Emmerdale	Nominated	
2008	Best Continuing Drama	Emmerdale	Nominated	
2009	Best Continuing Drama	Emmerdale	Nominated	
2013	Best Soap and Continuing Drama	Emmerdale	Nominated	
2016	Best Soap and Continuing Drama	Emmerdale	Nominated	
2017	Best Soap and Continuing Drama	Emmerdale	Won	
2018	Best Soap and Continuing Drama	Emmerdale	Nominated	
2020	Best Soap and Continuing Drama	Emmerdale	Won	
2022	Best Soap and Continuing Drama	Emmerdale	Nominated	
2023	Best Soap and Continuing Drama	Emmerdale	Nominated	
2024	Best Soap	Emmerdale	Nominated	

== The British Soap Awards ==
The British Soap Awards is an annual awards ceremony to honour the best of British soap operas. The first ceremony took place in 1999.

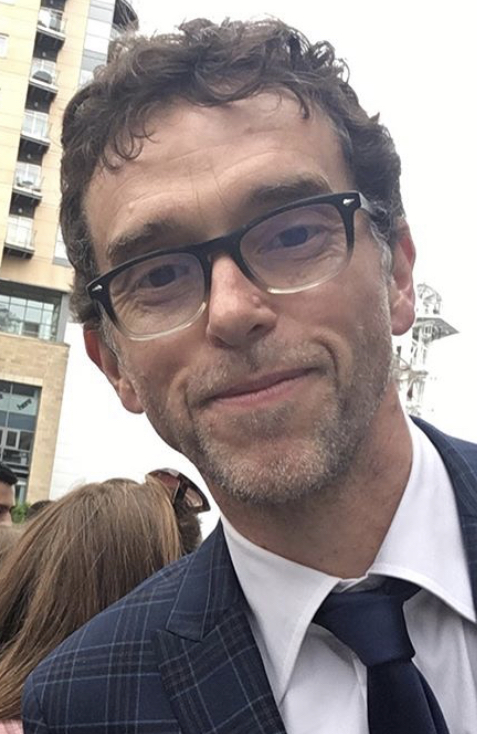
Mark Charnock (Marlon Dingle) was awarded Best Dramatic Performance in 2004 and 2022.

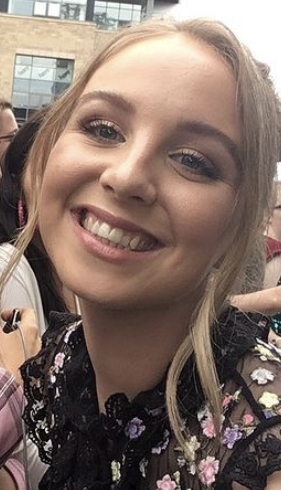
Eden Taylor-Draper (Belle Dingle) was awarded Best Young Performance in 2007 and 2013.

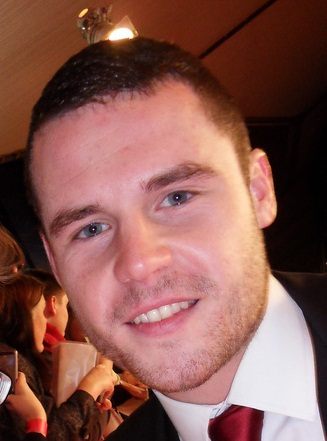
Danny Miller (Aaron Livesy) was awarded Best Actor in 2011, 2012 and 2016.

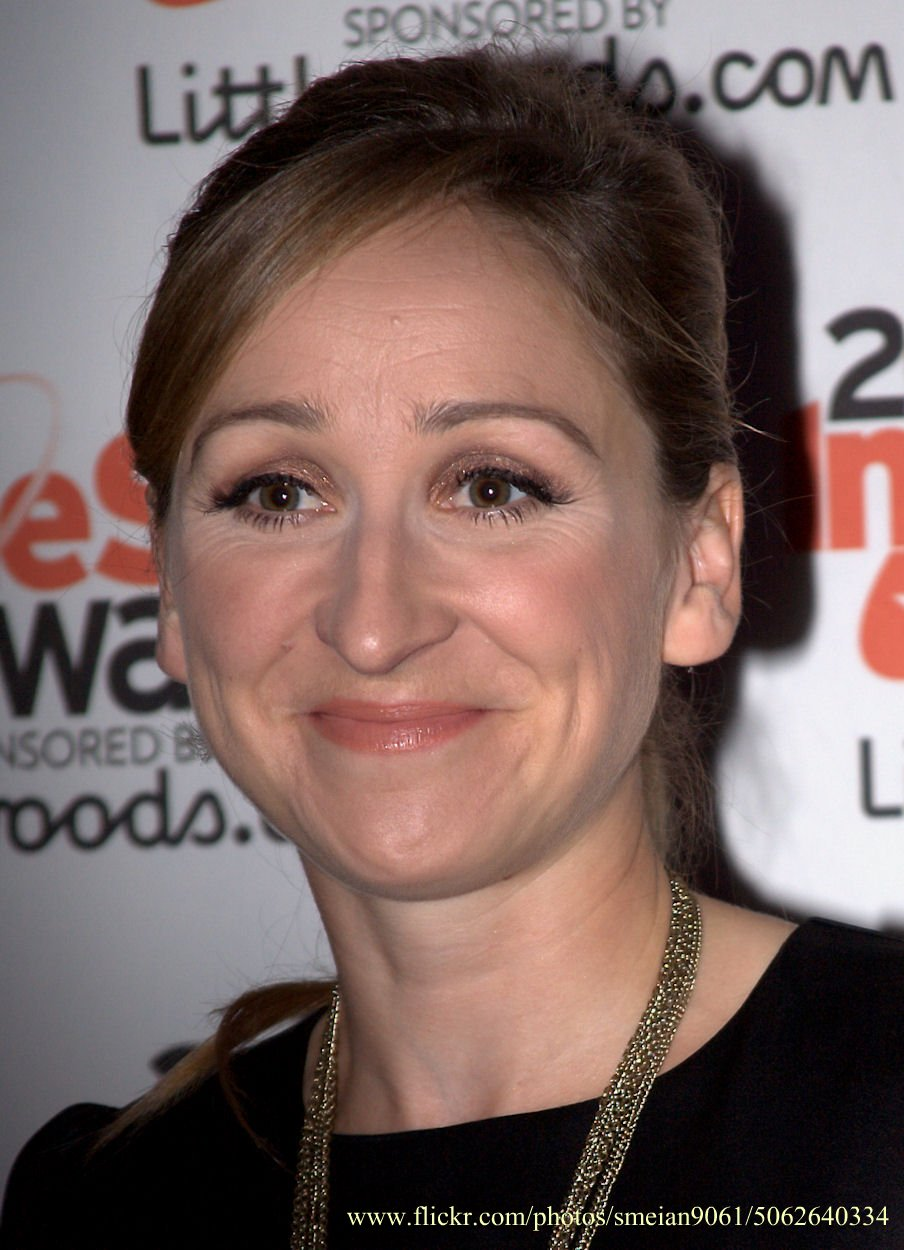
Charlotte Bellamy (Laurel Thomas) was awarded Best Actress in 2017.

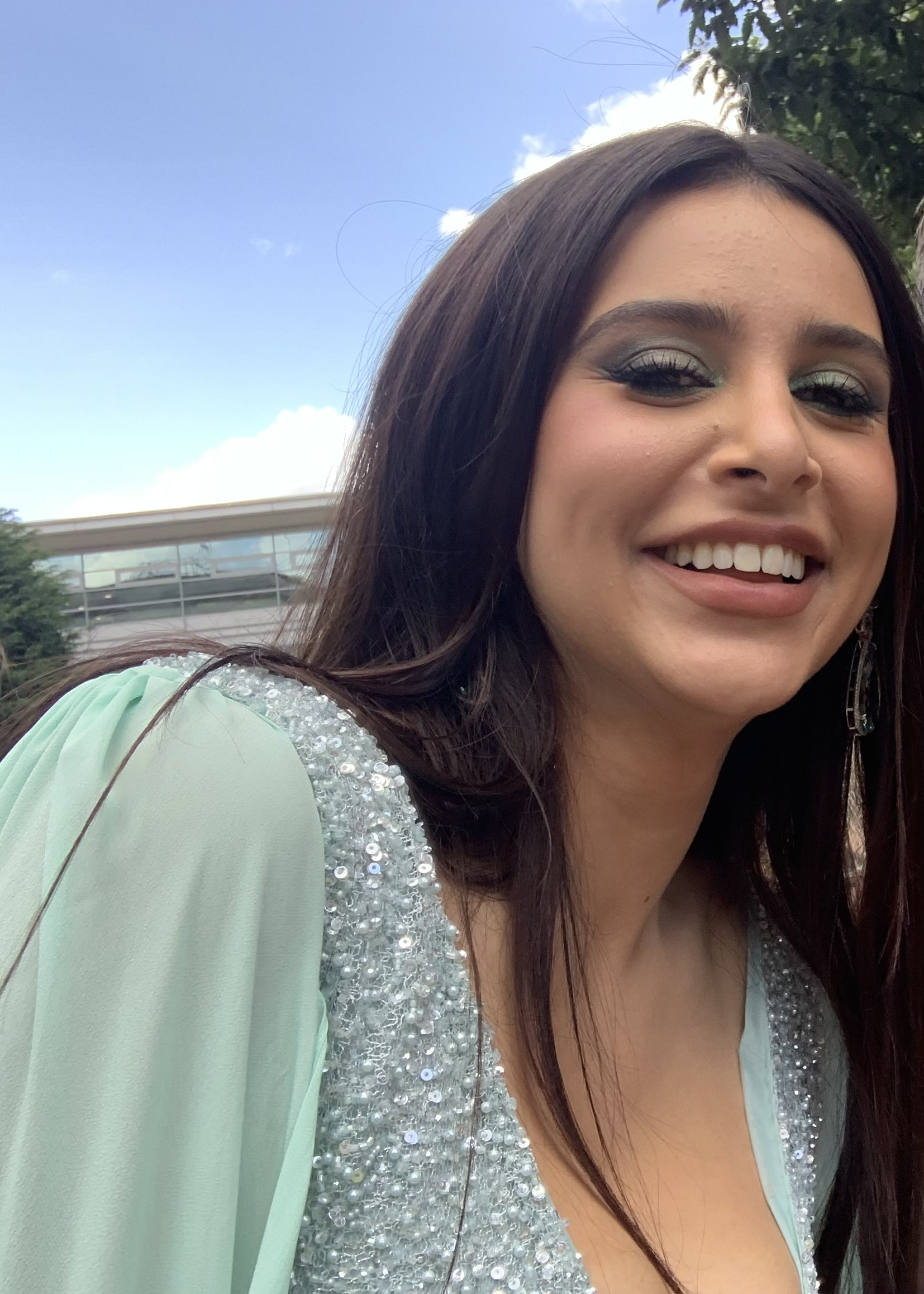
Paige Sandhu (Meena Jutla) was awarded Best Leading Performer in 2022.

Year	Category	Nominee	Result	Ref
1999	Best Actor	Kelvin Fletcher	Nominated	
1999	Best Actress	Lisa Riley	Nominated	
1999	Best British Soap	Emmerdale	Nominated	
1999	Best Dramatic Performance	Kelvin Fletcher	Won	
1999	Best Exit	Claire King	Won	
1999	Best On-Screen Partnership	Lisa Riley and Dominic Brunt	Nominated	
1999	Sexiest Female	Claire King	Nominated	
1999	Sexiest Male	Stuart Wade	Nominated	
1999	Villain of the Year	Claire King	Nominated	
2000	Best Actress	Samantha Giles	Nominated	
2000	Best British Soap	Emmerdale	Nominated	
2000	Best Exit	Paul Loughran	Won	
2001	Best Actor	Clive Hornby	Nominated	
2001	Best British Soap	Emmerdale	Nominated	
2001	Best Dramatic Performance	Clive Hornby	Nominated	
2001	Hero of the Year	Clive Hornby	Won	
2001	Spectacular Scene of the Year	Andy Sugden burning the barn	Won	
2002	Best British Soap	Emmerdale	Nominated	
2002	Best Actor	Steve Halliwell	Nominated	
2002	Best Actor	Tony Audenshaw	Longlisted	
2002	Best Actor	John Middleton	Longlisted	
2002	Best Actress	Samantha Giles	Nominated	
2002	Best Actress	Elizabeth Estensen	Longlisted	
2002	Best Actress	Kate McGregor	Longlisted	
2002	Best Exit	Batley the Dog	Won	
2002	Best On-Screen Partnership	Samantha Giles and John Middleton	Nominated	
2002	Best Storyline	Zak's fight with testicular cancer	Nominated	
2002	Hero of the Year	Steve Halliwell	Nominated	
2002	Villain of the Year	Nicola Wheeler	Longlisted	
2002	Villain of the Year	Jeff Hordley	Longlisted	
2002	Villain of the Year	Chris Chittell	Longlisted	
2002	Sexiest Male	Ben Freeman	Nominated	
2003	Best British Soap	Emmerdale	Nominated	
2003	Best Actor	Mark Charnock	Nominated	
2003	Best Actor	Tony Audenshaw	Longlisted	
2003	Best Actor	Jeff Hordley	Longlisted	
2003	Best Actress	Leah Bracknell	Nominated	
2003	Best Actress	Sheree Murphy	Longlisted	
2003	Best Actress	Deena Payne	Longlisted	
2003	Best Comedy Performance	Mark Charnock	Nominated	
2003	Best Dramatic Performance	Leah Bracknell	Nominated	
2003	Best Exit	Freya Copeland	Nominated	
2003	Best On-Screen Partnership	Sheree Murphy and Mark Charnock	Nominated	
2003	Best Single Episode	Marlon's and Tricia's failed wedding day plans	Won	
2003	Best Storyline	Zoe suffers from schizophrenia	Nominated	
2003	Villain of the Year	Seamus Gubbins	Longlisted	
2003	Villain of the Year	Jeff Hordley	Longlisted	
2004	Best British Soap	Emmerdale	Nominated	
2004	Best Actor	Mark Charnock	Nominated	
2004	Best Actor	Billy Hartman	Longlisted	
2004	Best Actor	John Middleton	Longlisted	
2004	Best Actress	Leah Bracknell	Longlisted	
2004	Best Actress	Emma Atkins	Longlisted	
2004	Best Actress	Sheree Murphy	Longlisted	
2004	Best Dramatic Performance	Mark Charnock	Won	
2004	Best Dramatic Performance from a Young Actor or Actress	Luke Tittensor	Nominated	
2004	Best Exit	Sheree Murphy	Won	
2004	Best Newcomer	Luke Tittensor	Nominated	
2004	Best Single Episode	The Storm	Nominated	
2004	Sexiest Female	Sammy Winward	Nominated	
2004	Spectacular Scene of the Year	The Storm	Won	
2004	Villain of the Year	Peter Amory	Nominated	
2004	Villain of the Year	Jeff Hordley	Longlisted	
2004	Villain of the Year	Karl Davies	Longlisted	
2005	Best British Soap	Emmerdale	Nominated	
2005	Best Actor	Mark Charnock	Longlisted	
2005	Best Actor	Ken Farrington	Longlisted	
2005	Best Actor	Jeff Hordley	Longlisted	
2005	Best Actress	Emma Atkins	Nominated	
2005	Best Actress	Jane Cox	Longlisted	
2005	Best Actress	Elizabeth Estensen	Longlisted	
2005	Best Comedy Performance	Deena Payne	Nominated	
2005	Best Exit	Emma Atkins	Nominated	
2005	Best Newcomer	Charlie Hardwick	Nominated	
2005	Best Onscreen Partnership	Charlie Hardwick and Elizabeth Estensen	Nominated	
2005	Best Single Episode	Charity and Tom's Wedding	Won	
2005	Best Storyline	Diane's struggle with cancer	Nominated	
2005	Soap Bitch of the Year	Patsy Kensit	Nominated	
2005	Villain of the Year	Lorraine Chase	Nominated	
2005	Villain of the Year	Jeff Hordley	Longlisted	
2005	Villain of the Year	Patsy Kensit	Longlisted	
2006	Best British Soap	Emmerdale	Nominated	
2006	Best Actor	Mark Charnock	Longlisted	
2006	Best Actor	Ken Farrington	Longlisted	
2006	Best Actor	James Hooton	Longlisted	
2006	Best Actress	Charlotte Bellamy	Longlisted	
2006	Best Actress	Charlie Hardwick	Longlisted	
2006	Best Actress	Paula Tilbrook	Longlisted	
2006	Best Comedy Performance	Charlie Hardwick	Won	
2006	Best Dramatic Performance	Ursula Holden Gill	Nominated	
2006	Best Dramatic Performance from a Young Actor or Actress	Luke Tittensor	Nominated	
2006	Best Exit	Leah Bracknell	Won	
2006	Best Newcomer	Jenna-Louise Coleman	Nominated	
2006	Best Single Episode	Zoe's Exit	Nominated	
2006	Soap Bitch of the Year	Nicola Wheeler	Won	
2006	Soap Bitch of the Year	Patsy Kensit	Nominated	
2006	Villain of the Year	Nick Brimble	Longlisted	
2006	Villain of the Year	Matt Healy	Longlisted	
2006	Villain of the Year	Patsy Kensit	Longlisted	
2006	Spectacular Scene of the Year	Belle and Daz trapped in a mine shaft	Won	
2006	Spectacular Scene of the Year	Home Farm explodes	Nominated	
2006	Special Achievement Award	Tony Prescott	Won	
2007	Best British Soap	Emmerdale	Nominated	
2007	Best Actor	Steve Halliwell	Longlisted	
2007	Best Actor	Ken Farrington	Longlisted	
2007	Best Actor	James Hooton	Longlisted	
2007	Best Actress	Ursula Holden Gill	Nominated	
2007	Best Actress	Shirley Stelfox	Longlisted	
2007	Best Actress	Charley Webb	Longlisted	
2007	Best Comedy Performance	Charlie Hardwick	Nominated	
2007	Best Dramatic Performance From a Young Actor or Actress	Eden Taylor-Draper	Won	
2007	Best Exit	Lorraine Chase	Nominated	
2007	Best Exit	Jeff Hordley	Nominated	
2007	Best Newcomer	Joseph Gilgun	Nominated	
2007	Best Single Episode	Cain and Sadie's Exit	Nominated	
2007	Best Storyline	Who Killed Tom King?	Nominated	
2007	Villain of the Year	Linda Thorson	Longlisted	
2007	Villain of the Year	Ken Farrington	Longlisted	
2007	Villain of the Year	Jeff Hordley	Longlisted	
2007	Spectacular Scene of the Year	The House Collapse	Won	
2007	Spectacular Scene of the Year	The Truck Crash	Nominated	
2008	Best British Soap	Emmerdale	Nominated	
2008	Best Actor	Kelvin Fletcher	Longlisted	
2008	Best Actor	John Middleton	Longlisted	
2008	Best Actor	James Hooton	Longlisted	
2008	Best Actress	Charlotte Bellamy	Nominated	
2008	Best Actress	Roxanne Pallett	Longlisted	
2008	Best Actress	Verity Rushworth	Longlisted	
2008	Best Comedy Performance	Charlie Hardwick	Nominated	
2008	Best Dramatic Performance	Charlotte Bellamy	Nominated	
2008	Best Dramatic Performance From a Young Actor or Actress	Eden Taylor-Draper	Nominated	
2008	Best Exit	Peter Martin	Nominated	
2008	Villain of the Year	Joseph Gilgun	Longlisted	
2008	Villain of the Year	Matt Healy	Longlisted	
2008	Villain of the Year	Nicola Wheeler	Longlisted	
2008	Best Single Episode	Daniel's Death	Won	
2008	Special Achievement Award	Tim Fee	Won	
2009	Best British Soap	Emmerdale	Nominated	
2009	Best Actor	Mark Charnock	Longlisted	
2009	Best Actor	Kelvin Fletcher	Longlisted	
2009	Best Actor	John Middleton	Longlisted	
2009	Best Actress	Jenna-Louise Coleman	Longlisted	
2009	Best Actress	Elizabeth Estensen	Longlisted	
2009	Best Actress	Charley Webb	Longlisted	
2009	Best Comedy Performance	Dominic Brunt	Nominated	
2009	Best Dramatic Performance	Jenna-Louise Coleman	Nominated	
2009	Best Dramatic Performance from a Young Actor or Actress	Isabel Hodgins	Nominated	
2009	Best Exit	Matt Healy	Nominated	
2009	Best Onscreen Partnership	Dominic Brunt and Mark Charnock	Nominated	
2009	Villain of the Year	Matt Healy	Longlisted	
2009	Villain of the Year	Paul McEwan	Longlisted	
2009	Villain of the Year	Nicola Wheeler	Longlisted	
2009	Spectacular Scene of the Year	Victoria falls through the ice	Won	
2010	Best Dramatic Performance	Danny Miller	Nominated	
2010	Best Actor	Danny Miller	Nominated	
2010	Best Actor	John Middleton	Longlisted	
2010	Best Actor	James Sutton	Longlisted	
2010	Sexiest Male	James Sutton	Nominated	
2010	Sexiest Male	James Thornton	Nominated	
2010	Sexiest Male	Jeff Hordley	Nominated	
2010	Villain of the Year	Jeff Hordley	Longlisted	
2010	Villain of the Year	Sian Reeves	Nominated	
2010	Villain of the Year	Lyndon Ogbourne	Longlisted	
2010	Best Actress	Amanda Donohoe	Longlisted	
2010	Best Actress	Emma Atkins	Longlisted	
2010	Best Actress	Charlotte Bellamy	Nominated	
2010	Best Dramatic Performance from a Young Actor or Actress	Oscar Lloyd	Nominated	
2010	Best Comedy Performance	Dominic Brunt	Nominated	
2010	Best Exit	Maxwell Caulfield	Nominated	
2010	Best Newcomer	Lyndon Ogbourne	Nominated	
2010	Best Onscreen Partnership	Nick Miles and Nicola Wheeler	Nominated	
2010	Best Single Episode	Aaron Confesses His Sexuality	Nominated	
2010	Best Soap	Emmerdale	Nominated	
2010	Best Storyline	Aaron's Gay Self-Loathing	Nominated	
2010	Sexiest Female	Alice Coulthard	Nominated	
2010	Sexiest Female	Sammy Windward	Nominated	
2010	Sexiest Female	Charley Webb	Nominated	
2010	Special Achievement Award	Bill Lyons	Won	
2010	Spectacular Scene of the Year	Home Farm Shop Crash	Nominated	
2011	Best British Soap	Emmerdale	Nominated	
2011	Best Actor	Danny Miller	Won	
2011	Best Actor	Dominic Brunt	Longlisted	
2011	Best Actor	Mark Charnock	Longlisted	
2011	Best Actress	Jane Cox	Nominated	
2011	Best Actress	Emma Atkins	Longlisted	
2011	Best Actress	Pauline Quirke	Longlisted	
2011	Best Comedy Performance	Charlie Hardwick	Nominated	
2011	Best Dramatic Performance	Danny Miller	Nominated	
2011	Best Exit	Andy Devine	Nominated	
2011	Best Newcomer	Pauline Quirke	Nominated	
2011	Best Onscreen Partnership	Emma Atkins and Jeff Hordley	Nominated	
2011	Villain of the Year	Jeff Hordley	Longlisted	
2011	Villain of the Year	Michael McKell	Longlisted	
2011	Villain of the Year	Lyndon Ogbourne	Longlisted	
2011	Best Single Episode	The Betrayed	Nominated	
2011	Best Storyline	Holly's Drug Addiction	Nominated	
2011	Best Young Performance	Eden Taylor Draper	Nominated	
2011	Special Achievement Award	Gavin Blyth	Won	
2011	Spectacular Scene of the Year	The Train Crash	Nominated	
2012	Best British Soap	Emmerdale	Nominated	
2012	Best Actor	Danny Miller	Won	
2012	Best Actor	Jeff Hordley	Longlisted	
2012	Best Actor	John Middleton	Longlisted	
2012	Best Actress	Chelsea Halfpenny	Longlisted	
2012	Best Actress	Natalie J Robb	Longlisted	
2012	Best Actress	Charley Webb	Longlisted	
2012	Best Dramatic Performance	Jeff Hordley	Nominated	
2012	Best Exit	James Thornton	Nominated	
2012	Best Newcomer	Gemma Oaten	Nominated	
2012	Best On-screen Partnership	Emma Atkins and Jeff Hordley	Nominated	
2012	Best Single Episode	The Longest Day	Nominated	
2012	Best Storyline	Jackson's choice	Won	
2012	Best Young Performance	Eden Taylor Draper	Nominated	
2012	Villain of the Year	Jeff Hordley	Longlisted	
2012	Villain of the Year	Jason Merrells	Longlisted	
2012	Villain of the Year	Tom Lister	Longlisted	
2012	Sexiest Male	Matthew Wolfenden	Nominated	
2012	Spectacular Scene of the Year	John and Moira's car accident	Won	
2013	Best British Soap	Emmerdale	Nominated	
2013	Sexiest Male	Matthew Wolfenden	Nominated	
2013	Sexiest Female	Natalie Anderson	Nominated	
2013	Villain of the Year	Dominic Power	Nominated	
2013	Villain of the Year	Charley Webb	Longlisted	
2013	Villain of the Year	Tom Lister	Longlisted	
2013	Best Actor	Jeff Hordley	Nominated	
2013	Best Actor	Steve Halliwell	Longlisted	
2013	Best Actor	Tom Lister	Longlisted	
2013	Best Actress	Lucy Pargeter	Longlisted	
2013	Best Actress	Sian Reese-Williams	Longlisted	
2013	Best Actress	Charley Webb	Longlisted	
2013	Best Single Episode	Emmerdale Live	Won	
2013	Best Dramatic Performance	Lucy Pargeter	Nominated	
2013	Best Comedy Performance	Dominic Brunt	Nominated	
2013	Best Young Performance	Eden Taylor-Draper	Won	
2013	Spectacular Scene of the Year	Cain's clifftop rescue of Zak	Nominated	
2013	Best On-Screen Partnership	Lucy Pargeter and Dominic Power	Nominated	
2013	Best Newcomer	Laura Norton	Nominated	
2013	Best Storyline	Zak's depression	Nominated	
2013	Best Exit	Tom Lister	Nominated	
2014	Best British Soap	Emmerdale	Nominated	
2014	Sexiest Male	Matthew Wolfenden	Nominated	
2014	Villain of the Year	Dominic Power	Nominated	
2014	Villain of the Year	Emma Atkins	Longlisted	
2014	Villain of the Year	Michael Parr	Longlisted	
2014	Best Actor	Jeff Hordley	Nominated	
2014	Best Actor	Jason Merrells	Longlisted	
2014	Best Actor	Dominic Power	Longlisted	
2014	Best Actress	Charlie Hardwick	Longlisted	
2014	Best Actress	Lucy Pargeter	Longlisted	
2014	Best Actress	Charley Webb	Longlisted	
2014	Best Single Episode	The Woolpack siege	Nominated	
2014	Best Dramatic Performance	Charley Webb	Nominated	
2014	Best Comedy Performance	Laura Norton	Nominated	
2014	Best Young Performance	Joe Warren-Plant	Nominated	
2014	Spectacular Scene of the Year	The Woolpack siege and flood	Won	
2014	Best On-Screen Partnership	Charlie Hardwick and Chris Chittell	Nominated	
2014	Best Newcomer	Michael Parr	Nominated	
2014	Best Storyline	Killer Cameron	Nominated	
2015	Best British Soap	Emmerdale	Nominated	
2015	Best Actor	Michael Parr	Nominated	
2015	Best Actor	Kelvin Fletcher	Longlisted	
2015	Best Actor	Danny Miller	Longlisted	
2015	Best Actress	Natalie Anderson	Nominated	
2015	Best Actress	Charlotte Bellamy	Longlisted	
2015	Best Actress	Verity Rushworth	Longlisted	
2015	Villain of the Year	Ryan Hawley	Nominated	
2015	Best Comedy Performance	Laura Norton	Nominated	
2015	Best Newcomer	Ryan Hawley	Nominated	
2015	Best Storyline	Donna's Demise	Nominated	
2015	Best Single Episode	Andy goes to the brink	Nominated	
2015	Best Dramatic Performance	Natalie Anderson	Nominated	
2015	Best On-Screen Partnership	Verity Rushworth and Michael Parr	Nominated	
2015	Best Young Performance	Amelia Flanagan	Won	
2015	Scene of the Year	Donna's goodbye	Won	
2016	Best British Soap	Emmerdale	Won	
2016	Best Actor	Danny Miller	Won	
2016	Best Actor	Dominic Brunt	Longlisted	
2016	Best Actor	John Middleton	Longlisted	
2016	Best Actress	Lucy Pargeter	Nominated	
2016	Best Actress	Charlotte Bellamy	Longlisted	
2016	Best Actress	Zoe Henry	Longlisted	
2016	Villain of the Year	Ryan Hawley	Nominated	
2016	Best Comedy Performance	Matthew Wolfenden	Nominated	
2016	Best Newcomer	Isobel Steele	Nominated	
2016	Best Storyline	Aaron's Abuse	Nominated	
2016	Best Single Episode	Aftermath of Village Hall explosion	Nominated	
2016	Best Male Dramatic Performance	Danny Miller	Won	
2016	Best Female Dramatic Performance	Charlotte Bellamy	Nominated	
2016	Best Partnership	Danny Miller & Ryan Hawley	Nominated	
2016	Best Young Performance	Amelia Flanagan	Nominated	
2016	Scene of the Year	Val's Death	Won	
2016	Tony Warren Award	James Bain (Casting Director at Coronation Street and Emmerdale)	Won	
2017	Best British Soap	Emmerdale	Won	
2017	Best Actor	John Middleton	Won	
2017	Best Actor	Danny Miller	Nominated	
2017	Best Actor	Matthew Wolfenden	Longlisted	
2017	Best Actress	Charlotte Bellamy	Won	
2017	Best Actress	Zoe Henry	Longlisted	
2017	Best Actress	Natalie J Robb	Longlisted	
2017	Best Newcomer	Sally Dexter	Nominated	
2017	Best Comedy Performance	Dominic Brunt	Nominated	
2017	Best Onscreen Partnership	John Middleton and Charlotte Bellamy	Nominated	
2017	Best Male Dramatic Performance	John Middleton	Won	
2017	Best Female Dramatic Performance	Charlotte Bellamy	Nominated	
2017	Best Young Actor	Isobel Steele	Nominated	
2017	Villain of the Year	Gillian Kearney	Nominated	
2017	Scene of the Year	The Hotten Bypass pile-up	Nominated	
2017	Best Single Episode	Ashley's Point of View	Won	
2017	Best Storyline	Ashley's Dementia	Won	
2018	Best British Soap	Emmerdale	Nominated	
2018	Best Actor	Michael Parr	Nominated	
2018	Best Actor	Ryan Hawley	Nominated	
2018	Best Actor	Jeff Hordley	Longlisted	
2018	Best Actress	Emma Atkins	Nominated	
2018	Best Actress	Natalie J Robb	Longlisted	
2018	Best Actress	Lucy Pargeter	Longlisted	
2018	Best Newcomer	Andrew Scarborough	Nominated	
2018	Best Comedy Performance	Sally Dexter	Nominated	
2018	Best Onscreen Partnership	Ned Porteous and Andrew Scarborough	Nominated	
2018	Best Male Dramatic Performance	Jeff Hordley	Nominated	
2018	Best Female Dramatic Performance	Natalie J. Robb	Nominated	
2018	Best Young Actor	Isobel Steele	Won	
2018	Villain of the Year	Gillian Kearney	Nominated	
2018	Scene of the Year	Emma meets her fate	Nominated	
2018	Best Storyline	Who Killed Emma?	Nominated	
2018	Best Single Episode	Cain and Faith flashback	Nominated	
2018	Greatest Soap Moment	Hotten Bypass Crash (2016)	Won	
2019	Best British Soap	Emmerdale	Nominated	
2019	Best Actor	Dominic Brunt	Longlisted	
2019	Best Actor	Ryan Hawley	Longlisted	
2019	Best Actor	Jeff Hordley	Nominated	
2019	Best Actress	Zoe Henry	Longlisted	
2019	Best Actress	Emma Atkins	Longlisted	
2019	Best Actress	Lucy Pargeter	Won	
2019	Best Newcomer	James Moore	Nominated	
2019	Best Comedy Performance	Nicola Wheeler	Nominated	
2019	Best On-Screen Partnership	Dominic Brunt and Lucy Pargeter	Nominated	
2019	Best Male Dramatic Performance	Dominic Brunt	Nominated	
2019	Best Female Dramatic Performance	Lucy Pargeter	Nominated	
2019	Best Young Actor	Joe-Warren Plant	Nominated	
2019	Villain of the Year	Claire King	Nominated	
2019	Scene of the Year	Cain's confession to Debbie	Nominated	
2019	Best Storyline	Charity's abuse	Nominated	
2019	Best Single Episode	Chas and Paddy say goodbye to baby Grace	Nominated	
2019	The Tony Warren Award	Val Lawson	Won	
2022	Best British Soap	Emmerdale	Won	
2022	Best Comedy Performance	Lisa Riley	Nominated	
2022	Best Dramatic Performance	Mark Charnock	Won	
2022	Best Leading Performer	Mark Charnock	Nominated	
2022	Best Leading Performer	Paige Sandhu	Won	
2022	Best Leading Performer	Rebecca Sarker	Longlisted	
2022	Best Newcomer	Darcy Grey	Nominated	
2022	Best On-Screen Partnership	Isobel Steele and Bradley Johnson	Nominated	
2022	Best Family	The Dingles	Won	
2022	Best Single Episode	Marlon's stroke	Nominated	
2022	Best Storyline	Meena Serial Killer	Nominated	
2022	Best Young Performer	Amelia Flanagan	Nominated	
2022	Scene of the Year	Bridge collapse	Nominated	
2022	Villain of the Year	Paige Sandhu	Nominated	
2023	Best British Soap	Emmerdale	Nominated	
2023	Best Comedy Performance	Samantha Giles	Nominated	
2023	Best Dramatic Performance	Jeff Hordley	Nominated	
2023	Best Family	The Dingles	Nominated	
2023	Best Leading Performer	Dominic Brunt	Nominated	
2023	Best Leading Performer	Sally Dexter	Nominated	
2023	Best Leading Performer	Jeff Hordley	Longlisted	
2023	Best Leading Performer	Lucy Pargeter	Longlisted	
2023	Best Leading Performer	Michael Wildman	Longlisted	
2023	Best Newcomer	William Ash	Nominated	
2023	Best Onscreen Partnership	Mark Charnock and Dominic Brunt	Nominated	
2023	Best Single Episode	All Male Man Club	Nominated	
2023	Best Storyline	Paddy's Suicide Attempt	Nominated	
2023	Best Young Performer	Huey Quinn	Nominated	
2023	Scene of the Year	Paddy's Suicide Attempt	Nominated	
2023	Villain of the Year	Michael Wildman	Nominated	
2023	Outstanding Achievement	Mark Charnock	Won	
2025	Best British Soap	Emmerdale	Nominated	
2025	Best Comedy Performance	Nicola Wheeler	Nominated	
2025	Best Dramatic Performance	Eden Taylor-Draper	Nominated	
2025	Best Family	The Dingles	Nominated	
2025	Best Leading Performer	Mark Charnock	Longlisted	
2025	Best Leading Performer	Beth Cordingly	Nominated	
2025	Best Leading Performer	Danny Miller	Longlisted	
2025	Best Leading Performer	Eden Taylor-Draper	Nominated	
2025	Best Newcomer	Shebz Miah	Nominated	
2025	Best Onscreen Partnership	William Ash and Beth Cordingly	Nominated	
2025	Best Single Episode	April's life on the streets	Nominated	
2025	Best Young Performer	Amelia Flanagan	Won	
2025	Scene of the Year	Amy's deathly plunge reveals a secret	Nominated	
2025	Villain of the Year	Ned Porteous	Nominated	

== Broadcast Awards ==
The Broadcast Awards are run by Broadcast magazine. They recognise and reward excellence in and around the UK television programming industry.

Year	Category	Nominee	Result	Ref
2011	Best Soap or Continuing Drama	Emmerdale	Won	
2012	Best Soap or Continuing Drama	Emmerdale	Nominated	
2013	Best Soap or Continuing Drama	Emmerdale	Nominated	
2014	Best Soap or Continuing Drama	Emmerdale	Nominated	
2015	Best Soap or Continuing Drama	Emmerdale	Nominated	
2016	Best Soap or Continuing Drama	Emmerdale	Won	
2017	Best Soap or Continuing Drama	Emmerdale	Won	
2018	Best Soap or Continuing Drama	Emmerdale	Nominated	
2019	Best Soap or Continuing Drama	Emmerdale	Nominated	
2020	Best Soap or Continuing Drama	Emmerdale	Nominated	
2023	Best Soap/Continuing Drama	Emmerdale	Pending	

== Digital Spy Soap Awards ==
The Digital Spy Soap Awards are hosted by the entertainment website Digital Spy. The first awards were presented in 2008. In 2011, the website held the Digital Spy Readers' Awards instead.

Year	Category	Nominee	Result	Ref
2008	Best Child Actor	Isabel Hodgins	Nominated	
2008	Best Child Actor	Eden Taylor-Draper	Nominated	
2008	Best Exit	Grace Barraclough	Nominated	
2008	Best Exit	Tom King	Nominated	
2008	Best Newcomer	Richard Grieve	Nominated	
2008	Best Newcomer	Sally Oliver	Nominated	
2008	Best On-Screen Partnership	Mark Charnock and Verity Rushworth	Nominated	
2008	Best On-Screen Partnership	Deena Payne and Tony Audenshaw	Nominated	
2008	Best Pet	Tootsy the dog	Nominated	
2008	Best Single Episode	35th Anniversary: Sugdens' fire	Nominated	
2008	Best Single Episode	Pageant, Len's death, Who Killed Tom King? reveal	Nominated	
2008	Best Soap	Emmerdale	Nominated	
2008	Most Popular Actor	Mark Charnock	Nominated	
2008	Most Popular Actor	Tom Lister	Nominated	
2008	Most Popular Actress	Charlie Hardwick	Nominated	
2008	Most Popular Actress	Lucy Pargeter	Nominated	
2008	Sexiest Female	Roxanne Pallett	Nominated	
2008	Sexiest Female	Sammy Winward	Nominated	
2008	Sexiest Male	Kelvin Fletcher	Nominated	
2008	Sexiest Male	Matthew Wolfenden	Nominated	
2008	Storyline of the Year	Diane and Billy's affair and Victoria's meltdown	Nominated	
2008	Storyline of the Year	Who Killed Tom King?	Nominated	
2008	Villain of the Year	Nicola De Souza	Nominated	
2008	Villain of the Year	Eli Dingle	Nominated	
2009	Soap of the Year	Emmerdale	Nominated	
2011	Best Soap Actor	Danny Miller	Won	
2011	Best Soap Storyline	Jackson's assisted suicide	Nominated	

== Inside Soap Awards ==
The Inside Soap Awards are an annual award ceremony that have been run by Inside Soap since 1996.

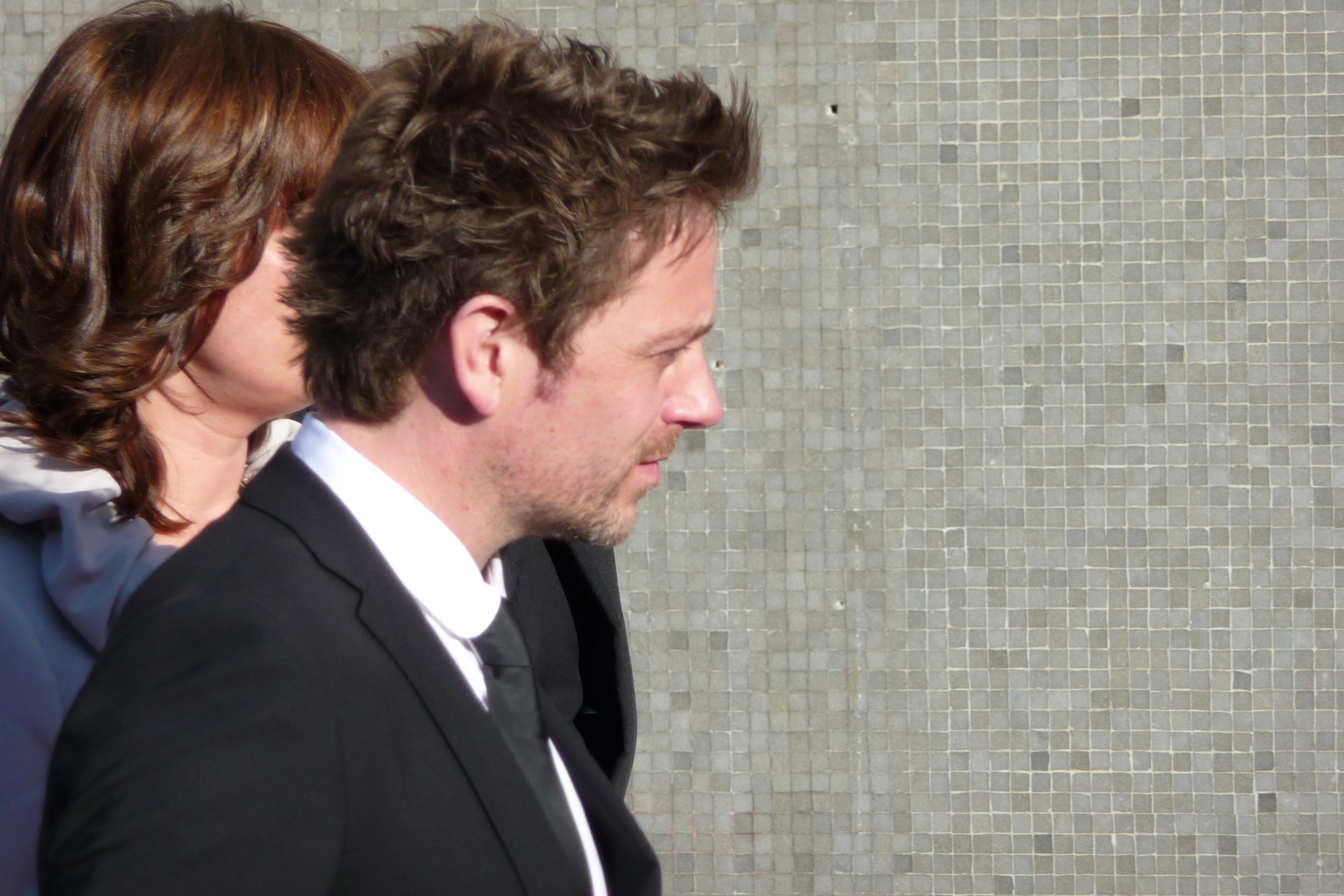
Dominic Power won Best Bad Boy at the Inside Soap Awards in 2013.

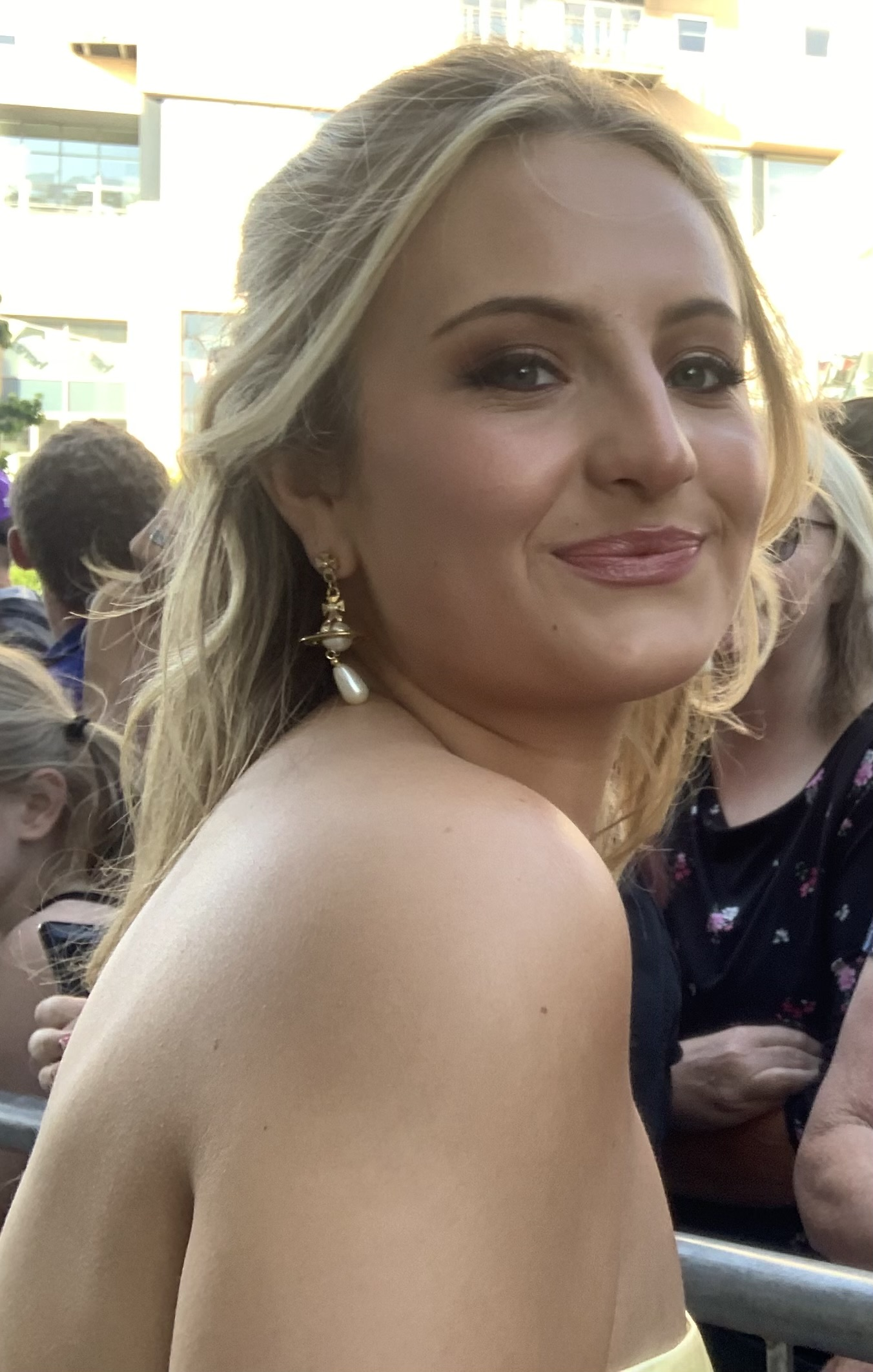
Daisy Campbell was nominated for Best Young Actor in 2018.

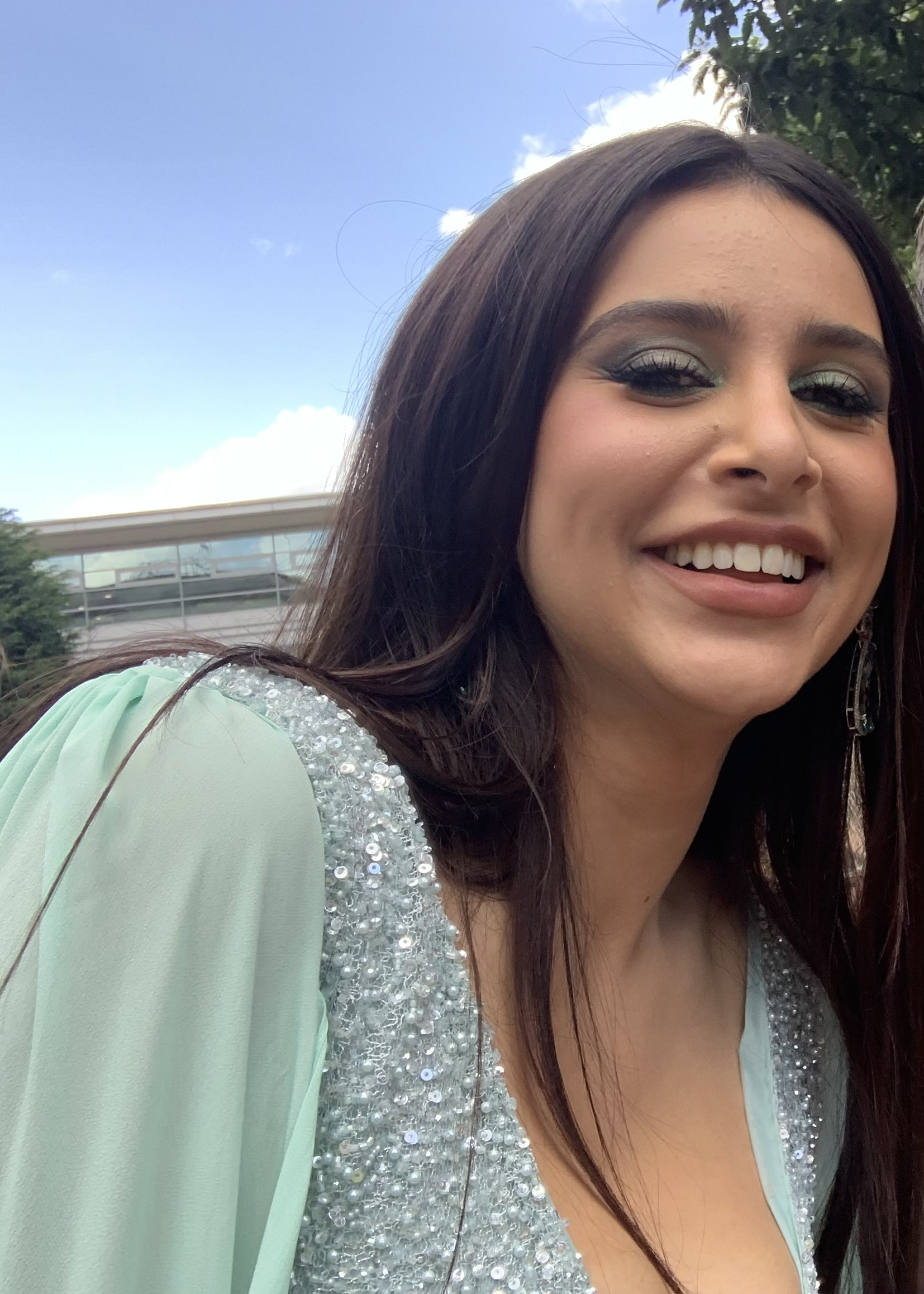
Paige Sandhu won Best Villain at the Inside Soap Awards in 2021.

Year	Category	Nominee	Result	Ref.
1996	Best Soap Plot	The Kim/Dave/Frank love triangle	Won	
1996	Biggest Bitch in Soap	Kim Tate	Won	
1996	Silliest Plot	The Dingles stealing an Elvis mannequin	Runner-up	
2001	Best Actor	Jeff Hordley (Cain Dingle)	Nominated	
2001	Best Actor	Stephen McGann (Sean Reynolds)	Nominated	
2001	Best Actress	Freya Copeland (Angie Reynolds)	Nominated	
2001	Best Actress	Samantha Giles (Bernice Thomas)	Nominated	
2001	Best Bad Boy	Jeff Hordley (Cain Dingle)	Won	
2001	Best Bitch	Emma Atkins (Charity Dingle)	Nominated	
2001	Best British Soap	Emmerdale	Nominated	
2001	Best Couple	Bernice and Ashley Thomas	Nominated	
2001	Best Couple	Viv and Bob Hope	Nominated	
2001	Best Exit	Mandy Dingle	Nominated	
2001	Best Exit	Sarah Sugden	Nominated	
2001	Best Newcomer	Tony Audenshaw (Bob Hope)	Nominated	
2001	Best Young Actor	Kelvin Fletcher (Andy Sugden)	Nominated	
2001	Funniest Character	Bob Hope	Nominated	
2001	Most Dramatic Storyline	Jack Sugden's murder trial	Nominated	
2001	Most Dramatic Storyline	Sean and Angie Reynolds' secret affairs	Nominated	
2001	Sexiest Female	Emma Atkins (Charity Dingle)	Nominated	
2001	Sexiest Female	Anna Brecon (Lady Tara Thornfield)	Nominated	
2001	Sexiest Male	Ben Freeman (Scott Windsor)	Nominated	
2001	Sexiest Male	Gary Turner (Carlos Diaz)	Nominated	
2002	Best Soap	Emmerdale	Won	
2003	Best Actress	Leah Bracknell (Zoe Tate)	Won	
2003	Best Soap	Emmerdale	Nominated	
2003	Best Young Actor	Charley Webb (Debbie Dingle)	Won	
2004	Best Bad Boy	Jeff Hordley (Cain Dingle)	Won	
2004	Best Soap	Emmerdale	Nominated	
2005	Best Actor	Jeff Hordley (Cain Dingle)	Nominated	
2005	Best Actress	Leah Bracknell (Zoe Tate)	Nominated	
2005	Best Bad Boy	Matt Healy (Matthew King)	Nominated	
2005	Best Bitch	Patsy Kensit (Sadie King)	Won	
2005	Best Couple	Elizabeth Estensen (Diane Sugden) and Clive Hornby (Jack Sugden)	Nominated	
2005	Best Couple	Verity Rushworth (Donna Windsor) and Mark Charnock (Marlon Dingle)	Nominated	
2005	Best Family	The Dingles	Won	
2005	Best Newcomer	Mathew Bose (Paul Lambert)	Nominated	
2005	Best Soap	Emmerdale	Nominated	
2005	Best Storyline	Debbie's pregnancy	Nominated	
2005	Best Young Actor	Charley Webb (Debbie Dingle)	Won	
2005	Sexiest Male	Jeff Hordley (Cain Dingle)	Nominated	
2006	Best Actor	James Hooton (Sam Dingle)	Nominated	
2006	Best Bitch	Patsy Kensit (Sadie King)	Won	
2006	Best Soap	Emmerdale	Nominated	
2006	Best Storyline	Alice Dingle's death	Won	
2006	Sexiest Female	Patsy Kensit (Sadie King)	Nominated	
2006	Sexiest Male	Tom Lister (Carl King)	Nominated	
2007	Best Soap	Emmerdale	Nominated	
2007	Best Young Actor	Eden Taylor-Draper (Belle Dingle)	Won	
2007	Funniest Character	Charlie Hardwick (Val Pollard)	Won	
2008	Best Soap	Emmerdale	Nominated	
2008	Outstanding Achievement Award	Chris Chittell (Eric Pollard)	Won	
2010	Best Actor	Dominic Brunt (Paddy Kirk)	Nominated	
2010	Best Actor	Jeff Hordley (Cain Dingle)	Nominated	
2010	Best Actor	Danny Miller (Aaron Livesy)	Won	
2010	Best Actress	Emma Atkins (Charity Dingle)	Nominated	
2010	Best Actress	Charlotte Bellamy (Laurel Thomas)	Nominated	
2010	Best Actress	Amanda Donohoe (Natasha Wylde)	Nominated	
2010	Best Dramatic Performance	Danny Miller (Aaron Livesy)	Won	
2010	Best Dramatic Performance	Amanda Donohoe (Natasha Wylde)	Nominated	
2010	Best Exit	Maxwell Caulfield (Mark Wylde)	Nominated	
2010	Best Exit	Sian Reeves (Sally Spode)	Nominated	
2010	Best Newcomer	Natalie J. Robb (Moira Barton)	Nominated	
2010	Best Newcomer	Marc Silcock (Jackson Walsh)	Nominated	
2010	Best Soap	Emmerdale	Nominated	
2010	Best Stunt	The church fire	Nominated	
2010	Best Stunt	The Home Farm Shop crash	Nominated	
2010	Best Wedding	Jimmy King (Nick Miles) and Nicola De Souza (Nicola Wheeler)	Nominated	
2010	Best Wedding	Charity Tate (Emma Atkins) and Michael Conway (Jamie Belman)	Nominated	
2010	Best Young Actor	Oscar Lloyd (Will Wylde)	Nominated	
2010	Best Young Actor	Eden Taylor-Draper (Belle Dingle)	Nominated	
2010	Funniest Performance	Dominic Brunt (Paddy Kirk)	Nominated	
2010	Funniest Performance	Mark Charnock (Marlon Dingle)	Nominated	
2010	Sexiest Male	Rik Makarem (Nikhil Sharma)	Nominated	
2010	Sexiest Male	Danny Miller (Aaron Livesy)	Nominated	
2010	Sexiest Female	Alice Coulthard (Maisie Wylde)	Nominated	
2010	Sexiest Female	Suzanne Shaw (Eve Jenson)	Nominated	
2011	Best Actor	Danny Miller	Won	
2011	Best Actress	Pauline Quirke	Nominated	
2011	Best Dramatic Performance	Danny Miller	Won	
2011	Best Exit	Marc Silcock	Nominated	
2011	Best Newcomer	Pauline Quirke	Nominated	
2011	Best Soap	Emmerdale	Nominated	
2011	Best Wedding	Chas Dingle and Carl King	Nominated	
2011	Best Young Actor	Joe-Warren Plant	Nominated	
2011	Sexiest Female	Sammy Winward	Nominated	
2011	Sexiest Male	Danny Miller	Nominated	
2013	Best Actor	Jeff Hordley	Nominated	
2013	Best Actress	Lesley Dunlop	Nominated	
2013	Best Bad Boy	Dominic Power	Won	
2013	Best Newcomer	Laura Norton	Nominated	
2013	Best Soap	Emmerdale	Won	
2013	Best Storyline	Cameron's killer cover-up	Won	
2013	Best Young Actor	Eden Taylor-Draper	Nominated	
2013	Funniest Female	Laura Norton	Nominated	
2013	Outstanding Achievement	40th anniversary live episode	Won	
2013	Sexiest Female	Natalie Anderson	Nominated	
2013	Sexiest Male	Matthew Wolfenden	Nominated	
2014	Best Actor	Jeff Hordley	Nominated	
2014	Best Actress	Verity Rushworth	Nominated	
2014	Best Bad Boy	Michael Parr	Nominated	
2014	Best Bitch	Emma Atkins	Nominated	
2014	Funniest Female	Laura Norton	Won	
2014	Best Newcomer	Michael Parr	Won	
2014	Best Young Actor	Amelia Flanagan	Won	
2014	Sexiest Male	Michael Parr	Nominated	
2014	Sexiest Female	Natalie Anderson	Nominated	
2014	Best Family	The Dingles	Nominated	
2014	Best Storyline	The Woolpack siege	Nominated	
2014	Best Soap	Emmerdale	Nominated	
2015	Best Actor	Michael Parr	Won	
2015	Best Actress	Charley Webb	Nominated	
2015	Best Affair	Debbie Dingle and Ross Barton	Won	
2015	Best Affair	Robert Sugden and Aaron Livesy	Nominated	
2015	Best Bad Boy	Michael Parr	Won	
2015	Best Bad Girl	Emma Atkins	Nominated	
2015	Best Newcomer	Ryan Hawley	Won	
2015	Best Partnership	Charlie Hardwick and Chris Chittell	Won	
2015	Best Shock Twist	Robert and Aaron's relationship	Nominated	
2015	Best Show-Stopper	Donna Windsor's death	Nominated	
2015	Best Soap	Emmerdale	Won	
2015	Best Young Actor	Amelia Flanagan	Won	
2015	Funniest Female	Laura Norton	Nominated	
2015	Sexiest Female	Natalie Anderson	Nominated	
2015	Sexiest Male	Danny Miller	Nominated	
2015	Sexiest Male	Michael Parr	Won	
2016	Best Actor	Danny Miller	Nominated	
2016	Best Actress	Lucy Pargeter	Nominated	
2016	Best Young Actor	Amelia Flanagan	Won	
2016	Best Young Actor	Isobel Steele	Nominated	
2016	Best Bad Girl	Emma Atkins	Nominated	
2016	Best Bad Boy	Jeff Hordley	Nominated	
2016	Funniest Female	Laura Norton	Nominated	
2016	Funniest Male	Matthew Wolfenden	Nominated	
2016	Best Newcomer	Isobel Steele	Nominated	
2016	Sexiest Male	Michael Parr	Nominated	
2016	Sexiest Female	Gemma Atkinson	Nominated	
2016	Best Partnership	Ryan Hawley and Danny Miller	Won	
2016	Best Partnership	Nick Miles and Nicola Wheeler	Nominated	
2016	Best Show-Stopper	Wedding Day Helicopter Crash	Nominated	
2016	Best Shock Twist	Val dies in the hall of mirrors!	Won	
2016	Best Exit	Charlie Hardwick	Nominated	
2016	Best Soap	Emmerdale	Won	
2017	Best Actor	Danny Miller	Won	
2017	Best Actor	John Middleton	Nominated	
2017	Best Actress	Charlotte Bellamy	Nominated	
2017	Best Actress	Zoe Henry	Nominated	
2017	Best Young Actor	Alfie Clarke	Won	
2017	Best Young Actor	Amelia Flanagan	Nominated	
2017	Funniest Male	Dominic Brunt	Won	
2017	Funniest Male	Nick Miles	Nominated	
2017	Funniest Female	Sally Dexter	Nominated	
2017	Best Newcomer	Sally Dexter	Nominated	
2017	Best Bad Boy	Ryan Hawley	Nominated	
2017	Best Bad Girl	Emma Atkins	Nominated	
2017	Best Bad Girl	Gillian Kearney	Won	
2017	Sexiest Female	Natalie J. Robb	Won	
2017	Sexiest Male	Michael Parr	Nominated	
2017	Sexiest Male	Matthew Wolfenden	Nominated	
2017	Best Shock Twist	Holly's death	Nominated	
2017	Best Shock Twist	James is killed by Emma	Nominated	
2017	Best Exit	John Middleton	Won	
2017	Best Exit	Bill Ward	Nominated	
2017	Best Partnership	Charlotte Bellamy and John Middleton	Nominated	
2017	Best Partnership	Ryan Hawley and Danny Miller	Nominated	
2017	Best Showstopper	Motorway crash/James' death	Won	
2017	Best Soap	Emmerdale	Won	
2018	Best Actor	Ryan Hawley	Longlisted	
2018	Best Actor	Jeff Hordley	Longlisted	
2018	Best Actor	Michael Parr	Longlisted	
2018	Best Actress	Emma Atkins	Won	
2018	Best Actress	Lucy Pargeter	Longlisted	
2018	Best Actress	Natalie J. Robb	Longlisted	
2018	Best Bad Boy	Thomas Atkinson	Nominated	
2018	Best Bad Boy	Ned Porteous	Nominated	
2018	Best Bad Girl	Emma Atkins	Longlisted	
2018	Best Bad Girl	Sally Dexter	Nominated	
2018	Funniest Male	Shaun Thomas	Nominated	
2018	Funniest Male	Mark Charnock	Nominated	
2018	Funniest Female	Sally Dexter	Longlisted	
2018	Funniest Female	Samantha Giles	Longlisted	
2018	Best Newcomer	Sandra Marvin	Longlisted	
2018	Best Newcomer	Ash Palmisciano	Won	
2018	Best Young Actor	Daisy Campbell	Won	
2018	Best Young Actor	Isobel Steele	Longlisted	
2018	Best Partnership	Danny Miller and Ryan Hawley	Nominated	
2018	Best Partnership	Michelle Hardwick and Emma Atkins	Longlisted	
2018	Best Show-Stopper	Flashback to Charity's teenage heartbreak	Longlisted	
2018	Best Show-Stopper	The Whites' car crash	Longlisted	
2018	Best Shock Twist	Lachlan kills Gerry!	Nominated	
2018	Best Shock Twist	Moira gives birth!	Nominated	
2018	Best Exit	Louise Marwood and John Bowe	Longlisted	
2018	Best Exit	Shaun Thomas	Nominated	
2018	Soap Superstar (Male)	Danny Miller	Won	
2018	Best Soap	Emmerdale	Nominated	
2019	Best Actor	Mark Charnock	Longlisted	
2019	Best Actor	Jeff Hordley	Nominated	
2019	Best Actor	Matthew Wolfendon	Longlisted	
2019	Best Actress	Isabel Hodgins	Longlisted	
2019	Best Actress	Lucy Pargeter	Nominated	
2019	Best Actress	Roxy Shahidi	Longlisted	
2019	Best Bad Boy	Dean Andrews	Longlisted	
2019	Best Bad Boy	Andrew Scarborough	Longlisted	
2019	Best Bad Girl	Louisa Clein	Won	
2019	Best Bad Girl	Claire King	Nominated	
2019	Funniest Male	Dominic Brunt	Nominated	
2019	Funniest Male	Nick Miles	Longlisted	
2019	Funniest Female	Sally Dexter	Nominated	
2019	Funniest Female	Samantha Giles	Longlisted	
2019	Best Newcomer	Jurell Carter	Longlisted	
2019	Best Newcomer	Asan N'Jie	Longlisted	
2019	Best Young Actor	Amelia Flanagan	Nominated	
2019	Best Young Actor	Joe-Warren Plant	Nominated	
2019	Best Partnership	Emma Atkins and Michelle Hardwick	Nominated	
2019	Best Partnership	Lucy Pargeter and Dominic Brunt	Won	
2019	Best Show-Stopper	Tracy, Leyla and Priya kidnap Maya	Longlisted	
2019	Best Show-Stopper	Victoria's rape	Nominated	
2019	Best Shock Twist	Flashbacks to the Big Night Out!	Won	
2019	Best Shock Twist	Joe Tate 'dies'!	Longlisted	
2019	Best Exit	Jane Cox	Won	
2019	Best Exit	Ned Porteous	Longlisted	
2019	Best Soap	Emmerdale	Nominated	
2020	Best Actor	Dominic Brunt	Longlisted	
2020	Best Actor	Jeff Hordley	Nominated	
2020	Best Actor	Mark Charnock	Longlisted	
2020	Best Actress	Emma Atkins	Longlisted	
2020	Best Actress	Lisa Riley	Longlisted	
2020	Best Actress	Natalie J. Robb	Nominated	
2020	Best Newcomer	Max Parker	Nominated	
2020	Best Newcomer	Michael Wildman	Longlisted	
2020	Best Villain	Claire King	Longlisted	
2020	Best Villain	Jonathan Wrather	Longlisted	
2020	Best Villain	Mark Womack	Nominated	
2020	Funniest Performance	Dominic Brunt	Longlisted	
2020	Funniest Performance	Lisa Riley	Nominated	
2020	Best Partnership	Lisa Riley and Bradley Johnson	Longlisted	
2020	Best Partnership	Dominic Brunt and Lucy Pargeter	Nominated	
2020	Best Show-Stopper	Cain discovers Nate's secret on the lake	Nominated	
2020	Best Show-Stopper	The lockdown episodes	Longlisted	
2020	Best Family	The Dingles	Won	
2020	Best Family	The Sharmas	Longlisted	
2020	Feel-Good Moment	Chas gives birth to baby Eve	Nominated	
2020	Feel-Good Moment	Sam and Lydia's wedding	Longlisted	
2020	Best Soap	Emmerdale	Nominated	
2021	Best Actress	Lisa Riley (Mandy Dingle)	Nominated	
2021	Best Actress	Isobel Steele (Liv Flaherty)	Nominated	
2021	Best Actress	Amy Walsh (Tracy Metcalfe)	Nominated	
2021	Best Actor	Bradley Johnson (Vinny Dingle)	Nominated	
2021	Best Actor	Jonny McPherson (Liam Cavanagh)	Nominated	
2021	Best Actor	Nick Miles (Jimmy King)	Nominated	
2021	Best Family	The Dingles	Won	
2021	Best Family	The Tates	Nominated	
2021	Best Newcomer	Kevin Mathurin (Charles Anderson)	Nominated	
2021	Best Newcomer	Lawrence Robb (Mackenzie Boyd)	Nominated	
2021	Best Newcomer	Paige Sandhu (Meena Jutla)	Nominated	
2021	Best Partnership	Isobel Steele (Liv Flaherty) and Bradley Johnson (Vinny Dingle)	Nominated	
2021	Best Partnership	Nicola Wheeler (Nicola King) and Nick Miles (Jimmy King)	Nominated	
2021	Best Show-Stopper	Jimmy's barn crash/Paul dies	Nominated	
2021	Best Show-Stopper	Meena murders Leanna	Nominated	
2021	Best Soap	Emmerdale	Nominated	
2021	Best Villain	Reece Dinsdale (Paul Ashdale)	Nominated	
2021	Best Villain	Alexander Lincoln (Jamie Tate)	Nominated	
2021	Best Villain	Paige Sandhu (Meena Jutla)	Won	
2021	Funniest Performance	Samantha Giles (Bernice Blackstock)	Nominated	
2021	Funniest Performance	Lawrence Robb (Mackenzie Boyd)	Nominated	

== National Television Awards ==
The National Television Awards were launched in 1995 and they are broadcast by ITV. The awards are voted on by the general public.

Year	Category	Nominee	Result	Ref.
1995	Most Popular Newcomer	Ian Kelsey (Dave Glover)	Nominated	
1995	Most Popular Newcomer	Jacqueline Pirie (Tina Dingle)	Nominated	
1995	Most Popular Serial Drama	Emmerdale	Nominated	
1996	Most Popular Newcomer	Lisa Riley (Mandy Dingle)	Won	
1997	Most Popular Serial Drama	Emmerdale	Nominated	
1998	Most Popular Newcomer	Anna Brecon (Tara Thornfield)	Won	
1998	Most Popular Serial Drama	Emmerdale	Nominated	
1999	Most Popular Actress	Lisa Riley (Mandy Dingle)	Nominated	
1999	Most Popular Newcomer	Samantha Giles (Bernice Blackstock)	Nominated	
1999	Most Popular Serial Drama	Emmerdale	Nominated	
2000	Most Popular Actress	Samantha Giles (Bernice Blackstock)	Nominated	
2000	Most Popular Newcomer	Kate McGregor	Nominated	
2000	Most Popular Serial Drama	Emmerdale	Nominated	
2001	Most Popular Newcomer	Tony Audenshaw (Bob Hope)	Nominated	
2001	Most Popular Serial Drama	Emmerdale	Nominated	
2002	Most Popular Actress	Leah Bracknell (Zoe Tate)	Nominated	
2002	Most Popular Newcomer	Emily Symons (Louise Appleton)	Nominated	
2002	Most Popular Newcomer	Sammy Winward (Katie Sugden)	Nominated	
2002	Most Popular Serial Drama	Emmerdale	Nominated	
2003	Most Popular Newcomer	Charley Webb (Debbie Dingle)	Nominated	
2003	Most Popular Serial Drama	Emmerdale	Nominated	
2004	Most Popular Newcomer	Patsy Kensit (Sadie King)	Nominated	
2004	Most Popular Serial Drama	Emmerdale	Nominated	
2005	Most Popular Serial Drama	Emmerdale	Nominated	
2006	Most Popular Actress	Ursula Holden-Gill (Alice Dingle)	Nominated	
2006	Most Popular Newcomer	Jenna Louise Coleman (Jasmine Thomas)	Nominated	
2006	Most Popular Serial Drama	Emmerdale	Nominated	
2007	Most Popular Newcomer	Joseph Gilgun (Eli Dingle)	Nominated	
2007	Most Popular Serial Drama	Emmerdale	Nominated	
2008	Most Popular Serial Drama	Emmerdale	Nominated	
2008	Outstanding Serial Drama Performance	Charlotte Bellamy (Laurel Thomas)	Nominated	
2010	Most Popular Newcomer	James Sutton (Ryan Lamb)	Nominated	
2010	Most Popular Serial Drama	Emmerdale	Nominated	
2011	Most Popular Newcomer	Marc Silcock (Jackson Walsh)	Nominated	
2011	Most Popular Serial Drama	Emmerdale	Nominated	
2011	Most Popular Serial Drama Performance	Danny Miller (Aaron Livesy)	Nominated	
2012	Most Popular Newcomer	Chelsea Halfpenny (Amy Wyatt)	Nominated	
2012	Most Popular Serial Drama	Emmerdale	Nominated	
2012	Most Popular Serial Drama Performance	Danny Miller	Nominated	
2013	Most Popular Newcomer	Liam Fox (Dan Spencer)	Nominated	
2013	Most Popular Serial Drama	Emmerdale	Nominated	
2014	Most Popular Newcomer	Michelle Hardwick (Vanessa Hardwick)	Nominated	
2014	Most Popular Serial Drama	Emmerdale	Nominated	
2015	Most Popular Newcomer	Michael Parr (Ross Barton)	Nominated	
2015	Most Popular Serial Drama	Emmerdale	Nominated	
2015	Most Popular Serial Drama Performance	Verity Rushworth (Donna Windsor)	Nominated	
2016	Serial Drama	Emmerdale	Nominated	
2017	Serial Drama	Emmerdale	Won	
2018	Newcomer	Ned Porteous (Joe Tate)	Nominated	
2018	Serial Drama	Emmerdale	Won	
2018	Serial Drama Performance	Danny Miller (Aaron Dingle)	Nominated	
2019	Newcomer	James Moore (Ryan Stocks)	Won	
2019	Serial Drama	Emmerdale	Won	
2019	Serial Drama Performance	Emma Atkins (Charity Dingle)	Nominated	
2019	Serial Drama Performance	Lucy Pargeter (Chas Dingle)	Nominated	
2020	Newcomer	Jurell Carter (Nate Robinson)	Nominated	
2020	Serial Drama	Emmerdale	Won	
2020	Serial Drama Performance	Danny Miller (Aaron Dingle)	Nominated	
2021	Newcomer	Emile John (Ethan Anderson)	Nominated	
2021	Serial Drama	Emmerdale	Nominated	
2021	Serial Drama Performance	Charlotte Bellamy (Laurel Thomas)	Longlisted	
2021	Serial Drama Performance	Chris Bisson (Jai Sharma)	Longlisted	
2021	Serial Drama Performance	Reece Dinsdale (Paul Ashdale)	Longlisted	
2021	Serial Drama Performance	Bradley Johnson (Vinny Dingle)	Longlisted	
2021	Serial Drama Performance	Lisa Riley (Mandy Dingle)	Longlisted	
2021	Serial Drama Performance	Isobel Steele (Liv Flaherty)	Longlisted	
2022	Rising Star	Martelle Edinborough (Suzy Merton)	Longlisted	
2022	Serial Drama	Emmerdale	Won	
2022	Serial Drama Performance	Mark Charnock (Marlon Dingle)	Won	
2022	Serial Drama Performance	Sally Dexter (Faith Dingle)	Longlisted	
2022	Serial Drama Performance	Jeff Hordley (Cain Dingle)	Longlisted	
2022	Serial Drama Performance	Lucy Pargeter (Chas Dingle)	Longlisted	
2022	Serial Drama Performance	Paige Sandhu (Meena Jutla)	Nominated	
2022	Serial Drama Performance	Rebecca Sarker (Manpreet Sharma)	Longlisted	

== Royal Television Society Awards ==
Year	Category	Nominee	Result	Ref.
2004	Soap and Continuing Drama	Emmerdale	Nominated	
2005	Soap and Continuing Drama	Emmerdale	Nominated	
2006	Soap and Continuing Drama	Emmerdale	Nominated	
2012	Soap and Continuing Drama	Emmerdale	Nominated	
2016	Soap and Continuing Drama	Emmerdale	Won	
2017	Soap and Continuing Drama	Emmerdale	Won	

=== RTS Yorkshire Awards ===
Year	Category	Nominee	Result	Ref.
2008	Best Single Drama, Series or Serial	Emmerdale	Nominated	
2008	Writer	Karin Young	Nominated	
2013	Drama	Emmerdale	Nominated	
2013	Team of the Year	Emmerdale	Won	
2014	Best On-Screen Performance	Charlie Hardwick	Won	
2016	Second Screen	Emmerdale Digital	Nominated	
2016	Actor	Charlotte Bellamy	Nominated	
2016	Writer	Maxine Alderton	Nominated	
2016	Production Design	Production Administration and Crew Scheduling	Nominated	
2017	Drama	Emmerdale	Nominated	
2017	Actor	John Middleton	Won	
2017	Writer	Maxine Alderton	Won	
2018	Drama	Emmerdale	Nominated	
2018	Actor	Jeff Hordley	Nominated	
2018	Director: Fiction	Tony Prescott	Nominated	
2019	Drama	Emmerdale	Nominated	
2021	Drama	Emmerdale	Nominated	
2021	Drama & Comedy Production	Digital Production Team	Nominated	
2021	Drama & Comedy Production	Episode 8800A Production Team	Nominated	
2021	Writer	Caroline Mitchell	Nominated	
2022	Drama	Emmerdale	Nominated	
2022	Drama & Comedy Production	Duncan Foster	Won	

=== RTS Craft & Design Awards ===
Year	Category	Nominee	Result	Ref.
2006	Visual Effects - Special Effects	Ian Rowley	Nominated	
2013	Multicamera Work	Camera team	Nominated	

== Television and Radio Industries Club Awards ==
Year	Category	Nominee	Result	Ref.
2007	Special Recognition Award	Emmerdale	Won	
2007	TV Soap of the Year	Emmerdale	Nominated	
2008	TV Soap of the Year	Emmerdale	Nominated	
2014	TV Soap of the Year	Emmerdale	Nominated	
2016	TV Soap of the Year	Emmerdale	Nominated	
2018	Soap Actor	Ryan Hawley (Robert Sugden)	Won	
2018	Soap of the Year	Emmerdale	Won	
2019	Soap of the Year	Emmerdale	Won	
2020	Soap of the Year	Emmerdale	Nominated	
2021	Soap Actor of the Year	Charlotte Bellamy (Laurel Thomas)	Longlisted	
2021	Soap Actor of the Year	Olivia Bromley (Dawn Taylor)	Longlisted	
2021	Soap Actor of the Year	Jeff Hordley (Cain Dingle)	Longlisted	
2021	Soap Actor of the Year	Mark Charnock (Marlon Dingle)	Longlisted	
2021	Soap of the Year	Emmerdale	Nominated	
2022	Soap Actor	Jeff Hordley (Cain Dingle)	Pending	
2022	Soap Actor	Bradley Johnson (Vinnie Dingle)	Pending	
2022	Soap Actor	Paige Sandhu (Meena Jutla)	Pending	
2022	Soap Actor	Isobel Steele (Liv Flaherty)	Pending	
2022	Soap of the Year	Emmerdale	Pending	

== TV Now Awards ==
The TV Now Awards is an annual awards ceremony, which takes place in Ireland. The awards celebrate favourite television moments from the previous year.

Year	Category	Nominee	Result	Ref
2009	Best Soap	Emmerdale	Nominated	
2010	Best Soap	Emmerdale	Nominated	
2010	Favourite Soap Family	The Dingles	Won	

== TVTimes Awards ==
The TVTimes Awards began in 1969 and are awarded by TVTimes magazine.

Year	Category	Nominee	Result	Ref
2009	Favourite Soap Star	Dominic Brunt (Paddy Kirk)	Nominated	
2009	Favourite Soap Star	Charlie Hardwick (Val Pollard)	Nominated	
2010	Favourite Newcomer	Danny Miller (Aaron Dingle)	Won	
2010	Favourite Soap Star	Dominic Brunt (Paddy Kirk)	Nominated	
2010	Favourite Soap Star	Mark Charnock (Marlon Dingle)	Nominated	
2010	Programme of the Year	Emmerdale	Won	
2011	Favourite Soap Star	Danny Miller (Aaron Livesy)	Won	
2011	Favourite Soap Star	Pauline Quirke (Hazel Rhodes)	Nominated	
2014	Favourite Soap Star	Mark Charnock (Marlon Dingle)	Nominated	
2014	Favourite Soap Star	Emma Atkins (Charity Dingle)	Nominated	
2014	Favourite Newcomer	Amelia Flanagan (April Windsor)	Nominated	
2016	Favourite Soap Star	Danny Miller (Aaron Livesy)	Won	
2016	Favourite Soap Star	Lucy Pargeter (Chas Dingle)	Nominated	
2016	Favourite Newcomer	Isobel Steele (Liv Flaherty)	Won	
2019	Favourite Soap Star	Amy Walsh (Tracy Metcalfe)	Nominated	
2020	Favourite Soap Star	Lisa Riley (Mandy Dingle)	Nominated	
2021	Favourite Soap Star	Amy Walsh (Tracy Metcalfe)	Nominated	

== TV Quick and TV Choice Awards ==
Year	Category	Nominee	Result	Ref
1998	Best Soap Newcomer	Anna Brecon (Tara Reynolds)	Won	
2000	Best Soap	Emmerdale	Nominated	
2000	Best Soap Actress	Samantha Giles (Bernice Blackstock)	Won	
2001	Best Soap	Emmerdale	Nominated	
2002	Best Soap	Emmerdale	Nominated	
2003	Best Soap	Emmerdale	Nominated	
2003	Best Soap Actress	Leah Bracknell (Zoe Tate)	Nominated	
2004	Best Soap	Emmerdale	Nominated	
2004	Best Soap Actor	Mark Charnock (Marlon Dingle)	Nominated	
2004	Best Soap Actress	Sheree Murphy (Tricia Dingle)	Nominated	
2004	Best Soap Storyline	Tricia's Death	Nominated	
2005	Best Soap	Emmerdale	Nominated	
2005	Best Soap Actor	Mark Charnock (Marlon Dingle)	Nominated	
2005	Best Soap Actor	Ken Farrington (Tom King)	Nominated	
2005	Best Soap Actor	Jeff Hordley (Cain Dingle)	Nominated	
2005	Best Soap Actress	Emma Atkins (Charity Dingle)	Won	
2005	Best Soap Actress	Elizabeth Estensen (Diane Sugden)	Nominated	
2005	Best Soap Actress	Patsy Kensit (Sadie King)	Nominated	
2005	Best Soap Newcomer	Mathew Bose (Paul Lambert)	Nominated	
2005	Best Soap Newcomer	Charlie Hardwick (Val Pollard)	Nominated	
2005	Best Soap Newcomer	Sherrie Hewson (Lesley Meredith)	Nominated	
2005	Best Soap Storyline	Charity's ruined wedding and her revenge on Sadie	Won	
2005	Best Soap Storyline	Diane's ongoing battle with colon cancer	Nominated	
2005	Best Soap Storyline	Steph's reign of terror	Nominated	
2006	Best Soap	Emmerdale	Nominated	
2006	Best Soap Actor	James Hooton (Sam Dingle)	Nominated	
2006	Best Soap Actress	Ursula Holden-Gill (Alice Dingle)	Won	
2006	Best Soap Newcomer	Jenna-Louise Coleman (Jasmine Thomas)	Nominated	
2006	Best Soap Storyline	Alice's battle with cancer	Nominated	
2007	Best Soap	Emmerdale	Nominated	
2007	Best Soap Actress	Linda Thorson (Rosemary King)	Nominated	
2007	Best Soap Newcomer	Joseph Gilgun (Eli Dingle)	Nominated	
2007	Best Soap Storyline	Who killed Tom King?	Nominated	
2008	Best Soap	Emmerdale	Nominated	
2008	Best Soap Actress	Charlotte Bellamy (Laurel Thomas)	Won	
2008	Best Soap Storyline	Laurel and Ashley's cot death heartbreak	Won	
2009	Best Soap	Emmerdale	Nominated	
2009	Best Soap Storyline	Shane's Murder	Nominated	
2010	Best Soap	Emmerdale	Nominated	
2010	Best Soap Actor	Danny Miller (Aaron Livesy)	Won	
2010	Best Soap Actress	Charlotte Bellamy (Laurel Thomas)	Nominated	
2010	Best Soap Newcomer	Adam Thomas (Adam Barton)	Won	
2010	Best Soap Storyline	Aaron's gay self-loathing	Won	
2011	Best Soap	Emmerdale	Nominated	
2011	Best Soap Actor	Danny Miller (Aaron Livesy)	Nominated	
2011	Best Soap Actress	Pauline Quirke (Hazel Rhodes)	Nominated	
2011	Best Soap Storyline	Lisa's rape	Nominated	
2012	Best Soap	Emmerdale	Nominated	
2012	Best Soap Actor	Steve Halliwell (Zak Dingle)	Nominated	
2012	Best Soap Newcomer	Gemma Oaten (Rachel Breckle)	Nominated	
2013	Best Soap	Emmerdale	Nominated	
2013	Best Soap Actor	Jeff Hordley (Cain Dingle)	Nominated	
2013	Best Soap Newcomer	Laura Norton (Kerry Wyatt)	Nominated	
2014	Best Soap	Emmerdale	Nominated	
2014	Best Soap Newcomer	Michael Parr (Ross Barton)	Nominated	
2014	Best Soap Storyline	Killer Cameron/The Woolpack Siege	Nominated	
2015	Best Soap	Emmerdale	Nominated	
2015	Best Soap Actor	Danny Miller (Aaron Livesy)	Won	
2015	Best Soap Actress	Natalie Anderson (Alicia Metcalfe)	Nominated	
2015	Best Soap Newcomer	Ryan Hawley (Robert Sugden)	Nominated	
2016	Best Soap	Emmerdale	Won	
2016	Best Soap Actor	Danny Miller (Aaron Livesy)	Won	
2017	Best Soap	Emmerdale	Won	
2017	Best Soap Actor	Ryan Hawley (Robert Sugden)	Won	
2017	Best Soap Actor	John Middleton (Ashley Thomas)	Nominated	
2017	Best Soap Actor	Danny Miller (Aaron Dingle)	Nominated	
2017	Best Soap Actress	Charlotte Bellamy (Laurel Thomas)	Won	
2017	Best Soap Newcomer	Sally Dexter (Faith Dingle)	Won	
2018	Best Soap	Emmerdale	Nominated	
2018	Best Soap Actor	Ryan Hawley	Nominated	
2018	Best Soap Actress	Emma Atkins (Charity Dingle)	Won	
2018	Best Soap Newcomer	Ned Porteous (Joe Tate)	Won	
2018	Best Soap Newcomer	Andrew Scarborough (Graham Foster)	Nominated	
2019	Best Soap	Emmerdale	Won	
2019	Best Soap Actor	Jeff Hordley (Cain Dingle)	Nominated	
2019	Best Soap Actor	Ryan Hawley (Robert Sugden)	Nominated	
2019	Best Soap Actress	Isabel Hodgins (Victoria Sugden)	Nominated	
2019	Best Soap Newcomer	Asan N'Jie (Ellis Chapman)	Nominated	
2020	Best Soap	Emmerdale	Nominated	
2020	Best Soap Actor	Jeff Hordley (Cain Dingle)	Nominated	
2021	Best Soap	Emmerdale	Nominated	
2021	Best Soap Actor	Chris Bisson (Jai Sharma)	Longlisted	
2021	Best Soap Actor	Reece Dinsdale (Paul Ashdale)	Longlisted	
2021	Best Soap Actor	Bradley Johnson (Vinny Dingle)	Nominated	
2021	Best Soap Actress	Charlotte Bellamy (Laurel Thomas)	Longlisted	
2021	Best Soap Actress	Lisa Riley (Mandy Dingle)	Longlisted	
2021	Best Soap Actress	Isobel Steele (Liv Flaherty)	Nominated	
2022	Best Soap	Emmerdale	Won	
2022	Best Soap Actor	Mark Charnock (Marlon Dingle)	Won	
2022	Best Soap Actor	Jeff Hordley (Cain Dingle)	Nominated	
2022	Best Soap Actor	Jonny McPherson (Liam Cavanagh)	Nominated	
2022	Best Soap Actress	Zoe Henry (Rhona Goskirk)	Nominated	
2022	Best Soap Actress	Paige Sandhu (Meena Jutla)	Nominated	
2022	Best Soap Actress	Rebecca Sarker (Manpreet Sharma)	Nominated	

== Other awards ==
Year	Award	Category	Nominee	Result	Ref
2008	Daily Star Soaper Star Awards	Best Family	The Dingles	Won	
2008	Daily Star Soaper Star Awards	Best Soap	Emmerdale	Nominated	
2010	Mental Health Media Awards	Soaps	Emmerdale	Nominated	
2010	Stonewall Awards	Broadcast of the Year	Emmerdale	Nominated	
2012	Virgin Media TV Awards	Best Baddy	Cain Dingle	Nominated	
2012	Virgin Media TV Awards	Best Soap	Emmerdale	Nominated	
2012	Virgin Media TV Awards	Most Explosive TV Moment of the Year	Jackson's assisted suicide	Nominated	
2012	Radio Times Creative Diversity Network Soap Award	Best Soap Storyline	Episode: 28 March 2012	Nominated	
