= 16th National Television Awards =

2011 British television award

- Date: 26 January 2011
- Location: The O2 Arena, London
- Country: United Kingdom
- Presented by: Various
- Hosted by: Dermot O'Leary
- Website: http://www.nationaltvawards.com/

Television/radio coverage
- Network: ITV (Main show); ITV2 (Awards party)

The 16th National Television Awards ceremony was held at The O2 Arena in London on 26 January 2011 and was hosted by Dermot O'Leary. The National Television Awards are voted by the public and the winners are revealed live on ITV.

Ant & Dec won the award for Most Popular Entertainment Presenter for the tenth year in a row, while Bruce Forsyth won the Special Recognition Award. Luis Urzúa, one of the miners who was saved from the 2010 Copiapó mining accident presented the award for Most Popular Drama. The award went to Waterloo Road, which meant Doctor Who failed to win the award for the first time since 2005.

== Performances ==
The 2010 X Factor winner Matt Cardle performed his number one single "When We Collide". Louie Spence of Pineapple Dance Studios performed a dance routine before presenting the award for Outstanding Serial Drama Performance.

== Opening ==
A scene specially written by Steven Moffat and featuring host Dermot O'Leary and Matt Smith as the Eleventh Doctor was shown before the title sequence. O'Leary wakes up and realises he has missed the awards show and then The Doctor appears with the TARDIS to offer help. They travel through time and space and meet various people from the TV industry including Ant and Dec and EastEnders character Dot Branning. Eventually, the Doctor claims that the next destination is "a vast and terrible arena full of insane shrieking banshees thirsting for blood and conquest" which Dermot identifies as the National Television Awards.

== Awards ==
Category Presenters	Winner	Also nominated
Outstanding Serial Drama Performance; Presented by Louie Spence	Lacey Turner (Stacey Branning, EastEnders)	Katherine Kelly (Becky McDonald, Coronation Street); Steve McFadden (Phil Mitchell, EastEnders); Danny Miller (Aaron Livesy, Emmerdale)
Outstanding Drama Performance; Presented by Jim Carter	David Jason (A Touch of Frost)	Matt Smith (Doctor Who); Philip Glenister (Ashes To Ashes); Benedict Cumberbatch (Sherlock)
Topical Magazine Programme; Presented by Alastair Cook	This Morning (ITV)	BBC Breakfast (BBC One); Loose Women (ITV)
Most Popular Drama; Presented by Luis Urzúa	Waterloo Road (BBC One)	Doctor Who (BBC One); Shameless (Channel 4); Sherlock (BBC One)
Most Popular Serial Drama; Presented by Stacey Solomon	EastEnders (BBC One)	Coronation Street (ITV); Emmerdale (ITV); Hollyoaks (Channel 4)
Most Popular Entertainment Programme; Presented by Holly Willoughby and Alesha Dixon	I'm a Celebrity...Get Me Out of Here! (ITV)	Big Brother (Channel 4); Mock the Week (BBC Two); QI (BBC One)
Digital Choice; Presented by Rufus Sewell	The Inbetweeners (E4)	Glee (E4/Fox); Peter Andre: The Next Chapter (ITV2)
Most Popular Entertainment Presenter; Presented by Jonathan Ross	Ant & Dec	Davina McCall; Dermot O'Leary; Paul O'Grady
Most Popular Talent Show; Presented by two audience members	The X Factor (ITV)	Dancing on Ice (ITV); Britain's Got Talent (ITV); Strictly Come Dancing (BBC One)
Most Popular Comedy Programme; Presented by Ruth Jones	Benidorm (ITV)	Harry Hill's TV Burp (ITV); Michael McIntyre's Comedy Roadshow (BBC One); Outnumbered (BBC One)
Most Popular Factual Programme; Presented by Ann Widdecombe	Top Gear (BBC Two)	Celebrity MasterChef (BBC One); Junior Apprentice (BBC One); Who Do You Think You Are? (BBC One)
Most Popular Newcomer; Presented by Matt Di Angelo	Ricky Norwood (Fatboy, EastEnders)	Paula Lane (Kylie Platt, Coronation Street); Marc Silcock (Jackson Walsh, Emmerdale); Olga Fedori (Frieda Petrenko, Holby City)
Special Recognition Award; Presented by Stephen Fry	Bruce Forsyth	

=== Longlist ===
This is the list of full nominees for the 2011 National Television Awards. Voting was open to the public from September 2010 until January 2011.

Category	Nominees
Best Serial Drama Performance	Bill Tarmey (Coronation Street); Simon Gregson (Coronation Street); Chris Gascoyne (Coronation Street); Katherine Kelly (Coronation Street); Jane Danson (Coronation Street); Alison King (Coronation Street); Lindsey Coulson (EastEnders); Marc Elliott (EastEnders); Don Gilet (EastEnders); Steve McFadden (EastEnders); Diane Parish (EastEnders); Lacey Turner (EastEnders); Danny Miller (Emmerdale); Dominic Brunt (Emmerdale); Jeff Hordley (Emmerdale); Amanda Donohoe (Emmerdale); Charlotte Bellamy (Emmerdale); Natalie J Robb (Emmerdale); Jorgie Porter (Hollyoaks); Claire Cooper (Hollyoaks); Bronagh Waugh (Hollyoaks); Andrew Moss (Hollyoaks); Anthony Quinlan (Hollyoaks); Kieron Richardson (Hollyoaks); Stefan Dennis (Neighbours)
Best Drama Performance	David Jason (A Touch of Frost); Kelly Reilly (Above Suspicion - The Red Dahlia); Ciarán Hinds (Above Suspicion - The Red Dahlia); Philip Glenister (Ashes To Ashes); Keeley Hawes (Ashes To Ashes); Georgia Taylor (Casualty); Michael French (Casualty); Douglas Henshall (Collision); Martin Clunes (Doc Martin); Matt Smith (Doctor Who); Karen Gillan (Doctor Who); Suranne Jones (Five Days); David Morrissey (Five Days); Michael Kitchen (Foyle's War); Joe McFadden (Heartbeat); Hayden Panettiere (Heroes); Luke Roberts (Holby City); Rosie Marcel (Holby City); Adrian Lester (Hustle); Robert Glenister (Hustle); Julia Sawalha (Lark Rise To Candleford); Bradley Walsh (Law & Order: UK); Ben Daniels (Law & Order: UK); Kevin Whately (Lewis); Laurence Fox (Lewis); Idris Elba (Luther); Shaun Dooley (Married Single Other); Colin Morgan (Merlin); Bradley James(Merlin); John Nettles (Midsomer Murders); Robbie Coltraine (Murderland); Alun Armstrong(New Tricks); James Bolam (New Tricks); Amanda Redman (New Tricks); Dennis Waterman (New Tricks); David Threlfall (Shameless); Rebecca Atkinson (Shameless); Benedict Cumberbatch Sherlock); Martin Freeman (Sherlock); Emilia Fox (Silent Witness); Richard Armitage (Spooks); Peter Firth (Spooks); Simon Baker (The Mentalist); Trevor Eve (Waking The Dead); Sue Johnston (Waking The Dead); Kenneth Branagh (Wallander); Amanda Burton (Waterloo Road); William Ash (Waterloo Road); Stephen Tompkinson (Wild At Heart); Dawn Steele (Wild At Heart)
Best Daytime and Topical Magazine Programme	BBC Breakfast (BBC One); Daybreak (ITV); GMTV (ITV); This Morning (ITV) Loose Women (ITV); The Alan Titchmarsh Show (ITV); The One Show (BBC One); The Wright Stuff (Channel 5); Let's Do Lunch with Gino and Mel (ITV)
Best Drama	A Touch of Frost (ITV) Above Suspicion - The Red Dahlia (ITV); Ashes To Ashes (BBC One); Casualty (BBC One); Collision (ITV); CSI: Crime Scene Investigation (Channel 5/CBS); Doc Martin (ITV); Doctor Who (BBC One); Five Days (BBC One/HBO); Foyle's War (ITV); Heartbeat (ITV); Heroes (BBC Two/NBC); Holby City (BBC One); Hustle (BBC One); Identity (ITV); Lark Rise to Candleford (BBC One); Law & Order: UK (ITV); Lewis (ITV); Luther (BBC One); Married Single Other (ITV); Merlin (BBC One); Midsomer Murders (ITV); Murderland (ITV); New Tricks (BBC One); Shameless (Channel 4); Sherlock (BBC One); Silent Witness (BBC One); Spooks (BBC One); The Mentalist (Channel 5/CBS); Waking The Dead (BBC One); Wallander (BBC One); Waterloo Road (BBC One); Wild At Heart (ITV)
Best Serial Drama	Coronation Street (ITV1); EastEnders (BBC One); Emmerdale (ITV1); Hollyoaks (Channel 4); Home and Away (Channel 5/Seven Network); Neighbours (Channel 5/Network Ten)
Best Entertainment Programme	101 Ways to Leave a Gameshow (BBC One); 71 Degrees North (ITV); A Question of Sport (BBC One); All Star Family Fortunes (ITV); All Star Mr And Mrs (ITV); Animals Do The Funniest Things (ITV); Ant & Dec's Push the Button (ITV); Big Brother (Channel 4); Celebrity Mastermind (BBC One); Derren Brown: The Events (Channel 4); Friday Night with Jonathan Ross (BBC One); Have I Got News for You (BBC One); Hole in the Wall (BBC One); I'm A Celebrity... Get Me Out Of Here! (ITV); James Corden's World Cup Live (ITV); Justin Lee Collins: Good Times (Channel 5); Mock the Week (BBC Two); Never Mind the Buzzcocks (BBC Two); New You've Been Framed! (ITV); Odd One In (ITV); Outtake TV (BBC One); Paul O'Grady Live (ITV); Piers Morgan's Life Stories (ITV); QI (BBC One); Take Me Out (ITV); The Big Fat Quiz of the Year (Channel 4); The Door (ITV); The National Lottery: In It to Win It (BBC One); The Whole 19 Yards (ITV); Tonight's the Night (BBC One); Total Wipeout Celebrity Special (BBC One); Who Wants to Be a Millionaire? (ITV)
Best Digital Choice	24 (Sky1/Fox); American Idol (ITV2/Fox); Being Human (BBC Three); Bones (Sky1/Fox); Britain's Got More Talent (ITV2); Chris Ryan's Strike Back (Sky1/Cinemax); Desperate Housewives (E4/ABC); Don't Tell the Bride (BBC Three); Eddie Izzard: Marathon Man (BBC Three); Family Guy (BBC Three/Fox); Glee (E4/Fox); Got To Dance (Sky1); House (Sky1/Fox); I'm a Celebrity... Get Me Out of Here! NOW! (ITV2); Lost (Sky1/ABC); Mr Bean: The Animated Series (ITV2); Peter Andre: The Next Chapter (ITV2); Russell Howard's Good News (BBC Three); Skins (E4); Stargate Universe (Sky1/Syfy); The Inbetweeners (E4); The Vampire Diaries (ITV2/The CW); The Xtra Factor (ITV2); What Katie Did Next (ITV2)
Best Entertainment Presenter	Ant and Dec; Bruce Forsyth; Caroline Flack; Cat Deeley; Chris Tarrant; Claudia Winkleman; Davina McCall; Dermot O'Leary; Fern Britton; Graham Norton; Harry Hill; Holly Willoughby; Jimmy Carr; Jonathan Ross; Justin Lee Collins; Paul O'Grady; Phillip Schofield; Piers Morgan; Stephen Mulhern; Steve Jones; Tess Daly; Vernon Kay
Best Talent Show	Britain's Got Talent (ITV); Dancing On Ice (ITV); Don't Stop Believing (Channel 5); Let's Dance For Sport Relief (BBC One); Over the Rainbow (BBC One); So You Think You Can Dance? (BBC One); Strictly Come Dancing (BBC One); The X Factor (ITV)
Best Comedy Programme	Benidorm (ITV1); Harry Hill's TV Burp (ITV1); John Bishop's Britain (BBC One); Last Of The Summer Wine (BBC One); Life Of Riley (BBC One); Live At The Apollo (BBC One); Michael McIntyre's Comedy Roadshow (BBC One); Miranda (BBC One); My Family (BBC One); Outnumbered (BBC One); Peep Show (Channel 4); Rev. (BBC Two); The Armstrong and Miller Show (BBC Two); The Impressions Show with Culshaw and Stephenson (BBC One); The IT Crowd (Channel 4)
Best Factual Programme	Antiques Roadshow (BBC One); Celebrity Masterchef (BBC One); Countryfile (BBC One); DIY SOS (BBC One); James May's Toy Stories (BBC Two); Jimmy's Food Factory (BBC Two); Joanna Lumley's Nile (ITV); Junior Apprentice (BBC One); Lion Country (ITV); Nigel Slater's Simple Suppers (BBC One); One Born Every Minute (Channel 4); Piers Morgan On Marbella (ITV); Richard Hammond's Invisible Worlds (BBC Two); Secret Britain (BBC One); Seven Ages of Britain (BBC One); The Gadget Show (Channel 5); The Lakes (ITV); Top Gear (BBC Two); Watchdog (BBC One); Who Do You Think You Are? (BBC One)
Best Newcomer	Steven Miller (Casualty); Paula Lane (Coronation Street); Ricky Norwood (EastEnders); Marc Silcock (Emmerdale); Olga Fedori (Holby City); Emmett J. Scanlan (Hollyoaks)
