= Seven Ages of Britain =

Seven Ages of Britain may refer to:

- Seven Ages of Britain (2010 TV series), a 2010 BBC series
- Seven Ages of Britain (2003 TV series), a 2003 Channel 4 series

== See also ==
- Seven ages (disambiguation)
