= Seven ages =

Seven ages or 7 Ages may refer to:

- Seven ages of man, in William Shakespeare's As You Like It
- Seven Ages, a TV Irish history documentary series
- Seven Ages of Rock, a TV music documentary series
- The Seven Ages, an orchestral suite by John Alden Carpenter
- The Seven Ages (film), a short film directed by Edwin S. Porter
- The Seven Ages of Man (painting series), a series of paintings by Robert Smirke
- 7 Ages, a board game by the Australian Design Group

== See also ==
- Seven Ages of Britain (disambiguation)
- Seven Ages of the World or Six Ages of the World, a Christian historical periodization
- Ages of Man, the stages of human existence on the Earth according to Greek mythology
