= Seven Ages of Britain (2003 TV series) =

British documentary television series

- Presented by: Bettany Hughes
- Country of origin: United Kingdom
- Original language: English
- No. of series: 1
- No. of episodes: 7

Original release
- Network: Channel 4
- Release: 15 November – 20 December 2003

Seven Ages of Britain is a 2003 British documentary television series. The seven part series was shown by Channel 4 between 15 November and 20 December 2003.

== Episodes ==
No.	Title	Original release date
1	"The First Age 6000 BC – 1000 BC"	15 November 2003
2	"The Second Age 1000 BC – 43 AD"	22 November 2003
3	"The Third Age 43 AD – 410 AD"	29 November 2003
4	"The Fourth Age 410 AD – 1066 AD"	6 December 2003
5	"The Fifth Age 1066 AD – 1350 AD"	13 December 2003
6	"The Sixth Age 1350 AD – 1530 AD"	20 December 2003
7	"The Seventh Age 1530 AD – 1700 AD"	20 December 2003

== 2010 BBC series by the same title ==
The BBC aired a later series by the same title in 2010 presented by David Dimbleby and covering a narrower time period.
