= Seven Ages of Britain (2010 TV series) =

2010 British television documentary series

- The title card of Seven Ages of Britain
- Genre: Documentary
- Written by: David Dimbleby
- Directed by: Jonty Claypole
- Presented by: David Dimbleby
- Country of origin: United Kingdom
- Original language: English
- No. of series: 1
- No. of episodes: 7

Production
- Producer: Jonty Claypole
- Running time: 60 minutes

Original release
- Network: BBC One; BBC HD
- Release: 31 January – 21 March 2010

Seven Ages of Britain is a BBC television documentary series written and presented by David Dimbleby. The seven part series was first aired on Sunday nights at 9:00pm on BBC One starting on 31 January 2010.

The series covers the history of Britain's greatest art and artefacts over the past 2000 years. Each episode covers a different period in British history. In Australia, all seven episodes aired on ABC1 each Tuesday at 8:30pm from 7 September 2010.

== Production ==
Originally the series was to air in late 2009, but was later rescheduled to early 2010. The HD edition of the show aired on BBC HD and repeats aired on BBC Two.

In Summer 2009 artist Nathaniel Mellors was commissioned by the BBC to make a short "work of modern art" to introduce the final episode of the series. The resultant work The Seven Ages of Britain Teaser features Dimbleby voicing a silicon mask cast from his own face, alongside actors Gwendoline Christie ( as 'The Operator') and Johnny Vivash (as 'Kadmus').

== Episodes ==
Episode number	Title	Period covered	Airdate	Viewers
1	"Age of Conquest"	AD 43 – 1066	31 January 2010	4.2 million (16%)
2	"Age of Worship"	1170–1400	7 February 2010	4.3 million (16%)
3	"Age of Power"	1509–1609	14 February 2010	4.5 million (17.1%)
4	"Age of Revolution"	1603–1708	28 February 2010	4.4 million (16.5%)
5	"Age of Money"	1700–1805	7 March 2010	3.82 million (14.2%)
6	"Age of Empire"	1770–1911	14 March 2010	3.72 million (14.6%)
7	"Age of Ambition"	1914 – Now	21 March 2010	3.347 million (12.6%)

== 2003 Channel 4 series by the same title ==
Channel 4 had previously aired a series by the same title but covering a broader time period in 2003, presented by Bettany Hughes. The series has since been picked up by the Discovery Channel.
