= Jackson Walsh =

Fictional character from Emmerdale

- Emmerdale character
- Portrayed by: Marc Silcock
- Duration: 2010–2011
- First appearance: 22 March 2010
- Last appearance: 26 July 2011
- Introduced by: Gavin Blyth
In-universe information
- Occupation: Builder (Until 2010)
- Father: Jerry Walsh
- Mother: Hazel Rhodes
- Stepfather: Joe Rhodes
- Stepmother: Eileen Walsh
- Half-brothers: Josh Walsh
- Aunts: Polly

Jackson Walsh is a fictional character from the British ITV soap opera Emmerdale, played by Marc Silcock. He made his first on-screen appearance on 22 March 2010. The character was introduced as a love interest for the established Aaron Livesy (Danny Miller), and Jackson became central to Aaron's coming out storyline. Jackson also began interacting with other characters and events in the village and his family were introduced. Jackson was given his own storyline in October 2010 and it saw him become a quadriplegic following a train accident. Jackson subsequently struggles with his situation and he asks Aaron and his mother, Hazel Rhodes (Pauline Quirke), to end his life.

== Casting ==
In March 2010, Digital Spy announced that former Hollyoaks actor Silcock had joined the cast of Emmerdale as Jackson Walsh, a potential love interest for Aaron Livesy (Danny Miller). Emmerdale series producer Gavin Blyth said Jackson is a "very contemporary gay character" and not a stereotype. Of his casting, Silcock said "I've always been a fan of Emmerdale, so I'm thrilled to be joining the cast. Jackson will play a big part in Aaron's journey and I'm so pleased to be involved in this story." Jackson is Silcock's second role with Emmerdale having previously appeared as Josh Hope.

Six months after joining the show, Silcock had his contract extended until early 2011. The actor revealed that he had not expected to be asked back as he thought he would just be helping out with Aaron's storyline and leaving.

== Development ==
Jackson was described as existing in his own right and not letting his sexuality define him. The serial's official website describe him as a confident gay man who dislikes unnecessary violence.

In May 2010 it was announced that established actress Pauline Quirke had been cast as Jackson's mother, Hazel Rhodes. Hazel's arrival was to coincide with a "major storyline" for Jackson. Michael J. Jackson was later cast to play his father, Jerry. Silcock said it was "a big key to understanding why Jackson is like he is." Jerry's interaction with Hazel also gave viewers an insight to Jackson's backstory. It also helped show why he was so understanding towards Aaron.

Aaron and Hazel later arrange a surprise challenge to help Jackson feel more motivated about life. When he finds out it is a skydive, Jackson decides to take part. Silcock performed the skydive for real and opted out of using a stunt double. He had previously never wanted to skydive, but wanted to stay true to his character. He knew the scenes would look more authentic and important for the storyline "to show Jackson how good life could be." The fact Jackson is tetraplegic meant there were potential logistic challenges during filming. A tetraplegic person would not be strapped into the same harness as an able-bodied person, so the team had to think of a way in to harness him to prevent body movement. Describing the scenes Silcock stated: "All the emotion you see on screen at the landing from me, Pauline Quirke and Danny Miller was genuine." This way because upon landing the aftermath scenes were shot straight away. Silcock said he found it interesting landing and immediately having to remember his lines. On-screen the event only boosts his quality of life for a short while, until he becomes depressed again.

== Storylines ==
Jackson meets Aaron in a gay bar in Hotten. After Aaron leaves, Jackson finds his mobile phone and he comes to Emmerdale to return it. He speaks to Paddy Kirk (Dominic Brunt) and gives Aaron his number. Aaron sees Jackson again and they agree to meet for a drink, but Aaron stands him up. Jackson tries to encourage Aaron to come out and they go on a date and share their first kiss. Whilst in The Woolpack, Aaron believes Jackson is going to out him and he punches him. Aaron is arrested and Jackson presses charges. Adam Barton (Adam Thomas) tells Jackson that Aaron attempted suicide and Jackson goes to his court case. Aaron then admits that he is gay. Jackson makes it clear that he is not interested in Aaron anymore and he gets a building job with Declan Macey (Jason Merrells). Jackson witnesses Aaron being threatened by Wayne Dobson (Gary Hanks) and he sticks up for Aaron. After talking things through, Aaron and Jackson begin a relationship.

Jackson's mother Hazel arrives and after she floods Jackson's flat, he is evicted. Paddy suggests that they both move in with him. Jackson decides to move in with Andy Sugden (Kelvin Fletcher) instead. After a fight, Jackson tells Aaron that he loves him. Aaron is not comfortable with this and they stop speaking to each other for a few days. Aaron decides to make it up to Jackson by arranging a night out. Paddy and Marlon Dingle (Mark Charnock) join them and Jackson and Aaron try to sort out their issues. Jackson is hurt when Aaron does not admit he loves him too and drives off. Jackson loses control of his van after trying to answer his phone and he crashes onto a railway line. A train then hits the van. Jackson is taken to hospital and placed on life support. He eventually wakes up and is told he has broken two bones in his neck, forcing him to wear a halo brace and paralysing him from the neck down. Jackson blames Aaron for the crash and they break up. Aaron and Jackson get back together and when Aaron realises he loves Jackson and is able to tell him.

Hazel hires Joe Chappell (Scott Taylor) to help care for Jackson. Jackson's father, Jerry, asks him to be godfather to his son, Josh (Benjamin Murphy), but Jackson refuses. Jackson records a video diary and reveals that he does not want to live anymore. Aaron later confesses to Jackson that he watched his diary and knows that he wants to die. Aaron tries to convince Jackson that he still has a life to live. Just as they are about to go and see a comedy gig, Jackson starts to choke and he is taken to hospital. He is told that he has a chest infection and will continue to have them, as he cannot clear his lungs. Jackson admits that he wants to die, as he cannot continue living the way he is. In an attempt to show Jackson that his life is worth living, Hazel and Aaron take him to the seaside and he goes skydiving. However, he does not change his mind and Hazel and Aaron agree to help him end his life. Jackson has a party for his friends and family in The Woolpack. The next day, Hazel brings Jackson some pills to take and Jackson tells his mother and Aaron how grateful he is for their support. Hazel cannot give Jackson the pills, even when he begs, so Aaron takes the cup and gives it to Jackson. Jackson then dies. Jackson is later seen on a videotaped message at his funeral, addressing the congregation and exonerating Hazel and Aaron of blame for his death and telling his father that he loves him. He is last seen on another video message he had recorded which is played at Aaron's trial for Jackson's murder as evidence, exonerating Aaron of blame and explaining that his death was his own choice and nobody else's.

== Reception ==
Silcock has earned various nominations for his portrayal of Jackson. In July 2010, Silcock was nominated for "Best Newcomer" at the Inside Soap Awards. The following year, he was nominated for "Most Popular Newcomer" at the National Television Awards. The crash that left Jackson paralysed received a nomination for "Spectacular Scene of the Year" at The British Soap Awards. Silcock earned a nomination for "Best Soap Actor" from the TV Choice Awards in May 2011. At the 2012 British Soap Awards, "Jackson's choice" won the accolade for "Best storyline".

Holy Soap said Jackson's most memorable moment was "The horrific car crash that left him paralysed." Kris Green writing for Digital Spy, chose Jackson and Aaron's first kiss as their picture of the day in April 2010.

Mark Perigard writing for the Boston Herald praised Silcock observing him as giving "one gripping performance after another". He also applauded the realism of Jackson being quadriplegic, stating that if it were an American soap opera he would have "fully recovered and been back to building shelves in two months".

Perigard of the Boston Herald praised Silcock for the parachute jump and called it a "great sequence." He gave credit to the actor for remaining still throughout and opined that no U.S. actor would have done the stunt for real. According to Perigard the scenes were a "welcome respite for fans" in the wake of a dramatic storyline. He also said Emmerdale were making a mistake in letting Silcock leave because he had demonstrated "once again his talent for finding the heart of every scene." What's on TV opined that "The tandem skydive initially worked wonders for the tetraplegic's attitude to life", but noted he soon slipped back into depression. Whilst Daniel Kilkelly of Digital Spy chose the scene as his "Picture of the day" and said the scenes were heartwarming to watch.

Following Jackson's death by assisted suicide, viewers had complained about the scenes being aired hours before the watershed. Media regulator Ofcom announced that it would be looking into the controversial scenes after receiving complaints overnight. Spinal injury charity, Aspire, also voiced its criticism of the scenes in a statement on their website. They revealed that when they learnt of the storyline, they voiced their concerns and asked the producers to move away from it and show Jackson's "journey back to independence in a positive light." Aspire's director of services, Alex Rankin, added, "This storyline had the potential to be ground-breaking in its approach to disability, and to challenge misguided opinions on spinal cord injury. Instead, too often, the script has opted for poor stereotypes or sensational misrepresentation. I sincerely hope that the 1,200 people who will be paralysed by spinal cord injuries this year, and their families, do not find themselves believing that Jackson's story represents their future."

Boston Herald writer Perigard praised the acting by Silcock, Miller and Quirke during the storyline. Of the scenes in which Jackson died, Perigard said "The tragedy unfolding in one home is contrasted with scenes of gentle domesticity around the village. This is drama at its most wrenching and yet so realistic it transcends the genre." Perigard called the storyline "brilliant", but was not happy that it led to Silcock's exit.
