= Marc Silcock =

British actor

- Born: Marco Silcock; 4 November 1988 (age 38); Manchester, England
- Occupation: Actor
- Years active: 2006–2017

Marco "Marc" Silcock (born 4 November 1988) is an English former actor, best known for his portrayal of Jackson Walsh in the British soap opera Emmerdale.

== Career ==
Silcock studied acting at City College Manchester and has a Diploma in Performing Arts.

Silcock joined the cast of Emmerdale as Josh Hope in 2006. He played the role of Eli in Hollyoaks from 2008 to 2009. Silcock also played Anthony Sugden in Waterloo Road, Fergal Maguire in Shameless and a hotel desk boy in The Innocence Project. He took part in the mini-series Privates as Lance Corporal Jimmy Hobbs.

In March 2010, it was announced that Silcock had rejoined the cast of Emmerdale, this time as Jackson Walsh, a potential love interest for Aaron Dingle (Danny Miller). Silcock filmed his final scenes for the show on 14 May 2011. He described his character's exit as "memorable", but refused to comment on how he would leave the soap. In 2017, Silcock retired from acting and became an estate agent with Kamani Property Group. His former co-star Adam Thomas also joined the property empire in 2018.

== Awards and nominations ==
Year	Result	Award	Category	Film or series	Character
2009	Nominated	British Soap Awards	Best On-Screen Partnership (Nico Mirallegro & Marc Silcock / Newt & Eli)	Hollyoaks	Eli
2010	Nominated	Inside Soap Awards	Best Newcomer	Emmerdale	Jackson Walsh
2011	Nominated	National Television Awards	Most Popular Newcomer	Emmerdale	Jackson Walsh
2011	Won	All About Soap Awards	Best Newcomer	Emmerdale	Jackson Walsh
2011	Nominated	Inside Soap Awards	Best Exit	Emmerdale	Jackson Walsh

Note: At the 2011 British Soap Awards, the train crash, (which involved Silcock's character) was nominated for Spectacular Scene of the Year. This nomination went to the director, Duncan Foster. At the 2012 British Soap Awards Jackson's Choice won Best Storyline, Marc Silcock accepted the award on behalf of Emmerdale, however the award is in fact credited to the Emmerdale Production Team.
